= Aurora Award for Best Novel =

Novel award

- Sponsored by: Canadian SF and Fantasy Association and SFSF Boreal Inc.
- First award: 1982

The Aurora Awards are granted annually by the Canadian SF and Fantasy Association and SFSF Boreal Inc. The Award for Best Novel was first awarded in 1982 as the Award for Best Outstanding Work, and there are two awards, one granted to an English-language work and one to a French-language work. No winner was awarded in 1983 and 1986, but shortlists were created. Until 1989, it was dedicated to any works, including non-novel-length works. It became a dedicated category in 1989 as the Award for Best Long Form (French: Meilleur Livre). It became the Award for Best Novel (Meilleur Roman) in 2011 when the Prix Aurora and Prix Boréal combined.

Robert J. Sawyer won the English-language award the most times (nine times), and Élisabeth Vonarburg has won the French-language award the most times (seven times).

== English-language Award ==
=== Winners and nominees ===
* Winners and joint winners

Year	Author(s)	Work	Publisher/Publication	Result	Ref.
1982	Phyllis Gotlieb	Judgement of Dragons	Berkley	Winner	
1982	John Robert Colombo (editor)	Friendly Aliens: Thirteen Stories of the Fantastic set in Canada	Hounslow	Finalist	
1982	Charles R. Saunders	Imaro	DAW	Finalist	
1982	Lesley Choyce & John Bell (editors)	Visions from the Edge	Pottersfield	Finalist	
1983	No winner selected				
1983	Michael G. Coney	Cat Karina	Ace	Finalist	
1983	Crawford Killian	Eyas	Bantam Spectra	Finalist	
1983	Pauline Gedge	Stargate	Macmillan	Finalist	
1983	Andrew Weiner	Station Gehanna	F&SF (Apr. 1982)	Finalist	
1983	John Robert Colombo	Wendigo: An Anthology of Fact and Fantastic Fiction	Prairie	Finalist	
1984	Not awarded; no nominees				
1985	Eileen Kernaghan	Songs from the Drowned Lands	Ace	Winner	
1985	Michael G. Coney	The Celestial Steam Locomotive	HMH	Finalist	
1985	Spider Robinson	Melancholy Elephants	Analog (Jun. 1982)	Finalist	
1985	William Gibson	Neuromancer	Ace	Finalist	
1986	No winner selected				
1986	Margaret Atwood	The Handmaid's Tale	McClelland & Stewart	Finalist	
1986	Phyllis Gotlieb	The Kingdom of the Cats	Ace	Finalist	
1986	Charles de Lint	Mulengro	Ace	Finalist	
1987	Guy Gavriel Kay	The Wandering Fire	Collins	Winner	
1987	Robert Charles Wilson	A Hidden Place	Bantam Spectra	Finalist	
1987	Crawford Killian	Lifter	Ace	Finalist	
1987	Charles de Lint	Yarrow (novel)	Ace	Finalist	
1988	Charles de Lint	Jack, the Giant Killer	Ace	Winner	
1988	Guy Gavriel Kay	The Darkest Road	Collins	Finalist	
1988	Robert Charles Wilson	Memory Wire	Bantam Spectra	Finalist	
1988	Spider Robinson	Time Pressure	HRW	Finalist	
1989	William Gibson	Mona Lisa Overdrive	Gollancz	Winner	
1989	Candas Jane Dorsey	Machine Sex and Other Stories	Porcépic	Finalist	
1989	Robert Charles Wilson	Memory Wire	Bantam Spectra	Finalist	
1989	Spider Robinson	Time Pressure	HRW	Finalist	
1989	Élisabeth Vonarburg	The Silent City	Porcépic	Finalist	
1990	Dave Duncan	West of January	Del Rey	Winner	
1990	Terence M. Green	Barking Dogs	St. Martin's	Finalist	
1990	Tanya Huff	Gate of Darkness, Circle of Light	DAW	Finalist	
1990	Robert Charles Wilson	Gypsies	Bantam	Finalist	
1990	Crawford Killian	Rogue Emperor	Del Rey	Finalist	
1990	Eileen Kernaghan	The Sarsen Witch	Ace	Finalist	
1991	Guy Gavriel Kay	Tigana	Viking	Winner	
1991	Tanya Huff	Gate of Darkness, Circle of Light	DAW	Finalist	
1991	Robert Charles Wilson	Gypsies	Bantam	Finalist	
1991	Robert J. Sawyer	Golden Fleece	Warner	Finalist	
1991	Michael G. Coney	King of the Scepter'd Isle	Dutton	Finalist	
1992	Robert J. Sawyer	Golden Fleece	Warner	Winner	
1992	Tanya Huff	Blood Price	DAW	Finalist	
1992	William Gibson & Bruce Sterling	The Difference Engine	Gollancz	Finalist	
1992	Robert Charles Wilson	The Divide	Doubleday	Finalist	
1992	Spider Robinson	Kill the Editor	Axolotl	Finalist	
1992	Charles de Lint	The Little Country	Morrow	Finalist	
1993	Sean Stewart	Passion Play	Beach Holme	Winner	
1993	Tanya Huff	Blood Trail	DAW	Finalist	
1993	Terence M. Green	Children of the Rainbow	McClelland & Stewart	Finalist	
1993	Robert J. Sawyer	Far-Seer	Ace	Finalist	
1993	Guy Gavriel Kay	A Song for Arbonne	Viking	Finalist	
1994	Sean Stewart	Nobody's Son	Macmillan	Winner	
1994	Robert J. Sawyer	Far-Seer	Ace	Finalist	
1994	Guy Gavriel Kay	A Song for Arbonne	Viking	Finalist	
1994	William Gibson	Virtual Light	Seal	Finalist	
1995	William Gibson	Virtual Light	Seal	Winner	
1995	Spider Robinson	Callahan's Touch	Ace	Finalist	
1995	Robert J. Sawyer	End of an Era	Ace	Finalist	
1995	Robert Charles Wilson	Mysterium	Bantam Spectra	Finalist	
1995	Nancy Kilpatrick	Near Death	Pocket	Finalist	
1996	Robert J. Sawyer	The Terminal Experiment	Harper Prism	Winner	
1996	Dave Duncan	The Cursed	Del Rey	Finalist	
1996	Guy Gavriel Kay	The Lions of Al-Rassan	Viking	Finalist	
1996	Robert Charles Wilson	Mysterium	Bantam Spectra	Finalist	
1996	Sean Stewart	Resurrection Man	Ace	Finalist	
1996	Spider Robinson & Jeanne Robinson	Star Mind	Ace	Finalist	
1997	Robert J. Sawyer	Starplex	Ace	Winner	
1997	Nancy Kilpatrick	Child of the Night	Raven	Finalist	
1997	Tanya Huff	No Quarter	DAW	Finalist	
1997	Sean Stewart	Resurrection Man	Ace	Finalist	
1997	Terence M. Green	Shadow of Ashland	Tor	Finalist	
1998	Candas Jane Dorsey	Black Wine	Tor	Winner	
1998	Robert J. Sawyer	Frameshift	Tor	Finalist	
1998	Robert J. Sawyer	Illegal Alien	Ace	Finalist	
1998	Terence M. Green	Shadow of Ashland	Tor	Finalist	
1998	Charles de Lint	Trader	Tor	Finalist	
1999	Robert Charles Wilson	Darwinia	Tor	Winner	
1999	Nancy Kilpatrick	Dracul: An Eternal Love Story	Lucard	Finalist	
1999	Robert J. Sawyer	Factoring Humanity	Tor	Finalist	
1999	Phyllis Gotlieb	Flesh and Gold	Tor	Finalist	
1999	Guy Gavriel Kay	Sailing to Sarantium	Viking	Finalist	
1999	Charles De Lint	Someplace to be Flying	Tor	Finalist	
2000	Robert J. Sawyer	Flashforward	Tor	Winner	
2000	Julie E. Czerneda	Beholder's Eye	DAW	Finalist	
2000	Robert Charles Wilson	Bios	Tor	Finalist	
2000	Nalo Hopkinson	Brown Girl in the Ring	Warner Aspect	Finalist	
2000	Edo van Belkom	Death Drives a Semi	Quarry	Finalist	
2000	Peter Watts	Starfish	Tor	Finalist	
2001	Eileen Kernaghan	The Snow Queen	Thistledown	Winner	
2001	Robert J. Sawyer	Calculating God	Tor	Finalist	
2001	Julie E. Czerneda	Changing Vision	DAW	Finalist	
2001	James Alan Gardner	Hunted	Eos	Finalist	
2001	Lisa Smedman	The Playback War	Warner Aspect	Finalist	
2002	Julie E. Czerneda	In the Company of Others	DAW	Winner	
2002	James Alan Gardner	Ascending	Eos	Finalist	
2002	Robert Charles Wilson	The Chronoliths	Tor	Finalist	
2002	Peter Watts	Maelstrom	Tor	Finalist	
2002	Edo van Belkom	Teeth	Meisha Merlin	Finalist	
2003	Karl Schroeder	Permanence	Tor	Winner	
2003	Robert J. Sawyer	Hominids	Tor	Finalist	
2003	Edo van Belkom	Martyrs	DIG	Finalist	
2003	Julie E. Czerneda	To Trade the Stars	DAW	Finalist	
2003	Karin Lowachee	Warchild	DAW	Finalist	
2004	Robert Charles Wilson	Blind Lake	Tor	Winner	
2004	Karin Lowachee	Burndive	Warner Aspect	Finalist	
2004	Julie E. Czerneda	Hidden in Sight	DAW	Finalist	
2004	Robert J. Sawyer	Humans	Tor	Finalist	
2004	Edo van Belkom	Scream Queen	Pinnacle	Finalist	
2004	Caitlin Sweet	A Telling of Stars	Penguin	Finalist	
2005	Edo van Belkom	Wolf Pack	Tundra	Winner	
2005	Eileen Kernaghan	The Alchemist's Daughter	Thistledown	Finalist	
2005	Matthew Hughes	Black Brillion	Tor	Finalist	
2005	Stephanie Bedwell-Grime	Fallen Angel	Telos	Finalist	
2005	James Alan Gardner	Radiant	Eos	Finalist	
2005	Julie E. Czerneda	Survival	DAW	Finalist	
2006	Karin Lowachee	Cagebird	Warner Aspect	Winner	
2006	Edo van Belkom	Lone Wolf	Tundra	Finalist	
2006	Julie E. Czerneda	Migration	DAW	Finalist	
2006	Robert J. Sawyer	Mindscan	Tor	Finalist	
2006	Caitlin Sweet	Silences of Home	Penguin	Finalist	
2006	Robert Charles Wilson	Spin	Tor	Finalist	
2007	Dave Duncan	Children of Chaos	Tor	Winner	
2007	Peter Watts	Blindsight	Tor	Finalist	
2007	Julie E. Czerneda	Regeneration	DAW	Finalist	
2007	Lynda Williams	Righteous Anger	Edge	Finalist	
2007	Tanya Huff	Smoke and Ashes	DAW	Finalist	
2007	Karl Schroeder	Sun of Suns	Tor	Finalist	
2008	Nalo Hopkinson	The New Moon’s Arms	Warner	Winner	
2008	Denys Bridger	As Fate Decrees	Edge	Finalist	
2008	Edo van Belkom	Cry Wolf	McClelland & Stewart/Tundra	Finalist	
2008	Derwin Mak	The Moon Under Her Feet	Windstorm	Finalist	
2008	Robert J. Sawyer	Rollback	Tor	Finalist	
2009	Edward Willett	Marseguro	DAW	Winner	
2009	Ursula Pflug	After the Fires	Tightrope	Finalist	
2009	Hayden Trenholm	Defending Diana	Bundoran	Finalist	
2009	Robert J. Sawyer	Identity Theft and Other Stories	Red Deer	Finalist	
2009	Douglas Smith	Impossibilia	PS	Finalist	
2010	Robert J. Sawyer	Wake	Penguin	Winner	
2010	Leslie Carmichael	The Amulet of Amon-Ra	CBAY	Finalist	
2010	Barbara Galler-Smith & Josh Langston	Druids	Edge	Finalist	
2010	Hayden Trenholm	Steel Whispers	Bundoran	Finalist	
2010	Edward Willett	Terra Insegura	DAW	Finalist	
2011	Robert J. Sawyer	Watch	Penguin	Winner	
2011	Craig Russell	Black Bottle Man	Great Plains	Finalist	
2011	Marie Bilodeau	Destiny’s Blood	Dragon Moon	Finalist	
2011	Hayden Trenholm	Stealing Home	Bundoran	Finalist	
2011	Guy Gavriel Kay	Under Heaven	Viking	Finalist	
2012	Robert J. Sawyer	Wonder	Penguin	Winner	
2012	Michael Rowe	Enter, Night	ChiZine	Finalist	
2012	David Nickle	Eutopia: A Novel of Terrible Optimism	ChiZine	Finalist	
2012	Derryl Murphy	Napier’s Bones	ChiZine	Finalist	
2012	Caitlin Sweet	The Pattern Scars	ChiZine	Finalist	
2012	Ryan Oakley	Technicolor Ultra Mall	Edge	Finalist	
2013	Tanya Huff	The Silvered	DAW	Winner	
2013	Marie Bilodeau	Destiny’s Fall	Dragon Moon	Finalist	
2013	Karen Dudley	Food for the Gods	Ravenstone	Finalist	
2013	Lynda Williams	Healer's Sword	Edge	Finalist	
2013	Chadwick Ginther	Thunder Road	Ravenstone	Finalist	
2013	Robert J. Sawyer	Triggers	Penguin	Finalist	
2014	Julie E. Czerneda	A Turn of Light	DAW	Winner	
2014	Robert J. Sawyer	Red Planet Blues	Penguin	Finalist	
2014	Guy Gavriel Kay	River of Stars	Viking	Finalist	
2014	Susan MacGregor	The Tattooed Witch	Five Rivers	Finalist	
2014	Chadwick Ginther	Tombstone Blues	Ravenstone	Finalist	
2015	Julie E. Czerneda	A Play of Shadow	DAW	Winner	
2015	Peter Watts	Echopraxia	Tor	Finalist	
2015	Tanya Huff	The Future Falls	DAW	Finalist	
2015	Jo Walton	My Real Children	Tor	Finalist	
2015	William Gibson	The Peripheral	Penguin	Finalist	
2016	A. M. Dellamonica	A Daughter of No Nation	Tor	Winner	
2016	Ryan T. McFadden	Cursed: Black Swan	Dragon Moon	Finalist	
2016	E. C. Bell	Drowning in Amber	Tyche	Finalist	
2016	Randy McCharles	Much Ado About Macbeth	Tyche	Finalist	
2016	Silvia Moreno-Garcia	Signal to Noise	Solaris	Finalist	
2016	Chadwick Ginther	Too Far Gone	Ravenstone	Finalist	
2017	Robert J. Sawyer	Quantum Night	Penguin	Winner	
2017	Guy Gavriel Kay	Children of Earth and Sky	Viking	Finalist	
2017	Madeline Ashby	Company Town	Tor	Finalist	
2017	Gerald Brandt	The Courier	DAW	Finalist	
2017	A. M. Dellamonica	The Nature of a Pirate	Tor	Finalist	
2017	Brent Nichols	Stars Like Cold Fire	Bundoran	Finalist	
2018	Fonda Lee	Jade City	Orbit	Winner	
2018	James Alan Gardner	All Those Explosions Were Someone Else's Fault	Tor	Finalist	
2018	Brent Nichols	Light of a Distant Sun	Bundoran	Finalist	
2018	Gerald Brandt	The Rebel	DAW	Finalist	
2018	Costi Gurgu	RecipeArium	White Cat	Finalist	
2018	Julie E. Czerneda	To Guard Against the Dark	DAW	Finalist	
2019	Kate Heartfield	Armed in Her Fashion	ChiZine	Winner	
2019	Chadwick Ginther	Graveyard Mind	ChiZine	Finalist	
2019	Craig DiLouie	One of Us	Orbit	Finalist	
2019	James Alan Gardner	They Promised Me the Gun Wasn't Loaded	Tor	Finalist	
2019	Derek Künsken	The Quantum Magician	Solaris	Finalist	
2019	C. L. Polk	Witchmark	Tor	Finalist	
2020	Julie E. Czerneda	The Gossamer Mage	DAW	Winner	
2020	Guy Gavriel Kay	A Brightness Long Ago	Viking Canada	Finalist	
2020	Silvia Moreno-Garcia	Gods of Jade and Shadow	Del Rey	Finalist	
2020	E. C. Bell	Haunting the Haunted	Tyche	Finalist	
2020	Fonda Lee	Jade War	Orbit	Finalist	
2020	Derek Künsken	The Quantum Garden	Solaris	Finalist	
2021	Silvia Moreno-Garcia	Mexican Gothic	Random House	Winner	
2021	Premee Mohamed	Beneath the Rising	Solaris	Finalist	
2021	Randy McCharles	A Connecticut Gumshoe in King Arthur’s Court	Tyche	Finalist	
2021	Robert J. Sawyer	The Oppenheimer Alternative	Red Deer Press	Finalist	
2021	Kelley Armstrong	A Stitch in Time	KLA Fricke	Finalist	
2022	Fonda Lee	Jade Legacy	Orbit	Winner	
2022	Premee Mohamed	A Broken Darkness	Solaris	Finalist	
2022	Derek Künsken	The Quantum War	Solaris	Finalist	
2022	David Demchuk	RED X	Strange Light	Finalist	
2022	C. L. Polk	Soulstar	Tor	Finalist	
2023	Kate Heartfield	The Embroidered Book	HarperVoyager	Winner	
2023	Guy Gavriel Kay	All the Seas of the World	Penguin	Finalist	
2023	Silvia Moreno-Garcia	The Daughter of Doctor Moreau	Del Rey	Finalist	
2023	Emily St. John Mandel	Sea of Tranquility	HarperCollins	Finalist	
2023	Premee Mohamed	The Void Ascendant	Solaris	Finalist	
2024	Kate Heartfield	The Valkyrie	HarperVoyager	Winner	
2024	Jessica Johns	Bad Cree	HarperCollins Canada	Finalist	
2024	Silvia Moreno-Garcia	Silver Nitrate	Del Rey	Finalist	
2024	Waubgeshig Rice	Moon of the Turning Leaves	Random House Canada	Finalist	
2024	Andrew F. Sullivan	The Marigold	ECW Press	Finalist	
2025	Premee Mohamed	The Siege of Burning Grass	Solaris	Winner	
2025	Nalo Hopkinson	Blackheart Man	Saga Press	Finalist	
2025	Kate Heartfield	The Tapestry of Time	Harper Voyager	Finalist	
2025	Don Miasek	Pale Grey Dot	Ravenstone	Finalist	
2025	A.G.A. Wilmot	Withered	ECW	Finalist	
2026	Robert J. Sawyer*	The Downloaded 2: Ghosts in the Machine	Audible Originals/Shadowpaw Press	Winner	
2026	Silvia Moreno-Garcia	The Bewitching	Del Rey	Finalist	
2026	Rachel A. Rosen	Blight	The BumblePuppy Press	Finalist	
2026	Tanya Huff	Direct Descendant	DAW Books	Finalist	
2026	Heather Fawcett	Emily Wilde’s Compendium of Lost Tales	Del Rey	Finalist	
2026	Julie E. Czerneda	A Shift of Time	DAW Books	Finalist	
2026	Guy Gavriel Kay	Written on the Dark	Viking Canada	Finalist	

=== Best of the Decade ===
A special award was handed out in 2017 for the best novel or series of the 2000s. If continued, this award will be given out once every 10 years.

* Winners and joint winners

Year	Author(s)	Work	Publisher/Publication	Result	Ref.
2017	Robert J. Sawyer*	The Neanderthal Parallax	Tor	Winner	
2017	Robert Charles Wilson	Blind Lake	Tor	Finalist	
2017	William Gibson	Blue Ant	Berkley	Finalist	
2017	Steven Erikson	Malazan Book of the Fallen	Tor	Finalist	
2017	Charles de Lint	The Onion Girl	Tor	Finalist	
2017	Guy Gavriel Kay	Under Heaven	Viking	Finalist	

== French-language Award ==
=== Winners and nominees ===
* Winners and joint winners

Year	Author(s)	Work	Publisher/Publication	Ref.
1989	Charles Montpetit	Temps mort (Time Out)	Paulines	
1990	Jacques Brossard	Les Années d'apprentissage (Years of Learning)	Leméac	
1991	Élisabeth Vonarburg	Histoire de la princesse et du dragon (Story of the Princess and the Dragon)	Québec/Amérique	
1992	Élisabeth Vonarburg	Ailleurs et au Japon (Elsewhere and in Japan)	Québec/Amérique	
1993	Élisabeth Vonarburg	Chroniques du Pays des Mères (The Maerlande Chronicles)	Québec/Amérique	
1994	Daniel Sernine	Chronoreg	Québec/Amérique	
1995	Joël Champetier	La Mémoire du lac (Memory of the Lake)	Québec/Amérique	
1996	Élisabeth Vonarburg	Les Voyageurs malgré eux (Travellers, Despite Themselves)	Québec/Amérique	
1997	Yves Meynard	La rose du desert (The Desert Rose)	Unknown	
1998	Jean-Pierre Guillet	L'odyssée du Penelope (The Odyssey of the Penelope)	Éditions Héritage	
1999	Alain Bergeron	Corps-machines et rêves d'anges (Body-Machines and the Dreams of Angels)	Vent D'Ouest	
2000	Francine Pelletier	Samiva de Frée	Alire	
2001	Jean-Louis Trudel	Demain, les étoiles (Tomorrow, the Stars)	Pierre Tisseyre	
2002	Jean-Louis Trudel	Les Transfigurés du Centaure (The Transfigured Centaurs)	Médiaspaul	
2003	Jean-Louis Trudel	Le Revenant de Fomalhaut (The Return of Fomalhaut)	Médiaspaul	
2004	Alain Bergeron	Phaos	Alire	
2005	Michèle Laframboise	Les Mémoires de l'arc (Memories of the Arc)	Médiaspaul	
2006	Dominic Bellavance	Alégracia et le serpent d'argent (Alégracia and the Silver Snake)	Les Six Brumes	
2007	Élisabeth Vonarburg	La Princesse de vengeance (The Vengeance Princess)	Alire	
2008	Diane Boudreau	Cimetière du musée (Museum Cemetery)	Unknown	
2009	Michèle Laframboise	Les Vents de Tammerlan (The Winds of Tammerlan)	Médiaspaul	
2010	Laurent McAllister	Suprématie (Supremacy)	Bragelonne	
2011	Héloïse Côté	La Tueuse de dragons (The Dragon Slayer)	Alire	
2012	Éric Gauthier	Montréel	Alire	
2013	Ariane Gélinas	Transtaïga	Unknown	
2014	Sébastien Chartrand	L'Ensorceleuse de Pointe-Lévy (The Enchantress of Pointe-Lévy)	Alire	
2014	Ariane Gélinas	L'île aux naufrages (The Island of Shipwrecks)	Marchand de Feuilles	
2014	Patrick Senécal	Ce qui se passe dans la cave reste dans la cave (What Happens in the Cave Remains in the Cave)	Alire	
2015	Élisabeth Vonarburg	Hôtel Olympia (Hotel Olympia)	Alire	
2015	Marilou Addison	Anita	Mortagne	
2015	Ariane Gélinas	Escalana	Marchand de Feuilles	
2015	Frédéric Raymond	Jardin de chair (Garden of Flesh)	Les Six Brumes	
2015	Patrick Senécal	Grande liquidation (Grand Liquidation)	Alire	
2015	Daniel Sernine	Les Îles du ciel (Islands of the Sky)	Soulières	
2016	Philippe-Aubert Côté	Le Jeu du Démiurge (The Demiurge Game)	Alire	
2016	Frédérick Durand	Au rendez-vous des courtisans glacés (A Rendezvous of Icy Courtesans)	Les Six Brumes	
2016	Frédérick Durand	Quand s'éteindra la dernière chandelle (When the Last Candle is Exhausted)	Black Coat	
2016	Éric Gauthier	Le Grande mort de mononc' Morbide (The Grand Death of Mononc Morbid)	Alire	
2016	Yves Meynard	Les Marches de la lune morte (Steps on the Dead Moon)	Alire	
2017	Ariane Gélinas*	Les Cendres de Sedna (The Ashes of Cedna)	Alire	
2017	Sébastien Chartrand	Le sorcier de l’Île d’Orléans (The Sorcerer of Orléans Island)	Alire	
2017	Héloïse Côté	Les monstres intérieurs (Indoor Monsters)	Alire	
2017	Martine Desjardins	La chambre verte (Green Room)	Alto	
2017	Frédéric Raymond	L’arbre maléfique(The Evil Tree)	Éditions du Phoenix	
2018	Karoline Georges*	De synthèse (Of Synthesis)	Alto	
2018	David Calvo	Toxoplasma	La Volte	
2018	Yvan Godbout	Hansel et Gretel (Hansel and Gretel)	AdA	
2018	Michèle Laframboise	La ruche (The Hive)	Les Six Brumes	
2018	Matthieu Villeneuve	Borealium tremens	La Peuplade	
2019	Élisabeth Vonarburg*	Les Pierres et les Roses. Tome 1, 2 et 3	Alire	
2019	Yves Meynard	Chrysanthe t.1 La princess perdue	Alire	
2019	Simon Rousseau	La Reine des Neiges	ADA	
2019	Stéphanie Sylvain	Le roi des ombres	Numeriklivres	
2019	Christiane Vadnais	Faunes	ALTO	
2020	Patrick Senécal*	Ceux de là-bas	Alire	
2021	Jonathan Reynolds*	Abîmes	Alire	
2022	Bernard Gilbert*	Les Singes bariolés	Québec Amérique	
2024	Jean-Sébastien Drouin*	La Voie de l’apprenti	Nux & Nox	
2024	Jean-Pierre Gorkynian	Dissident	mémoire d’encrier	
2024	Mireille LaCombe	Inmortem	Luzerne Rousse	
2024	Jennifer Pelletier	Sombre Chaos	Édiligne	
2024	Maxim Poulin and Frédéric St-Jean	Couleur de l’obscurité	Luzerne Rousse	
2025 (Note: No winner was announced for the French-language award in 2025.)	Paule Blanchette	Magnétisme	Lux & Nox	
2025	Amélie Bougie	La perle verte	Lux & Nox	
2025	Julie Desjardins	Le fléau d’Angarie	Lux & Nox	
2025	Marie-Ève Rondeau	Ashara: La quête de la Lumière	Essor-Livres	
2025	Éric Thériault	Le centre-ville des morts	Lo-Ély	
