= CAN-CON (convention) =

Canadian science fiction and fantasy convention in Ottawa

- Status: Active
- Genre: Science fiction and Fantasy
- Venue: variable
- Locations: Ottawa, Ontario
- Country: Canada
- Inaugurated: 1992
- Website: http://www.can-con.org/

CAN-CON, stylized CAN•CON, or more completely "CAN•CON: The Conference on Canadian Content in Speculative Arts and Literature", is a periodic science fiction and fantasy convention in Ottawa put on by The Society for Canadian Content in Speculative Arts and Literature. Founded in 1991 by James Botte and Farrell McGovern in response to a perception that there were no dedicated public venues that featured primarily Canadian speculative fiction writers, editors, and artists. In addition to the focus on Canadian content, it was also an attempt to bring a focus on the book back to Ottawa science fiction and fantasy events. It ran from 1992 through 1997, and again in 2001 before taking a hiatus of several years due to the two founders moving out of Canada for employment reasons; it was then relaunched in 2010 after they had both returned to Canada.

Over the years, CAN-CON has had as guests or attendees the cream of Canadian English and French speculative fiction writers and artists (with the notable exceptions of Spider Robinson, Margaret Atwood, and William Gibson). As such, it became a meeting place for Canadian writers and artists and their fans, and provided a natural venue for the national meetings of various related Canadian organizations. This caught the notice of TOR Books' senior editor David Hartwell, who came to CAN-CON and signed deals with many Canadian science fiction and fantasy writers. Of this he said, "I did more business at CAN-CON than I did at Worldcon". This informal access to large numbers of Canadian writers enabled him to spearhead TOR's Canadian publishing initiative.

== Programming ==
CAN-CON has had some of the most diverse programming SF conventions have ever had, while retaining a focus on Canada, its writing environment, and uniqueness. It has also hosted events such as book launches, Canvention with its Prix Aurora Awards, the Boréal Congress, a private label CAN-CON Wine, Virtual Reality gaming, and Co-Hosting the launch with the National Library of Canada of their exhibition "Visions of Other Worlds", Hosting Canada Post's Canadian Superhero Stamp Series Unveiling, to name a few of the notable events. The tenth Conference, which took place on September 21–23 of 2012, focused on introducing emerging and aspiring writers and artists to agents, editors, publishers and fans. The eleventh Conference, which took place at Minto Suites Hotel on October 4–6, 2013, had the theme of "The Cutting Edge"; it also hosted Canvention and the 33rd Aurora Awards. The seventeenth and most recent Conference occurred at the Ottawa Sheraton Hotel on October 18-20, 2019.

== History ==
=== Event history ===
- 1992
  - May 22, 1992 - May 24, 1992
  - Venue: Market Square Holiday Inn
  - Location:Ottawa, Ontario, Canada
  - Guests: Writers: Guy Gavriel Kay, Donald Kingsbury; Multimedia Artist: Jeff Green; Artists: Meghan Dunn, Jan Scott; Fan: Paul Valcour. First year of convention.
- 1993
  - May 14, 1993 - May 16, 1993
  - Venue: Delta Hotel
  - Location:Ottawa, Ontario, Canada
  - Guests: Writers: Robert J. Sawyer, Karen Wehrstein, Shirley Meier; Editor: Greg Ioannou; Fan: Bink. Saw the launch of the bi-annual publication The Journal of Canadian Content in Speculative Literature by CAN-CON's organizing group The Society for Canadian Content in Speculative Arts and Literature.
- 1994
  - May 13, 1994 - May 15, 1994
  - Venue: The Talisman Hotel
  - Location:Ottawa, Ontario, Canada
  - Guests: Writers: S.M. Stirling, Donald Kingsbury, Tom Henighan, Bertrand Desbiens, Ron Holla; Editor: Cath Jackel; Fan: Paul Valcour. Included a Computer Expo that featured the just released Doom game — networked on multiple machines with VR head-tracking helmets, interactive multimedia from Jeff Green, hands-on access to the newly released Mosaic web browser, and discussions by technical experts (Paul Wilson, San Mehet) and a sociologist (Síân Reid) on how to connect to and the future of the Internet.
- 1995
  - May 12, 1995 - May 14, 1995
  - Venue: The Talisman Hotel
  - Location:Ottawa, Ontario, Canada
  - Guests: Writers: Dave Duncan, Élisabeth Vonarburg, Candas Jane Dorsey, Tanya Huff, Judith Merril, Phyllis Gotlieb, Joël Champetier, Jean-Louis Trudel, Robert J. Sawyer, Donald Kingsbury, Yves Meynard, Karen Wehrstein, Shirley Meier; Artist/Poet: Heather Spears; Artist: Jean-Pierre Normand; Editors: David G. Hartwell, Cath Jackel; Fan: Robert Runté. Hosted Canvention 15 (the Prix Aurora Awards convention), Le Congrès Boréal 12 (held as a convention for the first time in 6 years, and where the Prix Boréal were given out), the 1st Annual Academic Conference on Canadian Content in Speculative Literature (now the Academic Conference on Canadian Science Fiction and Fantasy (ACCSFF) in Toronto, Ontario, Canada), and a Computer Expo (hands-on VR, workshops, and seminars). Partnered with the National Library of Canada to launch their Out Of This World! exhibit on Canadian science fiction and fantasy with a wine and cheese gala (with a specially branded wine for the occasion), and Canada Post for the launch of their Canadian Superhero stamp series, where the design for the Fleur de Lys 45¢ stamp was unveiled with comic book artist, and creator of the Fleur de Lys character, Mark Shainblum in attendance.
- 1996
  - May 17, 1996 - May 19, 1996
  - Venue: National Museum of Science And Technology
  - Location:Ottawa, Ontario, Canada
  - Guests: Writers: Robert Charles Wilson, Charles de Lint, Robert J. Sawyer, Hal Clement, Donald Kingsbury, Elizabeth Batten-Carew, Patricia Wall, Bertrand Desbiens; Editors: David G. Hartwell, Lorne Anderson, Chris Krejlgaard; Scientist in Residence: David Stephenson; Multimedia Artist: Jeff Green. Host to the 2nd Annual Academic Conference on Canadian Content in Speculative Arts and Literature, and the annual general meeting of the Canadian Science Fiction and Fantasy Foundation. Hosted another Computer Expo, featured talks by the resident astronomer at the museum about the search for extraterrestrial life, a tour of the museums restored 15" refracting telescope, and sponsored a sleepover at the museum.
- 1997
  - May 2, 1997 - May 3, 1997
  - Venue: Chimo Hotel
  - Location:Ottawa, Ontario, Canada
  - Guests: Writers: Tanya Huff, Robert J. Sawyer, Fiona Patton, Derryl Murphy, Phyllis Gotlieb, Terence M. Green, Yves Meynard, Jean-Louis Trudel, Bertrand Desbiens, Mark Leslie, Mark Shainblum, Valerie Kirkwood, Eric Choi, Dale L. Sproule, Kathryn Cramer, John Park, Carol Weekes; Poet: Carolyn Clink;Editors: David G. Hartwell, Candas Jane Dorsey, John Dupuis, Paul Recchia, Sally McBride; Scientist in Residence: David Stephenson; Multimedia Artist: Jeff Green; Fan: Paul Valcour. Tanya Huff published "The First 300 Words of An Untitled Contemporary Fantasy", and Robert J. Sawyer published "Frameshift: The Lost Opening Chapters" in the event's programme book.
- 2001
  - August 17, 2001 - August 19, 2001
  - Venue: Chimo Hotel
  - Location:Ottawa, Ontario, Canada
  - Guests: Writers: Robert J. Sawyer, Julie E. Czerneda, Terence M. Green, Alison Sinclair, M.D. Benoit, Norma McPhee; Editor: David G. Hartwell; Poet: Carolyn Clink; Artist: Larry Stewart (aka "The Doctor"); Musician: Kurt Swinghammer. Hosted the "First Annual Action Figure Video Contest", where amateur videos were being solicited for judging. Programme book included fiction by Julie E. Czerneda entitled "'Ware the Sleeper", and an essay by Robert J. Sawyer titled "The Future Is Already Here: Is There A Place for Science Fiction in the Twenty-First Century?".
- 2010
  - August 20, 2010 - August 22, 2010
  - Venue: Travelodge Hotel Ottawa (former Talisman Hotel)
  - Location:Ottawa, Ontario, Canada
  - Guests: Writers: Marie Bilodeau, Jean-Louis Trudel, Hayden Trenholm, Matthew Johnson, Eric Choi; Special: Larry Stewart (aka "The Doctor"). Theme: Steampunk. Hosted Book Launches for Marie Bilodeau and Hayden Trenholm, along with a showing of an indie film named M-Theory produced by Lloyd Deane.
- 2011
  - September 9, 2011 - September 11, 2011
  - Venue: Travelodge Hotel Ottawa (former Talisman Hotel)
  - Location:Ottawa, Ontario, Canada
  - Guests of Honour: Writer: Julie E. Czerneda; Comics/Graphic Novel: Leonard Kirk; Media: Liana K and Ed the Sock; Special Guests: Marie Bilodeau, J.M. Frey.
- 2012
  - September 21, 2012 - September 23, 2012
  - Venue: Best Western Plus Ottawa/Kanata Hotel and Conference Centre
  - Location:Ottawa, Ontario, Canada
  - Guests of Honour: Writer: Hayden Trenholm; Artist: Tom Fowler; Media: CBC's Alan Neal; Special Guests: Marie Bilodeau, Eric Choi, Leah Bobet, Matt Moore
- 2013
  - October 4, 2013 - October 6, 2013
  - Venue: Minto Suite Hotel
  - Location:Ottawa, Ontario, Canada
  - Guests of Honor: Writer/Author: Robert J. Sawyer; Editor: Hayden Trenholm; Science: Mark Robinson; Special Guests: Brendan Myers, Peter Watson, Rick Lutes, Jeffrey Manthorpe, Marie Bilodeau
- 2014
  - October 3, 2014 - October 5, 2014
  - Venue: Ottawa Sheraton Hotel
  - Location:Ottawa, Ontario, Canada
  - Guests of Honor: Writer/Author: Jo Walton; Editor: Gabrielle Harbowy; Media: Jay Odjick; Special Guests: Marie Bilodeau, Kathryn Cramer, Julie Czerneda, Prof. Jim Davies, David Hartwell
- 2015
  - October 30, 2015 - November 1, 2015
  - Venue: Ottawa Sheraton Hotel
  - Location:Ottawa, Ontario, Canada
  - Guests of Honor: Writer/Author: Edward Willett; Editor: Trevor Quachri; Renaissance Studies: Cristina Perissinotto; Special Guests: Marie Bilodeau, Gabrielle Harbowy, Jay Odjick, Robert J. Sawyer, Hayden Trenholm, Dominic Bercier, Prof. Jim Davies, Derek Newman-Stille, Prof. Peter Watson
- 2016
  - September 9, 2016 - September 11, 2016
  - Venue: Novotel Hotel
  - Location:Ottawa, Ontario, Canada
  - Guests of Honor: Science:Eric Choi; Writer/Author:Tanya Huff; Agent: Sam Morgan; Editor: Sheila Williams
- 2017
  - October 13, 2017 - October 15, 2017
  - Venue: Ottawa Sheraton Hotel
  - Location:Ottawa, Ontario, Canada
  - Guests of Honor: Writer/Author: Steven Erikson; Editor: Sheila Gilbert; Agent: Kim-Mei Kirtland
- 2018
  - October 12, 2018 - October 14, 2018
  - Venue: Ottawa Sheraton Hotel
  - Location:Ottawa, Ontario, Canada
  - Guests of Honor: Agent: Kurestin Armada; Writer/Author: Kevin Hearne; Editor: Miriam Weinberg
- 2019
  - October 18, 2019 - October 20, 2019
  - Venue: Ottawa Sheraton Hotel
  - Location:Ottawa, Ontario, Canada
  - Guests of Honor: Agent: DongWon Song; Writer/Author: Charlie Jane Anders; Editor: Lee Harris; Canvention: Kelly Robson
- The convention was cancelled in 2020 and 2021 due to the COVID-19 pandemic, but a few minor events took place through Zoom meetings.
- 2022
  - October 14, 2022 - October 16, 2022
  - Venue: Ottawa Sheraton Hotel
  - Location:Ottawa, Ontario, Canada
  - Guests of Honor: Publisher : Nathan Caro Fréchette; Author: Suyi Davies Okungbowa; Editor: E.D.E. Bell; Virtual Author: C. L. Clark; Virtual Editor: Oghenechovwe Donald Ekpeki
- 2023
  - October 13, 2023 - October 15, 2023
  - Venue: Ottawa Sheraton Hotel
  - Location:Ottawa, Ontario, Canada
  - Guests of Honor: Author: Fonda Lee, Annalee Newitz; Editor: Nivia Evans; Agent: Sara Megibow

== See also ==
- Ottawa
- Canadian science fiction
