= SF Canada =

Canadian authors association

SF Canada is an association of speculative fiction authors in Canada.

Its stated goals are to: "foster a sense of community among Canadian writers of speculative fiction, improve communication between Canadian writers of speculative fiction through such means as the publication of a regular newsletter, foster the growth of quality writing in Canadian speculative fiction, carry out lobbying activities on behalf of Canadian writers of speculative fiction, encourage the translation of Canadian speculative fiction, and to promote positive social action."

== History ==
It was initially founded as an authors collective circa 1989 under the title Canada’s National Association of Speculative Fiction Professionals. Several Canadian science fiction authors have made public claim to be "founding members" of the organization, notably Phyllis Gotlieb, Candas Jane Dorsey, Karl Schroeder and Yves Meynard, but documentation from this early period is sparse, apart from the self-report of the participants on their official websites.

SF Canada in its present form was incorporated by letters patent from the Government of Canada on September 21, 1992 with three signatories, Candas Jane Dorsey, Michael Skeet and Diane Walton

The bylaws of the corporation are publicly available in English and French on the association's website.

Presidents of SF Canada in order of succession have been: Candas Jane Dorsey, Karl Schroeder, Jean-Louis Trudel, Hugh Spencer, Mark Shainblum, Candas Jane Dorsey, Derryl Murphy, Colleen Anderson, Edward Willett, Steve Stanton, Peter Halasz, Ann Dulhanty, Lynda Williams, Ira Nayman, Robert Dawson, Arinn Dembo, and Margaret Curelas.

During the tenure of Steve Stanton, from 2011 to 2014, SF Canada awarded cash prizes in support of the Prix Aurora Award and Aurora-Boréal Award, initially $500 increasing in 2013 to $1,000 each to the winners of the Best Novel in English and le Meilleur Roman en Français.

== SF Canada Award ==
=== Winners ===
- May 15, 2011, Montréal: Héloïse Côté for La Tueuse de dragons
- November 20, 2011, Toronto: Robert J. Sawyer
- May 6, 2012, Quebec: Éric Gauthier
- August 11, 2012, Calgary: Robert J. Sawyer
- May 5, 2013, Montréal: Ariane Gélinas
- October 6, 2013, Ottawa: Tanya Huff
- May 3, 2014, Quebec: Sébastien Chartrand and Ariane Gélinas (split Award)
- October 4, 2014, Vancouver: Julie Czerneda
