= Derek Künsken =

Canadian author (born 1971)

- Born: March 13, 1971 (age 55); Cobourg, Ontario, Canada
- Education: University of Guelph; McMaster University
- Writing career
- Notable awards: Aurora Award for Best Novelette/Novella (2023)
- Website: derekkunsken.com

Derek Stéphane Künsken (born 1971) is a Canadian author of speculative fiction.

Künsken was born in Cobourg on March 13, 1971. He attended the University of Guelph and McMaster University, earning a master's degree in molecular biology from the latter. He has held many jobs, including working with street children in Honduras and working for the Canadian Federal Public Service. As of 2019, he lived with his son in Ottawa.

== Awards and honours ==
Locus named “Schools of Clay” one of the best novelettes of 2014, The Quantum Magician one of the best first novels of 2018, The House of Styx one of the best science fiction novels of 2021, and "The Last Lunar New Year" one of the best short stories of 2025. Barnes & Noble also named The Quantum Magician one of the best alternate universe novels of 2018.

In 2019, 2020, and 2023, Künsken and Marie Bilodeau won the Aurora Award for Best Fan Related Work as co-chairs of CAN-CON.

Awards for Künsken's work
Year	Work	Award	Result	Ref.
2012	"To Live and Die in Gibbontown"	Aurora Award for Best Short Fiction	Finalist	
2013	"The Way of the Needle"	Analog AnLab Award for Best Novelette	Winner	
2018	"The Science Behind The Quantum Magician"	Analog AnLab Award for Best Fact Article	Finalist	
2019	The Quantum Magician	Locus Award for Best First Novel	Finalist	
2019	The Quantum Magician	Aurora Award for Best Novel	Finalist	
2019	The Quantum Magician	Xingyun Award for Best Translated Fiction	Finalist	
2019	The Quantum Magician	Sunburst Award for Adult Fiction	Longlist	
2020	The Quantum Garden	Aurora Award for Best Novel	Finalist	
2020	"Tool Use by the Humans of Danzhai County"	Asimov’s Readers’ Award for Best Novella	Finalist	
2021	"Flowers like Needles"	Analog AnLab Award for Best Short Story	Finalist	
2021	"Tool Use by the Humans of Danzhai County"	Aurora Award for Best Novelette/Novella	Winner	
2022	The Quantum War	Aurora Award for Best Novel	Finalist	
2024	"Six Incidents of Evolution Using Time Travel"	Analog AnLab Award for Best Short Story	Finalist	

== Publications ==
=== Quantum Universe duology ===
- The Quantum Magician. Solaris. 2018. ISBN 978-1-781-08570-7.
- The Quantum Garden. Solaris. 2019. ISBN 978-1-781-08571-4.

=== Quantum Universe: Venus Ascendent duology ===
- The House of Styx. Solaris. 2020. ISBN 978-1-781-08805-0.
- The House of Saints. Solaris. 2023.

=== Collections ===
- Flight from the Ages and Other Stories. Solaris. 2022. ISBN 978-1-786-18728-4.
