= Boréal =

Science fiction and fantasy convention

- Status: Active
- Genre: Science fiction and Fantasy
- Venue: Hotel Espresso
- Locations: Montreal, Quebec
- Country: Canada
- Inaugurated: 1979
- Website: http://www.congresboreal.ca/

Boréal (French: Congrès Boréal) is an annual French-language science fiction and fantasy convention in Canada, held in a number of different cities since its founding in 1979, though all of them, save Ottawa in 1989, were located in the province of Quebec. Major events of the convention include the panel discussions, the Guest of Honour presentations, the dealer's room, and the awards ceremony. Other events on the convention program typically include a writing contest, readings and videos, as well as book, magazine, and fanzine launches.

== Programming ==
Over the years, Boréal programming has been held either exclusively in French or with the occasional bilingual event. In recent years, however, a small programming track has been devoted to panels exclusively in English. The panels cover various topics of interest to science fiction and fantasy fans, with an emphasis on science fiction and fantasy written in French in Canada. Editors, writers, critics, and artists are often part of the attendees.

== Awards ==
Since 1980, Boréal has been the main venue for the Prix Boréal awards ceremony. The Prix Boréal are awarded in a number of categories to science fiction and fantasy authors, artists, and fans working in French in Canada. The awards have been given out every year, except in 1985. Starting in 2011, the Prix Boréal have been twinned with the Prix Aurora Awards in five categories. Boréal has also hosted on several occasions the awarding of the Grand Prix de la Science-Fiction et du Fantastique québécois, now known as the Prix Jacques-Brossard.

== History ==
Boréal first ran in 1979 and was held each following year until 1989. From 1981 onwards (with the sole exception of Boréal 11 in 1989), it has been organized by a non-profit society incorporated in the province of Quebec, SFSF Boréal Inc. In 1990, Boréal went on hiatus until 1995 when it restarted as a con hosted first by CAN-CON (convention) in Ottawa and then, from 1996 to 1999, by Con-Cept in Montreal. However, smaller events were held in the interval, in Laval in 1990 and 1991, in Rimouski in 1991, and in Montreal in 1992, 1993, and 1994 in order to announce the winners of the Prix Boréal. Starting in 2000, Boréal has once again been held annually as a standalone convention, most often in Montreal.

The convention has occasionally served as host for other conventions. Canvention 24 was held as part of Boréal 21, in 2004, and the 24th French National Convention was organized in conjunction with Boréal 24 in 2007. Boréal was also a partner of the 67th World Science Fiction Convention held in Montréal in 2009.

In previous years, guests have included prominent Canadian writers including Élisabeth Vonarburg, Nalo Hopkinson, Patrick Senécal, Geoff Ryman, Guy Gavriel Kay, Yves Meynard, William Gibson, Peter Watts, Karl Schroeder, etc., as well as internationally renowned authors including Samuel Delany, Ted Chiang, Michael Swanwick, Jean-Claude Dunyach, James Morrow, Valerio Evangelisti, Laurent Genefort, and others. Boréal is focused on literary science fiction and fantasy, but remains open to other art forms, including film, bande dessinée, and media.

== See also ==
- Quebec
- Canadian science fiction
