= Steve Stanton =

Canadian author, editor, and publisher

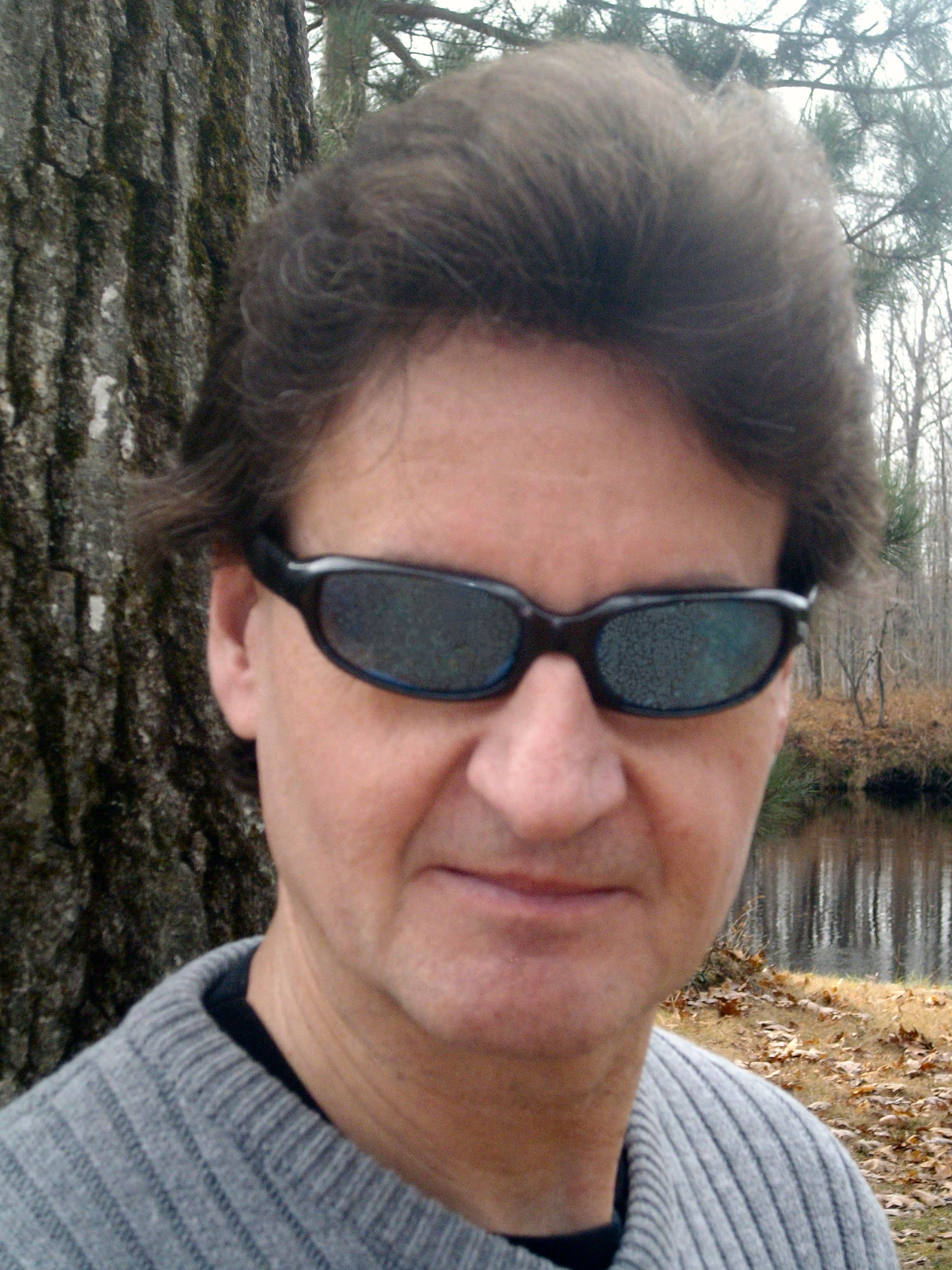
- Occupations: Author, editor, publisher
- Spouse: Wendy
- Writing career
- Period: Early 21st century
- Genres: Science fiction, fantasy
- Website: www.stevestanton.ca

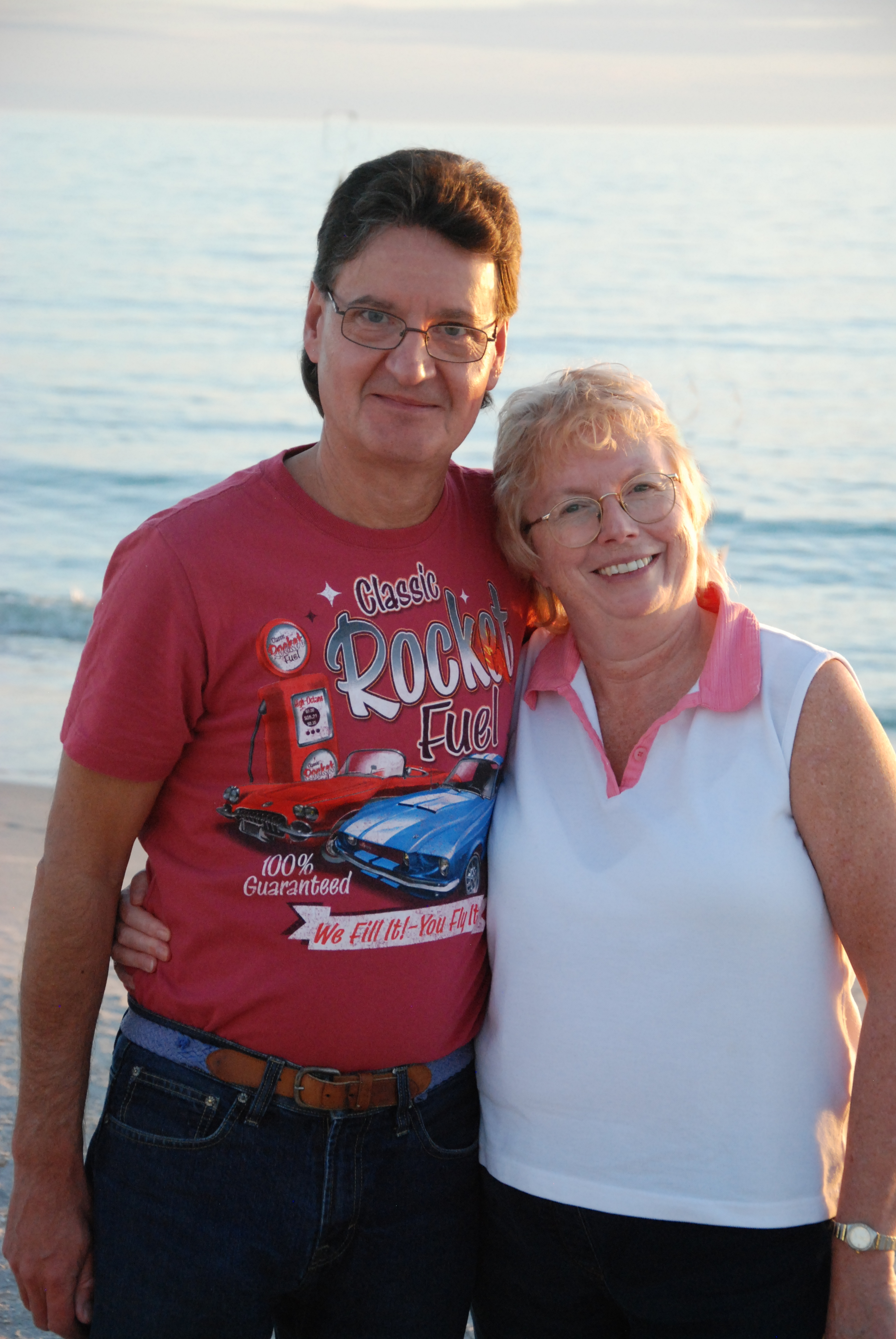
Steve Stanton with his wife Wendy at Englewood Beach, February 2015, Englewood, Florida, USA.

Steve Stanton is a Canadian author, editor, and publisher.

He founded Skysong Press in 1988 and published the literary fanzine Dreams & Visions for twenty years, as well as the Sky Songs anthology series, 2002–2005. He served on the board of directors of SF Canada for seven years from 2007 to 2014, including three years as president of the association from 2011 to 2014, when he established the bilingual SF Canada Awards.

Stanton's science fiction stories have been published in sixteen countries and a dozen languages, his cyberpunk trilogy, The Bloodlight Chronicles, was published by ECW Press in Toronto: this trilogy consists of Reconciliation (2010), Retribution (2011), and Redemption (2012). Library Journal said this "elegantly written" science fiction series "revitalizes the cyber-fiction genre with its vivid prose and believable characters." A fourth science fiction novel, Freenet, was published in 2016 by ECW Press.

== Bibliography ==
=== Novels ===
- Freenet (2016)

==== The Bloodlight Chronicles ====
- Reconciliation (2010)
- Retribution (2011)
- Redemptions (2012)

=== Anthologies ===
- Sky Songs: Stories of Spirituality and Speculative Science (2003)
- Sky Songs II: Spiritual SF (2005)
