= Calvin Gotlieb =

Canadian computer scientist (1921–2016)

- Born: Calvin Carl Gotlieb; March 27, 1921; Toronto, Ontario
- Died: October 16, 2016 (aged 95); Toronto, Ontario
- Education: University of Toronto
- Occupations: computer scientist, university professor
- Spouse: Phyllis Gotlieb (m. 1949; died 2009)
- Awards: Order of Canada

Calvin Carl "Kelly" Gotlieb, CM FRSC (March 27, 1921 – October 16, 2016) was a Canadian professor and computer scientist who has been called the "Father of Computing" in Canada. He was a Professor of Computer Science at the University of Toronto.

== Biography ==
He received a Bachelor of Science in physics in 1942, a Master of Arts in 1944 and a Ph.D. in 1947 from the University of Toronto.

In 1948, he co-founded the computation centre at the University of Toronto and was part of the first team in Canada to build computers and to provide computing services. In 1950, he created the first university course on computing in Canada and in 1951 offered the first graduate course. In 1964, he helped to found the first Canadian graduate department of computer science at the University of Toronto.

In 1958, he helped to found the Canadian Information Processing Society and was its president from 1960 to 1961.

In 1995, he was made a Member of the Order of Canada. He was a Fellow of the Royal Society of Canada and in 2006, a founding Fellow of the Canadian Information Processing Society. In 1994, he received the International Federation for Information Processing Isaac L. Auerbach Award and was inducted as a Fellow of the Association for Computing Machinery.

He was married to Phyllis Bloom, a Canadian science fiction novelist and poet, from 1949 until her death in 2009. Kelly and Phyllis Gotlieb had three children: son Leo Gotlieb; daughters Margaret Gotlieb and Jane Lipson.

Kelly Gotlieb died on October 16, 2016, in Toronto.
