= Bunch of Seven =

Group of science fiction and fantasy writers in Canada in the twentieth century

The Bunch of Seven was a group of science fiction and fantasy writers who met regularly in Toronto from March 28, 1985, until the early '90s to mutually critique manuscripts with the intention of helping each other turn professional—a goal in which several members succeeded.

The group's founders were Tanya Huff, S. M. Stirling, Karen Wehrstein, Shirley Meier, Louise Hypher, Terri Neal and Lloyd Penney. Later members included Julie Czerneda, Fiona Patton, Marian Hughes, Stephanie Rendino and others. The group became a model for other Toronto writing groups including the Cecil Street Irregulars, the Ink*Specs, and others. The name was invented by Terri Neal as a take-off on the Group of Seven, a group of well-known Canadian artists.
