= Blood Price =

1991 novel by Tanya Huff

- Author: Tanya Huff
- Language: English
- Series: Blood Books
- Genre: Fantasy Novel
- Publisher: DAW Books
- Publication date: 1991
- Followed by: Blood Trail

Blood Price is the first novel in Tanya Huff's series about private investigator 'Victoria ("Vicky/Vicki") Nelson, her new, immortal helper, bastard son of Henry VIII, Henry FitzRoy, 1st Duke of Richmond and Somerset, or simply, Henry Fitzroy, and her former lover and colleague Detective - Sergeant Mike Cellucci. It was published in 1991, and was followed by four subsequent novels: Blood Trail (1992), Blood Lines (1992), Blood Pact (1993), Blood Debt (1997), and one short stories collection - Blood Bank. Blood Price is also the title of the first two episodes of the Lifetime series, Blood Ties, which is based on Tanya Huff's books. The Vicki Nelson book series is also known as ″Blood Books″.

== Plot ==
Vicki Nelson is a former Homicide detective. When her diagnosis of Retinitis Pigmentosa (RP) ruined her night vision and forced her to leave the police force, she became a private investigator.

After becoming a witness to the brutal murder of a young man, who was drained to death, his desperate girlfriend Coreen Fennel hires her to investigate his death. Vicki tries to get some information from her former partner and competitor, Detective - Sergeant Mike Cellucci, which leads to arguments over her involvement.

Coreen informs Vicki that she thinks that the murderer is a vampire, so she begins what she calls ″hunting″, although she does not believe in the supernatural. The killer is claiming more victims, and when Vicki accidentally walks in on a crime scene, she sees the killer turning into the dark and disappearing. Because of her bad sight, she is sure that it was just an illusion, and when she turns to the body, she sees a man in black next to the body, and tries to scream, but he punches her in the head, rendering her unconscious.

When Vicki wakes up in an unknown apartment, the same man is searching her purse for some ID. She talks to him, and discovers that he is not a killer, but is also searching for him. He tells her that the killer is a demon, that she actually did see him disappear. He has an ancient book, a grimoire, that should help them. She also finds out that the stranger is Henry Fitzroy: romance writer and 450-year-old vampire. Surprisingly, she believes him. The two make a deal to catch the demon and the man who is calling it up.

Her RP makes her useless at night and Henry sleeps during the day, so they agree to share the investigation. The two uncover that the murders are ritual, that each should call one of the demon's names, and that he should give material goods to the man who is calling him, for the price of blood.

Henry tells her that he is the Duke of Richmond, the bastard son of Henry VIII, who fell in love with the vampire Christina, who turned him.

Vicki finds Henry almost dead in his apartment and the grimoire stolen and she realizes that he needs to be fed to stay alive and heal, so she allows him to drink from her wrist. This creates a bond between them.

While the investigation continues, Vicki discovers that a college student named Norman Birdwell, who is a new friend of Coreen's, summoned the demon. When Coreen finds out what Norman is doing, she takes Vicki to his residence. He kidnaps the two of them, willing to sacrifice Vicki's blood to call a new, more powerful demon, Astaroth, who wants to bring about a Hell on Earth.

Henry arrives in time to save Vicki and Coreen. Meanwhile, another demon is trying to trick the group, into procuring servants. Together, the three defeat him, and Mike Cellucci, who has been looking for Vicki, arrives in time to see Henry's vampire powers and the demon he fights with. Vicki, who almost bleeds to death, ends up in the hospital, receiving a blood transfusion. Mike comes to inform her about his police report, which leaves out the demon and Henry. Later, after dark, Henry comes to visit her, and the two agree to a date when she gets out.
