= Héloïse Côté =

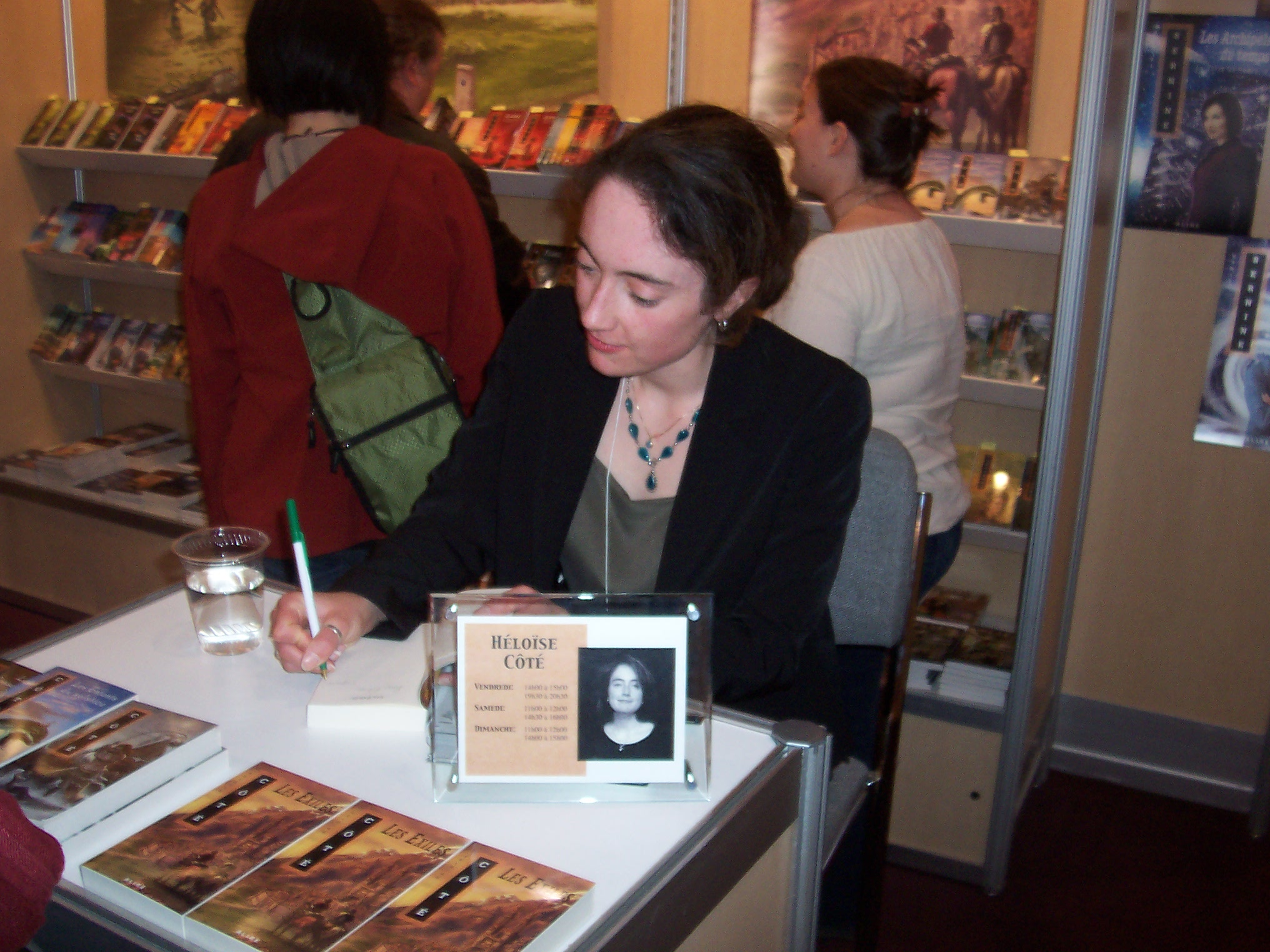
- Héloïse Côté, April 2009
- Born: 1979 (age 46–47)
- Education: B.S.Ed, M.S., Ph.D.
- Alma mater: Laval University
- Occupations: Novelist, education researcher
- Notable work: Les Chroniques de l'Hudres trilogy

Héloïse Côté (born 1979) is a Québécoise author of fantasy novels and a researcher in the sciences of education.

== Biography ==
Héloïse Côté began studying in 1998 for a Bachelor of Science in Education at Laval University in Quebec. Rather than teaching high school at the end of her undergraduate studies, as she had originally planned, she continued at Laval for her master's degree. She accumulated four annual citations on the honour roll of the Faculty of Education, and another on the honour roll of the Faculty of Graduate Studies. Côté also won the prize for the best Master's dissertation and the Raymond-Blais medal awarded by the Association of Laval University alumni to a recent graduate for the merit of her activities.

Between 2004 and 2006, Côté published the three volumes of the fantasy trilogy Les Chroniques de l'Hudres: Les Conseillers du Roi, Les Enfants du solstice and L'Ourse et le Boucher (English: The Councilors of the King, The Children of the Solstice and The Bear and the Butcher). Literary critic Laurent Laplante remarked upon the alert style and steady pace, agreeing that the writing is not dazzling but correct and a promising discipline.

Côté obtained a doctorate from Laval University in psychopedagogy. She is interested in the growing presence of artists in the public sphere in the West, and in particular in the integration of arts and culture in Quebec schools. In 2008 Côté became a postdoctoral fellow at the Centre for Research on Ethics of the University of Montreal; her studies are of the relationship between contemporary school and culture.

In 2008, Côté published the fantasy novel Les exilés (The Exiles).

On May 15, 2011, in a record-setting vote, Côté won the first twinned Aurora/Boréal Award for best fantasy or science fiction novel in French for La Tueuse de dragons, with an accompanying prize from SF Canada.

== Works ==
=== Fiction ===
- Les Chroniques de l'Hudres trilogy:
  - Côté, Héloïse (2004). Les Conseillers du roi [The Councilors of the King] (in French). Alire.
  - Côté, Héloïse (2005). Les Enfants du solstice [The Children of the Solstice] (in French). Alire.
  - Côté, Héloïse (2006). L'Ourse et le Boucher [The Bear and the Butcher] (in French). Alire.
- Côté, Héloïse (2008). Les Exilés [The Exiles] (in French). Alire.
- Côté, Héloïse (2010). La Tueuse de dragons [The Woman Who Killed Dragons] (in French). Alire.
- Les Voyageurs trilogy:
  - Côté, Héloïse (2013). Le Frère de Lumière. Alire. ISBN 978-2-89615-087-8.
  - Côté, Héloïse (2013). Le Garçon qui savait lire. Alire. ISBN 978-2-89615-104-2.
  - Côté, Héloïse (2014). La Voix de la Lumière. Alire. ISBN 978-2-89615-113-4.

=== Non-fiction ===
Essays:

- Côté, Héloïse (2005), "Entre culture et esthétique : réflexion sur le rôle de l'enseignement de la littérature dans la formation culturelle des étudiants" [Between culture and aesthetics: a reflection on the role of the teaching of literature in the cultural training of students], Pédagogie collégiale (in French), vol. 19, no. 2, pp. 39–44
- Côté, Héloïse (2006), "En quête d'une approche culturelle appliquée à l'enseignement du français, langue première, au secondaire" [In search of a cultural approach to the teaching of French as a first language, in high school], Les Nouveaux Cahiers de la recherche en éducation (in French), vol. 9, no. 1, pp. 75–89
- Côté, Héloïse; Duquette, Catherine (2007), "Comment penser l'initiation culturelle des élèves dans les classes d'histoire au secondaire? L'approche culturelle dans l'enseignement de l'histoire" [How to think about cultural initiation of students in high school history classes? The cultural approach in the teaching of history], Le Cartable de Clio (in French), no. 7, pp. 208–219

Book:

- Côté, Héloïse; Simard, Denis (2007), Langue et culture dans la classe de français. Une analyse de discours. [Language and culture in the French class. A speech analysis.] (in French), Presses de l'Université Laval, ISBN 978-2-7637-8540-0
