= Chadwick Ginther =

Speculative fiction writer

Chadwick Ginther is a speculative fiction writer based in Winnipeg.

Ginther began his writing career with the Thunder Road trilogy: Thunder Road (2012), Tombstone Blues (2013), and Too Far Gone (2015). All three novels were nominated for the Aurora Award for Best Novel. In 2015, the Winnipeg Free Press named Too Far Gone one of their favourite books of the year. Ginther also published a related short story collection, Wolf and Wing (2017).

Following the Thunder Roll trilogy, Ginther published three standalone books: Graveyard Mind (2018), When the Sky Comes Looking for You (2022), and Khyber (2023).

== Awards and honours ==
In 2016, Ginther and Samantha Beiko were finalists for the Aurora Award for Best Fan Organizational for their work with the Chiaroscuro Reading Series in Winnipeg.

Awards for Ginther's work
Year	Work	Award	Result	Ref.
2013	Thunder Road	Aurora Award for Best Novel	Finalist	
2014	Tombstone Blues	Aurora Award for Best Novel	Finalist	
2016	Too Far Gone	Aurora Award for Best Novel	Finalist	
2019	Graveyard Mind	Aurora Award for Best Novel	Finalist	
2020	"Cheating the Devil at Solitaire"	Sunburst Award for Short Story	Longlisted	
2021	"All Cats Go to Valhalla"	Aurora Award for Best Short Fiction	Won	

== Publications ==
=== Standalone books and collections ===
- Graveyard Mind. ChiZine. 2018. ISBN 978-1-771-48463-3.
- When the Sky Comes Looking for You. Ravenstone. 2022. ISBN 978-0-888-01765-9.
- Khyber. Stranger Fiction. 2023. ISBN 978-1-990-69009-9.

=== Thunder Road trilogy ===
- Thunder Road. Ravenstone. 2012. ISBN 978-0-888-01400-9.
- Tombstone Blues. Ravenstone. 2013. ISBN 978-0-888-01445-0.
- Too Far Gone. Turnstone. 2015. ISBN 978-0-888-01541-9.
- Wolf and Wing: A Thunder Road Collection. A Mythic Fiction Production. 2017.
