= Edward Willett =

American speculative fiction writer (born 1959)

- Born: July 20, 1959 (age 67); Silver City, New Mexico, U.S.
- Education: Harding University
- Occupation: Writer
- Writing career
- Period: 1983-present
- Genres: Science fiction, fantasy, space opera
- Website: www.edwardwillett.com

Edward Willett (born July 20, 1959) is a US/Canadian writer of speculative fiction, predominately known for the Right to Know, Shapers of Worlds, Shards of Excalibur, The Helix War, The Masks of Aygrima, and Worldshapers fiction series. Has written under the pseudonyms Adam Blade, E. C. Blake, and Lee Arthur Chane.

Willett earned a BA in journalism from Harding University, and after graduation took a job as a reporter for the Weyburn Review in Weyburn, Saskatchewan (1980-1984). He was promoted to news editor in 1984. He moved to Regina in 1988, taking a job as communications officer for the Saskatchewan Science Centre (1988-1993). Willett has served as president of SF Canada. He started Shadowpaw Press in 2018. Also in 2018, he began The Worldshapers podcast, interviewing other science fiction and fantasy authors about the creative process. The podcast now features authors in a variety of genres, talking about their latest books. The Worldshapers won the Aurora Award for Best Fan Related Work in 2019. Willett has successfully Kickstarted five anthologies, Shapers of Worlds Volume I, II, III, IV, and V, in 2020, 2021, 2022, 2023, and 2024, respectively, featuring authors featured on the podcast, including work by internationally bestselling and award-winning authors.

== Select Bibliography ==
=== Right to Know ===
- Right to Know (2013)
- Falcon's Egg (2015)

=== Shards of Excalibur ===
- Song of the Sword (2010)
- Twist of the Blade (2014) - nominated for the 2015 Aurora Award for Best YA Novel.
- Lake in the Clouds (2015)
- Cave Beneath the Sea (2015)
- Door Into Faerie (2016) - nominated for the 2017 Aurora Award for Best YA Novel.

=== The Helix War ===
- Marseguro (2008) - won the 2009 Aurora Award for Best Novel.
- Terra Insegura (2009) - nominated for the 2010 Aurora Award for Best Novel.

=== The Masks of Aygrima ===
- Masks (2013) [as by E. C. Blake]
- Shadows (2014) [as by E. C. Blake]
- Faces (2015) [as by E. C. Blake]

=== Worldshapers ===
- Worldshaper (2018)
- Master of the World (2019)
- The Moonlit World (2020)

=== Standalone Novels ===
- Soulworm (1997)
- The Dark Unicorn (1998)
- Andy Nebula, Interstellar Rock Star (1999)
- Spirit Singer (2002)
- Lost In Translation (2005)
- Magebane (2011) [as by Lee Arthur Chane]
- The Haunted Horn (2012)
- Flames of Nevyana (2016)
- The Cityborn (2017)
- Blue Fire (2020) [as by E. C. Blake]
- Star Song (2021) - nominated for the 2022 Aurora Award for Best YA Novel.
- The Tangled Stars (2022)

=== Collections ===
- I Tumble Through the Diamond Dust (2018)
- Paths to the Stars (2018)

=== Nonfiction ===
- J. R. R. Tolkien: Master of Imaginary Worlds (2004)
- Orson Scott Card: Architect of Alternate Worlds (2006)
