= Caitlin Sweet =

Canadian writer

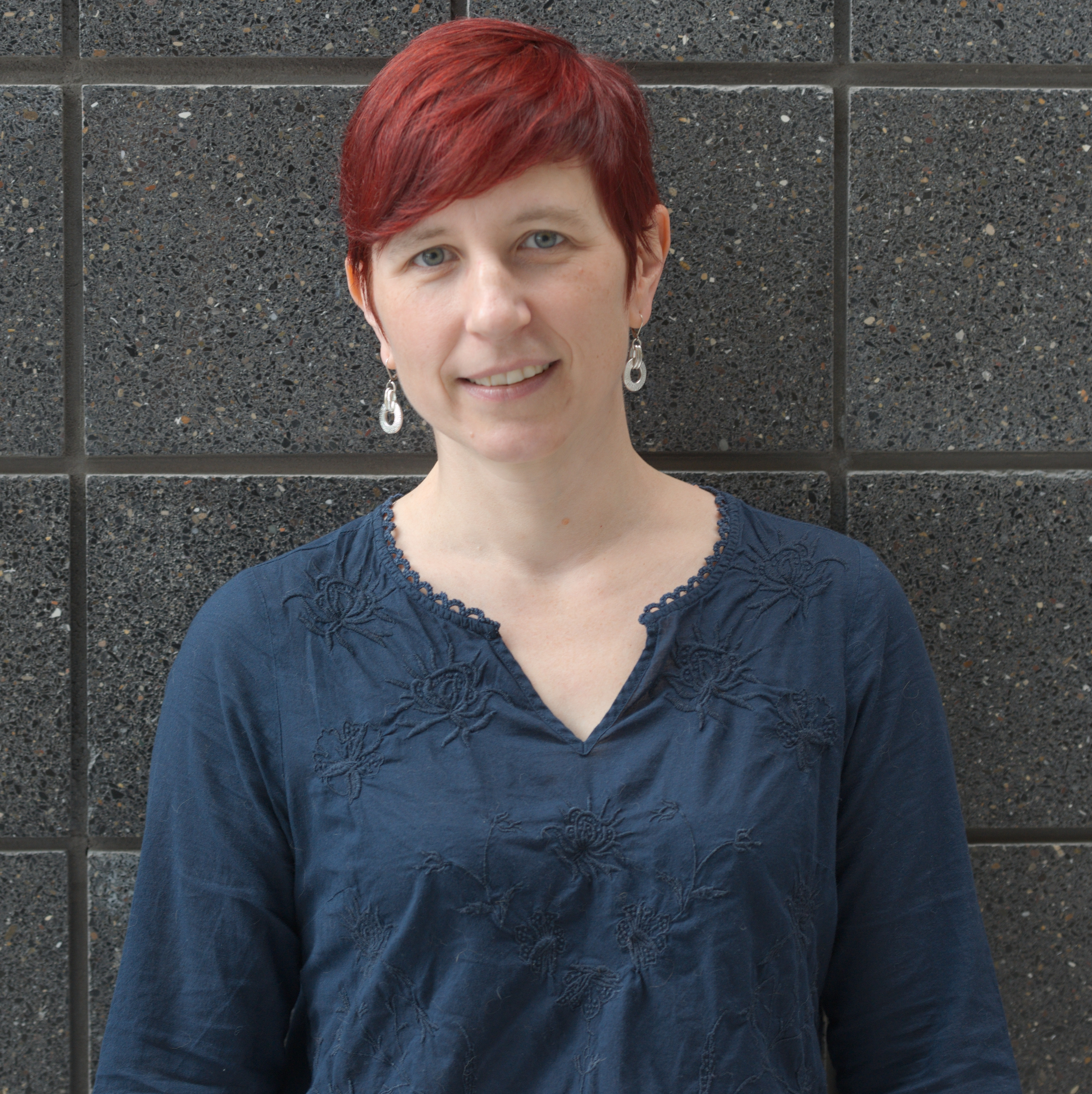
Caitlin Sweet at Worldcon 2014 in London.

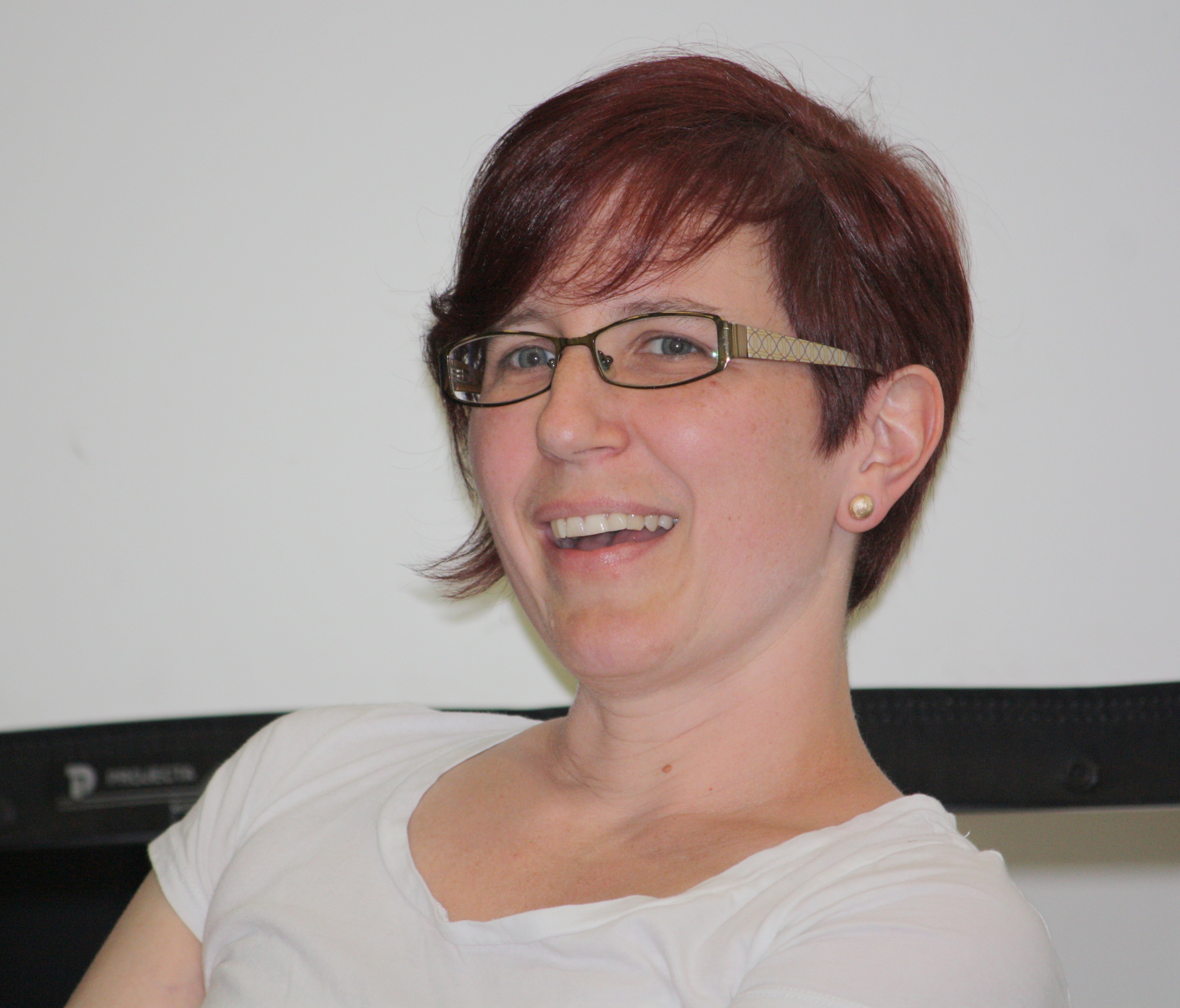
Caitlin Sweet at Finncon 2013 in Helsinki, Finland

Caitlin Sweet is a Canadian fantasy author and writer at the Ontario Government who teaches a genre writing workshop at the University of Toronto's School of Continuing Studies. She lives in Toronto with her family, which includes two children and her husband, hard science fiction author Peter Watts.

== Works ==
- A Telling of Stars (2003) (novel)
- The Silences of Home (2005) (novel)
- The Pattern Scars (2011) (novel)
- The Door in the Mountain (2014) (novel)
- The Flame in the Maze (2015) (novel)
- All the Songs (2024) (novelette) (published in Fusion Fragment #23)

== Awards ==
- A Telling of Stars (2003), finalist at the 2004 Prix Aurora Awards and nominated for the 2004 Locus Awards.; honorable mention for the 2004 Sunburst Award
- The Silences of Home (2005), finalist at the 2006 Prix Aurora Awards.
- The Pattern Scars (2011), finalist for the 2012 Prix Aurora Awards; winner of the 2012 CBC Bookie Award in the Best Science Fiction, Fantasy, or Speculative Fiction category
- The Door in the Mountain (2014), finalist for the Sunburst Award; winner of the Copper Cylinder Award,
- The Flame in the Maze (2015)
