= Jim Davies (cognitive scientist) =

American-Canadian cognitive scientist and dramatist

- Citizenship: United States, Canada
- Education: SUNY Oswego, Georgia Tech
- Scientific career
- Fields: Cognitive Science, Artificial Intelligence
- Workplaces: Carleton University
- Doctoral advisor: Ashok K. Goel, Nancy J. Nersessian

Jim Davies is an American/Canadian cognitive scientist, playwright, artist, and author. He received his bachelor's degree in philosophy from the State University of New York at Oswego, his masters in psychology and his Ph.D. in computer science from the Georgia Institute of Technology. He is a full professor of Cognitive Science at the Department of Cognitive Science and the School of Computer Science at Carleton University in Ottawa, Ontario where he is the director of the Science of Imagination Laboratory. His research focuses on visual reasoning, analogy, and imagination. He has won awards for his teaching, research, podcasting, and filmmaking.

== Biography ==
Jim Davies was born in Glens Falls, New York. He attended Lake George High School and then majored in philosophy at the State University of New York at Oswego, during which he was an exchange student in Beijing, graduating in 1993. He worked in automated text retrieval at the Los Alamos National Laboratory under the supervision of Dr. Timothy Thomas before attending graduate school at the Georgia Institute of Technology, where he received his M.S. in psychology in 1997 under the advisement of Dr. Dorrit Billman. He also received his Ph.D. from Georgia Tech in 2004, under the advisement of philosopher of science Nancy J. Nersessian and artificial intelligence researcher Ashok K. Goel. He worked in bioinformatics as a postdoctoral fellow at Queen's University with Dr. Janice Glasgow and is currently a professor at the Department of Cognitive Science at Carleton University.

== Research ==
Davies studies imagination through the use of computer simulations of visual imagination, which attempt to model the results of studies of how humans typically imagine visual scenes. In addition to his work at the Science of Imagination Laboratory, Davies is editor of the Cognitive Science Summary website and is on the editorial board of The Open Artificial Intelligence Journal. He presented a TEDxCarletonU talk on his research at Carleton on March 30, 2010 and another at Google on August 8, 2010. He has published three books of popular science: Riveted: The Science of Why Jokes Make Us Laugh, Movies Make Us Cry, Religion Makes Us Feel One with the Universe (2014)., Imagination: The Science of Your Mind's Greatest Power (2019), and Being the Person Your Dog Thinks You Are: The Science of a Better You (2021).

== Art ==
Davies is also a comic improvisor, playwright and theater director. He helped found the VisionQuest theater company, cited as one of the best new theater troupes in Atlanta, and for whom he directed The Devil and Ben Jones. As a playwright, his plays include Medea: The Fury and Read It Twice... It's Real, concerning falling in love with robots, was produced by the Sock 'n' Buskin Theatre Company. He was also involved in improv in Atlanta and Kingston and was in a troupe in Ottawa. His serialized fiction, Eve Pixiedrowner and the Micean Council, appeared monthly in Altered Reality Magazine. His 2026 experimental feature film, Are You Still Insisting on the Things You Like?, premiered at the Santa Clarita Film Festival in 2026. It is a longer version of the short film The Things You Like, which won a commendation award from CanadaShorts.

Davies is also a visual artist focusing on non-orthodox calligraphy and Pac-Man art.

== Publications ==
- Davies, J. (2021). Being the Person Your Dog Thinks You Are: The Science of a Better You. ISBN 978-1643136509
- Davies, J. (2019). Imagination: Understanding Our Mind's Greatest Power. ISBN 978-1643132037
- Davies, J. (2014). Riveted: The Science of Why Jokes Make Us Laugh, Movies Make Us Cry, and Religion Makes Us Feel One with the Universe. Palgrave Macmillan. ISBN 978-1-1372-7901-9
- Davies, J., Goel, A. K., & Nersessian, N. J. (2009). "A Computational Model of Visual Analogies in Design". Cognitive Systems Research: Special Issue on Analogies, 10, 204—215.
- Davies, J., & Goel, A. K. (2001). "Visual analogy in problem solving". Proceedings of the Seventeenth International Joint Conference on Artificial Intelligence. 377-382. Morgan Kaufmann publishers.
