= Jack, the Giant Killer (novel) =

1987 fantasy novel by Charles De Lint

- Author: Charles de Lint
- Genre: Fantasy
- Publisher: Ace Hardcover
- Publication date: November 1987
- Media type: Print
- Pages: 202 pp (first edition)
- ISBN: 978-0-441-37970-5
- Followed by: Drink Down the Moon

Jack, the Giant Killer (1987) is a contemporary fantasy novel by Charles De Lint. The book is set in present-day Ottawa (where de Lint himself lives), but incorporates many elements of fantasy, folklore, and myth.

This book was included, along with Drink Down the Moon (1990), in Jack of Kinrowan (1995).

== Plot summary ==
The plot concerns a young woman living in Ottawa named Jacky Rowan who, after a late-night encounter with a motorcycle-riding version of the Wild Hunt, picks up a red cap which enables her to see into the Faerie realms. She is soon drawn into a supernatural struggle between the weakened forces of the Seelie Court and their ominous enemies, the Host or Unseelie Court. She is regaled as the Jack of Kinrowan, a trickster figure who represents the Seelie Court's hope for victory against the forces of evil. With the help of her friend Kate Hazel and an array of faerie friends and allies she makes along the way (and a considerable amount of good luck), Jacky manages to rescue the kidnapped daughter of the Laird of Kinrowan and defeat the Unseelie Court, thus bringing peace and safety to the land.

== See also ==
- Urban fantasy
- Mythic fiction
- Jack the Giant-Killer
