= Crawford Kilian =

Canadian novelist and college professor

- Born: February 7, 1941 (age 85); New York City, New York, U.S.
- Education: Columbia University (BA); Simon Fraser University (MA)
- Occupation: Novelist
- Writing career
- Genres: Fantasy, science fiction, nonfiction

Crawford Kilian (born February 7, 1941) is a Canadian novelist and a college professor. He is also the former public education columnist for the Vancouver Province newspaper. Kilian holds an undergraduate degree from Columbia University and master's degree from Simon Fraser University.

== Biography ==
Born in New York City, Crawford Kilian grew up in Los Angeles and Mexico City. He graduated from Santa Monica High School in 1958 and moved back to New York to attend college. Kilian completed his undergraduate career at Columbia University in 1962.

After graduation, Kilian was drafted into the United States Army where he completed a two-year tour of duty. After his tour of duty, he became a technical writer for the Lawrence Radiation Laboratory in Berkeley, California.

Shortly after he moved to Vancouver, Canada, where he began his education career. Kilian taught in two British Columbia community colleges between 1967 and 2008, of which five months were spent in China from 1983 to 1984. Kilian's first teaching position was at the Vancouver post-secondary institution, Vancouver Community College. Shortly after in 1968, he moved to Capilano College for its inaugural year. After 40 years at Capilano, he retired in the spring of 2008.

Kilian has published hundreds of articles on a wide range of topics including education, science, environment, politics, web writing, and books. After retirement he became a part-time writer-editor for The Tyee, an online newspaper based in Vancouver.

He currently lives in North Vancouver, British Columbia.

== Selected works ==
Title	Published	Publisher	Notes
Wonders, Inc.	1968	Parnassus Press (Berkeley, CA)	A children's book, illustrated by John Larrecq OCLC 1212
The Last Vikings	1973		
The Empire of Time	1978		
Go Do Some Great Thing: The Black Pioneers of British Columbia	1978		2nd, expanded edition 2008
Icequake	1979		
Eyas	1982		
Tsunami	1983		
Exploring British Columbia's Past	1984		
Brother Jonathan	1985		
School Wars: The Assault on B.C. Education	1985		
Lifter	1986		
The Fall of the Republic	1987		
Rogue Emperor	1988		
Gryphon	1989		
Greenmagic	1992		
The Communications Book	1994		
2020 Visions: The Futures of Canadian Education	1995		
Redmagic	1995		
Writing Science Fiction and Fantasy	1998		2nd edition, 2007
Writing for the Web	1999		Republished in 2000, 2006, 2009
Sell Your Nonfiction Book	2009		
