= Candas Jane Dorsey =

Canadian poet and novelist

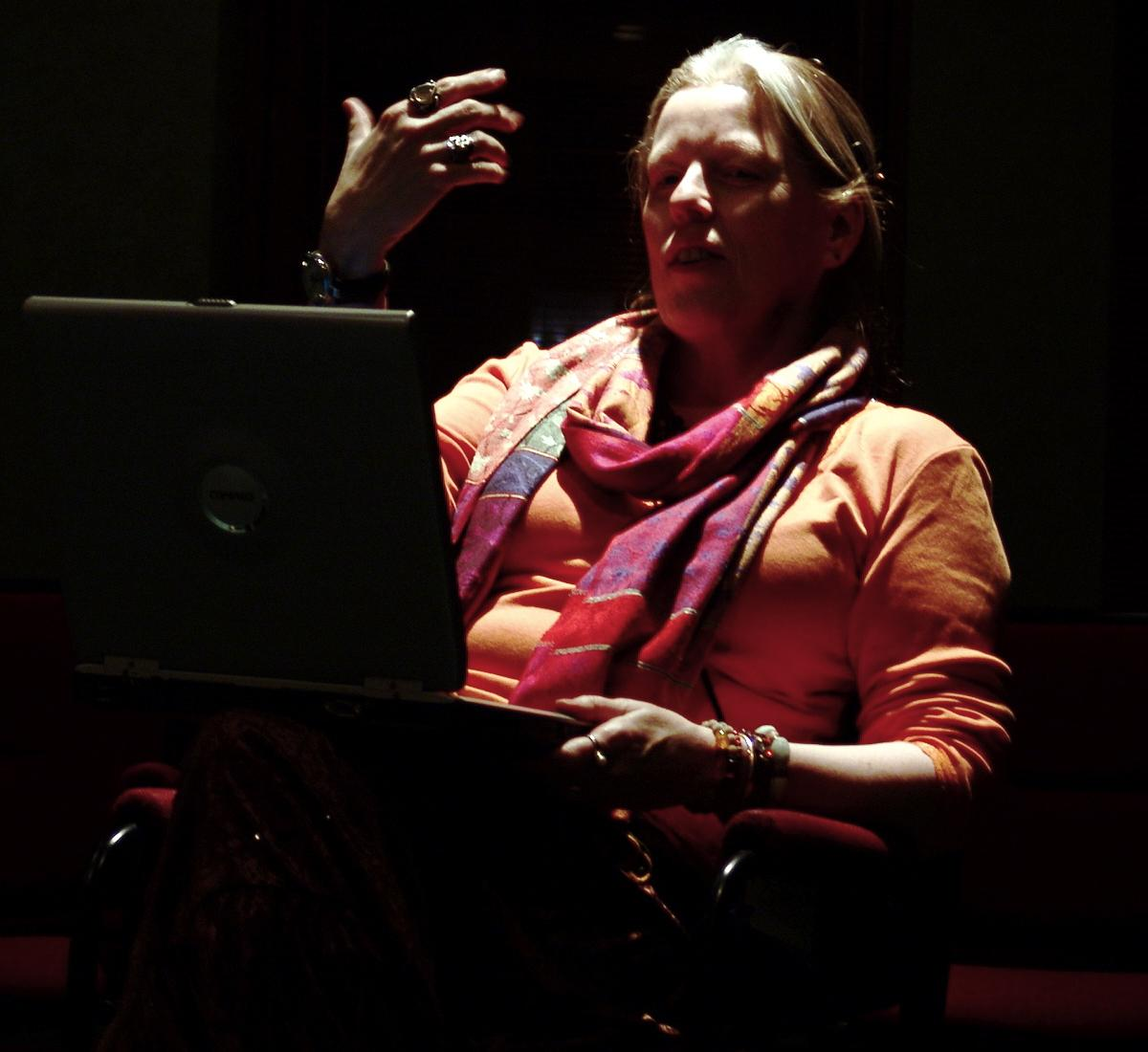
- Candas Jane Dorsey giving a lecture in Montreal in 2006
- Born: November 16, 1952 (age 73); Edmonton, Alberta, Canada
- Writing career
- Notable awards: Crawford Award (1997); Otherwise Award (1997); Aurora Award for Best Novel (1998)
- Website: candasjanedorsey.ca

Candas Jane Dorsey (born November 16, 1952, in Edmonton) is a Canadian poet and science fiction novelist who resides in her hometown of Edmonton, Alberta. She was inducted into the Canadian Science Fiction and Fantasy Association Hall of Fame in 2018.

Dorsey became a writer from an early age and works across genre boundaries, writing poetry, fiction, mainstream and speculative, short and long form, arts journalism and arts advocacy. Dorsey has also written television and stage scripts, magazine and newspaper articles, and reviews. In 1989, Machine Sex and Other Stories was a finalist for the Aurora Award for Best Novel. Her later novel, Black Wine, won the award in 1998; it also won the 1997 Otherwise Award and the 1997 Crawford Award. In 1994, she edited one issue of Prairie Fire magazine, along with With G.N. Louise Jonasson, that focused on Canadian speculative fiction. Dorsey was editor-in-chief of The Books Collective (River, Slipstream and Tesseract Books) from 1992 through 2005.

Dorsey currently teaches and holds workshops and readings. She has served on the executive board of the Writers Guild of Alberta and is a founder of SF Canada.

== Awards ==
Locus included Ice and Other Stories on their list of the best short story collections of 2018.

Awards for Dorsey's work
Year	Work	Award	Result	Ref.
1989	Machine Sex and Other Stories	Aurora Award for Best Novel	Finalist	
1997	Black Wine	Otherwise Award	Winner	
1997	Black Wine	Crawford Award	Winner	
1998	Black Wine	Aurora Award for Best Novel	Winner	
2022	Food of My People	Aurora Award for Best Related Work	Finalist	

== Publications ==
=== Novels ===
- Results of the Ring Toss (1976)
- Hardwired Angel (1987)
- Leaving Marks (1992)
- Black Wine (1997)
- A Paradigm of Earth (2001)
- The Story of My Life Ongoing by CS Cobb (2022)
- At the Freak Show (2026)

==== Epitome Apartments series ====
- The Adventures of Isabel: A Postmodern Mystery, By the Numbers (2020)
- What's the Matter with Mary Jane? (2021)
- He Wasn’t There Again Today (2023)

=== Collections ===
- Machine Sex and Other Stories (1988)
- Vanilla and Other Stories (2000)
- Ice & Other Stories (2018)

=== Anthologies ===
- Tesseracts 3 with Gerry Truscott (1990)
- Tesseracts 8 with John Clute (1999)
- Land/Space: An Anthology of Prairie Speculative Fiction with Judy McCrosky (2002)
- Food of My People with Ursula Pflug (2021)
