= Jean-Pierre Guillet =

French-Canadian writer (born 1953)

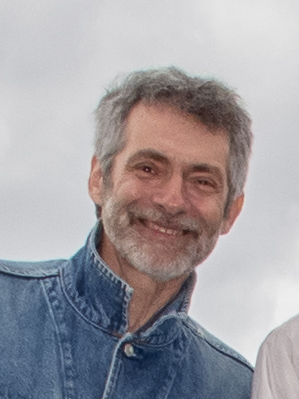
- Born: June 9, 1953 (age 73); Iberville, Quebec, Canada
- Occupations: Writer, Biologist
- Writing career
- Genre: science fiction
- Website: www.jeanpierreguillet.info

Jean-Pierre Guillet is a French-Canadian writer born in Iberville, Quebec, in 1953.

He received the 1998 Aurora Award for best science-fiction novel in French for the story of an expedition to Mars, L'Odyssée du Pénélope(The Odyssey of the Penelope). He was also nominated for the 2004 Aurora Award for La cage de Londres (The London Pen), a sequel to H.G.Wells' The War of the Worlds.

== Bibliography ==
- IN FRENCH
- Le Paradis perdu, Saint-Lambert : Éditions Héritage, 1991, ISBN 2762567548
- La Poudre magique, Waterloo : Éditions Michel Quintin, 1992, ISBN 2-920438-42-5
- Mystère aux Îles-de-la-Madeleine, Waterloo : Éditions Michel Quintin, 1992, ISBN 2-89435-004-X
- Enquête sur la falaise, Waterloo : Éditions Michel Quintin, 1992, ISBN 2-89435-003-1
- La fête est à l'eau! Waterloo : Éditions Michel Quintin, 1993, ISBN 2-89435-020-1
- Destinées, Saint-Lambert : Éditions Héritage, 1993, ISBN 2-7625-7146-4
- La Machine à bulles, Waterloo : Éditions Michel Quintin, 1994, ISBN 2-89435-035-X
- Tadam! Saint-Lambert : Éditions Héritage, 1995, ISBN 2-7625-7034-4
- Mystère et boule de poil! Saint-Lambert : Éditions Héritage, 1995, ISBN 2-7625-4075-5
- L'odyssée du Pénélope, Saint-Lambert : Éditions Héritage, 1997, ISBN 2-7625-8470-1
- Opération Papillon, Montréal : Éditions Pierre Tisseyre, 1999, ISBN 2-89051-726-8
- Le Monstre du lac Champlain, Saint-Laurent : Éditions Pierre Tisseyre, 2000, ISBN 2-89051-754-3
- Les Visiteurs des ténèbres, Saint-Laurent : Éditions Pierre Tisseyre, 2001, ISBN 2-89051-807-8
- La Cage de Londres, Québec : Alire, 2003, ISBN 2-922145-71-9
- La Puce co(s)mique et le rayon bleuge, Saint-Alphonse-de-Granby : Éditions de la Paix, 2004, ISBN 2-922565-98-X
- Le Fils de Bougainville, Saint-Laurent : Éditions Pierre Tisseyre, 2004, ISBN 2-89051-908-2
- Le Monde du Lac-en-Ciel, Saint-Laurent : Éditions Pierre Tisseyre, 2006, ISBN 2-89051-992-9
- Les Pirates du Lac-en-Ciel, Rosemère : Éditions Pierre Tisseyre, 2011, ISBN 978-2-89633-175-8
- Enquête spatiale, Montréal : Médiaspaul, 2012, ISBN 9782894209059
- SOS au lac des Glaces, Montréal; Paris : Médiaspaul, 2013, ISBN 9782894209165
- Le Catalogue de robots, Montréal : Bayard Canada livres, 2013. ISBN 9782895795391
- Le Capitaine Poulet, Montréal : Bayard Canada livres, 2013, ISBN 9782895795063
- L'Enfant des glaces, Montréal; Paris : Médiaspaul, 2015, ISBN 9782894209684
- SOS en Antarctique T.1: Le monde du Lac-des-glaces, Rosemère : Éditions Pierre Tisseyre, 2020, ISBN 978-2-89633-459-9
- Clash sous la glace T.2: Le monde du Lac-des-glaces, Rosemère : Éditions Pierre Tisseyre, 2022, ISBN 978-2-89633-460-5
- Dégel T.3: Le monde du Lac-des-glaces, Rosemère: Éditions Pierre Tisseyre, 2022, ISBN 978-2-89633-461-2
- La bariolée de l'Île-Mère, Montréal : Québec-Amérique, 2022, ISBN 978-2-76444-679-9
- Les bibittes sont cuites, Montréal: Éditions Michel Quintin, 2024, ISBN 978-2-89762-846-8
- IN ENGLISH:
- The Magic Powder, 1992, ISBN 2-920438-72-7
- The Magdalen Islands Mystery, 1992, ISBN 2-89435-014-7
- The cliff case, 1992, ISBN 2-89435-016-3
- Castle Chaos, 1993, ISBN 2-89435-022-8
- The Bubble Machine, 1994, ISBN 9782894350331
- The Odyssey of the Penelope, 2018, ISBN 978-0-9950710-0-1
- The London pen, 2018, ISBN 978-0-9950710-9-4
