= Tisab Ting =

1896 novel by Ida May Ferguson

- Author: Ida May Ferguson (as "Dyjan Fergus")
- Original title: Tisab Ting; or, The Electrical Kiss.
- Language: English
- Genre: Science fiction
- Publisher: The Hunter, Rose Co. Ltd., Toronto
- Publication date: 1896
- Publication place: Canada
- Media type: book
- Pages: 300

Tisab Ting, or, The Electrical Kiss is an 1896 Canadian science fiction novel, written by Ida May Ferguson of New Brunswick under the pseudonym Dyjan Fergus. The book is set in late 20th century Montreal and features an "electrical genius": a "learned Chinaman" who woos and wins a Canadian wife through his superior scientific knowledge as embodied in "the Electrical Kiss."

The book is an early version of the melodrama as social commentary. The key idea of a device capable of forcing one to love another against their will could have been a complex exploration of a woman's thoughts and feelings and whether they are artificially induced. However, according to a contemporary reviewer, the admitted novelty of the subject matter and plot of this "startling" work did not excuse this "young lady writer" for writing which was weak and without skill (it was her first and apparently only book). It is of interest mainly because of its early publication date. The University of Alberta Libraries published a microfiche copy of the book in 1980.

The SF Encyclopedia noted that the book's "speculative elements are relatively minor".
