= Shirley Meier =

Canadian author

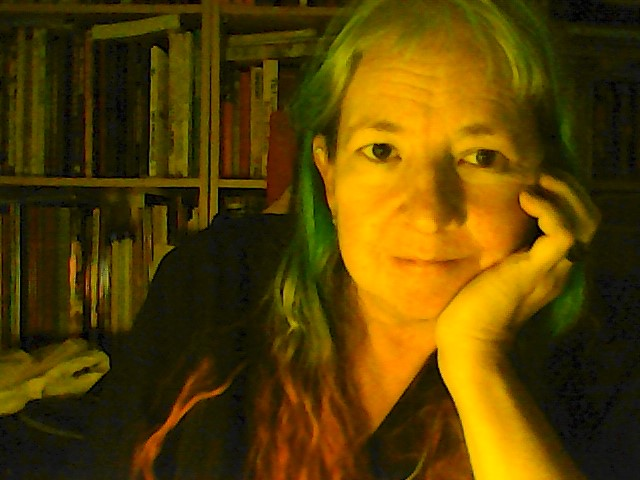
- Born: 1960 (age 65–66); Woodstock, Ontario
- Education: University of Western Ontario

Shirley Meier is a Canadian author of science fiction and fantasy. In addition to her own fiction she has also collaborated with S. M. Stirling, Steve White, and Karen Wehrstein.

== Background ==
Shirley Meier was born in Woodstock, Ontario in 1960. She studied English at the University of Western Ontario, graduating in 1991. She lives in Toronto. She was active in the Bunch of Seven, a Canadian speculative fiction writing group in the 1980s.

She received a black belt in Tao Zen Chuan karate in 1991, and has been an instructor of karate and Women's Self-Defense for several years.

Meier has been active in science fiction Conventions in Toronto, serving on committees for Ad Astra and SFContario.

She is an avid equestrian, and has taught riding and horseback archery for several years.

== Writing ==
=== Non-Fiction ===
Meier is a regular columnist for Amazing Stories and other publications.

=== Novels ===
==== Fifth Millennium series ====
- The Sharpest Edge (NAL, 1986), with S. M. Stirling
- The Cage (Baen Books, 1989), with S. M. Stirling
- Shadow's Daughter (Baen Books, 1991)
- Shadow's Son (Baen Books, 1991), with S. M. Stirling and Karen Wehrstein
- Saber & Shadow (Baen Books, 1992), with S. M. Stirling

===== Eclipse Court series =====
The tales of Minis Aan, exiled heir to the Crystal Throne of Arko, escaping from a corrupt and decadent empire to establish a new civilization of democracy and hope.

- Blood Marble: Eclipse Court Book One (Lutria Press, 2021)
- Gilded Filth: Eclipse Court Book Two (Lutria Press, 2021)
- Prince Under The Mountain: Eclipse Court Book Three (Lutria Press, 2021)
- Scholar's Run: Eclipse Court Book Four (Lutria Press, 2022)
- Burning Crystal: Eclipse Court Book Five (Lutria Press, 2021)
- From Eclipse to Diamond Sun Court: Eclipse Court Book Six (Lutria Press 2023)
- Minis Neverborn: Eclipse Court Book Seven (Lutria Press 2023)
- Riven By The Sun: Eclipse Court Book Eight (Lutria Press 2024)

==== Starfire series ====
- Exodus (Baen Books, 2007), with Steve White

==== Two Gods, Two Worlds series ====
- Sparks in the Wind, e-book and print on demand
- "Shadow of a Soul on Fire" by Henchman Press (ISBN 978-1-941620-37-3 July 2018)

==== Stand Alone Novels ====
- Walls of the Sleepers (Henchman Press, e-release, November 2023)

=== Young Adult Fiction ===
- Lamia's Daughter, (Huntress Press, 2020), e-book and print on demand (ISBN 978-1-941620-48-9

=== Short fiction ===
- "Peacock Eyes", Friends of the Witch World 2 anthology
- "Trave", Magic in Ithkar 4
- "The Witches' Tree", Northern Frights; audio adaptation for Fears for Ears CD
- "Ice", Northern Frights II
- "You're It ", Bolos: The Unconquerable (Baen Books)
- "Pursued by the Tauwu", Rogues In Hell (2011)
- "Under the Bed", What Scares the Bogeyman(2011)
- "The Other Musgrave Ritual", (Terror by Gaslight from Iron Clad Press) 2014
- "Garden Party", (Dark Corners, Night Chills 2, anthology) 2016
- "The Last Parade"
- "An Arrow's Flight", "Amazing Stories" 2018
- "Seal Hunt", Migration Anthology 2019 by "Other Worlds Ink" (Honorable Mention for Queer Sci-Fi Flash Fiction Competition)
- "SwanMaiden's Daughter", "Of Fae and Fate" Anthology 2019
- "Buyer Beware, Amazing Stories 2019
- "Upon Reflection", Clarity Anthology 2021 by "Other Worlds Ink"N
- "War Plan Red", The Dance Anthology, 2024
- "Bugfuck", Not to Yield anthology, editor Michael H. Hanson and Edward McKeown, Three Ravens Publishing, 2025
- "An Arrow's Flight" (reprint), anthology, "Audacity and Adversity", Lawrence Schoen, Editor, 2026

=== Published in Etaerio ===
Anthology from Alternative Reality News Service, editor Ira Nayman, 2025

- "Tremendous Debut: Mosquito Lake Has Bite!"
- "Ice in a Major Key"
- "Dealing With the Wolf at the Chimes"
- "Why Dickie's Foodland Will Have Manual Doors"
- "The Last Parade"

=== Poetry ===
- "Mummy Bones" (in Tessaracts 7)
- "Flowers and Vice" (poetry book)
- "The Love Machine" (poetry book)
- "Angelwings in My Coffee" (poetry book)
- "Underhill Transit Service"; Lutria press 2023, ebook, paperback

== Artwork ==
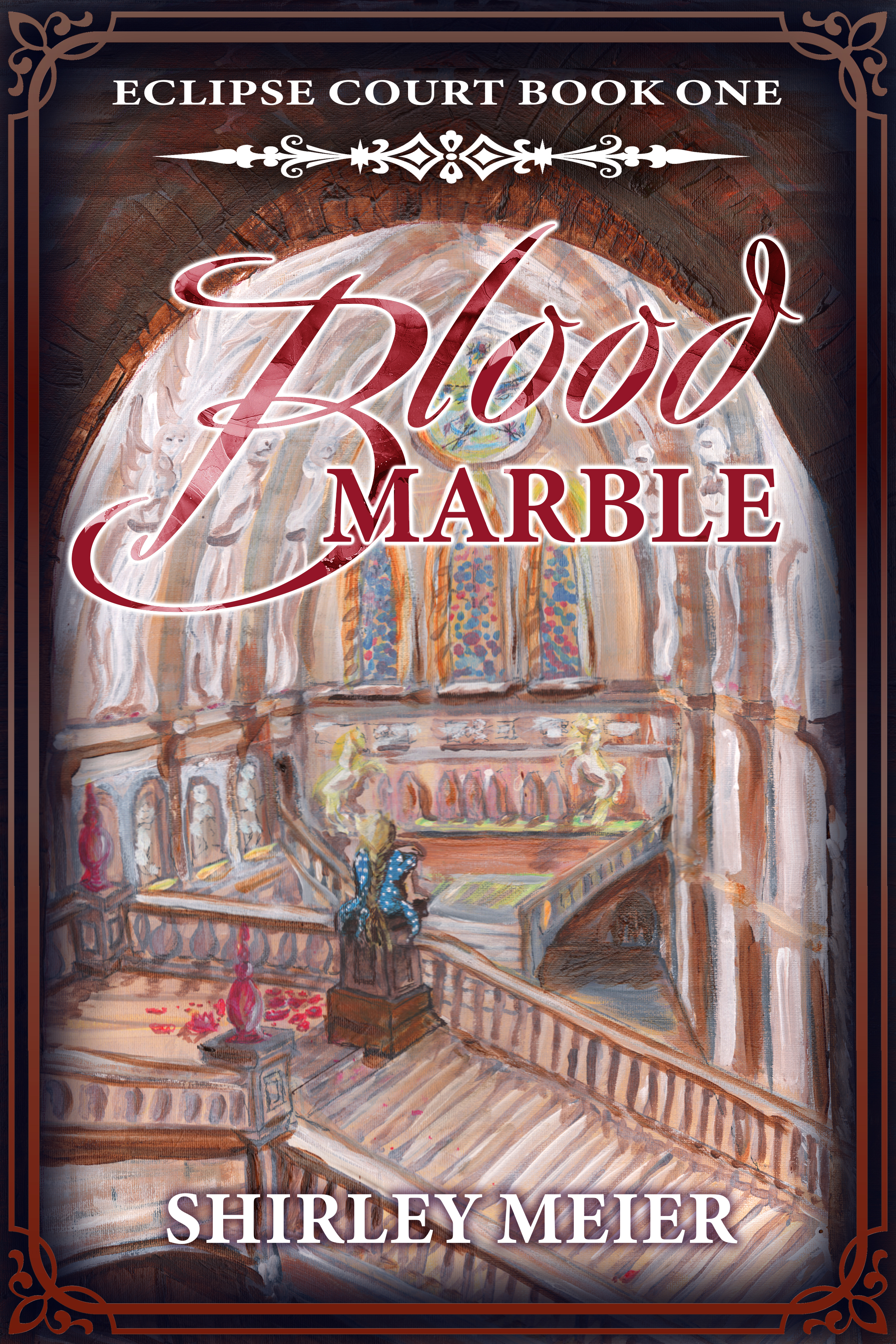

cover: (with design by Karen Wehrstein) Sparks in the Wind;

cover: (front and back) for Shadow of a Soul on Fire;

cover: (front cover) Lamia's Daughter;

cover: Blood Marble: Book One of Eclipse Court;

cover: Gilded Filth: Book Two of Eclipse Court;

cover: Scholar's Run: Book Four of Eclipse Court;

cover: Burning Crystal: Book Five of Eclipse Court;

five sumi ink drawings; Dragon's Eye acrylic painting on 30 cm canvas;

cover: From Eclipse to Diamond Sun Court;Book Six of Eclipse Court

A number of drawings (6) sold to Sydney, Australia (2017)

cover: Minis Neverborn: Book Seven of Eclipse Court

cover: Riven By The Sun: Book Eight of Eclipse Court

"Blue Whale" acrylic on canvas 24 x 36 inches (sold June 2024)
