= Fiona Patton =

Canadian fantasy author (born 1962)

- Born: 1962 (age 63–64); Calgary, Alberta, Canada
- Occupation: Novelist
- Spouse: Tanya Huff
- Writing career
- Genre: Fantasy

Fiona Patton (born 1962) is a Canadian fantasy author. She has written more than 50 short stories including within the genres heroic fantasy, horror and science fiction and is well known for her The Warriors of Estavia series.

Born in Calgary, Alberta, Patton moved to the United States in 1966. In 1975, she returned to Canada with her family, settling in Toronto. In 1992, she moved with her wife Tanya Huff to rural Ontario. She currently works as a counsellor for the developmentally handicapped.

== Bibliography ==
=== The Branion Realm ===
1. The Stone Prince New York: DAW, 1997.
2. The Painter Knight New York: DAW, 1998.
3. The Granite Shield New York: DAW, 1999.
4. The Golden Sword New York: DAW, 2001.

=== Warriors of Estavia ===
1. The Silver Lake New York: DAW, 2005.
2. The Golden Tower New York: DAW, 2008.
3. The Shining City New York: DAW, 2011.

=== Additional short stories ===
- "Anisoptera with a Side Order of Soft Blast" in The Clan Chronicles: Tales from Plexis, 2020
- "A Dying Life" in Mob Magic: DAW, 1998
- "Heritage" in Warrior Fantastic: DAW, 2000
- "Death Mage" in Villains Victorious
- "The Hero of Killorglin" in Fantasy Gone Wrong: 2007
- "The Silver Path" in The Dimension Next Door
- "The Blood of the People": 2009
- "The White Bull of Tara" in Zombie Raccoons & Killer Bunnies: 2009
- "The King's Own" in Bless Your Mechanical Heart
- "The Huntsman"
- "Revenge Is A Dish Best Served With Beers"
- "The wild rogue" in Elementary: All-New Tales of the Elemental Masters
- "The Svedali Foundlings" in Assassin Fantastic: 2007
- "The Sins of the Sons" in If I Were An Evil Overlord
- "The Children of Diardin: To Find the Advantage" in Women of War
- "The Three Gems of the Fianna" in Maiden, Matron, Crone
- "The Raven's Quest" in Magical Beginnings
- "Lucky Charm" in The Bakka anthology: 2002
- "The Blood of the People" in Army of the Fantastic
- "Coin of the Realm" in Slipstreams
- "The Sentry" in Human for a Day: 2011
- in Fellowship Fantastic: 2007
- "Brothers in the flesh" in The Repentant
- "Family Trees" in Mythspring: From the Lyrics and Legends of Canada
- "The Sacred Waters of Kane" in Oceans of Magic: 2001
- in Camelot Fantastic
- in Imaginary Friends
- "Family" in The Mutant Files
- "Games of Fate" in Pharaoh Fantastic
- "The Trade" in Children of Magic: 2006
- in Apprentice Fantastic
- in Warrior Fantastic
- "Overwater" in By the Light of Camelot
- "Heartsease" in Sirius The Dog Star
- in Once Upon a Galaxy
- in Little Red Riding Hood in the Big Bad City
- "Captain of the Dead" in Knight Fantastic
- "Makana" in Elemental Magic: 2012
- "The Watchmen" Miniseries, in multiple Valdemar anthologies
