= Terence M. Green =

Canadian writer (1947–2025)

Terence Michael Green (2 February 1947 – 19 December 2025) was a Canadian science-fiction and fantasy writer. He published short stories and novels, among the best received of which is Children of the Rainbow (1992). His works focused on characterization and explored the complexity of social relationships.

== Early life and education ==
Green was born in Toronto, Ontario to Thomas and Margaret. He received a BA in English in 1967 from the University of Toronto, an MA from University College, Dublin, and a BEd in 1973 from the University of Toronto.

== Career ==
Green published both short stories and novels. His first Canadian publication was "Of Children in the Ffoliage", which was included in Aurora: New Canadian Writing 1979, and his first US publication was "Till Death Do Us Part", in The Magazine of Fantasy & Science Fiction in December 1981. His first collaboration was "Twenty-Two Steps to the Apocalypse" with Andrew Weiner, in Asimov's Science Fiction in January 1988.

Green's first novel was Barking Dogs (1988), an expanded version of a 1984 short story of the same title following a Toronto policeman in a crime-ridden near future. In this world it is possible to buy portable lie detectors ("barking dogs"), which affect how justice and social relationships change as a result of being able to discern when someone is not telling the truth.

Four years later, Green published the more highly acclaimed Children of the Rainbow (1992). It is a time travel novel, which combines elements of Mutiny on the Bounty, anti-nuclear protests, and Inca religion. Douglas Barbour of Canadian Forum wrote that Green was "very good at showing the psychological disruption the time shifts create in his two central characters".

In Shadow of Ashland (1996), an expanded short story, Green drew on his own life and that of his family to write about a son's search for his dying mother's brother. Malachy Duffy of The New York Times Book Review praised the novel's "dedication to exploring its underlying themes of redemption, resolution and homecoming". This novel has been described as "closer to 'magic realism' than to traditional science fiction". Green wrote two sequels to Shadow of Ashland that continued to explore these familiar themes: A Witness to Life (1999) and St. Patrick's Bed (2001).

The year after Shadow of Ashland, Green published Blue Limbo (1997), a futuristic thriller that follows the same policeman from Barking Dogs. At the center of the novel is the "Blue Limbo" technique, which allows the dead to be brought back to consciousness, and a rogue cop's desire to avenge the murder of his partner.

Green's style has been described as "quiet" and "restrained". The St. James Guide to Science Fiction Writers contends that his "science fiction is quintessentially Canadian, with its graceful focus on characterization, its rhetorical understatement, its placing of characters in a complex social environment, as well as its refusal to explore technology for itself alone."

== Personal life and death ==
In 1968, Green married Penny Dakin, whom he divorced in 1990; they have two sons, Conor and Owen. He married Merle Casci in 1994, with whom he has one son, Daniel. Green retired from teaching English at East York Collegiate Institute, where he worked from 1968, and later taught creative-writing part-time at Western University (London, Ontario, Canada). Green died on 19 December 2025, at the age of 78.

== Awards ==
- 3 Canada Council for the Arts Grants in 1992 (2), and 2003
- 4 Ontario Arts Council Grants in 1991 through 1993
- 2 Toronto Arts Council Grants in 2000, 2002

2-time World Fantasy Award nominee (1997, 2000); 5-time Prix Aurora Award nominee (1990 through 1998)

== Works ==
This selected list of works is taken from Contemporary Authors Online:

=== Novels ===
- Children of the Rainbow (1992)
- Sailing Time's Ocean (2006)

==== Mitch Helwig ====
- Barking Dogs (1988)
- Blue Limbo (1997)

==== Shadow of Ashland ====
- Shadow of Ashland (1996)
- A Witness to Life (1999)
- St. Patrick's Bed (2001)

=== Collection ===
- The Woman Who Is the Midnight Wind (1987)
