= Yves Meynard =

Canadian writer

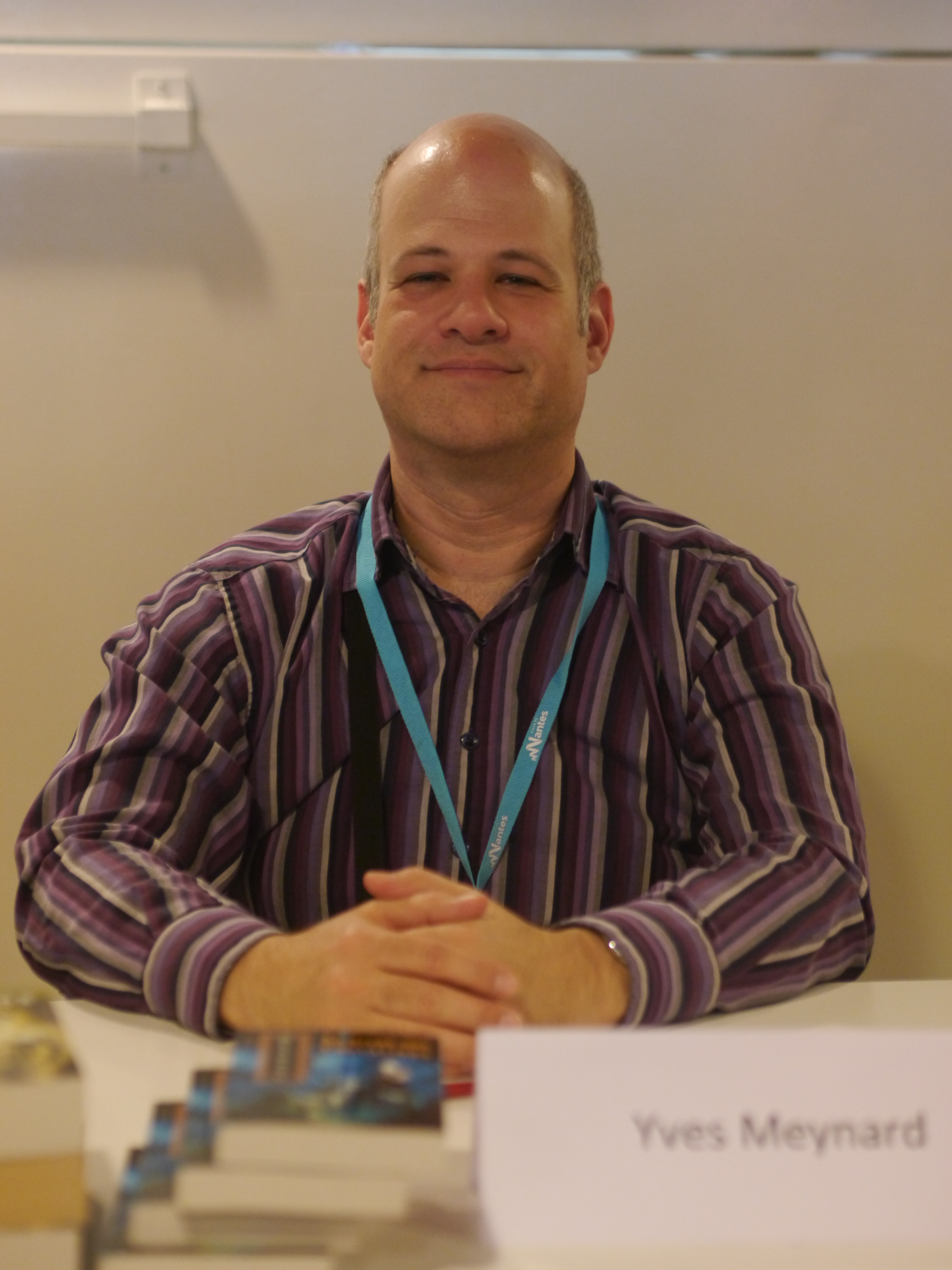
- Yves Meynard in 2014
- Born: 13 June 1964 (age 62); Quebec City, Quebec, Canada
- Occupation: Author
- Writing career
- Genres: Science fiction, Fantasy
- Notable works: La rose du désert, The Book of Knights (novel), Le livre des chevaliers, Le mage des fourmis
- Website: pages.videotron.com/ymeynard//

Yves Meynard (born 13 June 1964) is a Canadian science fiction and fantasy writer. He writes in both English and French.

== Biography ==
Meynard made his debut as an author in 1986 at the Boréal congress in Longueuil. Along with Philippe Gauthier and Claude J. Pelletier, he launched the fanzine Samizdat. Meynard became literary director for the magazine Solaris from 1994-2002. He has received a number of literary awards, including four Aurora Awards, three Boréal Prizes, and the Quebec Grand Prize for Science Fiction and Fantasy in 1994 (now the Jacques-Brossard Award for Science Fiction and Fantasy).

In 1998, Meynard published The Book of Knights in English with Tor Books, released in French as Le livre des chevaliers under the Alire imprint in 1999. He also writes works for young adults, and published Le mage des fourmis (The Ant Mage) with Mediaspaul in 1995. He received the Aurora Award for best novel (La rose du désert) in 1997.

He has collaborated with the Quebec author Élisabeth Vonarburg, and regularly collaborates with Jean-Louis Trudel under the collective name Laurent McAllister.

His fantasy novels Le vaisseau des tempêtes and Prince des glaces were adapted into the 2026 animated children's film Lydia and the Mist Rider (Lydia et le vaisseau des tempêtes).

== Works published in English ==
=== Novels ===
- The Book of Knights (1998)
- Chrysanthe (2012)

=== Collection ===
- Angels & Exiles (2015)

=== Anthology ===
- Tesseracts 5 with Robert Runté (1996)
