= Jean-Louis Trudel =

Canadian science fiction writer (1967–2025)

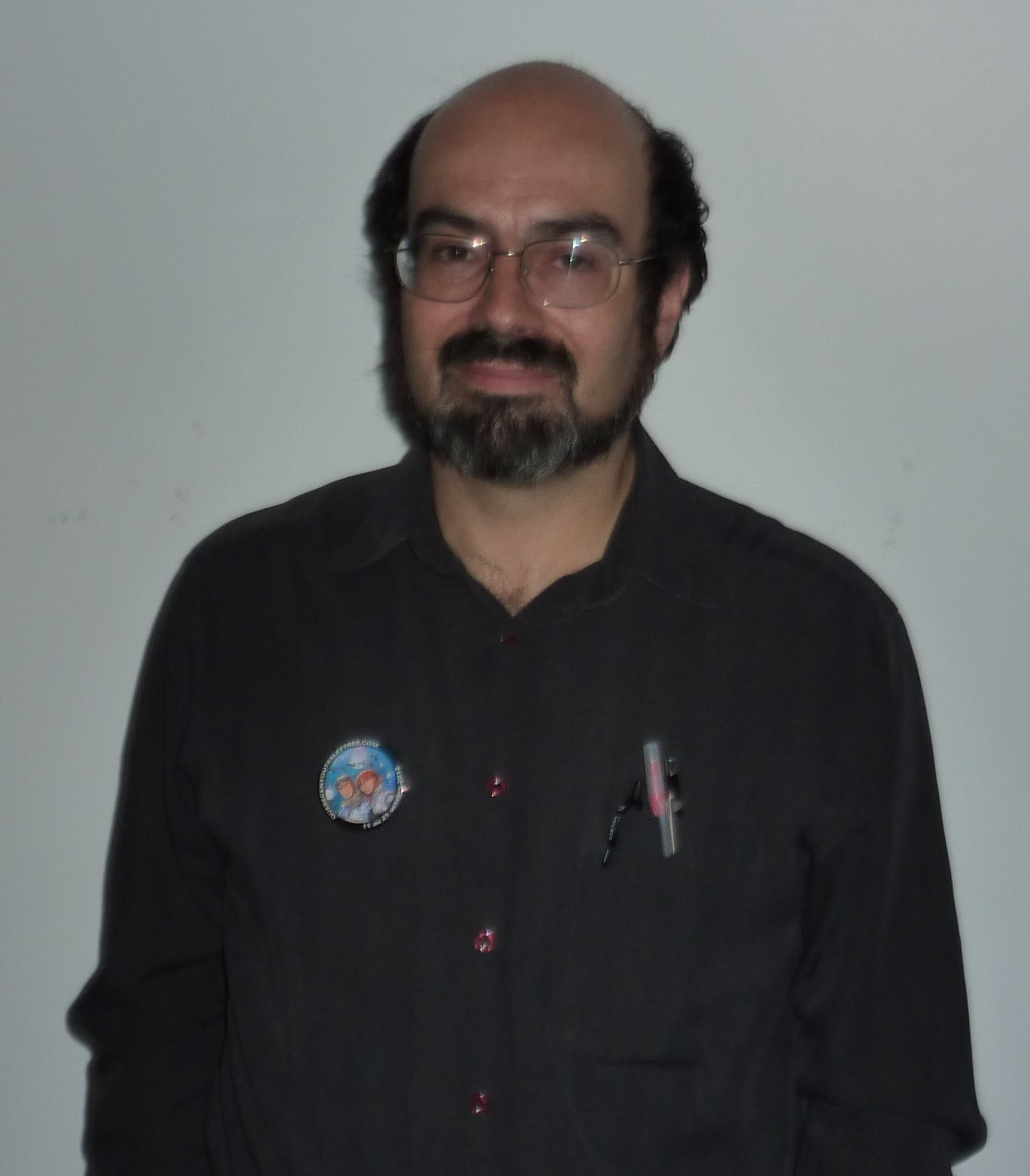
Trudel at the conference "Les Asimov québécois" ("The Asimovs of Québec") for the Quebec City literature festival, October 2012.

Jean-Louis Trudel (1967 – November 17, 2025) was a Canadian science fiction writer. He also taught history part-time at the University of Ottawa.

== Life and career ==
Trudel was born in Toronto, Ontario, Canada and lived in Toronto, Ottawa, and Montreal before moving to Quebec City, Quebec in 2010.

While he wrote mainly in French, he authored a few stories in English, published in such venues as Asimov's Science Fiction (January-February 2020), On Spec and Tales of the Shadowmen. Other stories in English and other languages (Greek, Portuguese, Italian, Russian) have appeared in translation.

Most of his books, for adults and young adults, are science fiction, but a few titles may also be classed as fantasy. A long-time contributor to Solaris magazine, he was also a science-fiction critic and historian.

Under the collective name Laurent McAllister, Trudel and Yves Meynard have written three young adult books as part of an ongoing series, as well as several stories.

He received several literary distinctions, including the "Grand Prix de la Science-Fiction et du Fantastique québécois" in 2001 and several Prix Aurora awards.

Trudel died on November 17, 2025, at the age of 58.

== Bibliography ==
- Aller simple pour Saguenal (YA novel, Paulines, Jeunesse-Pop # 91, 1994)
- Pour des soleils froids (novel, Éditions Fleuve Noir, Anticipation # 1942, 1994)
- Un trésor sur Serendib (YA novel, Médiaspaul, Jeunesse-Pop # 94, 1994)
- Le ressuscité de l'Atlantide (novel, Éditions Fleuve Noir, Anticipation # 1955, 1994)
- Les Voleurs de mémoire (YA novel, Médiaspaul, Jeunesse-Pop # 97, 1995)
- Les Rescapés de Serendib (Les Mystères de Serendib --- 1), (YA novel, Médiaspaul, Jeunesse-Pop # 102, 1995)
- Le Prisonnier de Serendib (Les Mystères de Serendib --- 2), (YA novel, Médiaspaul, Jeunesse-Pop # 103, 1995)
- Les Princes de Serendib (Les Mystères de Serendib --- 3), (YA novel, Médiaspaul, Jeunesse-Pop # 110, 1996)
- Des Colons pour Serendib (Les Mystères de Serendib --- 4), (YA novel, Médiaspaul, Jeunesse-Pop # 111, 1996)
- Fièvres sur Serendib (Les Mystères de Serendib --- 5), (YA novel, Médiaspaul, Jeunesse-Pop # 116, 1996)
- Un printemps à Nigelle (YA novel, Médiaspaul, Jeunesse-Pop, # 117, 1997)
- Un été à Nigelle (YA novel, Médiaspaul, Jeunesse-Pop, # 120, 1997)
- Un hiver à Nigelle (YA novel, Médiaspaul, Jeunesse-Pop, # 124, 1997)
- Les bannis de Bételgeuse (YA novel, Médiaspaul, Jeunesse-Pop, # 125, 1998)
- 13,5 km sous Montréal (YA novel, Marie-France, La Mangeuse de Lune, 1998)
- Un automne à Nigelle (YA novel, Médiaspaul, Jeunesse-Pop, # 128, 1998)
- Les Contrebandiers de Cañaveral (YA novel, Médiaspaul, Jeunesse-Pop # 132, 1999)
- Nigelle par tous les temps (YA novel, Médiaspaul, coll. Jeunesse-Pop # 135, 2000)
- Demain, les étoiles (YA collection, Pierre Tisseyre, coll. Chacal #, 2000)
- Guerre pour un harmonica (YA novel, Médiaspaul, coll. Jeunesse-Pop # 139, 2000)
- Le messager des orages (YA novel, Médiaspaul, Jeunesse-Pop # 140, 2001) (in collaboration with Yves Meynard, as Laurent McAllister)
- Les transfigurés du Centaure (YA novel, Médiaspaul, Jeunesse-Pop # 143, 2001)
- Le revenant de Fomalhaut (YA novel, Médiaspaul, Jeunesse-Pop # 145, 2002)
- Jonctions impossibles (collection, Vermillon, Parole vivante # 47, 2003)
- Sur le chemin des tornades (YA novel, Médiaspaul, Jeunesse-Pop # 148, 2003) (in collaboration with Yves Meynard, as Laurent McAllister)
- Le perroquet d'Altaïr (YA novel, Médiaspaul, Jeunesse-Pop # 149, 2003)
- La lune des jardins sans soleil (YA novel, Médiaspaul, Jeunesse-Pop # 150, 2003)
- La princesse de Tianjin (YA novel, Médiaspaul, Jeunesse-Pop # 153, 2004)
- Les insurgés de Tianjin (YA novel, Médiaspaul, Jeunesse-Pop # 154, 2004)
- Le maître des bourrasques (YA novel, Médiaspaul, Jeunesse-Pop # 161, 2006) (in collaboration with Yves Meynard, as Laurent McAllister)
