= Phyllis Gotlieb =

Canadian novelist and poet

- Phyllis Gotlieb in 1982
- Born: Phyllis Fay Bloom; May 25, 1926; Toronto, Ontario
- Died: July 14, 2009 (aged 83); Toronto, Ontario
- Resting place: Pardes Shalom Cemetery, Vaughan, Ontario, Canada
- Education: University of Toronto
- Occupations: Poet, novelist
- Spouse: Calvin Gotlieb (m. 1949)
- Children: Leo Gotlieb; Margaret Gotlieb; Jane Lipson
- Writing career
- Notable awards: Prix Aurora Award

Phyllis Fay Gotlieb (née Bloom; May 25, 1926 – July 14, 2009) was a Canadian science fiction novelist and poet.

== Biography ==
Born of Jewish heritage in Toronto, Gotlieb graduated from the University of Toronto with degrees in literature in 1948 (BA) and 1950 (MA).

In 1961, John Robert Colombo's Hawkshead Press published Gotlieb's first collection of poems, the pamphlet Who Knows One Her first novel, the science-fiction tale Sunburst, was published in 1964. Gotlieb won the Prix Aurora Award for Best Novel in 1982 for her novel A Judgement of Dragons. The Sunburst Award is named for her first novel.

Her husband was Calvin Gotlieb (1921–2016), a computer-science professor who lived in Toronto, Ontario.

== Bibliography ==
(Note: Except where noted, bibliographic information courtesy Brock University.)

=== Science fiction novels ===
- Sunburst. New York: Fawcett, 1964.
- Birthstones. Toronto: Robert J. Sawyer Books, 2007.

==== Dahlgren ====
- O Master Caliban! New York: Harper and Row, 1976.
- Heart of Red Iron. New York: St. Martin's Press, 1989.

==== Starcats ====
- A Judgment of Dragons. New York: Berkley Publishers, 1980.
- Emperor, Swords, Pentacles. New York: Ace, 1982.
- The Kingdom of the Cats. New York: Ace, 1985.

==== Flesh and Gold ====
- Flesh and Gold. New York: Tor, 1998.
- Violent Stars. New York: Tor, 1999.
- Mindworld. New York: Tor, 2002.

=== Science fiction collections ===
- Son of the Morning and Other Stories. New York: Ace, 1983.
- Blue Apes. Edmonton: Tesseract Books, 1995.

=== Science fiction anthology ===
- Tesseracts 2 with Douglas Barbour (1987)

=== Novel ===
- Why Should I Have All the Grief? Toronto: Macmillan, 1969.

=== Poetry collections ===
- Who Knows One? Toronto: Hawkshead Press, 1961.
- Within the Zodiac. Toronto: McClelland & Stewart, 1964.
- Ordinary Moving. Toronto: Oxford University Press, 1969.
- Doctor Umlaut's Earthly Kingdom. London, ON: Calliope Press, 1974.
- The Works. London, ON: Calliope Press, 1978.
- Red Blood Black Ink White Paper: New and Selected Poems 1961–2001. Toronto: Exile Editions, 2002. – 2002
- Phyllis Loves Kelly. Toronto: University of Toronto, 2014.
