= Tanya Huff =

Canadian fantasy author (born 1957)

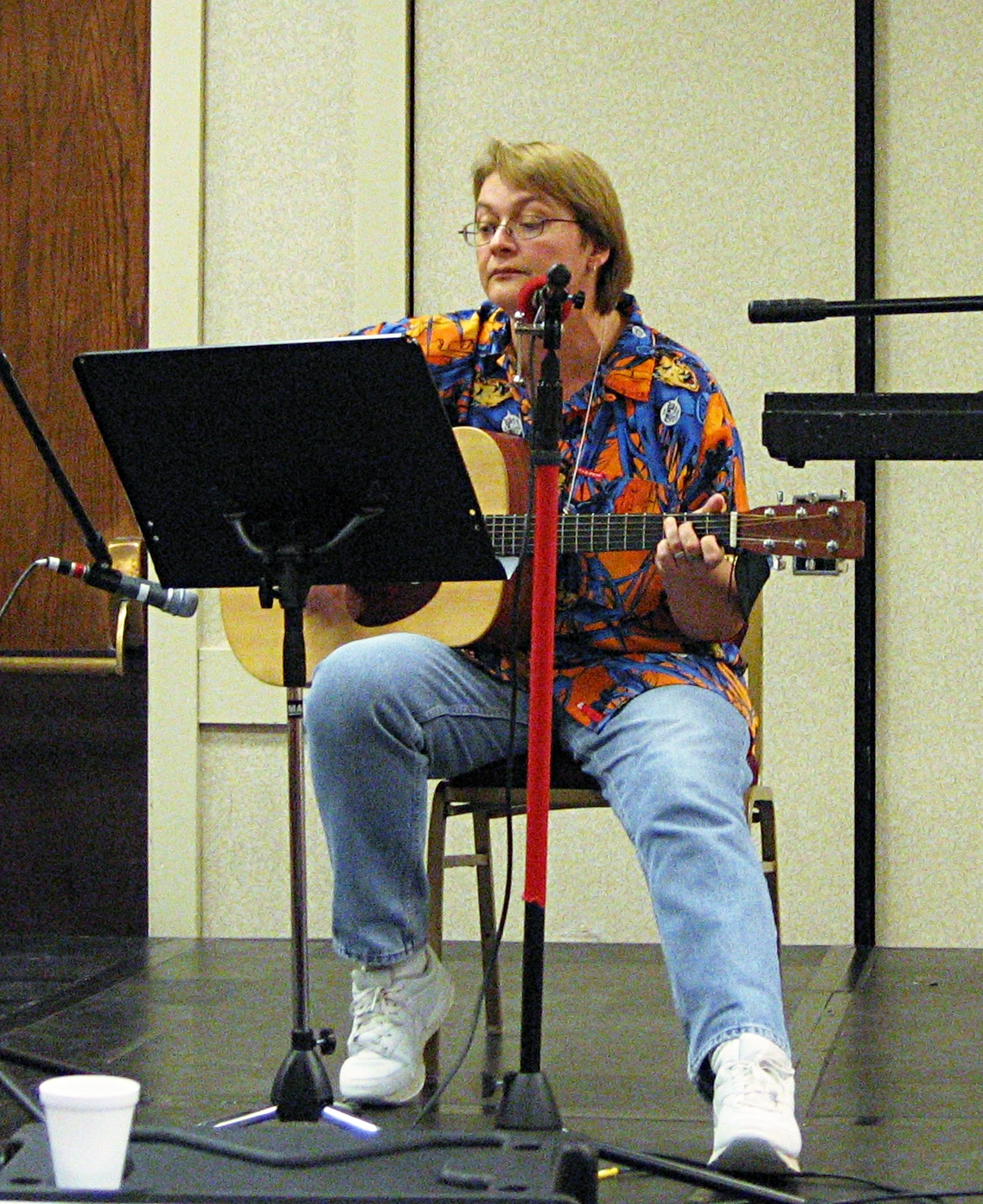
- Tanya Huff at Ohio Valley Filk Fest 2005
- Born: 1957 (age 68–69); Halifax, Nova Scotia, Canada
- Education: Ryerson Polytechnic University
- Occupation: Novelist
- Spouse: Fiona Patton
- Writing career
- Genres: Fantasy, science fiction

Tanya Sue Huff (born 1957) is a Canadian fantasy author. Her stories have been published since the late 1980s, including five fantasy series and one science fiction series. One of these, her Blood Books series, featuring detective Vicki Nelson, was adapted for television under the title Blood Ties.

== Biography ==
Born in Halifax, Nova Scotia, Huff was raised in Kingston, Ontario. Her first sale as a writer was to The Picton Gazette when she was ten. They paid $10 for two of her poems. Huff joined the Canadian Naval Reserve in 1975 as a cook, ending her service in 1979. In 1982, she received a Bachelor of Applied Arts degree in Radio and Television Arts from Ryerson Polytechnical Institute in Toronto, Ontario; she was in the same class as science-fiction writer Robert J. Sawyer and they collaborated on their final TV Studio Lab assignment, a short science-fiction show.

In the early 1980s, she worked at Mr. Gameway's Ark, a game store in Downtown Toronto. From 1984 to 1992, she worked at Bakka, North America's oldest surviving science fiction book store, in Toronto. During this time she wrote seven novels and nine short stories, many of which were subsequently published. Her first professional sale was to George Scithers, the editor of Amazing Stories in 1985, who bought her short story "Third Time Lucky". She was a member of the Bunch of Seven writing group. In 1992, after living for 13 years in downtown Toronto, she moved with her four large cats to rural Ontario, where she currently resides with her wife, fellow fantasy writer Fiona Patton.

Huff is one of the most prominent Canadian authors in the category of contemporary fantasy, a subgenre pioneered by Charles de Lint. Many of the scenes in her stories are near places where she has lived or frequented in Toronto, Kingston, and elsewhere. A prolific author, "she has written everything from horror to romantic fantasy to contemporary fantasy to humour to space opera."

She appeared in a 2009 documentary Pretty Bloody: The Women of Horror.

== Adaptations ==
The CBC Television series Blood Ties was based on Huff's Vicki Nelson novels, and also aired in the United States on Lifetime. It was produced by CHUM Television and Kaleidoscope Entertainment. It was not picked up for a second season (which would have been the third season in the US).
