= Aurora Award for Best Short Fiction =

Literary award category

The Aurora Awards are granted annually by the Canadian SF and Fantasy Association and SFSF Boreal Inc. The Award for Best Short Fiction (French: La meilleure fiction courte) was first recognized in 1986 as a separate category from Best Long-Form and granted as the Award for Best Short-Form (Meilleure nouvelle), one to an English-language work and one to a French-language work, but it did not become a dedicated category until 1989. In 1997 it was renamed to the Award for Best Short-Form Work and then again in 2012 it became the Award for Best Short Story, when the Prix Aurora and Prix Boréal combined, before adopting the name Award for Best Short Fiction a year later.

Robert J. Sawyer holds the highest number of awards for the English-language prize at five (5) awards. Élisabeth Vonarburg and Yves Meynard hold the highest number of awards for the French-language prize, also at five each.

No winner was selected in 1986, but a shortlist was created.

== English-language Award ==
=== Winners and nominees ===
* Winners and joint winners

Year	Author(s)	Work	Collection/Publication	Ref.
1986	No award given			
1986	Rhea Rose	Chronos' Christmas	Tesseracts (Vol. 1)	
1986	David Kilkpatrick	The Effect of Terminal Cancer on Potential Astronauts	Tesseracts (Vol. 1)	
1986	William Gibson	The Winter Market	Vancouver (Nov '85)	
1987	No nominations			
1988	Tanya Huff*	And Who Is Joah?	Amazing Stories, Nov 1987	
1989	Candas Jane Dorsey*	Sleeping in a Box	Machine Sex and Other Stories	
1989	Jo Beverley	The Fruit Picker	Writers of the Future (Vol. IV)	
1989	Robert J. Sawyer	Golden Fleece	Amazing Stories, Sep 1988	
1989	Candas Jane Dorsey	(Learning About) Machine Sex	Machine Sex and Other Stories	
1989	Spider Robinson	The Paranoid	PulpHouse: The Hardback Magazine (#2), Winter 1988	
1990	Eileen Kernaghan*	Carpe Diem	On Spec (Vol 1, No 2), Fall 1989	
1990	Rhea Rose	Duty Free	On Spec (Vol 1, No 2), Fall 1989	
1990	Clélie Rich	A Fertile Mind	On Spec (Vol 1, No 2), Fall 1989	
1990	J. Brian Clarke	Flaw on Serendip	Analog (Nov '89)	
1990	Paula Johanson	If You Go Out in the Woods	On Spec (Vol 1, No 2), Fall 1989	
1991	James Alan Gardner*	Muffin Explains Teleology to the World at Large	On Spec (Vol 2, No 1), Spring 1990	
1991	Andrew Weiner	Eternity, Baby	Asimov's Science Fiction (Nov '90)	
1991	Charles de Lint	The Fair in Emain Matcha	Tor SF Double (#19)	
1991	Charles de Lint	Freewheeling	Unknown	
1991	Mary E. Choo	Wolfrunner	Sword and Sorceress (Vol. VI)	
1992	Michael Skeet*	Breaking Ball	Tesseracts (Vol. 3)	
1992	Peter Watts*	A Niche	Tesseracts (Vol. 3)	
1992	Edo van Belkom	Baseball Memories	Aethlon (Vol. VII, #1)	
1992	S. M. Stirling	The Man Who Would Be Kzin	Man-Kzin Wars (Vol. IV)	
1992	Charles de Lint	Raven Sings a Medicine Way, Coyote Steals the Pollen	Author's Choice Monthly (#22)	
1992	James Alan Gardner	Reaper	F&SF (Feb '91)	
1992	Ursula Pflug	The Water Man	Tesseracts (Vol. 3)	
1992	Hugh Spencer	Why I Hunt Flying Saucers	On Spec (Vol 3, No 2), Winter 1989	
1993	Karl Schroeder* & David Nickle*	The Toy Mill	Tesseracts (Vol. 4)	
1993	Alan Weiss	Arts	Tesseracts (Vol. 4)	
1993	Terence M. Green	Blue Limbo	Ark of Ice: Canadian Futurefiction	
1993	Eileen Kernaghan	Couples	Tesseracts (Vol. 4)	
1993	Nancy Kilpatrick	Farm Wife	Northern Frights (Vol. 1)	
1993	Karl Schroeder	Hopscotch	On Spec (Vol 4, No 1), Spring 1992	
1993	Andrew Weiner	Seeing	F&SF (Sep '92)	
1994	Robert J. Sawyer*	Just Like Old Times	On Spec (Vol 5, No 2), Summer 1993	
1994	Derryl Murphy	Body Solar	On Spec (Vol 5, No 4), Winter 1993	
1994	Erik Jon Spigel	"Kissing Hitler"	On Spec (Vol 5, No 1), Spring 1993	
1994	Michael Coney	"Sophie's Spyglass"	F&SF (Vol 84, No 2), Feb 1993	
1994	D. L. Schaeffer	Three Moral Tales	On Spec (Vol 5, No 1), Spring 1993	
1995	Sally McBride*	The Fragrance of Orchids	Asimov's Science Fiction (May '94)	
1995	Dale L. Sproule	Fourth Person Singular	Northern Frights (Vol. 2)	
1995	Paula Johanson	Small Rain	Prairie Fire (Vol. 15, #2)	
1995	Stephanie Bedwell-Grime	Such Sweet Sorrow	Writer's Block (Summer '94)	
1995	Rebecca M. Senese	Writing Critique	Just Write (May '94)	
1996	Robert Charles Wilson*	The Perseids	Northern Frights (Vol. 3)	
1996	Stephanie Bedwell-Grime	The Dead Go Shopping	Northern Frights (Vol. 3)	
1996	Robert J. Sawyer	Lost in the Mail	TransVersions (#3)	
1996	David Nickle	The Summer Worms	Northern Frights (Vol. 3)	
1996	Michael Coney	Tea and Hamsters	F&SF (Jan '95)	
1997	Robert J. Sawyer*	Peking Man	Dark Destiny (Vol. III)	
1997	Peter Watts	Bethlehem	Tesseracts (Vol. 5)	
1997	Rebecca M. Senese	Face Dances	On Spec (Vol 8, No 2), Summer 1996	
1997	Stephanie Bedwell-Grime	In Your Dreams	Parsec (Apr/May '96)	
1997	Dale L. Sproule	Memory Games	Tesseracts (Vol. 5)	
1997	Edo van Belkom	The Piano Player Has No Fingers	Palace Corbie (Vol. 7)	
1998	James Alan Gardner*	Three Hearings on the Existence of Snakes in the Human Bloodstream	Asimov's Science Fiction (Feb '97)	
1998	Eric Choi	Divisions	Tesseracts (Vol. 6)	
1998	Katie Harse	Fishmonger's Emeralds	Tesseracts (Vol. 6)	
1998	Robert J. Sawyer	The Hand You're Dealt	Free Space	
1998	David Chato	The PlayTime Case	On Spec (Vol 9, No 4), Winter 1997	
1998	Jena Snyder	Prescribed Burn	Tesseracts (Vol. 6)	
1998	Douglas Smith	Spirit Dance	Tesseracts (Vol. 6)	
1998	Eileen Kernaghan	The Watley Man and the Green-Eyed Girl	TransVersions (#7)	
1999	Edo van Belkom*	Hockey's Night in Canada	Arrowdreams: An Anthology of Alternate Canadas	
1999	David Chato	Blind Date	On Spec (#34), Fall 1998	
1999	Cory Doctorow	Craphound	Science Fiction Age, Mar 1998	
1999	Douglas Smith	New Year's Eve	Interzone (#128), Feb 1998	
1999	David Shtogryn	Sunny Fields	Parsec (Spring '98)	
2000	Robert J. Sawyer*	Stream of Consciousness	Packing Fraction & Other Tales of Science & Imagination	
2000	Mark A. Rayner	Any Port in a Storm	Parsec (Spring/Summer '99)	
2000	Gemma Files	The Emperor's Old Bones	Northern Frights (Vol. 5)	
2000	Mark Leslie	Erratic Cycles	Parsec (Winter '98/'99)	
2000	Robert Charles Wilson	Plato's Mirror	Northern Frights (Vol. 5)	
2000	Sally McBride	Speaking Sea	Tesseracts (Vol. 8)	
2000	Douglas Smith	State of Disorder	Amazing Stories, Winter 1999	
2000	Douglas Smith	Symphony	Prairie Fire (Vol. 19, #4)	
2001	Marcie Tentchoff*	Surrendering the Blade	The Doom of Camelot	
2001	Edo van Belkom	Coming of Age	Star Colonies	
2001	Julie E. Czerneda	Down on the Farm	Far Frontiers	
2001	Robert J. Sawyer	The Shoulders of Giants	Star Colonies	
2001	Donna McMahon	Squat	On Spec (#40), Spring 2000	
2002	Julie E. Czerneda*	Left Foot on a Blind Man	Silicon Dreams	
2002	Mark A. Rayner	After the Internet	Western Alumni Gazette (Autumn '01)	
2002	Douglas Smith	By Her Hand, She Draws You Down	The Third Alternative (#28), Fall 2001	
2002	Marcie Tentchoff	The Deed of Snigli	Weird Tales (Summer '01)	
2002	Mary E. Choo	Equations	The Magazine of Speculative Poetry (Spring '01)	
2002	Douglas Smith	The Red Bird	On Spec (#45), Summer 2001	
2002	Robert H. Beer	Waking the Dead	On Spec (#46), Fall 2001	
2003	Robert J. Sawyer*	Ineluctable	Analog (Nov '02)	
2003	Isaac Szpindel	By Its Cover	Explorer: Tales from the Wonder Zone	
2003	Eric Choi	Just Like Being There	Orbiter	
2003	Julie E. Czerneda	Prism	30th Anniversary DAW: Science Fiction	
2003	James Alan Gardner	Rain, Ice, Steam	Explorer: Tales from the Wonder Zone	
2004	Douglas Smith*	Scream Angel	Low Port	
2004	Robert J. Sawyer	Come All Ye Faithful	Space, Inc.	
2004	Isaac Szpindel	Porter's Progress	Space, Inc.	
2004	Derwin Mak	The Siren Stone	Space, Inc.	
2004	Carolyn Clink	Stars	The Stars As Seen from This Particular Angle of Night	
2005	Isaac Szpindel*	When the Morning Stars Sang Together	ReVisions	
2005	Douglas Smith	Enlightenment	Interzone (#194), Sep/Oct 2004	
2005	Karin Lowachee	The Forgotten Ones	So Long Been Dreaming	
2005	Douglas Smith	Jigsaw	Odyssey: Tales From the Wonder Zone	
2005	Hayden Trenholm	The Luck of Willie Lumen	Neo-opsis (#3), 2004	
2005	Robert J. Sawyer	Mikeys	Space Stations	
2005	Nalo Hopkinson	The Smile on the Face	Girls Who Bite Back	
2006	Derwin Mak*	Transubstantiation	Northwest Passages: A Cascadian Anthology	
2006	Karl Schroeder	Alexander's Road (novelette)	The Engine of Recall	
2006	Douglas Smith	Going Harvey in the Big House	Cicada (Jan/Feb '05)	
2006	Robert J. Sawyer	Identity Theft	Down These Dark Spaceways	
2006	Hayden Trenholm	Like Monsters of the Deep	On Spec (#61), Summer 2005	
2006	Peter Watts & Derryl Murphy	Mayfly	Tesseracts (Vol. 9)	
2006	Julie E. Czerneda	She's Such a Nasty Morsel	Women of War	
2007	Robert J. Sawyer*	Biding Time	Slipstreams	
2007	James Alan Gardner	All the Cool Monsters at Once	Mythspring	
2007	Hayden Trenholm	Lumen Essence	Neo-opsis (#9), 2006	
2007	John Mierau	Marked Men	Slipstreams	
2007	Karin Lowachee	This Ink Feels Like Sorrow	Mythspring	
2008	Hayden Trenholm*	Like Water in the Desert	Challenging Destiny (#24)	
2008	Douglas Smith	The Dancer at the Red Door	Under Cover of Darkness	
2008	David Clink	Falling	On Spec (#70), Fall 2007	
2008	Tony Pi	Metamorphosis in Amber	Abyss & Apex (#24, Q4 '07)	
2008	Stephen Kotowych	Saturn in G Minor	Writers of the Future (Vol. XXIII)	
2009	Randy McCharles*	Ringing in the Changes in Okotoks, Alberta	Tesseracts (Vol. 12)	
2009	Peter Atwood	All In	Weird Tales (May/Jun '08)	
2009	Susan Forest	Back	Analog (Jun '08)	
2009	Douglas Smith	A Bouquet of Flowers in a Vase by Van Gogh	Impossibilia	
2009	Douglas Smith	Doorways	Postscripts (#17)	
2010	Eileen Bell*	Pawns Dreaming of Roses (novella)	Women of the Apocalypse	
2010	Brad Carson	Here There Be Monsters	Ages of Wonder	
2010	Ivan Dorin	Little Deaths	Tesseracts (Vol. 13)	
2010	Douglas Smith	Radio Nowhere	Campus Chills	
2010	Robert Wiersema	The World More Full of Weeping	ChiZine Productions	
2011	Hayden Trenholm*	The Burden of Fire	Neo-opsis (#19), 2010	
2011	Suzanne Church	Destiny Lives in the Tattoo's Needle	Tesseracts (Vol. 14)	
2011	Al Onia	The Envoy	Warrior Wisewoman (Vol. 3)	
2011	Matt Moore	Touch the Sky, They Say	AE: The Canadian Science Fiction Review (Nov '10)	
2011	M. G. Gillett	Your Beating Heart	Rigor Amortis	
2012	Suzanne Church*	The Needle's Eye	Chilling Tales: Evil I Did Dwell; Lewid Did I Live	
2012	Marie Bilodeau	The Legend of Gluck	When the Hero Comes Home (Vol. 1)	
2012	Randy McCharles	One Horrible Day	The 2nd Circle	
2012	Derek Künsken	To Live and Die in Gibbontown	Asimov's Science Fiction (Oct/Nov '11)	
2012	Susan Forest	Turning It Off	Analog (Dec '11)	
2013	Douglas Smith*	The Walker of the Shifting Borderland	On Spec (#90), Fall 2012	
2013	Matt Moore	"Δπ (Delta Pi)"	Torn Realities	
2013	Marie Bilodeau	"Happily Ever After"	When the Villain Comes Home	
2013	Al Onia	Knights Exemplar	On Spec (#90), Fall 2012	
2013	Suzanne Church	Synch Me, Kiss Me, Drop	Clarkesworld (#68), May 2012	
2014	Ryan McFadden*	Ghost in the Machine	The Puzzle Box	
2014	Eileen Bell	Angela and Her Three Wishes	The Puzzle Box	
2014	Randy McCharles	The Awakening of Master March	The Puzzle Box	
2014	Mike Rimar	A Bunny Hug for Karl	Masked Mosaic, Canadian Super Stories	
2014	Susan Forest	The Gift	Urban Green Man	
2014	Billie Milholland	Green Man She Restless	Urban Green Man	
2014	Suzanne Church	Living Bargains	When the Hero Comes Home (Vol. 2)	
2015	Eric Choi*	Crimson Sky	Analog (Jul/Aug '14)	
2015	Suzanne Church	Jelly and the D-Machine	Elements: A Collection of Speculative Fiction	
2015	Derwin Mak	Mecha-Jesus	Tesseracts (Vol. 18)	
2015	Tony Pi	No Sweeter Art	Beneath Ceaseless Skies (#155), Sep 2014	
2015	Suzanne Church	Soul-Hungry	Elements: A Collection of Speculative Fiction	
2016	Kelly Robson*	Waters of Versailles	Tor.com	
2016	Costi Gurgu & Tony Pi	"Cosmobotica"	The Mammoth Book of Dieselpunk	
2016	Ron Friedman	"Game Not Over"	Galaxy's Edge (#12), Jan 2015	
2016	Charlotte Ashley	'"La Héron"	F&SF (Vol 128, No 3&4), Mar/Apr 2015	
2016	Robert J. Sawyer	Looking for Gordo	Future Visions: Original Science Fiction Inspired by Microsoft	
2016	Stephen Kotowych	Super Frenemies	Caped: An Anthology of Superhero Tales	
2017	Hayden Trenholm*	Marion's War	Strangers Among Us	
2017	Robert Runté	Age of Miracles	Strangers Among Us	
2017	Erika Holt	Frog Song	Strangers Among Us	
2017	Bev Geddes	Living in Oz	Strangers Among Us	
2017	Amal El-Mohtar	"Seasons of Glass and Iron"	The Starlit Wood: New Fairy Tales	
2017	Ace Jordyn	When Phakack Comes to Steal Papa, a Ti-Jean Story	On Spec (#103), Sep 2016	
2018	Liz Westbrook-Trenholm*	Gone Flying	The Sum of Us: Tales of the Bonded and Bound	
2018	Elizabeth Grotowski	The Calling	Enigma Front: The Monster Within	
2018	Kelly Robson	A Human Stain	Tor.com	
2018	Fonda Lee	Old Souls	When the Stars Rise: Asian Science Fiction and Fantasy	
2018	Calvin D. Jim	Rose's Arm	When the Stars Rise: Asian Science Fiction and Fantasy	
2019	Kelly Robson*	Gods, Monsters, and the Lucky Peach	Tor.com	
2019	Julie E. Czerneda	A Hold Full of Truffles	Tales From Plexis	
2019	Kate Heartfield	Alice Payne Arrives	Tor.com	
2019	Liz Westbrook-Trenholm	Critical Mass	Shades Within Us: Tales of Migrations and Fractured Borders	
2019	Susan Forest	For a Rich Man to Enter	InterGalactic Medicine Show (#62)	
2020	Amal El-Mohtar & Max Gladstone*	This Is How You Lose the Time War (chapbook)	Saga Press	
2020	Kate Heartfield	Alice Payne Rides (chapbook)	Tor.com	
2020	Liz Westbrook-Trenholm	"Blindside"	Amazing Stories, Fall 2019	
2020	Maria Haskins	"Clear as Quartz, Sharp as Flint"	Augur (#2.1)	
2020	Y. M. Pang	"Little Inn on the Jianghu"	F&SF, Sep/Oct 2019	
2020	Hayden Trenholm	"Modigliani Paints the World"	Neo-opsis (#30), 2019	
2021	Chadwick Ginther*	"All Cats Go to Valhalla"	Swashbuckling Cats	
2021	KT Bryski	"The Bone-Stag Walks"	Lightspeed (#123), Aug 2020	
2021	Calvin D. Jim	"Breathe"	Prairie Gothic	
2021	Elizabeth Whitton	"Grass Gods"	Prairie Gothic	
2021	Barb Galler-Smith	"Night Folk"	Galaxy's Edge (#47), Nov 2020	
2021	Kelly Robson	"So You Want to Be a Honeypot"	Uncanny (#39), Mar/Apr 2020	
2022	Phoebe Barton*	"The Mathematics of Fairyland"	Lightspeed (#130), Mar 2021	
2022	C. J. Cheung	"Clear Waters"	Seasons Between Us: Tales of Identities and Memories	
2022	Rati Mehrotra	"Eighteen Days of Barbareek"	Uncanny (#45), Mar/Apr 2021	
2022	Elizabeth Whitton	"Elesa's Eyes"	On Spec (#117), Sep 2021	
2022	Susan Forest	"The Only Road"	Shapers of Worlds: Volume II	
2022	Eric Choi	"Second Thoughts"	Seasons Between Us: Tales of Identities and Memories	
2023	Peter G. Reynolds*	"Broken Vow: The Adventures of Flick Gibson, Intergalactic Videographer"	On Spec (#120)	
2023	Hayden Trenholm	"Big Trouble in Droidtown"	The Astronaut Always Rings Twice	
2023	Suzan Palumbo	"Douen"	The Dark, Mar 2022	
2023	Geoffrey W. Cole	"The Five Rules of Supernova Surfing, or A for Real Solution to the Fermi Paradox, Bro"	Clarkesworld, Jan 2022	
2023	Elizabeth Whitton	"Green Witch"	Prairie Witch	
2023	Eric Choi	"A New Brave World"	Brave New Worlds	
2023	Wayne Cusack	"Schrödinger's Cats"	Polar Borealis 22	
2023	Gillian Secord	"We Are the Thing That Lives on the Moon"	Fireside, Mar 2022	
2024	Premee Mohamed*	"At Every Door a Ghost"	Communications Breakdown Mar 2023	
2024	Justin Dill	"The Dust Bowl Café"	Augur Jun 2023	
2024	Douglas Smith	"If I Should Fall Behind"	F&SF Sep/Oct 2023	
2024	P. A. Cornell	"Once Upon a Time at The Oakmont"	Fantasy Magazine Oct 2023	
2024	Chandra Fisher	"Sink Your Sorrows to the Sea"	Saltwater Sorrows	
2025	Y. M. Pang	"Blood and Desert Dreams"	Beneath Ceaseless Skies, Issue 408	
2025	R H Wesley	"A World of Milk and Promises"	Clarkesworld, Issue 216	
2025	Kerry C. Byrne	"And When She Shatters"	Heartlines Spec, Issue 4	
2025	Gillian Secord	"BUDDY RAYMOND’S NO-BULLSHIT GUIDE TO DRONE HUNTING"	Diabolical Plots, #108A	
2025	Geoffrey W. Cole	"Desolation Sounds"	Zebra Meridian and Other Stories, Stelliform Press	
2026	R.H. Wesley	"The Stone Played at Tengen"	Clarkesworld Magazine, Issue 230	
2026	Premee Mohamed	"Hunted To Extinction"	Gallery Books	
2026	Jacqueline Thorpe	"I Ain’t Your Doll Face"	Polar Borealis Magazine #33	
2026	Gillian Secord	"the love song of house and lake"	On Spec Magazine, Issue #133	
2026	Rachel A. Rosen	"What If We Kissed While Sinking a Billionaire’s Yacht?"	Antifa Lit Journal, Volume 1	

== French-language Award ==
=== Winners and nominees ===
* Winners and joint winners

Year	Author(s)	Work	Collection/Publication	Ref.
1986	Daniel Sernine*	Yadjine et la mort (Yadjine and Death)	Dix nouvelles de science-fiction québécoise	
1987	Élisabeth Vonarburg*	La Carte du Tendre (Map of the Tender)	Montréal (#15)	
1988	Alain Bergeron*	Les Crabes de Vénus regardent le ciel (Venus Crabs Look to the Sky)	Solaris (#73, May/Jun '87)	
1989	Joël Champetier*	Survie sur Mars (Survival on Mars)	L'Année de la Science-Fiction et du Fantastique Québécois - 1987	
1990	Élisabeth Vonarburg*	Cogito	Imagine... (#46, Dec '88)	
1991	Élisabeth Vonarburg*	Ici, des tigres (Here, Tigers)	Octa (#48)	
1992	Yves Meynard*	L'Enfant des Mondes Assoupis (Child of the Slumbering Worlds)	Sol (#11)	
1993	Jean Dion*	Base de negotiation (Negotiation Base)	Solaris (#101, Aug '92)	
1994	Yves Meynard*	La Merveilleuse machine de Johann Havel (The Wonderful Machine of Johann Havel)	Solaris (#107, Oct '93)	
1995	Alain Bergeron*	L'Homme qui fouillait la lumière (Man Who Searched the Light)	Solaris (#111, Autumn '94)	
1995	Yves Meynard*	L'Envoyé (The Envoy)	Imagine... (April '94)	
1996	Yves Meynard*	Équinoxe (Equinox)	Unknown	
1997	Jean-Louis Trudel*	Lamente-toi, sagesse ! (Lament, Wisdom!)	Genèses (#4279)	
1998	Yves Meynard*	Une lettre de ma mere (A Letter From my Mother)	Solaris (#121, Spring '97)	
1999	Guy Sirois*	La Demoiselle sous la lune (The Lady Under the Moon)	Fantasy (#1, Nov '98)	
2000	Éric Gauthier*	Souvenirs du Saudade Express (Memories of the Saudade Express)	Solaris (#131, Autumn '99)	
2001	Douglas Smith* & Benoît Domis*	Spirit Dance (La Danse des esprits)	Tesseracts (Vol. 6)	
2002	Daniel Sernine*	Souvenirs de lumière (Memories of Light)	Solaris (#138, Autumn '01)	
2003	Sylvie Bérard*	La Guerre sans temps (War Without Time)	Solaris (#143, Autumn '02)	
2004	Élisabeth Vonarburg*	La Course de Kathryn (Kathryn's Race)	Recueils (#70, Sep-Dec '03)	
2005	Michèle Laframboise*	Ceux qui ne comptent pas (Those Who Don't Count)	Solaris (#149, Spring '04)	
2006	Alain Ducharme*	Montréal: trois uchronies (Montréal: Three Alternate Histories)	Solaris (#155, Summer '05)	
2007	Mario Tessier*	Le Regard du trilobite (The Trilobite Look)	Solaris (#159, Summer '06)	
2008	Laurent McAllister*	Sur la plage des épaves (On the Beach of the Wrecks)	Solaris (#164, Autumn '07)	
2009	Jean-Louis Trudel*	Le Dôme de Saint-Macaire (The Dome of Saint-Macaire)	Solaris (#167, Summer '08)	
2009	Michèle Laframboise	Ballade sur Pallide	Virages #44	
2009	Alain Ducharme	Jos Montferrand et le Grand Brigand des routes	Solaris #161	
2009	Michèle Laframboise	La révolte des gilets-malins	QUAD9 #6A	
2010	Alain Bergeron*	Ors blancs (White Gold)	Solaris (#171, Summer '09)	
2011	Philippe-Aubert Côté*	Pour l'honneur d'un Nohaum (For the Honour of a Nohaum)	Solaris (#176, Autumn '10)	
2012	Ariane Gélinas*	L'Enfant sans visage (The Faceless Child)	Unknown	
2013	Geneviève Blouin*	Le Chasseur (The Hunter)	Unknown	
2014	Jonathan Reynolds*	La légende de McNeil (The Legend of McNeil)	Les Six Brumes	
2014	Dave Côté	Vortex	Solaris (#188, Autumn '13)	
2014	Yves Meynard	Les Mystères d'Innsmouth (The Mysteries of Innsmouth)	Solaris (#186, Spring '13)	
2015	Joël Champetier*	Pour son oeil seulement (For His Eyes Only)	Solaris (#192, Autumn '14)	
2015	Alain Bergeron	Les Pèlerins de Calcibur (The Pilgrims of Calcibur)	Solaris (#190, Spring '14)	
2015	Geneviève Blouin	Le Voleur de dieu (The Thief of God)	Brins d'éternité (#38, May '14)	
2015	Geneviève Blouin	Sentence incarnée (Embodied Sentence)	Solaris (#192, Autumn '14)	
2015	Éric Gauthier	La Langue du voisin (The Neighbour's Language)	Solaris (#190, Spring '14)	
2015	Pierre-Luc Lafrance	Le Lendemain, les journaux parleront de folie collective (Tomorrow, The Newspaper's Will Talk About Collective Madness)	Brins d'éternité (#37, Mar '14)	
2016	Jean-Louis Trudel*	Garder un phénix en cage (Keeping a Phoenix in a Cage)	Solaris (#195, Summer '15)	
2016	Geneviève Blouin	L'Enchanteresse portait des Lévi's (The Enchantress Wore Levis)	Solaris (#195, Summer '15)	
2016	Élise Lucie Hendripin	Baptême (Baptism)	Clair/Obscure (Vol. 13)	
2016	Pierre-Luc Lafrance	Dans ses pas (In Its Steps)	L'Arracheur de rêves	
2016	Guillaume Voisine	Le Contraste de l'éternité (The Contrast of Eternity)	Bizarro	
2017	Élisabeth Vonarburg*	Le printemps de Krijka (Krijka's Spring)	Solaris (#200, Autumn '16)	
2017	Raphaëlle B. Adam	La maison verte (The Green House)	Solaris (#197, Winter '16)	
2017	Dave Côté	Angle mort (Blindspot)	Brins d’éternité (#43)	
2017	Éric Gauthier	Éclairer l’origine (Illuminate the Origin)	Solaris (#199, Summer '16)	
2017	Michèle Laframboise	La Cousine entropie (Entropy Cousin)	Galaxie (#40)	
2017	Isabelle Lauzon	Consortium: L’initiation (Consortium: The Initiation)	Solaris (#197, Winter '16)	
2017	Yves Meynard	Le guerrier aveugle (The Blind Warrior)	Solaris (#200, Autumn '16)	
2017	Éric Simard	Je ne suis pas mort (I'm Not Dead)	Clair/Obscur (#17)	
2017	Mario Tessier	Le sommeil de la raison (The Sleep of Reason)	Brins d’éternité (#43)	
2017	Mario Tessier	Tempus fugit (Tempus Ran)	Solaris (#198, Spring '16)	
2018	Philippe-Aubert Côté*	La nuit aux trois demons (Night of the Three Demons)	Les Six Brumes	
2018	Geneviève Blouin	Démonthérapie (Demon Therapy)	Solaris (#203)	
2018	Luc Dagenais	XXZ: une histoire de sexe oral au temps des zombies (XXZ: An Oral Sex Story n the Age of Zombies)	Les Six Brumes	
2018	Michèle Laframboise	Petzis	Solaris (#203)	
2018	Vic Verdier	Lac au Sable (Sand Lake)	Les Six Brumes	
2019	Luc Dagenais*	La déferlante des Mères (Surge of Mothers)	Solaris (#207)	
2019	Raphaëlle B. Adam	La femme qui soupirait (The Women who sighed	Brins d'éternité (#49)	
2019	Geneviève Blouin	L’épée et le templier (The sword and the templar)	La République du centaure	
2019	Geneviève Blouin	La gang du cimetière (The Cemetery's Gang)	Brins d’éternité (#50)	
2019	Guillaume Voisine	Le hurlement des possibles (The Howling of Possibles)	Brins d’éternité (#50)	
2020	Geneviève Blouin*	Oikos cherche cuisinière (Oikos Needs Cook)	Solaris (#210)	
2021	Pascal Raud*	La mémoire du papillon (The Butterfly's memory)	Solaris (#214)	
2022	Geneviève Blouin*	L’épée et la relique (The sword and the relic)	La République du Centaure	
2024	Isabelle Piette*	Ce qu’on laisse derrière	Solaris	
2024	Ariane Gélinas	Floraisons	XYZ	
2024	Stanley Péan	Blanche comme la nuit	Mains libres	
2024	Jonathan Reynolds	Capitaine Bâbord et la sirène	Solaris	
2024	Marie-Jeanne Rioux	Anastasia	Édiligne	
2025	Ariane Gélinas*	Bercer les voûtes	Les Six Brumes	
2025	July Cyr	IA	Échos de l’imaginaire	
2025	Bruno Mercille	La dette	Échos de l’imaginaire	
2025	Marie-Pier Rabouin	Magie et Illusion	Échos de l’imaginaire	
2025	Gin Zenemig	Crépuscule écarlate	Cœurs des ténèbres	
