= List of Canadian science fiction and fantasy authors =

This is a list of science fiction and fantasy authors who were born in Canada or spent a significant portion of their writing career living in Canada.

== A-G ==
- David Annandale
- Kelley Armstrong
- Madeline Ashby
- Margaret Atwood
- Malcolm Azania
- Alison Baird
- R. Scott Bakker
- Stephanie Bedwell-Grime
- Erin Bow
- Paul Chafe
- Joël Champetier
- Michael G. Coney
- Seán Cummings
- Julie E. Czerneda
- Charles de Lint
- A. M. Dellamonica
- Arinn Dembo
- David Demchuk
- James De Mille
- Gordon R. Dickson
- Candas Jane Dorsey
- Cory Doctorow
- Wayland Drew
- Dave Duncan
- Amal El-Mohtar
- Steven Erikson
- Nigel Findley
- J.M. Frey
- Barb Galler-Smith
- James Alan Gardner
- Pauline Gedge
- Terence M. Green
- Ed Greenwood
- William Gibson
- Phyllis Gotlieb
- Hiromi Goto

== H-P ==
- PJ Haarsma
- J. C. Hall
- H. A. Hargreaves
- Rachel Hartman
- Kate Heartfield
- Nalo Hopkinson
- Tanya Huff
- Matt Hughes
- Monica Hughes
- Tina Hunter
- Marie Jakober
- Ai Jiang
- K.V. Johansen
- Karl Johanson
- Jessica Johns
- Daniel Heath Justice
- Guy Gavriel Kay
- Eileen Kernaghan
- Crawford Kilian
- Nancy Kilpatrick
- Donald Kingsbury
- W. H. C. Lawrence
- Fonda Lee
- Mark Leslie
- Karin Lowachee
- Nicole Luiken
- Maggie MacDonald
- Scott Mackay
- Nathalie Mallet
- Emily St. John Mandel
- Paul Marlowe
- Suzanne Martel
- Yves Meynard
- Premee Mohamed
- Moira J. Moore
- Silvia Moreno-Garcia
- Jim Munroe
- Nina Munteanu
- Francine Pelletier
- Fiona Patton
- C. L. Polk

== R-Z ==
- Mark A. Rayner
- Vincent Reid
- Waubgeshig Rice
- Spider Robinson
- Kelly Robson
- Joel Rosenberg
- Michael Rowe
- Sean Russell
- Geoff Ryman
- Michelle Sagara
- Liselle Sambury
- Lynsay Sands
- Charles R. Saunders
- Robert J. Sawyer
- Karl Schroeder
- Daniel Sernine
- William Shatner
- Alison Sinclair
- Lisa Smedman
- Linda Smith
- Caro Soles
- Steve Stanton
- S.M. Stirling
- Karina Sumner-Smith
- Caitlin Sweet
- Kenneth Tam
- Dennis E. Taylor
- Jean-Louis Trudel
- Edo van Belkom
- Elisabeth Vonarburg
- A. E. van Vogt
- Mark Waddell
- Jo Walton
- Peter Watts
- Andrew Weiner
- Edward Willett
- Lynda Williams
- Robert Charles Wilson
- Evan Winter
- Tim Wynne-Jones
- Alexander Zelenyj

== See also ==
- Lists of Canadian writers
