= Aurora Award for Best Related Work =

Literary award category

The Aurora Awards are granted annually by the Canadian SF and Fantasy Association and SFSF Boreal Inc. The Award for Best Related Work (French: Autre oeuvre), was first recognized in 1983 as a separate category from Best Long-Form and was first granted in 1989 as the Award for Best Other Work (French: Réalisation autre) one granted to an English-language work and one to a French-language work. In 1999 it changed its name to Best Work (Other), and when the Prix Aurora and Prix Boreal combined, the awards adopted the name Best Related Work in 2012.

In 1983, two non-fiction works were recognized separately from other works, but neither were given an award. The French Award was not granted several times in 2003, 2005 and 2008 as there were insufficient entries.

On Spec has won the English award the most number of times at 7 awards, and Solaris has won the French award the most number of times at 21 awards.

== English-language Award ==
=== Winners and nominees ===
* Winners and joint winners

Year	Editor/Creator(s)	Work	Category	Publisher/Publication	Ref.
1983	John Bell	Uneasy Union: A Checklist of English Language SF Concerning Canadian Separatist Conflicts	Non-fiction	Unknown	
1983	John Robert Colombo	Years of Light: A Celebration of Leslie A. Croutch	Non-fiction	Unknown	
1989	Gary Truscott*	Tesseract Books	Publisher	Tesseract	
1990	Copper Pig Writers' Society*	On Spec	Magazine	Copper Pig Writers' Society	
1991	Copper Pig Writers' Society*	On Spec	Magazine	Copper Pig Writers' Society	
1992	TVOntario*	Prisoners of Gravity	TV show	TVOntario	
1993	Michael Skeet* & Lorna Toolies*	Tesseracts (Vol. 4)	Anthology	Tesseract	
1994	TVOntario*	Prisoners of Gravity	TV show	TVOntario	
1994	Derryl Murphy	Book Reviews	Journalism	Edmonton Journal	
1994	Edo van Belkom	Market Reports	Journalism	SFWA Bulletin & Communiqué	
1994	Al Betz	Ask Mr. Science	Journalism	On Spec	
1994	Eileen Kernaghan	N/A	Poem	Unknown	
1994	Copper Pig Writers' Society	On Spec	Magazine	Copper Pig Writers' Society	
1995	Copper Pig Writers' Society*	On Spec	Magazine	Copper Pig Writers' Society	
1995	Don Hutchison	Northern Frights (Vol. 2)	Anthology	Mosaic	
1995	David G. Hartwell & Glenn Grant	Northern Stars	Anthology	Tor	
1995	Candas Jane Dorsey	Prairie Fire	Magazine	Prairie Fire	
1995	TVOntario	Prisoners of Gravity	TV show	TVOntario	
1996	BLT Productions*	ReBoot	TV show	BLT Productions	
1996	Don Hutchison	Northern Frights (Vol. 3)	Anthology	Mosaic	
1996	On Spec Editorial Collective	On Spec: The First Five Years	Anthology	Tesseract	
1996	Hugh Spencer & Alan Weiss	Destination, Out of This World	Exhibit	Library and Archives Canada	
1996	Island Specialty Resorts	TransVersions	Magazine	Island Specialty Reports	
1997	Copper Pig Writers' Society*	On Spec	Magazine	Copper Pig Writers' Society	
1997	Don Hutchison	The Great Pulp Heroes	Anthology	Mosaic	
1997	Parsec Publishing Co.	Parsec	Magazine	Parsec	
1997	Yves Meynard & Robert Runté	Tesseracts (Vol. 5)	Anthology	Tesseract	
1997	Island Specialty Resorts	TransVersions	Magazine	Island Specialty Reports	
1998	Don Hutchison*	Northern Frights (Vol. 4)	Anthology	Mosaic	
1998	Alliance Atlantis, Tribune & Roddenberry-Kirschner	Earth: Final Conflict (season 1, episode 12: "Sandoval's Run")	TV show	CTV	
1998	Copper Pig Writers' Society	On Spec	Magazine	Copper Pig Writers' Society	
1998	Parsec Publishing Co.	Parsec	Magazine	Parsec	
1998	Mainframe Entertainment	ReBoot (season 3, episode 3: "Firewall")	TV show	YTV	
1998	Robert J. Sawyer & Carolyn Clink	Tesseracts (Vol. 6)	Anthology	Tesseract	
1998	Island Specialty Resorts	TransVersions	Magazine	Island Specialty Reports	
1999	Mark Shainblum* & John Dupuis*	Arrowdreams: An Anthology of Alternate Canadas	Anthology	Nuage	
1999	Al Betz	Ask Mr. Science	Journalism	On Spec	
1999	Susan MacGregor	Divine Realms	Anthology	Ravenstone	
1999	Edo van Belkom	Northern Dreamers: Interviews with Famous Science Fiction, Fantasy, and Horror Writers	Non-fiction	Quarry	
1999	Jena Snyder	On Spec	Magazine	Copper Pig Writers' Society	
1999	Chris Krejlgaard	Parsec	Magazine	Parsec	
1999	Sally McBride & Dale L. Sproule	TransVersions	Magazine	Island Specialty Records	
2000	Don Hutchison*	Northern Frights (Vol. 5)	Anthology	Mosaic	
2000	Edo van Belkom	Aurora Awards	Awards	Quarry	
2000	Jena Snyder	On Spec	Magazine	Copper Pig Writers' Society	
2000	Chris Krejlgaard	Parsec Publishing Co.	Publisher	Parsec	
2000	Dale L. Sproule	TransVersions	Magazine	Island Specialty Records	
2001	David Widdicombe*	Science Fiction: The Play	Play	David Widdicombe	
2001	Edo van Belkom	Be Afraid!	Anthology	Tundra	
2001	Edo van Belkom	Northern Horror	Anthology	Quarry	
2001	Jena Snyder	On Spec	Magazine	Copper Pig Writers' Society	
2001	Edo van Belkom	Writing Horror	Non-fiction	Self-Counsel	
2002	Isaac Szpindel*	Rescue Heroes (season 2 Episode 4: "Underwater Nightmare")	Screenplay	Nelvana	
2002	Charles de Lint	Books to Look For	Journalism	F&SF	
2002	Nancy Kilpatrick	World Fantasy Convention 2001	Convention	World Fantasy Convention	
2002	Bruce Ballon	Call of Cthulhu: Unseen Masters	Role-playing Game	Chaosium	
2002	Copper Pig Writers' Society	On Spec	Magazine	Copper Pig Writers' Society	
2002	Don Hutchison	Wild Things Live There: The Best of Northern Frights	Anthology	Mosaic	
2003	Edo van Belkom*	Be VERY Afraid!	Anthology	Tundra	
2003	Julie E. Czerneda	Explorer: Tales from the Wonder Zone	Anthology	Trifolium	
2003	Robert J. Sawyer, Joe Mahoney & Barbara Worthy	Faster than Light	Radio	CBC Radio	
2003	Isaac Szpindel	Rescue Heroes (season 3 Episode 7: "Bat's Life")	Screenplay	Nelvana	
2003	Julie E. Czerneda	Stardust: Tales from the Wonder Zone	Anthology	Trifolium	
2004	Julie E. Czerneda*	Space, Inc.	Anthology	DAW	
2004	Robert J. Sawyer	Merril Collection	Collection	Toronto Public Library	
2004	Bruce Ballon	From the Files of Matthews Gentech	Role-playing Game	Guardians of Order	
2004	Heather Dale	May Queen	Music	Unknown	
2004	Karl Johanson	Neo-opsis	Magazine	Magazines Canada	
2004	Sandra Kasturi	The Stars As Seen from this Particular Angle of Night	Anthology	Red Deer	
2005	Robert J. Sawyer*	Relativity: Essays and Stories	Non-fiction	ISFiC	
2005	Karl Johanson	Neo-opsis	Magazine	Magazines Canada	
2005	Julie E. Czerneda	Odyssey: Tales From the Wonder Zone	Anthology	Trifolium	
2005	Julie E. Czerneda & Isaac Szpindel	ReVisions	Anthology	DAW	
2005	Nalo Hopkinson & Uppinder Mehan	So Long Been Dreaming	Anthology	Arsenal Pulp	
2006	Nalo Hopkinson* & Geoff Ryman*	Tesseracts (Vol. 9)	Anthology	Edge	
2006	Robert J. Sawyer, Michael Lennick & Joe Mahoney	Birth	Radio	CBC Radio One	
2006	Julie E. Czerneda	Fantastic Companions	Anthology	Fitzhenry & Whiteside	
2006	Karl Johanson	Neo-opsis	Magazine	Magazines Canada	
2006	Diane Walton	On Spec	Magazine	Copper Pig Writers' Society	
2006	Nalo Hopkinson & Joe Mahoney	Six Impossible Things	Radio	CBC Radio One	
2007	Karl Johanson*	Neo-opsis	Magazine	Magazines Canada	
2007	Heather Dale	The Hidden Path	Music	Unknown	
2007	Martin Springett	Jousting with Jesters: An ABC for the Younger Dragon	Picture Book	Orca	
2007	Julie E. Czerneda & Genevieve Kierans	Mythspring	Anthology	Red Deer	
2007	Robert Charles Wilson & Edo van Belkom	Tesseracts (Vol. 10)	Anthology	Edge	
2008	Julie E. Czerneda* & Jana Paniccia*	Under Cover of Darkness	Anthology	DAW	
2008	Karl Johanson	Neo-opsis	Magazine	Magazines Canada	
2008	Diane Walton	On Spec	Magazine	Copper Pig Writers' Society	
2008	Julie E. Czerneda	Polaris: A Celebration of Polar Science	Anthology	Star Ink	
2008	Cory Doctorow & Holly Phillips	Tesseracts (Vol. 11)	Anthology	Edge	
2009	Karl Johanson*	Neo-opsis	Magazine	Magazines Canada	
2009	J. R. Campbell & Charles Prepolec	Gaslight Grimoire: Dark Tales of Sherlock Holmes	Anthology	Edge	
2009	Diane Walton	On Spec	Magazine	Copper Pig Writers' Society	
2009	Claude Lalumière	Tesseracts (Vol. 12)	Anthology	Edge	
2009	Marcie Lynn Tentchoff	Through the Window: a Journey to the Borderlands of Faerie	Anthology	Edge	
2010	Eileen Bell*, Roxanne Felix*, Billie Milholland* & Ryan McFadden*	Women of the Apocalypse	Anthology	Absolute XPress	
2010	Julie E. Czerneda & Robert St. Martin	Ages of Wonder	Anthology	DAW	
2010	Robert J. Sawyer	Distant Early Warnings: Canada's Best Science Fiction	Anthology	Robert J. Sawyer	
2010	Karl Johanson	Neo-opsis	Magazine	Magazines Canada	
2010	Diane Walton	On Spec	Magazine	Copper Pig Writers' Society	
2011	Derwin Mak* & Eric Choi*	The Dragon and the Stars	Anthology	DAW	
2011	Douglas Smith	Chimerascope	Anthology	ChiZine	
2011	Nancy Kilpatrick	Evolve: Vampire Stories of the New Undead	Anthology	Edge	
2011	Diane Walton	On Spec	Magazine	Copper Pig Writers' Society	
2011	John Robert Colombo & Brett Alexander Savory	Tesseracts (Vol. 14)	Anthology	Edge	
2012	Diane Walton*	On Spec	Magazine	Copper Pig Writers' Society	
2012	Heather Dale	Fairytale	Music	heatherdale.com	
2012	Eileen Bell & Ryan McFadden	Tenth Circle Project (Vol. 1)	Anthology	the10thcircle.com	
2012	Karl Johanson	Neo-opsis	Magazine	Magazines Canada	
2012	Julie E. Czerneda & Susan MacGregor	Tesseracts (Vol. 15)	Anthology	Edge	
2013	Hayden Trenholm*	Blood and Water	Anthology	Bundoran	
2013	Helen Marshall	Hair Side, Flesh Side	Anthology	ChiZine	
2013	Sandra Katsuri & Halli Villegas	Imaginarium 2012: The Best Canadian Speculative Writing	Anthology	ChiZine	
2013	Diane Walton	On Spec	Magazine	Copper Pig Writers' Society	
2013	Ace Jordyn, Calvin D. Jim & Reneé Bennett	Shanghai Stream	Anthology	Edge	
2014	Diane Walton*	On Spec	Magazine	Copper Pig Writers' Society	
2014	Samantha Beiko & Sandra Katsuri	Imaginarium 2013: The Best Canadian Speculative Writing	Anthology	ChiZine	
2014	Eileen Bell, Roxanne Felix, Billie Milholland & Ryan McFadden	The Puzzle Box	Anthology	Edge	
2014	Susan MacGregor	Suzenyms	Anthology	suzenyms.blogspot.ca	
2014	Janice Blaine & Adria Laycraft	Urban Green Man	Anthology	Edge	
2015	Diane Walton*	On Spec	Magazine	Copper Pig Writers' Society	
2015	Suzanne Church	Elements: A Collection of Speculative Fiction	Anthology	Edge	
2015	Helen Marshall	Gifts for the One Who Comes After	Anthology	ChiZine	
2015	Ranylt Richildis	Lackington's	Anthology	lackingtons.com	
2015	Hayden Trendholm	Strange Bedfellows	Anthology	Bundoran	
2016	Hayden Trenholm* & Michael Rimar*	Second Contacts	Anthology	Bundoran	
2016	Madeline Ashby & David Nickle	Licence Expired: The Unauthorized James Bond	Anthology	ChiZine	
2016	Nancy Kilpatrick & Caro Soles	nEvermore! Tales of Murder, Mystery & the Macabre	Anthology	Edge	
2016	Colleen Anderson & Ursula Pflug	Playground of Lost Toys	Anthology	Exile	
2016	J. R. Campbell & Charles Prepolec	Professor Challenger: New Worlds, Lost Places	Anthology	Edge	
2017	Susan Forest* & Lucas K. Law*	Strangers Among Us: Tales of the Underdogs and Outcasts	Anthology	Laksa	
2017	Dominik Parisien	Clockwork Canada	Anthology	Exile	
2017	Celeste A. Peters	Enigma Front: Burnt	Anthology	Analemma	
2017	Hayden Trendholm & Mike Rimar	Lazarus Risen	Anthology	Bundoran	
2017	Claude Lalumière & Mark Shainblum	Tesseracts (Vol. 19)	Anthology	Edge	
2018	Susan Forest* & Lucas K. Law*	The Sum of Us: Tales of the Bonded and Bound	Anthology	Laksa	
2018	Hayden Trenholm	49th Parallels	Anthology	Bundoran	
2018	Renée Bennett	Enigma Front: The Monster Within	Anthology	Analemma	
2018	Copper Pig Writers' Society	On Spec	Magazine	Copper Pig Writers' Society	
2018	Spider Robinson & James Alan Gardner	Tesseracts (Vol. 20)	Anthology	Edge	
2018	Lucas K. Law & Derwin Mak	Where the Stars Rise: Asian Science Fiction and Fantasy	Anthology	Laksa	
2019	Dominik Parisien* & Elsa Sjunneson-Henry*	Disabled People Destroy Science Fiction	Magazine	Uncanny	
2019	Shannon Allen & J. R. Campbell	By the Light of Camelot	Anthology	Edge	
2019	Susan Forest & Lucas K. Law	Shades Within Us: Tales of Migrations and Fractured Borders	Anthology	Laksa Media	
2019	Derek Newman-Stille	We Shall Be Monsters: Mary Shelley's Frankenstein 200 years on	Anthology	Renaissance	
2020	Diane Walton*	On Spec	Magazine	Copper Pig Writers' Society	
2020	Kerrie Seljak-Byrne	Augur (#2.1, #2.2, #2.3)	Magazine	Augur Magazine	
2020	Robert Runté	“Dave Duncan's Legacy” from On Spec (#111)	Essay	Copper Pig Writers' Society	
2020	Ranylt Richildis	Lackington's	Magazine	Lackington's	
2020	Karl Johanson	Neo-opsis	Magazine	Magazines Canada	
2020	Cait Gordon & Talia C. Johnson	Nothing Without Us	Anthology	Renaissance Press	
2020	Jen R. Albert & Cherae Clark	PodCastle	Podcast	Escape Artists	
2021	Diane Walton*	On Spec	Magazine	Copper Pig Writers' Society	
2021	Kerry C. Byrne, Alexander De Pompa & Lawrence Stewen	Augur (#3.1 and #3.2)	Magazine	Augur Magazine	
2021	Amanda Leduc	Disfigured: On Fairy Tales, Disability, and Making Space	Non-fiction	Coach House	
2021	Jen R. Albert & Cherae Clark	PodCastle	Podcast	Escape Artists	
2021	Stacey Kondla	Prairie Gothic	Anthology	Prairie Soul Press	
2021	Rhonda Parrish	Swashbuckling Cats: Nine Lives on the Seven Seas	Anthology	Tyche Books	
2022	Kelly Robson*	Alias Space and Other Stories	Collection	Subterranean Press	
2022	Candas Jane Dorsey & Ursula Pflug	Food of My People	Anthology	Exile Editions	
2022	Karl Johanson	Neo-opsis (#32)	Magazine	Magazines Canada	
2022	Diane Walton	On Spec (#116, 117, 118)	Magazine	Copper Pig Writers' Society	
2022	Susan Forest & Lucas K. Law	Seasons Between Us: Tales of Identities and Memories	Anthology	Laksa Media	
2023	Shannon Allen and JR Campbell*	The Astronaut Always Rings Twice		Tyche	
2023	Cait Gordon and Talia C. Johnson*	Nothing Without Us Too		Renaissance	
2023	Diane Walton	On Spec	Magazine	The Copper Pig Writers' Society	
2023	Stacey Kondla	Prairie Witch		Prairie Soul	
2023	Don Miasek	Strange Wars: Speculative Fiction of Coalitions in Conflict		TDotSpec	
2024	Stephen Kotowych*	Year's Best Canadian Fantasy and Science Fiction: Volume One	Anthology	Ansible	
2024	Stephen Kotowych and Tony Pi	GAME ON!		Zombies Need Brains LLC	
2024	Suzan Palumbo	Skin Thief: Stories	Collection	Neon Hemlock	
2024	Premee Mohamed	No One Will Come Back for Us and Other Stories	Collection	Undertow	
2024	Diane Walton	On Spec Magazine	Magazine	The Copper Pig Writers' Society	
2025	Stephen Kotowych*	Year's Best Canadian Fantasy and Science Fiction: Volume Two	Anthology	Ansible	
2025	Sofia Ajram	Bury Your Gays: An Anthology of Tragic Queer Horror	Anthology	Ghoulish	
2025	Kerry C. Byrne, Toria Liao, André Geleynse, Frankie Hagg, and Conyer Clayton	Augur	Magazine	Augur Society	
2025	Michael Kelly	Northern Nights		Undertow	
2025	Diane Walton	On Spec Magazine	Magazine	The Copper Pig Writers' Society	
2026	Stephen Kotowych*	Year's Best Canadian Fantasy and Science Fiction: Volume Three	Anthology	Ansible Press	
2026	Terese Mason Pierre	As the Earth Dreams: Black Canadian Speculative Stories	Anthology	House of Anansi Press	
2026	Kerry C. Byrne, Toria Liao, André Geleynse, Kelley Tai, and Azure Arther	Augur Magazine, Issues 8.1-8.3	Magazine	Augur Society	
2026	Diane L. Walton	On Spec Magazine, Issues #131 – 134, Vol 35	Magazine	The Copper Pig Writers’ Society	
2026	Premee Mohamed	One Message Remains	Anthology	Psychopomp	

== French-language Award ==
=== Winners and nominees ===
* Winners and joint winners

Year	Editor/Creator(s)	Work	Category	Publisher/Publication	Ref.
1989	Luc Pomerleau*	Solaris	Magazine	Solaris	
1990	Luc Pomerleau*	Solaris	Magazine	Solaris	
1991	Luc Pomerleau*	Solaris	Magazine	Solaris	
1992	Luc Pomerleau*	Solaris	Magazine	Solaris	
1993	Joël Champetier*	Solaris	Magazine	Solaris	
1994	Guy Bouchard*	42 210 univers de la science-fiction (42 210 Universe of Science Fiction)	Non-fiction	Le Passeur	
1995	Joël Champetier*	Solaris	Magazine	Solaris	
1996	Joël Champetier*	Solaris	Magazine	Solaris	
1997	Joël Champetier*	Solaris	Magazine	Solaris	
1998	Hugues Morin*	Solaris	Magazine	Solaris	
1999	Jean-Louis Trudel*	Reviews	Journalism	Solaris	
2000	Joël Champetier*	Solaris	Magazine	Solaris	
2002	Joël Champetier*	Solaris	Magazine	Solaris	
2004	Joël Champetier*	Solaris	Magazine	Solaris	
2006	Joël Champetier*	Solaris	Magazine	Solaris	
2007	Jean-Louis Trudel*	Aux origines des petits hommes verts (On the Origin of Small Green Men)	Non-fiction	Unknown	
2009	Joël Champetier*	Solaris	Magazine	Solaris	
2010	Joël Champetier*	Solaris	Magazine	Solaris	
2011	Joël Champetier*	Solaris	Magazine	Solaris	
2012	Claude Janelle*	Le DALIAF (Dictionnaire des auteurs des littératures de l'imaginaire en Amérique française) (The Dictionary of Authors of Fiction of a Fantasy French America)	Anthology	Alire	
2013	Joël Champetier*	Solaris	Magazine	Solaris	
2014	Joël Champetier*	Solaris	Magazine	Solaris	
2014	Ariane Gélinas, Alamo St-Jean & Guillaume Voisine	Brins d’éternité	Magazine	Brins d’éternité	
2014	Ariane Gélinas	Le Sabbat des éphémères (Sabbath Ephemeral)	Anthology	Les Six Brumes	
2014	Mario Tessier	Les Carnets du Futurible (Notes from Futurible)	Journalism	Solaris (#185-188)	
2015	Joël Champetier*	Solaris	Magazine	Solaris	
2015	Ariane Gélinas, Alamo St-Jean & Guillaume Voisine	Brins d’éternité	Magazine	Brins d’éternité	
2015	Luc Dagenais	Direction du collectif 6, Chalet des brumes (6 Question Collection, House of Mists)	Journalism	Les Six Brumes	
2015	Ariane Gélinas	Dix ans d'éternité (10 Years of Eternity)	Anthology	Les Six Brumes	
2015	Daniel Sernine	Petits Démons (Little Demons)	Anthology	Les Six Brumes	
2016	Joël Champetier*	Solaris	Magazine	Solaris	
2016	Pierre-Alexandre Bonin	Je me souviens : modalités de la mémoire artificielle chez Isaac Asimov et Philip K. Dick (I Remember: Modalities of Artificial Memory from Isaac Asimov & Philip K. Dick	Journalism	Solaris (#196)	
2016	Ariane Gélinas, Alamo St-Jean & Guillaume Voisine	Brins d’éternité	Magazine	Brins d’éternité	
2016	Pierre-Luc Lafrance	L'Arracheur de rêves (The Dream Snatcher)	Anthology	Les Six Brumes	
2016	Mario Tessier	Les Carnets du Futurible (Notes from Futurible)	Journalism	Solaris (#193-196)	
2017	Jean Pettigrew*	Solaris	Magazine	Solaris	
2017	Alain Ducharme	La République du Centaure (The Centaur Republic)	Journalism	Brins d'éternité (#44)	
2017	Ariane Gélinas	Les murmurantes (The Whispering)	Anthology	Les Six Brumes	
2017	Ariane Gélinas, Alamo St-Jean & Guillaume Voisine	Brins d’éternité	Magazine	Brins d’éternité	
2017	Mario Tessier	Les Carnets du Futurible (Notes from Futurible)	Journalism	Solaris (#197-200)	
2018	Jean-Louis Trudel*	Petit Guide de la science-fiction au Québec (Little Guide to Quebecois Science Fiction)	Non-Fiction	Alire	
2018	Geneviève Blouin, Isabelle Lauzon & Carl Rocheleau	Écrire et publier au Québec: les littératures de l'imaginaire (Writing and Publishing in Québec: The Literature of Imagination)	Non-Fiction	Les Six Brumes	
2018	Pierre-Alexandre Bonin	Horrificorama	Anthology	Les Six Brumes	
2018	Ariane Gélinas, Alamo St-Jean & Guillaume Voisine	Brins d’éternité	Magazine	Brins d’éternité	
2018	Alain Ducharme	La République du Centaure (The Centaur Republic)	Journalism	Brins d'éternité	
