= Aurora Award for Best Poem/Song =

Canadian speculative-fiction award

- Sponsored by: Canadian SF and Fantasy Association and SFSF Boreal Inc.
- First award: 2011

The Aurora Awards are granted annually by the Canadian SF and Fantasy Association and SFSF Boreal Inc. The Award for Best Poem/Song was first awarded in 2011 when the Prix Aurora and Prix Boreal merged into one. Previously, poems had been recognized under the Best Short Fiction category, and songs had been nominated in the Best Related Work category. The award is only granted in the English-language Awards, with the equivalent awards for French-language poetry coming under the Best Short Fiction category, and music coming under the Best Audiovisual Artistic Creation category (which does not have a direct English-language equivalent).

No award was given in 2017, as there were insufficient nominations.

== Winners and nominees ==
* Winners and joint winners

Year	Author(s)	Work	Publisher/Publication	Result	Ref.
2011	Carolyn Clink*	"The ABCs of the End of the World"	A Verdant Green	Winner	
2011	Sandra Kasturi	"Let the Night In"	Evolve: Vampire Stories of the New Undead	Finalist	
2011	Colleen Anderson	"Of the Corn: Kore's Innocence"	Witches & Pagans (#21)	Finalist	
2011	Robert J. Sawyer	"The Transformed Man"	Tesseracts (Vol. 14): Strange Canadian Stories	Finalist	
2011	Helen Marshall	"Waiting for the Harrowing"	ChiZine (#45)	Finalist	
2012	Helen Marshall*	"Skeleton Leaves"	Kelp Queen	Winner	
2012	Colleen Anderson	"A Good Catch"	Polu Texni, Apr 2011	Finalist	
2012	Sandra Kasturi	"Ode to the Mongolian Death Worm"	ChiZine (#47)	Finalist	
2012	Heather Dale & Ben Deschamps	"Skeleton Woman"	Fairytale	Finalist	
2012	Carolyn Clink	"Zombie Bees of Winnipeg"	ChiZine (#47)	Finalist	
2013	David Clink*	"A Sea Monster Tells His Story"	Literary Review of Canada, Jul/Aug 2012	Winner	
2013	Helen Marshall	"The Ghost of Birds"	Phantom Drift 2: Valuable Estrangements	Finalist	
2013	Leah Bobet	"Hold Fast"	Strange Horizons, Jun 11, 2012	Finalist	
2013	Sandra Kasturi	"Roc"	Come Late to the Love of Birds	Finalist	
2013	Carolyn Clink	"Zombie Descartes Writes a Personal Ad"	Tesseracts (Vol. 16): Parnassus Unbound	Finalist	
2014	Eileen Kernaghan*	"Night Journey: West Coast"	Tesseracts (Vol. 17): Speculating Canada from Coast to Coast to Coast	Winner	
2014	Peter Storey	"Awake"	Urban Green Man	Finalist	
2014	David Clink	"A City of Buried Rivers"	Literary Review of Canada, Nov 2013	Finalist	
2014	Helen Marshall	"The Collected Post Cards of Billy the Kid"	Postscripts to Darkness (#4), Oct 2013	Finalist	
2014	Amal El-Mohtar	"Lost"	Strange Horizons, Feb 25, 2013	Finalist	
2014	Amal El-Mohtar	"Turning the Leaves"	Apex Magazine (#55), Dec 2013	Finalist	
2015	Tony Pi*	"A Hex, with Bees"	Tesseracts (Vol. 18): Wrestling with Gods	Winner	
2015	Helen Marshall	"Aversions"	Goblin Fruit, Summer 2014	Finalist	
2015	David Clink	"The Machine"	Tesseracts (Vol. 18): Wrestling with Gods	Finalist	
2015	Amal El-Mohtar	"The New Ways"	Uncanny (#1), Nov/Dec 2014	Finalist	
2015	David Clink	"The Perfect Library"	If the World Were to Stop Spinning	Finalist	
2016	Naru Dames Sundar*	"Origami Crane" / "Light Defying Spaceship"	Liminality (#5)	Winner	
2016	David Clink	"Elegy for WLC"	The Dalhousie Review (94:3)	Finalist	
2016	David Clink	"Portrait"	On Spec (#99)	Finalist	
2016	Sandra Kasturi	"Typhon & Echidna: A Love Story"	Gods, Memes, and Monsters: A 21st Century Bestiary	Finalist	
2016	Sandra Kasturi	"Venice Letting Go"	Postscripts to Darkness (#6), Apr 2015	Finalist	
2017	NO AWARD GIVEN; INSUFFICIENT NOMINEES				
2018	Matt Moore*	"Heaven Is the Hell of No Choices"	Polar Borealis (#4), Jul/Aug 2017	Winner	
2018	David Clink	"After Midnight"	Tesseracts (Vol. 20): Compostela	Finalist	
2018	J. J. Steinfeld	"The Canadian Small-Town Denizen and the Distant-Planet Space Traveller"	49th Parallels	Finalist	
2018	Catherine Girczyc	"Card"	Tesseracts (Vol. 20): Compostela	Finalist	
2018	Rhea Rose	"Cruising Glaciers"	49th Parallels	Finalist	
2018	Lynne Sargent	"Meat Puppets"	Polar Borealis (#4), Jul/Aug 2017	Finalist	
2018	Lee F. Patrick	"Shadows in the Mist"	Polar Borealis (#4), Jul/Aug 2017	Finalist	
2019	Sarah Tolmie*	"Ursula Le Guin in the Underworld"	On Spec (#107)	Winner	
2019	Shannon Allen	"Echoes"	By the Light of Camelot	Finalist	
2019	Vanessa Cardui	"How My Life Will End"	Shades Within Us: Tales of Migrations and Fractured Borders	Finalist	
2019	Leah Bobet	"Osiris'"	Uncanny (#25), Nov/Dec 2018	Finalist	
2019	Sandra Kasturi	"Trips to Impossible Cities"	Amazing Stories, Winter 2018	Finalist	
2020	Swati Chavda*	"At the Edge of Space and Time"	Love at the Speed of Light	Winner	
2020	Sora*	"Bursts of Fire"	—	Winner	
2020	Lynne Sargent	"Beauty, Sleeping"	Augur (#2.2), August 2019	Finalist	
2020	Tyler Hagemann	"The Day the Animals Turned to Sand"	Amazing Stories, Spring 2019	Finalist	
2020	Clara Blackwood	"The Girl Who Loved Birds"	Amazing Stories, Spring 2019	Finalist	
2020	David Clink	"Steampunk Christmas"	Star*Line, Fall 2019	Finalist	
2020	Francine P. Lewis	"Totemic Ants"	Amazing Stories, Fall 2019	Finalist	
2021	Jo Walton*	"Nidhog"	The Book of Dragons	Winner	
2021	Dominik Parisien	"Arachnoid Cyst"	This Magazine, Mar/Apr 2020	Finalist	
2021	David Clink	"Back Story"	Strange Horizons, Sep 2020	Finalist	
2021	Leah Bobet	"The Death of the Gods"	Uncanny (#32), Jan/Feb 2020	Finalist	
2021	Y. M. Pang	"Electra"	Arsenika, Win 2020	Finalist	
2021	Lynne Sargent	"Hamilton Harbour"	A Refuge of Tales	Finalist	
2021	Beth Cato & Rhonda Parrish	"he scores"	Star*Line, Spring 2020	Finalist	
2021	Colleen Anderson	"Masquerade"	On Spec (#115)	Finalist	
2022	Carolyn Clink*	"Cat People Café"	Polar Starlight (#3), Oct 2021	Winner	
2022	Tiffany Morris	"Crossroads"	Nightmare (#110), Nov 2021	Finalist	
2022	Matt Moore	"My Pillow Eats Screams"	Polar Starlight (#4), Dec 2021	Finalist	
2022	Yilin Wang	"The Reality of Ghosts"	Fantasy (#70), Aug 2021	Finalist	
2022	James Grotkowski	"Them + Us"	Polar Borealis (#19), Aug/Sep 2021	Finalist	
2022	Richard Van Camp	"Widow"	Food of My People	Finalist	
2023	Melissa Yuan-Innes*	"Rapunzel in the Desert"	On Spec Win 2022	Winner	
2023	Colleen Anderson	"After the Apocalypse"	NewMyths Dec 2022	Finalist	
2023	James Grotkowski	"Ghost Stories"	Polar Starlight 6	Finalist	
2023	Terese Mason Pierre	"In Stock Images of the Future, Everything is White"	Uncanny May/Jun 2022	Finalist	
2023	Rhonda Parrish	"Poltergeist"	Star*Line Spr 2022	Finalist	
2023	Dominik Parisien	"a sinkhole invites a street to consider its future"	Uncanny Jan/Feb 2022	Finalist	
2023	Geoffrey W. Cole	"Three Herons"	Polar Starlight 5	Finalist	
2023	Lynne Sargent	"The Wolf of Your Passions"	Augur 5.2	Finalist	
2024	Tiffany Morris*	"Awakening"	Nightmare Nov 2023	Winner	
2024	Kelley Tai	"As a, I want to, so I can"	Heartlines Spec Spr/Sum 2023	Finalist	
2024	Lynne Sargent	"Lying Flat"	Strange Horizons Oct 2023	Finalist	
2024	Dominik Parisien	"predictive text"	Augur Jun 2023	Finalist	
2024	David Schultz	"Scarecrow"	Polar Starlight Mar 2023	Finalist	
2024	Ai Jiang	"A Siren's Call, A Banshee's Wail, A Grandmother's Dream"	Uncanny Sep/Oct 2023	Finalist	
2025	Y.M. Pang*	"Cthulhu on the Shores of Osaka"	Invitation: A One-shot Anthology of Speculative Fiction	Winner	
2025	Shantell Powell	"Angakkuq"	On Spec Magazine, Vol 24, Issue 130	Finalist	
2025	Beth Cato and Rhonda Parrish	"Her Favourite"	Star*Line, Vol 47, Issue 4	Finalist	
2025	J.D. Dresner	"Horizon Events"	Polar Starlight, Issue #15	Finalist	
2025	Lynne Sargent	"A Thirst for Adventure"	Polar Borealis, Issue #28	Finalist	
2025	Carolyn Clink and David Clink	"Trip Through the Robot"	Giant Robot Poems: On Mecha-Human Science, Culture & War	Finalist	
2026	J. Y. Zhang*	From Dust	Small Wonders	Winner	
2026	Lisa Timpf	At the Spaceport Bar	Polar Starlight Magazine #17	Finalist	
2026	Carolyn Clink	Bigfoot Farewell	Cryptids, Kaiju & Corn: Poems and Micro-Stories about Modern Midwest Monsters	Finalist	
2026	David Clink	Dragon Karaoke	Polar Starlight, Issue #18	Finalist	
2026	Derek Newman-Stille	Explosive	Polar Starlight #20	Finalist	
2026	Tiffany Morris	flowers without meadow	Eye to the Telescope #56	Finalist	
