= Chroniques du pays des mères =

1992 novel by Élisabeth Vonarburg

Chroniques du Pays des Mères
- Cover first edition
- Author: Élisabeth Vonarburg
- Language: French
- Genre: Science fiction novel
- Published: 1992 Alire
- Publication place: Canada
- Media type: Print (Paperback)
- Preceded by: Le Silence de la Cité

Chroniques du Pays des Mères is a French language science fiction novel by Élisabeth Vonarburg. It was first published in Canada in 1992 and has been translated in English under the title In the Mothers' Land and later republished in English as The Maerlande Chronicles. It won the Philip K. Dick Award (special citation) in 1992 and the Aurora Award for best long-form Canadian science-fiction work in French.

== Plot summary ==
The action takes place several centuries after the events of Le Silence de la Cité. Large areas have been drowned by the rising sea and most of Europe is now a poisoned wasteland. Due to a genetic mutation, women now outnumber men by 70 to 1. The collapsed society described in Le Silence de la Cité has been slowly rebuilt. Post-collapse warlord states have evolved into patriarchal kingdoms - the Harems - before being overthrown by the hives, female-run city-states, every bit as warlike and tyrannical as their male-run predecessors. Those have in turn been replaced by a more peaceful, female-dominated society organized as a loose federation of local communities.

The novel follows the life of Lisbeï, the daughter of the "mother" of the Betely community, in the province of Litale. Destined to succeed her she grows up with her sister and friend, Tula, her being barren prevents her from doing so. While exploring ruined tunnels she discovers documents which question everything her society thought it knew about its past.
