= Susan Forest =

Canadian author and editor

- Born: 1953 (age 72–73); Edmonton, Alberta, Canada
- Writing career
- Notable awards: Aurora Award for Best Related Work (2017, 2018); Aurora Award for Best YA Novel (2020, 2021)
- Website: speculative-fiction.ca

Susan Forest (born 1953) is a Canadian science fiction and fantasy author and editor. She has been nominated for eleven Aurora Awards, winning four times.

== Early life ==
Susan Forest was born in Edmonton, Alberta in 1953, the third of four children by Don, a mountaineer, and Margaret (née Dalton) Forest.

== Career ==
Forest began her career as an elementary school teacher and principal, holding the position of principal in a Calgary elementary school in 2003.

Her first novel, The Dragon Prince (1990) was a finalist for the 1993 Manitoba Young Readers' Choice Award. In the late 2000s, she began published several short stories. Her short fiction has been published in various venues, including Analog, Beneath Ceaseless Skies, InterGalactic Medicine Show, and On Spec. She has been a finalist for the Aurora Award for Best Short Fiction five times: "Back" (2009), "Turning It Off" (2012), "The Gift" (2014), "For A Rich Man to Enter" (2019), and "The Only Road" (2022). She published the short story collection Immunity to Strange Tales in 2012. Forest began publishing novels again with her Addicted to Heaven trilogy: Bursts of Fire (2019), Flights of Marigold (2020), and Gathering of Ghosts (2023); the first two books in the series won the Aurora Award for Best YA Novel.

In addition to her own writing, Forest has edited novels and short story collections. As of 2026, she has co-edited five anthologies: Strangers Among Us (2016), The Sum of Us (2017), Shades Within Us (2018), Seasons Between Us (2021), and Life Beyond Us (2023). Strangers Among Us and The Sum of Us won the Aurora Award for Best Related Work in 2017 and 2018, respectively, while Shades Within Us and Seasons Between Us were nominated for the award in 2019 and 2022, respectively. Strangers Among Us also won the 2017 Alberta Book Publishers' Award for Speculative Fiction Book of the Year.

Forest was the secretary of the Science Fiction and Fantasy Writers of America from 2013 to 2016.

== Personal life ==
Forest married Keith Osborne in Calgary on August 21, 1976. Though the couple separated in 1985, they had three living children, with Forest experiencing a miscarriage with her third child in 1983. In May 1990, Forest remarried to teaching colleague Don Totten, with whom she eventually had two children, Amy Totten and Holly Totten.

== Awards and honours ==
Locus included Shades Within Us, Seasons Between Us, and Life Beyond Us on their list of the year's best anthologies in 2018, 2021, and 2023, respectively. Tangent Online also included Forest's "To Go Home to Leal" on their list of the best short stories of 2012, and her "The Only Road" on their list of the best novelettes of 2021.

In 2017, Forest was named as a top ten contender for the Jim Baen Memorial Short Story Award.

Awards for Forest's works
Year	Work	Award	Result	Ref.
2009	"Back"	Aurora Award for Best Short Fiction	Finalist	
2012	"Turning It Off"	Aurora Award for Best Short Fiction	Finalist	
2014	"The Gift"	Aurora Award for Best Short Fiction	Finalist	
2017	Strangers Among Us	Alberta Book Publishers' Award for Speculative Fiction Book of the Year	Winner	
2017	Strangers Among Us	Aurora Award for Best Related Work	Winner	
2018	The Sum of Us	Aurora Award for Best Related Work	Winner	
2019	"For A Rich Man to Enter"	Aurora Award for Best Short Fiction	Finalist	
2019	Shades Within Us	Aurora Award for Best Related Work	Finalist	
2020	Bursts of Fire	Aurora Award for Best YA Novel	Winner	
2021	Flights of Marigold	Aurora Award for Best YA Novel	Winner	
2022	"The Only Road"	Aurora Award for Best Short Fiction	Finalist	
2022	Seasons Between Us	Aurora Award for Best Related Work	Finalist	

== Books ==
=== As author ===
==== Standalone novels ====
- Forest, Susan (1990). The Dragon Prince. Gage Educational Publishers.

==== Addicted to Heaven trilogy ====
1. Forest, Susan (2019). Bursts of Fire. Laksa Media Groups. ISBN 9781988140117.
2. Forest, Susan (2020). Flights of Marigold. Laksa Media Groups. ISBN 9781988140223.
3. Forest, Susan (2023). Gathering of Ghosts. Laksa Media Groups. ISBN 9781988140537.

==== Collections ====
- Forest, Susan (2012). Immunity to Strange Tales. Five Rivers Press. ISBN 9781927400142.

=== As editor ===
- Forest, Susan; Law, Lucas K., eds. (2016). Strangers Among Us: Tales of the Underdogs and Outcasts. Laksa Media Groups.
- Forest, Susan; Law, Lucas K., eds. (2017). The Sum of Us: Tales of the Bonded and Bound. Laksa Media Groups. ISBN 9781988140032.
- Forest, Susan; Law, Lucas K., eds. (2018). Shades Within Us: Tales of Migrations and Fractured Borders. Laksa Media Groups. ISBN 9781988140087.
- Forest, Susan; Law, Lucas K., eds. (2021). Seasons Between Us: Tales of Identities and Memories. Laksa Media Groups. ISBN 9781988140360.
- Nováková, Julie; Law, Lucas K.; Forest, Susan, eds. (2023). Life Beyond Us: An Original Anthology of SF Stories and Science Essays. European Astrobiology Institute and Laksa Media.
