= Suzan Palumbo =

Trinidadian-Canadian speculative fiction writer

Suzan Palumbo is a Trinidadian-Canadian speculative fiction writer and editor. She came to prominence with award-nominated short stories in horror and science fiction. In 2024, she published Countess, her first novella.

== Early life ==
Palumbo was born in Trinidad and Tobago in the 1980s. Her family moved to Canada when she was a child, and she grew up in Toronto, Canada, in the neighborhood of Rexdale. As of 2024, she lives in Brampton.

== Career ==
Palumbo's first published speculative fiction short stories included "Bloody Therapy" in 2017. Her 2021 story, "Laughter Among the Trees," was a finalist for the 2022 WSFA Small Press Award and the 2021 Nebula Award for Best Short Story. Her 2022 story "Douen," was a finalist for the World Fantasy Award for Best Short Fiction, Aurora Award for Best Short Fiction, and Nebula Award for Best Short Story.

Palumbo made her debut with the 2023 short story collection Skin Thief published by Neon Hemlock. Stories from Skin Thief had previously been nominated for Nebula and Aurora awards. The collection was also shortlisted for the 2024 Locus Award for Best Collection. Allison Wyss, writing for Split Lip, describes it as "luscious and terrifying," drawing from a range of genres and inspirations to subvert classic stories via tales of modern horror. Wyss says that skin is used as a metaphor for identity throughout the collection, often serving as the symbol of queer women's transformations.

In 2023, Palumbo guest-edited the Caribbean special issue of Strange Horizons with Marika Bailey.

In 2024 Palumbo published Countess, a re-telling of The Count of Monte Cristo published by ECW Press. It is a queer science fiction novella featuring Virika Sameroo, a first lieutenant on an imperial cargo ship who is falsely accused of murder and imprisoned for ten years. In jail, she plots revenge against the empire that had betrayed her. Sameroo is lesbian and Indo-Caribbean with Afro-Caribbean ancestry, and the story has anti-colonial themes. Palumbo describes the setting of the book as rooted in the history of the Caribbean: in the story, climate change pressures people from the Caribbean to leave Earth via indentured labor to space corporations, and this is inspired by the forced migration due to climate change today. Similarly, colonization takes place at the scale of planets, and characters like Sameroo are pressured to occupy the role of the model minority as immigrants trying to thrive in the empire. Liz Bourke, writing for Locus, loved the first half of the novella and its character-focused examination of Sameroo's journey through prison. Bourke thought the second half was too underdeveloped to enjoy the novella as a whole, but appreciated the work's themes, setting, and tone. Patricia Elzie-Tuttle, reviewing for Book Riot, praised the novella as a must-read, particularly noting Palumbo's skill in showing Sameroo's despair. Dan Hartland, for Strange Horizons, praised the novella's "rare historical sensibility and canny self-questioning," relating the story to a wave of new space opera works that enliven the genre towards contemporary times.

Palumbo is also a founding member of the Ignyte Awards, co-creating the award in 2020 with fellow writer and editor L. D. Lewis.

== Awards ==
| Year | Title | Award | Category | Result | Ref |
|---|---|---|---|---|---|
| 2022 | "Laughter Among the Trees" | Nebula Award | Nebula Award for Best Short Story | Nominated | |
| 2023 | "Douen" | Nebula Award | Nebula Award for Best Short Story | Nominated | |
| 2023 | "Douen" | World Fantasy Award | World Fantasy Award—Short Fiction | Nominated | |
| 2023 | "Douen" | Aurora Award | Aurora Award for Best Short Fiction | Nominated | |
| 2024 | Skin Thief: Stories | Aurora Award | Aurora Award for Best Related Work | Nominated | |
| 2024 | Skin Thief: Stories | Locus Award | Locus Award for Best Collection | 4th | |
| 2025 | Countess | Locus Award | Locus Award for Best Novella | 10th | |
| 2025 | Countess | Nebula Award | Nebula Award for Best Novella | Nominated | |
| 2025 | Countess | Aurora Award | Aurora Award for Best Novelette/Novella | Nominated | |

== Bibliography ==
- Skin Thief, 2023
- Countess, 2024
