= Éric Gauthier =

Éric Gauthier may refer to:

- Éric Gauthier (writer) (born 1975), Quebecois author
- Eric Gauthier (dancer) (born 1977), Canadian-born dancer, choreographer and musician
