= Silver Screamers =

- Directed by: Sean Cisterna
- Screenplay by: Sean Cisterna
- Produced by: Ivonete de Sousa
- Starring: Diane Ament; Bari-Lynne Butters; Audrey Cameron; Anthony Garramone; Sonny Lauzon; David Swift; Edo van Belkom; Jayne Eastwood
- Cinematography: Danny Dunlop
- Edited by: Lee Walker
- Music by: Janal Bechthold
- Production company: Mythic Productions
- Distributed by: Blue Ice Pictures
- Release date: September 19, 2025 (Fantastic Fest)
- Running time: 94 minutes
- Country: Canada
- Language: English

Silver Screamers is a 2025 Canadian documentary film, directed by Sean Cisterna. The film profiles a group of senior citizens who come together on a creative project to produce their own amateur film adaptation of Edo van Belkom's short story "The Rug".

The film premiered at Fantastic Fest on September 19, 2025, and had its Canadian premiere on September 21 at the 2025 Cinéfest Sudbury International Film Festival. At both festivals, it screened in conjunction with the completed The Rug.

In April 2024, it was reported that the film had been acquired for theatrical distribution by Blue Ice Pictures.

== Reception ==
On the review aggregator website Rotten Tomatoes, 91% of 11 critics' reviews are positive, with an average rating of 7.8/10.

Kent Hill of Film Threat gave the film a score of 9.5 out of 10, writing, "In the end, Silver Screamers shows us the exquisiteness of life and the cinema, and how the two can come together to create a movie about a flesh-eating rug. In a word, wonderful."
