= The Silent City =

1981 novel by Élisabeth Vonarburg

- First edition (French)
- Author: Élisabeth Vonarburg
- Original title: Le Silence de la cité
- Cover artist: Stéphane Dumont
- Language: French
- Genre: Science fiction
- Publisher: Denoël
- Publication date: 1981
- Publication place: Canada
- Media type: Print (Paperback)
- Followed by: Chroniques du Pays des Mères

Le Silence de la cité is a French language science-fiction novel by Élisabeth Vonarburg. It was first published in Canada in 1981 and has been translated in English under the title The Silent City. It received the 1982 Prix Rosny-Aîné and Grand prix de la science-fiction française (grand prize of French science-fiction).
