= Linda Smith (novelist) =

Canadian writer

- Born: 1949
- Died: 2007 (aged 57–58)
- Occupation: Author
- Genre: Children's literature

Linda Smith (1949–2007) was a Canadian writer.

== Biography ==
Born in Lethbridge, Alberta, on April 12, 1949, Linda grew up in Calgary, Alberta. She obtained a B.A. with Distinction from the University of Calgary in 1969, and then a Bachelor of Library Science degree from the University of Alberta in 1970. She worked as a children's librarian in Truro, Nova Scotia, and Saskatoon, Saskatchewan, where she was also manager of the Carlyle King Branch of Saskatoon Public Library. From 1982 to 1984, she pursued a master's degree in Children's Literature from Simmons College in Boston, and it was there that she took a writing for children course from Nancy Bond. Returning to Canada, she became children's librarian at Grande Prairie Public Library in northern Alberta, and also began writing.

Her first book Windshifter was published in 1995. She wrote primarily for children and young adults, and her books benefited from her years of experience as a children's librarian and her love of children's literature. She published two linked fantasy trilogies aimed at upper elementary and junior high readers, The Freyan Trilogy, and The Tales of Three Lands Trilogy, and wrote two books for younger readers: a picture book, Sir Cassie to the Rescue, and a beginning chapter book called Kelly's Cabin. Coteau Books posthumously published two other young adult fantasies by her: The Broken Thread, in 2008, which in 2010 won the Alberta Literary Award for children's literature and The Piper of Shadonia in 2012. In addition, several of her short stories were published in magazines such as On Spec, or read on CBC Radio's Alberta Anthology program.

== Bibliography ==
- Wind Shifter (1995)
- Sea Change (1999)
- The Turning Time (2001)
- Sir Cassie to the Rescue (2003)
- The Minstrel's Daughter (2004)
- Talisa's Song (2005)
- Weathermage (2006)
- Kelly's Cabin (2006)
- The Broken Thread (2008)
- The Piper of Shadonia (2012)

== See also ==
- List of Canadian science fiction authors
