= Helen Marshall (writer) =

Canadian writer and academic

- Born: 1983 (age 42–43); Sarnia, Ontario, Canada
- Education: University of Guelph (BA); University of Toronto (PhD)
- Occupations: Writer, academic
- Writing career
- Genres: Speculative fiction, horror, fantasy
- Notable works: Gifts for the One Who Comes After (2014); The Migration (2019); The Lady, the Tiger and the Girl Who Loved Death
- Notable awards: Shirley Jackson Award; World Fantasy Award; British Fantasy Award; Sunburst Award

Helen Marshall (born September 7, 1983) is a Canadian speculative fiction writer and academic. She has won the Sunburst Award, Convenors' Award for Excellence, Shirley Jackson Award, World Fantasy Award, and British Fantasy Award.

== Background ==
Marshall was born in Sarnia, Ontario, to parents who emigrated from South Africa. She attended the St. Christopher Catholic Secondary School. She became interested in medieval studies as a child and joined a local re-enactment group, the Society for Creative Anachronism.

She holds a BA in English from the University of Guelph and a PhD from the Centre for Medieval Studies at the University of Toronto, supervised by Alexandra Gillespie. Her doctoral research examined late medieval English manuscripts, including copies of Chaucer's The Canterbury Tales. She then held a two-year postdoctoral fellowship at the University of Oxford, studying literature written during the Black Death.

== Career ==
Marshall's first short story collection Hair Side, Flesh Side won the 2013 British Fantasy Award for Best Newcomer (Sydney J. Bounds Award) and was nominated for the 2013 Aurora Award for Best Related Work. Her poem, “The Ghosts of Birds” (appearing in Phantom Drift 2: Valuable Estrangements) was shortlisted for the 2013 Aurora Award for Best Canadian Speculative Poem.

Her 2014 collection Gifts for the One Who Comes After includes dark, surreal, and moving tales that explore legacies, omens, and curses that are passed down to children. The collection won the 2014 Shirley Jackson Award for Best Single-Author Collection and tied as winner for the 2015 World Fantasy Award for Best Collection. It was also nominated for the 2014 Bram Stoker Award for Best Fiction, the 2015 British Fantasy Award for Best Collection, the 2015 Aurora Award for Best Related Work, and the 2015 ReLit Award for Short Fiction.

Her debut novel The Migration, published in 2019, was nominated for the 2020 British Fantasy Awards in two categories, Best Fantasy Novel and Best Horror Novel. Her 2023 collection, The Gold Leaf Executions, was nominated for the 2023 Aurealis Award for Best Collection. Story Thinking, a non-fiction book co-written with Lisa Bennett and Kim Wilkins, won the 2025 Convenors' Award for Excellence.

In 2026 she won the 2026 Sunburst Award for Excellence in Canadian Literature of the Fantastic for her second novel The Lady, the Tiger and the Girl Who Loved Death.

Marshall was a lecturer in Creative Writing and Publishing at Anglia Ruskin University in Cambridge. She is currently an associate professor of creative writing at the University of Queensland in Brisbane, Australia.

== Awards and honors ==
Year	Award	Type	Work	Result	Ref
2013	British Fantasy Award, Best Newcomer	Collection	Hair Side, Flesh Side	Won	
2013	Aurora Award, Best Related Work	Collection	Hair Side, Flesh Side	Nominated	
2013	Aurora Award for Best Canadian Speculative Poem	Poem	“The Ghosts of Birds”	Shortlisted	
2014	Shirley Jackson Award, Best Single-Author Collection	Collection	Gifts for the One Who Comes After	Won	
2014	Elgin Award	Chapbook	The Sex Lives of Monsters	Won	
2014	Bram Stoker Award, Best Fiction Collection	Collection	Gifts for the One Who Comes After	Nominated	
2015	World Fantasy Award, Best Collection	Collection	Gifts for the One Who Comes After	Won	
2015	British Fantasy Award, Best Collection	Collection	Gifts for the One Who Comes After	Nominated	
2015	Aurora Award, Best Related Work	Collection	Gifts for the One Who Comes After	Nominated	
2015	ReLit Award, Short Fiction	Collection	Gifts for the One Who Comes After	Nominated	
2020	British Fantasy Awards, Best Fantasy Novel	Novel	The Migration	Nominated	
2020	British Fantasy Awards, Best Horror Novel	Novel	The Migration	Nominated	
2023	Aurealis Award, Best Collection	Collection	The Gold Leaf Executions	Nominated	
2025	Aurealis Award, Convenors' Award for Excellence	Nonfiction	Story Thinking (with Lisa Bennett and Kim Wilkins)	Won	
2026	Sunburst Award for Excellence in Canadian Literature of the Fantastic	Collection	The Lady, the Tiger and the Girl Who Loved Death	Won	

== Bibliography ==
=== Novels ===
- The Migration (2019), Random House Canada; Titan Books (UK)

=== Collections ===
- Hair Side, Flesh Side (2012), ChiZine Publications
- Gifts for the One Who Comes After (2014), ChiZine Publications
- The Gold Leaf Executions (2023), Unsung Stories
- The Lady, the Tiger and the Girl Who Loved Death (2025), Titan Books

=== As editor ===
- The Year's Best Weird Fiction, Volume 4 (2017), Undertow Publications

=== Nonfiction ===
- Story Thinking and the Real-world Applications of Sci-Fi and Fantasy Writing (2025), with Lisa Bennett and Kim Wilkins, Bloomsbury

=== Poetry ===
- “The Ghosts of Birds” (2012) in Phantom Drift 2: Valuable Estrangements, Phantom Drift Limited

=== Audio drama ===
- Torchwood: The Hollow Choir (2024), with Malcolm Devlin, Big Finish Productions
