= Eric Choi =

Aerospace engineer, writer, and editor

- Born: May 1972 (age 54); Hong Kong
- Education: University of Toronto (BS; MS); York University (MBA); International Space University
- Writing career
- Notable awards: Aurora Award for Best Related Work (2010); Aurora Award for Best Short Fiction (2015); Sidewise Award for Short Form (2023)

Eric Choi (born 1972) is a Toronto-based aerospace engineer, writer, and editor. Choi has published several short stories that have been nominated for and won awards. He is also the co-editor of The Dragon and the Stars (2010) with Derwin Mak and Carbide Tipped Pens (2014), with Ben Bova. As of 2026, Choi is also the Vice President of Business Development at Mission Control Space Services.

Choi was born in Hong Kong in May 1972. His parents began the process of immigrating to Canada the following year, while Choi was living with his grandparents in Hong Kong. His sister was born in Toronto in 1974, then sent to live with their grandparents. Choi moved to Canada in February 1975, and his sister joined the family in Brampton in September 1978. His youngest sister was born in February 1987, followed by a brother in September 1991.

Choi attended the University of Toronto, from which he earned a Bachelor of Science in engineering science and a Master of Science in aerospace engineering, followed by a Master of Business Administration from York University. He also attended the International Space University.

== Awards and honors ==
Awards for Choi's work
Year	Work	Award	Result	Ref.
1994	"Dedication"	Dell Asimov Award	Winner	
1998	"Divisions"	Aurora Award for Best Short Fiction	Finalist	
2003	"Just Like Being There"	Aurora Award for Best Short Fiction	Finalist	
2010	The Dragon and the Stars	Aurora Award for Best English Related Work	Winner	
2015	"Crimson Sky"	Aurora Award for Best Short Fiction	Winner	
2020	"The Greatest Day"	Analog AnLab Award for Best Short Story	4th	
2022	"Second Thoughts"	Aurora Award for Best Short Fiction	Finalist	
2023	"A New Brave World"	Aurora Award for Best Short Fiction	Finalist	
2023	"A Sky and a Heaven"	Aurora Award for Best Novelette/Novella	Finalist	
2023	"A Sky and a Heaven"	Sidewise Award for Short Form	Winner	

== Books ==
- Mak, Derwin; Choi, Eric, eds. (2010). The Dragon and the Stars. DAW. ISBN 978-0-756-40618-9.
- Bova, Ben; Choi, Eric, eds. (2014). Carbide Tipped Pens: Seventeen Tales of Hard Science Fiction. Tor. ISBN 978-0-7653-3430-5.
- Choi, Eric (2022). Just Like Being There: A Collection of Science Fiction Short Stories. Springer Nature. doi:10.1007/978-3-030-91605-3. ISBN 978-3-030-91604-6.
