= Alexander Zelenyj =

Canadian author of speculative fiction

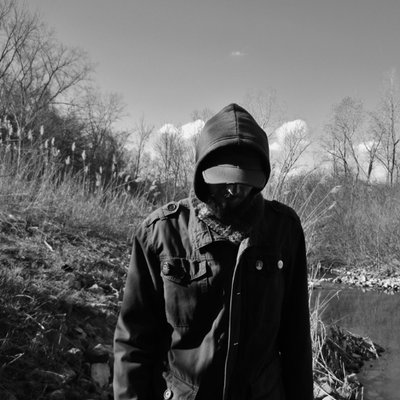
- Alexander Zelenyj - author photo from Blacker Against the Deep Dark (Eibonvale Press, 2018)

Alexander Zelenyj is a Canadian author of speculative fiction. He is known for the merging of genres in his stories, resulting in a visionary, original and difficult-to-define style. His fiction has literary underpinnings, though his work is infused with genre elements running the gamut from magical realism, horror, and science fiction to noir, historical, and western, in addition to more experimental forms such as Bizarro or surrealism. For this reason the term "slipstream" has often been used to describe his work, though some reviewers consider the term inadequate to define Zelenyj's unclassifiable style.

== Style ==
Thematically, Zelenyj's fiction often explores the darker side of the human condition. His stories are known for being emotionally harrowing, with elements of the surreal and bizarre interwoven among their plots. This emotional impact often has a melancholy tone, with violence, depression, and suicide being recurring themes. The Canadian landscape figures prominently in much of Zelenyj's work, specifically his home city of Windsor, Ontario and its surrounding environs. More generally, the city is often portrayed as a sinister place, and is frequently juxtaposed against the natural peace and beauty of rustic settings. A historical element recurs throughout his fiction, with a focus on war and its effects on those serving in the military as well as the family members of soldiers. Zelenyj's stories have examined both World Wars, the Vietnam War, colonial struggles in the American West, and Medieval-period conflict, among others, all filtered through a speculative fiction lens. Religious themes resonate through his fiction, particularly in the stories of Songs For The Lost, which depicts fringe spirituality in the form of organized suicide cults and individuals seeking spiritual escape from the trauma of their lives. Themes of apocalypse and post-apocalypse recur in his fiction. The dark quality inherent in much of Zelenyj's work gives it an apocalyptic tone even in those stories not dealing explicitly with end of the world scenarios.

Zelenyj's prose style has been described as burnished and literary, drawing comparisons to the work of authors such as Ray Bradbury, Richard Matheson, and Gabriel Garcia Marquez, as well as more contemporary slipstream authors such as Michael Cisco and D. P. Watt. Some of his recent work is more streamlined in nature.

Zelenyj's short story collections are known for their massive length, their merging of an eclectic variety of literary genres and styles, their often dark and melancholy subject matter, and for their thematic cohesion and inter-story links.

== Biography ==
Zelenyj lives in Windsor, Ontario with his wife, writer Elizabeth J. M. Walker, editor of Litzine 398.

== Bibliography ==
=== Books ===
- Beware Us Flowers of the Annihilator (hardcover edition, Eibonvale Press, 2024; trade paperback and digital editions published by Manta Press, 2025)
- These Long Teeth of the Night: The Best Short Stories 1999-2019 (hardcover, trade paperback, and digital edition, Fourth Horseman Press, 2022)
- The Long Dirty Night Trilogy (limited edition hardcover, Somniatis Press, 2022)
- Blacker Against the Deep Dark (hardcover and trade paperback, Eibonvale Press, 2018; digital edition, Eibonvale Press, 2023)
- Songs for the Lost (hardcover and trade paperback editions published by Eibonvale Press, 2014; digital eBook edition published by Independent Legions Publishing, 2016)
- Ballads to the Burning Twins: The Complete Song Lyrics of the Deathray Bradburys (hardcover and trade paperback, Eibonvale Press, 2014)
- Experiments At 3 Billion A.M. (hardcover and trade paperback, Eibonvale Press, 2009; revised edition 2015)
- Black Sunshine (trade paperback, Fourth Horseman Press, 2005)

=== Chapbooks ===
- Beware Us Flowers of the Devil (limited edition hardcover, Eibonvale Press, 2024; 2nd limited edition hardcover 2025)
- Blue Love Maria (hardcover, trade paperback, and digital editions, Foxhill Doubles No. 1, Foxhill Press, 2025)
- Hammer-Fights (limited edition hardcover, Somniatis Press, 2023)
- Bugs from the Black Box! (hardcover and trade paperback, Foxhill Press, 2021)
- Animals of the Exodus (hardcover and trade paperback, Eibonvale Press, 2019; German language edition, NightTrain/WhiteTrain Underground Press, 2022)
- A Test Tube Family (limited edition hardcover and trade paperback, Eibonvale Press, 2018)
- Forgotten Hymns of the Death Angels (limited edition hardcover and trade paperback, Eibonvale Press, 2014; 2nd edition, 2018)
