= W. H. C. Lawrence =

W. H. C. Lawrence was a Canadian science fiction writer remembered as the author of the late 19th century novel, Storm of '92, published in 1889, which posited the scenario of Canada winning a war against the United States. Eighty-five years later, in 1974, another Canadian author, Richard Rohmer revisited the theme in his novel, Ultimatum.
