= Tina Hunter =

Tina Hunter (born January 19, 1985) is a Canadian science fiction, fantasy and horror author as well as a blogger.

In 2009, Hunter had her first two short stories published in the "Seven Deadly Sins: Flash Fiction Challenge #1" anthology and two more stories were published in the "Creatures of the Night: Flash Fiction Challenge #2" anthology, both published by Absolute XPress. Another story was picked up for publication in "The Red Book: Chinese Whisperings" collaborative anthology, published by eMergent Press.

In 2010, Hunter published another short story in "The Yin Book: Chinese Whisperings" collaborative anthology, published by eMergent Press. There are rumours that Tina Hunter is also Tina Moreau, publisher and managing editor of Tyche Books Ltd but this has yet to be confirmed.

Hunter is residing in Edmonton, Alberta with her husband, one son and two large dogs.

== Complete list of works ==
Title	Year	Genre	Length	Summary
Seven Deadly Sins: Flash Fiction Challenge #1	2009	Science fiction	54 pages	"Three Little Pigs" and "Truth Will Out", were short stories selected for the Anthology published in April 2009.
Creatures of the Night: Flash Fiction Challenge #2	2009	Science fiction	82 pages	"Demon Disease" and "Mistakes Bite" were short stories selected for the Anthology published in October 2009.
The Red Book: Chinese Whisperings	2010	Fiction	112 pages	The fifth story in a collaborative anthology, titled "Innocence", published on January 1, 2010. All the stories are set in a North American university town and all ten characters/stories are interconnected.
The Yin Book: Chinese Whisperings	2010	Fiction	136 pages	The third story in a collaborative anthology, titled "Where The Heart Is", published on October 10, 2010. All the stories revolve around one woman's choice to abandon her suitcase in an airport and all ten stories are interconnected.
