= Éric Gauthier (writer) =

Québécois writer

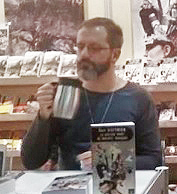
- Éric Gauthier in 2015
- Born: 1975 (age 50–51); Rouyn-Noranda, Quebec, Canada
- Occupations: Writer, storyteller
- Writing career
- Language: French, English
- Genres: Science fiction, fantasy
- Notable awards: Prix Boréal (x4); Prix Solaris (x3); Prix Jacques-Brossard (x3)
- Website: ericgauthier.net

Éric Gauthier is a Québécois writer and storyteller. He primarily writes science fiction and fantasy novels and novellas. He has won the prix Boréal four times (2000, 2006, 2009, 2012); the prix Solaris three times (1999, 2002, 2016); and the prix Jacques-Brossard three times (2003, 2012, 2020).

== Biography ==
Éric Gauthier was born in 1975 in Rouyn-Noranda, in the Abitibi region of Quebec. After a childhood spent in Abitibi, and computer science studies in Ottawa, Gauthier moved to Montréal. He eventually left his job as a computer scientist to pursue writing.

In 1999, Gauthier did a live storytelling performance at the pub Le Sergent Recruteur in Montréal and published his first short story. Though he had previous experience doing readings in Abitibi, the Montréal performance, part of Dimanches du Conte (Sundays of Storytelling), was the true start of his storytelling career. Since then, he has performed in places such as Yukon, France, and Serbia, as well as at festivals such as Le Rendez-vous des grandes gueules in Trois-Pistoles, Festival Voix d'Amérique in Montréal, Caf'Contes in Brittany, and Ottawa Storytelling Festival. In 2003, his solo show Feu blanc. Contes de la luna (White Fire: Tales of the Moon) was released as a book-CD. He sometimes tours with other members of Production Cormorant.

In addition to his readings and performances, Gauthier also teaches workshops and offers writing consultations. A resident of Sherbrooke, Gauthier is part of the Union des écrivaines et des écrivains québécois.

== Bibliography ==
- 2002: Terre des pigeons (Planète rebelle)
- 2008: Une fêlure au flanc du monde (Éditions Alire)
- 2009: Feu blanc (Planete Rebelle)
- 2011: Montréel (Éditions Alire)
- 2015: La grande mort de mononc' morbide (Éditions Alire)
- 2019: Le Saint Patron des plans foireux (Éditions Alire)
- 2021: Les Étages ultérieurs (Éditions Alire)

Additionally, his short stories have been published in magazines including Solaris, XYZ, and Mœbius. These stories include:

- Bientôt sur votre écran (Solaris, issue 139)
- Au bout du couloir (Solaris, issue 200)
- Le livre de trop (À l'est de l'apocalypse)

== Awards ==
Gauthier was the youngest person to receive the Grand prix de la science-fiction et du fantastique québécois during its 23-year history. It was renamed the Jacques-Brossard Prize for Science Fiction and Fantasy in 2008. Since then, he has won two more but is no longer the youngest winner. He received the inaugural Prix estrien de litterature de genre for his novel La grande mort de mononc' morbide in 2017.

Year	Award	Awarding body	Awarded for	Ref(s)
1999	Prix Solaris	Solaris	La Maison de l'anxitecte	
2000	Prix Boréal	SFSF Boréal Inc.	Best novella: Souvenir du Saudade Express	
2000	Prix Aurora	Canadian SF and Fantasy Association	Best French novella: Souvenir du Saudade Express	
2002	Prix Solaris	Solaris	Feu sacré	
2003	Grand Prix de la science-fiction et du fantastique québécois	Passport l'imaginaire	Terre des pigeons	
2006	Prix Boréal	SFSF Boréal Inc.	Best novella: Au jardin comme à la guerre	
2009	Prix Boréal	SFSF Boréal Inc.	Une felure au flanc du monde	
2012	Prix Boréal	SFSF Boréal Inc.	Montréel	
2012	Prix Jacques-Brossard	Passport l'imaginaire	Montréel	
2016	Prix Solaris	Solaris	Éclairer l'origine	
2017	Prix estrien de litterature de genre	L'Association des auteures et auteurs de l'Estrie	La grande mort de mononc' morbide	
2020:	Prix Jacques-Brossard	Passport l'imaginaire	Le Saint Patron des plans foireux and Le Livre de trop	
