= Alire =

Alire is both a surname and a given name. Notable people with the name include:

- Camila Alire, American librarian
- Alire Raffeneau Delile (1778–1850), French botanist
- Benjamin Alire Sáenz (born 1954), American poet, novelist and writer of children's books
