= Stephanie Bedwell-Grime =

Canadian author

Stephanie Bedwell-Grime is a Canadian author of fantasy, horror, science fiction, and romance novels. She has written more than a dozen novels and many pieces of short fiction. She has been nominated for the Prix Aurora Award four times: her novel Fallen Angel was a finalist for the 2005 Aurora Award for Best Novel; she was also nominated for the Aurora Award for Best Short Fiction for "Such Sweet Sorrow" (2005), "The Dead Go Shopping" (1996), and "In Your Dreams" (1997).

Bedwell-Grime is married to Derek Grime, an artist in the field of animation and visual effects.

== Published works ==
=== Angels ===
A set of contemporary tales set in Heaven, Hell, modern-day Toronto, and points in between.

- Guardian Angel
- Fallen Angel

=== Dark Fantasy ===
- Wishful Thinking
- Witch Island
- A Darker Passion
- The DeadWalk

=== Science fiction ===
- Starr Struck
- Beneath a Million Stars

=== Vampires ===
- The Bleeding Sun
- Dark Desire
- A Pirate's Life
- The Vampire Next Door
- The Vampire's Kitchen

=== Romance ===
- Honeymoon for One
- Puppy Love
- Fair Game, Inc.
- Heartbeat
