= J. C. Hall (author) =

Canadian writer

J. C. Hall is a Canadian author writing in the fantasy genre.

Hall was born in Hong Kong and educated in England. She lived and worked in Vancouver for ten years before moving to Toronto. When not writing, Hall trains for middle-distance races, and is involved in transcribing printed books into audio CDs for the blind.

Her published novels include Legends of the Serai and Lady of the Lakes. Lady of the Lakes is the first novel in the Silver Lakes trilogy and is being re-released by Zumaya Otherworlds, the science fiction/fantasy imprint of Zumaya Publications. Hall's poems, including Dusk and Dawn, and Lavender Shore, have appeared in various fantasy magazines, such as Glyph, The Journal of Fantasy and Legend. Her non-fiction writing includes book and movie reviews as well as travel articles.
