= Alain Bergeron =

Canadian writer

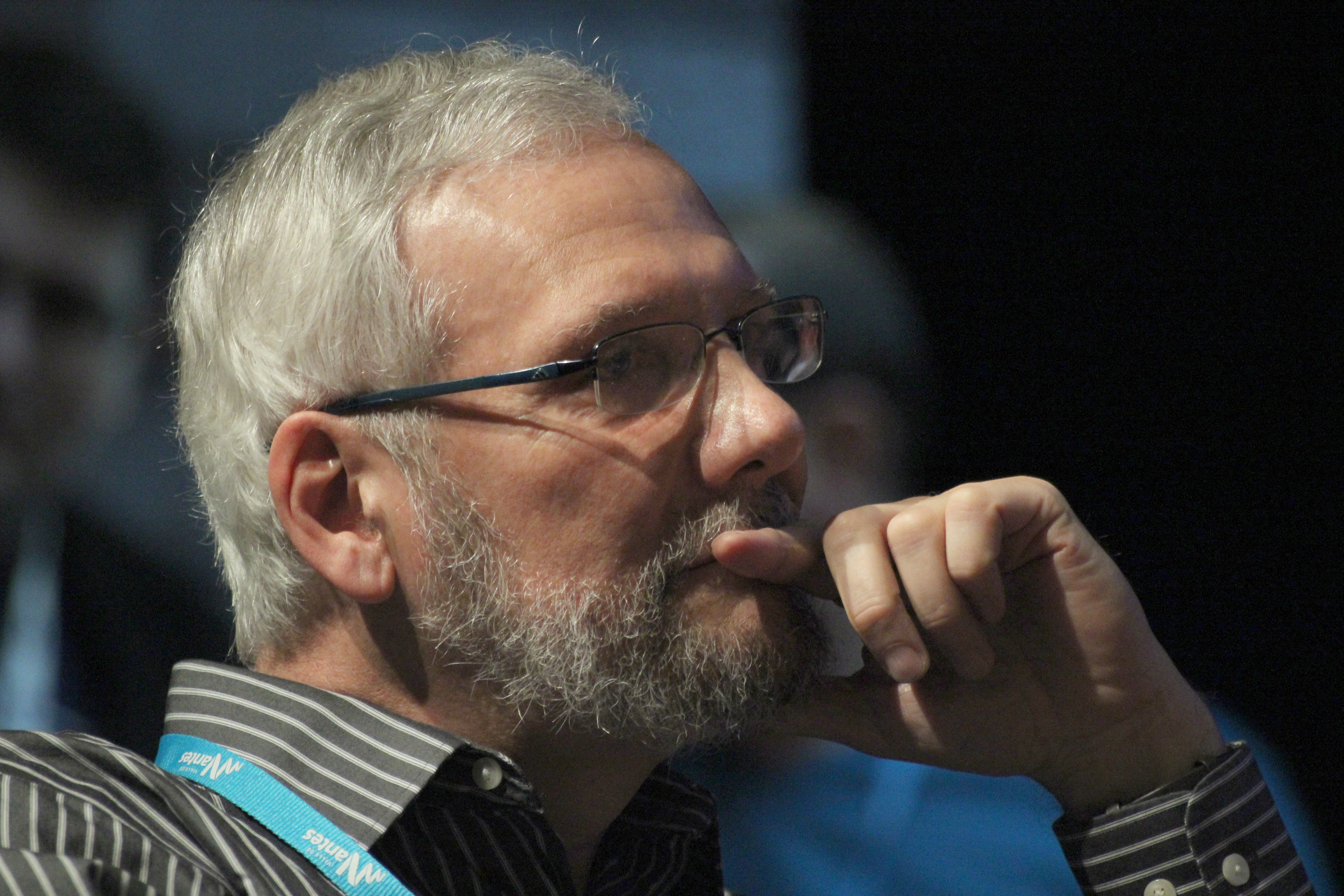
- Alain Bergeron in 2014
- Born: February 11, 1950 (age 76); Paris, France
- Occupations: novelist, political scientist

Alain Bergeron (born February 11, 1950) is a Québécois science fiction author and political scientist. He is also known by his pen name Brian Eaglenor (anagram of his name).

== Biography ==
Born in Paris, France, Bergeron now lives in Quebec. He earned a degree in social sciences from Université Laval. In 2004, he was appointed secretary general of the Science and Technology Council within the government of Quebec.

== Writing career ==
His first novel, A Summer of Jessica was published in 1978. In addition to being a science fiction writer, he is a columnist for Solaris magazine. With Laurine Spehner, he co-wrote a work about The X-Files.

Bergeron has received multiple Aurora Awards, the Prix Aurora Award and the Sidewise Award for Alternate History. In 2024, he received the Jacques-Brossard Prize for his book Le Silene Assassinated, the first volume in his Huitième Registre series.
