= Neo-opsis Science Fiction Magazine =

Science fiction magazine

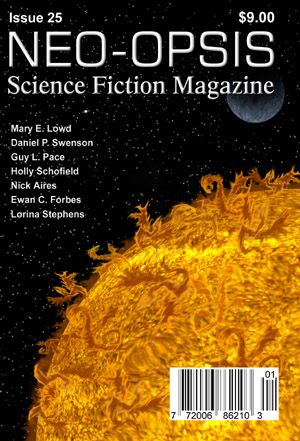
- "Sun Dragons" by Karl and Stephanie Johanson
- Editor: Karl Johanson
- Categories: science fiction, fantasy, science
- Format: Digest, perfect bound
- Founded: 2003
- Country: Canada
- Based in: Victoria, British Columbia
- Language: English
- Website: www.neo-opsis.ca
- ISSN: 1708-4865

Neo-opsis Science Fiction Magazine is a digest sized, perfect bound, Canadian magazine publishing science fiction and fantasy stories, science and opinion articles, SF news and reviews. Neo-opsis is based in Victoria, British Columbia, Canada. The first thirty issues were produced in print, with subsequent issues produced only in digital formats.

== History ==
- Neo-opsis premiered at VCon 28 in Vancouver, BC, October 10–12, 2003.
- Neo-opsis began being distributed to Canadian bookstores by Magazines Canada. 2004.
- The Best of Neo-opsis was published by Bundoran Press in October, 2006. This included stories from the first 12 issues.
- Bonus CD-Roms "of Amazingly Neat Stuff" were included with issues 4, 8, 12, 16, 20, and 24.
- Neo-opsis went to digital format only starting with issue 31.

== People ==
=== Karl Johanson ===
Editor: In addition to editing Neo-opsis], Karl is a writer, videographer, and computer game professional. Karl is a regular guest speaker at conventions, talking about science, science fiction, writing, publishing, gaming, sources of inspiration, and other topics.

=== Stephanie Ann Johanson ===
Assistant editor and Art Director: Stephanie Ann Johanson is an artist who works in a variety of media, sketching, pen & ink, oil and acrylic painting, soapstone carving, wire sculpture, and digital imagery to name just a few. Stephanie has been called a “science fiction activist”, because of her desire to encourage others to enjoy the genre.

== Awards ==
Awards for Neo-opsis
Year	Award	Result	Ref.
2004	Monday Magazine M Award for Best Magazine	Nominee	
2004	Aurora Award for Best Related Work	Finalist	
2005	Aurora Award for Best Related Work	Finalist	
2006	Aurora Award for Best Related Work	Finalist	
2007	Aurora Award for Best Related Work	Winner	
2008	Aurora Award for Best Related Work	Finalist	
2009	Aurora Award for Best Related Work	Winner	
2010	Aurora Award for Best Related Work	Finalist	
2012	Aurora Award for Best Related Work	Finalist	
2020	Aurora Award for Best Related Work	Finalist	
2022	Aurora Award for Best Related Work	Finalist	

== Quotes ==
- "Neo-opsis is the thinking man and woman's magazine."—Sandra Scholes (Reviewer)
- "Congratulations on a great concept with Neo-opsis. With such a variety of contributing writers and ideas, it’s first-class."—Al Harlow (Guitarist, songwriter, and lead vocalist for Prism.)
- "Johanson's sense of humour, evident in both of his columns, is also conspicuously present in his pick for the issue's first story, "On The Road With Fiamong's Rule" by Sherry D. Ramsey. If I had to put a label to that sense of humour, I'd call it mainstream geek: two parts Jerry Lewis, one part Richard Feynman, a pinch of Firesign Theater and a twist of aggressive oddity." --Jeremy Lyon (Reviewer)
- "Congratulations on a really fine job. It reads good, looks good, feels good, smells good, and for all I know tastes good as well."—Spider Robinson (Writer)
- "It's a great little publication, worthy of your time."—Lorina Stephens (Writer Publisher)
- "I recently received the copy you sent of Neo-opsis and I was quite pleased. The stories were strikingly good, lots better than I'd expected for the first issue of a semi-pro zine."—Rich Horton (Reviewer for Locus magazine)

== See also ==
- On Spec
- Science fiction magazine
- Fantasy fiction magazine
- Horror fiction magazine
- Aurora Awards
