= Space, Inc. =

2003 science fiction anthology

- Author: Various
- Cover artist: Jean-Pierre Normand
- Language: English
- Genre: Science fiction
- Publisher: DAW Books
- Publication date: 2003
- Publication place: United States
- Media type: Print (paperback)
- Pages: 319 p.
- ISBN: 0-7564-0147-X
- OCLC: 52475747
- LC Class: CPB Box no. 2084 vol. 15

Space, Inc. is a 2003 anthology of science fiction short-stories revolving around careers in space. It is the first anthology edited by Julie E. Czerneda, for which she won a 2004 Prix Aurora Award.

== Contents ==
Title	Author
The Eightfold Career Path; or Invisible Duties	James Alan Gardner
Porter's Progress	Isaac Szpindel
Catalog of Woe	Mindy L. Klasky
Ferret and Red	Josepha Sherman
A Man's Place	Eric Choi
Dancing in the Dark	Nancy Kress
The Siren Stone	Derwin Mak
Feef's House	Doranna Durgin
Attached Please Find My Novel	Sean P. Fodera
Field Trip	S. M. & Jan Stirling
Come All Ye Faithful	Robert J. Sawyer
Riggers	Michael E. Picray
Suspended Lives	Alison Sinclair
I Knew a Guy Once	Tanya Huff
