= Joël Champetier =

French-Canadian science fiction and fantasy author

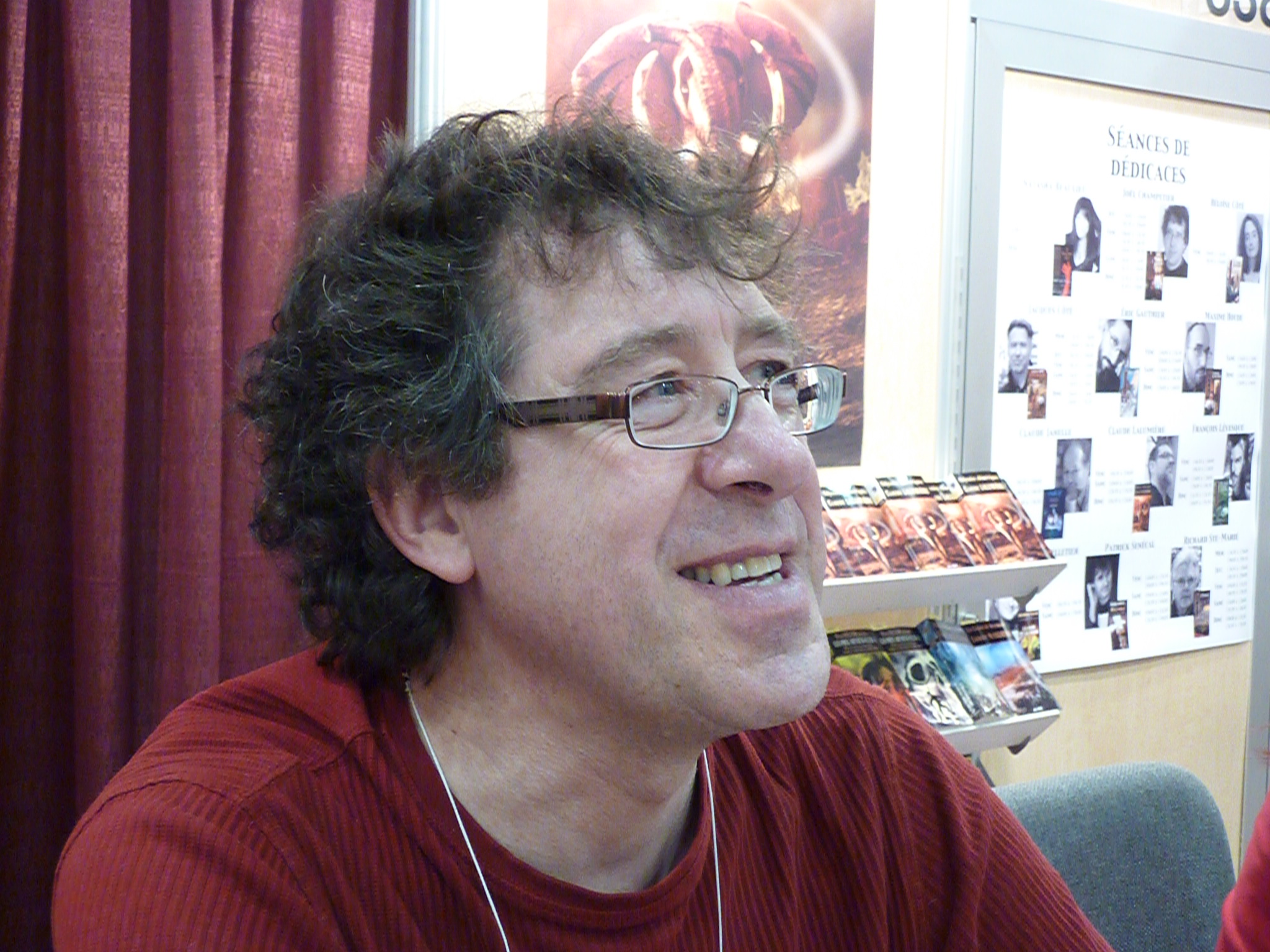
- Born: 30 November 1957; La Corne, Quebec, Canada
- Died: 30 May 2015 (aged 57); St-Tite, Quebec, Canada
- Occupation: novelist
- Writing career
- Genres: Science fiction, fantasy

Joël Champetier (30 November 1957 – 30 May 2015) was a French-Canadian science fiction and fantasy author.

== Biography ==
Born in La Corne, Quebec (Abitibi-Témiscamingue district), Champetier became a full-time writer after working in electrochemistry. Champetier's first published work, Le chemin des fleurs, appeared in Quebec science-fiction and fantasy magazine Solaris in 1981. After publishing many stories in various magazines and collections, some of which would be translated to English, Champetier first youth novel, La mer au fond du monde, was published in 1990.

La taupe et le dragon, Champetier's first adult science-fiction novel, was published in 1991. This would be translated into English and published in the United States in 1999 by Tor Books as "The Dragon's Eye". Champetier has also been published in France, such as a collection of stories through Orion, and his fantasy novel Les sources de la magie was published by Bragelonne in 2005.

Champetier also grew in status among the community of Quebec science-fiction and fantasy writers. In 1983, Champetier helped organise the Boréal Congress, an annual Quebec science-fiction conference and would serve on the conference's board of directors in 1984, and again from 1989 to 1999, becoming vice-president from 1994 to 1999.

In 1987, Champetier became a literary critic in the publication L'année de la science-fiction et du fantastique québécois (Quebec Science Fiction and Fantasy Annual).

At Solaris magazine, Champetier became a member of the editorial committee, becoming literary director from 1990 to 1994, co-ordinator from 1992 to 1996 during which the magazine won three Prix Aurora Awards. In 1995, Champetier worked with Yves Meynard on the anthology Escales sur Solaris for the magazine's anniversary.

In 1996, Champetier was honoured at the Salon du livre de l'Abitibi-Témiscaminque, for which he had been previously in charge of programming in 1991.

In 2001, he was Guest of Honour at the World Fantasy Convention.

Champetier's works, primarily represented by the novels La mémoire du lac, La peau blanche and L'aile du papillon, were often compared to the style of Stephen King by various editors.

Champetier's 1997 novel La peau blanche was adapted into a 2004 film by Daniel Roby which was released in English as White Skin.

== Death ==
Champetier died after a struggle with cancer, aged 57, on 30 May 2015, living in Saint-Séverin-de-Proulxville and was the managing editor of Solaris.

== Bibliography ==
=== Youth novels ===
- 1990: La Mer au fond du monde (Paulines, Jeunesse-pop 71) ISBN 2-89039-481-6
- 1991: La Requête de Barrad (Paulines, Jeunesse-pop 73) ISBN 2-89039-501-4
- 1991: La Prisonnière de Barrad (Paulines, Jeunesse-pop 76) ISBN 2-89039-517-0
- 1993: Le Jour-de-trop (Paulines, Jeunesse-pop 85) ISBN 2-89039-586-3
- 1993: Le Voyage de la sylvanelle (Paulines, Jeunesse-pop 88) ISBN 2-89420-202-4
- 1994: Le Secret des sylvaneaux (Paulines, Jeunesse-pop 93) ISBN 2-89420-223-7
- 1995: Le Prince Japier (Paulines, Jeunesse-pop 98) ISBN 2-89420-283-0

=== Adult novels ===
- 1991: La Taupe et le Dragon (Québec/Amérique, Littérature d'Amérique) ISBN 2-89037-548-X
  - 1999: reissue (Alire, Romans 025) ISBN 2-922145-26-3
  - 1999: English version: The Dragon's Eye (Tor) ISBN 0-312-86882-0
- 1994: La Mémoire du lac (Québec/Amérique, Sextant 3)
  - 2001: reissue (Alire, Romans 043) ISBN 2-922145-49-2
- 1995: Escales sur Solaris (anthology, with Yves Meynard, Vents d'Ouest)
- 1997: La Peau blanche (Alire, Romans 006) ISBN 2-922145-05-0
  - 2002: reissued in large size (Alire, GF 2)
- 1999: L'Aile du papillon (Alire, Romans 028) ISBN 2-922145-24-7
- 2002: Les Sources de la magie (Alire, Romans 054)
  - 2005: reissue (Bragelonne) (France)
- 2006 (scheduled): Le Voleur des steppes (Alire)
- 2006? (scheduled): L'Éblouissement (Alire)

=== Collections ===
- 1997: Cœur de fer(collection, Orion, Science-fiction) (France)

=== Articles ===
- 1981: Le chemin des fleurs (Solaris 41)
  - 1983: Reparution dans Aurores Boréales 1 (Le Préambule)
- 1982: Le nettoyage de la Compté (Pour ta belle gueule d'ahuri 5)
  - 1988: Reparution dans Épitaphe 4
- 1983: Bébé, Stan' et moi (Solaris 50)
- 1984: Elle a soif (imagine... 21)
- 1985: Poisson-soluble (Solaris 59)
  - 1985: Reparution dans Aurores Boréales 2 (Le Préambule)
  - 1987: Version anglaise : in Tesseracts 2 (Press Porcépic)
  - 1994: Reparution dans Northern Stars (Tor)
- 1987: Retour sur Colonie (Solaris 75, written with Élisabeth Vonarburg)
- 1987: Les vents du temps (Samizdat 8)
  - 1990: Version anglaise : in Tesseracts 3 (Press Porcépic)
- 1988: Survie sur Mars in L'Année de la science-fiction et du fantastique Québécois 1987 (Le Passeur)
  - 1993: reprinted in Yellow Submarine 104
  - 1997: reprinted in Cœur de fer (Orion)
- 1988: Salut Gilles! (Solaris 79)
- 1989: En petites coupures (Færie 5)
- 1989: Le jour-de-trop (Solaris 87)
- 1989: Karyotype 47, XX, +21 in Sous des soleils étrangers (Les Publications Ianus)
  - 1997: Reparution dans Cœur de fer (Orion)
- 1990: Ce que Hercule est allé faire chez Augias, et pourquoi il n'y est pas resté in L'Année de la science-fiction et du fantastique Québécois 1989 (Le Passeur)
  - 1993: reprinted in Yellow Submarine 102
  - 1997: reprinted in Cœur de fer (Orion)
- 1990: Cœur de fer (Solaris 93)
  - 1995: reprinted in Escales sur Solaris (Vents d'Ouest)
  - 1997: reprinted in Cœur de fer (Orion)
  - 1996: English version in Tesseract Q (Tesseracts Books)
- 1990: À fleur de peau (Fusion/Nouvelle Génération 6)
  - 1998: reprinted in N'Gak & Cie
- 1992: Anciennes cicatrices (imagine... 59)
  - 1997: reprinted in Panorama de la littérature québécoise (Guérin)
- 1992: Luckenbach, les mathématiques, et autres dangers de Montréal (Solaris 100)
- 1992: Petite peste in Par chemins inventés (Québec/Amérique, Clip 10)
- 1993: Dieu, 1, 0 in L'Année de la science-fiction et du fantastique Québécois 1990 (Le Passeur)
- 1994: Esclaves du sable (in Décollages, imagine...)
- 1994: Visite au comptoir dénébolien in Sourires (L'A Venir)
  - 1997: reprinted in Cœur de fer (Orion)
- 1996: Icabod Icabod Crane in La Maison douleur (Vents d'Ouest, Ado 2)
- 1997: Badelaire l'assassin in Concerto pour six voix (Médiaspaul, Jeunesse-pop 121)
- 1998: À la main (Solaris 125)
- 1998: Les Amis de la Forêt (extrait), in Roberval fantastique (Ashem fictions)
- 1998: Créatures de poussière (Horrifique 25)
- 2001: Huit Harmoniques de Lumière (Solaris 136)

== Awards and recognition ==
- 1982: Prix Boréal, Le chemin des fleurs
- 1989: Prix Casper, Survie sur Mars
- 1989: Prix Casper, Survie sur Mars
- 1991: Prix Boréal, novel, La Mer au fond du monde
- 1991: Prix Boréal, story, Cœur de fer
- 1992: Prix Boréal La Taupe et le Dragon
- 1995: Prix Aurora Award, La Mémoire du Lac
- 1995: Grand Prix de la science-fiction et du fantastique québécois (Grand Prize for Quebec Science Fiction and Fantasy), for La mémoire du lac, Le secret des sylvaneaux, Visite au comptoir dénébolien and Esclave du sable

He was also a finalist in 1984 and 1985 in a screenplay contest by Radio-Québec (today known as Télé-Québec), at Prix Québec/Wallonie-Bruxelles in 1992, and also at Prix Brive/Montréal in 1993 (for Le jour-de-trop).
