= Edo van Belkom =

Canadian author of horror fiction (born 1962)

Edo van Belkom (born 1962) is a Canadian author of horror fiction.

== Early life and education ==
Edo van Belkom was born in Toronto, Ontario, in 1962. he graduated from York University with an honors degree in creative writing. He worked as a full-time journalist for five years, first as a sports reporter at The Brampton Times from 1987 to 1990, then as a police reporter with the North York Mirror for two months, and then he had the position of assistant sports editor for the Cambridge Reporter. He re-evaluated his career and his finances and then became a full-time freelance writer in 1992. He has also taught short story writing for the Peel Board of Education, was an instructor at Sheridan College, and has lectured on horror and fantasy writing at the University of Toronto and Ryerson University.

Early in his career, he admired writers such as Kurt Vonnegut and Ray Bradbury before deciding that the horror genre was the best fit for him.

== Career ==
Van Belkom is the author of the Dragonlance setting novel Lord Soth (1997), and the novels Wyrm Wolf, Mister Magick, Teeth, Martyrs, Scream Queen, Army of the Dead and Wolf Pack, amongst others. He is also the editor of Aurora Awards: An Anthology of Prize-Winning Science Fiction (1999).

He has published about 200 stories of science fiction, fantasy, horror and mystery in such magazines as Parsec, Storyteller, On Spec and RPM, and the anthologies Northern Frights 1, 2, 3, 4, Shock Rock 2, Fear Itself, Hot Blood 4, 6, Dark Destiny, Crossing the Line, Truth Until Paradox, Alternate Tyrants (where his story "The October Crisis" was featured), The Conspiracy Filed, Brothers of the Night, Robert Bloch's Psychos, The Year's Best Horror Stories 20 and Best American Erotica 1999. His short story collection, Death Drives a Semi, which includes twenty of his stories, was published by Quarry Press in 1998. His non-fiction book, Northern Dreamers: Interviews with Famous Authors of Science Fiction, Fantasy, and Horror, published by Quarry Press in 1998, has interviews with twenty-two of the best writers in Canada. He also wrote a how-to book, Writing Horror.

He was hired as an on-air host at Scream TV in 2001.

Van Belkom has been described by the Vancouver Sun as "one of Canada's leading writers of erotica", mostly under the pseudonym Evan Hollander. He wrote the how-to book Writing Erotica (2001).

Outside of the horror genre, for several years he wrote a magazine serial for Truck News that recounts the adventures of a former private investigator who becomes a trucker.

His short story "The Rug", from the book Death Drives a Semi, was adapted into a 2025 short film, with the creative process of the filmmakers depicted in Sean Cisterna's documentary film Silver Screamers.

== Awards ==
Wyrm Wolf is a Locus bestseller and a finalist for the 1995 Bram Stoker Award for Best First Novel. In 1997, he won the Bram Stoker Award for Short Fiction from the Horror Writers Association for "Rat Food" (co-authored with David Nickle). That year van Belkom was Master of Ceremonies for the World Horror Convention. His story, "The Rug" was a 1998 Stoker finalist. He has received 19 nominations for the Aurora Awards and won three times. Other stories have twice been nominated for the Arthur Ellis Award (presented by the Crime Writers of Canada). He has also won the Ontario Library Association's Silver Birch award. In 2009 van Belkom was a Guest of Honor at the World Horror Convention.

== Personal life ==
He lives in Brampton, Ontario, with his wife Roberta and son Luke. Roberta is a librarian.

== Works ==
=== Fiction ===
- Martyrs (2001)
- Teeth (2001)
- Scream Queen (2003)
- Blood Road (2004)
- Battle Dragon (2008)

==== Dragonlance: Warriors ====
- Lord Soth (1996)

==== World of Darkness ====
- Wyrm Wolf (1995)
- Mister Magick (1998)

==== Deathlands (under the pseudonym James Axler) ====
- Skydark Spawn (2003)
- Black Harvest (2005)

==== Wolf Pack ====
- Wolf Pack (2004)
- Lone Wolf (2005)
- Cry Wolf (2007)
- Wolf Man (2008)

==== Dragon Dice ====
- Army of the Dead (2021) with Christopher D. Schmitz

==== Collections ====
- Virtual Girls: The Erotic Gems of Evan Hollander (1995, under the pseudonym Evan Hollander)
- Death Drives a Semi (1997)
- Six Inch Spikes (2001)

==== Anthologies ====
- Aurora Awards: An Anthology of Prize-Winning Science Fiction & Fantasy (1999)
- Be Afraid! (2000)
- Northern Horror (2000)
- Be Very Afraid! (2002)
- Tesseracts Ten (2006) with Robert Charles Wilson

=== Nonfiction ===
- Northern Dreamers: Interviews with Famous Science Fiction, Fantasy, and Horror Writers (1998)
- Writing Horror (2000)

== See also ==
- List of horror fiction authors
