= Women of the Apocalypse =

- Author: Eileen Bell, Roxanne Felix, Billie Milholland, Ryan T. McFadden
- Cover artist: Herman Lau
- Language: English
- Genre: Fantasy
- Publisher: Absolute XPress (an imprint of Hades Publications)
- Publication date: 29 September 2009
- Publication place: Canada
- Media type: Trade Paperback
- Pages: 242
- ISBN: 978-1-77053-000-3
- Preceded by: Seven Deadly Sins

Women of the Apocalypse is an anthology of four fantasy novellas, published in September 2009 by Absolute XPress. There is a brief framing device, in which four archangels attempt to activate four human male heroes to save the world from the Four Horsemen of the Apocalypse but mistakenly empower four women. Each novella centers around one woman's trials against one of the Horsemen. The anthology won the Prix Aurora in 2010. Cover art was by Herman Lau, while the design was by John Teeter.

== Novellas ==
- "Pawns Dreaming of Roses (Pestilence)" by Eileen Bell
- "A Choice Among No Choices (War)" by Roxanne Felix
- "Hungersnot (Famine)" by Billie Milholland
- "Dues Ex Machina (Death)" by Ryan T. McFadden

== Summary ==
=== A Simple Assignment (Framing Device) ===
Four archangels discuss how a simple assignment went so terribly wrong. The Four Horsemen of the Apocalypse are coming and so the Archangels found the perfect champions to save the world: fighters, warriors, and soldiers. These chosen champions must drink a shooter that will imbue them with divine powers to battle the Four Horsemen. A mistake is made when four random women drink the divine concoction. Alexandra Carlton, Julia Wolfe, Emily Keller and Dinah Medrano must all take up the mantles of champions.

=== Pawns Dreaming of Roses (Pestilence) ===
Alexandra Carlton, a waitress at a sports bar, inadvertently becomes the champion destined to take on the First Horseman of the Apocalypse by drinking a shooter given to her as a tip. Shortly thereafter, she meets the Archangel Raphael, who has been charged with preparing Alexandra for her quest. The story focuses on Alexandra's attempts to learn "the ways of the Horseman" in order to stop him, as increasingly erotic visions of that Horseman and Raphael's apparent reluctance to give her any useful information thwart her.

=== A Choice Among No Choices (War) ===
A refugee lawyer, Dinah Medrano, is approached by the Archangel Michael to be a champion to defend the Earth from the Apocalypse, specifically the Horseman of War. At first, Dinah is resistant to the presented challenge because she is convinced that Michael is not sane. However, when she realizes she has been granted powers to manipulate water and heal people, Dinah accepts Archangel Michael's challenge in order to save her sister, Fatima, who is suffering from cancer. The story focuses on Dinah's attempts to cease the progress of the Horseman of War, despite the complications that arise when she discovers the Horseman of War is a former angel.

=== Hungersnot (Famine) ===
After missing a day of work because of a severe hangover, Emily Keller returns to find an elderly man assigned as a trainee to the concrete truck she drives for her father's company. Arthur Capella is the name adopted by Urial, the Archangel of Music, who is tasked with persuading Emily that she is the champion who must confront and defeat the Apocalyptic Horseman, Famine. Emily, a modern young woman, living in a world of online social networking, is not easily persuaded, until she finds out that her good friend Donald, not only is the Horseman Famine, he is also responsible for killing both her mother and her mentor, Twinkie.

Famine, in this story, seeks to destroy the populations of the developed world by a devious kind of starvation caused by the dwindling nutrition in refined and convenience food.

=== Dues Ex Machina (Death) ===
Julia Wolfe is a particle scientist involved in a secret fusion project located two miles beneath the surface. The project, dubbed Eden by the members of the scientific team, is working on achieving positive fusion, a goal that could spell the end of the world's energy problems. As the project nears completion, Julia finds her personal life unraveling. From troubling dreams to dissatisfaction with her marriage, she begins question her place within Eden and wonders if she needs to leave.
However, when the fusion reactor malfunctions throwing Eden into darkness and chaos, Julia realizes they are not alone in the deep. It is up to Julia to protect them against the horsemen Death. More than their lives hang in the balance. If she fails, Death will escape from Eden and wash over the surface world.

== Illustrations ==
- Interior and Cover art by Herman Lau - 4 interior black and white illustrations, full color cover
- Design and cover layout by John Teeter
