= Daniel Sernine =

French Canadian writer (born 1955)

- Born: Alain Lortie; November 7, 1955 (age 70); Montreal, Quebec, Canada
- Writing career
- Language: French
- Genres: Science fiction, children's literature, young adult fiction

Alain Lortie, commonly known under the pseudonym Daniel Sernine, is a French Canadian writer.

== Biography ==
Sernine obtained a Bachelor's in history in 1975 and a Master's in library science in 1977, both from the University of Montréal. He dedicated himself to writing in 1975, usually science-fiction, fantasy and books for young adults. His first short stories (Jalbert and La bouteille) were published in the magazine Solaris, then called Requiem, in 1975. In 1979, he published his first novel, Organisation Argus, as well as two collections of short stories, Les Contes de l'ombre and Légendes du vieux manoir.

Sernine has published novels and collections for adults, young adults, and children, and has won multiple awards for his works. He is also credited with a hundred articles and essays dedicated to the fields of writing, publishing, astronomy, science-fiction and fantasy.

Sernine has been the literary director of the Jeunesse-Pop collection at Éditions Médiaspaul since 1983 and of Lurelu since 1991, both dedicated to children's literature, as well as a member of the editorial board of Solaris.

== Selected awards and honors ==
Year	Organization	Award title, Category	Work	Result	Refs
1977	Requiem	Prix Dagon	Exode 5	Won	
1982	Solaris	Prix Solaris	Loin des vertes prairies	Won	
1984	Canada Council for the Arts	Prix de littérature de jeunesse du Conseil des Arts du Canada	Le Cercle Violet	Won	
1986	Canadian SF and Fantasy Association	Prix Casper	Yadjine et la mort	Won	
1992	Boréal	Prix Boréal	À la recherche de Monsieur Goodtheim	Won	
1992	Boréal	Prix Boréal	Boulevard des Étoiles	Won	
1992		Grand Prix de la science-fiction et du fantastique québécois	Boulevard des Étoiles, Boulevard des Étoiles 2 : À la Recherche de Monsieur Goodtheim, Le Cercle de Khaleb and Les Rêves d'Argus	Won	
1992		Prix 12/17 Brive-Montréal	Le Cercle de Khaleb	Won	
1994	Canadian SF and Fantasy Association	Aurora Award; French novel	Chronoreg	Won	
1994	Boréal	Prix Boréal	Manuscrit trouvé dans un secrétaire	Won	
1996		Grand Prix de la science-fiction et du fantastique québécois	Sur la scène des siecles, L'Arc-en-Cercle and La Traversée de l'apprenti sorcier	Won	
