= Hades Publications =

- Status: Active
- Founded: 2000
- Founder: Brian Hades (Publisher)
- Country of origin: Canada
- Headquarters location: Calgary, Alberta
- Distribution: North America
- Fiction genres: Science fiction Fantasy; Horror
- Imprints: Absolute Xpress; Edge Science Fiction & Fantasy; Dragon Moon Press; Trickster Books
- Official website: Edgewebsite.com

Hades Publications is a publishing company owned by Brian Hades that focuses on science fiction and fantasy literature. The company publishes under four different imprints and is currently the largest dedicated Canadian publisher of science fiction and fantasy.

== History ==
Brian Hades spent a great deal of time in the performing arts prior to starting Trickster Books in 1999, a line of Books, Manuals, Manuscripts and Posters on Magic, Illusion, Conjuring and Variety Arts.

A year later he started Hades Publications and his second imprint, Edge Science Fiction and Fantasy Publishing. The vision was "to encourage, produce and promote thought-provoking and well written science fiction and fantasy literature."

In 2007, Hades Publications entered into a partnership with Red Deer-based Dragoon Moon Press. This made Hades Publications the largest dedicated Canadian publisher of Science Fiction and Fantasy. This imprint remains independent but utilizes Hades Publications distribution channels.(Announced on August 18, 2007)

In 2009, Hades Publications entered into the POD and E-book market with a new imprint Absolute XPress. It started as an all encompassing imprint publishing many different genres, but nearing the 1 year anniversary the press changed focus returning to Science Fiction, Fantasy and Horror. This imprint has been closed to submissions for over a year now (as of August 2011).

The First Book
Calgary author Marie Jakober's The Black Chalice was the first book to be published by Edge Science Fiction and Fantasy Publishing. It has won three major awards and garnered high praise from reviewers and readers alike.

== Notable authors and works ==
Edge Science Fiction and Fantasy

- Marie Jakober's The Black Chalice, published in 2000.
- The Tesseracts Anthology, now including the 23rd in the series. It contains such authors as Spider Robinson, William Gibson, Margaret Atwood and Cory Doctorow and has won the Prix Aurora Award several times.
- Throne Price by Lynda Williams was a finalist for the Foreword Magazine Book of the Year Award.

Absolute XPress

- Women of the Apocalypse, a novella collection, won two Prix Aurora Awards for Best Other Work in English, and the Novella "Pawns Dreaming of Roses" by Eileen Bell won for Best Short Form in English.

== Imprints ==
Hades Publications has four book imprints, all of which are based in Canada.

- Absolute Xpress
- Edge Science Fiction and Fantasy Publishing (includes the Award Winning Tesseracts Anthology and defunct imprint)
- Dragon Moon Press
- Trickster Books

== See also ==
- Canadian Science Fiction
