= Élisabeth Vonarburg =

Canadian writer

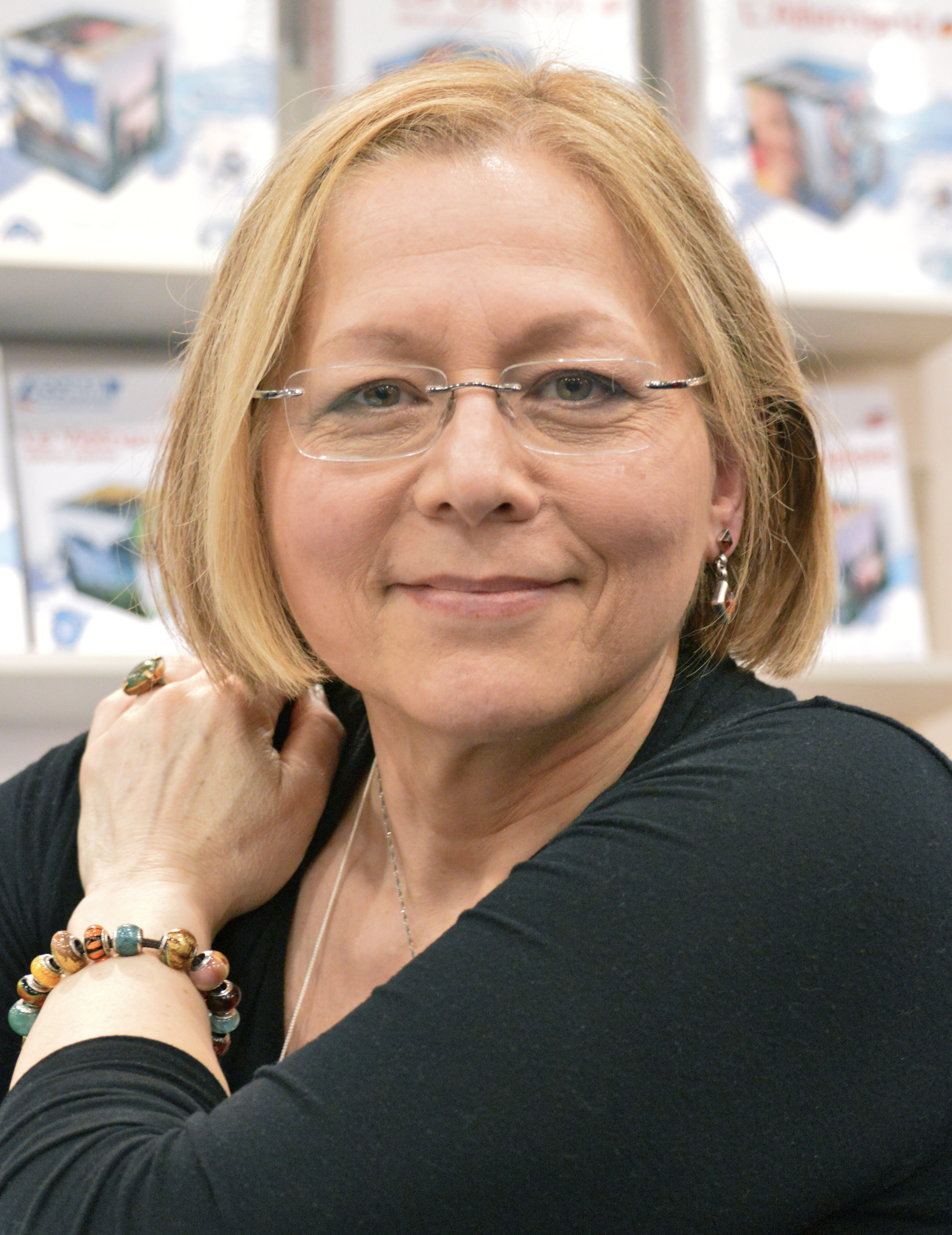
- Élisabeth Vonarburg in 2013
- Born: August 5, 1947 (age 79); Paris, France
- Occupation: Science fiction writer
- Writing career
- Period: 1980–present
- Genres: Fantasy, Historical
- Notable work: Chroniques du Pays des Mères

Élisabeth Vonarburg (born 5 August 1947) is a science fiction writer. She was born in Paris (France) and has lived in Chicoutimi (now Saguenay), Quebec, Canada since 1973.

From 1979 to 1990, she was the literary director of the French-Canadian science fiction magazine Solaris. Her first novel, Le Silence de la Cité (The Silence in the City), appeared in 1981.

She has received several awards, including "Le Grand Prix de la SF française" in 1982 and a Philip K. Dick Award special citation in 1992 for In the Mothers' Land the English version of Chroniques du pays des mères.

She is the author of Cycle de Tyranaël.

== Bibliography ==
=== Series ===
==== Maerlande ====
Original Release	Title (French)	English Release	Title (English)
1981	Le Silence de la cité	1988	The Silent City
1992	Chroniques du Pays des Mères	1992	In the Mothers' Land

==== Tyranaël ====
Original Release	Title (French)	English Release	Title (English)
1994	Contes de Tyranaël		
1996	Les rêves de la mer	2003	Dreams of the Sea
1996	Le jeu de la perfection	2005	A Game of Perfection
1997	Mon frère l'ombre		
1997	L'Autre Rivage		
1997	La Mer allée avec le soleil		

==== Reine de Mémoire ====
Original Release	Title (French)
2005	La maison d'oubli
2006	Le dragon de feu
2006	Le dragon fou
2007	La princesse de vengeance
2007	La maison d'équité

==== Les Pierres et les Roses ====
Original Release	Title (French)
2018	La voie des pierres
2018	La voie des roses
2018	La balance et le sablier

=== Other novels and story collections ===
Original Release	Title (French)	English Release	Title (English)
1980	L'Œil de la nuit		
1984	Janus	2000	most stories collected in Slow Engines of Time
1990	Ailleurs et au Japon		
1990	L'histoire de la princesse et du dragon		
1993	Les Contes de la chatte rouge		
1994	Les Voyageurs malgré eux	1995	Reluctant Voyagers
1999	Sang et pierre	2009	most stories collected in Blood Out of Stone
2003	La maison au bord de la mer		
2003	Le jeu des coquilles de Nautilus		
2013	La musique du soleil		
2014	Hôtel Olympia		

=== Anthology ===
- Tesseracts Q with Jane Brierley (1996)
