= On Spec =

Speculative fiction magazine

- OnSpec Magazine Winter 2006
- Categories: science fiction, fantasy
- Frequency: Quarterly
- Publisher: Diane Walton, Managing Editor
- Founded: 1989
- Country: Canada
- Based in: Edmonton, Alberta
- Website: onspecmag.wpcomstaging.com

On Spec is a digest-sized, perfect-bound, Canadian quarterly literary magazine publishing stories and poetry in science fiction, fantasy, and allied genres broadly grouped under the speculative fiction umbrella.

== History and profile ==
Based in Edmonton, Alberta, On Spec was founded in 1989 by a small group of Edmonton writers who joined together to form The Copper Pig Writers Society. At the time, there was no paying market for English speculative fiction in Canada (though paying markets in French did exist). On Spec is Canada's longest-running, and according to author Robert J. Sawyer, most successful, English-language magazine in the field.

Much more like a traditional small literary magazine than the mass-market-styled American science fiction digests such as Analog and Asimov's, On Spec was founded to address the frustration that English-speaking Canadian SF writers faced having to "Americanize" their stories for the existing US markets.

== Awards ==
As of 2026, On Spec has won the Aurora Award for Best Related Work 9 times (1990, 1991, 1995, 1997, 2012, 2014, 2015) and has been a finalist an additional 17 times (1994, 1998-2002, 2006, 2008-2012, 2014, 2015, 2018, 2020-2026). It was also nominated for the Hugo Award for Best Semiprozine in 2026.

== See also ==
- Science fiction magazine
- Fantasy fiction magazine
- Horror fiction magazine
- List of Canadian magazines
- Neo-opsis Science Fiction Magazine
