= Solaris (magazine) =

Canadian francophone science-fiction and fantasy magazine

- Editor: Joël Champetier
- Categories: Science fiction magazine
- Frequency: Quarterly
- Founded: 1974
- Company: Publications bénévoles des littératures de l'imaginaire inc.
- Country: Canada
- Based in: Longueuil
- ISSN: 0709-8863

Solaris is a Canadian francophone science-fiction and fantasy magazine.

Founded in 1974 in Longueuil (Québec) by Norbert Spehner, and originally known as Requiem magazine, Solaris is the oldest French language science-fiction and fantasy magazine in the world.

== History and profile ==
Solaris not only publishes established authors, but fosters the development of young francophone creators through a strong editorial direction. Mostly published and distributed in Québec, Solaris is also known in anglophone Canada, the United States and in Europe, where it is considered to be one of the most significant francophone magazines of its field.

Solaris deals in all forms of science fiction and fantasy, including horror and "weird" fiction. It publishes original material (short stories and illustrations) as well as related information, criticism, interviews and articles.

Solaris sponsors an annual literary contest, the Prix Solaris, intended to encourage new authors. The Prix Solaris is open only to Canadian authors. From 1981 to 2000, the Prix Solaris had two sides : literature and graphic novels.

Solaris aims to account for the existing richness of science fiction and fantasy, as well as to examine all emerging tendencies and new approaches. Whereas the growing popularity of the field is mostly spurred by its audio-visual representations, Solaris continues to support literary creation and reflection.

The team responsible for Solaris includes authors such as Joël Champetier (The Dragon's Eye), Yves Meynard (The Books of Knights) and Élisabeth Vonarburg (In the Mother's Land, Reluctant Voyagers, The Silent City). Through the years, Solaris has been edited by Vonarburg, Luc Pomerleau and Hugues Morin. Champetier was the managing editor until his death in 2015.

After more than twenty-five years of activity, Solaris has published nearly all significant French-Canadian science fiction and fantasy writers. Stories that have originally appeared within the pages of the magazine have gone on to win nearly a dozen Prix Aurora Awards (in addition to the eleven Auroras won by the magazine itself), almost as many Prix Boréal and a significant proportion of Grand Prix de la Science-Fiction et du Fantastique Québécois. Several of these stories can be read in the English-language anthology Tesseracts^{Q}, published by Tesseracts Books.

From 1981 to 2000, Solaris also published many graphic novels short stories (bandes dessinées), but abandoned the publication of those in 2000 because of the shrinking of its format from magazine size to book size. Many of Québec's comic book creators were published in its pages : André-Philippe Côté, Benoît Joly, Mario Giguère, Julien Poitras, Marc Pageau, Robert Julien, Laurine Spehner, Christian Vadeboncoeur, Éric Lacasse and others.

Illustrators contributing to the covers and the interior of the magazine include Bernard Duchesne, Mario Giguère, Pierre D. Lacroix, Guy England, Jean-Pierre Normand, Marc Pageau, Paul Roux, Laurine Spehner, among others.

== Awards ==
- 1989 : Prix Aurora Award best work in French (other)
- 1990 : Prix Aurora Award best work in French (other)
- 1991 : Prix Aurora Award best work in French (other)
- 1992 : Prix Aurora Award best work in French (other)
- 1993 : Prix Aurora Award best work in French (other)
- 1995 : Prix Aurora Award best work in French (other)
- 1996 : Prix Aurora Award best work in French (other)
- 1997 : Prix Aurora Award best work in French (other)
- 1998 : Prix Aurora Award best work in French (other)
- 2000 : Prix Aurora Award best work in French (other)
- 2001 : Prix Aurora Award best work in French (other)
- 2002 : Prix Aurora Award best work in French (other)
- 2004 : Prix Aurora Award best work in French (other)
- 2006 : Prix Aurora Award best work in French (other)

== See also ==
- Bande dessinée
- Canadian comics
- Canadian science fiction
- Quebec comic strips

== Bibliography and sources ==
- Solaris, by the organizational committee, page 34, in Science-fiction et fantastique Boréal 10, 1988, Congress Boréal 10 program, Chicoutimi ;
- Histoire de la bande dessinée au Québec, 2008, Mira Falardeau, VLB éditeur, Études québécoises collection, Montréal.
