= Aurora Awards for Fan Achievement =

The Aurora Awards for Fan Achievement is a section in the annual Aurora Awards which are granted by the Canadian SF and Fantasy Association and SFSF Boreal Inc. Several categories of awards for Fan Achievement have been granted over the years for both English-language and French-language fans. The first Fan Award was the Aurora Award for Fan Achievement, first granted in 1986. Since then, several categories have been created, with two still currently being given. In 2017 no awards for Fan Achievement in any anglophone categories were given.

== Aurora Award for Fan Achievement ==
This award was first granted in 1986 as a general category to recognize any fan-related works in the previous calendar year. This was discontinued in 1989, and replaced with more specific categories.

=== Winners and nominees ===
* Winners and joint winners

Year	Fan(s)	Work	Category	Publication	Ref.
1986	Garth Spencer*	Maple Leaf Rag	Fanzine	Maple Leaf Rag	
1987	Élisabeth Vonarburg*	Solaris	Fanzine	Solaris	
1987	Robert Runté	Unspecified	N/A	Unknown	
1987	Fran Skene	Unspecified	N/A	Unknown	
1988	Michael Skeet*	Maple Leaf Rag	Fanzine	Maple Leaf Rag	

== Aurora Award for the Best Fan Writing & Publications ==
An award specifically for fanzines was created in 1989, and is still an ongoing category in the Aurora Awards. It was called the Award for Best Fanzine Achievement from 1989 until 1995. In 1996 it took on the name Award for Best Fan Achievement (Fanzine) and held it until 2002, and again from 2008 until 2010. In 2003, the award was renamed the Award for Best Fan Achievement (Publication), to encompass a greater scope until 2007. In 2011, the name was changed again to the Award for Best Fan Publication. In 2008, 2011 and 2014, no award was given, due to insufficient nominees. In 2018, the award names was broadened again to the Award for Best Fan Writing and Publications.

=== Winners and nominees ===
* Winners and joint winners

Year	Fan(s)	Work	Distributor	Ref.
1989	Michael Skeet*	Maple Leaf Rag	Maple Leaf Rag	
1990	Michael Skeet*	Maple Leaf Rag	Maple Leaf Rag	
1991	Catherine Girczyc*	Neology	Neology	
1992	Larry Hancock*	Sol Rising	Friends of the Merril Collection	
1993	Karl Johanson* & John Herbert*	Under the Ozone Hole	Under the Ozone Hole	
1994	Karl Johanson* & John Herbert*	Under the Ozone Hole	Under the Ozone Hole	
1994	R. Graeme Cameron	BCSFAzine	British Columbia S.F. Association	
1994	Jean-Louis Trudel, Aaron Humphrey & Dale Sproule	Communique	Communique	
1994	Dale Spiers	Opuntia	Opuntia	
1994	Andrew Murdock	ZX	ZX	
1995	Karl Johanson* & John Herbert*	Under the Ozone Hole	Under the Ozone Hole	
1995	Michael McKenny	Bardic Runes	Bardic Runes	
1995	R. Graeme Cameron	BCSFAzine	British Columbia S.F. Association	
1995	Aaron Yorgason	From Beyond the Öort Cloud	Space-Time Continuum	
1995	Benoit Girard	The Frozen Frog	The Frozen Frog	
1996	Karl Johanson* & John Herbert*	Under the Ozone Hole	Under the Ozone Hole	
1996	R. Graeme Cameron & John C. H. Wong	BCSFAzine	British Columbia S.F. Association	
1996	Aaron Yorgason	From Beyond the Öort Cloud	Space-Time Continuum	
1996	Keith Braithwaite	Warp	MonSFFA	
1996	Chris Chartier	Warp Factor	Warp 9	
1997	Theresa Wojtasiewicz*	Sol Rising	Friends of the Merril Collection	
1997	Capucine Plourde	The Diplomatic Pouch	KIDC	
1997	Aaron Yorgason	From Beyond the Öort Cloud	Space-Time Continuum	
1997	James M. Botte, Bertrand Desbiens & Mark Lefebvre	North-Words	The Society for Canadian Content in Speculative Arts and Literature	
1997	Lionel Wagner	OSFS Statement	Ottawa Science Fiction Society	
1997	Karl Johanson & John Herbert	Under the Ozone Hole	Under the Ozone Hole	
1997	Keith Braithwaite	Warp	MonSFFA	
1998	Chris Chartier*	Warp Factor	Warp 9	
1998	Chris Chartier	A Little Enlightenment	Btfcoq	
1998	M. B. Wadsworth	OSFS Statement	Ottawa Science Fiction Society	
1998	Theresa Wojtasiewicz	Sol Rising	Friends of the Merril Collection	
1998	R. Graeme Cameron	Space Cadet Gazette	Space Cadet Gazette	
1998	Keith Braithwaite	Warp	MonSFFA	
1999	Lynda Pelley*	Warp	MonSFFA	
1999	Carol Weekes	Northern Fusion	Northern Fusion	
1999	Dale Spiers	Opuntia	Opuntia	
1999	M. B. Wadsworth	OSFS Statement	Ottawa Science Fiction Society	
1999	Theresa Wojtasiewicz	Sol Rising	Friends of the Merril Collection	
2000	Karen Bennett*	Voyageur	USS Hudson Bay & IDIC	
2000	John Mansfield	CONtract	CONtract	
2000	Bernard Reischl	Disrupter	KAG/Kanada	
2000	Joel Polowin, Dwight Williams & Sharon C. P. Fall	OSFS Statement	Ottawa Science Fiction Society	
2000	Lynda Pelley	Warp	MonSFFA	
2001	Karen Bennett*	Voyageur	USS Hudson Bay & IDIC	
2001	John C. H. Wong & Garth Spencer	BCSFAzine	British Columbia S.F. Association	
2001	Don Bassie	Newsletter for Made in Canada	Made in Canada	
2001	Lisa McGovern	The Neutral Zone Journal	S'harien SF&F Social Club	
2001	Dale Spiers	Opuntia	Opuntia	
2002	Karen Bennett* & Sharon Lowachee*	Voyageur	USS Hudson Bay & IDIC	
2002	Garth Spencer	BCSFAzine	British Columbia S.F. Association	
2002	Don Bassie	Newsletter for Made in Canada	Made in Canada	
2002	Dale Spiers	Opuntia	Opuntia	
2002	Paul Valcour	OSFS Statement	Ottawa Science Fiction Society	
2003	Don Bassie*	Newsletter for Made in Canada	Made in Canada	
2003	Pierre Luc Lafrance	Ailleurs	Ailleurs	
2003	Peggi Warner-Lalonde	Filking from C to C	Filking from C to C	
2003	Dale Spiers	Opuntia	Opuntia	
2003	Yvonne Penney	Pubnites & Other Events	Pubnites & Other Events	
2004	Don Bassie*	Newsletter for Made in Canada	Made in Canada	
2004	Salvador Dallaire	Zine-Zag	Zine-Zag	
2005	Dale Spiers*	Opuntia	Opuntia	
2005	Francis Hervieux	MensuHell	www.geocities.com/mensuhell	
2006	Garth Spencer*	The Royal Swiss Navy Gazette	www.eFanzines.com/RSNG	
2006	Mathieu Fortin	Brins d'Éternité	Brins d’éternité	
2006	IFWA	In Places Between: The Top Five Stories of The Robyn Herrington Memorial Short Story Contest 2005	www.writtenword.org/in_places_between	
2006	Francis Hervieux	MensuHell	www.geocities.com/mensuhell	
2006	Jonathan Reynolds, Guillaume Houle & Fred Proulx	Nocturne	Les Six Brumes	
2007	Guillaume Voicine*	Brins d'Éternité	Brins d’éternité	
2007	Francis Hervieux	MensuHell	www.geocities.com/mensuhell	
2007	Jonathan Reynolds, Guillaume Houle & Fred Proulx	Nocturne	Les Six Brumes	
2008	No award			
2008	Dale Spiers	Opuntia	Opuntia	
2009	Jeff Boman*	The Original Universe	The Original Universe	
2009	Guillaume Voicine	Brins d'Éternité	Brins d’éternité	
2009	François-Bernard Tremblay	Clair/Obscur	Clair/Obscur	
2009	Dale Spiers	Opuntia	Opuntia	
2010	R. Graeme Cameron*	WCFSAZine	WCFSA	
2010	Felicity Walker	BCSFAzine	BCSFA	
2010	Guillaume Voisine	Brins d'Éternité	Brins d'Éternité	
2010	Dale Spiers	Opuntia	Opuntia	
2010	Jeff Boman	The Original Universe	The Original Universe	
2011	No award?			
2012	Eileen Bell*, Ryan McFadden*, Billie Milholland* & Randy McCharles*	Bourbon and Eggnog	Bourbon and Eggnog	
2012	Felicity Walker	BCSFAzine	BCSFA	
2012	Renée Bennett	In Places Between: The Robin Herrington Memorial Short Story Contest Book	Robin Herrinton Memorial Short Story Contest	
2012	Michael Matheson	Sol Rising	Friends of the Merril Collection	
2012	R. Graeme Cameron	Space Cadet	Space Cadet	
2013	Derek Newman-Stille*	Speculating Canada	Speculating Canada	
2013	Felicity Walker	BCSFAzine	BCSFA	
2013	Taral Wayne	Broken Toys	Broken Toys	
2013	Renée Bennett	In Places Between: The Robin Herrington Memorial Short Story Contest	Robin Herrinton Memorial Short Story Contest	
2013	Michelle Carraway	Reality Skimming	Reality Skimming	
2013	R. Graeme Cameron	Space Cadet	Space Cadet	
2015	Derek Newman-Stille*	Speculating Canada	Speculating Canada	
2015	Taral Wayne	Broken Toys	Broken Toys	
2015	Johnathan Crowe	Ecdysis	Ecdysis	
2015	Yvonne Penney	Pubnites & Other Events	Pubnites	
2015	R. Graeme Cameron	Space Cadet	Space Cadet	
2016	Derek Newman-Stille*	Speculating Canada	Speculating Canada	
2016	Taral Wayne	Broken Toys	Broken Toys	
2016	Johnathan Crowe	Ecdysis	Ecdysis	
2016	Adam Shaftoe-Durrant	The Page of Reviews	The Page of Reviews	
2016	Cathy Palmer-Lister	WARP	MonSFFA	
2018	Derek Newman-Stille*	Speculating Canada	Speculating Canada	
2018	Krista D. Ball	Reflections on Community and Gender in Canadian SFF	Reflections on Community and Gender in Canadian SFF	
2018	Jennifer Desmarais	Travelling TARDIS	JenEric Designs	
2018	Ron S. Friedman	Science literacy for Science Fiction Readers and Writers	Quora	
2018	Cathy Palmer-Lister	WARP	MonSFFA	
2019	Krista D. Ball	She Wrote It But…Revisiting Joanna Russ’ “How to Suppress Women’s Writing” 35 Years Later		
2019	Adam Shaftoe	Adios Cowboy		
2019	Christina Vasilevski	Books and Tea		
2019	Derek Newman-Stille	Constructing the Future	Uncanny Magazine	
2019	Ron S. Friedman	Mars vs. Titan	Quora	
2019	Jen Desmarais	Travelling TARDIS	JenEric Designs	
2020	R. Graeme Cameron	Polar Borealis, Issues #9 to #12		
2020	R. Graeme Cameron	Weekly columns in Amazing Stories		
2020	Jen Desmarais	Travelling TARDIS	JenEric Designs	
2020	Christina Vasilevski	Books and Tea		
2020	Steve Fahnestalk	Weekly columns in Amazing Stories		
2020	Ron S. Friedman	Will Voyager 1 leave the Milky Way?	Quora	
2021	R. Graeme Cameron	Polar Borealis	Issues #13 to #16	
2021	R. Graeme Cameron	BCSFAzine	Issues #538 to #547	
2021	Jen Desmarais	Travelling TARDIS	JenEric Designs	
2021	Robert J. Sawyer	Random Musings	Issue #539 to #547 in BCSFAzine	
2021	R. Graeme Cameron	Clubhouse	weekly column in Amazing Stories Magazine	
2021	James Davis Nicoll	Young People Read Old SFF	Online	
2022	R. Graeme Cameron	Polar Borealis	Issues #17 to #20	
2022	R. Graeme Cameron	Canadian SF&F book and magazine reviews	in Amazing Stories (online)	
2022	Krista D. Ball	In Defense of the Humble Cold Plate: How the Peculiar, Distinct, and Different Enriches Fiction		
2022	Rhea E. Rose	Polar Starlight Magazine	issues #1 to #4	
2022	James Davis Nicoll	Young People Read Old SFF	Online	
2023	R. Graeme Cameron	Polar Borealis	Issues #21 to #23	
2023	Éric Desmarais	JenEric Movie Reviews	JenEric Designs	
2023	Rhea E. Rose	Polar Starlight Magazine	Issues: 5, 6, and 7	
2023	Jennifer Desmarais	The Travelling TARDIS	JenEric Designs	
2023	James Davis Nicoll	Young People Read Old SFF	Online	
2024	R. Graeme Cameron	Polar Borealis	Issues #24 to #27	
2024	Maria Haskins	Maria’s Sci-Fi, Fantasy & Horror Short Fiction Roundup		
2024	Rhea E. Rose	Polar Starlight Magazine	Issues: 8 to 12	
2024	Jennifer Desmarais	The Travelling TARDIS	JenEric Designs	
2024	James Davis Nicoll	Young People Read Old SFF	Online	
2025	Robert Runté	SF&F Book Reviews	Ottawa Review of Books	
2025	R. Graeme Cameron	Clubhouse Canadian Speculative Fiction reviews	Amazing Stories Magazine	
2025	Rhea E. Rose	Polar Starlight Magazine	Issues: 13 to 16	
2025	Derek Newman-Stille	Speculating Canada		
2025	James Davis Nicoll	James Nicoll Reviews	Online	
2026	Rhea E. Rose*	Issues 17-20	Polar Starlight Magazine	
2026	Steve Fahnestalk	Amazing Stories online columns, Numbers 405-420	Amazing Stories.com	
2026	Robert Runté	Book Reviews	The Ottawa Review of Books	
2026	Lynne Sargent	Speculative Poetry and the Hugos	Strange Horizons	
2026	James Davis Nicoll	Young People Read Old Science Fiction	online	

== Aurora Award for Best Fan Organizational ==
An award specifically for achievements in organizing conventions was created in 1989, and was an ongoing category in the Aurora Awards until 2023. In 1997 its name became Award for Best Fan Achievement (Organizational). In 2011 the name of this award changed to Award for Best Fan Organizational, with achievement left implied.

=== Winners and nominees ===
* Winners and joint winners

Year	Organizers(s)	Convention	Location	Role	Ref.
1989	Paul Valcour*	PineKone I	Ottawa	Treasurer	
1990	Alberta Speculative Fiction Association*	ConText '89	Edmonton	Group	
1991	Dave Panchyk*	SSFS & Combine 0	Regina	President & Chair	
1992	John Mansfield*	1994 WorldCon bid	Winnipeg	Chair	
1993	Adam Charlesworth*	NonCon 15	Vancouver	Unspecified	
1994	Lloyd Penney*	Ad Astra '93	Toronto	Unspecified	
1994	Annette Ing	Wilfcon	Waterloo	Unspecified	
1994	Jean-Louis Trudel	SFSF Boréal	Montréal	Unspecified	
1994	Yvonne Penney	Ad Astra '93	Toronto	Unspecified	
1994	John Gannon	KAG/Kanada	Montréal	Unspecified	
1994	Heather Ashby	Ad Astra '93	Toronto	Unspecified	
1994	Rebecca M. Senese	Space-Time Continuum	Toronto	Unspecified	
1995	Cath Jackel*	NonCon 16	Vancouver	Unspecified	
1995	Lloyd Penney	Ad Astra '94	Toronto	Unspecified	
1995	Yvonne Penney	Ad Astra '94	Toronto	Unspecified	
1995	John Mansfield	WorldCon '94	Toronto	Unspecified	
1995	Rebecca M. Senese	Space-Time Continuum	Toronto	Unspecified	
1996	Jean-Louis Trudel*	SFSF Boréal	Montréal	Unspecified	
1996	Judith Hayman	FilKONtario	Mississauga	Unspecified	
1996	Lynda Pelley	MonSFFA	Montréal	Unspecified	
1996	Capucine Plourde	KIDC	Montréal	Unspecified	
1996	Monica Winkler	Toronto Trek 9	Toronto	Unspecified	
1996	Chris Chartier	Warp 9	Montréal	Unspecified	
1996	Rebecca M. Senese	Space-Time Continuum	Toronto	Unspecified	
1997	Yvonne Penney*	SF Saturday	Toronto	Chair	
1997	Capucine Plourde	KIDC	Montréal	Unspecified	
1997	Lynda Pelley	MonSFFA	Montréal	Unspecified	
1997	Rebecca M. Senese	Space-Time Continuum	Toronto	Unspecified	
1997	Warren Huska	Toronto Trek 10	Toronto	Unspecified	
1998	Peter Halasz*	The National SF & Fantasy Society / La Societé Nationale de la S-F et du Fantastique	Unknown	Unspecified	
1998	Rebecca M. Senese	Space-Time Continuum	Toronto	Unspecified	
1998	Ann Methe	Con*cept '97	Montréal	Chair	
1998	Cindy Huckle	Primedia '97	Markham	Unspecified	
1998	Chris Chartier	Warp 9 & British Television Fanclub of Quebec	Montréal	Unspecified	
1998	Andrew Gurudata	Pharos Project	Mississauga	Unspecified	
1999	Ann Methe*	Con*cept '98	Montréal	Chair	
1999	Andrew Gurudata	Toronto Trek 12	Toronto	Programmer	
1999	Chris Chartier	Warp 9 & British Television Fanclub of Quebec	Montréal	Unspecified	
1999	Cindy Huckle	Primedia '98	Markham	Unspecified	
1999	Stephen Christian	Toronto Trek 12	Toronto	Co-Chair	
2000	Bernard Reischl*	KAG/Kanada	Montréal	Unspecified	
2000	Brian A. Davis	inCONsequential	Fredericton	Unspecified	
2000	Yvonne Penney	2003 WorldCon bid	Toronto	Unspecified	
2000	Lloyd Penney	2003 WorldCon bid	Toronto	Unspecified	
2000	Cathy Palmer-Lister	MonSFFA	Montréal	Unspecified	
2000	Ann Methe	Con*cept '99	Montréal	Chair	
2001	R. Graeme Cameron*	VCON 25 & BCSFA	Vancouver	Chair & President	
2001	Peter Johnson	USS Hudson Bay & IDIC	Toronto	Unspecified	
2001	Lloyd Penney	2003 WorldCon bid	Toronto	Unspecified	
2001	Yvonne Penney	2003 WorldCon bid	Toronto	Unspecified	
2001	Larry Hancock	2003 WorldCon bid	Toronto	Unspecified	
2002	Peter Johnson*	USS Hudson Bay & IDIC	Toronto	Unspecified	
2002	Cathy Lister-Palmer	Con*cept '01	Montréal	Chair	
2002	Bernard Reischl	MonSFFA	Montréal	Unspecified	
2002	Yvonne Penney	SF Pubnites	Toronto	Unspecified	
2002	Paul Carreau	KAG/Kanada	Montréal	Unspecified	
2003	Georgina Miles*	Toronto Trek 16	Toronto	Unspecified	
2003	Martin Miller	Toronto Trek 16	Toronto	Masquerade Co-organizer	
2003	Barb Schofield	Toronto Trek 16	Toronto	Masquerade Co-organizer	
2003	Marah Searle-Kovacevic	2003 WorldCon & USS Hudson Bay	Toronto	Committee	
2003	Joan Sherman	IDIC	Toronto	Unspecified	
2003	Brian Upward	IDIC	Toronto	Unspecified	
2004	Martin Miller*	Toronto Trek 17	Toronto	Unspecified	
2004	Joan Sherman	IDIC	Toronto	Unspecified	
2004	Roy Miles	IDIC	Toronto	Unspecified	
2004	Marah Searle-Kovacevic	2003 WorldCon & USS Hudson Bay	Toronto	Unspecified	
2004	Brian Upward	IDIC	Toronto	Unspecified	
2005	Brian Upward*	IDIC	Toronto	Unspecified	
2005	Greg Cairns	VCON 29	Vancouver	Unspecified	
2005	Rebecca M. Senese	Space-Time Continuum	Toronto	Unspecified	
2005	Joan Sherman	IDIC	Toronto	Unspecified	
2005	Roy Miles	IDIC	Toronto	Unspecified	
2006	Barbara Schofield*	Toronto Trek 19	Toronto	Masquerade Organizer	
2006	Randy McCharles	Westercon 58	Calgary	Co-chair	
2006	Roy Miles	IDIC	Toronto	Unspecified	
2006	Joan Sherman	IDIC	Toronto	Unspecified	
2006	Debbie Hodgins	Avenging Dragon Squadron of KAG/Kanada	Montréal	Unspecified	
2007	Cathy Palmer-Lister*	Con*cept '06	Montréal	Chair	
2007	Geoffrey Toop	DWIN	Nationwide	Unspecified	
2007	Debbie Hodgins	Avenging Dragon Squadron of KAG/Kanada	Montréal	Unspecified	
2007	Roy Miles	IDIC	Toronto	Unspecified	
2007	Joan Sherman	IDIC	Toronto	Unspecified	
2008	Penny Lipman*	Masquerades	Unknown	Unspecified	
2008	Geoffrey Toop	DWIN	Nationwide	Unspecified	
2008	Joan Sherman	IDIC	Toronto	Unspecified	
2008	Roy Miles	IDIC	Toronto	Unspecified	
2008	Debbie Hodgins	KAG/Kanada	Montréal	Unspecified	
2009	Randy McCharles*	World Fantasy 2008	Calgary	Chair	
2009	Renée Bennett	Robyn Herrington Memorial Short Story Contest	Nationwide	Administrator	
2009	David Simmons	Anime North 2008	Toronto	Organizer	
2009	Kim Greyson	World Fantasy 2008	Calgary	Guest liaison	
2009	Judith Hayman & Peggi Warner-Lalonde	FilKONtario 19	Mississauga	Co-chairs	
2010	David Hayman*	Filk Hall of Fame	Mississauga	Organizer	
2010	Kristin Morrell	Con-Version 25	Calgary	Programmer	
2010	Roy Miles	USS Hudson Bay Executive	Toronto	Unspecified	
2010	Renée Bennett	Con-Version 25	Calgary	In Spaces Between organizer	
2010	Robbie Bourget & René Walling	WorldCon 67	Montréal	Co-chairs	
2011	Helen Marshall* & Sandra Katsuri*	Toronto SpecFic Colloquium 2010	Toronto	Co-chairs	
2011	Andrew Gurudata	Constellation Awards 2010	Toronto	Organizer	
2011	Brent M. Jans	Pure Speculation 2010	Edmonton	Chair	
2011	Liana Kerzner	Futurecon 2010	Toronto	Chair	
2011	Alex von Thorn	SFContario 1	Toronto	Chair	
2012	Randy McCharles*	When Worlds Collide 2011	Calgary	Founder & Chair	
2012	Andrew Gurudata	Constellation Awards 2011	Toronto	Chair of the Committee	
2012	Peter Halasz	Sunburst Awards 2011	Toronto	Administrator	
2012	Helen Marshall & Sandra Katsuri	Chiaroscuro Reading Series	Toronto	Co-chairs	
2012	Alex von Thorn	SFContario 2	Toronto	Chair	
2012	Rose Wilson	VCON 36	Vancouver	Art Show Organizer	
2013	Randy McCharles*	When Worlds Collide 2012	Calgary	Chair & Programming	
2013	Evelyn Baker, Amy de Ruyte & Peter Halasz	World Fantasy 2012	Toronto	Executive committee	
2013	Andrew Gurudata	Constellation Awards 2012	Toronto	Organizer	
2013	Sandra Katsuri & Lauren Marshall	Toronto SpecFic Colloquium 2012: Beyond the Human	Toronto	Co-chairs	
2013	Helen Marshall, Sandra Katsuri & James Bambury	Chiaroscuro Reading Series	Toronto	Co-chairs	
2014	Randy McCharles*	When Worlds Collide 2013	Calgary	Chair	
2014	Evelyn Wood & Alana Otis-Wood	Ad Astra 32	Richmond Hill	Co-chairs	
2014	Samantha M. Beiko & Chadwick Ginther	Chiaroscuro Reading Series, ChiSeries	Winnipeg	Co-chairs	
2014	James Bambury & Sandra Katsuri	Chiaroscuro Reading Series, ChiSeries	Toronto	Co-chairs	
2014	Matt Moore	Chiaroscuro Reading Series, ChiSeries	Ottawa	Chair	
2014	Rose Wilson	VCON 38	Vancouver	Art Show director	
2015	Sandra Katsuri*	Chiaroscuro Reading Series	Toronto	Chair	
2015	Marie Bilodeau and Nicole Lavigne and Matt Moore	Chiaroscuro Reading Series	Ottawa	Co-chairs	
2015	Derek Künsken, Farrell McGovern, Caycee Price & Elizabeth Buchan-Kimmerly	CAN-CON 2014	Ottawa	Executives	
2015	Randy McCharles	When Worlds Collide 2014	Calgary	Chair	
2015	Alana Otis-Wood & Paul Roberts	Ad Astra 33	Richmond Hill	Co-chairs	
2016	Randy McCharles*	When Worlds Collide 2015	Calgary	Chair	
2016	Samantha M. Beiko & Chadwick Ginther	Chiaroscuro Reading Series	Winnipeg	Co-chairs	
2016	Marie Bilodeau and Derek Künsken	CAN-CON 2015	Ottawa	Executives	
2016	Marie Bilodeau and Nicole Lavigne and Matt Moore	Chiaroscuro Reading Series	Ottawa	Co-chairs	
2016	Alana Otis-Wood & Paul Roberts	Ad Astra 34	Richmond Hill	Co-chairs	
2017	Randy McCharles*	When Worlds Collide 2016	Calgary	chair	
2017	Samantha M. Beiko & Chadwick Ginther	Chiaroscuro Reading Series	Winnipeg	Co-chairs	
2017	Marie Bilodeau and Derek Künsken	CAN-CON 2016	Ottawa	Executive	
2017	Marie Bilodeau and Nicole Lavigne and Matt Moore	Chiaroscuro Reading Series	Ottawa	Co-chairs	
2017	R. Graeme Cameron	VCON 41	Surrey	Chair	
2017	Sandra Katsuri and Angela Keeley	Toronto SpecFic Colloquium 2016	Toronto	Co-chairs	
2017	Sandra Wickham	Creative Ink Festival 2016	Burnaby	Chair	
2018	Randy McCharles*	When Worlds Collide 2017	Calgary	Chair	
2018	Marie Bilodeau and Derek Künsken	CAN-CON 2017	Ottawa	Executives	
2018	Marie Bilodeau, Brandon Crilly, Nicole Lavigne, and Matt Moore	Chiaroscuro Reading Series	Ottawa	Co-chairs	
2018	Hope Nicholson	Prairie Comics Festival 2017	Winnipeg	Chair	
2018	Sandra Wickham	Creative Ink Festival 2017	Burnaby	Chair	
2019	Marie Bilodeau and Derek Künsken*	CAN-CON 2018	Ottawa		
2019	Marie Bilodeau and Nicole Lavigne and Matt Moore	Chiaroscuro Reading Series	Ottawa		
2019	Sandra Katsuri	Chiaroscuro Reading Series	Toronto		
2019	Randy McCharles	When Worlds Collide 2018			
2019	Sandra Wickham	Creative Ink Festival 2018			
2020	Marie Bilodeau and Derek Künsken*	CAN-CON 2019	Ottawa		
2020	Jen R. Albert and K. T. Bryski	Ephemera Reading Series	Toronto		
2020	Brent M. Jans	Pure Speculation Science Fiction and Fantasy Festival	Edmonton		
2020	Randy McCharles	When Worlds Collide 2019			
2020	Sandra Wickham	Creative Ink Festival 2019	Burnaby		
2021	No award				
2022	Randy McCharles*	When Worlds Collide 2020 or 2021		Chair	
2022	Jen R. Albert and K. T. Bryski	Ephemera Reading Series			
2022	Hal-Con Sci-Fi Fantasy Association	Hal-Con			
2022	Diane Lacey	World Fantasy Convention		Chair	
2022	A. E. Prevost	Argo Author Chats			

After the 2022 awards this category was merged with Fan Related Work

== Aurora Award for the Best Fan Related Work ==
An award covering other achievements not related to the other categories was created in 1989, and is still an ongoing category in the Aurora Awards. In 1997 the name of the prize became Award for Best Fan Achievement (Other). In 2011 the name changed simply to Award for Best Fan Other. In 2013 the name of the award was changed to match that of the professional award, to Award for Best Fan Related Work.

=== Winners and nominees ===
* Winners and joint winners

Year	Fan(s)	Work(s)	Category	Publisher	Ref.
1989	Robert Runté*	NCF Guide to Canadian SF	Non-Fiction	NCF	
1990	Robert Runté*	Promotion of Canadian SF	Promotion	N/A	
1991	Al Betz*	Ask Mr. Science	Journalism	BCSFAzine	
1992	David W. New*	Horizons SF	Anthology	Horizons SF	
1993	Louise Hypher*	SF2 Show	Performance	SF2 Show	
1994	Jean-Louis Trudel*	Promotion of Canadian SF	Promotion	N/A	
1994	Terry Wyatt	Contributions to Fandom	General	N/A	
1994	Heather Borean	Filking	Music	N/A	
1994	Adam Charlesworth	Reviews for Ether Patrol	Journalism	Ether Patrol	
1994	Karl Johanson	Fan Writing	Writing	N/A	
1994	Ron Sharp	Cybersquid	Internet	BBS	
1994	Larry Stewart	Contributions to Fandom	General	N/A	
1995	Catherine Donahue Girczyc*	Host of Ether Patrol	Radio	N/A	
1995	Capucine Plourde	The Diplomatic Planetary Handbook	Writing	N/A	
1995	Adam Charlesworth	Reviews for Ether Patrol	Journalism	Ether Patrol	
1995	Robert J. Sawyer	Random Musings	Non-Fiction	N/A	
1995	Larry Stewart	Entertainment	Theatre	N/A	
1995	Bob Hadji	Contributions to Fandom	General	N/A	
1996	Larry Stewart*	Entertainment	Theatre	N/A	
1996	Adam Charlesworth	Reviews for Ether Patrol	Journalism	Ether Patrol	
1996	Lou Israel*	Entertainment	Theatre	N/A	
1996	Stephanie Bedwell-Grime	Filking	Music	N/A	
1996	Lloyd Penney	Fan Writing	Writing	N/A	
1997	Lloyd Penney*	Fan Writing	Writing	N/A	
1997	Judith Hayman	Filking	Music	N/A	
1997	Larry Stewart	Entertainment	Theatre	N/A	
1997	Norbert Spehner	Bibliography of Dracula Opus 300	Non-Fiction	N/A	
1997	Capucine Plourde	Design of the KIDC website	Internet	KIDC	
1997	MonSFFA	Plant 9 from Outer Space	Unknown	MonSFFA	
1998	Larry Stewart*	Entertainment	Theatre	N/A	
1998	R. Graeme Cameron	CUFF	Charity	CUFF	
1998	Charles Mohapel	Column in Hollyweird	Journalism	Hollyweird	
1998	Lloyd Penney	Fan Writing	Writing	N/A	
1998	Gary Hilson	Canadian SF & Fantasy Resource Guide	Non-Fiction	www.connect.ab.ca/~garyh/cansfrg	
1999	Janet L. Hetherington*	60 Years of Superman Exhibit	Exhibition	Nepean Museum	
1999	Lloyd Penney	Fan Writing	Writing	N/A	
1999	Larry Stewart	Entertainment	Theatre	N/A	
1999	N/A	Moxie episode of the FedEx Files	Film	N/A	
1999	Aaron Yorgason	The Return of X the Unknown	Anthology	N/A	
2000	Don Bassie*	Made In Canada	Internet	N/A	
2000	Larry Stewart	Entertainment	Theatre	N/A	
2000	Jason Taniguchi	SF Parody Shows	Theatre	N/A	
2000	Lloyd Penney	Fan Writing	Writing	N/A	
2000	Karen Linsley & Lloyd Landa	The Road to Roswell	Music	N/A	
2001	Donna McMahon*	Book Reviews	Journalism	N/A	
2001	Garth Spencer	Fan Writing	Writing	N/A	
2001	Lloyd Penney	Fan Writing	Writing	N/A	
2001	Don Bassie	Made In Canada	Internet	N/A	
2001	Karen Linsley & Lloyd Landa	Pioneers of Mars	Music	Ares CD-Rom Magazine, v2n1, Summer 2000	
2002	Alex von Thorn*	Fan Writing	Writing	N/A	
2002	Jason Taniguchi	SF Parody Shows	Theatre	N/A	
2002	Janet L. Hetherington	Film Reviews	Journalism	N/A	
2002	Lloyd Penney	Fan Writing	Writing	N/A	
2002	Larry Stewart	Entertainment	Theatre	N/A	
2003	Jason Taniguchi*	SF Parody Shows	Theatre	N/A	
2003	Lloyd Penney	Fan Writing	Writing	N/A	
2003	Gord Rose	Masquerade MC	Music	Toronto Trek 16 & Ad Astra '02	
2003	Larry Stewart	Entertainment	Theatre	N/A	
2003	Alex von Thorn	Fan Writing	Writing	N/A	
2003	Eric Layman	Fan Writing	Writing	N/A	
2004	Eric Layman*	Fan Writing	Writing	N/A	
2004	Urban Tapestry	Filking	Music	N/A	
2004	Gord Rose	Unknown	Music	N/A	
2004	Peter de Jager	Unknown	Unknown	N/A	
2004	Larry Stewart	Entertainment	Theatre	N/A	
2005	Karen Linsley*	Filking	Music	N/A	
2005	Larry Stewart	Entertainment	Theatre	N/A	
2005	Urban Tapestry	Filking	Music	N/A	
2005	Martin Springett	Bright Weaving	Music	N/A	
2005	Don Bassie	Made In Canada	Internet	N/A	
2006	Urban Tapestry*	Filking	Music	N/A	
2006	Larry Stewart	Entertainment	Theatre	N/A	
2006	Judith Hayman	Filking	Music	N/A	
2006	Martin Springett	Filking	Music	N/A	
2006	Don Bassie	Made In Canada	Internet	N/A	
2007	Éric Gauthier*, Christian Sauvé* & Laurine Spehner*	Fractale-Framboise	Internet	www.fractale-framboise.com/	
2007	Peggi Warner-Lalonde	Filking	Music	N/A	
2007	Larry Stewart	Entertainment	Theatre	N/A	
2007	Martin Springett	Filking	Music	N/A	
2007	Lloyd Penney	Fan Writing	Writing	N/A	
2007	Judith Hayman	Filking	Music	N/A	
2008	Paul Bobbit*	The Voyageur	Anthology	N/A	
2008	Peggi Warner-Lalonde	Filking	Music	N/A	
2008	Martin Springett	Filking	Music	N/A	
2008	Larry Stewart	Master of Ceremonies	Presentation	N/A	
2008	Judith Hayman	Filking	Music	N/A	
2009	Joan Sherman*	Organizer of the Heather Dale Concert	Music	N/A	
2009	Kurt Armbruster & Ryah Deines	World Fantasy 2008 Podcasts	Podcast	N/A	
2009	Keith Braithwaite	Impulse	Journalism	MonSFFA	
2009	Jennifer Ennis	Through the Keyhole -- 25 years of Keycon Memories	Non Fiction	Keycon	
2009	Lloyd Penney	Fan Writing	Writing	N/A	
2010	Roy Badgerow*	Astronomy Lecture	Presentation	USS Hudson Bay	
2010	Lloyd Penney	Fan Writing	Writing	N/A	
2010	Ivan Dorin	Gods Anonymous	Radio	Con-Version 25	
2010	Judith Hayman & Peggi Lalonde	Filk track	Music	WorldCon 67	
2010	Tom Jeffers & Sue Posteraro	Filk concert	Music	WorldCon 67	
2011	John Mansfield* & Linda Ross Mansfield*	Conception of the Aurora Nominee Pins	Awards	Aurora Awards	
2011	Tom Jeffers	Fundraising	Charity	FilKONtario	
2011	Lloyd Penney	Fan Writing	Writing	N/A	
2012	Peter Watts*	Reality: The Ultimate Mythology lecture	Presentation	Toronto SpecFic Colloquium 2011	
2012	Taral Wayne	Art for the Canadian Fanzine Fanac Awards	Art	Canadian Fanzine Fanac Awards	
2012	Lloyd Penney	Letters of comment	Writing	N/A	
2013	Ron Friedman*	Conception and delivery of the Aurora Awards voter package	Awards	Aurora Awards	
2013	Helen Marshall	("The Book is Dead; Long Live the Book!": Some Thoughts on the Coming of eBooks lecture	Presentation	Toronto SpecFic Colloquium 2012	
2013	Michael Matheson	Can Spec Fic List	Non Fiction	Can Spec Fic List	
2013	Lloyd Penney	Fan writing	Writing	N/A	
2013	Peter Watts	Hive Minds, Mind Hives lecture	Presentation	Toronto SpecFic Colloquium 2012	
2014	Robert Runté*	Why I Read Canadian Speculative Fiction: The Social Dimension of Reading the scholar keynote address	Presentation	ACCSFF '13	
2014	R. Graeme Cameron	Weekly column in Amazing Stories Magazine	Journalism	Amazing Stories Magazine	
2014	Steve Fahnestalk	Weekly column in Amazing Stories Magazine	Journalism	Amazing Stories Magazine	
2015	Derek Newman-Stille*	Speculating, Canada	Radio	Trent Radio	
2015	R. Graeme Cameron	Weekly column in Amazing Stories Magazine	Journalism	Amazing Stories Magazine	
2015	Steve Fahnestalk	Weekly column in Amazing Stories Magazine	Journalism	Amazing Stories Magazine	
2015	Kevin B. Madison	Thunder Road Trip	Anthology	Thunder Road Trip	
2015	Lloyd Penney	Fan writing	Writing	N/A	
2016	Derek Newman-Stille*	Speculating Canada	Radio	Trent Radio	
2016	Morva Bowman & Alan Pollard	Halsway Con Concert	Music	Halsway Con	
2016	Keith Braithwaite	The Doctor and his Companion	Writing	WARP	
2016	Steve Fahnestalk	Weekly column in Amazing Stories Magazine	Journalism	Amazing Stories Magazine	
2016	Kari Maaren	Everybody Hates Elves	Music	Bandcamp & CD	
2018	Joshua Pantalleresco*	Just Joshing	Podcast	Just Joshing	
2018	Samantha M. Beiko & Claire C. Marshall	Business BFFs	Podcast	Business BFFs	
2018	Kari Maaren	Monthly Musical Performances	Music	ChiSeries (Toronto)	
2018	Kraken Not Stirred	Robots vs. Monsters	Music	CD	
2018	Steve Swanson	Poster for When Worlds Collide 2017	Art	When Worlds Collide 2017	
2019	Edward Willett*	The Worldshapers	Podcast		
2019	Samantha M. Beiko and Clare C. Marshall	Business BFFs	Podcast		
2019	Kari Maaren	ChiSeries Toronto	Music		
2019	Derek Newman-Stille	Speculating Canada	Radio		
2019	Joshua Pantalleresco	Just Joshing	Podcast		
2020	Derek Newman-Stille*	Speculating Canada	Radio		
2020	Brandon Crilly and Evan May	Broadcasts from the Wasteland	Podcast		
2020	Kari Maaren	Music on YouTube Channel	Music		
2020	Joshua Pantalleresco	Just Joshing	Podcast		
2020	Edward Willett	The Worldshapers	Podcast		
2021	Randy McCharles*	When Words Collide			
2021	Jen R. Albert and K. T. Bryski	ephemera reading series			
2021	Liz Anderson and Mark Leslie Lefebvre	2020 Aurora Awards Ceremony			
2021	Kerry C. Byrne and Terese Mason Pierre	AugurCon			
2021	Derek Newman-Stille	Speculating Canada	Radio		
2022	Brandon Crilly and Evan May*	Broadcasts from the Wasteland	Podcast		
2022	Jen Desmarais and Keladry Desmarais	"How I Taught My Dragon: Kindergarten education through genre media"			
2022	Ron S. Friedman	Sci and Sci-Fi: Connecting the public to science and technology through storytelling			
2022	Kari Maaren	The Feather and the Book: An Improvised Musical Story			
2022	Edward Willett	The Worldshapers	Podcast		
2023	Marie Bilodeau and Derek Künsken* (co-chairs)	Can*Con	Convention	Ottawa	
2023	Terese Mason Pierre, Kerry C. Byrne (co-directors) and Toria Liao (operations director)	Augurcon	Convention	online	
2023	KT Bryski and Jen R. Albert (co-chairs)	ephemera Reading Series			
2023	Randy McCharles	When Words Collide			
2023	Edward Willett	The Worldshapers Podcast	Podcast		
2024	KT Bryski and Jen R. Albert (co-chairs)	ephemera Reading Series			
2024	Jo Walton and René Walling (co-chairs)	Scintillation 4	Convention	Montreal	
2024	Mathieu Lauzon-Dicso (bookstore owner)	Sip & Read / Sip & Social @ Librairie Saga Bookstore			
2024	Randy McCharles (chair)	When Words Collide		Calgary	
2024	Edward Willett	The Worldshapers Podcast	Podcast		
2025	Sonia Urlando *	murmurstations	Podcast		
2025	Jo Walton and René Walling (co-chairs)	Scintillation 2024	Convention	Montreal	
2025	Troy Harkin and David Clink	Two Old Farts Talk Sci-Fi Podcast	Podcast		
2025	Rachel A. Rosen and David L. Clink	Wizards & Spaceships Podcast	Podcast		
2025	Edward Willett	The Worldshapers Podcast	Podcast		
2026	Marie Bilodeau and Brandon Crilly*	Can*Con	Convention	Ottawa	
2026	Jo Walton and Rene Walling	Scintillation	Convention	Montreal	
2026	Troy Harkin and David Clink	Two Old Farts Talk Sci-Fi	Podcast		
2026	Rachel A. Rosen and David L. Clink	Wizards & Spaceships	Podcast	Night Beats	
2026	Edward Willett	The Worldshapers Podcast	Podcast		

== Fanédition ==
When the Aurora Awards combined with the Boréal Awards in 2011, the previous category for French-language fan works under the Boréal Awards was continued, and the other Aurora categories became open only to English-language fans. This is currently the only category for fans under the Aurora-Boréal Awards given by the SFSF Boréal. No award was given in 2013.

=== Winners and nominees ===
* Winners and joint winners

Year	Fan(s)	Work(s)	Category	Publisher	Ref.
2011	Guillaume Voicine*	Brins d'Éternité	Publication	Brins d’éternité	
2011	Élisabeth Vonarburg*	En vol (In Flight)	Creation on site	N/A	
2012	Guillaume Voicine*	Brins d'Éternité	Publication	Brins d’éternité	
2014	Geneviève Blouin*	Le plume et le poing (The Pen and the Fist)	Blog	Le plume et le poing	
2014	Michèle Laframboise	Savante folle (Scholarly Crazy)	Blog	Savante folle	
2014	Marian Cayer	Les lectures de Prospéryne (The Lectures of Prospéryne)	Blog	Les lectures de Prospéryne	
2014	Jean-Louis Trudel	Culture des futurs (Culture of the Future)	Blog	Culture des futurs	
2015	Anne-Marie Bouthillier*	Clair/Obscur	Publication	Clair/Obscur	
2015	Geneviève Blouin*	Le plume et le poing (The Pen and the Fist)	Blog	Le plume et le poing	
2015	Michèle Laframboise	Savante folle (Scholarly Crazy)	Blog	Savante folle	
2015	Marian Cayer	Les lectures de Prospéryne (The Lectures of Prospéryne)	Blog	Les lectures de Prospéryne	
2015	Johnathan Reynolds	Aveugle (Blind)	Blog	Aveugle	
2015	Martine Vignola	La Horde Geek (The Geek Horde)	Publication	La Horde Geek	
2016	Alain Ducharme*	République du centaure (Republic of Centaurs)	Publication	République du centaure	
2016	Anne-Marie Bouthillier	Clair/Obscur	Publication	Clair/Obscur	
2016	Isabelle Lauzon	La plume volage (The Fickle Feather)	Blog	La plume volage	
2016	Johnathan Reynolds	Aveugle (Blind)	Blog	Aveugle	
2016	Martine Vignola	La Horde Geek (The Geek Horde)	Publication	La Horde Geek	
2016	Michèle Laframboise	Savante folle (Scholarly Crazy)	Blog	Savante folle	
2017	Anne-Marie Bouthillier*	Clair/Obscur	Publication	Clair/Obscur	
2017	Jean-Louis Trudel	Culture des futurs (Culture of the Future)	Blog	Culture des futurs	
2017	Martine Vignola	La Horde Geek (The Geek Horde)	Publication	La Horde Geek	
2017	Geneviève Blouin	Le plume et le poing (The Pen and the Fist)	Blog	Le plume et le poing	
2017	Michèle Laframboise	Savante folle (Scholarly Crazy)	Blog	Savante folle	
2018	Mathieu Lauzon-Dicso*	Horizons imaginaires (Imaginary Horizons)	Blog	Horizons imaginaires	
2018	Anne-Marie Bouthillier	Clair/Obscur	Publication	Clair/Obscur	
2018	Emmanuelle Cartier & Etienne Lebeuf-Daigneault	Étranges Lectures (Strange Readings)	Blog	Étranges Lectures	

== Aurora Award for Best Fan Music ==
An award specifically for achievements in filking was created in 2010, due to the high popularity of the music form at the time among the Canadian SF community, as the Award for Best Fan Filk. In 2014 this name was changed to Award for Best Fan Music, to broaden the category. In 2016, this category was discontinued and absorbed back into the Award for Best Fan Related Work.

=== Winners and nominees ===
* Winners and joint winners

Year	Filker(s)	Filk	Medium	Ref.
2011	Dave Clement* & Tom Jeffers*	Face on Mars	CD	
2011	Karen Linsley	SFContario 1 Guest of Honour	Live concert	
2011	Phil Mills	Time Traveller	Song lyrics	
2012	Phil Mills*	Body of Song-Writing Work including FAWM and 50/90	General	
2012	Stone Dragons	FilKONtario 21	Live concert	
2012	Cindy Turner	Interfilk at the OVFF	Live concert	
2013	Kari Maaren*	Body of Song-Writing Work	General	
2013	Morva Bowman & Alan Pollard	FilKONtario 22	Live concert	
2013	Deborah Linden & Errol Elumir	Songs in the Key of Geek	CD	
2013	Brooke Lunderville	International Guest of Honour at Consonance	Live concert	
2013	Peggi Warner-Lalonde	NEFilk 22 at ConCertino 2012	Live concert	
2014	Chris Hadfield*	Performance of Space Oddity	Live concert	
2014	Brooke Abbey	Writing and publishing 12 songs	General	
2014	Debs & Errol	CTRL+ALT+DUETS EP	CD	
2014	Kari Maaren	Beowulf Pulled My Arm Off	CD	
2014	Kari Maaren, Devin Melanson & Leslie Hudson	Pirate Elves in Space	CD	
2015	Kari Maaren*	Kari Maaren YouTube channel	General	
2015	Brooke Abbey	Weirdness from 2014	Bandcamp	
2015	Copy Red Leader	Crossing the Streams	CD (The Pond Studio)	
2015	Debs & Errol	OVFF	Live concert	
2015	Stone Dragons	Dream of Flying	CD (Stone Dragons Studio)	
