= 61st World Science Fiction Convention =

61st Worldcon (2003)

Torcon 3, the 61st World Science Fiction Convention
- Genre: Science fiction
- Dates: 28 August–1 September 2003
- Venue: Metro Toronto Convention Centre
- Location: Toronto, Ontario
- Country: Canada
- Organizer: Toronto World Science Fiction Convention in 2003
- Filing status: Non-profit
- Website: www.torcon.org

The 61st World Science Fiction Convention (Worldcon), also known as Torcon 3, was held from 28 August to 1 September 2003 at the Metro Toronto Convention Centre and at the Fairmont Royal York and Crowne Plaza (now the InterContinental Toronto Centre) hotels in Toronto, Ontario, Canada.

This convention was also the 2003 Canvention, and therefore presented the Prix Aurora Awards.

== Participants ==
=== Guests of Honour ===
- George R. R. Martin (pro)
- Frank Kelly Freas (artist), unable to attend due to illness
- Mike Glyer (fan)
- Spider Robinson (toastmaster)
- Robert Bloch (GoHst of honor)

=== Other notable programme participants ===
- Stephanie Bedwell-Grime
- Russell Blackford
- David Brin
- Jack L. Chalker
- Hal Clement
- John Clute
- Julie Czerneda
- Ellen Datlow
- Cory Doctorow
- Candas Jane Dorsey
- Sheila Finch
- Esther Friesner
- Neil Gaiman
- James Alan Gardner
- Elizabeth Hand
- Harry Harrison
- Nalo Hopkinson
- Tanya Huff
- James Patrick Kelly
- Ellen Klages
- Nancy Kress
- Geoffrey A. Landis
- Paul Levinson
- Jacqueline Lichtenberg
- China Miéville
- Steve Miller
- Elizabeth Moon
- Larry Niven
- Fiona Patton
- Frederik Pohl
- Terry Pratchett
- Eric Raymond
- Mike Resnick
- Robert J. Sawyer
- Stanley Schmidt
- Mark Shainblum
- Charles Stross
- Cecilia Tan
- Michelle Sagara West
- Liz Williams
- Walter Jon Williams
- Connie Willis
- Robert Charles Wilson
- Sarah Zettel

== Awards ==
The World Science Fiction Society administers and presents the Hugo Awards, the oldest and most noteworthy award for science fiction. Selection of the recipients is by vote of the Worldcon members. Categories include novels and short fiction, artwork, dramatic presentations, and various professional and fandom activities.

Other awards may be presented at Worldcon at the discretion of the individual convention committee. This has often included the national SF awards of the host country, such as the Japanese Seiun Awards as part of Nippon 2007, and the Prix Aurora Awards as part of Anticipation in 2009. The Astounding Award for Best New Writer and the Sidewise Award, though not sponsored by the Worldcon, are usually presented, as well as the Chesley Awards, the Prometheus Award, and others. In 2021, the Nommo Awards began presenting at Worldcon.

=== 2003 Hugo Awards ===
This was the first time that the "Best Dramatic Presentation, Long Form" and "Best Dramatic Presentation, Short Form" awards were presented as separate categories.

- Best Novel: Hominids by Robert J. Sawyer
- Best Novella: Coraline by Neil Gaiman
- Best Novelette: "Slow Life" by Michael Swanwick
- Best Short Story: "Falling Onto Mars" by Geoffrey A. Landis
- Best Related Book: Better to Have Loved: The Life of Judith Merril by Judith Merril and Emily Pohl-Weary
- Best Dramatic Presentation, Long Form: The Lord of the Rings: The Two Towers
- Best Dramatic Presentation, Short Form: "Conversations with Dead People", Buffy the Vampire Slayer
- Best Professional Editor: Gardner Dozois
- Best Professional Artist: Bob Eggleton
- Best Semiprozine: Locus
- Best Fanzine: Mimosa
- Best Fan Writer: David Langford
- Best Fan Artist: Sue Mason

=== Prix Aurora Awards ===
This Worldcon being also the 2003 Canvention, it awarded the Prix Aurora Awards. They are given out annually for the best Canadian science fiction and fantasy literary works, artworks, and fan activities from that year, and are awarded in both English and French.

- Best Long-Form Work in English: Permanence by Karl Schroeder
- Best Long-Form Work in French: Le Revenant de Fomalhaut by Jean-Louis Trudel
- Best Short-Form Work in English: "Ineluctable" by Robert J. Sawyer
- Best Short-Form Work in French: "La Guerre sans temps", Sylvie Bérard
- Best Work in English (other): Be VERY Afraid! by Edo van Belkom
- Artistic Achievement: Mel Vavaroutsos
- Fan Achievement (publication): Made in Canada Newsletter, webzine, edited by Don Bassie
- Fan Achievement (organizational): Georgina Miles (Toronto Trek 16)
- Fan Achievement (other): Jason Taniguchi, one-man SF parody shows

=== Other awards ===
- John W. Campbell Award for Best New Writer: Wen Spencer

== Future site selection ==
Two site selection votes were held at Torcon 3.

- Los Angeles, California won the vote for the 64th World Science Fiction Convention in 2006.
- Seattle, Washington won the vote for the 8th North American Science Fiction Convention in 2005.

=== Committee ===
- Chair: Peter Jarvis
- Vice-chair: Ken Smookler

==== Division heads ====
- Programming: Terry Fong
- Finance/Legal: Larry Hancock, Ken Smookler
- Facilities: Murray Moore
- Operations: Robbie Bourget
- Events: Kathryn Grimbly-Bethke
- Exhibits: Elaine Brennan
- Communications: Michelle Boyce
- Administration: Kent Bloom
- Member Services: Lance Sibley

==== Board of directors ====
- President: Ken Smookler
- Directors: Peter Jarvis, Larry Hancock, Murray Moore, Jody Dix, Linda Ross-Mansfield, Hope Leibowitz

==== Bid ====
- Bid Chair: Larry Hancock

== See also ==
- Hugo Award
- Science fiction
- Speculative fiction
- World Science Fiction Society
- Worldcon

Preceded by 60th World Science Fiction Convention; ConJose in San Jose, California, United States (2002)	List of Worldcons; 61st World Science Fiction Convention; Torcon 3 in Toronto, Ontario, Canada (2003)	Succeeded by 62nd World Science Fiction Convention; Noreascon 4 in Boston, Massachusetts, United States (2004)
