= VCON =

Canadian sci-fi convention held in Vancouver since 1971

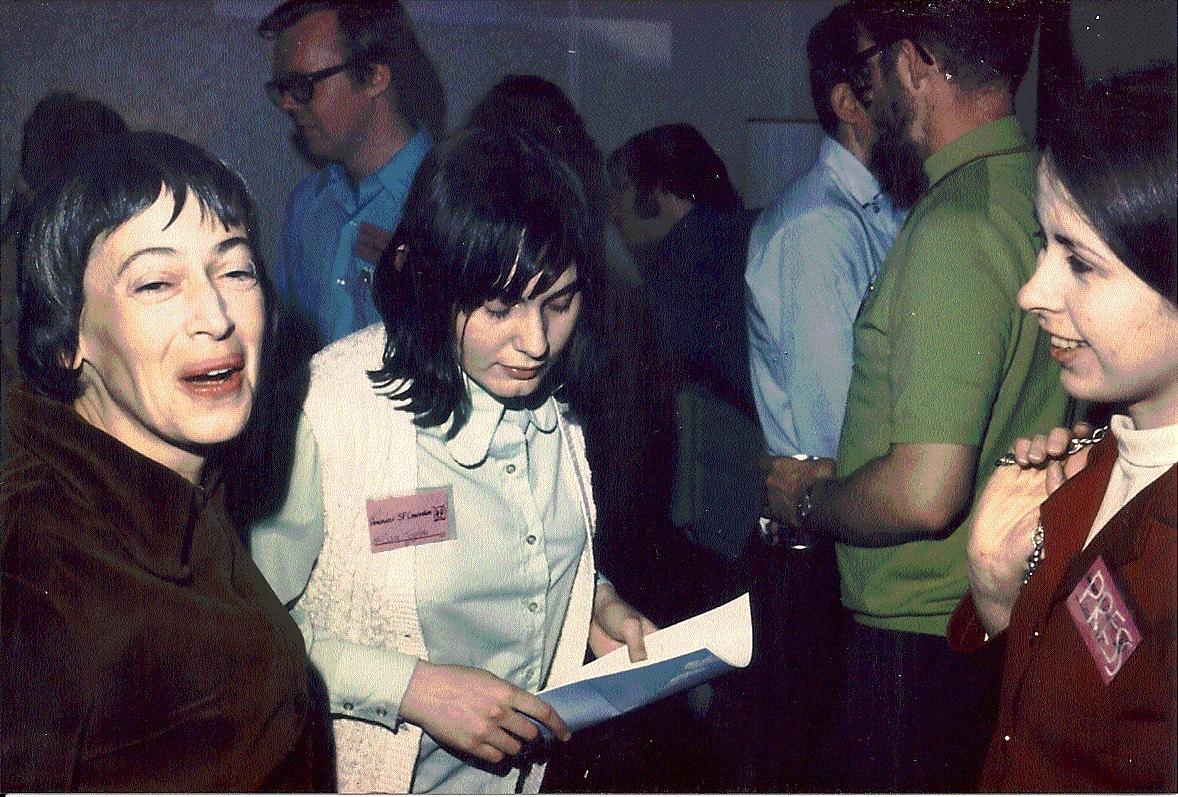
- Ursula K. Le Guin at VCON 1 in 1971.
- Status: active
- Genre: Speculative fiction, Science fiction, Fantasy, Literature, Film, Cosplay, Tabletop game, Video game
- Frequency: Annual
- Venue: 49.2827°N 123.1207°W
- Locations: Vancouver, British Columbia
- Country: Canada
- Website: http://vcon.ca/

VCON is a fan run fantasy, gaming, and science fiction convention held annually in the metro Vancouver area of British Columbia, Canada. It has been hosted by the West Coast Speculative Fiction Association (WCSFA) since 1993, and by the Western Canadian Science Fiction Convention Committee Association (WCSFCCA) before that.

== History ==
VCON is the oldest fan run science fiction convention across Canada and in the Pacific Northwest, spawning other fan run conventions in these regions (especially the Pacific Northwest) including Norwescon, OryCon, Con-Version and KeyCon. The first "VCON" (which was actually called the Vancouver SF Convention) was held April 9 and 10, 1971 at the Hotel Georgia in Vancouver with Ursula K. Le Guin as Guest of Honour. Its sponsoring organisations included the University of British Columbia Science Fiction Society (UBC SFFEN), the B.C. Science Fiction Association (an offshoot of the UBC club) and the Simon Fraser University Science Fiction Society (SF3).

Although 2021 was the 50th anniversary of the first VCON event, the event held in that year is considered VCON 43. This oddity in numbering occurred as a result of the following:

1. For several years in the mid-1990s no official VCON event was held (though it was sometimes replaced by another WCSFA sponsored event without the VCON name, such as "The Science of Murder" in 1994 and "The Science of Survival" in 1995)
2. Due to various time and resource constraints there were three VCON events that were deliberately organized to be smaller and more intimate and which were given the "half numbers" of 18½, 19½ and 41½.
3. The COVID-19 pandemic put a crimp on convention events around the world in the first part of the 2020s, and although a COVID-Friendly event was held in 2021 (the 50th anniversary of the first event), other unfortunate issues caused a second extended period without an official VCON.

As of October, 2026, VCON 44 is planned, as a one-day rebuilding step, on November 14, 2026.

VCON has hosted Canvention, Canada's national science fiction convention several times: VCON 14/Canvention 6 in 1986, VCON 26/Canvention 21 in 2001, VCON 32/Canvention 27 in 2007, and VCON 39/Canvention 34 in 2014. VCON has also hosted two Westercon, the travelling science fiction convention for Western North America, with Westercon 30/VCON 7 in 1977 and Westercon 44/VCON 19 in 1991.

== Schedule ==
VCON was traditionally a three day event held at a hotel with event space, running Friday to Sunday. The time of year when the convention was held has moved around the year over the decades, but was most recently held on the Canadian Thanksgiving long weekend (the observed Canadian Thanksgiving holiday is always the second Monday in October), with the registration desk and the member hospitality room opening at noon on Friday, programming starting in the mid-afternoon, and the event continuing until early Sunday evening.

In 2026, a one-day VCON 44 "revival" event is scheduled for Saturday, November 14 at the Burnaby Campus of the BC Institute of Technology, with registration and programming opening at 10:00 am and running until 7:30 pm.

== Features ==
Highlights include discussion panels, an art show, dealers’ tables, authors’ readings, game room, book launches, workshops, crafts, and a costume contest.

VCON traditionally featured a large art show, with original 2-D and 3-D work and prints by both professional and fan artists, as well as workshops and demonstrations by featured artists.

Tabletop Gaming was introduced to the event at VCON 5 in 1975, and starting in the 1990s, there are often also rooms devoted to console (video) gaming.

The VCON spoof award, the Elron, is presented and selected passages of science fiction are publicly read. R. Graeme Cameron, president of the British Columbia Science Fiction Association (BCSFA), has stated that the name "Elron" is not an allusion to science-fiction writer L. Ron Hubbard. The awards are reported each year in the BCSFA's science fiction fanzine BCSFAzine.

During the Turkey Readings, panelists read selections from the worst published science fiction and fantasy fiction. Volunteers act out the story being read, and artists make a poster. Audience members can bid to make the reading stop or bid higher for the reading to continue. Funds raised go to CUFF, the Canadian Unity Fan Fund.

VCON has hosted the Aurora Awards ceremony six times, most recently in 2018.

VCON has a hospitality bar, room parties, and a Dead Dog party to celebrate the end of the convention.

== Guests of Honour ==
VCON Guests of Honour
Last Name	First Name	Guest Type	VCON #	VCON Date	More Info
Abbey	Lynn	GoH	26 (Canvention 21)	2001-05-05	Lynn Abbey
Ackerman	Forrest J	Fan GoH	15	1987-05-23	Forrest J Ackerman
Alexander	Rob	Artist GoH	20	1993-05-29	Rob Alexander
Anderson	Jamie	Supermarionation GoH	41	2016-09-30	Jamie Anderson
Armstrong	Kelley	Author GoH	33	2008-10-03	Kelley Armstrong
Barr	Donna	Artist GoH	17	1989-05-27	Donna Barr
Beagle	Peter S.	Author GoH	32	2007-08-20	Peter S. Beagle
Benford	Gregory	Science GoH	37	2012-09-29	Gregory Benford
Berry	John D.	GoH	13	1985-05-25	John D. Berry
Betz	Al "Mr. Science"	Toastmaster; Fan GoH	25; 26 (Canvention 21)	2000-05-27; 2001-05-05	Al Betz
Beveridge	James	Artist GoH	35	2010-10-01	James Beveridge
Bigelow	Betty	Fan GoH; Costuming GoH	22; 26 (Canvention 21)	1997-05-26; 2001-05-05	Betty Bigelow
Bigelow	David	Costuming GoH	26 (Canvention 21)	2001-05-05	David Bigelow
Blaylock	James P.	Author GoH	27	2002-10-12	James P. Blaylock
Bloch	Robert	Author GoH	13	1985-05-25	Robert Bloch
Bova	Ben	Author GoH	10	1982-05-22	Ben Bova
Brom	Gerald	Artist GoH	27	2002 -10-12	Gerald Brom
Brust	Steven	Author GoH	22	1997-05-26	Steven Brust
Byrne	John	Author GoH	08	1980-05-24	John Byrne (comics)
Cameron	R. Graeme	Toastmaster; Fan GoH	21; 41.5	1996-05-17; 2017-10-27	Cameron R. Graeme
Carr	Terry	GoH	05	1976-05-21	Terry Carr
Charish	Kristi	Author GoH	41.5	2017-10-27	Kristi Charish, Author
Cherryh	C.J.	Author GoH	19 (Westercon 44)	1991-07-05	C. J. Cherryh
Choi	Eric	Editor GoH	40	2015-10-02	Eric Choi
Chu	Eric	Film Design GoH	41	2016-09-30	Eric Chu
Clement	Hal	Author GoH	16	1988-05-28	Hal Clement
Coney	Michael	Toastmaster	20	1993-05-29	Michael Coney
Cook	Monte	Game Design Special Guest	27	2002-10-12	Monte Cook
Cramer	John G.	Science GoH	16	1988-05-28	John G. Cramer
Crispin	A.C.	Author GoH	24	1999-05-22	A.C. Crispin
Dahm (Sledge)	Sharree	GoH	13	1985-05-25	Sharree Dahm
Dale	Heather	Music GoH	35	2010-10-01	Heather Dale
de Lint	Charles	Author GoH	20	1993-05-29	Charles de Lint
DeBrandt	Don	Author GoH	19.5	1992-05-23	Don DeBrandt
Delany	Samuel R.	Author GoH	12	1984-05-26	Samuel R. Delany
Desjardins	Shane	GoH	25	2000-05-27	Shane Desjardins
deSouza	Lar	Webcomic GoH	34	2009-10-02	Lar deSouza
Dick	Philip K.	GoH	02	1972-02-19	Philip K. Dick
Dockrey	Michelle "vixy"	Music GoH	32	2007-08-20	Michelle Dockrey
Dorsey	Candas Jane	Canvention GoH	26 (Canvention 21)	2001-05-05	Candas Jane Dorsey
Duncan	Dave	Author GoH; Author GoH	18; 29	1990-05-26; 2004-10-08	Dave Duncan (writer)
Duncan	Melissa Mary	Canvention Artist GoH	39 (Canvention 34)	2014-10-03	Melissa Mary Duncan
Dyson	George	Science GoH	26 (Canvention 21)	2001-05-05	George Dyson (science historian)
El-Mohtar	Amal	Canvention Author GoH	42 (Canvention 38)	2018-10-05	Amal El-Mohtar
Ernest	James	Gaming GoH; Game Design Special Guest	26 (Canvention 21); 27	2001-05-04; 2002-10-11	James Ernest
Fabris	Tony	Music GoH	32	2007-08-20	Tony Fabris
Fahnestalk	Lynne Taylor	Artist GoH	30	2005-10-08	Lynne Taylor Fahnestalk
Fahnestalk	Steve	Toastmaster; Toastmaster	19 (Westercon 44); 36	1991-07-05; 2011-09-30	Steve Fahnestalk
Finkbiner	Beth	GoH	14 (Canvention 6)	1986-05-24	Beth Finkbiner
Finkbiner	Mike	GoH	14 (Canvention 6)	1986-05-24	Mike Finkbiner
Forty	Steve	Fan GoH	40	2015-10-02	Steve Forty
Friesner	Esther	Author GoH	28	2003-10-11	Esther Friesner
Gajdecki	John	Media GoH	27	2002-10-12	Gajdecki Visual Effects
Gerrold	David	Author GoH	23	1998-05-16	David Gerrold
Gibson	William	Author GoH; Fan GoH	19 (Westercon 44); 21	1991-07-05; 1996-05-18	William Gibson
Giguère	Georges	—	—	—	see Guerin, Shae
Green	Nancie	Artist GoH	41.5	2017-10-27	Nancie Green
Greenwood	Ed	Game Design GoH	40	2015-10-02	Ed Greenwood
Guerin	Shae	Toastmaster	11	1983-05-20	Shae Guerin
Gustafson	Jon	Author GoH	09	1981-05-23	Jon Gustafson
Haber	Karen	Author GoH	30	2005-10-08	Karen Haber
Haldeman	Joe	Author GoH	40	2015-10-02	Joe_Haldeman
Hambly	Barbara	Author GoH	30	2005-10-08	Barbara Hambly
Heard	Bruce	Game Design GoH	39 (Canvention 34)	2014-10-03	Bruce Heard
Hendricks	Aaron	Podcasting Special Guest	34	2009-10-02	Hendricks
Hiebner	Constantine	GoH	18.5	1991-02-16; 1991-02-16	Constantine Hiebner
Herbert	Frank	GoH; GoH; GoH	03; 07; 11	1973-02-22; 1979-05-25; 1983-05-20	Frank Herbert
Hogan	James P.	Author GoH	16	1988-05-27	James P. Hogan (writer)
Hopkinson	Nalo	Author GoH	28	2003-10-11	Nalo Hopkinson
Horner	Ellipsis	Canvention Author GoH	39 (Canvention 34)	2014-10-03	Goblins (webcomic) (as Tarol Hunt)
Howes	Catherine	GoH	14 (Canvention 6)	1986-05-24	Catherine Howes
Huff	Tanya	Author GoH	33	2008-10-03	Tanya Huff
Hughes	Matt	Author GoH	32	2007-10-20	Matt Hughes (writer)
Hunt	Tarol	—	—	—	see Horner, Ellipsis
Hyde	Stan	Artist GoH; Godzilla Fan GoH	22; 41	1997-05-26; 2016-09-30	Stan Hyde
Jackson	Michael	Media GoH	23	1998-05-16	Michael Jackson (actor)
Jackson	Steve	Gaming GoH	19 (Westercon 44)	1991-07-05	Steve Jackson (US game designer)
Johanson	Karl	Editor GoH	41	2016-09-30	Karl Johanson
Johanson	Stephanie	Art Director GoH	41	2016-09-30	Stephanie Johanson
Kare	Jordin	Science GoH	28	2003-10-11	Jordin Kare
Kaufmann	Jerry	GoH	19 (Westercon 44)	1991-07-05	
Kernaghan	Eileen	Special Guest; Author GoH	14 (Canvention 6); 18.5	1986-05-24; 1991-02-16	Eileen Kernaghan
King	Matt Yang	Podcasting Special Guest	34	2009-10-02	Matthew Yang King
Kleinbergen	Adrian	Artist GoH	28	2003-10-11	Adrian Kleinbergen
Kovalic	John	Artist GoH	38	2013-10-04	John Kovalic
Lafferty	Mur	Author/Podcasting GoH	38	2013-10-04	Mur Lafferty
Lassek	Lisa	Media GoH	36	2011-09-30	Lisa Lassek
Le Guin	Ursula K.	GoH	01	1971-10-3	Ursula K. Le Guin
Lockwood	Todd	Artist GoH; Special Guest	29; 30	2004-10-08; 2005-10-08	Todd Lockwood
Lynn	Elizabeth A.	Author GoH	18	1990-05-26	Elizabeth A. Lynn
Mackenzie	Ashley	Artist GoH	42 (Canvention 38)	2018-10-05	Ashley Mackenzie
McCharles	Randy	Fan GoH	30	2005-10-08	
McIntyre	Vonda	GoH	09	1981-05-23	Vonda McIntyre
Marshall	Don	Podcasting Special Guest	34	2009-10-02	GeeksOn Podcast
Matthews	Jaymie	Science GoH; Science GoH	29; 33	2004-10-08; 2008-10-03	MOST Satellite; Goodwill Moon Rock History
Mattingly	David B.	Artist GoH	39 (Canvention 34)	2014-10-03	David Burroughs Mattingly
Metzger	George	Artist GoH	08	1980-05-24	George Metzger (artist)
Moskowitz	Sam	Fan GoH	15	1987-05-23	Sam Moskowitz
Ng	James	Artist GoH	37	2012-09-29	James Ng Art
Nicholson	Ryan	Media GoH	27	2002-10-12	Ryan Nicholson
Nielsen Hayden	Patrick	Editor GoH	19 (Westercon 44)	1991-07-05	Patrick Nielsen Hayden
Nielsen Hayden	Teresa	Editor GoH	19 (Westercon 44)	1991-07-05	Teresa Nielsen Hayden
Niven	Larry	GoH; Author GoH	05; 36	1976-05-21; 2011-09-30	Larry Niven
Normand	Jean-Pierre	Artist GoH	36	2011-09-30	
Notkin	Debbie	GoH	12	1984-05-26	
Oddsson	Warren	Artist GoH	19 (Westercon 44)	1991-07-05	
Penney	Lloyd	Filk GoH	25	2000-05-27	
Penney	Yvonne	Filk GoH	25	2000-05-27	
Pohl	Frederik	Author GoH	14 (Canvention 6)	1986-05-24	Frederik Pohl
Powers	Tim	Author GoH	27	2002-10-12	Tim Powers
Priest	Cherie	Author GoH	35	2010-10-01	Cherie Priest
Raupp	Roger	Artist GoH	18	1990-05-26	Roger Raupp
Reichardt	Randy	GoH	14 (Canvention 6)	1986-05-24	
Robinson	Frank M.	Author GoH	12	1984-05-26	Frank M. Robinson
Robinson	Jeanne	Author GoH	17	1989-05-27	Jeanne Robinson
Robinson	Kim Stanley	Author GoH	21	1996-05-18	Kim Stanley Robinson
Robinson	Peter	Podcasting Special Guest	34	2009-10-02	GeeksOn Podcast
Robinson	Spider	Author GoH; Toastmaster	17; 41	1989-05-27; 2016-09-30	Spider Robinson
Rothfuss	Patrick	Author GoH	33	2008-10-03	Patrick Rothfuss
Runté	Robert	GoH	10	1982-05-22	
Sawyer	Robert J.	Author GoH; Toastmaster; Author GoH	25; 26 (Canvention 21); 41	2000-05-27; 2001-05-05; 2016-09-30	Robert J. Sawyer
Scarborough	Elizabeth Ann	Author GoH	18	1990-05-26	Elizabeth Ann Scarborough
Schomburg	Alex	Artist GoH	15	1987-05-23	Alex Schomburg
Segal	Thyrza	Artist GoH	38	2013-10-04	Thyrza Segal
Shaw	Bob	Author GoH	17	1989-05-27	Bob Shaw
Sheckley	Robert	Author GoH	17	1989-05-27	Robert Sheckley
Silverberg	Robert	GoH; Author GoH	04; 30	1972-02-21; 2005-09-30	Robert Silverberg
Singer	Jon	GoH	09	1981-05-23	
Sledge	Sharree	—	—	—	see Dahm, Sharree
Smedman	Lisa	Gaming GoH; Gaming Special Guest	29; 32	2004-10-08; 2007-08-20	Lisa Smedman
Smith Trestrail	Verna	GoH	19 (Westercon 44)	1991-07-05	
Snellings	Lisa	Artist GoH	33	2008-10-03	
Sohmer	Ryan	Webcomic GoH	34	2009-10-02	Ryan Sohmer
Springett	Martin	Artist GoH	32	2007-08-20	Martin Springett
Sternback	Rick	Artist GoH	40	2015-10-02	Rick_Sternbach
Stross	Charles	Author GoH	42 (Canvention 38)	2018-10-05	Charles Stross
Teves	Miles	Artist GoH	34	2009-10-02	Miles Teves
Tompkins	Suzanne	GoH	19 (Westercon 44)	1991-07-05	
Turner	Pat	Artist GoH	26 (Canvention 21)	2001-05-04	Pat Turner Art & Illustration Studios
Tweet	Jonathan	Game Design Special Guest	27	2002 -10-12	Jonathan Tweet
van Vogt	A. E.	GoH	06	1978	A. E. van Vogt
Vance	Jack	GoH	07	1979-05-25	Jack Vance
Walsh	Michael	Toastmaster; Toastmaster; Toastmaster; Toastmaster; Fan GoH; Toastmaster	10; 13; 15; 30; 31; 32	1982-05-22; 1985-05-25; 1987-05-23; 2005-10-08; 2006; 2007-08-20	Michael Walsh (film critic)
Warren	Bill	Fan GoH	11	1983-05-20	Bill Warren (film historian and critic)
Warren	Elizabeth	Fan GoH	11	1983-05-20	
Weber	David	Author GoH	39 (Canvention 34)	2014-10-03	David Weber
Wells	Dan	Author/Podcaster GoH	38	2013-10-04	Dan Wells (author)
White	Ted	GoH	08	1980-05-24	Ted White (author)
Wickham	Sandra	Toastmaster	39 (Canvention 34)	2014-10-03	Sandra Wickham, Author
Willes	Christine	Media GoH	34	2009-10-02	Christine Willes
Willis	Connie	Author GoH	37	2012-09-29	Connie Willis
Wood	Susan	Fan GoH	06	1978	Susan Wood (science fiction)
Zelazny	Roger	GoH	08	1980-05-24	Roger Zelazny

== See also ==
- Science fiction fandom
- Fantasy fandom
- Fan convention
- Gaming convention
- List of science fiction conventions
- Canadian science fiction
