= Michael Walsh (film critic) =

Canadian film critic (1945–2024)

Michael James Walsh
- Born: January 6, 1945; Toronto, Ontario, Canada
- Died: January 3, 2024 (aged 78)
- Education: University of Toronto
- Occupations: Film critic; journalist; film historian; author
- Years active: 1967–2010

Michael James Walsh (January 6, 1945 – January 3, 2024) was a Canadian film critic and print journalist. In addition to newspapering, Walsh has been a broadcaster and public speaker, published works of film history and run for a seat in Canada's Parliament. Walsh died on January 3, 2024, at the age of 78.

== Journalism ==
In April 1969, following his graduation from the University of Toronto (1968), Walsh joined the editorial staff of The Province in Vancouver, British Columbia, as a copy editor and entertainment features writer. In 1972, he became its movie columnist, occupying that position until 1995. Within a year of becoming a full-time film critic, Walsh was being cited as "the city's best movie reviewer." In addition to contributing articles to Vancouver-based magazines B.C. Business Week (1978–79), Influential Business (1980–81) and Plus (1987–88), he served as B.C. correspondent to U.S. show business weekly Variety (magazine) (1978–1982). From 1995 until his retirement in 2010, he worked as production and design editor in The Province Money (finance) department.

In October 2013, Walsh launched Reeling Back: Everything Old Is News Again, a website designed as an archive of his extensive film journalism.

== Broadcasting ==
While covering film for The Province, Walsh made weekly television appearances reviewing movies on The Vancouver Show, CKVU-TV (1976), and The 10 A.M. Show on BCTV (1977–79). Later, he participated as a co-host and interviewer on the weekly Arts Rational, broadcast on Vancouver's CFRO Radio (1999–2008).

== Court appearances ==
Between 1972 and 1983, years of change in the arts and in society, Walsh made four court appearances in defence of free expression. In 1972, when obscenity charges were brought against a Vancouver East-Side after-hours club that featured nude dancers (R. v. Cafe Kobenhavn), he was sworn as an expert witness on contemporary community standards. Presiding Judge David Moffett dismissed all charges. In 1974, a downtown club faced similar charges (R. v. Gary Taylor's Show Lounge). Again the judge on the case, Jack McGivern, found for the defence. In 1981, Walsh testified on behalf of the motion picture Caligula (film) in Edmonton, Alberta (R. v. Towne Cinemas Ltd.) and in 1983, defended four sexually-explicit feature films released on video (R. v. Red Hot Video Ltd.) in Victoria, B.C.

== Politics ==
In 1998, Walsh joined the now defunct Progressive Conservative Party of Canada (PC Party) to support the leadership bid of Saskatchewan political activist David Orchard. Walsh became a director of the PC party's Vancouver East Riding Association and was its candidate during the 2000 federal election. Running as "a Red Tory with a Green agenda," he finished fourth in a field of 10 candidates.

== Science-fiction fandom ==
His reporting on the first Vancouver SF Convention (1971) introduced Walsh to what would become a lifelong association with the British Columbia fan community. He covered the second through fourth VCONs (1972–75) for The Province, thereafter attending as a panelist and program participant. He was the event's toastmaster on six occasions (1982, 1985, 1987, 2006, 2007, and 2008) and chaired Canvention (the Prix Aurora Awards) in 2006.

== Bibliography ==
In a natural progression from his film journalism, Walsh has chronicled B.C. and Canadian film history for publication in book form.

- "Vancouver Films" in The Vancouver Book – 1976 (ISBN 978-0888940841)
- The Canadian Movie Quiz Book – 1979 (ISBN 978-0772300218)
- "Movies Made In Greater Vancouver" in The Greater Vancouver Book: An Urban Encyclopedia – 1997 (ISBN 978-1896846002)
- "Filmmaking Industry" in Encyclopedia of British Columbia – 2000 (ISBN 978-1550172003)
