= Con-Version =

Annual science fiction and fantasy convention hosting a number of authors

- Status: Inactive
- Genre: Science fiction
- Locations: Calgary, Alberta
- Country: Canada
- Inaugurated: 1984
- Most recent: 2010
- Attendance: Approximately 300 to 500 Weekend Admissions
- Website: www.con-version.org (Wayback Machine Archive)

Con-Version was an annual science fiction and fantasy convention held in Calgary, Alberta, Canada. Since its beginning in 1984, the convention hosted many authors such as Robert J. Sawyer, Larry Niven, and J. Michael Straczynski; it also hosted the judging for the Robyn Herrington Memorial Short Story Competition.. Appearances had also been made by Jeremy Bulloch and Dirk Benedict.

Con-Version held programming on the Friday, Saturday, and Sunday in the form of panels, both round table and instructional, based on all areas of science fiction, fantasy, and horror. There was a costume contest, masquerade, con-suite, dance, art show and auction, gaming, and vendors room. Con-Version focused on all aspects of the genre, from the written word to art and graphics, and from big screen and television to costuming.

In recent years, a musical performed by members of IFWA, the Imaginative Fiction Writers Association, had been a fixture. In 1996, Con-Version was the Canvention—the Canadian National Science Fiction Convention, at which the Prix Aurora Awards were presented. In 2002, Con-Version was again also CanVention but also ConSpec. In 2005, Con-Version held a mini-convention, Con-Version 21.5, in conjunction with that year's Westercon, which was also in Calgary.

The convention originally started when a group of those that were running Non-Con own con "version".

The convention was originally held on the third weekend of July. This happened from Con-Version One till 16. At Con-Version 17 it moved to the third weekend of August.

After previously cancelling their 2011 event, the group cancelled its 2012 convention and all foreseeable future events in September 2011.

== Con-Version Conference Areas ==
- Con-Suite - hospitality suite, where delegates could meet each other, socialize, and get a drink. This was usually a licensed room.
- Masquerade/Costume Contest - costumers and cosplayers would dress in costumes throughout the con but this would be the one event where they showed them off and were judged and competed for prizes.
- Dance - the costume contest was typically followed by a large dance.
- Slave Auction - this only ran in the later years and typically was a fundraising event
- IFWA Writer's Workshop (Imaginative Fiction Writers Association)- the weekend prior to the conference there would be a writer's workshop that was held at another location. This also contained a short story writing contest.
- Programming panels to discuss SF, science and other activities.
- 24 hour video room - a room that showed various SF films and movies throughout the weekend of the conference.
- Dealers room - a large part of the con was a room where various vendors and dealers of SF goods would have tables to sell their wares.
- Art Show - usually adjoining the dealers room.

== Convention History ==
Guest(s) of Honour = GoH

- Con-Version 26 (Quality Inn Airport - October 15–17, 2010): Guests of Honour: Robert Picardo, John de Lancie, Marina Sirtis, Ethan Phillips, Chase Masterson, David B. Coe, Sean Cummings, Heroincredible, the 404s., Derek France - Chair
- Con-Version 25 (The Metropolitan Centre - August 21–23, 2009): Guests of Honour - Terry Brooks, Tanya Huff, Derek France - Chair
- Con-Version 24 (Calgary Radisson Airport - August 15–17, 2008): Guests of Honour - Timothy Zahn, K. A. Bedford, Jennie Breeden, Lynda Williams. Ghost of Honour - Gary Gygax, Morgan Duford - Chair
- CV 23, 2007 - Radisson/ Clarion Hotel and Conference Centre,

Jack McDevitt - GoH, Rebecca Bradley - Science GoH, EDGE - Guest Publisher, Kirstin Morrell - Chair

- CV 22 - 2006 - Best Western Hospitality Inn,

Larry Niven - GoH, David Weber - Author Guest, R.Scott Baker - Author Guest, Derek France, Raelyn MacKay - Chairs.

- CV XXI ½ - 2005- The Westin Hotel (will be part of Westercon 58: Due North, Western North America Regional SFF Convention, first weekend of July),

Mini-Con Guests:, Robert J. Sawyer - GoH, Karen Sim- Artist GoH, Phil Bacon- Fan GoH, Paul Bushell- Fan GoH, Derek France- Chair.

Westercon 58 Guests: SM Stirling- Author GoH, Mark Ferrari- Artist GoH, Cliff and Eileen Samuels- Fan GoH, Dave Duncan- Canadian Author GoH, Tom Doherty (TOR) - Publisher GoH, David Hartwell (TOR) - Editor GoH, Dr. Phil Currie- Science GoH, Randy McCharles, John Mansfield- Co-Chairs

- CV XXI- 2004- The Westin Hotel,

George RR Martin- GoH, James Beveridge- Artist GoH, Spider Robinson and Jeanne Robinson- Canadian GoH, The Arrogant Worms- Special guests, Lisa Reinhardt- Chair

- CV XX- 2003- The Westin Hotel,

Terry Brooks- GoH, Writers Workshop, Tania Diatalevi-Hodges- Artist GoH, Robert J. Sawyer- Canadian GoH - Special Guest, Dr. Phil Currie- Science GoH, Esther Friesner- Toastmaster, Lisa Reinhardt- Chair

- CV XIX/ Can-Vention 22/ ConSpec 2002- 2002- The Metropolitan Centre,

Guy Gavriel Kay- GoH, Lar deSouza- Artist GoH, James Alan Gardner- Canadian GoH, Geoffrey A. Landis- Science Guest, Robert J. Sawyer- Toastmaster, ConSpec Guests: Allan Steele, Michael Bishop, Peter Watts, Jeff de Boer, Paul Bushell- Chair

- CV XVIII- 2001- The Metropolitan Centre,

David Drake - GoH, Jean-Pierre Normand - Artist GoH, Dr. Bill Brooks - Science Guest, Cliff Samuels- Toastmaster, Dirk Benedict- Special Media Guest, Patrick Sweson and Honna Swenson- Writers Workshop Guests, Paul Bushell- Chair

- CV XVII- 2000- The Metropolitan Centre,

Mike Resnick - GoH, Julia Lacquement - Artist GoH, Candas Jane Dorsey - Canadian GoH, Thor Osborn - Science Guest, Mike Dale - Media Guest, Michael McAdam - Toastmaster/ Fan GoH, Paul Bushell- Chair

Moves to the third weekend of August.

- CV XVI- 1999- Carriage House Inn,

Ben Bova - GoH, Tanya Huff - Canadian Guest, Gregory Bennett - Science Guest, L.E.Modesett Jr. - Special Fantasy Guest, Brenna Toblan- Chair

- CV XV- 1998- Coast Plaza Inn (Marlborough),

Joe Haldeman - GoH, J. Michael Straczynski - Special Guest, Bridget Landry - Science Guest, Clifford Samuels - Master of Ceremonies, Dr. Phil Currie - Science Guest, J. Brian Clarke - Canadian Guest, Dave Duncan - Canadian Guest, Brenna Toblan - Chair (?)

- CV XIV- 1997- Carriage House Inn,

Kim Stanley Robinson - GoH, Connie Willis - Toastmaster, Robert J. Sawyer - Canadian Guest, Chair - unknown

- CV XIII/ Can-Vention 16- 1996- Coast Plaza Inn (Marlborough),

C. J. Cherryh - GoH, Mel Gildon - Toastmaster, Elisabeth Vonarburg - Canadian Guest, Dr. Phil Currie - Science Guest, Robert J. Sawyer - IFWA (writers workshop) Guest, Gary Frei- Chair

- CV XII- 1995- Glenmore Inn,

Lois McMaster Bujold - GoH, Greg Bear - Toastmaster, Len Wein - Comic Author Guest, Bruce Hallenback - Media, Veronica Carlson - Hammer Films, Ryah Deines - Chair

- CV XI- 1994- Marlborough Inn,

Frederik Pohl - GoH, David Gerrold - Toastmaster, Sean Russell - Canadian Guest, Dr. Phil Currie - Science Guest,

- CV X- 1993- Marlborough Inn,

L. Sprague de Camp and Catherine Crook de Camp - GoH, Ed Bryant - Toastmaster, Ken Macklin - Artist Guest, Dave Duncan - Canadian Guest

- CV IX- 1992- Westin Hotel,

David Brin - GoH, Peter David - Toastmaster, Michael Coney - Canadian Guest

- CV VIII- 1991- Westin Hotel,

Stephen R. Donaldson - GoH, George R.R. Martin - Toastmaster, Dean Ing - Writers Workshop Guest, J. Brian Clarke - Special Guest, Leslie Gadallah - Canadian Guest, Real Musgrave - Artist Guest

- CV VII/ Can-Vention 10- 1990- Westin Hotel,

Jack Vance - GoH, Mike Resnick - Toastmaster, Spider Robinson and Jeanne Robinson - Canadian Guests, William Hartmann - Science Guest

- CV VI- 1989- Westin Hotel,

Harry Harrison - GoH, Barry Longyear - Toastmaster, Guy Gavriel Kay - Canadian Guest

- CV V- 1988- Carriage House Inn,

Robert Silverberg - GoH, Karen Haber Silverberg - GoH, Ed Bryant - Toastmaster, William Gibson - Canadian Guest, Crawford Killian - Writers Workshop Guest, L. Sprague de Camp and Catherine Crook de Camp - Special Guests, Patricia Rose Deignan - Industrial Light & Magic - Media

- CV IV- 1987- Carriage House Inn,

Joan Vinge - GoH, Jim Frenkel - Toastmaster, Jack Williamson - Special Guest, Crawford Killian - Canadian Guest

- CV III- 1986- Carriage House Inn,

Jack L. Chalker - GoH, Phyllis Gotlieb - Toastmaster, Mike Grell - Comic Guest, Julia Lacquement - Comic Guest, Bjo Trimble - Fan Guest, Sonni Cooper - Fan Guest

- CV II- 1985- Carriage House Inn,

Poul Anderson and Karen Anderson - GoH, Frank M. Robinson - Toastmaster

- CV I- 1984- Port o’Call Inn,

L. Sprague de Camp - GoH, Catherine Crook de Camp - GoH
