= Canvention =

Canadian science fiction convention

Canvention is the Canadian national science fiction convention, where the Aurora Awards are presented. Normally it is held as part of an existing convention.

== Conventions ==
The list of past Canventions may be referenced in the programme books of the hosting conventions.

- 2019: CAN-CON (convention) 2019 will host in Ottawa, Ontario on October 18-20, 2019
- 2018: VCON 42 held in Richmond, BC on October 05-07, 2018
- 2017: Hal-Con 2017 held in Halifax on September 22-24, 2017
- 2016: When Words Collide, held in Calgary on August 12-14, 2016
- 2015: SFContario 6, was held on November 20-22, 2015
- 2014: VCON 39, was held in Vancouver on October 3-5, 2014
- 2013: CAN-CON, was held in Ottawa on October 4-6, 2013
- 2012: When Words Collide, held in Calgary on August 10-12, 2012
- 2011: SFContario 2, held in Toronto on November 18–20
- 2010: Keycon 27, held in Winnipeg on May 21–24
- 2009: Anticipation, also 67th World Science Fiction Convention (the 2009 Worldcon), held in Montréal on August 6–10
- 2008: Keycon 25, held in Winnipeg on May 16–19
- 2007: VCON 32, held in Vancouver on October 19–21
- 2006: Toronto Trek 20, held in Toronto on July 7–9
- 2005: Westercon 58, held in Calgary on July 1–4
- 2004: Boréal, held in Montreal on October 29–31
- 2003: Torcon 3 (also the 2003 Worldcon), held in Toronto on August 28-September 1
- 2002: Con-Version 19, held in Calgary on August 9–11
- 2001: VCON 26, held in Burnaby on May 4–6
- 2000: Toronto Trek 14, held in Toronto on July 14–16
- 1999: inCONsequential, held in Fredericton on October 15–17
- 1998: Con*Cept, held in Montreal on October 2–4
- 1997: Primedia, held in Markham, Ontario on October 31-November 2
- 1996: Con-Version XIII, held in Calgary on July 19–21
- 1995: CAN-CON '95, held in Ottawa on May 12–14
- 1994: ConAdian (the 1994 Worldcon), held in Winnipeg on September 1–5

(Note: technically, ConAdian did not host Canvention. The award presentation and business meeting were held there, hosted by SF Canada.)

- 1993: Wolfcon 6, held in Wolfville, Nova Scotia on March 12–14
- 1992: Wilfcon 8, held in Waterloo, Ontario at Wilfrid Laurier University on June 27–28
- 1991: ConText '91, held in Edmonton on June 7–9
- 1990: Con-Version 7, held in Calgary on July 20–22
- 1989: PineKone 2, held in Ottawa on October 13–15
- 1988: KeyCon 5, held in Winnipeg on May 20–22
- 1987: Ad Astra 7, held in Toronto on June 12–14
- 1986: VCON 14, held in Vancouver on May 23–24
- 1985: Halcon 8, held in Halifax on March 22–24
- 1983: Maplecon 5, held in Ottawa on July 15–17
- 1982: NonCon 5, held in Edmonton on October 8–11
- 1981, VCON 9, held in Vancouver on May 22–24
- 1980: Halcon 3, held in Halifax on March 7–9

Clint Budd was elected Chair of the CSFFA in May 2015. Prior to that, Cliff Samuels was the most recent administrator of the Prix Aurora Awards (retired in 2015). Clint Budd was administrator from 2007-2012. Dennis Mullin was administrator for many years before that. The original award creators were John Bell and Sheldon Goldman.
