= Jason Taniguchi =

Jason Taniguchi is a writer and actor from Toronto, Ontario, Canada. His poems and short fiction appear in the collection Jason Taniguchi's Very Sensible Stories and Poems for Grown-ups from Kelp Queen Press. He has also both written for and appeared in the History Television series History Bites. Taniguchi is known for his one-man science fiction parody shows at Ad Astra, for which he received the 2003 Prix Aurora Award in the category Fan (Other). Jason is a graduate of the University of Toronto Schools and Trinity College in the University of Toronto. In 1989 he founded the Serial Diners of Toronto, a dining club that visited the restaurants in Toronto's Yellow Pages telephone directory in alphabetical order. The group suspended its activities in March 2020 due to the COVID-19 pandemic.

== Bibliography ==
- Very Sensible Stories and Poems for Grown-ups, Kelp Queen Press, 2004
