= Norwescon =

Annual fan convention for fantasy and science fiction in Seattle, Washington, USA

- Status: Active
- Genre: Science fiction/Fantasy
- Venue: DoubleTree by Hilton Hotel Seattle Airport
- Locations: SeaTac, Washington
- Country: USA
- Inaugurated: 1978
- Attendance: 2,000
- Website: Official website

Norwescon is one of the largest regional science fiction and fantasy conventions in the United States. Located in SeaTac in Washington state, Norwescon has been running continuously since 1978.

"Norwescon", referring to the Pacific Northwest region, was also the name of the 8th World Science Fiction Convention, held in Portland, Oregon, in 1950.

== History ==
Richard Stephens and Suzette Haden Elgin at Norwescon 28 in 2005

Norwescon grew out of the desire of its founders to host a Worldcon in Seattle in 1981. However, there was one major issue — at the time, most of the regional fandom had little or no experience in running cons. Norwescon was therefore originally formed as an effort to get some practice for Worldcon. Realizing they would need a large group of people from which to draw volunteers, the founders also started the Northwest Science Fiction Society or NWSFS.

The first Norwescon was held in a then-unincorporated area now known as the city of SeaTac, Washington. It featured Theodore Sturgeon as its Guest of Honor (GoH) and drew just over 400 attendees. The next year, Norwescon moved up the street to the Hyatt Hotel, the site of the 1961 Worldcon. The Hyatt was the site of Norwescons II through VII, at which point the convention began feeling the pressures of growth; it was then moved to SeaTac's Red Lion Inn. With growth came associated problems, and after two years at the Red Lion, Norwescon was forced to find a new location on short notice. The convention moved back to the Hyatt for a convention called Alternacon. The next year brought a big move to the city of Tacoma, where the Sheraton hosted Norwescon for five years. 1993 brought the convention to the Bellevue area, and in 1994 Norwescon returned to the site of the old Red Lion Inn, now known as the DoubleTree Hotel SeaTac, where it has been ever since, excepting 2020, when the convention was canceled due to the COVID-19 pandemic, and 2021, when the convention was all-virtual.

Norwescon's Guest of Honor list has grown over the years, starting with a list of three: Writer Guest of Honor, Fan Guest of Honor, and Toastmaster. The list now includes artists, scientists, volunteers and special guests as well as many other professionals. Norwescon has always made an effort to invite guests who are deserving of the honor, and has thus had a prestigious line of guests.

Norwescon also hosts the Philip K. Dick Award, given to the author of the best original novel appearing in the previous year in paperback form without prior publication as a hardback. The first recipient of the Philip K. Dick Memorial Award was Rudy Rucker for his novel, Software. Norwescon first hosted the Philip K. Dick Award in its second year, at Norwescon VII in 1984.

== Editions ==
By decades, reverse chronological order. XIII (13) which would've been in the early 1990s was skipped, but since the numbering had already skipped a year for the 1987 Alternacon, it made the year count synch up with the con name again. In the early 2010s the numbering switched to Arabic numerals from Roman numerals before.

=== 2020s ===
- Norwescon 49 - March 25–28, 2027 (planned); Writer GoH Seanan McGuire; Artist GoH Todd Lockwood; Science GoH Erin Macdonald; Spotlight Publisher DAW Books; and Special Guest Matt Dinniman.
- Norwescon 48 - April 2–5, 2026; Writer GoH Ursula Vernon; Artist GoH Geneva Bowers; Science GoH Summer Ash; Spotlight Publisher Orbit; and Special Guest Dutch Bihary.
- Norwescon 47 - April 17–20, 2025; Writer GoH Catherynne M. Valente; Artist GoH Wayne Barlowe; Science GoH Tracy Drain; Spotlight Publisher Paizo; and Special Guest Isis Asare.
- Norwescon 46 - March 28–31, 2024; Writer GoH Jim Butcher (did not attend); Artist GoH Charles Vess; Science GoH Raychelle Burks; Spotlight Publisher Clarkesworld Magazine; and Special Guest Kate Alice Marshall.
- Norwescon 45 - April 6–9, 2023; Writer GoH P. Djèlí Clark; Artist GoH Grace P. Fong; and Spotlight Publisher Uncanny Magazine.
- Norwescon 44 - April 14–17, 2022; Writer GoH Cat Rambo; Artist GoH Rob Carlos; Spotlight Publisher Fairwood Press; and Special Guests Kenna Alexander and Lydia K. Valentine.
- Norwescon 43 - April 1–4, 2021; Writer GoH Jacqueline Carey; Artist GoH Sana Takeda; Science GoH Dr. Susan Langley; Spotlight Publisher Tor Books

=== 2010s ===
- Norwescon 42 - April 18–21, 2019; Writer GoH Mary Robinette Kowal; Artist GoH Tran Nguyen; Science GoH Dan Koboldt; Special Guest of Honor - Nancy Pearl; Spotlight Publisher - Subterranean Press
- Norwescon 41 - March 29-April 1, 2018; Writer GoH Ken Liu; Artist GoH Galen Dara; Science GoH Mathew Wedel; Spotlight Publisher Green Ronin Publishing
- Norwescon 40 - April 13–16, 2017; Writer GoH Ian McDonald; Artist GoH Cory & Catska Ench; Science GoH Ethan Siegel; Spotlight Publisher Angry Robot Books
- Norwescon 39 - March 24–27, 2016; Writer GoH Tanya Huff; Artist GoH Janny Wurts; Science GoH Dr. William Hartmann; Spotlight Publisher DAW Books
- Norwescon 38 - April 2–5, 2015; Writer GoH George R. R. Martin; Artist GoH Julie Dillon; Science GoH Amy Mainzer; Spotlight Publisher Random House
- Norwescon 37 - April 17–20, 2014; Writer GoH Michael Moorcock; Artist GoH Robert Gould; Science GoH Catherine S. Plesko; Costuming GoH Anima! X; Special GoH Seanan McGuire; Spotlight Publisher 47North
- Norwescon 36 - March 28–31, 2013; Writer GoH Catherine Asaro; Artist GoH Lee Moyer; Science GoH Edward Tenner; Special GoH Gardner Dozois; Norwescon 36 Grandmaster Terry Brooks; Spotlight Publisher Baen Books; Attendance ~3200
- Norwescon 35 - April 5–8, 2012; GoH Stephen Baxter; AGoH John Picacio; Science Guest Bridget Landry; Spotlight Publisher DAW Books; Attendance ~3100
- Norwescon 34 - April 21–24, 2011; GoH Patricia McKillip; AGoH Kinuko Craft; PSIence Guest Marie D. Jones; Special Guest Jim Butcher; Special Guest Shannon Butcher; Spotlight Publisher PYR; Attendance ~3500
- Norwescon XXXIII - April 1–4, 2010; GoH Vernor Vinge; AGoH John Jude Palencar; Science Guest John G. Cramer; Special GoH Cory Doctorow; Spotlighted Publisher Tor Books; Attendance 3349

=== 2000s ===
- Norwescon XXXII - April 9–12, 2009; GoH R.A. Salvatore; AGoH Todd Lockwood; Special GoH Geno Salvatore; Spotlighted Publisher Wizards of the Coast; Attendance 3115
- Norwescon XXXI - March 20–24, 2008; GoH Dan Simmons; AGoH Ciruelo; Special GoH Naomi Novik; Attendance 3030
- Norwescon XXX - April 5–8, 2007; GoH Kim Stanley Robinson; AGoH Luis Royo; Science GoH Donna Shirley; Spotlighted Publisher The Magazine of Fantasy & Science Fiction represented by Gordon Van Gelder; Attendance 3024
- Norwescon XXIX - April 13–16, 2006; GoH Lois McMaster Bujold; AGoH Donato Giancola; TM Robert J. Sawyer; Spotlighted Publisher DAW Books represented by Betsy Wollheim and Sheila Gilbert; Attendance 2758
- Norwescon XXVIII - March 24–27, 2005; GoH Michael Bishop; AGoH Stephen Hickman; Special GoH Alan Dean Foster; Science GoH Suzette Haden Elgin; Spotlighted Publisher Tor Books represented by Tom Doherty; Attendance 2603
- Norwescon XXVII - April 8–11, 2004; GoH Mike Resnick; AGoH Don Dixon; Special GoH Joe Haldeman; Science GoH Ben Bova; Spotlighted Publisher Baen Books represented by Jim Baen; Attendance 2610
- Norwescon XXVI - April 17–20, 2003; GoH: Jane Yolen; AGoH Jim Burns; Science GoH Geoffrey Landis; Special GoH Michael Whelan; Spotlighted Publisher Del Rey Books; Attendance 2718
- Norwescon XXV - March 28–31, 2002; GoH: Jack Vance; AGoH Brom; FGoH Andrew I. Porter; Spotlighted Publisher WOTC Publishing; Attendance 2787
- Norwescon XXIV - April 12–15, 2001; GoH: Connie Willis; AGoH Bob Eggleton; FGoH Charles N. Brown; Special GoH James P. Hogan; Special GoH Dragon Dronet; Spotlighted Publisher Bantam Dell Publishing Group represented by Anne Lesley Groell; Attendance 3054
- Norwescon XXIII - April 20–23, 2000; GoH: David Brin, Gregory Benford; AGoH Barclay Shaw; FGoH Bjo and John Trimble; Spotlighted Publisher HarperCollins and Eos represented by Jennifer Brehl; Attendance 2765

=== 1990s ===
- Norwescon XXII - April 1–4, 1999; GoH: Harry Turtledove; AGoH Richard Hescox; FGoH Jack Chalker, Eva Whitley; Science GoH Jack Horner; Volunteer GoH Susan Allen; Spotlighted Publisher Ministry of Whimsy; Attendance
- Norwescon XXI - April 9–12, 1998; GoH: Neil Gaiman; AGoH Brian Froud; FGoH John Lorentz, Ruth Sachter; Science GoH Patricia MacEwen; Volunteer GoH Anthony Ward; Attendance ?
- Norwescon XX - March 27–30, 1997; GoH: Larry Niven, A. E. van Vogt; AGoH Vincent Di Fate; FGoH Brad Foster; Science GoH Dr. Robert L. Forward; Volunteer GoH Glenda Hedden; Attendance ?
- Norwescon XIX - April 4–7, 1996; GoH: A.C. Crispin; AGoH Tom Kidd; FGoH Kitty Canterbury; TM Janna Silverstein; Volunteer GoH David Valentine; Attendance ~2590
- Norwescon XVIII - April 6–9, 1995; GoH: Robert Silverberg; AGoH James Gurney; TM Dragon Dronet; Science GoH Dr. Jane Robinson; Volunteer GoH Danny Rudesill; Attendance ~2675
- Norwescon XVII - March 31-April 3, 1994; GoH: Kurtz & Scott MacMillan; AGoH Darrell K. Sweet; FGoH Peggy Rae Pavlat; TM Janna Silverstein; Attendance ~2680
- Norwescon XVI - March 25–28, 1993; GoH: Betty Ballantine (did not attend); AGoH Janny Wurts; FGoH Pat Mueller; TM Bonnie Baker; Science GoH Chris Jonientz-Trisler (Sunday only); Special GoH Anne McCaffrey (did not attend); surprise GoH Mike Jittlov; Volunteer GoH Teresa Janssen; Attendance ~2430
- Norwescon XV - March 26–29, 1992; GoH: Poul Anderson; AGoh Alan Gutierrez; FGoH Willie Siros; TM J. Steven York; Volunteer GoH Celia Smith; Attendance ~2400
- Norwescon XIV - March 28–31, 1991; GoH: Stanley Schmidt; AGoH James Warhola; FGoH Becky Thomson; TM Edward Bryant; Special GoH Forrest J. Ackerman; Volunteer GoH Joe Laybourn; Attendance 2320
- Norwescon XII - March 29-April 1, 1990; GoH: Roger Zelazny; AGoH David Cherry; FGoH Pat Mueller; TM Dan Reeder; Science GoH Dr. John G. Cramer; Volunteer GoH Joe Wheeler Attendance 2274

=== 1980s ===
- Norwescon XI - March 23–26, 1989; GoH: Algis Budrys; AGoH David Mattingly; FGoH Mike Glyer; TM Steven Barnes; Science GoH Dr. Alan E. Nourse; Special GoH Avram Davidson; Attendance 2292
- Norwescon X - March 24–27, 1988; GoH: Marion Zimmer Bradley; AGoH Rick Sternbach; FGoH Jon Gustafson; TM David Gerrold; Special GoH Avram Davidson; Attendance 2032
- Norwescon's Alternacon - March 26–29, 1987; AGoH Dan Reeder; GoH: Orson Scott Card; FGoH Marty & Robbie Cantor; TM David Hartwell; Attendance <1700
- Norwescon IX - March 20–23, 1986; GoH: Anne McCaffrey; AGoH Kelly Freas; FGoH Greg Bennett; TM Spider Robinson; Science GoH James Oberg; Attendance "HUGE" (estimates top 3000)
- Norwescon VIII - March 14–17, 1985; GoH: Brian Aldiss; AGoH Jack Gaughan (did not attend); FGoH Rich Brown; TM Robert Silverberg; Science GoH Gregory Benford; Attendance ?
- Norwescon VII - March 22–25, 1984; GoH: L. Sprague & Catherine Crook de Camp; AGoH Don Maitz; FGoH Jack Speer; TM Marta Randall; Attendance ~1700
- Norwescon VI - March 17–20, 1983; GoH: Jack Williamson; AGoH Richard Powers; FGoH Art Widner; TM Algis Budrys; Attendance ?
- Norwescon V - March 18–21, 1982; GoH: Thomas Disch; AGoH Michael Whelan; FGoH Bob Shaw; TM Richard A. Lupoff; Attendance 1371
- Norwescon IV - March 27–29, 1981; GoH: Samuel R. Delany; FGoH Jack Palmer, Pauline Palmer, and Tilda Palmer; TM Philip Klass (William Tenn); Attendance 1410
- Norwescon III - March 28–30, 1980; GoH: Alfred Bester; FGoH Fred Pohl; TM Theodore Sturgeon; Attendance 732

=== 1970s ===
- Norwescon II - March 23–25, 1979; GoH: Philip José Farmer; FGoH Loren MacGregor; TM Elizabeth A. Lynn; Attendance 725
- Norwescon I - March 25–26, 1978; GoH: Theodore Sturgeon; FGoH John D. Berry; TM Alan E. Nourse; Attendance 415
