= SFContario =

Science fiction convention held in Toronto, Ontario, Canada

- SFContario logo by Brad W. Foster
- Status: Active
- Genre: Science fiction
- Venue: Ramada Plaza Hotel
- Locations: Toronto, Ontario
- Country: Canada
- Inaugurated: 2010
- Organizer: Science Fiction and Fantasy Society of Upper Canada
- Website: http://sfcontario.ca/

SFContario is a general-interest science fiction convention held in Toronto, Ontario, Canada and sponsored by the Science Fiction and Fantasy Society of Upper Canada.

The first convention took place on November 19–21, 2010, at the Ramada Plaza Hotel in Toronto. The guests of honour were author Michael Swanwick, writers and editors Patrick and Teresa Nielsen Hayden, fan Geri Sullivan, filk musician Karen Linsley, artist Billy Tackett, and toastmaster Robert J. Sawyer. The convention chair was Alexander von Thorn.

Events at the convention included panels on science fiction and fantasy, writing, science, fan history and conventions, and media, as well as author readings, autograph signings, an interview with expatriate American SF writer and HUAC victim Chandler Davis, kaffeeklatsches, a ceremony presenting pins to past Prix Aurora Award nominees, a masquerade, an art show, a charity auction, filk concerts, bid and other parties, an anime room, and an improv fundraiser for the Sunburst Award performed by improvisers from the Impatient Theatre Co.

A second convention was held on November 18–20, 2011, at the Ramada Plaza Hotel in Toronto. The scheduled guests of honour include international author John Scalzi, Canadian author Karl Schroeder, editor Gardner Dozois, and filk band Toyboat. This event also served as the 31st Canvention, Canada's national science fiction convention which included Canadian Unity Fan Fund (CUFF) guest of honour Kent Pollard from Saskatoon.

The third convention was held from November 9–11, 2012, at the Ramada Plaza Hotel in Toronto. The scheduled guests of honour include Hugo and Nebula winner Jo Walton, Jon Singer, and Hugo Winner Christopher J Garcia.

A fourth convention is planned for November 29-December 1, 2013, at the same location, with guests Seanan McGuire, Dave Kyle, and Chandler Davis.
