= Sean Russell (author) =

Canadian author of fantasy and historical novels (born 1952)

Sean Thomas Russell (born 30 January 1952) is a Canadian writer of fantasy, and of historical novels featuring the Royal Navy. His work has been published under the names Sean Russell and S. Thomas Russell as well as his full name, and he has collaborated with Ian Dennis (also born 1952) under the joint pseudonym T.F. Banks.

== Life ==
Sean Russell was born in Toronto, Ontario, in 1952. At the age of three his family moved to the outskirts of the city, where they lived in a cottage at the beach of Lake Ontario. At the age of ten he decided to become an author, and the fantasy genre caught him years later, while reading J. R. R. Tolkien's The Lord of the Rings. After university, he moved to Vancouver, and two years later to Vancouver Island, where he still lives with his family. He published his first novel in 1991.

His first historical naval novel Under Enemy Colours, published in 2007, introduced a new Royal Navy hero, Charles Hayden, and HMS Themis, a fictional fifth-rate ship of the Royal Navy.

== Works ==
=== Initiate Brother ===
The series is laid in a fantasy empire combining aspects of China and Japan.

- Vol. 1: The Initiate Brother, DAW Books, 1991, ISBN 0-88677-466-7
- Vol. 2: Gatherer of Clouds, DAW Books, 1992, ISBN 0-88677-536-1

=== Moontide and Magic Rise ===
- Vol. 1: World Without End, DAW Books, 1995, ISBN 0-88677-624-4
- Vol. 2: Sea Without a Shore, DAW Books, 1996, ISBN 0-88677-665-1

=== The River into Darkness ===
This fantasy duology is a prequel to the "Moontide and Magic Rise" duology.

- Vol. 1: Beneath the Vaulted Hills, DAW Books, 1997, ISBN 0-88677-794-1
- Vol. 2: The Compass of the Soul, DAW Books, 1998, ISBN 0-88677-933-2
- Vol. 1-2: The River into Darkness, Science Fiction Book Club, 1998, ISBN 1-56865-901-6 (omnibus)

=== Memoirs of a Bow Street Runner ===
Sean Russell wrote these books in collaboration with Ian Dennis under their common pen-name T. F. Banks.

- Vol. 1: The Thief Taker, Delacorte Press, 2001, ISBN 0-385-33571-7
- Vol. 2: The Emperor's Assassin, Dell Books, 2003, ISBN 0-440-24084-0

=== Swans' War ===
- Vol. 1: The One Kingdom, HarperCollins, 2001, ISBN 0-380-97489-4
- Vol. 2: The Isle of Battle, HarperCollins, 2003, ISBN 0-380-97490-8
- Vol. 3: The Shadow Roads, HarperCollins, 2005, ISBN 0-380-97491-6

=== Themis series ===
Written as by Sean Thomas Russell, these books are historical fiction about HMS Themis, a Royal Navy frigate, at the time of the French Revolution.

- Under Enemy Colours (2007)
- A Battle Won (2010)
- A Ship of War (2012); US title, 2013, Take, Burn or Destroy
- Until the Sea Shall Give Up Her Dead (2014)

== See also ==
- Historical fantasy
- Sea story
