= 52nd World Science Fiction Convention =

52nd Worldcon (1994)

ConAdian, the 52nd World Science Fiction Convention
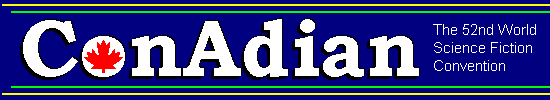
- Genre: Science fiction
- Dates: 1–5 September 1994
- Venue: Winnipeg Convention Centre
- Locations: Winnipeg, Manitoba, Canada
- Country: Canada
- Attendance: ~3,570
- Filing status: Non-profit
- Website: Official website (archive)

The 52nd World Science Fiction Convention (Worldcon), also known as ConAdian, was held on 1–5 September 1994 at the Crowne Plaza, Place Louis Riel, and Sheraton hotels, and the Winnipeg Convention Centre in Winnipeg, Manitoba, Canada.

The chairman was John Mansfield.

== Participants ==
Attendance was approximately 3,570.

=== Guests of Honour ===
- Anne McCaffrey (pro)
- George Barr (artist)
- Robert Runte (fan)
- Barry B. Longyear (toastmaster)

== Awards ==
The World Science Fiction Society administers and presents the Hugo Awards, the oldest and most noteworthy award for science fiction. Selection of the recipients is by vote of the Worldcon members. Categories include novels and short fiction, artwork, dramatic presentations, and various professional and fandom activities.

Other awards may be presented at Worldcon at the discretion of the individual convention committee. This has often included the national SF awards of the host country, such as the Japanese Seiun Awards as part of Nippon 2007, and the Prix Aurora Awards as part of Anticipation in 2009. The Astounding Award for Best New Writer and the Sidewise Award, though not sponsored by the Worldcon, are usually presented, as well as the Chesley Awards, the Prometheus Award, and others. In 2021, the Nommo Awards began presenting at Worldcon.

=== 1994 Hugo Awards ===
- Best Novel: Green Mars by Kim Stanley Robinson
- Best Novella: "Down in the Bottomlands" by Harry Turtledove
- Best Novelette: "Georgia on My Mind" by Charles Sheffield
- Best Short Story: "Death on the Nile" by Connie Willis
- Best Non-Fiction Book: The Encyclopedia of Science Fiction by John Clute and Peter Nicholls
- Best Dramatic Presentation: Jurassic Park
- Best Original Artwork: Space Fantasy Commemorative Stamp Booklet by Stephen Hickman
- Best Professional Editor: Kristine Kathryn Rusch
- Best Professional Artist: Bob Eggleton
- Best Semiprozine: Science Fiction Chronicle, edited by Andrew I. Porter
- Best Fanzine: Mimosa, edited by Dick Lynch & Nicki Lynch
- Best Fan Writer: Dave Langford
- Best Fan Artist: Brad W. Foster

=== Other awards ===
- John W. Campbell Award for Best New Writer: Amy Thomson

== Notes ==
ConAdian was the first Worldcon with its own official website.

== See also ==
- Hugo Award
- Science fiction
- Speculative fiction
- World Science Fiction Society
- Worldcon

Preceded by 51st World Science Fiction Convention; ConFrancisco in San Francisco, California, United States (1993)	List of Worldcons; 52nd World Science Fiction Convention; ConAdian in Winnipeg, Manitoba, Canada (1994)	Succeeded by 53rd World Science Fiction Convention; Intersection in Glasgow, UK (1995)
