= Nepean Museum =

Coordinates: 45.349521°N 75.741377°W

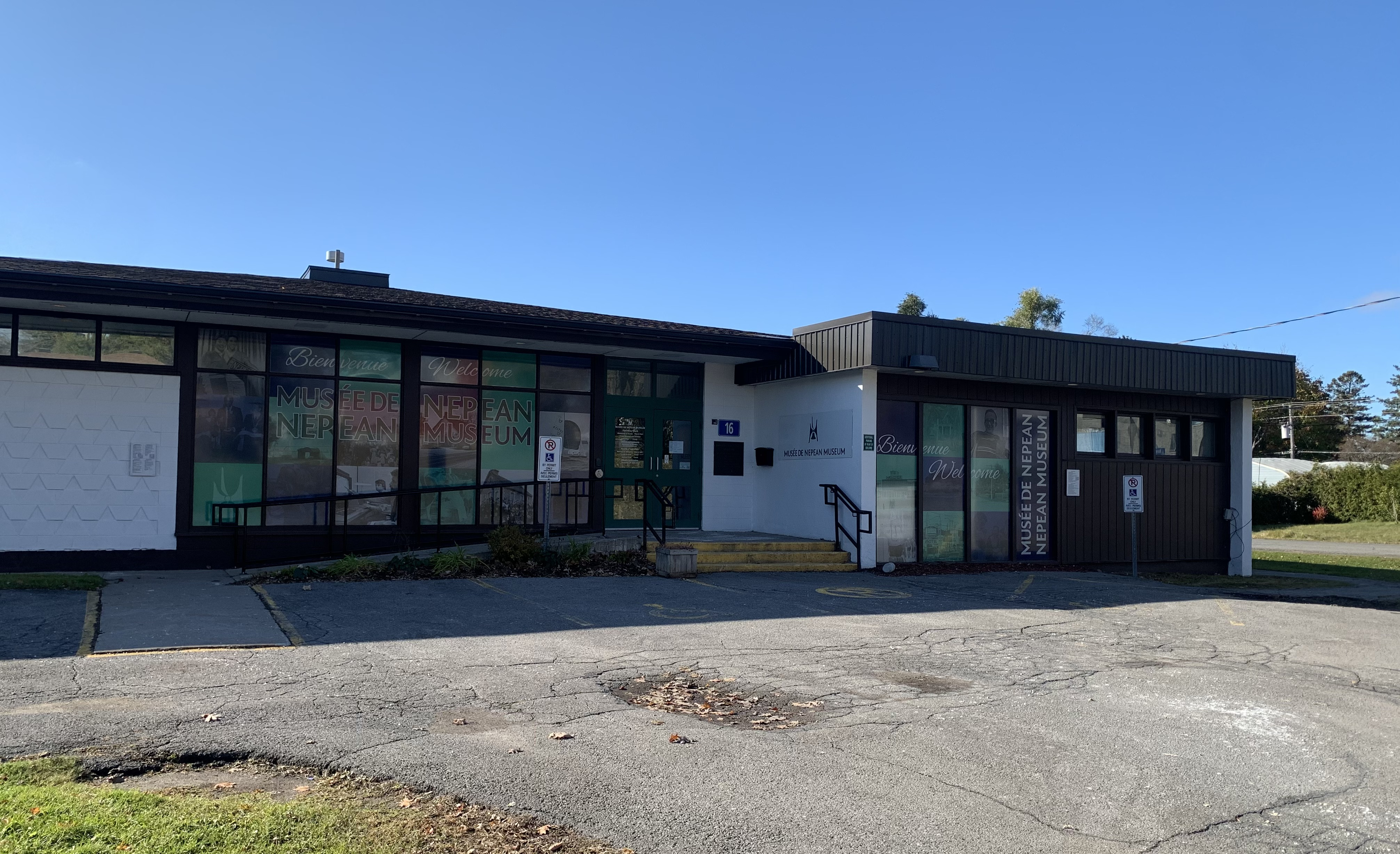
- Location: 16 Rowley Avenue; Ottawa, Ontario; K2G 1L9
- Type: History of Nepean, Ontario
- Website: Nepean Museum

The Nepean Museum is a museum in Ottawa, Ontario, Canada. It is a community-focused museum that preserves, makes accessible and communicates the former municipality of Nepean's history. Artifacts related to Nepean, from its beginnings to the 20th century, are restored and displayed in the museum galleries and grounds. The museum has an open concept exhibit area of approximately 2000sq ft. The museum collects, preserves, researches, exhibits and interprets the works of man and nature in Nepean. Its address is 16 Rowley Avenue, Ottawa, Ontario, Canada.

Although daily admission to the museum is free, special event and program fees may apply. The museum is open Monday to Friday, 10 a.m. to 5 p.m., and Saturdays and Sundays from 1 p.m. to 4 p.m. Closed November 11, December 25 and 26, and January 1.

== History ==
The West Carleton Museum was established in 1973. In 1976, the West Carleton Museum was renamed the “Nepean Museum”. The Nepean Museum was incorporated as a non-profit organization in 1983. It operated out of the Graham Park Cultural Activities Center from 1973-1985. In 1985, the Museum relocated to the Davidson family farmhouse on Baseline Road.

The Nepean Parks & Recreation Department leased the old library facility at 16 Rowley Avenue to the Nepean Museum in 1989. The Nepean Museum opened its doors at that address in 1989 and a renovation was completed in 1990. As of the mid-2020s the museum remained at that location.

== Buildings, facilities, and exhibits ==
The history of Nepean has been preserved from 1792 onwards with a large collection of artifacts. The Nepean Museum provides tours at Fairfields Heritage Property, a 19th-century Gothic Revival-style farmhouse and the five generations of the Bell family who resided at Fairfields from 1823 to 2000. The property at 3080 Richmond Road was first purchased by William Bell in the 1820s. The home, standing on 1.8 hectares of land, remained in the Bell family for nearly 175 years. The 660 acres of land was initially cultivated for farming, though later subdivided and sections sold. The archives research facility provides access to collections relevant to historians and genealogists interested in the city. Special events are held throughout the year.

== Affiliations ==
The museum is affiliated with: CMA, CHIN, and Virtual Museum of Canada.

== Works ==
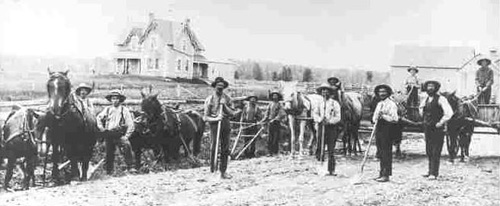
Nepean Museum's Fallowfield Road Gang (1880)

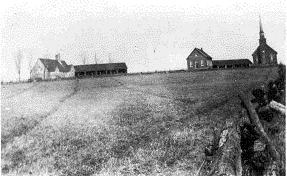
Nepean Museum's Steeplehill churches (1910)

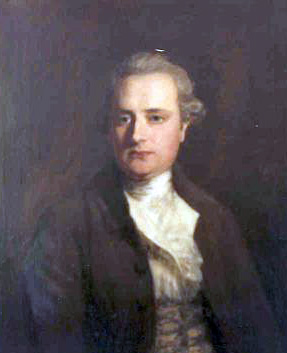
Nepean Museum's Sir Evan Nepean (1750s)
