= Ad Astra (convention) =

Annual science fiction, fantasy, and horror convention in Ontario

- Status: Active
- Genre: Science fiction, Fantasy, and Horror
- Venue: Sheraton Parkway North
- Locations: Richmond Hill, Ontario
- Country: Canada
- Inaugurated: 1980
- Website: http://www.ad-astra.org/

Ad Astra is an annual science fiction, fantasy, and horror convention in Ontario. Major events of the convention include the Masquerade, Guest of Honour presentations, panel discussions, Art Show, and Dealer's Room, as well as a wide variety of privately run room parties. Other events on the convention program include a games room, book launches, and the Saturday evening dance.

== Programming ==
Ad Astra's programming features a wide variety of discussion panels on various topics of interest to science fiction and fantasy fans. Writing, art, and costuming workshops are also often seen each year at the convention.

== History ==
Ad Astra first ran in 1980, and has run every year since, excepting 1981, 1999 and 2020. The convention occasionally serves as host for other conventions; for example, Canvention 7 was held as part of Ad Astra 7, in 1987, and the convention hosted the Toronto games convention Orion for the years 2003 and 2004.

In previous years, guests have included prominent Canadian writers including Robert J. Sawyer, Nalo Hopkinson, Tanya Huff, Guy Gavriel Kay, Robert Charles Wilson, Phyllis Gotlieb, etc., as well as internationally renowned authors including C. J. Cherryh, David Brin, Connie Willis, Stephen Hunt, Larry Niven, Lois McMaster Bujold, Frederik Pohl, Katherine Kurtz, Orson Scott Card, James P. Hogan and others. Ad Astra has continued to evolve past its focus on literature to include programming dedicated to costuming, art, filking, and media. In some years, Jason Taniguchi has performed popular one-man parody shows at the convention.

=== Event history ===
Dates	Location	Guests of Honour
June 13, 1980 - June 15, 1980	Ramada Inn Downtown; Toronto, Ontario, Canada	James Hogan, Steve Simmons
June 11, 1982 - June 13, 1982	Cara Inn; Mississauga, Ontario, Canada	Jerry Pournelle, Ro Lutz-Nagey
September 23, 1983 - September 25, 1983	Cara Inn; Mississauga, Ontario, Canada	Ben Bova, Ken Fletcher
June 8, 1984 - June 10, 1984	Howard Johnson Airport Hotel; Toronto, Ontario, Canada	Dean Ing, David C. Onley, Bob Passavoy
June 7, 1985 - June 9, 1985	Holiday Inn Airport Hotel; Toronto, Ontario, Canada	David Brin, Vonda McIntyre, Mike Glyer
June 13, 1986 - June 15, 1986	Regal Constellation Hotel; 900 Dixon Rd, Etobicoke, Ontario, Canada	Steven Brust, Roger Zelazny, Frank Kelly Freas
June 12, 1987 - June 14, 1987	Holiday Inn Airport Hotel; Toronto, Ontario, Canada	C. J. Cherryh, Elisabeth Vonarburg, Diana Gallagher Wu
June 10, 1988 - June 12, 1988	Holiday Inn Airport Hotel; Toronto, Ontario, Canada	Orson Scott Card, R.A. MacAvoy, Fran Skene, Taral Wayne
June 9, 1989 - June 11, 1989	Regal Constellation Hotel; 900 Dixon Rd, Etobicoke, Ontario, Canada	John Varley, Kerry O'Quinn
June 8, 1990 - June 10, 1990	Howard Johnson Airport Hotel; Toronto, Ontario, Canada	Terry Pratchett, Frank Kelly Freas, Larry Stewart
June 7, 1991 - June 9, 1991	Holiday Inn Airport Hotel; Toronto, Ontario, Canada	Barbara Hambly, George Alec Effinger, Bob Eggleton
June 5, 1992 - June 7, 1992	Sheraton Toronto East Hotel & Towers; Toronto, Ontario, Canada	Katherine Kurtz, Lois McMaster Bujold, Jan Howard Finder
June 4, 1993 - June 6, 1993	Sheraton Toronto East Hotel & Towers; Toronto, Ontario, Canada	Frederik Pohl, Dave Duncan, Robin Wood
June 17, 1994 - June 19, 1994	Sheraton Toronto East Hotel & Towers; Toronto, Ontario, Canada	L. Sprague de Camp, Catherine Crook de Camp, Diane Duane, Peter Morwood, George Alec Effinger
June 16, 1995 - June 18, 1995	Holiday Inn Yorkdale; 3450 Dufferin St, Toronto, Ontario, Canada	Roger Zelazny, A.C. Crispin, Shawna McCarthy, Wayne Barlowe, Kim Newman, Stephen Jones, Michael Copabianco, Ellen Datlow
June 7, 1996 - June 9, 1996	Days Inn Airport; Mississauga, Ontario, Canada	Larry Niven, James P. Hogan, Philip Pullman, Robert J. Sawyer, Kathryn Cramer
June 13, 1997 - June 15, 1997	Days Inn Airport; Mississauga, Ontario, Canada	Steven Brust, Tim Powers, John Clute
June 5, 1998 - June 7, 1998	Radisson Hotel Toronto East Don Valley; 55 Hallcrown Pl, Toronto, Ontario, Canada	Josepha Sherman, Tanya Huff, Keith & Gary Arseneau
February 18, 2000 - February 20, 2000	Best Western Primrose Hotel; 111 Carlton St, Toronto, Ontario, Canada	Nancy Kress, Charles de Lint, Christopher Stasheff, Scott Edelman, Lloyd and Yvonne Penney
February 23, 2001 - February 25, 2001	Holiday Inn Don Valley Toronto East; 1100 Eglinton Ave E, Toronto, Ontario, Canada	Connie Willis, David G. Hartwell, Rick Green, Robert J. Sawyer, Urban Tapestry
February 8, 2002 - February 10, 2002	Colony Hotel; 89 Chestnut St, Toronto, Ontario, Canada	Guy Gavriel Kay, John Howe, Julie E. Czerneda, Ted Nasmith
March 21, 2003 - March 23, 2003	Colony Hotel; 89 Chestnut St, Toronto, Ontario, Canada	David Brin, Tanya Huff, Robert Gould, Brian Froud
April 2, 2004 - April 4, 2004	Crowne Plaza Toronto Don Valley Hotel; 1250 Eglinton Ave E, Toronto, Ontario, Canada	C. J. Cherryh, Robert Charles Wilson, Patrick Nielsen Hayden, Mark Askwith, Don Bassingthwaite, Gord Rose
April 8, 2005 - April 10, 2005	Days Hotel & Conference Centre - Toronto Airport East; 1677 Wilson Ave, Toronto, Ontario, Canada	Nalo Hopkinson, Dan Hutchinson, Tom Smith, Charles Vess, Peter Watts
March 31, 2006 - April 2, 2006	Crowne Plaza Toronto Don Valley Hotel; 1250 Eglinton Ave E, Toronto, Ontario, Canada	Kelley Armstrong, Terry Brooks, Peter David, Ed Greenwood, Betsy Mitchell, Martin Springett, David Warren
March 2, 2007 - March 4, 2007	Crowne Plaza Toronto Don Valley Hotel; 1250 Eglinton Ave E, Toronto, Ontario, Canada	Cory Doctorow, Ed Beard Jr., Phyllis Gotlieb, Stephen Jones, Lee Knight & Chris Knight
March 28, 2008 - March 30, 2008	Crowne Plaza Toronto Don Valley Hotel; 1250 Eglinton Ave E, Toronto, Ontario, Canada	Yvonne Gilbert, Howard Tayler, Christopher Golden, Rebecca Moesta, Kevin J. Anderson, Dr. Shelley Rabinovitch, Glen Loates, Wayne Brown
March 27, 2009 - March 29, 2009	Crowne Plaza Toronto Don Valley Hotel; 1250 Eglinton Ave E, Toronto, Ontario, Canada	Melyssa Ade, Nigel Bennett, Kent Burles, David Drake, Michael Green, Joanne Ellen Hansen, Liana & Steven Kerzner, Mary-Ellen McAlonen, Tamora Pierce, Timothy Zahn
April 9, 2010 - April 11, 2010	Toronto Don Valley Hotel; 1250 Eglinton Ave E, Toronto, Ontario, Canada	Aaron Allston, Eric Flint, Todd McCaffrey, Nerdgasm, Cathy Palmer-Lister, Robert J. Sawyer
April 8, 2011 - April 10, 2011	Toronto Don Valley Hotel; 1250 Eglinton Ave E, Toronto, Ontario, Canada	Ben Bova, Kathryn Cramer, Julie Czerneda, Ellen Datlow, Larry Dixon, Dave Duncan, Scott Edelman, Eric Flint, Ed Greenwood, David G. Hartwell, Tanya Huff, Don Hutchison, Stephen Jones, Guy Gavriel Kay, Mercedes Lackey, Todd McCaffrey, Shawna McCarthy, Tamora Pierce, Howard Tayler, Élisabeth Vonarburg, Peter Watts
April 13, 2012 - April 15, 2012	Markham Holiday Inn; 10 East Pearce Street, Richmond Hill, Ontario, Canada	Harry Turtledove, Lesley Livingston, Shelly Shapiro, Joe Jusko, Peter Halasz
April 5, 2013 - April 7, 2013	Markham Holiday Inn; 10 East Pearce Street, Richmond Hill, Ontario, Canada	Ben Bova, Jim Butcher, Scott Caple, Stephen Hunt, Cris Macht
April 4, 2014 - April 6, 2014	Sheraton Parkway North; 600 HWY-7 E, Richmond Hill, Ontario, Ontario, Canada	David Weber, Steven Erikson, Anne Groell, Patricia Briggs, Donato Giancola, Mark Townsend
April 10, 2015 - April 12, 2015	Sheraton Parkway North; 600 HWY-7 E, Richmond Hill, Ontario, Ontario, Canada	Anne Bishop, Charles de Lint, MaryAnn Harris, Denis McGrath, Monica Pacheco
April 29, 2016 - May 1, 2016	Sheraton Parkway North; 600 HWY-7 E, Richmond Hill, Ontario, Ontario, Canada	Catherine Asaro, Tom Doherty, Sandra Kasturi, Brett Savory, Jack Whyte
May 5, 2017 - May 7, 2017	Sheraton Parkway North; 600 HWY-7 E, Richmond Hill, Ontario, Ontario, Canada	Brandon Sanderson, Kristen Britain, SM Stirling, Eric Choi, Anne Bishop, Julie Czernada, Ed Greenwood, Guy K. Gavriel, Monica Pacheco, Robert J. Sawyer, Martin Springett
July 14, 2018 - July 16, 2018	Sheraton Parkway North; 600 HWY-7 E, Richmond Hill, Ontario, Ontario, Canada	Bill Fawcett, Maria V Snyder, Timothy Zahn, Jody Lynn Nye, Sylvain Neuvel, Ed Greenwood, Robert J. Sawyer, Lesley Livingston, Eric Choi
July 12, 2019 - July 14, 2019	Sheraton Parkway North; 600 HWY-7 E, Richmond Hill, Ontario, Ontario, Canada	
May 1, 2020 - May 3, 2020	Toronto Don Valley Hotel and Suites; 175 Wynford Dr, Toronto, Ontario, Canada	Ellen Kushner, Robert J. Sawyer, Eric Choi, Ed Greenwood

== See also ==
- Toronto
- Canadian science fiction
