= Greg Bennett (writer) =

American novelist

Gregory Bennett
- Born: March 12, 1950 (age 76); Independence, Kansas
- Occupation: Writer
- Writing career
- Subject: Science fiction

Gregory R. Bennett is a space flight engineer and science fiction writer. He founded the Artemis Project in 1994.

== Publications ==
=== Science-fiction stories ===
- Fish Tank (June 1995)
- The Last Plague (April 1994)
- Protocol (December 1993)
- Swan Song (August 1993)
- Tinker's Spectacles (June 1993)

=== Non-fiction publications ===
- The Artemis Project: Selling the Moon (January 1995)
- Toward [space] station operability (November 1988)
- EVA Design Integration for Space Station Assemble AEROTECH 88/SAE (October 3–6, 1988)
- Space Station Operations in the Twenty-First Century (1986)
- Manned Space Flight Operations Analysis (1985)
- Space Station Yesterday and Tomorrow (1984)
- SST Handling Qualities (1975)
