= Ottawa Science Fiction Society =

Coordinates: 45.368°N 75.689°W

- Abbreviation: OSFS
- Formation: 1977
- Type: science fiction organizations based in Canada
- Legal status: active
- Purpose: advocate and public voice, educator and network
- Headquarters: Ottawa, Ontario, Canada
- Region served: Canada
- Official language: English, French
- Website: osfs.ncf.ca

The Ottawa Science Fiction Society, Inc., or OSFS (pron:"Oss-Fuss") is a membership fan club in Ottawa, Ontario, Canada. It is the oldest continuously operating science fiction club in Ontario.

== Current activities ==
OSFS switched from formal monthly meetings in 2012 to informal dinner meetings. Other gatherings and outings are held on an irregular basis.

It publishes an amateur magazine called The OSFS Statement.

== History ==
OSFS was founded in 1977 by Marc "StarWolf" Gerin-LaJoie who was President for the first two years. Initial membership was around 150, and remained around a hundred for most of the first 15 years.

=== Stardock ===
Stardock - Edited by Charles R. Saunders was a science fiction fanzine that published fiction and articles by OSFS members, as well as local writers and artists. Some notable contributors besides Saunders were Galad Elflandsson and Charles de Lint all of whom went on to be professionally published writers.

=== Maplecon ===
Maplecon was Ottawa's first fullfledged science fiction convention, initially held at the Skyline Hotel blocks from Ottawa's Parliament Hill in October 1978. Started by StarWolf to give 'direction' to OSFS. It was co-chaired by Jocelyn "Bink" Tait and her husband Frank. In its second year, it merged with an event run by the local comics club, called the International Comic Collectors Club (aka I.C. Cubed), and comics joined the mix. This led to a rapid expansion of the convention. Maplecon grew to a membership of around a thousand attendees, with many notable guests from both science fiction and comics. This rapid growth caused concern about liability, and the "Committee for Change" was formed by a group of concerned members. Its aim was to convince OSFS to spawn off Maplecon as a separate organization so that if Maplecon failed catastrophically, it would not also sink OSFS. This also freed Maplecon from OSFS's control, which had a mixed outcome. An oversight corporation was formed called Ottawa Fandom Inc (aka OFI), and ownership of Maplecon was sold to OFI for one dollar. Eventually, without oversight by OSFS, the comics aspect overwhelmed the science fiction and fantasy written word aspect, and that spawned conventions to meet the wants and needs of the literary fans. First was Pinekone and later, CAN-CON. Another ramification of Maplecon's rapid growth was that it moved to Carleton University. Although this dramatically lowered the cost of the accommodations, it also dramatically lowered the quality of the accommodations. This became a frequent complaint, and is one of the reasons cited as why Maplecon lost attendance. The last Maplecon was number 13, held in 1992.
