= Polaris (convention) =

Science fiction convention

- Status: Inactive/No current event
- Genre: Science fiction/Fantasy
- Venue: Hotel and Convention centre
- Locations: General Toronto Area, Ontario
- Country: Canada
- Inaugurated: 1986
- Attendance: 2000+
- Organizer: TCON Promotional Society
- Filing status: Non-profit
- Website: http://polaris.tcon.ca/

Polaris (formerly Toronto Trek) was an annual science fiction and fantasy convention held in Toronto, Ontario, Canada and in Richmond Hill, Ontario, Canada.

It began in 1986 as a relaxacon as Toronto Trek Celebration. Two years later, in 1988, Toronto Trek Celebration 2 took place. In 1989 it dropped the word "Celebration" and became simply "Toronto Trek". For its twenty-first convention in 2007, the name was changed to "Polaris". At Polaris 26, held July 5–7, 2012, it was announced Polaris had come to an end and that a new convention would replace Polaris in 2013. The convention went from +5,000 weekend memberships (at one event—it never had that amount ever before or again) and mostly hovered between 1200 and 1700 members. The board felt extreme pressure due to rapid expansion of for profit events, and looked at various options, including running a Doctor Who event for the 50th Anniversary of Doctor Who, called Reversed Polarity. Increased hotel space costs and actor guests wanting larger audiences to make more money from autographs led the Board to realize the convention model as it stood was no longer viable. The not-for profit corporation still exists and could run events at any time. However, COVID-19 has also made the board reconsider running events.

The convention had a focus on media guests from science fiction, fantasy movies and television series and novel authors such as Star Trek, Babylon 5, Stargate, Doctor Who, Buffy the Vampire Slayer, Jericho, Lost and Battlestar Galactica. Photo opportunities, autographs and Question & Answer sessions feature the media guest, who sometimes come to other programming and after hours events.

Polaris was one of several activities run by the TCON Promotional Society by means of a convention committee of more than 100 people grouped into 38 individual teams, each taking care of a different part of the convention. The TCON Promotional Society has coordinated other events, such as the Canadian Conrunners Conference in 2004, Their other current project is the Constellation Awards, a fan-nominated, fan-voted set of Science Fiction Awards with focus on film and television science fiction. TCON hosted events are proposed to the TCON Board of Directors and voted upon by said Board. The TCON Promotional Society is a not-for-profit corporation based out of Toronto, Ontario, Canada.

== History ==
=== 2010s ===
==== Polaris 26 ====
July 6–8, 2012 · Sheraton Parkway Toronto North

- Wil Wheaton - Actor: Star Trek The Next Generation; Big Bang Theory
- Miracle Laurie - Actor: Dollhouse (replacing Dichen Lachman due to illness)
- Tony Amendola - Actor: Stargate SG1, Once Upon A Time
- Neil Grayston - Actor: Eureka, Wonderfalls, Warehouse 13
- Robert O'Reilly - Actor: Star Trek: TNG & DS9
- J. G. Hertzler - Actor: Star Trek: DS9

This was the last Polaris held.

==== Polaris 25 ====
July 15–17, 2011 · Sheraton Parkway Toronto North

- Ben Browder - Actor: Farscape; Stargate SG-1
- Armin Shimerman - Actor: Star Trek Deep Space Nine; Buffy the Vampire Slayer
- Adam Baldwin - Actor: Full Metal Jacket; Firefly and Serenity; Chuck
- Meaghan Rath - Actor: Being Human
- Melinda Clarke - Actor: Nikita, C.S.I., Vampire Diaries, Firefly, Return of the Living Dead III, Reaper, Xena
- Charlaine Harris - Author Guest of Honour: Sookie Stackhouse Novels that the HBO True Blood series is based on.
- Brandon Sanderson - Author Guest of Honour: The Way of the Kings and was also chosen by Robert Jordan's widow to complete The Wheel of Time Series.

(more to come)

==== Polaris 24 ====
July 16–18, 2010 · Sheraton Parkway Toronto North

- Robin Dunne - Actor: Sanctuary
- Alaina Huffman - Actor: Stargate Universe
- Kai Owen - Actor: Torchwood
- Ethan Phillips - Actor: Star Trek - Voyager
- Mark Sheppard - Actor: Battlestar Galactica
- Lindsay Wagner - Actor: Bionic Woman
- Robert J. Sawyer - Special Guest: Author
- Kelley Armstrong - Author Guest of Honour
- Author Guest: Stephanie Bedwell-Grime, Erik Buchanan, Eric Choi, John Robert Colombo, Julie E. Czerneda, Karen Dales, Gemma Files, Urania Fung, James Alan Gardner, Alyxandra Harvey, Matthew LeDrew, Derwin Mak, Violette Malan, David Nickle, Tony Pi, Michelle Rowen, Karl Schroeder, Douglas Smith, Dr. Robert Smith?, Rob St.Martin, Nikki Stafford, Kenneth Tam and Peter Watts
