= Aurora Awards =

Canadian literary award for speculative fiction

Aurora Award
- Awarded for: Best Canadian science fiction or fantasy works of previous year
- Presented by: Canadian SF and Fantasy Association; SFSF Boreal Inc
- First award: 1980; 46 years ago
- Website: csffa.ca

The Aurora Awards (French: Prix Aurora-Boréal) are a set of primarily literary awards given annually for the best Canadian science fiction or fantasy professional and fan works and achievements from the previous year. The event is organized by Canvention and the awards are given out by the Canadian SF and Fantasy Association and SFSF Boreal Inc. Originally they were known as the Canadian Science Fiction and Fantasy Awards which was shortened to CSFFA and nicknamed the Casper Awards based on that acronym, but this name was changed to the Aurora Awards in 1991, because the Aurora is the same in English and French. The categories have expanded from those focused on literary works to include categories that recognize achievements in comics, music, poetry, art, film and television.

Originally, the CSFFA gave out both the English-language and French-language versions of the awards, with the French-language version known as the Prix Aurora. However, the French-language section of the awards is now known as the Prix Aurora-Boréal and was created through an agreement between SFSFBI and the CSFFA in November 2010, which combined the independent Prix Boréal and the Prix Aurora into a single award affiliated to the English-language award. The awards are selected by member vote, in a similar style to that of the Hugo Awards.

The first award was granted in 1980 at Hal-Con 3, in Halifax, Nova Scotia, which was in turn the first convention to be named Canvention, a name which rotates to the convention hosting the awards that year in addition to its regular name.

Voting for the awards is done by members of the Canadian Science Fiction and Fantasy Association, who pay an annual fee of $10. Publishers cannot vote during the nomination or shortlist ballot, but can submit works by authors they represent without paying a fee.

== Award ==
The Canadian Science Fiction and Fantasy Association (CSFFA) and the SFSFBI give out the Aurora and Aurora-Boréal Awards for the best science fiction and fantasy works in each of the categories. CSFFA handle the anglophone Aurora Awards and the SFSFBI handle the francophone Aurora-Boréal Awards, though both organizations co-sponsor the other award. Nominees are only valid if they were produced or completed in the previous calendar year.

For the Aurora Awards, the official nominees are chosen by the awards committee from all of the works that have received at least 5 nominations by CSFFA members throughout the year, and then the shortlist is voted on by every member of the CSFFA. This is obtained through a $10 membership fee, and can be voted in person with a voting card at the annual general meeting of the CSFFA at that year's Canvention, or online through a portal set up by the CSFFA. A member must have been a member for at least 1 month before Canvention to be eligible for voting. The deadlines for voting are set by the CSFFA at the previous year's Canvention.

For a category to not have an award given for it, usually there has to be less than three eligible nominees in that category before the start of voting, or enough people have voted for the No Award option on the ballot, and this wins a majority.

The voting uses the instant-runoff voting method, where the voters rank their choices and the lowest scorer is eliminated until one nominee has a majority.

For the CSFFA Hall of Fame, the inductee must have been nominated for the trophy, and then selected by a 4-person jury, which is selected by the CSFFA each year.

== Current award categories ==
Medium	English-language award	French-language award
	Professional awards	
Novels	Best Novel	Meilleur roman
YA Novels	Best YA Novel	Meilleur roman
Other Literature	Best Related Work	Meilleurs ouvrages connexes
Comics	Best Graphic Novel	Meilleure bande dessinée
Short Fiction	Best Novelette/Novella	
Short Fiction	Best Short Fiction	Meilleure nouvelle
Poetry	Best Poem/Song	Meilleure nouvelle
Music	Best Poem/Song	Création artistique audiovisuelle
Film & Television	Best Visual Presentation (to 2022)	Création artistique audiovisuelle
Art	Best Cover Art/Interior Illustration	Création artistique audiovisuelle
Lifetime Achievement	Hall of Fame Trophy	
	Fan awards	
Writing/Publication	Best Fan Writing and Publications	Fanédition
Fan Organization	Best Fan Organizational (to 2022)	Fanédition
Other Works	Best Fan Related Work	Fanédition

== Recognition ==
CSFFA is a federally recognized Canadian non-profit, since 2011.
