= Philip K. Dick Award =

American annual award for science fiction novels

- Awarded for: The best science fiction paperback novel published in the United States in the previous calendar year
- Country: United States
- Presented by: Philadelphia Science Fiction Society, Philip K. Dick Trust, Northwest Science Fiction Society
- First award: 1983
- Website: philipkdickaward.org

The Philip K. Dick Award is an American science fiction award given annually at Norwescon and sponsored by the Philadelphia Science Fiction Society and (since 2005) the Philip K. Dick Trust. Named after science fiction writer Philip K. Dick, it has been awarded since 1983, the year after his death. It is awarded to the best original paperback published each year in the US.

The award was founded by Thomas Disch with assistance from David G. Hartwell, Paul S. Williams, and Charles N. Brown. As of 2025, it is administered by Caitlin Blasdell, Pat LoBrutto, Janna Silverstein, and Gordon Van Gelder. Past administrators include Algis Budrys, David G. Hartwell, and John SIlbersack.

== Winners and nominees ==
Winners are listed in bold.

The year in the table below indicates the year the winners are announced; this is the year after the novels were published.

Key
**Winner**
Special Citation

Year	Author	Title	Ref
1983	**Rudy Rucker**	**Software**	
1983	Ray Nelson	The Prometheus Man	
1983	J. M. Coetzee	Waiting for the Barbarians	
1983	R. A. Lafferty	Aurelia	
1983	John Sladek	Roderick	
1983	Steve Rasnic Tem	The Umbral Anthology of Science Fiction Poetry	
1984	**Tim Powers**	**The Anubis Gates**	
1984	R. A. MacAvoy	Tea with the Black Dragon	
1984	Barrington J. Bayley	The Zen Gun	
1984	Zoe Fairbairns	Benefits	
1984	M. John Harrison	The Floating Gods	
1984	John Varley	Millennium	
1985	**William Gibson**	**Neuromancer**	
1985	Kim Stanley Robinson	The Wild Shore	
1985	C. J. Cherryh	Voyager in Night	
1985	Geary Gravel	The Alchemists	
1985	David R. Palmer	Emergence	
1985	Lucius Shepard	Green Eyes	
1985	Lewis Shiner	Frontera	
1985	Howard Waldrop	Them Bones	
1986	**Tim Powers**	**Dinner at Deviant's Palace**	
1986	Richard Grant	Saraband of Lost Time	
1986	Russell Griffin	The Timeservers	
1986	Michael P. Kube-McDowell	Emprise	
1986	Barry N. Malzberg	The Remaking of Sigmund Freud	
1986	Scott Russell Sanders	Terrarium	
1986	Walter Jon Williams	Knight Moves	
1987	**James P. Blaylock**	**Homunculus**	
1987	Jack McDevitt	The Hercules Text	
1987	Karen Joy Fowler	Artificial Things	
1987	Robert Charles Wilson	A Hidden Place	
1988	**Patricia Geary**	**Strange Toys**	
1988	Mike McQuay	Memories	
1988	Richard Bowker	Dover Beach	
1988	Pat Cadigan	Mindplayers	
1988	K. W. Jeter	Dark Seeker	
1988	Rebecca Ore	Becoming Alien	
1988	Lucius Shepard	Life During Wartime	
1989	**Paul J. McAuley** (tie)	**Four Hundred Billion Stars**	
1989	**Rudy Rucker** (tie)	**Wetware**	
1989	Roger MacBride Allen	Orphan of Creation	
1989	Marc Laidlaw	Neon Lotus	
1989	David Alexander Smith	Rendezvous	
1990	**Richard Paul Russo**	**Subterranean Gallery**	
1990	Dave Wolverton	On My Way to Paradise	
1990	Barry B. Longyear	Infinity Hold	
1990	James Luceno	A Fearful Symmetry	
1990	Rebecca Ore	Being Alien	
1990	Susan Shwartz	Heritage of Flight	
1991	**Pat Murphy**	**Points of Departure**	
1991	Raymond Harris	The Schizogenic Man	
1991	Gregory Feeley	The Oxygen Barons	
1991	Elizabeth Hand	Winterlong	
1991	Allen Steele	Clarke County, Space	
1992	**Ian McDonald**	**King of Morning, Queen of Day**	
1992	Emma Bull	Bone Dance	
1992	Douglas Bell	Mojo and the Pickle Jar	
1992	Kathe Koja	The Cipher	
1992	Robert Charles Wilson	Bridge of Years	
1993	**Richard Grant**	**Through the Heart**	
1993	Élisabeth Vonarburg	In the Mothers' Land	
1993	Colin Greenland	Take Back Plenty	
1993	Elizabeth Hand	Aestival Tide	
1993	R. A. Lafferty	Iron Tears	
1994	**John M. Ford** (tie)	**Growing Up Weightless**	
1994	**Jack Womack** (tie)	**Elvissey**	
1994	Wilhelmina Baird	Crash Course	
1994	David R. Bunch	Bunch!	
1994	Elizabeth Hand	Icarus Descending	
1995	**Robert Charles Wilson**	**Mysterium**	
1995	Jack Cady	Inagehi	
1995	Alexander Besher	Rim: A Novel of Virtual Reality	
1995	Lisa Mason	Summer of Love	
1995	Ian McDonald	Scissors Cut Paper Wrap Stone	
1995	Lance Olsen	Tonguing the Zeitgeist	
1996	**Bruce Bethke**	**Headcrash**	
1996	Richard Paul Russo	Carlucci's Edge	
1996	Shale Aaron	Virtual Death	
1996	Greg Egan	Permutation City	
1996	Amy Thomson	The Color of Distance	
1996	Élisabeth Vonarburg	Reluctant Voyagers	
1997	**Stephen Baxter**	**The Time Ships**	
1997	Michael Bishop	At the City Limits of Fate	
1997	William Barton	The Transmigration of Souls	
1997	George Foy	The Shift	
1997	Sarah Zettel	Reclamation	
1998	**Stepan Chapman**	**The Troika**	
1998	William Barton	Acts of Conscience	
1998	Susan R. Matthews	An Exchange of Hostages	
1998	Richard Paul Russo	Carlucci's Heart	
1998	Denise Vitola	Opalite Moon	
1998	Catherine Wells	Mother Grimm	
1999	**Geoff Ryman**	**253: The Print Remix**	
1999	Paul Di Filippo	Lost Pages	
1999	Steve Aylett	Slaughtermatic	
1999	Nalo Hopkinson	Brown Girl in the Ring	
1999	Paul J. McAuley	The Invisible Country	
2000	**Stephen Baxter**	**Vacuum Diagrams**	
2000	Jamil Nasir	Tower of Dreams	
2000	Toni Anzetti	Typhon's Children	
2000	Constance Ash, ed.	Not of Woman Born	
2000	William Barton	When We Were Real	
2000	Kristine Smith	Code of Conduct	
2001	**Michael Marshall Smith**	**Only Forward**	
2001	Scott Westerfeld	Evolution's Darling	
2001	Stephen L. Burns	Call from a Distant Shore	
2001	Nalo Hopkinson	Midnight Robber	
2001	Maggy Thomas	Broken Time	
2001	Janine Ellen Young	The Bridge	
2002	**Richard Paul Russo**	**Ship of Fools**	
2002	Ken Wharton	Divine Intervention	
2002	Julie E. Czerneda	In the Company of Others	
2002	Mark W. Tiedemann	Compass Reach	
2002	Ray Vukcevich	Meet Me in the Moon Room	
2002	Liz Williams	The Ghost Sister	
2003	**Carol Emshwiller**	**The Mount**	
2003	China Miéville	The Scar	
2003	Carol Emshwiller	Report to the Men’s Club	
2003	Kay Kenyon	Maximum Ice	
2003	Karin Lowachee	Warchild	
2003	Liz Williams	Empire of Bones	
2003	Forrest Aguirre, Jeff VanderMeer (eds.)	Leviathan Three	
2004	**Richard K. Morgan**	**Altered Carbon**	
2004	Jane Jensen	Dante's Equation	
2004	M. M. Buckner	Hyperthought	
2004	Mark Budz	Clade	
2004	Chris Moriarty	Spin State	
2004	Ann Tonsor Zeddies	Steel Helix	
2005	**Gwyneth Jones**	**Life**	
2005	Lyda Morehouse	Apocalypse Array	
2005	Geoff Ryman	Air	
2005	Liz Williams	Banner of Souls	
2005	Karen Traviss	City of Pearl	
2005	Minister Faust	The Coyote Kings of the Space-Age Bachelor Pad	
2005	Eileen Gunn	Stable Strategies and Others	
2006	**M. M. Buckner**	**War Surf**	
2006	Justina Robson	Natural History	
2006	Neal Asher	Cowl	
2006	Karin Lowachee	Cagebird	
2006	Justina Robson	Silver Screen	
2006	Wil McCarthy	To Crush the Moon	
2007	**Chris Moriarty**	**Spin Control**	
2007	Elizabeth Bear	Carnival	
2007	Tony Ballantyne	Recursion	
2007	Mark Budz	Idolon	
2007	Andrea Hairston	Mindscape	
2007	Nina Kiriki Hoffman	Catalyst: A Novel of Alien Contact	
2007	Justina Robson	Living Next Door to the God of Love	
2008	**M. John Harrison**	**Nova Swing**	
2008	Minister Faust	From the Notebooks of Dr. Brain	
2008	Jon Armstrong	Grey	
2008	Elizabeth Bear	Undertow	
2008	Adam Roberts	Gradisil	
2008	Karen Traviss	Ally	
2008	Sean Williams	Saturn Returns	
2009	**Adam-Troy Castro** (tie)	**Emissaries from The Dead**	
2009	**David Walton** (tie)	**Terminal Mind**	
2009	Lou Anders	Fast Forward 2	
2009	K. A. Bedford	Time Machines Repaired While-U-Wait	
2009	Jeff Carlson	Plague War	
2009	Karen Traviss	Judge	
2010	**C. L. Anderson**	**Bitter Angels**	
2010	Ian McDonald	Cyberabad Days	
2010	Carlos J. Cortes	The Prisoner	
2010	Eric Garcia	The Repossession Mambo	
2010	Daryl Gregory	The Devil's Alphabet	
2010	Rebecca Ore	Centuries Ago and Very Fast	
2010	S. Andrew Swann	Prophets	
2011	**Mark Hodder**	**The Strange Affair of Spring-Heeled Jack**	
2011	Project Itoh (trans. Alexander O. Smith)	Harmony	
2011	Jon Armstrong	Yarn	
2011	Elizabeth Bear	Chill	
2011	Alden Bell	The Reapers are the Angels	
2011	Sara Creasy	Song of Scarabaeus	
2011	James Knapp	State of Decay	
2012	**Simon Morden**	**The Samuil Petrovitch Trilogy**	
2012	Robert Jackson Bennett	The Company Man	
2012	Mira Grant	Deadline	
2012	Matthew Hughes	The Other	
2012	Jean Johnson	A Soldier's Duty	
2012	Drew Magary	The Postmortal	
2012	Maureen F. McHugh	After the Apocalypse	
2013	**Brian Francis Slattery**	**Lost Everything**	
2013	Andri Snær Magnason	LoveStar	
2013	Ryan Boudinot	Blueprints of the Afterlife	
2013	Keith Brooke	Harmony	
2013	Eric Brown	Helix Wars	
2013	Moira Crone	The Not Yet	
2013	Nancy Kress	Fountain of Age: Stories	
2014	**Ben H. Winters**	**Countdown City**	
2014	Toh EnJoe	Self-Reference Engine	
2014	Anne Charnock	A Calculated Life	
2014	Cassandra Rose Clarke	The Mad Scientist’s Daughter	
2014	Ann Leckie	Ancillary Justice	
2014	Jack Skillingstead	Life on the Preservation	
2014	Ian Whates (ed.)	Solaris Rising 2: The New Solaris Books of Science Fiction	
2015	**Meg Elison**	**The Book of the Unnamed Midwife**	
2015	Jennifer Marie Brissett	Elysium	
2015	Rod Duncan	The Bullet-Catcher’s Daughter	
2015	Emmi Itäranta	Memory of Water	
2015	Cherie Priest	Maplecroft: The Borden Dispatches	
2015	Jonathan Strahan (ed.)	Reach for Infinity	
2016	**Ramez Naam**	**Apex**	
2016	Marguerite Reed	Archangel	
2016	Brenda Cooper	Edge of Dark	
2016	Douglas Lain	After the Saucers Landed	
2016	PJ Manney	(R)evolution	
2016	Adam Rakunas	Windswept	
2017	**Claudia Casper**	**The Mercy Journals**	
2017	Susan diRende	Unpronounceable	
2017	Kristy Acevedo	Consider	
2017	Eleanor Arnason	Hwarhath Stories: Transgressive Tales by Aliens	
2017	Matt Hill	Graft	
2017	Yoss	Super Extra Grande	
2018	**Carrie Vaughn**	**Bannerless**	
2018	Deji Bryce Olukotun	After the Flare	
2018	Meg Elison	The Book of Etta	
2018	Mur Lafferty	Six Wakes	
2018	Tim Pratt	The Wrong Stars	
2018	Alastair Reynolds	Revenger	
2018	Martha Wells	All Systems Red	
2019	**Audrey Schulman**	**Theory of Bastards**	
2019	Claire North	84K	
2019	Ian McDonald	Time Was	
2019	Jeff Noon	The Body Library	
2019	Abbey Mei Otis	Alien Virus Love Disaster: Stories	
2019	Vandana Singh	Ambiguity Machines and Other Stories	
2020	**Sarah Pinsker**	**Sooner or Later Everything Falls into the Sea**	
2020	Sarah Tolmie	The Little Animals	
2020	Ada Hoffmann	The Outside	
2020	Megan E. O'Keefe	Velocity Weapon	
2020	Susan Palwick	All Worlds Are Real: Short Fictions	
2020	Tade Thompson	The Rosewater Redemption	
2021	**Alison Stine**	**Road Out of Winter**	
2021	M. R. Carey	The Book of Koli	
2021	Christopher Brown	Failed State	
2021	Elwin Cotman	Dance on Saturday	
2021	Alastair Reynolds	Bone Silence	
2021	Adrian Tchaikovsky	The Doors of Eden	
2022	**Kali Wallace**	**Dead Space**	
2022	Lavie Tidhar	The Escapement	
2022	Nino Cipri	Defekt	
2022	Jason Sanford	Plague Birds	
2022	Giacomo Sartori	Bug	
2022	Tade Thompson	Far from the Light of Heaven	
2023	**Kimberly Unger**	**The Extractionist**	
2023	Tade Thompson	The Legacy of Molly Southbourne	
2023	Rebecca Campbell	Arboreality	
2023	C. J. Carey	Widowland	
2023	Rich Larson	Ymir	
2023	Rachel Swirsky	January Fifteenth	
2024	**Bethany Jacobs**	**These Burning Stars**	
2024	Rebekah Bergman	The Museum of Human History	
2024	Eugen Bacon	Danged Black Thing	
2024	M. R. Carey	Infinity Gate	
2024	S. L. Coney	Wild Spaces	
2024	Dilman Dila	Where Rivers Go to Die	
2025	**Brenda Peynado**	**Time's Agent**	
2025	Adrian Tchaikovsky	Alien Clay	
2025	Tara Campbell	City of Dancing Gargoyles	
2025	Bora Chung	Your Utopia: Stories	
2025	Sofia Samatar	The Practice, the Horizon, and the Chain	
2025	Subodhana Wijeyeratne	Triangulum	
2026	**M. R. Carey**	**Outlaw Planet**	
2026	Thomas Ha	Uncertain Sons and Other Stories	
2026	William Alexander	Sunward: A Novel	
2026	Koji A. Dae	Casual	
2026	Caspar Geon	The Immeasurable Heaven	
2026	Christopher Hinz	Scales	
2026	Oliver K. Langmead and Aliya Whiteley	City of All Seasons	
