= Clade (disambiguation) =

Clade is a phylogenetic group.

Clade may also refer to:

- Clade (novel), 2003 science fiction novel by Mark Budz
- Emil Clade, Luftwaffe flying ace in World War II

== See also ==
- Cladistics
- Cladogram
- Subclade (disambiguation)
- Grade (biology), often contrasted with clade
- Taxon
