= Richard Bowker =

Richard Bowker may refer to:

- Richard Bowker (Australian businessman) (1815–1903), Australian physician, surgeon and politician
- Richard Bowker (British businessman) (born 1966), former chief executive of National Express Group and former chairman and chief executive of the Strategic Rail Authority
- Richard Rogers Bowker (1848–1933), American journalist and founder of the R.R. Bowker Company
- Richard Bowker (writer) (born 1950), American writer of crime and science fiction
