= Caged Bird =

A caged bird is a bird kept in a birdcage.

Caged Bird may also refer to:

- "Caged Bird", a song by Alicia Keys on her 2001 album Songs in A Minor
- "Caged Bird" (Wonderfalls), a 2004 episode of the TV dramedy Wonderfalls
- The Caged Bird, a 1913 American silent short drama film
- "Caged Bird," a poem by Maya Angelou (not be confused with her memoir I Know Why the Caged Bird Sings)

== See also ==
- Cagebird (novel), a 2005 novel by Karin Lowachee
- CAG bird, a specially painted aircraft flown by the commanding officer of United States Navy Carrier Air Groups
