= Jeff Carlson =

Jeff Carlson may refer to:

- Jeff Carlson (ice hockey) (born 1953)
- Jeff Carlson (American football) (born 1966)
- Jeff Carlson (author) (born 1969)
