= Julio and Marisol =

US public-service advertising campaign

- First two frames of Episode 1
- Agency: Conill
- Client: New York City Department of Health
- Market: New York City
- Language: Spanish / English
- Media: Print
- Title: La Decisión / Decision
- Product: AIDS education (public service)
- Release date: 1989–2001

Julio and Marisol were the protagonists in a bilingual public-service advertising campaign (officially titled Decision in English or La Decisión in Spanish but commonly known by the characters' names) that ran from 1989 to 2001 in the New York City Subway. The focus of the campaign was promoting condom use to prevent AIDS. The well-known catchphrase was a line from the first installment, in which Marisol sobs, "I love you, but not enough to die for you".

The storyline, told in comic format in a style similar to a telenovela, follows a young Hispanic couple as they explore human sexuality and the effects of the AIDS epidemic on their relationship. The campaign was designed to appeal to a Hispanic audience, who were considered particularly at risk due to cultural attitudes that discouraged condom use. With action covering just a few days, the story was told at a rate of about one episode per year. The campaign has been described as "one part steamy soap opera, one part language instruction, and two parts AIDS education service".

The ads were praised by public health officials for presenting the educational material through situations that people could relate to their own lives, and by AIDS activists for breaking down the social stigma associated with the disease. They drew criticism, however, from family-values advocates who objected to the promotion of condoms and the tacit acceptance of homosexuality. Others objected to the stereotyping of Hispanics and the absence of gay or black characters. The artistic style of the drawings met with mixed reviews.

== Background ==
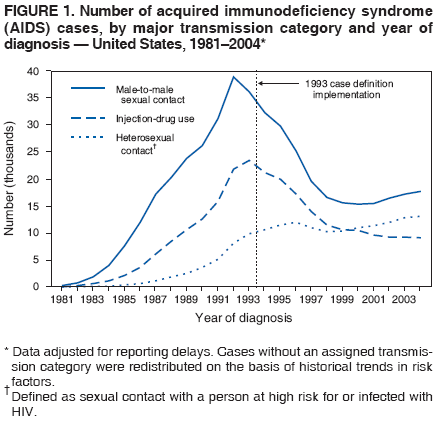
Number of AIDS cases in the United States between 1981 and 2004

Acquired immunodeficiency syndrome (AIDS) was identified in 1981 when clusters of rare diseases such as Kaposi's sarcoma and Pneumocystis pneumonia were reported in gay men in New York, the San Francisco Bay Area, and Los Angeles. The outbreaks eventually grew into a pandemic. Over the next decade, New York became the major locus of infection in the United States, with epidemiologists estimating that half of the gay men and three-fifths of the injection drug users in the city were infected. A 2018 New York Times retrospective said that the 105 diagnosed cases and 34 deaths by the end of June 1981 were one of the "events that transformed the city".

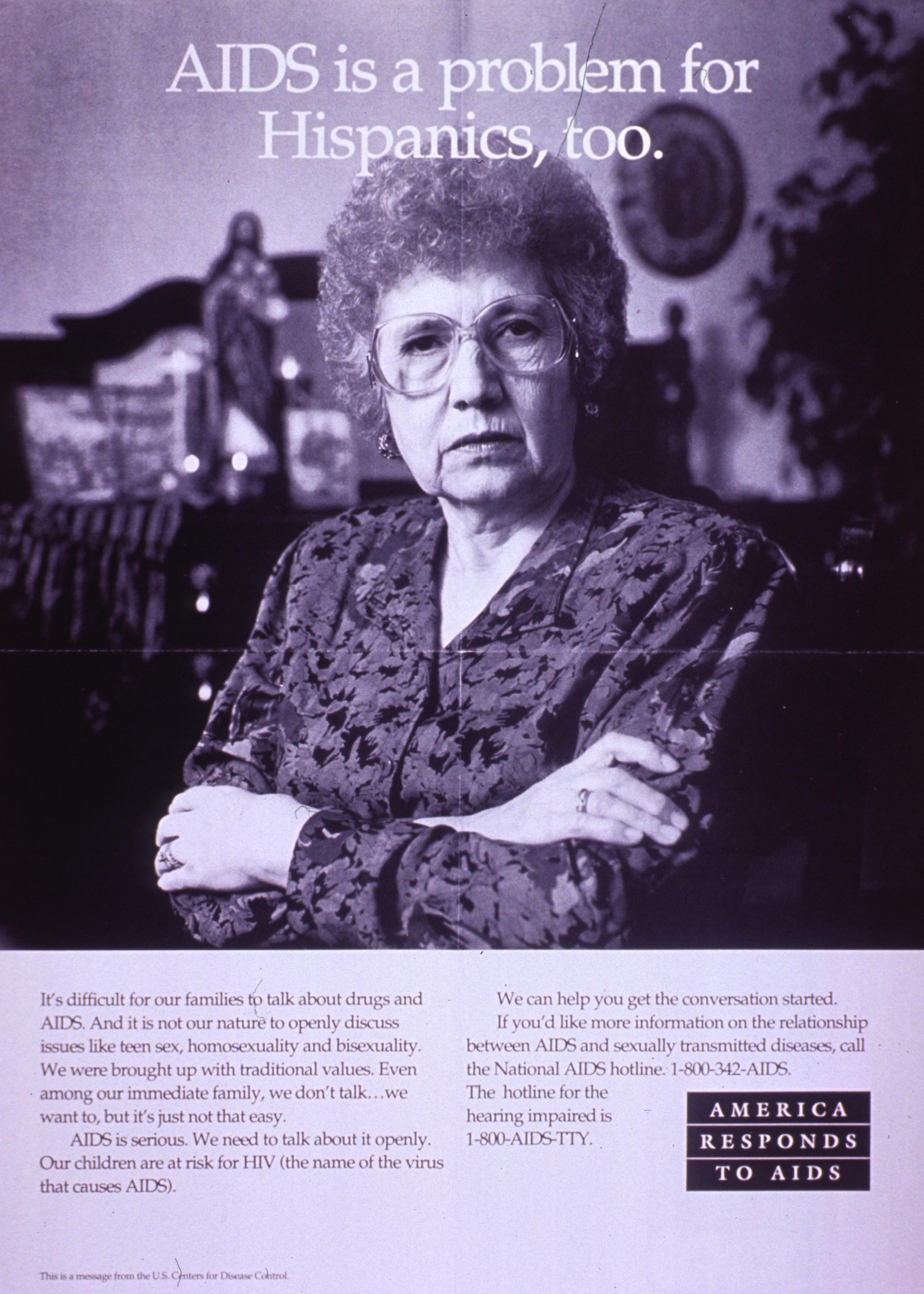
CDC education poster c. 1980s

As early as 1987, using condoms and limiting sexual intercourse to uninfected partners were found to be effective ways to limit the spread of the disease. In 1988, the United States Centers for Disease Control (CDC) distributed 126 million copies of an educational pamphlet Understanding AIDS, including one for every household in the country. The pamphlet noted that "Condoms are the best preventive measure against AIDS besides not having sex and practicing safe behavior."

Certain cultural norms, however, inhibited condom use in the Hispanic population. Annette Ramirez, executive director of the Hispanic AIDS Forum, said "Gender relations take a different tone and tenor with Hispanics ... Machismo is prevalent and women are not taught to talk about sex, and also are not socialized to being confrontational to ask their partner to wear a condom." Hispanics often grew up in the Catholic Church, where a doctrine of monogamy, abstinence from premarital relations, and prohibition of artificial birth control made discussion about condom use taboo. Additional factors included limited English language proficiency and poverty among recent immigrants, both of which reduced their access to healthcare and information about the disease.

The cultural issues led to an advertising campaign specifically designed to reach the Hispanic audience in New York City with the series published simultaneously in Spanish and English. Officially titled Decision in English and La Decisión in Spanish, it was more popularly known as Julio and Marisol, after the two main characters.

The action played out in slow motion, with nine episodes posted in subway cars at a rate of approximately one per year. This leisurely pace became a defining feature: In his 1997 novel The Shift, George Foy describes his protagonist riding the subway, reading an episode of Julio and Marisol, and thinking that he had been watching one of the characters dying of AIDS for longer than the lifespan of some inner-city children. For World AIDS Day 2023, the New York Transit Museum posted a retrospective noting that "The campaign's long run meant that riders became invested in the story; interpersonal tension between characters lasted years in the minds of New Yorkers". Paul Baumann, writing for the liberal Catholic magazine Commonweal, called it an "interminable AIDS soap opera".

== Storyline ==
Typical installation

The story follows two young lovers while they confront the dangers of unprotected sex during the AIDS epidemic. Vivian Toy of The New York Times called it "a tale of passion and betrayal in the age of AIDS."

The protagonists are an unmarried Hispanic couple in their 20s, living in New York City. David Hinckley of the New York Daily News described Marisol as "a pretty girl" and her boyfriend Julio as "a nice-looking boy", both with healthy sexual desires. Heterosexual HIV transmission, homosexuality, serial transmission through multiple sexual partners, intravenous drug use, and condom use were all explored through frank discussions between the protagonists and their circle of friends and relatives.

=== Day 1 ===
Episodes 1–6 take place in a single evening. The story opens with the couple getting ready to have sex for the first time (episode 1). Marisol insists that Julio use a condom, pleading "I love you, but not enough to die for you". Julio is offended by the suggestion and storms out.

After leaving Marisol (episode 2), Julio goes to see his friends Marco and Miguel. Julio brushes off Marisol's concerns ("Do I look like I need to use a condom?") and then discovers that both of his friends use them. Miguel laments that his cousin Anita has recently died of AIDS and her partner Raul is very sick, speculating that condom use might have saved them both. In parallel, Marisol calls her friend Iris (episode 3), who tells her about Anita and Raul. Marisol visits Raul at the hospital, where he urges her to protect against infection ("Don't let this happen to you and Julio").

Julio leaves Marco and Miguel and encounters his younger brother, Luisito, with some of his friends (episode 4). They are going to meet some women. Julio lectures them about condom use, to which Luisito replies that they learned about AIDS and condoms in school ("Don't worry Julio, we're cool"). Julio is then seen alone, thinking how smart his kid brother is, and realizing he needs to talk with Marisol.

Back at Raul's hospital room (episode 5) Julio shows up and apologizes to Marisol ("I was dumb wrong"). They profess their love for each other and leave. Rosa enters and tells Raul that she is HIV positive. Raul has just asked Rosa if she has told Julio when Julio and Marisol return. Rosa is introduced to Marisol as an old friend of Raul's (episode 6). Julio again leaves with Marisol, and tells her that Rosa is just somebody he knew from the old neighborhood. Meanwhile, back in the hospital room, Raul urges Rosa to let Julio know she is HIV positive ("You don't have to feel ashamed").

=== Day 2 ===
Episodes 7 and 8 take place another day when Julio and Marisol are apparently reunited.

In the morning, Julio leaves for work (episode 7), and Marisol telephones Iris again. In this conversation, Marisol discovers that Rosa was not just a casual acquaintance of Julio's, but actually a past lover ("Julio, you lied to me"). She confronts Julio about his lying (episode 8). Julio protests that it was a long time ago, and Marisol says she wants to go see Rosa. Meanwhile, Rosa has seen a counselor and is ready to talk to Julio about being HIV positive. Julio and Marisol go to Rosa's apartment, where Rosa tells them both that she is HIV positive ("I don't know how it happened ... or with whom"). Marisol wonders if Julio is also positive.

=== The story continues ===
A ninth episode takes place after Raul's death. Due to production issues, it never ran on the subway, leading The New York Times to call it "The Lost Episode". The thoughts of friends and family at the funeral are shown. A man wonders if he should get tested for HIV. Another man is determined this will never happen to him. A woman laments that Raul's womanizing and drug use finally caught up with him. A priest remembers Raul as an altar boy. The funeral director observes that he never had so many funerals for young people before the AIDS epidemic.

The documented history of the campaign is incomplete after episode 9. In April 1999, an untitled episode 12 on the NYC Health blog shows Julio having a conversation with an HIV counselor after having had an HIV test which showed him to be negative. The conversation covers what Julio needs to do to remain negative, and touches on the fact that Julio's brother is gay. Julio calls Marisol to tell her that he tested negative. Episode 13 was announced in August 1999.

In episode 15, Marisol's HIV-positive sister Dolores is pregnant. A doctor gives her a prescription saying it will protect her and her unborn child. Marisol and Dolores discuss options for informing the father, Manny. When Dolores visits Manny to tell him, he offers her drugs, which she refuses ("I didn't come here to get high. I came here to talk."). The episode was posted in 2024 on the New York City Transit Museum's Instagram.

=== Suggestions from readers ===
Proposals for new episodes were welcomed from readers. Episode 2 included a request for ideas which resulted in over 100 people sending in suggestions ranging from the romantic to the off-beat. One reader wanted to see Marisol have a failed relationship with a South American dictator only to reunite on the rebound with Julio, who by then would be working in a pet salon where Marisol brought her poodle for grooming. Another had Julio contracting HIV from a prostitute and confessing his indiscretion to Marisol, who then ends both their lives in a murder–suicide. Most of the suggestions, however, wanted to see the couple apologize and get back together.

== Production history ==
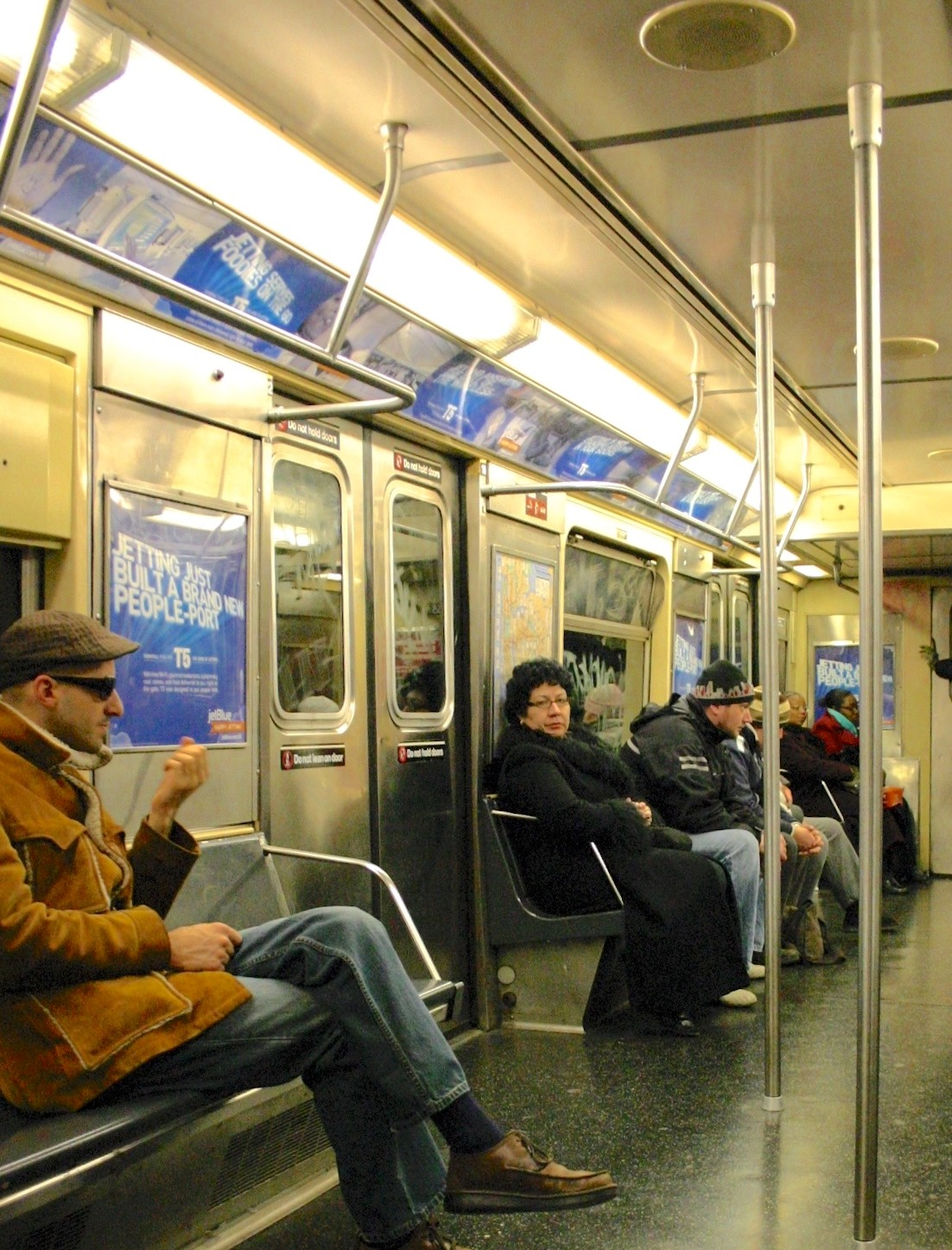
Interior of a subway car, typical of New York City Subway rolling stock while the Julio and Marisol campaign was running. The row of posters above the windows (partially obscured by grab rails) is where the ads would have run.

The campaign ran in the New York City Subway – and also on Metropolitan Transportation Authority (MTA) buses – from 1989 to 2001. Initially funded by a $60,000 (equivalent to $135,000 in 2025) grant from the CDC, it has since appeared in both print and radio versions and been printed on T-shirts. Episodes 1–9 were republished (in two editions with different cover art) as a bound comic book with the original graphical content rearranged to fit the book format.

The campaign was best known for the print ads that ran in as many as 6,000 subway cars. Ads ran above the car windows and doors, in a horizontal 11-by-44-inch (28 cm × 110 cm) format known as an "interior car card". There were two cards per car (one in each language) with a three month run. Each card contained a single episode consisting of about six frames of the story plus one which contained an information block with a phone number to call for more information.

Work began in spring of 1989 with Stephanie Siefken, a native of Colombia and the Health Department's cross-cultural affairs director, assigned to the project. With the help of focus groups, the Health Department determined that a photo-novella would be the best format for the target audience. This hybrid of a comic strip and a telenovela had been shown to be effective in health education.

The first episode was contracted to Conill, a Latino marketing agency. Subsequent episodes were managed internally by the Health Department using freelance artists. Publication spanned the mayoralties of David Dinkins and Rudy Giuliani, with Margaret Hamburg serving as Commissioner of Health under both administrations and assistant health commissioner Ann Sternberg managing the series. Jeffrey Escoffier worked on the project as the Health Department's deputy director of the Office of Gay and Lesbian Health.

In 1994, shortly after the release of episodes 6 and 7, Health Department spokesperson Steve Matthews said that the series was originally intended to run only in Spanish but that English versions were provided in response to popular demand. He also noted that the department gauged the popularity of the series based on feedback from the advertising agency about the large number that were stolen. According to Matthews, there was a three– or four–month lead time from when an idea for an episode was adopted to when the ads could be placed and the series would continue for as long as they saw interest.

=== Production gaps ===
In 1995, a new advertising policy was instituted for the subway; most cars were reserved for high-budget advertisers who could purchase all the space on each side of the car, with 20% of the cars reserved for smaller advertisers. Gannett Outdoor, who handled the MTA's advertising business, made the changes to provide additional space for the more profitable national advertising. Sternberg felt that the ad placement imposed by this new policy would be inappropriate for the campaign, saying that she "categorically refused to occupy that space", because "she didn't want Julio and Marisol appearing among ads aimed at hemorrhoid sufferers or people with foot-odor problems". As a result, the series was halted, with eight episodes having been published, and a ninth already prepared. The series returned in 1997 when negotiations between the Health Department and the MTA provided a path for the spots to appear in 60% of the subway's cars.

There was an additional two-year gap before the 1999 episode appeared. The delay was partly because work was being done on other campaigns and partly because the Health Department had not yet decided what the result of Julio's HIV test should be. At the time, Health Commissioner Neal L. Cohen announced that AIDS mortality was down due to the introduction of effective treatments. He added, however, that young people were becoming complacent about employing safe sexual practices so there was an increased need for education about how to prevent infection and he thus wanted to speed up release of installments. He also said that the department was working on a new campaign featuring a character named Lydia, to teach people about chlamydia.

== Reception ==
=== Popularity ===
The series became sufficiently well known to be used as translation practice text in courses teaching English as a second language to Spanish speakers. Stella Bugbee wrote in The Cut that the series was one of the "ubiquitous faces of the MTA". The Cooper Hewitt Museum, a branch of the Smithsonian Institution specializing in design, has the series in their permanent collection, and it was featured in the National Library of Medicine's "AIDS is Not Over" exhibition.

Health Department Associate Commissioner Steven Mathews said in 1993 that the department had received hundreds of letters asking for reprints and "Without question, this has been one of the most acclaimed – if not the most acclaimed – that we've ever produced, maybe that anybody has ever produced." Requests for reprints came from not just New York; letters were received from across the United States as well as Japan, India, and Australia. In addition to the official requests for copies, many people simply helped themselves; according to Adweek, the Julio and Marisol campaign spots were the subway's most frequently stolen poster.

=== Educational aspects ===
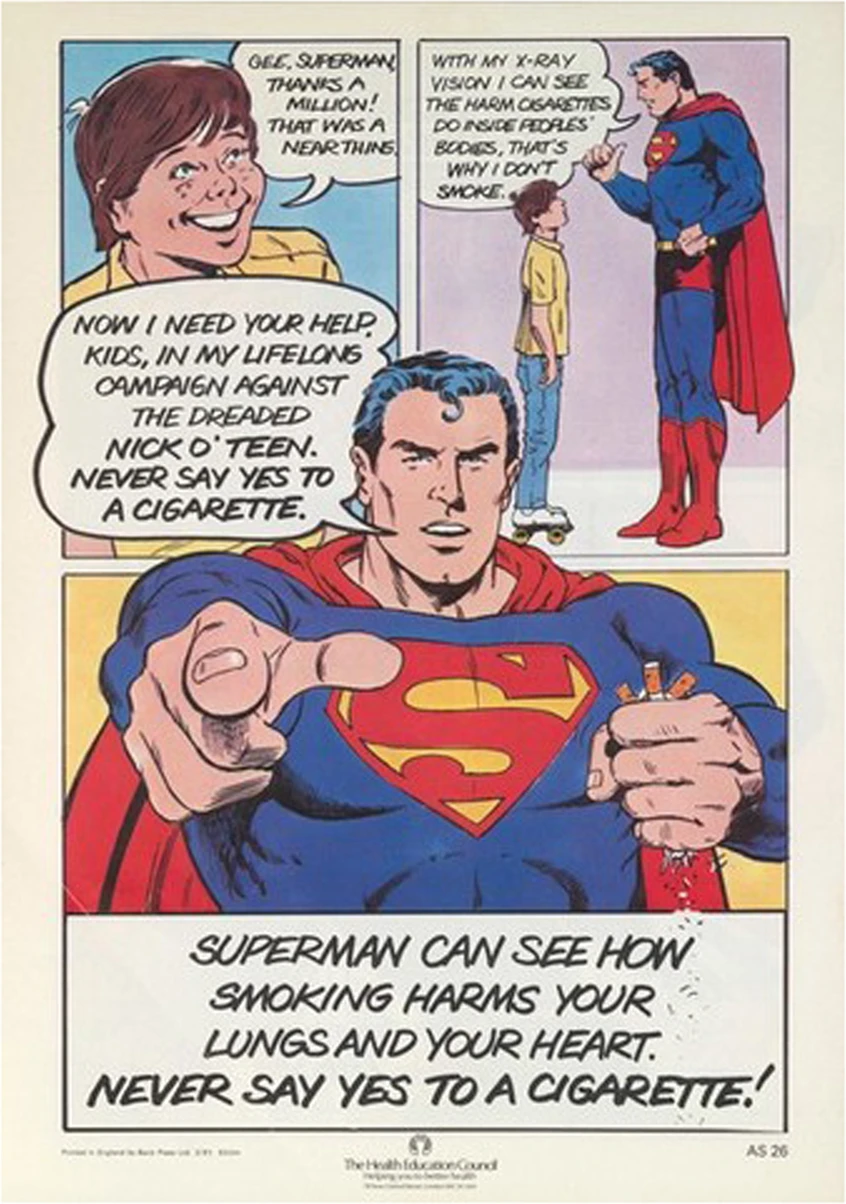
Julio and Marisol is one of several uses of the comics medium to provide public health education. The Superman comic was used in a British anti-smoking campaign in the 1980s.

According to Ginny Roth, a curator in the History of Medicine Division at the National Library of Medicine, there is a long history of using comic books for health education. Compared to textbooks which can be "boring, too advanced, or conceptually difficult ... to understand", comics offer "exciting narratives, panels that are easy to follow ... brevity of text, easily understood language, and relatability". Examples include a Ben Casey series about a young drug addict; Incredible Hulk character Jim Wilson, who has AIDS; a Justice League issue which teaches children how to use prescription medicines safely; and Dennis the Menace educating children about poisons in the home. Roth said that the same attributes which make comic books work in a child's classroom also make Julio and Marisol effective with the broader population. By 1995, the Health Department had received thousands of letters from readers thanking the protagonists for educating them about unsafe sex.

James Baron of The New York Times described the series as "one part steamy soap opera, one part language instruction, and two parts AIDS education service". Matthew Schneier of New York Magazine called it an "HIV melodrama". In 1997, acting Health Commissioner Benjamin Mojica said, "The situations in the story are the kinds which people may see themselves in, situations which people can relate to." Librarians Kristine Alpi and Barbara Bibel cited Julio and Marisol as an example of educational materials which could be included in a library collection aimed at providing health information to a diverse population. Miguelina Maldonado, Hispanic AIDS Forum's executive director, admitted there was value in educational campaigns but said it was not enough because "they don't address the skills needed to carry out risk-reduction behavior."

=== Social impact ===
In The Art of AIDS, Rob Baker argues that incorporation of AIDS into artistic works helps to break down the social stigma surrounding the disease and focus attention on it as a medical and personal problem. He uses Julio and Marisol, the inclusion of an HIV-positive character in Doonesbury, and television shows from sitcoms to dramas as examples. In a 2007 guide to LGBT comics, Jennifer Camper said that Julio and Marisol included all the essential elements of the telenovela genre: "melodrama, illness, love, death, tears, suspense, hot babes, and handsome men".

The series drew the disapproval of family-values advocates. In 1993, Howard Hurwitz, chairman of the Family Defense Council, objected to the promotion of condom use and said that blame should be placed on the gay community for AIDS: "The message is misleading and endangers public health ... Nothing has been said thus far about homosexuals who are largely responsible for the killer disease". He described the effect of the comic strip as "to titillate, not educate", and disputed the statement that condoms prevent AIDS. The council began a protest campaign, asking people to write to the Health Department and the MTA to urge that the series be given a more "family-oriented" message or removed from the subway. In response, MTA press secretary John Cunningham said the MTA had no plans to stop running the campaign: "We're for more speech, not less ... If Mr. Hurwitz would like to post his message in the subway, we have plenty of advertising space for sale. He can even apply for a [low cost] public-service-announcement spot. His group might be eligible."

In a 2000 National Review essay, Richard Brookhiser noted the lack of gay or black characters, which he labeled as "tactful omissions". According to David Hinckley, while public-service advertising of the 1990s had in general responded to New York's growing multilingual population by running bilingual campaigns, Julio and Marisol in particular was criticized because it stereotyped Latino men as letting their machismo lead them into making poor decisions. Annette Ramirez, however, said that was exactly the point they were trying to make. Ramirez explained that the characters were deliberately written to be generic, with the storyline omitting any personal details, to make as many readers as possible believe the story applied to them.

=== Artistic commentary ===
Brookhiser objected to the quality of the drawings, saying that the characters move "with mannequin stiffness", comparing the imagination displayed in the frames to mug shots. Art critic Arthur Danto, however, described the characters as "marvelously drawn".
