= Dover Beach (disambiguation) =

"Dover Beach" is a poem by Matthew Arnold.

Dover Beach may also refer to:

- Dover Beach (novel), a 1987 novel by Richard Bowker

== See also ==
- Dover Beaches North, New Jersey
- Dover Beaches South, New Jersey
