= Till Human Voices Wake Us =

Till Human Voices Wake Us may refer to:

- "Till human voices wake us, and we drown", the final line in the poem "The Love Song of J. Alfred Prufrock" by T.S. Eliot
- Till Human Voices Wake Us (film), an Australian film starring Guy Pearce and Helena Bonham Carter
- Till Human Voices Wake Us, a science fiction novel by Mark Budz
- a short story by Lewis Shiner
- a short story by Lisa Tuttle
- Until Human Voices Wake Us And We Drown, a boxed set collection of five 10" vinyl records released by Norwegian record label Rune Grammofon
