= Alison Stine =

American poet and author

- Born: January 25, 1978 (age 48); Indiana, U.S.
- Education: Denison University (BA); University of Maryland (MFA); Ohio University (PhD)
- Occupation: Writer
- Children: 1
- Writing career
- Language: English
- Years active: 1997-present
- Genres: Poetry, fiction, nonfiction, essay
- Notable work: Road Out of Winter (2020)
- Notable awards: Philip K. Dick Award (2021)
- Website: www.alisonstine.com

Alison Stine is an American poet and author whose first novel Road Out of Winter won the 2021 Philip K. Dick Award. Her poetry and nonfiction has been published in a number of newspapers and magazines including The New York Times, The Washington Post, The Paris Review, and Tin House.

== Life ==
Stine was born in rural Indiana and raised in Mansfield, Ohio, but spent most of her adult life in Appalachia in southern Ohio, a setting which she says heavily influences her writings and her life. Stine has been partially deaf since birth. She now lives in Colorado.

Stine worked as an academic for a number of years, previously serving as the Emerging Writer Lecturer at Gettysburg College, and has taught at Fordham University, Grand Valley State University, Denison University, and Ohio University. She is also a former child actor and her plays have been performed at the Cleveland Playhouse, the International Thespian Festival, and Off-Broadway for Stephen Sondheim's Young Playwrights Inc. Urban Retreat.

== Education ==
- Denison University (B.A.)
- University of Maryland (M.F.A.), in poetry
- Ohio University (PhD)

== Writings ==
Stine regularly writes The New York Times, The Washington Post, The Atlantic, The Guardian, and other publications. Her poetry has been published in a number of literary journals including AGNI Online, Poetry, and Prairie Schooner, while her nonfiction has appeared in Phoebe, Santa Clara Review, Sycamore Review, and Virginia Quarterly Review. Her short fiction has been published in journals and magazines including The Antioch Review, The Paris Review, SmokeLong Quarterly, Swink, and Tin House.

Her essay "On Poverty", a commentary on classism in the writing world published in 2016 in The Kenyon Review, went viral.

Her first novel, Road Out of Winter, focuses on working-class women in rural Ohio dealing with climate change in a post-apocalyptic landscape in what Library Journal says "blends a rural thriller and speculative realism into what could be called dystopian noir." The novel won the 2020 Philip K. Dick Award.

== Awards ==
=== Literary awards ===
- 2010 Brittingham Prize in Poetry for Wait
- 2021 Philip K. Dick Award for Road Out of Winter

=== Honors ===
- 2008 Ruth Lilly Fellowship from he Poetry Foundation.
- Individual Artist Fellowship from the National Endowment for the Arts (NEA)
- Stegner Fellowship from Stanford University.

== Bibliography ==
=== Novels and fiction ===
- —— (2015). Supervision (mass market paperback ed.). HarperVoyager. pp. 1–252. ISBN 9780008120702.
- —— (2016). The Protectors (kindle ed.). pp. 1–85. ASIN B01N658N3Y.
- —— (2020). Road Out of Winter (paperback ed.). MIRA / HarperCollins. pp. 1–315. ISBN 9780778309925.
- —— (2021). Trashlands (hardcover ed.). MIRA / HarperCollins. pp. 1–384. ISBN 9780778311270.

=== Collections of poetry ===
- —— (2001). Lot of My Sister (chapbook ed.). Kent: Kent State University Press. pp. 1–25. ISBN 9780873387057.
- —— (2009). Ohio Violence (paperback ed.). Denton: University of North Texas Press. pp. 1–80. ISBN 9781574412581.
- —— (2011). Wait (paperback ed.). Madison: University of Wisconsin Press. pp. 1–88. ISBN 9780299283148.

=== Anthologized works ===
- "Waste" (poem). Satellite Convulsions: Poems from Tin House. Eds. Brenda Shaughnessy, CJ Evans. Portland: Tin House Books, 2008.
- "Ring of Fire" (essay). Literary Cash: Writings Inspired by the Legendary Johnny Cash. Ed. Bob Batchelor. Dallas: Benbella Books, 2007.
- "Stranger", "Passage" (poems). Shooting the Rat. Eds. Mark Pawlak, Dick Lourie, Ron Schreiber, Robert Hershon. New York: Hanging Loose Press, 2003.
- "Wind" (poem ). Luna, Luna: Creative Writing Ideas from Spanish and Latino Literature. Ed. Julio Marzan. New York: Teachers and Writers Collaborative, 1997.
