= Burndive =

2003 novel by Karin Lowachee

Burdive
- First edition
- Author: Karin Lowachee
- Cover artist: Matt Stawicki
- Language: English
- Genre: Speculative fiction
- Publisher: Warner Aspect
- Publication date: October 1, 2003
- Publication place: United States
- Media type: Print (paperback)
- Pages: 432 pp
- ISBN: 9780446613187
- OCLC: 53449034
- LC Class: CPB Box no. 2267 vol. 7
- Preceded by: Warchild
- Followed by: Cagebird

Burndive is a science fiction novel by Karin Lowachee. It was first published in 2003 by Warner Aspect. Burndive is the second book in Lowachee's Warchild Universe.

== Plot summary ==
Ryan Azarcon lives in a fishbowl. He is the son of the infamous Captain Cairo Azarcon, of the deep space carrier ship Macedon and Songlian Lau, Austro Station's head of publicity. Because of his combination of good looks and influential parents, Ryan is constantly watched by the media.

After going to college for three years on earth and witnessing a horrifying terrorist attack related to the war between Earthhub and the striviiric-na in deep space, Ryan develops post traumatic stress disorder, drops out of school and returns to Austro, where he quickly begins doing drugs.

However, when Captain Azarcon destroys the pirate ship Genghis Khan and begins to make peace with the striviiric-na, Ryan finds himself in danger. After a failed assassination attempt in a club on New Years Day which leaves many people dead or injured, Ryan finds himself trapped in his home for his own safety- at which point his father comes for him, taking him aboard his ship.

Ryan is immediately caught in the middle of the war, the peace, and the effects thereof. The truth about his father's mysterious past, as a protégé of the pirate captain of the Genghis Khan, Vincenzo Falcone emerges.

Earthhub factions, particularly the Family of Humanity, are against the peace. This extremist group eventually has Ryan's mother assassinated. The Macedon returns to Austro for her funeral, where another assassination attempt nearly kills Ryan. Captain Azarcon subjects Austro to martial law illegally to save him, and is forced to flee to the striviiric-na section of space.

Ryan recovers on his father's ship, where he comes to terms, somewhat, with who he is, who his father is, and his place in the war.

== Works cited ==
- —— (2003). Burndive. Cover art by Matt Stawicki (mass market paperback 1st ed.). Warner Aspect. pp. 1–417. ISBN 9780446613187.

=== Foreign languages ===
- French: Burndive (November 2011), Le Bélial', ISBN 978-2-84344-107-3
