= Lisa Mason (writer) =

American novelist

Lisa Mason was an American writer of science fiction, fantasy, and urban fantasy.

== Life ==
Mason lived in Piedmont, California with her husband, the artist and jeweler Tom Robinson. She was a Phi Beta Kappa scholar and graduate of the University of Michigan, the College of Literature, Sciences, and the Arts, and the University of Michigan Law School. She practiced law in Washington, D.C., and San Francisco.

She transitioned to Matthew Bender and Company, as a legal writer and rose to an executive editor. Many of her novels take place in the vicinity of San Francisco, California, either in the future or in the past through time travel. Her early works are recognized as cyberpunk. She has also written paranormal romance, historical romantic suspense, comedy, and a screenplay.

== Death ==
Mason died peacefully in her sleep on September 13, 2023. In July 2018, she suffered an assault from a stranger while walking around Lake Merritt. She loved her daily walks around the lake, but after this incident, she never fully regained strength in her hips and legs and felt pain on a daily basis. During the last month of her life, she was falling and suffering from mini strokes. Her cause of death was cardiovascular disease.

== Works ==
=== Novels ===
- Arachne (William Morrow/Avon/Eos, 1990)
- Summer of Love (Bantam, 1994)
- Cyberweb (William Morrow/Avon/Eos, 1995)
- The Golden Nineties (Bantam, 1995)
- Pangaea I: Imperium without End (Bantam, 1999)
- Pangaea II: Imperium Aflame (Bantam, 2000)
- Summer of Love, A Time Travel (2010) Bast Books ebook
- Summer of Love (2017) Bast Books ebook and print book
- The Gilded Age, A Time Travel (2011) Bast Books ebook and print book
- The Garden of Abracadabra (2012) Bast Books ebook and print book
- Eon's Kiss (as Suzanna Moore) (2012) Bast Books ebook
- Strange Ladies: 7 Stories (2013) Bast Books ebook and print book (Collection of previously published work including "The Oniomancer," "Guardian," "Felicitas," "Stripper," "Triad," "Destination," and "Transformation and the Postmodern Identity Crisis.")
- Celestial Girl Omnibus Edition (A Lily Modjeska Mystery) (2013) Bast Books ebook
- Shaken (2013) Bast Books ebook (Expansion of Deus Ex Machina published in Asimov's Science Fiction Magazine)
- My Charlotte: Patty's Story (2014) Bast Books ebook
- Tesla, A Worthy of His Time (A Screenplay) (2014) Bast Books ebook
- One Day in the Life of Alexa (2017) Bast Books ebook and print book
- CHROME (2019) Bast Books ebook and print book
- Arachne (2017) Bast Books ebook and print book
- Cyberweb (2017) Bast Books ebook and print book
- ODDITIES: 22 Stories (2020) Bast Books ebook and print book

=== Short fiction ===
- Arachne (Omni, 1987, Hayakawa, 1988, Replik, 1989)
- Future Law (1987)
- Deus Ex Machina (Asimov's Science Fiction Magazine, 1988, Transcendental Tales from Asimov, 1989))
- Guardian (Asimov's Science Fiction Magazine, 1988)
- The Onionmancer (Asimov's Science Fiction Magazine, 1989)
- Tomorrow's Child (Omni Magazine, 1989) Sold outright to Universal Studios, now in development.
- Hummers (Asimov's Science Fiction Magazine, 1991)
- Stripper (Unique Magazine, 1991)
- Destination (Magazine of Fantasy and Science Fiction, 1992)
- Triad (Universe 2, Bantam, 1994)
- Daughter of the Tao (Immortal Unicorn, HarperPrism, 1995)
- Every Mystery Unexplained (Tales of the Impossible, HarperPrism, 1995)
- Felicitas (Desire Burn: Women Writing From the Dark Side of Passion, Carrol & Graf, 1995)
- Transformation and the Postmodern Identity Crisis (Fantastic Alice, Ace, 1995)
- The Sixty-Third Anniversary of Hysteria (Full Spectrum 5, Bantam, 1995)
- The Hanged Man (The Shimmering Door, HarperPrism, 1996)
- U F uh-O, A Sci Fi Comedy (2011) Bast Books ebook
- Tomorrow's Child (2012) Includes Mason's thirty-day blog, The Story Behind the Story That Sold to the Movies Bast Books ebook
- Daughter of the Tao (2012) Bast Books ebook
- Every Mystery Unexplained (2012) Bast Books ebook
- Shaken (2012) Bast Books ebook
- Hummers (2013) Bast Books ebook
- The Sixty-third Anniversary of Hysteria (2013) Bast Books ebook
- Strange Ladies: 7 Stories (2013) Bast Books ebook (Collection of previously published work including "The Oniomancer," "Guardian," "Felicitas," "Stripper," "Triad," "Destination," and "Transformation and the Postmodern Identity Crisis.")
- My Charlotte: Patty's Story (includes Arachne) (2014) Bast Books ebook
- Teardrop (Magazine of Fantasy and Science Fiction, May/June 2015)
- Tomorrow Is A Lovely Day (Magazine of Fantasy and Science Fiction, November/December 2015)
- Anything For You (Magazine of Fantasy and Science Fiction, September/October 2016)
- Riddle (Magazine of Fantasy and Science Fiction, September/October 2017)
- Aurelia (Magazine of Fantasy and Science Fiction, January–February 2018)
- Dangerous WELCOME TO DYSTOPIA: Forty-five Visions of What Lies Ahead (O/R Books) (January 2018)
- The Bicycle Whisperer (Magazine of Fantasy and Science Fiction, May–June 2018)
- Taiga (Not One of Us Digest # 61, April 2019)
- Bess (Daily Science Fiction May 2019)
- Crazy Chimera Lady (Patreon.com/lisamasonfantasyandsciencefictionwriter Tier 2, August 2019)

=== Essays and articles ===
- Journey of the Heart (1991)
- Read This (The New York review of Science Fiction, 1994
- Lisa Mason: Politics and Ecstasy (Interview Locus, The Newspaper of the Science Fiction Field Issue # 400)
- Image of the Spider (Interview Starlog September, 1992)

== Awards ==
- Philip K. Dick Award – Best Novel nominee 1994 : Summer of Love
- The Year's Best Fantasy and Horror, 5th Annual Collection (St. Martin's Press) Hummers
