= The Color of Distance =

1995 novel by Amy Thomson

- Author: Amy Thomson
- Genre: Science fiction
- Publisher: Ace Books
- Publication date: November 1, 1995
- Followed by: Through Alien Eyes (1999)

The Color of Distance is a science fiction novel by American writer Amy Thomson, published in 1995 by Ace Books. It was nominated for a Philip K. Dick Award in the category Best Paperback Original Novel. The sequel is Through Alien Eyes.

== Plot ==
The Color of Distance is a first-contact novel, detailing an encounter between human and alien cultures. The plot alternates between two points of view, that of Dr. Juna Saari, a xenobiologist member of a human Survey crew who unintentionally strand her on the planet of the Tendu, intelligent amphibians with exquisite physiological control, and Anito, a Tendu who helps with Juna's adaptation and ensures her survival. In order to rescue Juna, the Tendu extensively modify her biology, adapting her to the otherwise toxic atmosphere and allowing her to live among them. The Tendu live in the treetops of a tropical zone on their planet, and communicate by changing the color and pattern of their skins. Over the course of the three years Juna spends among the Tendu, she learns their "skin speech" language, masters much of their culture, learns something of the complex alien ecology that surrounds and sustains her, adopts Moki, a young Tendu, and comes to see herself as one of them.

Even as Juna slowly adapts to Tendu life, the Tendu grapple with what this forerunner of further human contact will mean for them and their way of life. The Tendu elder Anito, initially tasked with Juna's survival and resenting her deeply, eventually comes to assume full responsibility for Juna as her atwa, a Tendu word signifying a domain of specialized knowledge and expertise. Together with Juna and other Tendu enkar or elders, particularly Ukatonen, Anito travels to the touchdown site of the human Survey mission, and must work with Juna and other Tendu to repair the environmental damage the human presence has caused.

When Juna is rescued at last by a returning Survey mission, re-entry into human society proves as difficult for her as adapting to Tendu ways. She is forced to undergo quarantine until the humans determine whether she is any threat to their mission—if she has "gone native." In the process, extensive trade negotiations take place between human and Tendu. When the Tendu, with the extensive inner physiological control, prove able not only to heal the human team member Dr. Wu after a heart-attack, but clear out the cholesterol from his arteries and restore him to something approaching youth, the former suspicion and distrust between species begins to dissolve.

Ultimately, Moki and Ukatonen opt to return with Juna and the rest of the Survey team to Earth, setting up the plot for the sequel. The book elaborates the biology of the planet and the life cycle of the aliens and contains environmentalist themes.
