= Ryan Boudinot =

Seattle writer

- Born: November 6, 1972 (age 53); Saint Croix, United States Virgin Islands
- Education: Evergreen State College (BA); Bennington College (MFA)

Ryan Boudinot (born November 6, 1972, in Saint Croix, United States Virgin Islands) is an American writer. He attended Evergreen State College (B.A) and Bennington College (M.FA). He is the author of several books, including The Octopus Rises, Blueprints of the Afterlife, The Littlest Hitler: Stories, and Misconception. The latter three have been nominated for the Washington State Book Award. Blueprints of the Afterlife was also nominated for the Philip K. Dick Award and has been published in translation in the Czech Republic and Spain. He edited Seattle, City of Literature, an anthology featuring essays by over thirty writers.

Boudinot was an MFA advisor at Goddard College from 2007-2015. Following his departure from the position, he wrote an article on his experience, which received widespread criticism for being overly harsh.

Boudinot worked for Amazon as a customer service representative from 1998–2000, during a period when the company expanded from solely selling books to other product categories. He was part of a team that launched what became the company's marketplace platform. He returned to Amazon from 2004-2007 as an editor on the DVD team, merchandising releases for movie studios including 20th Century Fox and the Criterion Collection. His technology career has also included editorial positions at Netflix, Microsoft, Expedia, and Immersion Networks.

In 2013, Boudinot founded Seattle City of Literature a nonprofit organization that managed Seattle's bid to join the UNESCO Creative Cities network. He acted as its Executive Director, but his article on MFAs led to his removal from the position. Seattle was named a UNESCO City of Literature in 2017.
