= Sarah Tolmie =

Sarah Tolmie is a Canadian writer of speculative fiction and poetry. She is based in Waterloo, Ontario, where she is a professor of English at the University of Waterloo.

== Works ==
=== Fiction ===
- The Stone Boatmen - 2014
- NoFood - 2014
- Two Travelers - 2016
- The Little Animals - 2019
- The Fourth Island - 2020
- Disease - 2020
- All the Horses of Iceland - 2022
- Sacraments for the Unfit - 2023

=== Poetry ===
- Sonnet in a Blue Dress - 2014
- Trio - 2015
- The Art of Dying - 2018
- Check - 2020

== Awards ==
| Award | Date of ceremony | Category | Work | Result | Ref. |
|---|---|---|---|---|---|
| Aurora Awards | 2019 | Best Poem/Song | "Ursula Le Guin in the Underworld" | Won | |
| Crawford Award | 2015 | | The Stone Boatmen | Nominated | |
| Griffin Poetry Prize | 2019 | Canadian | The Art of Dying | Nominated | |
| League of Canadian Poets | 2016 | Pat Lowther Award | Trio | Nominated | |
| Philip K. Dick Award | 2020 | | The Little Animals | Honored | |
| Rhysling Award | 2019 | Long Poem | "Ursula Le Guin in the Underworld" | Won | |
