= Richard Paul Russo =

American science fiction writer (born 1954)

- Born: 1954 (age 71–72)
- Education: Clarion Workshop
- Occupation: Writer
- Spouse: Candace
- Writing career
- Genre: Science fiction
- Notable awards: Philip K. Dick Award (1989)

Richard Paul Russo (born 1954) is an American science fiction writer.

He attended the Clarion Workshop in 1983; his first story, "Firebird Suite", appeared in Amazing Stories in 1981 and his first novel, Inner Eclipse, was published in 1988. His second novel, Subterranean Gallery, won the Philip K. Dick Award for 1989. He won that award again in 2001 for Ship of Fools. Subterranean Gallery was also a finalist for the Arthur C. Clarke Award.

As of 2010 he lives in Seattle, Washington with his wife Candace, four cats and two dogs.

== Bibliography ==
=== Novels ===
- Inner Eclipse (1988)
- Subterranean Gallery (1989)
- Ship of Fools (2001)
- The Rosetta Codex (2005)

==== Carlucci series ====
1. Destroying Angel (1992)
2. Carlucci's Edge (1995)
3. Carlucci's Heart (1997)
- Carlucci - omnibus collection (2003)

=== Short story collection ===
- Terminal Visions (2000)

=== Online stories ===
- The Dread and Fear of Kings
