= David Walton (science fiction writer) =

American novelist

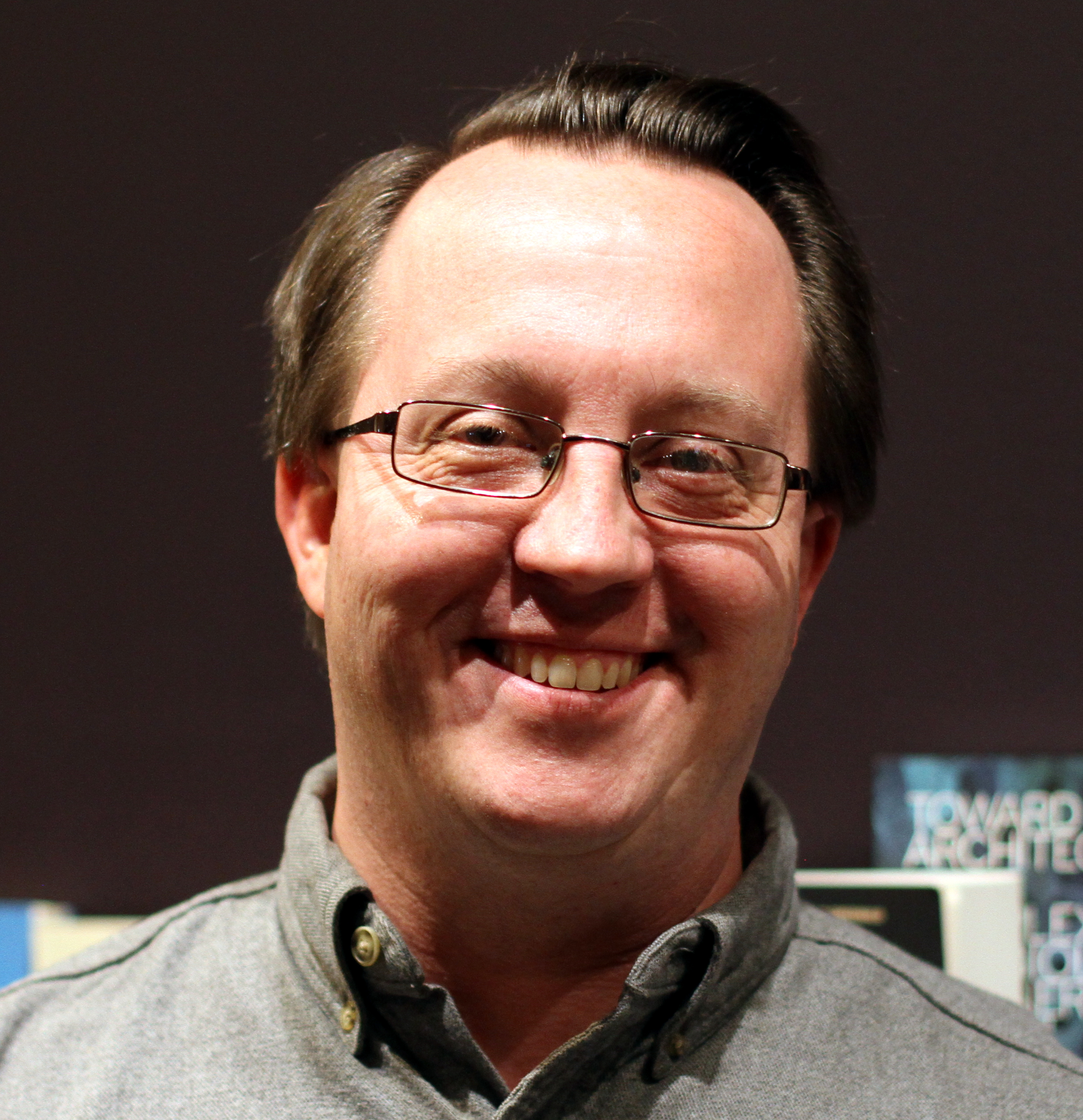
- Born: October 26, 1975 (age 50); U.S.
- Occupation: Novelist
- Writing career
- Genre: Science fiction
- Notable works: Terminal Mind, The Genius Plague
- Website: www.davidwaltonfiction.com

David Walton (born October 26, 1975) is an American science fiction and fantasy writer living in Philadelphia. His novel Terminal Mind won the 2008 Philip K. Dick Award for the best paperback science fiction novel published in the United States, in a tie with Adam-Troy Castro's novel Emissaries from the Dead.

== Career ==
After years of short story writing, Walton published his award-winning novel Terminal Mind in 2008, followed by Quintessence and its sequel Quintessence Sky in 2013 and Superposition and its sequel Supersymmetry in 2015. The rights to a TV adaptation of the Superposition series was sold in late 2015.

== Awards ==
- 2018 John W. Campbell Memorial Award for Best Science Fiction Novel - for "The Genius Plague"
- 2009 Philip K. Dick Award (tie) - for best original paperback of the year "Terminal Mind"
- 2008 Jim Baen Memorial Award - for short story "Letting Go"

== Bibliography ==
=== Novels ===
- Terminal Mind. Meadowhawk Press. April 2008. ISBN 978-0-9787326-3-9.
- Quintessence. Tor Books. March 2013. ISBN 9780765330901.
- Quintessence sky. David Walton. 2013. ISBN 9781492938477.
- Superposition. Pyr. 7 April 2015. ISBN 9781633880122.
- Supersymmetry. Pyr. 1 September 2015. ISBN 9781633880986.
- The Genius Plague. Pyr. 3 October 2017. ISBN 9781633883437.
- Three Laws Lethal. Pyr. 11 June 2019. ISBN 9781633885608.
- Living Memory. Archaeopteryx Books. 18 October 2022. ISBN 9781088035375.
- Deadly Memory. Archaeopteryx Books. 2 May 2023. ISBN 9781087923369.
- Memory Reborn. Archaeopteryx Books. 28 November 2023. ISBN 9798868909283.

=== Short fiction ===
Stories

Title	Year	First published	Reprinted/collected	Notes
Fly like the light	2001	Walton, David (May 2001). "Fly like the light". Rogue Worlds.		

- "Anyone Can Whistle", Electric Wine, 2001
- "All About Eventualities", Neverworlds, 2002
- "Hands", Aoife's Kiss, 2004
- "All The Rage This Year", All The Rage This Year, Phobos Books, 2004
- "No Forwarding Address", Anotherealm, 2005
- "The Problem of Friction", Lenox Avenue, 2005
- "Diamond Dust", Futurismic, 2005
- "Anyone Can Whistle", Escape Pod, 2006
- "Rival of Mars", Analog Science Fiction and Fact, 2006
- "The Towers of St. Michael's", Futurismic, 2007
- "When Peace and Redemption Collide", Continuum SF, 2007
- "Raven Crumbling", Fantastical Visions anthology, 2007
- "Mattie's Cougar", Touched by Wonder anthology, Meadowhawk Press, 2007
- "Permission to Speak Freely", Analog Science Fiction and Fact, 2007
- "Rings of Jupiter", Talebones, 2008
- "Letting Go", Jim Baen's Universe, Cosmos, 2008
- "Dragonfly Savior", Fantastical Visions anthology, 2009

=== Critical studies and reviews of Walton's work ===
Superposition

- Sakers, Don (June 2015). "The Reference Library". Analog Science Fiction and Fact. 135 (6): 105–108.
