= The Time-servers =

1985 novel by Russell M. Griffin

First edition

The Time-servers is a novel by Russell M. Griffin, published in 1985 by Avon Books. The tagline on the cover of the paperback is, "Too far from Earth time creates a different kind of human." It received a nomination for the Philip K. Dick Award for excellence in science fiction in 1985. This novel is no longer in print.
