= Summer of Love (novel) =

1994 novel by Lisa Mason

- Author: Lisa Mason
- Illustrator: Tom Robinson
- Language: English
- Genre: Science fiction
- Set in: San Francisco (1967)
- Publisher: Bantam Books
- Publication date: 1994
- Publication place: United States
- Media type: Print
- Pages: 384
- ISBN: 0553373307
- OCLC: 29954671
- Dewey Decimal: 813.54
- LC Class: PS3563.A7924

Summer of Love is a novel by Lisa Mason. It is about a time traveler from the year 2467, who goes back in time to the 1967 Summer of Love.

== Reception ==
Summer of Love was a finalist for the 1994 Philip K. Dick Award.

Publishers Weekly described it as "psychedelic" and "quirky", and lauded Mason's "extrapolations (of) future social and environmental conditions" as "intriguing and plausible", but faulted it for having a "(r)ecycled premise and two-dimensional characters". Entertainment Weekly called it "The Terminator in love beads".

In 2013, David G. Hartwell included it on the New York Review of Science Fiction's list of "200 Significant Science Fiction Books by Women, 1984–2001".
