= The Littlest Hitler =

- First edition
- Author: Ryan Boudinot
- Language: English
- Publisher: Counterpoint
- Publication date: September 4, 2006
- Publication place: United States
- Pages: 224
- ISBN: 1-58243-357-7
- OCLC: 64289285
- Dewey Decimal: 813/.6 22
- LC Class: PS3602.O888 L57 2006

The Littlest Hitler is a 2006 collection of short stories by Ryan Boudinot.

== Plot ==
The book has characters who have occupations such as drugstore workers and pharmacists. The short stories have things such as a cannibalistic mother, serial killers, zombies and terrorists. The last story is called "The Newholy" which has to do with immigration.

== Reception ==
A Publishers Weekly review says, "Reminiscent of early Rick Moody or the short stories of Daniel Handler, each of Boudinot's 13 stories is a microcosm of weirdness imbued with imagination and maniacal wit". A Kirkus Reviews review says "When Boudinot writes shtick, he's tiresome. When he writes fully developed stories, he's abrasive, thought-provoking and explosively funny". The book was Publishers Weekly's book of the year.
