= Storyteller (novel) =

2003 novel by Amy Thomson

- First edition
- Author: Amy Thomson
- Language: English
- Publisher: Ace Books
- Publication date: 2003
- Dewey Decimal: 813.54
- LC Class: PS3570.H64648 S76

Storyteller is a book by Amy Thomson published in 2003 by Ace Books. The book follows the story of an orphan who is adopted by a storyteller, a member of the Storytelling Guild who travels the stars in a historian like capacity. In contrast to her earlier books which were very hard science fiction Storyteller was much more romantic, the novel focuses on themes such as longevity and environmentalism ignoring technological focus. One reviewer wrote "Some readers will find this book immensely touching. However, readers who prefer a harder edge are liable be put off by sentimentality, weak conflict and a too-readily resolved plot that smacks of wish fulfillment".
