= Liberation (Slattery novel) =

2008 science fiction novel by Brian Francis Slattery

- Author: Brian Francis Slattery
- Genre: Science fiction
- Publisher: Tor Books
- Publication date: 2008
- ISBN: 978-0-7653-2046-9

Liberation: Being the Adventures of the Slick Six After the Collapse of the United States of America is a 2008 science fiction novel by American writer Brian Francis Slattery about a post-economic collapse America, where a combination of capitalist and criminal forces reshape the United States into a grouping of Balkanized microgovernments and lawless slave plantations.

== Summary ==
A group of supercriminals known as the "Slick Six," led by an assassin named Marco Oliveira, regroup to steal America back from a New York kingpin named "The Aardvark." The Aardvark has usurped power in the wake of disaster and borrowed an immense amount of money from Japan in order to re-institute slavery and run his criminal empire from a makeshift tower of slag in Manhattan.
