= Brian Francis Slattery =

American writer and editor

- Occupations: Novelist, journalist
- Writing career
- Genre: Fiction
- Website: www.bfslattery.com

Brian Francis Slattery is an American writer and an editor at the New Haven Review. He has published four novels, Spaceman Blues (Tor, 2007), Liberation (Tor, 2008), Lost Everything (Tor, 2012), and The Family Hightower (Seven Stories Press, 2014).

Spaceman Blues was nominated for best novel by both the Lambda Literary Awards and the Gaylactic Spectrum Awards . The editors of Amazon.com named Liberation the best science fiction/fantasy book of 2008, saying it "combined the serious and the satirical in creating an unforgettable image of a future America beset by the collapse of the dollar and the specter of a new form of slavery."

Lost Everything won the Philip K. Dick Award in 2012.

Slattery plays and teaches the fiddle and the banjo, and he lives outside New Haven, Connecticut with his family.

== Bibliography ==
=== Novels ===
- Spaceman Blues: A Love Song (2007)
- Liberation: Being the Adventures of the Slick Six After the Collapse of the United States of America (2008)
- Lost Everything (2012)
- The Family Hightower (2014)

=== Serial fiction ===
- Bookburners (created by Max Gladstone)
  - Bookburners Season One (with Gladstone, Margaret Dunlap, and Mur Lafferty)
    - Episode 2: "Anywhere But Here" (2015)
    - Episode 6: "Big Sky" (2015)
    - Episode 12: "Puppets" (2015)
    - Episode 14: "An Excellent Day for an Exorcism" (2015)

=== Short fiction ===
- "The Death and Life of Elodia Harwinton", The Revelator, (2014)
- "The Syndrome", Subterranean, (2013)
- "The Ashland Waltz", The Revelator, (2012)
- "The Spleen Brothers", The Revelator, (2011)
- "The Big Deal", The Dirty Pond, (2009)
- "Interviews After the Revolution", Interfictions 2, (2009)
- "The World Is a Voice in My Neighbor's Throat", Brain Harvest, (2009)
- "A Push-Reel Mower's Rumination on Mowing the Lawn in the Gas-Powered Age", McSweeney's Internet Tendency, (2006)
- "The Things that Get You", Glimmer Train, (2002)

== Awards and honors ==
- 2012 Philip K. Dick Award, Lost Everything
