= Karin Lowachee =

Guyanese-born Canadian author of speculative fiction

- Citizenship: Canada
- Occupation: Novelist
- Writing career
- Language: English
- Genres: Science fiction and fantasy
- Notable works: Warchild; Burndive; Cagebird
- Website: karinlowachee.com

Karin Lowachee is a Canadian author of speculative fiction. She is best known for her Warchild series, including Warchild (2002), Burndive (2003), and Cagebird (2005).

== Awards and honours ==
In 2016, Locus included "A Good Home" on their list of recommended reading for the year.

Year	Title	Award	Category	Result	Ref.
2001	Warchild	Warner Aspect First Novel Contest	Debut Novel	Won	
2002	Warchild	Aurora Award	Long-Form Work in English	Finalist	
2002	Warchild	Philip K. Dick Award	—	Finalist	
2003	Burndive	Aurora Award	Long-Form Work in English	Finalist	
2004	"The Forgotten Ones"	Aurora Award	Short-Form Work in English	Finalist	
2005	Cagebird	Aurora Award	Long-Form Work in English	Won	
2005	Cagebird	Philip K. Dick Award	—	Finalist	
2006	Cagebird	Gaylactic Spectrum Awards	Novel	Won	
2006	"This Ink Feels Like Sorrow"	Aurora Award	Short-Form Work in English	Finalist	
2018	"Meridian”	Sunburst Award	Short Story	Finalist	
2022	"Nomad”	Seiun Award	Translated Short Story	Finalist	
2023	"A Sun Will Always Sing”	Canopus Award	Published Short-Form Fiction	Finalist	

== Selected publications ==
=== Novels ===
- —— (2010). The Gaslight Dogs. ISBN 9780451463142.

=== Warchild series ===
- —— (2002). Warchild. Grand Central. ISBN 9780446610773.
- —— (2003). Burndive. Grand Central. ISBN 9780446613187.
- —— (2005). Cagebird. ISBN 9780446615082.
- —— (2020). Omake: Stories from the Warchild Universe (ebook ed.). ASIN B08M12QRVY.
- —— (2023). Under the Silence: A Warchild Mosaic Novella (Kindle ed.). ASIN B0CQBDSL7M.

=== Short stories ===
- "Culture Shock", On Spec: The Canadian Magazine of Speculative Writing (1994)
- "The Forgotten Ones", So Long Been Dreaming: Postcolonial Science Fiction & Fantasy (2004), edited by Uppinder Mehan & Nalo Hopkinson
- "This Ink Feels Like Sorrow", Mythspring: From the Lyrics & Legends of Canada (2006), edited by Genevieve Kierans & Julie E. Czerneda
- "Nomad", Armored (2012), edited by John Joseph Adams
- "The Bleach", When the Villain Comes Home (2012), edited by Gabrielle Harbowy & Ed Greenwood
- "Enemy States", War Stories: New Military Science Fiction (2014), edited by Jaym Gates and Andrew Liptak

== See also ==
- List of Canadian writers
