= Through Alien Eyes =

1999 novel by Amy Thomson

- Author: Amy Thomson
- Language: English
- Publisher: Ace Books
- Publication date: 1999

Through Alien Eyes is a science fiction novel by Amy Thomson published in 1999 by Ace Books, the sequel to The Color of Distance. The story follows two aliens who return to Earth with the human protagonist from The Color of Distance.
