= City of Islands =

2018 book by Kali Wallace

- Author: Kali Wallace
- Genre: Children's fantasy, Middle grade fiction
- Publisher: HarperCollins
- Publication date: July 24, 2018
- Pages: 336
- ISBN: 978-0-06-249981-3

City of Islands is a 2018 children's fantasy novel by Kali Wallace.

== Background ==
The novel was Wallace's first children's book, and she chose to set it in a multicultural seaport with characters of different ethnicities, orientations and economic statuses so that children of all backgrounds could relate to it. Wallace also considered the way that the novel's fictional society treated children to be a core theme, as the protagonist Mara must work and struggle to survive despite being a child. She described it as "the kind of children’s story that illuminates the ways in which adults fail children."

== Synopsis ==
Twelve year-old Mara is an orphan from Quarantine Island, in the City of Islands, who was adopted by a bone witch as a young girl. After the disappearance of her adoptive guardian, she begins working as a diver for the Lady of the Tides, gathering magical artifacts from the sea floor. After discovering the submerged bones of strange chimeras, Mara discovers a sinister plot which threatens the existence of the City of Islands.

== Reception ==
Publishers Weekly wrote that the novel's world "offers dreamlike imagery, a fresh concept, and a haunting atmosphere." Kate Quealy-Gainer, in The Bulletin of the Center for Children's Books, wrote that "Wallace deftly balances world building with a twisting, surprising plot; the particulars of the specific types of magic and the backstories that supposedly led to them are especially intriguing." Kirkus Reviews also praised the novel's worldbuilding and themes.
