= Theory of Bastards =

2018 book by Audrey Schulman

- Author: Audrey Schulman
- Language: English
- Genre: Science fiction
- Publisher: Europa Editions
- Publication date: April 24, 2018
- ISBN: 978-1-60945-437-1

Theory of Bastards is a 2018 science fiction novel by Audrey Schulman.

== Synopsis ==
In the near future, mankind has grown increasingly reliant on technology and climate change threatens the interconnectivity of modern life. Biologist Francine Burk develops a theory that human women cheat on their partners because the offspring of extramarital affairs have evolutionary advantages. This theory brings her considerable prestige and she is able to test this theory while studying bonobos at a prestigious research facility in the American Midwest. After a dust storm causes a power outage, Burk and her partner must work together to protect themselves and their research subjects. They eventually are forced to leave the institute with their bonobos as they struggle to survive.

== Reception ==
The book received mostly positive reviews for its tone, prose and pacing. Reviewers also noted its social commentary and use of evolutionary psychology. Ian Mond, writing for Locus, praised Schulman's handling of topics related to chronic pain, intimacy and the dangers of overreliance on technology. Kirkus Reviews described it as "a deeply unusual, psychologically astute novel about technology and survival, sex and love."

However, some reviewers found the protagonist to be unlikable, and the overall plot was also criticized. In particular, the novel's second act was criticized for departing from the tone and style of the first half. Sean Guynes-Vishniac of World Literature Today considered the novel's science fiction elements to be derivative, and described the protagonist's theory as "bullshit science that universalizes the experience of a subset of (American) women to the entire species and cuts across cultural and historical differences."

It received the 2019 Philip K. Dick Award, and a Neukom Institute Literary Arts Award.
