= Road Out of Winter =

Novel by Alison Stine

- Author: Alison Stine
- Language: English
- Genre: Science fiction, post-apocalyptic fiction
- Publisher: HarperCollins
- Publication date: September 1, 2020
- Publication place: United States
- Pages: 315
- ISBN: 978-0778309925

Road Out of Winter is a 2020 science fiction and post-apocalyptic novel by Alison Stine.

== Synopsis ==
After an unusually long winter has led to gradual societal collapse, a young woman named Wil supports herself by selling marijuana but finds this skill more difficult due to climate change. She eventually decides to leave her home in Appalachian Ohio and go to California. Her journey through the post-apocalyptic United States is made dangerous by the environmental damage and social decay which has occurred.

== Themes ==
The protagonist Wil is placed at odds with the dominant forces in the novel, as a bisexual woman in a patriarchal society, as an herbalist in a wintry landscape. Jonah Raskin of the New York Journal of Books described her as "a kind of redneck Wonder Woman".

Wil contends with various forms of patriarchy and oppressive masculinity, which is exemplified by her boyfriend Lobo, a patriarchal cult called The Church, and the violent gangs that inhabit the post apocalyptic country. Violent masculinity is equated with the primal, natural world in the novel. Nature as an antagonistic force is another theme of the novel, with Maria Warren of Nerd Daily writing that "the landscape becomes a villain on its own" in the novel.

== Reception ==
The book received mostly positive reviews from critics, earning praise for its tense atmosphere and prose.

D. Harlan Wilson in the Los Angeles Review of Books praised its portrayal of a dystopic Ohio that was rooted in the present day culture of Appalachia. Mira Harlequin of Library Journal wrote that it included elements of a rural thriller. It was included on the Los Angeles Times list of eight books about the American working class to read instead of Hillbilly Elegy.

It won the 2021 Philip K. Dick Award.
