= Emily Devenport =

American science fiction writer

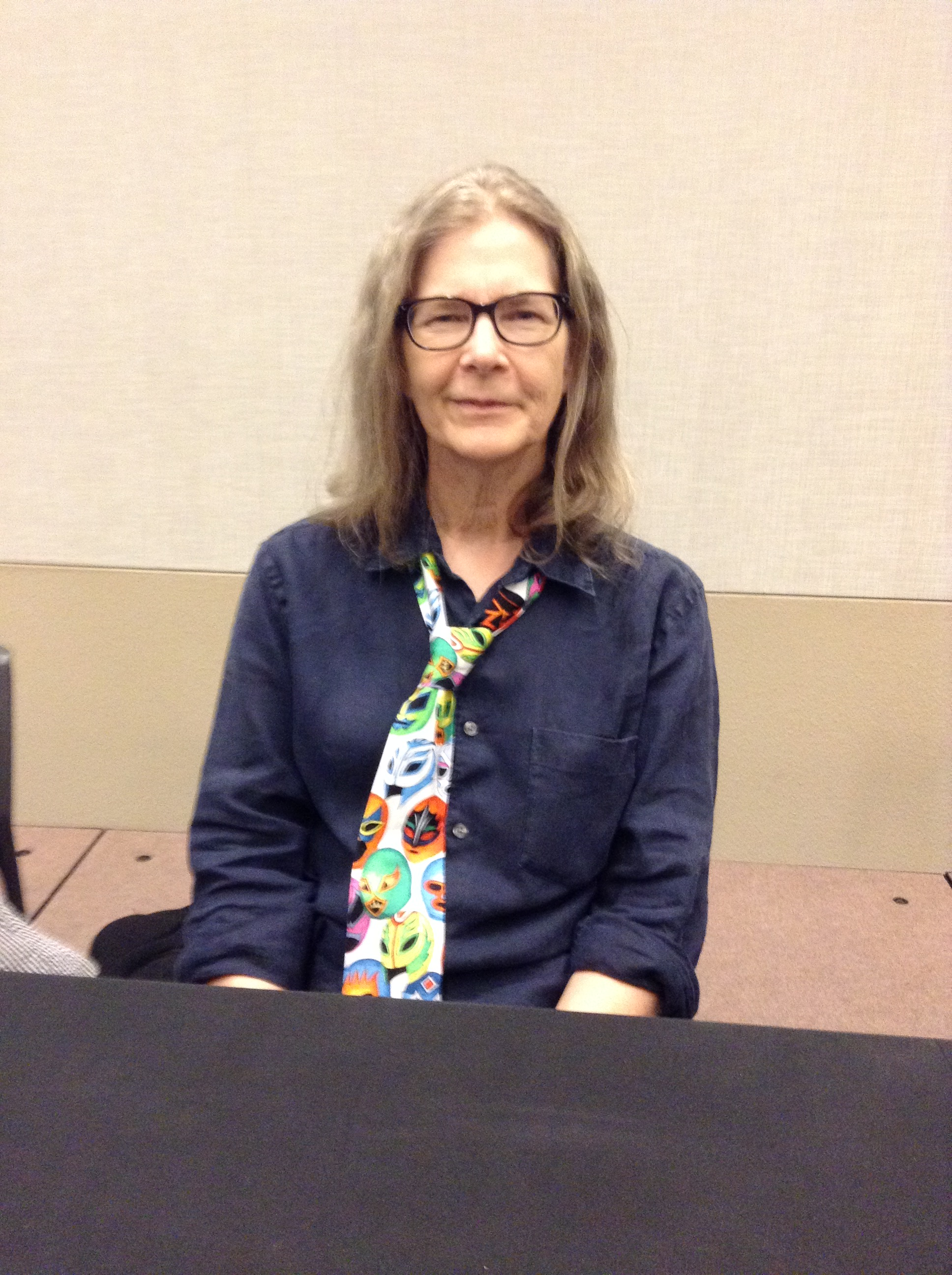
- Devenport at the 2018 Phoenix Comic Fest
- Occupation: Writer
- Writing career
- Pen name: Maggy Thomas; Lee Hogan
- Genre: Science fiction
- Website: www.emsjoiedeweird.com

Emily Devenport is an American science fiction writer. She has written seven novels under her name, one novel under the pseudonym Maggy Thomas, and two novels as Lee Hogan.

Devenport was a finalist for the Philip K. Dick Award for best novel for Broken Time (2000).

She also works as a volunteer at the Desert Botanical Garden in Phoenix.

== Novels ==
=== Written as Emily Devenport ===
- Shade (1991)
- Larissa (1993)
- Scorpianne (1994)
- Eggheads (1996)
- The Kronos Condition (1997)
- Godheads (1998)
- The Medusa Cycle
  - Medusa Uploaded (2018): Oichi Angelis navigates danger and treachery on a generation starship.
  - Medusa in the Graveyard (2019)

=== Written as Maggy Thomas ===
- Broken Time (2000): Siggy Lindquist's job at the Institute for the Criminally Insane is complicated by the attention of two inmates, a pair of the galaxy's deadliest criminals.

=== Written as Lee Hogan ===
- Belarus (2002): Humans colonize a planet they believe is uninhabited, but soon realize that a brutal alien race lives below the surface.
- Enemies (2003): Belarus is a shadow of its former self when the new galactic Union comes calling.

== Short stories ==
- "Shade and the Elephant Man" (1987)
- "Skin Deep" (1987)
- "Cat Scratch" (1988)
- "Loop" (1988)
- "Goddoggit" (1995)
- "The Long Ride" (1997)
- "If the Sun's at Five O'Clock, It Must Be Yellow Daisies" (2010)
- "Dr. Polingyouma's Machine" (2015)
- "Postcards from Monster Island" (2015)
- "Now Is the Hour" (2016)
- "Queen of the Cats" (2017)
- "Cruddy" (2018)
- "The Hitter" (2019)
