= Saraband of Lost Time =

1985 novel by Richard Grant

- First edition cover
- Author: Richard Grant
- Language: English
- Genre: Science fiction
- Publisher: Avon Books
- Publication date: March 1985
- Publication place: United States
- Media type: Print (paperback)
- Pages: 327 (first edition, paperback)
- ISBN: 0-380-89533-1 (first edition, paperback)
- OCLC: 11921837

Saraband of Lost Time is a science fiction novel by American writer Richard Grant, published by Avon Books in 1985. It is his first novel. Saraband of Lost Time placed eighth in the annual Locus magazine poll for best first novel, and received a special citation from the Philip K. Dick Award judges.

== Plot summary ==
The story takes place in thirty-five chapters. The characters come from various locations, and travel across the land in their adventures. Grant created his place names, drinks, songs and more for this novel. Unlike many fantasy novels, he did not create a map of the world, which is supposedly a futuristic Earth after the occurrence of an apocalypse of some kind. It may or may not be the same world used in Rumors of Spring and Through the Heart. The characters are still human and are not a great deal different from modern humans in most cases. In all three books, humans mostly deal with major environmental changes and the resulting changes in humanity, but some people have stood out as different.

== Reception ==
Algis Budrys found Saraband of Lost Time to be "one of the most engaging first novels in years," praising the novel as "a piece of cultured prose which by its nature confers importance on its cast of characters and on their activities," but faulting Grant's failure to provide an understandable "pattern [for] the rather fragmented events taking place at the story's close."

Dave Langford, reviewing Saraband of Lost Time for White Dwarf #93, compared it to A Storm of Wings, stating that "Critics prefer Storm's literary echoes and clever bits; but for all its excessive length, more readers are likely to finish Saraband."
