= Lost Everything =

2012 novel by Brian Francis Slattery

- Author: Brian Francis Slattery
- Language: English
- Genre: Science fiction
- Pages: 304
- Awards: Philip K. Dick Award
- ISBN: 0765329123

Lost Everything is an apocalyptic science fiction novel by Brian Francis Slattery, published in 2012 by Tor Books. The novel received the 2012 Philip K. Dick Award.

The novel takes place in an apocalyptic America plagued by civil war after fierce storms have decimated major cities.

The novel follows Sunny Jim as he travels up a river with a group of other survivors in search of his wife and son.

== Reception ==
Kirkus Reviews praised the novel's setting and the development of familial relationships, but said that, "the novel is plagued by an unsatisfying, scattershot execution." Publishers Weekly compared the novel's themes to Cormac McCarthy's The Road, but wrote that the novel suffered from pacing problems and was morbid without sufficient relief. Woman's Day reviewer Alexandra Gekas disagreed that the novel lacked relief, writing "The people we meet [in the novel] certainly show intense cruelty, but there are also moments of profound kindness, small, but powerful gestures of love and a great sense of hope overriding hopelessness."

The novel received the 2012 Philip K. Dick Award.
