= Virtual Girl =

1993 novel by Amy Thomson

- Cover of the 1993 Ace Books edition
- Author: Amy Thomson
- Language: English
- Publisher: Ace Books
- Publication date: 1993

Virtual Girl is a science fiction novel by Amy Thomson published in 1993 by Ace Books, about a robot illegally built with artificial intelligence. The author won the John W. Campbell Award for Best New Writer with the book.
