= Kali Wallace =

American speculative fiction writer

Kali Wallace is an American author of speculative fiction for children and adults.

== Early life and education ==
Wallace was born in Colorado Springs, Colorado. She received an undergraduate degree in geology at Brown University before attending University of Colorado Boulder where she graduated with a PhD in geophysics.

== Career ==
Wallace has published a number of short stories in publications such as Tor.com, Clarkesworld Magazine and Asimov's Science Fiction. Wallace's short story "The Day They Came" was published in Lightspeed in 2012. The story is notable for having been written in the second person point of view.

Her debut novel Shallow Graves was published in 2016. The young adult novel focused on a teenage girl's attempts to solve her own murder after mysteriously coming back to life. It received critical praise for its suspense and incorporation of mythological elements. The following year, she published The Memory Trees, another young adult fantasy-suspense novel. The book was placed on The Bulletin of the Center for Children's Books' Blue Ribbon List. Wallace published the children's fantasy book City of Islands in 2018.

In 2019, Wallace published the science fiction-thriller Salvation Day, her first novel for adults. Salvation Day was followed by the adult science fiction-mystery novel Dead Space in 2021, for which she received a Philip K. Dick Award. The following year, she published the children's fantasy book Hunters of the Lost City, which earned a positive reception from critics.

== Works ==
=== Adult fiction ===
- Salvation Day (2019)
- Dead Space (2021)

=== Children's and young adult fiction ===
- Shallow Graves (2016)
- The Memory Trees (2017)
- City of Islands (2018)
- Hunters of the Lost City (2022)
