= Richard Grant (author) =

American novelist

- Born: 1952 (age 73–74)
- Occupation: Author
- Writing career
- Genres: Science fiction; fantasy
- Notable awards: Philip K. Dick Award (1992)

Richard Grant (born 1952) is an American science fiction and fantasy author.

== List of works ==
- Saraband of Lost Time (1985) Special Citation Philip K. Dick Award—Science Fiction
- Rumors of Spring (1986)—Fantasy
- Views from the Oldest House (1989)—Fantasy
- Through the Heart (1991) Winner Philip K. Dick Award—Fantasy
- Tex and Molly in the Afterlife (1996)—Fiction
- In the Land of Winter (1997)—Fiction
- Kaspian Lost (1999)
- Another Green World (2006)
- "Drode's Equations" (1981), a short story that appeared in New Dimensions 12 and is available in the science fiction anthology The Ascent of Wonder: The Evolution of Hard SF, edited by David G. Hartwell and Kathryn Cramer (1994)
