= Strange Toys =

1987 novel by Patricia Geary

- Spectra Special Editions cover.
- Author: Patricia Geary
- Language: English
- Genre: Fantasy
- Publisher: Bantam Spectra
- Publication date: 1987
- Publication place: United States
- Media type: Print (Paperback)
- Pages: 248
- ISBN: 0-553-26872-4
- OCLC: 16075102

Strange Toys is a fantasy novel by American writer Patricia Geary, published in 1987. It won the Philip K. Dick Award that year.

Ursula Le Guin included it (as well as Geary's Living in Ether) in her selections of "Unjustly Neglected Works of Science Fiction" for a 1993 survey carried out by the journal Science Fiction Studies.

== Reviews ==
- See, Carolyn (August 8, 1987). Witchcraft Power Is Power. Los Angeles Times, p. 5
