= M. M. Buckner =

American writer

- Education: Memphis State University; Boston University (MA)
- Occupation: Author
- Spouse: Jack Lyle
- Writing career
- Genre: Hard science fiction
- Notable awards: Philip K. Dick Award (2005)
- Website: www.mmbuckner.com

M. M. Buckner (Mary M. Buckner) is an American science fiction author specializing in hard science fiction, and also an environmental activist. Her third novel, War Surf, won the 2005 Philip K. Dick Award for best novel of the year, and her first novel Hyperthought was nominated in 2003.

Buckner's fourth novel, Watermind, won the Barnes & Noble SF Top Ten ranking for 2009. Her fifth novel, The Gravity Pilot, was released in March, 2011. Buckner's work has been published in five languages: Japanese, Chinese, German, Spanish and English. According to a review in The Magazine of Fantasy & Science Fiction, Buckner is "one of the best writers working in our genre today."

Buckner studied English at Memphis State University and earned an M.A. in Creative Writing from Boston University. She worked as marketing vice president for a financial firm where her work earned two Diamond Addy Awards. Afterward, she devoted herself mainly to writing. Her novels include Hyperthought, Neurolink and War Surf (all published by Ace), as well as Watermind and The Gravity Pilot, (published by Macmillan/Tor). Twice, she has been interviewed on the podcast The Future And You: first in December 2005 concerning global warming and then in May 2006, shortly after winning the Philip K. Dick Award, to describe the experience. She is married to Jack Lyle and currently resides in Nashville, Tennessee.
