= Ship of Fools (Russo novel) =

2001 novel by Richard Paul Russo

Ship of Fools (Unto Leviathan)
- 1st edition cover
- Author: Richard Paul Russo
- Cover artist: Bruce Jensen
- Language: English
- Genre: Science fiction
- Publisher: Ace Books, later Orbit Books under the name Unto Leviathan
- Publication date: January 9, 2001
- Publication place: United States
- Media type: Print (Paperback)
- Pages: 370
- ISBN: 0-441-00798-8
- OCLC: 45772927
- Dewey Decimal: 813/.54 21
- LC Class: PS3568.U8122 S55 2001

Ship of Fools is a science fiction novel by Richard Paul Russo. First published in 2001, it won the Philip K. Dick Award for that year.

The novel has been rereleased by Orbit Books under the name Unto Leviathan.

== Overview ==
The Argonos is a space-faring generation ship containing thousands of humans. The Argonos has presumably been traveling through space for centuries upon centuries. The original goal of the Argonos has been lost over time; no one on board can say for certain of their origins. A class-system has developed in which the commoners and poor serve in the lower levels and provide maintenance for the ship. By contrast, the upper-class maintain positions of power. A Bishop sits as the head of the Church which wields some influence over the people, and the Bishop himself is a member of the Executive Council which governs the Argonos. When a signal is received, a team aboard the Argonos prepare to make a landing on the first alien planet to be encountered in years.

== Plot ==
The story is told by the reserved Bartolomeo Aguilera whose cunning and bravery contribute to the outcome of the novel. Born with physical defects, he has integrated prosthetic material into his body as compensation. Bartolomeo is a close friend and advisor of the Argonos' captain, Nikos.

Within the first few chapters it is clear that Nikos is in an increasingly dangerous situation and that tensions on the ship are beginning to rise. Niko's credibility as captain is declining and many are ready for a new leader. Nikos informs Bartolomeo of news which may help to improve or reduce Nikos' position. While the Bishop's previous failed landing helped to place Nikos in good light, there seems little to improve Nikos' ordeal. A planet suitable for human life has been discovered. It is a short distance away and therefore a landing can be attempted, but more importantly, a signal has been sent from the planet. It is a basic signal offering no information as to who sent it or why. Nikos asks Bartolomeo to join the team which is to land on the planet, which the Bishop names Antioch.

The team consists of representatives of the Executive Council, Bartolomeo included, and of the different classes on the ship. The crew, along with harvesters which are to collect and process materials for the Argonos, descend on the planet. They soon discover that Antioch appears to have been settled by humans at one time, but it has been deserted for a long time—decades, if not centuries. Although the team visits only a handful of the city-complexes, there are presumably numerous cities around the planet. All of them contain enigmatic and crumbling structures.

The first startling discovery the team makes foreshadows the epiphany of evil which looms over the Argonos for the latter part of the book. A number of human remains are found outside several of the city-complexes. The remains are all but decayed with only bones remaining, and the few intact skeletons they find reveal no apparent trauma or instance of a violent death. However, the second discovery haunts the team even after leaving the planet.

The team enters a glass structure which at first reveals nothing about the world or its former inhabitants. In the structure, they uncover a staircase winding down underground to another chamber. At the bottom of the staircase lies a nightmare: in a vast room there are contained, on hooks and in chains, an unimaginable number of mutilated human skeletons, including a number of children and infants. The Argonos is contacted at once and the team decides it is time to leave.

The Argonos prepares to leave orbit, but amongst the underclasses there is talk of settling on Antioch. Par, a friend of Bartolomeo asks him for his help in a planned insurrection; the common people of the ship's blue-collar "lower decks" desire to leave Argonos and live on Antioch in order to escape their lives of unending drudgery on the Argonos. Bartolomeo agrees to help and he obtains access codes for the bay-doors and shuttles. However, the operation is thwarted and fails miserably resulting in several participants, including Bartolomeo, being taken into custody. Bartolomeo soon discovers that Nikos knew about Bartolomeo's involvement and used it to his advantage and reassert himself as captain. Bartolomeo remains in prison for months on end until he is finally released along with all of the other prisoners.

He stands before the Executive Council and defends his reasons for aiding in the operation. Under his advice, other political prisoners are pardoned. Bartolomeo's position as advisor is reinstated and he is updated on a new mystery which Argonos has come across.

Unbeknownst to the planet exploration team, upon their entry into one of the buildings on Antioch, a signal from the building was sent deep into space. The team was never informed of this, but Nikos decided that the Argonos should travel to where the signal had been sent, which ended up being the location of the alien ship. There, this alien starship—a vast, immeasurable, structure far larger than the Argonos—lies dormant in the dead of space, and it appears just as silent and uninhabited as Antioch. Bartolomeo takes head of a team which has been attempting to explore the mysterious ship. There has already been a number of deaths and other unfortunate incidents among previous exploratory team members while exploring the ship. Bartolomeo therefore ensures that extra precautions are taken as he takes control.

Some time after Bartolomeo assumes control of the operations aboard the alien ship, the mystery becomes even greater: a solitary old woman is found in a compartment of the ship which, unlike the rest of the explored sections, inexplicably has Earth-like gravity and air breathable to humans. At first, the old woman is unable to understand the languages used to communicate with her and speaks only in gibberish. She eventually begins to communicate with scientists in English. She says her name is Sarah and claims to have been from Antioch, and says the aliens saved her people, but can clarify nothing else in her delirious state.

Upon Bartolomeo's urging, the Executive Committee decides that rather than continuing to explore the staggeringly huge vessel themselves, they will attach the ship to the Argonos and take it with them in hopes of delivering it to another human settlement with greater resources to continue the ship's exploration. This proves to be a horrible mistake as the true nature of the ship is revealed. Shortly after this decision is made, a young boy known by Bartolomeo sneaks aboard the alien ship, and Bartolomeo uncovers a horrifying part of the puzzle when he goes on board to bring the boy back to the Argonos: behind a door that the exploration team was not able to open on previous visits, Bartolomeo and the boy discover an enormous chamber containing horribly mangled corpses similar to the ones uncovered on Antioch, but in much greater quantity and more well-preserved because they had been frozen. It becomes clear that the aliens who committed the genocidal acts on Antioch were or still are on board the alien vessel, and were most likely its builders. While talking to the distraught boy, Bartolomeo has a sudden realization: How did the old woman know that they had named the planet "Antioch?" She is, as deduced by Bartolomeo, an alien.

Bartolomeo calls an emergency meeting with the Executive Council and tells those taking care of "Sarah" to seal the room and sedate her. Once the "Sarah" realizes something new is happening, her human shape begins to change somewhat and she displays an extreme amount of strength while trying to break out of the medical room. She is eventually sedated and ejected into space, but not before momentarily transforming into something other than human.

Attempts made to separate the alien vessel from the Argonos fail. Weapons have no effect. As panic begins to intensify aboard the ship, a final plan is devised. The residents on the Argonos will be crammed into the harvesters and shuttles, and they will travel back to the abandoned planet Antioch. To rid themselves of the aliens, Nikos and a few other trusted crewmen will remain aboard the ship and conduct a random jump out of the galaxy, possibly out of the universe, thereby taking the alien vessel with them.

The plan is put into action and while the alien vessel struggles to free itself from the Argonos, the two starships are soon gone. The story ends with the convoy still on its way to Antioch, although Bartolomeo hopes for the future.
