= Patricia Geary =

American author

- Occupation: Author
- Writing career
- Genre: Fantasy
- Notable awards: Philip K. Dick Award (1987)

Patricia Geary is an American author. After writing two fantasy-adjacent novels, Living in Ether (1982) and Strange Toys (1987), the latter of which won the Philip K. Dick Award, she later found it difficult to sell her third novel as she had a reputation primarily as a fantasy author. Her third novel, The Other Canyon, was published in 2002 by Gorsky Press, and another, Guru Cigarettes, in 2005.

She has taught creative writing at the University of Redlands.
