= Dead Space (novel) =

2021 novel by Kali Wallace

Dead Space is a 2021 science fiction murder mystery novel by Kali Wallace.

== Synopsis ==
Scientist Hester Marley begins working for Parthenope Enterprises, a mining corporation in the asteroid belt, to pay off her medical debt after losing two of her limbs in a terrorist attack. After the death of one of her former colleagues, Hester begins investigating the murder.

== Genre and themes ==
The novel centers around a murder mystery and deals with themes related to racism, xenophobia, corporate corruption, and worker's rights. Publishers Weekly described it as a "locked-room mystery set on an asteroid mining colony."

Laura Hubbard, in a review for BookPage, described the narrative as an exploration of grief through Hester's loss of limb.

== Reception ==
The book received mostly positive reviews from critics. Publishers Weekly praised the novel's fast moving action and suspense. Annie Deo of Nerd Daily praised its central plot, and described its handling of themes as a "a nuanced, thought-provoking contemplation of timely issues".

It received the 2022 Philip K. Dick Award.
