= Neukom Institute for Computational Science =

The Neukom Institute for Computational Science is a collection of offices and laboratory facilities at Dartmouth College in Hanover, New Hampshire. The institute was funded by a donation from Bill Neukom in 2004, then Dartmouth's largest gift for an academic program. The institute provides programs for undergraduates and graduate students as well as encouraging public engagement with computer science through programs such as the Neukom Institute Literary Arts Awards.

== Literary Arts Awards ==
The Neukom Institute Literary Arts Awards are presented to celebrate new works of speculative fiction. The three categories are: Speculative Fiction, Debut Speculative Fiction and Playwriting.

=== Speculative Fiction ===
This award is for any work of speculative fiction published in the last two and a half years or that is about to be published.

==== Recipients ====
The inaugural award in 2018 was to Central Station by Lavie Tidhar and On the Edge of Gone by Corinne Duyvis.

2019: Theory of Bastards by Audrey Schulman

=== Debut Speculative Fiction ===
This award is for an author's first work of speculative fiction.

==== Recipients ====
The inaugural award in 2018 was presented to Best Worst American by Juan Martinez.

=== Playwriting ===
This award is for a full-length play addressing the question "What does it mean to be a human in a computerized world?"

==== Recipients ====
The inaugural award in 2018 was presented to Choices People Make by Jessica Andrewartha.
