= The Little Animals =

First edition (publ. Aqueduct Press)

The Little Animals is a 2019 historical fantasy novel by Sarah Tolmie, about Antonie van Leeuwenhoek.

== Synopsis ==
Antonie van Leeuwenhoek's scientific explorations are set on a new path by his encounters with a homeless, nameless goose-herding girl who is apparently able to hear — and communicate with — all kinds of animals, including the microscopic ones.

== Reception ==
The Little Animals was a finalist for the 2020 Philip K. Dick Award, and received a special citation from the award's judges.

Publishers Weekly considered it "delightful" and "a delicate tale of science and miracles", lauding Tolmie's "careful characterization" and "rich historical detail, subtle humor, and energetic prose".

James Nicoll found it "entrancing" and "gentle", and noted that although the novel "at first appears to be a straight historical", the world it portrays is "not quite ours".

In Locus, Gary K. Wolfe described it as "at once (...) a charming mannerist fairy tale and a provocative account of the birth of our own modern worldview", praising Tolmie's depiction of Leeuwenhoek's scientific activities; as well, he drew parallels between the goose girl and the eponymous fairy tale, and stated that she was "a marvel of liminality and nuance, at times reticent and affectless, at times a vulnerable and lonely girl with an astonishing sensory connection to the natural world".

Strange Horizons called it "simply, subtly, terrific"(despite the sometimes "over-convenient deployment [of the Goose Girl] as a plot device"), and emphasized the book's nature as an "intertexual work, substantially shaped and driven by intimate dialogue with" the work of Ursula K. Le Guin, to whom the book is dedicated.
