= Sarah Zettel =

American writer (born 1966)

- Born: Sarah Anne Zettel; December 14, 1966 (age 59); Sacramento, California, U.S.
- Education: University of Michigan (BA)
- Occupation: Author
- Writing career
- Period: 1988–present
- Genres: Arthurian literature Science fiction Fantasy
- Notable works: Reclamation; Bitter Angels
- Notable awards: Locus Award for Best First Novel; Philip K. Dick Award
- Website: sarahzettel.com

Sarah Zettel (born December 14, 1966) is an American author, primarily of science fiction. Her first short story was published in Analog Science Fiction and Fact in 1991. Zettel's novels have won multiple awards, including the Philip K. Dick Award and the Locus Award for Best First Novel, and positive reviews from critics. Her first novel Reclamation was published in 1996 and her second novel Fool's War in 1997. She has written romance novels and mysteries under the pseudonym Darcie Wilde, and the novel Bitter Angels as C. L. Anderson.

== Career ==
Zettel's first short story Driven by Moonlight was written in 1986, and was published in Analog Science Fiction and Fact in 1991. Her first novel Reclamation was published in 1996; this was followed by Fool's War in 1997. Zettel wrote many science-fiction short stories for Analog and other publications. Stanley Schmidt, the editor of Analog, sent her work back multiple times to fix problems; in 1998, Zettel said she regarded Schmidt "as a really great teacher, and I think that experience is what led me directly to be able to write Reclamation".

As of 2021, Zettel has written 35 novels in genres that include horror, fantasy, romance, thriller/suspense, and young adult. She said "every genre gives you a different view into the art of storytelling". Of all of her novels, A Mother's Lie "holds a special place in her heart" because "I wanted a chance to write a suspense book in which the mother gets to be the hero, and the strength of the relationship between mother and daughter gets to be at the center of the story in a positive way". Zettel writes regency mysteries and romances under the pseudonym Darcie Wilde. Among Zettel's favorite science-fiction authors are Ursula Le Guin – who inspired her to become an author – and Octavia Butler, Mary Doria Russell, and Terry Prachett. Zettel said her ideas come from current events, her earlier reading material, and memoirs based around science.

== Reception ==
Sarah Zettel's first novel Reclamation was nominated for the Philip K. Dick Award in 1997 and won the Locus Award for Best First Novel the same year. Writing as C. L. Anderson, her novel Bitter Angels won the 2010 Philip K. Dick award for best science-fiction paperback. Her novel Fool's War became a New York Times Notable Book in 1997. The American Library Association said Playing God is "one of the Best Books for Young Adults of 1999". Kirkus Reviews and the American Library Association said her novel Dust Girl is one of that year's "best young adult books".

Professor and media scholar Henry Jenkins wrote; "Sarah Zettel's 1997 novel, Fool's War makes an important contribution to the growing body of feminist literature about artificial intelligence, taking the relationship between bodies and information as one of its core themes". John R. Alden of The Philadelphia Inquirer reviewed Fool's War, stating; "Sarah Zettel's thought-provoking tale offers an energetic plot and a cast full of appealing characters". A Publishers Weekly review of Playing God says; "Readers will embrace this complex, multidimensional saga (Zettel's hardcover debut, and the best of her three novels) not only for its depiction of exotic alien civilization and its action-packed plot but also for its pertinent themes of tribalism, intolerance and ecological disaster".

Fool's War was included in Book Riot's list titled "10 Chillingly Possible Sci-Fi Books About AIs Taking Over" and says, "This book does a fantastic job of capturing the tipping point that exists right before an AI wakes up and starts taking some sweet revenge for all those years of servitude". Dust Girl, in which the main character is of mixed race and is half-fairy, was included in a Bustle's list titled "12 Awesome YA Novels Featuring POC Protagonists".

=== Awards and nominations ===
Major awards and nominations in the science fiction and fantasy field:

- Sidewise Awards, works of alternate history, for "The Persistence of Souls" (The Shadow Conspiracy), nomination, 2010
- James Tiptree Jr. Memorial Award, for Playing God, shortlist, 1999
- Locus Award, for Fool's War, 8th place, 1998
- Locus Award, for Reclamation, first novel category, winner (tie), 1997
- Locus Award, for "Under Pressure" (Analog Apr 1996), short story category, finalist, 1997
- Philip K. Dick Award, for Reclamation, finalist, 1997
- Analog readers Poll, aka the AnLab, for "Driven by Moonlight" (Analog Dec 1991), best short story, 5th place, 1992

== Personal life ==
Sarah Zettel was born in Sacramento, California, on December 14, 1966. Her mother Gail Beavers is a retired teacher and social worker; her father Leonard Francis Zettel Jr. is a retired engineer and programmer. When she was 13, Zettel decided she wanted to write in multiple genres. While Zettel was at university, she created "shared worlds" in notebooks with her friends. Zettel obtained a B.A. in Communication from the University of Michigan. She is married to a rocket scientist and currently lives in Michigan. She named her cat Buffy the Vermin Slayer.

== Works ==
Zettel has written multiple books.

=== Science fiction ===
- Reclamation (1996)
- Fool's War (1997)
- Playing God (1998)
- The Quiet Invasion (2000)
- Kingdom of Cages (2001)
- Bitter Angels (2009)

=== Fantasy ===
- Isavalta series
  - A Sorcerer's Treason (2002)
  - The Usurper's Crown (2003)
  - The Firebird's Vengeance (2004)
  - Sword of the Deceiver (2007)
- Camelot series
  - In Camelot's Shadow (2004)
  - For Camelot's Honor (2005)
  - Under Camelot's Banner (2006)
  - Camelot's Blood (2008)
- The American Fairy Trilogy
  - Dust Girl (2012)
  - Golden Girl (2013)
  - Bad Luck Girl (2014)
- Vampire Chef series
  - A Taste of the Nightlife (#1) (2011)
  - Let Them Eat Stake (#2) (2012)

=== Mystery ===
- Palace of Spies (2013)
- Dangerous Deceptions (2014)
- Assassin's Masque (2016)
- Rosalind Thorne series (as Darcie Wilde)
  - A Useful Woman (2016)
  - A Purely Private Matter (2017)
  - And Dangerous to Know (2020)
