= Audrey Schulman =

American novelist

Audrey Schulman is an American author of literary and speculative fiction. She is the founder and co-director of the environmental non-profit HEET, which supports a transition away from natural gas for heating homes.

== Early life ==
Schulman was born in Montreal, Quebec. She studied at Sarah Lawrence College and Barnard College. She holds a degree in psychology.

== Writing career ==
Schulman's debut novel The Cage, about a wildlife photographer who goes on an expedition to photograph the final polar bears before they went extinct due to global warming, was published in 1994. The novel was inspired by Schulman's personal fears about climate change and the impact of global warming on the environment. She published her sophomore novel Swimming with Jonah in 1999. The novel received mixed reviews from critics, including a starred review in Publishers Weekly. This was followed by A House Named Brazil (2000) which received mixed to positive reviews.

In 2012, Schulman ended an eleven-year hiatus by publishing Three Weeks in December. In 2018, she published the science fiction novel Theory of Bastards. The novel won the Philip K. Dick Award in 2019. In 2022, she published The Dolphin House, about a young woman who develops a close bond with the dolphins at a research institute in St. Thomas. It is based on real events.

== Environmental advocacy ==
Schulman founded the Home Energy Efficiency Team (HEET) in 2009. The organization originally focused on energy efficiency in homes and buildings in the Boston area, but evolved to advocate for the elimination of natural gas as a heating fuel. The group maps leaks in natural gas transmission infrastructure, and advocates for the use of geothermal heating as an alternative.

== Personal life ==
Schulman resides in Cambridge, Massachusetts.

== Awards and nominations ==
Work	Award	Category	Year	Result	Ref.
Theory of Bastards	John W. Campbell Memorial Award	Best Science Fiction Novel	2019	Nominated	
Theory of Bastards	Neukom Institute Literary Arts Awards	Open Category	2019	Won	
Theory of Bastards	Philip K. Dick Award		2019	Won	

== Works ==
- The Cage (1994)
- Swimming with Jonah (1999)
- A House Named Brazil (2000)
- Three Weeks in December (2012)
- Theory of Bastards (2018)
- The Dolphin House (2022)
