= Clipjoint (novel) =

1996 novel by Wilhelmina Baird

Clipjoint is a novel by Wilhelmina Baird published by Ace in 1996.

== Plot summary ==
Clipjoint is a cyberpunk novel told from the point of view of the heroine.

== Reception ==
Steve Faragher reviewed Clipjoint for Arcane magazine, rating it a 7 out of 10 overall. Faragher comments that "this is a very enjoyable book, fully in the un-put-downable frame. The first one's even better."

== Reviews ==
- Review by Faren Miller (1994) in Locus, #404 September 1994
- Review by M. J. Simpson (1996) in SFX, July 1996
- Review by Chris Gilmore (1996) in Interzone, #111 September 1996
