= Hunters of the Lost City =

2022 book by Kali Wallace

- Author: Kali Wallace
- Genre: Children's fantasy, Middle grade fiction
- Publisher: Quirk Books
- Publication date: April 26, 2022
- Pages: 304
- ISBN: 978-1-68369-289-8

Hunters of the Lost City is a children's fantasy novel by Kali Wallace.

== Synopsis ==
Twelve-year old Octavia grows up in the town of Vittoria, the last remaining enclave of humanity after a cataclysmic war and pandemic destroyed civilization. The town is surrounded by woods populated with Ferox, magically animated constructs which prey on humans. She aspires to become a Hunter like her mother and sister.

After meeting Sima, a girl who travelled to Vittoria from elsewhere, Octavia learns that there is a world of humans outside of the town's walls.

== Reception ==
The novel received mostly positive reviews from critics. Publishers Weekly wrote that "Richly detailed magical lore, gripping action, and frightening fantastical creatures are grounded by well-rounded characters and the girls’ blossoming friendship." Kirkus Reviews gave the novel a starred review, praising its heroine and writing.
