= Richard Bowker (writer) =

American writer

Richard Bowker (born 1950) is a writer of crime and science fiction novels and short stories.

== Works ==
=== Novels ===
- Forbidden Sanctuary, Ballantine/Del Rey Books (1982) (science fiction)
- Replica (1986) (science fiction)
- Marlborough Street (1987)
- Dover Beach (1987) (science fiction)
- Summit (1989)
- Senator (1994)

=== Short stories ===
- "The Other Train Phenomenon" (1982)

== Awards and nominations ==
- Philip K. Dick Award - Best Novel nominee (1987): for Dover Beach
