= Jeff Carlson (author) =

American novelist

Jeff G. Carlson was an American science fiction and thriller writer.

== Life and career ==
Carlson wrote seven novels, the first three of which are known as the Plague Year trilogy. His 2007 debut, Plague Year, is a present-day thriller about a worldwide nanotechnology contagion that devours all warm-blooded organisms living below 10,000 feet in elevation. Plague War and Plague Zone are its two sequels.

In 2008, Plague War was a finalist for the Philip K. Dick Award, a juried prize which goes annually to the best science fiction paperback original.

Among his short stories, such as those for Asimov's Science Fiction Magazine and the Fast Forward 2 anthology, Carlson also wrote an award-winning novelette called The Frozen Sky, a near-future adventure which deals with the surprise discovery of an intelligent amphibian species in the oceans beneath the frozen surface of Jupiter’s sixth moon, Europa.

In 2011, Carlson published a collection of his short fiction entitled Long Eyes.

In 2012, he published an all-new, novel-length expansion of The Frozen Sky. Its success led to a major book deal with 47North, one of the new publishing imprints owned by Amazon Publishing.

In 2013, 47North released Carlson's epic novel called Interrupt.

In 2014 and 2016, Carlson published two sequels to The Frozen Sky entitled Betrayed and Blindsided.

He died of lung cancer three days before his 48th birthday in 2017.

== Awards and nominations ==
- Novelette “The Frozen Sky” (2007) - First-place winner in the international Writers of the Future contest.
- Plague War (2008) - Nominated for the Philip K. Dick Award for Best Novel.

== Selected bibliography ==
- Plague Year (2007)
- Plague War (2008)
- Plague Zone (2009)
- Long Eyes (2011)
- The Frozen Sky (2012)
- Interrupt (2013)
- The Frozen Sky 2: Betrayed (2014)
- The Frozen Sky 3: Blindsided (2016)
