= Subclade (disambiguation) =

Subclade may be

- Subclade, any taxonomic clade which is subordinate to hierarchically higher clades, especially:
- Subclade, a subgroup of a clade
- Subclade, a subgroup of a genetic haplogroup
  - a subgroup of a human mitochondrial DNA haplogroup
  - a subgroup of a human Y-chromosome DNA haplogroup

== See also ==
- Cladistics
