= Scott Sanders (novelist) =

American novelist and essayist

- Born: October 26, 1945 (age 80); Memphis, Tennessee
- Occupations: Professor, novelist and essayist
- Writing career
- Language: English
- Subjects: Ecology & conservation, personal essay
- Notable awards: John Burroughs Natural History Essay Award (2000); Lannan Literary Award (1995)
- Website: scottrussellsanders.com

Scott Russell Sanders (born October 26, 1945, in Memphis, Tennessee) is an American novelist and essayist. He grew up in northeastern Ohio, part of the time on a military base where his father, a civilian, worked in the administration, and part of the time on a small farm. This combination of settings, military and agricultural, shaped his first book of nonfiction, The Paradise of Bombs (1987). He studied math, physics, and literature at Brown University, graduating first in his class in 1967.

Sanders has won acclaim for his skill as a personal essayist, with a focus on nature, community, and moral vision. He is the author of more than twenty books, which are listed below. A former contributing editor for Orion magazine, he has won numerous honors for his writing, including the Lannan Literary Award and the Associated Writing Programs Award for Creative Nonfiction. A frequent public lecturer, Sanders also conducts writing workshops across the United States, from Florida to Alaska, and New York to Oregon. After earning a Ph.D. in literature at the University of Cambridge, in 1971 he joined the English faculty at Indiana University, where he received the Frederic Bachman Lieber Award for Distinguished Teaching, the university's highest teaching award. In 2012 he was elected to the American Academy of Arts and Sciences. Sanders has served as judge for many literary prizes, including the 2016 Permafrost Book Prize in Nonfiction for Permafrost: Literary Journal.

In 2009, Sanders retired from Indiana University as a distinguished professor of English. During his career, he has spent sabbatical years as a writer-in-residence at Phillips Exeter Academy, and as a visiting professor at University of Oregon, MIT, and Beloit College. He is married to Ruth Ann McClure, a biochemist. They have two children, Eva and Jesse, both of whom he addresses in letters included in The Force of Spirit. Sanders and his wife live in Bloomington, Indiana, in the watershed of the White River.

== Works ==
=== Fiction ===
==== Novels ====
- Terrarium (1985) ISBN 0-253-32956-6
- Bad Man Ballad (1986) ISBN 0-02-778230-1
- The Engineer of Beasts (1986) ISBN 0-531-05783-6
- The Invisible Company (1989) ISBN 0-8125-5382-9
- Divine Animal (2014) ISBN 978-0-9913102-2-7

==== Short story collections ====
- Wilderness Plots (1983) ISBN 978-1-59098-180-1
- Fetching the Dead (1984)
- Dancing in Dreamtime (2016) ISBN 978-0253022516
- Small Marvels: Stories (2022) ISBN 978-0253061997

=== Creative non-fiction/essays ===
- "Scott: Towards a Social Theory of Literature". Telos 18 (Winter 1973-74). New York: Telos Press.
- The Paradise of Bombs (1987) ISBN 0-8203-0903-6
- In Limestone Country (1991)
- Secrets of the Universe: Scenes from the Journey Home (1991) ISBN 0-8070-6330-4
- Staying Put: Making a Home in a Restless World (1993) ISBN 0-8070-6340-1
- Writing from the Center (1995) ISBN 0-253-32941-8
- Hunting for Hope: A Father's Journeys (1998) ISBN 0-8070-6324-X
- The Country of Language (1999) ISBN 1-57131-229-3
- The Force of Spirit (2000) ISBN 0-8070-6298-7
- A Private History of Awe (2006) ISBN 978-0-86547-693-6
- A Conservationist Manifesto (2009) ISBN 0-253-22080-7
- Earth Works: Selected Essays (2012) ISBN 978-0-253-00095-8
- Stone Country: Then and Now (2017) ISBN 978-0-253-02452-7
- The Way of Imagination: Essays (2020) ISBN 978-1640093652

==== Children's books ====
- Hear the Wind Blow (1985) ISBN 978-0-02-778137-3
- Aurora Means Dawn (1989) ISBN 978-1-59098-427-7
- Warm as Wool (1992) ISBN 978-1-59098-421-5
- Here Comes the Mystery Man (1993) ISBN 978-0-02-778145-8
- Floating House (1995) ISBN 978-1-59098-425-3
- Meeting Trees (1996) ISBN 0-7922-4140-1
- A Place Called Freedom (1997) ISBN 978-0-689-80470-0
- Crawdad Creek (1999) ISBN 978-0-7922-7097-3

==== Honors ====
Marshall Scholarship
Guggenheim Fellowship
Lannan Literary Award in Nonfiction
National Endowment for the Arts Fellowship in Creative Writing
Associated Writers and Writing Programs Award in Creative Nonfiction
Ohioana Book Award in Nonfiction for Staying Put
Great Lakes Book Award in Nonfiction for Writing from the Center
Indiana Authors Award, National Winner
Mark Twain Award from Society for the Study of Midwestern Literature
Cecil Woods, Jr. Award for Nonfiction from the Fellowship of Southern Writers
