= Terrarium (novel) =

1985 novel by Scott Russell Sanders

- Author: Scott Russell Sanders
- Language: English
- Publication date: 1985

Terrarium is a 1985 science fiction novel by American writer and essayist Scott Russell Sanders, published by Tor.

== Plot summary ==
In the late 21st century, humans have been forcibly moved into an enclosed network of domed cities connected by travel tubes known as 'The Human System'. The outside world was left because of extreme pollution, and the cities rely on harvesting the seas. Inside these cities, (called the "Enclosure") taboos extend so far as to make uncovered legs and unpainted faces a horrific sin. Due to likely ongoing large scale social engineering there are 12 stages for mating but most women have their reproductive organs removed or are used as breeders starting at the age of 13.

Fear of the outside is extreme, another aspect of the social engineering that was incorporated into The Human System. Hence it is called the "wilder" and people who enter these lands legally on maintenance work are called wildergoers. Exiting The Human System without permission is illegal and might result in execution.

The book focuses on a man named Phoenix and a Wildergoer called Teeg Passio, daughter of a renowned deconstructor of the original Earth cities whose pieces and materials were used to create the Enclosure. The book details how they and a group of others escape out into the wilds and find an outside world they didn't expect.

== Sources ==
ISBN 0-8125-5380-2 lookup
