= Wilhelmina Baird =

Scottish science fiction author (born 1935)

Joyce Carstairs Hutchinson (born Joyce Carstairs; 16 February 1935) is a Scottish science fiction writer, best known under the pseudonyms Wilhelmina Baird and Kathleen James. She was born in Dunfermline.

== Biography ==
She was brought up in England, where she took up teaching temporarily while she tried to finish her MA thesis. She dabbled in writing short stories and thrillers but was published only when she retired from teaching.

After publishing the short stories "Mantrap" in 1961 and "The Seventh Man" in 1962 under the pseudonym Kathleen James in the pages of the British magazine New Worlds Science Fiction, she wrote a story in The Magazine of Fantasy & Science Fiction in 1966 before becoming inactive as a writer until the 1990s.

Under the pseudonym Wilhelmina Baird, three novels were published in the 1990s in the cyberpunk "Cass" series (Crashcourse, Clipjoint, and Psykosis). She currently lives in France.

== Bibliography ==
=== As Kathleen James ===
- "Mantrap" (June 1961). In New Worlds Science Fiction (no. 107, vol. 36)
- "The Seventh Man" (April 1962). In New Worlds Science Fiction (no. 117, vol. 39)
- "The Blind God's Eye" (March 1966). In The Magazine of Fantasy & Science Fiction (vol. 30, no. 3)

=== As Wilhelmina Baird ===
- Crashcourse (Ace, 1993)
- Clipjoint (Ace, 1994)
- Psykosis (Ace, 1995)
- Chaos Come Again (Ace, 1996)

=== Nonfiction ===
- "Read This" (Feb. 1995). Essay in The New York Review of Science Fiction (as Wilhelmina Baird)
- "Wilhelmina Baird: What's in a Name" (March 1995). Interview in Locus #410
