= The Shift (novel) =

1996 science-fiction novel by George Foy

The Shift is a science-fiction novel by George Michelsen Foy. It was published in 1996 by the Bantam Spectra division of Doubleday. In 1997, the book was nominated for the annual Philip K. Dick Award for best original paperback book published in the United States. As of 2025 Foy is on the faculty of the creative writing program of New York University.
