= Amy Thomson =

American science fiction writer (born 1958)

- Born: October 28, 1958 (age 67); Miami, Florida, U.S.
- Occupation: Writer
- Spouse: Edd Vick
- Children: Katherine

Amy Thomson (born October 28, 1958) is an American science fiction writer. In 1994 she won the John W. Campbell Award for Best New Writer. Most of her work is considered hard science fiction and contains feminist and environmental themes.

== Personal life ==
Amy Thomson was born in Miami, Florida. She attended college at the University of Idaho and began writing short stories when she moved to Seattle, Washington after graduating. She published her first book, Virtual Girl, in 1993. She is married to Edd Vick.

== Bibliography ==
=== Novels ===
- Virtual girl (1993)
- The color of distance (1995)
- Through alien eyes (1999)
- Storyteller (2003)

=== Short fiction ===
Stories

Title	Year	First published	Reprinted/collected	Notes
Buddha nature	2013	"Buddha nature". Analog Science Fiction and Fact. 133 (1&2): 76–93. Jan–Feb 2013.		
