= Dover Beach (novel) =

1987 novel by Richard Bowker

- First edition
- Author: Richard Bowker
- Cover artist: Franco Accornero
- Language: English
- Genre: Science fiction novel
- Publisher: Spectra
- Publication date: September 1987
- Publication place: Australia
- Media type: Print (Paperback)
- ISBN: 978-0-553-26810-2 (first edition, paperback)
- OCLC: 16680608

Dover Beach is a 1987 science fiction novel by Richard Bowker. The book was nominated for the 1987 Philip K. Dick Award.
