= Clade (novel) =

2003 novel by Mark Budz

- Author: Mark Budz
- Language: English
- Genre: Science fiction novel
- Publisher: Spectra
- Publication date: 2 December 2003
- Publication place: United States
- Media type: Print (Paperback)
- Pages: 384 (paperback edition)
- ISBN: 0-553-58658-0 (paperback edition)
- OCLC: 53835753
- LC Class: CPB Box no. 2155 vol. 11

Clade is an American science fiction novel written by Mark Budz, published in 2003. In Clade, an environmental disaster called the Ecocaust has caused sea levels to rise and causing additional strains on human resources. The U.S. government, in response, becomes more restrictive on human freedoms, and this novel explores what happens after the Ecocaust.

== Plot summary ==
In Clade, the Ecocaust, an environmental disaster, causes major problems such as rising sea levels and additional strains on human resources. Although civilization recovers from this disaster, they do so at the expense of their previous freedoms. "Polycorps" develop from governments and corporations. The wonders of biotech introduce a new class system where human beings have been socially engineered at the molecular level through a process called "clading." This "clading" process places entire socioeconomic or ethnic groups made to be biologically predisposed to live in particular communities. If a person enters a community that they have not been claded to, the consequences could be devastating, resulting in sickness or death. Although it is not intentionally racist, businesses and retail outlets using this clading process to keep away the riffraff, will simply screen out clientele below a certain prosperity level. Therefore, a black market exists enabling people to buy the right biotech to inhibit the "pherions" in their systems to be placed in a certain clade.

The protagonist is a man named Rigo, a Latino from the San Jose clade who wants to move up in society. Rigo accepts a job at a biotech firm that develops special vegetation for a planned orbital colony. Although his friends look down on him with contempt for selling out, he still maintains a close relationship with his mother, lawless brother, and Anthea, his troubled girlfriend. At work, after Rigo fears being exposed to some dangerous pherions, he finds to his surprise that the company he works for eagerly wants to send some of the plants they've been working on into space; and they want Rigo to supervise the transfer.

== Awards ==
- 2003 Philip K. Dick Award - nominee
