= Mark Budz =

American science fiction writer

- Born: November 1, 1960 (age 65); Cherry Hill, New Jersey, U.S.
- Education: University of Colorado Boulder
- Occupation: Writer
- Spouse: Marina Fitch
- Writing career
- Period: 1991–present

Mark Budz (born November 1, 1960, in Cherry Hill, New Jersey) is an American science fiction writer. Although he began by writing short stories, his novels such as Clade and Crache have been nominated for major awards.

== Personal life ==
Budz was born on November 1, 1960, in Cherry Hill, New Jersey into a family that traveled prodigiously because his father worked for the National Park Service, living in Arizona, California, and Colorado. In 1982, Budz graduated from the University of Colorado Boulder with a bachelor's degree in architectural engineering. After graduating, he worked at several different jobs, including as a sales at manufacturer's representative for ITT Bell & Gossett, in retail sales, as a publisher's reader for a small press, and technical support. Currently, Budz is a technical writer for a software company near Silicon Valley.

In the late 1980s, Budz moved to Eugene, Oregon, to attempt to become a full-time writer, beginning with short stories. Although becoming a short story writer did not work out, he decided to become a novel writer, his first novel being Clade (2003).

He is married to Marina Fitch.

== Publications ==
=== Novels ===
- Clade (2003)
- Crache (2004)
- Idolon (2006)
- Till Human Voices Wake Us (2007)

=== Short stories ===
- Toy Soldiers
- Zinnias on the Moon
- Roatan
- The War Inside

== Awards ==
- Philip K. Dick Award nominee - In 2003, Clade was a nominee for the Philip K. Dick Award.
- Andre Norton Award - In 2004, Mark Budz won the second annual Norton Award for his novel Clade.
