= Dick Lourie =

American poet and author

Dick Lourie (1937) is an American poet, editor, and musician and the author of eight books, with the most recent as of 2023 being Jam Session.

== Career ==
Lourie was a student of Denise Levertov in her first class.

In 1966 he was a co-founding editor of Hanging Loose Press, a small press in Brooklyn, NY, which publishes chapbooks, poetry, non-fiction, and fiction, as well as Hanging Loose Magazine.

In 1968, he signed the "Writers and Editors War Tax Protest" pledge, vowing to refuse tax payments in protest against the Vietnam War.

He has edited, along with Mark Pawlak, two anthologies of high school writing Smart Like Me and Bullseye. In 2000, he released a CD, Ghost Radio Blues, a mix of blues and spoken word. He formerly worked as an editor for the University of Massachusetts. Smoke Signals (film) ends with his poem "Forgiving Our Fathers." A 2001 song cycle by composer Robert Maggio includes texts by Lourie, Mark Strand, and Billy Collins is also titled "Forgiving Our Fathers".

== Biography ==
Lourie was born in 1937 and grew up in Brooklyn, in a family described by him as "Depression era-middle class-left wing-socialist-communist-Brooklyn-Jewish, not necessarily in that order". He currently resides in Somerville, Massachusetts, with his wife, Abby Freedman.

Dick Lourie
- letter jacket
- Dick Lourie often wears a letter jacket with 'POET' on the back
- https://flickr.com/photos/chris_pix/11764182195

== Bibliography ==
- Ghost Radio. Hanging Loose (1998)
- If the Delta was the Sea. Hanging Loose (2008)
- Jam Session and Other Poems Hanging Loose (2020)
