= Cagebird (novel) =

2005 novel by Karin Lowachee

- First edition
- Author: Karin Lowachee
- Cover artist: Matt Stawicki
- Language: English
- Genre: Science fiction
- Publisher: Warner Aspect
- Publication date: April 1, 2005
- Publication place: United States
- Media type: Print (paperback)
- Pages: 448
- ISBN: 0-446-61508-0
- OCLC: 60337747
- LC Class: CPB Box no. 2471 vol. 5
- Preceded by: Burndive

Cagebird is a science fiction novel by Canadian author Karin Lowachee. It was published by Warner Aspect in 2005, as the third book in the Warchild Universe. Cagebird was the winner of the Prix Aurora Award and the Gaylactic Spectrum Award in 2006.

== Plot summary ==
The novel begins with Yuri Terisov, the jaded former protégé of the infamous dead pirate, Captain Vincenzo Falcone, and the Captain of the pirate ship Kublai Khan in prison on earth, where his is approached by Black Ops agent Andreas Lukacs. Lukacs offers to free Yuri from prison in exchange for his help in infiltrating the pirate network, which Yuri agrees to in exchange for the protection of his cellmate Stefano Finch.

Yuri fakes his own death and his is smuggled out of prison with Finch to Pax Terra, the station orbiting above the earth, where he is picked up by his ship. He finds, however, that his ship has been taken over by his Lieutenant Taja Roshan and is first forced to kill her taking back his ship.

Once that is done, he contacts Falcone's former Lieutenant, Caligtiera, about the Black Op's offer, who proposes that together they destroy the Earthhub Military Carrier Archangel. Yuri finds that he cannot bring himself to do this and informs the Macedon of his plans. He destroys his ship and kills Lukacs, who had intended to use the pirate to gain power, then flees to the Macedon whose crew includes two of Falcone's other protégés.

This story alternates with the story Yuri's childhood, which tells how his colony was destroyed by the striviiric-na when he was four. His family was split up and he was sent to live in the bleak refugee camp on the partially terraformed planet Grace. When he is nine, Falcone recruits him from the camp and takes him on as his protégé and eventually as a geisha.

Yuri falls in love with his geisha mentor, Estienne, and is indoctrinated, but this indoctrination fails when Yuri is forced into geisha duties at fourteen, which is essentially prostitution, with the aid of Falcone's cruelty. Despite this, Yuri is eventually given his own ship.

When Falcone's ship, the Genghis Khan is destroyed, Yuri is sent to seek revenge on the Macedon's captain, Cairo Azarcon, by attempting to murder his son, Ryan Azarcon. He fails on his first try intentionally, but almost succeeds on his second, which is what lands him in prison. This portion of the story is told in more detail, through Ryan's perspective in the Universe's second book, Burndive.
