= Ruby Slippers, Golden Tears =

1995 short story collection

- First edition
- Author: Ellen Datlow and Terri Windling
- Cover artist: Matt Stawicki
- Language: English
- Genre: Fantasy and horror
- Publisher: William Morrow & Company
- Publication date: December 1995
- Publication place: United States
- English publication date: December 1995
- Media type: Print
- Pages: 416 (Hardback)
- ISBN: 0-688-14363-6
- OCLC: 32590487
- Dewey Decimal: 813/.0876608 20
- LC Class: PS648.F3 R83 1995
- Preceded by: Black Thorn, White Rose
- Followed by: Black Swan, White Raven

Ruby Slippers, Golden Tears is the third book in a series of collections of re-told fairy tales edited by Ellen Datlow and Terri Windling. It has an introduction, a list of recommended readings, and 22 stories and poems.

== Contents ==
- Introduction – Terri Windling & Ellen Datlow
- "Ruby Slippers" – Susan Wade – a re-telling of The Wizard of Oz from the perspective of a middle-aged Dorothy.
- "The Beast" – Tanith Lee
- "Masterpiece" – Garry Kilworth
- "Summer Wind" – Nancy Kress
- "This Century of Sleep or, Briar Rose Beneath the Sea" – Farida S. T. Shapiro – a re-telling of Sleeping Beauty, focusing on the transformations caused by time and waiting.
- "The Crossing" – Joyce Carol Oates
- "Roach in Loafers" – Roberta Lannes
- "Naked Little Men" – Michael Cadnum
- "Brother Bear" – Lisa Goldstein
- "The Emperor Who Had Never Seen a Dragon" – John Brunner
- "Billy Fearless" – Nancy A. Collins
- "The Death of Koshchei the Deathless" – Gene Wolfe
- "The Real Princess" – Susan Palwick
- "The Huntsman's Story" – Milbre Burch
- "After Push Comes to Shove" – Milbre Burch
- "Hansel and Grettel" – Gahan Wilson
- "Match Girl" – Anne Bishop
- "Waking the Prince" – Kathe Koja
- "The Fox Wife" – Ellen Steiber
- "The White Road" – Neil Gaiman
- "The Traveler and the Tale" – Jane Yolen
- "The Printer's Daughter" – Delia Sherman

== Reception ==
The Toronto Star's Henry Mietkiewicz called the anthology "a stunning collection", writing, "As in Snow White, Blood Red and Black Thorn, White Rose, the editors continue to demonstrate the emotional wallop of fairy tales geared to grown-ups." In a positive review, Publishers Weekly said, "this anthology is a must for those who believe that 'once upon a time' means now". The Booklist reviewer Roland Green said "the writing is consistently of very high quality" but said of the stories that "far too many of them struggle to make oldtales fit the procrustean beds of modern psychology".

Kirkus Reviews praised the anthology, stating, "The fairy-tale tradition clearly retains its imaginative fertility, and the authors have almost without exception risen to the occasion." The science fiction editor Gardner Dozois wrote in The Year's Best Science Fiction: Thirteenth Annual Collection that the book is "in contention for the title of the year's best fantasy anthology" and thought "The Emperor Who Had Never Seen a Dragon" by John Brunner is the collection's "best story".

== Bibliography ==
- Altmann, Anna E.; de Vos, Gail (1999). New Tales for Old: Folktales As Literary Fictions for Young Adults Paperback. Englewood, Colorado: Libraries Unlimited. pp. 140, 256, 305–306, 315, 354. ISBN 1-56308-447-3 – via Internet Archive.
- Altmann, Anna E.; de Vos, Gail (2001). Tales, Then and Now: More Folktales As Literary Fictions for Young Adults. Englewood, Colorado: Libraries Unlimited. pp. 34–35, 260–261, 267, 269, 270–271. ISBN 1-56308-831-2 – via Internet Archive.
- Dozois, Gardner, ed. (1996). The Year's Best Science Fiction: Thirteenth Annual Collection. New York: St. Martin's Press. pp. xxix, 587, 589, 591–592. ISBN 0-312-14451-2 – via Internet Archive.
