= Black Thorn, White Rose =

Book by Ellen Datlow and Terri Windling

- First edition
- Author: Ellen Datlow and Terri Windling
- Cover artist: Tom Canty
- Language: English
- Genre: Fantasy and Horror
- Publisher: William Morrow & Company
- Publication date: September 1994
- Publication place: United States
- Media type: Print
- Pages: 386 (Hardback)
- ISBN: 0-688-13713-X
- OCLC: 29953268
- Dewey Decimal: 813/.0876608 20
- LC Class: PS648.F3 B53 1994
- Preceded by: Snow White, Blood Red
- Followed by: Ruby Slippers, Golden Tears

Black Thorn, White Rose is the second book in a series of collections of re-told fairy tales edited by Ellen Datlow and Terri Windling.

== Contents ==
- Introduction by Ellen Datlow & Terri Windling
- Words Like Pale Stones by Nancy Kress—a retelling of Rumplestiltskin in which the miller's daughter proves herself to be resourceful and resolute.
- Stronger Than Time by Patricia C. Wrede
- Somnus’s Fair Maid by Ann Downer
- The Frog King, or Iron Henry by Daniel Quinn
- Near-Beauty by M. E. Beckett
- Ogre by Michael Kandel
- Can’t Catch Me by Michael Cadnum
- Journeybread Recipe by Lawrence Schimel
- The Brown Bear of Norway by Isabel Cole
- The Goose Girl by Tim Wynne-Jones
- Tattercoats by Midori Snyder
- Granny Rumple by Jane Yolen
- The Sawing Boys by Howard Waldrop
- Godson by Roger Zelazny
- Ashputtle by Peter Straub
- Silver and Gold by Ellen Steiber
- Sweet Bruising Skin by Storm Constantine
- The Black Swan by Susan Wade
- Recommended Reading—Misc. Material
