= The Green Man: Tales from the Mythic Forest =

- Author: edited by Ellen Datlow and Terri Windling
- Cover artist: Charles Vess
- Language: English
- Genre: Fantasy, horror
- Publisher: Viking Books
- Publication date: 2002
- Publication place: United States
- Media type: Print (hardback)
- Pages: 384 pp
- ISBN: 0-670-03526-2
- OCLC: 48383375

The Green Man: Tales from the Mythic Forest is an anthology of fantasy stories edited by Ellen Datlow and Terri Windling. Published by Viking Books in May 2002, the anthology itself won the 2003 World Fantasy Award for Best Anthology.

== Contents ==
- Preface (The Green Man: Tales from the Mythic Forest), by Ellen Datlow and Terri Windling
- Introduction: About the Green Man and Other Forest Lore, by Terri Windling
- "Going Wodwo", by Neil Gaiman
- "Grand Central Park", by Delia Sherman
- "Daphne", by Michael Cadnum
- "Somewhere in My Mind There Is a Painting Box", by Charles de Lint
- "Among the Leaves So Green", by Tanith Lee
- "Song of the Cailleach Bheur", by Jane Yolen
- "Hunter's Moon", by Patricia A. McKillip
- "Charlie's Away", by Midori Snyder
- "A World Painted by Birds", by Katherine Vaz
- "Grounded", by Nina Kiriki Hoffman
- "Overlooking", by Carol Emshwiller
- "Fee, Fie, Foe, et Cetera", by Gregory Maguire
- "Joshua Tree", by Emma Bull
- "Ali Anugne O Chash (The Boy Who Was)", by Carolyn Dunn
- "Remnants", by Kathe Koja
- "The Pagodas of Ciboure", by M. Shayne Bell
- "Green Men", by Bill Lewis
- "The Green Word", by Jeffrey Ford
- About the Editors (The Green Man: Tales from the Mythic Forest), by uncredited
- About the Artist (The Green Man: Tales from the Mythic Forest), by uncredited

== Reprints ==
- Penguin Books, April 2004.
