= The Wood Wife =

1996 novel by Terri Windling

- First edition
- Author: Terri Windling
- Cover artist: Susan Seddon Boulet
- Language: English
- Genre: Magical realism
- Publisher: Tor Books
- Publication date: 1996

The Wood Wife is a novel by American writer Terri Windling, published by Tor Books in 1996. It won the Mythopoeic Award for Novel of the Year. It is Windling's first novel; she is better known as a longtime editor of fantasy and speculative fiction. Set in the mountain outskirts of contemporary Tucson, Arizona, the novel could equally be described as magical realism, contemporary fantasy, or mythic fiction. Windling draws on myth, folklore, poetry, and the history of surrealist art to tell the story of a woman who finds her muse in a spirited desert landscape. The plot revolves around a reclusive English poet, Davis Cooper, and his lover, Mexican surrealist painter Anna Naverra—a character reminiscent of the real-life Mexican painter Remedios Varo.

Windling subsequently published a very loosely connected story, "The Color of Angels", in 1997.

== Plot summary ==
The plot follows journalist, biographer, and former poet Maggie Black as she inherits property from her former mentor, the reclusive poet Davis Cooper; he had previously shared the land with his late lover, the painter Anna Naverra. Though Cooper and Naverra are dead before the action of the book takes place, the chapters end with excerpts from their letters to each other, bringing them into the narrative. Many years prior, she had approached Cooper about writing his biography, and he declined. Now, as she takes up residence at his former home in the mountains of the Desert Southwest, she regards her inheritance as tacit permission to pursue that biography. Maggie is forty years old, moving to the desert and leaving Los Angeles and her ex-husband behind her, Maggie becomes friends with some of the locals. Slowly, she begins to see and develop relationships with apparently mythical, impossible creatures residing in the area, including six guardians of earth, sky, and the four cardinal directions as well as a number of animal spirits (e.g. Owl Boy and Rabbit Woman) that she had thought only to exist in Naverra's paintings and Cooper's poetry. The magic of the desert incorporates both Native American and Celtic mythologies. Naverra had gone mad and killed herself, and Cooper was the victim of a mysterious murder. Maggie wonders if she will share their fate.

== Critical reception ==
Author Charles DeLint (a fellow member of Terri Windling's Endicott Studio project) praised the novel as "gorgeous, lyric in places, spare in others, always just right. The characters are distinct, the relationships between them revealing and truthful." Eleanor Farrell appreciated the "clear straightforward tale, bringing the magic of the Sante Fe [sic] mountains quietly to the surface and into the life of her main character," but complained that there is "nobody ordinary in her entire population of characters."

Eco-feminist scholar Robin Murray sees The Wood Wife as an example of how writing can break free of previously established binaries separating women/nature from men/culture. She writes that "through its magical realism, [the book] moves beyond binaries and allows its main characters to attain a subjectivity that acknowledges that the so-called "creatures" of the desert are also subjects rather than objects." Citing fellow scholar Gretchen Legler, she asserts that a key component of this breaking down of binaries is "an ethic of caring friendship" or a "loving eye" exhibited by the relationships in the novel.

Jo Walton writes about several themes regarding creativity and place in the novel. She writes of it as a "rural fantasy" and a "regional American fantasy" with particular attention to both the mythological context of people indigenous to the southwest and the mythologies brought by European settlers, including Davis Cooper. Cooper and Naverra represent an earlier generation of poets and artists inspired by the locality of the book, while Maggie and Juan del Rio (a painter among Maggie's new friends) are a new generation. All four reflect their relationship with the land and its spirits in their art. Walton also highlights the theme of romantic partners who each have their own creative pursuits, and the different ways of supporting a partner's artistic efforts.

Walton and DeLint both note that Windling is best known as an editor and anthologist of contemporary, mythic fantasy rather than an author. Both noted her editorial acumen, and praise her writing in that context. Echoing DeLint's description of the writing as "always just right," Walton writes that the novel "hits a sweet spot for me where I just love everything it's doing."
