= Mythic Journeys =

Coordinates: 33°45′22.0″N 84°21′58.5″W

Mythic Journeys is a performance festival and conference gathering held in Atlanta, Georgia, United States. Founded in 2004, it began as a celebration of the works of Joseph Campbell and has expanded into a celebration of the role of myth and storytelling in the modern world.

Organized by the Mythic Imagination Institute, the conference attracts such guests as Deepak Chopra, James Hillman, Robert Bly, Janis Ian, John and Caitlin Matthews, Wendy and Brian Froud, Joyce Carol Oates, Terri Windling, Ulla Suokko, and many other participants from such fields as psychology, religion, science, literature, education, entertainment, and the arts.

== Mythic Journeys documentary ==
Released in 2009, the documentary film Mythic Journeys was written and directed by Stephen and Whitney Boe. With footage taken from the 2006 Mythic Journeys festival, the movie includes animation and short film segments about the role of mythology and mysticism in modern society and storytelling, featuring interviews with Stephen Aizenstat, Ari Berk, Michael Beckwith, Tom Blue Wolf, Jean Shinoda Bolen, José Andres Botran, Duncan Campbell, Deepak Chopra, Honora Foah, Maren Tonder Hansen, Michael Karlin, Lynne Kaufman, Tricia Klink, Ellen Kushner, Michael Meade, Michelle Nunn, George Rosch, Delia Sherman, Sobonfu Somé, and Robert Walter. Documentary footage is placed within a frame story of Vikram and Betal for which Brian and Wendy Froud created the puppets and actors Tim Curry, Mark Hamill and Lance Henriksen provided the voices.
