= Modern fantasy =

Modern fantasy may refer to:

- Contemporary fantasy, works of fantasy that are set in the time period they are written
  - Urban fantasy, works of contemporary fantasy that are often set in modern cities
- Fantasy works written in the late modern period
