= Ari Berk =

American novelist

- Born: March 7, 1967 (age 59); Los Angeles, California, US
- Education: Humboldt State University; University of Arizona
- Occupations: Children's author; columnist; novelist; poet; professor; screenwriter; short story writer
- Writing career
- Genres: Children's fiction, dark fantasy, fantasy, gothic, mythology, non-fiction, poetry, young adult
- Notable works: The Undertaken trilogy, the Secret History series, William Shakespeare: His Life and Times, Goblins!, Lady Cottington's Pressed Fairy Letters, The Runes of Elfland
- Website: ariberk.com

Ari Berk (born March 7, 1967) is an American writer, folklorist, artist, and a scholar of literature, iconography, and comparative myth. He holds degrees in ancient history (B.A.), American Indian Studies (M.A.), and a comparative literature and culture (Ph.D.) degree from Humboldt State University and the University of Arizona. The latter is from the University of Arizona. His dissertation was directed by Pulitzer Prize winner N. Scott Momaday and Berk was appointed to the committee which developed the first American Indian Studies doctoral program in the United States.

== Career ==
Berk is the author of numerous books for children and adults. He collaborated with fairy artist Brian Froud on The Runes of Elfland and Goblins!, and was one of the authors of the Lady Cottington series, along with Terry Jones and others. Berk began his interactive Secret History children's mythology series in the mid-2000s with The Secret History of Giants, and then wrote The Secret History of Mermaids and Merfolk and The Secret History of Hobgoblins. The Secret History of Giants won both a 2008 Recommended Parents' Choice Award and a 2009 Notable Award from The National Council of Teachers of English.

He is a professor of English at Central Michigan University in Mount Pleasant and teaches mythology, folklore, American Indian studies, and medieval literature. Berk is the former editor of the Folksroots section of Realms of Fantasy magazine. He sits on the board of directors of the Mythic Imagination Institute based in Atlanta. He was born in California and grew up in the state. He lives in Michigan with his wife and son.

== Awards ==
- The Secret History of Giants: Recommended Award 2008, Parents' Choice Award
- The Secret History of Giants: Notable Award 2009, The National Council of Teachers of English
- William Shakespeare: His Life and Times: Children's Choice Award 2010, School Library Association

== Bibliography ==
=== Books ===
- Undertaken Trilogy: Lych Way (2014), Simon & Schuster
- Undertaken Trilogy: Mistle Child (2013), Simon & Schuster
- Undertaken Trilogy: Death Watch (2011), Simon & Schuster
- Nightsong (2012), Simon and Schuster
- The Secret History of Hobgoblins (2010), Templar Books
- William Shakespeare His Life and Times (2010), Templar Books
- The Secret History of Mermaids and Merfolk (2009), Templar Books
- How To Be A Viking (2008), Templar Books
- Coyote Speaks (2008), Abrams Books
- The Secret History of Giants (2008), Templar Books
- Lady Cottington's Pressed Fairy Letters (2005), Abrams Books
- Goblins! (2004), Abrams Books
- The Runes of Elfland (2003), Abrams Books

=== Magazine articles ===
- Back Over the Wall - Charles Vess Revisits the World of Stardust (2007), Realms of Fantasy
- The Lore of Simple Things - Milk, Honey, and Bread in Myth and Legend (2005), Realms of Fantasy
- The Dance of the Labryrinth (2004), Realms of Fantasy
- The Song of the Sampo - Mystery and the Numinous in the Kalevala (2004), Realms of Fantasy
- Where the White Stag Runs - Boundary and Transformation in Deer Myths (2003), Realms of Fantasy
- Penance, Power and Pursuit - On the Trail of the Wild Hunt (2002), Realms of Fantasy
- A Rune With A View: An Introduction To The Visionary Alphabet of the Northern World (2002), Realms of Fantasy
- Of Travels and Travails - Imagination, Landscape and Narrative (2001), Language Arts Journal of Michigan

=== Poems ===
- Anatomy, Winter Finds the World on Fire, Rings, A Rune of Loss, Night Thoughts (2007), Creative Journal VII
- Night Thoughts: Sheherazade (2001), Endicott Studio Online Journal
- Anatomies (2001), The Quest for the Green Man
- Bag of Medicine and Wind (1999), Endicott Studio Online Journal
- Paserik Burial (1998), Endicott Studio Online Journal

=== Screenplays ===
- Lanval (2009), Shared Legends Project

=== Short stories ===
- Missing Limb (2009), Ravens In The Library
