= Yarrow (novel) =

1989 fantasy novel by Charles de Lint

- First edition
- Author: Charles de Lint
- Language: English
- Genre: Contemporary fantasy, urban fantasy
- Published: 1989 (Ace Books)
- Publication place: Canada
- Media type: Print (Paperback & Hardback)
- ISBN: 0-441-94000-5
- OCLC: 15045713

Yarrow: An Autumn Tale is an urban fantasy novel by Charles de Lint, set in 1980s Ottawa. The plot concerns a fantasy writer who has a secret source of inspiration: when she dreams, she visits a world where magic is real. Unknown to her, a supernatural predator who feeds on dreams is feeding on her and destroying that world.
