= Patricia Briggs =

American novelist (born 1965)

- Briggs is Dragon Con in 2026
- Born: December 21, 1965 (age 60); Butte, Montana, U.S.
- Occupation: Novelist
- Writing career
- Pen name: Patricia Briggs
- Language: English
- Period: 1993–present
- Genres: Fantasy, urban fantasy
- Notable work: Mercy Thompson series
- Website: patriciabriggs.com

Patricia Briggs (born December 21, 1965) is an American writer of fantasy since 1993, and author of the Mercy Thompson urban fantasy series.

== Biography ==
Patricia Briggs was born in 1965 in Butte, Montana, United States. She now resides in Benton City, Washington.

Briggs began writing in 1990 and published her first novel Masques in 1993, and has primarily written in the fantasy and urban fantasy genres.

Her ninth novel, Moon Called, was published in 2006, and was the first in the Mercy Thompson series. The book made it to the USA Today bestseller lists.

The second book in the series, Blood Bound, made The New York Times Best Seller list.

The fifth book in the series, Silver Borne, debuted at No. 1 on The New York Times' Hardcover Fiction list for the week of April 18, 2010.

== Published works ==
=== Sianim series ===
1. Masques (1993) also in Shifter's Wolf
2. Wolfsbane (2010) also in Shifter's Wolf
3. Steal the Dragon (1995)
4. When Demons Walk (1998)

=== Hurog duology ===
1. Dragon Bones (2002)
2. Dragon Blood (2003)

=== Raven duology ===
1. Raven's Shadow (2004)
2. Raven's Strike (2005)

=== Mercyverse ===
For the complete Timeline for the "Mercyverse"

==== Mercy Thompson series ====
Briggs's Mercy Thompson series follows titular protagonist, Mercedes Thompson, through a series of misadventures featuring werewolves, vampires, and magical and otherworldly creatures from the fictional 'land of the Fae.'

#	Title	Publication Date	Awards	Comments
1	Moon Called	2006		
2	Blood Bound	2007		
3	Iron Kissed	2008		
4	Bone Crossed	2009		
5	Silver Borne	2010	Endeavour Award nominee	
6	River Marked	2011	Endeavour Award nominee	
7	Frost Burned	2013		
8	Night Broken	2014	Endeavour Award nominee	
9	Fire Touched	2016		
10	Silence Fallen	2017		
11	Storm Cursed	2019		
12	Smoke Bitten	2020		
13	Soul Taken	2022		
14	Winter Lost	2024		

==== Alpha and Omega series ====
This stand-alone series is woven throughout the Mercyverse, following Anna Latham, a fierce and empathetic werewolf, and Charles Cornick, the enforcer of the North American werewolves. Alpha and Omega begins while Mercy's story in Moon Called occurs. Then, starting with Cry Wolf, which is set right after the events of Moon Called, the series run parallel.

#	Title	Publication Date	Anthology	Comments
0.5	Alpha and Omega	2007	On the Prowl Shifting Shadows	As his father's enforcer, Charles Cornick is sent to Chicago to investigate and deal with a problematic pack alpha. En route, Charles Cornick meets Anna Latham, a woman the Chicago pack abused into submission. But she is no submissive – with Charles' fierce protection at her back, Anna finds a new sense of self and learns the true strength in who she is – an Omega.
1	Cry Wolf	2008		Using her abilities as a rare Omega, Anna helps Charles hunt a dark, magic-bound, rogue werewolf and black witch, who threatens the survival of the whole pack. Anna learns more about herself as an Omega.
2	Hunting Ground	2009		A 2010 Endeavour Award finalist. When Anna is attacked by vampires using pack magic, the kind of power only werewolves should be able to draw on, Charles and Anna must combine their talents to hunt down whoever is behind it all or risk losing everything
3	Fair Game	2012		Anna and Charles help the FBI track a local serial killer, who targets the preternatural.
4	Dead Heat	2015		While on vacation to visit one of Charles' oldest friends, Anna and Charles find themselves in the crossfire of the start of a dangerous war with the fae.
5	Burn Bright	2018		Heading into the mountainous wilderness, Anna and Charles must use their skills to track down attackers and survive the reopening of a painful chapter in the past that springs from the darkest magic of the witchborn.
6	Wild Sign	2021		Anna and Charles must discover what could make an entire community disappear—before it is too late.
7	Steel Rain	2027		

=== Stand-alone novels ===
- The Hob's Bargain (2001)

=== Graphic novels ===
Set in the same world as the Mercy Thompson series

- Mercy Thompson: Homecoming (2009)
- Patricia Briggs' Mercy Thompson: Moon Called (2012)
- Cry Wolf: Alpha and Omega (2012)
- Mercy Thompson: Hopcross Jilly (2014)

=== Anthologies and collections ===
Anthology or Collection	Contents	Publication Date	Publisher	Comments
Adventures of Sword and Sorcery Magazine #6	Wishing Well	1999	Double Star Press	Edited by Randy Dannenfelser. Also available on Patricia Briggs' website.
Silver Birch, Blood Moon	The Price	1999		edited by Terri Windling and Ellen Datlow.
On the Prowl	Alpha and Omega	2007		
Wolfsbane and Mistletoe	Star of David	2008		
Strange Brew	Seeing Eye	2009		
Naked City	Fairy Gifts	2011		
Home Improvement: Undead Version	Gray	2011		
Down These Strange Streets	In Red, With Pearls	2011		
The Urban Fantasy Anthology	Seeing Eye	2011		
Shifter's Wolf	Masques Wolfsbane	2012		(Aralorn Novels)
Weird Detectives: Recent Investigations	Star of David	2013		
Shifting Shadows	Silver Roses in Winter Redemption Hollow Fairy Gifts Gray Alpha and Omega Seeing Eye The Star of David In Red, with Pearls	2014		An anthology of short fiction set in Mercedes Thompson's world
A Fantastic Holiday Season: The Gift of Stories	Unappreciated Gifts	2014		
Fantastic Hope	Asil and the Not-Date	2020		
Heroic Hearts	Dating Terrors	2021		Follows Asil and the Not-Date
Blind Date with a Werewolf	Unappreciated Gifts Must Love Cats Aftermath Asil and the Not-Date Dating Terrors Scheherazade	2025		A novel in stories. Includes Asil's five dates (three reprinted and two new ones). Nominated for the Endeavour Award.
