= Silver Birch, Blood Moon =

- Author: edited by Terri Windling, Ellen Datlow
- Cover artist: Thomas Canty
- Language: English
- Genre: Fantasy
- Publisher: Avon Books
- Publication date: 1999
- Publication place: United States
- Media type: Print (hardback)
- Pages: 371 pp
- ISBN: 0-380-78622-2
- OCLC: 40489333
- Preceded by: Black Swan, White Raven
- Followed by: Black Heart, Ivory Bones

Silver Birch, Blood Moon is an anthology of fantasy stories edited by Terri Windling and Ellen Datlow. It is one of a series of anthologies edited by the pair centered on re-told fairy tales. It was published by Avon Books in May 1999. The anthology contains, among several other stories, the Pat York short story "You Wandered Off Like a Foolish Child To Break Your Heart and Mine", which was original to the anthology and was nominated for a Nebula Award for Best Short Story. The anthology itself won the 2000 World Fantasy Award for Best Anthology.

== Contents ==
- Introduction (Silver Birch, Blood Moon), by Terri Windling and Ellen Datlow
- "Kiss Kiss", by Tanith Lee
- "Carabosse", by Delia Sherman
- "The Price", by Patricia Briggs
- "Glass Coffin", by Caitlín R. Kiernan
- "The Vanishing Virgin", by Harvey Jacobs
- "Clad in Gossamer", by Nancy Kress
- "Precious", by Nalo Hopkinson
- "The Sea Hag", by Melissa Lee Shaw
- "The Frog Chauffeur", by Garry Kilworth
- "The Dybbuk in the Bottle", by Russell William Asplund
- "The Shell Box", by Karawynn Long
- "Ivory Bones", by Susan Wade
- "The Wild Heart", by Anne Bishop
- "You Wandered Off Like a Foolish Child to Break Your Heart and Mine", by Pat York
- "Arabian Phoenix", by India Edghill
- "Toad-Rich", by Michael Cadnum
- "Skin So Green and Fine", by Wendy Wheeler
- "The Willful Child, the Black Dog, and the Beanstalk", by Melanie Tem
- "Locks", by Neil Gaiman
- "Marsh-Magic", by Robin McKinley
- "Toad", by Patricia A. McKillip
- "Recommended Reading (Silver Birch, Blood Moon), by Ellen Datlow and Terri Windling

== Reprints ==
- Prime Books, November 2008.
- Open Road Integrated Media, September 2014 ebook.
