= The Riddle of the Wren =

1984 fantasy novel by Charles de Lint

- First edition
- Author: Charles de Lint
- Genre: Fantasy
- Publisher: Ace Books
- Publication date: 1984
- Publication place: Canada
- ISBN: 0-441-72229-6
- OCLC: 10900735

The Riddle of the Wren is a Celtic fantasy novel written by Canadian author Charles de Lint. Published in 1984 by Ace Books, it was de Lint's first novel. It was republished in 2002 by Firebird Fantasy, an imprint of Penguin Group. The Riddle of the Wren is set in an alternate universe, and is heavily influenced by the works of J. R. R. Tolkien, particularly The Hobbit. The novel's main character Minda Sealy journeys into other worlds to confront Ildran the Dream-master and save the Lord of the Moors.
