= The Onion Girl =

2001 novel by Charles De Lint

- First edition
- Author: Charles De Lint
- Cover artist: John Jude Palencar
- Language: English
- Genre: Contemporary fantasy
- Published: 2001 (Tor Books)
- Publication place: Canada
- Media type: Print (Hardback & Paperback)

The Onion Girl is a 2001 contemporary urban fantasy novel by Canadian writer Charles De Lint, which takes place in the Newford universe. It is the first Newford novel centering on the recurring character of Jilly Coppercorn, now a middle-aged woman. The book was a finalist for the World Fantasy Award. De Lint published a sequel in 2006, Widdershins, and a 2007 prequel, Promises to Keep, the latter of which featured Jilly as a young woman.

== Background and origin ==
De Lint has said that he had intended to write a novel about Jilly for years, but he had put it off because he did not relish writing about the child abuse and other nasty experiences Jilly would endure. Still, he made sure to maintain the theme of "how the same traumatic event could so differently affect people who have come up out of the same environment."

De Lint explains the title as follows: "Writing, for me, is a peeling back of layers, particularly with the Newford stories. The more I write about the city of Newford, the more I find hidden below the surface. In that sense, perhaps the city itself should be the Onion Girl. But the heart and soul of Newford has always been Jilly, her layers are as open on the outside as the bright neon lights and cheerful facades of stores and houses, but also as hidden within as what lies underground or secreted away behind closed doors."

== Major characters ==
- Jilly Coppercorn – Warmhearted painter who suffered abuse as a child.
- Sophie – Jilly's friend who can dream herself into the spirit world and has established a city there called Mabon.
- Wendy – Jilly's friend who knows about the spirit world but has never been able to visit it.
- Joe Crazy Dog – A shapeshifter and friend of Jilly's who can take the form of a dog.
- Cassie – Joe's girlfriend, who uses tarot cards.
- Geordie Riddell – Jilly's long-time best friend; they are in love with each other, but have never acknowledged it.
- Lou – A kind cop who rescued Jilly from the streets when she was a teenager; he does not believe in magic.
- Raylene Carter – Jilly's sister, who turned to crime.
- Pinky Miller – Raylene's best friend.
- Toby Childers – A physical manifestation of a fictional character from a children's book, who helps Jilly.
- The Crow Girls – Two powerful beings who can take the form of humans or crows and who may be able to cure Jilly's paralysis.

== Plot summary ==
Jilly is struck by a car and becomes paralyzed on her right side. She discovers she can dream herself to the spirit world like her friend Sophie has long known how to do. Her physical body remains in the hospital bed while a dream version of herself, young and not paralyzed, traverses the spirit world. There she meets her friend Joe Crazy Dog, who can travel to the spirit world while awake. He tells her he has sent for a pair of "crow" girls who might be able to cure her condition, but only after she deals with emotional wounds from her past.

Somebody breaks into Jilly's studio and destroys many of her paintings. Her friends keep seeing on the streets a woman who looks just like Jilly. They wonder if a shadow twin might be behind both Jilly's "accident" and the vandalism.

Jilly meets in the dreamlands a young man named Toby. He is an Eadar – a fictional character who acquires a physical presence in the spirit world, but whose existence depends on there being people who believe in him. Together they spend several nights climbing a huge tree to get some magical twigs that may help both of them.

In flashbacks, the book gradually reveals details of Jilly's past. As a child, she was repeatedly raped by her brother Del. She finally ran away from home and by her teens was a junkie and prostitute living on the streets, until a kind cop named Lou found her and brought her to his then girlfriend Angelina, who rehabilitated her.

Back at Jilly's former home, Del turned his attention to her younger sister Raylene, who never forgave Jilly for abandoning her. Raylene slashed Del's leg, and later ran away with her best friend Pinky. To make money, they performed badger games and ended up killing a dirty cop. Pinky eventually became a porn star, while Raylene started working in a print shop. There she fell in love with one of her coworkers, who taught her how to use computers, but was killed by a robber. Pinky served several years in prison for assault, and during that time she and Raylene began sharing dreams in which they were wolves hunting unicorns.

Raylene learned her sister's whereabouts from an article. On the day of Pinky's release, Raylene bought a pink Cadillac and the two of them rode off in search of Jilly. That is when Raylene destroyed Jilly's paintings, and continued to stalk her.

In the hospital, Jilly and Sophie discover that they can share their dreams as well, and when they find themselves in a forest, they encounter a pack of wolves, one of whom reminds Jilly of her sister. She realizes that Raylene must be the lookalike who destroyed her paintings.

Raylene is upset that Jilly has now invaded her dreams. She wants to find a way into the dreamlands while awake, so that she can avenge herself on Jilly there. She sees Joe on the street and recognizes him from his Don't! Buy! Thai! T-shirt as he slips into the spirit world. By watching him, she figures out how to enter the spirit world herself. She and Pinky kidnap the sleeping Jilly and carry her body into the spirit world.

The dreaming version of Jilly has reached the top of the tree and retrieved two twigs, one of which made Toby real, and no longer an Eadar. The other had no effect on Jilly's condition. But because Jilly's physical body has entered the dreamlands, she feels pulled toward it, and she must climb down the tree to reach it.

When she reaches Raylene, they begin talking. Raylene realizes how silly it is to hold a grudge against her sister for something she did when she was a kid just trying to survive. Unfettered, Pinky points her gun at Jilly and fires – but Raylene places herself in the line of fire and dies. Joe arrives at that moment with a pitbull, which kills Pinky.

Toby reaches the clearing with the remaining twig woven into a wreath containing additional herbs, which is powerful enough to cure Jilly's paralysis. Instead, Jilly uses it to bring Raylene back to life. Because Raylene killed many unicorns, she must never return to the dreamlands, or else Joe's friends will hunt her down. The crow girls visit Jilly and tell her that they cannot yet cure her condition, but they give her feathers so that she can call them anytime she wants.
