= Something Rich and Strange =

1994 novel by Patricia A. McKillip

- Cover of first edition
- Author: Patricia A. McKillip
- Cover artist: Brian Froud
- Language: English
- Series: Brian Froud's Faerielands
- Genre: Fantasy
- Publisher: Bantam Spectra
- Publication date: 1994
- Publication place: United States
- Media type: Print (hardcover)
- Pages: xvii, 205
- ISBN: 0-553-09674-5

Something Rich and Strange is a fantasy novel by Patricia A. McKillip written for Brian Froud's Faerielands series under the inspiration of Froud's fantasy artwork. Its title is derived from a line in Shakespeare's The Tempest. The book was first published in hardcover by Bantam Spectra in November 1994, with a trade paperback edition following from ibooks in October 2005. It was later incorporated into the author's collection Dreams of Distant Shores, issued by Tachyon Publications in ebook and trade paperback in May 2016 and June 2016, respectively.

== Summary ==
Dreamer Megan and pragmatic Jonah are a couple living in a coastal community in Pacific Northwest, she an artist specializing in drawings of the ocean and tidepools and he the proprietor of a curio ship. When Megan realizes her drawings are taking on a life of their own, incorporating elements she does not recall putting in them, she is drawn into a bond with strange jewelry crafter Adam Fin. Jonah is suspicious of Fin, but himself attracted to a singer in a pub whom he later reencounters as a mermaid in a sea cave.

Despite warnings, Megan and Jonah are lured away from each other by their Faerie visitors into an underwater world, into which the latter vanishes. Megan finds she can only recover him at a great cost.

== Reception ==
Roland Green in Booklist calls the book "extremely well done, powerfully evocative of the mystery of the sea; its pacing is, however, definitely on the slow side."

According to Publishers Weekly, "McKillip (The Cygnet and the Firebird) weaves a potent tale, which was inspired by the somewhat frenzied drawings provided by award-winning fantasy illustrator Froud." The reviewer feels the novel "lives up to" its Shakespearean title.

The novel was also reviewed by Carolyn Cushman in Locus no. 405 October 1994, Gary K. Wolfe in Locus no. 407, December 1994, and John C. Bunnell in Dragon Magazine, no. 213, January 1995.

== Awards ==
The novel won the 1995 Mythopoeic Fantasy Award for Adult Literature.
