= Widdershins (novel) =

2006 novel by Charles De Lint

- First edition
- Author: Charles De Lint
- Cover artist: John Jude Palencar
- Language: English
- Genre: Urban fantasy
- Publisher: Tor Books
- Publication date: 16 May 2006
- Publication place: Canada
- Media type: Print (Hardback & Paperback)
- Pages: 560
- ISBN: 0-7653-1285-9

Widdershins is a 2006 urban fantasy novel by Canadian writer Charles De Lint, set in the Newford universe. It continues the events of the 2001 novel The Onion Girl, where Jilly was left partially paralyzed and her relationship with Geordie unfulfilled. It also deals with a potential war between fairies and "cousins." Fairies, according to the novel, came to the Americas along with the European explorers. Cousins are the original inhabitants, who can take the form of specific animals depending on their bloodline.

According to De Lint in the introduction, Widdershins is the last novel he will write centering on Jilly Coppercorn, though he subsequently followed up the book with a prequel about Jilly's earlier days, Promises to Keep (2007).

== Title ==
De Lint's official site notes, "To walk 'widdershins' is to walk counterclockwise or backwards around something. It's a classic pathway into the fairy realm. It's also the way people often back slowly into the relationships that matter, the real ones that make for a life." The term is used in the novel when Timony tells Jilly that the way to enter the croí baile is to walk widdershins around an object of power.

== Plot summary ==
=== Overview ===
Odawa enlists a gang of bogans (a type of fairy) to hunt down Grey, a cousin who accidentally blinded him many years earlier. Odawa has already killed Grey's wife and several of Grey's friends. But when the bogans murder Anwatan, the daughter of a cousin chief, the cold peace between fairies and cousins is threatened. Because Grey rescues an innocent bystander named Lizzie from the bogans, they assume —incorrectly— that she is romantically involved with him, and they begin stalking her, which leads her to talk to Jilly. The bogans attempt to kidnap Lizzie, but through a series of accidents, both Lizzie and Jilly end up in Jilly's croí baile or "heart home", a piece of the otherworld made up of people and places she unknowingly created out of her own memories.

=== The croí baile ===
Mattie Finn, a physical manifestation of a character from a storybook Jilly read as a kid, hates Jilly because Jilly projected her child abuse experiences upon Mattie. This version of Mattie carries all the memories of Jilly's abuse as though they happened to her.

Mattie summons up a version of Jilly's abusive brother Del and a priest who also molested her. The priest banishes Timony, a magical little man accompanying them, from the croí baile before he gets a chance to explain to Jilly that she can take control of the place as long as she believes she can. Del transforms Jilly and Lizzie into little girls, then picks Jilly up and takes her to a nearby house. With her martial arts skills, Lizzie beats up the priest.

While traveling through the otherworld, Geordie loses his way and runs into Timony. Geordie realizes he needs Joe's help, so Timony asks him to focus his mind on Joe. Instead, Geordie begins thinking of Jilly, which causes him to be drawn into her croí baile. Del immediately kills him. He continues to exist as a ghost unseen by the others, and he and Jilly finally realize their love for each other.

Joe finds the croí baile, and the pitbull accompanying him manages to enter. Immune to Del's powers, the dog kills Del, giving them all the opportunity to leave. They eventually rejoin Timony, who brings Geordie back to life. Jilly decides to return to the croí baile and confront Del again, realizing it is the only way she can put the wounds from her past behind her.

She returns to the house where the dead Del is still lying, but he comes alive. In a moment of anger she manages to turn herself back into a full-grown woman and hit Del. He immediately changes her again into a little girl. But she realizes that in the moment when she hit him, she was focused, without uncertainty.

With her newfound power, Jilly draws her sister Raylene into the croí baile. While surprised to be there, Raylene acts on instinct and beats up Del. Jilly changes herself into her adult form, then she explains to Raylene what is happening. The two sit down and discuss the different ways they have handled their experiences, and Jilly sends Raylene back home.

Confronting Del again, Jilly declares that anytime he thinks a "mean-ass" thought, he will shrink to half his size. Predictably, he immediately shrinks until he disappears. Leaving the house, she is met by many friendly characters from her childhood, who inform her that she is become the Conjurer (the one with power over the croí baile) now that Del has been defeated.

She coaxes Mattie to read a piece she has written on her abuse experiences and how she recast them on Mattie. She then makes Mattie the Conjurer, a risky move, but Mattie is no longer angry at her. After Jilly leaves the croí baile, the crow girls are able to repair her body at last. She and Geordie decide to get married, and she asks Raylene to be the maid of honor.

=== The fairy-cousin conflict ===
An army of buffalo spirits is planning an attack on fairies, as vengeance for Anwatan's death. Grey seeks the help of Lucius Portsmouth, supposedly the Raven who created the world. Confronted by Odawa outside Lucius's place, Grey persuades him to postpone their feud to deal with the buffalo problem. As soon as Grey knocks on the door, however, a guard apprehends Odawa because it turns out that Grey's murdered wife was Lucius's goddaughter. Lucius agrees to talk to Minisino, the cousin instigating the rampage.

The increasingly remorseful bogan Rabedy summons Anwatan's spirit, telling her that he was part of the gang that killed her, that he wants her help in talking Minisino out of the coming rampage, and that he intends to give himself up. She agrees to help, but does not believe he should sacrifice himself.

Minisino does not listen to the pleas of Lucius, Anwatan, or any of the others. Only Christiana has an effect, by informing the buffalo warriors that they will have no power outside the spirit world because most of them are ghosts. Angered, Minisino kills Joe, and Lucius kills Minisino. Anwatan meets Joe in the afterlife and agrees to bring him back on the condition that he protect Rabedy from harm.

On trial, Odawa faces either death or banishment. Grey proposes that he simply be freed on the condition that he will spend the rest of his days atoning for his crimes—and if he does not, he will be hunted down. He accepts the offer.

== Major characters ==
- Jilly Coppercorn – warmhearted painter who suffered abuse as a child
- Joe Crazy Dog – a friend of Jilly's who can take the form of a dog
- Cassie – Joe's girlfriend; uses tarot cards
- Geordie Riddell – Jilly's long-time best friend; they are in love with each other but have never acknowledged it
- The crow girls – two powerful beings who can take the form of humans or crows and who may be able to cure Jilly's paralysis
- Lizzie Mahone – spunky young fiddler who gets pulled into a conflict in the spirit world by accident
- Galfreya/Mother Crone – member of the fairy court who is dating Geordie
- Del – Jilly's abusive brother; though now a middle-aged drunk in a trailer park, the version of him she meets in the croí baile is simply a physical manifestation of her memory of his younger self
- Christiana Tree – the "shadow" of Geordie's brother Christy, who started out as aspects of Christy's self that he wished to reject and became his friend, named for a combination of himself and his first crush, a girl named Ana
- Grey – a cousin who plucked out Odawa's eyes when Odawa was in fish form, without realizing Odawa was alive
- Walker – a cousin who is chief of the deer clan
- Anwatan – Walker's daughter, whom the bogans murder
- Edgan – a "techno treekin," a creature that formed itself by gradually replacing its original organic body with pieces of electronics
- Odawa – a cousin from the salmon clan who relentlessly pursues Grey for having blinded him
- Rabedy – a member of the bogan gang that killed Anwatan; comes to regret the destruction he has caused
- Timony – a "doonie," a magical little man who can transform himself into a pony
- Lucius Portsmouth – supposedly the Raven who created the world, he does not always remember that far back and claims to have little power now
- Honey – a pitbull Joe has rescued
- Minisino – a cousin who tries to instigate a war against fairies
