= Dreams of Distant Shores =

2016 collection of fantasy stories by Patricia A. McKillip

- Cover of first edition
- Author: Patricia A. McKillip
- Cover artist: Thomas Canty
- Language: English
- Genre: Fantasy
- Publisher: Tachyon Publications
- Publication date: 2016
- Publication place: United States
- Media type: Print (trade paperback), ebook
- Pages: 274
- ISBN: 978-1-61696-218-0
- OCLC: 920018313

Dreams of Distant Shores is a collection of fantasy stories by Patricia A. McKillip. It was first published on ebooks by Tachyon Publications in May 2016, with the trade paperback print edition following from the same publisher in June 2016.

== Summary ==
The book collects five short stories, the award-winning novella Something Rich and Strange, and one essay by the author, together with an afterword by Peter S. Beagle. Of the shorter pieces, four are original to the collection and three originally appeared in various anthologies.

== Contents ==
- "Weird" (from Unconventional Fantasy: A Celebration of Forty Years of the World Fantasy Convention, Nov. 2014) - A young couple hiding in their apartment's bathroom from a monstrosity raging outside the building trade stories about the odd things in their lives over a picnic.
- "Mer" - Concerning two witches, a fishing village, and the statue of a mermaid.
- "The Gorgon in the Cupboard" (from To Weave a Web of Magic, Jul. 2004) - A frustrated artist appeals to his muse, whose response unleashes the power of Medusa.
- "Which Witch" (from Under My Hat: Tales from the Cauldron, Aug. 2012) - Witch musicians combat a dark threat during a bar performance.
- "Edith and Henry Go Motoring" - a toll bridge takes travelers on an unexpected journey.
- "Alien" - a grandmother hangs out with aliens, to her family's incredulity.
- Something Rich and Strange (Nov. 1994) - mortal lovers, seduced by undersea temptation, must decide if their relationship is worth fighting for.
- "Writing High Fantasy" (from The Writer's Guide to Fantasy Literature, 2002)
- "Dear Pat: Afterword" by Peter S. Beagle

== Reception ==
In a starred review, Publishers Weekly calls the book an "outstanding collection of nine dazzling shorter pieces." The reviewer singles out "Weird," "Mer," and "Edith and Henry Go Motoring" for particular mention, but feels Something Rich and Strange "contains the most gorgeous of McKillip's prose ... and the weakest of her plots," with the caveat that "even weaker McKillip is well worth reading." The assessment concludes that "[f]ans of exquisite prose and ethereal fantasy will need to own this."

Heather McCammond-Watts in Booklist writes "Blink three times quickly to release yourself from the enchantment of these tales. McKillip's tantalizing storytalling cleverly leaves us guessing, as the twists and turns of magic unravel in unexpected ways. ... McKillip has bright, sharp beginnings and shifts the shape of her language to conjure dreamy, dark endings. Her humor is mischievous, and her characters are embedded with a timeless quality as they long for the supernatural in their everyday lives. Fans of her work will devour this, and new readers are in for a treat, like awakening from a lovely dream." She highlights Something Rich and Strange and "Which Witch" for comment.

Kristi Chadwick in Library Journal notes "[t]he seven ethereal tales ... collected here touch on people's dreams and desires" and "McKillip ... once more enchants with this volume, which fantasy readers will devour as they are transported into multiple realities." She also discusses three of the stories without naming them.

Charles de Lint in The Magazine of Fantasy & Science Fiction pronounces that "[s]ome authors we read for their characters and their plots, others for the beauty of their language. " read Pat McKillip for all three. She's gifted beyond compare, a National Treasure who should be cherished by all lovers of literature." He feels the book, "while recognizably McKillip in all the ways that matter, offers some new colors to the palette of her storytelling. There's not a wrong note here." He singles out "Weird" and Something Rich and Strange, as well as "Writing High Fantasy" for "one of the best reasoning points on the question of the importance of fantasy in the broader spectrum of literature."

Tamara Saarinen in School Library Journal characterizes the book as a "collection of fascinating and haunting tales that will linger with readers," and "a strong addition to short story and fantasy collections." She finds the collection's stories "[u]nified by the theme of supernatural events" and "exude mystery and magic in their lyrical texts." Calling it "reminiscent of Kelly Link's Pretty Monsters, she notes that "[y]oung adults who like fantasy tales with strong female characters willing to save themselves and others will enjoy this volume." She also feels it will appeal "to fans of Holly Black, Robin McKinley, and Donna Jo Napoli."

The collection was also reviewed by Gary K. Wolfe in Locus no. 665, June 2016, Chris Kammerud in Strange Horizons, 13 June 2016, and Faren Miller in Locus no. 666, July 2016.

== Awards ==
The collection won the 2017 Endeavour Award for Distinguished Novel or Collection, and placed ninth in the 2017 Locus Poll Award for Best Collection. The novella Something Rich and Strange won the 1995 Mythopoeic Fantasy Award.
