= Wolf Moon (novel) =

1988 novel by Charles de Lint

- First edition
- Author: Charles de Lint
- Cover artist: Dean Morrisey
- Language: English
- Genre: Fantasy fiction
- Publisher: Signet Books
- Publication date: 1988
- Publication place: United States
- Pages: 252
- ISBN: 0-451-15487-8
- OCLC: 54097480

Wolf Moon is a 1988 fantasy novel by Charles de Lint.

== Plot summary ==
Kern, a werewolf, is hunted by a harper who uses magic; escaping, but injured, he finds himself at an inn called the Yellow Tinker. Long ago, he had once tried to find acceptance as a man and a werewolf, and was nearly killed for revealing what he truly is. Kern comes to love the woman who is the innkeeper, and decides to stay, and never reveal his animal nature. However, the harper finds him and threatens everything Kern now holds dear. The wolf moon is the first moon of winter, when the climax of the story takes place.

== Characters ==
- Kern - the main character. A werewolf by birth, he was scorned by his parents and a loved one once they found out what he was. He is forced to run from village to village and into the wilderness, but seeks refuge at the Yellow Tinker.
- Tuiloch - a wicked harper who hunts werewolves and is tracking Kern. Tuiloch can use music to make people do his bidding, if they are not strong-willed enough to fend him off.
- The feragh - A large silver-furred musteline creature summoned into existence by Tuiloch's harping. Most feared by Kern.
- Ainsy - Kern's love interest. Co-owner and caretaker of the Yellow Tinker, an inn, where the novel takes place.
- Fion - A worker at the Yellow Tinker and friend to Ainsy.
- Tolly - The stable boy at the Yellow Tinker, who is killed by the feragh.
- Wat - The simple-minded animal caretaker
- Tomtim - Ainsy's uncle. Co-owner of the Yellow Tinker. Kern saves him from thieves who robbed and tortured him.
