= Mercy Thompson =

Mercedes Athena Thompson
- Mercedes Thompson Series character
- First appearance: Moon Called
- Last appearance: Winter Lost
- Created by: Patricia Briggs

In-universe information
- Nickname: Mercy
- Species: Human, Walker, Coyote
- Gender: Female
- Occupation: Mechanic
- Family: Margi (mother); Coyote (father - it's complicated); Joe Old Coyote (father); Gary Laughingdog (half brother); Adam Hauptman (husband, mate, and lover); Jesse Hauptman (stepdaughter); Aiden (adopted son)

Mercedes "Mercy" Athena Thompson (married surname Thompson-Hauptman) is a fictional character and the protagonist of the Mercy Thompson series, written by Patricia Briggs. The main series, which consists of several stories including Moon Called, the short story "Hollow," and the most recent, fourteenth novel Winter Lost, is narrated primarily from Mercy's point of view. The character also has a comic series by Dynamite which includes the prequel Homecoming, a comic adaptation of Moon Called, and an original story, Hopcross Jilly.

== History ==
In the novels, Mercy Thompson is the daughter of a Blackfeet father and a white teenage mother. Her father, Joe Old Coyote, was a rodeo bull rider, who died a few days after consummating his relationship with her mother, Margi. In the novel Fire Touched, it is stated that her mother and father were together for a 'couple months' prior to his death.

Mercy inherits her father's magic, giving her just enough of an edge to survive amongst the werewolves, fae, and other creatures that may want to eat her during the night. She calls herself a "Walker," a term she uses to describe Native American shapeshifters. She can turn into a coyote at will, has a resistance to some magics, and can see ghosts.

Not too long after Mercy was born, her mother went to the crib only to find a small coyote pup in her place. Afraid and unsure how to raise her, Margi took her to the only people she knew were capable—friends of an uncle who had been a werewolf. This is how Mercy came to be raised with the pack of Bran, the Marrok and ruler of the North American werewolves.

== Appearances ==
=== Homecoming ===
A prequel story. In Homecoming, a graphic novel, Mercy travels to the Tri-Cities of Washington for a job interview and quickly finds herself smack-dab in the middle of a gang war between rival packs of werewolves. As if fangs and fur were not bad enough, Mercy must also deal with the scariest creature of all: her mother, who is convinced that Mercy is making a mess of her life and determined to set her daughter on the right course.

=== Moon Called ===
Moon Called is the first novel in the Mercy Thompson series. Mercy's life is not exactly normal. Her next-door neighbor is a werewolf, her former boss is a grumpy old fae, and she is fixing a Volkswagen bus for a vampire. But then, Mercy is not exactly normal herself.

She's a walker, not only capable of shifting into coyote shape at will but also possessed of a sharp nose for scenting other creatures and an ability to sense magic when it is at work. So when a teenage werewolf approaches Mercy asking for work, she knows what he is immediately. She also knows it would be more prudent to refuse him, but he looks so desperate that she hires him anyway.

Turns out the werewolf, who goes by Mac, has escaped from a laboratory where he was being experimented on. When bad guys show up looking for him and Mercy kills one of them, also a werewolf, she realizes it's time to turn the matter over to the local Alpha werewolf, who also happens to be her next-door divorced neighbor Adam.

Before you can say "from the frying pan into the fire," things go awry and Mercy finds and just barely saves a wounded Adam, whose fifteen-year-old daughter Jesse has been kidnapped by the same people who came after Mac. To help Adam heal, Mercy must take him to Montana, and the pack of werewolves who raised her. There we meet Bran, leader of all the North American werewolves, whose son Samuel is the man whom Mercy once loved and lost.

Eventually, Adam, Samuel and Mercy return to the Tri-Cities to search for Adam's missing daughter. In the process they have encounters with fae, vampires, other werewolves, and a witch or two. Mercy must contend not only with all these creatures but with Adam and Samuel's interest in her and the territorial contentiousness that results from it.

=== Blood Bound ===
In Blood Bound we learn that Mercy is somewhat resistant to some magics such as vampire compulsion or werewolf pack control. Because of her magic resistance, vampire friend Stefan calls upon her to deliver a message to a visiting vampire who has failed to pay the proper respects to Stefan's seethe. Stefan is fearful that the visiting vampire has some type of magic that can compel him to do things he would not ordinarily do and that Mercy is hopefully immune and will be able to report back to his seethe should anything happen to him.

Of course, things go badly and soon Mercy is wrapped up in a hunt for the vampiric sorcerer Cory Littleton, who is causing the Tri Cities area to have an increased rise in violence, harming werewolf friends, and endangering lives of innocents. To complicate things, her feelings for Adam, the local Alpha, are scaring her and her feelings for Samuel, an old flame, appear unresolved. Throw in a bit of vampire, fae, and werewolf politics.

=== Iron Kissed ===
In Iron Kissed we find Mercy at a crossroads in her relationships with the two men in her life, Samuel and Adam Hauptman. Both are extremely dominant werewolves, although Samuel is a lone wolf and Adam is the alpha of the Tri Cities werewolf pack. Mercy must decide which one she loves more because Adam has declared his feelings for her and her lack of definitive response is weakening the pack.

When her mechanic mentor, Siebold Adelbertsmiter a.k.a. Zee, calls upon her to repay a favor to the Fae, she is grateful for the distraction. There have been several unsolved murders on the Fae reservation and the magic on which the fae can call without incurring the wrath of the Grey Lords has been insufficient in finding the perpetrator. Mercy is called in to use her nose to see if she can find an identifying scent of the murderer.

She finds their murderer, and identifies him to Zee. Shortly thereafter she learns that Zee was caught by police at the house of the Fae's killer, with the body of the murderer, and as such is charged with murder. The Fae want a quick cover-up so as not to arouse anti-fae sentiments, and Zee wants Mercy out of it so that she will not anger the Grey Lords and get herself in more trouble. Regardless, Mercy throws herself into finding the real killer and exonerating Zee.

Mercy eventually figures out who did the killing but not before she is kidnapped and sexually assaulted by him. In order for her to move on, she must come to terms emotionally and physically with this tragedy.

=== Bone Crossed ===
Bone Crossed begins with the arrival of Stefan, Mercy's vampire friend, on the floor of her living room, flayed, starved, and barely recognizable. He warns her that Marsilia, the Mistress of his seethe, is aware of her involvement in the death of one of her get, Andre, and tells her to run. The Mistress has had a pair of crossed bones placed on Mercy's door, magicked so they can't be removed, as a sign to other vampires and minions that she is a traitor. While Stefan is recovering, he accidentally floods Mercy's mind with his, reliving the deaths of his menagerie, and Adam brings her into the pack to snap her out of it. The vampires place a magical trap in Uncle Mike's, the fae tavern, that kills one of the pack, though she is revived. The wolves need to negotiate peace with Marsilia, and Mercy needs to get out of town.

Amber, a friend of Mercy's from college shows up to ask Mercy if she will come to their house to investigate her son's claims that there is a ghost in the house. Mercy discusses it with Adam, Samuel, and Bran, who tell her that there is only one powerful supernatural creature in Amber's home city of Spokane, the vampire Jim Blackwood, called The Monster. They believe that he will not notice her, so she will be safe there. Unfortunately, he is one of Amber's husband's biggest clients, and he has an invite to the house, including dinner the first day she's there. In the two nights she is at the house, he bites her and exchanges blood with her twice, claiming her as one of his "sheep", of which she learns Amber is another. The second night she wakes in the middle of the night to find Stefan there, and Amber's son Chad in a room full of frost, frozen to his bedclothes, and not breathing. They save Chad and advise the family to run, heading back to the Tri-Cities. Stephan exchanges blood with Mercy to claim her from Blackwood.

When they get back, two rebellious vampires from the seethe (not made by the Mistress and not easily disposed of because of who their maker is) come to Stefan separately to ask him to help them remove Marsilia. He refuses, keeping his word to the Mistress. Shortly after they both have made their requests, Marsilia summons the wolves and Mercy to a 'meeting' to discuss peace. At the meeting she questions Bernard and Estelle, the rebellious vampires, with an old chair that detects whether the person sitting in it is being truthful. Then she questions Mercy and Stephan, her questions proving that he is no longer hers: this makes his testimony that of a third party, and she uses it to have Estelle killed and Bernard returned to his maker.

Soon after Mercy returns home, Amber's husband Corban appears and stuns Mercy with a taser, and brings her to Blackwood because The Monster has Chad. He has killed Amber, but keeps her animated corpse around to do chores. Mercy, Chad, Corban, and a tree fae called Oakman are kept in cages under the house. Blackwood can absorb the power of whatever person/creature he feeds on. The Oakman allows him to be active in daylight, and Mercy's walker blood will allow him to command ghosts. Stefan finds her, and she convinces him to save Chad, on the condition that should she survive, he will be forgiven for the deaths of the two people he had killed in Blood Bound. The fae walking stick shows up and Mercy gives it to the Oakman on his request. She escapes her cage, and while she is fighting Blackwood, the fae throws it at the vampire's back, staking him. Stefan and Mercy return to the Tri-Cities, where Stefan learns that Marsilia did not kill his people, but merely cut his ties to them so that he would think them dead. He agrees to return to the seethe, but on his own terms.

=== Silver Borne ===
When Mercy Thompson attempts to return a powerful Fae book she had previously borrowed, she discovers the book store has recently closed. She comes to believe that the book must contain forbidden knowledge and that the fae are determined to do anything to prevent the book from falling into the wrong hands. Meanwhile, Mercy's friend Samuel struggles to control his wolf side. Mercy conceals his condition as he fears his father will order his death, while also dealing with the other dangers in the book.

=== River Marked ===
Car mechanic Mercy Thompson has the ability to shapeshift. She inherited this trait from her father. In the story, she first believes she is the only person with this ability until she encounters others of the same kind.

An evil is stirring in the depths of the Columbia River, one that her father's people may know something about. And to have any hope of surviving, Mercy and her mate, the Alpha werewolf Adam, will need their help.

=== Frost Burned ===
Mercy and her stepdaughter Jesse are on a shopping trip. Startled by Jesse's question when she (Mercy) and her father are having a baby, Mercy crashes her car, the Rabbit, into an SUV. Jesse tries to call her dad, but he doesn't pick up. Mercy gets worried and tries to reach him through their mating/pack bond, but she only feels anger, rage and pain. Something isn't right. Also no other member of the pack picks up their phones.

While Mercy works to figure out why the pack was missing and help the remaining members, the story's point of view shifts to Adam. The government organization CNTRP hired mercenaries to kidnap the pack and blackmail Adam into killing a senator. During a CNTRP agent's posturing, he kills Peter, a pack member. When Mercy causes a few of the mercenaries to be caught by the police, they are killed and the mercenaries turn on CNTRP, freeing Adam and the pack.

Mercy is summoned to help Marsilia, ruler of the local vampire seethe, defeat Frost, an ambitious and cruel vampire upstart who wants to take over all North American vampires. His power requires ghosts, and Mercy is able to counter it and help Marsilia win the fight. It is revealed that Frost had a hand in kidnapping the werewolves, seeing them as Marsilia's allies.

=== Night Broken ===
Adam's ex-wife, Christy Hauptman, calls in, she is in distress. A lover she met is chasing her and she needs protection. Mercy agrees to take her in and to find out what is happening. Despite Mercy's kindness, Christy tries to paint her in a bad light and the pack seems inclined to listen to her.

Christy is not Mercy's only problem. The night of Christy's arrival a Gray Lord, Alistair Beauclaire, shows up. He wants the walking stick back, which Mercy had given to Coyote. Now she needs to find Coyote, which isn't as easy as it may seem.

=== Hollow (short story) ===
After considering the future of her mechanic shop, Mercy is approached by a woman named Lisa to handle a ghost haunting the home of a rich man. Along with the newest pack member Zack, Mercy investigates the trouble only to discover it is much worse than expected.

=== Hopcross Jilly (comic) ===
While taking a quick run during the full moon, Mercy and Adam's pack come across a ritual burial site with skeletal remains of four children. Across the site is an old abandoned house that was once owned by an old and mysterious woman known as Hopcross Jilly. They discovered that she was an ancient fae that hunted down naughty children to eat their fingers and toes and bury their bodies in the cardinal directions. Meanwhile, Mercy's stepdaughter Jesse is having a tough time at school due to both the recent discovery of the burial sites and being the daughter of a werewolf. During this rough period, she befriends a new student named Jill who appears friendly to Jesse, yet acts strange.

=== Fire Touched ===
After encountering a troll, Mercy takes a young boy into the packs' protection while declaring the Tri-cities their territory against all others. The young boy, a fire touched human who had been snatched by the fae centuries earlier and trapped in underhill since, is wanted by the fae for the power he possesses. Mercy's declaration has long reaching consequences, and to stave off a possible war, Bran sunders her pack from the packs of America, leaving them to face the consequences alone.

=== Silence Fallen ===
Mercy has found her voice in the werewolf pack. But when Mercy's bond with the pack and her mate is broken, she'll learn what it truly means to be alone.

=== Storm Cursed ===
After Mercy declares the Tri-Cities under the protection of the pack in Fire Touched, Mercy and Adam's home became a neutral ground - a place where humans would feel safe to come and treat with the fae. The reality is that nothing and no one is safe. As generals and politicians face off with the Gray Lords of the fae, a storm is coming and her name is Death. Released May 2019.

=== Smoke Bitten ===
A fae breaks out of Underhill and sets about killing people. Can Mercy strike a bargain that will save everyone from its path? Released March 17, 2020.

=== Soul Taken ===
The vampire Wulfe is missing. When Mercy starts to investigate, she discovers more than just Wulfe have disappeared. Mercy learns of the legend of the Harvester, who travels by less-trodden paths and reaps the souls that are ripe with a great black scythe. Released August 23, 2022.

=== Winter Lost ===
Mercy has lasting injuries from Soul Taken and is receiving terrifying calls from the powerful vampire, Bonarata. When her half-brother appears on her doorstep unable to understand the world around him, she and Adam set off to try to undue his curse. Their journey leads them to a wedding upon which rests the fate of the world. Released June 18, 2024.

== Characterization ==
=== Physical appearance ===
Mercy is described in the novels as being of average height, around 5′6″, and average weight. She has brown skin and long, dark brunette hair, which she often wears in braids. She has a muscular build from studying shisei kai kan. Identifying marks include a tattoo of a coyote paw print (or a werewolf paw print, depending on who is asking) on her belly, below her navel, and buckshot scars on her behind. In coyote form, she weighs 32 lbs. Mercy is approximately 31 years old at the start of Moon Called.

=== Personality traits, abilities, and interests ===
Mercy is described as being stubborn, headstrong, independent, hardworking, thoughtful, caring, and being strong of faith. She can change between human and coyote form at will. In coyote form, she is slightly faster, has much better sight in the dark, and a slightly better sense of smell. In both human and coyote form, she has an acute sense of smell and a resistance to some forms of magic. It has been shown that she has the ability to see (and control) ghosts.

She works as an auto mechanic and deliberately annoys her neighbor Adam, keeping an increasingly decrepit and dismantled car between their homes. The car is deliberately placed so he can see it from his bedroom window, and Mercy painted it to read "For a good time call..." at Jesse's suggestion.

Mercy has a history degree which can sometimes come in handy when dealing with the fae and other very old beings. She bakes when stressed and during pack video gaming nights. She has somewhat regular bad movie nights Kyle and Warren.

=== Character history ===
Mercy grew up in Bran's (i.e. the Marrok, a name taken from King Arthur's round table) pack because her teenage mother did not know how to raise her. Her mother had been in a relationship with Joe Old Coyote who was killed by vampires before they found out she was pregnant. Joe Old Coyote was a real person that the Native American god Coyote walked in for a time (more or less making Mercy Coyote's daughter). Hence her magical abilities.

Mercy was adopted by Bryan and Evelyn, a human-werewolf couple, who she loved and had a good relationship with. When Evelyn died, Bryan committed suicide, leaving Mercy alone at fourteen. Outside her foster parents, Mercy had a difficult time in the Marrok's pack, due to being seen as an outsider and not wanting to follow the rules.

At sixteen, Mercy almost ran away with Sam, one of Bran's centuries-old sons, because she thought they were in love. Bran warned her that Sam mostly only wanted her because she could bear him children, unlike female werewolves who cannot carry a child to term. At that point, Mercy left the Marrok's pack and returned to live with her mother. After graduating from college with a degree in history, Mercy moved to the Tri-Cities and found work as a mechanic.
