= Mythic fiction =

Fiction based on myth and legend

Mythic fiction is literature that draws from the tropes, themes, and symbolism of myth, legend, folklore, and fairy tales. It is usually set in the real world and deals with realistic issues, but a mythic atmosphere prevails; however, not all mythic fiction is fantasy, and the fantastic component is not always blatant. Mythic fiction ranges from retellings of fairy tales to stories based on myths to those loosely inspired by myth and legend, using their motifs to create new stories.

The term was invented by Charles de Lint and Terri Windling to describe their own work; de Lint has said that it fit because of its resonances and because it could reach a wider audience. Windling promoted mythic fiction as the co-editor (with Ellen Datlow) of The Year's Best Fantasy and Horror volumes for sixteen years, and as the editor of the Endicott Studio's Journal of Mythic Arts.

Mythic fiction overlaps with urban fantasy and contemporary fantasy, and the terms are sometimes used interchangeably, but mythic fiction also includes contemporary works in non-urban settings. Mythic fiction also differs from magic realism, as magic realist texts may use surreal or random symbolism in preference to symbolism drawing on myth and legend.

== Mythpunk ==
Author Catherynne M. Valente uses the term mythpunk to describe a subgenre of mythic fiction that starts in folklore and myth and adds elements of postmodernist literary techniques. Valente coined the term in a 2006 blog post as a joke for describing her own and other works of challenging folklore-based fantasy.

In particular, it uses aspects of folklore to subvert or question dominant societal norms, often bringing in a feminist and/or multicultural approach. It confronts, instead of conforms to, societal norms. Valente describes mythpunk as breaking "mythologies that defined a universe where women, queer folk, people of color, people who deviate from the norm were invisible or never existed" and then "piecing it back together to make something strange and different and wild".

Typically, mythpunk narratives focus on transforming folkloric source material rather than retelling it, often through postmodern literary techniques such as non-linear storytelling, worldbuilding, confessional poetry, as well as modern linguistic and literary devices. The use of folklore is especially important because folklore is "often a battleground between subversive and conservative forces", according to speculative fiction writer Amal El-Mohtar, and a medium for constructing new societal norms. Through postmodern literary techniques, mythpunk authors change the structures and traditions of folklore, "negotiating—and validating—different norms".

Most works of mythpunk have been published by small presses, such as Strange Horizons, because "anything playing out on the edge is going to have truck with the small presses at some point, because small presses take big risks". Writers whose works would fall under the mythpunk label include Ekaterina Sedia, Theodora Goss, Neil Gaiman, Sonya Taaffe, and Adam Christopher. Valente's novel Deathless is an example of mythpunk, drawing from classic Russian folklore to tell the tale of Koschei the Deathless from a female perspective.

== See also ==
- Fairytale fantasy
- Greek mythology retelling
- Slipstream (genre)
