= Mythic Imagination Institute =

The Mythic Imagination Institute is a non-profit organization based in Atlanta whose purpose is to encourage a creative response to life, both individual and collective, through storytelling and mythology: "Every life is a story, and a story can change the world." The Institute's main vehicles for achieving that purpose are conferences, performance festivals, lectures, and educational classes.

Past events organized or sponsored by Mythic Imagination Institute include:

- The Mythic Journeys conferences in 2004 and 2006 in Atlanta
- "Ancient Spirit, Modern Voice", an art exhibition at the Defoors Centre Art Gallery, May 1-June 12, 2004, curated by Charles Vess and featuring the works of Brian and Wendy Froud, Terri Windling, Alan Lee, Viggo Mortensen, and others
- The Mythic Journeys 2-hour audio program featuring highlights of the Mythic Journeys 2004 conference, produced by Public Radio International
- "War, Peace, and the America Imagination", an onstage discussion with James Hillman and Deepak Chopra, moderated by Jean Houston, held in 2005 at Emory University in Atlanta
- In 2007, the MII organized the Human Forum conference for the Alliance for a New Humanity in Puerto Rico.
- In 2008, the MII offered a one-year certificate program in Applied Mythology, in partnership with the New York Open Center.
- In 2009, Imaginal Cells Filmworks in partnership with MII premiered the documentary film Mythic Journeys, based on interviews conducted at the 2006 Mythic Journeys conference.

The Mythic Imagination Institute's official website features an online, quarterly magazine Mythic Passages, which includes contributions from renowned scholars, artists, poets, and performers.
