= Anne Bishop =

American fantasy writer

- Occupation: Writer
- Writing career
- Genre: Fantasy
- Website: annebishop.com

Anne Bishop is an American fantasy writer. Her most noted work is the Black Jewels series. She won the Crawford Award in 2000 for the first three Black Jewels books, sometimes called the Black Jewels trilogy: Daughter of the Blood, Heir to the Shadows, and Queen of the Darkness.

== Biography ==
Born in 1955, Anne Bishop started her writing career by publishing short stories. She is best known for her award-winning novels, The Black Jewels Trilogy, Daughter of the Blood, Heir to the Shadows, and Queen of the Darkness. Bishop has also created The Tir Alainn Trilogy, and The Landscapes of Ephemera series. She is currently residing in upstate New York, working on her new series set on the Isle of Wyrd .

Many of her novels are also available internationally.

She lives in upstate New York.

== Works ==
=== Series ===
Speculative fiction series constitute most of Bishop's published work.

Black Jewels

The first volume of the original trilogy, and first novel set in the Black Jewels universe, Daughter of the Blood, was published in March 1998. Heir to the Shadows and Queen of the Darkness, published in April 1999 and January 2000, completed the trilogy. An omnibus edition was released in 2003. Also in 2000, Bishop released her first stand alone novel for the Black Jewels universe, The Invisible Ring. Taking place prior to the trilogy itself, readers were able to pick up the novel either before or after reading the trilogy, though Bishop recommends reading it after. In 2005, Bishop then released the book of four short stories known as Dreams Made Flesh. Once again, this collection of short stories allowed a reader to taste the rich universe Bishop had created without needing to have read the core trilogy. Although, reading the trilogy added to the depth of the individual short stories and vice versa. 2008 brought about another stand-alone novel, Tangled Webs. Then in 2009, Bishop's novel The Shadow Queen was published and here she did something a little different. Unlike her prior releases, this novel was related to characters and events which occurred during another of her stand-alone novels, The Invisible Ring as well as the events of the original trilogy. Shalador's Lady, released in 2010, is the sequel to "The Shadow Queen" and in March 2011, Twilight's Dawn hit the shelves. It contains four more short stories which help to answer some questions reader's had about different parts of the universe/story. Two short stories, "By the Time the Witchblood Blooms" and "The Price" were originally published (March 2000 and October 2004 respectively) in anthologies of short stories from a variety of authors. "By the Time the Witchblood Blooms" can also be found at the end of Tangled Webs.

In publication order the titles are:

- Daughter of the Blood, March 1998
- Heir to the Shadows, April 1999
- Queen of the Darkness, January 2000
- "By the Time the Witchblood Blooms", Treachery and Treason (Anthology), March 2000; in the 2008 collection Tangled Webs, 2008
- The Invisible Ring, October 2000 (Prequel)
- The Price, (Short Story) Published in Powers of Detection: Tales of Mystery and Fantasy, October 2004
- Dreams Made Flesh, January 2005, collection of four Black Jewels stories:
  - "Weaver of Dreams"
  - "The Prince of Ebon Rih"
  - "Zuulaman"
  - "Kaeleer's Heart"
- Tangled Webs, March 2008
- The Shadow Queen, March 2009 – related to the events/characters of The Invisible Ring and occurring after the original trilogy
- Shalador's Lady, March 2010 (Sequel to The Shadow Queen)
- Twilight's Dawn, March 2011, collection of four Black Jewels stories:
  - "Winsol Gifts"
  - "Shades of Honor"
  - "Family"
  - "The High Lord's Daughter"
- The Queen's Bargain, March 2020
- The Queen's Weapons, March 2021
- The Queen's Price, March 2023

Tir Alainn

- The Pillars of the World, October 2001
- Shadows and Light, October 2002
- The House of Gaian, October 2003

Ephemera

- Sebastian, February 2006
- Belladonna, March 2007
- The Voice: An Ephemera Novella, February 2012
- Bridge of Dreams, March 2012

The Others

- Written in Red, March 2013
- Murder of Crows, March 2014
- Vision in Silver, March 2015
- Marked in Flesh, March 2016
- Etched In Bone, March 2017
- Lake Silence, March 2018
- Wild Country, March 2019
- Crowbones March 2022

Isle of Wyrd

- Turns of Fate, November 2025
- Storms of Fate, March 2027

=== Short stories ===
- "The Lady in Glass", 2 AM (Fall 1989), September 1989
- "The Weapon", 2 AM (Fall 1991), September 1991
- "Match Girl", Ruby Slippers, Golden Tears (Anthology), December 1995
- "Rapunzel", Black Swan, White Raven (Anthology), June 1997
- "Tunnel", Horrors! 365 Scary Stories, October 1998
- "The Wild Heart", Silver Birch, Blood Moon (Anthology), March 1999
- "A Strand in the Web", Orbiter, September 2002 edited by Julie E. Czerneda
- "By the Time the Witchblood Blooms", Treachery and Treason (Anthology), March 2000; in the 2008 collection Tangled Webs
- Summer in Mossy Creek (Collective Novel), June 2003
- "The Fairest One of All", Lighthouse Magazine #2, December 2003
- "The Price", Powers of Detection: Tales of Mystery and Fantasy, October 2004
- "Stands a God Within the Shadows", Imaginary Friends (Anthology), September 2008
