= Snow White, Blood Red =

1994 fairy tale collection

- Author: Ellen Datlow and Terri Windling
- Cover artist: Tom Canty
- Language: English
- Genre: Fantasy and Horror
- Publisher: William Morrow & Company
- Publication date: 1993
- Publication place: United States
- Media type: Print
- Pages: 411 (Hardback)
- ISBN: 0-688-10913-6
- OCLC: 26161432
- Dewey Decimal: 813/.0876208 20
- LC Class: PS648.S3 S48 1992
- Followed by: Black Thorn, White Rose

Snow White, Blood Red is the first book in a series of collections of re-told fairy tales edited by Ellen Datlow and Terri Windling. It was first published by William Morrow in 1993.

== Contents ==
- Introduction: White as Snow: Fairy Tales and Fantasy -- Terri Windling
- Red as Blood: Fairy Tales and Horror -- Ellen Datlow
- Like a Red, Red Rose -- Susan Wade
- The Moon Is Drowning While I Sleep (Newford) -- Charles de Lint
- The Frog Prince -- Gahan Wilson
- Stalking Beans -- Nancy Kress
- Snow-Drop -- Tanith Lee
- Little Red -- Wendy Wheeler
- I Shall Do Thee Mischief in the Wood -- Kathe Koja
- The Root of the Matter -- Gregory Frost
- The Princess in the Tower -- Elizabeth A. Lynn
- Persimmon -- Harvey Jacobs
- Little Poucet -- Steve Rasnic Tem
- The Changelings -- Melanie Tem
- The Springfield Swans -- Caroline Stevermer & Ryan Edmonds
- Troll Bridge -- Neil Gaiman
- A Sound, Like Angels Singing -- Leonard Rysdyk
- Puss -- Esther M. Friesner
- The Glass Casket -- Jack Dann
- Knives -- Jane Yolen
- The Snow Queen -- Patricia A. McKillip
- Breadcrumbs and Stones -- Lisa Goldstein
- Recommended Reading · Misc. Material
