= Belladonna (novel) =

2007 novel by Anne Bishop

- Cover of Belladonna by Anne Bishop
- Author: Anne Bishop
- Cover artist: Larry Rostant
- Language: English
- Series: Landscapes of Ephemera
- Genre: Fantasy novel
- Publisher: Roc Books
- Publication date: 2007
- Publication place: United States
- English publication date: March 2007
- Media type: Print (Paperback)
- Pages: 502 pp (paperback edition)
- ISBN: 0-7322-8373-6 (paperback edition)
- OCLC: 225563419
- Preceded by: Sebastian

Belladonna is the second book in Anne Bishop's Landscapes of Ephemera. Following Sebastian, Belladonna continues the story of the battle between the Light and Dark of Ephemera, and Glorianna Belladonna's struggle to destroy, or cage the Eater of the World before it can convert the worlds into a massive playground to use for its own dark purposes. Belladonna also introduces into the duology Michael, a wandering musician who seeks the answer to the riddle that has been haunting his dreams, and whose arrival into the lives of all the original characters has catastrophic and far-reaching consequences for everyone.

== Plot ==
Book ends with Belladonna making herself even more evil than the Eater of the World inside of the school that she had been kicked out of in the events of Sebastian. She traps the Eater of the World and somehow Michael finds a way to bring her back to the world.

== Characters ==
- Glorianna Belladonna - a powerful and rogue landscaper—the titular character.
- Michael - a bard and Glorianna's love interest.
- Sebastian - Glorianna's cousin, Sebastian is a half-incubus, and is married to Lynnea.
- Lee - Glorianna's younger brother, and a Bridge.
- Caitlin - Michael's sister.
- Brighid - Caitlin and Michael's aunt.
- Yoshani - a wise man that lives within Sanctuary.
- Nadia – Glorianna and Lee's mother, and a powerful Landscaper.
- Teaser - an incubus and long-time friend of Sebastian.
- Lynnea - Sebastian's wife.
- Jeb - Nadia's husband.
- The Eater of the World - a Cthulhoid shape-changing monster that has recently been released into the landscapes. It feeds on fear, horror and other dark emotions.
