= Michael J. Meade =

American writer (born 1944)

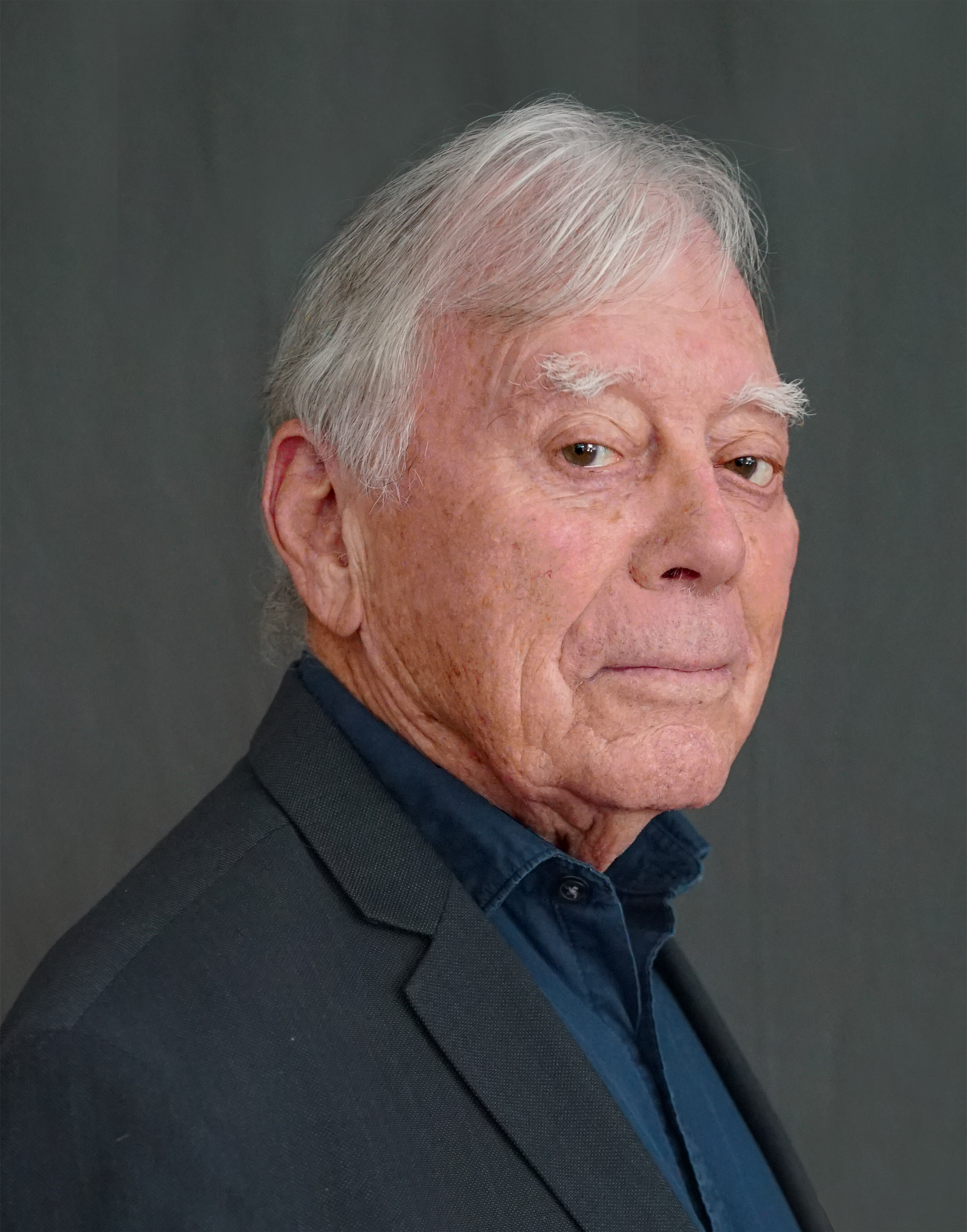
- Meade in 2026
- Born: January 16, 1944 (age 82); New York City, U.S.
- Occupations: Author, mythologist, storyteller
- Website: www.mosaicvoices.org

Michael J. Meade (born January 16, 1944) is an American author, mythologist, storyteller, and was a figure in the Men's Movement of the 1980s. Having distanced himself from the Men's Movement, he continues to publish and teach to a broader audience.

His essays have appeared in To Be A Man, Tending the Fire, Wingspan, Walking Swiftly, and The Rag and Bone Shop of the Heart. The latter is an anthology of poetry, which he edited with Robert Bly and James Hillman. His book Men and the Water of Life: Initiation and the Tempering of Men was published in 1993 by Harper San Francisco. He is the author of the books The Water of Life, The World Behind the World, Fate and Destiny, the Two Agreements in Life, Why the World Doesn't End, The Genius Myth and Awakening the Soul. Meade uses story and mythology as a means of discovery for others to find their inner wisdom and inherent gifts, and he is among those interviewed in the documentary Mythic Journeys, focused on people like Robert Bly and James Hillman, and other leading figures of the Men's Movement.

Micheal Meade is the creator and host of the weekly Living Myth Podcast and looks at contemporary issues in nature and culture through a mythic perspective.

== Philanthropy ==
Michael J. Meade is the founder of the Mosaic Multicultural Foundation, a Seattle-based non-profit dedicated to education and culture. The focus of his current work is to bring healing through story and mythology to disaffected populations from many sectors of modern culture. He frequently works with at-risk youth, homeless populations, returning veterans, prisoners, and youth involved in gang life. Meade leads day-long workshops and residential retreats aimed at healing and personal growth. He collaborates in this multicultural work with leaders like Luis J. Rodriguez and Jack Kornfield.

He is adjunct faculty in depth psychology at Pacifica Graduate Institute, where his honorary degree is from, and often teaches programs on mythology and depth psychology. He earned a B.A. from Saint John's University.

== Publications ==
- Men and the Water of Life: Initiation and the Tempering of Men, 1994, ISBN 978-0-06-250726-6
- The Water of Life: Initiation and the Tempering of the Soul, 2006, ISBN 978-0-9766450-4-7
- The World Behind the World: Living at the ends of time, 2008, ISBN 978-0-9766450-6-1
- Fate and Destiny: The Two Agreements of the Soul, 2010, ISBN 978-0-9829391-4-7
- Why the World Doesn't End, 2012, ISBN 978-0-9829391-5-4
- The Genius Myth, 2016, ISBN 978-0-9716011-2-3
- Awakening the Soul, 2018, ISBN 978-0999634592
- The Heart of Transformation, 2026, ISBN 978-0-9996345-7-8
