= Endicott Studio =

Organization

Endicott Studio (also known as the Endicott Studio for Mythic Arts) was a nonprofit organization, based in the United States and United Kingdom, that is dedicated to literary, visual, and performance arts inspired by myth, folklore, fairy tales, and the oral storytelling tradition. It was founded in 1987 by Terri Windling, and is co-directed by Windling and Midori Snyder. In 2008, Windling and Snyder won the World Fantasy Award for the Endicott Studio's website and web magazine, The Journal of Mythic Arts.

== Background ==
Endicott Studio's stated mission was to "honor mythic artists of the past, support mythic artists working today, and to carry this tradition into the future". Founded in Boston, Massachusetts in 1987, it was named after the street on which it began: Endicott Street in North End. Originally the Endicott Studio was housed in an old warehouse, with art shows, discussion groups for female artists and salon gatherings hosted by Ellen Kushner. Endicott Studio eventually left Boston, carrying on as a non-profit organization supporting projects in the United States (USA) and the United Kingdom (UK). The website was launched in 1997, and eventually the online The Journal of Mythic Arts, a quarterly magazine, which features articles on myth and folklore themes; fiction, poetry, and art. The magazine was re-designed and relaunched in 2007. An art retreat, Endicott West was established in Arizona in 2001. The U.S. home of Endicott Studio is in Tucson Arizona; the U.K. office is in Devon.

Studio members include Holly Black, Emma Bull, Thomas Canty, Heinz Insu Fenkl, Brian Froud, Wendy Froud, Charles de Lint, Neil Gaiman, Ellen Kushner, Alan Lee, Delia Sherman, Will Shetterly, Charles Vess, and Jane Yolen. The writers, artists, performers, and scholars who contribute to Endicott projects come from a variety of countries including the USA, the UK, Canada, Ireland, Italy, France, and Australia.
