= Moonheart =

1984 fantasy novel by Charles de Lint

- First edition cover
- Author: Charles de Lint
- Cover artist: David Mattingly
- Language: English
- Genre: Urban fantasy
- Publisher: Ace Books
- Publication date: October 1, 1984
- Publication place: Canada
- Media type: Print (paperback and hardcover)
- Pages: 485
- ISBN: 0-441-53719-7
- OCLC: 16063466
- Followed by: Spiritwalk

Moonheart is an urban fantasy novel by Canadian writer Charles de Lint. In the story, Sara Kendell and Jamie Tamson, owners of an antique store, enter the Otherworld, and have to team up with a wizard to rescue two different worlds. Meanwhile, she bonds with the Welsh bard Taliesin.

== Plot ==
The story takes place in 1980s Ottawa, where Sara Kendell and Jamie Tamson, owners of an antique store, come into possession of a peculiar ring. At the same time Kieran Foy, a wizard of sorts, is searching for his missing mentor, Thomas Hengwr, while simultaneously eluding the newly formed Project Mindreach from the Royal Canadian Mounted Police. When Sara and Kieran run into each other and end up in "the other world", they find that there is much more to Sara and to Tamson House (Sara and Jamie's house the size of a city block) than previously known. But when an ancient evil resurfaces and threatens to destroy both worlds (and all the people within), the officers, wizards, and Tamson House residents have to learn to work together to destroy the monster.

== Characters ==
- Sara Kendell – A young woman who, along with her uncle Jamie, runs a store that sells all manner of old and curious items.
- Jamie Tamson (Jamie Tams, for short) – Sara's eccentric uncle, who maintains a keen interest in mythology and the occult.
- Taliesin – A Welsh bard, whom Sara meets and makes an immediate connection with.
- Thomas Hengwr – Kieran's missing mentor.
- Blue – A biker.
- Tucker – A member of a secret Royal Canadian Mounted Police unit that is investigating paranormal phenomena.
- Kieran Foy – A folk singer who happens to be Thomas Hengwr's apprentice.
- Pukwudji – A trickster imp who befriends Sara.
- Tamson House – While it is a house, it has an essence about it and its own spirit, and therefore merits being called a character.

== Reception ==
In Issue 31 of Abyss, Dave Nalle noted, "Beneath the familiar surface oif this novel are ideas and combinations of ideas which make it newer and more exciting than anything else published of late ... [it] has the diverse threads and characters which support it tied together nicely by consistent and ongoing action." Nalle did point out some issues with the book, namely that it was not long enough to properly resolve the plot, and that "de Lint's tendency to present a rather flattering portrait of mythical characters whose personalities are mixed at best is a bit trying." Despite these problems, Nalle concluded, "Moonheart is strikingly versatile and enjoyable, and I recommend it with few reservations."

== Reviews ==
- Review by Michael M. Levy (1985) in Fantasy Review, January 1985
- Review by John C. Bunnell (1985) in Dragon Magazine, April 1985
- Review by John C. Bunnell (1985) in Dragon Magazine, May 1985
- Review by Wendy Bradley (1990) in Interzone, August 1990
- Review by David Mitchell (1990) in Vector 157
- Review by Terry Broome (1990) in Paperback Inferno, #87
- Review by Colin Steele (1992) in SF Commentary, #71/72

== Awards and nominations ==
- 1985, IAFA William L. Crawford Fantasy Award winner.
- 1985, Mythopoeic Awards, shortlist.
- 1985, Locus Award, Fantasy Novel category, 21st place.
