= Contemporary fantasy =

Subgenre of fantasy

Contemporary fantasy is a subgenre of fantasy set in the present day. It is perhaps most popular for its subgenres, occult detective fiction, urban fantasy, low fantasy, supernatural fiction and paranormal fiction. Several authors note that in contemporary fantasy, magical or fantastic elements are separate or secret from the mundane world.

== Definition and overview ==
The term is used to describe stories set in the putative real world (often referred to as consensus reality) in contemporary times, in which magic and magical creatures exist but are not commonly seen or understood as such, either living in the interstices of our world or leaking over from alternate worlds.

Frances Sinclair, determining what to call fantasy set in our known world, contrasts contemporary fantasy with magical realism. She notes that in contemporary fantasy magical elements are often kept secret from most people, and notes the amount of young adult fantasy in the subgenre. In contrast, Sinclair points out that in magical realism "the impossible can occur without comment", and the relationship between reader and narrator may be stronger.

Brian Stableford attempts to narrowly define the genre, excluding portal fantasy and fantasy "in which the magical entity is a blatant anomaly". He arrives at a definition of fantasy set in the mundane world, often including an "elaborate secret history". He notes that much contemporary fantasy is set in rural settings, but also notes the subgenre of urban fantasy, and that both children's fiction and literary fiction often fall within this genre.

The Encyclopedia of Fantasy similarly suggests that the mundane and fantastic are contrasted within the genre. The Encyclopedia's definition includes "portal fantasy in which transition between the two realms occurs regularly", as well as several other subgenres; it cites Peter S. Beagle's Lila the Werewolf as a classic of the type. It also notes that in many contemporary fantasies, the fantastic "colonizes" the mundane home. Greg Bechtel agrees with the Encyclopedia, saying the sub-genre "explicitly depicts the collision of the contemporary world with a world of magic and spirits". He notes the distinction between this genre and magical realism, crediting Greer Watson, but says that there can be overlap.

Grzegorz Trebicki describes "contemporary" fantasy works "set in our 'primary' world, in which the textual reality has been enriched by various fantastical elements, usually borrowed from particular mythologies or folk traditions". He says that such works are usually driven by genre conventions other than mythical archetypes.

The term has also been equated with "Paranormal Fantasy", due to the frequency of "paranormal characters (werewolves, vampires, wizards, fairies, etc.)"

=== A broad definition ===
Camille Bacon-Smith uses the term to describe fantasy stories set in the time they were written, and provides H.P. Lovecraft and Fritz Leiber's novel Conjure Wife as examples. She states that "contemporary fantasy belongs to the Gothic tradition of Bram Stoker's Dracula and Poe's 'The Fall of the House of Usher'", noting also that "contemporary fantasy has been a part of the genre since its beginning". She notes that the genre was less popular by the 1960s, considering it supplanted by New Wave and Celtic Twilight books. Bacon-Smith credits Terri Windling's 1986 introduction of Borderland as a key event in improving interest in the genre, also noting the earlier influence of Anne Rice's Interview With The Vampire which she says has a "contemporary background".

== Style ==
In his preface to That Hideous Strength, one of the earlier works falling within this subgenre, C. S. Lewis explained why, when writing a tale about "magicians, devils, pantomime animals and planetary angels", he chose to start it with a detailed depiction of narrow-minded academic politics at a provincial English university and the schemes of crooked real estate developers:

I am following the traditional fairy-tale. We do not always notice its method, because the cottages, castles, woodcutters and petty kings with which a fairy tale opens have become for us as remote as the witches and ogres to which it proceeds. But they were not remote at all to the men who first made and enjoyed the tales.

The same is true for many later works in the genre, which often begin with a seemingly normal scene of modern daily life to then disclose supernatural and magical beings and events hidden behind the scenes.

In an analysis of religion in modern fantasy, Sylvia Kelso notes a "market shift" from high fantasy toward contemporary fantasy, also explaining that "paranormal" subgenres have branched from contemporary fantasy, especially ones centered on vampires and werewolves. Kelso notes that contemporary fantasy is more willing to draw on religious themes than high fantasy. This has been influenced by its openness to vampires and other traditionally evil supernatural beings, which encourages writers to use Christianity to create villains such as demons. However, other books and series draw on other religions and traditions.

== Relationship with other subgenres ==
Novels in which modern characters travel into other worlds, and all the magical action takes place there (except for the portal required to transport them), are not considered contemporary fantasy. Also, contemporary fantasy is generally distinguished from horror fiction that mixes contemporary settings and fantastic elements by the overall tone, emphasizing joy or wonder rather than fear or dread.

The contemporary fantasy and low fantasy genres can overlap as both are set in the real world. There are differences, however. Low fantasies are set in the real world but not necessarily in the modern age, in which case they would not be contemporary fantasy.

There is a considerable overlap between contemporary fantasy and urban fantasy.

== Examples ==
Examples are grouped by author, ordered by initial publication year in the genre.

- The occult thrillers of Charles Williams, 1930–1945
- That Hideous Strength by C. S. Lewis, 1945
- Lila the Werewolf by Peter S. Beagle, 1969
- The novels of Tom Robbins, 1971–2009
- Little, Big by John Crowley, 1981
- Living in Ether by Patricia Geary, 1982
- Moonheart, 1984, and The Onion Girl, 2001, and the rest of the Newford series by Charles de Lint, 1990–2009
- Talking Man by Terry Bisson, 1986
- War for the Oaks by Emma Bull, 1987
- The short fiction of Lucius Shepard
- Neverwhere, 1996, and the graphic novels of Neil Gaiman
- The Hex Witch of Seldom by Nancy Springer, 1988
- Dangerous Angels by Francesca Lia Block, 1989
- The Thread That Binds the Bones by Nina Kiriki Hoffman, 1993
- Waking the Moon by Elizabeth Hand, 1994
- The Wood Wife by Terri Windling, 1996
- The Seventh Heart by Marina Fitch, 1997
- The Harry Potter series by J.K. Rowling, 1997–2007
- King Rat by China Miéville, 1998
- Dark Cities Underground by Lisa Goldstein, 1999
- The Dragons of the Cuyahoga by S. Andrew Swann, 2001
- Tithe: A Modern Faerie Tale by Holly Black, 2002
- Summerland by Michael Chabon, 2002
- The Summer Country by James A. Hetley, 2002
- Hannah's Garden by Midori Snyder, 2004
- The Magicians and its sequels by Lev Grossman, 2009–2014
- The Book of Heroes by Miyuki Miyabe, 2009

== See also ==
- List of genres
- Supernatural fiction

== Sources ==
- Martin Horstkotte, The postmodern fantastic in contemporary British fiction. WVT, Trier 2004, ISBN 3-88476-679-1
- Lance Olsen, Ellipse of uncertainty : an introduction to postmodern fantasy. Greenwood Press, Westport 1987, ISBN 0-313-25511-3
