= Brian Froud =

English fantasy illustrator (born 1947)

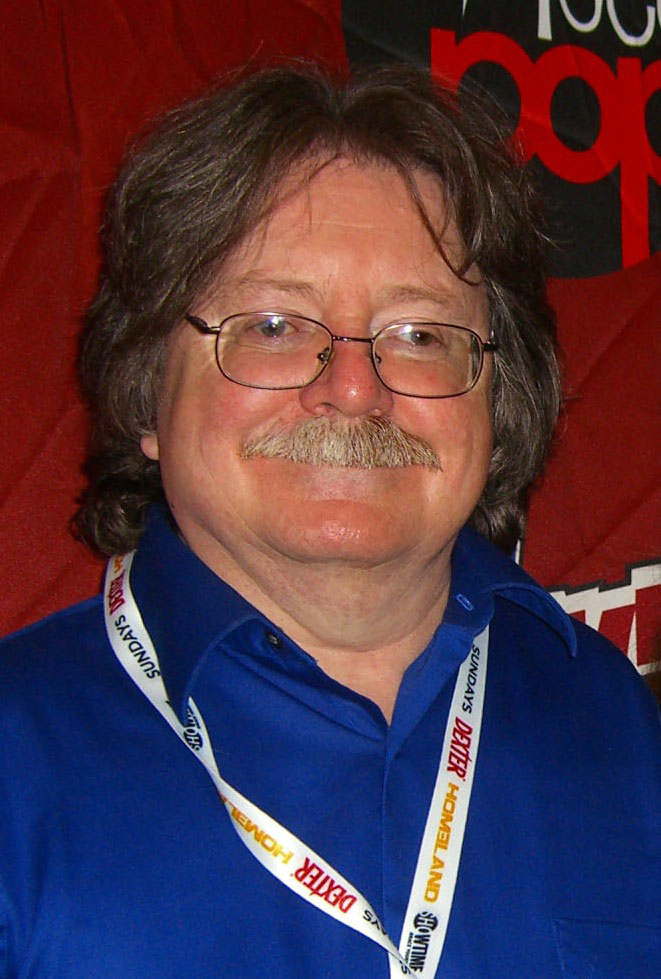
- Froud at the 2012 New York Comic Con
- Born: 1947 (age 78–79); Winchester, Hampshire, England
- Education: Maidstone College of Art
- Known for: Illustration, painting, and conceptual design.
- Spouse: Wendy Froud (m. 1980)
- Children: Toby Froud
- Awards: Hugo Award (1995); Chesley Award (1995, 1999); Inkpot Award (2001); Concept Art Award (2020)

Brian Froud (born 1947) is an English fantasy illustrator and conceptual designer. He is most widely known for his 1978 book Faeries with Alan Lee, and as the conceptual designer of the Jim Henson films The Dark Crystal (1982) and Labyrinth (1986). His Son Toby Froud, also starred as the 18 month old baby in Labyrinth (1986). According to Wired, Froud is "one of the most pre-emiminent visualizers of the world of faerie and folktale".

Most recently, Froud developed the 2019 streaming television series The Dark Crystal: Age of Resistance.

== Early life ==
Froud was born in Winchester, England in 1947. An only child, he grew up in rural Hampshire before moving to Kent. In 1967 he enrolled as a painter at Maidstone College of Art, where he graduated with a first class honors diploma in Graphic Design in 1971.

== Career ==
After graduating, Froud spent five years working as a commercial illustrator in Soho, London before moving to Chagford, Devon in 1975. Between 1972 and 1976, he illustrated four books by children's author Margaret Mahy and Are All the Giants Dead? by Mary Norton. In 1976, Froud was featured in Once Upon a Time: Some Contemporary Illustrators of Fantasy, a survey of modern British illustrators. In 1977, an anthology of his artwork, The Land of Froud, was published.

In collaboration with his friend and fellow artist Alan Lee, Froud created the 1978 book Faeries, an illustrated compendium of faerie folklore. Faeries reached number four on the New York Times Best Sellers list, and by 2003 had sold over five million copies.

Froud's artwork in Once Upon a Time and The Land of Froud brought him to the attention of Jim Henson, who sought out Froud to collaborate on his all-puppetry film The Dark Crystal. Froud served as the conceptual designer of The Dark Crystal, released in 1982. The same year, his concept art for the film was published in the companion book The World of the Dark Crystal. Froud was also the conceptual designer for Henson's next feature film, Labyrinth, released in 1986, as well as for the pilot episode of Henson's television series The Storyteller, first aired in 1987. Following his collaborations with Henson, Froud's filmography continued; as a designer for the 1989 Japanese-American animated film Little Nemo: Adventures in Slumberland; as a visual consultant on the 2000 American animated film The Life & Adventures of Santa Claus and P. J. Hogan's 2003 live-action film Peter Pan; and as a concept artist on the 2016 Disney film Pete's Dragon. Froud returned to working with the Jim Henson Company as the primary conceptual designer of the 2019 Netflix series The Dark Crystal: Age of Resistance, a prequel to The Dark Crystal.

In the late 1980s, Froud formed an artistic-literary partnership with Terry Jones, who was a screenwriter on Labyrinth. Together they produced The Goblins of Labyrinth (1986), a companion book containing Froud's concept art for the film, and subsequently a number of non-Labyrinth-related books about fairies and goblins. Their Lady Cottington series parodied the Cottingley Fairies phenomenon. For his artwork in the first book of the series, Lady Cottington's Pressed Fairy Book (1994), Froud won the Hugo Award for Best Original Artwork and the Chesley Award for Best Interior Illustration.

In 1991, Froud created over 50 paintings and drawings for his Faerielands series, a collaborative project in which he invited four fantasy authors — Charles de Lint, Patricia A. McKillip, Terri Windling and Midori Snyder — to choose their favourite of his pieces and write stories to go with them, based on the premise that "Faerie, inextricably bound as it is to nature and natural forces, is gravely threatened by the ecological crises that human beings have brought to our world". The resulting novels were to be published by Bantam Books. However, only de Lint's The Wild Wood and McKillip's Something Rich and Strange were published in 1994 under the banner "Brian Froud's Faerielands" before the project was cancelled.

His artwork has been exhibited in the United Kingdom and the United States. By 2003, Froud had sold over eight million large-format books of his paintings of fairies.

== Personal life ==
Froud is married to Wendy Froud (née Midener), a puppet-maker and sculptor whom he met at Jim Henson Studios in 1978 while working on The Dark Crystal. The couple married on 31 May 1980, in Chagford. Their son Toby (born 1984) portrayed the infant of the same name in Labyrinth at the age of one, and later became a puppeteer and creature fabricator, working alongside his parents on The Dark Crystal: Age of Resistance as design supervisor. Through his son, Froud has one grandson.

== Artistic style and influences ==
Froud's artwork frequently draws upon fairy tales and European folklore. His paintings of fairies are known for recontexualising Victorian and Edwardian-era beliefs about fairies and were part of a revival of fairy painting seen during the late 20th century.

Among Froud's major influences are the 19th and early 20th-century illustrators Arthur Rackham, Edmund Dulac, and Richard Dadd. Froud cites the early influence of Rackham, "in particular, [Rackham's] drawings of trees that had faces", as sparking his interest in illustrating fairy tales, and describes having had a love of nature from childhood that has informed his style. He is frequently inspired by the landscape of Dartmoor. Other influences Froud cites include the Robinson brothers (Thomas, Charles and William), the Pre-Raphaelites, William Morris and Northern European art from the 1500s and 1600s. He has stated that he was fascinated by Greek, Druid, Celtic and German 15th-century history and mythology. Froud's work has also been influenced by Arthurian legend, "com[ing] from Glastonbury as a sacred centre". Jeremiah Horrigan of the Poughkeepsie Journal wrote that Froud's style "echoes not only the great 19th century illustrators he reveres, but also harbors a wealth of elements ranging from Medieval to ancient Celtic and Nordic folk art."

== Works ==
=== Illustration works ===
- Romeo and Juliet (1971)
- The Man Whose Mother Was a Pirate (1972)
- A Midsummer Night's Dream (1972)
- Day of the Minotaur (1975) — Front cover
- Ultra-violet catastrophe!, or The unexpected walk with Great-Uncle Magnus Pringle (1975)
- Are All the Giants Dead? (1975)
- The Wind Between the Stars (1976)
- The Land of Froud (1977)
- Master Snickup's Cloak (1978)
- Faeries (1978) — With Alan Lee
- The World of the Dark Crystal (1982)
- Goblins: Pop-up Book (1983)
- The Goblins of Labyrinth (1986) (reissued in abridged form as The Goblin Companion: A Field Guide to Goblins (1986)
- The Dreaming Place (1990)
- Lady Cottington's Pressed Fairy Book (1994)
- Quentin Cottington's Journal of Faery Research: Strange Stains and Mysterious Smells (1996)
- Lady Cottington’s Pressed Fairy Journal (1998)
- Good Faeries/Bad Faeries (1998)
- The Faeries' Oracle (2000)
- Lady Cottington’s Fairy Album (2002)
- The Runes of Elfland (2003)
- Goblins! (2004)
- The Secret Sketchbooks of Brian Froud (2005)
- Chelsea Morning (2005) - Based on the song by Joni Mitchell
- Brian Froud's World of Faerie (2007)
- Heart of Faerie Oracle (2010)
- How to See Faeries (2011) — With John Matthews
- Trolls (2012) — With Wendy Froud
- Faeries' Tales (2014)

=== Brian Froud's Faerielands series ===
- Something Rich and Strange (1994) by Patricia A. McKillip
- The Wild Wood (1994) by Charles de Lint
- The Wood Wife (1996) by Terri Windling
- Hannah's Garden (2002) by Midori Snyder

=== Conceptual works ===
- Faeries (1981)
- The Dark Crystal (1982)
- Labyrinth (1986)
- The Storyteller (1987) — pilot episode "Hans My Hedgehog"
- Little Nemo: Adventures in Slumberland (1989)
- The Life & Adventures of Santa Claus (2000)
- Peter Pan (2003)
- Mythic Journeys (2009)
- Pete's Dragon (2016)
- The Dark Crystal: Age of Resistance (2019)

== Awards and nominations ==
=== Illustration ===
In 1979, Froud was nominated for the British Fantasy Award for Best Artwork for Plate 12 of his 1977 book, The Land of Froud. For his 1978 book with Alan Lee, Faeries, Froud won second place in the 1979 Locus Award for Best Art Book (Froud has been a runner up four times through to 2015). Faeries was also nominated for the 1979 Balrog Award for Best Professional Publication. The same year, Froud was also runner up for the Locus Award for Best Artist (he has been a runner up four times through to 1999).

Four years later, Froud was a nominee at the 1983 Hugo Awards in the category of Best Non-Fiction Book for The World of the Dark Crystal, for which Froud was the illustrator in a partnership with writer J. J. Llewellyn. The World of the Dark Crystal won fifth place in the 1983 Locus Award for Best Nonfiction/Reference Book. The same year, Froud was also nominated for the Balrog Award for Best Artist.

Froud was honoured by the World Fantasy Convention with a nomination for the World Fantasy Award for Best Artist in 1991, and again four years later.

In 1995, Froud won the Hugo Award for Best Original Artwork for his illustrations in Lady Cottington's Pressed Fairy Book, a collaboration with writer Terry Jones. The book also won the Chesley Award for Best Interior Illustration, and Froud was also nominated that year for the Chesley Award for Artistic Achievement. For The Wise Woman, Froud won a certificate in the 1995 Spectrum Award for Best Book.

For his illustrations in Terry Windling's novel, The Wood Wife, Froud was nominated for the BSFA Award for Best Artwork in 1998. The following year, for his artwork in Good Faeries/Bad Faeries, another collaboration with Windling, Froud won his second Chesley Award for Best Interior Illustration (he has been a finalist six times through to 2008).

In 2001, Froud, along with his wife, was awarded the Inkpot Award. Froud received a lifetime achievement award from the New York Society of Illustrators Museum in 2011.

=== Film ===
Year	Award	Category	Work(s)	Result
1987	BAFTA Film Award	Best Special Visual Effects	Labyrinth – with Roy Field, George Gibbs and Tony Dunsterville	Nominated
1987	Saturn Award	Best Costume Design	Labyrinth – with Ellis Flyte	Nominated
2020	Concept Art Award	Lifetime Achievement	The Dark Crystal, Labyrinth	Won
