= Midori Snyder =

American poet

- Education: University of Wisconsin–Madison; University of Wisconsin–Milwaukee (MA)
- Occupation: Author
- Writing career
- Period: 1986–present
- Genres: fantasy, mythic fiction, and nonfiction on myth and folklore
- Notable work: The Innamorati
- Website: midorisnyder.com

Midori Snyder is an American writer of fantasy, mythic fiction, and nonfiction on myth and folklore. She has published eight novels for children and adults, winning the Mythopoeic Award for The Innamorati. Her work has been translated into French, Dutch, Italian and Turkish.

== Biography ==
Midori Snyder was born in Santa Monica, California, on January 1, 1954. Raised in the United States and Africa, Snyder is the daughter of the French poet and professor of African Languages and Literature Emile Snyder, and Tibetan scholar, Jeanette Snyder. She is also the granddaughter of Santa Fe artist Pierre Ménager. On June 16, 1979, she wed educator Stephen Haessler; they had two children, Carl and Taiko. She studied African Languages and Literature at the University of Wisconsin–Madison, specializing in African oral narrative traditions. She moved to Milwaukee and later resumed her studies at the University of Wisconsin-Milwaukee, subsequently receiving an M.A. in English Literature and Literary Theory. She then spent some time teaching at Marquette University High School before moving to Arizona.

== Career ==
Snyder's first published work of fiction was "Demon," in the anthology, Bordertown (Signet / New American Library, 1986). Her first novel, Soulstring (Ace Books, 1987), was a fairytale fantasy loosely inspired by the Scottish legend of Tam Lin. This was followed by an imaginary world trilogy: New Moon, Sadar's Keep, and Beldan's Fire (published as adult fantasy by Tor Books, 1989–1993, where it was called The Queens' Quarter Series; reprinted as young adult fantasy by Firebird/Puffin, 2005, re-titled The Oran Trilogy). The Flight of Michael McBride (Tor Books, 1994) was a work of mythic fiction set in the old American West, drawing upon Irish-American, Mexican, and indigenous folklore. Hatchling (Random House, 1995) was a children's book set in the world of Dinotopia. Snyder's award-winning novel The Innamorati (Tor Books, 1998) was inspired by Italian and early Roman legends and the theater of the Commedia dell'Arte. Hannah's Garden (Firebird/Puffin, 2004) is a contemporary fantasy for young adult readers about fairies, folk music, and family dynamics, set in rural Wisconsin. With Jane Yolen, Snyder co-authored the novel Except the Queen (Roc/Penguin, 2010), a contemporary urban fantasy featuring two fey who are banished to the World as elderly women, where they find themselves embroiled in a much larger struggle for power.

Snyder's short fiction and poetry has been published in a number of anthologies including The Year's Best Fantasy and Horror, The Armless Maiden (for which she wrote the title story), The Fair Folk, The Green Man, The Coyote Road, Black Thorn White Rose, Swan Sister, and The Borderland Series. Her essays have appeared in Realms of Fantasy and other magazines, and in Mirror, Mirror on the Wall: Women Writers Explore Their Favorite Fairy Tales--Expanded Edition (Random House, 2002).

Snyder was the co-director (with Terri Windling) of The Endicott Studi, a nonprofit arts and literature organization founded in 1987, and co-editor of The Journal of Mythic Arts, founded in 1997. She served as the 2007 jury chair for the James Tiptree, Jr. Award. Snyder lives in Tucson, Arizona.

== Bibliography ==
- Except the Queen (2010), written by Jane Yolen and Midori Snyder
