= Charles de Lint =

Canadian fantasy author (born 1951)

- Born: December 22, 1951 (age 74); Bussum, Netherlands
- Occupation: Author
- Spouse: MaryAnn Harris (m. 1980; d. 2024)
- Writing career
- Pen name: Samuel M. Key
- Period: 1983–present
- Genres: Fantasy, horror, mythic fiction, magical realism, urban fantasy
- Website: charlesdelint.com

Charles de Lint (born December 22, 1951) is a Canadian writer.

Primarily a writer of fantasy fiction, he has composed works of urban fantasy, contemporary magical realism, and mythic fiction. Along with authors like Terri Windling, Emma Bull, and John Crowley, de Lint during the 1980s pioneered and popularized the subgenre of urban fantasy. He writes novels, novellas, short stories, poetry, and lyrics. His most famous works include: the Newford series of books (Dreams Underfoot, Widdershins, The Blue Girl, The Onion Girl, Moonlight and Vines, Someplace to be Flying, etc.), as well as Moonheart, The Mystery of Grace, The Painted Boy and A Circle of Cats (children's book illustrated by Charles Vess). His distinctive style of fantasy uses American folklore and European folklore; de Lint was influenced by many authors of mythology, folklore, and science fiction, including J. R. R. Tolkien, Lord Dunsany, William Morris, Mervyn Peake, James Branch Cabell, and E. R. Eddison. Some of his mythic fiction poetry can be found online on the Endicott Studio website.

As an essayist/critic/folklorist he writes book reviews for The Magazine of Fantasy & Science Fiction, has judged several literary awards, and has been a writer-in-residence for two public libraries.

== Personal life ==
Charles de Lint was born in 1951 in Bussum, in North Holland in the Netherlands. His family emigrated to Canada when he was four months old. He grew up in Canada, as well as overseas, but has lived in Ottawa since he was age eleven.

In 1974, he met MaryAnn Harris, and they married in 1980. They lived in Ottawa. Harris was first editor of de Lint's fiction and also his business manager.

MaryAnn Harris was hospitalized on September 6, 2021 for Powassan virus, a rare and debilitating tick-borne disease. On his author Facebook page, de Lint announced that MaryAnn passed away as a result of the disease on June 3, 2024. Her obituary noted that she had been de Lint's inspiration, co-musician, first editor, business manager, and artist for many of his published works. The Bruyère Foundation was suggested for memorial donations made in her name as well as to other causes that were important to her, including groups devoted to aiding youth, Indigenous peoples, animal shelters, and the environment.

== Career ==
During his late twenties to early thirties, de Lint worked in a record store and played with a Celtic musical band during weekends.

=== Writing ===
Charles de Lint started writing in 1983 and has been a full-time writer ever since, publishing about forty books between 1984 and 1997, and 71 books (excluding foreign editions and reprints), in total, thus gaining a reputation as a master of fantasy.

Charles de Lint was one of the contributors to the 1984 Citybook II: Port O' Call role-playing game supplement from Flying Buffalo.

He published three horror novels using the pseudonym Samuel M. Key which have subsequently been reprinted by Orb Books as by Charles de Lint. He has also published a children's book, A Circle of Cats, illustrated by artist Charles Vess.

==== Style and settings ====
His main genre, that of contemporary fantasy, which combines the real world with the "otherworld", allows the co-existence of the natural and the supernatural. This has been termed a metaphor for the lack of indigenous folklore in most of Canada living side-by-side with the living oral traditions of the Native Americans. De Lint, however, draws upon not only North American Aboriginal culture, but also the folklore of other cultures. For example, his novel, Moonheart, uses elements of both Native American and Welsh folklore.

Many of his early books are set in Ottawa, while others (1990–2009) have been set mainly in his fictional North American city of Newford, inspired by de Lint's favourite aspects of various North American cities. A regular set of characters are used in many different books. More recently, de Lint published an adult novel, The Mystery of Grace (Tor 2009), set in his fictional Southwestern US town, Santa de Vado Viejo, as was his most recent young adult novel, The Painted Boy (Viking 2010).

==== Recognition ====
De Lint has received many awards, including the World Fantasy Award for Life Achievement in 2018. Other awards include the 2000 World Fantasy Award for Best Collection for Moonlight and Vines, the Ontario Library Association's White Pine Award, as well as the Great Lakes Great Books Award for his young adult novel The Blue Girl (Viking, 2004). In 1988, he won the Canadian SF/Fantasy Award, the Casper (now known as the Aurora) for his novel Jack, the Giant-killer (Ace 1987). He also received the award for Under My Skin in 2013 and Out of This World in 2015. The Cats of Tanglewood Forest received a Sunburst Award in 2014. His novel Widdershins (Tor, 2006) won first place, Amazon.com Editors' Picks: Top 10 Science Fiction & Fantasy Books of 2006. His 1984 urban fantasy novel, Moonheart, was a best-selling trade paperback for Tor's Orb line and won a Crawford Award. It has been described as a thriller, detective mystery, and otherworld mythic fantasy.

==== Other literary work ====
In addition to being the author of numerous novels and short stories, de Lint is also a poet, folklorist, and critic. His poetry can be found online in the Endicott Studio Journal of Mythic Arts. He has taught creative writing workshops in Canada and the United States, and was writer‑in‑residence for two public libraries in Ottawa. He has also written original songs; his main instruments are flute, fiddle, whistles, vocals and guitar. In 2011, de Lint released his first CD, Old Blue Truck De Lint has also been a judge for the Nebula Award, the World Fantasy Award, the Theodore Sturgeon Award and the Bram Stoker Award.

=== Music and art ===
De Lint plays folk, Irish and Celtic music with his wife MaryAnn; at one time playing at a local pub, and most recently doing concerts at FaerieWorlds and FaerieCon West in Seattle. He plays multiple instruments and sings and writes his own songs. In 2011 de Lint released his first album, Old Blue Truck, which was released alongside his wife MaryAnn Harris's album, Crow Girls in which he also contributes.

== Awards ==
Work	Year & Award	Category	Result	Ref.
The Fane of the Grey Rose	1980 Balrog Awards	Short Fiction	Nominated	
Dragonfields	1981 World Fantasy Special Award—Non-professional		Nominated	
Dragonfields	1981 Balrog Awards	Amatur Achievement	Nominated	
A Patten of Silver Strings	1983 Balrog Awards	Short Fiction	Nominated	
The Riddle of the Wren	1985 Locus Award	First Novel	Nominated	
Moonheart	1985 Locus Award	Fantasy Novel	Nominated	
Moonheart	1985 Mythopoeic Awards	Fantasy	Nominated	
Moonheart	1985 Crawford Award		Won	
Mulengro	1986 Locus Award	Fantasy Novel	Nominated	
Mulengro	1986 Aurora Awards	Novel	Nominated	
Yarrow	1987 Locus Award	Fantasy Novel	Nominated	
Yarrow	1987 Aurora Awards	Novel	Nominated	
Uncle Dobbin's Parrot Fair	1988 Locus Award	Novelette	Nominated	
Jack, the Giant Killer	1988 Aurora Awards	Novel	Won	
Greenmantle	1989 Locus Award	Fantasy Novel	Nominated	
The Drowned Man's Reef'	1989 Readercon Awards	Short Work	Won	
Ghostwood	1991 Locus Award	Fantasy Novel	Nominated	
Drink Down the Moon	1991 Locus Award	Fantasy Novel	Nominated	
The Fair in Emain Matcha	1991 Aurora Awards	Short Fiction	Nominated	
Freewheeling	1991 Aurora Awards	Short Fiction	Nominated	
Death Leaves an Echo	1991 Bram Stoker Award	Long Fiction	Nominated	
The Little Country	1991 HOMer Award	Fantasy Novel	Won	
The Little Country	1992 Locus Award	Fantasy Novel	Nominated	
The Little Country	1992 Aurora Awards	Novel	Nominated	
The Little Country	1992 World Fantasy Award	Novel	Nominated	
The Little Country	1994 Mythopoeic Awards	Fantasy	Nominated	
The Little Country	1994 Premio Ignotus	Foreign Novel	Nominated	
Our Lady of the Harbour	1992 Locus Award	Novella	Nominated	
Our Lady of the Harbour	1992 World Fantasy Award	Novella	Nominated	
Raven Sings a Medicine Way, Coyote Steals the Pollen	1992 Aurora Awards	Short Fiction	Nominated	
The Conjure Man	1992 World Fantasy Award	Short Fiction	Nominated	
Pity the Monsters	1992 World Fantasy Award	Short Fiction	Nominated	
Bridges	1993 World Fantasy Award	Short Fiction	Nominated	
Spiritwalk	1993 World Fantasy Award	Collection	Nominated	
Paperjack	1993 World Fantasy Award	Novella	Nominated	
The Bone Woman	1994 Locus Award	Short Story	Nominated	
Dreams Underfoot	1994 Locus Award	Collection	Nominated	
Dreams Underfoot	1994 World Fantasy Award	Collection	Nominated	
The Moon is Drowning While I Sleep	1994 World Fantasy Award	Short Fiction	Nominated	
Memory & Dream	1995 Locus Award	Fantasy Novel	Nominated	
The Ivory and the Horn	1996 Locus Award	Collection	Nominated	
The Ivory and the Horn	1996 World Fantasy Award	Collection	Nominated	
Timeskip	1997 Grand Prix de l'Imaginaire	Foreign Short story/Collection of Foreign Short Stories	Nominated	
Trader	1998 Locus Award	Fantasy Novel	Nominated	
Trader	1998 World Fantasy Award	Novel	Nominated	
Trader	1998 Mythopoeic Awards	Adult Literature	Nominated	
Trader	1998 Aurora Awards	Novel	Nominated	
Someplace to be Flying	1999 Locus Award	Fantasy Novel	Nominated	
Someplace to be Flying	1999 British Fantasy Award	August Derleth Award	Nominated	
Someplace to be Flying	1999 Aurora Awards	Novel	Nominated	
Someplace to be Flying	1999 World Fantasy Award	Novel	Nominated	
Someplace to be Flying	1999 Mythopoeic Awards	Adult Literature	Nominated	
China Doll	1999 British Fantasy Award	Short Fiction	Nominated	
Moonlight and Vines	2000 World Fantasy Award	Collection	Won	
Moonlight and Vines	2000 Locus Award	Collection	Nominated	
Moonlight and Vines	2000 British Fantasy Award	Collection	Nominated	
Triskell Tales	2001 Locus Award	Collection	Nominated	
Forests of the Heart	2001 Locus Award	Fantasy Novel	Nominated	
Forests of the Heart	2001 Nebula Award	Novel	Nominated	
Forests of the Heart	2001 Mythopoeic Awards	Adult Literature	Nominated	
The Onion Girl	2002 Locus Award	Fantasy Novel	Nominated	
The Onion Girl	2002 World Fantasy Award	Novel	Nominated	
The Onion Girl	2017 Aurora Awards	Best of the Decade	Nominated	
Books to Look For	2002 Aurora Awards	Related Work	Nominated	
Waifs and Strays	2003 Locus Award	Collection	Nominated	
Waifs and Strays	2003 World Fantasy Award	Collection	Nominated	
Seven Wild Sisters	2003 Locus Award	Novella	Nominated	
Seven Wild Sisters	2003 World Fantasy Award	Novella	Nominated	
Circle of Cats	2004 World Fantasy Award	Short Fiction	Nominated	
The Blue Girl	2005 Locus Award	Young Adult Book	Nominated	
The Blue Girl	2006 White Pine Award	Fiction	Won	
Dingo	2009 Sunburst Award	Young Adult	Nominated	
The Mystery of Grace	2010 Sunburst Award	Adult Book	Nominated	
The Painted Boy	2011 Sunburst Award	Young Adult	Nominated	
Under My Skin	2013 Aurora Awards	YA Novel	Won	
The Cats of Tanglewood Forest	2014 Sunburst Award	Young Adult	Won	
Out of This World	2015 Aurora Awards	YA Novel	Won	
Newford series	2018 World Fantasy Award	Lifetime Achievement	Won	

== Bibliography ==
=== Novels ===
- The Riddle of the Wren. New York: Ace Books. 1984.
- Moonheart: A Romance. New York: Ace Books. 1984.
- The Harp of the Grey Rose. Norfolk, Va.: Donning. 1985.
- Mulengro: A Romany Tale. 1985.
- Yarrow. 1986.
- Jack, the Giant-Killer. 1987.
- Greenmantle. 1988.
- Wolf Moon. 1988.
- Svaha. 1989.
- The Valley of Thunder. Philip José Farmer's Dungeon series #3. 1989.
- The Hidden City. Philip José Farmer's Dungeon series #5. 1990.
- Ghostwood. 1990.
- Drink Down the Moon. 1990.
- Angel of Darkness. 1990.
- The Little Country. 1991.
- Into the Green. 1993.
- The Wild Wood (Brian Froud's Faerielands, Illustrated by Brian Froud) (1994)
- Memory and Dream (1994)
- Someplace to Be Flying (1998)
- The Road to Lisdoonvarna (2001)
- The Blue Girl (2004)
- The Mystery of Grace (2009)
- Eyes Like Leaves (2009)
- Under My Skin (2012)
- Over My Head (2013)
- Out of This World (2014)
- The Wind in His Heart (2017)
- Juniper Wiles (2021)
- Juniper Wiles and the Ghost Girls (2022)
- Juniper Wiles Does Not Want to Be Queen (2025)

=== Young adult novels ===
Some additional young adult novels are listed under their series name below.

- Little (Grrl) Lost (2007)
- The Painted Boy (2010)
- The Cats of Tanglewood Forest (illustrated by Charles Vess) (2013)
- Seven Wild Sisters: A Modern Fairy Tale (illustrated by Charles Vess) (2002)

=== Novellas ===
- Berlin (1989)
- The Fair in Emain Macha (1990)
- Our Lady of the Harbour (1991)
- Paperjack (1992)
- Death Leaves an Echo (part of three novella collection, Cafe Purgatoriam) (1991)
- A Circle of Cats (illustrated by Charles Vess) (2003)
- Promises to Keep (2007, Tachyon Publications)
- A Tangle of Green Men (2011)

=== Chapbooks ===
- Laughter in the Leaves (1984)
- Ghosts of Wind and Shadow (1991)
- Refinerytown (2003)
- This Moment (2005)
- Make A Joyful Noise (2006)
- Old Man Crow (2007)
- Riding Shotgun (2007)
- Yellow Dog (2008)

=== Short stories published in book form ===
- Ascian in Rose (1987) (re-published in Spiritwalk)
- Westlin Wind (1989) (re-published in Spiritwalk)
- Uncle Dobbin's Parrot Fair (1991) (re-published in Dreams Underfoot)
- Our Lady of the Harbour (1991) (re-published in Dreams Underfoot)
- Paperjack (1991) (re-published in Dreams Underfoot)
- Merlin Dreams in the Mondream Wood (1992) (re-published in Spiritwalk)
- The Wishing Well (1993) (re-published in The Ivory and the Horn)
- The Buffalo Man (1999) (re-published in Tapping the Dream Tree)

=== Collections ===
- A Pattern of Silver Strings (1981)
- De Grijze Roos ("The Grey Rose") (1983) (translated into Flemish)
- In Mask and Motley (1983)
- Desert Moments (1991)
- Hedgework and Guessery (1991)
- Spiritwalk (1992)
- Jack of Kinrowan (1995)
- Triskell Tales (2000)
- Waifs and Strays (2002)
- A Handful of Coppers (2003) (Collected Early Stories, Vol.1: Heroic Fantasy)
- Quicksilver & Shadow (2004) (Collected Early Stories, Vol.2)
- Triskell Tales 2 (2006)
- What the Mouse Found and Other Stories (2008)
- Woods and Waters Wild (2008)
- The Very Best of Charles de Lint (2010)

=== Newford series ===
Newford is a fictional North American city where Charles de Lint has set many of his novels and short stories. Human beings share the city with European and Native American mythological legends, finding common ground as they live out their daily lives or find themselves swept up in adventures.

- The Dreaming Place (young adult, illustrated by Brian Froud) (1990)
- From a Whisper to a Scream (first published under the pseudonym Samuel M. Key) (1992)
- I'll Be Watching You (first published under the pseudonym Samuel M. Key) (1994)
- Memory and Dream (1994)
- Trader (1997)
- Someplace to Be Flying (1998)
- Forests of the Heart (2000)
- The Onion Girl (2001)
- Seven Wild Sisters (Novella illustrated by Charles Vess) (2002)
- Spirits in the Wires (2003)
- A Circle of Cats (2003) (written as a children's book)
- Medicine Road (illustrated by Charles Vess, Tachyon Publications) (2004)
- The Blue Girl (young adult) (2004)
- Widdershins (2006)
- Promises to Keep (2007, Tachyon Publications)
- Old Man Crow (2007)
- Dingo (young adult) (2008)
- Juniper Wiles (2021)
- Juniper Wiles and the Ghost Girls (2022)
- Juniper Wiles Does Not Want to Be Queen (2025)

Newford Series Collections

- Dreams Underfoot (1993)
- The Ivory and the Horn (1995)
- Moonlight and Vines (1999)
- The Newford Stories (compiles Dreams Underfoot, The Ivory and the Horn & Moonlight and Vines) (1999)
- Tapping the Dream Tree (2002)
- The Hour Before Dawn (2005)
- Riding Shotgun (2007)
- Muse and Reverie: A Newford Collection (2009)
- Newford Stories: Crow Girls (2015)
- Newford Stories: The Blue Fiddle (2022)

=== Short stories ===
- "The Valley of the Troll" in Sword and Sorceress I (1984)
- "Cold Blows The Wind" in Sword and Sorceress II (1985)
- "The Weeping Oak" in Sword and Sorceress IV (1987)
- "Into the Green" in Sword and Sorceress V (1988)
- "One Chance" in Werewolves (edited by Jane Yolen and Martin H. Greenberg). Reprinted in Bruce Coville's Book of Spine Tinglers (1988)
- "Conjure Man" in After the King: Stories In Honor of J.R.R. Tolkien (1991)
- "Somewhere in My Mind There is a Painting Box" in The Green Man: Tales from the Mythic Forest (2002)
- "Companions to the Moon" in Realms of Fantasy (June, 2007). Reprinted in Peter S. Beagle's The Urban Fantasy (2011)
- "Ten for the Devil" in Battle Magic (Daw Books). Reprinted in Tim Pratt's Sympathy for the Devil (2010)
- "The Butter Spirit's Tithe (2004) in Emerald Magic

De Lint also scripted several comic books for Barry Blair's Aircel Publishing in the mid-1980s.

His short story, "The Sacred Fire", was made into a short film by Peter Billingsley and Robert Meyer Burnett in 1994. Originally set on and near the campus of Butler University, the setting was changed to Beverly Hills for the film. It was also adapted as an episode of The Hunger in January 2000.

=== Anthology ===
- Cafe Purgatorium (1991) (with Dana. M. Anderson & Ray Garton)

=== Review columns ===
- De Lint writes a regular review column called "Books to Look For" for the Magazine of Fantasy and Science Fiction.
- Wrote several reviews in 1978 edition of Beyond the Fields We Know: Tales of Fantasy magazine as well as published poem Far from the Rush.
- Wrote several reviews in Fanzine Dragonfields: Tales of Fantasy #3, Summer 1980 edition.
- Wrote several reviews in Fanzine Dragonfields: Tales of Fantasy #4, Winter 1983 edition.

== Discography ==
- Old Blue Truck (2011)
- Crow Girls (MaryAnn Harris) (2011)
- The Loon's Lament—digital single (2011) (previously released on the album A Walk on the Windy Side in 2002).
