= Terri Windling =

American writer and editor (born 1958)

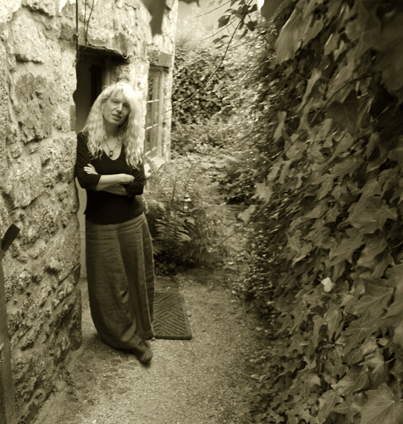
- Photo portrait, 2008
- Born: December 3, 1958 (age 67); Fort Dix, New Jersey, U.S.
- Education: Antioch College
- Occupations: Editor; artist; essayist; author

Terri Windling (born December 3, 1958, in Fort Dix, New Jersey) is an American editor, artist, essayist, and the author of books for both children and adults. She has won nine World Fantasy Awards, the Mythopoeic Fantasy Award, and the Bram Stoker Award, and her collection The Armless Maiden appeared on the short-list for the James Tiptree Jr. Award.

In 2010, Windling received the SFWA Solstice Award, which honors "individuals with a significant impact on the speculative fiction field". Her work has been translated into French, German, Spanish, Italian, Czech, Lithuanian, Turkish, Russian, Japanese, and Korean.

== Early life ==
Terri Windling was born on December 3, 1958, in Fort Dix, New Jersey. She was raised in New Jersey and Pennsylvania. She attended Antioch College, graduating in 1979.

After college, she moved to New York and worked in publishing as an editor and an artist.

== Career ==
=== Writing ===
In the American publishing field, Windling has been one of the primary creative forces behind the mythic fiction resurgence that began in the early 1980s, through her work as an innovative editor for the Ace and Tor Books fantasy lines and as the editor of more than thirty anthologies of magical fiction. She created the Fairy Tale Series of novels that reinterpret classic fairy tales. She is also recognized as one of the founders of urban fantasy, having published and promoted the first novels of Charles de Lint, Emma Bull, and other pioneers of the genre.

With Ellen Datlow, Windling edited 16 volumes of Year's Best Fantasy and Horror (1986–2003), an anthology that reached beyond the boundaries of genre fantasy to incorporate magic realism, surrealism, poetry, and other forms of magical literature. Datlow and Windling also edited the Snow White, Blood Red series of literary fairy tales for adult readers, as well as many anthologies of myth & fairy tale inspired fiction for younger readers, such as The Green Man, The Faery Reel, and The Wolf at the Door. Windling also created and edited the Borderland series for teenage readers, and The Armless Maiden, a fiction collection intended for adult survivors of child abuse like herself.

As an author, Windling's fiction includes The Wood Wife (1996), winner of the Mythopoeic Award for Novel of the Year, and several children's books: The Raven Queen, The Changeling, A Midsummer Night's Faery Tale, The Winter Child, and The Faeries of Spring Cottage. Her essays on myth, folklore, magical literature and art have been widely published in newsstand magazines, academic journals, art books, and anthologies. She was a contributor to The Oxford Companion to Fairy Tales, edited by Jack Zipes.

In May 2016, Windling gave the fourth annual Tolkien Lecture at Pembroke College, Oxford, speaking on the topic of fantasy literature in the post-Tolkien era.

In 2020, she announced the establishment of a publishing company, Bumblehill Press.

=== Art ===
As an artist, Windling specializes in work inspired by myth, folklore, and fairy tales. Her art has been exhibited across the US, as well as in the UK and France.

Windling is the founder of the Endicott Studio, an organization dedicated to myth-inspired arts, and was the co-editor with Midori Snyder of The Journal of Mythic Arts from 1987 until it ceased publication in 2008. She also sits on the board of the Mythic Imagination Institute.

== Personal life ==
In September 2008, Windling married Howard Gayton, a British dramatist and co-founder of the Ophaboom Theatre Company, a Commedia dell'arte troupe. Since the early 1990s she has resided in Devon, England; she divided her time between there and Tucson, Arizona, for many years.

Windling is a close friend and neighbor of artists Wendy and Brian Froud, and has collaborated with them on several projects.

== Works ==
=== Fiction ===
- "The Green Children", The Armless Maiden, Tor Books, 1995
- The Wood Wife, Tor Books, 1996
- "The Color of Angels", The Horns of Elfland, New American Library, 1997
- The Raven Queen, with Ellen Steiber, Random House, 1999
- The Changeling, Random House, 1995
- The Old Oak Wood Series, Simon & Schuster, illustrated by Wendy Froud
  - A Midsummer Night's Faery Tale, 1999
  - The Winter Child, 2000
  - The Faeries of Spring Cottage, 2001
- "Red Rock", Century Magazine, 2000
- The Moon Wife, Tor Books, forthcoming
- Little Owl, Viking, forthcoming

=== Nonfiction ===
- "Surviving Childhood", The Armless Maiden, Tor Books, 1995
- "Transformations", Mirror, Mirror on the Wall: Women Writers Explore Their Favorite Fairy Tales (Expanded Edition), Anchor, 1998
- Co-writer and editor of Brian Froud's Good Faeries/Bad Faeries, Simon & Schuster, 2000
- "On Tolkien and Fairy Stories", Meditations on Middle-Earth, St. Martin's Press, 2001
- Contributing writer to The Oxford Companion to Fairy Tales, edited by Jack Zipes, Oxford University Press, Oxford, 2002
- Contributing writer to Fées, elfes, dragons & autres créatures des royaumes de féerie, edited by Claudine Glot and Michel Le Bris, Hoëbeke, France, 2004
- Contributing writer to Panorama illustré de la fantasy & du merveilleux, edited by André-François Ruaud, Les Moutons Electriques, France 2004
- Numerous articles on myth and mythic arts for Realms of Fantasy magazine and the Journal of Mythic Arts, 1992–2008

=== Anthologies ===
- Elsewhere, Volumes I–III, edited with Mark Alan Arnold, Ace Books, 1981–1983
- Faery, Ace Books, 1985
- The Year's Best Fantasy and Horror series, with Ellen Datlow, 1986–2003 (winner of three World Fantasy Awards and the Bram Stoker Award)
- Snow White, Blood Red series, with Ellen Datlow
  - Snow White, Blood Red, Morrow/Avon, 1993
  - Black Thorn, White Rose, Morrow/Avon, 1994; Prime Books, 2007
  - Ruby Slippers, Golden Tears, Morrow/Avon, 1995; Prime Books 2008
  - Black Swan, White Raven, Avon Books, 1997; Prime Books, 2008
  - Silver Birch, Blood Moon, Avon Books, 1999
  - Black Heart, Ivory Bones, Avon Books, 2000
- Sirens and Other Daemon Lovers, with Ellen Datlow, HarperPrism, 1998; Avon, 2002
- The Armless Maiden and Other Tales for Childhood's Survivors, Tor Books, 1995
- Retold Fairy Tales series, with Ellen Datlow (for Middle Grade readers)
  - A Wolf at the Door and Other Retold Fairy Tales, Simon & Schuster, 2000
  - Swan Sister: Fairy Tales Retold, Simon & Schuster, 2002
  - Troll's Eye View and Other Villainous Tales, Viking, 2009
- Mythic Fiction series, with Ellen Datlow, illustrated by Charles Vess (for Young Adult readers)
  - The Green Man: Tales from the Mythic Forest, Viking, 2002
  - The Faery Reel: Tales From the Twilight Realm, Viking, 2004
  - The Coyote Road: Trickster Tales, Viking, 2007
  - The Beastly Bride: Tales of the Animal People, Viking, 2010
- Salon Fantastique with Ellen Datlow, Thunder's Mouth Press, 2006
- Teeth with Ellen Datlow, HarperCollins, 2011
- After with Ellen Datlow, Disney/Hyperion, forthcoming 2012
- Queen Victoria's Book of Spells with Ellen Datlow, Tor Books, forthcoming 2013

=== Series edited ===
- The Fairy Tale Series, created with artist Thomas Canty, Ace Books and Tor Books, 1986 to present – novels that retell and reinterpret traditional fairy tales; by Steven Brust, Pamela Dean, Charles de Lint, Tanith Lee, Patricia Wrede, Jane Yolen, and others
- Brian Froud's Faerielands, Bantam Books, 1994 – contemporary fantasy novellas by Charles de Lint and Patricia A. McKillip, illustrated by Brian Froud
- Borderland, New American Library, Tor Books, Harper Prism, 1985 to present

The latter Young Adult shared-world series features the intersection of Elfland and human lands, which is generally populated by teenagers, runaways, and exiles. Primary series writers are Ellen Kushner, Charles de Lint, Midori Snyder, Emma Bull, and Will Shetterly. The series consists of five anthologies and three novels to date.

== Awards ==
While many of Windling's literary awards have come from anthologies in partnership with Ellen Datlow, a few have also come from solo literary work.

Awards for the anthology The Year's Best Fantasy (and The Year's Best Fantasy and Horror) annual collections 1-16 (with Ellen Datlow)
Award	Awards Won	Only Nominated
Bram Stoker Award	1	5
British Fantasy Award		3
International Horror Guild Award		1
Locus Award		16
World Fantasy Award	3	8

Work	Year & Award	Category	Result	Ref.
Elsewhere (with Mark Alan Arnold)	1982 World Fantasy Award	Collection	Won	
Elsewhere (with Mark Alan Arnold)	1982 Locus Award	Anthology	Nominated	
Elsewhere (with Mark Alan Arnold)	1982 Balrog Award	Collection/Anthology	Nominated	
Elsewhere, Vol. II (with Mark Alan Arnold)	1983 Balrog Award	Collection/Anthology	Nominated	
Elsewhere, Vol. II (with Mark Alan Arnold)	1983 Locus Award	Anthology	Nominated	
Faery!	1985 Locus Award	Anthology	Nominated	
Faery!	1986 World Fantasy Award	Collection	Nominated	
Elsewhere, Vol. III (with Mark Alan Arnold)	1985 Locus Award	Anthology	Nominated	
Ace Books	1987 World Fantasy Special Award—Professional		Nominated	
Ace Books	1988 World Fantasy Special Award—Professional		Nominated	
Snow White, Blood Red (with Ellen Datlow)	1994 World Fantasy Award	Anthology	Nominated	
Snow White, Blood Red (with Ellen Datlow)	1994 Locus Award	Anthology	Nominated	
Black Thorn, White Rose (with Ellen Datlow)	1995 World Fantasy Award	Anthology	Nominated	
Black Thorn, White Rose (with Ellen Datlow)	1995 Locus Award	Anthology	Nominated	
The Armless Maiden and Other Stories for Childhood's Survivors	1995 Otherwise Award		Honor	
The Armless Maiden and Other Stories for Childhood's Survivors	1996 Locus Award	Anthology	Nominated	
Ruby Slippers, Golden Tears (with Ellen Datlow)	1996 Locus Award	Anthology	Nominated	
The Wood Wife	1997 Mythopoeic Awards	Adult Literature	Won	
The Wood Wife	1997 Locus Award	Fantasy Novel	Nominated	
Black Swan, White Raven (with Ellen Datlow)	1998 Locus Award	Anthology	Nominated	
Sirens and Other Daemon Lovers (with Ellen Datlow)	1998 International Horror Guild Award	Anthology	Nominated	
Sirens and Other Daemon Lovers (with Ellen Datlow)	1999 Locus Award	Anthology	Nominated	
Silver Birch, Blood Moon (with Ellen Datlow)	2000 World Fantasy Award	Anthology	Won	
Silver Birch, Blood Moon (with Ellen Datlow)	2000 Locus Award	Anthology	Nominated	
"The King with Three Daughters" (with Ellen Datlow)	2001 Ditmar Award	Short Fiction	Nominated	
Black Heart, Ivory Bones (with Ellen Datlow)	2001 Locus Award	Anthology	Nominated	
A Wolf at the Door and Other Retold Fairy Tales (with Ellen Datlow)	2001 Locus Award	Anthology	Nominated	
A Wolf at the Door and Other Retold Fairy Tales (with Ellen Datlow)	2002 Utah Beehive Book Award	Young Adult	Nominated	
The Green Man: Tales from the Mythic Forest (with Ellen Datlow)	2003 World Fantasy Award	Anthology	Won	
The Green Man: Tales from the Mythic Forest (with Ellen Datlow)	2003 Locus Award	Anthology	Nominated	
Swan Sister: Fairy Tales Retold (with Ellen Datlow)	2004 Locus Award	Young Adult Book	Nominated	
The Faery Reel: Tales from the Twilight Realm (with Ellen Datlow)	2005 World Fantasy Award	Anthology	Nominated	
The Faery Reel: Tales from the Twilight Realm (with Ellen Datlow)	2005 Locus Award	Young Adult Book	Nominated	
Salon Fantastique (with Ellen Datlow)	2007 World Fantasy Award	Anthology	Won	
Salon Fantastique (with Ellen Datlow)	2007 Locus Award	Anthology	Nominated	
The Coyote Road: Trickster Tales (with Ellen Datlow)	2008 World Fantasy Award	Anthology	Nominated	
The Coyote Road: Trickster Tales (with Ellen Datlow)	2008 Locus Award	Anthology	Nominated	
Endicott Studios Website (with Midori Snyder)	2008 World Fantasy Special Award—Non-professional		Won	
Troll's Eye View: A Book of Villainous Tales (with Ellen Datlow)	2010 Locus Award	Anthology	Nominated	
Troll's Eye View: A Book of Villainous Tales (with Ellen Datlow)	2013 FantLab's Book of the Year Award	Anthology	Nominated	
The Beastly Bride (with Ellen Datlow)	2011 Locus Award	Anthology	Nominated	
Teeth: Vampire Tales (with Ellen Datlow)	2011 Shirley Jackson Award	Anthology	Nominated	
Teeth: Vampire Tales (with Ellen Datlow)	2012 Locus Award	Anthology	Nominated	
After (with Ellen Datlow)	2013 Locus Award	Anthology	Nominated	
Queen Victoria's Book of Spells (with Ellen Datlow)	2013 Shirley Jackson Award	Anthology	Nominated	
Queen Victoria's Book of Spells (with Ellen Datlow)	2014 World Fantasy Award	Anthology	Nominated	
Queen Victoria's Book of Spells (with Ellen Datlow)	2014 Locus Award	Anthology	Nominated	
The Year's Best Fantasy and Horror & other anthologies	2022 World Fantasy Award	Life Achievement	Won	
	2009 Science Fiction and Fantasy Writers Association	Kate Wilhelm Solstice Award	Won	

== See also ==
- Bellamy Bach

== Other sources ==
- Terri Windling at the Internet Book List
- Terri Windling at the Internet Speculative Fiction Database
- "Mythic Fiction for Young Adults" by Julie Bartel, The Journal of Mythic Arts, 2005
- Terri Windling interview in Locus Magazine, October 2003
- Zipes, Jack (2000), The Oxford Companion to Fairy Tales, Oxford: Oxford University Press, ISBN 0-19-860115-8
- de Vos, Gail, and Altmann, Anna E. (1999), New Tales for Old: Folktales as Literary Fictions for Young Adults, CT: Libraries Unlimited/The Greenwood Publishing Group, ISBN 1-56308-447-3
- "Into the Woods: The Faery Worlds of Terri Windling", by Donald G. Keller, Legends Magazine, February 1998
- SFWA.org, SFWA Announces 2010 Solstice Award Honorees, SFWA website, May 2010
