= Michael Cadnum =

American poet and novelist

Michael Cadnum (born 1949) is an American poet and novelist. He has written more than thirty-six books for adults, teens and children. He is best known for his adult suspense fiction, and young adult fiction based on myths, legends, and historical figures.

== Biography ==
He was born in 1949. Cadnum attended both University of California at Berkeley, and San Francisco State University. He earned a National Endowment of the Arts fellowship for his poetry. He currently resides in Albany, California.

== Bibliography ==
=== Novels ===
- Seize the Storm (2012)
- Flash (2010)
- Peril on the Sea (2009)
- The King's Arrow (2008)
- Nightsong: The Legend of Orpheus and Eurydice (2006)
- The Dragon Throne (2005)
- Starfall: Phaeton and the Chariot of the Sun (2004)
- Ship of Fire (2003)
- Daughter of the Wind (2002)
- The Leopard Sword (2002)
- Forbidden Forest: the story of Little John and Robin Hood (2002)
- Raven of the Waves (2001)
- Redhanded (2000)
- The Book of the Lion (2000)
- Blood Gold (2004)
- Rundown (1999)
- Heat (1998)
- In A Dark Wood (1998)
- Edge (1997)
- Zero At The Bone (1996)
- The Judas Glass (1996)
- Taking It (1995)
- Skyscape (1994)
- The Horses of the Night (1993)
- Ghostwright (1993)
- Breaking the Fall (1992)
- Saint Peter's Wolf (1992)
- Sleepwalker (1991)
- Calling Home (1991)
- Nightlight (1990)

=== Short fiction ===
Collections

- Can't Catch Me (2006, Tachyon Publications)
- Earthquake Murder (2018)

Stories

Title	Year	First published	Reprinted/collected	Notes
Elf trap	2001	"Elf trap". F&SF. 100 (4): 125–129. April 2001.		
Ella and the Canary Prince	1999			
Together again	2001			

=== Poetry ===
- The Promised Rain (forthcoming)
- Kingdom (2018)
- This Early Dark (2016)
- "Day by Day" (2003)
- Illicit (chapbook, 2001)
- The Woman Who Discovered Math (chapbook, 2001)
- The Cities We Will Never See (1993)
- By Evening (1992)
- Foreign Springs (chapbook, 1988)
- Invisible Mirror (chapbook, 1987)
- Long Afternoons (1986)
- "Wrecking the Cactus" (pamphlet, 1985)
- The Morning of the Massacre, (chapbook, 1981)

== Translations ==
- Foreign editions of Michael Cadnum's work include Danish, Persian, French, German, Italian, Spanish, among others.
