= Flying ointment =

Hallucinogenic salve used in the practice of witchcraft

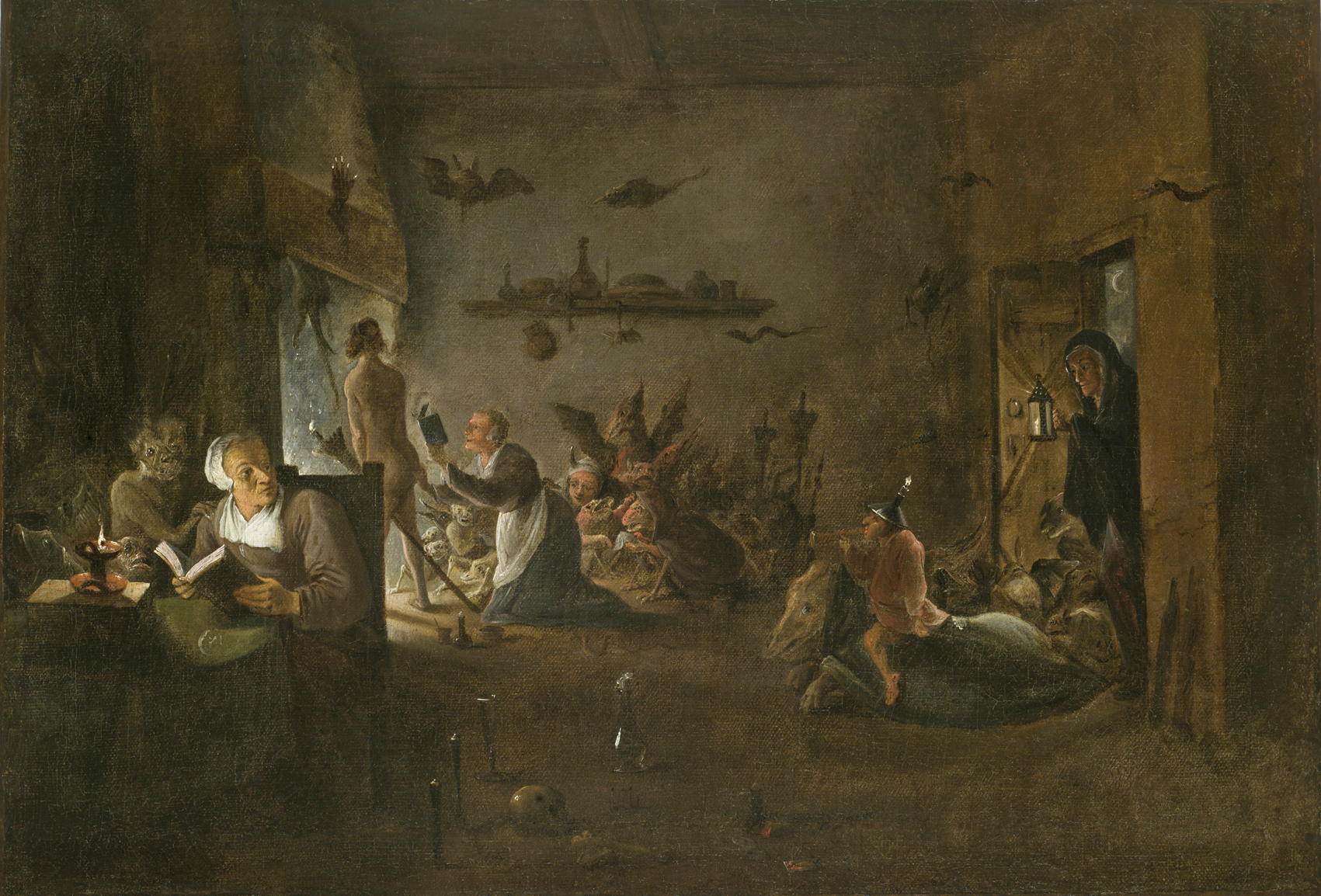
Preparation for the Witches' Sabbath by David Teniers the Younger. Note on the left an older witch reading from a grimoire while anointing the buttocks of a young witch about to fly to the sabbath upon an inverted broom with a candle upon its twigs

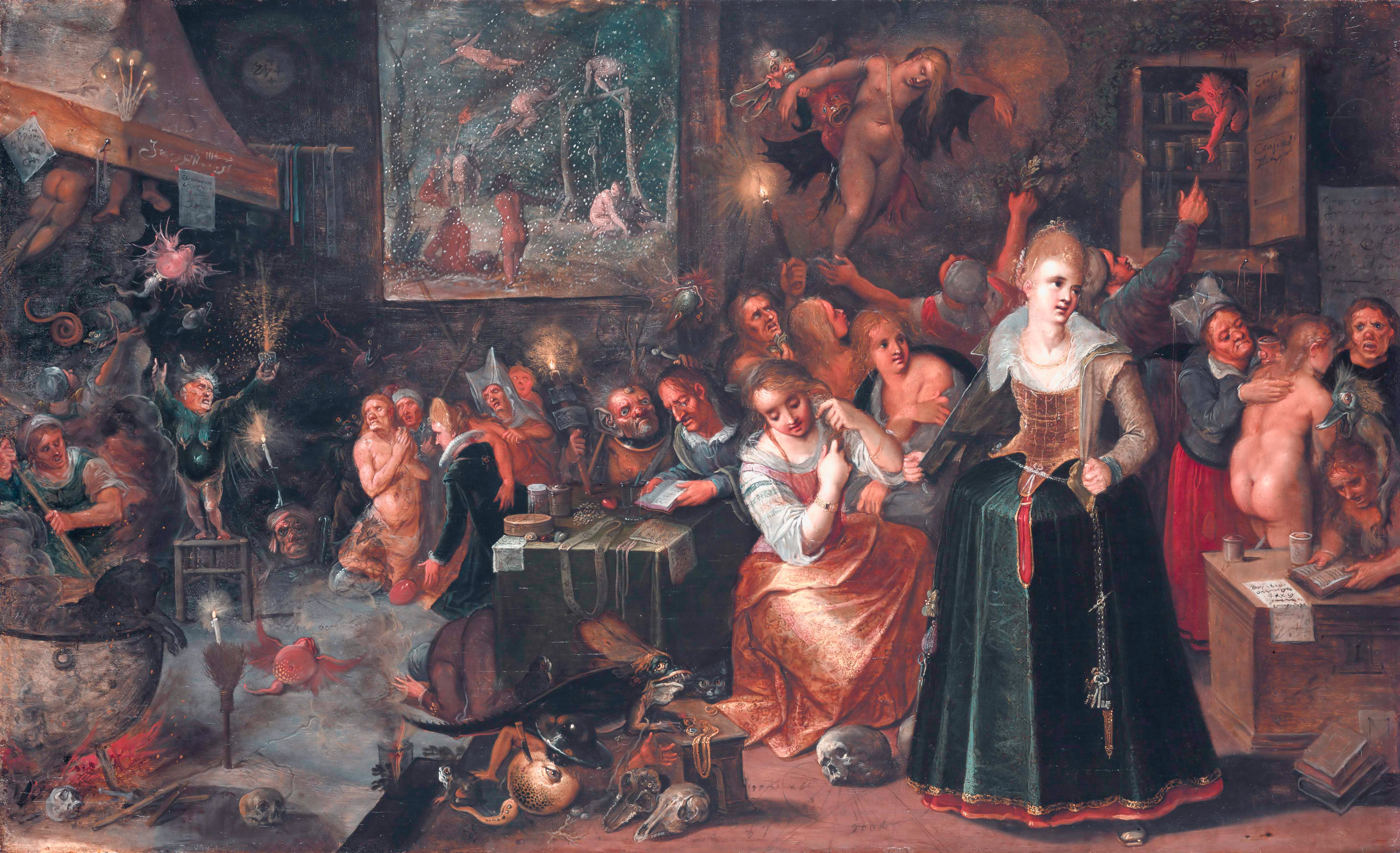
A Witches' Sabbath by Frans Francken the Younger. Note on extreme right pots of magic ointment and older witch applying ointment to back of naked younger witch

Flying ointment is a substance described in European folklore and early modern witch trials as enabling witches to fly, often on broomsticks. These ointments were believed to contain hallucinogenic plants and were linked to the superstition of witches flying at night to Witches' Sabbaths.

== Name ==
The ointment is known by a wide variety of names, including witches' flying ointment, green ointment, magic salve, or lycanthropic ointment. In German it was Hexensalbe (lit. 'witch salve') or Flugsalbe (lit. 'flying salve'). Latin names included unguentum sabbati lit. 'sabbath unguent'), unguentum pharelis, unguentum populi (lit. 'poplar unguent') or unguenta somnifera (lit. 'sleeping unguent').

== Composition ==
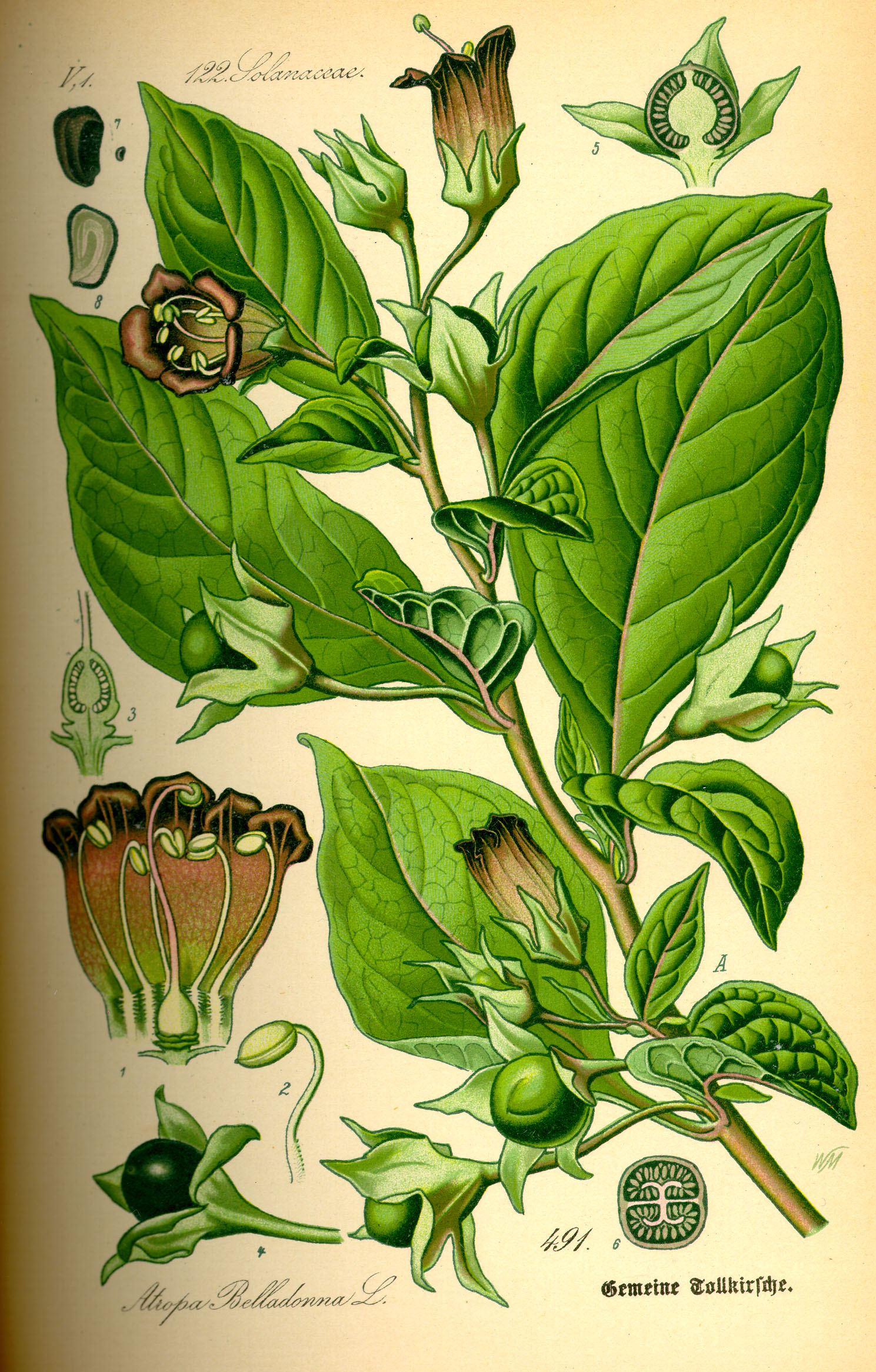
Ingredient: Deadly Nightshade, Atropa belladonna

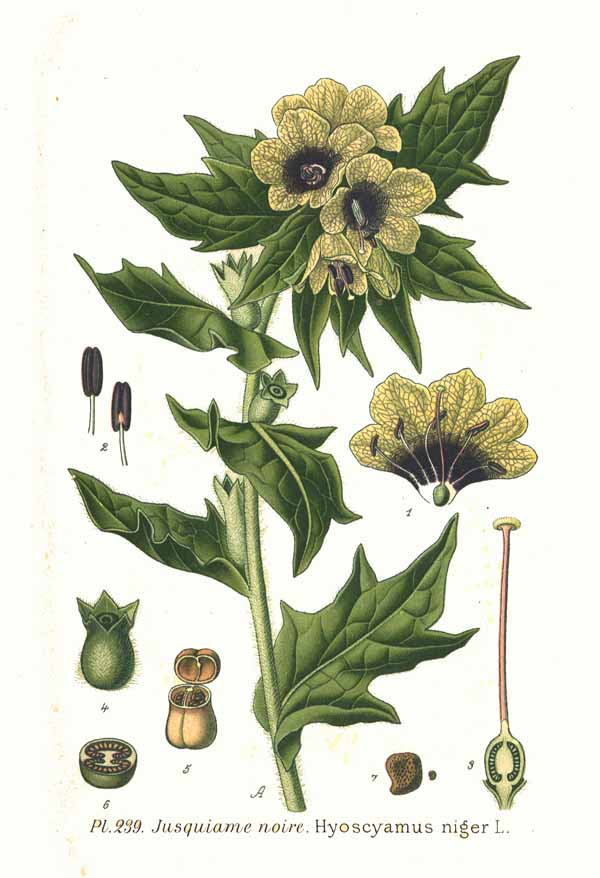
Ingredient: Black Henbane, Hyoscyamus niger

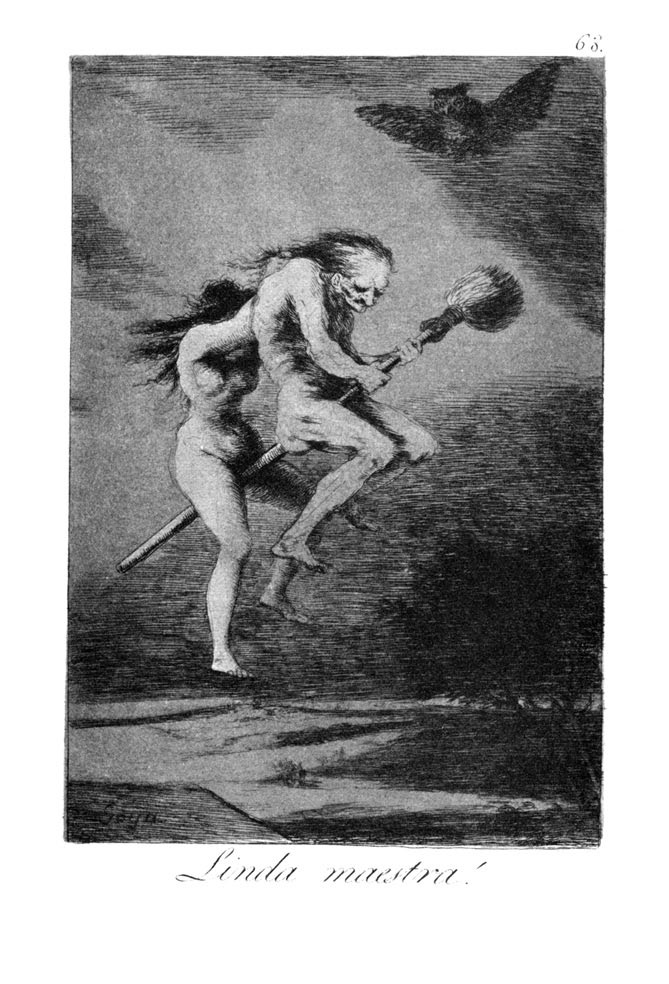
Witches flying to the Sabbath: Capricho No. 68: Linda maestra (Pretty teacher) by Francisco Goya – from the series Los Caprichos

Poisonous ingredients listed in works on ethnobotany include: belladonna, henbane bell, jimson weed, black henbane, mandrake, hemlock, and/or wolfsbane, most of which contain atropine, hyoscyamine, and/or scopolamine. Scopolamine can cause psychotropic effects when absorbed transdermally. These tropane alkaloids are classified as deliriants in regards to their psychoactive effects.

Francis Bacon (attributed as "Lord Verulam") listed the ingredients of the witches ointment as "the fat of children digged out of their graves, of juices of smallage, wolfe-bane, and cinque foil, mingled with the meal of fine wheat."

== Extreme toxicity of active ingredients ==
With the exception of Potentilla reptans, the plants most frequently recorded as ingredients in Early Modern recipes for flying ointments are extremely toxic and have caused numerous fatalities when eaten, whether by confusion with edible species or in cases of criminal poisoning or suicide.

The historian, occultist and theosophist Carl Kiesewetter of Meiningen experimented on himself with various flying ointment ingredients in the nineteenth century. He eventually died during one of these experiments.

== Bodily flight versus flight in spirit ==
He little knows the Devil who does believe that witches and wizards can be borne through the air at wondrous speed to far distant places and there hold revels, dances and suchlike with folk of the same type

the mediaeval witch-ointments...brought visionary beings into the presence of the patient, transported him to the witches' sabbath, enabled him to turn into a beast.

Magic ointments...produced effects which the subjects themselves believed in, even stating that they had intercourse with evil spirits, had been at the Sabbat and danced on the Brocken with their lovers...The peculiar hallucinations evoked by the drug had been so powerfully transmitted from the subconscious mind to consciousness that mentally uncultivated persons...believed them to be reality.

It has been a subject of discussion between clergymen as to whether witches were able physically to fly to the Sabbath on their brooms with help of the ointment, or whether such 'flight' was explicable in other ways: a delusion created by the Devil in the minds of the witches; the souls of the witches leaving their bodies to fly in spirit to the Sabbath; or a hallucinatory 'trip' facilitated by the entheogenic effects of potent drugs absorbed through the skin. An early proponent of the last explanation was Renaissance scholar and scientist Giambattista della Porta, who not only interviewed users of the flying ointment, but witnessed its effects upon such users first hand, comparing the deathlike trances he observed in his subjects with their subsequent accounts of the bacchanalian revelry they had 'enjoyed'.

== Body in coma and riding on beasts ==
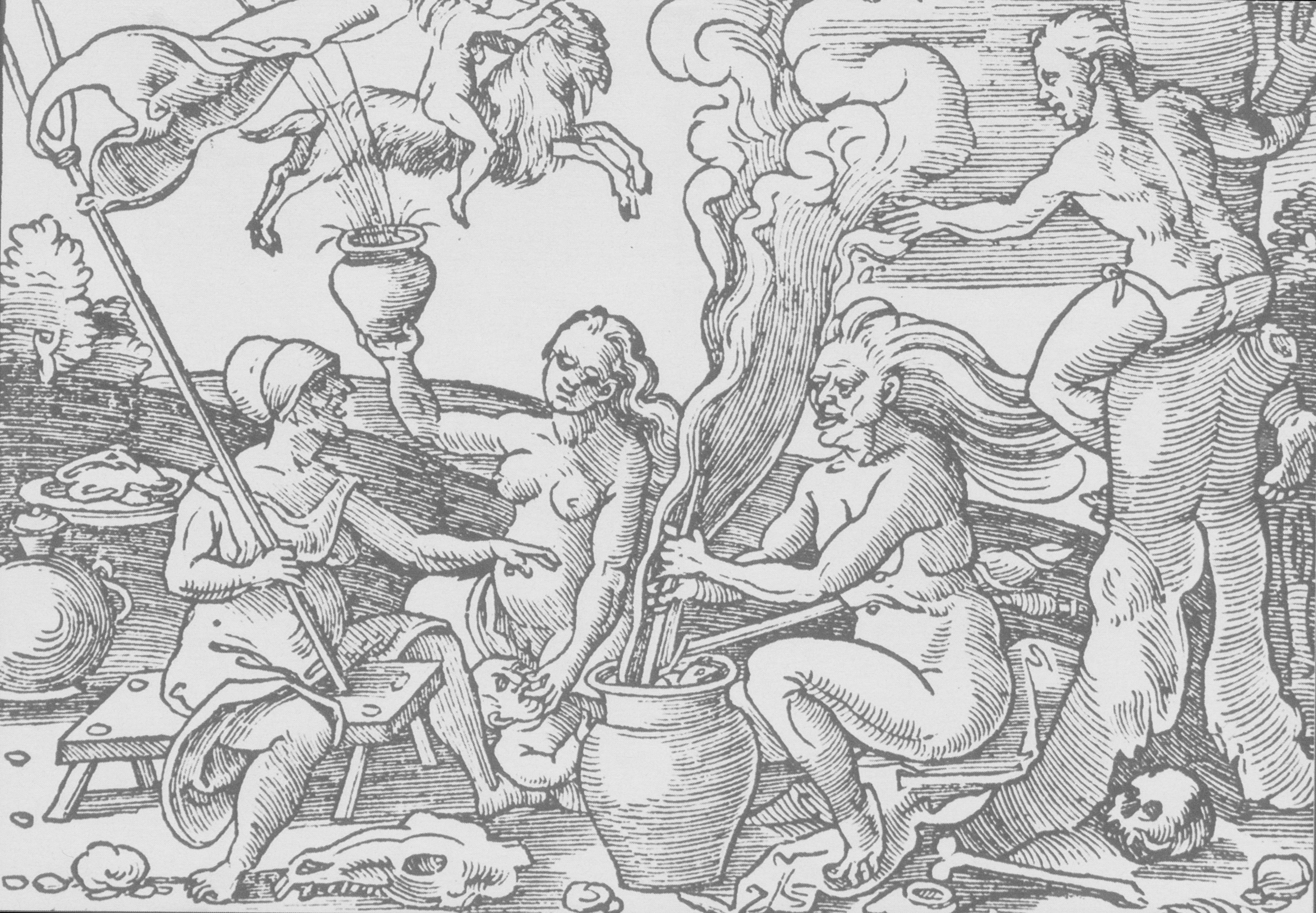
Witches prepare a magic salve. Note naked witch top left riding through the air mounted upon a goat. (woodcut, 1571)

[Witches], male and female... anointing themselves with certain unguents and reciting certain words, are carried by night through the air to distant lands to do certain [black magic]... But nothing of this is true, though they think it to be... while they are thus dead and cold they have no more feeling than a corpse and may be scourged and burnt; but after the time agreed upon... their senses are liberated, they arise well and merry, relate what they have done and bring news from other lands.

Dominican churchman Bartolommeo Spina of Pisa gives two accounts of the power of the flying ointment in his Tractatus de strigibus sive maleficis ('Treatise on witches or evildoers') of 1525. The first concerns an incident in the life of his acquaintance Augustus de Turre of Bergamo, a physician. While studying medicine in Pavia as a young man, Augustus returned late one night to his lodgings (without a key) to find no one awake to let him in. Climbing up to a balcony, he was able to enter through a window, and at once sought out the maidservant, who should have been awake to admit him. On checking her room, however, he found her lying unconscious – beyond rousing – on the floor. The following morning he tried to question her on the matter, but she would only reply that she had been 'on a journey'.

Bartolommeo's second account is more suggestive and points toward another element in the witches' 'flights'. It concerns a certain notary of Lugano who, unable to find his wife one morning, searched for her all over their estate and finally discovered her lying deeply unconscious, naked and dirty in a corner of the pigsty. The notary 'immediately understood that she was a witch' and at first wanted to kill her on the spot, but, thinking better of such rashness, waited until she recovered from her stupor, in order to question her. Terrified by his wrath, the poor woman fell to her knees and confessed that during the night she had 'been on a journey'.

Light is cast on the tale of the notary's wife by two accounts widely separated in time but revealing a persistent theme in European Witchcraft. The first is that of Regino of Prüm whose De synodalibus causis et disciplinis ecclesiasticis libri duo (circa 906 C.E.) speaks of women who 'seduced...by demons...insist that they ride at night on certain beasts [italics not original] together with Diana, goddess of the pagans, and a great multitude of women; that they cover great distances in the silence of the deepest night...' (See also Canon Episcopi).

The second account dates from some 800 years later, coming from Norway in the early 18th century and is the testimony, at the age of thirteen, of one Siri Jørgensdatter. Siri claimed that when she was seven her grandmother had taken her to the Witches' Sabbath on the mountain meadow Blockula ('blue-hill'): her grandmother led her to a pigsty, where she smeared a sow with some ointment which she took from a horn, whereupon grandmother and granddaughter mounted the animal and, after a short ride through the air, arrived at a building on the Sabbath mountain.

== Alleged sexual element in application ==
The hallucinations are frequently dominated by the erotic moment...in those days, in order to experience these sensations, young and old women would rub their bodies with the 'witches' salve'.

the witches confess that...they anoint a staff and ride on it to the appointed place or anoint themselves under the arms and in other hairy places...[Italics not original to text].

in rifleing the closet of the ladie [Alice Kyteler], they found a pipe of oyntement, wherewith she greased a staffe, upon which she ambled and galloped through thick and thin, when and in what manner she listed.

Some sources have claimed that such an ointment would best be absorbed through mucous membranes, and that the traditional image of a female witch astride a broomstick implies the application of flying ointment to the vulva. The passage from the trial for witchcraft in Ireland of Hiberno-Norman noblewoman Alice Kyteler in 1324 quoted above is, while not explicit, certainly open to interpretations both drug-related and sexual. It is also a very early account of such practices, pre-dating by some centuries witch trials in the early modern period. The testimony of Dame Kyteler's maidservant, Petronilla de Meath, while compromised by having been extracted under torture, contains references not only to her mistress's abilities in the preparation of 'magical' medicines, but also her sexual behaviour, including at least one instance of (alleged) intercourse with a demon. According to the inquisition ('in which were five knights and numerous nobles') set in motion by Richard de Ledrede, Bishop of Ossory, there was in the city of Kilkenny a band of heretical sorcerers, at the head of whom was Dame Alice Kyteler and against whom no fewer than seven charges relating to witchcraft were laid. The fifth charge is of particular interest in the context of the 'greased staffe' mentioned above:

In order to arouse feelings of love or hatred, or to inflict death or disease on the bodies of the faithful, they made use of powders, unguents, ointments and candles of fat, which were compounded as follows. They took the entrails of cocks sacrificed to demons, certain horrible worms, various unspecified herbs, dead men's nails, the hair, brains, and shreds of the cerements of boys who were buried unbaptized, with other abominations, all of which they cooked, with various incantations, over a fire of oak-logs in a vessel made out of the skull of a decapitated thief.

== Possible opiate component ==
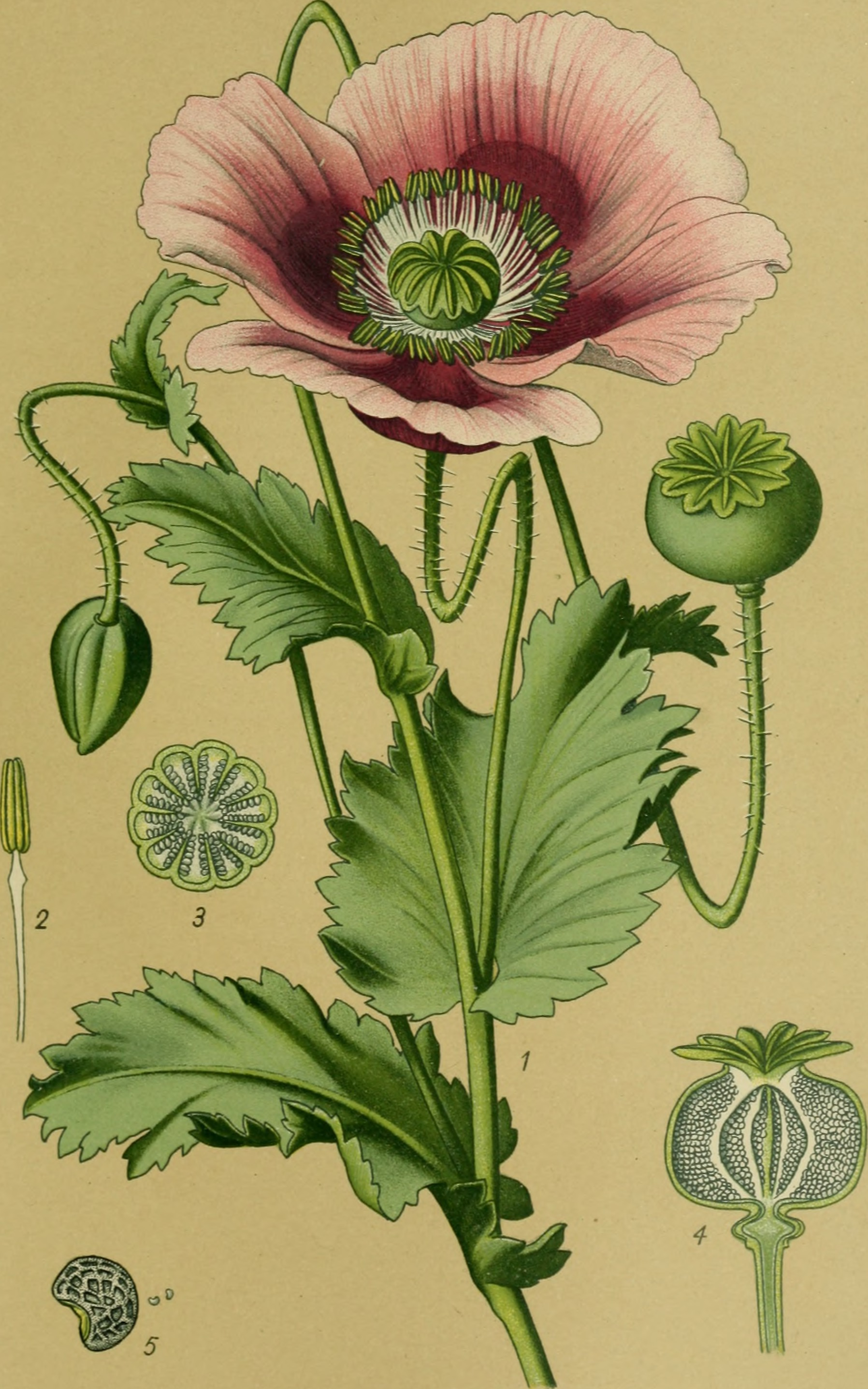
Opium Poppy: Papaver somniferum

One possible key to how individuals dealt with the toxicity of the nightshades usually said to be part of flying ointments is through the supposed antidotal reaction some of the solanaceous alkaloids have with the alkaloids of Papaver somniferum (opium poppy). This antagonism was claimed to exist by the movement of Eclectic medicine. For instance, King's American Dispensatory states in the entry on belladonna: "Belladonna and opium appear to exert antagonistic influences, especially as regards their action on the brain, the spinal cord, and heart; they have consequently been recommended and employed as antidotes to each other in cases of poisoning" going on to make the extravagant claim that "this matter is now positively and satisfactorily settled; hence in all cases of poisoning by belladonna the great remedy is morphine, and its use may be guided by the degree of pupillary contraction it occasions."

The synergy between belladonna and poppy alkaloids was made use of in the so-called "twilight sleep" that was provided for women during childbirth beginning in the Edwardian era. Twilight sleep was a mixture of scopolamine, a belladonna alkaloid, and morphine, a Papaver alkaloid, that was injected and which furnished a combination of painkilling and amnesia for a woman in labor. A version is still manufactured for use as the injectable compound Omnopon.

There is no definite indication of the proportions of solanaceous herbs vs. poppy used in flying ointments, and most historical recipes for flying ointment do not include poppy. Furthermore, a reputable publication by the former UK Ministry of Agriculture, Food and Fisheries (now DEFRA) states specifically that, in cases of poisoning by Atropa belladonna – far from being antidotes – 'Preparations containing morphine or opiates should be avoided as they have a synergic action with atropine', an appropriate antidote being, by contrast, the acetylcholinesterase inhibitor physostigmine salicylate.

== Historical documents ==
The first mention of an unguent in relation to a popular belief of orgiastic flying occurs in Roland of Cremona's theological summa, written in the 1230s. The use by witches of flying ointments was first described, according to known sources, by Johannes Hartlieb in 1456. It was also described by the Spanish theologian Alfonso Tostado (d. 1455) in Super Genesis Commentaria (printed in Venice, 1507), whose commentary tended to accredit the thesis of the reality of the Witches' Sabbath. In 1477, Antoine Rose confessed while being tortured that the devil gave her a stick 18 inches in length on which she would rub an ointment and with the words "go, in the name of the Devil, go" would fly to the "synagogue" (an alternative name for Witches' Sabbath).

== Modern interpretation ==
Historians generally regard most surviving accounts of flying ointment as impossible to verify because they come from confessions obtained under torture, hostile descriptions by witch-hunters, or later folklore rather than firsthand records. Modern scholars have either dismissed the existence of flying ointment entirely or speculated that such ointments and "broomsticks" were actually used for masturbation, to evoke altered states of consciousness, or both. According to this latter interpretation, ointments made from plants such as belladonna, henbane, and mandrake produced hallucinations, including the sensation of flight, and users applied them to the skin or mucous membranes to absorb the active compounds. The "broomstick" was used to apply the ointment to the vagina, and in some cases may have doubled as a sexual device.

== In popular culture ==
=== Drama ===
There is, in the work of the playwright Francisco de Rojas Zorrilla (1607–1648) of Toledo, an exchange concerning the flying ointment, the (following) passage occurring in the play Lo que quería el Marqués de Villena ('What the Marquis of Villena Wanted').

Marquis: Others believe that witches can fly.

Zambapalo: And can't they?

Marquis: Certainly not, you ignorant fellow.

Zambapalo: Since I'm no specialist in these matters, I must ask you what happens.

Marquis: They all rub themselves with ointment.

Zambapalo: And then what?

Marquis: The ointment, which is an opiate made of henbane given them by the Devil, sends them to sleep, and they dream such a dream that they think they are not dreaming at all. And since the Devil has great power to deceive, he makes them all dream the same dream. And that is why they think they are flying through the air, when they are really fast asleep. And although they never fly at all, they think, as soon as they wake, that they have all been to see the calf, and all visited the fields at Baraona. When, by God, in reality, more than two of them have been seen sleeping in their rooms with the ointment on them.

=== Literature and film ===
- In Nathaniel Hawthorne's 1835 short story "Young Goodman Brown", Goody Cloyse, after meeting the Devil, says "I was all anointed with the juice of smallage, and cinquefoil, and wolf's bane" to which the Devil replies "[m]ingled with fine wheat and the fat of a new-born babe".
- In Mikhail Bulgakov's The Master and Margarita, Margarita, after agreeing to act as hostess at Dr Woland's ball, uses the ointment to become a witch and fly to the estate where the event is being held.
- In Clayton Rawson's 1938 novel Death from a Top Hat, two recipes by Johann Weyer, a 16th-century demonologist, are given in a footnote:

1-Water hemlock, sweet flag, cinquefoil, bat's blood, deadly nightshade and oil.
2-Baby's fat, juice of cowbane, aconite, cinquefoil, deadly nightshade and soot.

- In E. L. Konigsburg's 1967 novel Jennifer, Hecate, Macbeth, William McKinley, and Me, Elizabeth, two characters try to make a flying ointment.
- In the 1989 movie serial Warlock, the villain kills an unbaptised boy to get this "Flying Ointment".
- In the 1993 book Calling on Dragons (Book three of the Enchanted Forest Chronicles), the witch Morwen uses a flying potion on a straw basket and a broomstick, not on herself.
- In Jodi Picoult's 2001 novel Salem Falls, a group of four girls practicing witchcraft ingest a flying ointment made of belladonna.
- In the 2015 horror film The Witch, a witch kills an infant child and makes flying ointment out of his corpse.
- In the 2016 film, The Love Witch, the main character applies a flying ointment to her body.
- In the 2019 film, Portrait of a Lady on Fire, the two main characters apply a flying ointment to their armpits.
- In the 2020 film, Gretel & Hansel, directed by Oz Perkins, the witch, caressing a precious jar filled with ointment, applies it to herself, and then initiates Gretel into witchcraft by inducing her to do the same.

=== Music ===
- The Bonzo Dog Doo-Dah Band song '11 Moustachioed Daughters' – a track on the Album The Doughnut in Granny's Greenhouse – is a darkly comic and surprisingly detailed evocation of the traditional Witches' Sabbath, featuring the flying-ointment-related lines :

'and belladonna, to make your eyes like a...beast's!

To anoint the body and make it shine,

To drink and make thyself divine,

To choose another's form and make it...thine!'

- The Swedish symphonic metal band Therion has a song called Unguentum Sabbati (Ointment of the Sabbat) on the album Sitra Ahra.
- The title track of British Goth band Inkubus Sukkubus’ album Belladonna and Aconite is a song wholly about the flying ointment and features the following lyrics:

‘Belladonna and aconite

Give to me the gift of flight

Take me up, airborne in the night’

— From the opening verse

‘As a screaming horde

We cut the scape… The Devil's Apple exacerbates

To the sabbath on demon steed I ride’

— From the second verse

‘Hemlock, Henbane, Aconite, Belladonna Opium, Thornapple, Cinquefoil, Mandragora’

— From the closing chant

== Gallery ==
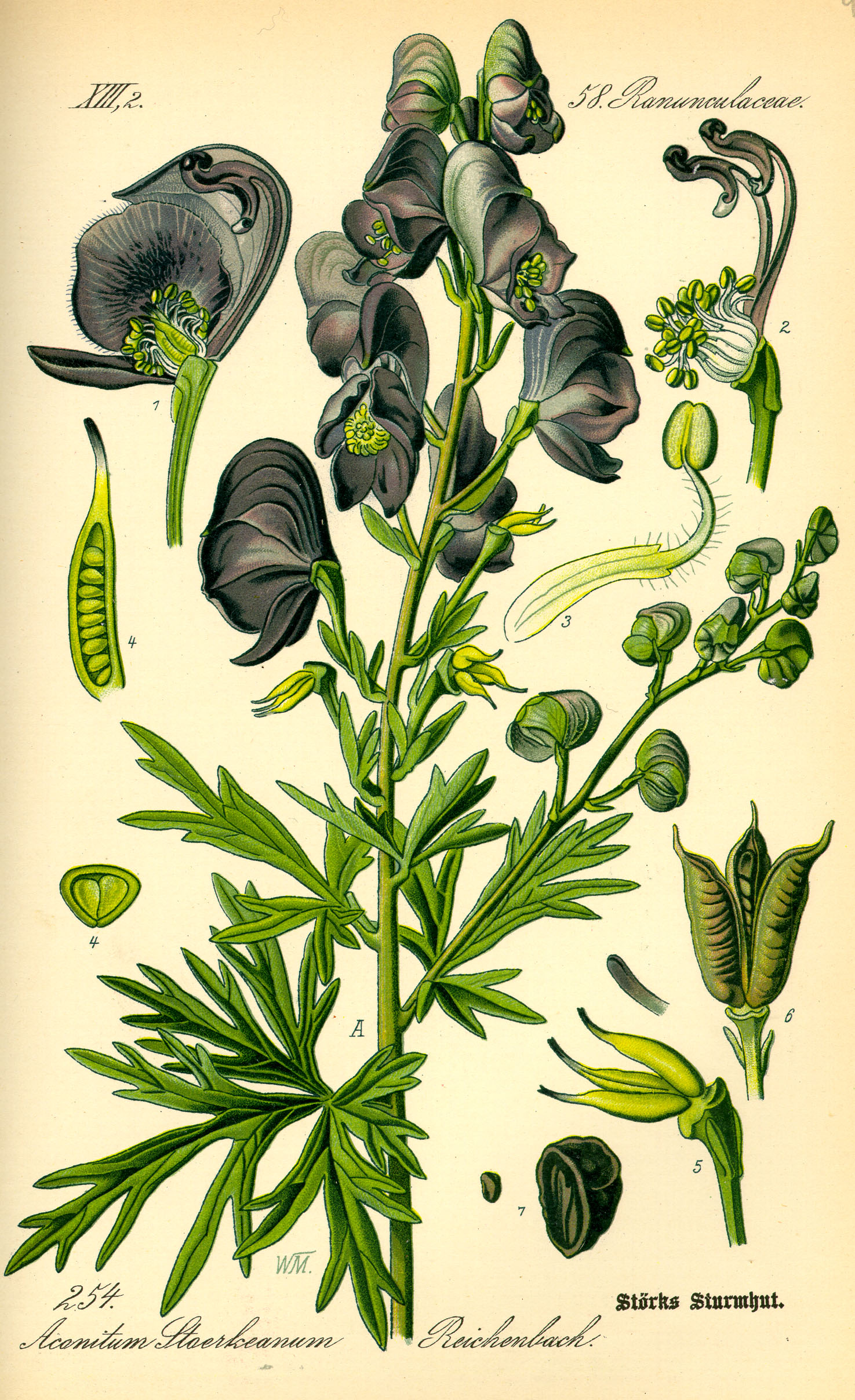
Wolfsbane or aconite, Aconitum napellus (virulent poison)

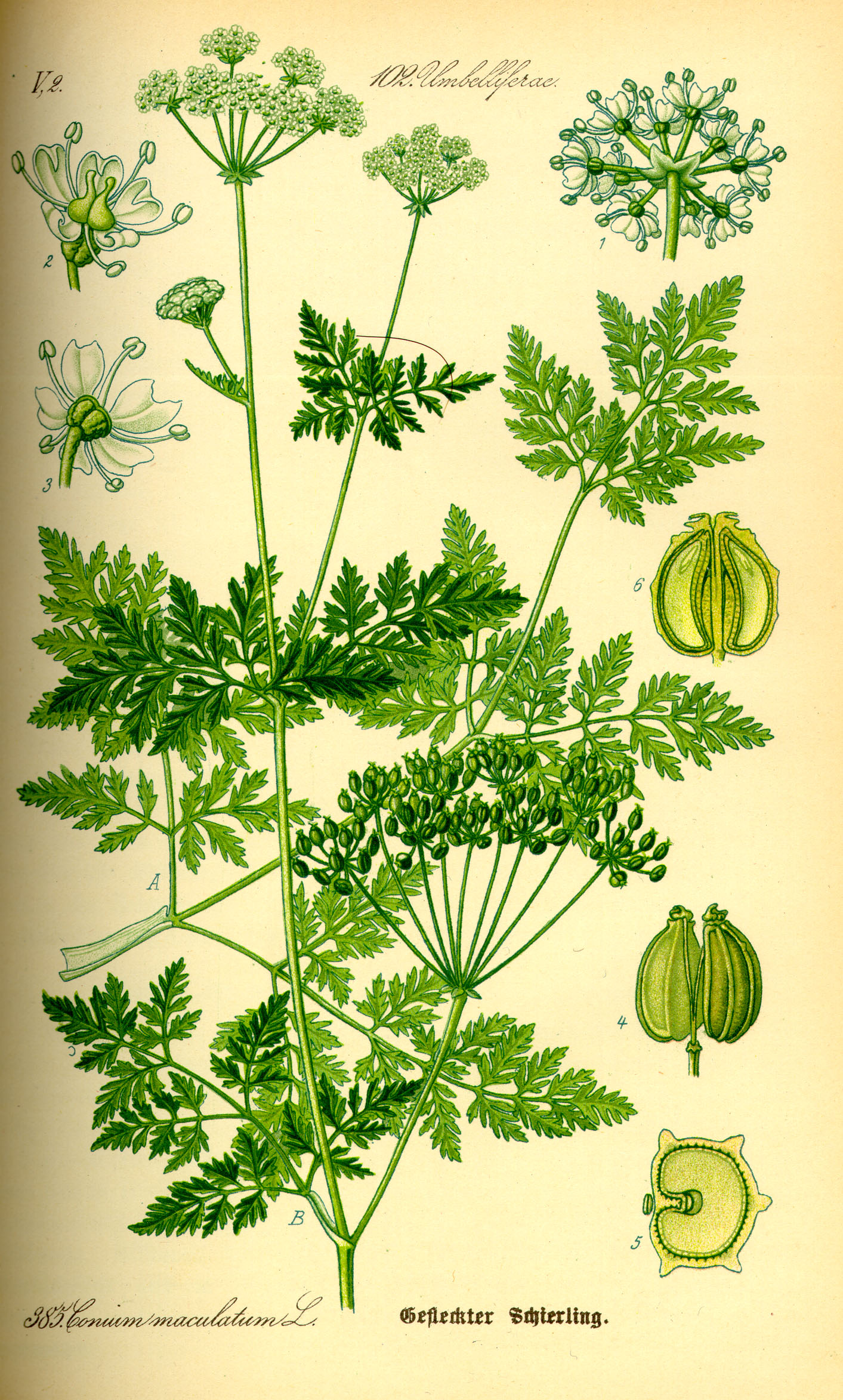
Hemlock, Conium maculatum (virulent poison)

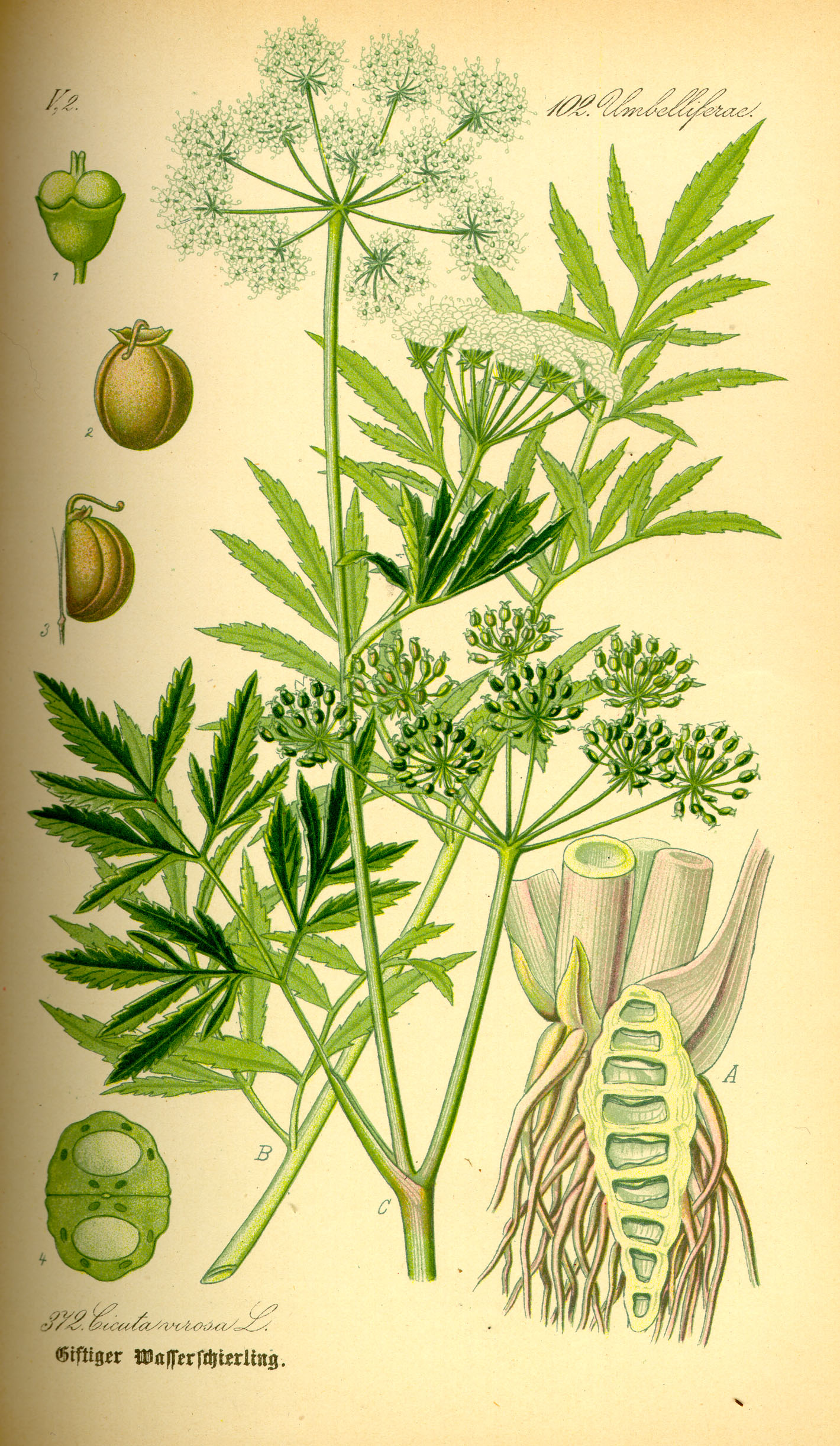
Cowbane or water hemlock, Cicuta virosa (virulent poison)

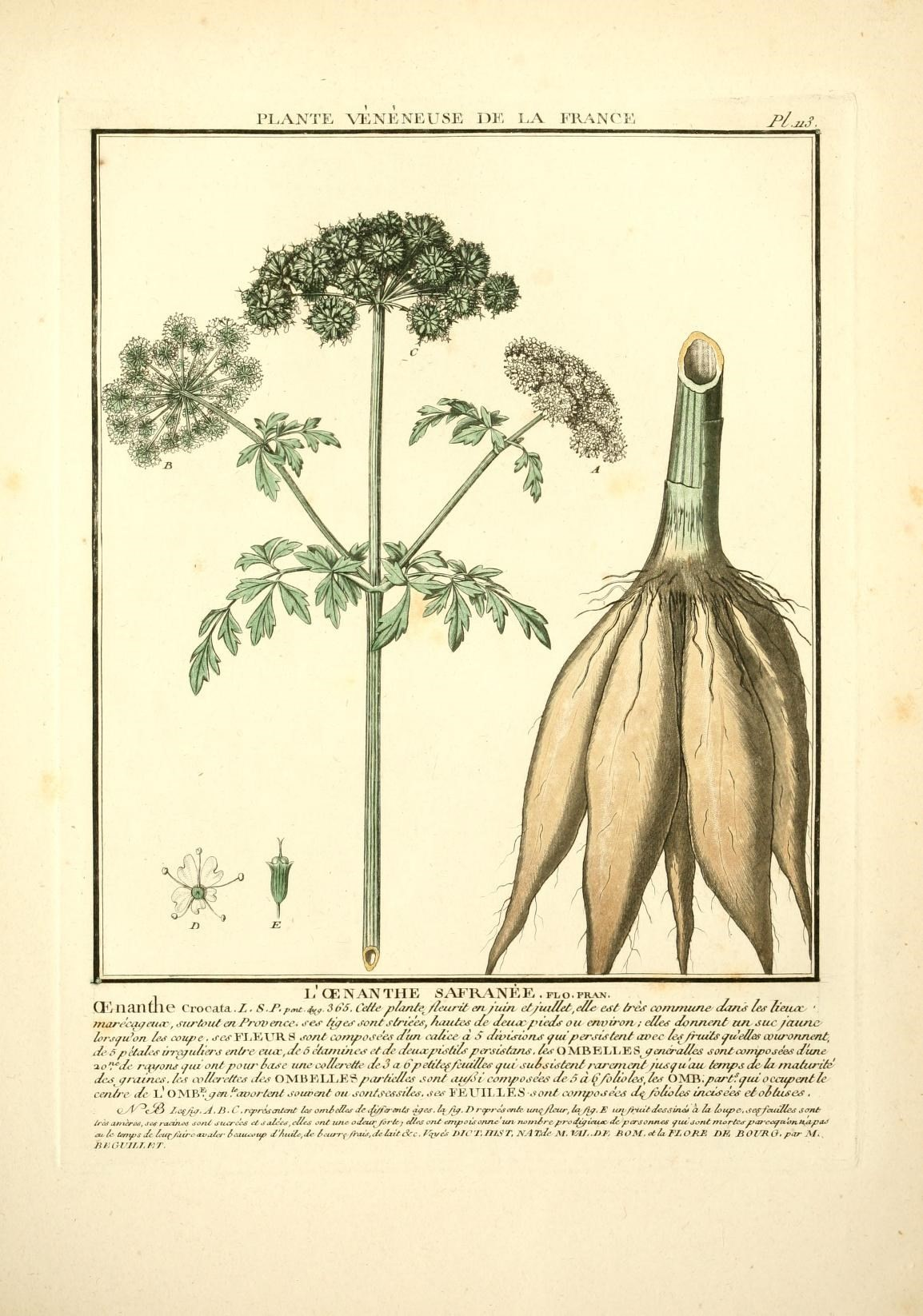
Hemlock water dropwort or water hemlock, Oenanthe crocata (virulent poison)

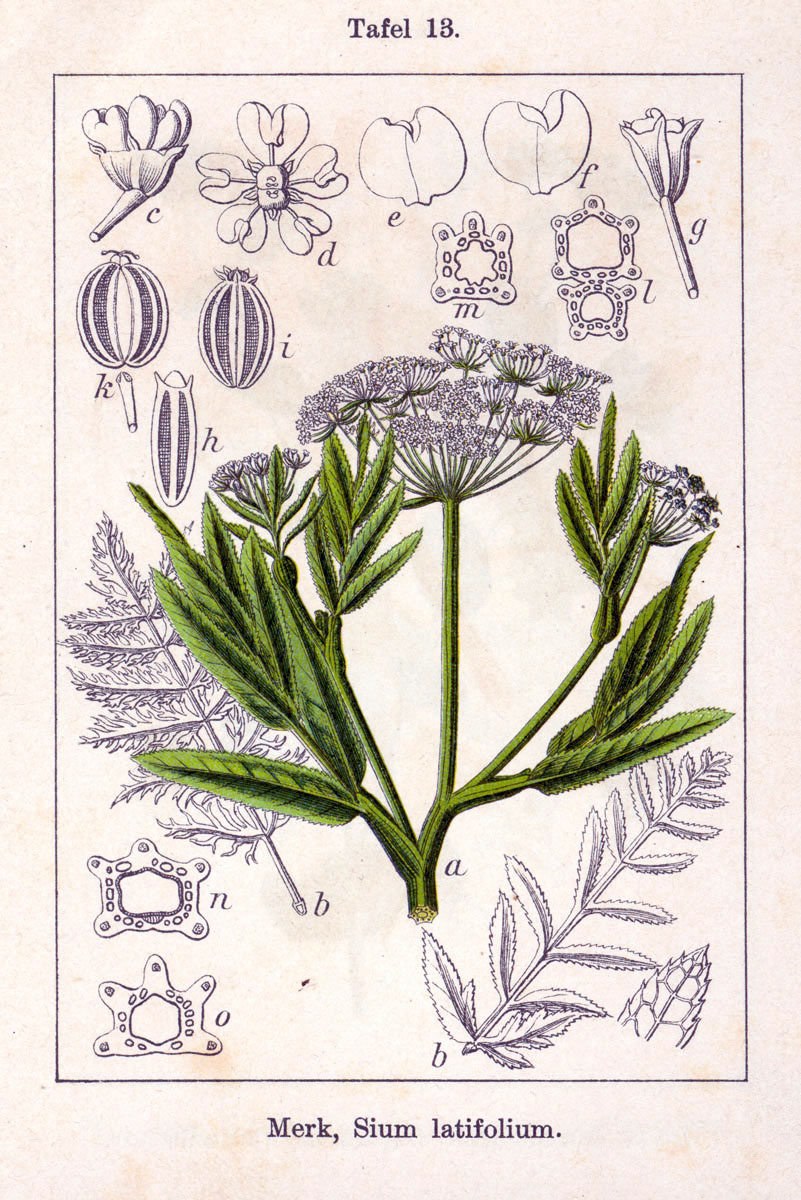
Greater water parsnip or sium, Sium latifolium (root poisonous)

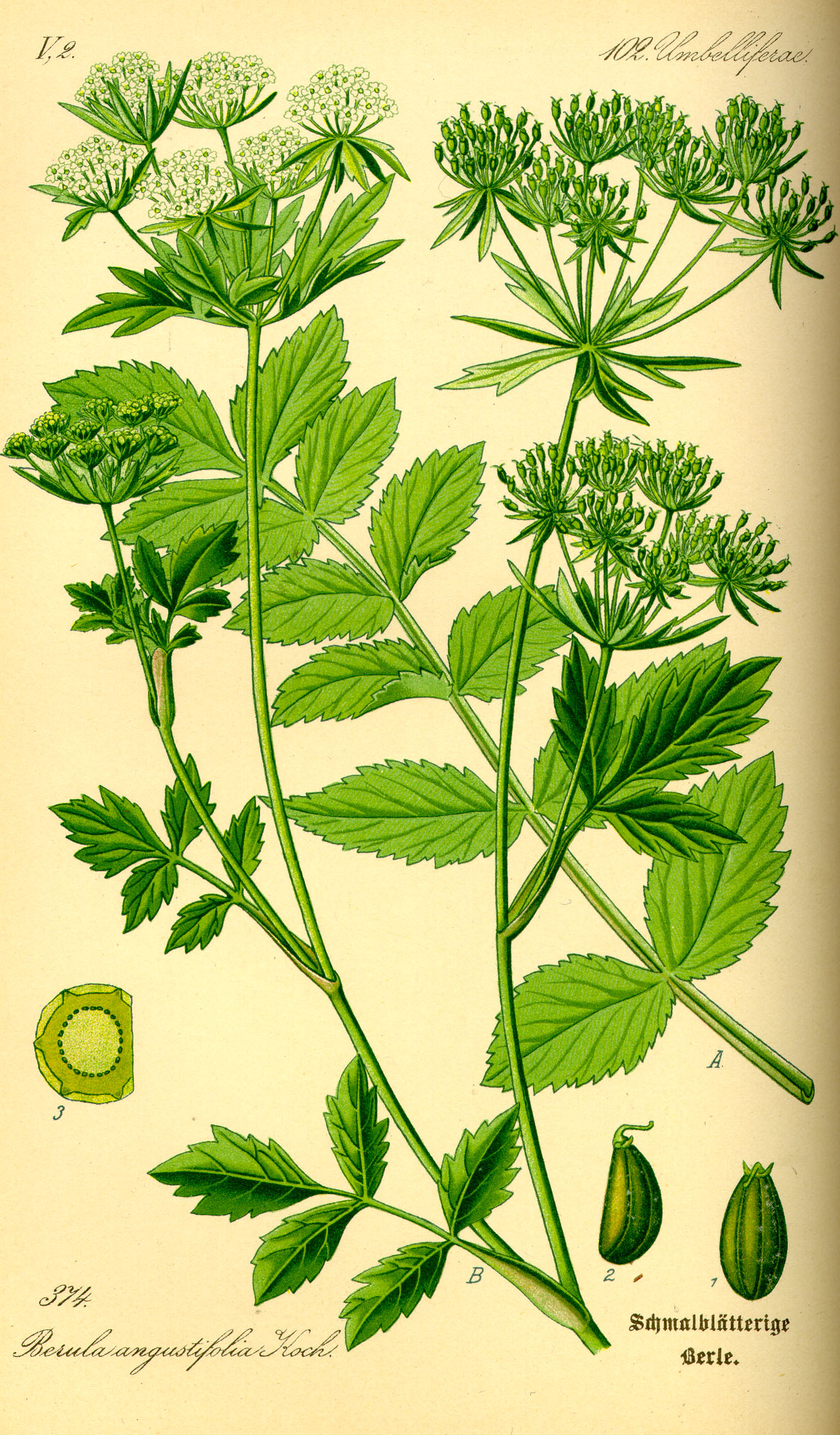
Lesser water parsnip or sium, Berula erecta

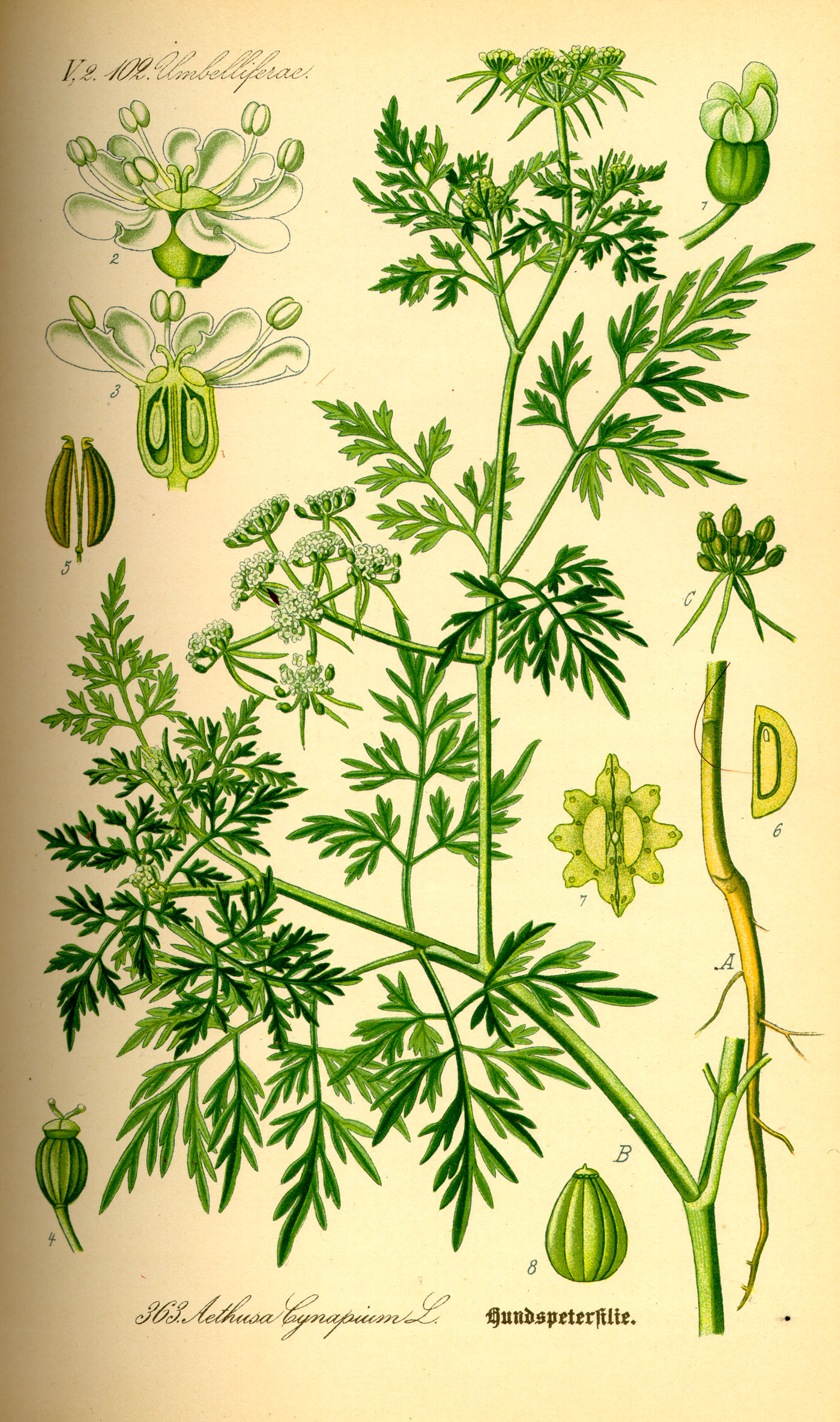
Fool's parsley, Aethusa cynapium (poison)

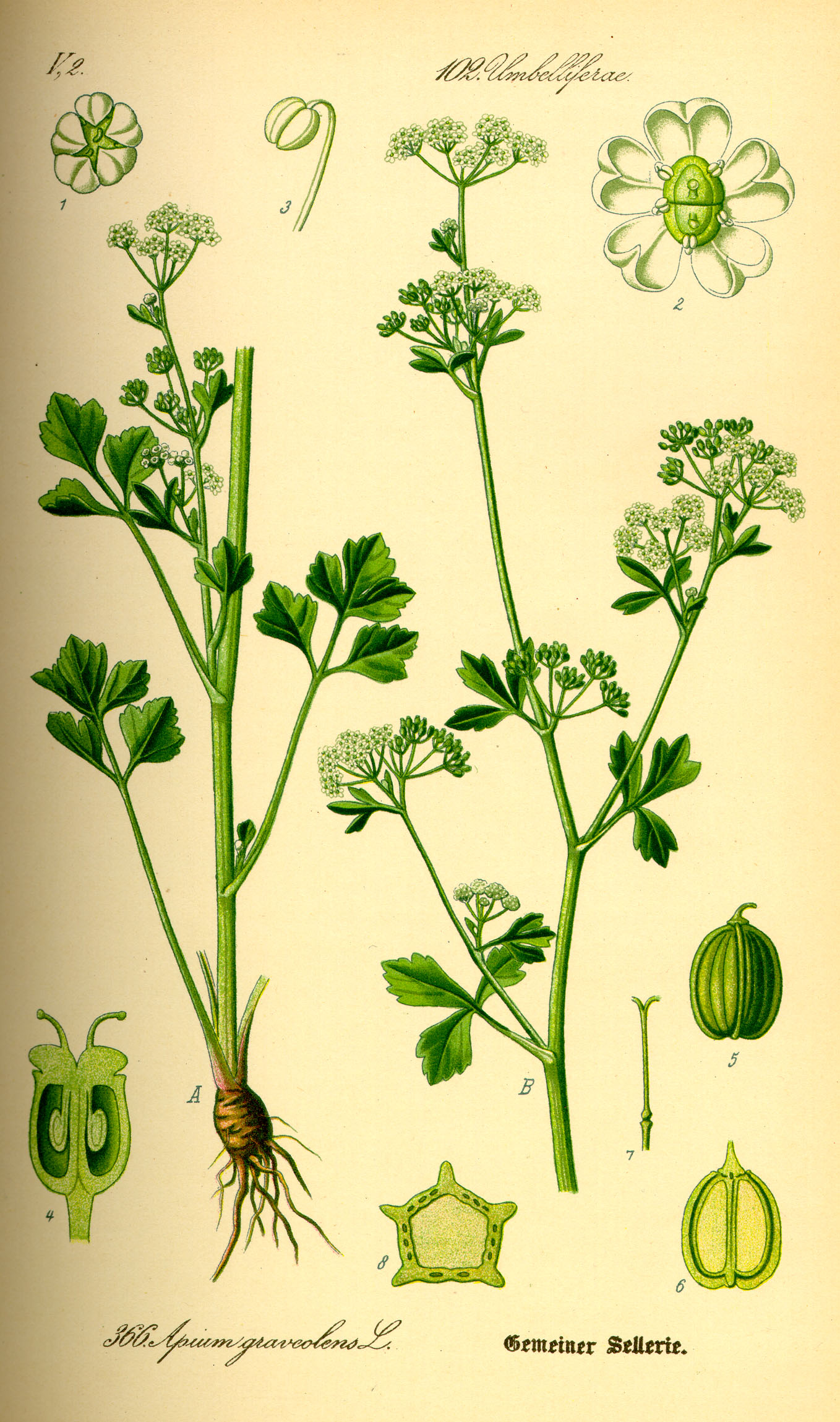
Wild celery, Apium graveolens (wild form of well-known vegetable)

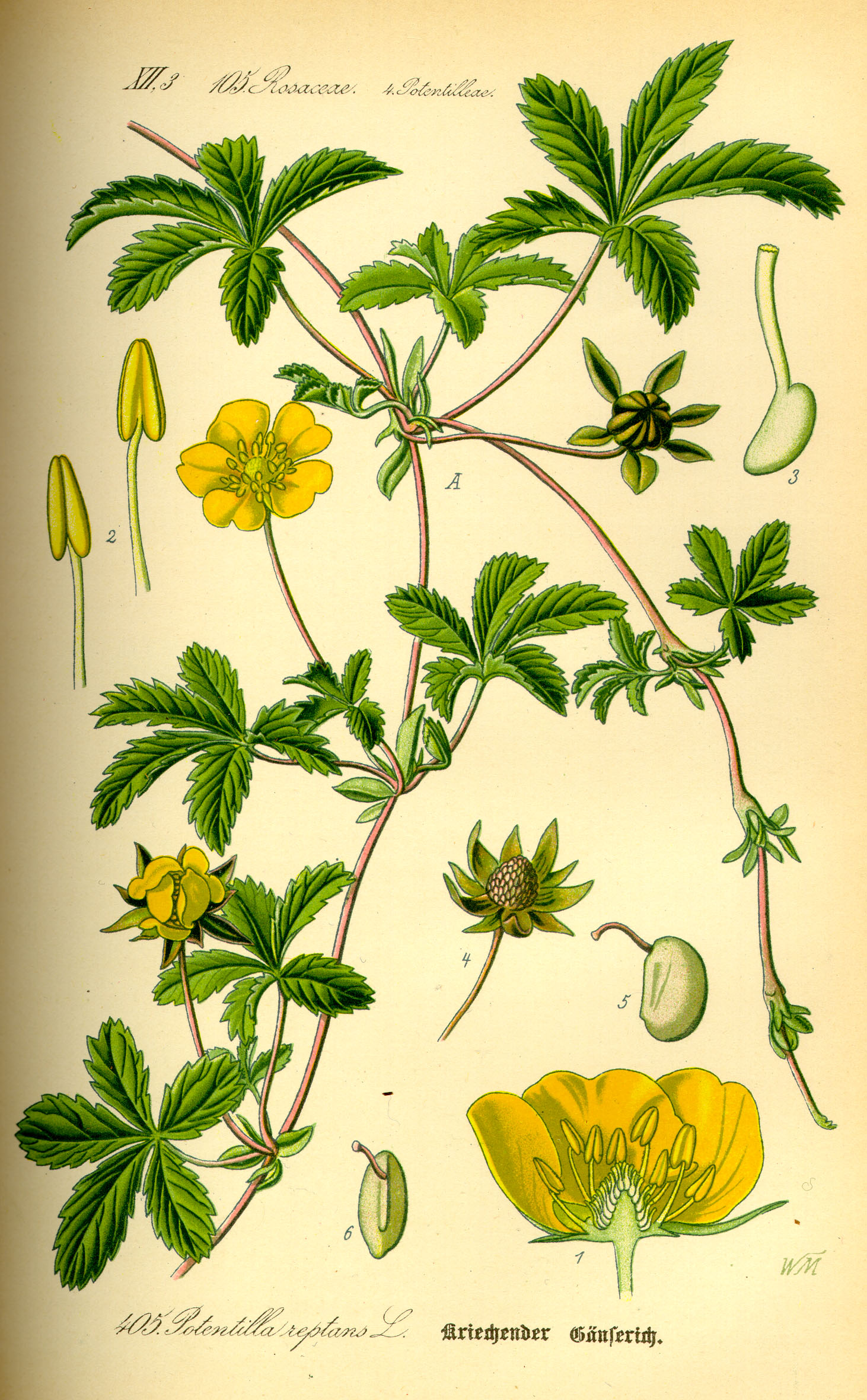
Creeping cinquefoil, Potentilla reptans

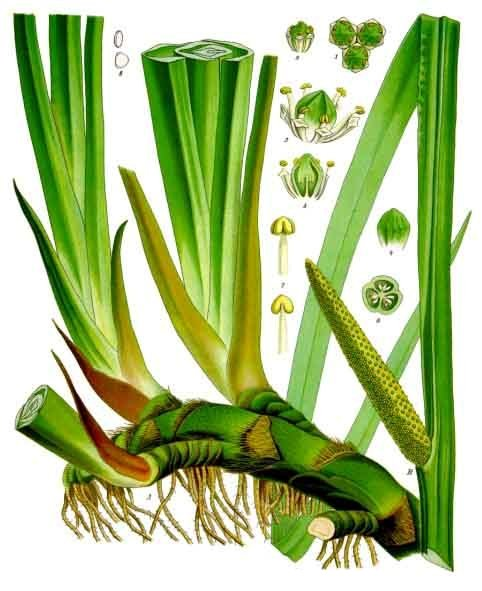
Sweet flag or strewing rush, Acorus calamus (aromatic)

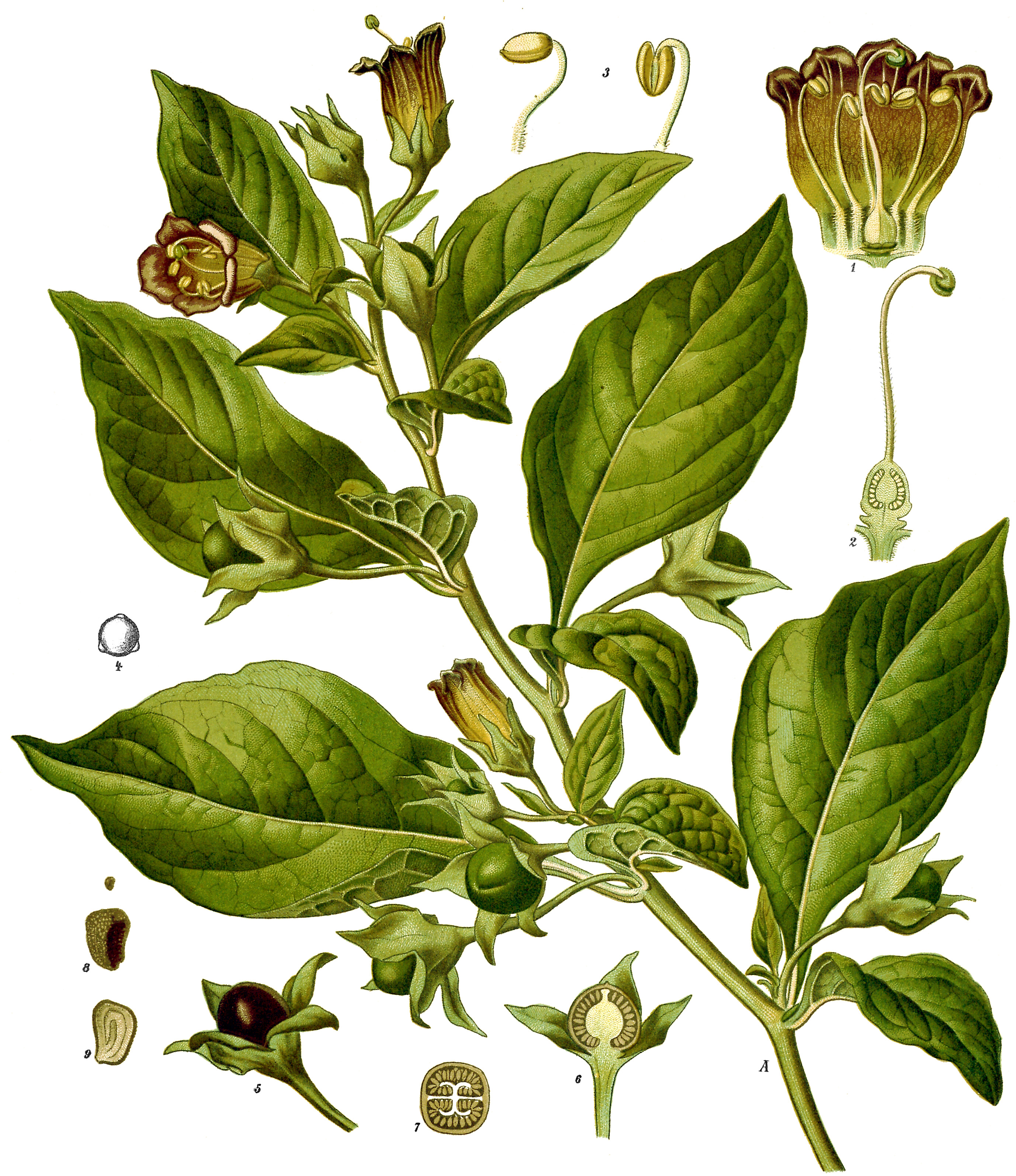
Belladonna or deadly nightshade, Atropa belladonna (virulent poison)

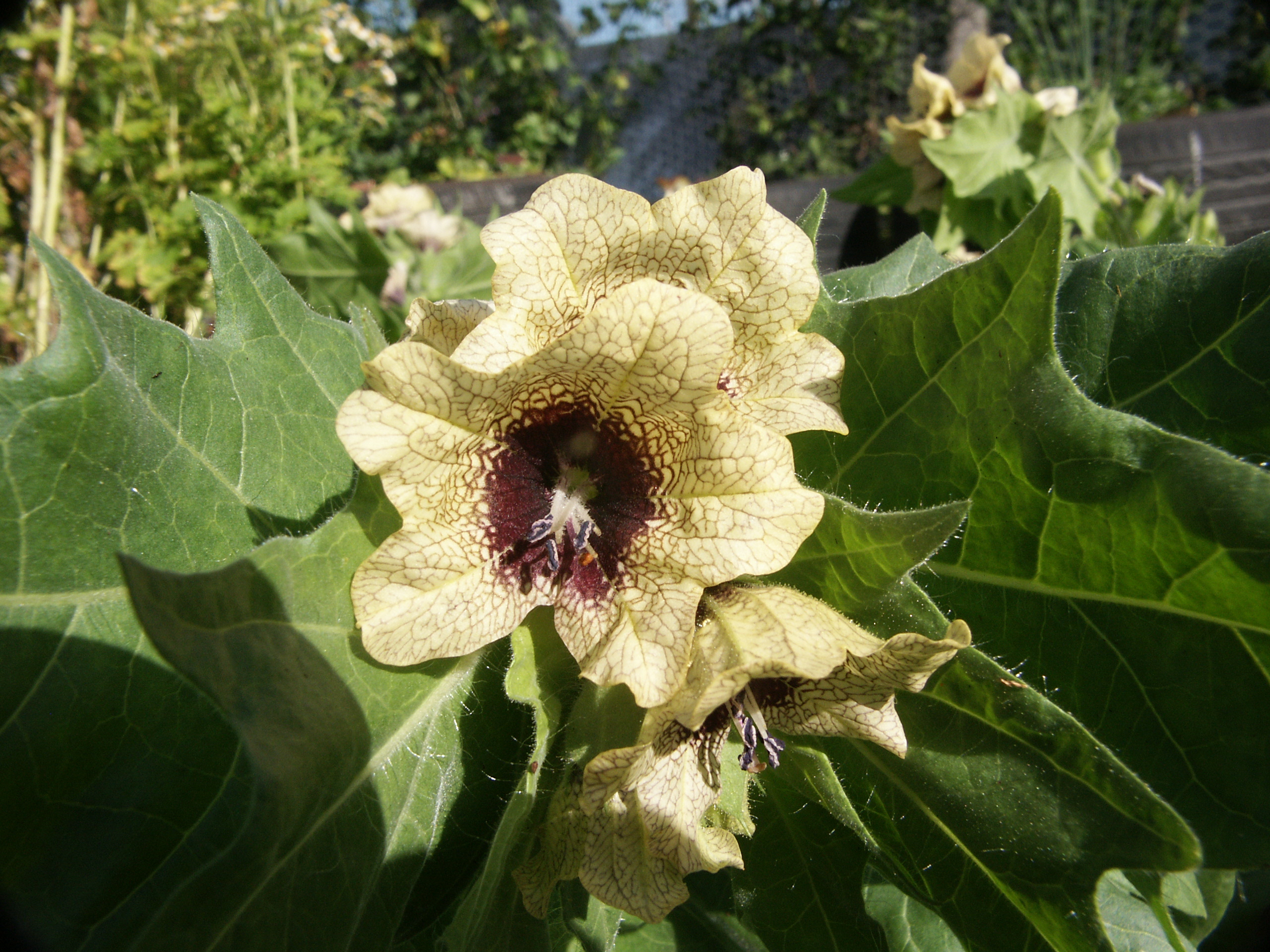
Henbane flower

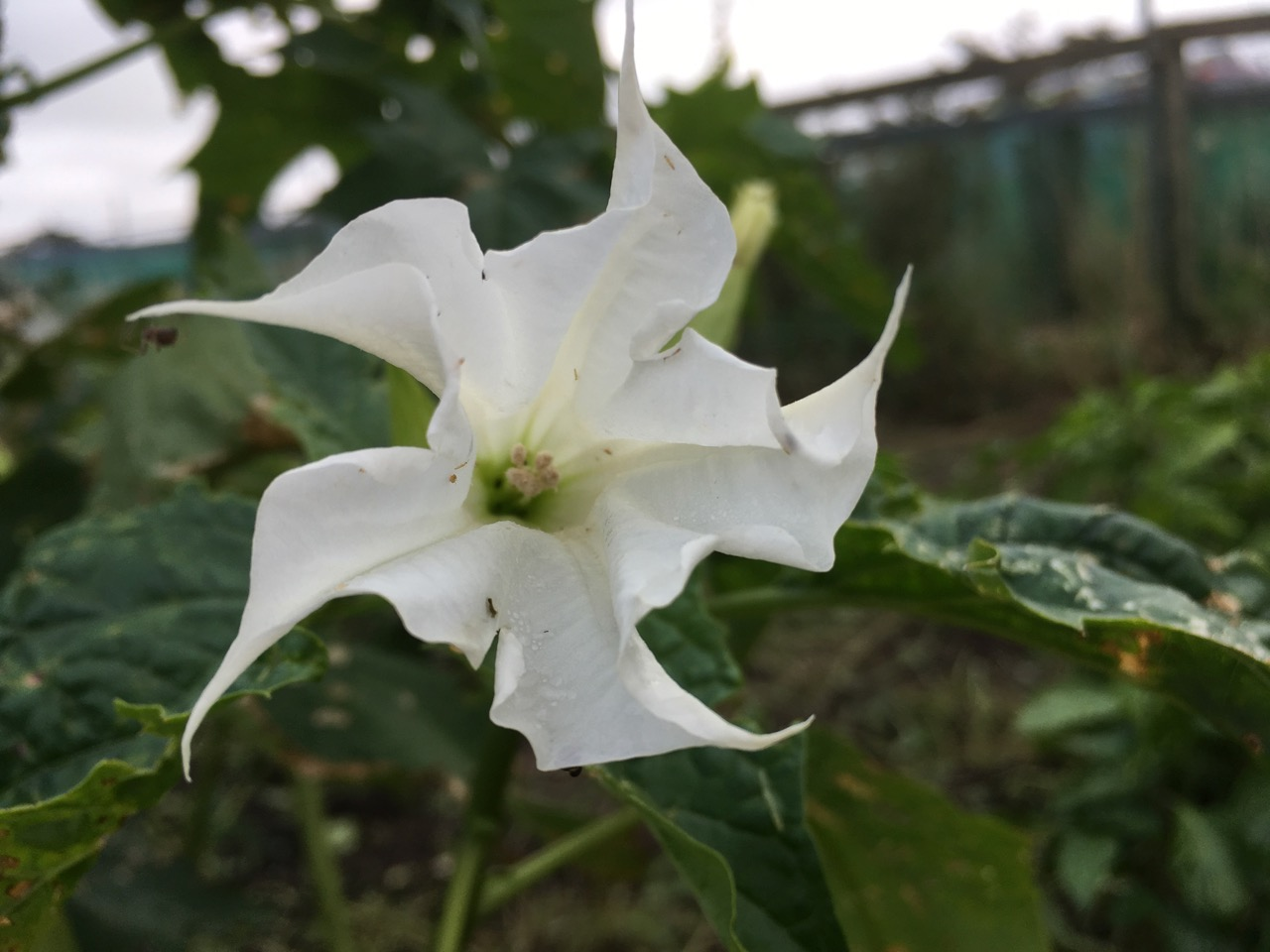
Jimsonweed flower

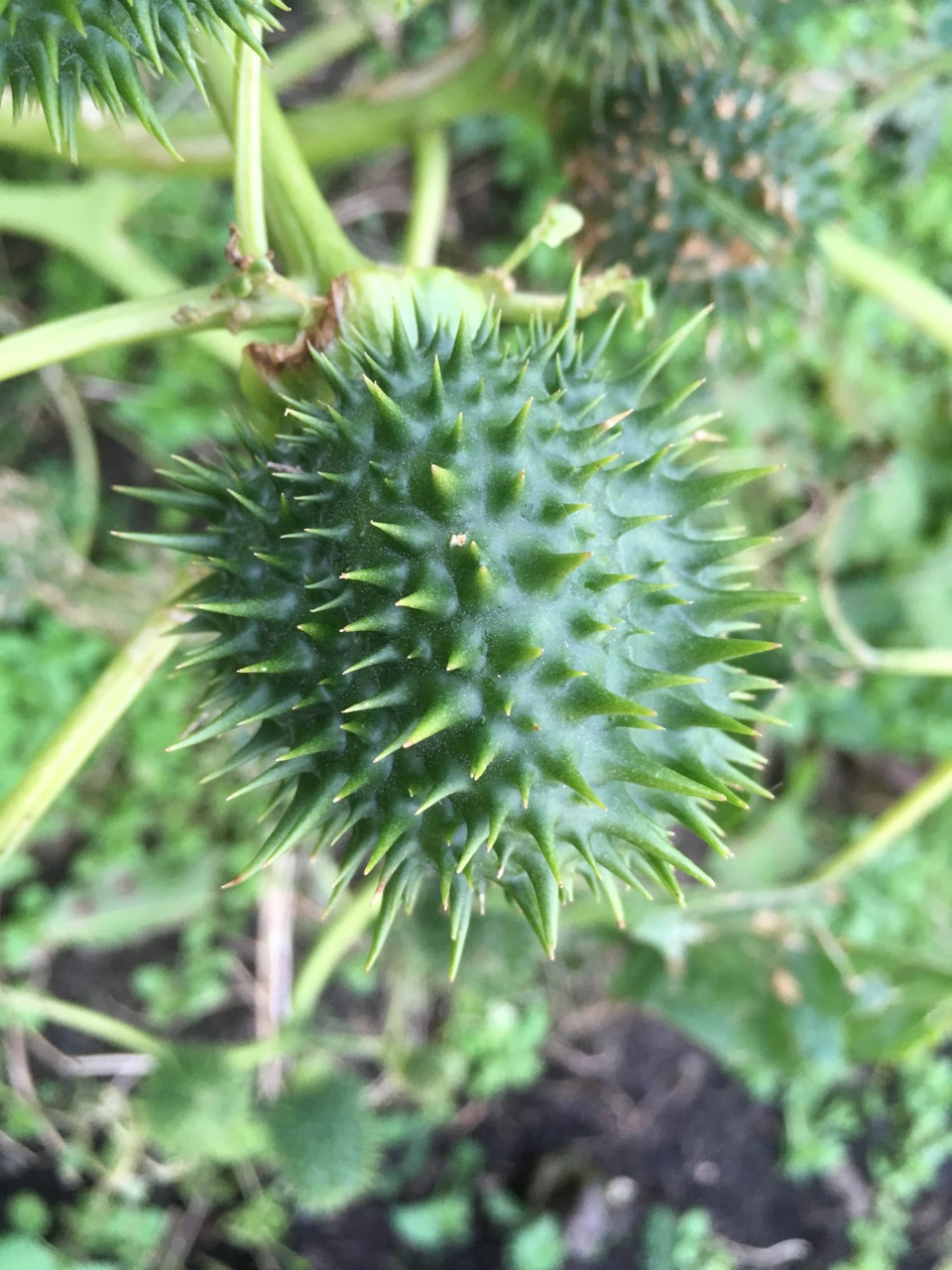
Jimsonweed seed capsule

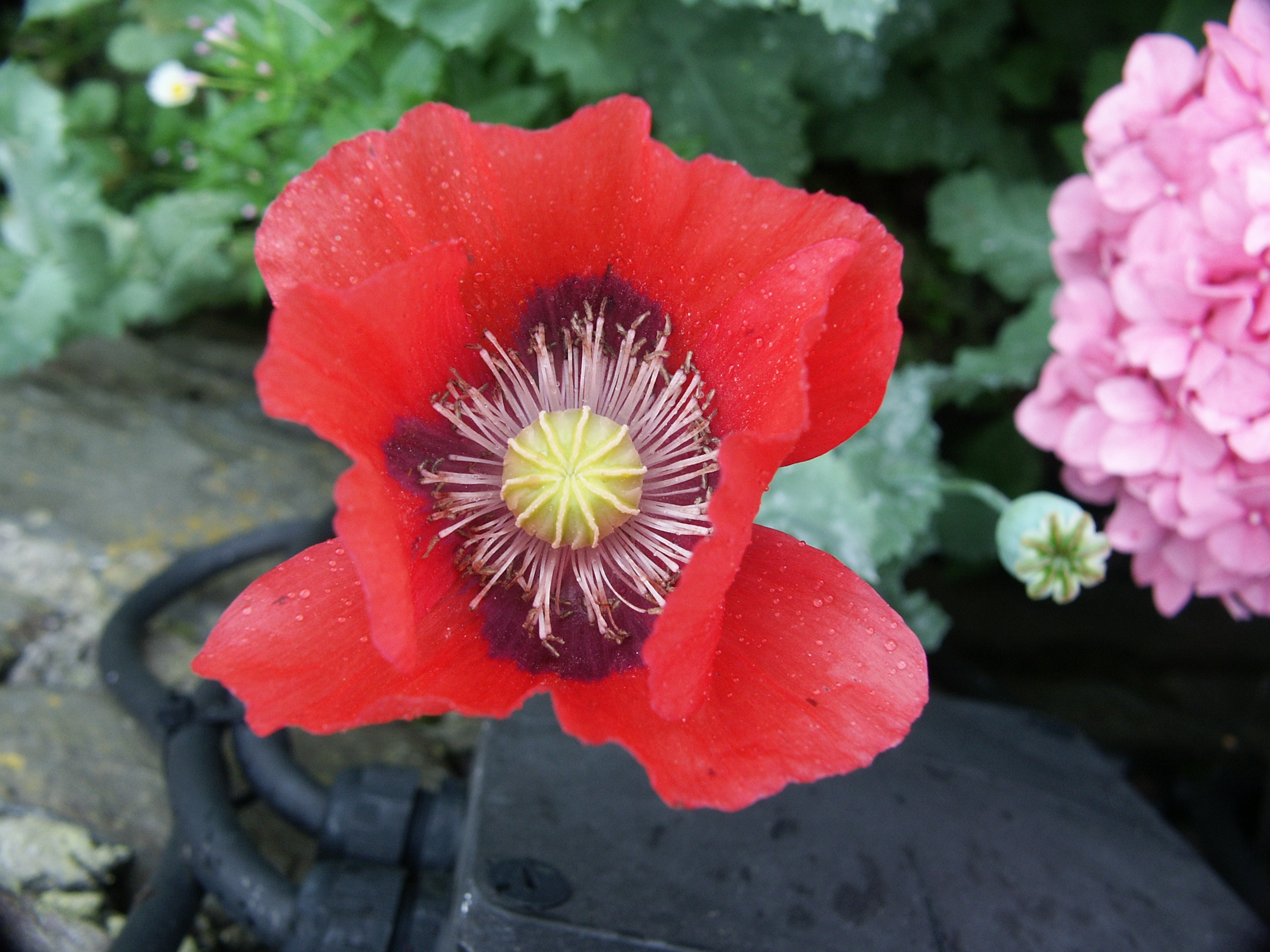
Opium poppy flower

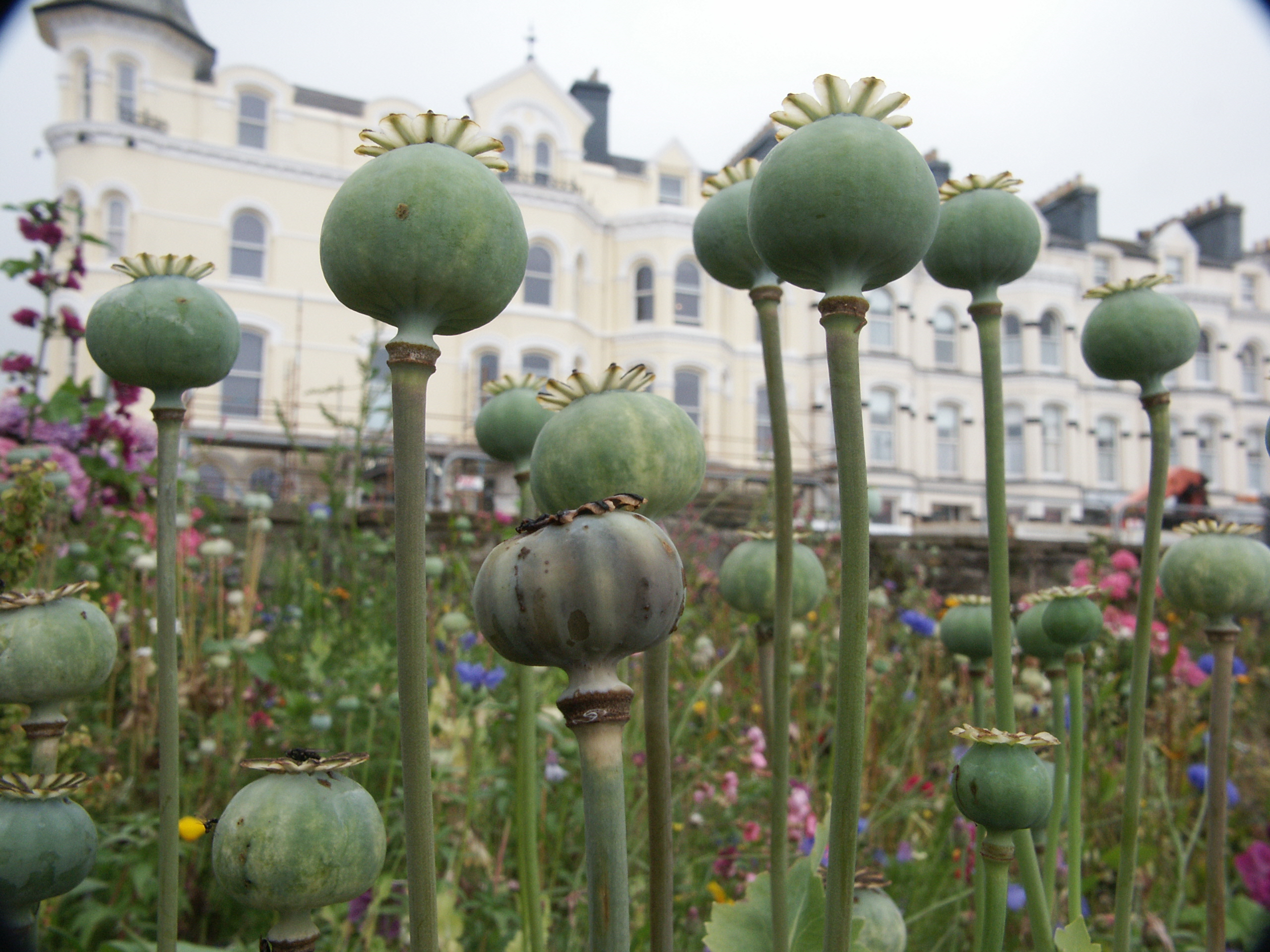
Opium poppy seed capsules

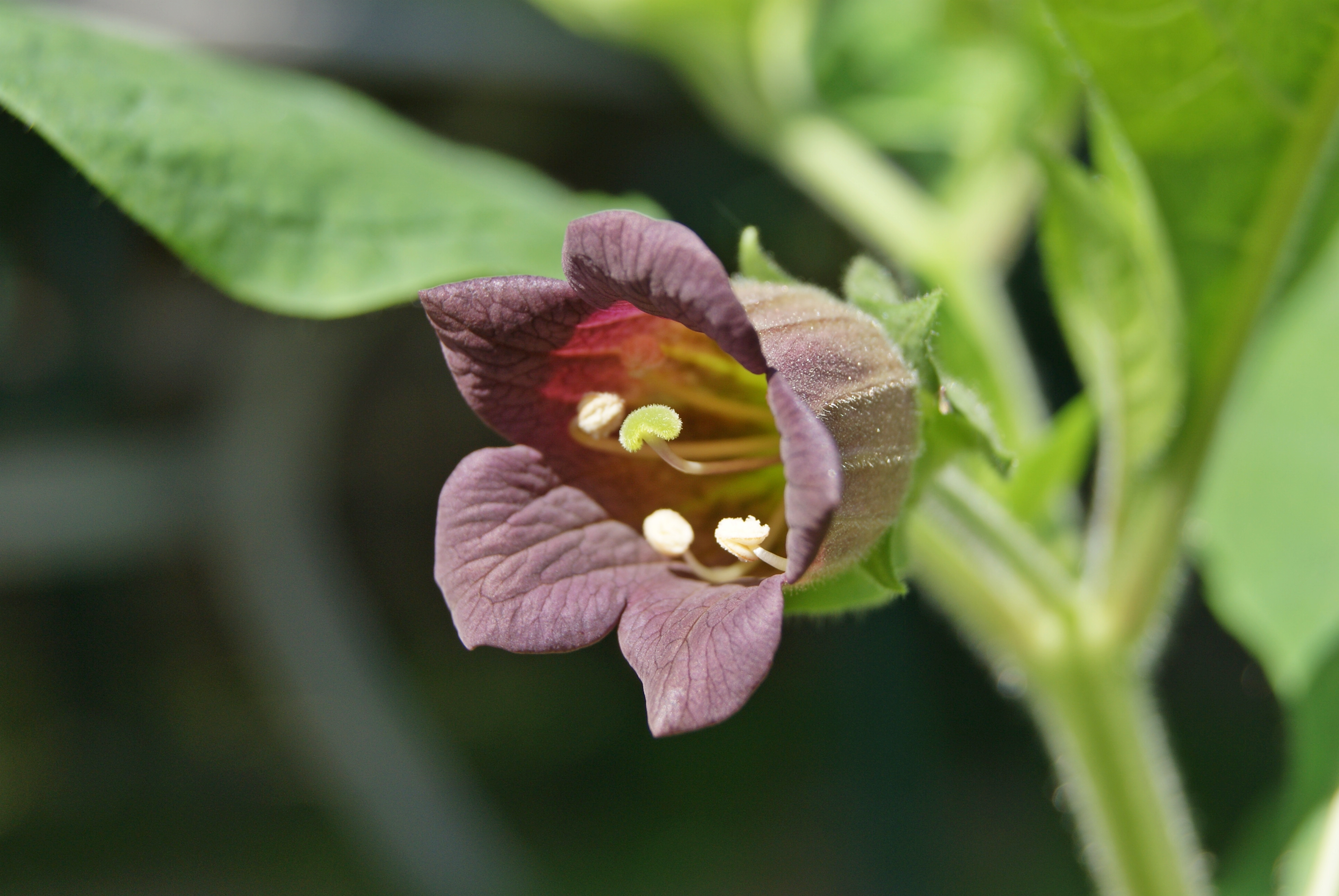
Deadly nightshade flower

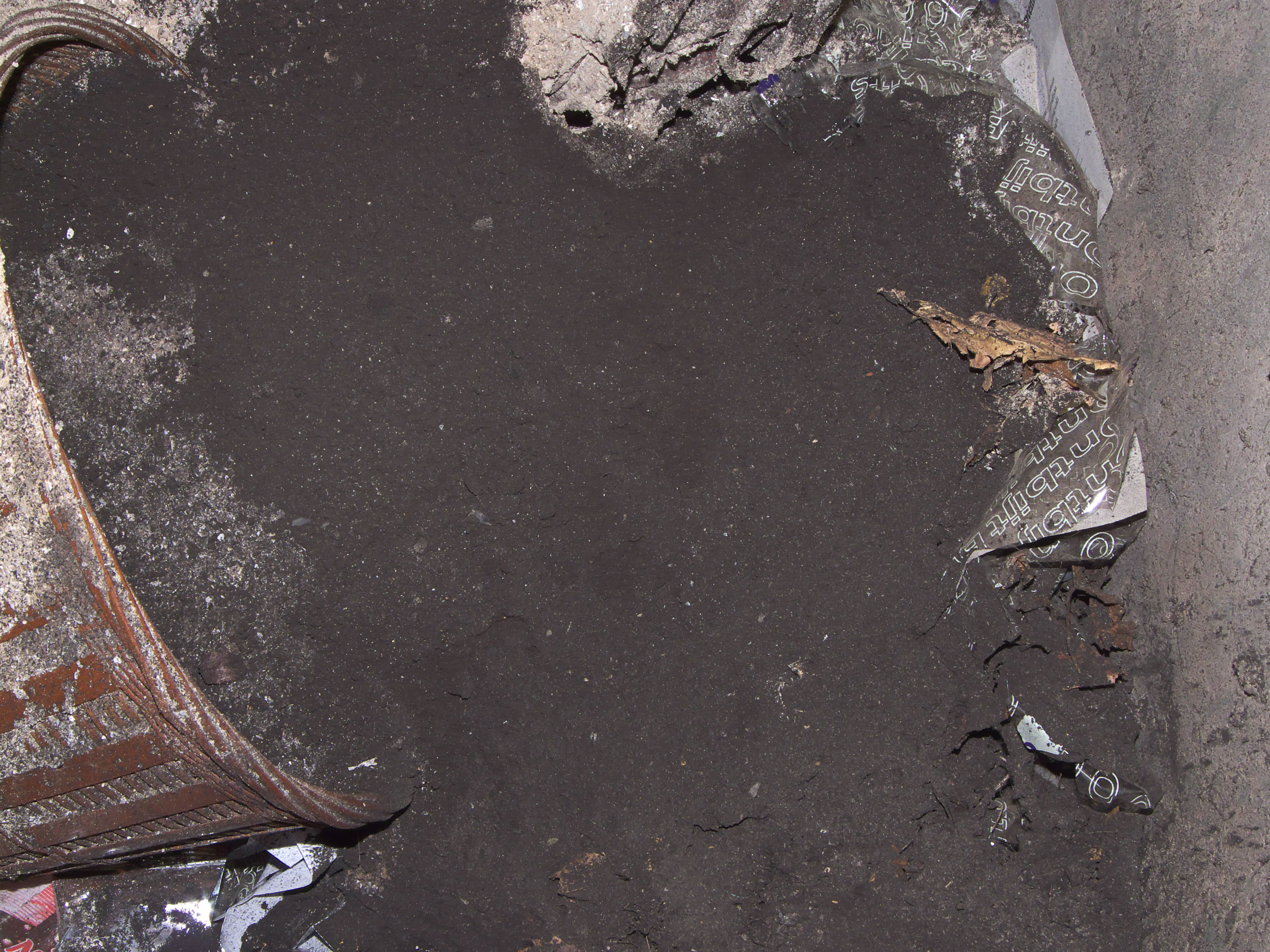
Domestic chimney soot

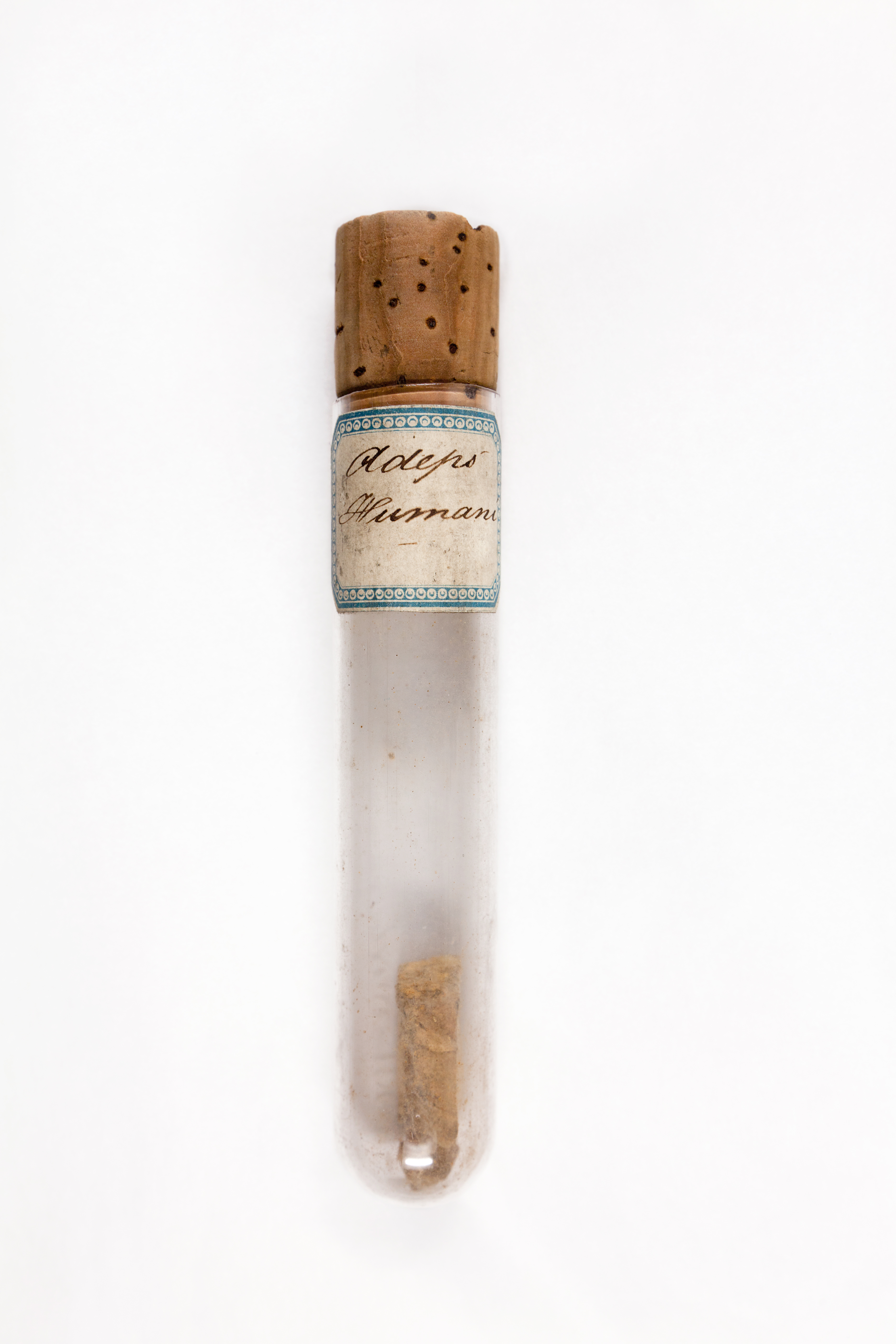
Human fat

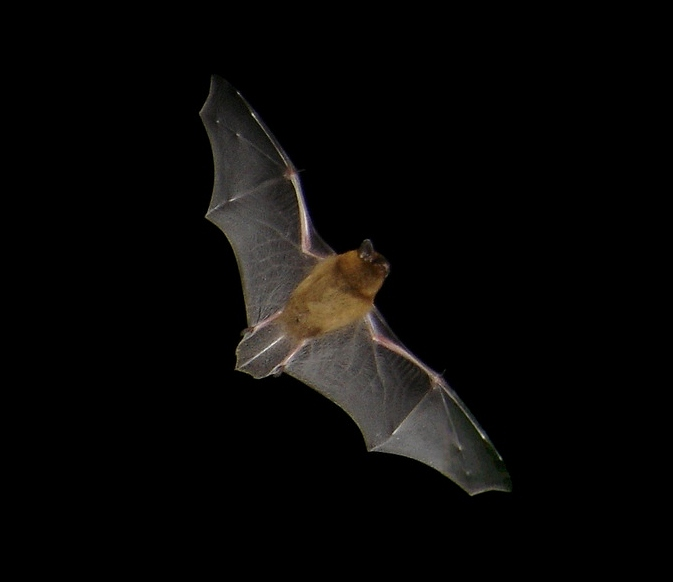
Common pipistrelle in flight (bat's blood)

== See also ==
- Besom
- Cunning folk
- Deliriants
- Hedgewitch
- Nightshades
- Stregheria
- Witches' Sabbath
- Johannes Hartlieb
- Will Erich Peuckert
