= Dealing with Dragons =

1990 book by Patricia Wrede

- Cover of first edition
- Author: Patricia C. Wrede
- Original title: "The Improper Princess" in Spaceships and Spells.
- Cover artist: Dalia Hartman (and others)
- Language: English
- Series: Enchanted Forest Chronicles
- Genre: Fantasy
- Publisher: Jane Yolen Books, Harcourt Brace Jovanovich
- Publication date: 1990
- Publication place: United States of America
- Media type: Paper
- Pages: 211
- ISBN: 0-15-222900-0
- OCLC: 20492360
- LC Class: Cataloging-in-Publication Data
- Preceded by: None.
- Followed by: Searching for Dragons

Dealing with Dragons is a middle grade fantasy novel written by Patricia C. Wrede, and is the first book in the Enchanted Forest Chronicles series. The novel chronicles the adventures of the princess Cimorene, who escapes her tediously ordinary family to become a dragon's princess. It received the 1991 Minnesota Book Award for Fantasy and Science Fiction.

== Plot summary ==
Princess Cimorene, frustrated with her life, persuades the castle staff to teach her fencing, magic, cooking, Latin, and other subjects deemed "improper" for princesses.

Whenever her parents discover these activities, they forbid her to continue learning and prohibit the staff member from teaching her further.

The King and Queen take Cimorene on a state visit to a neighboring kingdom, where she discovers their plan to marry her to the obnoxious Prince Therandil. Unable to bear the thought, Cimorene flees and encounters a group of dragons. She volunteers to be the "captive" princess of dragon Kazul, who assigns her to cook meals and organize the dragon’s library and treasure hoard.

Cimorene grows fond of her new life and befriends Kazul, though she must constantly fend off knights and princes attempting to "rescue" her. She places a sign on the road to the cave, hoping to deter potential rescuers.

While posting the sign, Cimorene encounters a wizard who, after being annoyed, departs using complex magic. Cimorene deduces he is a powerful wizard. Later, Kazul explains that dragons and wizards are in conflict over access to the Caves of Fire and Night. The wizards’ staves can absorb magic from nearby sources, including dragons.

Cimorene and Alliora, the princess of dragon Woraug, discover another wizard collecting herbs near the dragon caves. Cimorene brings a sample back to Kazul, who, panicking, immediately burns it. However, the smoke from the herb—identified as dragonsbane, a poison to dragons—makes Kazul ill. Kazul sends Cimorene to warn another dragon about the wizards’ dragonsbane collection, but it is too late: the King of the Dragons has already been fatally poisoned.

Despite Kazul’s lingering illness, Cimorene must compete in the trials to elect the next King of the Dragons (a title open to any gender). As she navigates the dragon caves on Kazul’s errands, she encounters a prince who has been turned into a living statue.

From the Stone Prince and Alliora, Cimorene learns that the wizards, with Woraug’s help, poisoned the King. The wizards intend to manipulate the trials to ensure Woraug wins the title, granting them access to the dragons’ Caves and magical treasures.

Alliora discovers a method to defeat wizards: soapy water mixed with lemon juice. Armed with this knowledge and aided by friends, Cimorene thwarts the wizards’ scheme. Meanwhile, Kazul emerges victorious in the trials and becomes the King of the Dragons.

== Reception ==
Reception to the novel has been positive. Kirkus Reviews called it "Smoothly written and ingenious fantasy", praising its non-stereotypical female protagonists. In 1991, Dealing With Dragons appeared on the ALA Best Book for Young Adults list (now ALA Best Fiction for Young Adults), the School Library Journal Best Book of the Year list, and the New York Public Library Best Book for the Teen Aged list.

Dealing With Dragons won the 1991 Minnesota Book Award for Fantasy and Science Fiction.

== Citation ==
- Wrede, Patricia C. Dealing with Dragons, Jane Yolen Books, 1990, OCLC 20492360 (1st edition). Published in the UK as Dragonsbane.
