= Shadow Magic (Wrede novel) =

1982 novel by Patricia Wrede

Shadow Magic is a 1982 novel written by Patricia Wrede.

== Plot summary ==
Shadow Magic is a novel in which the baron's daughter Alethia embarks on a quest both to discover her identity, and to reclaim the lost magical artifacts which once unified the kingdom and kept an ancient evil at bay. Kidnapped under the guise of political intrigue, she escapes and finds refuge among the Wyrds, a unique forest-dwelling race. As she journeys, she encounters the legendary Shee, the High Elves, and learns of her mother's exile from their ranks. Training in magic while evading enemy threats, she eventually uncovers the first artifact and plays a pivotal role in the kingdom’s decisive battle. In the end, she is recognized as the mistress of the artifacts and the rightful Queen.

== Reception ==
John T. Sapienza Jr. reviewed Shadow Magic for Different Worlds magazine and stated that "the author has an interesting insight into the nature of magic, which she defines as "the art of changing the relationships between things.' Her handling of magic should give any thoughtful gamemaster useful ideas to work with in devising magic for gaming."

== Reviews ==
- Review by Terry Broome (1990) in Paperback Inferno, #87
- Science Fiction Review 46 (1983-02)
