= Baraona =

- Municipality
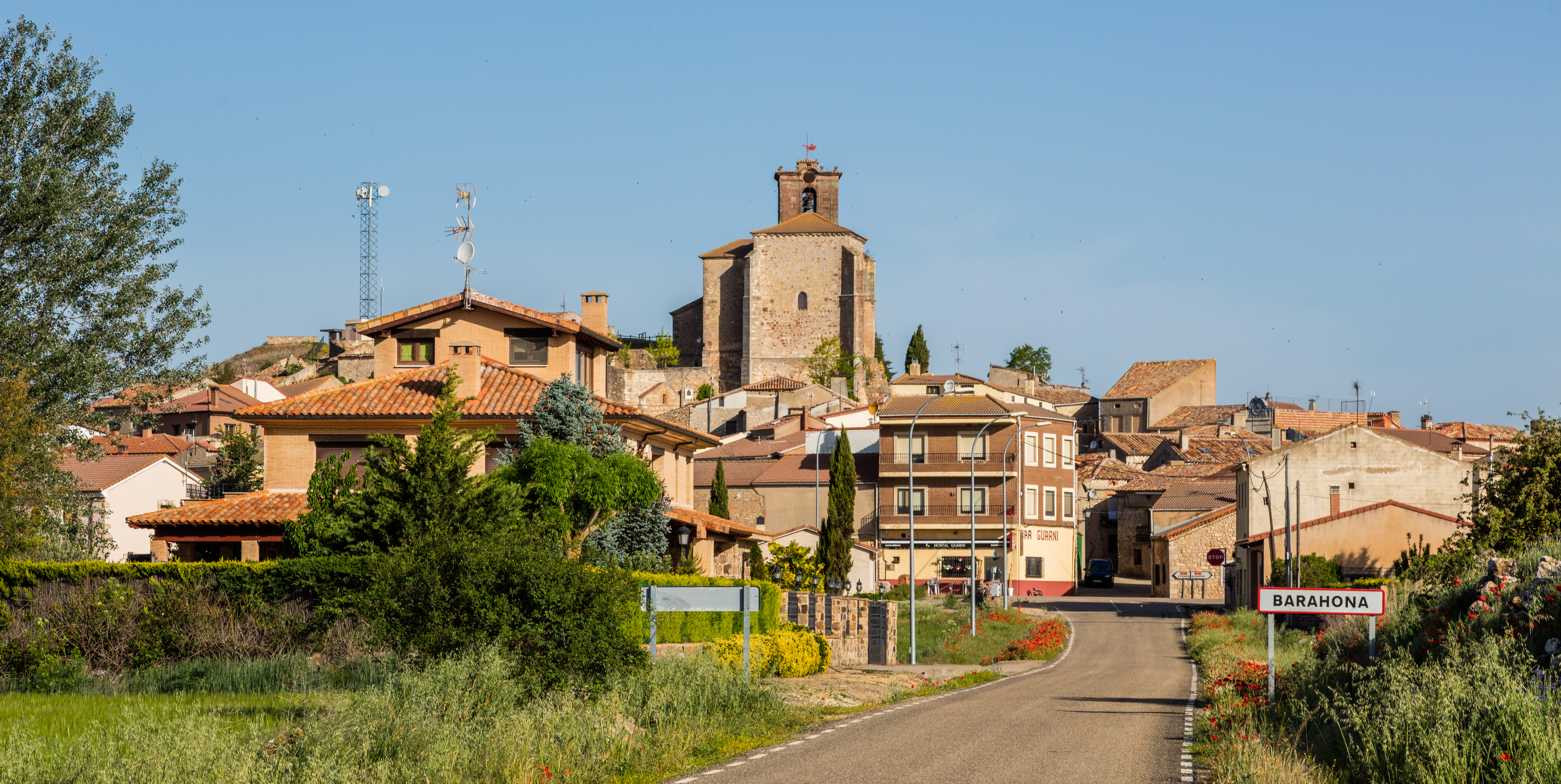

- Flag Coat of arms

- Location in Spain. Baraona (Spain)
- Country: Spain
- Autonomous community: Castile and León
- Province: Soria
- Municipality: Baraona

Area
  - Total: 116 km^{2} (45 sq mi)

Population (2025-01-01)
  - Total: 117
  - Density: 1.01/km^{2} (2.61/sq mi)
- Time zone: UTC+1 (CET)
  - Summer (DST): UTC+2 (CEST)
- Website: Official website

Baraona (alternative spelling Barahona) is a municipality located in the province of Soria, Castile and León, Spain. According to the 2004 census (INE), the municipality has a population of 211 inhabitants.

It was credited in Spanish folklore as being a site where an Akelarre or Witches' Sabbath was held regularly and, as such, was the subject of an inquisition in 1527 (as documented in the trials recorded in the Tribunal de la Inquisición de Cuenca) - the village has the alternative name Barahona de las Brujas (Barahona of the Witches). It is the site of the curious holed stone known as La Piedra de las Brujas or El Confesionario de las Brujas ("Witches' Stone" or "Witches' Confessional") which bears an incised cross - thought to sanctify a monolith deemed to have unhallowed associations.

Mention is made of the village's reputation as a well-known site of the Witches' Sabbath in the Spanish Golden Age play Lo que quería el Marqués de Villena ('What the Marquis of Villena wanted') by Francisco Rojas Zorilla (1607-1648) of Toledo. This takes the form of an exchange concerning the flying ointment between the eponymous Marquis and the character Zambapalo (= 'Yokel' ?)

The witchcraft associations of the village also form the subject of a late 20th century play by Spanish dramatist Domingo Miras (born 1934), entitled Las Brujas de Barahona ('The Witches of Baraona' ,1978).

== See also ==
- Mên-an-Tol
- Aghade Holed Stone
