= Talking to Dragons =

1985 novel by Patricia Wrede

Talking to Dragons is a middle grade fantasy novel, the fourth and final book in the Enchanted Forest Chronicles by Patricia Wrede, although it was published first, in 1985. It is told in first person from the point of view of sixteen-year-old Daystar, son of Cimorene, a woman who lives at the edge of the Enchanted Forest.

== Plot summary ==
Cimorene raises Daystar and tells him legends about the Enchanted Forest, swordsmanship, spells, and magical protocols. One day, Antorell, a member of the Society of Wizards who has a grudge against Cimorene, tries to attack them. Cimorene melts Antorell with a spell, which raises many questions in Daystar's mind; he didn't know that his mother could do any magic. However, Cimorene refuses to answer Daystar's questions, and goes into the Enchanted Forest to retrieve a sword, which she gives to Daystar. She then sends him into the forest telling him not to come back until he can tell her why he had to leave.

When Daystar enters the forest, he meets a talking golden lizard named Suz, who tells Daystar that the sword Cimorene gave him is the 'Sword of the Sleeping King.' Daystar, confused about what all this can mean, is instructed by Suz to "follow the sword." Trying to find a place to spend the night, he enters the middle of a ring of hedges and finds a young fire witch named Shiara, who can do fire magic but only sporadically, as it does not always work for her. She explains that the wizards heard about her lack of control and kidnapped her. However, she burned the Head Wizard's staff, ran away to the Enchanted Forest, and got caught in the middle of the hedges. Daystar tells Shiara about his quest, and she decides to accompany him. Afterwards, when Daystar shows Shiara his sword and they both touch it together, they feel a surprising jolt.

The next morning, the bushes let Daystar out but refuse to allow Shiara to leave until she asks nicely, which takes a lot of time as she is not in the habit of politeness. Afterwards, Daystar warns Shiara that she will need to be more polite to people and things in the future. Soon, Shiara apologizes for her rudeness. As they venture through the forest, a wizard who is after Shiara attacks them by making a river turn into a water monster, and although Shiara attempts to burn it, nothing happens. But suddenly, the wizard and monster disappear, leaving only the wizard's broken staff behind. A nearby elf tells Daystar to help himself to the staff, but Shiara soon realizes that the staff pieces turn the moss brown and dead, and when Daystar picks up the middle piece, it explodes, burning his arm in the process. Shiara tries to help him until a cat leads them both to the house of Morwen, a witch who lives inside of the Enchanted Forest. Morwen quickly heals Daystar, gives both Daystar and Shiara a bundle of food, and gives Shiara a kitten which Shiara names Nightwitch. Morwen tells them to travel up the river to find the castle that they are looking for.

As they travel up the river, they meet a princess who asks for Daystar's sword. The princess tells them that a wizard told her to take the sword to save a knight she loves. The wizard, who is Antorell, shows up and tries to attack Daystar. But he is interrupted when a dragon who is looking for a princess comes. Shiara offers the princess they just met to the Dragon. The princess fainted when she saw the dragon, but before the dragon can take her away, the princess's love shows up, and the knight, who does not want to fight the dragon, decide to have a tourney for fun, but in the middle of it a small tree pops up and surprises the dragon. In his surprise, the dragon accidentally hits the knight with his tail, which makes the princess hysterical. Daystar tells the princess to see Morwen for help. The dragon decides to travel with Shiara and Daystar and insists on leading them on a "shortcut" to the castle. As they pass through a clearing, an invisible wall stops them. Somehow, Shiara learns how to make things invisible from this, which causes her to panic. As the three pass the castle, an evil sorceress turns Shiara into stone. Daystar fights the sorceress, and she dies, but Shiara is still a stone. Suz shows up and suggests that Daystar kiss her, and although this works, it annoys Shiara. The castle in the meanwhile has somehow disappeared, and when they come to the next clearing, they find a strange tower-house that belongs to a magician named Telemain. After some misunderstandings, Telemain allows them to stay the night and advises them to travel through the Caves of Chance. When the group travels through the Caves, Daystar finds a small key, which a strange, jelly-like creature called a quozzel insists is its responsibility and confronts Daystar. At the end of the caves, the quozzel causes a cave-in that doesn't kill anyone, although Shiara's arm is broken. Daystar causes the quozzel to leave by hitting it with his sword and they escape with the help of several dwarves who keep calling Daystar 'Lord', much to his annoyance.

The adventurers arrive near the center of the forest, meeting the King of Dragons, Kazul, who explains that Daystar must find and save Mendanbar, the King of the Enchanted Forest, who has been trapped in his castle for about 16 years by the wizards; he has not been able to be rescued because of a shield the wizards made around the castle, and the dragons put up a shield around it as well to keep the wizards from doing more harm. When the dragons take down their shield protecting the castle, Daystar uses the sword to break the wizard's shield. The wizards show up and freeze Daystar with a spell, but Shiara hides and is spared, and when the wizards attempt to kill the king, they find out that the figure on the bed is a decoy, and several leave to find the king. The freezing spell soon wears off, and Daystar fights the wizards. Shiara sets Antorell on fire and Daystar sticks the sword into a brazier in the room, shouting a spell his mother taught him, which allows him to see the magical network of the forest and to use it to disable the wizards' ability to use the forest's magic, leaving the wizards with only stored spells and swords and enabling Daystar to throw the key into the fire. The king comes out, and when Daystar hands him his sword, he realizes that the king is his father, which makes Daystar the heir to the Enchanted Forest. Daystar and the others leave and find Morwen tending to a wounded Telemain. They later explained to Daystar what had happened during the first three books. The books end with Telemain and Morwen announcing their engagement.

== Differences between versions ==
The book was the first written of the four, as a standalone, but tweaked slightly for republication as the fourth and final chapter of the Enchanted Forest Chronicles. Small edits like typesetting, word order and slight rephrasings, and style formatting like extra paragraph breaks and avoidance of semicolons permeate the book. (The only major omission in the new version is the handful of illustrations from the original.) Aside from those:

Some major differences include large additions to the text for series mythology:

- Telemain's sesquipedalian loquaciousness
- the gargoyle in the study (which gets a whole page directing Daystar and Shiara to the right room)
- Willin the elf (half a page when Mendanbar first exits the castle, then additional pieces to keep the banquet in order)
- "in which"-type chapter names (the original had none)

and some small extra touches/hints for readers of the other three books:

- the quozzel's description of the wizard who left the key is heard and hints that it was Zemenar; the original only indicates that it doesn't match Antorell's
- Kazul herself had eaten Zemenar and hints at it earlier

Other changes for series mythology include

- "argelfraster" to trigger the wizard-melting spell (in the original Cimorene merely pointed)
- the single dragon that could perform the Colin's Stone task became King, not the oldest of several to do it
- Telemain called Kazul ahead on the magic mirror (in the original he "sent a spell")
- the nature of the sword, which originally was made for dealing with wizards and was used by the Kings of the Enchanted Forest, counteracting wizards' magic differently; in the new version, it was brought in line with what was established in previous books, such as Mendanbar being the only such King
- the key to the castle is downplayed in the original, but opens any door in the castle in the new mythology and has more text devoted to it
- the new version explicitly states that Mendanbar did not have to eat while prisoner
- the magic of the Enchanted Forest gets a little more description by the end (and the deterioration caused by wizards' staffs is adjusted from stems breaking to the dead powder); fire magic is slightly more fleshed out (when Shiara uses it on the invisible castle); the Prince of the Ruby Throne is described as a sorcerer, instead of a magician (although even in the original, Telemain was a magician and they were general-purpose)
- the new version includes one token jab at fairy-tale conventions the way the other three books do (about princes and glass coffins)

Parts of the original that are rather contradicted by the other three books, mostly mentioned at the end of the book (and, along with "argelfraster", the most likely things a reader of them might notice by reading the original version last):

- the beginning of Cimorene's life with the dragons is slightly different
- the sword, again, was anti-wizard from the start, with a longer history of rivalry over it
- Cimorene and Mendanbar's courtship was a little slower, and though they had gotten engaged soon enough, they married early specifically so Cimorene could help recover the sword, which was stolen earlier and kept in a tower
- Antorell's bitterness and vendetta against Cimorene also stemmed from her rebuffing his romantic advances!
- Cimorene did not know she was pregnant until much later, after the wizards' bubble went up (oddly, it is only in the original that Mendanbar immediately addresses Daystar by name)
- Zemenar was not the Head Wizard; in the new version, of course, he was, and after he was eaten it was the new Head Wizard who didn't tell Antorell what the sword was

In addition to the various other minor changes in wording, the new version is much more specific about things like heights, intervals of time, number and sexes of dwarves in the caves, Forest vegetation (most notably lilacs instead of plain bushes when the young dragon first appears), and Daystar's bodily struggles at the cave-in and final wizard fight by the brazier. It redefines a few bits of geography (of the Forest, the cave-in, the location of the Mountains of Morning) as well.

Finally, the last three words of the book are adjusted in perhaps a nod to the fairy tale themes of the others: "Smiling, I picked up the other two bundles and started after Shiara" becomes "...followed happily after".

== Reception ==
In a review of the novel's first edition, John C. Burnell of Dragon wrote that the novel "represents a kind of cheerful, exuberant fun that's as rare in AD&D® game campaigns as it is in fantasy novels, and both worlds should be suitably grateful for its existence as a reminder." Kirkus Reviews wrote that while the series is "getting a little formulaic", the characters and the "effervescent" dialogue "continue to charm." Celeste Steward of the School Library Journal wrote that the audiobook offers "sparkling dialogue, charming characters, and excellent sound quality."
