= Calling on Dragons =

1993 novel by Patricia Wrede

- First edition cover
- Author: Patricia C. Wrede
- Language: English
- Publication date: 1993

Calling on Dragons is a 1993 middle grade fantasy novel by Patricia C. Wrede, third in the Enchanted Forest Chronicles. The book was first released on March 1, 1993, under Harcourt Brace Jovanovich (HBJ), a publishing company. The book follows the main character, a witch named Morwen, and her companions as they set out on a quest to recover a stolen magical sword, which is crucial to protecting the Enchanted Forest. Along the way, they face mischievous magic, bumbling wizards, and a growing number of magical mishaps—most notably involving a giant, magic-fed rabbit named Killer.

== Plot summary ==
This novel is the third in the Enchanted Forest series, told from the witch Morwen's perspective.

Morwen, a witch who lives in the Enchanted Forest, is having trouble with people who believe that magic should follow traditional forms, specifically one Arona Michealear Grinogion Vamist.

Morwen's cats find a large rabbit named Killer as well as the burned-looking splotches that a wizard's staff leaves in the forest, despite the spell on the forest (established in the last book) that should prevent it. Morwen calls the magician Telemain to help, who mentions a wizard-melting spell he came up with. They then find the wizard Antorell (son of the Head wizard Zemanar), who is two inches tall, shrunken by his own spell, who tries to escape but is subdued by the cats and then melted by Telemain.

Morwen then finds that Killer has eaten one of the magical cabbages in her garden, and has turned into a donkey. (Throughout the story, Killer acquires additional spells and changes form.) Morwen and Telemain immediately go to the castle of King Mendanbar and Queen Cimorene, who is pregnant. At the castle, Mendanbar and Telemain discover that the sword at the heart of the forest's magic is stolen, allowing the wizards free rein in the forest. Morwen, Kazul (the King of Dragons), Telemain, Cimorene, Killer and two of Morwen's cats must undertake the journey to the headquarters of the Society of Wizards, who stole the sword. Mendanbar stays in the Enchanted Forest to guard against wizards.

Telemain teleports the group twice towards their destination. The next teleport fails and Telemain is unconscious. Killer carries Telemain as they make their way through a swamp. They find a tower occupied by a fire-witch, Brandel, who is there because Vamist chased his family out of their home. After Brandel lets them in, they use his magic mirror to try to contact Mendanbar but find that they cannot because of a problem at his end. Kazul decides to go home and find out what's happening. The next morning, again with Brandel's mirror, they find that the sword is not at the headquarters of the Society of Wizards as they assumed, but at the house of Vamist.

With the help of the cats, Morwen and Cimorene manage to recover the sword (they melt Antorell again). Telemain teleports them back to the forest and the group realize that they accidentally brought Vamist along. While they were gone, a battle has occurred between the dragons and wizards. The wizards encased the castle in a magical bubble and Mendanbar is missing, presumed inside the castle. As with the bubble shield spell in Searching for Dragons, the only way to break it is with the sword of the King of the Enchanted Forest, and the only one who can wield the sword is the King or his heir. Morwen and Telemain move the spells on Killer onto Vamist, returning the rabbit to his natural form. Cimorene hides the sword in the forest so the wizards cannot find it. The dragons put up a second bubble around the castle, which only they can take down so that the wizards can't enter the castle either. Cimorene takes her baby and hides in an outer region of the forest to wait until the baby is old enough to use the sword and rescue Mendanbar.

== Genre ==
Calling on Dragons is a young adult fantasy novel. It has most of the usual genre conventions, including a magical realm, fantasy creatures, and a coming-of-age quest. The novel is both humorous and laced with old-fashioned fantasy tropes. Its place as the third book in the Enchanted Forest Chronicles series solidifies its role in the young adult fantasy.

== Reception ==
Kirkus Reviews wrote that while the novel "has the most perfunctory of plots", it is "still good fun". Brian E. Wilson of the School Library Journal wrote that it "emerges as a fluffy romp that goes down easy, pleasing fans of the fractured fairytale genre", although he opined that Wrede "does stretch some jokes too thin".
