= Book of Enchantments =

Short story collection by Patricia Wrede (1996)

- Cover of the first edition
- Author: Patricia C. Wrede
- Cover artist: Amy Ning
- Language: English
- Genre: Fantasy short stories
- Publisher: Harcourt Brace
- Publication date: 1996
- Publication place: United States
- Media type: Print (hardcover)
- Pages: 234 pp.
- ISBN: 0-15-201255-9
- OCLC: 33161648
- LC Class: PZ7.W915 Bo 1996

Book of Enchantments is a collection of short stories written by American fantasy author Patricia C. Wrede. It was first published in hardcover by Harcourt Brace in 1996, and was subsequently issued in paperback by Point Fantasy in 1998 and in trade paperback by Magic Carpet Books in 2005. Five of the stories had appeared previously in the anthologies Liavek: The Players of Luck (Ace Books, 1986), edited by Will Shetterly and Emma Bull, The Unicorn Treasury (Doubleday, 1988), edited by Bruce Coville, Tales of the Witch World 3 (Tor Books, 1990), edited by Andre Norton, A Wizard's Dozen (Harcourt Brace, 1993), edited by Michael Stearns, and Black Thorn, White Rose (Morrow AvoNova, 1994), edited by Ellen Datlow and Terri Windling.

== Summary ==
The book collects ten fantasy stories by Wrede, together with a recipe associated with one of the stories and notes by the author concerning the inspiration of some of the stories. Two of the tales are set in the shared worlds of Will Shetterley and Emma Bull's Liavek ("Rikiki and the Wizard") and Andre Norton's Witch World ("The Sword-Seller"). Two stories ("The Princess, the Cat, and the Unicorn" and "Utensile Strength") are set in the world of Wrede's own Enchanted Forest Chronicles. Two ("Stronger than Time" and "The Lorelei") are retellings, or alternate versions of traditional fairy or folk tales. One ("Cruel Sisters") is based on a folk song, a variant of The Twa Sisters, that Wrede once heard performed by Loreena McKennitt as The Bonny Swans. McKennitt's change to a particular line ("and he had daughters, one, two three...") inspired Wrede to write the story from the third daughter's point of view.

== Contents ==
- "Rikiki and the Wizard"

A story about a successful wizard, who, seeking everlasting fame and wealth, offers his beautiful daughter in marriage to whichever god helps him achieve his goal. The god who answers is a blue chipmunk named Rikiki. Rikiki only wants to eats nuts, and while the wizard has no patience for him, his daughter feeds him some chestnuts. Rikiki, in gratitude for the daughter's kindness, gives her the ability to produce gold chestnuts from the empty chestnut bag. He also agrees to make the wizard famous forever. The gold chestnuts turn into real chestnuts when the wizard picks them up, as does everything else he touches. He soon becomes a laughingstock, unable to live down his reputation.

- "The Princess, the Cat, and the Unicorn"

Princess Elyssa's happy home life (i.e., a kind father, loving stepmother, and friendly stepsisters) is constantly disrupted by the King's councilors, who feel that things should be more traditional. The stepsisters should be jealous of each other, the stepmother biased and cruel. In order to annoy the councilors who make her life so difficult, Elyssa runs away (with her family's blessing) to seek her fortune by disguising herself as a maid in the castle of her stepmother's friend Queen Hildegard. On her journey she falls in with a talking cat, who leads her into the Enchanted Forest, claiming that Queen Hildegard is bossy and unpleasant. Elyssa is annoyed but decides to make the best of it. She comes across a pool of water but is prevented from drinking by the unicorn who guards it. Although the unicorn is angry at first, when he discovers Elyssa is a princess he wants her to stay with him and pamper him. When Elyssa refuses to stay in the clearing admiring the unicorn's beauty and making garlands for him to wear, the unicorn becomes angry and holds her there by magic. Although Elyssa walks away, she ends up back by the unicorn's pool. Ultimately she is able to escape by walking with her hand on the cat's back. The cat seems weakened by their escape and in her distress Elyssa kisses him on the nose. He turns into a handsome prince and explains that he was changed into a cat by Queen Hildegard when he refused to marry her daughter. Elyssa claims that he doesn't have to marry her just because it is traditional, but the prince says that he likes the idea of marrying Elyssa quite a lot. Elyssa likes the idea herself, so they get married and live happily ever after.

- "Roses by Moonlight"

A young woman named Adrian is bitter and jealous of her younger sister, Sam's, success, popularity, and looks. While avoiding Sam's party, she meets a woman who takes her to a garden of roses. Each rose contains a possible future for Adrian, success in work, love, failure, death, or continued bitterness against her sister. She finds one flower, only a bud, that shows her and Sam agreeing to work harder to get along. She is told she may pick just one flower, but she decides to forgo the garden and chose her own future. The woman and her garden vanish, and Adrian, still not wanting to go back to Sam's party, decides that there will always be time to talk to Sam tomorrow.

- "The Sixty-two Curses of Caliph Arenschadd"

The Caliph is a magician as well as a ruler, and notoriously quick-tempered. Rather than allow his occasional ire against those who serve him result in irreparable fatalities, he has devised a list of curses to serve in place of execution; the victims must figure out how to break the curses on their own. The Caliph's most-cursed servant is his long-suffering vizier, who has gotten further down the list than anyone else. To add insult to injury, when he is cursed, his whole family is cursed with him. The vizier's daughter narrates the result of the latest curse, which bids fair to be the worst of all—lycanthropy, for which there is no known cure. A nightly run by the light of the full moon is all well and good, but what will happen when she or her parents end up biting someone? Fortunately her best friend, a lad about the palace, comes up with a brilliant solution.

- "Earthwitch"

A king named Evan Rydingsword, whose land is threatened by a powerful enemy and torn apart by war, goes to ask the powerful Earthwitch, a person who channels the raw power of the Earth, for help. He arrives to discover that it is his old lover, Mariel, not a crone as he expected. Mariel left him 14 years ago because his ambition overpowered her, and she has served almost all of her seven-year term as the Earthwitch. Evan is proud, but years of war and leadership have made him a better man than he was, and he offers his life to the Earth in exchange for help for his people. The Earth complies, and causes the ground to open beneath his enemies and swallow them up. The price the Earth then demands of Evan is Mariel's life. He feels his sword pulling toward her, and rather than kill her, cuts off his own hand with his dagger. He awakes blind and crippled. Mariel tells him that he is no longer king, although his people defeated their enemy. He will be the Earthwitch after her, but once he has served his seven-year term, they may be able to be together, as "just Evan and Mariel," without any politics, power, or ambition to tear them apart.

- "The Sword-Seller"
- "The Lorelei"

The Lorelei is a retelling of the Scottish ballad Tam Lin. Janet, an American student, is on a school trip in Germany. Mechanical trouble with the tour bus forces the class to stay at a hotel on high cliffs overlooking the Rhine. Legend has it that the Lorelei, a Siren-like woman, used to sing from the cliffs and lure sailors to their doom on the rocks. Janet is unnerved by a statue of the Lorelei, and as the day wears on she becomes convinced that one of her male classmates is missing. However, since she is unable to prove her suspicions, Janet walks out to the cliffs where she hears faint music growing louder. She comes face to face with the Lorelei, who has taken someone from Janet's class, a boy named Dan. The Lorelei has been toying with Dan, allowing him to escape nearly to the road before calling him back to the cliffs with her singing. Janet covers Dan's ears which frees him from the Lorelei's power. When the Lorelei begins to ensnare Janet, Dan covers her ears, allowing them to break her power over them. The Lorelei commends Janet for her strength, and lets Janet and Dan return to the hotel.

- "Stronger Than Time"

Gray

- "Cruel Sisters"
- "Utensile Strength"

The monarchs of the Enchanted Forest are visited by an enchanter's son, bearing a most unusual implement—the Frying Pan of Doom. (His father had been trying for an enchanted sword, and been interrupted at a critical moment.) Their hope is that King Mendanbar and Queen Cimorene can figure out what to do with the thing. It is decided to hold a tournament with a bake-off appended in an effort to match up the weapon with the hero destined to wield it; since only the rightful wielder can handle the pan without an oven mitt, the idea is to grant it to the knight who can touch it without getting burned. Things go sour when an evil magician appears. He has tracked his niece, rightful heir to the kingdom he has usurped, to the Enchanted Forest, and demands her surrender. The attempt of one of the tournament knights to champion her is interrupted when the princess stands forth, unwilling for anyone to be harmed on her behalf (she has been hiding out incognito as a scullery maid, in true fairy tale fashion). To fend off her uncle she grabs the object nearest to hand, which turns out to be the frying pan, and beans him with it with ... interesting results. The rightful wielder having been found, a different prize must be found for the tournament champion, who turns out to be a barbarian with a killer recipe for Quick After-Battle Triple Chocolate Cake.

- "Quick After-Battle Triple Chocolate Cake" (recipe)

The aforesaid recipe, devised by the author especially for the book on the demand of her editor. Ingredients and their proportions are helpfully translated from the original barbarian into equivalents familiar to the reader.

- "Notes from the Author"

Background information on the pieces in the collection.
