= Patricia Wrede =

American fantasy author (born 1953)

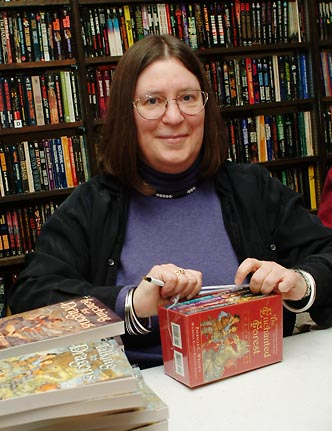
- Pat Wrede in 2004
- Born: March 27, 1953 (age 73); Chicago, Illinois, U.S.
- Education: Carleton College (BA); University of Minnesota (MBA)
- Occupation: Author
- Writing career
- Genres: Children's literature, fantasy and science fiction
- Notable work: Enchanted Forest Chronicles
- Website: www.pcwrede.com

Patricia Collins Wrede (/ˈriːdi/; born March 27, 1953) is an American author of fantasy literature. She is known for her Enchanted Forest Chronicles series for young adults, which was voted number 84 in NPR's 100 Best-Ever Teen Novels list.

== Career ==
Wrede graduated from Carleton College in 1974 with a BA in biology and obtained an MBA from the University of Minnesota in 1977. She finished her first book in 1978 while working as an accountant and financial analyst. She was a founding member of The Scribblies, along with Pamela Dean, Emma Bull, Will Shetterly, Steven Brust and Nate Bucklin, in January 1980, "to which [she] belonged for five extremely productive years." She sold her first book to Ace in April 1980 and it was published in 1982. In the fall of 1980, Wrede met Lillian Stewart Carl, who introduced her to Lois McMaster Bujold. In 1985, shortly before her fifth book was published, she became a full-time writer. She is a member of the Liavek shared-world anthology.

In 2009, Wrede donated her archive to the department of Rare Books and Special Collections at Northern Illinois University.

Lois McMaster Bujold credits the support of Wrede and Lillian Stewart Carl for allowing Bujold to finish her first novel: "These friendships were lifelines in every sense".

== Personal life ==
She was born in Chicago, Illinois, on March 27, 1953, to David Merrill and Monica Marie Collins. She is the eldest of five siblings. As a child, Wrede was a voracious reader and recalls "I don't think I ever read anything only once." She loved to tell stories to her family and friends and began writing in the seventh grade with much support from her parents. Patricia and James Wrede were married in 1976; they divorced in 1991. She is a pescatarian and lives in the Twin Cities with two cats.

== Books ==
=== Lyra ===
These books are all stand alone stories that are loosely connected and share a common setting on a world named Lyra. They are listed here in order of publication.

1. Shadow Magic (1982)
2. Daughter of Witches (1983)
3. The Harp of Imach Thyssel (1985)
4. Caught in Crystal (1987)
5. The Raven Ring (1994)
- Shadows over Lyra (omnibus edition containing Shadow Magic, Daughter of Witches, and The Harp of Imach Thyssel as well as two shorter pieces titled Perspectives on Early Lyran History: A Monograph and Timeline of Lyran History) (1997) (Illustrated by Anne Yvonne Gilbert)

The actual chronological order of the books is Caught in Crystal, The Raven Ring, Shadow Magic, Daughter of Witches, and The Harp of Imach Thyssel. The last three are set in the same time period but different nations while the first two are spaced widely apart chronologically and happen well before the events of the last three. A timeline and short world history at the end of Shadows over Lyra ties everything together and answers a lot of questions.

The omnibus edition of Shadow Magic is a revised one; the writing is significantly different from that in the original, and reflects her greater experience as a writer. It seems that Wrede rewrote the story for the omnibus, but this is not actually noted anywhere in the book itself.

=== The Enchanted Forest Chronicles ===
This series features Princess Cimorene, as she becomes a dragon's princess, rescues said dragon, falls in love, and ultimately saves the enchanted forest.

1. Dealing with Dragons (1990)
2. Searching for Dragons (1991)
3. Calling on Dragons (1993)
4. Talking to Dragons (1985, revised 1995)
- Enchanted Forest Chronicles (1995) (omnibus edition containing all four novels)

=== Cecelia and Kate ===
with Caroline Stevermer

The authors tell these stories from the first-person perspectives of cousins Kate and Cecelia (and, in the third book, two additional characters), who recount their adventures in magic and polite society. The first book is an epistolary novel. Unusually, it was written by the two authors exchanging letters with each other for the alternating sections, but never discussing the plot (the "Letter Game").

1. Sorcery and Cecelia or The Enchanted Chocolate Pot: Being the Correspondence of Two Young Ladies of Quality Regarding Various Magical Scandals in London and the Country (1988, reprinted 2003)
2. The Grand Tour or The Purloined Coronation Regalia: Being a Revelation of Matters of High Confidentiality and Greatest Importance, Including Extracts from the Intimate Diary of a Noblewoman and the Sworn Testimony of a Lady of Quality (2004)
3. The Mislaid Magician or Ten Years After: Being the Private Correspondence Between Two Prominent Families Regarding a Scandal Touching the Highest Levels of Government and the Security of the Realm (2006)
- Magic Below Stairs (2010). This installment was written by Caroline Stevermer alone and is set in the same universe. Although published in 2010, the events take place after The Grand Tour but before The Mislaid Magician. It follows the character of Frederick Lincoln as a child in the house of the Schofields.
- Magicians of Quality (2005) (omnibus edition containing Sorcery and Cecelia and The Grand Tour).

=== Magic and Malice ===
"Mairelon" is a gentleman wizard with unusual talents, and Kim is his streetwise protégée. Together, they foil plots and generally get into trouble. From a reference to the date being thirty years since the Terror, the novels take place about 1823, during the Regency era in its broader sense; however, the author has personally stated that the events of Magician's Ward take place in 1818.

1. Mairelon the Magician (1991)
2. Magician's Ward (1997)
- Magic & Malice (1999) (hardcover omnibus edition containing both novels)
- A Matter of Magic (2010) (trade paperback omnibus edition containing both novels).

=== Frontier Magic ===
A trilogy narrated by Eff Rothmer, the "thirteenth child" of the opening book title. Book One covers her childhood, from the age of five (when her parents move west to the edge of the expanding American frontier) to shortly after her eighteenth birthday. Books Two and Three deal with an adult Eff's work as an explorer, scientist, and magician beyond the edge of the frontier.

1. Thirteenth Child (2009)
2. Across the Great Barrier (2011)
3. The Far West (2012)

=== Others ===
- The Seven Towers (1984)
- Snow White and Rose Red (1989)
- Book of Enchantments (1996)
- Star Wars, Episode I – The Phantom Menace (Junior Novelization) (1999)
- Star Wars, Episode II – Attack of the Clones (Junior Novelization) (2002)
- Star Wars, Episode III – Revenge of the Sith (Junior Novelization) (2005)
- The Dark Lord's Daughter (2023)

The Seven Towers is a stand-alone fantasy novel. Snow White and Rose Red is a fairytale fantasy retelling of the Brothers Grimm fairy tale "Snow White and Rose Red" (a different story than "Snow White") set in Elizabethan England, and including elements of the Thomas the Rhymer ballad.
