= Searching for Dragons =

1991 novel by Patricia Wrede

Searching for Dragons is a middle grade fantasy novel by Patricia Wrede, second in the Enchanted Forest Chronicles, about a young princess who lives with dragons and leads an unusual life. The book was also published in the UK in 1994 under the name Dragon Search.

== Plot summary ==
Mendanbar, the young King of the Enchanted Forest, is puzzled about several burned spots where he found dragon scales, but, more significantly, he finds that the magical network that keeps the forest alive is mysteriously missing in every one of the burned spots. Acting on the advice of a talking squirrel, Mendanbar goes to visit the witch Morwen, who says that the dragon scales are from one dragon but have been enchanted to look like they came from different dragons.

Mendanbar leaves to visit Kazul, the King of the Dragons, to get an ID on the dragon from which the scales came. When Mendanbar arrives, he finds Kazul's princess/assistant Cimorene at the cave but Kazul away. After Mendanbar gets over his preconceived notions about "empty-headed princesses" (having run into one himself earlier that day), Cimorene is able to identify the scales as coming from Woraug, a dragon who had conspired with wizards to make himself King and had been turned into a toad for his un-dragonlike behavior.

Mendanbar and Cimorene then find Antorell, the son of Head Wizard of the Society of Wizards Zemenar, trying to sneak into Kazul's cave. Antorell, not knowing that Mendanbar is present, says that the King of the Enchanted Forest is preparing for war with the dragons. Mendanbar then fights Antorell, Cimorene eventually melting him by pouring a bucket of soapy water with lemon juice all over him. Cimorene then tells Mendanbar that Kazul has been in the north negotiating with Frost Giants, but is overdue coming home, and that Mendanbar had interrupted Cimorene right when she had been about to leave to begin searching for Kazul. Mendanbar refuses to allow Cimorene to travel alone, on the grounds that she will be traveling through part of the Enchanted Forest, and Mendanbar, as the king of the Enchanted Forest, knows how dangerous that is.

Mendanbar and Cimorene travel to Flat Top Mountain to borrow a magic carpet from the giantess Ballimore, an acquaintance of Kazul. This succeeds, but troubles with the magic carpet force them down near the house of the dwarf Herman. Using one of the enchanted windows that Herman has in his house, Cimorene and Mendanbar discover that Kazul is being held captive by wizards in the Enchanted Forest. They immediately use Mendanbar's sword, a powerful magical implement that is intimately linked to the Enchanted Forest, to try to teleport back, but a problem with the spell dumps them in an unconnected ravine—also creating a small replica of the Enchanted Forest with the sword's magic.

Mendanbar pulls the magic out of the replica and into the sword, thus unmaking the replica, and they meet Telemain, a magician who tells them that the charm on their magic carpet is wearing thin and recommends Gypsy Jack's for repair. Mendenbar is the only person who can understand Telemain. At Gypsy Jack's, they leave the carpet after meeting a wizard whose staff they capture but who gets away himself. They transport back to the Enchanted Forest—this time successfully—and go to the palace. On the way, they find that a wizard's staff will absorb all the magic from an area of the Enchanted Forest, thus leaving the area looking burned—just like Mendanbar had seen at the beginning of the book.

At the palace, they find out where the wizards are and plan an expedition to the cave in which Kazul is being held. They fight briefly with the wizards and win, but they find that Kazul is still encased in the glowing bubble that imprisons her. Mendanbar ruptures the bubble with his sword, which absorbs wizards' magic, and frees Kazul. After going back to the castle, Mendanbar proposes to Cimorene, and they marry at the end of the story. Telemain also moves into the Enchanted Forest and sets up a magical spell that causes the magic of the forest to automatically get sucked out of the wizard's staffs if they attempt to steal the magic.

== Reception ==
Kirkus Reviews wrote that the novel is "as sprightly as the original" with "wry" twists that "are both fun and funny". Celeste Steward of the School Library Journal praised the audiobook's "perfect" pacing and "superb" delivery, highlighting the performances of Mike Dirksen and Lauren Singer.
