= The Dark Crystal: Age of Resistance =

American dark fantasy/adventure television series

- Genre: Fantasy-adventure
- Based on: Characters by Jim Henson
- Developed by: Jeffrey Addiss; Will Matthews
- Showrunners: Jeffrey Addiss; Will Matthews
- Directed by: Louis Leterrier
- Starring: Warrick Brownlow-Pike; Dave Chapman; Kevin Clash; Alice Dinnean; Damian Farrell; Louise Gold; Beccy Henderson; Helena Smee; Katherine Smee; Neil Sterenberg; Victor Yerrid
- Voices of: Taron Egerton; Anya Taylor-Joy; Nathalie Emmanuel; Shazad Latif; Harris Dickinson; Simon Pegg; Mark Hamill; Jason Isaacs; Benedict Wong; Donna Kimball; Caitriona Balfe; Gugu Mbatha-Raw; Andy Samberg; Helena Bonham Carter
- Narrated by: Sigourney Weaver
- Composers: Daniel Pemberton; Samuel Sim
- Country of origin: United States
- Original language: English
- No. of seasons: 1
- No. of episodes: 10

Production
- Executive producers: Louis Leterrier; Jeffrey Addiss; Javier Grillo-Marxuach; Lisa Henson; Will Matthews; Halle Stanford
- Producer: Ritamarie Peruggi
- Running time: 46–61 minutes
- Production company: The Jim Henson Company
- Budget: $97.7 million

Original release
- Network: Netflix
- Release: August 30, 2019

The Dark Crystal: Age of Resistance is an American television series produced by The Jim Henson Company. It is a prequel to the 1982 Jim Henson film The Dark Crystal that explores the world of Thra created for the original film. It follows the story of three young Gelflings (Rian, Deet, and Brea) as they journey together on a quest to unite the Gelfling clans to rise against the tyrannical Skeksis and save their planet Thra from a destructive blight known as the Darkening. The series premiered on August 30, 2019, to critical acclaim. In September 2020, it was announced that the series had been cancelled after one season.

== Premise ==
On the planet Thra, three Gelflings (Rian, Brea, and Deet) inspire a rebellion after discovering a horrifying secret behind their customarily worshipped rulers, the Skeksis, that threatens their entire planet.

== Cast ==
=== Main cast ===
==== Resistance ====
Character	Puppeteer	Voice
Rian	Neil Sterenberg	Taron Egerton
Brea	Alice Dinnean	Anya Taylor-Joy
Deet	Beccy Henderson	Nathalie Emmanuel
Aughra	Kevin Clash	Donna Kimball
Gurjin	Dave Chapman	Harris Dickinson
Seladon	Helena Smee	Gugu Mbatha-Raw
Tavra	Neil Sterenberg	Caitriona Balfe
Hup	Victor Yerrid	Victor Yerrid
Kylan	Victor Yerrid	Shazad Latif
Naia	Beccy Henderson	Hannah John-Kamen
All-Maudra Mayrin	Louise Gold	Helena Bonham Carter

==== Skeksis ====
Character	Puppeteer	Voice
The Emperor (skekSo)	Dave Chapman	Jason Isaacs
The Chamberlain (skekSil)	Warrick Brownlow-Pike; Katherine Smee	Simon Pegg
The General (skekVar)	Kevin Clash; Katherine Smee	Benedict Wong
The Scientist (skekTek)	Olly Taylor	Mark Hamill
The Ritual-Master (skekZok)	Victor Yerrid	Keegan-Michael Key
The Collector (skekLach)	Helena Smee	Awkwafina
The Gourmand (skekAyuk)	Louise Gold	Harvey Fierstein
The Ornamentalist (skekEkt)	Alice Dinnean	Alice Dinnean
The Scroll Keeper (skekOk)	Neil Sterenberg	Neil Sterenberg
The Hunter (skekMal)	Kevin Clash; Nick Kellington	Ralph Ineson
The Heretic (skekGra)	Damian Farrell; Barnaby Dixon	Andy Samberg

=== Supporting cast ===
==== Gelfling ====
Character	Puppeteer	Voice
Cadia	Olly Taylor	Eddie Izzard
The Librarian	Kevin Clash	Toby Jones
Daudran	Olly Taylor	Dustin Demri-Burns
Maudra Fara/The Rock Singer	Alice Dinnean	Lena Headey
Mira	Helena Smee	Alicia Vikander
Onica	Louise Gold	Natalie Dormer
Ordon	Dave Chapman	Mark Strong
Rek’yr	Olly Taylor	Theo James
Lath’N	Warrick Brownlow-Pike	James Dreyfus
Mitjan	Victor Yerrid	Charlie Condou
Maudra Argot/The Shadow Bender	Louise Gold	Louise Gold
Maudra Seethi/The Skin Painter	Beccy Henderson	Kemi-Bo Jacobs
Maudra Mera	Neil Sterenberg	Nina Sosanya
Maudra Laesid/The Blue Stone Healer	Warrick Brownlow-Pike	Nimmy March
Maudra Ethri	Louise Gold	Beccy Henderson
Bobb’N	Alice Dinnean	Beccy Henderson
Juni	Beccy Henderson	April Hughes
Red Haired Paladin	Warrick Brownlow-Pike	Warrick Brownlow-Pike

==== urRu/Mystics ====
Character	Puppeteer	Voice
urVa/The Archer	Olly Taylor	Ólafur Darri Ólafsson
urGoh/The Wanderer	Olly Taylor	Bill Hader

==== Others ====
Character	Puppeteer	Voice
Baffi	Dave Goelz	Dave Goelz
Lore	Damian Farrell	
Vliste-Staba (the Sanctuary Tree)		Theo Ogundipe
The Myth Speaker/Narrator		Sigourney Weaver
Gruenaks	Kevin Clash; Neil Sterenberg	Kevin Clash; Neil Sterenberg
Podling Servants	Warrick Brownlow-Pike; Louise Gold	Warrick Brownlow-Pike; Louise Gold
Core	Katherine Smee	
Garthim	Daniel Dewhirst	

Additional voices by Warrick Brownlow-Pike, Dave Chapman, Stewart Clarke, Kevin Clash, Alice Dinnean, Barbara Drennan, Damian Farrell, Louise Gold, Beccy Henderson, Isabella Laughland, Omar Malik, Sarah Beck Mather, Jack Myers, Mark Restuccia, Irfan Samji, Helena Smee, Katherine Smee, Neil Sterenberg, Olly Taylor, and Victor Yerrid.

Additional puppeteers included; Don Austen, Sue Beattie, Mikey Brett, Sarah Burgess, Carl Chadd, Sheila Clark, Marcus Clarke, Richard Coombs, Ronnie Le Drew, Phil Eason, Phil Fletcher, Lesa Gillespie, Andy Heath, Sarah-Jane Honeywell, Steven Kynman, Steve Nallon, Angie Passmore, Colin Purves, Andrew Spooner, Victoria Willing, and Michael Winsor, amongst others.

== Episodes ==
No.	Title	Directed by	Written by	Original release date
1	"End. Begin. All the Same."	Louis Leterrier	Jeffrey Addiss & Will Matthews	August 30, 2019
A millennium has passed since Mother Aughra entrusted the Crystal of Truth to the alien Skeksis, who siphon its lifeforce to maintain eternal youth while proclaiming themselves Thra's rulers. The corrupted Dark Crystal begins to cease giving its energy away, with the Skeksis emperor skekSo ordering his scientist skekTek to devise an alternative means. skekTek accidentally learns to use the Crystal to siphon other beings' essence for the Skeksis to reinvigorate themselves. Following a suggestion from skekSil, he abducts the Crystal Guard Gelfling Mira during her search for an Arathim in the catacombs, resulting in her death as the Skeksis feast on most of her essence. This act is witnessed by Mira's boyfriend Rian, who escapes them. Meanwhile, Princess Brea of Ha'rar uncovers a symbol after questioning the Skeksis' laws following Ha'rar's tribute to skekOk and skekLach. Deet, of the Grottan Clan, is chosen by the Sanctuary Tree and embarks on a mission to save Thra from being consumed by the Darkening, the Crystal's corruption.
2	"Nothing Is Simple Anymore"	Louis Leterrier	J.M. Lee	August 30, 2019
As Aughra awakens upon sensing a calamity on Thra, Deet experiences the surface before gaining a traveling companion in the Podling Hup as they journey to Ha'rar. Brea visits Elder Cadia of the Sifa Clan for help deciphering the symbol's meaning. Cadia instead attempts to wipe out Brea's memory by having her drink powdered nulroot, only for her to switch the drinks at the last second. Cadia's apprentice Onica offers her services if Brea brings her the All-Maudra’s brightest jewel by tomorrow night. Back in the Castle, labeled a murderer, Rian uses dreamfasting to reveal Mira's death to their friend Gurjin. The two then resolve to steal the vial of Mira's essence as additional proof of the Skeksis' misdeeds. The two manage to acquire it when skekTek catches skekSil stealing it, but the two Skeksis capture Gurjin while Rian escapes with the vial. skekTek reports this to skekSo before skekSil spins the story so that The Scientist is blamed for Rian's escape. The Crystal Guard are sent after Rian, and skekTek is subjected to the eye-gouging Peeper Beetle as punishment.
3	"What Was Sundered and Undone"	Louis Leterrier	Vivian Lee	August 30, 2019
Deet and Hup find themselves unwelcome in the Stonewood clan's village, with Hup arrested while defending Deet's honor. Deet is denied from seeing Maudra Fara to appeal for Hup's freedom, while Fara and Ordon attempt to capture Rian before he escapes them. Rian and Deet encounter each other after nightfall, with the latter inspired by Rian with a scheme to free Hup. Meanwhile, as skekSil provides skekTek with Gruenak assistants, Aughra arrives at the Castle and confronts the Skeksis, who banish her from their domain, but not before she learns of the Crystal's corruption. Brea is sent to join the Order of Lesser Service for one year as punishment for the diplomatic incident she caused by wiping out Cadia's memories. Brea escapes the Order while they are cleaning Podlings, encountering Tavra who reveals that their mother sent her on a mission to retrieve Rian. She then returns to Ha'rar and acquires her mother's brightest jewel for Onica—an Unamoth chrysalis. With Onica's guidance, Brea asks the chrysalis for answers and follows the newly emerged Unamoth to a secret passage beneath her mother's throne.
4	"The First Thing I Remember Is Fire"	Louis Leterrier	Simon Racioppa & Richard Elliott	August 30, 2019
Deet frees Hup from the Stonewood clan's dungeon by pretending to be a monster that scares the guards. In Ha'rar, Brea attempts to decipher the hidden chamber's riddle before realizing it reveals the Gelfling clan hierarchy to be false while awakening a stone giant that plays a recording on its body. The voice introduces the giant as Lore who will guide her to the Circle of the Suns, attracting the attention of Brea's oldest sister Seladon. Meanwhile, Aughra encounters urVa The Archer who advises her to learn from Thra to restore her connection to the planet. At the same time, the Skeksis' banquet in honor of skekEkt's return turns sour when skekSo replaces skekSil as his advisor with skekVar. This leads skekSil to summon skekMal The Hunter to retrieve Rian. As skekVar and skekZok leave to recruit "volunteers" from the Gelfling tribes, skekMal finds Rian after he dreamfasted the truth to Tavra, Ordon, Gurjin's sister Naia, and Kylan. skekMal survives Ordon's sacrificial attempt to stop him with ravenous Gobbles and then runs off with Rian as Deet and Hup watch.
5	"She Knows All the Secrets"	Louis Leterrier	Jeffrey Addiss & Will Matthews	August 30, 2019
skekSil convinces skekMal to let him take Rian back to the Castle, only for Rian to be saved by Naia and a freed Gurjin while Tavra remains in the Castle. In Ha'rar, skekVar and skekZok gather seven volunteers under the guise of recruits for a new Arathim rebellion. The All-Maudra is convinced by Brea to meet Lore, while Seladon encounters Hup and a disguised Deet who have infiltrated the Citadel. At the Sanctuary Tree, Aughra eventually realizes that she must listen to Thra to hear its song again and succeeds, with Rian's group, the All-Maudra, Brea, Deet, and Seladon all ending up in the Dream Space while dreamfasting. While forced to send Seladon back the physical world due to her blind faith in the Skeksis, Aughra reveals their actions against Thra and rallies the gathered Gelflings to stop them. The All-Maudra confronts the Skeksis and is killed by skekVar, with a bereaved Seladon allowing the Skeksis to take the "traitors" away as her first decree as the new All-Maudra.
6	"By Gelfling Hand ..."	Louis Leterrier	Kari Drake	August 30, 2019
skekVar and skekZok are impeded by Rian's group while en route to the Castle, losing their prisoners when Lore catches up to their carriage. Rian convinces the Paladins to spread the word of the Skeksis' misdeeds. The Crystal Guard stages a rebellion that is swiftly put down: they are caged and drained, with Tavra among the captured. The Skeksis decide to attack Stone-in-the-Wood after an astonished skekSil returns and reveals that the Stonewood clan have turned on them. urVa learns from Aughra that his destiny is to confront skekMal, whose defeat requires a sacrifice. In Ha'rar, after sending the Living Crown pieces to the other Maudras to gather for her coronation and cremating her mother for "treason," Seladon finds herself challenged by Fara for the All-Maudra title. Seladon responds by renouncing the Living Crown and donning Skeksis-inspired regalia while declaring herself All-Maudra by the Skeksis' will. Fara and Laesid leave while the others bow to her. At the Crystal Sea after a night of mourning, Rian's group are met by a Dousan clansman named Rek'yr who takes Rian, Deet, Brea, and Hup to the Circle of the Suns while the others leave to rally their clans.
7	"Time to Make ... My Move"	Louis Leterrier	Javier Grillo-Marxuach	August 30, 2019
Rian's group reach the Circle of the Suns where they encounter a Skeksis named skekGra The Heretic and his Mystic counterpart urGoh The Wanderer. skekGra and urGoh gradually reveal their races' origins as the splintered urSkeks with the Darkening a byproduct of the Crystal's corruption. They announce their desire to merge back into their unified form GraGoh and need the Gelflings' help in using the Dual Glaive (a legendary weapon) to end the Skeksis' rule. Before Rian's group can set out to the Caves of Grot where the Dual Glaive is located, they are attacked by skekMal who escapes with Brea after being mortally wounded by his Mystic counterpart urVa. Meanwhile, keeping secret the fact that the Caves have been compromised by the Darkening, skekSo wins the Arathim Ascendancy's services by giving them back their ancestral home if they help put down the Stonewood Gelflings. The Ascendancy requests Tavra as a host for their mind-controlling Arathim, which take over the Stonewood as they are preparing for battle and have them march to the Castle.
8	"Prophets Don't Know Everything"	Louis Leterrier	Simon Racioppa & Richard Elliott	August 30, 2019
Rian and Deet travel through the Breath of Thra, thermal vents from the planet's core, to reach the Caves of Grot to find the Dual Glaive, but find the caves taken over by the Arathim with Deet's family and Maudra Argot among those under their control. When the Arathim are attacked by the berserk Nurloc and Rian and Deet reveal to them the Skeksis tricked them, Rian and Deet convince the Ascendancy to join them against the Skeksis while getting them and Deet's family to the surface. Before the Nurloc destroy it, the Sanctuary Tree gives Deet the power to extract the Darkening from others. Meanwhile, after ignoring Aughra's attempt to reason with her, Seladon travels to the Castle to beseech the Skeksis for mercy to the Stonewood. But she instead learns the truth from Skeksis themselves and is captured as a mortally-wounded skekMal returns to the Castle with Brea. The Skeksis panic as skekSo orders for skekMal's life to be saved at any cost and Aughra states that she now knows what she must do.
9	"The Crystal Calls"	Louis Leterrier	Margaret Dunlap	August 30, 2019
Rian and Deet acquire one half of the Dual Glaive from Maudra Argot, who hid it within her walking stick. They learn that Ordon had hidden the other half at Stone-in-the-Wood's crucible. At the Castle, skekOk suggests having the other Skeksis recalled to the castle. Aughra offers her essence to revive skekMal in exchange for the captive Gelflings' freedom. Though skekSo accepts, he orders skekVar to kill the prisoners before they leave. Now permanently joined with the Ascendancy, Tavra reveals the Arathim-Gelfling alliance and injures skekVar before being fatally wounded by skekSil. He wins skekVar's loyalty by giving him a vial of essence to heal himself with. When it appears that Aughra's essence was not enough to prevent skekMal's death, skekSil proposes to the other Skeksis that they should create an obedient army from Arathim corpses. Tavra later dies in the presence of her sisters. Rian reunites the Dual Glaive and issues a call to arms, calling all Geflings to meet at Stone-in-the-Wood. Hearing through the Crystal and threatening retaliation, skekSo orders an attack at dawn to stop the Rebellion before it can begin.
10	"A Single Piece Was Lost"	Louis Leterrier	Jeffrey Addiss & Will Matthews	August 30, 2019
Rian and Deet are joined by Brea's group while waiting for the other clans' arrival. skekSo calls upon the Darkening before leading the Skeksis to battle, ordering skekTek to remain at the Castle to work on the new army. Once the Skeksis arrive, skekSil sets up skekVar to fail in a duel with Rian and covertly kills him as the battle commences. skekMal is revealed to be alive as he shatters the Dual Glaive, only to be killed for good when urVa jumps off from the Circle of Suns, causing Aughra to be reconstituted out of his crumbling body. While events in Stone-in-the-Wood unfold, skekTek kills the rebelling Gruenaks in a moment of frustrated rage. When the other clans arrive, skekSo unleashes the Darkening, which Deet rebounds to kill skekLach while the other Skeksis retreat. As Brea finds the lost shard of the Crystal in the Dual Glaive's broken hilt, Deet leaves the group in fear of her power. An inspired skekTek then grafts one of the dead Gruenaks with the Arathim corpse, with the Skeksis introduced to the newly animated Garthim.

All episode titles are quotes from the original 1982 film.

A feature-length documentary, The Crystal Calls – Making The Dark Crystal: Age of Resistance, was released on Netflix on August 30, 2019. It was directed by Randall Lobb and features interviews with the cast, including Egerton, Dormer and Pegg.

== Production ==
=== Pre-production ===
Initially conceived as a feature-length sequel to The Dark Crystal titled The Power of the Dark Crystal, the project was for years in a state of development hell. In 2012, director Louis Leterrier expressed an interest in joining Jim Henson Productions in their project shortly after the release of Clash of the Titans, hoping to interest large studios, but was repeatedly turned down as, according to him, they were only interested in Transformers, and many executives had never heard of The Dark Crystal. It was during this impasse that Leterrier decided to shoot a prequel series rather than a film sequel because of the richness of material available in Jim Henson and Frank Oz's notes on the events leading up to the original film. Lisa Henson identified the "Wall of Destiny" from the original film as a "jumping point": "What was that culture? What was lost? What was that beautiful Gelfling civilization?" Jeff Addiss, Will Matthews and Javier Grillo Marxuach, all fans of The Dark Crystal, were subsequently hired as writers. The project was eventually sold to Netflix after Leterrier found a studio executive who shared the team's enthusiasm for the original film.

The production was pitched to Netflix as an animated prequel series. Upon hearing the idea, Vice President of Original Content Cindy Holland rewatched the film and asked about the possibility of doing the series in live-action, much to the Henson Company's surprise. A short test film, featuring a puppet Skeksis and a CGI Gelfling, was produced in 2016 to test potential improvements the series could have over the film. Ultimately, the test convinced the Henson Company and Netflix that the series needed puppet characters.

=== Development ===
In May 2017, it was announced that The Jim Henson Company, in association with Netflix, would produce a prequel to the film The Dark Crystal. The series, written by Jeffrey Addiss, Will Matthews, and Javier Grillo-Marxuach, began filming in the United Kingdom in November 2017 with Louis Leterrier serving as director. Addiss and Matthews serve as showrunners for the series.

At New York Comic Con in 2018, Leterrier insisted that the series would depend on puppetry and not CGI, except for the use of green screens to remove puppeteers. On December 17, 2018, the 36th anniversary of the original film's release, the voice cast was revealed, as well as some images of the main Gelfling characters. On May 30, 2019, Netflix released a teaser trailer and poster for the series, announcing its official release date on August 30, 2019. Additional voice actors were announced on June 26, including Awkwafina, Lena Headey, Hannah John-Kamen, Sigourney Weaver and Benedict Wong. Similar to the original film, voiceovers for the series were recorded after the bulk of filming was done, with the voice actors having to match their performances to both the lip movements and scratch track voices of the puppeteers.

=== Design ===
The puppets were fabricated in early 2017 in Jim Henson's Creature Shop in Los Angeles, then exported to Langley Studios just outside London, with The Muppets veteran Dave Goelz and The Dark Crystal's concept artist Brian Froud participating in performing and designing the characters. Aside from Froud's new sketches, the original film's tie-in book, The World of the Dark Crystal, was used as a reference point. Other sources of inspiration in building the world of Thra included Game of Thrones and Avatar: The Last Airbender.

According to design supervisor Toby Froud (who played the baby Toby in Labyrinth), the show makes use of 20 principal puppets, with an additional 90 for secondary roles. Unlike the original film, the Gelfling puppets require only two puppeteers, as opposed to four in The Dark Crystal, thus permitting greater freedom of movement. Also, while the animatronic components of the original film's Gelfling puppets were controlled via cables, the mechanical parts of the new Gelflings were remotely operated via a modified Wii controller.

== Marketing ==
On May 30, 2019, the first teaser trailer for the series was released and received a generally favorable response with Tasha Robinson, writing for The Verge, writing, "what's most compelling about this trailer, though, is the stunning fidelity to the original film".

== Reception ==
On review aggregator website Rotten Tomatoes, the series has an 89% rating with an average score of 8.6/10, based on 79 reviews. The website's critical consensus reads, "An epic fantasy adventure that will please old and new fans alike, Age of Resistance expertly builds on the lore of The Dark Crystal, crafting compelling new mythos without losing sight of the humanity at the story's heart." On Metacritic, the series has a weighted average score of 82 out of 100, based on 20 critics.

In a positive review for RogerEbert.com, critic Matt Fagerholm referred to the series as "quite simply, one of the all-time great fantasy epics, as well as the masterwork of puppetry most closely aligned with Jim Henson’s humanistic philosophy since his son Brian helmed 1992’s holiday perennial, The Muppet Christmas Carol". Matt Zoller Seitz of Vulture similarly praised the series, saying: "Age of Resistance is like an immense, ten-hour magic show, engrossing down to the very last wondrous detail. This is an altogether staggering artistic achievement, and a joyful continuation of the Henson tradition."

In a mostly positive review, Keith Phipps of TV Guide stated that "Age of Resistance is, in many respects, an extraordinary accomplishment. Which isn't to say it doesn't run into some problems along the way." In a more mixed review for The Daily Telegraph, Ed Power wrote, "There are real pleasures to be had watching beautiful puppets running, kissing and poking each others' eyes out. But the Dark Crystal is in such a hurry to create a splash it plunges off the deep end too soon."

== Accolades ==
Award	Date of ceremony	Category	Recipient	Result	Ref.
Critics' Choice Television Awards	January 12, 2020	Best Animated Series	The Dark Crystal: Age of Resistance	Nominated	
Golden Reel Awards	January 19, 2020	Outstanding Achievement in Sound Editing: Episodic Long Form-Sound Effects and Foley	Tim Nielsen (supervising sound editor, sound designer), David Farmer (sound designer), Andre Zweers, Jonathan Borland, Addison Teague, Lee Gilmore (sound effects editors), Shelley Roden, John Roesch (Foley artists) and Anthony De Francesco (Foley editor) for the episode "What Was Sundered And Undone"	Nominated	
Primetime Emmy Awards	September 19, 2020	Outstanding Children's Program	Lisa Henson, Halle Stanford, Louis Leterrier, (executive producers) Jeffrey Addiss, Will Matthews, Javier Grillo-Marxuach, Blanca Lista (co-executive producers) and Ritamarie Peruggi (produced by)	Won (Note: Tied with We Are the Dream: The Kids of the Oakland MLK Oratorical Fest.)	
Visual Effects Society Awards	January 29, 2020	Outstanding Special (Practical) Effects in a Photoreal or Animated Project	Sean Mathiesen, Jon Savage, Toby Froud and Phil Harvey (for "She Knows All the Secrets")	Won	
Visual Effects Society Awards	January 29, 2020	Outstanding Created Environment in an Episode, Commercial, or Real-Time Project	Sulé Bryan, Charles Chorein, Christian Waite and Martyn Hawkins (for "The Endless Forest")	Nominated	
Writers Guild of America Awards	February 1, 2020	Children's Script – Episodic, Long form and Specials	Javier Grillo-Marxuach (writer) for the episode "Time to Make...My Move"	Nominated	
Saturn Awards	October 26, 2021	Best Fantasy Television Series	The Dark Crystal: Age of Resistance	Nominated	

== Video game ==
During a Nintendo Direct at E3 2019, it was announced that a video game based on the Netflix series, called The Dark Crystal: Age of Resistance Tactics, was in development by BonusXP and En Masse Entertainment. The game was released on February 4, 2020, for Nintendo Switch, Xbox One, PlayStation 4, Microsoft Windows, and macOS. It was released in Japan on May 7, 2020.

== Future ==
On September 2, 2019, IndieWire reported that Addiss and Matthews were interested in and prepared for a possible second season: in an interview, Matthews said, "If we are lucky enough to get more seasons then the story will go on and we know where it's going and it's maybe more hopeful than you might think", with Addiss noting, "We also have a concrete document for season two. So we are ready to go."

However, on September 20, 2020, it was announced that the series would not be renewed for a second season. Lisa Henson stated, "We know fans are eager to learn how this chapter of The Dark Crystal saga concludes and we'll look for ways to tell that story in the future."

On February 10, 2022, TV Head of The Jim Henson Company Halle Stanford stated "We are nimble, we are resilient. We are ready to jump. The minute anyone would like to jump back into Thra [“The Dark Crystal” planet setting], it is a world that we will continue to build on and think about."

== Soundtrack ==
Varèse Sarabande (Music.Film) issued 2 Soundtracks sets for the series in September 2019: "The Dark Crystal: Age of Resistance, Vol. 1 Music from the Netflix Original Series," and Vol. 2 of the same name. Volume 1 is a 2-disc set, and Volume 2 is 1-disc.
