= David Buck =

English actor (1936–1989)

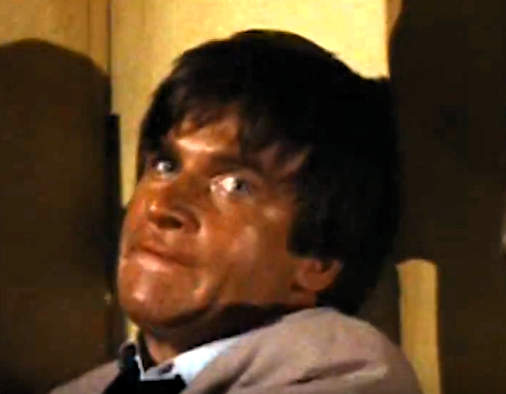
- Buck in The Mummy's Shroud (1967)
- Born: David Keith Rodney Buck; 17 October 1936; London, England
- Died: 27 January 1989 (aged 52); Esher, Surrey, England
- Occupation: Actor
- Years active: 1959–1989
- Spouse: Madeline Smith (m. 1988)
- Children: 1

David Keith Rodney Buck (17 October 1936 – 27 January 1989) was an English actor and author.

== Biography ==
David Keith Rodney Buck was born on 17 October 1936 in London, the son of Joseph Buck and Enid Marguerite (née Webb). He starred in many television productions from 1959 until 1989. One of his earlier roles was that of Horatio Hornblower in an episode entitled "Hornblower" (1963), in the Alcoa Premiere TV series.

He played Winston Smith in Theatre 625: The World of George Orwell: 1984 (1965), a remake of Nigel Kneale's adaptation of the novel. In the first two series of the ITV horror and supernatural anthology series Mystery and Imagination (1966–68) he played the series narrator Richard Beckett (from Sheridan Le Fanu's story "The Flying Dragon") whose character also became involved in some of the other stories adapted. His film career included roles in Dr. Syn, Alias the Scarecrow (1963), The Sandwich Man (1966), the Hammer film The Mummy's Shroud (1967), Deadfall (1968) and Taste of Excitement (1970). He also had a role as Royal Air Force Squadron Leader David "Scotty" Scott in the film Mosquito Squadron (1969), with David McCallum, in which his character is shot down during a low-level bombing raid over Northern France in 1944 and assumed killed.

Later, he was a voice actor for the films The Lord of the Rings (1978), for which he provided the voice of Gimli, and The Dark Crystal (1982), where he voiced SkekNa the Slave Master. Buck portrayed Dr. Watson in the 1978 BBC Radio 4 series of 13 Sherlock Holmes short stories.

Buck died of cancer in 1989. At the time of his death, he was married to the actress Madeline Smith, who featured in the film version of Up Pompeii (1971) and numerous comedy programmes in the 1970s.

== The Small Adventures of Dog ==
In 1968, William Heinemann published a 'funny and off-beat' children's book written and illustrated by Buck entitled The Small Adventures of Dog. He later claimed to have written the book in 'few days'. Buck presented his stories for the children's show Jackanory in April, 1971.

== Filmography ==
Year	Title	Role	Notes
1963	Dr. Syn, Alias the Scarecrow	Harry Banks	
1966	The Sandwich Man	Steven Mansfield	
1967	The Mummy's Shroud	Paul Preston	
1968	Deadfall	Salinas	
1969	Mosquito Squadron	Sqn. Ldr. David "Scotty" Scott	
1969	Taste of Excitement	Paul Hedley	
1978	The Lord of the Rings	Gimli	Voice
1980	Lady Killers	Percival Clarke	Episode - Murder at the Savoy Hotel
1982	The Dark Crystal	Slave Master	Voice
