= Legends of the Dark Crystal =

OEL manga series

- Cover of Jim Henson's Legends of the Dark Crystal vol. 1 (2007), art by Heidi Arnhold
- Genre: Fantasy; Based on The Dark Crystal
- Author: Barbara Kesel
- Illustrator: Heidi Arnhold, Max Kim
- Publisher: Madman Entertainment; Tokyopop
- Original run: 2007–2010
- Volumes: 2

Legends of the Dark Crystal is an original English-language manga published by Tokyopop, based on the 1982 Jim Henson fantasy film The Dark Crystal. It's written by Barbara Randall Kesel and illustrated by Heidi Arnhold and Max Kim.

The story is a prequel, set several centuries before the film, about two Gelflings, Lahr, a herder and musician, and Neffi, a weaver, who put up a resistance against the oppressive Skeksis, and their destructive army of giants, the Garthim. Three volumes were planned. The second volume was released in August 2010, but the third volume has been cancelled.

== Plot ==
=== Volume 1: The Garthim Wars ===
Lahr is in a field with his pet, Whouf, and his herd of Mounders, when he spots a herd of Garthim heading for his village. He runs to the village, but the Garthim have already destroyed it and captured all the villagers. A Garthim tries to capture Lahr, and ends up breaking his flute. In a fit of rage, Lahr stabs the Garthim with his flute, and it dies. Lahr has just killed a Garthim, a feat once thought to be impossible. Lahr leaves the village.

In the forest, Lahr meets a female Gelfling named Neffi, who was a weaver. She and Lahr have a dreamfasting, where Gelflings exchange memories through touch, and Lahr sees that Neffi witnessed her village being attacked by Garthim. She realizes that they're on the warpath, and she needs to warn the other Gelfling villages. She decides to join Lahr.

Lahr and Neffi soon reach the Namopo Valley, where a secret Gelfling village lies secure in a maze of canyons. Lahr tells them what he's seen, and they must decide whether to retreat or fight the Garthim. Neffi plays a game with some Gelfling children where they get tangled up in a thread of yarn and can't break it. She realizes that a net is stronger than its fibers, and gets an idea. The elders of a village decide to cast a vote to leave or stay.

Meanwhile, back at the Dark Castle where the Skeksis live, Emperor SkekSo is worried that the supply of Gelfling essence is running out. General SkekVar, who is in charge of the Garthim army, assures him that's not true. While they're debating, SkekSo starts choking, and SkekVar almost grabs the Scepter of Office, a symbol of the Skeksis emperorship, while SkekSo chokes. This was a test of loyalty, however, and SkekSo is suspicious that SkekVar tried to grab it. SkekVar begs for forgiveness, and SkekSo says he's forgiven the incident, but asks him to cooperate with SkekLach with his Gelfling collecting.

Chamberlain SkekSil, who is eavesdropping, thinks that SkekSo is becoming paranoid, and believes he can take advantage of this. This foreshadows his actions in the film to usurp SkekSo's throne following his death. Like in the film, SkekSil has a tendency to say "Hmmm" often.

Back in Namopo Valley, the village elders have finished their vote. While they're counting, however, a lookout spots a Garthim army in the distance, and the vote is cancelled. Panicked, Lahr urges everyone to run, but Neffi says she counted the votes, and the elders want to stay. Lahr comes back to his senses, and the Gelfling begin to arm. The Gelfling are a peaceful race and have no weapons, so they smash whatever they have to use as sharp objects.

Meanwhile, in Dark Castle, SkekTek is about to harvest the captured Gelfling's essence, but is confronted by SkekLach. He asks if the Emperor gets all the essence, and SkekTek assures him that he does; keeping any for himself is heresy. With this news, SkekLach takes some essence and drinks it to blackmail SkekTek.

The Gelflings at Namopo continue to arm. Tempers are running hot, since Gelflings are peaceful by nature, but Lahr assures them this is their only chance of survival.

Soon, they're ready for attack. Neffi has weaved a large net lined with spikes across the entrance to the valley to keep the Garthim out. It keeps them at bay, but soon they break through it, and the battle begins. It's a difficult fight, but the Garthim aren't used to being stood up to, so they become confused, and eventually retreat. SkekLach observes all of this, and vows that he shall be the one to take revenge.

The battle won for now, Lahr explains to the village that their victory was a matter of "doing what you can". Lahr and Neffi then decide to go to Dark Castle to rescue the other Gelflings.

== Characters ==
The General skekVar, as seen in Legends of the Dark Crystal Vol. 1: The Garthim Wars

The Collector skekLach, as seen in Legends of the Dark Crystal Vol. 1: The Garthim Wars

Lahr - The protagonist. He's a Gelfling shepherd and musician whose village is ransacked by Garthim. He's the first Gelfling to have ever killed a Garthim. He's strong and compassionate, and has a way with words. He's regarded as brave by the other Gelflings, but he doesn't see it as bravery so much as "doing what you can". He has a small, dog-like pet named Whouf, as well as a herd of large Mounders, large apelike creatures that resemble grassy hills with trees growing out of them when they sleep.

Neffi - A female Gelfling that accompanies Lahr. She was a weaver in her old village, which also came under Garthim attack. She's kind and playful, and loves children. She is also very resourceful and courageous.

Belleg - A high-ranking elder of the Gelfling village in Namopo Valley. He's an older Gelfling, and also narrowly avoided a Garthim attack when he was young. He remembers a time when Gelfling and Skeksis were not enemies. He's an outspoken leader, and is not above playing with some of the children and showing off on the battlefield.

Vhant - An elder that helps lead the battle against the Garthim. He's a stern and stoic leader, more soft-spoken than the other elders, such as Belleg. He is killed during the Garthim battle at the end of Volume 1.

Kelsee - A female Gelfling that acts as a lookout for Namopo Valley, and later commands an aerial unit to combat the Garthim. She's very energetic and carefree, and is a strong leader of the aerial command.

Smeeshun - A small Gelfling child that Elder Belleg has taken under his wing. He's very brave and headstrong, and wants to help however he can. He's given the responsibility of hiding the village children.

SkekSo - The Skeksis Emperor. He is advanced in age, and thus concerned about the supply of Gelfling essence, which grants youth. Vindictive and calculating, he is also wary of other Skeksis trying to usurp him.

SkekVar - A general in the Skeksis army. He has a strong sense of honour and is loyal to the emperor, but also rather defensive.

SkekTek - The head Skeksis scientist. He's in charge of harvesting Gelfling essence and creating the Garthim. He's a bit of a hermit, and also naïve and easy to manipulate.

SkekLach - A Skeksis who is in charge of collecting Gelflings. He blackmails SkekTek into servitude by taking Gelfling essence, which is only supposed to be given to the emperor. He's hungry for power, and is constantly scheming to get ahead, and to take revenge on the Gelflings.

UrSen - An urRu/Mystic Monk who narrates the story. He is SkekLach's mystic counterpart.

== Critical reception ==
The first volume of Legends of the Dark Crystal was received favourably by critics, earning a score of 9.7 out of 10 by IGN.

== Volume 2: Trial by Fire ==
Legends of the Dark Crystal was to be a three-volume series, similar to its sister series Return to Labyrinth. In the third volume of Return to Labyrinth, there was a sneak peek of the artwork for the second volume of Legends of the Dark Crystal. Volume 2, Trial by Fire, was released on August 3, 2010 and finished the story; the third volume having been cancelled.
