= Skeksis =

Characters in The Dark Crystal

- The Dark Crystal race
- First appearance: The Dark Crystal (1982)

In-universe information
- Home world: Thra

The Skeksis are a fictional species that serves as the main antagonists in the 1982 film The Dark Crystal and its related franchise. The word "Skeksis" serves as both singular and plural form for this species, with the singular being pronounced /ˈskɛksɪs/ and the plural /ˈskɛksiːz/. They are described by concept artist Brian Froud as "part reptile, part predatory bird, part dragon". The Skeksis are represented by puppets engineered under the direction of Jim Henson. Henson said that in the development of the Skeksis, the creators drew inspiration from the seven deadly sins. The ten members that the audience sees of the Skeksis, are all that are left of their race, rather than a token representative. As they do not need to need to reproduce, due to their immortality.

== Concept and creation ==
Jim Henson was inspired to design the Skeksis by an illustrated edition of a Lewis Carroll poem showing two elegantly dressed crocodiles in a bathroom. He became intrigued with the idea of a reptilian race assuming control over a formerly splendid past society, and developed the Skeksis with the concept that they represented the darker side of human nature. Numerous names were proposed for the species, including Skekses, Reptus, Karackt and Skek-sis.

Henson himself commented on the difficulty of performing as a Skeksis:

There were days I could work 'inside' my Skeksis character, the High Priest (Ritual-Master), without noticing the weight. But if I was feeling the least bit tired or run down, it was as if a building had caved in on me.

Conceptual designer Brian Froud designed the Skeksis as looking like "part reptile, part predatory bird, [and] part dragon," with a "penetrating stare."

The design of the Skeksis' robes was supervised by British artist and painter Sarah Bradpiece. The robes were fabricated with expensive materials (silks, furs, velvet, etc.) and exotic feathers, and decorated in jewels made from melted toy soldiers; skekTek the Scientist's bionic eye was made from a die-cast TIE fighter model's cockpit. To give the Skeksis their grubby appearance, the robes were then ripped and stained with fake dirt and paint. According to Froud, the robes were meant to reflect the Skeksis' unique personalities and functions within the castle.

Skekse was originally the singular form of Skeksis in the script.

== Performance ==
Each Skeksis puppet was controlled in the original film by as many as six puppeteers. The main puppeteer, wearing a heavy, robe-covered costume with a puppet head, would be assisted by a second performer operating the creature's right hand from inside the costume, and a team of four technicians in charge of its facial features. For wide shots of the Skeksis walking or running, actors of short stature were sometimes used as doubles. skekSil the Chamberlain's puppet, operated primarily by Frank Oz, was built with over 20 mechanical components.

Similar to Big Bird of Sesame Street, the lead puppeteer inside the Skeksis costume would wear a television monitor around their waist to gain a better sense of vision. The Skeksis hands were operated using a handheld trigger device that controlled the flexible rods serving as its fingers.

For Age of Resistance, the technical crew devised simpler ways to puppeteer the creatures, including the Skeksis. For wide shots of the Chamberlain, for example, his head was placed on a mechanical neck. This reduced the need for several performers and allowed the numerous animatronics in his head to be controlled from offscreen.

== Characteristics ==
=== Appearance ===
The Skeksis are tall bipeds, possessing both avian and reptilian features. They dress in elaborate (but threadbare) garments and robes of lace, velvet, and brocade to conceal their frail, rotting bodies while also appearing large and more intimidating. Their heads are beaked and vulturine in form, while also sporting sharp teeth (some Skeksis have more or less teeth than others). Their gluttony gives them enlarged bellies, and they have long, lizard-like tails, as well as curved quills on their backs. Despite possessing four arms, like their urRu counterparts, the Skeksis have only one functional pair as the other has become vestigial. This second pair of arms were, initially, wing-like before eventually withering and atrophying; (Note: As shown by the Chamberlain skekSil when he is stripped of his robe) however, skekMal is one of the few Skeksis to utilize these extra arms in The Dark Crystal: Age of Resistance.

Despite their frail appearance, Skeksis are physically powerful, as skekUng mustered his strength to cut through solid stone during the 'Trial by Stone' duel, while a provoked skekSil single-handedly slammed pilaster rock onto protagonist Jen.

=== Society ===
The Skeksis are the corrupt rulers of the planet Thra, having inherited it from their benevolent urSkek predecessors, and embody the knowledgeable, yet unrestrained aspects of the urSkeks' behavior. The Skeksis culture favors repetitive flamboyance, emotional pettiness, and a wasteful attitude toward life. Though they are capable of alliances, each acts only of self-preservation to the point of immediate betrayals to benefit their personal agenda. Despite their few numbers, the Skeksis form shifting political parties that stabilize the Skeksis society despite some causing friction among them, especially if the Emperor greatly favours one party over the others.

Before the events of Age of Resistance, the Skeksis were divided into the Imperial Allegiance (skekSo, skekSil, skekTek) which oversee their race's continuation, the Tithing Allegiance (skekLach, skekOk, skekEkt) who collect tributes from the Gelfling clans, and the Security Allegiance (skekVar, skekAyuk, skekZok) who command the Gelfling castle guards. But following the Garthim War and before events of the movie, the Skeksis reorganized themselves into the Diplomatic Allegiance (skekSil, skekOk, skekEkt) who maintain the castle to the Emperor's liking, The Religious Allegiance (skekZok, skekShod, skekAyuk) who oversee daily routines, and Military Allegiance (skekUng, skekTek, skekNa) who oversee the Garthim soldiers.

Due to the accelerated decomposition of their bodies, the Skeksis constantly attempt to prolong their lives by using the properties of the Dark Crystal itself. Their primary method is absorbing sunlight channeled through the Dark Crystal, its potency dependent on Thra's three suns. Another method is a form of acupuncture, in which power lines laid on their castle channels the planet's energy to them and feeds back noxious pulses, resulting in their kingdom's wasteland appearance. A third method is extracting the vitality from other life forms by exposing them to reflected beams from the Dark Crystal, a process that originally destroys the victims before it was refined enough to reduce them into nearly mindless drones which the Skeksis keep as slaves. The life force is collected in a liquid form that restores a Skeksis' youth and vitality, the Emperor eventually making law that only he can partake of it. Gelfling were originally used for this purpose until their near extinction forced the Skeksis to use Podlings instead, with the youth-inducing effects of the resulting elixir created from their life force lasting for a few seconds.

The Skeksis created the Garthim through grafting corpses of Arathim and Gruenak which are then animated by the Dark Crystal. Upon the discovery of a Gelfling prophecy which foretold the end of their power, the Skeksis used the Garthim to exterminate almost every single Gelfling on Thra, until only two, Jen and Kira, survived, to be raised by urSu the Mystic Master and the Podlings, respectively. They also bred the sentinel Crystal Bats, which were used as "eyes in the sky", scavenging above the landscape, and working closely with the Garthim, to locate potential targets.

=== Language ===
Originally, Jim Henson thought of having the Skeksis communicate through noises, though he later shot the film showing the Skeksis speaking a constructed language, based on Ancient Greek and Egyptian, devised by the author Alan Garner. The dialogue was later redubbed in English, as the original version proved unsuccessful in impressing test audiences. The original language is present in The World of the Dark Crystal and The Dark Crystal novelization, wherein (according to the former) it is "restricted to nouns, adjectives, and expletives", and has an object–verb–subject word order.

== History ==
skekUng the Garthim-Master and skekSil the Chamberlain perform the Haakskeekah (Trial By Stone).

The products of a botched attempt by the urSkeks to purge themselves of their imperfections while returning to their homeworld during a Great Conjunction, an event where the three suns of Thra produce a pure light that hits the Crystal, the Skeksis are the embodiments of their original selves' worst inhibitions compared to their urRu counterparts. Moments after coming into being, two of their own were accidentally killed, and infighting among the surviving Skeksis resulted in a Shard of the Crystal being broken off and lost. The urRu then left the Castle to the Skeksis, who began to modify the urSkeks' architecture with their own grotesque designs while attempting to create their own Crystal. The black rocks they created were reused as targets for the "Haakskeekah" rite, translated as "Trial by Stone", in which the loser is stripped of his position. The Skeksis have other means of punishment among their kin that include being maimed by an eye-gouging Peeper beetle.

According to The World of The Dark Crystal and The Dark Crystal: Age of Resistance series, possessing urSkeks' knowledge but lacking their restraint, the Skeksis were initially a vibrant and jovial race as they tricked Aughra into a deep sleep to metaphysically observe the universe. Unopposed, they ruled Thra over a thousand years and kept the Gelfling tribes divided while presenting themselves as their lords and protectors. But the dynamic changed as the Skeksis aged into haggard shells of their former selves as the Dark Crystal is unable to properly prolong their lives due to its connection to Thra, causing an epidemic called the Darkening that affects the planet's lifeforms. skekTek, with skekSil's help, developed a means to polarize the Dark Crystal's life-giving properties to extract life essence from Thra and its life forms to prolong their own lives. When the Gelfling learned of this and rebelled, they devised a prophecy revealing that one of them would end the rule of the Skeksis by restoring the broken Shard to the Crystal with the restoration of the urSkeks as consequence. When the Skeksis learned of this, they attempted to deter the Gelflings with Shard fabrications before using the newly created Garthim to wipe out the entire Gelfling race.

At the start of the film, skekUng succeeded skekSo as Emperor with only nine Skeksis remaining before skekTek was killed. Toward the end, protagonists Jen and Kira reunite them with the urRu to recreate the urSkeks who depart Thra.

== List of Skeksis ==
=== skekSo ===
Also known as the Emperor and the counterpart to the urRu urSu the Master, skekSo is described in The World of The Dark Crystal as originally being an energetic ruler who enjoyed lavish festivity and winning at sporting events but age made him paranoid and spiteful to even his fellow Skeksis, elevating individuals to high positions only to depose them afterward. SkekSo appears as the main antagonist of The Dark Crystal: Age of Resistance, which chronologically precedes the 1982 film, where he attempts to harness and control the energy of the Darkening, which causes his body to corrode at a quicker pace compared to the other Skeksis, leading to his eventual death shown in the original film's beginning. Once skekSo died, due to urSu willing himself to death to disrupt the Skeksis' hierarchy to give Jen a fighting chance against them, skekUng succeeded him as Emperor. In the film's deleted scenes, skekSo's decayed remains are cremated.

skekSo also has an appearance in Legends of the Dark Crystal.

In the film, skekSo is performed by Jim Henson and voiced by Jerry Nelson. In The Dark Crystal: Age of Resistance, skekSo is performed by Dave Chapman and voiced by Jason Isaacs.

=== skekSil ===
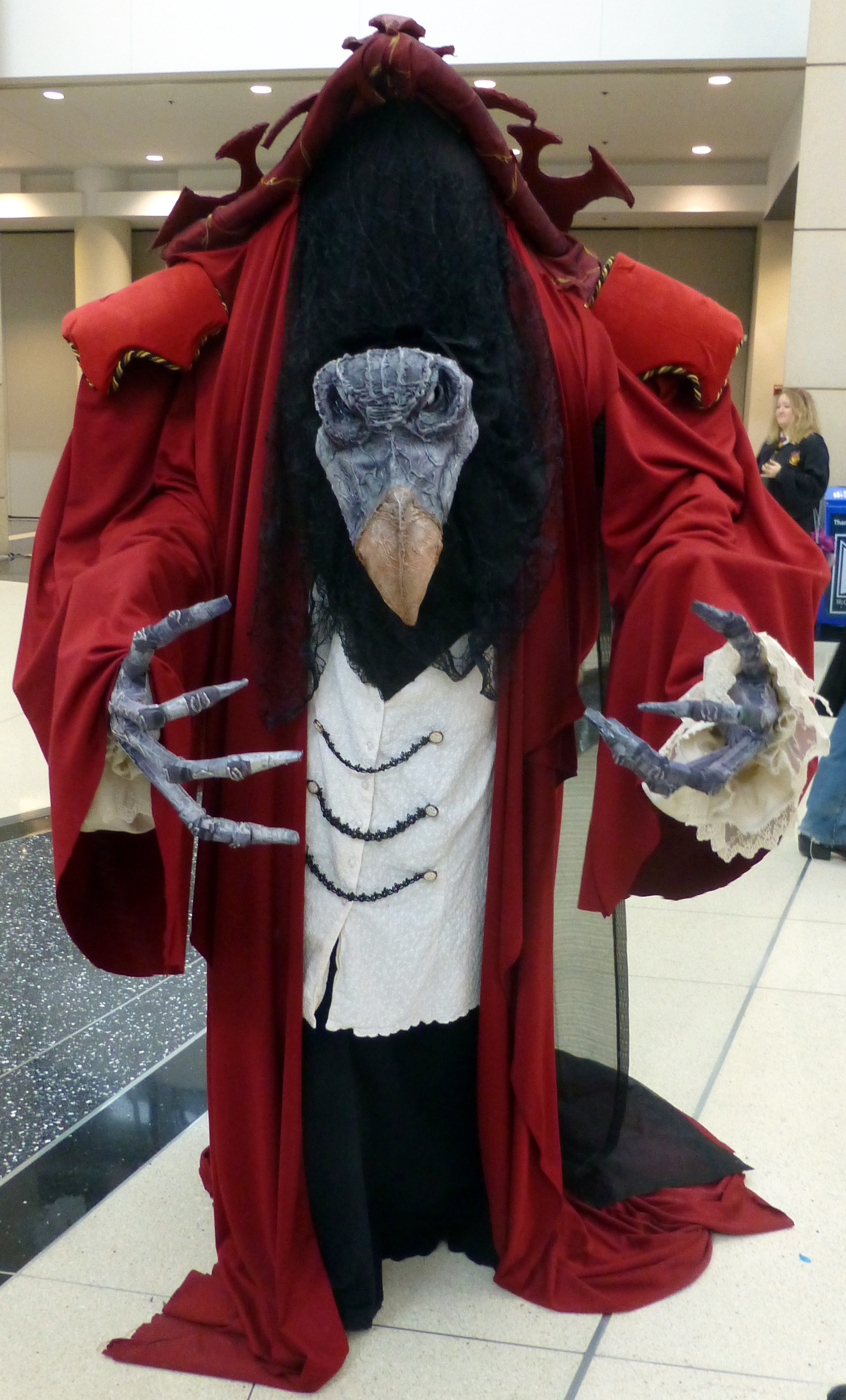
skekSil cosplayer.

Also known as the Chamberlain, the counterpart to the urRu urSol the Chanter. SkekSil is the Skeksis's chief secretary of state and next in line as Emperor of the Skeksis, being part of skekSo's Diplomatic Allegiance which also consisted of skekEkt and skekOk. However, skekSil is despised by the other Skeksis for his wheedling voice and underhanded nature, most notably by skekUng. During the events of Legends of the Dark Crystal, skekSil attempted to trick the Gelfling into distrusting the urRu while protecting his right of succession when it was being threatened by skekLach. In the first season of Age of Resistance, skekSil is revealed to have influenced skekTek in developing essence extraction and the creation of the Garthim. He also is the driving force behind the events of the show, from turning most of the Gelflings against Rian and each other, to securing the downfall and death of skekVar after he is replaced as the Emperor's closest advisor.

In the film, skekSil's confrontation with skekUng over succession resulted in his exile and the removal of his robes, and he attempts to regain his position by capturing a Gelfling. Of all the Skeksis, skekSil's intentions are never fully revealed and seem contradictory, most notably when he forcibly brought Kira to the other Skeksis and refused to allow them to kill her. When Kira was brought to the Skeksis, skekUng had skekSil reinstated and his robes returned to him. When the Crystal was restored, skekSil was absorbed by urSol as they reverted into their original urSkek form SilSol.

In the comic book sequel The Power of the Dark Crystal taking place a century after the events of the movie, skekSil and the other Skeksis were reconstituted due to Thurma removing the Shard from the Crystal. Immediately ostracized by his comrades for causing their previous defeat, skekSil pursues Thurma and Kensho and use the Shard to force the other Skeksis to submit to him. But he ends up being destroyed by the restored Crystal as it reformed itself into the Prism, housing his spirit and urSol within it.

In the film, skekSil is performed by Frank Oz and voiced by Barry Dennen. In The Dark Crystal: Age of Resistance, skekSil is performed by Warrick Brownlow-Pike and voiced by Simon Pegg.

=== skekUng ===
Also known as the Garthim-Master or the second General, the counterpart to the urRu urIm the Healer. SkekUng serves as the main antagonist of the original 1982 film, where he succeeds skekSo as Skeksis Emperor after his death.

He does not appear in the events of The Dark Crystal: Age of Resistance, although skekZok suggests recalling him to the castle as a "strong warrior" for their fight against the Gelfling. Being the second strongest of the Skeksis, he replaced skekVar as the General after his death. He had a bitter rivalry with skekSil, which culminated in a duel for supremacy. Though the other Skeksis admire his ferocity, his constant failure to capture the surviving Gelfling fails to evoke the respect of his subjects. He is suspicious of skekZok's loyalty, and is constantly fearing a challenge to his authority.

In the novel, after the Chamberlain returns to the castle with a kidnapped Kira to be drained of her essence, and subsequently returns to his position of power, skekUng begins to spiral further into paranoia, plotting to murder skekTek and unleash his Garthim soldiers on every single form of life on Thra, to prevent the regeneration of the Gelfling population.

When the Crystal was restored, skekUng was absorbed by urIm as they reverted into their original urSkek form UngIm, who leads the urSkeks back to their world.

In the film, skekUng is performed by Dave Goelz and voiced by Michael Kilgarriff.

=== skekZok ===
Also known as the Ritual-Master and the counterpart to the urRu urZah the Ritual-Guardian, skekZok is the high priest who oversees the Skeksis' rituals and leader of the Religious Allegiance. Until the story of the film, skekZok "fancied himself skekSo's closest adviser, and sought to control the other Skeksis through false prophecies and apparitions, although they distrusted his divinations and practised their own." Though a contender for the throne after skekSo's death, skekZok sides with skekUng. Though he assists in the search for the surviving Gelfling with his Crystal bats, he is nonetheless distrusted and feared by skekUng. When skekSil arrived with Kira, he was annoyed at skekUng's commands to drain Kira of essence before killing her, as he insisted she must be killed immediately. Ironically, skekZok's impulse to kill Kira the moment she threw the Shard to Jen led to the Skeksis' downfall with skekZok absorbed by urZah back into their original urSkek form ZokZah.

In the film, skekZok is performed by Jim Henson and voiced by Jerry Nelson. In The Dark Crystal: Age of Resistance, skekZok is performed by Victor Yerrid and voiced by Keegan-Michael Key.

=== skekTek ===
Also known as the Scientist and the counterpart to the urRu urTih the Alchemist, his obsession depraved to the point of amputating his two right limbs and replacing them with prosthetics and replacing his jugular vein with a transparent tube, skekTek is the Skeksis who conducts his research and experiments in the Castle's Chamber of Life. Through both skekSo's abuse and skekSil's influence, skekTek learned to harness the Dark Crystal's ability to extract essence and created the Garthim soldiers to quell the growing threat of Gelfling rebellion, and eventually, as an extermination force against the entire race. He was once considered a friend of Aughra, having mentored her when he and urTih were originally the urSkek TekTih.

During the events of The Dark Crystal: Age of Resistance, skekTek outfitted himself with a visual prosthesis after his right eye was ripped out by a Peeper Beetle as punishment for failing to prevent the Gelfling Rian from escaping with a vial of essence.

By the time of the film, he had replaced his jugular vein with a transparent external tube to monitor his own circulation and his right arm and right leg with mechanical prosthetics and can be seen leaning on a cane. Because of his maltreatment by the other Skeksis, skekTek outright called himself "the most abused creature in all of Thra". skekSil provided skekTek with Gruenak helpers before later killing them when they tried to rebel, using one of them for parts in creating the Garthim. During the film, skekTek sided with skekUng after he became the new Emperor and convinced him to let him drain Kira of her essence, but Kira persuaded all the laboratory animals skekTek experimented on to attack him, resulting in him losing his footing and falling down the Crystal Shaft into the magma below with urTih incinerated as a result.

skekTek has appearances in Legends of the Dark Crystal.

skekTek is performed and voiced by Steve Whitmire in the film. In The Dark Crystal: Age of Resistance, skekTek is performed by Olly Taylor and voiced by Mark Hamill. Whitmire based skekTek's voice loosely on that of Peter Lorre while Hamill's voice for skekTek is noticeably raspier and gives him an added stertor.

=== skekAyuk ===
Also known as the Gourmand and the counterpart to the urRu urAmaj the Cook, skekAyuk is a gluttonous Skeksis who uses his status as the court's gourmet expert to devise menus for the feasts, preferring strong flavors and living prey. He is occasionally seen alongside both skekEkt and skekShod, being hypocritical in belittling his fellow Skeksis. In Age of Resistance, he is the only Skeksis besides skekTek to understand that the Crystal's failures in giving energy for the Skeksis to take was due to their constant abuse. In the novel, both he and skekEkt are part of skekSo's faction and support skekSil before turning on him once he loses. In the film, he and skekShod ultimately support skekZok. When the Crystal was restored, skekAyuk was absorbed by urAmaj as they reverted into their original urSkek form AyukAmaj.

In the film, skekAyuk is performed by Louise Gold and voiced by Thick Wilson. In The Dark Crystal: Age of Resistance, skekAyuk is performed again by Gold and voiced by Harvey Fierstein.

=== skekEkt ===
Also known as the Ornamentalist and the counterpart to the urRu urUtt the Weaver, skekEkt is the more appearance-focused of the Skeksis and wears elaborate clothing that reflects his vanity. Despite possessing a genuine gift as a fashion designer, skekEkt is nonetheless described in The World of the Dark Crystal as an extremely vain and callous character who would gladly cause the death of countless animals for the sake of fabricating one cloak. According to skekSil's thoughts in The Dark Crystal novelization, skekEkt's uncharismatic depravity was considered excessive, even by the standards of the Skeksis, to the point where it would never command their obedience. He has the responsibility of giving the final say in the selection of experimental Podling slaves modified by skekTek for ritual choruses. He is occasionally seen alongside both skekOk and skekAyuk. Interestingly, skekOk and skekAyuk are loyal to skekSil like skekEkt (depending on the film and novel versions) before turning on him once he loses. When the Crystal was restored, skekEkt was absorbed by urUtt as they reverted into their original urSkek form EktUtt.

In the film, skekEkt is performed and voiced by Brian Muehl. In The Dark Crystal: Age of Resistance, skekEkt is performed and voiced by Alice Dinnean.

=== skekNa ===
Also known as the Slave-Master and the counterpart to the urRu urNol the Herbalist, skekNa is the supervisor and disciplinarian of the Skeksis' slaves. He is described in The World of the Dark Crystal as "purely and openly evil from the beginning" and in The Dark Crystal novelization as having "no imagination and no nobility at all." He has a hook for a left hand and an eye patch to hide his missing right eye. He dubiously claims to have an ear for music, and takes it upon himself to select specific slaves for skekTek to experiment upon. Along with skekTek, he is a strong supporter of skekUng, and at one point was considered for promotion to the rank of Patriarch for his loyalty. When the Crystal was restored, skekNa was absorbed by urNol as they reverted into their original urSkek form NaNol.

He was mentioned by skekZok in The Dark Crystal: Age of Resistance, as skekOk considers calling the rest of the Skeksis back to the Castle during their battle against the Gelflings, noting that he, like skekSa the Mariner, would be "useful in a fight."

In the film, skekNa is performed by Mike Quinn and voiced by David Buck.

=== skekShod ===
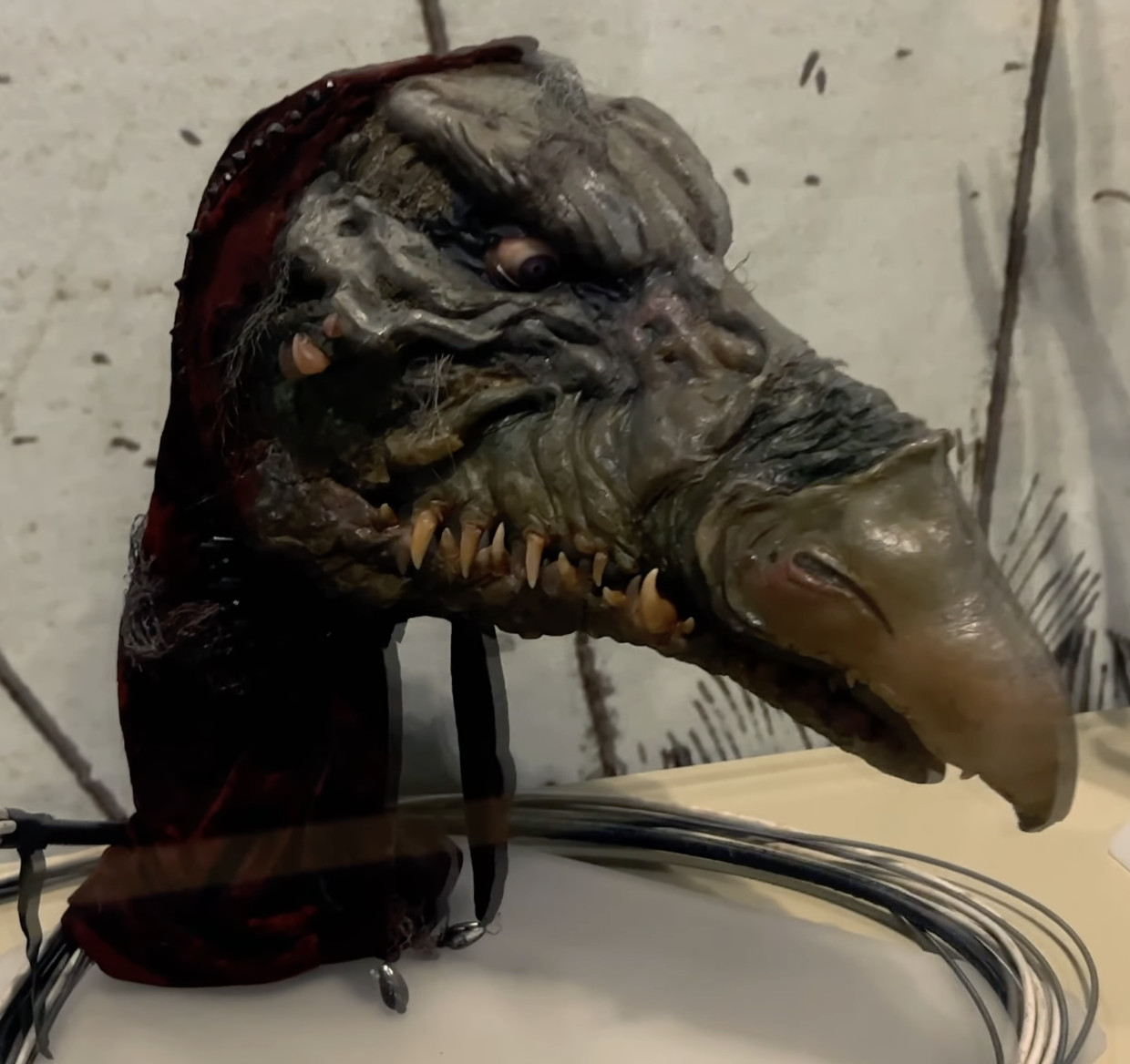
The head of the skekShod puppet used in The Dark Crystal on display at the Center for Puppetry Arts, Atlanta

Also known as the Treasurer, the counterpart to the urRu urYod the Numerologist, and administratively skekSil's subordinate, skekShod is incapable of acknowledging anyone's presence unless offered some gift. Due to his limited vocabulary and excessive material desires, he frequently bribes the other Skeksis into loaning him their personal possessions. While not appearing or even mentioned in Age of Resistance, skekShod appears in the comic book sidestory which reveals him to oversee the Spritons' tithes and caused Hup's exile from Sami Thicket when he provoked the Podling to hit him. Along with skekAyuk and skekOk, he is a supporter of skekZok following skekSo's death. When the Crystal was restored, skekShod was absorbed by urYod as they reverted into their original urSkek form ShodYod.

In the film, skekShod is performed by Tim Rose and voiced by Charles Collingwood.

=== skekOk ===
Also known as the Scroll-Keeper and the counterpart to the urRu urAc the Scribe, skekOk is the smallest and most deceptive of the Skeksis who prides himself in his writing skills and owns a private library in the castle depicting numerous secrets. skekOk uses his talents as a historian to alter the documentation of his kind's history to reflect his ever-shifting political allegiance, until all truth was lost. He was also prone to mood swings and could often be found mumbling to himself. He was always late for the Skeksis' meetings and very often fell asleep during them. In Age of Resistance skekOk is also shown to have diplomatic talents that rival skekSil's, being in charge of recording (and occasionally extorting) the tributes given to the Skeksis by the Gelfling. He also "befriends" Brea for a while, and suggests summoning the rest of the Skeksis back to the castle after skekMal turns up nearing death. In the film, his loyalty is ultimately to skekSil. In the novel, his loyalty is to skekZok. When the Crystal was restored, skekOk was absorbed by urAc as they reverted into their original urSkek form OkAc.

In the film, skekOk is performed by Bob Payne and voiced by John Baddeley. In The Dark Crystal: Age of Resistance, skekOk is performed and voiced by Neil Sterenberg.

=== Expanded universe ===
Through the years various comics and novels were made which serve as prequels to the events of the film, introducing various Skeksis. Over the time their living number, names, positions and even counterparts were changed. This is evident since current canon claims there were 18 Skeksis to begin with yet throughout all forms of The Dark Crystal media there are around 20 individual Skeksis names.

==== skekVar ====
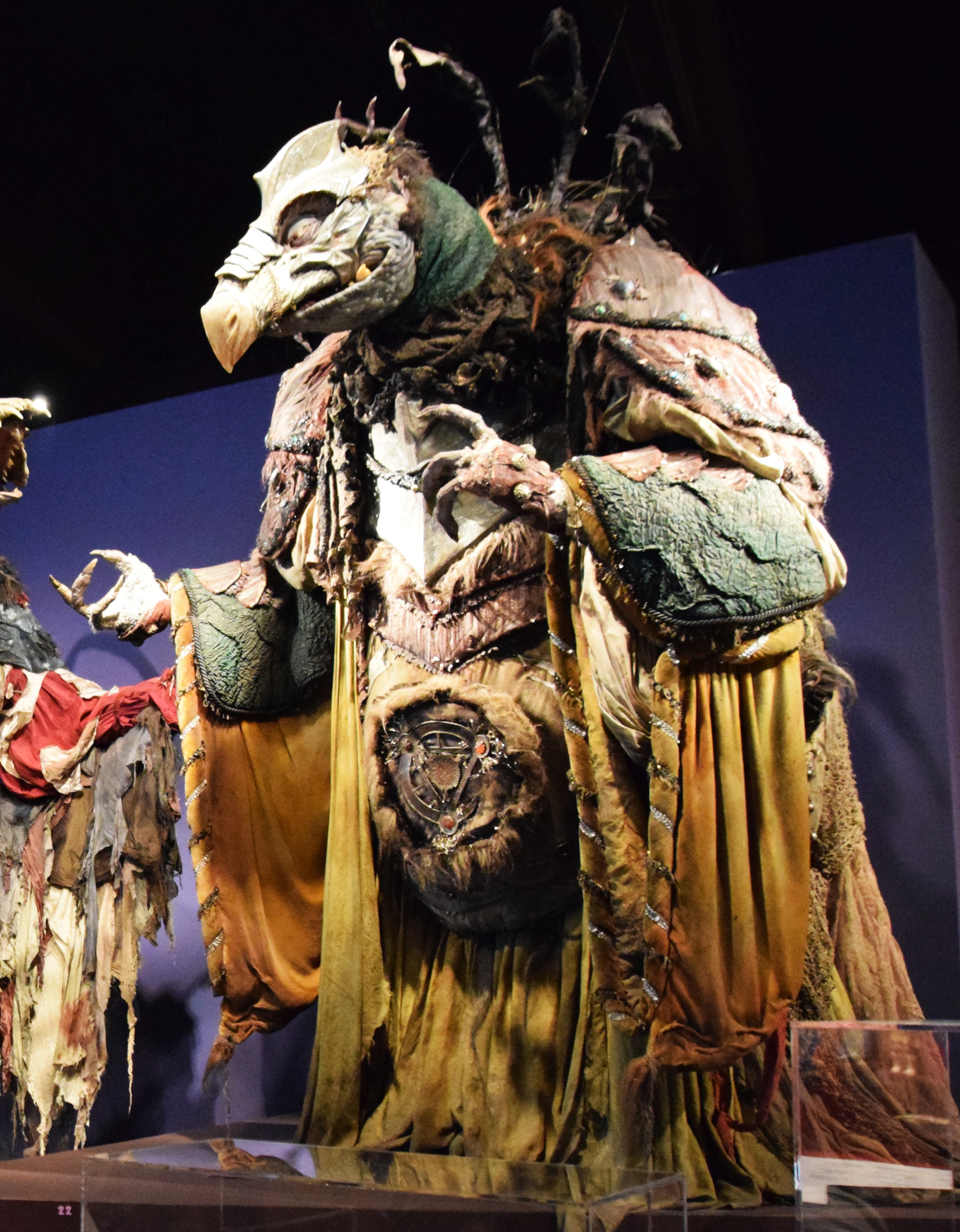
The skekVar puppet used in The Dark Crystal: Age of Resistance

Also known as the General and the counterpart to the urRu urMa the Peacemaker, skekVar is a loyal but violent and short-tempered military leader who killed All-Maudra Mayrin when she learned of her people being used by the Skeksis to prolong their lives. When skekVar was named the Emperor's new council in place of skekSil, he ended up being secretly murdered by skekSil in a scheme to regain their Emperor's trust while destroying skekVar's reputation. Before his death, he along with the Chamberlain, brought forth to the Emperor and Scientist the idea of Soldiers that would be soulless yet loyal: these would later become the Garthim. However, with skekVar gone, all the Skeksis, in particular the Scientist, would later lay claim to their creation.

skekVar first appeared in the two volume manga Legends of the Dark Crystal by Tokyopop, the three volume series The Dark Crytal: Creation Myths by Archaia Comics, and other media created by the Jim Henson Company, though his role in the story was slightly altered.

skekVar first on camera appearance was in the Netflix prequel series The Dark Crystal: Age of Resistance where he was performed by Kevin Clash and voiced by Benedict Wong.

==== skekLach ====
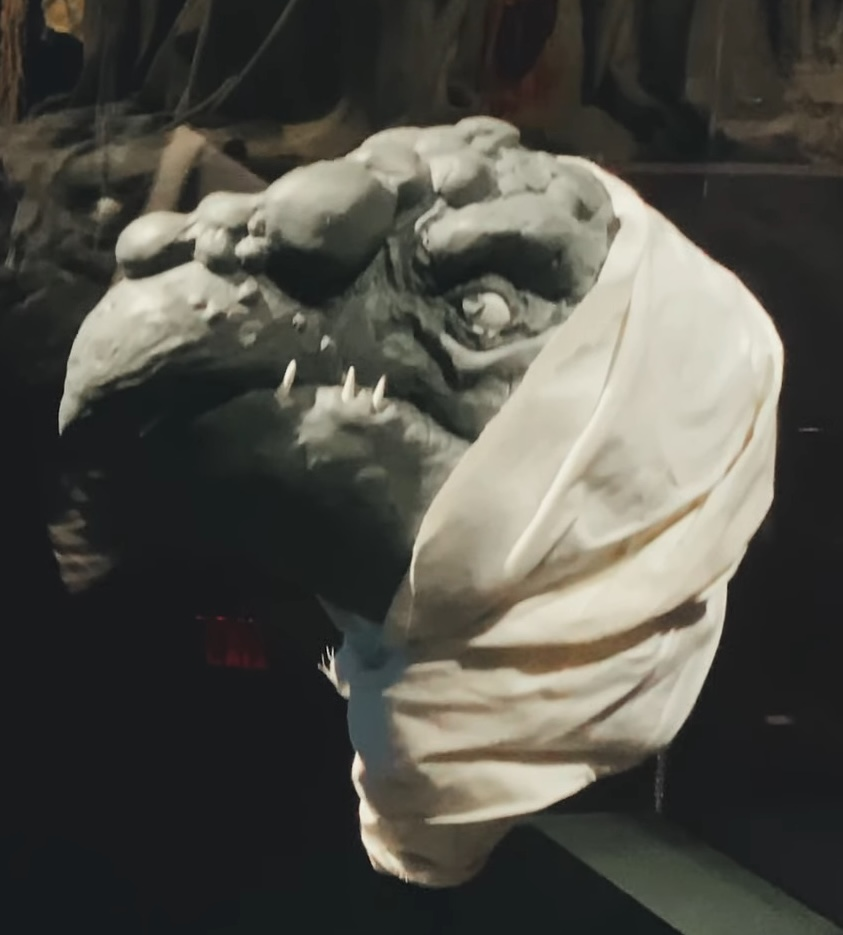
A maquette of skekLach, created for The Dark Crystal: Age of Resistance, on display at the Museum of the Moving Image

Also known as the Collector and the counterpart to the urRu urSen the Monk, skekLach is a sickly and jaded Skeksis who is also known for his role in overseeing the Gelfling's tribute.

Appearing in the first season of Age of Resistance, skekLach is killed by exploding in a pile of pus when Deet uses her powers to redirect the Darkening's energy back at the Skeksis.

His design and personality has differed in his various appearances: in the comics depicted with a mechanised arm, elaborate coat, and a scarred face, been more cunning in a battle of wits with the Chamberlain, while secretly withholding Gelfling essence for himself and using skekVar as a scapegoat.

skekLach appeared in The Dark Crystal: Age of Resistance where he was performed by Helena Smee and voiced by Awkwafina.

==== skekMal ====
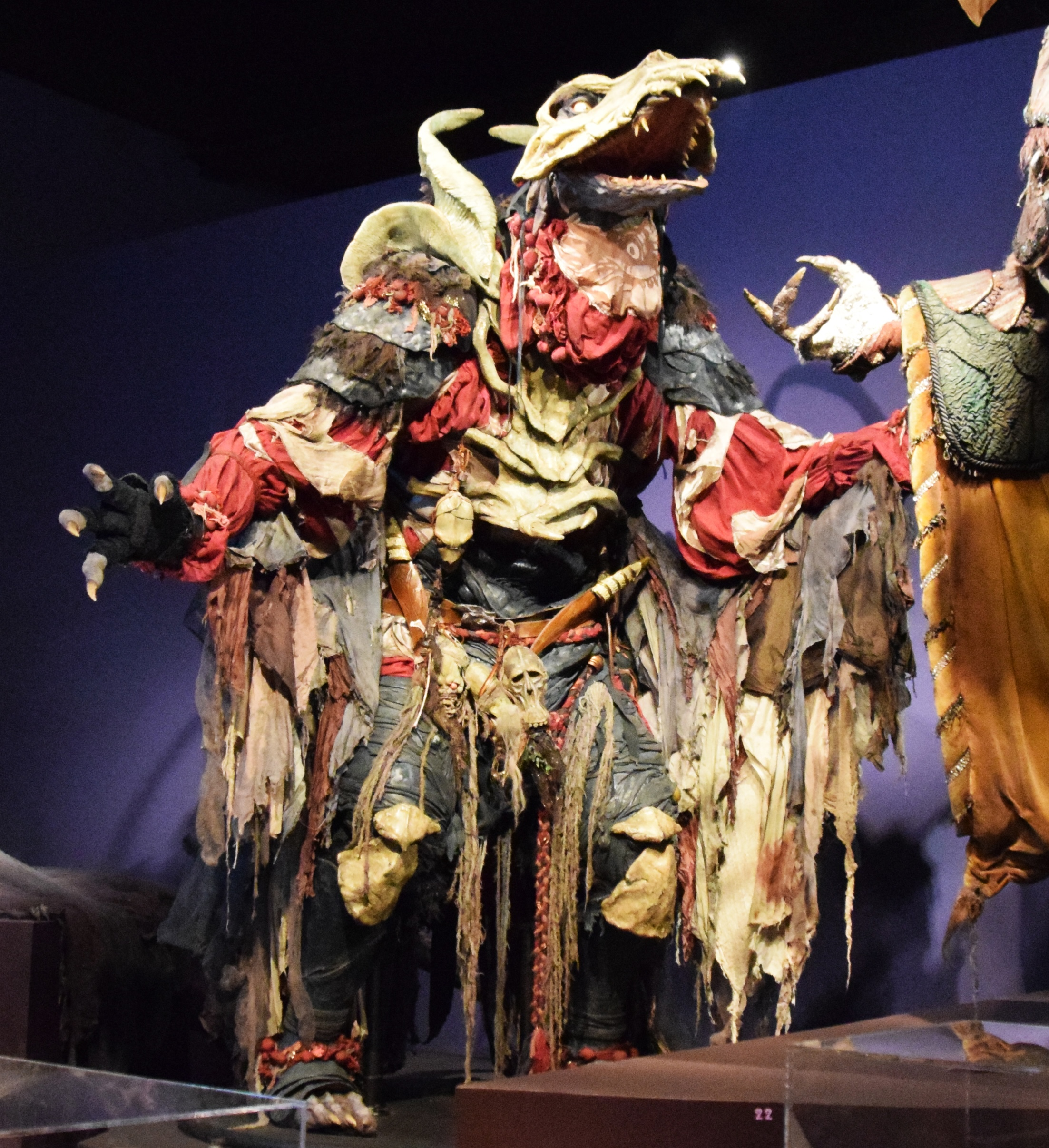
The skekMal puppet used in The Dark Crystal: Age of Resistance

Known as the Hunter and the counterpart to the urRu urVa the Archer, skekMal is a Skeksis introduced in the J.M. Lee novel Shadows of the Dark Crystal.

He also appears in The Dark Crystal: Age of Resistance, wearing a spirit-like skull mask that conceals his scarred face and sports an extra pair of retractable arms. Considering himself a sportsman who relentlessly hunts his quarry down, skekMal is a brutal killer so feared even by his own kind that they tend to summon his services as a last resort. Thus few Gelfling knew of his existence as he eats his prey and keeps their skulls as his trophies. He is skilled in trapping and combat, being one of the few Skeksis to use his extra arms in a fight, with animalistic movement. Hired by skekSil to acquire Rian, skekMal's hunt brings him in conflict with urVa. When skekMal was badly wounded by urVa, he brought Brea back to the Skeksis' castle before collapsing. As the Skeksis worked to keep him alive, Aughra offered her lifeforce in order for skekMal to be saved. During the battle in Stone-In-The-Wood, urVa commits suicide by jumping to his death in order to stop his counterpart for good. This enables Aughra to be reconstituted. In episode 8 of The Dark Crystal: Age of Resistance, Aughra expresses some fondness for him, declaring that skekMal was "the most beautiful of the lot" despite his scent of death.

In The Dark Crystal: Age of Resistance, skekMal is performed by Kevin Clash, in-suit performed by Nick Kellington, and voiced by Ralph Ineson. Two additional puppeteers in blue screen suits operated skekMal's retractable arms.

==== skekGra ====
Previously known as the Conqueror, eccentric in personality, skekGra originally served as a militant leader in the Skeksis until he and his urRu counterpart urGoh the Wanderer both received a vision of the eventual reunion of their races into their original selves. Both desired to merge back into the urSkek GraGoh, but skekGra was cast out by the Skeksis as "The Heretic" for his attempts to convince them to rejoin their urRu counterparts. skekGra and urGoh were forced to live together in self-imposed exile in the Crystal Desert where they waited for the Gelfling Rian, Brea, and Deet so they could give them the Crystal Shard that was concealed in the Dual Glaive sword they forged. skekGra eventually became rather boisterous and eccentric, describing himself as a fun Skeksis. He and urGoh became skilled at the art of puppetry.

In Age of Resistance, skekGra is performed by Damian Farrell and voiced by Andy Samberg.

==== skekEer ====
Introduced only in Legends of the Dark Crystal: Volume 2: Trial by Fire, he was an ally of skekVar the General. skekEer was the Spy-Master, but neither his urRu counterpart nor urSkek name has never been depicted or identified. Since the new books and the prequel show, skekEer has been removed from canon with skekNa revealed to be the Skeksis in charge of spies before becoming the slave-master.

==== skekSa and skekCru ====
The Skeksis Mariner skekCru was first introduced in volume 2 of Tokyopop's Legends of the Dark Crystal and was a political ally of skekVar the General, along with the Spy-Master, skekEer, and had little to say in the manga. The Mariner would be revamped as a female Skeksis called skekSa (also known as the Captain) and was as a major character in the J.M. Lee novel Tides of the Dark Crystal, making her a canon Skeksis. Her urRu counterpart was urSan the Swimmer; they made the urSkek SaSan.

skekZok mentions skekSa in The Dark Crystal: Age of Resistance while considering recruiting more Skeksis to help battle the Gelfling, noting that she, like skekNa the Slave Master, would be "useful in a fight."

==== skekLi ====
skekLi was the Skeksis Satirist who wrote stories for the enjoyment of the Skeksis. His urRu counterpart was urLii the Storyteller, making the urSkek LiLii. He was the main antagonist in the J.M. Lee novel Song of the Dark Crystal,, making him a canon Skeksis.

skekOk mentions him in The Dark Crystal: Age of Resistance, when he considers recalling the other Skeksis to help fight against the Gelfling.

==== skekHak and skekYi ====
These were two Skeksis seen at the end of Volume 2 of The Dark Crystal: Creation Myths from Archaia Comics, and who died immediately after the botched division of the urSkeks when a rogue Skeksis killed their urRu counterparts: one was strangled while the other was thrown into the fire shaft under the Crystal. In the J.M.Lee novel Flames of the Dark Crystal their back story is changed with only one of them dying when their urRu counterpart is killed by another Skeksis who attacks it with a crystal staff. It is currently unknown how the canon events play out. skekHak's urRu counterpart was urHom and the two formed HakHom the urSkek Architect, while skekYi's counterpart was urYa, making YiYa the urSkek Conservator. Their deaths established the knowledge of the Skeksis and urRu still being connected, with the former race leaving their counterparts alone out of self-preservation.

Either both or one of them are indirectly mentioned in Age of Resistance by skekZok when he mentions that no Skeksis died between the skirmish that took place after their creation and the Gelfing's rebellion after the news of skekMal's first death. If, in the canon story, skekHak survived, it is implied he was the one who remodelled the Crystal Castle to better resemble the Skeksis themselves, while if he died, other sources claim skekShod and skekNa remodelled the Crystal Castle, as punishment for defying skekSo's position as Emperor.

==== Confirmed canon Skeksis ====
These Skeksis appear in the original film, the Netflix prequel series, and J. M. Lee novels (Shadows of the Dark Crystal, Song of the Dark Crystal, Tides of the Dark Crystal, and Flames of the Dark Crystal).

- skekSo the Emperor
- skekSil the Chamberlain
- skekVar the General (originally called the Ambassador)
- skekUng (originally called the Executioner, then the Garthim-Master, then the Second General, finally the Second Emperor)
- skekZok the Ritual-Master (also known as the High Priest)
- skekEkt the Ornamentalist (also known as the Designer)
- skekTek the Scientist
- skekShod the Treasurer
- skekOk the Scroll-Keeper (also known as the Historian)
- skekNa (originally called the Spy-Master, then the Slave-Master, would have been given the title of Patriarch)
- skekAyuk the Gourmand (also known as the Gourmet)
- skekLach the Collector (originally called the Census-Taker)
- skekMal the Hunter
- skekGra the Heretic (formerly the Conqueror)
- skekLi the Satirist (also known as the Jester)
- skekSa the Mariner (also known as the Captain and the Sailor)
- skekYi the Steward
- skekHak the Machinist (also known as the Merchant)

== Reception ==
Empire described the Skeksis as among the best realized creatures of The Dark Crystal, stating that they stopped the film from losing itself in "sappy moralism" and that they invited an inquiry on the "avaricious nature of evil." Total Film placed the Skeksis in first place on its list of the 30 greatest creations of Jim Henson, calling them his most iconic and terrifying creations, as well as being "almost too real". Syfy lauded the Skeksis as characters who were "an unfairly overlooked entry in the pantheon of great genre movie villains", citing how they maintained the ugliness and brutality of villains from old fairy tales.

The portrayal of the Skeksis in The Dark Crystal: Age of Resistance has been generally well received by critics. Samantha Nelson of The Verge wrote that the Skeksis compensate for the lack of distinct qualities in the series' heroes, while Collider described them as "delightfully macabre and grotesque".

== Interpretations ==
Cheryl Henson stated that the Skeksis and Mystics represented two aspects of the entertainment industry for her father, with the Mystics being the creative side and the Skeksis personifying the stressful financial part.

Peter T. Chattaway, writing on Patheos from a Christian perspective, proposed that the Skeksis represent the physical realm as shown by their greed for both food and power, in contrast to the spiritual Mystics.

Professor Sidney Dobrin, while characterizing the Skeksis as the "epitome of evil", opined that they represent environmental destruction, in contrast to the Mystics who personify environmental harmony, citing how the former abuse the world and torture its inhabitants.

Roxanne Hard of the University of Alberta viewed the Skeksis as the personifications of power, as conceived by Michel Foucault in his work Society Must Be Defended, where he proposed that power was first and foremost based on the imposition of force. As such, Harde notes how the Skeksis seem to revel not so much in the possession of Thra's resources, but in their violent acquisition, and that the intrigues of the Chamberlain reveal how much the species celebrates political maneuvering for its own sake.

Gideon Haberkorn of the University of Mainz noted how the Skeksis' decadence, abuse of science and enslavement of more primitive races are essentially a parody of civilization, in contrast to the Mystics who embody the "noble savage".

Mat Auryn, writing on Patheos from a Christian perspective, noted how the original 10 Skeksis were evocative of the 10 Qliphoth on the Tree of Life, the dark opposites of the 10 holy Sefira evoked by the Mystics. He also noted similarities between the Skeksis and the Mesopotamian Apkallu, deities sometimes portrayed as bird-headed who watch over the Tree of Life, much as the Skeksis do with the Crystal.

== Other appearances ==
- The Skeksis frames were modified and reused in the second-season episode of Farscape – "Out of Their Minds", 18 years after the release of The Dark Crystal.
- Canadian extreme metal group Strapping Young Lad named a track after the Skeksis on their 2005 album Alien.
- In the second episode of the 2014 television series Jim Henson's Creature Shop Challenge, the contest's theme revolved around the Skeksis where the contestants had to create a Skeksis who was banished to a different part of Thra and has been recalled to the Skeksis Castle.
- In the Scissor Sisters self-titled debut album, released in 2004, the Skeksis are referenced in the last track "Return to Oz".
- In the 2019 video game Borderlands 3, the Skeksis are referenced with a weapon in the game named "SkekSil", after the Chamberlain. The weapon's special ability is called "Get back, spithead!", a reference to a phrase uttered by the same Skeksis in the film.
- In The Areas of My Expertise by John Hodgman the satirical almanac of fake facts, the Skeksis titles are listed among the 700 hobo names as hobo #291 to #300.
- In the South Park episode "Tsst", a character named Nanny Skexis appears during a parody of Nanny 911. The character bears a striking resemblance to the Chamberlain.
