= The Dark Crystal (video game) =

1983 video game

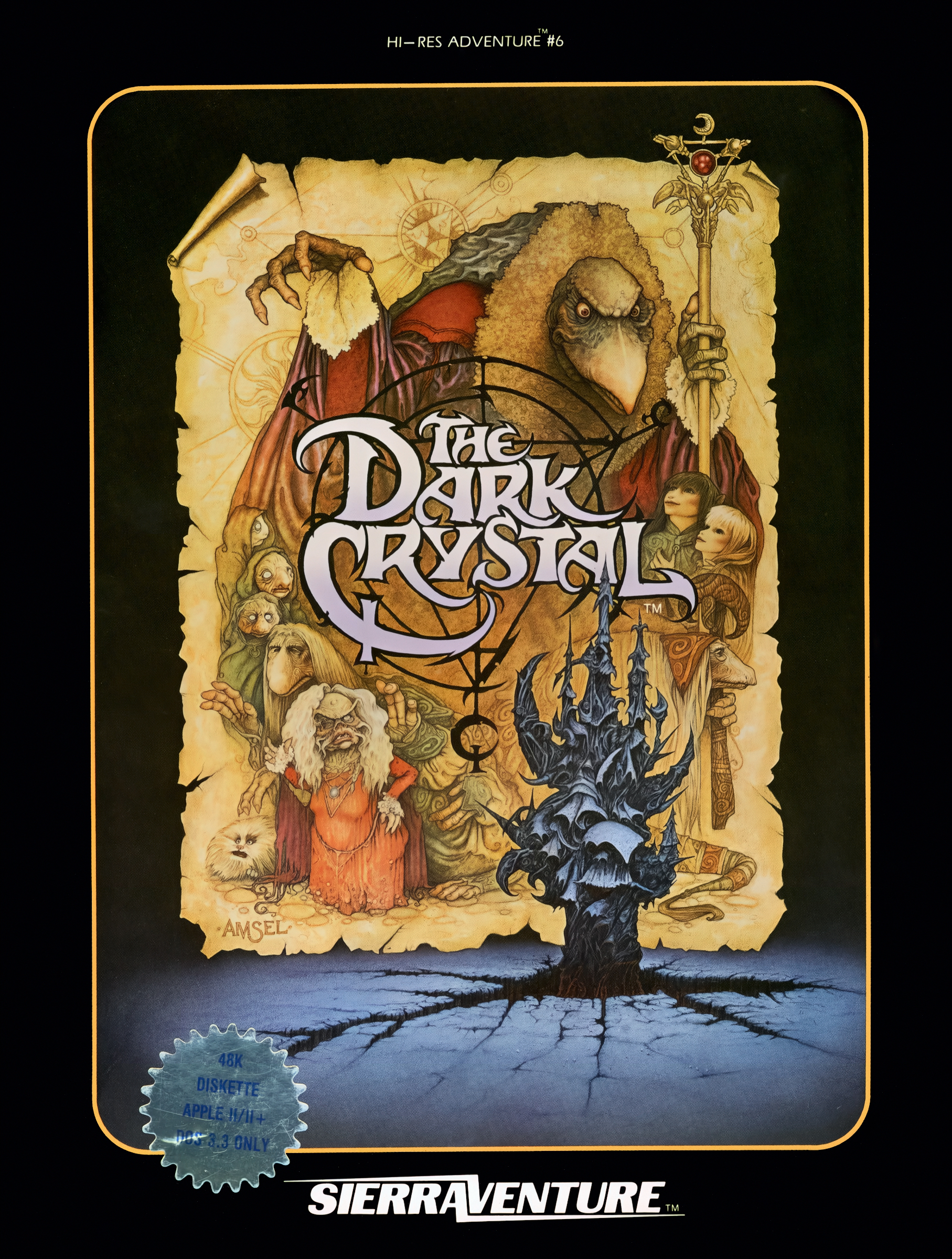
- Developer: Sierra On-Line
- Publisher: SierraVenture
- Designer: Roberta Williams
- Artist: Jim Mahon
- Series: Hi-Res Adventure
- Engine: ADL
- Platforms: Apple II, Atari 8-bit
- Release: 1983
- Genre: Adventure
- Mode: Single-player

Hi-Res Adventure #6: The Dark Crystal is a graphic adventure game based on Jim Henson's 1982 fantasy film, The Dark Crystal. The game was designed by Roberta Williams and was the first Hi-Res Adventure directly released under the SierraVenture label in 1983. Versions were published for the Apple II and Atari 8-bit computers. An alternative version of the game intended for younger players called Gelfling Adventure was released in 1984.

== Development ==
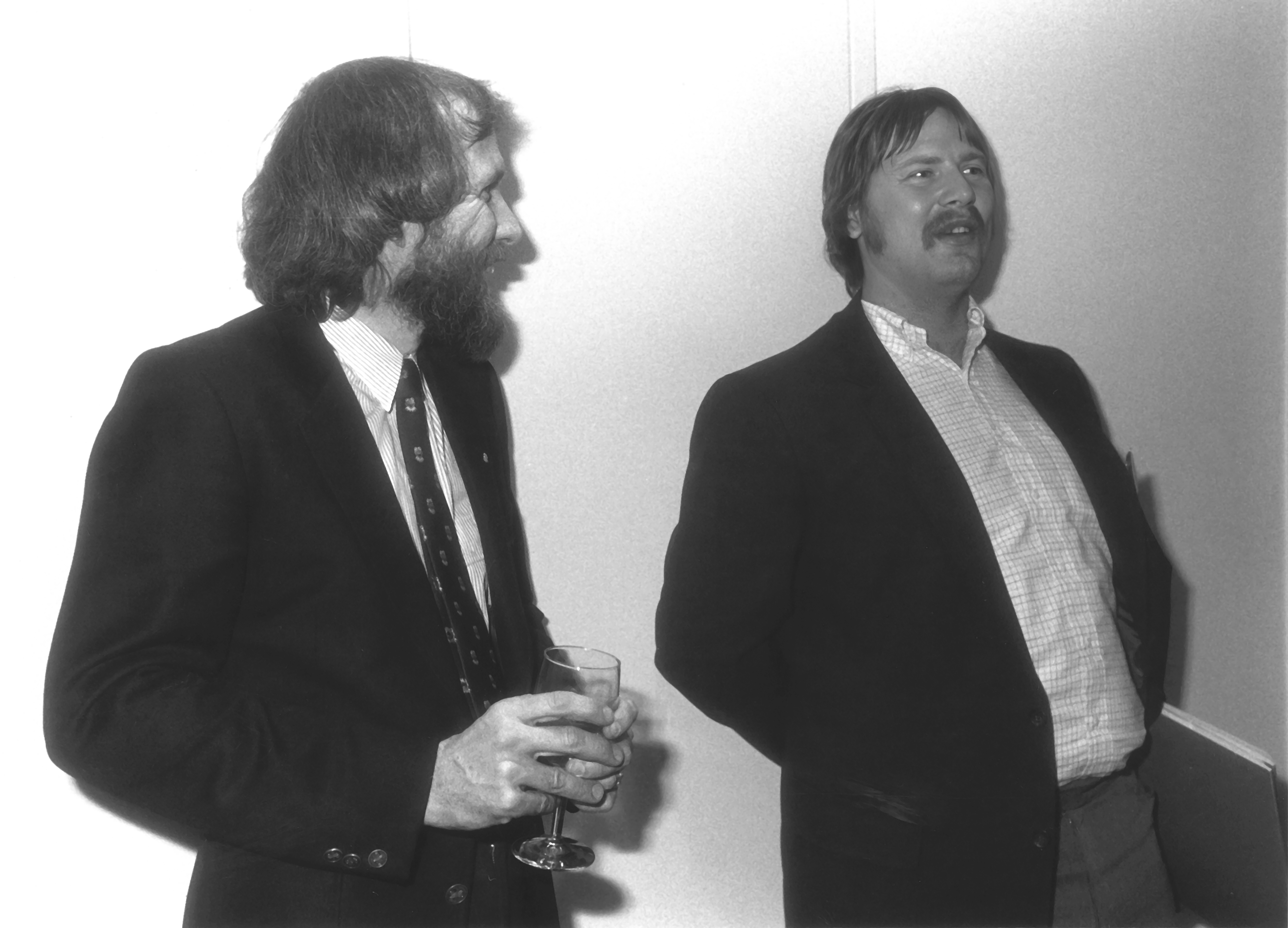
Jim Henson, director and producer of The Dark Crystal, and Ken Williams, game programmer

It took Roberta Williams a little over a month to develop the design for the game, which was then turned over to programmers and artists.

== Reception ==
Softline considered the game to be better than the film, stating The Dark Crystal's "thin story that failed to serve the movie well is comparatively top-drawer material in the game" and called the graphics "delightful". The game received a Certificate of Merit in the category of "1984 Best Computer Adventure" at the 5th annual Arkie Awards.

InfoWorld's Essential Guide to Atari Computers recommended the game as among the best adventure games for the Atari 8-bit. In a 1983 review of the Atari 8-bit version for Hi-Res magazine, Mark S. Murley found the game too clearly linear and disliked having to swap between three disks. He wrote:

If the narrowness of the game and the disk-swapping problem were the only negative aspects of The Dark Crystal, then I might be tempted to at least recommend it, however, to novice Adventurers. The graphics themselves are a little lackluster, and the color is not the best. This is distracting in an Adventure of this scope wherein so much of the player's time is spent looking at dozens of screens.
