= The Dark Crystal =

1982 film by Jim Henson, Frank Oz

- Theatrical release poster by Richard Amsel
- Directed by: Jim Henson; Frank Oz
- Screenplay by: David Odell
- Story by: Jim Henson
- Produced by: Jim Henson; Gary Kurtz
- Starring: Stephen Garlick; Lisa Maxwell; Billie Whitelaw; Percy Edwards
- Cinematography: Oswald Morris
- Edited by: Ralph Kemplen
- Music by: Trevor Jones
- Production companies: ITC Entertainment; Henson Associates
- Distributed by: Universal Pictures; Associated Film Distribution (Note: The film's distribution rights were purchased by The Jim Henson Company from ITC Entertainment in August 1984. Currently, Universal Pictures handles theatrical distribution in the United States and internationally (including the United Kingdom) due to prior contractual obligations with the former Associated Film Distribution and ITC, but the film's ownership and copyright are controlled by The Jim Henson Company.) (United States); United International Pictures (United Kingdom)
- Release dates: December 13, 1982 (New York City); December 17, 1982 (United States); February 17, 1983 (United Kingdom)
- Running time: 93 minutes
- Countries: United States; United Kingdom
- Language: English
- Budget: $25 million or £25 million
- Box office: $44.6 million

The Dark Crystal is a 1982 dark fantasy film directed by Jim Henson and Frank Oz, produced by Gary Kurtz and Henson, with a screenplay by David Odell based on a story conceived by Henson. The film was produced and financed by ITC Entertainment and The Jim Henson Company and distributed by Universal Pictures. It features the voices of Stephen Garlick, Lisa Maxwell, Billie Whitelaw, Percy Edwards, and Barry Dennen. Set on a fictional planet, the film revolves around Jen and Kira, two Gelflings on a quest to restore balance to the world of Thra and overthrow the evil, ruling Skeksis by restoring a powerful broken Crystal.

The film was promoted as the first major live-action motion picture without any human actors, featuring characters realized through groundbreaking animatronics created by Jim Henson's Creature Shop. Many creatures, such as the Gelflings, required as many as four puppeteers to achieve full movement and expression. In addition to directing, Henson and Oz also performed several characters alongside regular Muppets collaborators Kathryn Mullen, Dave Goelz, Steve Whitmire, and Louise Gold. The primary concept artist was fantasy illustrator Brian Froud, famous for his distinctive fairy and dwarf designs; Froud later collaborated with Henson on his subsequent fantasy film Labyrinth (1986). The film score was composed by Trevor Jones.

The Dark Crystal initially received mixed reviews from mainstream critics; while being criticized for its darker, more dramatic tone in contrast to Henson's previous works, it was praised for its narrative, production design, and characters. Over the years, it has been re-evaluated by critics and has garnered a cult following.

An Emmy Award-winning prequel television series, The Dark Crystal: Age of Resistance, premiered on Netflix in 2019 and ran for one season.

== Plot ==
On the blighted planet Thra 1,000 years earlier, a powerful crystal cracked and two new races appeared: the cruel Skeksis, who use the crystal's power to extend their lives, and gentle Mystics, the urRu, (Note: The Mystics are called "urRu" once on-screen as they enter the crystal chamber.) who dwell in a secluded valley. Among the Mystics is Jen, a young Gelfling adopted after the Skeksis slaughtered his clan. As the Great Conjunction of the world's three suns draws near, the dying Mystic Master instructs Jen to fulfill a prophecy to heal the crystal by first retrieving a missing shard from the oracle Aughra. If Jen fails to complete his quest before the three suns meet, the Skeksis will rule forever. The Master then dies, and the Skeksis Emperor dies simultaneously. The Skeksis General successfully challenges the Chamberlain for succession in a "trial by stone" and banishes him from the castle. When the Skeksis learn of Jen's existence, they send their army of giant crab-like Garthim to capture him, with the cunning Chamberlain following.

Jen meets Aughra and enters her orrery. Offered several shards, he chooses one that responds when he plays the Mystics' chord on his flute. Before Aughra can explain Jen's mission, the Garthim arrive and destroy the orrery, taking Aughra prisoner as Jen flees. Hearing the crystal's call, the Mystics leave their valley and journey to the castle. On his journey through a forest swamp, Jen meets Kira, a female Gelfling. The two learn more about each other when they accidentally "dreamfast", sharing each other's memories. They stay for a night with the Podlings who raised Kira, only for them and Kira's pet Fizzgig to flee when the Garthim raid the village. They are nearly caught, but the Chamberlain orders the Garthim back.

Jen and Kira discover a ruined Gelfling city where a prophecy is inscribed:

"When single shines the triple sun,
What was sundered and undone
Shall be whole, the two made one
By Gelfling hand or else by none."

Jen realizes that he must take the shard to the castle. The Chamberlain approaches and begs them to come to the castle with him. The Gelflings flee and reach the castle on Landstriders, intercepting the Garthim that raided Kira's village. They attack to free the Podlings but are cornered. Kira grabs Jen and Fizzgig and reveals wings, an attribute possessed only by female Gelfling, that she uses to glide into the castle's dry moat. They enter the castle through the catacombs while, above, the Skeksis Scientist uses the crystal's rays to extract vital essence from Podlings. The Emperor drinks the essence and finds that it has only temporary restorative effects, unlike Gelfling essence which was more potent. The Chamberlain tries again to seize the Gelflings, and Jen stabs his hand with the shard; elsewhere the Mystic Chanter notices a wound on his hand. Enraged, the Chamberlain buries Jen in a cave-in and takes Kira as a gift to the Emperor. The Emperor reinstates him and orders Kira drained of essence. Aughra, imprisoned in the laboratory, tells Kira to call the captive animals for help. They break free and attack the Scientist, who deflects the draining prism before falling into the fiery crystal shaft; on a rocky plain, the Mystic Alchemist vanishes in flames. Aughra frees herself while Jen, awakened by Kira's call, climbs up the shaft to the laboratory.

The Gelflings make their way to a hall overlooking the crystal chamber, where the Skeksis gather for the conjunction ceremony. When the Skeksis spot them and order the Garthim to attack, Jen leaps onto the crystal but drops the shard. Kira glides down to the chamber, grabs the shard and throws it to Jen before the High Priest stabs her fatally. As the suns align Jen plunges the shard into the crystal, producing a force that throws him aside. The Garthim disintegrate and the drained Podlings regain their vitality while the dark stone covering the castle crumbles to reveal a crystalline structure. The Mystics arrive and use the crystal's light to draw the Skeksis to themselves, merging into angelic urSkeks.

The urSkek leader tells Jen that they sundered themselves and damaged the crystal a thousand years ago, upsetting the world's balance. They revive Kira in gratitude and ascend toward the suns, leaving the crystal to light the rejuvenated world.

== Cast ==
- Jim Henson as:
  - Jen, a Gelfling raised by the Mystics and entrusted to restore the Dark Crystal. Stephen Garlick provides the voice of Jen.
  - The High Priest, a Skeksis ritual master. Jerry Nelson provides the voice of the High Priest.
  - The Emperor, the incumbent Skeksis emperor who dies at the beginning of the film. Nelson provides the voice of the Emperor.
- Kathryn Mullen as Kira, a Gelfling raised by the Podlings who joins Jen's quest. Lisa Maxwell provides the voice of Kira.
- Frank Oz as:
  - Aughra, the Keeper of Secrets and an astronomer. Billie Whitelaw provides the voice of Aughra.
  - Chamberlain, a conniving Skeksis official who covets the throne. Barry Dennen provides the voice of Chamberlain.
- Dave Goelz as:
  - Fizzgig, a dog-like animal that is Kira's loyal pet. Percy Edwards provides the voice of Fizzgig.
  - The General, the easily angered Skeksis Garthim-Master who becomes the new Emperor. Michael Kilgarriff provides the voice of the General.
- Steve Whitmire as the Scientist, a Skeksis researcher of the crystal's power and ways to exploit the world's creatures.
- Louise Gold as Gourmand, the Skeksis organizer of banquets. Thick Wilson provides the voice of Gourmand.
- Brian Muehl as:
  - Ornamentalist, the Skeksis designer of garments and decor.
  - urZah, the Mystic Ritual-Guardian. Seán Barrett provides the voice of urZah.
  - The Mystic Master, who dies at the beginning of the film imparting wisdom to Jen.
- Bob Payne as the Scroll Keeper, the Skeksis castle historian. John Baddeley provides the voice of the Scroll Keeper.
- Mike Quinn as the Slave-Master, the Skeksis overseer of the drained Podlings. David Buck provides the voice of the Slave-Master.
- Tim Rose as the Treasurer, a soft-spoken Skeksis who keeps the castle's riches. Charles Collingwood provides the voice of the Treasurer.
- Jean Pierre Amiel as the Mystic Weaver
- Hugh Spight as the Mystic Cook
- Robby Barnett as the Mystic Numerologist
- Swee Lim as the Mystic Hunter (Note: Though credited as The Hunter, Lim portrays urNol the Herbalist. A hunter Mystic would not be introduced until The Dark Crystal: Age of Resistance, where he is named urVa the Archer, counterpart to skekVar the Hunter.)
- Simon Williamson as the Chanter, Mystic counterpart of the Chamberlain
- Hus Levant as the Mystic Scribe
- Toby Philpott as the Mystic Alchemist, counterpart of the Scientist
- David Greenaway and Richard Slaughter as the Healer
- Joseph O'Conor as the Narrator and voices of the urSkeks.

Kiran Shah, Mike Edmonds, Peter Burroughs, Malcolm Dixon, Sadie Corré, Deep Roy, Jack Purvis, Gerald Stadden, Mike Cottrell, John Ghavan, Abbie Jones, Natasha Knight, and Lisa Esson are credited as additional performers with Shah providing the stunt body doubles for Jen, Kira, and Aughra. Miki Iveria, Patrick Monckton, Sue Weatherby, and Dennen also provide the voices for the Podlings.

== Production ==
=== Development ===
The spiritual kernel of The Dark Crystal is heavily influenced by Seth. I've always felt that the idea of perfect beings split into a good mystic part and an evil materialistic part which are reunited after a long separation is Jim's response to the teachings of that book. Jim admitted that he didn't understand the book himself, and that everyone would understand it—or not understand it—in their own way. But he thought it opened up a whole different way of looking at reality, which I think was one of his goals in the making of The Dark Crystal.

— Screenwriter David Odell

Jim Henson's inspiration for the visual aspects of the film came around 1975–76, after he saw an illustration by Leonard B. Lubin in a 1975 edition of Lewis Carroll's poetry showing crocodiles living in a palace and wearing elaborate robes and jewelry. The film's conceptual roots lay in Henson's short-lived The Land of Gorch, which also took place in an alien world with no human characters. According to co-director Frank Oz, Henson's intention was to "get back to the darkness of the original Grimms' Fairy Tales", as he believed that it was unhealthy for children to never be afraid.

Henson formulated his ideas into a 25-page story he entitled "The Crystal", which he wrote whilst snowed in at an airport hotel. Henson's original concept was set in a world called Mithra, a wooded land with talking mountains, walking boulders and animal-plant hybrids. The original plot involved a malevolent race called the Reptus group, which took power in a coup against the peaceful Eunaze, led by Malcolm the Wise. The last survivor of the Eunaze was Malcolm's son Brian, who was adopted by the Bada, Mithra's mystical wizards.

This draft contained elements in the final product, including the three races, the two funerals, the quest, a female secondary character, the Crystal, and the reunification of the two races during the Great Conjunction. "Mithra" was later abbreviated to "Thra", due to similarities the original name had with an ancient Persian deity. The character Kira was also at that point called Dee.

Most of the philosophical undertones of the film were inspired by Jane Roberts's collection of writings Seth Material, which Henson found very inspiring. Henson kept multiple copies of Seth Speaks, and insisted that Froud and screenwriter David Odell read it prior to collaborating for the film. Odell later wrote that Aughra's line "He could be anywhere then", upon being told by Jen that his Master was dead, could not have been written without having first read Roberts' material.

The Bada were renamed "Ooo-urrrs", which Henson would pronounce "very slowly and with a deep resonant voice". Odell simplified the spelling to urRu, though they were ultimately named Mystics in the theatrical cut. The word "Skeksis" was initially meant to be the plural, with "Skesis" being singular, though the distinction was dropped early in the filming process. Originally, Henson wanted the Skeksis to speak their own constructed language, with the dialogue subtitled in English. Henson and Oz abstained from voicing their characters, believing their voices were too recognizable to audiences from their work on the Muppets.

Accounts differ as to who constructed the language, and on what it was based. Gary Kurtz stated that the Skeksis language was conceived by author Alan Garner, who based it on Ancient Egyptian, while Odell stated it was he who created it, and that it was formed from Indo-European roots. This idea was dropped after test screening audiences found the captions too distracting, but the original effect can be observed in selected scenes on the various DVD releases. The language of the Podlings was based on Serbo-Croatian, with Kurtz noting that audience members fluent in Slavic languages could understand individual words, but not follow entire sentences.

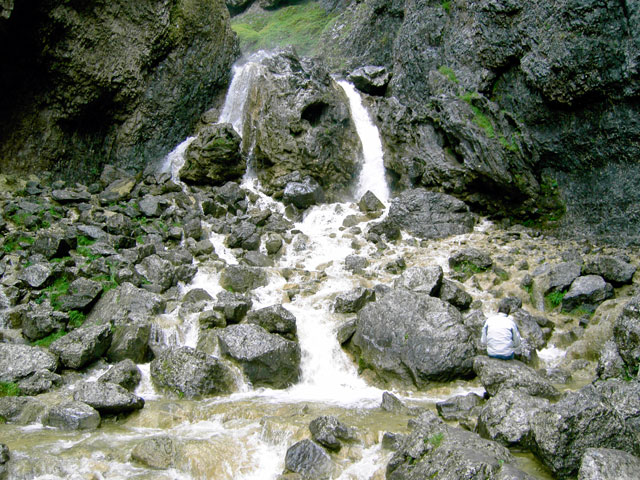
Gordale Scar, one of the locations used in filming

The film was shot at Elstree Studios from April to September 1981, with exterior scenes being shot in various locations: Scottish Highlands, Gordale Scar, North Yorkshire, and Twycross, Leicestershire. Once filming was completed, the film's release was delayed after Lew Grade sold ITC Entertainment to Robert Holmes à Court, who was skeptical of the film's potential, due to the bad reactions at the preview and the need to re-voice the film's soundtrack. The film was afforded minimal advertisement and release until Henson bought the film rights from Holmes à Court and funded its release with his own money.

=== Design ===
Brian Froud was chosen as concept artist after Henson saw one of his paintings in the book Once upon a time. The characters in the film are elaborate puppets, and none are based on humans or any other specific Earth creature. Before its release, The Dark Crystal was billed as the first live-action film without any humans on screen, and "a showcase for cutting-edge animatronics".

The hands and facial features of the ground-breaking animatronic puppets in the film were controlled with relatively primitive rods and cables, although radio control later took over many of the subtler movements. Human performers inside the puppets supplied basic movement for the larger creatures, which in some cases was dangerous or exhausting. Swiss mime Jean-Pierre Amiel led a team of dancers, acrobats and others in performing the Mystics, with Amiel himself performing the Weaver Mystic. Both Jen's dying Mystic master and the Ritual Guardian were performed by Brian Muehl, who was a recurring puppeteer on Sesame Street at the time. Many of the other Mystic performers would go on to work on the Star Wars film Return of the Jedi, as would two of the Skeksis' puppeteers, Mike Quinn (Slave Master) and Tim Rose (Treasurer).

When conceptualizing the Skeksis, Henson had in mind the seven deadly sins, though because there were ten Skeksis, some sins had to be invented or used twice. Froud originally designed them to resemble deep sea fish, but later designed them as "part reptile, part predatory bird, part dragon", with an emphasis on giving them a "penetrating stare." Each Skeksis was conceived as having a different "job" or function, thus each puppet was draped in multicolored robes meant to reflect their personalities and thought processes.

Each Skeksis suit required a main performer (from Jim Henson's main team of puppeteers, most of whom had previously worked on The Muppet Show), whose arm would be extended over his or her head in order to operate the creature's facial movements, while the other arm operated its left hand. Another performer would operate the Skeksis' right arm. A team of four technicians operated the Skeksis' hand and face animatronics. The Skeksis performers compensated for their lack of vision by having a monitor tied to their chests. The Chamberlain Skeksis, in particular, was built with 21 electronic components.

One Skeksis puppet, identified as "SkekZok", is displayed at the Museum of the Moving Image.

In designing the Mystics, Froud portrayed them as being more connected to the natural world than their Skeksis counterparts. Henson intended to convey the idea that they were purged of all materialistic urges, yet were incapable of acting in the real world. Froud also incorporated geometric symbolism throughout the film in order to hint at the implied unity of the two races. The Mystics were the hardest creatures to perform, as the actors had to walk on their haunches with their right arm extended forward and carrying the puppet's heavy headpiece. Henson stated he could hold a position in a Mystic costume for only 5–10 seconds.

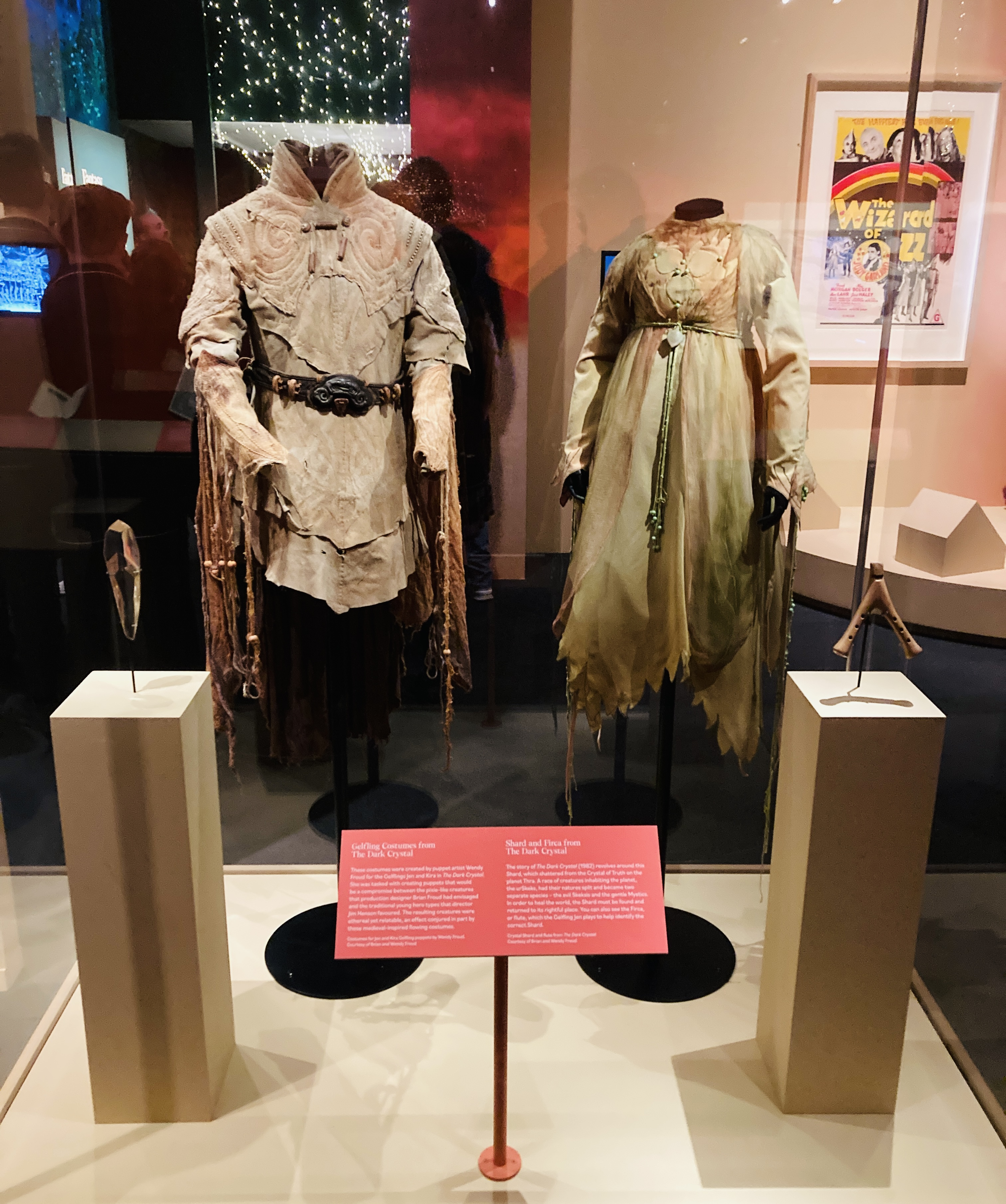
Gelfling costumes displayed at the British Library (2024)

The Gelflings were designed and sculpted by Wendy Midener. They were difficult to perform, as they were meant to be the most human creatures in the film, and thus their movements, particularly their gait, had to be as realistic as possible. During scenes when the Gelflings' legs were off-camera, the performers walked on their knees in order to make the character's movements more lifelike. According to Odell, the character Jen was Henson's way of projecting himself into the film. Jen was originally meant to be blue, in homage to the Hindu deity Rama, but this idea was scrapped early on.

Aughra was originally envisioned as a "busy, curious little creature" called Habeetabat, though the name was rejected by Froud, who found the name too similar to Habitat, a retailer he despised. The character was re-envisioned as a seer or prophetess, and renamed Aughra. In selecting a voice actor for Aughra, Henson was inspired by Zero Mostel's performance as a "kind of insane bird trying to overcome Tourettes syndrome" on Watership Down. Although the character was originally voiced by Oz, Henson wanted a female voice, and subsequently selected Billie Whitelaw.

The character Fizzgig was invented by Oz, who wanted a character who served the same function as the Muppet poodle Foo-Foo, feeling that, like Miss Piggy, the character Kira needed an outlet for her caring, nurturing side. The character's design was meant to convey the idea of a "boyfriend-repellant", to contrast the popular idea that it is easier to form a bond with a member of the opposite sex with the assistance of a cute dog.

The Podlings were envisioned as people in complete harmony with their natural surroundings, thus Froud based their design on that of potatoes. Their village was modeled on the Henson family home.

In designing the Garthim, Froud took inspiration from the discarded carapaces of his and Henson's lobster dinners. The Garthim were first designed three years into the making of the film, and were made largely of fiberglass. Each costume weighed around 70 pounds (30 kg), thus Garthim performers still in costume had to frequently be suspended on racks in order to recuperate.

The Dark Crystal was the last film in which cinematographer Oswald Morris involved himself in before retiring. He shot all the footage with a "light flex", a unit placed in front of the camera which gave a faint color tint to each scene in order to give the film a more fairy-tale atmosphere similar to Froud's original paintings.

=== Music ===
The film's soundtrack was composed by Trevor Jones, who became involved before shooting had started. Jones initially wanted to compose a score which reflected the settings' oddness by using acoustical instruments, electronics and building structures. This was scrapped in favor of an orchestral score performed by the London Symphony Orchestra once Gary Kurtz became involved, as it was felt that an unusual score would alienate audiences. The main theme of the film is a composite of the Skeksis' and Mystics' themes. Jones wrote the baby Landstrider theme in honor of his newly born daughter.

Early in development, Vangelis composed music for the film. A workprint used to determine which background music best suited the film was later discovered, containing two versions of the film, one scored by Jones and one by Vangelis, although the tape only had enough storage to preserve fifteen minutes of the version with Vangelis' score.

== Release and reception ==
=== Box office ===
The Dark Crystal was released in 858 theaters in North America on December 17, 1982, and finished third for the weekend with a gross of $4,657,335, behind Tootsie and The Toy, performing better than some people expected. In its initial weekends, it had a limited appeal with some audiences for various reasons, including parental concerns about its dark nature when contrasted with Henson's family-friendly Muppet franchise. In its third weekend, it moved up to second place nationally with a gross of $5,405,071 from 1,052 screens. It made $40,577,001 in its box office run, managing to turn a profit. The film became the 16th highest-grossing film of 1982 within North America. To date, it remains as one of the highest-grossing puppet films of all time, particularly for its domestic gross.

It made £2.4 million in the UK.

The Dark Crystal was re-released by Fathom Entertainment in select theaters on October 12 and 13, 2025.

=== Critical reception ===
The film received a mixed response upon its original release, but has earned a more positive reception in later years, becoming a favorite with fans of Henson and fantasy. Vincent Canby of The New York Times negatively reviewed the film, describing it as a "watered down J. R. R. Tolkien... without charm as well as interest." Kevin Thomas gave it a more positive assessment in the Los Angeles Times: "Unlike many screen fantasies, The Dark Crystal casts its spell from its very first frames and proceeds so briskly that it's over before you realize it. You're left with the feeling that you have just awakened from a dream." Richard Corliss of Time magazine wrote: "The invention is impressive, but there is little indication of the Henson-Oz trademark: a sense of giddy fun. Audiences nourished on the sophisticated child's play of the "Sesame Street" Muppets and the music-hall camaraderie of The Muppet Show may not be ready to relinquish pleasure for awe as they enter The Dark Crystal's palatial cavern." Variety praised the film as "a dazzling technological and artistic achievement ...that could teach a lesson in morality to youngsters at the same time it is entertaining their parents."

Gary Arnold of The Washington Post wrote the main characters were "the softest and potentially weakest figures" in the film, but nevertheless, "The Dark Crystal leaves no doubt that Jim Henson and his colleagues have reached a point where they can create and sustain a powerfully enchanting form of cinematic fantasy." Gene Siskel of The Chicago Tribune awarded the film 2 1/2 out of four stars in which he felt "...the resultant absence of dramatic tension cripples 'Crystal,' which doesn't have much going for it save for weird characters, who look like they just walked in from the bar scene in Star Wars. In fact, a lot of this movie looks like it was ripped off from Star Wars." Colin Greenland, reviewing for Imagine magazine, stated that "The Dark Crystal is a technical masterpiece with splendid special effects work by a team two dozen strong. It may be that they did well to keep the story simple and then lavish a wealth of detail on it, rather than go for a more complicated fantasy and fail."

John Nubbin reviewed The Dark Crystal for Different Worlds magazine and stated that "it very well may be that he who laughs last actually does laugh best. The Dark Crystal has all the earmarks of a winner, at exactly the time when we need one."

On Rotten Tomatoes, the film holds an approval rating of 78% based on 50 reviews, with an average rating of 6.6/10. The website's critical consensus reads: "The Dark Crystal's narrative never quite lives up to the movie's visual splendor, but it remains an admirably inventive and uniquely intense entry in the Jim Henson canon." On Metacritic it has a weighted average score of 66 out of 100 based on reviews from 13 critics, indicating "generally favorable reviews".

In 2008, the American Film Institute nominated this film for its Top 10 Fantasy Films list.

=== Accolades ===
Year	Award	Category	Nominee	Result	Ref.
1983	BAFTA Film Award	Best Special Visual Effects	Roy Field; Brian Smithies; Ian Wingrove	Nominated	
1983	Avoriaz Fantastic Film Festival	Grand Prize	Jim Henson; Frank Oz	Won	
1983	Hugo Awards	Best Dramatic Presentation	Jim Henson; Frank Oz; Gary Kurtz; David Odell	Nominated	
1983	Saturn Awards	Best Fantasy Film		Won	
1983	Saturn Awards	Best Special Effects	Roy Field; Brian Smithies	Nominated	
1983	Saturn Awards	Best Poster Art	Richard Amsel	Nominated	
2008	Saturn Awards	Best DVD Classic Film Release		Nominated	

=== Home media ===
The Dark Crystal was first released on VHS, Betamax, and CED by Thorn EMI Video in 1983. The company's successor HBO Video re-released it on VHS in 1988 and also released it in widescreen on LaserDisc for the first time. On July 29, 1994, Jim Henson Video (through Disney's Buena Vista Home Video) re-released the film again on VHS and on a new widescreen LaserDisc. On October 5, 1999, Columbia TriStar Home Video and Jim Henson Home Entertainment gave the film one final VHS release and also released it on DVD for the first time and it has had multiple re-releases since including a Collector's Edition on November 25, 2003, and a 25th Anniversary Edition on August 14, 2007. It was also released on UMD Universal Media Disc for PlayStation Portable (PSP) on July 26, 2005. It was released on Blu-ray on September 29, 2009.

Another anniversary edition of The Dark Crystal was announced in December 2017, with a brand-new restoration from the original camera negative, and was released on Blu-ray and 4K Blu-ray on March 6, 2018. Prior to the 4K/Blu-Ray release, Fathom Events presented the restored print of The Dark Crystal in US cinemas on February 25 and 28, and March 3 and 6, 2018.

On January 1, 2024, a worldwide distribution agreement signed between Shout! Studios and the Jim Henson Company for The Dark Crystal and Labyrinth as well as associated content went into effect. The agreement grants Shout! Studios streaming, video-on-demand, broadcast, digital download, packaged media and limited non-theatrical rights to the films. The company released the films on all major digital entertainment platforms on February 6, 2024.

== Novelization ==
A tie-in novelization of the film was written by A. C. H. Smith. Henson took a keen interest in the novelization, as he considered it a legitimate part of the film's world rather than just an advertisement. He originally asked Alan Garner to write it, but Garner declined on account of prior engagements. Henson and Smith met several times over meals to discuss the progress of the manuscript. According to Smith, their only major disagreement had arisen over his dislike of the Podlings, which he considered "boring". He included a scene in which a Garthim carrying a sackful of Podlings fell down a cliff and crushed them. Henson considered this scene to be an element of "gratuitous cruelty" that did not fit well into the scope of the story. In order to assist Smith in his visualizing the world of The Dark Crystal, Henson invited him to visit Elstree Studios during filming. In June 2014, Archaia Entertainment reprinted the novelization, with included extras such as some of Brian Froud's illustrations and Jim Henson's notes.

== Cancelled sequel ==
During the development phase of The Dark Crystal, director Jim Henson and writer David Odell discussed ideas for a possible sequel. Almost 25 years later, Odell and his wife Annette Duffy pieced together what Odell could recall from these discussions to draft a script for The Power of the Dark Crystal. Genndy Tartakovsky was initially hired in January 2006 to direct and produce the film through The Orphanage animation studios in California.

However, faced with considerable delays, the Jim Henson Company announced a number of significant changes in a May 2010 press release: It was going to partner with Australia-based Omnilab Media to produce the sequel, screenwriter Craig Pearce had reworked Odell and Duffy's script, and directing team Michael and Peter Spierig were replacing Tartakovsky. In addition, the film would be released in stereoscopic 3D.

During a panel held at the Museum of the Moving Image on September 18, 2011, to commemorate the legacy of Jim Henson, his daughter Cheryl revealed that the project was yet again on hiatus. By February 2012 Omnilab Media and the Spierig brothers had parted ways with the Henson Company due to budgetary concerns; production on the film has been suspended indefinitely. In May 2014, Lisa Henson confirmed that the film was still in development, but it was not yet in pre-production.

Ultimately, plans for a feature film were scrapped, and the unproduced screenplay was adapted into a 12-issue comic book series The Power of the Dark Crystal from Archaia Comics and BOOM! Studios, released in 2017.

== Spin-offs ==
=== Prequel comics ===
Legends of the Dark Crystal, an original English-language manga written by Barbara Kesel with art by Heidi Arnhold, Jessica Feinberg, and Max Kim, was published by Tokyopop. Its story is set hundreds of years before the events of The Dark Crystal, after the Great Conjunction which saw the splitting of the urSkeks into the Mystics and the Skeksis, but before the extermination of the Gelflings. The first volume of the series came out November 2007, followed sometime later by the second in August 2010. A third installment had been originally planned but was canceled and subsequently merged into the second volume.

Another comic book prequel, The Dark Crystal: Creation Myths, was published by Archaia Entertainment as a series of three graphic novels. The Henson Company and Archaia began collaborating on this project in late 2009. A brief preview was made available on Free Comic Book Day in May 2011, and the first installment was released January 2012, shortly thereafter spending two weeks on The New York Times Best Seller list of hardcover graphic books. In February 2013, the second installment was officially released. The third and final part was released in October 2015.

=== Prequel novels ===
On July 1, 2013, an announcement was made by The Jim Henson Company, in association with Grosset and Dunlap (a publishing division of Penguin Group USA) that they would be hosting a Dark Crystal Author Quest contest to write a new Dark Crystal novel, as a prequel to the original film. It would be set during a Gelfling Gathering. The winning author was J.M. (Joseph) Lee of Minneapolis, Minnesota, whose story, "The Ring of Dreams," was selected from almost 500 contest submissions.

The novel series consists of four books: Shadows of the Dark Crystal, released on June 28, 2016; Song of the Dark Crystal, released July 18, 2017; Tides of the Dark Crystal, released December 24, 2018; and Flames of the Dark Crystal, released on August 27, 2019. Together, the novels serve to establish the setting of the Netflix series The Dark Crystal: Age of Resistance, focusing on adventures of some of the series' side characters.

=== Prequel series ===
In May 2017, it was announced that The Jim Henson Company in association with Netflix would produce a prequel series titled The Dark Crystal: Age of Resistance. Shooting began in the fall of 2017 with Louis Leterrier as director. The prequel was written by Jeffrey Addiss, Will Matthews, and Javier Grillo-Marxuach. The series premiered on August 30, 2019 and explores in ten episodes the world created for the original film.

== In other media ==
- A book entitled The World of The Dark Crystal, written and illustrated by Brian Froud, was released at the same time as the film. The book, written as the annotated translation of the Book of Aughra by fictional Oxford professor "J.J. Llewellyn", expands greatly on the world of "Thra", detailing its conditions and history, as well as providing some additional story background.
- An illustrated children's storybook version, The Tale of the Dark Crystal, written by Donna Bass and illustrated by Bruce McNally.
- A board game called The Dark Crystal Game was also released in 1982 by Milton Bradley.
- A book-and-cassette adaptation was released in 1983 by Disneyland Records as part of its Read-Along Adventures series.
- In 1983, a graphic adventure based on the film was released for the Apple II and Atari 8-bit computers.
- Marvel Comics published a comic book adaptation of the film by writer David Anthony Kraft and artists Bret Blevins, Vince Colletta, Rick Bryant, and Richard Howell in Marvel Super Special #24.
- Vogue commissioned six of the film's costume designers to fashion clothes based on the characters of the film.
- Music duo The Crystal Method used samples from the film in the song "Trip Like I Do", released on their 1997 album Vegas.
- In February 2011, Sandstorm Productions – a firm that partnered with various design studios to facilitate the development and distribution of board games and collectible card games – revealed that it had acquired the license to produce games based on various Henson properties, including The Dark Crystal. Before any definitive plans were made, however, Sandstorm went out of business in June 2012.
- Archaia announced plans for a role-playing game based on The Dark Crystal at the August 2011 Gen Con gaming convention, intending to publish it later the following year. Like its Origins Award-winning Mouse Guard game, The Dark Crystal was to be designed by Luke Crane and use mechanics similar to that of The Burning Wheel, but it was not released.
- In August 2013, Black Phoenix Alchemy Lab - a company that produces body and household blends with a dark, romantic Gothic tone - debuted the first of their licensed The Dark Crystal perfumes. The debut included four Skeksis blends: skekUng the Garthim-Master, skekNa the Slave-Master, skekTek the Scientist and skekZok the Ritual-Master.
- In the Jim Henson's Creature Shop Challenge episode "Return of the Skeksis", the competing creature designers had to work in teams of three to build a Skeksis that has been banished to different parts of Thra and has been called back to the Skeksis Castle.
- The song "Return to Oz" by the band Scissor Sisters on the album Scissor Sisters (2004) features a reference to the film's antagonists the Skeksis: The Skeksis at the rave meant to hide deep inside their sunken faces and their wild, rolling eyes, But their callous words reveal that they can no longer feel.
- The song "Skeksis" on the album Alien by Canadian band Strapping Young Lad is named after the film's antagonists; the song itself contains an interpolation of the film's theme melody. Singer-songwriter Devin Townsend would later base Ziltoid the Omniscient on the characters from the film.
- Dark Crystal Tales by Cory Godbey, a children's book of short stories, was released in August 2017.
- A book entitled The Dark Crystal: Age of Resistance: Inside the Epic Return to Thra was released in November 2019, two months after the Netflix series premiered. It details the making of the series and features concept art, interviews, set photography, and more.
- In October 2020, a guide to the characters and creatures from the Dark Crystal universe called The Dark Crystal Bestiary: The Definitive Guide to the Creatures of Thra was released.
- In January 2021, the River Horse company has announced that it is developing a role-playing game set in the world of both the original film and the Netflix prequel series called The Dark Crystal Adventure Game that was released in November 2024.
- In March 2021, it was announced that the Royal Opera House will adapt the film into a ballet entitled The Dark Crystal: Odyssey. It was directed and choreographed by Wayne McGregor with music by Joel Cadbury and is described as a "coming-of-age story" for family audiences. It ran from May 13 to June 4, 2023, under the name UniVerse: A Dark Crystal Odyssey.
- In the video game Lost Records: Bloom and Rage, a tape of the movie can be found in the character Swann’s room.

== See also ==
- The Land of Gorch
- John Bauer (illustrator)— an inspiration for Brian Froud's work on The Dark Crystal

== Bibliography ==
- "Jim Henson's The Dark Crystal". Archaia Titles. Hollywood, CA: Archaia Entertainment. July 11, 2011. Archived from the original on September 26, 2011.
- Arnhold, H. (January 2, 2010). "Comment on 'Excitement Can Be Suffocating' by *HeidiArnhold". heidiarnhold.deviantart.com. Los Angeles, CA: deviantART. Archived from the original on April 7, 2014.
- Bacon, M. (October 16, 1997). No Strings Attached: The Inside Story of Jim Henson's Creature Shop. New York City, NY: Macmillan. ISBN 978-0-02-862008-4. Archived September 4, 2019, at the Wayback Machine
- Canby, Vincent (December 17, 1982). "Review: Henson's Crystal". The New York Times. p. C10. ISSN 0362-4331. Archived from the original on November 29, 2014.
- Carroll, L. (October 4, 2006). "Dark Crystal Sequel Gives Jim Henson's Puppet Epic a Second Chance". MTV Movie News. New York City, NY: MTV Networks. Archived from the original on July 27, 2011.
- Falk, K. (2012). Imagination Illustrated: The Jim Henson Journal. Chronicle Books. ISBN 978-1452105826.
- "An Interview with Trevor Jones". Cinemascore. Randall D. Larson. May 24, 2011. Archived from the original on June 3, 2011.
- "Free Comic Book Day 2011 Gold Comic Books Announced". PREVIEWSworld. Timonium, MD: Diamond Comic Distributors. December 1, 2010. Archived from the original on May 10, 2013.
- Henson, J. & Oz, F. (dir.); Henson, J., Kurtz, G. & Lazer, D. (prod.); Henson, J. & Odell, D. (writ.) (December 17, 1982). The Dark Crystal (Motion picture). New York City, NY: Jim Henson Productions.
- Hill, J. (October 12, 2011). "Jim Henson's Family and Fans Aim to Honor and Extend His Creative Legacy – Part 2". HuffPost Entertainment. New York City, NY: The Huffington Post. Archived from the original on December 14, 2011.
- "Sandstorm Nets Marvel, Henson Licenses". Madison, WI: ICv2. February 1, 2011. Archived from the original on April 14, 2013.
- "Dark Crystal RPG from Archaia Entertainment". Madison, WI: ICv2. August 24, 2011. Archived from the original on December 18, 2011.
- "Genndy Tartakovsky to direct Power of the Dark Crystal" (PDF). Henson Media Relations: Press Releases. Hollywood, CA: The Jim Henson Company. February 1, 2006. Archived (PDF) from the original on March 2, 2016.
- "The Dark Crystal". Henson Productions: Fantasy & Sci Fi. Hollywood, CA: The Jim Henson Company. December 19, 2008. Archived from the original on September 24, 2015.
- "Omnilab Media and The Jim Henson Company join forces to launch the Australian feature production of the highly anticipated Power of the Dark Crystal" (PDF). Henson Media Relations: Press Releases. Hollywood, CA: The Jim Henson Company. May 4, 2010. Archived (PDF) from the original on January 17, 2016.
- User: J. Richardson (August 5, 2011). "Thread: The Dark Crystal RPG". RPGnet tabletop roleplaying forum. Berkeley, CA: Skotos Tech. Archived from the original on May 10, 2013.
- Rickitt, R. (October 1, 2000). Special Effects: The History and Technique. New York City, NY: Billboard Books. ISBN 978-0-8230-7733-5.
- Scheib, R. (May 2010). "Review: The Dark Crystal". Moria: The Science Fiction, Horror and Fantasy Film Review. Christchurch, NZ. Archived from the original on July 24, 2011.
- Swift, B. (February 8, 2012). "The Dark Crystal Sequel, The Power of the Dark Crystal, on Hiatus". If Magazine. Glebe, NSW, Australia: The Intermedia Group. Archived from the original on February 12, 2013.
- Thomas, Kevin (December 17, 1982). "'Dark Crystal': A Jen-uine Triumph?". Los Angeles Times. p. K10. ISSN 0458-3035. Archived from the original on June 2, 2021 – via Newspapers.com.
- Von Gunden, K. (January 7, 1989). "The Dark Crystal: Other Worlds, Other Times". Flights of Fancy: The Great Fantasy Films. Jefferson, NC: McFarland & Company. pp. 30–44. ISBN 978-0-7864-1214-3. Archived from the original on July 4, 2014.
- Warmoth, B. (March 1, 2010). "Jim Henson Company Confirms Dark Crystal and Labyrinth Comics Following Fraggle Rock". MTV Splash Page. New York City, NY: MTV Networks. Archived from the original on November 5, 2011.
- Wright, A. (November 2005). Conrich, I.; Hammerton, J (eds.). "Selling the Fantastic: The marketing and merchandising of the British fairytale film in the 1980s". Journal of British Cinema and Television. 2 (2). Edinburgh, Scotland, UK: Edinburgh University Press: 256–274. doi:10.3366/JBCTV.2005.2.2.256. ISSN 1743-4521.
- Gaines, Caseen (2017). The Dark Crystal: The Ultimate Visual History. San Rafael, United States: Insight Editions. ISBN 978-1-60887-811-6.
