= Michael Kilgarriff =

British actor, author and pianist

- Born: 16 June 1937 (age 89); Brighton, East Sussex, England
- Occupations: Actor, singer, author
- Years active: 1959–present
- Known for: Cyber Controller in Doctor Who
- Height: 6 ft 5 in (1.96 m)
- Spouse: Sarah Greatorex (m. 1968)
- Children: 1
- Website: www.michaelkilgarriff.co.uk

Michael Kilgarriff (born 16 June 1937) is a British actor, author and pianist from Brighton. As an actor, he is well known for his rich voice and height. His film and television roles include The Dark Crystal (1982) as the General, and the Doctor Who serials The Tomb of the Cybermen (1967), Tom Baker's début story Robot (1974–75) and Attack of the Cybermen (1985).

== Career ==
=== Acting ===
At six feet five inches (1.96 m) tall, he is sought for certain roles, such as the Cyber Controller in Doctor Who, a role he played in 1967 and 1985. He appeared in the same series as an Ogron (1973) and as the eponymous K1 Robot in the story Robot (1974–75).

He returned to play the K1 robot in the Big Finish Productions Bernice Summerfield audio adventure The Relics of Jegg-Sau. He did voice work for The Twelve Tasks of Asterix as Obelix, the Jim Henson movie The Dark Crystal (1982) as SkekUng, the Garthim master (Named "The General" in the movie), was film director Joe Steiner in the UFO episode "Conflict", and played the part of the Green King in the BBC Television serial The Moon Stallion (1978). In 1979, he provided voices for several characters in the cult television adventure series "Monkey" when it was dubbed into English. These were invariably gruff, often villainous characters, including warlords and demons.

=== Music ===
Kilgarriff is a music hall enthusiast, and wrote what is considered the definitive guide to music hall songs: Sing Us One of the Old Songs: A Guide to Popular Song from 1860–1920 (Oxford University Press, 1998). This work lists thousands of influential songs by singer, lyricist and composer. Kilgarriff himself was a regular performer at the legendary Players' Theatre Club in Villiers Street, Charing Cross, London, where he took the part of chairman many times as well as performing comic songs, accompanying at the piano and directing.

=== Writing ===
He wrote the 1968 BBC Radio adaptation of J. R. R. Tolkien's The Hobbit. He is also the author of many book dealing with drama, music hall tradition, and humour.

== Filmography ==
=== Film ===
Year	Title	Roles	Notes
1962	We Joined the Navy	Claude	
1967	Camelot	Sir Paul	Uncredited
1976	The Twelve Tasks of Asterix	Obelix	Voice only
1982	The Dark Crystal	General	Voice only
2007	Snow White: The Sequel	Hannibal The Ogre	Voice only
2008	Albert's Speech	Voice of God	Voice only

=== Television ===
Year	Title	Roles	Notes
1959	Whack-O!	Security escort	Episode #4.1
1959	The Golden Spur	King Edward IV	
1963, 1969	ITV Playhouse	Tiny; Lagarde	Episodes: "The Lads" "Colombe"
1963	Taxi!	Ron Farnes	
1965	Theatre 625	O'Grady	Episode: "The Physicists"
1967, 1973–1975, 1985	Doctor Who	Cyber Controller, Second Ogron, Robot	Episodes-Tomb of the Cybermen, Frontier in Space, Robot, Attack of the Cybermen
1970	UFO	Steiner	Episode: "Conflict"
1972	Aquarius	Father Christmas	Episode: "Down by the Greenwood Side – A Pantomime with a Difference"
1974	Men of Affairs	Jim Draper	Episode: "...As a New Born Babe"
1976, 1978	Jackanory Playhouse	Troll; Big Pete	Episodes: "Peter and the Princess" "Big Pete, Little Pete"
1977	The Upchat Line	Husband	Episode: "Pulling"
1978	The Moon Stallion	Green King	Episode #1.4 & #1.6
1981	The Borgias	Cardinal San Severino	Episode: "Part 1"
1986	Artists and Models	Sardanapalus	Episode: "Slaves of Fashion"
1987, 1988	The Storyteller	Pond Sprite; Lion	Episodes: "Fearnot" "The True Bride"
1989	The Jim Henson Hour	Thought Lion	Episode: "Musicians"
1991	Watt on Earth	Watt's Uncle	
1995	Oscar's Orchestra	Mr. Crotchit	Voice only
2002	Tipping the Velvet	Music Hall chairman	Episode #1.1

=== Video games ===
Year	Title	Roles
2014	Dark Souls II	Blacksmith Lenigrast

== Partial bibliography ==
- Kilgarrif, Michael (1970). Three Melodramas (Edited by). Samuel French. ISBN 978-0573000188.
- Kilgarrif, Michael (1972). It Gives Me Great Pleasure. Samuel French. ISBN 978-0573090363.
- Kilgarrif, Michael (1973). Three More Melodramas. Samuel French. ISBN 978-0573000195.
- Kilgarrif, Michael (1974). Best Service Jokes. Wolfe. ISBN 978-0723405900.
- Kilgarrif, Michael (1974). The Golden Age of Melodrama. Wolfe. ISBN 978-0723405146.
- Kilgarrif, Michael (1974). Make 'Em Laugh. Wolfe. ISBN 978-0723405207.
- Kilgarrif, Michael (1974). More Best Religious Jokes. Wolfe. ISBN 978-0723405399.
- Kilgarrif, Michael (1975). Best Foreigner Jokes. Wolfe. ISBN 978-0723406709.
- Kilgarrif, Michael (1975). Best Boss & Worker Jokes. Wolfe. ISBN 978-0723406723.
- Kilgarrif, Michael (1975). One Thousand Jokes for Functions. Wolfe. ISBN 978-0723406358.
- Kilgarrif, Michael (1975). Best Legal Jokes. Wolfe. ISBN 978-0723405917.
- Kilgarrif, Michael (1976). Best Teenager Jokes. Wolfe. ISBN 978-0723407010.
- Kilgarrif, Michael (1977). Music Hall Miscellany. Samuel French. ISBN 978-0573000133.
- Kilgarrif, Michael (1978). Comic Speeches for All Occasions. Futura. ISBN 978-0708814604.
- Kilgarrif, Michael (1979). Make 'Em Roar - Volume One. Samuel French. ISBN 978-0708814604.
- Kilgarrif, Michael (1980). Make 'Em Roar - Volume Two. Samuel French. ISBN 978-0573190056.
- Kilgarrif, Michael (1982). 1,000 Jokes for Kids. Ward Lock. ISBN 978-0706358254.
- Kilgarrif, Michael (1985). Doctors and Nurses Joke Book. Littlehampton Book Services. ISBN 978-0706363883.
- Kilgarrif, Michael (1986). 5001 Jokes for Kids. Ward Lock. ISBN 978-0706364309.
- Kilgarrif, Michael (1987). Oh No! Not Another 1,000 Jokes for Kids. Ballantine. ISBN 978-0345340351.
- Kilgarrif, Michael (1996). It Gives Me Further Pleasure. Samuel French. ISBN 978-0573190070.
- Kilgarrif, Michael (1998). Grace, Beauty & Banjos. Oberon Books. ISBN 978-1840020083.
- Kilgarrif, Michael (2010). Back Stages. CallioViva. ISBN 978-0857780478.
