= The World of the Dark Crystal =

- Author: J. J. Llewellyn
- Illustrator: Brian Froud
- Publisher: Alfred A. Knopf, Inc (1982) Mitchell Beazley (1983); Harry N. Abrams, Inc (2003); Pavilion Books (2003); Insight Editions (2020); Titan Books Limited (2020)
- Publication date: 1982
- ISBN: 0810945797 (May 1, 2003 Collector's Edition); ISBN 1862056242 (September 26, 2003 edition)
- OCLC: 51336347
- Dewey Decimal: 741.6/4/092 21
- LC Class: NC978.5.F76 A4 2003

The World of the Dark Crystal is a non-fiction companion book written to give background information for the film The Dark Crystal. The book was designed and edited by Rupert Brown, with illustrations by Brian Froud—who was the conceptual designer for the film, and text by Oxford professor J. J. Llewellyn. The book was originally published in 1982 by Alfred A. Knopf, Inc. And over twenty years later, in 2003 the book was re-released by Harry N. Abrams, Inc.

The book contains many sketches and art concepts drawn by Brian Froud. It is in this book that the names of the Skeksis, the UrRu, the UrSkeks, and many of the creatures created in The Dark Crystal are introduced.

This article includes sections covering the book's text, sketches and art, awards and honors, re-release, fan-base, and sources.

== Contents ==
Text:

The book claims to be Aughra's account of the film's backstory, interspersed with in-universe descriptions of various props and their roles in the fictional universe itself. Among the concepts explored are numerology, symbology, and periodic references to Aughra's origin.

The book also explains the creation of the fictional universe—its history and culture, and the fictional creatures within that universe. Additionally, within this book, J.J. Llewellyn reveals an archeological find that inspired Brian Froud's designs and illustrations.

Sketches and Art:

The book features sketches, art, and sculptures, from the film's design concepts, by British artist Brian Froud. Froud is known for his mystical art style, and his ability to create fantastic creatures and worlds. He is most well known for his work on The Dark Crystal. Froud's art is often described as whimsical with a dark twist.

== Awards and honors ==
The book was a finalist for the 1983 Hugo Award for Best Non-Fiction Book.

== Re-release ==
In 2003, a collector's edition of the book was released. Unreleased sketches and art became publicly available for the first time within this special edition of the book. Also, within this re-release of the book, a small 20-page pamphlet titled The Crystal is included. This pamphlet contained the original concept design and story pitched to financial backers before the film went into full production. Four years after The Crystal was created, the film was released in theatres.

== Fan-base ==
Following the film, The Dark Crystal, the fan-base for this fictional universe continued to grow leading to novelization, a television series, and fan fiction.

For several years, The World of the Dark Crystal was a rare book to find. As fans continued to seek out the book, lack of availability increased the book's price. However, soon after the film celebrated its 20th anniversary, the book went back into production. This resulted in an increase in availability and a decrease in cost. In 2025 the book can be easily located and purchased online for around $50.

The World of the Dark Crystal continues to be a resource for The Dark Crystal film fans, as a non-fiction companion book written in conjunction with the film. This is supported by the book's contents, awards and honors, and re-release.
