= Toby Froud =

English-American artist and puppeteer (born 1984)

- Born: 27 June 1984 (age 41); London, England
- Education: Wimbledon School of Art
- Known for: Puppetry, special effects design, stop-motion sculpture
- Children: 1
- Parents: Brian Froud (father); Wendy Froud (mother)

Tobias Matthew Froud (born 27 June 1984) is an English-American artist, special effects designer, puppeteer, filmmaker, and performer. He rose to prominence for his role as the baby who was wished away to the goblins in the 1986 Jim Henson film Labyrinth. He became a puppeteer, sculptor, and fabricator for film, television, and theatre. He wrote and directed the 2014 fantasy short film Lessons Learned. He was the design supervisor of the 2019 streaming television series The Dark Crystal: Age of Resistance.

== Early life ==
Froud was born in 1984 in London, to English painter Brian Froud and American puppet-maker Wendy Froud. His maternal grandfather was the German-American sculptor Walter Midener (1912–1998), and his maternal grandmother was Margaret "Peggy" Midener (née Mackenzie; 1925–2016), a painter and collage artist in Michigan.

His parents met in 1978 while working on preproduction for the 1982 Jim Henson film The Dark Crystal, for which Brian was the conceptual designer and Wendy a puppet fabricator. They married in 1980. Froud was born during preproduction of his parents' second film with Henson, Labyrinth (released in 1986), and at the age of one he was featured in the film as the baby who is wished away to the Goblin King by his older sister Sarah. The name of the baby in the script had originally been Freddie, but was changed to Toby so as not to confuse Froud. Due to Labyrinth's popularity Froud has garnered a cult status and been described as one of the most famous babies in cinema and of the 1980s.

Froud was raised in Chagford, Devon, on the edge of Dartmoor. He developed an interest in puppetry from a young age due to exposure to his parents' artwork.

== Career ==
Froud apprenticed at the Muppet Workshop in New York in 1999, and in 2004 worked at Weta Workshop in New Zealand as a sculptor, fabricator, and miniature effects artist for the 2005 films The Chronicles of Narnia: The Lion, the Witch and the Wardrobe and King Kong. He graduated from Wimbledon School of Art in 2006 with a BA in technical arts and special effects.

In 2007 he built props and sets for the British children's television show What's Your News?, and created masks and puppets for the London theatre productions of Beauty and the Beast and Cinderella. Michael Curry Design Inc. in Portland, Oregon hired Froud in 2009 as a puppet fabricator and video artist on several productions, including Michael Jackson: The Immortal World Tour.

In 2010 Froud worked for Legacy Effects in San Fernando, California as a fabricator on the film Cowboys & Aliens. Since 2010, Froud has worked for the stop-motion animation studio Laika in Portland, sculpting and fabricating puppets for the studio's films ParaNorman (2012), The Boxtrolls (2014), Kubo and the Two Strings (2016) and Missing Link (2019).

Froud established the production company Stripey Pajama Productions, named for the outfit he wore as the baby in Labyrinth. He wrote and directed the 2014 fantasy short film Lessons Learned, produced by Heather Henson's company IBEX Puppetry for its Handmade Puppet Dreams series.

He served as a creature designer on the 2016 film I Am Not a Serial Killer, and alongside Heather Henson was executive producer of the 2017 film Yamasong: March of the Hollows.

Froud spent two years serving as design supervisor on the 2019 streaming television series The Dark Crystal: Age of Resistance, a prequel to The Dark Crystal, and in 2019 he began work as a puppet sculptor on the Guillermo del Toro film Pinocchio.

=== Performing arts ===
Froud's performance skills include stiltwalking and fire juggling. He performed in various productions with William Todd-Jones and music group Daughters of Elvin. He puppeteered as the opening act for Scissor Sisters at the 2005 Brit Awards, and has performed at Faerieworlds. As of 2007 and 2011, Froud was working as a stilt-walker and dancing bear with a troupe touring throughout England.

== Personal life ==
Froud is married and has a son, Sebastian. He resides in Portland, Oregon.

== Filmography ==
=== Film ===
Year	Title	Role	Credit	Notes
1986	Labyrinth	Toby Williams		Baby
2005	The Chronicles of Narnia: The Lion, the Witch and the Wardrobe		Sculptor/designer: Weta Workshop	
2005	King Kong		Crew member: Weta Workshop	Uncredited
2011	Cowboys & Aliens		Puppet fabricator: Legacy Effects	Uncredited
2012	ParaNorman		Character fabricator	
2014	The Boxtrolls		Sculptor and fabricator	
2014	Lessons Learned		Director, writer, production designer	Short film
2016	Kubo and the Two Strings		Sculptor	
2016	I Am Not a Serial Killer		Creature designer	
2017	Yamasong: March of the Hollows		Executive producer	
2019	Missing Link		Sculptor	
2022	Pinocchio		Puppet sculptor	

=== Television ===
Year	Title	Role	Credit	Notes
1987	Inside the Labyrinth	Self		Televised documentary
2012	Hollywood Treasure	Self		Episode. "Hunger for District 12"
2019	The Dark Crystal: Age of Resistance		Design supervisor	10 episodes
2019	The Crystal Calls – Making The Dark Crystal: Age of Resistance	Self		Streaming television documentary

== Awards ==
Year	Organisation	Category	Work(s)	Notes	Result
2014	Dragon Con Independent Film Festival	Best Animated Film	Lessons Learned (2014)		Won
2014	FilmQuest	Best Art Direction/Production Design	Lessons Learned (2014)	With Scott Foster	Won
2014	FilmQuest	Best Makeup Effects	Lessons Learned (2014)		Won
2014	FilmQuest	Best Fantasy Short Film	Lessons Learned (2014)		Nominated
2015	Pixie Awards	Visual Effects (Gold)	Lessons Learned (2014)		Won
2020	Visual Effects Society	Outstanding Special Effects in a Photoreal or Animated Project	The Dark Crystal: Age of Resistance — episode. "She Knows All the Secrets" (2019)	With Sean Mathiesen, Jon Savage and Phil Harvey	Won
