= Yamasong: March of the Hollows =

2017 dark fantasy film

- Directed by: Sam Koji Hale
- Written by: Sam Koji Hale; Ekaterina Sedia
- Produced by: Adamo Paolo Cultraro; Mallory O'Meara; Sultan Saeed Al Darmaki
- Cinematography: Alex U. Griffin
- Music by: Shoji Kameda
- Production companies: Dark Dunes Productions; Taormina Films
- Release date: September 2017 (Bristol Festival of Puppetry)
- Running time: 135 minutes
- Country: United States
- Language: English

Yamasong: March of the Hollows is a 2017 American puppet animated dark fantasy film directed by Sam Koji Hale, and written by Hale and Ekaterina Sedia. It was produced by Adamo Paolo Cultraro, Mallory O'Meara and Sultan Saeed Al Darmaki. A sequel to the 2010 short film Yamasong by Hale, Yamasong: March of the Hollows was produced by Dark Dunes Productions and Taormina Films. It had its world premiere at the Bristol Festival of Puppetry in September 2017.

== Plot ==
On the planet Yamasong, a mechanical tribe called the Hollows, led by the rebellious Yari, has taken devastating measures to fight against ravenous beasts known as the Tricksters. Shojun, a Terrapin warrior who works with the cyborg Nani, tries to rally together three different factions – the mechanical Hollows, reptilian Terrapins and the horned Ovis – as their internal conflict threatens the culture of Yamasong's organic species.

== Cast ==
- Nathan Fillion as Shojun
- Abigail Breslin as Nani
- Whoopi Goldberg as Yari
- Freida Pinto as Geta
- Peter Weller as Brujt
- Malcolm McDowell as Lord Geer
- George Takei as Elder Masook
- Ed Asner as Elder Pyreez
- Bruce Davison as P'Torr The Exile

== Production ==
Yamasong: March of the Hollows is a sequel to the 2010 short film Yamasong, created by writer-director Sam Koji Hale. Like the short film, March of the Hollows was made using puppet animation. The film was reportedly finished by May 2015.

== Release ==
Yamasong: March of the Hollows had its world premiere at the Bristol Festival of Puppetry in September 2017. It was released on video on demand on 23 April 2019 by Orchard Film.
