= Wendy Froud =

American artist

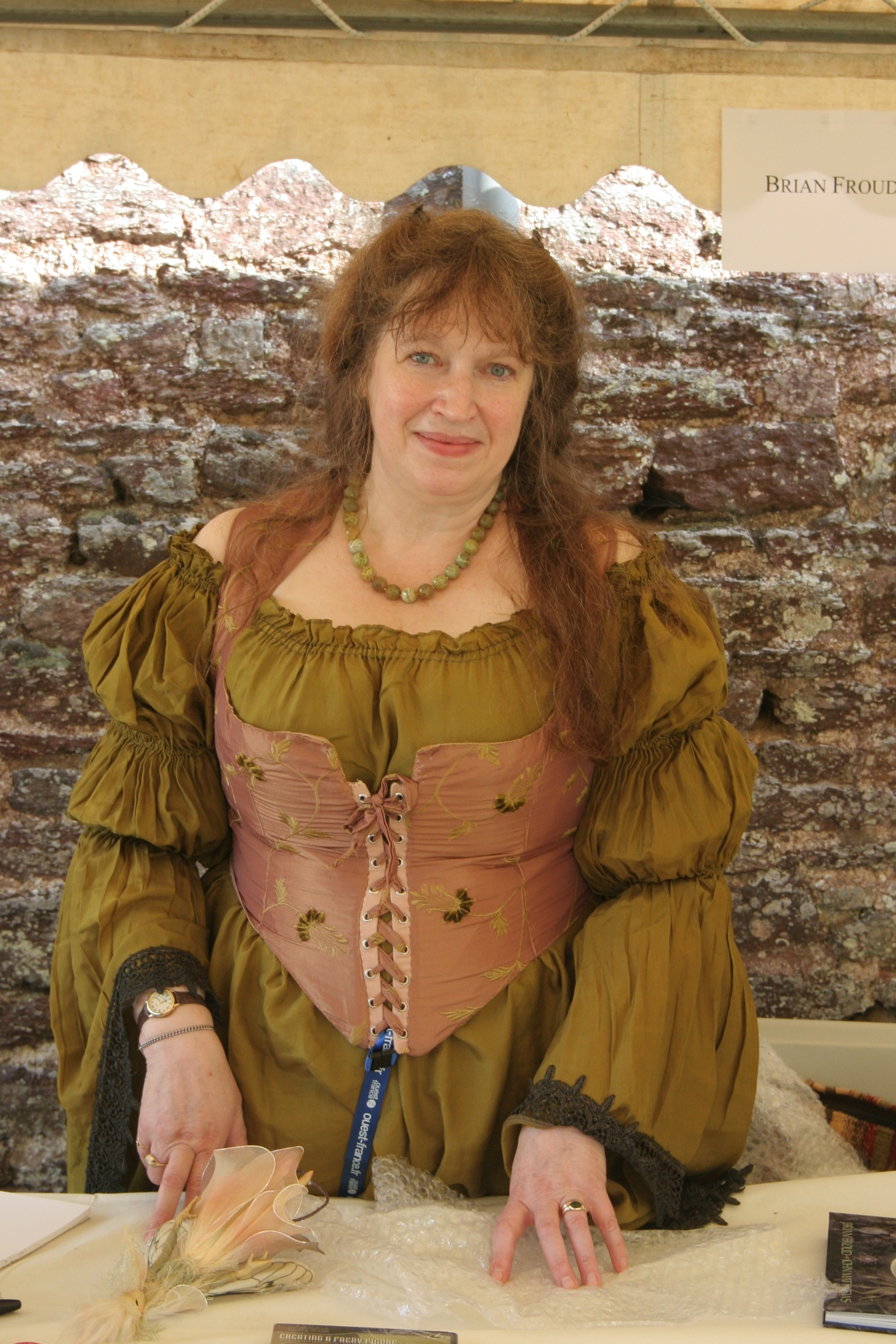
- Froud at the 2014 Rencontres de l’imaginaire de Brocéliande
- Born: 1954 (age 71–72); Detroit, Michigan, U.S.
- Known for: Doll-making, sculpting, puppetry, and writing
- Spouse: Brian Froud (m. 1980)
- Children: Toby Froud
- Awards: Inkpot Award (2001); Lifetime Achievement Award (Portland Film Festival 2015)

Wendy Froud (née Midener; born 1954) is an American doll-artist, sculptor, puppet-maker, and writer. She is best known for her work fabricating Yoda for the 1980 film Star Wars: The Empire Strikes Back, for which she has been called "the mother of Yoda", and creatures for the Jim Henson films The Dark Crystal and Labyrinth.

== Early life ==
Froud was born in Detroit, Michigan, in 1954 to painter and 3D-collage artist Margaret "Peggy" (née Mackenzie; 1925–2016) and sculptor and artist Walter Midener (1912–1998). Her father was a German expatriate and her mother was from Detroit.

Froud began making her own dolls from the age of five based on her favorite stories, including "lots of fauns, satyrs, centaurs and things with wings" from Greek mythology and fairy tales.

She studied art and music at the Interlochen Center for the Arts. She attended the College of Art and Design at the Center for Creative Studies, focused on fabric design and ceramics. She graduated with a BFA in Fine Arts in 1976.

== Career ==
After graduating, Froud moved to New York City, where The Muppets art director Michael Frith attended a gallery show of her dolls and bought several as Christmas presents for Jim Henson in 1978. Impressed by Froud's work, Henson recruited her to build puppets for his film The Dark Crystal. Froud designed and sculpted the film's two main protagonists, gelflings Jen and Kira. She went on to work on several other Henson projects including The Muppet Show, The Muppet Movie, and Labyrinth.

While working closely with Jim Henson and Frank Oz on various projects at the Henson Studios, Froud was asked by the pair to join the team responsible for developing and building the character Yoda for the 1980 Star Wars film The Empire Strikes Back. Her contribution included sculpting the prototype puppet for Yoda. Nick Maley, who worked on Yoda with Froud under Stuart Freeborn, recalled that "Wendy’s contribution creating the character was second only to Stuart who was overseeing all the creatures. She single handedly formed the body out of 1 inch sheet foam. She constructed the puppet armature from wooden dowel which gave structure to Yoda’s arms and legs. If I remember correctly, she modeled Yoda’s hands and feet and single handedly fabricated the 'stand-in Yoda', made entirely from cut foam, which was used to line up shots during camera setup. I do remember her spending some time working on the clay model of Yoda's head too." Froud later became referred to as "the mother of Yoda". She assisted in Yoda's puppeteering, controlling the pointed ears.

Wendy Froud worked on the 2009 animated documentary Mythic Journeys, sculpting and fabricating puppets based on designs by her husband Brian Froud.

Froud served as a concept, character, and costume designer for the 2019 Netflix series The Dark Crystal: Age of Resistance.

=== Books ===
Froud's artwork is featured in three books for children, paired with stories by fantasy author Terri Windling: A Midsummer Night's Faery Tale (1999), The Winter Child (2001), and The Faeries of Spring Cottage (2003). Her first solo art book, The Art of Wendy Froud, was published in 2006 by Imaginosis.

She is a writer of short fiction and poetry, published in two anthologies: Sirens and Other Daemon Lovers (1998) and Troll's-Eye View (2009). She collaborated as writer, with her husband Brian Froud as illustrator, on two books, The Heart of Faerie (2010) and Trolls (2012), both published by Abrams Books.

== Awards and nominations ==
In 2001, she and her husband were awarded the Inkpot Award by Comic-Con International. She has been nominated for the Chesley Award for Best Three-Dimensional Art twice: in 2001 for her piece, "Goth Faery", and in 2002 for "Narnia's Friend". She has won 4th place in the Locus Award for Best Artbook with her husband twice: for Trolls in 2013, and for Brian Froud's Faeries' Tales in 2015.

Froud received a Lifetime Achievement award at the Portland Film Festival in 2015. She was a finalist for the 2020 World Fantasy Award for Best Artist.

== Personal life ==
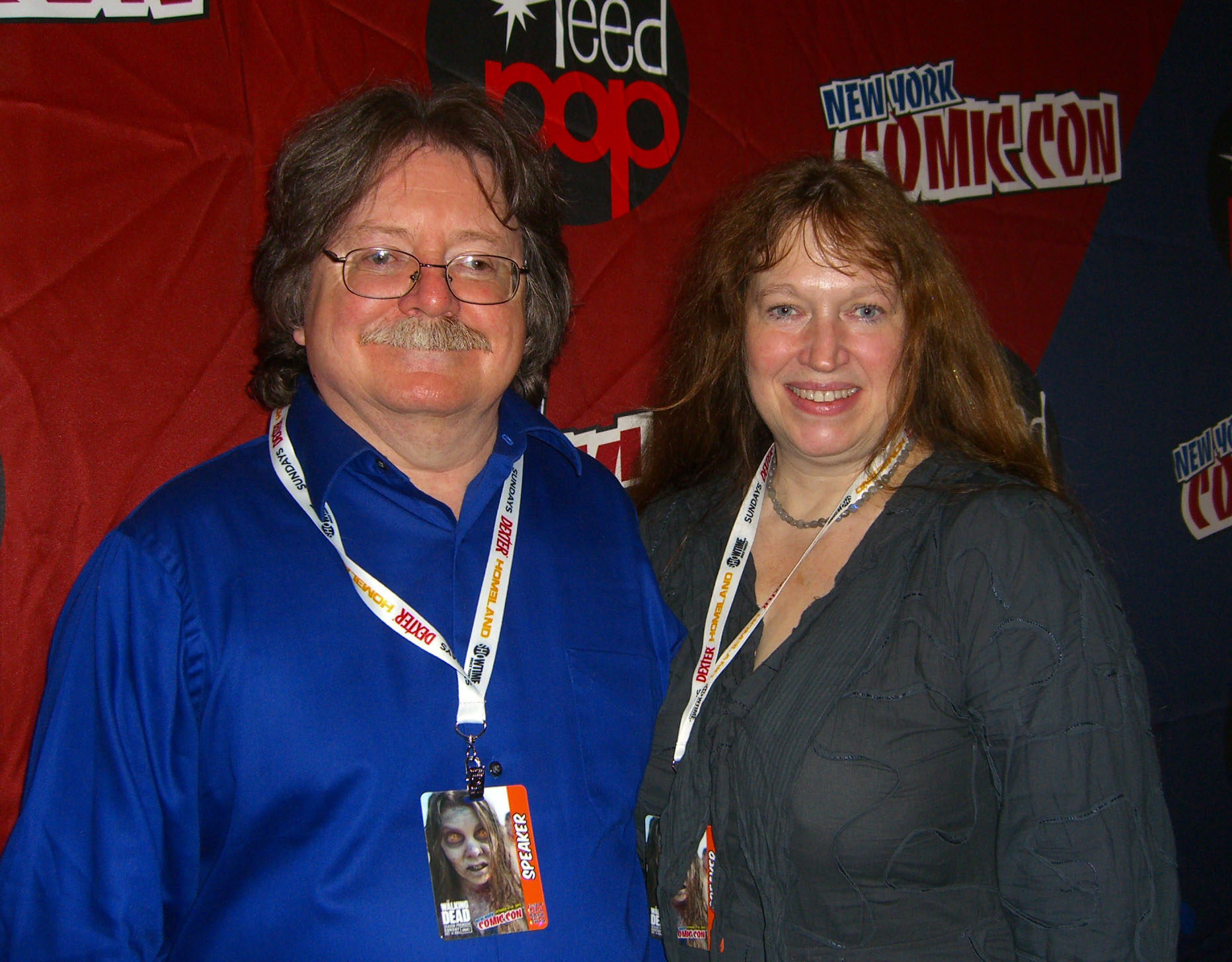
Wendy Froud with her husband, Brian Froud, at the New York Comic Con

Froud lives and works in Devon with her husband Brian Froud, whom she met in 1978 while working on The Dark Crystal, for which he was the conceptual designer. They married in 1980 in Chagford. Their son Toby is a visual artist, performance artist, and filmmaker. He starred in Labyrinth at the age of one, playing Sarah's baby brother Toby. Through her son, Froud has one grandson, Sebastian.

== Filmography ==
=== Film ===
- The Muppet Movie (1979) – muppet designer
- Star Wars Episode V: The Empire Strikes Back (1980) – fabricator ("Yoda")
- The Dark Crystal (1982) – creature design and fabrication supervisor ("Gelflings")
- Labyrinth (1986) – creature workshop artist ("Junk Lady", "Goblins", "Fairy Lichen" and "Birds")
- Mythic Journeys (2009) – character designer and fabricator
- Lessons Learned (2014) – script/story editor

=== Television ===
- The Muppet Show (1976-1982) – muppet designer for 5 episodes between 1978 and 1979
- The Dark Crystal: Age of Resistance (2019) – character/concept designer and assistant costume designer
