= Corrado (film) =

- Directed by: Adamo Paolo Cultraro
- Written by: Adamo Paolo Cultraro
- Produced by: Adamo Paolo Cultraro; Tom Sizemore; Lance Crayon
- Cinematography: David Fox
- Edited by: Paolo Viscomi
- Music by: Ryan Franks
- Release date: September 28, 2010
- Running time: 83 minutes
- Country: United States
- Language: English

Corrado (also known as Bad Ass) is 2009 film starring Tom Sizemore, Johnny Messner, Candace Elaine, and Edoardo Ballerini.

== Plot ==
A Los Angeles hit man, Corrado, is given the task of eliminating the aging kingpin Vittorio Spinello. He readily accepts the job and is about to perform the hit when he is interrupted by Spinello's new nurse, Julia. He shoots the aging Spinello by accident, instead of suffocating him as intended, and flees the scene. Julia is wrongly blamed for the death, and is herself about to be killed by Vittorio's son Paolo, when Corrado rescues her. They are then pursued all over Los Angeles by Paolo and his goons in a bid to escape.

== Cast ==
- Johnny Messner as Corrado
- Tom Sizemore as Paolo Spinello
- Candace Elaine as Julia
- Edoardo Ballerini as Salvatore
- Ken Kercheval as Vittorio Spinello
- Joseph Gannascoli as Frankie
- Frank Stallone as Tommaso
- Tony Curran as Officer Tony
- Stelio Savante as Antonio

== Reception ==
CineMagazine rated the film 2 stars. The film was also described as follows: "Solid, if rather simple, action thriller that is built on the usual components of the genre."
