= Characters and races of The Dark Crystal =

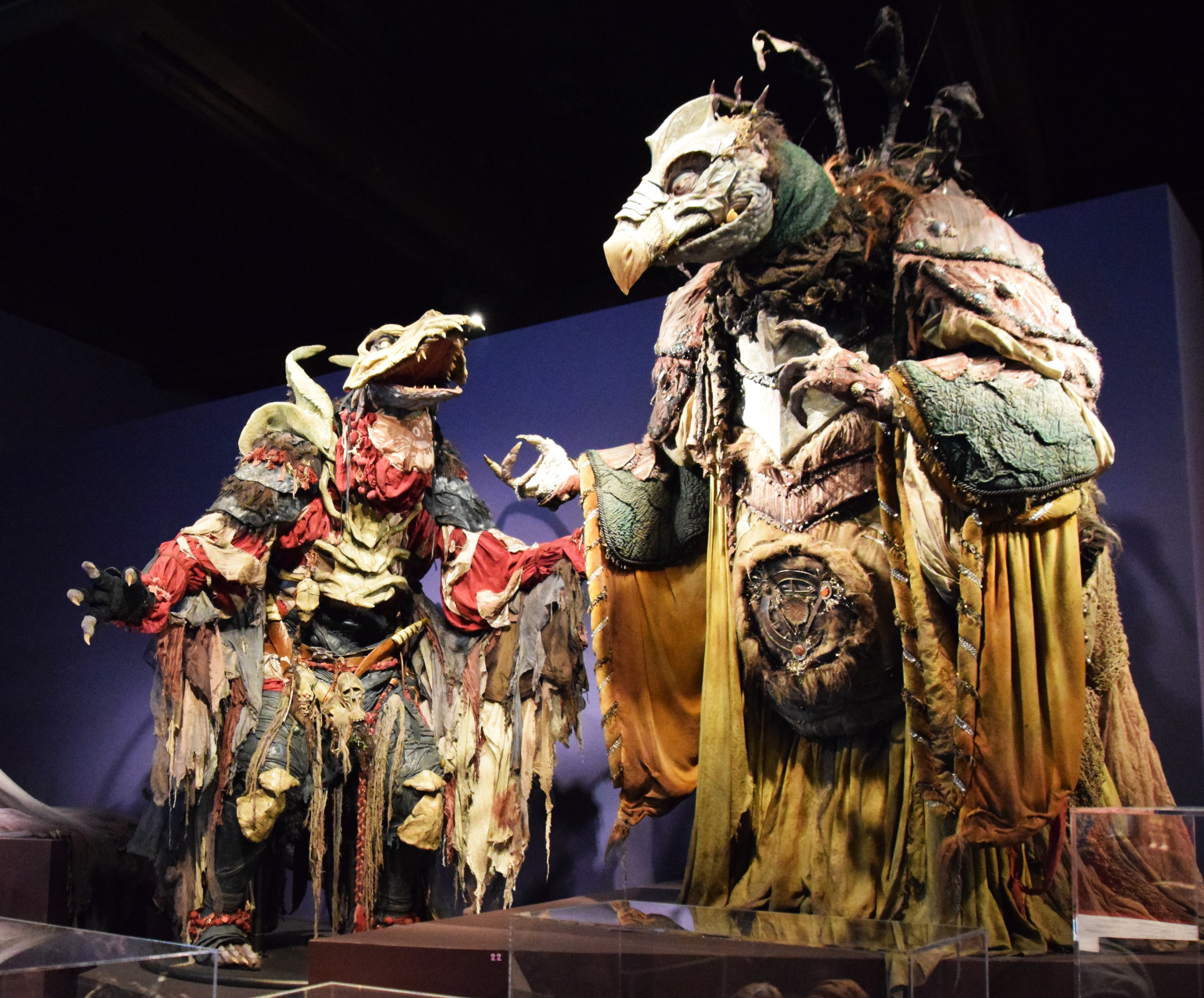
The Skeksis skekMal and skekVar

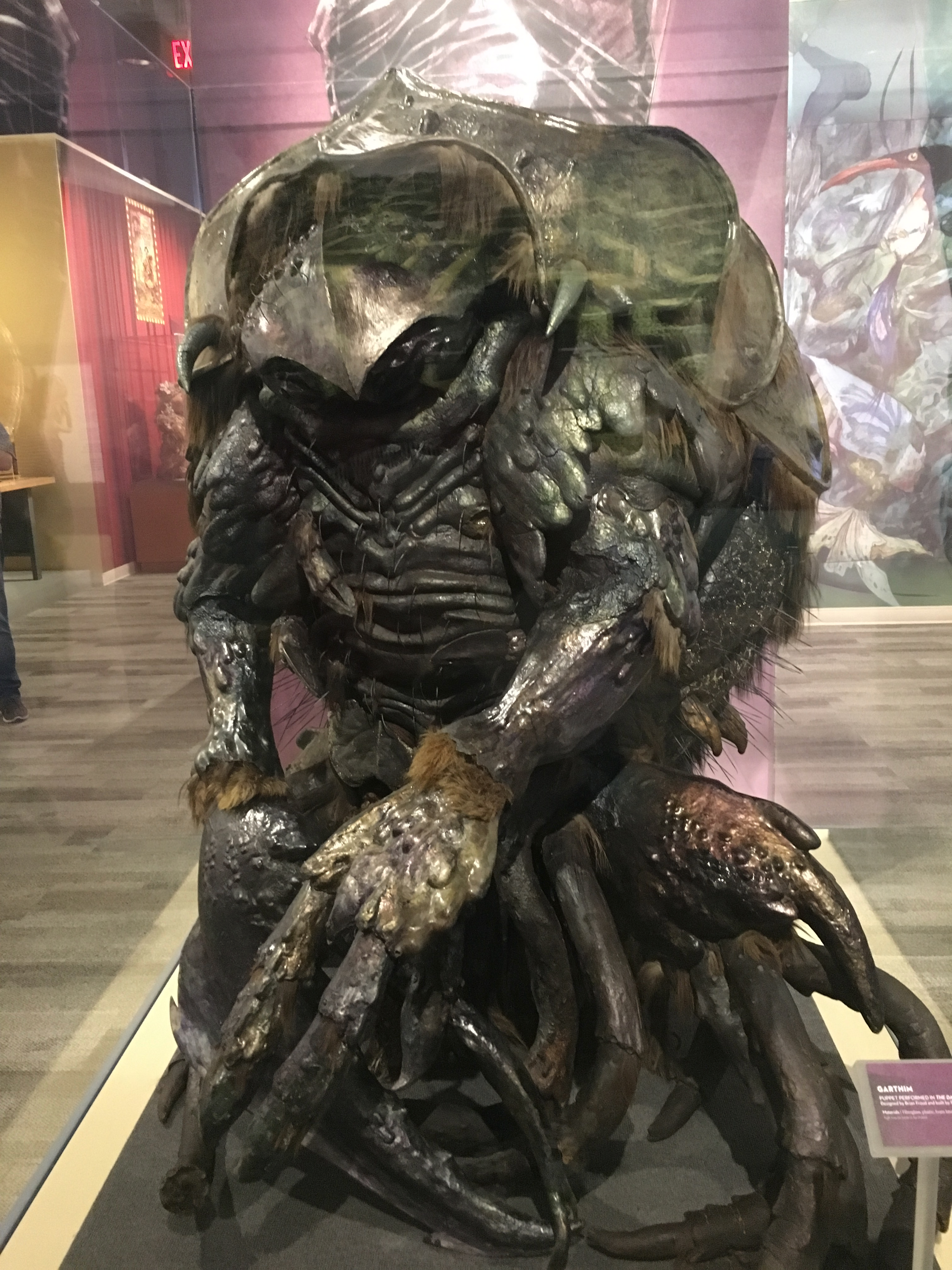
A Garthim

The characters from the 1982 cult fantasy film The Dark Crystal series were created by puppeteer Jim Henson and concept artist Brian Froud. Most of the information about specific characters and species names that were not mentioned in the film come from supplementary materials such as Froud's book The World of the Dark Crystal. The series expanded into books, comics, artwork, games, and the 2019 prequel series The Dark Crystal: Age of Resistance.

== Overview ==
List indicators
- A dark grey cell indicates that the character did not appear or that the character's presence has yet to be announced.
- A ^{Y} indicates a role as a younger version of character portrayed by another actor.
- A ^{U} indicates an uncredited role.
- A ^{C} indicates a cameo role.
- A ^{V} indicates a voice-only role.
- An ^{A} indicates an appearance through archival footage or stills.
- A ^{B} indicates the actor both puppeteered and voiced the character.
- An ^{M} indicates the actor was part of the main cast for the season.

Character	Voice actor	
Character	The Dark Crystal	The Dark Crystal: Age of Resistance
Character	1982	2019
Aughra	Billie Whitelaw	Donna Kimball^{M}
skekSo The Emperor	Jerry Nelson	Jason Isaacs^{M}
skekSil The Chamberlain	Barry Dennen	Simon Pegg^{M}
skekZok The Ritual-Master	Jerry Nelson	Keegan-Michael Key^{M}
skekTek The Scientist	Steve Whitmire^{B}	Mark Hamill^{M}
skekEkt The Ornamentalist	Brian Muehl^{B}	Alice Dinnean^{M}^{B}
skekAyuk The Gourmand	Thick Wilson	Harvey Fierstein^{M}
skekOk The Scroll-Keeper	John Baddeley	Neil Sterenberg^{M}^{B}
Fizzgig	Percy Edwards	Appeared
skekUng The Garthim-Master	Michael Kilgarriff	
skekNa The Slave-Master	David Buck	
skekShod The Treasurer	Charles Collingwood	
Jen	Stephen Garlick	
Kira	Lisa Maxwell	
urSu The Master	Brian Muehl^{B}	
Rian		Taron Egerton^{M}
Brea		Anya Taylor-Joy^{M}
Deet		Nathalie Emmanuel^{M}
Gurjin		Harris Dickinson^{M}
Seladon		Gugu Mbatha-Raw^{M}
Hup		Victor Yerrid^{M}^{B}
Tavra		Caitriona Balfe^{M}
Mayrin		Helena Bonham Carter^{M}
Naia		Hannah John-Kamen^{M}
Kylan		Shazad Latif^{M}
skekVar The General		Benedict Wong^{M}
skekLach The Collector		Awkwafina^{M}
skekMal The Hunter		Ralph Ineson^{M}
skekGra The Heretic		Andy Samberg^{M}
urGoh The Wanderer		Bill Hader^{M}
urVa The Archer		Ólafur Darri Ólafsson^{M}

== Major characters ==
=== Gelfling ===
Gelfling clan symbols. In clockwise order; Dousan, Drenchen, Sifa, Stonewood, Spriton, Grottan and Vapra. In the center is the Aureyal, the symbol of Gelfling unity.

The Gelfling are the central protagonists of The Dark Crystal franchise. They are slender, elvish humanoids with protracted facial structures who originally populated most of Thra, having three long fingers and a thumb on each hand. Female Gelfling have fairy-like wings that can be folded to fit easily under their clothing, allowing them to safely glide down from high places, even with the added weight of a second Gelfling holding onto them. The Marvel Comics adaptation of the film states that in the past, females could fly, but the wings have become vestigial. Gelfling also possess an ability called "dreamfasting" that allows them to psychically share thoughts, memories, and emotions through touch. The name "Gelfling" is a transliteration of Ghel-lflainnk, which means "those who live without knowledge of the future". This is due to their innocence and naïvety.

The Gelfling once had a flourishing civilization with a writing system similar to hieroglyphics, having relied on Aughra during the Age of Innocence before the urSkeks' arrival, which hastened their development while they venerated the aliens for their advancement. Initially, the Gelfling coexisted with the Skeksis before learning of their malevolent actions in using the Dark Crystal to drain the surrounding lands of their life essence to prolong their lives while using the extracted essence of their enslaved kinsmen for rejuvenation purposes.

This started the events of The Dark Crystal: Age of Resistance, which reveals that the Gelfling were organized as seven matriarchal clans who made their homes in areas of Thra consisting of the Stonewood Clan, the Spriton Clan, the Vapra Clan, the Grottan Clan, the Drenchen Clan, the Sifa Clan, and the Dousan Clan. Each of the Gelfling Clans is led by a leader called a "Maudra" and the ruler of all the clans is named "All-Maudra". Eventually, the Gelfling learned that one among them was destined to find the Shard and restore the Crystal to its natural state alongside the urSkeks during an upcoming Great Conjunction. When the Skeksis learned of this, they attempted using fabrications to deter the Gelfling before resorting to genocide with the newly created Garthim. By time of the events of the first film, only Jen and Kira had survived one such massacre as the former seeks to fulfill the prophecy. At the end of the first film, the two are entrusted with the Crystal by the urSkeks.

In the original film, it required four puppeteers to operate the Gelfling. In The Dark Crystal: Age of Resistance, the Gelfling puppets require only two puppeteers thus permitting greater freedom of movement. Also, while the animatronic components of the original film's Gelfling puppets were controlled via cables, the mechanical parts of the new Gelfling were remotely operated via a modified Wii controller.

==== Jen ====
The Dark Crystal character

Jen
- Species: Gelfling
- Gender: Male
- Home: Valley of the Stones
- Affiliations: The urRu
- Performed by: Jim Henson; Kathryn Mullen (assistant); Kiran Shah (certain full body stunts)
- Voiced by: Stephen Garlick; Cam Clarke (Audiobook)

Jen is a young male Gelfling and the protagonist of the film, having been raised by the urRu Master urSu from infancy when his family was slaughtered by the Garthim. His upbringing by the lax urRu made him both deliberate and impatient. Jen wears a pale, cream-colored tunic. His skin has a brown complexion and his hair is dark with fair (almost silver) streaks, and grows to shoulder-length. He carries a flute around his neck, which he is shown playing at intervals, and an urRu token known as a firca.

His creature and costume design were provided by Brian Froud and his designer and fabrication supervisor was Wendy Midener.

==== Kira ====
The Dark Crystal character

Kira
- Species: Gelfling
- Gender: Female
- Home: Podling village
- Affiliations: Podlings
- Performed by: Kathryn Mullen; Rollie Krewson (assistant); Kiran Shah (certain full body stunts); Steve Whitmire (assistant)
- Voiced by: Lisa Maxwell

Having escaped the slaughter of her people when hidden by her mother in a hollow tree trunk, Kira ended up wandering into a Podling village and was adopted by them. Taught by the Podlings, Kira learned to converse with wild animals and is given to wandering the swamps outside the Podling village, accompanied by Fizzgig. She is soft-spoken and gentle as a rule. Kira wears a golden-brown dress and a brown cloak. She has a fair complexion; her hair is long and fair, almost white; and she is always barefoot. As a female Gelfling, Kira has segmented fairy or butterfly-like wings that she can fold down her back: a physical feature not shared by male Gelflings. Although not shown in flight, she is twice seen using these wings to slow a fall.

Kira was designed by Wendy Froud (Nee Midener) and her design and fabrication supervisor was also Wendy Midener.

==== Vapra Clan ====
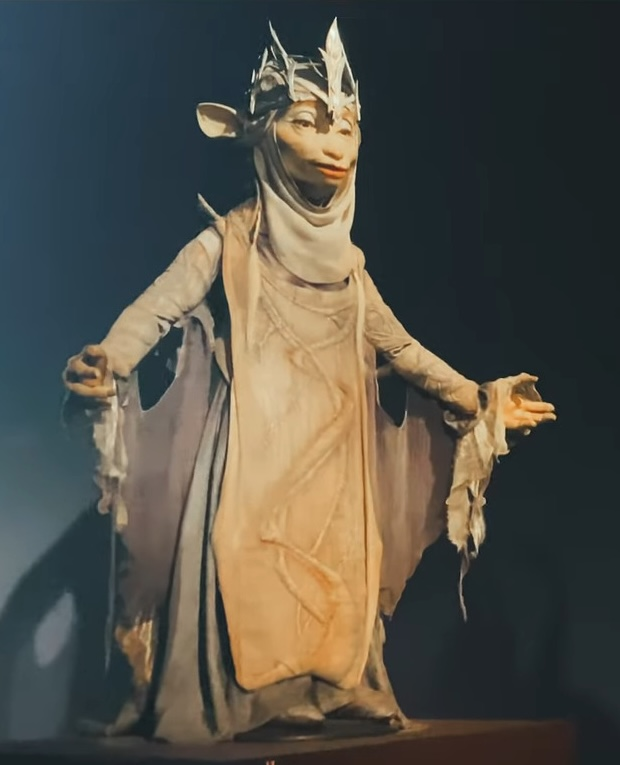
Mayrin

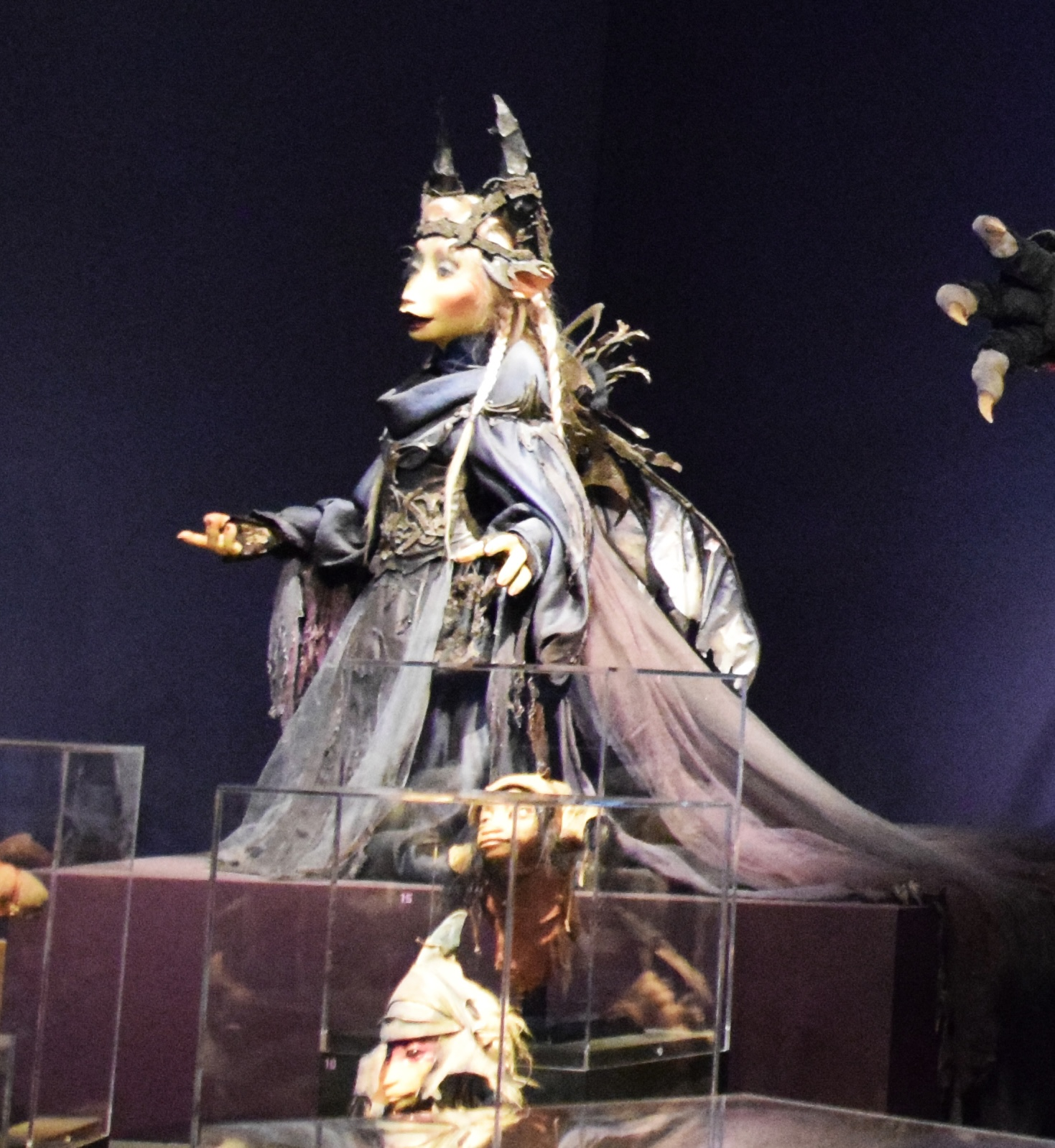
Seladon

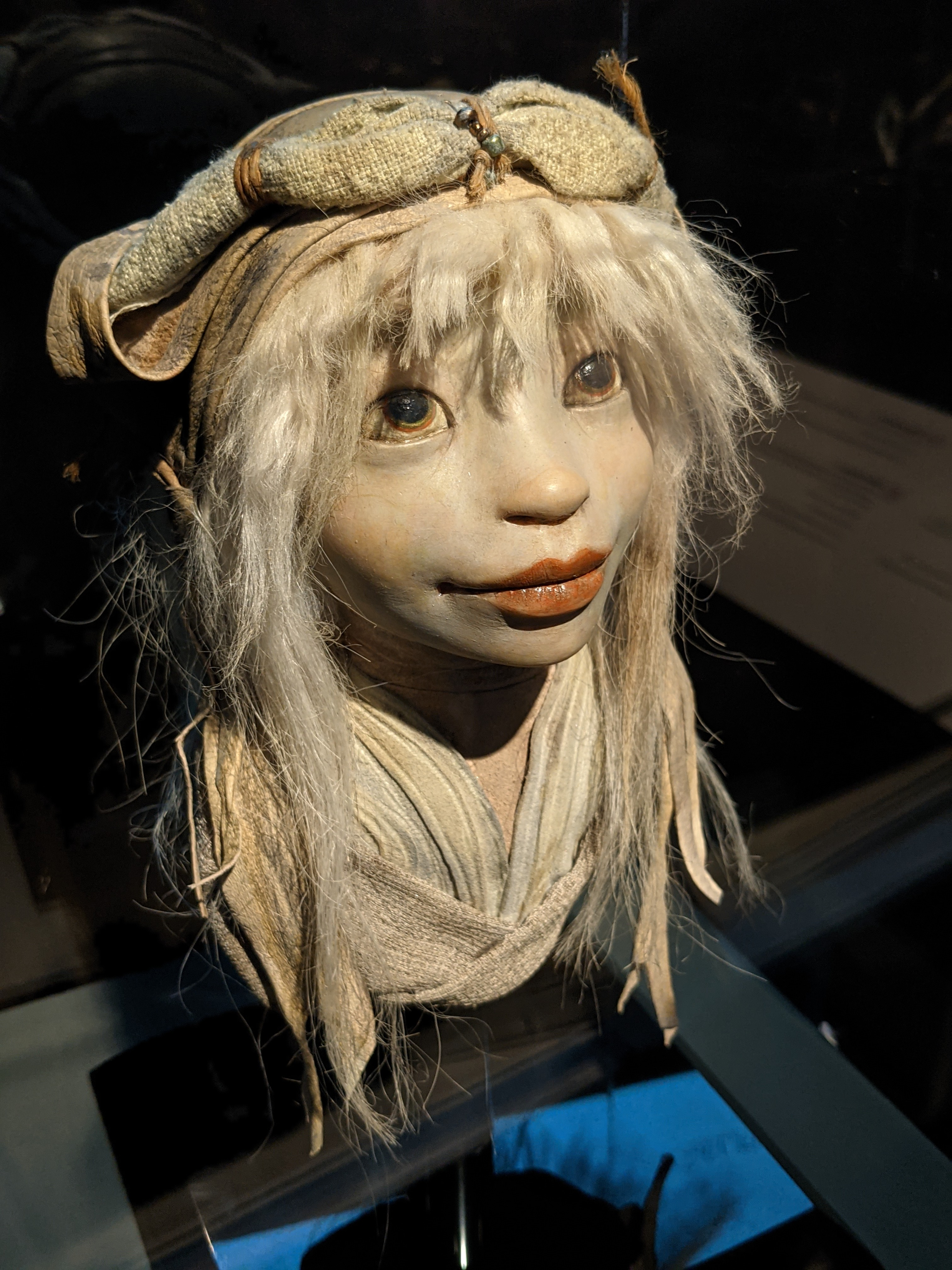
Brea

Puppets (top row) and maquettes (bottom row) of Vapra from The Dark Crystal: Age of Resistance on display at the Museum of the Moving Image.

The Vapra Clan are a Gelfling clan that reside in the city of Ha'rar within the snowy high mountains and appear in The Dark Crystal: Age of Resistance, having ruled the other Gelfling tribes for ages. They are experts on camouflage. Among the known members are:

- Brea (performed by Alice Dinnean, voiced by Anya Taylor-Joy) - Princess of the Vapra Clan, Maudra Mayrin's youngest (third-born) daughter, and one of the main protagonists of The Dark Crystal: Age of Resistance.
- All-Maudra Mayrin (performed by Louise Gold, voiced by Helena Bonham Carter) - Queen of the Vapra Clan and mother of Brea, Seladon, and Tavra. When Mayrin confronts the Skeksis about their lies, she is killed by skekVar.
- Seladon (performed by Helena Smee, voiced by Gugu Mbatha-Raw) - First-born daughter of Maudra Mayrin, she succeeds her mother as All-Maudra of the Gelfling. Seladon denied any Skeksis wrongdoing, until she learned the truth herself.
- Tavra (performed by Neil Sterenberg, voiced by Caitriona Balfe) - Born Katavra, she is a Vapra Paladin who is Maudra Mayrin's second-born daughter. After stabbing skekVar, Tavra is fatally stabbed by skekSil and dies in the presence of her sisters.
- Librarian (performed by Kevin Clash, voiced by Toby Jones) - Overseer of the Vapra Citadel library.
- Mira (performed by Helena Smee, voiced by Alicia Vikander) - Crystal guard who was in a relationship with Rian until she was killed for her essence by Skek-Tek.
- Daudran (performed by Olly Taylor, voiced by Dustin Demri Burns) - Overseer of the Order of Lesser Services.

==== Stonewood Clan ====
The Stonewood clan are a Gelfling clan that reside in the village of Stone-in-the-Wood within the Dark Wood and appear in The Dark Crystal: Age of Resistance. They are strong and proud and most of them are employed as Crystal Guards at the Castle of the Crystal. The Stonewood Clan are also expert cobblers and farmers. Originally they were called the Woodland Clan or Woodland Folk. Among the known members are:

- Rian (performed by Neil Sterenberg, voiced by Taron Egerton) - A member of the Stonewood Clan and one of the main protagonists of The Dark Crystal: Age of Resistance who was part of the Crystal guard until he witnessed his girlfriend Mira's murder by the Skeksis' hands so they could drain her essence in order to cheat death. This leads to him ultimately uniting the Gelfling people against the Skeksis.
- Maudra Fara/The Rock Singer (performed by Alice Dinnean, voiced by Lena Headey) - The leader of the Stonewood Clan at the beginning of Age of Resistance. At first, she was reluctant to hear Rian's claim of what the Skeksis are planning until word of mouth reached Stone-in-the-Wood. After Mayrin was killed by skekVar, Fara and Laesid would not accept Seladon as the All-Maudra as Fara challenged her for the title in a trial by air. In a Skeksis-inspired outfit, Seladon defeated Fara who left with Laesid while the other Maudras bowed to Seladon. She dies during her people's first battle with the Skeksis where she threw herself in front of skekOk's blade to protect Seladon.
- Ordon (performed by Dave Chapman, voiced by Mark Strong) - A member of the Stonewood Clan, captain of the Crystal Guard, and Rian's father. The Skeksis later sent Ordon to retrieve Rian. When he learns the truth, he helps Rian even when skekMal attacks. Ordin sacrifices himself in an attempt to save his son from skekMal by knocking him into the Gobbles.

==== Grottan Clan ====
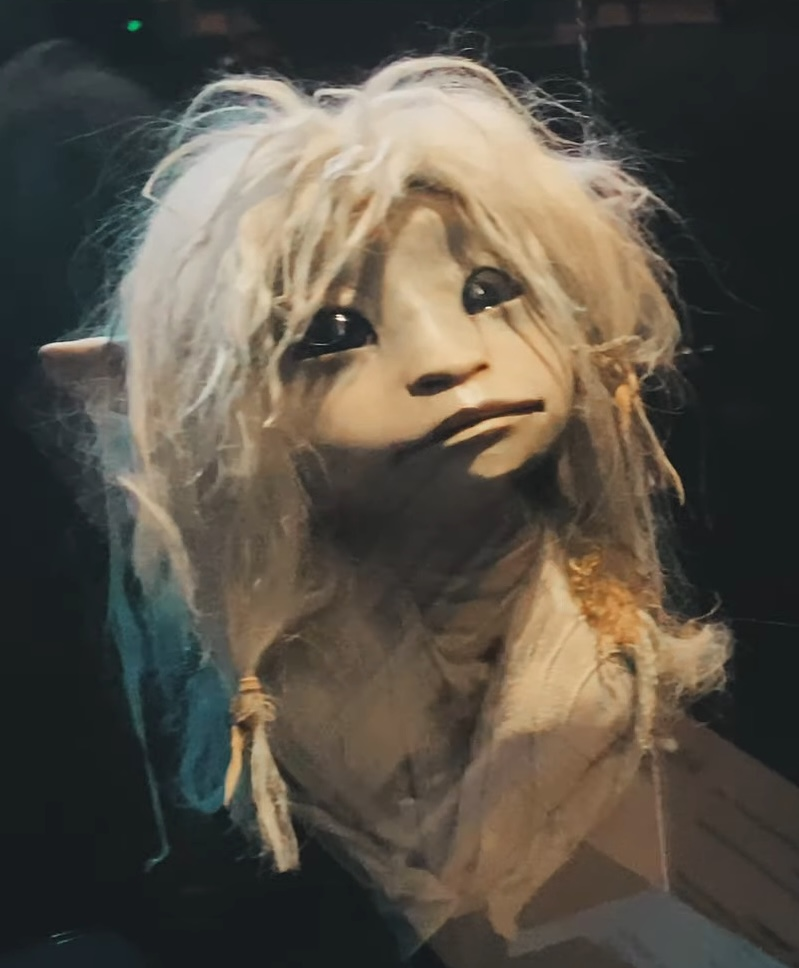
A maquette of Deet, created for The Dark Crystal: Age of Resistance, on display at the Museum of the Moving Image

The Grottan Clan, named after the Caves of Grot, are a secretive Gelfling clan that reside in the Cave of Obscurity, their tribe long thought to be extinct due to their isolation from most of Thra. The Grottan Clan have large ears and big eyes to help them move around in the dark, but are sensitive to sunlight causing them to wear special blindfolds to filter the light. They appear in The Dark Crystal: Age of Resistance. Among the known members are:

- Deet (performed by Beccy Henderson, voiced by Nathalie Emmanuel) - One of the main protagonists of The Dark Crystal: Age of Resistance. Born Deethra, she is the animal carer of the Grottan Clan who learned of the Darkening from Vliste-Staba and helped in the rebellion's formation.
- Maudra Argot the Shadow Bender (performed and voiced by Louise Gold) - The leader of the Grottan Clan. After sending Deet on her quest, Argot was the only Maudra that didn't accept Seladon's invitation to her coronation.
- Mitjan (performed by Victor Yerrid, voiced by Charlie Condou) - The father of Deet, partner of Lath'N, and member of the Grottan Clan.
- Lath'N (performed by Warrick Brownlow-Pike, voiced by James Dreyfus) - The father of Deet, partner of Mitjan, and member of the Grottan Clan.
- Bobb'N (performed by Alice Dinnean, voiced by Beccy Henderson) - The brother of Deet and member of the Grottan Clan.

==== Drenchen Clan ====
The Drenchen Clan are an amphibious Gelfling Clan that live in the Swamps of Sog. They appear in The Dark Crystal: Age of Resistance where their town of Great Smerth is named after the enormous tree that is in the center. The Drenchen Clan have gills that enable them to survive underwater and the females use their wings like fish fins to swim. They are also powerful in combat and take pride in it. The Skeksis could not keep track of the Drenchen Clan's location in their consensus. Among the known members are:

- Maudra Laesid (performed by Warrick Brownlow-Pike, voiced by Nimmy March) - The leader of the Drenchen Clan and the mother of Gurjin and Naia. Following Mayrin's death, she and Fara would not accept Seladon as the All-Maudra.
- Gurjin (performed by Dave Chapman, voiced by Harris Dickinson) - A Crystal guard who is Rian's best friend.
- Naia (performed by Beccy Henderson, voiced by Hannah John-Kamen) - The daughter of Laesid and Gurjin's twin sister who is next in line to become Maudra. She and Kylan were originally hunting Rian until he persuaded them to hear him out and dreamfast with him. Naia later frees Gurjin from his imprisonment.

==== Sifa Clan ====
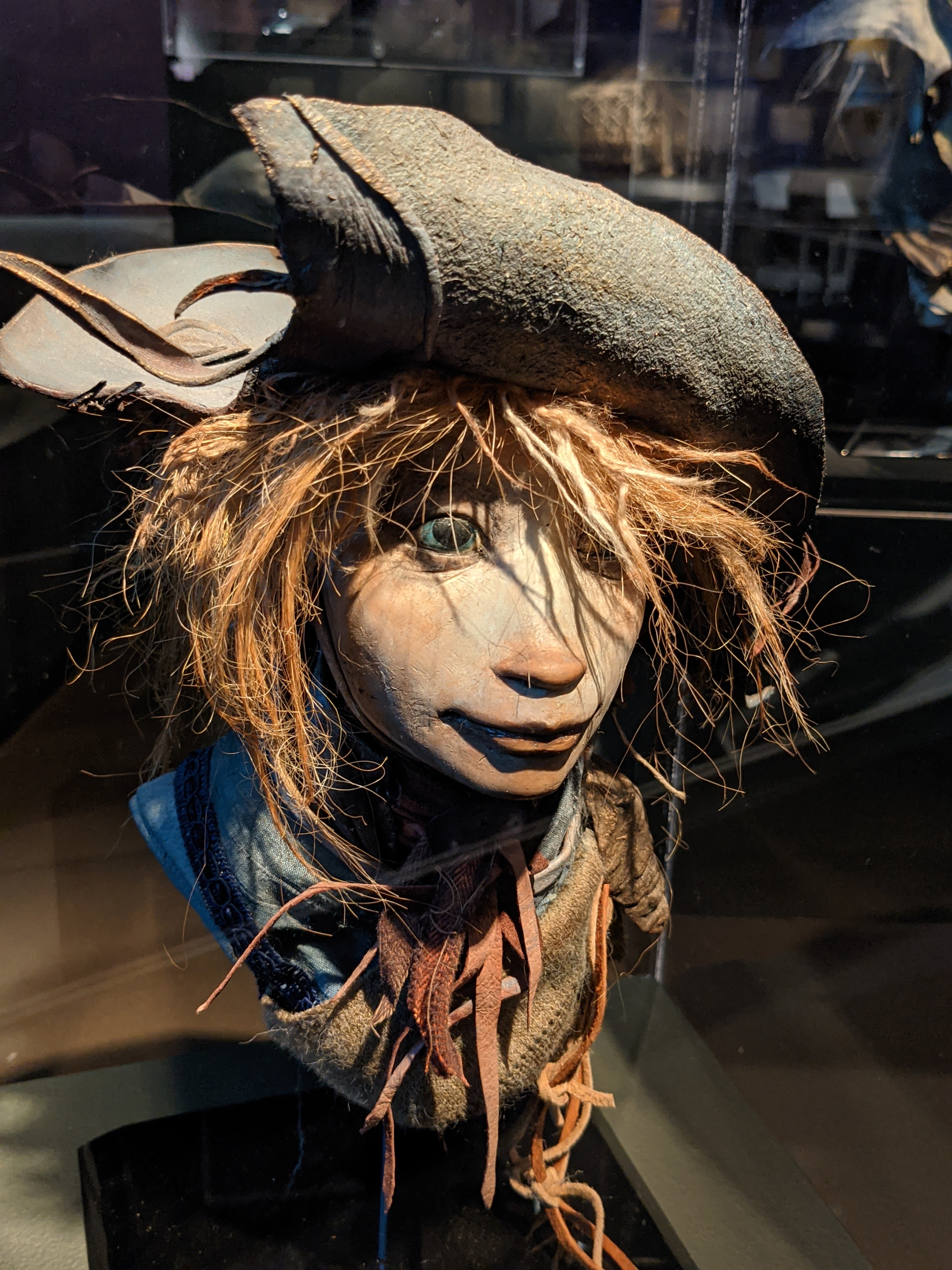
A maquette of a Sifa created for The Dark Crystal: Age of Resistance on display at the Museum of the Moving Image

The Sifa Clan are a sea-faring Gelfling Clan that appear in The Dark Crystal: Age of Resistance. They reside in coastal villages along the Silver Sea where they work as fishermen and sailors. Among the known members are:

- Maudra Ethri (performed by Louise Gold, voiced by Beccy Henderson) - The leader of the Sifa Clan.
- Cadia (performed by Olly Taylor, voiced by Eddie Izzard) - The most well-respected soothsayer of the Sifa Clan. He tried to erase the memory of Brea with tea spiked with Nulroot when she came asking for information about a symbol, only for Brea to switch the cup, causing him to lose his memory. Seladon tried to work to regain Cadia's memory.
- Onica (performed by Louise Gold, voiced by Natalie Dormer) - A member of the Sifa Clan and the daughter of Cadia. After Cadia lost his memory thanks to Brea's trick, Onica gave Brea the information she needed. As Cadia still has no memory during his meeting Seladon, Onica had to be sworn in as the new Elder of the Sifa Clan.
- Red-Haired Paladin (performed by Warrick Brownlow-Pike) - A Gelfling Paladin who was responsible for telling the Crystal Guards the truth about what happened to Mira after Dreamfasting with Rian.

==== Dousan Clan ====
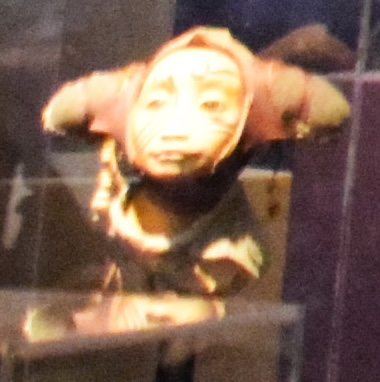
A maquette of a Dousan created for The Dark Crystal: Age of Resistance on display at the Museum of the Moving Image

The Dousan Clan are an elusive Gelfling Clan that reside on the Crystal Sea desert. They appear in The Dark Crystal: Age of Resistance. The Dousan Clan navigate the sands of the Crystal Sea by riding Crystal Skimmers, gather at an oasis in the Crystal Sea called the Wellspring, and hold ancient rituals that involve music. Dousan shamans are known to eat hallucinogenic berries in order to glimpse into the future and talk to Thra. Among the known members are:

- Maudra Seethi the Skin Painter (performed by Beccy Henderson, voiced by Kemi-Bo Jacobs) - The leader of the Dousan Clan.
- Rek'yr (performed by Olly Taylor, voiced by Theo James) - A member of the Dousan Clan.

==== Spriton Clan ====
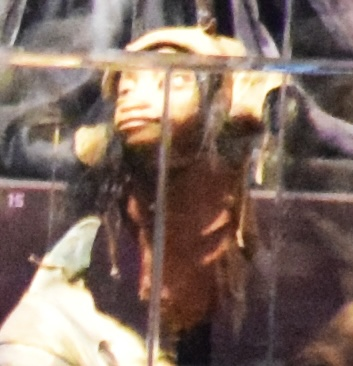
A maquette of a Spriton created for The Dark Crystal: Age of Resistance on display at the Museum of the Moving Image

The Spriton Clan are a war-like Gelfling clan that appear in The Dark Crystal: Age of Resistance. They are a farming community that live on the southern plains of Thra and are a rival of the Stonewood Clan. The Spriton Clan reside in Sami Thicket, but mostly are in other parts of Thra trading items with its other inhabitants. Agriculture and creature husbandry are also part of their lives. Among the known members are:

- Maudra Mera (performed by Neil Sterenberg, voiced by Nina Sosanya) - The leader of the Spriton Clan.
- Kylan (performed by Victor Yerrid, voiced by Shazad Latif) - The song teller of the Spriton Clan. He and Naia were originally hunting Rian until he persuaded them to hear him out and dreamfast with him.
- Jul - A member of the Spriton Clan.
- Tolyn (voiced by Jack Myers) - Second-in-command of the Crystal Guard and a member of the Spriton Clan. He is Rian's arch-rival and the only guard who hates him. Tolyn was the one who told the Skeksis of the Crystal Guard's uprising, though they drained his essence anyway.

=== Fizzgig ===
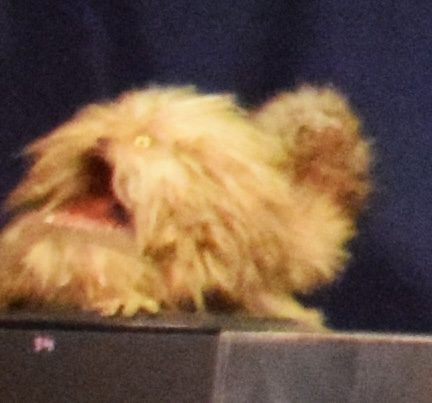
A Fizzgig puppet used in The Dark Crystal: Age of Resistance on display at the Museum of the Moving Image

Fizzgigs are small, furry creatures raised by the Podlings to herd nebrie. They have four stubby legs but roll to move quicker. They have a pair of eyes and both a regular jaw and an inner jaw. The Podlings domesticated the Fizzgig to keep watch on plant trendrils and herd nebrie.

The Gelfling Kira owned a Fizzgig. The Dark Crystal: Age of Resistance featured a named Fizzgig.

- Baffi (performed by Dave Goelz) - An eyepatch-wearing Fizzgig that is owned by Maudra Fara.

==== Kira's Fizzgig ====
The Dark Crystal character

Fizzgig
- Species: Fizzgig
- Gender: Male
- Home: With Kira
- Affiliations: Kira and later Jen
- Performed by: Dave Goelz (performer); Rollie Krewson (assistant)
- Voiced by: Percy Edwards

Described as "a friendly monster" in the initial draft of the screenplay, the character of Fizzgig is the pet of Kira: resembling a dog in voice and manners, but unlike a dog in that his facial features are tiny and his entire body is represented by a brown/red/gray ball of fur. Kira's Fizzgig moves by rolling, though he does appear to have at least two legs. His mouth, when open, appears to encompass most of his size and possesses two sets of sharp teeth. He is fiercely loyal to Kira, has an aggressive temper, and is wary of unfamiliar things. Fizzgig is at first wary of Jen, but becomes his friend.

Kira's Fizzgig later made a cameo in the Fraggle Rock episode "Gobo's Discovery", as one of the background cave creatures.

Kira's Fizzgig was designed by Brian Froud and his design and fabrication supervisor was Rollie Krewson.

Kira's Fizzgig is the only major character represented in the film by a puppet with immobile eyes.

=== Aughra ===
The Dark Crystal character

Aughra
- Species: Unknown (said to be born of the essence of the planet Thra)
- Gender: Intersexed (female pronouns used)
- Home: High Hill Observatory
- Affiliations: Thra
- Performed by: Frank Oz; David Greenaway (assistant); Kiran Shah (body); Kevin Clash (in The Dark Crystal: Age of Resistance)
- Voiced by: Billie Whitelaw (film); Donna Kimball (in The Dark Crystal: Age of Resistance)

Aughra, Keeper of Secrets and revered by the Gelflings as Mother Aughra, is an oracle who is actually an emanation of the planet Thra created long ago with the task of observing for the planet until she is reabsorbed back into it, having the ability to command plants and remove her eyes for an extended view of her surroundings. Aughra served in guiding the early Gelflings before the first Great Conjunction. While intersexed, Aughra is mostly female as her masculine side was burned along with her right eye as the result of directly witnessing the Great Conjunction up close. But she was saved from death by the urSkeks with their member TekTih teaching her of the inner workings of the universe while creating her observatory home on top of a mountain known as High Hill, Aughra providing information on Thra in return. Present at the second Great Conjunction that splintered the urSkeks, Aughra attempted to calm down the nascent Skeksis before they cracked the Crystal of Truth and tricked her into entering a deep slumber to see the universe before she reawakens during the events of Age of Resistance. Upon learning what the Skeksis have done, Aughra regrets leaving Thra to them as she allies herself with the Gelflings during their rebellion. In the aftermath of the Garthim War, Aughra keeps the Shard safe in her observatory until Jen arrived to obtain it, but the Garthim destroy Aughra's home while attempting to capture Jen, bringing her to the Castle where she rebukes the Skeksis before being locked away in skekTek's Chamber of Life until she is freed and witnesses the urSkeks' restoration. Aughra makes a return appearance in the comic book sequel to The Dark Crystal, titled The Power of the Dark Crystal.

In the film, Aughra is portrayed primarily by Frank Oz in costume. Oz also voiced Aughra originally (similar to a combination of Fozzie Bear, Yoda, and Miss Piggy); but her lines were redubbed by Billie Whitelaw.

Aughra appears in The Dark Crystal: Age of Resistance. She awakens from her journey to find that the Skeksis have corrupted Thra. She gave up her life essence to help the Skeksis heal skekMal. When urVa jumps to his death, skekMal dies and Aughra is reconstituted.

Her designer was Brian Froud and her design and fabrication supervisor was Lyle Conway. The fabrication team for Aughra included: David Barclay, Jeremy Hunt, Paul Jiggins, Graeme Galvin, and Steve Court.

=== Skeksis ===
The Skeksis are the central antagonists of The Dark Crystal franchise: the ten dark versions of the ten "good" urRu/Mystics (see below). The word "Skeksis" serves as both singular and plural form for this species, with the singular pronounced /ˈskɛksɪs/ and the plural /ˈskɛksiːz/. They are described by concept artist Brian Froud as "part reptile, part vulture, part dragon". Like their urRu counterparts, they have four arms; but in the Skeksis the two lower arms have become weak and atrophied, and are rarely seen. The Skeksis have kept themselves from dying of old age by draining the vitality from other beings. In the film, the Skeksis are represented by full-bodied puppets engineered under the direction of Jim Henson. Henson has said that in the development of the Skeksis, the creators drew inspiration from the Seven deadly sins, in that each Skeksis represents a different kind of evil, such as cruelty, selfishness, greed, unchecked ambition, treachery, and wrath. The Skeksis were full-bodied puppets operated in a very similar way to Big Bird. The puppeteer's secondary arm was in the arm of the Skeksis and the puppeteer's primary arm was held up over the puppeteer's head and the hand operates the jaw. A monitor inside the suit allowed the puppeteer to see.

- skekSo the Emperor (performed by Jim Henson in the film, Dave Chapman in The Dark Crystal: Age of Resistance, voiced by Jerry Nelson in the film, Jason Isaacs in The Dark Crystal: Age of Resistance) - The arrogant, greedy, maniacal, and cold leader of the Skeksis. He dies and rots as a result of too much exposure to the Darkening.
- skekZok the Ritual-Master (performed by Jim Henson in the film, Victor Yerrid in The Dark Crystal: Age of Resistance, voiced by Jerry Nelson in the film, Keegan-Michael Key in The Dark Crystal: Age of Resistance) - The pompous and gruff high priest of the Ceremony of the Sun and second to the Emperor in power, governing the others through prophecies and rites invented by himself.
- skekUng the Garthim-Master (performed by Dave Goelz in the film, assisted by Rollie Krewson in the film, voiced by Michael Kilgarriff in the film) - The strong, aggressive and power-hungry general who succeeds skekSo as Emperor and commands the Garthim. He represents the Deadly Sin of Wrath.
- skekSil the Chamberlain (performed by Frank Oz in the film, Warrick Brownlow-Pike in The Dark Crystal: Age of Resistance, stunt performed by Kiran Shah in the film, voiced by Barry Dennen in the film, Simon Pegg in The Dark Crystal: Age of Resistance) - A Skeksis who was to be the next in line to the throne. Exiled after skekUng successfully challenged his claim to the throne. skekSil was later reinstated after he captures Kira. He is sly and speaks in a wheedling voice that the other Skeksis find annoying, especially skekUng who calls him a "whimpering worm." He represents the Deadly Sin of Envy.
- skekTek the Scientist (performed by Steve Whitmire in the film, Olly Taylor in The Dark Crystal: Age of Resistance, voiced by Steve Whitmire in the film, Mark Hamill in The Dark Crystal: Age of Resistance) - A scientist performing unspecified deadly experiments on animals, and deriving essence from Gelflings and Podlings to rejuvenate his compatriots. He sports a telescopic eye as a result of having his eye being eaten by a Peeper Beetle after being framed by skekSil for letting Rian escape with Mira's essence, a prosthetic arm and leg, a transparent tube replacing one of his jugular veins so he can study his own blood circulation, and can occasionally be seen leaning on a cane. He fell into the fiery pit to his demise by his prisoners at the behest of Kira and Aughra organizing an animal rebellion. Despite performing experiments on animals, he had one small bird-like creature he genuinely loved.

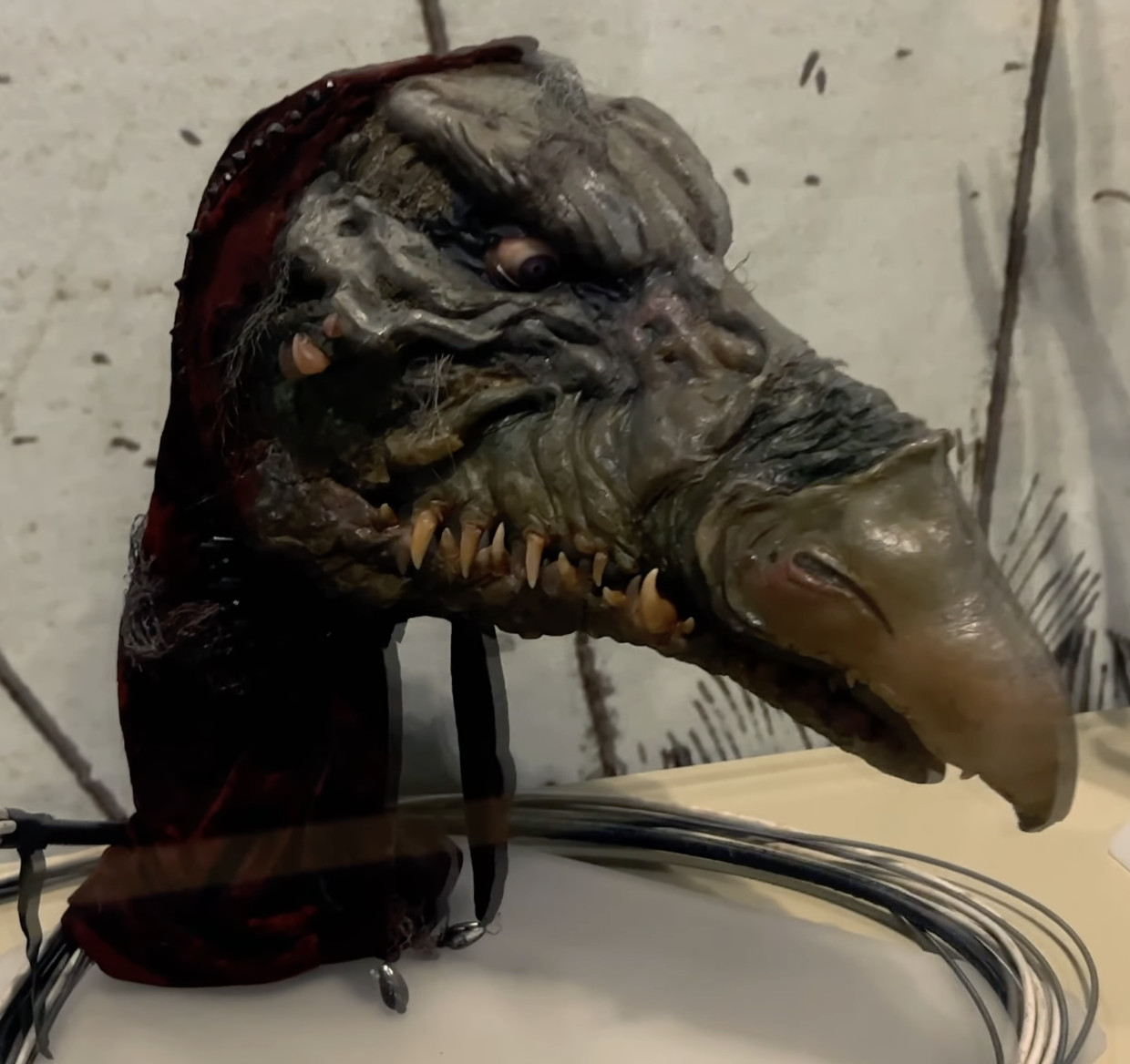
The head of the skekShod puppet used in The Dark Crystal on display at the Center for Puppetry Arts, Atlanta

- skekAyuk the Gourmand (performed by Louise Gold in the film and The Dark Crystal: Age of Resistance, voiced by Thick Wilson in the film, Harvey Fierstein in The Dark Crystal: Age of Resistance) - Commander of slaves where he has them create complex meals for the Skeksis while also organizing the Skeksis banquets. He represents the Deadly Sin of Gluttony.
- skekNa the Slave-Master (performed by Mike Quinn in the film, voiced by David Buck in the film) - The abusive and cold hearted Slave-Master who oversees the enslaved Podlings at the Castle. He has a hook for a left hand and an eyepatch over his right eye. Later books retconned skekNa's history with him having been a Spy-Master before becoming the Slave-Master.
- skekOk the Scroll-Keeper (performed by Bob Payne in the film, Neil Sterenberg in The Dark Crystal: Age of Resistance, voiced by John Baddeley in the film, Neil Sterenberg in The Dark Crystal: Age of Resistance) - The smallest and weakest of the Skeksis, who preserves inaccurate records of their history while working as their historian.
- skekShod the Treasurer (performed by Tim Rose in the film, voiced by Charles Collingwood in the film) - The court treasurer whose vocabulary is so limited, the only way he got his ways was extravagant bribery. He represents the Deadly Sin of Greed.
- skekEkt the Ornamentalist (performed by Brian Muehl in the film, Alice Dinnean in The Dark Crystal: Age of Resistance) - One of the vainest Skeksis who designs and makes their garments. He is also in charge of selecting Podlings for the choir. skekEkt represents the Deadly Sin of Vanity.

The series prequel The Dark Crystal: Age of Resistance introduced new Skeksis characters who appeared in other media.

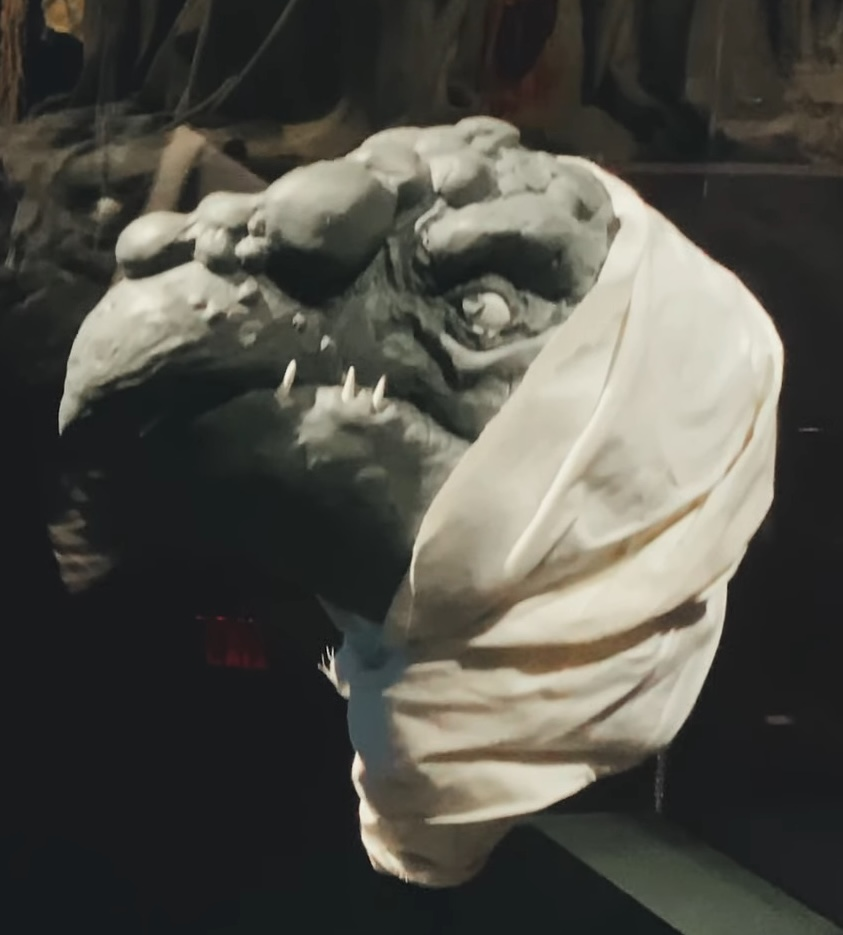
A maquette of skekLach, created for The Dark Crystal: Age of Resistance, on display at the Museum of the Moving Image

- skekLach the Collector (performed by Helena Smee, voiced by Awkwafina) - A sickly-looking Skeksis who serves as census taker before being killed prior to the Garthim War, having been portrayed in the Legends of the Dark Crystal manga as a schemer taking Gelfling essence behind skekSo's back and extorting skekTek to keep his silence. In The Dark Crystal: Age of Resistance, he accompanied skekOk to Ha'rar to claim tribute from the Vapra Clan. His death is further detailed where Deet redirects the Darkening unleashed by skekSo which caused skekLach to explode.

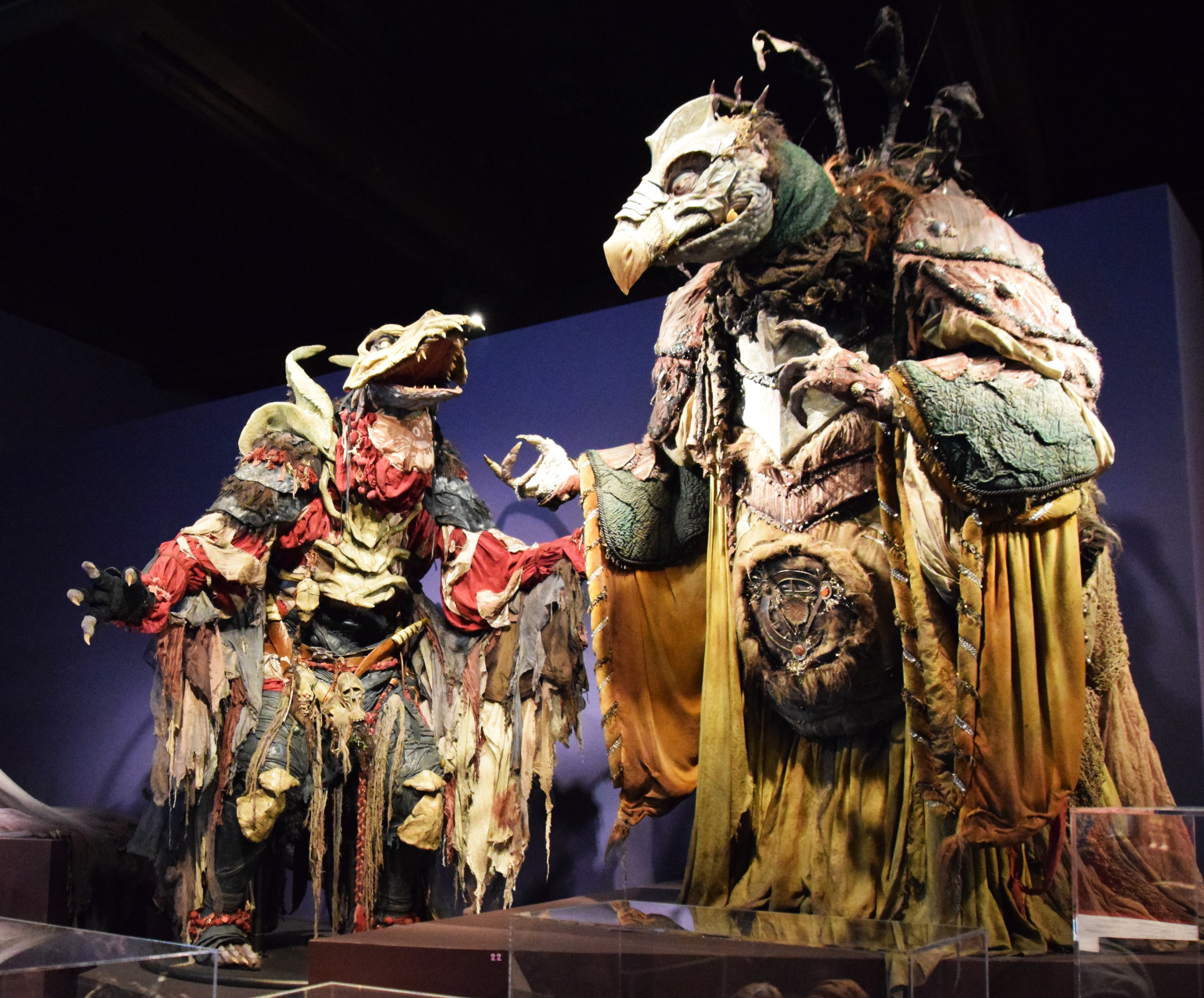
The skekMal and skekVar puppets used in The Dark Crystal: Age of Resistance on display at the Museum of the Moving Image

- skekVar the General (performed by Kevin Clash and Katherine Smee, voiced by Benedict Wong) - A Skeksis who serves as skekUng's predecessor in military matters before he was slain by skekSil, having first appeared in the Legends of the Dark Crystal manga. In The Dark Crystal: Age of Resistance, skekVar and skekSil competed for skekSo's favor. skekVar's death is further detailed where skekSil sets up skekVar to fall in battle against Rian which disappointed skekSo. When skekSil checks up on a wounded skekVar, he kills him. Following a retreat from Stone-in-the-Wood, skekSil states to skekSo that he died from his injuries when skekSo asks where he is.
- skekMal the Hunter (performed by Kevin Clash, in-suit performed by Nick Kellington, voiced by Ralph Ineson) - A wild and bloodthirsty Skeksis with retractable arms who debuted in the Dark Crystal Author Quest novel. In The Dark Crystal: Age of Resistance, skekMal is summoned by skekSil to hunt down Rian. He survives Ordon's sacrificial attempt to stop him with ravenous Gobbles. During the Gelflings' search for the Dual Glave, skekMal ambushes them and is mortally wounded by urVa. Aughra offers her lifeforce in order to save skekMal's life. During the next fight with the Gelflings in the Stone-in-the-Wood, skekMal awakens, makes his way to Stone-in-the-Wood, and fights Rian where he breaks the Dual Glaive that Rian was wielding. He is killed when urVa jumps off the Circle of Suns causing Aughra to be reconstituted.
- skekGra the Heretic (performed by Damian Farrell, voiced by Andy Samberg) - Formerly skekGra the Conqueror, he was the Skeksis who defeated the other races for the Skeksis and first appeared in the Dark Crystal Author Quest novel. After having a vision of Thra and realizing the error of the Skeksis' ways, skekGra was banished and came to live with his urRu counterpart urGoh the Wanderer. The pair of them took it upon themselves to find and safeguard the Shard until it could be properly used. In The Dark Crystal: Age of Resistance, skekGra and urGoh gave the Shard to the Gelflings.

In Archaia Comics the Dark Crystal: Creation Myths 2, two Skeksis are seen:

- skekHak the Machinist and skekYi the Deceased - They were two Skeksis seen at the end of Volume 2 of The Dark Crystal Creation Myths who died immediately after the botch division of the urSkeks. When one of the Skeksis goes rogue in the Crystal Chamber, it proceeds to kill two urRu: one is choked to death, while the other is thrown into the fire Shaft under the Crystal, leading to the deaths of their Skeksis counterparts. skekHak came from the urSkek Architect HakHom, while skekYi came from the urSkek YiYa, whose position is unknown.

In the Dark Crystal Author Quest novels, two more Skeksis appeared. Both were referenced in the ninth episode of Age of Resistance:

- skekSa the Mariner - Also known as the Captain; appears as a major character in the J.M. Lee novel Tides of the Dark Crystal, and is described as female, despite the fact the urSkeks (and therefore the Mystics and the Skeksis) are gender-less creatures. "She" was mentioned by skekZok as being good in a fight.
- skekLi the Satirist - The Skeksis who wrote satire stories for the enjoyment of the Skeksis and was the main antagonist of the J.M. Lee novel Song of the Dark Crystal. skekOk inquired as to his whereabouts in Age of Resistance.

In Tokyopop's OEL manga Legends of the Dark Crystal vol. 1 and 2, two more Skeksis are introduced. Since later novels and the TV series, these characters are no longer canon:

- skekEer the Spy-Master - He is an ally of skekVar, along with the Mariner. Due to being removed from canon, his position is revealed to have been skekNa's before the Skeksis needed slaves.
- skekCru the Mariner - He is an ally of skerVar and skekEer the Spy-Master. Due to the novels, the Mariner has been retconned as female and renamed SkekSa.

=== urRu/Mystics ===
More commonly known as the "Mystics", the urRu are benign counterparts of the Skeksis and embody the urSkeks' redeeming qualities yet are mostly indifferent and rarely act. After two of their own are killed by a rogue Skeksis, they learn that they are still linked with their counterparts, and most of the urRu take refuge in the Valley of the Standing Stones, leaving the Skeksis to their devices. While initially lean and fairly agile creatures, nearly identical to the Skeksis, the urRu aged differently from their counterparts as they began using walking sticks to move around while gradually losing their memories. During the course of the film, after urSu allowed himself to die to place the remaining nine Skeksis into disarray, urZah leads the urRu towards the Castle to fulfill the prophecy and merge with their Skeksis counterparts back into the urSkeks. The urRu have four arms, elongated heads, white hair, and tails, in a manner that concept artist Brian Froud described as being "... between a dog and a dinosaur".

- urSu the Master (performed by Brian Muehl) - The leader of the urRu, Jen's mentor, and fatherly figure. He allows himself to die of old age by vanishing, after charging Jen with the task of healing the Dark Crystal. By dying, he causes the death of the Skeksis Emperor, weakening the Skeksis by the ensuing struggle for the throne.
- urZah the Ritual-Guardian (performed by Brian Muehl, voiced by Sean Barrett) - He is the Mystics' ritualist and would make the sand paintings of prophecy for the Mystics by pouring out the colored sands while the others chanted. He would comb and brush the sands of amethyst, opal, agate, onyx, and chalcedony to build the forms of spiral energy. He speaks more freely than the other urRu, but in riddles. Deep meditation leaves spirals in all his body, not just in his face.
- urIm the Healer (performed by David Greenaway) - He is the Mystic Healer. He becomes the new Master after urSu dies.
- urSol the Chanter (performed by Simon Williamson) - He is described as capable of two voices: one deep and the other light, whereof each can alter reality. He is the counterpart of skekSil the Chamberlain, considered by Aughra as a rogue and impatient by urRu standards. Compared to the other Mystics, urSol takes a more active role in the comic book sequel The Power of the Dark Crystal as he secretly gifted Aughra with a means of summoning a creature from the urSkeks' homeworld to aid the Gefling against the Skeksis. He subsequently died when skekSil was destroyed by the Crystal reforming itself as the Prism, with both their spirits residing within it.
- urTih the Alchemist (performed by Toby Philpott) - He was described as a manipulator of states of matter. urTih spontaneously combusts when his Skeksis counterpart skekTek falls to his death in a fiery pit.
- urAmaj the Cook (performed by Hugh Spight) - The cook of the urRu.
- urNol the Herbalist (performed by Swee Lim) - urAmaj's companion and a master of using herbs.

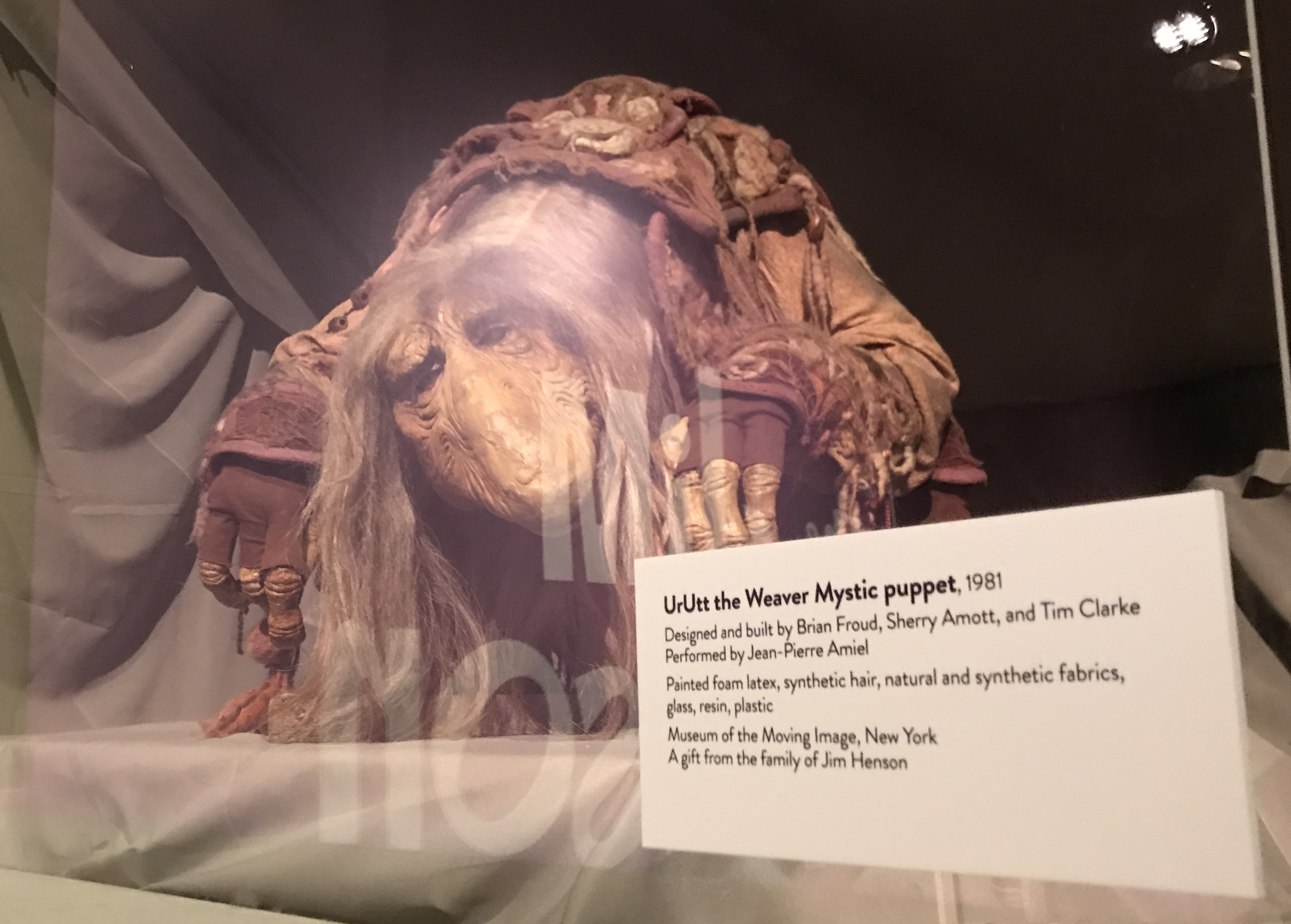
The UrUtt puppet used in The Dark Crystal on display at the Museum of Pop Culture

- urAc the Scribe (performed by Hus Levant) - He is a chronicler of the "simpler thoughts" of his compatriots.
- urYod the Numerologist (performed by Robbie Barnett) - He is the timekeeper and mathematician among the urRu. He was shown teaching Jen.
- urUtt the Weaver (performed by John Pierre Amiel) - The maker of the urRu's robes.
- urVa the Archer (performed by Olly Taylor, voiced by Ólafur Darri Ólafsson) - A skilled master of martial arts including archery, and the counterpart of skekMal the Hunter who appears in The Dark Crystal: Age of Resistance. He helps Aughra regain her connection to Thra. urVa later sacrificed himself to stop skekMal from murdering more Gelflings by jumping from the Circle of Suns where he faded away before hitting the ground.
- urGoh the Wanderer (performed by Olly Taylor, voiced by Bill Hader) - A slow-talking Mystic who once traveled around the world and is skekGra the Heretic's counterpart. He is depicted in Volume 3 of Creation Myths to save Podling leader Kotha after her village was attacked by creatures that came from the deep caverns of Thra and guide Raunip and a girl Gelfling, Thall, to the Valley of the Mystics. He provides help to find a new home for the underground beasts in the land of fire. Appearing in The Dark Crystal: Age of Resistance, urGoh lives with skekGra in self-imposed exile in the Crystal Desert as the two desire to merge back into GraGoh and gave the Gelflings the Shard.
- urMa the Peacemaker - A Mystic who was skilled in Diplomacy and skekVar's counterpart. Killed as a result of skekVar's murder by skekSil.
- urSen the Monk - A Mystic and skekLach's counterpart who died when skekLach was destroyed by the Darkening that Deet redirected at him. First appeared in Tokyopop's OEL manga Legends of the Dark Crystal as its narrator.

In Archaia Comics The Dark Crystal: Creation Myth Volumes 2 and 3, four new Mystics were introduced:

- urHom the Carpenter and urYa - They were two urRu that appeared at the end of volume 2 of Dark Crystal Creation Myths, and were killed by a rogue Skeksis after the botched division. One was choked while the other thrown into the fire Shaft under the Crystal, killing their Skeksis counterparts in the process. urHom came from the urSkek Architect HakHom, while urYa came from the urSkek YiYa, whose position is unknown. Their deaths helped establish to Aughra the connection that existed between the Skeksis and Mystics.

In the Dark Crystal Author Quest series by J.M. Lee, three new canonical urRu are introduced and one appearing in the Netflix series The Dark Crystal Age of Resistance.

- urSan the Swimmer - A skilled Swimmer and counterpart to skekSa the Mariner.
- urLii the Storyteller - An urRu skill in storytelling, and was the counterpart of skekLi the Satirist.

=== urSkeks ===
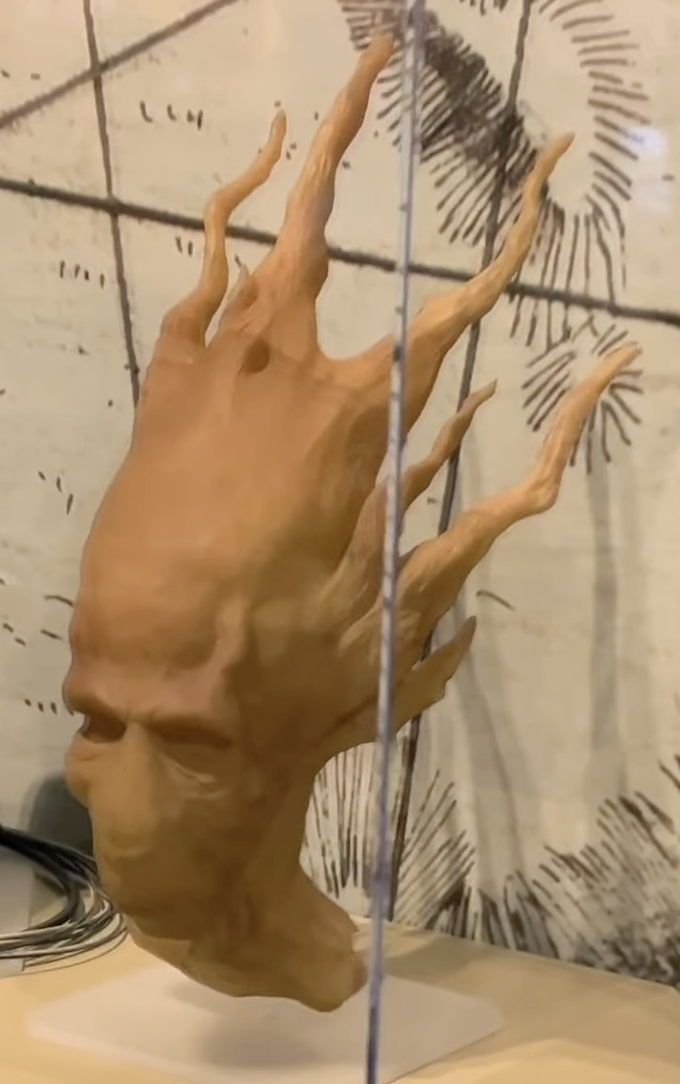
The transitional head of an urSkek puppet used in The Dark Crystal on display at the Center for Puppetry Arts

The urSkeks are the beings from which the urRu and the Skeksis are derived, depicted as tall, luminescent beings of vaguely Gelfling-like shape. They sported large craniums and slim bodies. As revealed in The World of the Dark Crystal, their people considering both their moral imperfections and attempt of manipulating their homeworld's Crystal intolerable, the eighteen urSkeks were banished to Thra through the Crystal of Truth until they have learned to master their dark aspects. Once on Thra, presenting themselves as "light bringers", the urSkeks spend the next thousand years hastening the development of the planet's people while exploiting Aughra's interest in the universe to acquire the Crystal of Truth from her. By the time of the second Great Conjunction, the urSkeks created a mirror network around the Great Crystal to trap the light of the next Great Conjunction for their use in returning to their world while purging their imperfections. But the attempt failed and resulted in the Crystal of Truth becoming the Dark Crystal and splintered the urSkeks into the urRu and the Skeksis, each member being spiritually linked to his counterpart. If any member of either species is wounded or killed, their counterpart suffers the same fate. By the events of the film, the others having died of various causes, only eight of the urSkeks are reformed before they depart Thra soon after. In between TokyoPop's Legends of the Dark Crystal, Archaia Comics The Dark Crystal: Creation Myths and Dark Crystal Author Quest, various Skeksis and Mystics were introduced which provides the identities of some of the deceased urSkeks (Skeksis/urRu), but thanks to The Dark Crystal: Age of Resistance, alongside the J.M. Lee novels, these are the canon 18 UrSkeks:

- UngIm (voiced by Joseph O'Conor) - The original form of the Garthim-Master skekUng and the Healer urIm, the leader of the urSkeks and their representative.
- SoSu - The original form of the Emperor skekSo and the Master urSu, he is the leader of the urSkeks. He is among the urSkeks not to be restored as the result of his divided selves dying of old age.
- TekTih - The original form of the Scientist skekTek and the Alchemist urTih, Aughra's mentor who helped built her observatory and taught her to understand the stars while she provided him with knowledge of Thra's minerals and metals. He is among the urSkeks not to be restored as the result of skekTek falling to his death to the fiery pits deep beneath the Dark Crystal which also resulted in urTih bursting into flames while reaching the Crystal Castle.
- SilSol - The original form of the Chamberlain skekSil and the Chanter urSol.
- ZokZah - The original form of the Ritual-Master skekZok and the Ritual-Guardian urZah.
- AyukAmaj - The original form of the Gourmand skekAyuk and the Cook urAmaj.
- NaNol - The original form of the Slave-Master skekNa and the Herbalist urNol.
- OkAc - The original form of the Scroll-Keeper skekOk and the Scribe urAc.
- ShodYod - The original form of the Treasurer skekShod and the Numerologist urYod.
- EktUtt - The original form of the Ornamentalist skekEkt and the Weaver urUtt.
- VarMa - The original form of the General skekVar and the Peacemaker urMa. He is among the urSkeks not to be restored as the result of skekVar being murdered by skekSil years before the events of the film.
- LachSen - The original form of the Collector skekLach and the Monk urSen. He is among the urSkeks not to be restored as the result of skekLach being obliterated by Deet years before the events of the film.
- MalVa - The original form of the Hunter skekMal and the Archer urVa. He is among the urSkeks not to be restored as the result of urVa committing suicide to end skekMal's rampage years before the events of the film.
- GraGoh - The original form of the Conqueror skekGra and the Wanderer urGoh, the two seeking to be rejoined into their true self.
- LiLii - The original form of the Satirist skekLi and the Storyteller urLii.
- SaSan - The original form of the Mariner skekSa and the Swimmer urSan.
- YiYa - The original form of skekYi and urYa. His position is unknown and right after the division, his split personas were the first to be killed by a rogue Skeksis who strangled urYa.
- HakHom - The original form of skekHak and urHom. His position was an Architect and right after the division, his split personas were the second pair to die by a rogue Skeksis who threw urHom down the Shaft.

=== Podlings/Pod People ===
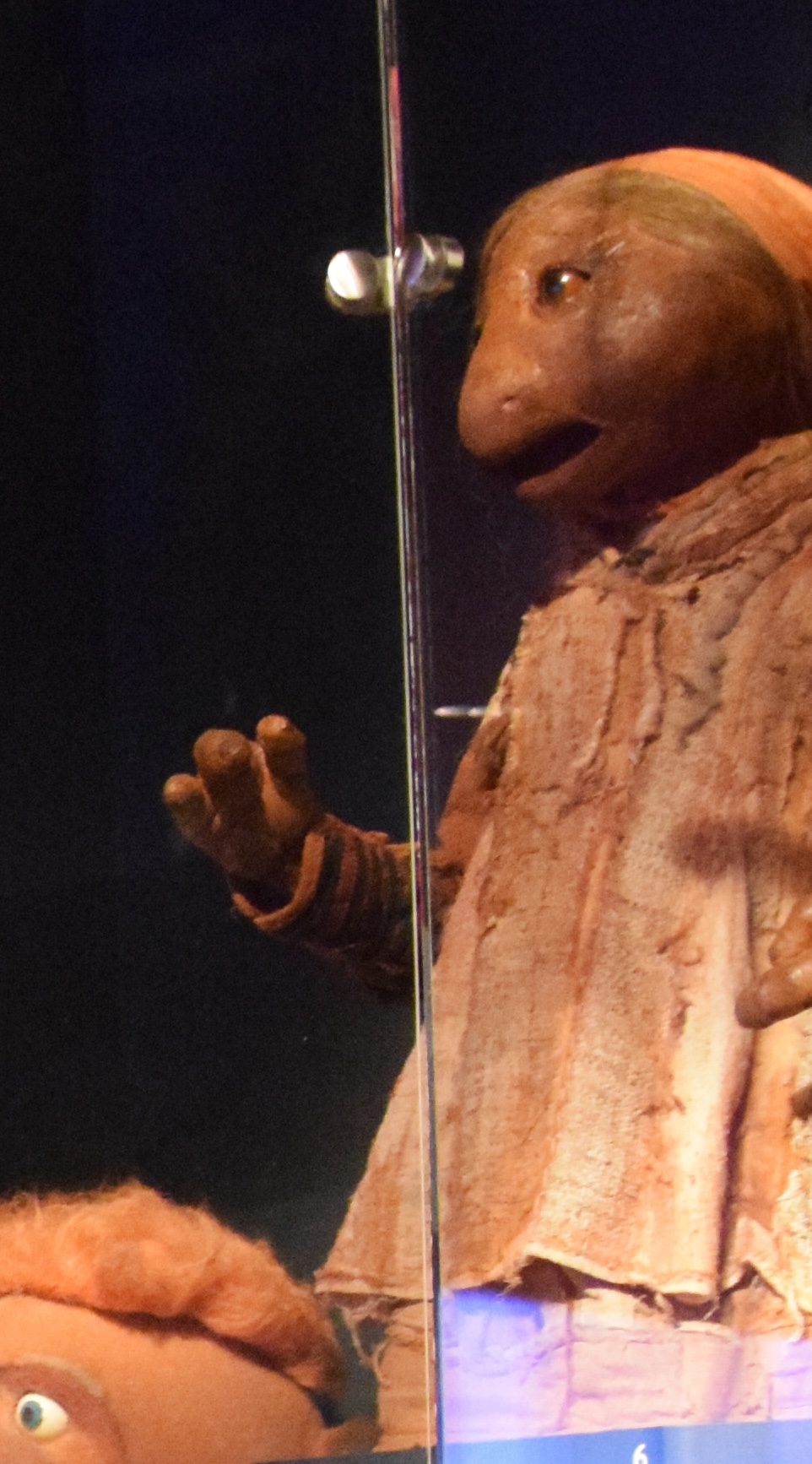
Female Podling puppet used in The Dark Crystal on display at the Museum of the Moving Image

The Podlings, also known as the Pod People, are a species of gentle "earth-people" native to Thra and affiliated with the Gelflings, named for the giant seed-pods in which they live. In their own language, they referred to themselves as apopiapoiopidiappididiapipob, which translated as "master gardeners who live in bulging plants." The Podlings are dwarf-like in stature yet with very rounded, circular-shaped, bulbous potato-like heads and small round eyes. They have a love of music and parties. In tune with nature, they can speak to Thra's wildlife and Kira was taught this skill by her adoptive mother Ydra. With The World of the Dark Crystal revealing that many were initially lured to the Castle, the Podlings were abducted from their homes by the Garthim so that skekTek can extract their vital essence for a youth serum reserved for the Emperor. While the serum's effects are temporary compared to the essence extracted from Gelflings, the process turns the Podlings into aged and mindless slaves who submit to the Skeksis' commands. At the end of the film, the enslaved Podlings are restored to their original selves.

The unnamed Podlings in the film are performed by Dave Goelz, Jim Henson, and Frank Oz and voiced by Barry Dennen, Patrick Monckton, and Sue Weatherby.

The creature and costume designs for the Podlings were done by Brian Froud and the design and fabrication supervisor was Sherry Amont. The design and fabrication team for the Podlings consisted of Bob Payne, Amy Van Gilder, Mike Quinn, Cheryl Henson, Marianne Harms, Nick Forder, Sarah Monzani, Peter Saunders, and Debbie Coda. Polly Smith, Barbara Davis, and Ellis Duncan were associate costume designers.

There have been some named Podlings:

- Hup (performed by Victor Yerrid) - A Podling in The Dark Crystal: Age of Resistance who carries a large wooden spoon like a sword and aspires to be a Paladin, becoming Deet's friend and joining her quest. The comic book side story reveals Hup was previously a cook in at a Spriton inn before he was driven from Sami Thicket for striking the visiting skekShod for repeatedly complaining about the swamp water soup's quality.
- Ydra - A Podling who raised Kira.

The Dark Crystal: Age of Resistance also features some unnamed Podling servants (performed by Warrick Brownlow-Pike and Louise Gold) that work for the Skeksis.

=== Garthim ===
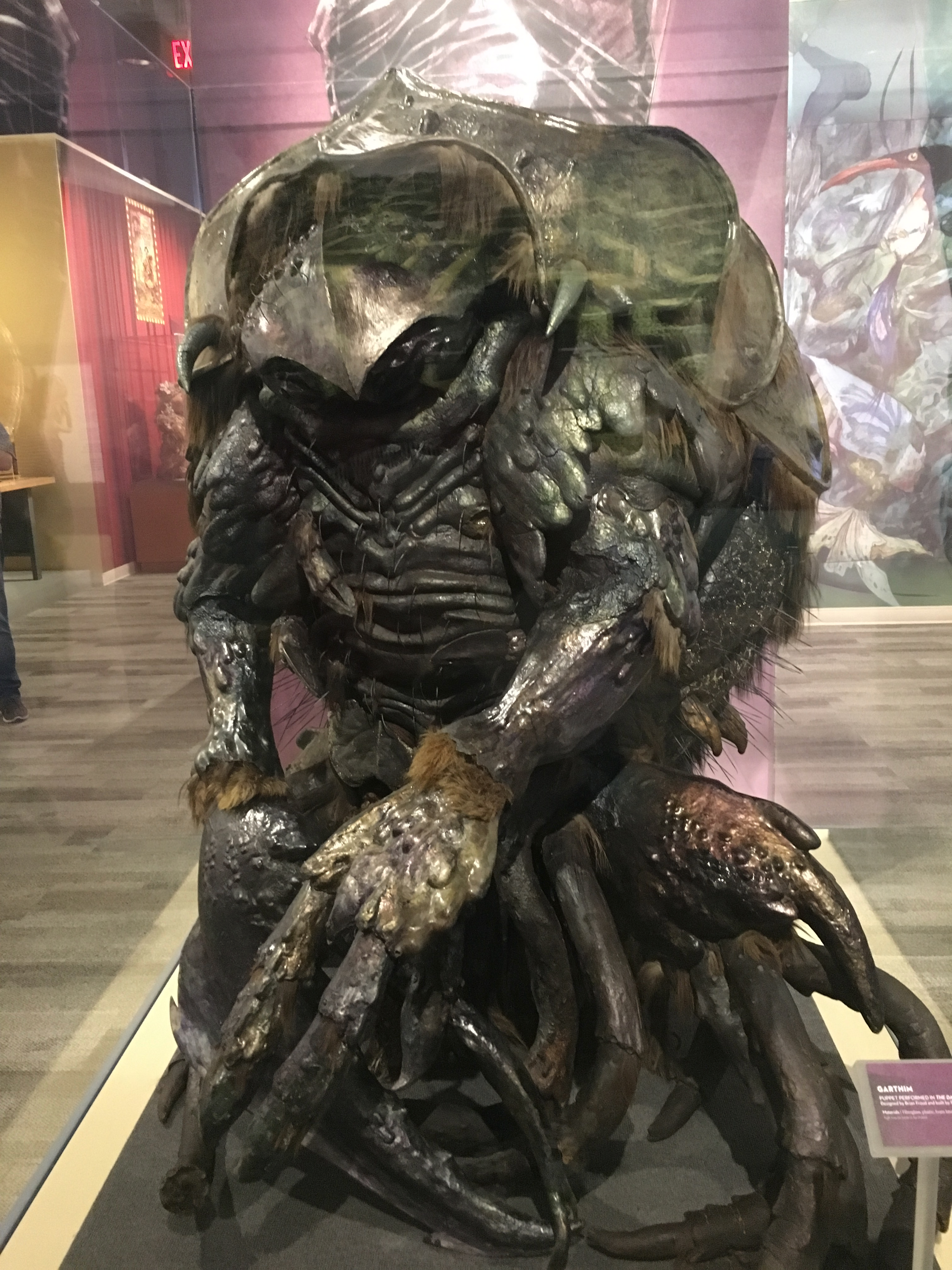
A Garthim puppet used in The Dark Crystal on display at the Center for Puppetry Arts

The Garthim are crustacean-like creatures that skekTek animated with the Dark Crystal to serve the Skeksis as their enforcers following the Gelfings' war declaration, each pieced together from the corpses of the spider-like Arathim and the humanoid Gruenaks in a form resembling sea creatures native to the urSkeks' world. The creation of the Garthim, as depicted in the first-season finale of Age of Resistance, led to the massacre of the Gelflings in the event referred to as the Garthim War. In the film, some are sent to capture Jen and end up bringing Aughra instead. The Garthim are instantly destroyed when Jen restored the Crystal, causing them to crumble along with the Skeksis architecture covering the Castle.

In The Dark Crystal: Age of Resistance, their origins are shown at the end of the first season as skekTek reveals the first Garthim (performed by Daniel Dewhirst) following the fight at Stone-in-the-Wood.

The conceptual designer for the Garthim was Brian Froud, who claimed to have had a fascination with lobsters, and Fred Nihda as the design and fabrication supervisor. As the suits were so heavy and prone to overheating, special harnesses were constructed to lift the performers in the Garthim suits and give them time to recover in between takes.

=== Raunip ===
Known as the "Son of Aughra", Raunip was born from the organic material of a meteorite that landed on Thra which Aughra brought to life. Unlike the more reserved Aughra, Raunip is more outgoing and with an adventurous curiosity, allowing him befriend Gelfings and other members of Thra's races. But Raunip earned the urSkeks' ire, his distrust of them playing a factor in the events that splintered the urSkeks into the Skeksis and the urRu/Mystics. Helping Aughra search for the lost shard, fruitlessly gathering similar shards, Raunip learned the Skeksis have enlisted the Gelflings to repel the invading Makrak horde in his absence.

Raunip attempted to convince the Gelfling elder Carn of not trusting the Skeksis, only to be rebuffed and accused of abandoning the Gelflings in their time of need. Raunip left Carn's village with her daughter Thall, who shared his suspicion over the Skeksis' motives. Taken to Valley of the urRu by urGoh where he is reunited with Kotha, Raunip tried convincing the urRu to stop the Skeksis from taking the Gelfling to war. When the Makraks reached the Valley the following day, Kotha's translation of their language allows Raunip to understand that Makraks were forced from their underground home with the destruction they caused motivated by fear of the surface world. While the urRu convinced the Skeksis to not exterminate the Makraks, Raunip participated in the peace talks and suggested their relocation to the region known as the Field of Fire. Raunip offered himself to guide the Makraks, knowing that he would never return or survive the journey despite receiving protective clothing and amulets from Thall. After bidding farewell to Aughra, who wept silently after he left, Raunip succeeds in his mission despite half of his face burnt and on the verge of death. He was last seen with a Fizzgig whom he recounting his tale to, resolving to live as long as he can while hoping to be remembered by those he left behind.

=== U-mun/Firelings ===
The Firelings, also known as the U-Mun, are an offshoot of the Gelfling race that reside in the underground region of Mithra where they are ruled by a council of three Ember Queens. Descended from Gelfling exiles that came to Mithra during the Age of Division, resembling Gelflings enveloped in flame, the Firelings adapted to their environment with their physiology altered to the point that they are unable to survive on Thra's surface without assistance and with exposure to water weakening them. While they resemble Gelflings, the female Firelings lack wings and the older members of the race had fin-like ears and sported a pair of antennae on their foreheads. Firelings also possess an ability similar to dreamfasting called "firefasting", that enabled them to learn of events and emotions from the past through flame.

==== Thurma ====
Thurma was a female Fireling who lived during the Age of Power. She was the heir of one of Mithra's Ember Queens and the first Fireling to leave her homeland since the race's creation, heading to Thra's surface world in a misguided quest to retrieve a shard from the Crystal in order to stop the Great Dim. Her efforts resulted in a brief return of the Skeksis and Mystics while learning her race's true origins through her relationship with the Gelfling Kensho.

Her return home after the crisis saw her confront Nita, a rival claimant to her position as Ember Queen, though the two eventually joined forces in order to stop the Fire That Stays from finishing what the Great Dim had started. She subsequently ruled Mithra jointly with Nita and Fiola.

=== Myth-Speaker ===
The Myth-Speaker (voiced by Sigourney Weaver) is the narrator of The Dark Crystal: Age of Resistance.

=== Vliste-Staba ===
Vliste-Staba (voiced by Theo Ogundipe) is a Sanctuary Tree that appears in The Dark Crystal: Age of Resistance and makes it home in Grot, being one of the many Great Trees that held the Darkening at bay for a millennium before it became too strong for them to subdue thanks to the Skeksis' experiments with the Dark Crystal. When the tree's death occurs, Vliste-Staba gives Deet the ability to absorb the Darkening into herself to purify the infected.

=== Lore ===
Lore (performed by Damian Farrell) is a sentient rock construct created by skekGra and urGoh. Debuting in The Dark Crystal: Age of Resistance, skekGra and urGoh placed him in a chamber beneath the Vapra Clan's throne room to await the Gefling that would revive him. Lore is awakened by Brea in "The First Thing I Remember is Fire," playing skekGra's recording to explain himself as her guide and protector in her journey to Circle of the Suns. Once Lore accomplishes his mission, Lore is deactivated by skekGra and remains in the Circle of the Suns for the duration of the first season.

=== Arathim ===
The Arathim are a spider-like race that appear in The Dark Crystal: Age of Resistance, all connected by a hivemind known as the Ascendency. The Arathim initially lived in the Caves of Grot until the Skeksis drove them into the wilds for refusing to submit and fought the Gelflings in many conflicts. The Arathim eventually become the Gelflings' allies in their rebellion against the Skeksis, who respond by having skekTek graft some Arathim corpses with the remains of one of his Gruenak slaves to create the first Garthim.

== Minor species ==
=== Crystal Bats ===
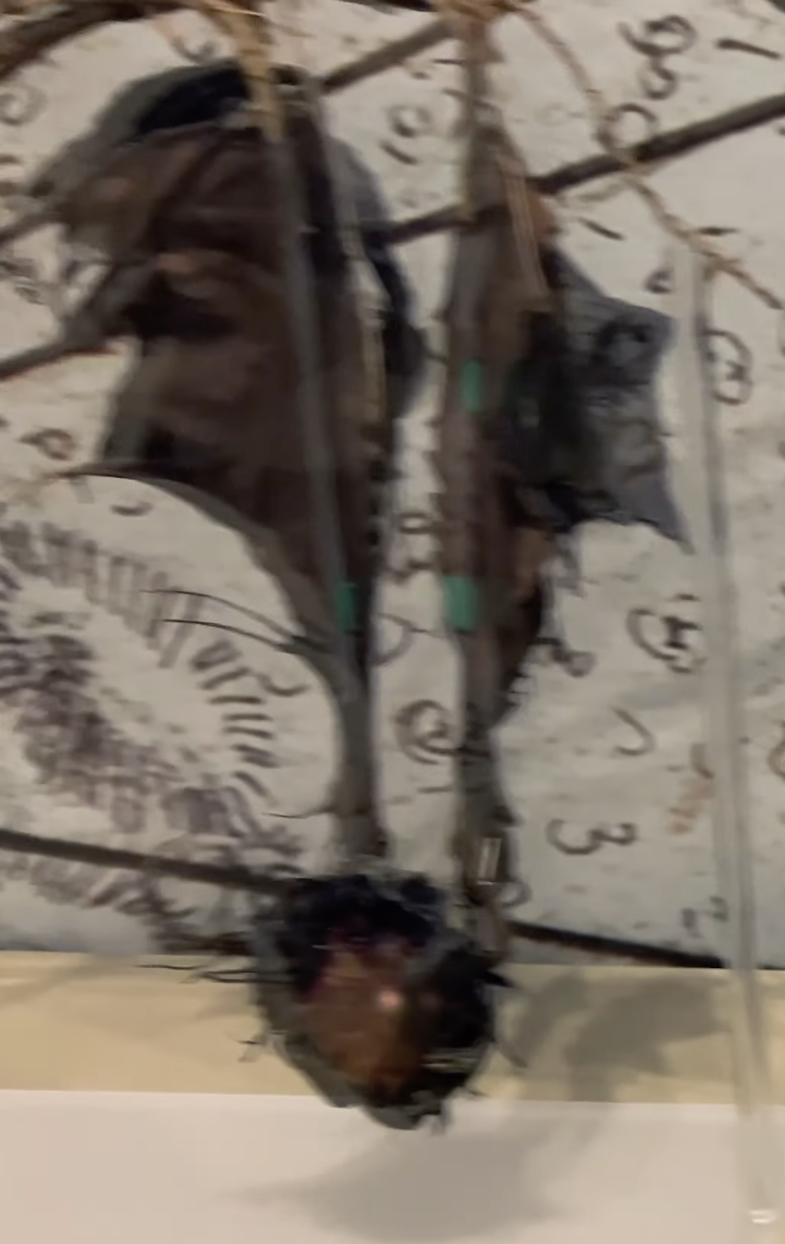
A Crystal Bat puppet used in The Dark Crystal on display at the Center for Puppetry Arts

The Crystal Bats are winged bat-like creatures with stick-like bodies which serve as spies for the Skeksis. When Aughra reminds skekUng of the prophecy that a Gelfling will end the rule of the Skeksis, he commands for Jen to be found. SkekZok commands the Crystal Bats in the banquet hall, yelling "Crystal Bats fly! Search the land, search the water, search the sky!" and the Bats fly from the Castle of the Crystal. While Jen and Kira make music in their boat on the river, Fizzgig alerts them to a Crystal Bat in he sky. Kira hits the Bat with a slingshot and it plummets into the river.

In the film, Kira notes to Jen that "what [the bats] see, the Skeksis see too". The World of the Dark Crystal by Brian Froud clarifies that the Crystal Bats were bred by the Skeksis to carry lenses of artificial Crystal that relay whatever they see to the Dark Crystal.

=== Landstriders ===
Landstriders are quadrupeds native to the forests of Thra, having white skin, vaguely sloth-like faces, long rabbit ear-like appendages, and extremely long and powerful limbs with which they move very fast over vast distances. They are ridden by Jen and Kira in the film, and identified by Froud as regular mounts of Gelflings. Landstriders are very tough and their limbs can be used as formidable weapons as seen when they, Jen, Kira, and Fizzgig are attacked by the Garthim. One Landstrider is taken down while another falls off the cliff with a Garthim. As a result, Landstriders are perhaps the only natives of Thra able to oppose the Garthim. A dead Landstrider's flesh is highly prized for the Skeksis.

In the production of The Dark Crystal, the Landstriders were performed by professional stiltwalkers operating on four stilts like Robbie Barnett, Swee Lim, and Hugh Spight. A digitally-erased safety wire, pulley system, and the associated crane were used to help perform the Landstriders so that the performer will not accidentally fall and injure themselves. The World of The Dark Crystal revealed that Robbie Barnett helped to conceive the Landstriders due to him being an expert at stiltwalking as well as the safety information that Jim Henson revealed to make sure the Landstrider performers do not get hurt.

The Landstriders appear in The Dark Crystal: Age of Resistance. Ordon and some Crystal Guard members rode some Landstriders when escorting skekOk and skekLach to Ha'rar. The Landstriders also took the brunt of the Darkening.

=== Nebrie ===
The Nebrie are large amphibians apparent in marshes and swamps. Although they appear menacing, the Nebries are not especially aggressive and appear to be vegetarian. A Nebrie infant is seen roasted on the dining table of the Skeksis in the Castle of the Crystal, and the novel depicts Nebries as the Skeksis' food of choice.

The Nebrie was designed by Brian Froud and the design and fabrication supervisors were Tim Miller and John Coppinger.

=== Gruenaks ===
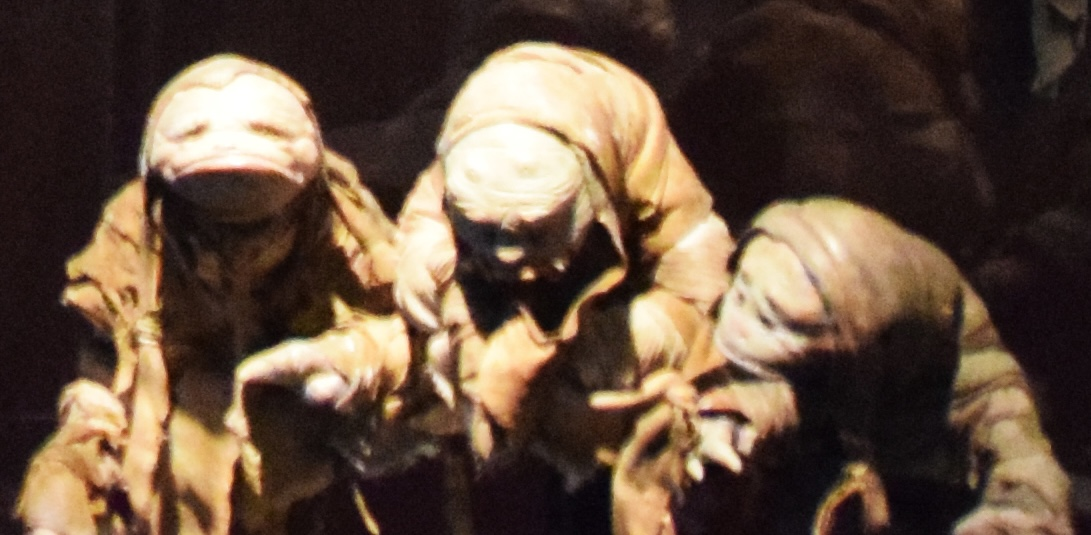
Maquettes of Gruenaks, created for The Dark Crystal: Age of Resistance, on display at the Museum of the Moving Image

The Gruenaks are a race of Gelfling-size brutes with superhuman strength and mechanical minds that have been driven to near extinction. In the first season of Age of Resistance, skekSil provided two known Gruenak survivors (performed by Kevin Clash and Neil Sterenberg) with stitched mouths to assist skekTek in repairing his essence extraction machine and improve on it. The two Gruenaks were also manipulated by skekSil with the promise of their freedom, openly rebelling when skekSil revealed to them he had no intention of setting them free in the immediate future. This resulted with the Gruenaks being killed by skekTek, who threw one down the Crystal Shaft and then used the other's corpse after beating him to death in the creation of the Garthim.

=== Other life forms ===
Both the film and Age of Resistance depict the wildlife of Thra. Among these creatures are plants able to fly; flowers able to retract their petals; thick tree-like stalks that expand and compress; mobile vine-like or grass-like creatures; rodent-like animals; and birds with a large horn instead of a beak.

- Armaligs: Pillbug-like creatures that the Skeksis use as the wheels of their carriages.
- Crystal Skimmers: Large flying stingray-like creatures that serve as the Dousan Clan's mode of transportation across the Crystal Sea.
- Gobbles: An assortment of carnivorous plants that will gobble up whoever falls into them and drag them below the liquidy surface that they stick out of. Some Gobbles surround a gigantic ambush predator which snares prey that wander into its mouth.
- Locksnake: The Locksnake is a type of small golden snake that is used to lock doors as seen in The Dark Crystal: Age of Resistance. skekTek used a Locksnake to lock up a vial containing Mira's essence in a cabinet for safekeeping. The Locksnake was later eaten by skekSil.
- Nurloc: Worm-like creatures native to the Caves of Grot.
- Peeper Beetles: The Peeper Beetles are a type of Thra beetle native to the Crystal Desert which feed on soft flesh, preferring eyes. In The Dark Crystal: Age of Resistance, one Peeper Beetle is kept and starved by the Skeksis for use in their disciplinary actions with skekTek losing his right eye during one such occasion.
