= Tactical Force =

- Directed by: Adamo Paolo Cultraro
- Written by: Adamo Paolo Cultraro
- Produced by: Jack Nasser; Joseph Nasser; Jack Heller; Dallas Sonnier
- Starring: Steve Austin; Michael Jai White; Michael Shanks; Keith Jardine; Michael Eklund
- Cinematography: Bruce Chun
- Edited by: Gordon Rempel; Rick Martin
- Music by: Michael Richard Plowman
- Production companies: Nasser Entertainment; Caliber Media Company
- Distributed by: Vivendi Entertainment
- Release date: August 9, 2011
- Running time: 91 minutes
- Countries: Canada; United States
- Language: English

Tactical Force is a 2011 Canadian-American action film written and directed by Adamo Paolo Cultraro, and starring Steve Austin, Michael Jai White, Michael Shanks, Keith Jardine, Michael Eklund, Darren Shahlavi and Lexa Doig.

The film concerns a rogue SWAT team sent to an abandoned compound with blank weapons for retraining, only to find themselves caught in the middle of a war between two gangs armed with fully functioning guns, who are both after a mysterious briefcase. It premiered in the United States on 9 August 2011.

== Plot ==
Captain Frank Tate leads a four-member SWAT team consisting of Tony Hunt, Jannard and Blanco. They manage to stop the robbery of a grocery store and save the hostages, but their reckless methods cause substantial property damage and emotional distress to the owner. Their superior gets angry and orders them to go through retraining, which they do not take seriously.

Ilya Kalashnikova and Demetrius, two Russian mobsters, bring a captive named Kenny to a warehouse outside the city. They demand Kenny recovers the "item" he has hidden there. Two members of the Italian mafia, Lampone and Storato, enter the same facility and start searching on their own. The two parties run into each other. Tate's team arrives on the same premises, and begins training with blank cartridges, not knowing about the events that just transpired.

Both criminal parties hide from the SWAT team, but tension rises between them. Blanco goes to check on the resulting noise, and is fatally shot, which alerts his colleagues. The Russians and the Italians realize that their law enforcement counterparts do not have real bullets, and form a fragile alliance to eliminate them. The SWAT team retreats to the upper level, locking the door behind them.

It is revealed that Demetrius stole the item from Lampone, before Kenny stole it from the former. Kenny reveals that the item is hidden somewhere beyond the locked door. Demetrius calls for backup. Tate and his squad realize that they must return to their truck to retrieve actual ammunition and call in police reinforcements. Kalashnikova and Storato bring the truck inside the warehouse. More members of the Russian mob, headed by a man named Vladimir, arrive. Vladimir decides to attack the upper floor through outside windows. Lampone secretly tells Storato that he has called his own operatives in order to secure the item for themselves.

Tate manages to reach the truck but finds the radio damaged. Hunt and Jannard fight off Vladimir's men. Jannard is nearly overpowered by Vladimir, before Tate returns and kills him. The mafia's reinforcements, led by tough guy Tagliaferro, show up and find another point of entry on the building's roof.

Tate decides to free Kenny, who gives him the briefcase containing the item. Kenny shows the SWAT team a hidden tunnel leading outside the hangar. Tate hides the item, before the group gets split. Tagliaferro knocks Tate unconscious, and hands him back to Kalashnikova and Demetrius. The others are captured by Storato and taken to another warehouse at the opposite end of the tunnel, where Lampone awaits. Lampone shoots Kenny, apparently killing him, and threatens to do the same to Jannard. Hunt agrees to go fetch the item in exchange for her safety, under escort from Storato. But he manages to kill Storato, neutralize Lampone and free Jannard.

Tagliaferro and his men return to Demetrius, Kalashnikova and Tate with orders to eliminate all three, but they escape in the truck and meet up with Hunt and Jannard at the other hangar. Tagliaferro catches up to them, and a final confrontation ensues. Tate kills Tagliaferro while Demetrius, Kalashnikova and Lampone are arrested.

Tate, Hunt and Jannard are congratulated by their superior. Kenny is revealed to be alive and an undercover FBI agent. He implies that Lampone is another undercover agent. The team is ordered to remain silent about the events.

== Cast ==
- Steve Austin as SWAT Captain Frank Tate
- Michael Jai White as SWAT Sergeant Tony Hunt
- Michael Shanks as Demetrius
- Keith Jardine as Tagliaferro
- Michael Eklund as Kenny
- Lexa Doig as Police Officer Third Class SWAT Member Jannard
- Darren Shahlavi as Storato
- Adrian Holmes as Lampone
- Steve Bacic as Police Officer Third Class SWAT Member Blanco
- Candace Elaine as Ilya Kalashnikova
- Peter Kent as Vladimir

== Production ==
The film was developed independently by writer/director Cultraro, under the working title of Hangar 14. It was originally slated to star Cuba Gooding, Jr. The film later found financing from Jack and Joseph Nasser, who had inked WWE star Steve Austin to a multi-picture deal in 2008. It marked the fourth collaboration between Austin and the Nasser brothers. Like their other movies, it was shot around Vancouver, British Columbia, under the banner of Nasser Entertainment's Canadian subsidiary. Filming took place during snow season, which greatly contrasted with the light clothing and mild Los Angeles climate depicted in the film.

Co-star Michael Jai White enjoyed Michael Eklund's performance as the weaselly Kenny, and asked Universal to cast him as main antagonist Jobe Davis in his 2020 film Welcome to Sudden Death.

== Release ==
Tactical Force was released theatrically in the United Arab Emirates on 12 April 2012, ranking fourth at the box office behind Get the Gringo, StreetDance 2 and The Hunger Games.

In the United States, the film was released on home video on 9 August 2011 by Vivendi Entertainment. Early copies came with a limited slipcover. It reached number 10 in the national DVD sales chart for its week of release. Canadian release followed on 23 August 2011. It was handled by Entertainment One, who also took care of the film in the UK and other international territories.

== Reception ==
Tactical Force received mixed reviews. The Movie Scene and Todd Rigney of Beyond Hollywood both deemed the film "absurd", while mentioning that its implausibility somehow contributed to its entertainment factor. Genre critic Outlaw Vern was let down by the film's mundane locations. Movie Mavericks was more positive, calling it "well produced", and Explosive Action praised the inclusion of an extensive car chase in an otherwise stripped-down siege film.
Tactical Force's flashy editing was widely criticized, but its high action quotient earned it moderate praise, with JoBlo calling it "a step above the rest [of Austin vehicles]". Jeffrey Kauffman of Blu-ray.com opined that "Tactical Force looks fantastic. Cultraro the director simply needs to hire a better writer than Cultraro next time."

The film earned notice for its inclusion of an Italian character of color, a relatively uncommon occurrence in popular media. It also elicited several comparisons with Walter Hill's 1992 feature Trespass.

== See also ==
- Recoil (2011 film), a re-teaming of some of this film's principals
