= Lessons Learned (film) =

- Film poster
- Directed by: Toby Froud
- Written by: Toby Froud
- Produced by: Sherri Morgan
- Starring: William Todd-Jones; David Skelly; Bryonie Arnold; Brandie Sylfae; Scott Woodard; Mark Lewis
- Cinematography: Scott Tebeau
- Edited by: Margaret Lily Andres
- Release date: April 1, 2014 (United States)
- Running time: 16 minutes
- Country: United States
- Language: English

Lessons Learned is a 2014 fantasy short film written and directed by Toby Froud. The film's visuals were achieved widely through the use of puppetry and animatronics.

== Cast ==
- William Todd-Jones as Boy
- David Skelly as Digby
- Bryonie Arnold as Spider Fate
- Brandie Sylfae as Spider Fate
- Scott Woodard as King
- Mark Lewis as Grandpa

== Production ==
Lessons Learned was written and directed by Toby Froud, son of the fantasy illustrators and puppet makers Brian and Wendy Froud. Toby, who had appeared as the baby Toby Williams in Jim Henson's Labyrinth, had developed an interest in puppetry from an early age. The film was executive produced by Heather Henson, daughter of the puppeteers Jim and Jane Henson, who financed the film as part of her Handmade Puppet Dreams series.

To raise money for the film, Froud launched a Kickstarter campaign on July 2, 2013, with a goal of $25,000. The campaign closed on August 1, 2013, having successfully raised $53,330.

== Release ==
The film premiered in April 2014. It also played at the Portland Film Festival in August 2014.

== Awards ==
Year	Organisation	Category	Recipient(s)	Result
2014	Dragon Con Independent Film Festival	Best Animated Film		Won
2014	FilmQuest	Best Art Direction/Production Design	Scott Foster and Toby Froud	Won
2014	FilmQuest	Best Makeup Effects	Toby Froud	Won
2014	FilmQuest	Best Fantasy Short Film		Nominated
2015	Pixie Awards	Visual Effects (Gold)	Stripey Pajama Productions	Won
