= Candace Elaine =

Canadian actress

- Occupation: Actress
- Years active: 2004–present

Candace Elaine is a Canadian actress who has become a naturalized American citizen. Elaine is an accomplished dancer, fashionista, and stage and film actor. She most recently appeared opposite Stone Cold Steve Austin, Michael Shanks, and Michael Jai White in the action feature Tactical Force, playing the role of Ilya Kalashnikova.

Elaine worked with Tom Sizemore on Corrado, and appeared in Season 3 of Celebrity Rehab and Sober House in support of him.

== Filmography ==
- The Ensnaring (Short Film, 2006)
- Hard Sand (TV Pilot, 2006)
- Credere, Obbedire, Combattere! (Documentary Feature, 2007)
- Corrado, feature film
- Tactical Force (2011), feature film
- Kids vs Monsters (2015), feature film
