= Walter Midener =

American sculptor

Walter Midener (1912–1998) was a German born American artist. He studied at the Berlin Academy of Arts (1932–1936), and received a Master of Arts (M.A.) from Wayne State University (1950). Midener settled in Detroit, Michigan where he became an influential sculptor and teacher. He was the head of the Sculpture Department of the Art School of the Society of Arts and Crafts, and president of The Center for Creative Studies. He received an honorary doctorate of fine arts from the Center for Creative Studies in 1997.

Midener was married to the collage artist Margaret "Peggy" Midener (née Mackenzie; 1925–2016) from 1947 until his death. Their daughter Wendy Froud is an internationally exhibited sculptor and doll artist, and the designer of puppets for films such as The Dark Crystal, Labyrinth, The Muppet Movie, and The Empire Strikes Back.
