= Adamo Paolo Cultraro =

American film director

Adamo Paolo Cultraro is an Italian–American filmmaker, director, writer, and producer. He is the founder of Taormina Films, a production company.

Cultraro was born in Toronto, Ontario, Canada, to Italian parents. His first language was Italian and he still speaks it fluently. Cultraro has directed webisodes, a TV pilot, numerous shorts, and the feature film Corrado. Cultraro's 2011 action feature film, Tactical Force was released by Vivendi Entertainment. Tactical Force debuted at #24 on IMDb's Star Meter and went on to become #10 in the top ten best selling DVDs in the United States for the month of August 2011, making it among the most successful DVD releases of a Stone Cold Steve Austin picture ever produced.

== Filmography ==
- The Ensnaring (Short Film, 2006)
- Hard Sand (TV Pilot, 2006)
- Credere, Obbedire, Combattere! – known as Believe, Obey, Fight in North America (Documentary Feature, 2007)
- Corrado, feature film
- Tactical Force (2011), feature film
