= Mallory O'Meara =

American writer and podcaster

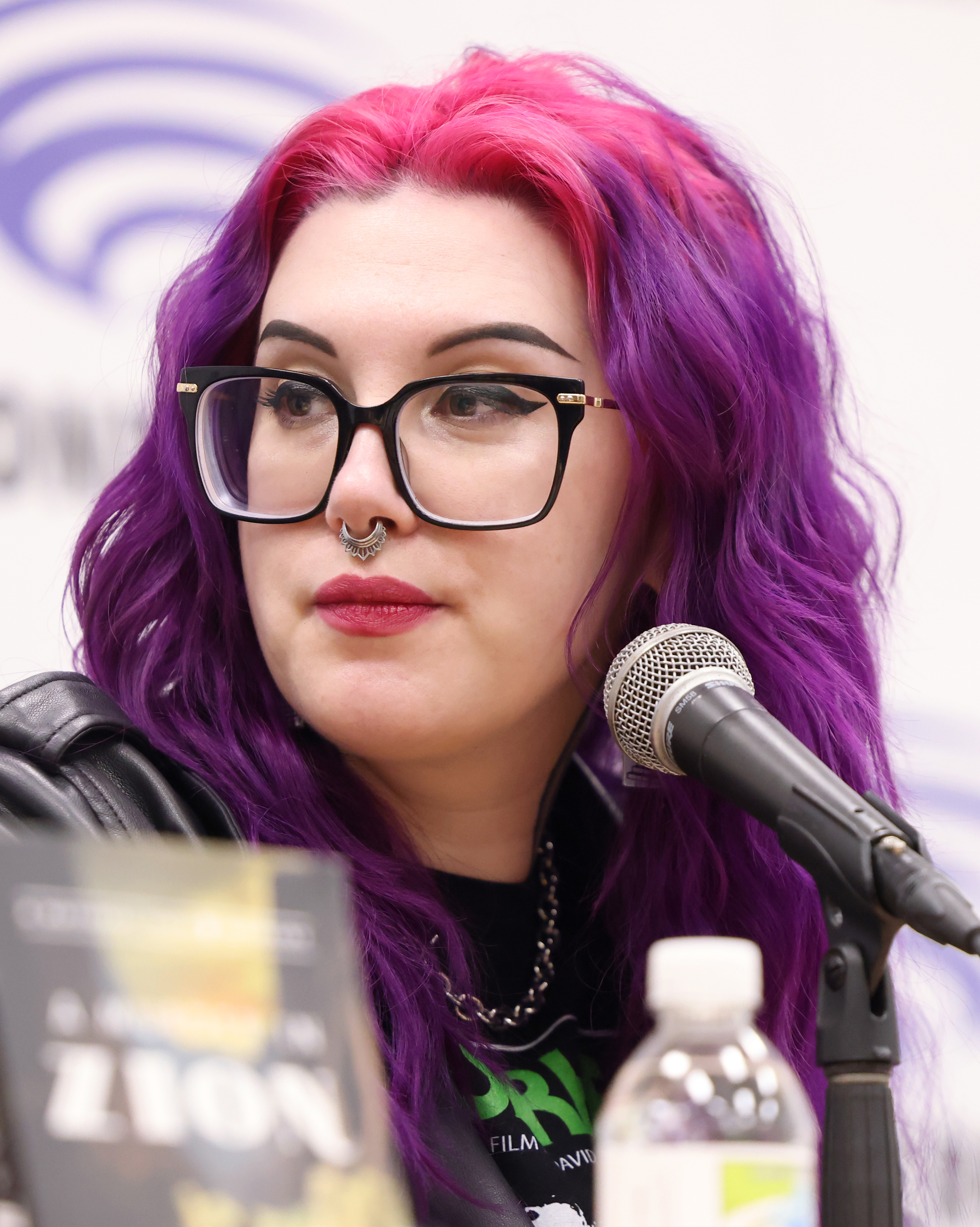
- O'Meara in 2025
- Occupations: Writer; Podcaster
- Writing career
- Genre: Non-Fiction
- Notable awards: Rondo Hatton Classic Horror Award, 2019, for The Lady from the Black Lagoon; James Beard Foundation Award, 2022, for Girly Drinks

Mallory O'Meara is an American non-fiction writer and podcaster.

== Career ==
O'Meara is the author of The Lady from the Black Lagoon (2019), which serves as a biography of make-up artist Milicent Patrick as well as a chronicle of O'Meara's search for information about Patrick.

The book includes evidence that Patrick designed the iconic Gill-man from Creature from the Black Lagoon, and that Bud Westmore, a member of the influential Westmore family of Hollywood make-up artists, worked to deny her credit for this achievement. The book was nominated for Hugo and Locus awards, and won the 2019 Rondo Hatton Classic Horror Award for Book of the Year.

O'Meara's second book, Girly Drinks, about the history of women making and drinking alcohol throughout the world, was published in 2021 by Hanover Square Press. Girly Drinks won a 2022 James Beard Foundation Award.

O'Meara's third book, Girls Make Movies: A Follow-Your-Own-Path Guide for Aspiring Young Filmmakers, was published by Running Press on May 23, 2023. Girls Make Movies is illustrated by comic book creator Jen Vaughn.

Since 2017 O'Meara has co-hosted Reading Glasses, a weekly podcast about reading and books, with filmmaker Brea Grant. Reading Glasses is part of the Maximum Fun network.

Brea Grant and O'Meara published The No-Pressure Book Journal: A No-Guilt, No-Shame, No-Stress Journal to Help You Read Better and Enjoy Books Again through the Weldon Owen imprint of Simon & Schuster on February 4, 2025. Rebecca Santo illustrated The No-Pressure Book Journal.

Daughter of Daring: The Trick-Riding, Train-Leaping, Road-Racing Life of Helen Gibson, Hollywood’s First Stuntwoman was published by Hanover Square Press, an imprint of Harper Collins Publishers, on February 18, 2025. Daughter of Daring chronicles the life of Helen Gibson, who excelled "in the early days of the twentieth-century silent film scene as a rodeo rider, background actor, stunt double, and eventually one of the era’s biggest action stars."

From 2013 to 2019, O'Meara also worked as a writer and producer for Dark Dunes Productions in Los Angeles.

== Works ==
- The Lady from the Black Lagoon (2019, Hanover Square Press; ISBN 9781335010131)
- Girly Drinks: A Women's History of Drinking (2021, Hanover Square Press; ISBN 9781335282408)
- Girls Make Movies: A Follow-Your-Own-Path Guide for Aspiring Young Filmmakers (2023, Running Press; ISBN 9780762478989)
- The No-Pressure Book Journal: A No-Guilt, No-Shame, No-Stress Journal to Help You Read Better and Enjoy Books Again (2025, Weldon Owen; ISBN 979-8-88674-194-0)
- Daughter of Daring: The Trick-Riding, Train-Leaping, Road-Racing Life of Helen Gibson, Hollywood’s First Stuntwoman (2025, Hanover Square Press; ISBN 978-1-335-00793-3)
