= List of past Minicons =

This list of past Minicons is in chronological order (which is not the same as numerical order). Location, dates, and guests of honor are noted when known.

No.	Date/Year	Location	Theme	Guests of Honor	Special Guest
1	January 6, 1968 (Note: This Minicon did not take place over Easter weekend) (Note: The only Minicon to be only one day long)	Coffman Union at the University of Minnesota	A Strange New World of Science Fiction	Gordon R. Dickson, Charles De Vet, Clifford Simak	
2	April 4-6, 1969	Andrews Hotel; Minneapolis, MN		Gordon R. Dickson, Charles De Vet, Clifford Simak	
3	April 3-5, 1970	Dyckman Hotel; Minneapolis, MN	The Minneapolis in '73 Convention!	Poul Anderson, Gordon R. Dickson, Clifford Simak	
4	June 18-20, 1971	Curtis Hotel; Minneapolis, MN	The Minneapolis in '73 Convention!	Lin Carter	
5	October 15-17, 1971 (Note: Minicon 5 and 9 took place in the fall. After Minicon 9 fall conventions ran by MNStF would go by different names than Minicon, collectively referred to as "fallcons".)	Andrews Hotel; Minneapolis, MN	The Genghiscon!	— (Note: Volsted Gridban was listed, but it did not refer to one of the authors who had used that pseudonym being the guest; there was no guest of honor at this Minicon.)	
6	April 7-9, 1972	Andrews Hotel; Minneapolis, MN	The Stereo-opticon!	Ruth Berman	
7	April 20-22, 1973	Hyatt Lodge; Minneapolis, MN	The Minneapolis in '73 Con!	Larry Niven (pro), Rusty Hevelin (fan)	
8	April 12-14, 1974	Dyckman Hotel; Minneapolis, MN	Kelly Freas (pro), Bob Tucker (fan)		
9	October 11-13, 1974	Dyckman Hotel; Minneapolis, MN		Judy-Lynn del Rey and Lester del Rey	
10	April 18-20, 1975	Holiday Inn; Minneapolis, MN		Poul Anderson (pro), Gordon Dickson (fan), Lester del Rey (toastmaster)	
11	April 16-18, 1976	Leamington Hotel; Minneapolis, MN		Edmond Hamilton (pro), Leigh Brackett (pro), Leigh and Norb Couch (fans), Jackie Franke and Rusty Hevelin (toastmasters)	
12	April 8-10, 1977	Leamington Hotel; Minneapolis, MN	The Dododecacon	Ben Bova (pro), Buck Coulson and Juanita Coulson (fans), Joe Haldeman (toastmaster)	
13	March 24-26, 1978	Leamington Hotel; Minneapolis, MN	Nothing is as it seems	Samuel R. Delany (pro), Spider Robinson (fan), Bob Tucker (artist), Krissy (toastmaster)	
15 (Note: From Minicon 15 to 18 the numbers get a bit shuffled. The fallcon "Anokon 1" was originally going to be named Minicon 14, causing it to be skipped in planning for Minicon 15.)	April 13-15, 1979	Radisson; Minneapolis, MN	The other 10%	Theodore Sturgeon (pro), Tom Digby (fan), Rick Sternbach (artist), Robert E. Vardeman (toastmaster)	
16	April 4-6, 1980	Radisson; Minneapolis, MN	Déjà Vu	C. J. Cherryh (pro), Jon Singer (fan), Ken Fletcher (artist), Nate Bucklin (musician), Bob Tucker (toastmaster)	
17	April 17-19, 1981	Radisson; Minneapolis, MN		Jack Vance (pro), Jerry Boyajian (fan), Reed Waller (musician), Kathy Marschall (artist)	
14	April 9-11, 1982	Radisson; St. Paul, MN	Forward, Into the Past	John Varley (pro), Clifford D. Simak (fan), Spider Robinson (musician)	
19	April 1-3, 1983	Radisson; St. Paul, MN	Backward, Into the Future	Larry Niven (pro), Pamela Dean and David Dyer-Bennet (fans), Dave Sim (artist), Spider John Koerner (music), Steven Brust (toastmaster), Nostradamus (proxy)	
18	April 20-22, 1984	Leamington Hotel; Minneapolis, MN	We know what we're doing and you don't. Trust us.	Chelsea Quinn Yarbro (pro), Dave Wixon (fan), Stephen Hickman (artist), S.P. Somtow (musician), Rusty Hevelin (toastmaster), Bob Tucker ("smooth")	
20	April 5-7, 1985	Radisson South; Bloomington, MN (Note: The "Radisson South", "Sheraton Bloomington", and "DoubleTree Minneapolis South" are all the same hotel. It is currently operated as a DoubleTree by Hilton, but is commonly referred to as the "RadishTree" in reference to the history Minicon has with the hotel.)	Let's you and I get normal for a change	James P. Hogan (pro), The Permanent Floating Riot Club (fan group, the name is a tribute to Larry Niven), The White Women (musicians), Stu Shiffman (artist), Jerry Stearns and Kara Dalkey (toastmasters)	
21	March 28-30, 1986	Radisson South; Bloomington, MN	Now we're just immoral and fattening	Damon Knight and Kate Wilhelm (pro), Denny Lien (fan), Ken Fletcher (artist), Anne Passovoy (musician), Diane Duane (toastmaster)	
22	April 17-19, 1987	Radisson South; Bloomington, MN	Still Crazy After All These Years	David Brin (pro), Fred Haskell (fan), Erin McKee (artist), Jerry Stearns (music), Robert Bloch (toastmaster)	
23	April 1-3, 1988	Radisson South; Bloomington, MN	Spring Forward, Fall Over	Eleanor Arnason (author), Eric Heideman (fan), Frederik Pohl (editor), Crystal Marvig (artist), Richard Feynman (science, posthumous)	
24	March 24-26, 1989	Radisson South; Bloomington, MN	Zen and the Art of Fan Maintenance	Harry Harrison, George "Lan" Laskowski, Fritz Leiber, Barry B. Longyear	
25	April 13-15, 1990	Radisson South; Bloomington, MN	The Silver Edition	Jane Yolen, Kim Stanley Robinson (author), Patrick Price ("arthur"), David Thayer a.k.a. Teddy Harvia (artist), DavE Romm (fan), Earl Joseph (science)	
26	March 29-31, 1991	Radisson South; Bloomington, MN	Think of it as Evolution in Action	George Alec Effinger (author), David Cherry (artist), Al Kuhfeld, Ph.D. (science), Suzanne V. Tompkins and Jerry Kaufman (fans), Jon Singer (lunch)	
27	April 17-19, 1992	Radisson South; Bloomington, MN	Don't Ever Be A Dodo	Lois McMaster Bujold (author), Ctein (artist), Dave Van Ronk (music)	
28	April 9-11, 1993	Radisson South; Bloomington, MN	Suite, Savage Minicon	Susan Allison (editor), Diane Duane (author), Peter Morwood (author), Kathy Mar (music), Don Fitch (bless his sweet heart), John M. Ford (interesting person)	
29	April 1-3, 1994	Radisson South; Bloomington, MN	It seemed like a good idea at the time	Tom Doherty (publisher), Jack Williamson (author), Rusty Hevelin (fan), Phil Foglio (artist)	
30	April 13-16, 1995	Radisson South; Bloomington, MN	Some Assembly Required or "Would You Like Fries With That?"	Vernor Vinge (author), Robert L. Forward (science), Jody Lee (artist), The Bhigg House (fan group)	
31	April 5–7, 1996	Radisson South; Bloomington, MN	Coming to a Galaxy Near You	Suzette Haden Elgin (author), Ed Emshwiller (artist, posthumous), Joe Siclari & Edie Stern (fans), David Ossman (audio)	
32	March 28–30, 1997	Radisson South; Bloomington, MN	Even Chaos has a Pattern	Algis Budrys (author), C. J. Cherryh (author), Tom Doherty (publisher), Tom Lopez (audio), Patrick Nielsen Hayden (fan), Teresa Nielsen Hayden (fan), Michael Swanwick	
33	April 10–12, 1998	Radisson South; Bloomington, MN	Heisenberg Probably Slept Here	Gardner Dozois (publishing), David Langford (fan), John M. Ford (toastmaster)	
34	April 2–4, 1999	Hilton & Towers; Minneapolis, MN		Octavia E. Butler (author), Mark & Priscilla Olson (fans), David Nee (bookseller)	
35	April 21–23, 2000	Hilton & Towers; Minneapolis, MN		Maureen F. McHugh (author), John Berkey (artist), Lenny Bailes (fan)	
36	April 13–15, 2001	Hilton & Towers; Minneapolis, MN		Ken MacLeod (author), Jo Walton (fan), Leslie Fish (musician)	
37	March 29–31, 2002	Hilton & Towers; Minneapolis, MN		Emma Bull (author), Will Shetterly (author), Arthur Hlavaty (fan), Rick Berry (artist)	
38	April 18–20, 2003	Millennium Hotel; Minneapolis, MN		Robert J. Sawyer (author), Carolyn Clink (poet), Sue Mason (fan), Steve Macdonald (musician)	
39	April 9–11, 2004	Millennium Hotel; Minneapolis, MN		Walter Jon Williams (author), Sharyn November (editor), Deb Geisler (fan)	
40	March 25–27, 2005	Sheraton; Bloomington, MN	Minicon Fortean	Terry Pratchett (author), Fastner & Larson (artists), James Young (fan)	
41	April 14–16, 2006	Sheraton; Bloomington, MN	XLi, Robot	Harlan Ellison (author), John Picacio (artist), Doug Friauf (fan)	
42	April 6–8, 2007	Sheraton; Bloomington, MN	And the question was...? (in reference to the number 42)	Charles de Lint (author), Charles Vess (artist)	
43	March 21–23, 2008	Sheraton; Bloomington, MN	Digging up the Future	Alastair Reynolds (author), Wayne Barlowe (artist, in absentia), Shawna McCarthy (editor), Nate Bucklin (fan)	
44	April 10–12, 2009	Sheraton; Bloomington, MN		Karl Schroeder (author), Stephan Martinere (artist, in absentia), Seth Shostak (scientist)	
45	April 2–4, 2010	Sheraton; Bloomington, MN		Brandon Sanderson (author), Daniel Dos Santos (artist)	Moshe Feder (editor)
46	April 22–24, 2011	Sheraton; Bloomington, MN	Not yet dead from the neck up	Charles Stross, (author in absentia), John Scalzi, (author), Chas Somdahl, (musician)	
47	April 6–8, 2012	DoubleTree Minneapolis South; Bloomington, MN	The minions are coming...	Ted Chiang (author), Christopher J Garcia (fanzine), Frank Wu (artist),	Brianna "Spacekat" Wu (game developer)
48	March 29–31, 2013	DoubleTree Minneapolis South; Bloomington, MN	The Game of Life	Julie Czerneda (author), Richard Tatge (fan)	
49	April 17–20, 2014	DoubleTree Minneapolis South; Bloomington, MN	Pirates and Airships	Catherynne Valente (author), Janny Wurts (author), Don Maitz (artist)	
50	April 2–5, 2015 (Note: A four day long convention, instead of the usual three days.)	DoubleTree Minneapolis South; Bloomington, MN	The Gold Edition	Jane Yolen (author), Larry Niven author, Brandon Sanderson (author), Tom Doherty (publisher), Adam Stemple (musician), Michael Whelan (artist)	
51	March 25–27, 2016	DoubleTree Minneapolis South; Bloomington, MN	Zombies and Fairies and Mermaids, Oh My!	Seanan McGuire (author), Sara Butcher Burrier (artist)	
52	April 14–16, 2017	DoubleTree Minneapolis South; Bloomington, MN		Brother Guy Consolmagno (scientist)	Moshe Feder (editor)
53	March 30-April 1, 2018	Double Tree Park Place; St. Louis Park, MN	The Pedantic One	Rachel Swirsky (author), Lyda Morehouse (author)	Jon Arfstrom (artist, posthumous)
54	April 19-21, 2019	Double Tree Park Place; St. Louis Park, MN	Purple	Naomi Kritzer (author), David de Vries (illustrator)	Tom Fleming (artist)
55	April 15-17, 2022 (Note: Originally scheduled for Easter weekend 2020, this convention was postponed twice because of the COVID-19 pandemic. As there were previously two years with two Minicons, the number is now actually the years the convention has been running for.)	Double Tree Park Place; St. Louis Park, MN	Green	Jo Walton (author), Elise Matthesen (artist)	
56	April 7-9, 2023	Double Tree Park Place; St. Louis Park, MN		Martha Wells (author), Sara Felix (artist), Greg Ketter (fan)	
57	March 29-31, 2024	Double Tree Park Place; St. Louis Park, MN		Ursula Vernon (author & illustrator), Jeremy Brett (archivist), Tim Griffin (music)	Jeffery Angles (Japanese scholar)
58	April 18-20, 2025	DoubleTree Minneapolis South; Bloomington, MN		Wesley Chu (author), The Faithful Sidekicks (music)	Michael Busch (astronomer)
59	April 3-5, 2026	DoubleTree Minneapolis South; Bloomington, MN		Patricia Wrede (author), Matt Leacock (gaming)	
60	March 25-28, 2027	DoubleTree Minneapolis South; Bloomington, MN		Geri Sullivan (fan)	
