= Dog Land =

Dog Land, Dogland or Doglands can refer to:

- Dog Land (app), a dog-themed iOS application
- Dog Land (attraction), a defunct tourist attraction in Chiefland, Florida
- Dogland, a 1997 novel by Will Shetterly
- Doglands, a 2011 novel by Tim Willocks

== See also ==
- Doggerland
