= Juniper (given name) =

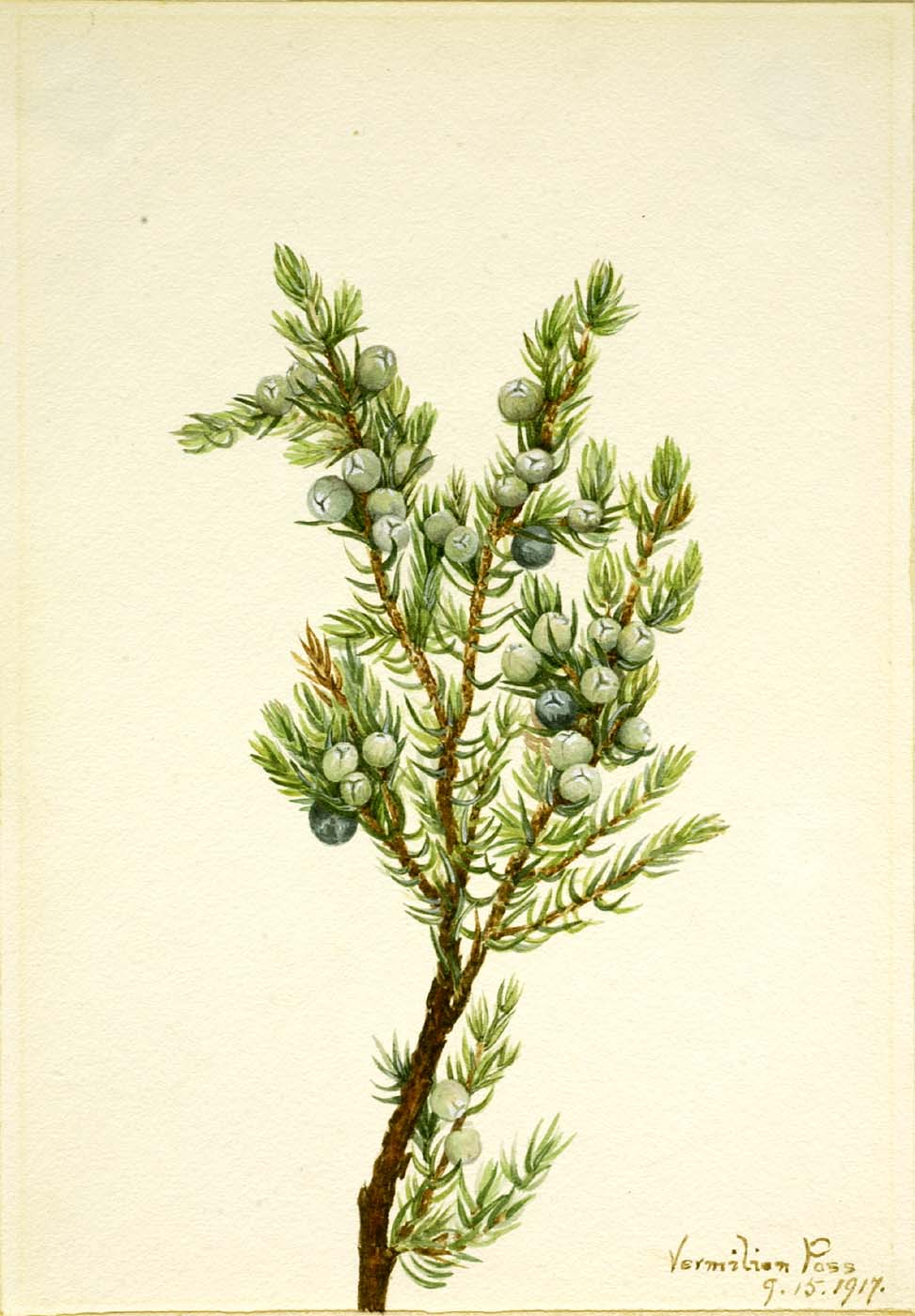
- Mountain Juniper by Mary Vaux Walcott, 1917.
- Gender: Unisex

Other names
- Related names: Guinevere, Geneva, Ginevra, Ginerpo, Junipero

Juniper is a given name used either in reference to the English common name for the juniper tree or berry, or in reference to a derivation of the Welsh name Guinevere. Juniper has historically been used as both a boys' name and a girls' name.

In 2011, Juniper entered the top 1000 list of given names in the United States for the first time and is quickly becoming a popular girls' name likely due to the popularity of a wide assortment of well-known fictional works, including the cartoon series The Life and Times of Juniper Lee, the movie Benny & Joon (where the Joon character was short for Juniper), Pamela Dean's novel Juniper, Gentian, and Rosemary, and the Donovan song, "Jennifer Juniper".

The juniper tree's name is derived from the Latin word juniperus. In Latin, juniperus is combination of the word junio, which means young, and parere, to produce, hence youth producing, or evergreen. Ginepro (Italian for Juniper), Ginevra (Italian variant form of Juniper), and Ginny are other names that also refer to the juniper tree.

Juniper is used to flavour the alcoholic spirit gin. The traditional drink jenever and its French name genièvre are names for juniper. The French name was shortened to geneva, sounding the same as the place name, and further abbreviated to 'gin'.

Another name which was originally unrelated is the British name Guinevere (Guenièvre in French), a variant Old French spelling of Gwenhwyfar, which in Welsh is a combination of the word gwen (mod. gwyn) which means "white" or "fair" and hwyfar which means a "spirit" or "fairy". This is also the origin of Jennifer, another name that sounds similar to Juniper. Because the Latin Juniperus family of names are the same or very similar-sounding to the Welsh Guinevere family of names, it is very difficult to determine, for names that begin with gin-, jen-, or jun-, which family they ultimately originated with.

== Common nicknames of Juniper ==
- Pepper or other diminutives based on the last syllable
- June or other diminutives based on the initial syllable
- Ginny: The name for the spirit gin is an English derivation of the Dutch word for Juniper: genever. This nickname is either in reference to gin, or similarly, when something is said to taste like juniper berries, it is said to be "ginny" tasting.
- Jenny: More so in England, where in some places it is pronounced "jenny-per"
- Nip or Nipper: While the origin of the usage of "nip" to refer to a drink or a glass of an alcoholic beverage actually comes from the rare term nipperkin [small measure], a folk etymology has that it originally referred to a nip of gin, with the "nip" being a shortening of juniper.

== Symbolism of the name Juniper ==
Ginevra de' Benci
- Artist: Leonardo da Vinci
- Year: circa 1476
- Type: oil on wood
- Dimensions: 38.8 cm × 36.7 cm (15.3 in × 14.4 in)
- Location: National Gallery of Art, Washington, D.C.

- Succor: In the Bible's Old Testament, a juniper tree with an angelic presence sheltered the prophet Elijah from Queen Jezebel's pursuit. Similarly, a later 6th century non-canonical apocryphal account tells of how the infant Jesus and his parents were hidden from King Herod's soldiers by a juniper during their flight into Egypt.
- During the Renaissance, the juniper was frequently used in art to represent chastity. For example, in Leonardo da Vinci's portrait of Ginevra de' Benci, a juniper tree is seen directly behind her (a visual pun, as the Italian word for juniper is ginepro, which is similar to Ginevra's name while alluding to her chastity). The reverse of the portrait is decorated with a juniper sprig encircled by a wreath of laurel and palm and is memorialized by the phrase VIRTUTEM FORMA DECORAT ("Beauty adorns Virtue").
- Saint Juniper, "the jester of the Lord" is sometimes called the saint of comedy. He was also known for his patience—it is said that St. Francis once described the perfect friar by citing "the patience of Brother Juniper, who attained the state of perfect patience because he kept the truth of his low estate constantly in mind, whose supreme desire was to follow Christ on the way of the cross." St. Frances held Juniper in such high regard he once said, "Would to God, my brothers, I had a whole forest of such Junipers."
- In many parts of Europe, juniper branches were smoldered and carried around fields to protect livestock and a female spirit of the juniper tree, called Frau Wachholder was invoked to make thieves return the goods they had stolen.
- In ancient Wales, the juniper tree was sacred and it was believed that cutting one down would result in the woodcutter's death the following year.
- The Eastern Redcedar (Juniperus virginiana) is used to make wooden pencils and is the "cedar" used in moth-repelling cedar chests and drawers.
- The juniper berry is used as a distinct flavoring for a wide variety of dishes and beverages.
- One Brothers Grimm fairy tale is "The Juniper Tree". In the story a mother is buried under a juniper tree, magically becomes part of the tree and a bird that was hatched in the tree, and avenges the death of her son when the bird drops a millstone and kills her son's stepmother.

== Notable people ==
- Juniper (friar) (died 1258), one of the original followers of Saint Francis of Assisi
- Juniper Shuey (born 1974), American visual artist
- Juniper Sage, pen name of Margaret Wise Brown, American author

== Fictional characters ==
- Brother Juniper, main character in Thornton Wilder's Pulitzer Prize-winning 1927 novel The Bridge of San Luis Rey and its film versions
- The title character of the Junie B. Jones children's books (Juniper Beatrice Jones)
- A title character of Juniper, Gentian, and Rosemary, a 1998 fantasy novel by Pamela Dean
- Juniper, title character of the book of the same name by Monica Furlong
- Juniper, Grover Underwood's girlfriend in Percy Jackson & the Olympians
- Brother Juniper (comics), title character of a syndicated comic strip that ran from 1958 to 1989 by Fred McCarthy
- Juniper Blossom, Polly Cooper's daughter in TV series Riverdale
- Juniper Lee, the title character in the cartoon series The Life and Times of Juniper Lee
- Juniper (Joon) Pearl, a title character from the 1993 movie Benny & Joon
- Lead character in the 2012 movie Mud, played by Reese Witherspoon
- Juniper, a female Pachyrhinosaurus in the 2013 film Walking with Dinosaurs
- Professor Juniper, in the Pokémon Black and White and Pokémon Black 2 and White 2 Nintendo DS video games
- Juniper Woods, from the 2013 game Phoenix Wright: Ace Attorney: Dual Destinies
- Juniper Green, in the 1920s Catherine Chisholm Cushing musical Lassie
- Juniper "June" Hayward, the main character in the book Yellowface by R F. Kuang
- James Juniper Eastwood, female lead character in The Once and Future Witches, 2020 novel by Alix. E Harrow
- Ghostbow Juniper, a character from the 2022 game Xenoblade Chronicles 3
- Juniper, from the 2024 game Fields of Mistria

== See also ==
- Junípero Serra (1713–1784), Spanish Franciscan friar
