= Caroline Stevermer =

American writer

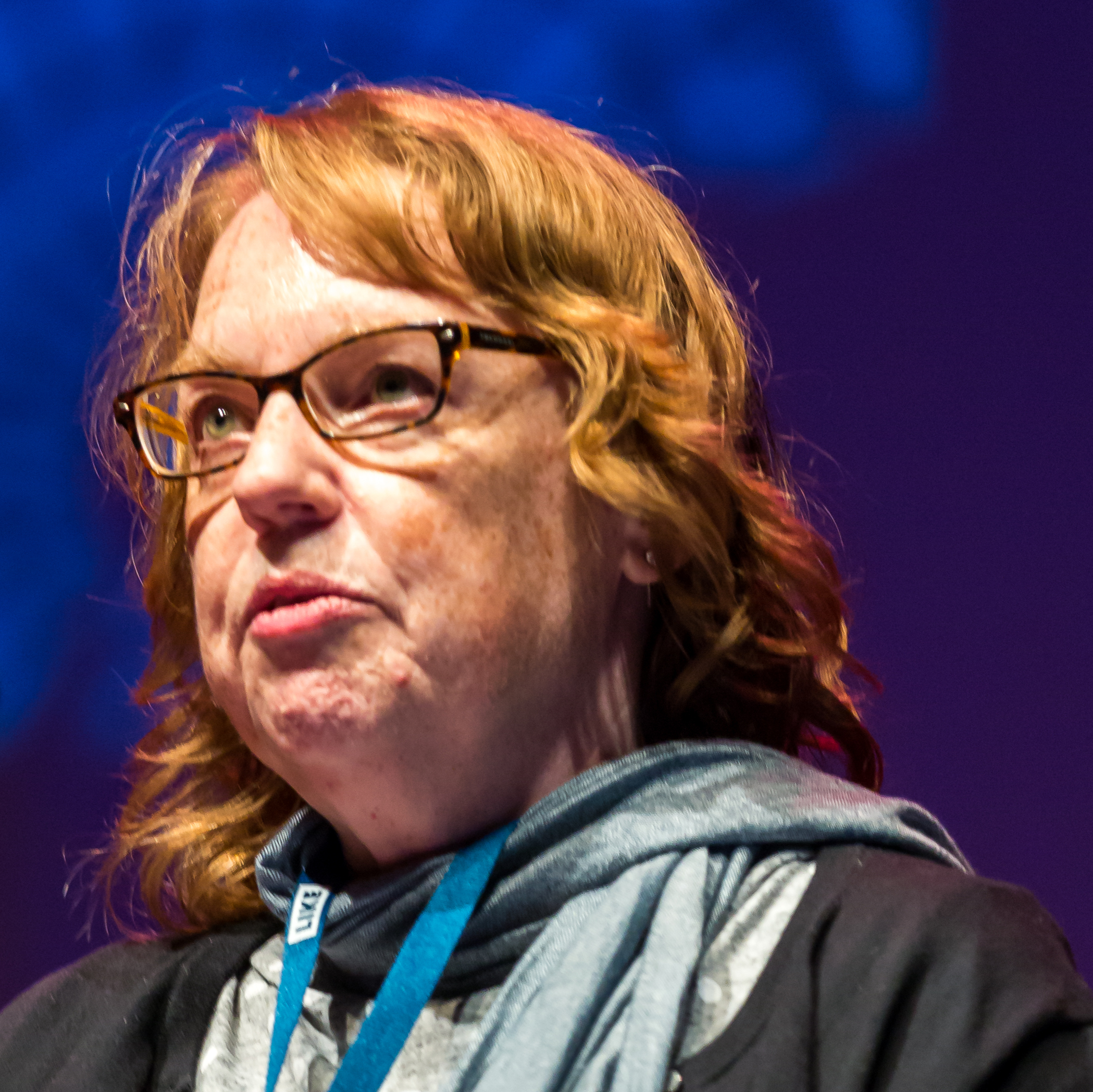
- Caroline Stevermer, Worldcon 2017.
- Born: 1955 (age 70–71)
- Citizenship: American
- Education: Bryn Mawr College (BA)
- Occupation: Writer
- Writing career
- Language: English
- Period: 1980–present
- Genres: Young adult, Speculative fiction, Fantasy, Historical fiction, Bildungsroman
- Website: members.authorsguild.net/carolinestev/

Caroline Stevermer (born 1955) is an American writer of young adult fantasy novels and shorter works. She is best known for historical fantasy novels.

== Personal life ==
Caroline Stevermer was born in 1955, and grew up on a dairy farm in Minnesota along with one sister and two brothers. She wanted to be a writer at age 8. She obtained her B.A. degree in the history of art from Bryn Mawr College in Pennsylvania. Her first two books were published under the name C. J. Stevermer. Her first novel written as Caroline Stevermer was The Serpent's Egg. She currently lives in Minnesota.

In 2008, she donated her archive to the department of Rare Books and Special Collections at Northern Illinois University.

== Works ==
=== Series ===
==== Nicholas Coffin ====
These were her first professional sales and were published by Ace under the name C. J. Stevermer. These feature an English alchemist in Rome at the time of the House of Borgia.

- The Alchemist: Death of a Borgia (1980)
- The Duke and the Veil (1981)

==== Cecelia and Kate ====
With Patricia C. Wrede, Stevermer wrote three novels set in an alternate Regency England where magic exists. The authors tell these stories from the first-person perspectives of cousins Kate and Cecelia (and, in the third book, two additional characters), who recount their adventures in magic and polite society. The first book is an epistolary novel. Unusually, it was written by the two authors exchanging letters with each other for the alternating sections, but never discussing the plot (the "Letter Game").

- Sorcery and Cecelia or The Enchanted Chocolate Pot: Being the Correspondence of Two Young Ladies of Quality Regarding Various Magical Scandals in London and the Country (1988, reprinted 2003)
- The Grand Tour or The Purloined Coronation Regalia: Being a Revelation of Matters of High Confidentiality and Greatest Importance, Including Extracts from the Intimate Diary of a Noblewoman and the Sworn Testimony of a Lady of Quality (2004)
- The Mislaid Magician or Ten Years After: Being the Private Correspondence Between Two Prominent Families Regarding a Scandal Touching the Highest Levels of Government and the Security of the Realm (2006).
- Magic Below Stairs (2010) was written by Caroline Stevermer alone, and is set in the same universe after The Grand Tour but before The Mislaid Magician. It follows the character Frederick Lincoln as a child in the house of the Schofields.

- The first two books in this series (Sorcery and Cecelia and The Grand Tour) were published in an omnibus edition, Magicians of Quality in 2005.

==== A College of Magics ====
Her Galazon series comprise a Ruritanian romance series with magic. Caroline Stevermer attended Bryn Mawr College, and Greenlaw, the College in A College of Magics, may be based on her experiences there. Terri Windling selected College as one of the best fantasy books of 1994, describing it as "charmingly distinctive . . . [marked by] the sly wit and sparkling prose that have earned her a cult following".

- A College of Magics (1994), received a Minnesota Book Award
- A Scholar of Magics (2004), a semi-sequel
- When the King Comes Home (2000), a medieval prequel.

- The first two books of this series (A College of Magics and A Scholar of Magics) were published as an omnibus edition, Scholarly Magics (2004, reprinted 2008). This was the Science Fiction Book Club's featured alternate selection for Spring 2004.

=== Stand-alone works ===
- River Rats (1992, reprinted 2005), a Minnesota Book Awards finalist, is a post-apocalyptic adventure novel on the Mississippi River with echoes of Mark Twain. This book is an ALA Best Book for Young Adults and received the Golden Duck Award and Golden Kite Award.
- The Serpent's Egg (1998), is a fantasy. It was her first novel written as Caroline Stevermer.
- The Glass Magician (2020), is a historical fantasy whose ending implies further works.

=== Anthology appearances ===
- All Hallows' Eve: Tales of Love and the Supernatural (1992), edited by Mary Elizabeth Allen ("Waiting for Harry"
- Snow White, Blood Red(1993), edited by Ellen Datlow and Terri Windling, containing retellings of fairy tales. ("The Springfield Swans" with Ryan Edmonds)
- The Armless Maiden and Other Tales for Childhood's Survivors (1995), edited by Terri Windling. (O"Watching the Bobolinks")
- The Essential Bordertown in the Borderland shared universe series (1998), edited by Terri Windling and Delia Sherman. ("Rag")
- The Coyote Road: Trickster Tales (2007), edited by Ellen Datlow and Terri Windling ("Uncle Bob Visits")
- Willful Impropriety: 13 Tales of Society, Scandal and Romance (2012), edited by Ekaterina Sedia themed around historical romance. ("The Language of Flowers"_
- Queen Victoria's Book of Spells: An Anthology of Gaslamp Fantasy (2013), editors Ellen Datlow and Terri Windling, themed around 19th century gaslamp reomance. ("The Vital Importance of the Superficial" with Ellen Kushner)
- The Mammoth Book of Gaslit Romances (Mammoth Romances) (2014), ediedd by Ekaterina Sedia. ("Waiting for Harry")
- Liavek 6: Wizard's Row (2016), edited by Will Shetterly and Emma Bull and part of the Liavek shared universe. ("Cenedwine Brocade")

==== List of short stories ====
- "Waiting for Harry" found in All Hallows' Eve: Tales of Love and the Supernatural (1992) and The Mammoth Book of Gaslit Romances (2014)
- "The Springfield Swans" with Ryan Edmonds found in Snow White, Blood Red (1993)
- "Rag" found in The Essential Bordertown (1998)
- "Uncle Bob Visits" found in The Coyote Road: Trickster Tales (Mythic Fiction # 3) (2007)
- "The Language of Flowers" found in Willful Impropriety: 13 Tales of Society, Scandal and Romance (2012)
- "The Vital Importance of the Superficial" with Ellen Kushner found in Queen Victoria's Book of Spells: An Anthology of Gaslamp Fantasy (2013)
- "Cenedwine Brocade" found in Liavek 6: Wizard's Row (2016)

=== Essays ===
- "Afterword" in Sorcery and Cecelia (1988) with Patrica C. Wrede
- "Watching the Bobolinks" found in The Armless Maiden and Other Tales for Childhood's Survivors (1995)

=== Reviews ===
- "Review: A Scholar of Magics" in Amazing Stories, September 2004, editor Dave Gross. With John C. Bunnell
- "Reviews: Books" in Amazing Stories, September 2004, editor Dave Gross. With Dorman T. Shindler, John Gregory Betancourt, Rob Lightner, Paul Hughes, John Pelan, Shelly Baur, Wolfgang Baur, Therese Littleton, and John C. Bunnell

=== Shared universes ===
She has participated in:

- Terri Windling's Borderlands shared universe
- The Liavek shared universe.
