= Steel Rose =

Steel Rose may refer to:

- Steel Rose (novel), a 1997 fantasy novel by the American writer Kara Dalkey
- Steel Rose (manhua), a Taiwanese comic
- China women's national football team
