= PJF =

PJF may stand for:

- Policía Judicial Federal, the former federal police force of Mexico
- Pre-Joycean Fellowship
- Philip José Farmer (1918–2009), American science fiction and fantasy author
- Philip J. Fry, the protagonist in the animated television series Futurama
- WPJF, AM radio station in Greenville, South Carolina
