= Borderland (novel series) =

Book series by Terri Windling

The Borderland series of urban fantasy novels and stories were created for teenage readers by author Terri Windling. Most of the series is set in Bordertown, a dystopian city near the border between "the Elflands" and "The World". The series consists of five anthologies and three novels. The series has spawned fan groups, gaming groups, costumed events (such as the Borderzone parties in Los Angeles), and was discussed in The Fence and the River: Culture and Politics at the US-Mexico Border by Claire F. Fox.

Bordertown is the name of the shared universe created by Terri Windling, and a fictional place within that universe. The premise of the Borderland books is that the "Elflands" - a realm of magic populated by post-Tolkien elves have "returned" to "The World". The region of juxtaposition of the Elflands and the World includes Bordertown or "B-Town", and the "Borderlands" which lie between Bordertown and the World. In the liminal environment of Bordertown and its environs, neither magic nor technology functions "normally", and unpredictable combinations of the two may emerge.

The geographic location of Bordertown in relation to our world is unspecified, although it usually seems to be within North America. Like New York City, Bordertown has a neighborhood named "Soho"; Bordertown's Soho is a largely depopulated part of the city given over to youth from both the World and the Elflands. Some have run away to Bordertown; others have run from something. The stories set in Soho often combine urban fantasy of various forms with a vaguely post-apocalyptic atmosphere.

The Borderlands series, created for teenage readers, focuses primarily but not exclusively on the disenfranchised youth culture of Bordertown, as manifest in gang violence, race relations, and miscegenation, impromptu forms of social organization, class conflict, generation gaps, and literary criticism. The music of the 1980s is a significant influence.

== The Bordertown Series ==
- Borderland, edited by Terri Windling and Mark Alan Arnold (1986)
  - Farrel Din: "Introduction"
  - Steven R. Boyett: "Prodigy"
  - Bellamy Bach: "Gray"
  - Charles de Lint: "Stick"
  - Ellen Kushner: "Charis"
- Bordertown, edited by Terri Windling and Mark Alan Arnold (1986)
  - Farrel Din: "Introduction"
  - Emma Bull & Will Shetterly: "Danceland"
  - Midori Snyder: "Demon"
  - Bellamy Bach: "Exile"
  - Ellen Kushner & Bellamy Bach: "Mockery"
- Life on the Border, edited by Terri Windling (1991)
  - Will Shetterly: "Nevernever"
  - Ellen Kushner: "Lost in the Mail" (II)
  - Kara Dalkey: "Nightwail"
  - Ellen Kushner: "Lost in the Mail" (III)
  - Midori Snyder: "Alison Gross"
  - Ellen Kushner: "Lost in the Mail" (IV)
  - Charles de Lint: "Berlin"
  - Ellen Kushner: "Lost in the Mail" (V)
  - Michael Korolenko: "Reynardine"
  - Ellen Kushner: "Lost in the Mail" (VI)
  - Craig Shaw Gardner: "Light and Shadow"
  - Ellen Kushner: "Lost in the Mail" (VII)
  - Bellamy Bach: "Rain and Thunder"
  - Emma Bull: "For It All" (lyrics)
  - Ellen Kushner: "Lost in the Mail" (VIII-IX)
- The Essential Bordertown: A Traveller's Guide to the Edge of Faerie, edited by Terri Windling and Delia Sherman (1998)
  - Terri Windling: "Introduction"
  - Terri Windling: "How to Get There #1: From the World to the Border"
  - Patricia A. McKillip: "Oak Hill"
  - Terri Windling: "How to Get There #2: The Path from the True and Only Realm to the False Lands and The City of Illusion (Translation for Humans: How to Get from Elfland to Bordertown)"
  - Midori Snyder: "Dragon Child"
  - Terri Windling: "First Things First: So You Need a Place to Stay"
  - Delia Sherman: "Socks"
  - Terri Windling: "The Gangs: And Life's Other Little Annoyances"
  - Donnard Sturgis: "Half Life"
  - Terri Windling and Teresa Nielsen Hayden: "What to Eat: A Tasteful Guide to Border Cuisine"
  - Ellen Kushner: "Hot Water: A Bordertown Romance"
  - Terri Windling and Teresa Nielsen Hayden: "The Music Scene: What's Up and What Ain't"
  - Michael Korolenko: "Arcadia"
  - Terri Windling: "Nightlife: Where to Find It"
  - Elisabeth Kushner: "Changeling"
  - Terri Windling: "So You Want to Be a Star: Get Real"
  - Charles de Lint: "May This Be Your Last Sorrow"
  - Terri Windling: "Uptown: How the Other Half Lives"
  - Caroline Stevermer: "Rag"
  - Terri Windling and Teresa Nielsen Hayden: "The Peculiar Joy of Cooking on the Border"
  - Steven Brust: "When the Bow Breaks"
  - Terri Windling and Mimi Panitch: "Culture Clash #1: A Human Guide to Elvin Etiquette"
  - Ellen Steiber: "Argentine"
  - Terri Windling: "Culture Clash #2: A Trueblood Guide to Human Peccadillos"
  - Micole Sudberg: "Cover Up My Tracks with Rain"
  - Terri Windling: "Famous Last Words"
  - Felicity Savage: "How Shannaro Tolkinson Lost and Found His Heart"
- Welcome to Bordertown, edited by Holly Black and Ellen Kushner (2011)
  - Holly Black: "Introduction"
  - Terri Windling: "Introduction"
  - "Bordertown Basics"
  - Ellen Kushner and Terri Windling: "Welcome to Bordertown"
  - Cory Doctorow: "Shannon's Law"
  - Patricia A. McKillip: "Cruel Sister"
  - Catherynne M. Valente: "A Voice Like a Hole"
  - Amal El-Mohtar: "Stairs in Her Hair"
  - Emma Bull: "Incunabulum"
  - Steven Brust: "Run Back Across the Border"
  - Alaya Dawn Johnson: "A Prince of Thirteen Days"
  - Will Shetterly: "The Sages of Elsewhere"
  - Jane Yolen: "Soulja Grrrl: A Long Line Rap"
  - Janni Lee Simner: "Crossings"
  - Sara Ryan (Writer) and Dylan Meconis (Illustrator): "Fair Trade"
  - Jane Yolen: "Night Song for a Halfie"
  - Tim Pratt: "Our Stars, Our Selves"
  - Annette Curtis Klause: "Elf Blood"
  - Nalo Hopkinson: "Ours Is the Prettiest"
  - Delia Sherman: "The Wall"
  - Christopher Barzak: "We Do Not Come in Peace"
  - Jane Yolen: "A Borderland Jump-Rope Rhyme"
  - Holly Black and Cassandra Clare: "The Rowan Gentleman"
  - Neil Gaiman: "The Song of the Song"
  - Charles de Lint: "A Tangle of Green Men"

== Novels ==
- Elsewhere, Will Shetterly (1991)
- Nevernever, Will Shetterly (1993)
- Finder, Emma Bull (1994)

== Reception ==
W. Peter Miller reviewed Borderland for Different Worlds magazine and stated that "The Chronicles of the Borderlands are heartily recommended to anyone interested in spicing up a fantasy campaign, or those searching for somewhere new, different, and refreshing to set a role-playing campaign."

== Reviews ==
Borderland:

- Review by Faren Miller (1986) in Locus, #304 May 1986

Bordertown:

- Review by Constance Ash (1986) in Fantasy Review, November 1986
- Review by John C. Bunnell (1987) in Dragon Magazine, March 1987
- Review by Charles de Lint (1987) in Short Form, Winter 1987
