= The Scribblies =

American fantasy fiction writing group

The Scribblies were a fantasy fiction group of writers formed in the U.S. city of Minneapolis in January 1980. Members included Nate Bucklin, Emma Bull, Steven Brust, Kara Dalkey, Pamela Dean, Will Shetterly and Patricia Wrede. At the time, they shared the same editor and literary agent.

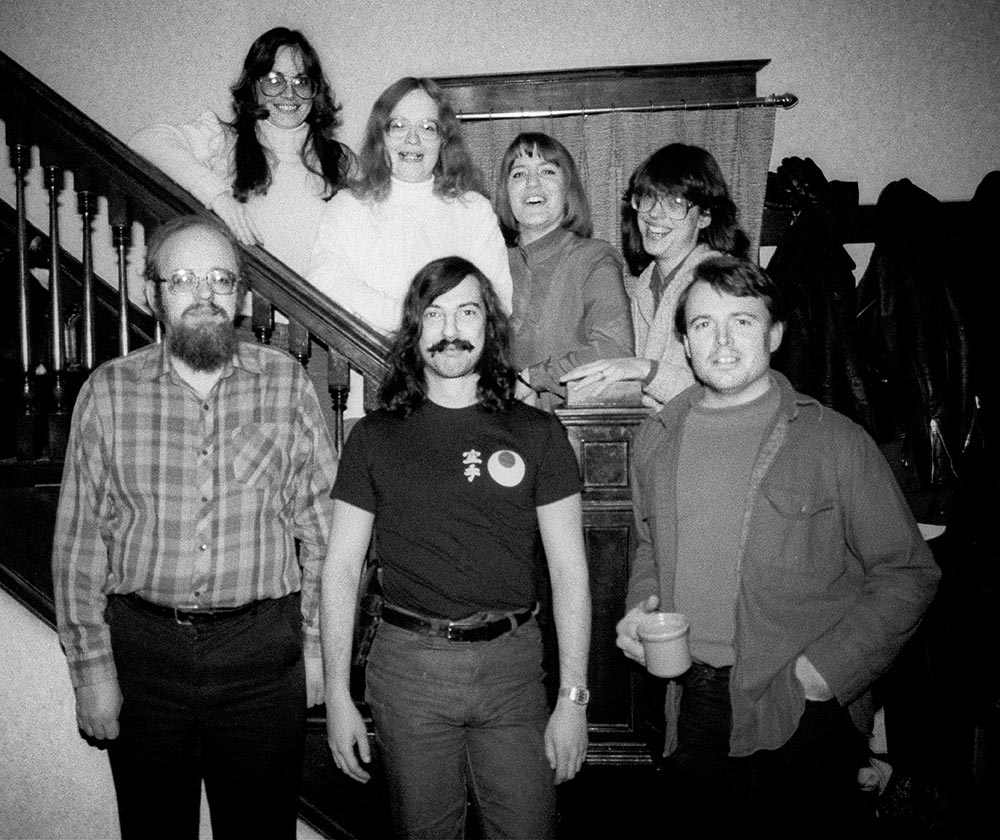
The Scribblies (Minneapolis writer's group) in 1985

These authors all contributed short stories to the Liavek anthologies. Liavek was a shared-world series edited by Emma Bull and Will Shetterly.

The name "Scribblies" is a joke inspired by the Industrial Workers of the World, "the Wobblies". It also derives from Prince William Henry, Duke of Gloucester and Edinburgh's comment to Edward Gibbon upon receiving the second (or third, or possibly both) volume(s) of Gibbon's The History of the Decline and Fall of the Roman Empire "Another damned thick book! Always scribble, scribble, scribble! Eh, Mr. Gibbon?"
