= Pre-Joycean Fellowship =

Collective identification of some writers

The Pre-Joycean Fellowship, abbreviated PJF, is a collective identification that was semi-seriously adopted by several writers known for fantasy and science fiction, to indicate that they value 19th-century values of storytelling. An example of such values is clarity, which was called by Jane Yolen the "lovely limpid quality" of writing.

Steven Brust wrote that "it is in large part a joke, and in another large part a way to start literary arguments."

The term was probably coined by Will Shetterly, and was adopted in imitation of the Pre-Raphaelite Brotherhood, positing James Joyce as the dividing line (in English) between 19th-century fiction intended for a general audience and a modern desire to write for readers who are well educated in literary history. Writer Tappan King is credited with the comment, "The Pre-Joycean Fellowship exists to poke fun at the excesses of contemporary literature while simultaneously mining it for everything of value."

The name was meant as a joke; a "gathering of the PJF" was an excuse for writers with shared interests to meet at a bar. Steven Brust took the joke public when he began signing "PJF" after his name on his title pages.

Members have included:

- Steven Brust
- Emma Bull
- Pamela Dean
- Kara Dalkey
- Neil Gaiman
- Will Shetterly
- Adam Stemple
- Jane Yolen

On page 2 of issue #31 of Vertigo Comics' The Sandman, the comic's author is identified as "Neil Gaiman, P.J.F." in the credits box. This credits box was not included in at least some editions when the issue was reprinted as part of The Sandman, Volume VI: Fables & Reflections.
