= Bone Dance =

1991 fantasy novel by Emma Bull

- First paperback edition
- Author: Emma Bull
- Cover artist: Jean Targete
- Language: English
- Genre: Fantasy, science fiction
- Publisher: Ace Books
- Publication date: May 1991
- Publication place: United States
- Media type: Print (paperback)
- Pages: 278 pp (first edition, paperbound)
- ISBN: 0-441-57457-2
- OCLC: 23612899

Bone Dance is a 1991 novel by American writer Emma Bull, described variously as fantasy, hard science fiction and cyberpunk. It was nominated for the Hugo, Nebula and World Fantasy Awards in 1992.

== Setting ==
Although the city in which Bone Dance is set is not named, it appears to be a climate-modified Minneapolis, the author's setting for her first novel, War for the Oaks. The novel features references to Tarot (each of ten sections is named for a card) and Louisiana Voodoo. It is subtitled "A Fantasy for Technophiles" and the central place of devices generally, and electronics specifically, justifies that label. Since the time is a post-nuclear-clash future following a war between the Americas, North and South, skill at maintaining and repairing salvaged artifacts is valuable. So are pre-collapse artifacts themselves. Sparrow, the point-of-view character, makes a living by bartering such skill, along with occasional sales of scavenged artifacts. Sparrow is a bioengineered human, though that case is not plainly stated until half-way through the story.

== Plot summary ==
In a brief opening scene, Sparrow sells a rare videotape to a wealthy collector. In the scene that follows, we suddenly find Sparrow waking in a confusing place with new injuries and no memory of the preceding 36 hours. On the way to enlightenment we meet many of Sparrow's friends and experience the Night Market, a large section of the city only open during darkness, ruled by "The Deal": everything is transactional. After a cryptic Tarot reading from friend Sherrea, abduction by a dead man animated by what might as well be a Loa, and introduction to a Vodun-based community that is dedicated to replacing, by coup if necessary, the status quo in the city. That includes the man most responsible for the inter-continental war, now at the city's power apex, a character who is also the revenge target of another survivor from his kind. Those are the "Horsemen", modified people who can move their consciousness from body to body.

The second half of the story shows Sparrow's awkward progress toward a fully human condition and becoming a valued member of a community, and is capped by a closing conceit: that the whole telling has been an autobiography.

== Reception ==
Bone Dance is regarded by scholars as defying genre and gender conventions: its setting blends fantasy with hard science fiction, while its protagonist blurs gender boundaries. Academic Veronica Hollinger termed the book "a feminist revision of 1980s cyberpunk", noting that its hard-boiled tone shared similarities to William Gibson's Neuromancer. The novel employs cyberpunk motifs such as mind control and genetic engineering to explore themes of gender identity. The construction of Sparrow's self-identity was described by academic Jane Donawerth as reminiscent of Mary Shelley's Frankenstein.

Bone Dance was nominated for numerous awards, including the Hugo, Locus, Nebula and World Fantasy Awards, and received a special citation at the Philip K. Dick Award.

== Sources ==
- Booker, M. Keith; Thomas, Anne-Marie (2009). The Science Fiction Handbook. Wiley-Blackwell. ISBN 978-1-4443-1035-1.
- Donawerth, Jane (1997). Frankenstein's Daughters. Syracuse University Press. ISBN 978-0-8156-2686-2.
- Hollinger, Veronica (2003). "Feminist Theory and Science Fiction". In James, Edward; Mendlesohn, Farah (eds.). The Cambridge Companion to Science Fiction. Cambridge University Press. ISBN 978-0-521-01657-5.
- Wolmark, Jenny (1999). "The Postmodern Romances of Feminist Science Fiction". Cybersexualities. Edinburgh University Press. ISBN 978-0-7486-1118-8.
