= Finder (novel) =

1994 fantasy novel by Emma Bull

- First hardbound edition cover
- Author: Emma Bull
- Cover artist: Richard Bober
- Language: English
- Series: Borderlands
- Genre: Fantasy novel
- Publisher: Tor
- Publication date: February 1994
- Publication place: United States
- Media type: Print (hardbound & paperback)
- Pages: 317 (first edition, hardbound)
- ISBN: 0-312-85418-8 (ISBN 0-312-86291-1 pb)
- OCLC: 29357097
- Dewey Decimal: 813/.54 20
- LC Class: PS3552.U423 F56 1994

Finder is a fantasy novel written by Emma Bull and published in 1994.

== Setting ==
The Borderlands setting of Finder is the collaborative creation of several authors, including Will Shetterley—Emma Bull's husband. It posits the abrupt intrusion of Elfland, a walled territory of unspecified extent, into the everyday World. Erratic leakage of magical effects across its edge has left an abandoned zone, The Borderlands, including at least one abandoned settlement: Bordertown. Though not so large a place as Minneapolis, where the author's War for the Oaks is set, this context puts Finder into the urban fantasy category. Bordertown is populated by misfits from both World and Elfland, living in a near-anarchy that includes volunteer collectives running restaurants, grouchy artisans making paper, and assorted artists making odd adornments, all sympathetically described.

== Characters and plot summary ==
The main point-of-view character has renamed himself 'Orient', in the sense of 'align directions', on arrival in Bordertown. He is nicknamed "Finder" for his magical gift that lets him—or compels him to—locate things and people. His working partner is Tick-Tick, an elf woman whose gift for making and fixing technical things was as disturbing to her parents as Orient's talent was to his. A mysterious death opens the plot, making it something of a murder mystery as well as fantasy, and Orient's collaboration with volunteer cop Sunny Rico and her working partner Linn, also an elf, adds a police procedural element. Romance creeps in as Orient and Sunny cope with the plot's sequence of disasters.

The opening death appears to be related to distribution of a new drug, of which the target demographic is humans who want to be elves: it physically changes them. However, when both Tick-Tick and Linn fall ill along with many of the elvish residents of Bordertown, the drug-affected humans are understood to be carriers for a virulent mutation of a rare disease of elves. Discovery of just who has let this plague loose and with what motivation takes the plot to its close.

== Reception ==
Terri Windling characterized Finder as "a mature and emotionally rich mystery novel . . . witty, stylish, and ultimately moving."
