= Bellamy Bach =

Bellamy Bach was a group pseudonym used by several New York-based writers in the 1980s, some of whom still remain anonymous. Terri Windling has used the pseudonym when writing stories for the anthologies Bordertown and Life on the Border, which were part of the Borderland series of urban fantasy stories and novels for teenage readers.

Other poetry and short fiction appeared under the "Bellamy Bach" name in other fantasy anthologies (including the Elsewhere series) and 'zines (including The Green Man). Windling has said these were not her work, but created by other members of the group.
