= Tam Lin (novel) =

1991 novel by Pamela Dean

- First edition
- Author: Pamela Dean
- Cover artist: Thomas Canty
- Language: English
- Genre: Contemporary fantasy, urban fantasy and fantasy of manners
- Publisher: Tor Books
- Publication date: March 1991
- Publication place: United States
- Media type: Print (hardcover and paperback)
- Pages: 468
- ISBN: 0-312-85137-5
- OCLC: 22506452
- Dewey Decimal: 813/.54 20
- LC Class: PS3554.E1729 T36 1991

Tam Lin is a 1991 contemporary fantasy novel by United States author Pamela Dean, who based it on the traditional Scottish border ballad "Tam Lin".

== Plot introduction ==
The protagonist of Tam Lin is Janet Carter. Written in the indirect third person, from Carter's point of view, the novel is set during her years as a student in the early 1970s at the fictional Blackstock College in Minnesota. The characters include her fellow students, professors at the college, her family, and a childhood friend. The plot combines the story of a young woman's life at college with a retelling of the traditional Scottish fairy ballad "Tam Lin".

== Characters ==
- Janet Carter - The protagonist of the story and daughter of an English professor
- Molly DuBois - A college roommate.
- Christina - Another college roommate.
- Nicholas Tooley - A Classics major who dates Janet.
- Thomas Lane - The famous "Tam Lin" of the ballad.
- Robin Armin - A Classics major who is close with Nick.
- Professor Medeous - Head of the Classics Department.
- Melinda Wolfe - A Classics professor and Janet's first study adviser.
- Victoria Thompson - A campus ghost from the late 19th century.
- Danny Chin - Janet's friend from childhood.

== Major themes ==
Tam Lin is a late 20th-century urban fantasy or fantasy of manners. The story touches on themes including college education, sexuality, contraception, abortion and pregnancy. Dean has referred to this novel as a "love poem" to "my college, and ultimately to the study of English literature."

== References and allusions to other works ==
The novel Tam Lin is based on the traditional Scottish border ballad Tam Lin.

The novel also contains many quotations and allusions. Most of the quotations are from English literature and especially Shakespeare's plays, but there are also quotes from and allusions to other sources, including English folk songs. One chapter refers extensively to an in-story production of The Revenger's Tragedy. It refers to the poetic works of John Keats. The complete text of La Belle Dame Sans Merci is quoted by the novel's protagonist. Homer's Iliad is quoted and referenced by several characters, in the original ancient Greek and in English translations by George Chapman and Alexander Pope.

== References to history and geography ==
The novel alludes to several historical events and figures in early 1970s U.S. history, including the Vietnam War and Nixon. Carter mentions the US Supreme Court ruling allowing legal abortions in the U.S. (see Roe v. Wade).

Blackstock College is partially based on Carleton College, Northfield, Minnesota, which the author attended as an undergraduate (1971–1975). In the "Author's Note", Dean states:

Readers acquainted with Carleton College will find much that is familiar to them in the architecture, landscape, classes, terminology, and general atmosphere of Blackstock. They are earnestly advised that it would be unwise to refine too much upon this. Blackstock is not Carleton.

=== Historical figures as characters ===
In the novel, a key revelation is that two of the Classics majors, Robin and Nick, are in fact the same Robert Armin and Nicholas Tooley who performed with The King's Men during the time when William Shakespeare was writing plays for the troupe. The story even alludes to a theory that the historical Armin's singing ability influenced some of Shakespeare's plays (as it gave the Bard a new form to work with). It is implied that they had been mortals who had joined Medeous' faerie band in the early 17th century, which is why they are alive at Blackstock in the 1970s.

== Awards and nominations ==
- 1992, Mythopoeic Awards, Adult Fantasy category, finalist.

== Release details ==
- 1991, U.S., Tor Books (Tom Doherty Associates), ISBN 0-312-85137-5, ISBN 978-0-312-85137-8, March 1991, hardcover
- 1992, U.S., Tor Books (Tom Doherty Associates), St. Martin's Press, ISBN 0-8125-4450-1, ISBN 978-0-8125-4450-3, April 1992, paperback
- 2006, U.S., Firebird Books (Penguin Group), ISBN 0-14-240652-X, ISBN 978-0-14-240652-6, August 3, 2006, paperback
