= He Do the Time Police in Different Voices =

Book by David Langford

- Author: David Langford
- Genre: Parody
- Publisher: Wildside Press
- Publication date: 2003

He Do the Time Police in Different Voices is a collection of parodies and pastiches of the work of multiple authors of science fiction, fantasy, and detective fiction, all written by David Langford between 1976 and 2002 for various publications; the collection was published in 2003 by Wildside Press. The title is an homage to the originally proposed title of T. S. Eliot's groundbreaking poem, The Waste Land (itself named after a passage from Charles Dickens's Our Mutual Friend).

== Reception ==
Emerald City described HDTTPIDV's content as "devastating Langfordian parodies", while Analog Science Fiction and Fact called it "delightful" and "good clean fun," and Michael Bishop, writing in the New York Review of Science Fiction, stated that it was "hilarious", and "enthusiastically recommend(ed)" it.

== List of authors parodied in HDTTPIDV ==
- Piers Anthony
- Isaac Asimov
- Jorge Luis Borges
- Lewis Carroll
- G. K. Chesterton
- Agatha Christie
- Arthur Conan Doyle
- Harlan Ellison
- The Brothers Grimm
- Frank Herbert
- William Hope Hodgson
- H. P. Lovecraft
- Michael Moorcock
- Damon Runyon
- E. E. Smith
- Rex Stout
- A. E. van Vogt
- James White
