= Territory (novel) =

2007 fantasy-western novel by Emma Bull

- First hardbound edition cover
- Author: Emma Bull
- Cover artist: John Jude Palencar
- Language: English
- Genre: Fantasy novel Weird West
- Publisher: Tom Doherty Associates (Tor)
- Publication date: July 2007
- Publication place: United States
- Media type: Print Hardbound & Paperback
- Pages: 318 pp (first edition, hardbound)
- ISBN: 978-0-312-85735-6 (Hardbound); ISBN 978-0-7653-3019-2 (Paperback)

Territory is a fantasy western or Weird West novel by Emma Bull, published in 2007. It placed 4th in the 2008 Locus Poll Award for Best Fantasy Novel. It was also nominated for a World Fantasy Award in the Best Novel category.

== Plot ==
The territory is the vicinity of Tombstone, Arizona in 1881, but also refers to the magicians' power struggle. Most of the characters are named for historical individuals from the era; the aim is a tale that parallels recorded events, but places those in a context where magic is real.

The principal male character, Jesse Fox, is a horse trainer in the manner of John Solomon Rarey. He has professional qualifications, but no stomach to pursue them: he is drifting, uprooted by unease over the abilities that have led to his sister's demotion to madwoman status and his own share of such abilities. The principal female character is Mrs. Mildred Benjamin, widow of David Benjamin, supporting herself as a typesetter for one of the Tombstone newspapers but moonlighting as the freelance author of Wild West stories for a ladies' periodical. She has a slight supernatural talent of perception.

The plot has multiple black magicians as its villains, but avoids identifying just whose hat is blackest until the final showdown. A bungled stagecoach robbery that involved one of the four Earp brothers, Morgan, leads to much ado with misdirected posses and the deaths of all participants except for him. Along the way Jesse's Chinese buddy Chow Lung, another magician, but one who is comfortable in his powers, is also killed, to keep Jesse in Tombstone. Jesse helps fight a major fire in downtown Tombstone and has his injuries nursed by Mildred; Mildred's house burns and Jesse helps her defend the lot from the machinations of a mining outfit that lays claim to the whole neighborhood. Jesse escorts Mildred to a ball, where the pair witness the magical dimensions of an altercation between Wyatt Earp and Doc Holliday. By the closing pages Jesse has come to accept and is learning to manage his magical abilities, applying them to block Earp's deadly excesses in his efforts to defend and enlarge the well-being of his clan.
