= Tim Willocks =

British physician and novelist

Dr. Timothy Willocks
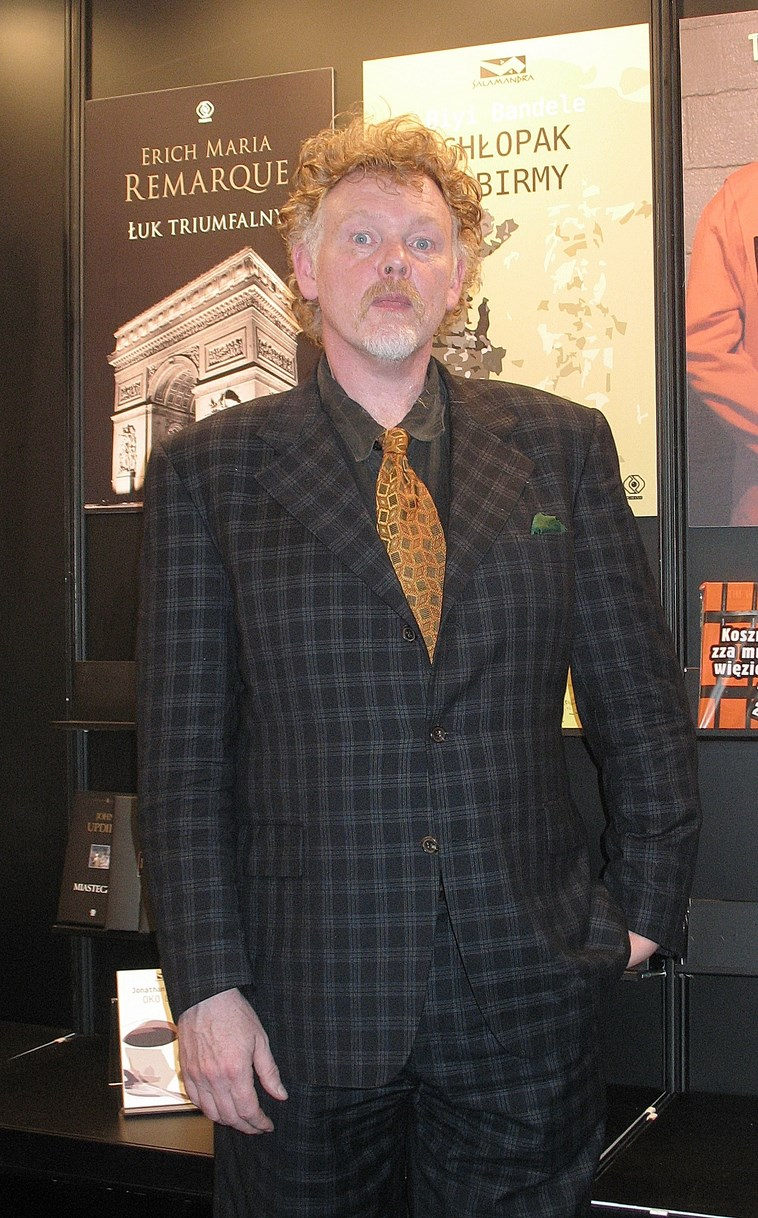
- Tim Willocks in Warsaw (2009)
- Born: Timothy Willocks; 27 October 1957 (age 68); Stalybridge, Cheshire, England
- Education: UCL Medical School
- Occupation: writer
- Website: www.timwillocks.com

Signature
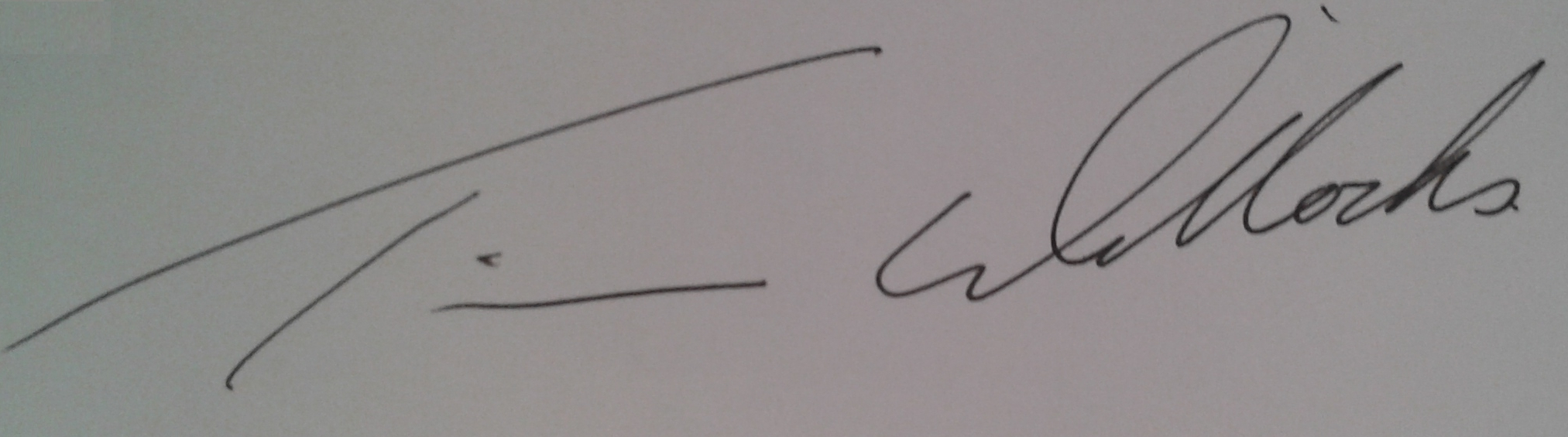

Tim Willocks is a British physician and novelist (Born 27 October 1957) in Stalybridge, Cheshire, England. Willocks studied medicine at the University College Hospital Medical School and has worked for some years on the rehabilitation of sufferers of drug addiction. Willocks holds a second dan black belt in Shotokan karate.

== Career ==
His 1991 novel Bad City Blues was adapted for the screen in 1999 in a movie starring Dennis Hopper. Willocks also wrote the Steven Spielberg documentary The Unfinished Journey.

Willocks wrote the screenplay for the film Swept from the Sea (1997) based on the 1903 novel Amy Foster by Joseph Conrad.

The novel The Religion (2006) is set in 1565 during the Grand Siege of Malta and is the first book of the Tannhauser Trilogy. The second part - Twelve Children of Paris - appeared in 2013.

== Published work ==
- Bad City Blues (1991)
- Green River Rising (1995) - follows the progress of a fictional prison riot from the perspective of a short stint inmate about to be paroled
- Bloodstained Kings (1996)
- Doglands (2011)
- Memo from Turner (2018)

=== Mattias Tannhauser trilogy ===
1. The Religion (2006)
2. Twelve Children of Paris (2013)
