= Dog Land (attraction) =

Tourist attraction near Chiefland, Florida

- Location: Chiefland, Florida
- Opened: 1960
- Closed: 1974
- Theme: Dogs
- Area: 8 acres (3.2 ha)

Dog Land was an eight-acre tourist attraction consisting entirely of different breeds of dog that was open from 1960 to 1974 near Chiefland, Florida. It was conceptualized by Bob Shetterly, Vincenzo Calvaresi, and C.J. Wade, head of the Lexington Kennel Club.

== History ==
Conceptualized in 1960, the goal of the attraction was to display each of all 113 different dog breeds then recognized by the American Kennel Club. To encourage dog breeders, owners, and other enthusiasts to invest, Dog Land's entrance had a sign in the shape of a dog. When questioned on location, Bob Shetterly said, “Up here in northwest Florida, under these big pines, it doesn’t get too hot for the Siberian husky, and neither is it too cold for the African basenji.” Shetterly ran the attraction and lived on-site with his family.

During its time, Dog Land was the world's largest collection of dog breeds from all over the world.

Dog Land shut down in 1974. It is unknown what happened to the many dogs living there.

== Response ==
Dog Land enjoyed great success, with over 100 dogs living on the premises within its first year, and was featured in a guided tour video of the area that showed off the comfortable housing that included a patio and a run for each dog. Visitors from all over the world stopped by to see and adopt dogs. One edition of National Geographic showed a Sikh man's experience at Dog Land, depicting the place as family friendly and educational. All dogs on display at the attraction were purebred and buying them could cost customers up to $2,500. The only mutt on the premises was labelled an American breed, "another name for mongrel," and was named Pirate.

Bob Shetterly's son, Will Shetterly, wrote a novel called Dogland based on his experiences growing up with the attraction. The park itself has been left to rust and grow over.

== Expansions ==
In 1965, a Kentucky Fried Chicken restaurant was integrated with Dog Land due to being so close to the entrance. There were plans for a dog hall of fame and a greyhound training track to be added on the property, but the attraction closed before these renovations could be made.
