= Steel Rose (novel) =

American fantasy novel by Kara Dalkey

- Author: Kara Dalkey
- Language: English
- Genre: Novel
- Publication date: 1997
- Publication place: United States
- Media type: Print
- ISBN: 0-451-45639-4
- OCLC: 38057266

Steel Rose is a fantasy novel by the American writer Kara Dalkey.

Set in 1990s Pittsburgh, Pennsylvania, it tells the story of T.J. Kaminski, a performance artist who is desperate to jumpstart her career. In a secret corner of Schenley Park, she conjures up elves with the power to grant her wish. But when Kaminski picks up the strange rose one of them tosses on stage, she unwittingly steps into a battle between immortal foes.
