= Pamela Dean =

American novelist (born 1953)

Pamela Dean Dyer-Bennet
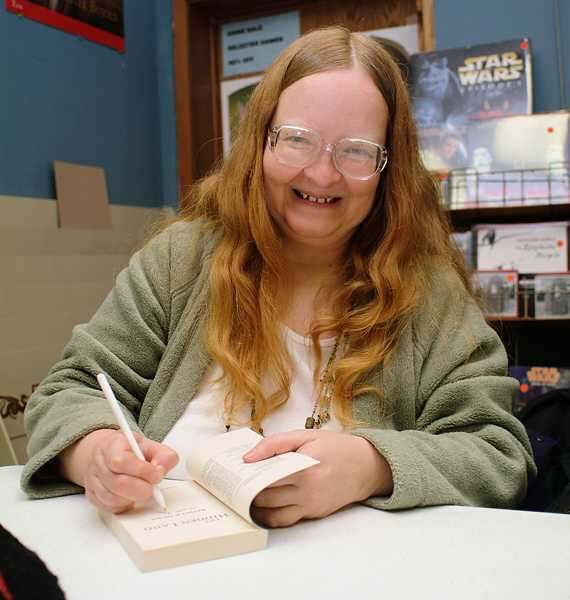
- Born: 1953 (age 72–73)
- Education: Carleton College
- Occupation: Author
- Writing career
- Pen name: Pamela Dean
- Genre: Fantasy
- Notable works: Tam Lin, The Secret Country trilogy
- Literary movement: Contemporary fantasy, urban fantasy and fantasy of manners
- Website: www.dd-b.net/pddb/

Pamela Collins Dean Dyer-Bennet (born 1953), better known as Pamela Dean, is an American fantasy author whose best-known book is Tam Lin, based on the Child Ballad of the same name, in which the Scottish fairy story is set on a midwestern college campus loosely based on her alma mater, Carleton College in Minnesota.

== Career ==
Dean has published six novels and a number of short stories. Tam Lin and The Dubious Hills were both nominated for the Mythopoeic Fantasy Award for Adult Literature, in 1992 and 1995 respectively.

She was a member of the writing group The Scribblies, along with Emma Bull, Will Shetterly, Kara Dalkey, Nate Bucklin, Patricia Wrede and Steven Brust, and was a contributor to the Liavek shared-world anthologies. She is a member of the Pre-Joycean Fellowship.

As of 2012, Dean reports that Going North, the future "joint sequel to The Dubious Hills and The Whim of the Dragon, has been rejected by Viking Press, leaving her to make further revisions and seek alternative methods for publication.

== Personal life ==
Dean graduated from Carleton College in 1975.

On 30 December 1982, she married fellow fan David Dyer-Bennet.

== Bibliography ==
=== Novels ===
- The Secret Country (1985, reissued in 2003)
- The Hidden Land (The Secret Country Trilogy, Vol. 2) (1986, reissued in 2003)
- The Whim of the Dragon (The Secret Country Trilogy, Vol. 3) (1989, reissued in 2003)
- Tam Lin (1991, reissued in 2006)
- The Dubious Hills (1994, reissued in 2007)
- Juniper, Gentian, and Rosemary (1998)

=== Short stories ===
- "The Green Cat" (1985), in Liavek anthology
- "Two Houses in Saltigos" (1986), in Liavek: The Players of Luck anthology
- "Paint the Meadows with Delight" (1987), in Liavek: Wizard's Row anthology
- "The Last Part of the Tragic History of Acrilat" (1988), in Liavek: Spells of Binding anthology
- "A Necessary End" (1990), in Liavek: Festival Week anthology
- "Juniper, Gentian and Rosemary" (1989), in Things That Go Bump In The Night anthology
- "Owlswater" (1993), in Xanadu anthology
- "This Fair Gift" (1996), in Sisters in Fantasy II anthology
- "Cousins" (2006), in Firebirds Rising anthology

=== Non-fiction ===
- "Read This" (1994), in The New York Review of Science Fiction, April 1994
