= The First Line (magazine) =

American literary magazine

- Type: Quarterly
- Format: Magazine
- Owner: Blue Cubicle Press
- Editor: David LaBounty
- Founded: 1999
- Headquarters: Plano, Texas
- Price: $12.00/ $20 subscription
- ISSN: 1525-9382
- Website: https://www.thefirstline.com/

The First Line (ISSN 1525-9382) is an American literary magazine founded in 1999 by David LaBounty, Robin LaBounty, and Jeff Adams. It is a quarterly journal based in Plano, Texas. The premise of the magazine is simple: each story begins with the same first line.

== History ==
When The First Line debuted, the magazine was six to eight sheets of 8 ½ inch by 14 inch paper folded in half and stapled with a color cover. The six-times-a-year publication accepted stories that were no longer than one page (about 600 words), also typical issues were 20 pages and carried 14-16 stories. The First Line paid its contributors for two issues.

In 2002, the magazine grew up. It became more standard: 8 ¼ by 5 ½ size and perfectly bound. Published quarterly, it averages 64 pages an issue. The logo was also changed, as were the cover (classic typewriter) and submission word count became up to 3,000 words. It also instituted a pay scale for contributors.

In 2003, David debuted a new press (Blue Cubicle Press) and released their first anthology: The Best of The First Line: The First Three Years, a collection of favorite stories published during the zine years.

In 2006, Jeff left The First Line to concentrate on his writing and other ventures. And in 2008, Blue Cubicle Press released the second TFL anthology to commemorate Jeff's departure, The Best of The First Line: Editors’ Picks: 2002–2006.

== Content ==
The purpose of The First Line is to jump-start the imagination—to help writers break through the block that is the blank page. Each issue contains the best short stories stemming from a common first line, with no restrictions on genre, style, or school of thought. It's an exercise in creativity for writers, and a chance for readers to see how many different directions writers can go in when they start from the same place. The First Line also provides a forum for discussing favorite lines in literature through academic or personal essays.

Most of the first lines are created by the editors. Every two or three years TFL holds a contest where readers submit possible first lines, and a few are chosen for publication.

Although the majority of authors are from the United States, TFL has published authors from India, South Africa, Egypt, Denmark, Estonia, and Australia, as well as Canada and the UK, just to name a few.
