= Dogland =

Novel by Will Shetterly

- First edition cover
- Author: Will Shetterly
- Language: English
- Genre: Fantasy novel
- Publisher: Tor Books
- Publication date: June 1997
- Publication place: United States
- Media type: Print (Hardback & Paperback)
- Pages: 445 pp
- ISBN: 978-0-312-85171-2
- OCLC: 36158703
- Dewey Decimal: 813/.54 21
- LC Class: PS3569.H458 D64 1997

Dogland is a fantasy novel by Will Shetterly, a fantasy and comic book writer. Published in June 1997, it is the novel Shetterly is most proud of. Dogland placed thirteenth in the annual Locus poll for best fantasy novel. The story is based on his own childhood and a tourist attraction that his parents owned called Dog Land. In 2007 Shetterly published a sequel, The Gospel of the Knife.

== Plot summary ==
The novel is told from the perspective of an adult called Christopher Nix who recounts the story of his family's move to Florida from New Orleans when he was four. The purpose of their move is so that his father can open a tourist attraction that exhibits every breed of dog recognized by the American Kennel Club. The story focuses on his father's "color-blind" approach to racial segregation and various controversies that occur in his life because of it.

== Reception ==
Gahan Wilson praised the novel, saying "The strength and effectiveness of the book come from Shetterly's placing and playing [its] bizarre, occult figures against a very real and effectively stirring account of events very true to the horrendous sort of action which was really and truly going on at the time". Paul Di Filippo similarly declared that Dogland "succeeds remarkably on a number of levels as mimetic autobiography . . . , as depiction of a fantastic midsummer dreamscape, and as Arthurian reenactment". Kirkus Reviews described it as "Compelling, absorbing, hard-edged work, lit by glimpses of another, more fantastic reality".

== Sources ==
- Greenman Review
- Rambles.net Review
