= Juniper, Gentian, and Rosemary =

1998 novel by Pamela Dean

- First edition cover
- Author: Pamela Dean
- Cover artist: Peter Gudynas
- Language: English
- Genre: Fantasy
- Set in: Minneapolis
- Published: 1998 by Tor Books
- Publication place: United States
- Media type: Print
- Pages: 350 pp
- ISBN: 978-0-3128-6004-2
- OCLC: 38378404
- Dewey Decimal: 813.54
- LC Class: PS3554.E1729

Juniper, Gentian, and Rosemary is a 1998 fantasy novel by Pamela Dean. It is published by Tor Books, and based on Dean's 1989 short story of the same name, which appeared in the anthology Things That Go Bump in the Night edited by Jane Yolen and Martin H. Greenberg. It is a retelling of the ballad Riddles Wisely Expounded.

== Synopsis ==
Juniper (age 16), Gentian (age 14), and Rosemary Meriweather (age 11) are three sisters living happily in Minneapolis in 1994, when their lives are disrupted – first, by the appearance of a strange house (which Gentian cannot remember being built) in the vacant lot next door, and second, by the appearance of Dominic Hardy, a teenage boy who speaks in quotations and riddles, and who recruits Gentian's help to build a time machine.

== Reception ==
Juniper was nominated for the 1999 Locus Award for Best Fantasy Novel, and included in Locus's "Recommended" list. Terri Windling has described it as one of "(Windling's) very favorite fantasy novels", and Mary Anne Mohanraj has stated that she "love[s]" Dean's integration of magical elements into a mundane setting.

On the other hand, SF Site's Margo McDonald felt that the book did not fulfil its potential, stating that the intellectual precocity of the characters and their friends was implausible, that — despite having been kept reading by the compelling portrayals of characters and their interrelationships — overall the plot did not hold her interest, and that on the whole, she found the book a disappointment.
