= Steel Rose (manhua) =

鋼鐵玫瑰 Gāng Tiě Méi Guī
- Genre
- Author: Ryan
- Publisher: Tong Li Comics (Taiwan)
- Original run: 2000–2004
- Volumes: 7

Steel Rose (traditional Chinese: 鋼鐵玫瑰; simplified Chinese: 钢铁玫瑰; pinyin: Gāng Tiě Méi Guī) is a Chinese-language comic, commonly also referred to as a manhua.

== Overview ==
Taekwondo Olympic gold medalist Lee Le Ting is portrayed as a protagonist who strikes terror into others with her arrogance and brutal fists. Little does she know she has captured the heart of a wealthy, handsome European bachelor, Louis, who has been infatuated with her since their first meeting. But Louis does all he can to bring himself closer to her.

== Characters ==
- Lee Le Ting 李樂亭; Lǐ Lè Tíng: an 18-year-old taekwondo champion from Taiwan. Le Ting runs away to New York after having a big spat with her grandfather, who disagrees with her plan to retire from taekwondo entirely. She mistakes Louis for a robber on the street and punches him landing him in the hospital. She was pulled into shooting an advertisement and becoming the spokesperson for the clothing company Xanadu by Louis as compensation for the hospital fees. Louis is seen as a rather sassy character.
- Louis Lorenzo 路易斯 羅倫佐; Lùyìsī Luólúnzuǒ: A well sought after European bachelor who only has eyes for Le Ting. He has a strangely optimistic and happy-go-lucky personality even in the worst situations. He pulls Le Ting into the advertisement under the pretense of repaying him but actually is only using it as an excuse to try to get closer to her. Affectionately called "Lulu" by Jiayu.

Although he was adopted by Yung Jo's parents, he treats Yung Jo as a real brother. His biological father is Cloud's father, who had a passionate love affair with his then 15-year-old mother, Isabella, making Cloud his half brother. As he grew older, his mother came back for him and brought him to his biological father. His mother had become a fashion designer, and because there was no one to model the appearance in full clothing and makeup of the "Charlotte" doll, she had Louis do it temporarily. Accidentally, Cloud saw "Charlotte" who was really Louis in disguise.

- Cloud 柯勞德; Kēláodé: Louis' rival. They were schoolmates since middle school. He is CEO of Xanadu Clothing Company. It seems he has something called the "Charlotte's curse"; something only he and Louis know about. Later it is revealed Cloud has had a longtime infatuation with a girl named Charlotte who he saw briefly by chance when he was younger. He did not realize at the time it was Louis dressed up as Charlotte. He believes Louis stole Charlotte away from him. Cloud holds a deep resentment for Louis because of this, as well as Louis being the favored son of their father.
- Ding Jiayu 丁家羽; Dīng Jiā Yǔ: Le Ting's best friend who is a photographer.
- Yung Jo/Juliano Lorenzo 楊昭/朱里安諾 羅倫佐; Yáng Zhāo/Zhūlǐānnuò Luólúnzuǒ: a photographer who is Jiayu's boyfriend. He is half Chinese. Louis is his brother, but they do not share the same blood because Yung Jo's father adopted Louis as his own.
- Isabella Fauchon 伊莎貝拉 芙尚; Yīshābèilā Fúshàng: Louis' biological mother whom he took his looks after. She left him in Yung Jo's father, Emilio's adoptive care after she realized she wasn't financially stable enough to look after her son as a single mother. When she reunited with the adolescent Louis, she had already become an internationally famous wedding dress designer.
- Andrea/Angela Chinese: 安桌亞; pinyin: Ānzhuōy: Chosen by Cloud to be spokesperson for Xanadu along with Le Ting. She is an Olympic gold medalist in gymnastics representing Romania. Only 145 cm tall.
- Marcus 馬可斯; Mǎkěsī: Louis' assistant. His first assignment is the Xanadu photoshoot, which he is increasingly nervous about.
- Zhang Fen Fang 張芬芳; Zhāng Fēn Fāng: Jiayu's mother.
