= War for the Oaks =

1987 fantasy novel by Emma Bull

- Author: Emma Bull
- Cover artist: Pamela Patrick
- Language: English
- Genre: Fantasy
- Set in: Minneapolis
- Publisher: Ace Books
- Publication date: 1987
- Publication place: United States
- Media type: Print (paperback)
- Pages: 309
- ISBN: 0-441-87073-2
- OCLC: 16615723

War for the Oaks is a 1987 fantasy novel by American writer Emma Bull. The book tells the story of Eddi McCandry, a rock musician who finds herself unwillingly pulled into the supernatural faerie conflict between good and evil. War for the Oaks is one of the first works in the subgenre of urban fantasy: although it involves supernatural characters, the setting (Minneapolis) is decidedly real-world. The novel is considered one of the first examples of the subgenre known as romantasy.

== Plot summary ==
Walking home one night through the streets of Minneapolis after quitting her rock band and breaking up with her boyfriend, Eddi McCandry discovers that she is being pursued by a threatening man and an even more threatening black dog. They turn out to be one and the same: a shapeshifting prankster faerie known as a phouka, who drafts Eddi to be the linchpin in the ongoing battle between faerie's good and noble Seelie Court and the evil Unseelie Court, ruled by the Queen of Air and Darkness. Eddi soon finds herself in a struggle for survival against the Unseelie Court, all while trying to put a new rock band together. Meanwhile, her initial feelings of resentment toward the phouka develop into gratitude for his efforts to protect her against the dark queen, and ultimately turn into love. The novel climaxes in a rock concert playoff between Eddi and the Queen of Air and Darkness, which decides the fate of both faerie courts, as well as the fate of her loved one.

== Characters ==
Eddi McCandry
The book's protagonist. A guitarist and gifted singer; the nature of her gift is revealed during the course of the novel. Several plot points in the book involve her relationships with her ex-boyfriend Stuart Kline, Willy Silver, and the phouka.
Phouka
A trickster faerie deascribed in the novel as resembling the musician Prince with the ability to shapechange into a dog. He is never named in the book, although at one point in the novel he temporarily adopts the name Robin Goode, Robin Goodfellow being an alternative name for Puck, a character from William Shakespeare’s A Midsummer Night's Dream. Puck is an alternate spelling of puca or phouka. When he meets Eddi, he is nominally working on behalf of the Seelie Court, but it is revealed he has other motives for his actions.
Carla DiAmato
Eddi's best friend and confidante, and drummer for her band. Carla is instrumental to the formation of the band - she pressures Eddi into starting one and suggests their name, Eddi and the Fey.
Dan Rochelle
Keyboard player for Eddi's band. Eventually, he and Carla fall in love.
Hedge
Bassist who responds to Eddi's classified ad. He is reserved most of the time, but at one point sings a soft, tuneful folk song. Member of Faerie, allied to the Seelie Court.
Willy Silver
Lead guitarist who responds to Eddi's classified ad. Willy is one of the Daoine Sidhe and a member of the Seelie Court.

== Allusions/references from other works ==
Many references are made to British folklore. During the course of the novel, Eddi meets a glaistig, the phouka, a brownie, and redcaps. Many traditional beliefs about faeries are incorporated; for example, their aversion to rowan berries and St John's wort.

Rock music also features prominently in the novel. Much of the novel is devoted to Eddi's efforts in putting together a rock band. Her band plays covers of songs by diverse musicians including Prince, Peter Gabriel, The Beatles, Kim Carnes, Men Without Hats, and Bram Tchaikovsky. Eddi also plays songs written by herself - in actuality of course, written by the author, Emma Bull. Some of these (including Wear My Face and For It All) were performed by the band Cats Laughing (of which Emma Bull is a member), and are on their second album Another Way To Travel.

There are also references to historical landmarks of Minneapolis as locations for the story. Eddi is chased down Nicollet Mall at night by the phouka; the Fey battles take place at Minnehaha Falls and at Como Park Zoo and Conservatory; and her band, Eddi and the Fey, plays at the Minneapolis College of Art and Design and at First Avenue, which is where the climactic playoff occurs for the fates of Minneapolis and the phouka. The opening band in that scene is Twin Cities Celtic-punk group Boiled in Lead, whose 1987 album Hotheads also appears in an earlier scene in Eddi's apartment.

== Awards and nominations ==
War for the Oaks won the Locus Award for Best First Novel and was a finalist for the Mythopoeic Fantasy Award.

== Film, TV or theatrical adaptations ==
- Emma Bull and her husband, Will Shetterly, have adapted the book into a screenplay. In turn, this was made into an eleven-minute short film or trailer. In an appendix to the book's reprint in 2001, Bull included an excerpt of the screenplay, and it was published in full by Hollywood Comics (ISBN 1-932983-08-2) on August 31, 2004.

== Release details ==
- 1987, USA, Ace Books ISBN 0-441-87073-2, Pub date 1987, Paperback
- 2001, USA, Orb Books ISBN 0-7653-0034-6, Pub date 6 July 2001, Paperback
