= Doglands =

Book by Tim Willocks

- First edition
- Author: Tim Willocks
- Cover artist: Angelo Rinaldi
- Language: English
- Genre: Children's literature, fantasy
- Publisher: Random House Books for Young Readers
- Publication date: 27 September 2011
- Publication place: Ireland
- Media type: Print (hardcover)
- Pages: 320
- ISBN: 978-0-375-96571-5
- OCLC: 444106080
- LC Class: PZ7.W68368 Do 2011

Doglands (2011) is a children's fantasy novel written by Tim Willocks. It was published by the Random House imprint Random House Books for Young Readers. It is written in the first-person point of view of the main character, a lurcher named Furgul.

The story begins with Furgul being born in a racing greyhound breeder's home, believed to be full greyhound because he is so young. As he grows, however, it becomes more clear that he's not full greyhound, and his mother has him run away with his sisters. He promises to go back and save his mother, Keeva, but along the way he discovers much more to life, such as being a pet, being a fugitive, being in the animal shelter, being in love, and revolting.

Doglands won the 2012 Montreuil Book Festival Prize for European Young Adult Fiction.

== Development and publication ==
=== Conception ===
Willocks says that for all his novels, he finds his inspiration in the "art that has the greatest effect" on him. Willocks also says that he wrote Doglands in forty-two days, saying that he was "completely devoured..." and he has "not followed the plan, but his instinct". Willocks also promises that Furgul will return to the heart of the Doglines.

=== Publication history ===
The hardcover, library binding and ebook editions were published on 27 September 2011 by Random House Children's Books. They were followed by the first paperback edition on 1 January 2012, published by Andersen Press, and a French edition published by Syros later in the year. A Random House paperback edition is due to be published on 25 September 2012.

== Plot summary ==
=== Part One: Bravedog ===
Keeva, a blue greyhound, gives birth to four pups. There are three girls and one boy; she names the girls Eena, Nessa, and Brid, and names the boy Furgul. They are raised to believe that they are pure greyhounds, but as they get older, Keeva tells Furgul that he must run, because he is really a lurcher, and because of how fast he is growing, Dedbone is going to find out and kill him. Keeva also tells him that he must find his father, Argal. Furgul promises to come back and save Keeva.

When it is the first day in racing season, Keeva is supposed to be placed in a cardboard box to go off to the racetrack. She plans to run away before her leash can be put on, giving the dogs time to jump into another, empty cardboard box and go to the racetrack, where they can escape. However, the Gambler finds them and furthermore notices that they are not greyhounds. Dedbone goes and gets his shotgun, and while he does, Furgul manages to help Brid escape. The other three are still in the box, and Dedbone shoots multiple times until Furgul manages to tip the box enough to fall out of the truck.

Eena dies immediately of her shotgun wounds, but Furgul was only hit in the leg and Nessa still manages to survive. Nessa and Furgul go to a cavern, and Furgul hunts for them. They plan to survive in the mountain, but a day later Nessa dies of her wounds, leaving Furgul alone. He feels her spirit leave and imagines that now she will help all spirits find their way in the mountains. He then leaves the mountain to follow the river, where he meets Gerry, who takes him home. After a bit of nagging from his wife Harriet, Gerry manages to convince her to keep Furgul, who meets up with Kinnear, a bulldog.

=== Part Two: The Dog Who Runs in Darkness ===
Furgul learns from Kinnear all of the rules of the household, which he disapproves of. He plans to escape. One day, Gerry and Harriet take Furgul to the dog park. There he meets Samantha, a pitch-black German Shepherd that shares his interests. They play-fight, but the owners don't understand and think that they are attacking each other, so they pull the dogs away from each other. Before they are taken away, Furgul learns that Samantha's real name is Dervla.

After the incident at the park, Gerry and Harriet don't want anything like that to happen again, so they decide that it's time for Furgul to get neutered. When Kinnear tells him what neutering really is, Furgul knows that he cannot let that happen and plans even more intently to escape. When they finally take him to the veterinarian's office, he bolts as soon as they take off his collar and doesn't look back.

Out on the streets he meets Pace, a Labrador Retriever and seeing-eye dog with an overwhelming sense of sarcasm. Pace tells him to go through the mall, but watch out for the guards. While there, he also meets eight miniature female dogs who fall madly in love with him and chase him through the mall. The chaos confuses the guards, though, and gives him the opportunity to escape.

As soon as he exits the mall, he gets captured by "The Traps", or the dogcatchers. While in the truck on the way to the animal shelter, he meets Zinni the papillon, Tess the beagle, and Skyver the mutt. The truck stops once again to get another dog, who turns out to be his father Argal. There, he learns that unlike the others, Argal isn't going to be given his five days in the shelter. He has been labelled a dangerous dog and is going to be killed as soon as they get to the shelter.

While at the shelter, Furgul meets with Brennus, a Saint Bernard who taught Argal what he knows. Before Argal is killed, they give him some time with Furgul and with Brennus. While there, Furgul is told about how the mysterious Doglands are inside of you, and that his spirit will always be with them, and you just have to feel it. Then he is taken away, and Furgul becomes the new shelter leader, being Argal's son. So angered by the death of his father, Furgul decides to have a revolt. All the cage doors are opened and the dogs break free, refusing to go anywhere until their demands are met.

During the revolt, Furgul meets with Jodi, a dog whisperer, who offers that all the dogs in the revolt come live at Appletree Dog Sanctuary instead of going back. What makes Furgul agree is that she says he will be killed when they go back because he will be labelled a dangerous dog like his father. They all live at Appletree for a while until Furgul hears a whimpering pup. When he goes to help the pup, he gets captured by two thieves, Tattoo and Spotty, and finds out that the pup was only hurt for the sake of the trap and didn't know any better. He gets labelled "dogmeat" and is fed to Gremlin, Lunk, Freak, and Chopper. Dervla comes out of the shadows and kills them. Seeing the dogs dead, Tattoo and Spotty put him with Dervla, where she tells him their job is to distract guard dogs while the two humans go burglarising. At the first house, Furgul meets with two Giant Schnauzers named Cogg and Baz and convinces them to attack Tattoo and Spotty with the bribe of bacon. After the attack, Cogg and Baz join Furgul and the others.

Dervla, Cogg, and Baz come to live at Appletree, and peace is retained for a short amount of time. Then Furgul expresses his desire to save his mother Keeva, and Jodi says that she will look up the racing greyhounds on the betting page of the papers. Dedbone is not listed because that was just the dog's name for him, so Jodi asks racing names until something rings a bell. Furgul remembers his mother telling him her racing name, but he just can't remember. Eventually he remembers that it's "Sapphire Breeze", and he and all the dogs go to the racetrack.

=== Part Three: The Dog Bunch ===
While on the racetrack, Keeva is in the lead and has only a few steps to go before she would win, but then the spirit of Argal washes over the racetrack and she begins to dance with glee at feeling it. Soon all of the other dogs begin to dance and none of them finish the race. Afterward, Dedbone prepares to kill Keeva for her "little act" on the track.

A plan is formulated to save Keeva, but when Furgul sees all the other greyhounds shut in Dedbone's Hole, he figures that he must save them all. Then he finds out that Tic and Tac, the bullmastiffs in Dedbone's Hole, have pups. Zinni has experience walking on wires, so she agitates the greyhounds enough with her presence for Dedbone to open the gates to see what the matter is. Then, the greyhounds charge and the battle begins.

Cogg and Baz, now aware of their newfound abilities in killing, kill all five of Tic and Tac's pups, and then Tic and Tac are killed themselves by other dogs. Furgul sees Dedbone driving away with Keeva in the back of the truck and races after her. Brennus sacrifices himself to save Keeva, getting shot attacking Dedbone and then lying injured until the truck runs him over, finally killing him. Right before he dies, Brennus tells Furgul to run "The Doglines", the places where the ancestors of the dogs walked. Then Skyver lunges at Dedbone, knocking him back enough for him to tip over the side of the chasm and die there.

== Characters ==
=== Major characters ===
Furgul, known briefly as Rupert, is the main character of the story. He is thought to be pure greyhound, but is really a lurcher. Because of this, he must escape before the breeder finds out. He promises to save his mother, Keeva, from the breeder, and succeeds in his goal. He is also somewhat crafty, and can get dogs on his side.

Dervla, also known as Samantha, is a black German Shepherd and Furgul's main love interest. They first meet at the park when they are both house dogs. She is captured by Spotty and Tattoo and beaten into being a guard dog.

Argal is Furgul's father, as well as the "king" of the Doglands. Brennus taught him everything that he knows, and he has escaped the Traps countless times. However, he gives up his life in the end and gets put down by lethal injection, which kickstarts the whole revolt.

Skyver is a mutt that Furgul meets in the traps, as well as Zinni and Tess. He is obsessed with being a friend of a famous dog; first Argal, and then Furgul. In the revolt, he is at first the only one who wants to leave, but then he goes back, ashamed, and starts chanting. Skyver finally proves himself in the final attack.

Brennus is a St. Bernard and old, close friend of Argal. When Furgul first sees him, he doesn't think much of Brennus's prowess because of all his scars, but finds out more about the dog and comes to respect him more. In the end, Brennus sacrifices himself to save the rest of the dogs and gets run over.

=== Minor characters ===
Keeva is Furgul's mother, who he goes back to save after escaping himself. She is a greyhound and top racer, and is almost killed by Dedbone after she begins dancing in the track when she feels Argal's spirit in her.

Nessa, Eena, and Brid are Furgul's three sisters. Brid successfully escapes Dedbone, Eena is killed by a shotgun, and Nessa dies of her wounds in a mountain.

Tic and Tac are two bullmastiffs who guard Dedbone's Hole. While Furgul is away, they have a litter of pups that Cogg and Baz kill in the final showdown, and the two are eventually killed themselves.

Kinnear, also known as Crennig, is a pet dog and a bulldog who is quite content with living at a person's house. He is the one who first tells Furgul that he's going to get neutered.

Milly, Molly, Mandy, etc. are eight female dogs: a Pomeranian, a cockapoo, a Miniature Schnauzer, a Jack Russell Terrier, a Cavalier King Charles Spaniel, a Yorkshire Terrier, a dachshund, and a Chow Chow. They fall in love with Furgul and cause a commotion in the mall when they see him again.

Pace is a seeing-eye dog and a Labrador Retriever who is a bit sarcastic. When Furgul escapes from Gerry and Harriet, Pace helps him get out and away.

Zinni is a papillon who got caught when a thief stole her diamond collar. Her talent with walking on wires made her an essential part of the final showdown.

Tess is a beagle who got separated from her owners and then caught by the dogcatchers. Later, during the revolt, she meets up with them again and says her goodbyes to the other dogs. She is deeply dismayed when Argal is killed.

Cogg and Baz, also known as Pumpkin and Pumpkin, are two Giant Schnauzers and guard dogs that are never good fighters because they are always arguing with each other, but Furgul manages to get them to help him with the promise of bacon.

Gremlin, Lunk, Freak, and Chopper are four dogs that Spotty and Tattoo keep in the carnival. Furgul is thrown in with them, but Dervla saves him and kills all four.

=== Humans ===
Dedbone is the leader of a slave camp of racing greyhounds, Keeva included. When he finds out that Furgul, Eena, Nessa, and Brid are lurchers, he goes after them with a shotgun, killing Eena and Nessa and injuring Furgul. When Keeva starts dancing, filled with the spirit of Argal, he goes to kill her for ruining the race. He is killed at the final showdown by Furgul.

The Gambler is Dedbone's sidekick, and the one who figures out that Furgul, Eena, Nessa, and Brid are lurchers and not greyhounds.

Gerry and Harriet are the owners of Kinnear and, briefly, Furgul. Gerry finds Furgul injured and takes him home, where he learns all the rules, but escapes before he can be neutered.

Jodi is a dog whisperer and owns Appletree Dog Sanctuary, where the dogs stay briefly after the revolt.

Spotty and Tattoo are two criminals who steal dogs. Most dogs they feed to Gremlin, Lunk, Freak, and Chopper, but some dogs, like Furgul, are used as bait to distract guard dogs while they burgle a house.

== Reception ==
=== Editorial reviews ===
Kirkus Reviews reviewed Doglands and praised it highly. The reviewer enjoyed the distinct personalities of the dogs. He also thought that the mystic lore of the Doglands was a good thing, adding a secondary layer of fantasy. He thought that the humans were only lightly sketched in, but believed that it was fitting considering the point of view. All in all, Doglands was considered "riveting."

VOYA also reviewed the book. The reviewer disliked the fact that, "with the exception of too-good-to-be-true Jodi", it seemed that the human characters were "one-dimensional sterotypes, mostly evil". The reviewer also found the scenes of violence to be a bit graphic. She praised Willocks for the creation of the Doglines, saying it is the "element that lifts the story above being just another dog story".

== Awards ==
Year	Award	Result	Reference
2012	Montreuil Book Festival Prize for European Young Adult Fiction	Won	

== See also ==
- Tim Willocks
- The Call of the Wild
