= Liavek =

Series of fantasy anthologies by Emma Bull & Will Shetterly

- First anthology, 1985, art by Gary Ruddell
- Editors: Emma Bull; Will Shetterly
- Cover artist: Gary Ruddell
- Series: Liavek (1985); The Players of Luck (1986); Wizard's Row (1987); Spells of Binding (1988); Festival Week (1990)
- Genre: Shared world fantasy
- Publisher: Ace Books
- Publication date: 1985–1990

Liavek is a fictional shared world city created as a setting for a series of five anthologies of fantasy short stories edited by Emma Bull and Will Shetterly and published by Ace Books between 1985 and 1990.

== Publication history ==
In 1978, Robert Lynn Asprin created a new genre of fiction, the "shared world" anthology, by designing a fictional fantasy city complete with notable residents of all social ranks. Asprin then invited popular fantasy writers of the time to write short stories using both the setting and other authors' characters. The result was the popular Thieves World anthology, which spawned 11 sequels. Other publishers scrambled to produce shared worlds of their own, including Merovingen Nights edited by C. J. Cherryh and Wild Cards edited by George R. R. Martin.

In Minneapolis/St. Paul, a group of aspiring fantasy writers, including Steven Brust, Will Shetterly, Emma Bull, Patricia Wrede, and Kara Dalkey, had formed a writers' group called "the Scribblies." Ace Book's editor Terri Windling approached the Scribblies about creating a fantasy shared world similar to Thieves World. But the Scribblies didn't like the harsh setting of Thieves World, asking why anyone would actually live there. Thieves World co-creator Lynn Abbey admitted that the setting was a dark place: "Sanctuary wasn't a provincial backwater; it wasn't even the Imperial armpit; it was the Black Hole of not-Calcutta." The Scribblies decided that their setting, Liavek, had be a place where all of them would enjoy living. As Steven Brust remarked, "One of the first things we decided was that it had to have a lot of all-night restaurants that served good coffee."

Once the setting and its special magical background was complete, each of the Scribblies contributed a short story. They also asked well-known authors such as Gene Wolfe to contribute a piece. The result, edited by Shetterly and Bull, was Liavek, published by Ace in 1985. Four more anthologies, also edited by Shetterly and Bull, followed: Liavek: The Players of Luck (1986); Liavek: Wizard’s Row (1987); Liavek: Spells of Binding (1988); and Liavek: Festival Week (1990). In addition, a number of other pieces of fiction were set in Liavek.

=== Licensing ===
In 2017, Shetterly and Bull announced they were allowing the use of the Liavek setting at no cost, for works earning less than $3000, subject to certain conditions.

== Contributors ==
Contributors included Bull, Shetterly, Gene Wolfe, Jane Yolen, John M. Ford, Kara Dalkey, Barry B. Longyear, Megan Lindholm, Nancy Kress, Patricia C. Wrede, Steven Brust, Nate Bucklin, Pamela Dean, Gregory Frost, Charles de Lint, Charles R. Saunders, Walter Jon Williams, Alan Moore and Bradley Denton.

== Setting ==
Located on the southern shore of the Sea of Luck at the mouth of the Cat River, Liavek is a trade city. Everyone has some magical ability and luck that surfaces on their birthday for the length of time one's mother was in labor. But this magic and luck then drains away for the rest of the year. Each person, on their birthday, can, for the length of time equal to their mother's labor invest luck or magic in an object. This object can then be used to power spells for the rest of the year. However, the process of capturing one's magic is difficult and potentially fatal.

== Reception ==
In Issue 36 of Abyss, Eric Olson reviewed the first anthology and thought that "Overall, the world is mildly interesting, the characters fresh, and the stories mostly good. The series will live or die on the selection of writers for the next book and the development of more connections between the stories and a dash of the intrigue which is so strong in the Thieves World series." Olsen concluded, "Liavek looks like a bit of a pale version of Thieves World right now, but shows signs of a bright future."

Orson Scott Card found the first anthology to be "an example of what can be accomplished [in a shared-world project] when almost everything goes right."

Terri Windling called the fourth anthology, Liavek: Spells of Binding, "one of the notable collections of fantasy published in '88 ... featuring good original fiction from the Minneapolis Fantasy Writers' Group and others."

John Bunnell reviewed several of the anthologies for Dragon:

- Liavek: "Both the eleven tales and the editing in Liavek are uniformly excellent — not unexpected, given the track records of many of the people involved ... The real surprise is the beautifully intricate web that holds all eleven tales in a remarkably consistent framework. Liavek is an entirely credible, well-designed world where political intrigue and complicated magic are thoroughly intertwined."
- Liavek: The Players of Luck: "This second volume in the shared world of the Minnesota-based Scribblies and their colleagues matches the first for quality of vision and thoroughness of editing, and ought to establish Liavek as the one true gem in the suddenly crowded category of collaborative universe fiction."
- Liavek: Wizard's Row: "It has no problem delivering on its promise of enjoyment ... the stories are as well-crafted as ever, and offer a pleasant balance between new and returning characters."
- Liavek: Spells of Binding: "notable both for several strong individual stories and for the threads crossing between them ... Editors Will Shetterly and Emma Bull continue to put Liavek at the top of the shared-world lists, but may need new characters to populate future volumes."

== Awards ==
Liavek: Players of Luck was a finalist for a World Fantasy Award in 1987.

== Works ==
=== Anthologies ===
All anthologies were edited by Will Shetterly and Emma Bull, and published by Ace Books

Liavek (1985)

- "Badu's Luck"—Emma Bull
- "The Green Rabbit from S'Rian"—Gene Wolfe
- "Ancient Curses"—Patricia C. Wrede
- "Birth Luck"—Nancy Kress
- "An Act of Contrition"—Steven Brust
- "The Inn of the Demon Camel"—Jane Yolen
- "The Hands of the Artist"—Kara Dalkey
- "The Green Cat"—Pamela Dean
- "A Coincidence of Birth"—Megan Lindholm
- "Bound Things"—Will Shetterly
- "The Fortune Maker"—Barry B. Longyear

Liavek: The Players of Luck (1986)

- "A Happy Birthday"—Will Shetterly
- "Before the Paint is Dry"—Kara Dalkey
- "The Rat's Alley Shuffle"—Charles de Lint
- "Two Houses in Saltigos"—Pamela Dean
- "Rikiki and the Wizard"—Patricia C. Wrede
- "Dry Well"—Nathan A. Bucklin
- "Choice of the Black Goddess"—Gene Wolfe
- "The Ballad of the Quick Levars" (song)—Jane Yolen and Adam Stemple
- "Pot Luck"—Megan Lindholm
- "Show of Faith"—Gregory Frost
- "An Act of Trust"—Steven Brust
- "Ishu's Gift"—Charles R. Saunders
- "A Cup of Worrynot Tea"—John M. Ford
- "The Well-Made Plan"—Emma Bull

Liavek: Wizard's Row (1987)

- "An Act of Mercy"—Megan Lindholm and Steven Brust
- "Green Is the Color"—John M. Ford
- "Paint the Meadows with Delight"—Pamela Dean
- "The World in the Rock"—Kara Dalkey
- "Baker’s Dozen"—Bradley Denton
- "Cenedwine Brocade"—Caroline Stevermer
- "A Hypothetical Lizard"—Alan Moore
- "Training Ground"—Nancy Kress
- "City of Luck" (song)—Jane Yolen and Adam Stemple
- "The Ballad of the Quick Levars" (song)—Jane Yolen and Adam Stemple
- "Eel Island Shoals" (song)—John M. Ford
- "Pot-Boil Blues" (song)—John M. Ford
- "A Handbook for the Apprentice Magician"

Liavek: Spells of Binding (1988)

- "Riding the Hammer"—John M. Ford
- "Portrait of Vengeance"—Kara Dalkey
- "The Skin and Knife Game"—Lee Barwood and Charles de Lint
- "Strings Attached"—Nathan A. Bucklin
- "The Last Part of the Tragical History of Acrilat"—Pamela Dean
- "Mad God"—Patricia C. Wrede
- "The Tale of the Stuffed Levar"—Jane Yolen
- "An Act of Love"—Steven Brust, Gregory Frost and Megan Lindholm
- "Spells of Binding" (poem)—Pamela Dean

Liavek: Festival Week (1990)

- "Consequences"—Walter Jon Williams
- "As Bright as New Coppers"—Bradley Denton
- "The Grand Festival: Sestina" (poem)—John M. Ford
- "Divination Day: Invocation" (poem)—John M. Ford
- "A Hot Night at Cheeky's"—Steven Brust
- "Birth Day: Sonnet" (poem)—John M. Ford
- "A Prudent Obedience"—Kara Dalkey
- "Procession Day/Remembrance Night: Processonal/Recessional" (poem)—John M. Ford
- "A Necessary End"—Pamela Dean
- "Bazaar Day: Ballad" (poem)—John M. Ford
- "The True Tale of Count Dashif's Demise"—Jane Yolen
- "Festival Day: Catechism" (poem)—John M. Ford
- "Six Days Outside the Year"—Will Shetterly
- "The Levar's Night Out"—Patricia C. Wrede
- "Restoration Day: Plainsong"—John M. Ford
