= Kara Dalkey =

American novelist (born 1953)

Kara Mia Dalkey
- Born: 1953 (age 72–73); Los Angeles, California, U.S.
- Education: Fashion Institute of Design & Merchandising
- Spouse: John Barnes (divorced 2001)
- Writing career
- Genre: Fantasy

Kara Mia Dalkey (born 1953) is an American author of young adult fiction and historical fantasy.

== Personal life ==
She was born in Los Angeles and has lived in Minneapolis, Pittsburgh, Colorado, and Seattle. Much of her fiction is set in the Heian period of Japan.

She was married to author John Barnes; they divorced in 2001. She is a member of the Pre-Joycean Fellowship and of the Scribblies.

== Education ==
She is a graduate of the Fashion Institute of Design & Merchandising in Los Angeles.

== Literary work ==
Her works include The Sword of Sagamore, Steel Rose, Little Sister and The Nightingale. The latter book is part of Terri Windling's Fairy Tale Series. Her short stories are featured in the Liavek anthologies, Firebirds: An Anthology of Original Fantasy and Science Fiction, and Firebirds Rising. Liavek was a shared-world series edited by Emma Bull and Will Shetterly. Ace Books published Liavek and thus many of the Scribblies' first short stories.

Her Water Trilogy is a blend of the Atlantis myth with Arthurian legends.

Her stories "Lady Shobu" and "The Rule of Silence" are part of the Buffy the Vampire Slayer anthologies from Simon & Schuster.

== Musical background ==
She is also a musician and has gigged extensively on electric bass (which she plays left-handed) and harmony vocals, with such bands as Runestone, the Albany Free Traders, and Nate Bucklin and the Ensemble (in Minnesota) and Relic and Voodoo Blue (in Seattle.) At different times she has also played drums, banjo and acoustic guitar. She is a songwriter, but her total output is low, and no CD or other album is in the works.

== Bibliography ==
=== Sagamore ===
- The Curse of Sagamore (1986)
- The Sword of Sagamore (1989)

=== Mitsuko ===
- Little Sister (1996)
- The Heavenward Path (1998)

=== Blood of the Goddess ===
1. Goa (1996)
2. Bijapur (1997)
3. Bhagavati (1998)

=== Water Trilogy ===
1. Ascension (2002)
2. Reunion (2002)
3. Transformation (2002)

=== Other novels ===
- The Nightingale (1988)
- Euryale (1988)
- Steel Rose (1997)
- Crystal Sage (1999)
- Genpei (2000)
- Sword Named Sorrow (2021)

=== Short stories ===
- "The Hands of the Artist" in Liavek, edited by Will Shetterly & Emma Bull, published by Ace Books in 1985.
- "Before the Paint is Dry" in Liavek: The Players of Luck, edited by Will Shetterly & Emma Bull, published by Ace Books in 1986.
- "The World in the Rock" in Liavek: Wizard’s Row, edited by Will Shetterly & Emma Bull, published by Ace Books in 1987.
- "Portrait of Vengeance" in Liavek: Spells of Binding, edited by Will Shetterly & Emma Bull, published by Ace Books in 1988.
- "A Prudent Obedience" in Liavek: Festival Week, edited by Will Shetterly & Emma Bull, published by Ace Books in 1990.
- "Lady Shobu" in Tales of the Slayer, published by Simon & Schuster in 2002.
- "Lady of the Ice Garden" in Firebirds: An Anthology of Original Fantasy and Science Fiction, ed. Sharyn November, published by Firebird Books in 2003.
- "The Rule of Silence" in Tales of the Slayer, published by Simon & Schuster in 2004.
- "Hives" in Firebirds Rising: An Anthology of Original Science Fiction and Fantasy, ed. Sharyn November, published by Firebird Books in 2006.
- "Flatland" in Firebirds Soaring: An Anthology of Original Speculative Fiction ed. Sharyn November, published by Firebird Books in 2009.
- "The Philosopher Duck" in Asimov's Science Fiction, June 2014.
- "The Midden" in The First Line ed. David LaBounty, published by Blue Cubicle Press in summer 2016.
- "American Angel" in After the Orange ed. Manny Frishberg, published by B Cubed Press in 2017.
- "Ancestral Key" in The First Line ed. David LaBounty, published by Blue Cubicle Press in summer 2020.

== Award nominations ==
- The Nightingale - Nominee - 1989 Mythopoeic Fantasy Award for fantasy novel
- Heavenward Path - Nominee - 1999 Mythopoeic Fantasy Award for children's literature
- "Lady of the Ice Garden" - Short list - The 2003 James Tiptree, Jr. Award
