= Emma Bull =

American speculative fiction writer (born 1954)

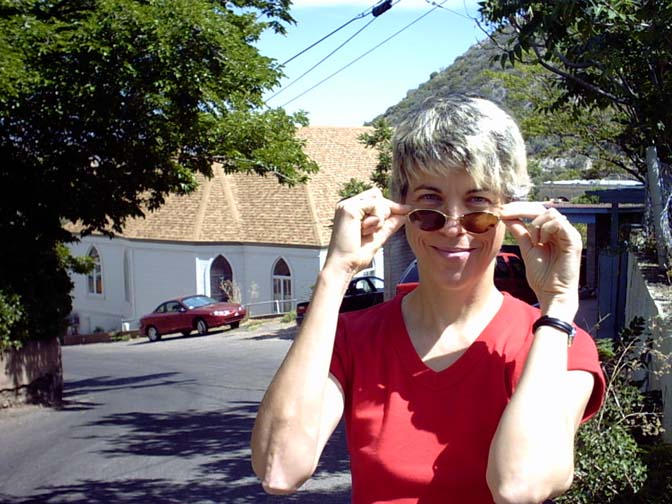
- In Bisbee, Arizona (2003)
- Born: December 13, 1954 (age 71); Torrance, California, U.S.
- Education: Beloit College
- Occupation: Writer
- Spouse: Will Shetterly
- Writing career
- Language: English
- Subjects: Science fiction Fantasy
- Notable works: War for the Oaks; Bone Dance
- Notable awards: Locus –First Novel

Emma Bull (born December 13, 1954) is an American science fiction and fantasy author. Her novels include the Hugo- and Nebula-nominated Bone Dance and the urban fantasy War for the Oaks. She is also known for a series of anthologies set in Liavek, a shared universe that she created with her husband, Will Shetterly. As a singer, songwriter, and guitarist, she has been a member of the Minneapolis-based folk/rock bands Cats Laughing and The Flash Girls.

== Early years ==
Emma Bull was born in Torrance, California. She attended Beloit College in Wisconsin, and graduated in 1976 with a degree in English Literature and Composition. After graduating, she worked for a while as a journalist and graphic designer.

== Career ==
Emma Bull's best-known novel is War for the Oaks, one of the pioneering works of urban fantasy.

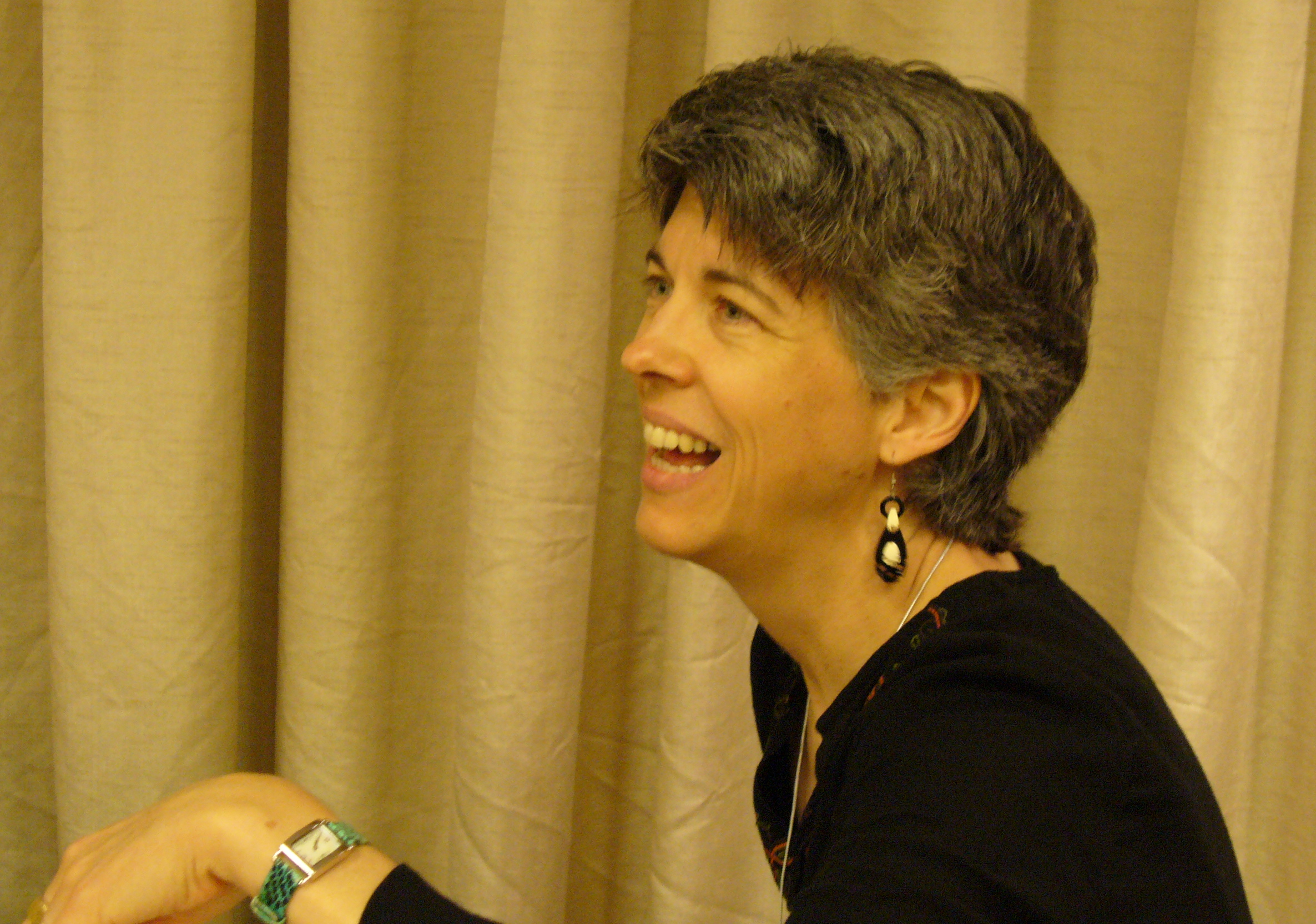
Emma Bull at Wiscon, 2006

Her 1991 post-apocalyptic science fiction novel Bone Dance was nominated for the Hugo, Nebula, and World Fantasy Awards. She was a member of the writing group The Scribblies, which included her husband, Will Shetterly, as well as Pamela Dean, Kara Dalkey, Nate Bucklin, Patricia Wrede and Steven Brust.

With Steven Brust, Bull wrote Freedom and Necessity (1997), an epistolary novel set during the 19th century Chartist movement of the United Kingdom of Great Britain and Ireland.

=== Shared universes ===
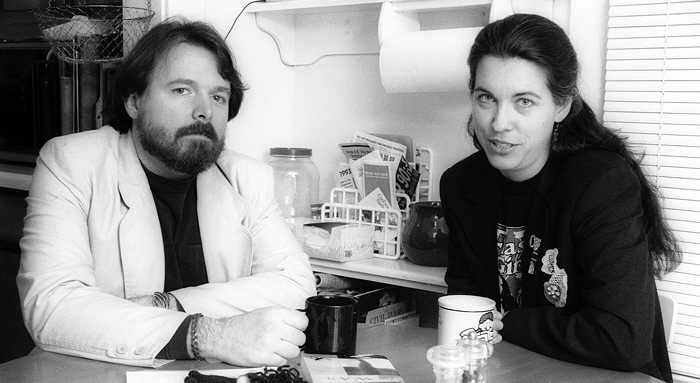
Will Shetterly and Emma Bull (1994)

Bull and Shetterly created the shared universe of Liavek, for which they have both written stories. There are five Liavek collections extant.

Bull has also participated in Terri Windling's Borderland shared universe, which is the setting of her 1994 novel Finder.

=== Music ===
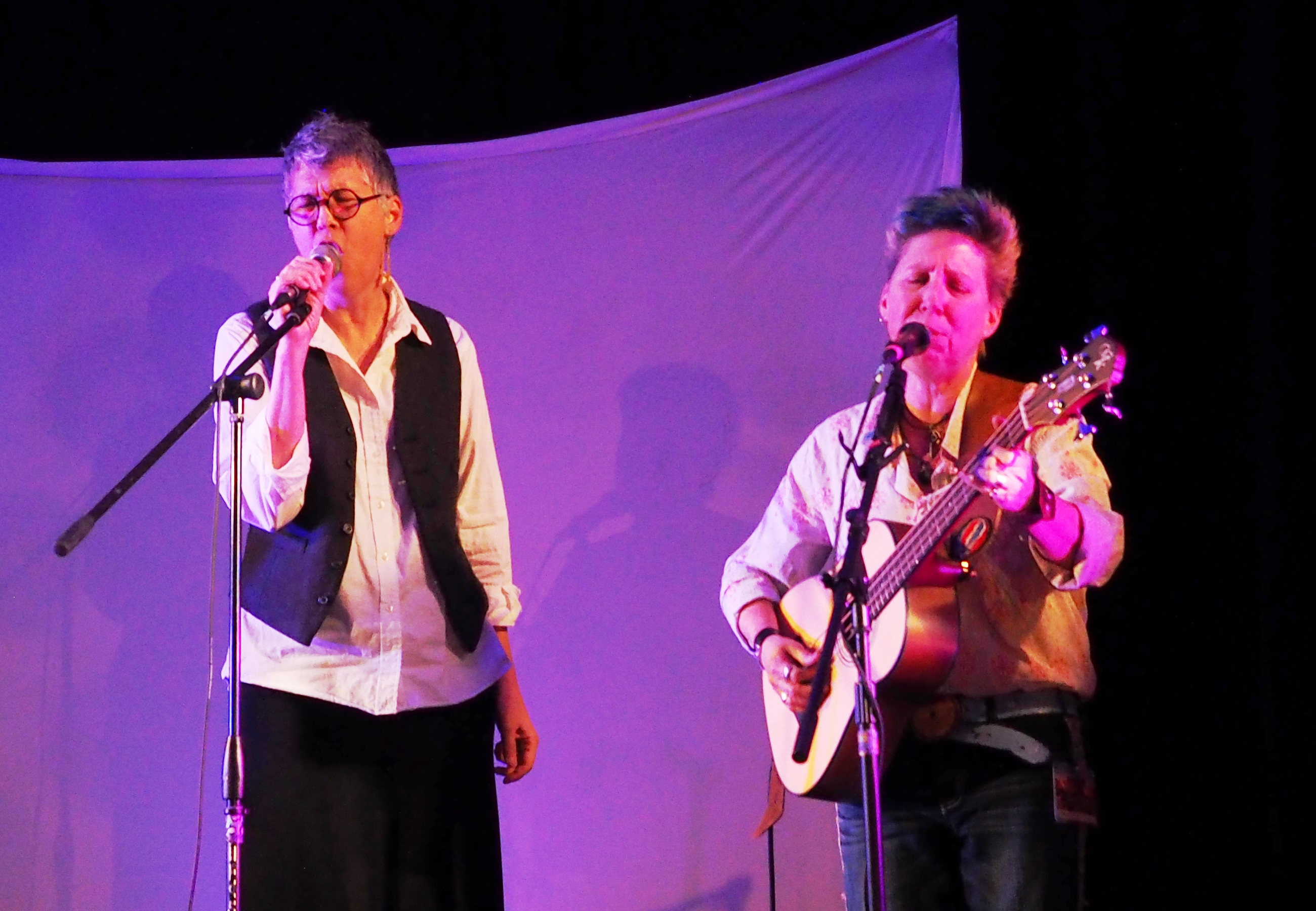
Emma Bull and Lojo Russo at Cats Laughing reunion concert, April 2015

In the late 1980s and early 1990s, Bull sang in the Minneapolis-based rock-folk band Cats Laughing. She also reunited with the band for two concerts in 2015, including a reunion show at the Minicon 50 science fiction convention. Bull appears on Cats Laughing's two studio albums, and on the live CD and reunion concert DVD Cats Laughing: A Long Time Gone (2016).

From the early 1990s to 2001, Bull also both sang and played guitar in the "goth-folk" duo The Flash Girls, with whom she recorded three albums.

=== Screenwriting ===
Bull wrote a screenplay for War for the Oaks, which was made into an 11-minute mini-film designed to look like a film trailer. She made a cameo appearance as the Queen of the Seelie Court, and Will Shetterly directed.

She is Executive Producer and one of the writers for Shadow Unit, along with Shetterly, Elizabeth Bear, Sarah Monette, and Amanda Downum.

== Personal life ==
Bull and Shetterly live in Minneapolis, Minnesota.

== Bibliography ==
=== Novels ===
- War for the Oaks (1987)
- Falcon (1989)
- Bone Dance (1991)
- Finder (1994)
- Freedom and Necessity (1997, with Steven Brust)
- Territory (2007)

=== Short works ===
- "Rending Dark" (1984) in Sword and Sorceress, edited by Marion Zimmer Bradley
- "Badu's Luck" (1985) in Liavek
- "The Well-Made Plan" (1986) in Liavek: The Players of Luck
- "Danceland Blood" (1986, with Will Shetterly) as "Danceland" in Bordertown, edited by Terri Windling
- "Wonders of the Invisible World" (1988 essay) in October–November issue of New North Artscape
- "A Bird That Whistles" (1989) in Hidden Turnings, edited by Diana Wynne Jones
- "Why I Write Fantasy" (1990 essay) in Pulphouse 6
- "For It All" (1991; poem)
- "Silver or Gold" (1992) in After the King: Stories in Honor of J. R. R. Tolkien, edited by Martin H. Greenberg
- The Princess and the Lord of Night (1994)
- Wonders of the Invisible World (1994; essay)
- "The Stepsister's Story" (1995; poem) in The Armless Maiden, edited by Terri Windling
- "Joshua Tree" (2002) in The Green Man: Tales from the Mythic Forest, edited by Ellen Datlow and Terri Windling
- "The Black Fox" (2003) in Firebirds, edited by Sharyn November
- "De la Tierra" (2004) in The Faery Reel, edited by Ellen Datlow and Terri Windling
- "What Used to Be Good Still Is" (2006) in Firebirds Rising, edited by Sharyn November
- "Cuckoo" (2009; with Elizabeth Bear & Leah Bobet)
- "Nine Oracles" (2011)
- "Incunabulum" (2011)
- "My Generation" (2011; poem)
- "The Last of John Ringo" (2012)
- "Man of Action" (2012)

=== Collection ===
- Double Feature (1994, collected works with Will Shetterly) from NESFA Press
- And Other Stories (2012) (with Will Shetterly)

=== Anthology series ===
- Liavek (1985, Ace Books, edited with Will Shetterly)
- Liavek: The Players of Luck (1986, Ace Books, edited with Will Shetterly)
- Liavek: Wizard's Row (1987, Ace Books, edited with Will Shetterly)
- Liavek: Spells of Binding (1988, Ace Books, edited with Will Shetterly)
- Liavek: Festival Week (1990, Ace Books, edited with Will Shetterly)

== Discography ==
With Cats Laughing:

- Bootleg Issue (1988)
- Another Way to Travel (1990)
- A Long Time Gone (forthcoming CD and concert DVD, 2016)

With The Flash Girls

- The Return of Pansy Smith and Violet Jones (1993)
- Maurice and I (1994)
- Play Each Morning Wild Queen (2001)

== Awards ==
- Nominee, 1986 Locus Award, Best Anthology for Liavek
- Nominee, 1987 World Fantasy Award, Best Collection for Liavek: The Players of Luck
- Winner, 1988 Locus Award, Best First Novel for War for the Oaks
- Nominee, 1988 Mythopoeic Fantasy Award for War for the Oaks
- Nominee, 1988 Locus Award, Best Fantasy Novel for War for the Oaks
- Nominee, 1990 Locus Award, Science Fiction Novel for Falcon
- Nominee, 1991 Philip K. Dick Award, Best Novel for Bone Dance
- Nominee, 1992 Locus Award, Best Science Fiction Novel for Bone Dance
- Nominee, 1992 World Fantasy Award, Best Novel for Bone Dance
- Nominee, 1992 Hugo Award, Best Novel for Bone Dance
- Nominee, 1992 Nebula Award, Best Novel for Bone Dance
- Nominee, 1993 Nebula Award, Best Novella for "Silver or Gold"
- Nominee, 1995: Locus Award, Best Fantasy Novel for Finder
- Nominee, 1995: Mythopoeic Awards, Best Children's Literature for The Princess and the Lord of Night
- Nominee, 1998: Locus Award, Best Fantasy Novel for Freedom & Necessity
- Nominee, 2007: Locus Award, Best Novelette for What Used to Be Good Still Is
- Nominee, 2008: Locus Award, Best Fantasy Novel for Territory
- Nominee, 2010: Locus Award, Novella for Cuckoo
- Nominee, 2008 World Fantasy Award, Best Novel for Territory
- Nominee, 2014 Cando Award, Best Novel for Territory
