= Will Shetterly =

American fantasy and science fiction author (born 1955)

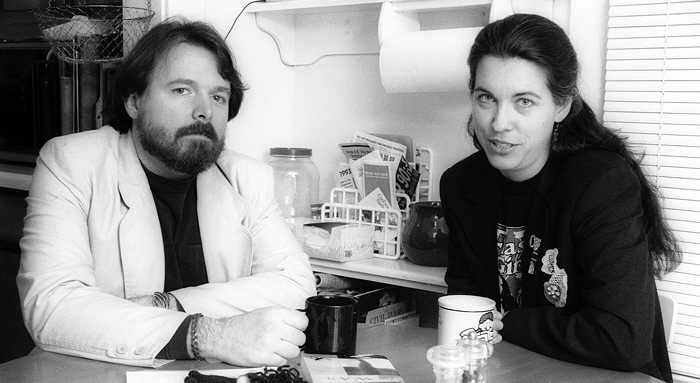
Will Shetterly and Emma Bull in 1994

Will Shetterly (born 1955) is an American writer of fantasy and science fiction best known for his novel Dogland (1997). The novel is inspired by his childhood at the tourist attraction Dog Land owned by his parents. He won the Minnesota Book Award for Fantasy & Science Fiction for his novel Elsewhere (1991), and was a finalist with Nevernever (1993); both books are set in Terri Windling's The Borderland Series shared universe. He has also written short stories for various Borderland anthologies.

== Biography ==
Shetterly is married to the author Emma Bull. The couple lives in Minneapolis, Minnesota, and were both members of the writing group The Scribblies, which also included, Pamela Dean, Kara Dalkey, Nate Bucklin, Patricia Wrede, and Steven Brust. Shetterly and Bull created and edited the Liavek shared universe anthologies.

Shetterly created the comic book character Captain Confederacy, played a small role in the film Toxic Zombies, and ran for governor of Minnesota in 1994 on the Grassroots Party ticket.

In 2009, he donated his archive to the department of Rare Books and Special Collections at Northern Illinois University.

== Bibliography ==
=== Short stories ===
- "Bound Things" (Liavek. Ace Books, 1985)
- "A Happy Birthday" (Liavek: The Players of Luck. Ace Books, 1986)
- "Six Days Outside the Year" (Liavek: Festival Week. Ace Books, 1990)
- "Nevernever" (Life on the Border, Terri Windling, ed., Tor Books, 1991)
- "Time Travel, the Artifact, and a Significant Historical Personage" (Xanadu, Jane Yolen, ed., Tor Books, 1993)
- "Danceland" (with Emma Bull) (Bordertown, Edited by Terri Windling. Signet Books and Tor Books, 1996)
- "The Princess Who Kicked Butt" (A Wizard's Dozen, edited by Michael Stearns. Harcourt Brace, 1993;
- Year's Best Fantasy and Horror, Seventh Annual Collection, Ellen Datlow and Terri Windling, eds., St. Martin's Press, 1994; Cricket (Feb 1997))
- "Oldthings" (Xanadu 2, edited by Jane Yolen. Tor Books, 1994)
- "Brian and the Aliens", (Bruce Coville's Book of Aliens: Tales to Warp Your Mind, Bruce Coville, ed., Scholastic, 1995)
- "Dream Catcher" (The Armless Maiden, edited by Terri Windling. Tor Books, 1995)
- "Taken He Cannot Be" (Peter Beagle's Immortal Unicorn, edited by Peter S. Beagle and Janet Berliner. HarperPrism, 1995; Eos 1999 (paperback ed.)
- "Secret Identity]" (from A Starfarer's Dozen, edited by Michael Stearns. Harcourt, 1995)
- "Splatter" (The Sandman Book of Dreams, Neil Gaiman & Ed Kramer, ed. Harper Prism, 2002)
- "Little Red and the Big Bad" (Swan Sister, edited by Ellen Datlow and Terri Windling. Simon & Schuster, 2003)
- "The People Who Owned the Bible" (Self-published on Will Shetterly's blog, January 10, 2005)
- "Kasim's Haj" (Self-published on Will Shetterly's blog and given into the public domain, January 1, 2006)

=== Novels ===
- Cats Have No Lord (1985)
- Witch Blood (1986)
- The Tangled Lands (1989)
- Elsewhere (1991)
- Nevernever (1993)
- Dogland (1997)
- Chimera (2000)
- Thor's Hammer (The Voyage of the Basset) (2000)
- The Gospel of the Knife (July 2007)
- Midnight Girl (published online)

=== Collection ===
- Double Feature (1995, collected works with Emma Bull) from NESFA Press

=== Anthology series ===
- Liavek (1985, Ace Books, edited with Emma Bull)
- Liavek: The Players of Luck (1986, Ace Books, edited with Emma Bull)
- Liavek: Wizard's Row (1987, Ace Books, edited with Emma Bull)
- Liavek: Spells of Binding (1988, Ace Books, edited with Emma Bull)
- Liavek: Festival Week (1990, Ace Books, edited with Emma Bull)

=== Nonfiction ===
- How to make a Social Justice Warrior: On identitarianism, intersectionality, mobbing, racefail, and failfans 2005-2014 (2014)

== Awards ==
He won the Minnesota Book Award for Fantasy & Science Fiction for his novel Elsewhere, and was nominated for the 2008 World Fantasy Award for his novel, The Gospel of the Knife.
