= Old Lead =

1991 compilation album by Boiled in Lead

Compilation album by Boiled in Lead
- Released: 1991
- Genre: Celtic rock/Celtic punk, folk punk, gypsy punk
- Label: Omnium Records

Boiled in Lead chronology
Orb (1990)	Old Lead (1991)	Antler Dance (1994)

Professional ratings
Review scores
Source	Rating
AllMusic	3/5 stars
Guinness Encyclopedia of Popular Music	3/4 stars
MusicHound Folk	4/5 stars
Green Man Review	(positive)

Old Lead is an album by Minneapolis folk punk band Boiled in Lead. It collects the band's first two studio albums, 1985's BOiLeD iN lEaD and 1987's Hotheads, along with two tracks recorded during the Hotheads sessions.

== Critical reception ==
Chuck Lipsig of Green Man Review praised the previously unreleased song “Lovely Joan” as "one of the most intensely sensual, almost erotic, renditions I’ve heard of any traditional tune." AllMusic's Chip Renner noted that Old Lead shows a progression from the raw sound of Boiled in Lead's first album to the more polished sound of its second. Tim Walters of the guide MusicHound Folk stated that while the material on Old Lead is "less technically adept than their later releases," the band's "energy and inventiveness" are apparent.

== Track listing ==
No.	Title	Length
1.	"The Man Who Was Boiled In Lead"	4:12
2.	"Banish Misfortune / The Road to Lisdoonvarna / O'Keefe's Slide"	3:58
3.	"Byker Hill"	3:07
4.	"Jamie Across The Water"	2:03
5.	"Arpad's Guz"	1:39
6.	"Over Under Sideways Down"	2:38
7.	"Walls Of Liscarroll / The Connachtman's Rambles"	2:19
8.	"Fisher's Hornpipe"	3:08
9.	"Tom And Jerry / Nine Points Of Roguery"	3:16
10.	"Twa Corbies"	3:27
11.	"As I Roved Out"	4:09
12.	"The Galtee Set"	2:35
13.	"House-Husband's Lament (Rockin' The Cradle)"	4:14
14.	"French Tunes"	2:44
15.	"Castle Kelly"	4:39
16.	"Shamrock Shore"	3:11
17.	"The Gypsy Rover"	3:13
18.	"Bank and Star"	1:45
19.	"Texas"	2:41
20.	"Preacher on a Pony"	3:12
21.	"Go! Move! Shift! (The Moving-on Song)"	3:34
22.	"Jenny Pluck Pears"	2:39
23.	"New Polkas"	2:32
24.	"Lovely Joan"	2:30
