= 'Ajde Jano =

Serbian folk song

"'Ajde Jano" is a traditional Serbian wedding Folk song from Kosovska Mitrovica and Kosovska Kamenica.

== Lyrics (traditional) ==
Serbian Cyrillic

'Ајде Јано коло да играмо!
'Ајде Јано, 'ајде душо, коло да играмо,
'Ајде Јано, 'ајде душо, коло да играмо!

'Ајде Јано коња да продамо!
'Ајде Јано, 'ајде душо, коња да продамо,
'Ајде Јано, 'ајде душо, коња да продамо!

Да продамо, само да играмо!
Да продамо, Јано душо, само да играмо,
Да продамо, Јано душо, само да играмо!

'Ајде Јано кућу да продамо!
'Ајде Јано, 'ајде душо, кућу да продамо,
'Ајде Јано, 'ајде душо, кућу да продамо!

Да продамо само да играмо!
Да продамо, Јано душо, само да играмо,
Да продамо, Јано душо, само да играмо!

Serbian Latin

'Ajde Jano kolo da igramo!
'Ajde Jano, 'ajde dušo, kolo da igramo,
'Ajde Jano, 'ajde dušo, kolo da igramo!

'Ajde Jano konja da prodamo!
'Ajde Jano, 'ajde dušo, konja da prodamo,
'Ajde Jano, 'ajde dušo, konja da prodamo!

Da prodamo samo da igramo!
Da prodamo, Jano dušo, samo da igramo,
Da prodamo, Jano dušo, samo da igramo!

'Ajde Jano kuću da prodamo!
'Ajde Jano, 'ajde dušo, kuću da prodamo,
'Ajde Jano, 'ajde dušo, kuću da prodamo!

Da prodamo samo da igramo!
Da prodamo, Jano dušo, samo da igramo,
Da prodamo, Jano dušo, samo da igramo!

English

C'mon Jana, let's dance the kolo!
C'mon Jana, c'mon honey, let's dance the kolo,
C'mon Jana, c'mon honey, let's dance the kolo!

C'mon Jana, let's sell the horse!
C'mon Jana, c'mon honey, let's sell the horse,
C'mon Jana, c'mon honey, let's sell the horse!

For to sell it, just to dance!
For to sell it, Jana honey, just to dance,
For to sell it, Jana honey, just to dance!

C'mon Jana, let's sell the house!
C'mon Jana, c'mon honey, let's sell the house,
C'mon Jana, c'mon honey, let's sell the house!

For to sell it, just to dance!
For to sell it, Jana honey, just to dance,
For to sell it, Jana honey, just to dance!

== Lyrics (modern) ==
Serbian Latin

'Ajde Jano kolo da igramo
'Ajde Jano, 'ajde dušo, kolo da igramo
'Ajde Jano, 'ajde dušo, kolo da igramo.

'Ajde Jano borbu ostavimo
'Ajde Jano, 'ajde dušo, borbu ostavimo
'Ajde Jano, 'ajde dušo, borbu ostavimo.

Ajde Jano, puške napustimo
Ajde Jano, ajde dušo, puške napustimo
Ajde Jano, ajde dušo, puške napustimo.

Ajde Jano, sreću potražimo
Ajde Jano, ajde dušo sreću potražimo
Ajde Jano, ajde dušo sreću potražimo.

English

C'mon Jana, let's dance the kolo
C'mon Jana, c'mon honey, let's dance the kolo
C'mon Jana, c'mon honey, let's dance the kolo.

C'mon Jana, let's stop the fighting
C'mon Jana, c'mon honey, let's stop the fighting
C'mon Jana, let's stop the fighting.

C'mon Jana, let's put the guns away
C'mon Jana, c'mon honey, let's put the guns away
C'mon Jana, c'mon honey, let's put the guns away.

C'mon Jana, let's search for happiness
C'mon Jana, c'mon honey, let's search for happiness
C'mon Jana, c'mon honey, let's search for happiness.

== Recorded versions ==
- In 1960, Croatian and Yugoslav conductor Emil Cossetto and Joža Vlahović Choir and Orchestra released a version of the song on the album Pjesme naroda Jugoslavije.
- In 1960, Yugoslav folk singer Mara Đorđević released a version of the song on the various artists album Pesme i igre naroda Jugoslavije.
- In 1963, American traditional music ensemble Duquesne University Tamburitzans released a version of the song on the album Ballads of the Balkans.
- In 1974 the Polish song and dance ensemble "Slowianki" recorded "'Adje Jano" on their album Slowianki
- In 1976, Yugoslav folk rock band Bubamare released a version of the song on a 7-inch single.
- In 1977, Serbian and Yugoslav folk singer Zorica Brunclik released a version of the song on the album Aj, mene majka jednu ima.
- In 1990, Serbian and Yugoslav folk singer Vera Ivković released a version of the song on the album Mladost peva.
- In 1990, Serbian and Yugoslav folk singer Vasilija Radojčić released a version of the song on the album Na Uskrs sam se rodila.
- In 1994, Serbian folk band Legende released a version of the song on the album Uspomene.
- In 1994, Serbian and Yugoslav folk singer Dragica Radosavljević "Cakana" released a version of the song on the album Tri godine.
- In 1995, Yugoslav singer-songwriter Branimir "Džoni" Štulić released a version of the song on his album Anali.
- In 1996, American world music artist Talitha MacKenzie released a version of the song on the album Spiorad. In 2004, Slovenian DJ Jernej Grej released the EP Ajde Jano with three remixes of MacKenzie's version.
- In 1997, Serbian and Yugoslav folk singer Beba Tošić released a version of the song on the album Svu noć sam, majko....
- In 1998, Serbian ethnic music band Vlada Maričić & The Ritual Band released a version of the song on the album Ritual.
- In 1998, Swedish alternative rock band Urga released a version of the song on the album Etanol.
- In 1999, Serbian Balkan Brass Band Mića Petrović Trumpet Orchestra released a version of the song on the album Srcem za dušu.
- In 2000, Polish singer Paulina Bisztyga released a version of the song on the album Nie Ma Co Się Bać.
- In 2000, Polish jazz band Cracow Klezmer Band released a version of the song on the album De Profundis.
- In 2002, German screamo band Tristan Tzara recorded a version of the song on their album Da Ne Zaboravis.
- In 2003, British violinist Nigel Kennedy and Polish world music band Kroke released a version of the song on the collaborative album East Meets East. Their version featured guest appearance by Belgian world music singer Natacha Atlas.
- In 2004, Kroke released a version of the song on the live album Quartet – Live at Home.
- In 2004, Mića Petrović Trumpet Orchestra and Vera Ivković released a version of the song on the various artists album Kad jeknu dragačevske trube 2.
- In 2004, Serbian violinist Aleksandar Šišić released a version of the song on the album Magična violina.
- In 2004, Slovenian folk band Terrafolk released a version of the song on the album N'taka.
- In 2006, Polish jazz singer Edyta Geppert and Kroke released a version of the song on the collaborative album Śpiewam Życie.
- In 2006, Serbian pop singer Zorana Pavić released a cover of the song on the album Made in Serbia.
- In 2008, Serbian folk/world music band Balkan Music Club released a version of the song on the album Live in Belgrade 1999.
- In 2008, Serbian and Yugoslav rock/ethnic musician Asim Sarvan released a version of the song on the album Hajde, Jano, kuću da ne damo.
- In 2009, Czech world music band BraAgas released a version of the song on the album Tapas.
- In 2009, Belgian jazz band Turdus Philomelos released a version of the song on the album Ici Maintenant La Pouf!.
- In 2010, Polish world music band Dikanda released a version of the song on their album Live.
- In 2011, Serbian-born American pianist Koshanin released a version of the song on the album Over Seven Seas.
- In 2011, Canadian Balkan-Klezmer band The Lemon Bucket Orkestra included a version on their debut EP, Cheeky.
- In 2012, Polish folk band Samech released a version of the song on their album Quachatta.
- In 2012, Italian jazz/world music musician Daniele Sepe released a version of the song on the album Canzoniere Illustrato.
- In 2013, Polish singer-songwriter Kayah released a version of the song on the album Transoriental Orchestra.
- In 2026, Minnesota Celtic punk band Boiled in Lead covered the song on their album King of the Dogwoods.

== Notable live performances ==
- In 2010, American rock band Faith No More performed the song on their performance at the Exit Festival. The band performed the song once more in 2012, at the Belgrade Calling Festival.
- In 2014, Don Airey, keyboardist of the British hard rock band Deep Purple, performed an instrumental version of the song as a part of his keyboard solo on Deep Purple's concert in Belgrade. Airey performed a cover of the song as a part of his solo once again during the band's 2024 concert in Belgrade.
- In January 2013 on Orthodox Christian New year, Viva Vox, a Serbian pop/rock choir, performed an a cappella version of the song in front of the United Nations General Assembly.
- In October 2026, Professor Aleksandar Čupić sang an adapted version dedicated to young people, titled Hajde, grade, svi uz naše mlade. The song became a hit.
