= Adam Stemple =

American musician and writer

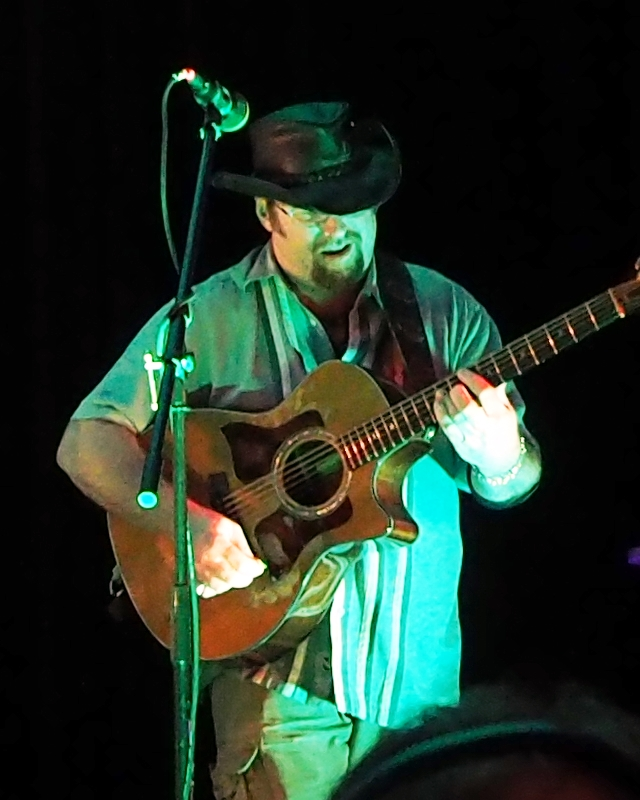
- Stemple at Cats Laughing reunion concert, April 2015

Background information
- Genres: Folk rock, Celtic music
- Occupations: Musician, writer
- Instruments: Guitar, vocals
- Years active: 1988–present
- Member of: Tim Malloys
- Formerly of: Cats Laughing, Boiled in Lead
- Website: www.adamstemple.com

Adam Stemple is a Celtic-influenced American folk rock musician, based in Minneapolis, Minnesota. He is also the author of several fantasy short stories and novels, including two series of novels co-written with his mother, writer Jane Yolen.

Stemple also wrote a Push-Fold chart for poker with poker player Chris Wallace.

== Music ==
Stemple played guitar and sang as a member of the folk rock "rock-and-reel" band Cats Laughing from 1988 to 1996. The band also included notable fantasy/science fiction authors Steven Brust and Emma Bull.

For twelve years, he was lead singer/guitarist for the band Boiled in Lead. Stemple first appeared on Boiled in Lead's 1994 album Antler Dance. He co-wrote nine songs with science fiction and fantasy author Steven Brust on the 1995 album Songs from The Gypsy, released as an enhanced CD. The CD has the distinction of including the full text of the novel The Gypsy, which Brust co-authored with Megan Lindholm and upon which the songs were based.

Stemple also produced and performed on Steven Brust's solo album A Rose for Iconoclastes.

Stemple currently is with the Tim Malloys, an Irish band. Like Cats Laughing and Boiled in Lead, Stemple's current group shares musical roots that incorporate Celtic and rock styles.

In April 2015, Stemple reunited with Cats Laughing in a concert at the Minicon science fiction convention. A live CD and DVD of the concert was released in late 2015.

== Fiction ==
Stemple's first novel, for Tor Books, was Singer of Souls. A sequel, Steward of Song, was published in 2008.

With his mother, Jane Yolen, Stemple has also co-authored two series of books — the Rock 'n Roll Fairy Tale series, and more recently, The Seelie Wars. The Rock 'n Roll Fairy Tale series began with Pay the Piper, published in 2005 by Tor. Pay the Piper was the winner of the 2006 Locus Award for Best Young Adult Book.

Stemple's short stories include a series of historical whodunnits set in feudal Japan, featuring a samurai master and apprentice as a sleuthing duo, for the historical fiction magazine Paradox.

Among Stemple's other published short stories, "A Piece of Flesh" was chosen as one of ten short stories included in The Year's Best SF and Fantasy for Teens (2005).

Stemple was among the members of a group of writers known as the Pre-Joycean Fellowship, which included his bandmates Emma Bull and Steven Brust.

== Discography ==
with Cats Laughing:

- Bootleg Issue (1988)
- Another Way to Travel (1990)
- A Long Time Gone (2015)

with Boiled in Lead:

- Antler Dance (1994)
- Songs from The Gypsy (1995)
- Alloy (1998, compilation)

== Bibliography ==
=== Novels ===
- Adam Stemple (2005). Singer of Souls. Tor Books. ISBN 0-7653-1170-4.
- Adam Stemple; Jane Yolen (2005). Pay the Piper: A Rock 'n' Roll Fairy Tale. Tor. ISBN 0-7653-1158-5.
- Adam Stemple; Jane Yolen (2006). Troll Bridge: A Rock 'n' Roll Fairy Tale. Starscape. ISBN 0-7653-1426-6.
- Adam Stemple (2008). Steward of Song. Tor. ISBN 978-0-7653-1630-1.
- Adam Stemple; Jane Yolen (2013). B.U.G. (Big Ugly Guy). Dutton Books for Young Readers. ISBN 978-0525422389.
- Adam Stemple; Jane Yolen (2013). The Hostage Prince (The Seelie Wars #1). Viking Books for Young Readers. ISBN 978-0670014347.
- Adam Stemple; Jane Yolen (2014). The Last Changeling (The Seelie Wars #2). Viking Books for Young Readers. ISBN 978-0670014354.

=== Selected short fiction ===
- "Robin Hood v1.5.3", in Jane Yolen, ed. (2002). Sherwood: Original Stories from the World of Robin Hood. Puffin. ISBN 978-0698119536.
- "The Three Truths" (Paradox, Issue 6, Winter 2004-2005)
- "Troubles" (with Jane Yolen), in Andrew M. Greeley, ed. (2005). Emerald Magic: Great Tales of Irish Fantasy. Tor Fantasy. ISBN 978-0765344236.
- "Kitsune" (Paradox, Issue 9, Summer 2006)
- "The Tsar's Dragons", in Jack Dann; Gardner Dozois, eds. (2009). The Dragon Book: Magical Tales from the Masters of Modern Fantasy. Ace Hardcover. ISBN 978-0441017645., illustrated by John Jude Palencar
- "Little Red" (with Jane Yolen), in Sharyn November, ed. (2009). Firebirds Soaring: An Anthology of Original Speculative Fiction. Firebird. ISBN 978-0142405529.
