= The Monster of Piedras Blancas =

- Theatrical release insert poster for the film's double feature release with Okefenokee
- Directed by: Irvin Berwick
- Screenplay by: H. Haile Chace
- Produced by: Jack Kevan
- Starring: Les Tremayne; Forrest Lewis; John Harmon; Pete Dunn; Jeanne Carmen
- Cinematography: Philip H. Lathrop
- Edited by: George A. Gittens
- Production company: Vanwick Productions
- Distributed by: Filmservice Distributors Corporation (United States); Grand National Pictures (United Kingdom)
- Release date: April 22, 1959 (United States)
- Running time: 71 minutes
- Country: United States
- Language: English
- Budget: $29,000

The Monster of Piedras Blancas is a 1959 American horror monster film. It was produced by Jack Kevan, directed by Irvin Berwick, and stars Jeanne Carmen, Les Tremayne, John Harmon, Don Sullivan, Forrest Lewis, and Pete Dunn. The film was released by Filmservice Distributors Corporation as a double feature with Okefenokee.

The Monster of Piedras Blancas was influenced by Creature from the Black Lagoon (1954). Kevan, who had supervised the manufacture of the Gill-man suit and worked on Mole People costumes at Universal-International, created the Piedras Blancas monster costume. Kevan employed several of his former Universal associates on the picture, including soundman Joe Lapis and prop master Eddie Keys.

== Plot ==
In the sleepy California town of Piedras Blancas, Sturges, the lighthouse keeper, is very superstitious and concerned for the safety of his teenage daughter, Lucy. He leaves food for a sea monster who lives in a nearby cave. The locals disregard his warnings at first, but they begin to take notice when the bodies of people killed by the creature are found on the beach. A local scientist identifies a scale found near one of the bodies as belonging to a "diplovertebron", a prehistoric amphibious reptile long presumed extinct.

== Cast ==
- Les Tremayne as Dr. Sam Jorgenson
- Forrest Lewis as Constable George Matson
- John Harmon as Sturges, the Lighthouse Keeper
- Frank Arvidson as Kochek, the Storekeeper
- Jeanne Carmen as Lucille Sturges
- Don Sullivan as Fred
- Pete Dunn as Eddie/the Monster
- Joseph La Cava as Mike
- Wayne Berwick as Little Jimmy

== Production ==
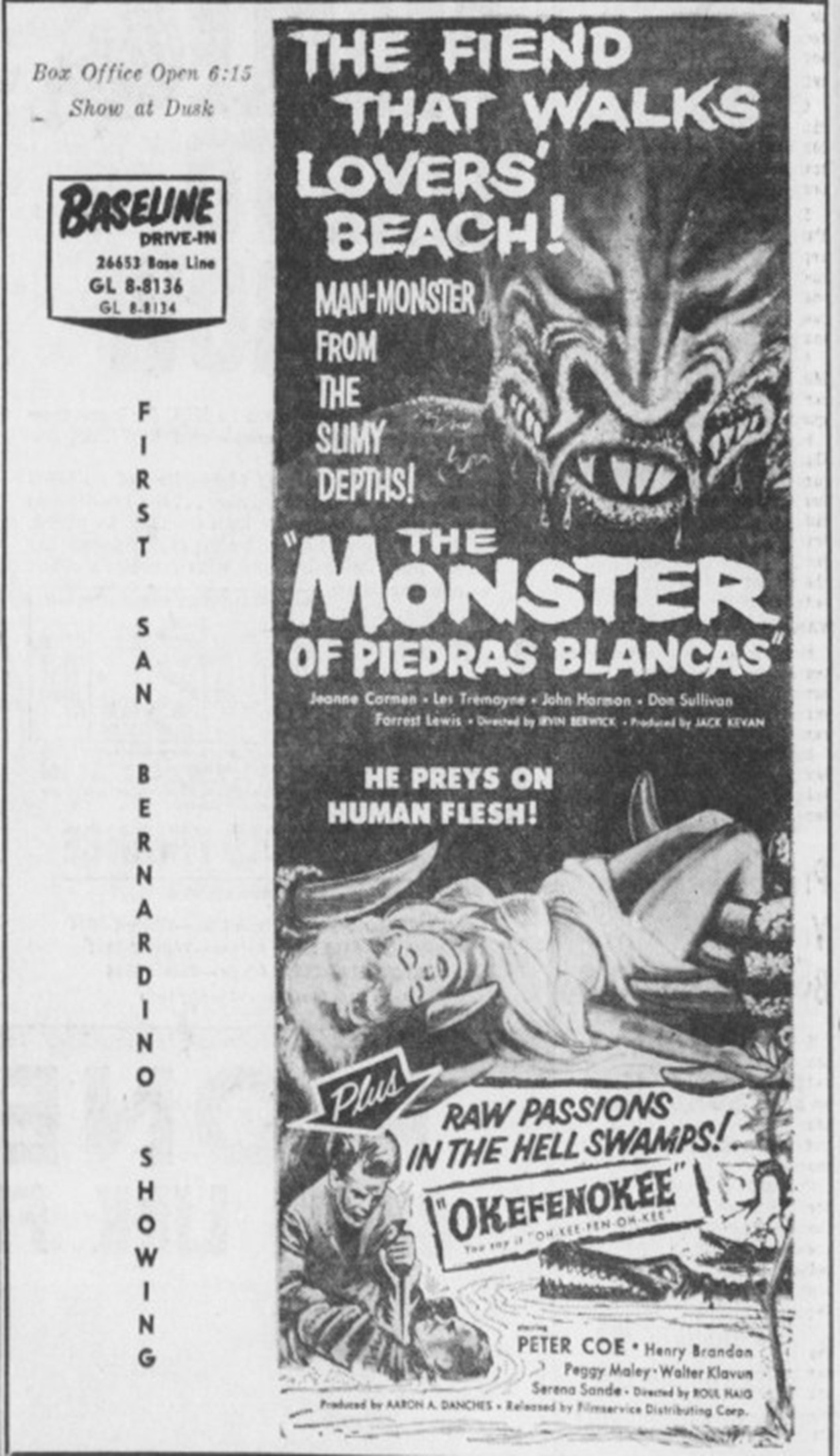
Drive-in advertisement from 1959.

Both Berwick and Kevan toiled in unbilled obscurity as contract employees at Universal-International. Berwick had been an uncredited dialogue director at U-I and at Columbia prior to that, working with the likes of William Castle and Jack Arnold. Kevan in particular chafed under the stewardship of Bud Westmore, the head of the studio's makeup department, who seldom allowed employees like Kevan or sculptors Chris Mueller and Millicent Patrick to receive publicity. Berwick and Kevan formed Vanwick Productions and became independent producers. The Monster of Piedras Blancas, their first film, was designed as a takeoff on U-I's popular Creature from the Black Lagoon, whose iconic monster suit Kevan had helped manufacture. For this film's fictional "diplovertebron", Kevan cut cost and labor time by using existing molds for the feet (cast from those of the Metaluna Mutant from This Island Earth) and the oversized hands (designed originally for The Mole People). Actor/stuntman Pete Dunn wore the green-hued monster suit in the film and did double-duty playing the bartender character. Parts of the rubber monster suit showed up years later in the TV show Flipper, in the episode "Flipper's Monster", which was directed by Ricou Browning, who had performed the Gill-man swimming scenes in Creature From the Black Lagoon. Universal gave a great deal of unofficial cooperation to the production, since it was going through a period of budget problems. Vanwick received sweetheart deals for production vehicles and equipment, the studio's way of helping many of its laid-off technicians who found work on the independent film. The film's end budget was $29,000.

Top-lined Sullivan would appear in a number of other genre films afterward, such as The Giant Gila Monster. This was the only lead role of B-movie actress and pin-up model Carmen, best known as a trick-shot golf "expert". Character actor Lewis was primarily known for his radio work, as was Tremayne. Wayne Berwick, who played "Little Jimmy", was the son of director Irvin Berwick and the godson of prolific actor Harmon.

The film was shot entirely on location, but oddly enough, not at the real Point Piedras Blancas, which is north of San Simeon on the California coast. The lighthouse locations were shot at the Point Conception lighthouse near Lompoc, and the film's town was actually the seaside city of Cayucos, about 30 miles south of the real Piedras Blancas.

Several scenes broke new ground for onscreen gore, such as the monster making a shock entrance carrying a bloody human head and a later shot of the same head with a crab crawling across the face.

== Release ==
=== Home media ===
The Monster of Piedras Blancas was released on VHS by Republic Pictures Home Video on January 1, 1998. It was released for the first time on DVD and Blu-ray on September 13, 2016, by Olive Films.

== Reception ==
The Monster of Piedras Blancas received mostly negative reviews from film critics upon its release, with many calling it "amateurish".

Author and film critic Leonard Maltin awarded the film one and a half out of four stars, calling the film "obvious and amateurish" while also criticizing its sluggish pacing. TV Guide rated it one out of four stars, stating that the film was "a distinctly subpar effort", with the monster's design being the film's only item of interest. In his book VideoHound's Golden Movie Retriever, Jim Craddock gave the film a "WOOF", the book's lowest rating. Craddock was critical of the film's acting and special effects, which he felt were poor and "amateurish". Dave Sindelar from Fantastic Movie Musings and Ramblings gave it a mixed review, complimenting the film's gory effects, soundtrack, and Sullivan and Tremayne's performances. However, he criticized the film's script, dialogue, and monster design.

AllMovie gave the film a positive review, calling it "a horror movie with a lot of familiar elements but just enough offbeat touches to keep viewers coming back for 50 years or more".

== In popular culture ==
The song "King of the Dogwoods," the title track of the 2026 album by Minnesota Celtic punk band Boiled in Lead, were inspired in part by a childhood viewing by vocalist Todd Menton of The Monster of Piedras Blancas.

== See also ==
- List of American films of 1959
- Creature from the Black Lagoon
