= From the Ladle to the Grave =

1989 album by Boiled in Lead

Studio album by Boiled in Lead
- Released: 1989
- Genre: Celtic rock/Celtic punk, folk punk, gypsy punk
- Label: Atomic Theory/Cooking Vinyl
- Producer: Willie Murphy and Boiled in Lead

Boiled in Lead chronology
Hotheads (1987)	From the Ladle to the Grave (1989)	Orb (1990)

Professional ratings
Review scores
Source	Rating
Allmusic	3/5 stars
Guinness Encyclopedia of Popular Music	4/4 stars
MusicHound Folk	4.5/5 stars
Chicago Tribune	3/4 stars
The Guardian	(positive)
Washington Post	(positive)
St. Paul Pioneer Press Dispatch	4/4 stars
Folk Roots	(positive)
Irish Voice	(positive)
New Musical Express	8/10 stars
Q	4/5 stars
Puncture Magazine	(positive)
Green Man Review	(positive)

From the Ladle to the Grave is the third album by Minneapolis folk punk band Boiled in Lead. It was the band's first recording with drummer Robin Adnan Anders, whose influence helped push the band further beyond Celtic rock into explorations of other world traditions. These included Bulgarian, Russian-Jewish, and Turkish music, as well as their version of The Hollies’ “Stop! Stop! Stop!” which interpolated a traditional Egyptian melody. The song "Cuz Mapfumo" simultaneously paid tribute to Chicago-based Irish musician Cuz Teahan and Zimbabwean Thomas Mapfumo.

Previous Boiled in Lead albums had consisted entirely of traditional folk songs, though the band often arranged the songs in nontraditional, harder-rocking ways. Ladle contained Boiled in Lead's first original compositions, "The Microorganism" and "Pig Dog Daddy." Both were written by lead singer Todd Menton, who cited the influence of Billy Bragg and Richard Thompson as songwriters who had successfully fused folk and rock/pop. Menton began writing "The Microorganism," a mournful ballad about the devastation of AIDS, six years before its appearance on Ladle.

The song "My Son John" is a variant of the traditional Irish antiwar ballad "Mrs. McGrath." In an article on the history of the Napoleon-era song, Sing Out! critic Steven L. Jones singled out Boiled in Lead's rendition as a skillful modernization that also stayed true to the song's politics and "underlying rage and terror." The band's version of the song is dedicated to antiwar activist S. Brian Willson, whose legs were cut off when he was struck by a munitions train during a Reagan-era protest of arms shipments to Central America.

The album won a Minnesota Music Award for Album/CD of the Year in 1989.

== Personnel ==
- Robin "Adnan" Anders: Trap kit, tambourine, cabasa, log drum, tapan, doumbek, sufi drum, davul, darabouka, tar, gong, def. chimes, beladi, Simmons,
- Todd Menton: Electric guitar, vocals, tin whistle, acoustic guitar, mandolin, whistle
- Drew Miller: Bass guitar, tuners, turntable
- David Stenshoel: Fiddle, electric mandolin, scat, zurna, saxophone

== Track listing ==
No.	Title	Writer(s)	Additional musicians	Length
1.	"The Pinch Of Snuff"			4:15
2.	"Madman Mora Blues"	John Van Orman	Susan Esbjornson: Backing vocals John Van Orman: Concertina, backing vocals	3:10
3.	"Cuz Mapfumo"	Arrangement of "Shumba" by Thomas Mapfumo and "All My Grandchildren" and "The Teahan" by Terence P. Teahan	Laura MacKenzie: Flute, tin whistle Celso Maldonado: Congas; Willie Murphy: Sequencer programming Steve Tibbetts: Electric guitar Marcus Wise: Tablas	4:54
4.	"Step It Out Mary"		Susan Esbjornson: Backing vocals John Van Orman: Hurdy-gurdy	3:17
5.	"Shopetski Kopanitsa"		Arlene Samsel: Accordion; Tim Wahl: Keval	5:23
6.	"The Microorganism"	Todd Menton	Mark Black: Propane-o-phone; Susan Esbjornson: Backing vocals John Van Orman: Hurdy-gurdy, backing vocals	3:15
7.	"Sher"			2:30
8.	"The Spanish Lady"			5:05
9.	"Dilley Delaney's/Cherish The Ladies"			3:20
10.	"Bahcevanci (O Ya)"		Rick O'Dell: Saxophone	3:24
11.	"Stop! Stop! Stop!"	Allan Clarke, Tony Hicks, Graham Nash	Jane Dauphin: Backing vocals Cassandra Shore: Stereo dance orientale	2:27
12.	"Pig Dog Daddy"	Todd Menton	Mark Black: hubcaps Susan Esbjornson: Backing vocals John Van Orman: backing vocals	1:26
13.	"The Guns Of The Magnificent Seven"	Fintan MacManus	Laura MacKenzie: Flute	3:06
14.	"My Son John"		Mark Black: Electric springs	5:07

== Credits ==
- Recorded on the winter solstice in 1987 at Blackberry Way, Minneapolis
- Produced by Boiled in Lead and Willie Murphy
- Engineered by Mike Owens and Kevin Glynn
- Mixed March–June 1988 at Scott Malchow Productions
- Graphics: Margaret McDermott
- Photos: Dan Corrigan
- Technical assistance: Bill Kubeczko
- Typeset by Luke McGuff at Great Faces, Inc.
