= Songs from The Gypsy =

1995 album by Boiled in Lead

Songs From the Gypsy

Studio album by Boiled in Lead
- Released: 1995
- Genres: Celtic rock/Celtic punk, folk punk, gypsy punk
- Label: Omnium Records
- Producer: Adam Stemple

Boiled in Lead chronology
Antler Dance (1994)	Songs From the Gypsy (1995)	Alloy (1998)

Professional ratings
Review scores
Source	Rating
Allmusic	2/5 stars
Guinness Encyclopedia of Popular Music	3/4 stars
MusicHound Folk	2/5 stars
Boston Phoenix	3/4 stars
Green Man Review	(positive)
National Public Radio	(positive)

Songs From the Gypsy is the sixth album by Minneapolis folk punk band Boiled in Lead, and its second with lead singer/guitarist Adam Stemple. The album is based on The Gypsy, written by fantasy novelists Steven Brust and Megan Lindholm several years prior to Boiled in Lead's recording. The songs were co-written by Brust and Stemple. Boiled in Lead's album is considered the soundtrack to the novel. Brust had previously co-written two songs on Boiled in Lead's 1994 album Antler Dance, and had released a 1993 solo album, A Rose for Iconoclastes.

Songs From the Gypsy was released on CD in an enhanced multimedia format including both Boiled in Lead's music and the full text of Brust and Lindholm's novel, as well as 80 short sound clips of songs referenced in the novel's text.

Musically, the album leaned more towards rock and blues than the worldbeat and folk Boiled in Lead had become known for. Bassist Drew Miller called the change in sound a temporary one related to the album's unusual genesis, since the songs had been written six years earlier, before Stemple had joined Boiled in Lead. "The Gypsy album "doesn't exactly represent us as we are now. It was a side project, actually. It's not indicative of the way the band is going," said Miller.

== Critical reception ==
Critical reception to the album was mixed. AllMusic reviewer Steven McDonald called Songs from The Gypsy "an example of Brust's serious songwriting working well", while Tim Walters of MusicHound Folk was critical, saying that while the band "performs admirably, Stemple'S writing isn't strong enough to pull off this song cycle." The Guinness Encyclopedia of Popular Music thought that the album confirmed Boiled in Lead's "willful lack of concern with commercial success" by moving away from the New Wave and folk influences heard on previous albums, which had attracted critical praise, in favor of a more acoustic sound. Green Man Review writer Robert M. Tilendis called the album "an absolute gem," praising its "strong narrative component." National Public Radio's Anne Williams was positive, saying that the album "maintains Boiled in Lead as one of the most innovative world beat bands today."

A critical review by AllMusic's Roch Parisien praised Brust's "engrossingly poetic, impressionist story" but called the album's technical aspect "a failure of multimedia integration," in that the novel's 17 chapters were presented as "scrollable text only, which also intersperse some 80 song lyric excerpts that you can play from hot buttons. Annoyingly, you must flip back to a main menu index to move from one chapter to the next." The review, written in 1995, predated a wave of popular e-book readers that began to emerge about ten years later.

== Track listing ==
No.	Title	Length
1.	"Raven, Owl, and I"	3:17
2.	"Leanan Sidhe"	3:48
3.	"Hide My Track"	4:04
4.	"No Passenger"	1:59
5.	"Back In Town"	3:38
6.	"Ugros (Springtime)"	6:17
7.	"The Gypsy"	8:08
8.	"Blackened Page"	4:56
9.	"The Fair Lady"	3:05
10.	"Red Lights and Neon"	4:13
