= Antler Dance =

1994 album by Boiled in Lead

Studio album by Boiled in Lead
- Released: 1994
- Genres: Celtic rock/Celtic punk, folk punk, gypsy punk
- Length: 58:20
- Label: Omnium Records

Boiled in Lead chronology
Orb (1990)	Antler Dance (1994)	Songs from The Gypsy (1995)

Professional ratings
Review scores
Source	Rating
Allmusic	4.5/5 stars
Guinness Encyclopedia of Popular Music	3/4 stars
MusicHound Folk	4/5 stars
Alternative Press	(positive)

Antler Dance is the fourth album by Minneapolis folk punk band Boiled in Lead. It was the band's first recording with vocalist/guitarist Adam Stemple, who replaced Todd Menton after his departure in 1992. Founding bassist Drew Miller has called this personnel change the most significant shift in the band's history. Fiddler Josef Kessler also replaced the departed David Stenshoel. Stemple's addition to the band led to a heavier, more heavy metal-influenced sound, as well as a strengthening of the band's ties to the science fiction and fantasy community. Two songs on Antler Dance were co-written by fantasy novelist and Stemple's Cats Laughing bandmate Steven Brust, and "Robin's Complaint" was written by Stemple's mother, novelist Jane Yolen. The album also includes covers of Boney M.'s "Rasputin" and Bruce Springsteen's "State Trooper", originally from his album Nebraska.

== Track listing ==
No.	Title	Composer	Length
1.	"Newry Highwayman"	Traditional	2:49
2.	"Pontiaka"	Josef Kessler/Traditional	3:58
3.	"Walk Through the Door"	Steven Brust/Adam Stemple	3:39
4.	"Sugarfoot Congress"	Traditional	4:19
5.	"Drowning"	Drew Miller	3:54
6.	"Robin's Complaint"	Jane Yolen/Robin Anders/Andrew Miller	2:42
7.	"Bring It Round"		3:21
8.	"Hook 'Em Cow"	Steven Brust/Boiled in Lead/Drew Miller/Traditional (This track was released as a single but it did not chart)	3:02
9.	"Rasputin"	Frank Farian/Fred Jay/Traditional	4:42
10.	"Neda Voda"	Traditional	5:42
11.	"Nasrudin"	Traditional	8:42
12.	"State Trooper"	Bruce Springsteen	11:25
