= King of the Dogwoods =

2026 album by Boiled in Lead

Studio album by Boiled in Lead
- Released: March 20, 2026
- Studio: Signaturetone Recording
- Genres: Celtic rock, Celtic punk, folk punk, gypsy punk
- Length: 42:53
- Label: Omnium Records
- Producer: Boiled In Lead

Boiled in Lead chronology
| The Well Below (2012) | King of the Dogwoods (2026) |

Professional ratings
Review scores
| Source | Rating |
|---|---|
| Post Punk Monk | 5/5 stars |
| Vinyl District | A− |

King of the Dogwoods is an album by Twin Cities-based folk punk band Boiled in Lead, released on March 20, 2026.

It is the group's eighth full-length studio album and its first work of all-new material in 14 years. The lineup of the band includes founding bassist Drew Miller, longtime vocalist and multi-instrumentalist Todd Menton, and two newer members, drummer Morris Engel and violinist/vocalist Haley Olson, who first performed together on Boiled in Lead's 2024 live album 40 Years of Rock 'n' Reel.

King of the Dogwoods was written and recorded over a two-year period starting in 2024. Its first single, "Je T’Aime Helena", was released on January 24, 2026. As is typical of the band, the album is made up by a majority of traditional songs from a wide range of cultures, including Irish, Bulgarian, Cajun, and Serbian, as well as two covers by more recent songwriters, John Van Orman's "Je T’aime, Helena" and Lal Waterson's "Winifer Odd." Menton also wrote two songs, the title track and "(I'll Sing You) Sail Away, Ladies." Olson, who replaces late violinist David Stenshoel, also takes lead vocal on "Winifer Odd" and "Adje Jano", which she sings in its original language, Serbian. The group's penchant for songs in unusual time signatures shows up in the Bulgarian tune "Bučimiš", which is in 15/16 meter. Menton's lyrics on title track “King of the Dogwoods” were inspired in part by a childhood viewing of the 1959 horror film The Monster of Piedras Blancas. The traditional song "Bold Lovell" is an American variation of the Irish folk song "Whiskey in the Jar", famously covered by both Metallica and Thin Lizzy.

The band also released three music videos via their official website, including a video for "King of the Dogwoods" by director Daniel Polsfuss, "Je T'aime Helena," and "Bold Lovell."

== Critical reception ==
Critical reception to the album was positive. The Vinyl District website gave the album an A− grade, writing that the album resists the cliches of world music and praising its wide range of styles. Music website Post Punk Monk gave the album five out of five stars, giving particular praise to the Celtic/zydeco song "Je T’aime, Helena", writing that it "absolutely crackles with vibrant hybrid vigor." John Apice of the website Americana Highways called King of the Dogwoods one of the best albums of 2026, writing that "there are instrumentals, jigs, and reels strewn into the fabric—all fiery, melodic, and driving. The momentum is decisive." Peter Lindblad of the website Ink19 wrote that the album was "dripping with authenticity, four-part harmonies flying over heavy churn and freewheeling energy. It’s a record that alternately burns like fire and turns as cold as a tomb." Rick Anderson of CD HotList called the album "outstanding", and was impressed by the band's range, tackling "everything from Irish jigs to tricky Balkan fiddle tunes and klezmer numbers."

== Track listing ==
King of the Dogwoods track listing
| No. | Title | Composer | Length |
|---|---|---|---|
| 1. | "The King of the Dogwoods" | Todd Menton | 3:25 |
| 2. | "Bučimiš" | Traditional, arranged by BiL | 2:07 |
| 3. | "Slip Jigs" | Traditional, arranged by BiL | 3:20 |
| 4. | "(I'll Sing You) Sail Away, Ladies" | Todd Menton | 4:42 |
| 5. | "Haley's Reels" | Traditional, arranged by BiL | 3:12 |
| 6. | "Je T'aime, Helena" | John C. Van Orman | 2:35 |
| 7. | "Winifer Odd" | Elaine Knight (Lal Waterson) | 2:48 |
| 8. | "Bold Lovell" | Traditional, arranged by BiL | 3:34 |
| 9. | "Keshenever Bulgar" | Traditional, arranged by BiL | 3:44 |
| 10. | "Adje Jano" | Traditional, arranged by BiL | 5:49 |
| 11. | "Fast Reels" | Traditional, arranged by BiL | 3:37 |
| 12. | "Love, Farewell" | Traditional, arranged by BiL | 4:00 |

== Credits ==
- Todd Menton: guitars, lead vocals, mandolin, whistle, bodhrán, vocals
- Drew Miller: bass guitar
- Morris Engel: drum kit
- Haley Olson: violin, vocals
- Produced by Boiled In Lead
- Recorded and mixed by Adam Tucker at Signaturetone Recording.
- Mastered by Greg Reierson, Rare Form Mastering
