= Hotheads =

1986 album by Boiled in Lead

Studio album by Boiled in Lead
- Released: 1986
- Genre: Celtic rock/Celtic punk, folk punk, gypsy punk
- Label: Atomic Theory Records

Boiled in Lead chronology
Boiled in Lead (1985)	Hotheads (1986)	From the Ladle to the Grave (1989)

Professional ratings
Review scores
Source	Rating
AllMusic	3/5 stars
Guinness Encyclopedia of Popular Music	3/4 stars
MusicHound Folk	4/5 stars
Twin Cities Reader	4.5/5 stars
Green Man Review	(positive)

Hotheads is the second album by Twin Cities-based alt-rock/world-music band Boiled in Lead. Like its predecessor BOiLeD iN lEaD, it is strongly centered on a blend of alt-rock and traditional Celtic folk, and has been called its "most roundly Celtic" album.

== Style ==
The album consists largely of traditional folk songs, plus a cover of Ewan MacColl's "Go! Move! Shift! (The Moving-on Song)", but the band's raucous, garage-rock approach to the material displayed a cross-genre sensibility, interpolating country and rockabilly into the mix, that would develop even further on later albums. The shift in sound was partially a consequence of the band's evolving lineup. Fiddle player Dave Stenshoel had replaced the departed Brian Fox, and Todd Menton now joined Jane Dauphin on lead vocals and guitar.

Menton's style lent itself to both traditional takes on folk songs, as on "The House-Husband's Lament," and what Chuck Lipsig of Green Man Review called "a very loud, raucous, and sometimes incomprehensible punk version" of "The Gypsy Rover", which even featured the sound of a circular saw. Bassist Drew Miller described Boiled in Lead's version as a conscious rejection of the folk-purist ethos: "We gave that song the beating it richly deserved, since it's such a hackneyed standard of the Irish pub circuit."

Hotheads and BOiLeD iN lEaD were later collected on 1991's Old Lead, with two previously unreleased tracks recorded during the Hotheads sessions.

== In other media ==
Both Boiled in Lead and the Hotheads album appear in Emma Bull's 1987 urban fantasy novel War for the Oaks; the band itself has a cameo as the opening act for the protagonists' climactic performance at Minneapolis nightclub First Avenue, while the album appears during a quieter moment earlier in the book, when the main character plays the record while having a conversation.

== Awards ==
The album won a Minnesota Music Award for Best Celtic/Bluegrass/Folk Album in 1987.

== Track listing ==
All tracks are written by Traditional, processed and arranged by Boiled in Lead, except "Go! Move! Shift!".

No.	Title	Writer(s)	Length
1.	"The Galtee Set"		2:35
2.	"House-Husband's Lament (Rockin' The Cradle)"		4:14
3.	"French Tunes"		2:44
4.	"Castle Kelly"		4:39
5.	"Shamrock Shore"		3:11
6.	"The Gypsy Rover"		3:13
7.	"Bank and Star"		1:45
8.	"Texas"		2:41
9.	"Preacher on a Pony"		3:12
10.	"Go! Move! Shift! (The Moving-on Song)"	Ewan MacColl	3:34
11.	"Jenny Pluck Pears"		2:39

== Credits ==
- Jane Dauphin: Guitar, vocals
- Mitch Griffin: Drums and percussion (also synthesizer on "The Galtee Set", electric guitar and EFX on "Gypsy Rover", piano on "The Bank and Star", keyboards on "Jenny Pluck Pears")
- Todd Menton: Guitar, vocals, tin whistle (also banjo on "French Tunes" and "Texas", saxophone on "Castle Kelly" and "Jenny Pluck Pears", celeste and keyboards on "Shamrock Shore", bodhran on "Preacher on a Pony")
- Drew Miller: Bass guitar (also keyboards on "French Tunes", synthesizer on "Preacher on a Pony", recorders and bass synth on "Jenny Pluck Pears")
- David Rockne Stenshoel: Fiddle, electric mandolin (also e-bow mandolin on "Shamrock Shore", wah-wah mandocaster on "Gypsy Rover", saxophone on "Jenny Pluck Pears")
- Laura MacKenzie: flute on "The Galtee Set" and "Preacher on a Pony"
- Magnatone Chorus: featured on "Gypsy Rover"

- Recorded August–October 1985 at Nicollet Studios, Minneapolis
- Produced and mixed by Amos Box for The Crack
- Engineered by Steve Fjelstad
- Mastered by Larry Nix at Ardent Studios, Memphis
- Art direction and illustration by Dan Picasso
- Type by Luke at Great Faces, Inc.
- Photo by Dan Corrigan
- Cover mechanical by Chris Schmid
