= Mrs. McGrath =

Irish folk song

Song
- Written: 1807–1814
- Published: 1876
- Genre: Folk song

"Mrs. McGrath" (also known as "Mrs. McGraw", "My Son Ted", "My Son John", and "The Sergeant and Mrs. McGrath") is an Irish folk song set during the Peninsular War of the early 19th century. The song tells the story of a woman whose son enters the British Army and returns seven years later having lost his legs to a cannonball while fighting against Napoleon presumably at the Battle of Fuentes de Oñoro (fought between 3 and 5 May 1811). The general theme of the song is one of opposition to war. Along with "Johnny I Hardly Knew Ye", it is one of the most graphic of all Irish folk songs that deal with sickness and injuries caused by warfare. Irish folk song collector Colm Ó Lochlainn described "Mrs. Grath" as "known to every true born citizen of Dublin". It was very popular among the Irish Volunteers in the years leading up to the 1916 Rising and has been recorded by many singers and folk groups.

== History ==
Although the song probably dates from the time of the Peninsular Wars between 1807 and 1814, the earliest written account of it in Ireland was in 1876. It is believed to have been popular with soldiers during the American Civil War (1861-1865). In the 1999 book titled "Sing us One Of The Old Songs" by Michael Kilgraff, it is noted that Ted Snow (Edward Parrot) wrote the song for the Mohawk Minestrels.

An archival recording was made in 1951 at the home of Seamus Ennis. In 1958, the song was recorded by Burl Ives on Songs of Ireland (Decca DL-8444) and by the Belafonte Folk Singers (RCA LPM-1760) under the name of "The Sergeant and Mrs. McGrath". It was also recorded by Tommy Makem on his 1961 album, Songs of Tommy Makem. Peg and Bobby Clancy performed it on their LP, As We Roved Out, in 1964. Peg Clancy Power also recorded a version of this song on her 1962 album ‘‘Down By The Glenside’’.The Clancy Brothers recorded the song on the 1966 album Isn't It Grand Boys under the title "My Son Ted". The Dubliners also recorded it on the 1965 EP In Person featuring Ronnie Drew, and later sang it to new lyrics, though keeping the tune of the original folk song, on the 1968 album Drinkin' and Courtin'. This latter version tells the story of a country boy who goes to college in Dublin but fails due to spending all his money and time on "women and drink". Pete Seeger also recorded it live for "Pete Seeger in Concert: I Can See a New Day" (CBS, 1964).

Bruce Springsteen recorded a version of the song on his 2006 album, We Shall Overcome: The Seeger Sessions. Performed frequently on the subsequent Sessions Band Tour, this incarnation was included on the 2007 Bruce Springsteen with The Sessions Band: Live in Dublin audio and video release. Springsteen changed the traditional lyrics slightly. In the original song, Mrs. McGrath would rather have her "son as he used to be than the King of France and his whole navy." In Springsteen's version, this is changed to "King of America."

Fiddler's Green recorded the song with slightly different lyrics for their 2009 album Sports Day at Killaloe. The Stanfields also recorded the song with modified lyrics for their 2012 album Death & Taxes.

German Folk Metal Band Suidakra recorded the song as a Bonus Track for their 2013 album "Eternal Defiance". The version was sung by female singer Tina Stabel.

Another version of the song tells the same story about a boy called John. The text of this version is much shorter. The "My Son John" version of the song has been recorded by several different artists, including Martin Carthy with The Imagined Village, Tim Hart and Maddy Prior of Steeleye Span, Lew Bear, and actor John C. Reilly. Of these, critic Steven L. Jones singled out Minneapolis group Boiled in Lead's rendition, from their 1989 album From the Ladle to the Grave as a skillful modernization that also stayed true to the song's politics and "underlying rage and terror."

Being a well-documented song publicised by Mudcat, and Mainly Norfolk, the song was recorded by Jon Boden and Oli Steadman for inclusion in their respective lists of daily folk songs "A Folk Song a Day" and "365 Days Of Folk".

== See also ==
- Five Folk Songs for Soprano and Band
- List of anti-war songs
