= Paradox (magazine) =

American literary magazine

The cover of Paradox issue 5 (Summer 2004)

Paradox: The Magazine of Historical and Speculative Fiction (also known as Paradox Magazine or simply Paradox) was a literary magazine featuring original short historical fiction in all of its forms up to novella length. This includes mainstream historical fiction as well as other genre fiction with historical themes. For example, works of alternate history, historical whodunnits, historical fantasy, period horror, time travel, Arthurian legend and retold myth regularly appear in its pages. The magazine also features original historical poetry, reviews of historical novels and films, and interviews with notable historical novelists.

== History and profile ==
Paradox was initially published quarterly, from April 2003 through January 2004. It was then switched to a semiannual release schedule. Although Paradox is a print magazine, the editor experimented with publishing a bonus online issue in January 2004. On May 12, 2009, with the release of the thirteenth issue, the editor announced that Paradox would be ceasing publication as a print magazine; future book anthologies through Paradox Publications are planned, and the possibility exists that the magazine might return in an online format.

One distinctive aesthetic feature of the magazine is its use of historical artwork. In addition to using newly commissioned art for a story's accompanying illustration, stories are frequently illustrated by being matched with appropriate paintings or photographs by artists past. Vintage photographic portraits and U.S. Civil War and World War I photographs have been so employed in Paradox as have paintings by such artists as Sir Lawrence Alma-Tadema, George Bellows, William Bouguereau, Chǒng Sǒn, Gustave Doré, Rudolf Ernst, M. C. Escher, Jean-Léon Gérôme, John William Godward, Francisco Goya, David Roberts, Henri de Toulouse-Lautrec, J. M. W. Turner, Vincent van Gogh, George Frederick Watts, and Wu Guxiang, among many others.

Two stories published in 2006 in Paradox were among the seven short-form finalists for the 2006 Sidewise Award for Alternate History—"O, Pioneer" by Maya Kaathryn Bohnhoff and "The Meteor of the War" by Andrew Tisbert. One story published in 2008 was recommended for a Nebula Award: "Tucker Teaches the Clockies to Copulate" by David Erik Nelson.

"The Wizard of Macatawa" by Tom Doyle, published in Paradox issue 11 (Autumn 2007), was the winner of the 2008 WSFA Small Press Award.

== Editor ==
Christopher M. Cevasco, editor/publisher, 2003 to present

== Published authors ==
The cover of Paradox issue 6 (Winter 2004-2005)

Paradox published fiction and poetry by both new authors and established professionals. Noted contributors have included:

- Cherith Baldry
- Maya Kaathryn Bohnhoff
- Marie Brennan
- Brenda Clough
- Jeff Crook
- Paul Finch
- Charles Coleman Finlay
- Eugie Foster
- Sarah Hoyt
- Sarah Monette
- Richard Mueller
- Darrell Schweitzer
- Brian Stableford
- Adam Stemple
- Sonya Taaffe
- Steve Rasnic Tem
- James Van Pelt
- Carrie Vaughn
- Jack Whyte
- Jane Yolen

== Authors interviewed ==
Interviews with historical novelists and writers, conducted by the editor of Paradox, were regularly featured in the magazine. Noted authors interviewed have included:

- Piers Anthony
- Kevin Baker
- Bernard Cornwell
- Karen Essex
- Lois Tilton
- Connie Willis

== ISSN ==
Registered as ISSN 1548-0593 with the United States Library of Congress.
