= John Harmon (actor) =

American actor (1905–1985)

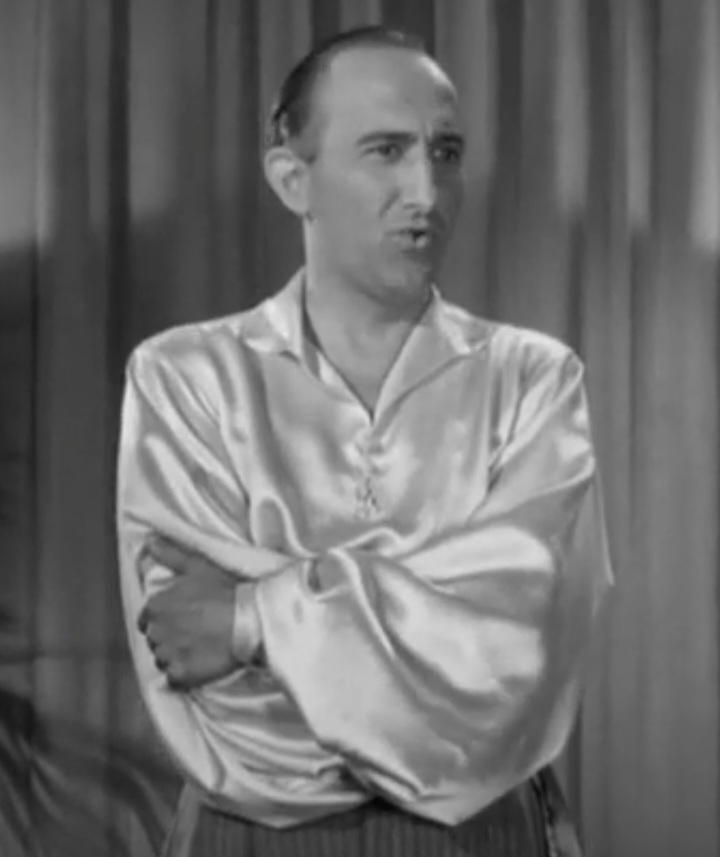
- Harmon in Dangerous Money (1946)
- Born: June 30, 1905; Ritzville, Washington, U.S.
- Died: August 6, 1985 (aged 80); Los Angeles, California, U.S.
- Occupation: Actor
- Years active: 1935–1985

John Harmon (June 30, 1905 – August 6, 1985) was an American character actor. He was a very prolific bit actor. His career spanned over six decades and almost 300 movie and television roles in a wide variety of genres.

Many of Harmon earlier appearances are uncredited. His first major screen credit was in I Was Framed (1942). His movie career highlights were roles in Gallant Bess, The Monster of Piedras Blancas, Live Fast, Die Young and The Street is my Beat. The movie in which he made his last screen appearance, The Naked Monster, was released in 2005, twenty years after his death.

Harmon's most notable TV roles were in Bonanza, The Twilight Zone, Perry Mason (as a police fingerprint/ballistics expert), Star Trek (in the episodes "The City on the Edge of Forever" and "A Piece of The Action"), The Rifleman (as the hotel clerk Eddie Halstead) and Gunsmoke (again as a hotel clerk in S1E15's “Gold Mine” & as town judge in S7E24’s “Coventry”). He also made several appearances as various criminals in Adventures of Superman.

In his later years, Harmon became a used books dealer in Los Angeles. He collected first editions of Mark Twain. He suffered a stroke about a year before he died from heart failure.

== Selected filmography ==
- The Missing Guest (1938) as Baldrich's Guard
- King of the Underworld (1939) as Slats
- The Shepherd of the Hills (1941) as Revenue Agent
- I Was Framed (1942) as Clubby Blake
- Tramp, Tramp, Tramp (1942) as Mousey
- Find the Blackmailer (1943) as Ray Hickey
- Louisiana (1947) as Steve
- Monsieur Verdoux (1947) as Joe Darwin
- Whiplash (1948) as Kid McKee (uncredited)
- Homicide (1949) as Pete Kimmel
- Tangier Incident (1953) as Tony
- Run for the Hills (1953) as Jed Taylor
- Jack Slade (1953) as Hollis
- Alfred Hitchcock Presents (1956) (Episode: "Help Wanted") as Donations Collector
- Alfred Hitchcock Presents (1959) (Episode: "Your Witness") as Al Carmody
- The Monster of Piedras Blancas (1959) as Sturges, the lighthouse keeper
- The Twilight Zone (1963) (Episode: "Of Late I Think of Cliffordville") as Clark
- Texas Across the River (1966) as Gabe
- Funny Girl (1968) as Company Manager
- Hitch Hike to Hell (1977) as Mr. Baldwin
- Malibu High (1979) as Mr. Elmhurst
- Microwave Massacre (1979) as Dr. Gestalp
