= Bernard Gilmore =

American composer, conductor, and music professor

Bernard Howard Gilmore (November 19, 1937 – April 17, 2013) was an American composer, conductor, French horn player, and Professor Emeritus of music at the University of California, Irvine. He is best known for his compositions, including Five Folk Songs for Soprano and Band which has become a reputable work in contemporary band music repertoire.

== Life ==
Dr. Bernard Gilmore was born in Oakland, California and, shortly thereafter, raised in southern California by his parents Bernard Gilmore Sr. and Rose (Virginia) Gilmore née Vineburg. He has one older sister named Caroline. Gilmore attended Van Nuys Junior High and High School, at which time began to play the French horn and become active in both solo and ensemble performance. Gilmore was in numerous honor groups, including the California Junior Symphony Orchestra directed by Peter Merenblum. He studied the French horn under instructors Fred Fox and Sinclair Lott and was a member of the Los Angeles Horn Club. Gilmore received his B.A and M.A. in composition from UCLA, and his D.M.A. in conducting from Stanford University. In 1959, he married pianist Phyllis Sandra Markin, who would eventually contribute to many performances of his solo piano works. Gilmore performed in Bruckner's Symphony No. 7 with the Los Angeles Philharmonic, conducted by Eduard van Beinum and under Georg Solti in a performance of Stravinsky's Sacre du Printemps, as well as with the Boston Pops Tour Orchestra on a ten-week tour of the United States. As a professor, he taught at Cornell University and Oregon State University before finally joining the faculty of UCI in 1982. Gilmore retired in 2006 and died while living in Irvine, California after long suffering from Alzheimer's disease. He is particularly remembered for his dedication to working with students, both as a conductor and classroom instructor.

=== Composition ===
Bernard Gilmore began composing at age 24 and continued to write while on faculty at Cornell University. In 1961, he completed his first major work: Four Poems of Dylan Thomas for tenor and orchestra. Shortly after, Gilmore moved to teach at Oregon State University where he continued to compose music such as Three Little Madrigals (1969) and Symphonic Movement for orchestra (1971). While teaching at UCI, he composed the majority of his works in addition to being the orchestra director, instructor of low brass (French horn, trombone, tuba), instructor of music theory, orchestration, composition, and music literature-history. In 1982, Gilmore accepted a position as Visiting Assistant Professor of Music at UCI, where he spent the remainder of his educational career. Bird of Time (1983) is a work for violin and orchestra, written for violinist Zina Schiff, and premiered with the Irvine Symphony Orchestra conducted by Gilmore on October 4, 1983. It was performed later that year in New York at the Abraham Goodman House in an arrangement for violin and piano. In 1986, when the International Chamber Consort commissioned a work for its 1986-87 European concert tour, Gilmore created Concertino for trumpet, xylophone, and orchestra (1986), intended to be performed by the Duisburg Symphony Orchestra as part of a festival of American music in the cities of Aachen and Düsseldorf. Later that year, he went on sabbatical to Netanya, Israel, where he composed a one-act opera, Lord Byron's Love Letter (1986). In 1998, he was commissioned by the University of Wisconsin to compose a piece for their symphonic band's tour of the British Isles. Gilmore's Isles Tryptych was the featured work for this tour. Three Miniatures for Violin and Piano was written for faculty members Haroutune Bedelian and Lorna Griffitt in 1992 and subsequently recorded by this duo. Coffee Date, a one-act comic opera was presented at UCI in 1998 with vocalists and piano, and was later performed with vocalists and chamber orchestra in 2003. Breed Street (2007), a work for orchestra evoking the spirit of the Breed Street Synagogue in Los Angeles, was his last piece written at UCI, and was performed by the UCI Orchestra conducted by Stephen Tucker in 2006, shortly before Gilmore retired. An accumulation of many of his compositions were performed for his retirement concert, "A tribute to Bernard Gilmore", given that same year at UCI. It included numerous chamber and solo works written for UCI students and faculty, including Two Songs from Torah, sung by Awet Andemicael who originally commissioned the compositions for her Masters Recital in 1999. At that same concert Pianojazz (1990), a large-scale jazz-influenced work for solo piano, was performed by UCI faculty jazz pianist Kei Akagi. Gilmore's compositions influenced the work of other composers including Mark Riley, Jason Barabba, Timothy Melbinger, Kendra d’Ercole, Maxim Vladimiroff, and Darren Wilsey.

== Style ==
Bernard Gilmore's composition style changed significantly throughout the duration of his life. His earlier works, notably the Five Folk Songs for soprano and wind band, are historically themed and utilize a strong sense of melodic foundation. His later works are genuinely innovative in the scheme of modern music, exploring the vast realm of harmonic chromaticism and atonality. However, even in his later works, such as Coffee Date, he retains the purity of the melody, both in lyric text and instrumentation. Gilmore uses both original and published texts to bind his works together in the most creative manner. His close working with students helped adapt his style for each performer.

== Five Folk Songs ==
Gilmore's signature piece, Five Folk Songs for Soprano and Band, is a [folk song] arrangement composed in 1963 for the annual conference of the College Band Directors National Association (CBDNA) and published by Maecenas Music, has enjoyed countless performances nationwide and internationally. This composition is the first major work written expressly for soprano and band and was awarded "Best Original Composition" at the CBDNA Biennial Conference in 1967.

Five Folk Songs for Soprano and Band contains five movements, each of which is in a different language. The complexity of the soprano having to learn a variety of languages can make the work difficult to learn. Nevertheless, the piece has been widely adopted as standard music repertoire in the university setting.

== Works ==
Gilmore's original works are located at the UCI Special Collections and Archives.

=== Orchestral music ===
- Four Poems of Dylan Thomas for tenor and orchestra (1961)
- Sons Coming, Sons Gone for orchestra and vocal (1966)
- Figures in a Square (1967)
- Three Poems of Love for chorus and chamber orchestra (1970)
- Symphonic Movement for orchestra (1971)
- Piper at the Gates of Dawn for chamber orchestra (1973)
- Memorial Music for orchestra (1974)
- God's Chosen for orchestra, vocalist, and choir (1981)
- Bird of Time for orchestra and violin (1984)
- Lord Byron's Love Letter for orchestra and three vocalists (1986)
- Requiem, Summer 1995 for soprano and chamber ensemble (1995)
- Pastorale for orchestra (1997)
- Breed Street (2006)

=== Chamber music ===
- Duo for flute and viola (1969); Seesaw Music
- Three Little Madrigals for two sopranos, two altos, flute, clarinet, horn, piano (1969)
- Dover Beach for soprano, clarinet, and string trio (1971)
- Two Songs for the End of the World for tenor and eight horns (1979)
- Ozymandias for chamber ensemble (1984)
- Suite for viola and percussion (1985)
- Concertino for trumpet, xylophone, and orchestra (1986)
- Ha Nahash Arum (The Cunning Serpent) for narrator, baritone, and chamber ensemble (1987)
- Two Impressions for brass quintet (ca. 1990s)
- Brass Quintet for two trumpets, horn, trombone, and bass trombone (1990)
- Jazz Idioms for woodwind quintet (1990)
- Dedication Fanfare for two trumpets and two trombones (1991)
- Colloquies for flute and clarinet (1993)
- Piper at the Gates of Dawn for wind quintet (1993)
- Songs of Solitude for clarinet, violin-viola, soprano, and piano (1994)
- Swing Sets for instrumental sextet (1996)
- Colloquies for alto flute and English horn (1999)
- Colloquies II for Bassoon and Cello (2002)
- Coffee Date for two sopranos, baritone, and chamber orchestra (2003)

=== Solo instrumental music ===
- Five Pieces for piano (1973)
- Bird of Time for violin and piano (1983)
- Dialogues for violin and piano (ca. 1990s)
- La Folia for solo violin (1990)
- Piano Jazz for piano (1990)
- Three Miniatures for violin and piano (1992)
- Crossroads for piano (2004)

=== Vocal music ===
- Two Songs from Torah for soprano and piano (1994)
- Coffee Date for two sopranos, baritone, and piano (1998)

=== Band music ===
- Five Folk Songs for soprano and band (1963); Maecenas Music
- Fantasy-Variations on the St. Anthony Chorale for wind band (1992)
- Isle's Triptych for symphonic band (1998)
- Distant Sundays for symphonic band (1999)

=== Arrangements ===
- New York's My home for SATB (1957)
- Let's Call the Whole Thing Off for SATB (1958)
- West Side Story (Dance Prologue) for band (1962)

=== Missing ===
- Music for the Dance (unknown)
- Night Music (unknown)
- Scarlatti Doesn't Live Here (unknown)

== See also ==
- Five Folk Songs for Soprano and Band
- List of compositions for viola: F to H
