= A Rose for Iconoclastes =

Studio album by Steven Brust
- Released: 1993
- Genre: Folk pop
- Length: 47:18
- Label: Beer & Pizza, Inc.
- Producer: Adam Stemple

A Rose for Iconoclastes is a folk album by drummer Steven Brust, an author of fantasy and science fiction novels and a member of the Minneapolis-based band Cats Laughing.

It is Brust's only solo album, released in 1993. The album was produced by Adam Stemple, a fellow fantasy writer and member of Cats Laughing. Twelve of the album's fourteen songs were written or co-written by Brust.

The album's title is a reference to "A Rose for Ecclesiastes", a short story by Brust's literary hero and mentor Roger Zelazny.

Two songs from this album, "I Was Born About Ten Million Songs Ago" and "Backward Message," were featured by Doctor Demento on his syndicated program, receiving radio airplay on shows from 1994 through 2009. "I Was Born About Ten Million Songs Ago" also appeared on an anthology, Dr. Demento's Basement Tapes #3, later part of a limited-edition CD boxed set.

== Critical reception ==
Professional ratings
Review scores
Source	Rating
AllMusic	3/5 stars

AllMusic reviewer Steven McDonald wrote, "Brust serves up a decent folksy stew with a few blasts of sarcastic humor, salted with performances from a handful of well-known friends." According to McDonald, "the writing tends to be stronger in the lyrical department than in the compositional area," and Brust's "satirical material tends to work better than the more serious material."

== Track listing ==
Track listing
No.	Title	Writer(s)	Length
1.	"Marion"	Steven Brust	3:37
2.	"I Was Born About Ten Million Songs Ago"	Steven Brust, lyrics by Nate Bucklin	3:01
3.	"Till My Baby Comes Home"	Adam Stemple, Jay Koelsch, & Steven Brust	3:41
4.	"Backward Message"	Steven Brust	2:57
5.	"Brother and Sister"	Steven Brust & Lorraine Garland	1:53
6.	"Neil Gaiman Pastiche #27"	Steven Brust	3:08
7.	"If I Should Happen to Leave"	Nate Bucklin & Steven Brust	2:49
8.	"She's Gone"	Adam Stemple & Steven Brust	4:04
9.	"War Is Bad"	Steven Brust	2:08
10.	"Stream of Consciousness Blues"	Adam Stemple	1:42
11.	"Drift"	Steven Brust	2:42
12.	"Little Beggarman"	Traditional	2:12
13.	"Latex Man"	Steven Brust	3:55
14.	"The Visit"	Steven Brust	9:29
