= Five Folk Songs for Soprano and Band =

Five Folk Songs for Soprano and Band is a folk song arrangement composed in 1963 by American composer Bernard Gilmore.

== History ==
Written in 1963 for the annual conference of the College Band Directors National Association (CBDNA) and published by Maecenas Music, Gilmore's Five Folk Songs for Soprano and Band has enjoyed countless performances nationwide and internationally. This composition is the first major work written expressly for soprano and band and was awarded "Best Original Composition" at the CBDNA Biennial Conference in 1967. It has been commercially recorded by the Cincinnati College Conservatory of Music Wind Symphony, conducted by Eugene Corporon. In 2007, it was performed by the Southern Illinois University Carbondale Wind Ensemble, both on the SIUC campus and at Carnegie Hall under the direction of Christopher Morehouse. The work was also arranged for soprano and orchestra and performed in San Diego in 2008 under the direction of David Amos.

== Music ==
This polyglot amalgam actually has roots in the Medieval era when composers would sometimes combine texts of two or more languages in the same motet. But the use of a multilingual text did not find its way into the mainstream of 19th or 20th century music, and it certainly imbues the Five Folk Songs with a maverick spirit. Each movement features a wide variety of instrumentation and stylistic character. The bouncy opening Irish tune, "Mrs. McGrath," is an ironic commentary on the horrors of war, embellished with a pentatonic flavor. "All the Pretty Little Horses" is a lullaby featuring a solo clarinet. "Yerakina" suggests a traditional Greek dance through the usage of slow, rhythmic ostinato and tonic pedal. "El Burro" depicts the tragic death of an animal important to a village through a mournful and processional dirge. The final movement, "A Fidler," Gilmore's work is a humorous and playful Yiddish tune depicting a young musician's first violin lesson and his mother's dream of him becoming a great virtuoso.

According to the program notes in the conductor's score, "it was inspired by folk recordings of Theodore Bikel and groups like The Limelighters." To prevent the voice from being overpowered by the band, much of the craft of Gilmore's work lies in his judicious balance of voice and instruments. Rarely are all musicians performing at once, yet there is sufficient variety of dynamics and textures to create interest. The light construction of the piece allows for the use of solos to emulate a character rarely heard in traditional wind band music. For example, the 2nd Movement features a nearly two-minute long improvisatory cadenza for clarinet alone which lends a nostalgic quality.

The work contains five movements, each of which is in a different language:

1. Mrs. McGrath (Irish)
2. All the Pretty Little Horses (American)
3. Yerakina (Greek)
4. El Burro (Spanish)
5. A Fidler (Yiddish)

== Lyrics ==
Each of the movements are based on popular folk poems originating from different countries. The first two movements are as they appear in the musical score. The last three movements are English translations of the original texts. The soprano sings each folk song in its vernacular language, as notated in the published score.

=== Mrs. McGrath ===
"Oh, Mrs. McGrath," the sargeant said,
"Would you like to make a soldier out of your son, Ted
with a scarlet coat and a big cocked hat,
Oh, Mrs. McGrath, wouldn't you like that?"

Wid yer too-ri-ah, fol-a-diddle-ah,
too-ri-oo-ri-oo-ri-ah,
wid yer too-ri-ah, fol-a-diddle-ah,
too-ri-oo-ri-oo-ri-ah.

Now, Mrs. McGrath lived on the shore
for the space of seven long years or more.
Till she saw a ship sailing into the bay
"Here's my son Ted would ya clear the way?"

(chorus)

"Oh captain dear, where have you been
have you been sailing on the Mediter-e-an.
Oh have you any tidings of my son Ted,
is the poor boy living or is he dead?"

(chorus)

Then up came Ted without any legs
and in their place, he has two wooden pegs.
She kiss'd him a thousand times or more,
saying "Mother of God-it isn't you."

(chorus)

"Oh were ye drunk or were ye blind
that ye left your two fine legs behind.
Or was it walking upon the sea
wore your fine legs from the knees away?"

"Oh I wasn't drunk and I wasn't blind
but I left my two fine legs behind.
For a cannon ball on the fifth of May
took my two legs from the knees away."

"All foreign wars I do proclaim
between Don John and the King of Spain.
For I'd rather my Ted as he used to be
than the King of France and his whole navee."

=== All the Pretty Little Horses ===
Hush-a-bye, don't you cry,
go to sleepy little baby.
When you wake you shall have cake
and all the pretty little horses.

Black and bays, dapples and greys,
coach and six o' little horses.
Blacks and bays, dapples and greys,
all the pretty little horses.

Hush-a-bye, don't you cry,
go to sleepy little baby.
Your pa's away, gone astray,
gone and left you little lambie

Daddy's eye is runnin' dry,
he can't cry for you like mammy.
Daddy's eye is runnin' dry,
gone and left you little lambie.

=== Yerakina ===
Yerakina went out to get water,
to get cold water.
Druga, druna, drun, drun, drun.
Her bracelets rattle, her bracelets rattle.
Druga, druga, druna, drun, drun, drun.

And she fell into the water well,
and she gave a big yell!
Druga, druna, drun, drun, drun.
Her bracelets rattle, her bracelets rattle.
Druga, druga, druna, drun, drun, drun.

Yerakina, I shall pull you out,
and I shall take you as my wife.
Druga, druna, drun, drun, drun.
Her bracelets rattle, her bracelets rattle.
Druga, druga, druna, drun, drun, drun.

=== El Burro ===
The donkey that used to carry the vinegar just died,
and the Lord has taken him from his miserable life.
Que tu ru ru ru ru...

He was valiant, and he was black,
he was the comfort of all the village.
Que tu ru ru ru ru...

He straightens his little hoofs, and opened his wide mouth,
and with his tail firmly behind him, he said "goodbye" to everyone.
Que tu ru ru ru ru...

All the neighbors went to the funeral,
and aunt Maria played the cattle-bell.
Que tu ru ru ru ru...

The donkey that used to carry the vinegar just died,
and the Lord has taken him from his miserable life.
Que tu ru ru ru ru...

=== A Fidler ===
So as the father from Yaridl,
I have bought a new fiddle.
Do, re, mi, fa, sol, la, si,
I now play didl, di, di, di.

Hold the head down,
and let your eyes shine.
Do, re, mi, fa, sol, la, si,
I now play didl, di, di, di.

Right foot forward a little,
Tap the floor with the little foot.
Do, re, mi, fa, sol, la, si,
I now play didl, di, di, di.

Mother is chortled and filled with wonder,
Jascha Heiifetz grows by me!
Do, re, mi, fa, sol, la, si,
I now play didl, di, di, di.

== Media ==
- Cornell University Wind Ensembe, CBDNA meeting (ca. 1965), Magnetic Tape Reel; Archive only
- Cornell University Wind Ensemble #29, Marice Stith (March 22, 1981) KM 6945; Archive only
- Songs & Dances, Cincinnati College Conservatory of Music Wind Symphony, Eugene Corporon (November 20, 1995) ASIN: B000003M5U
- SIUC Wind Ensemble, Carnegie Hall (March 26, 2008); Archive only
- Posy and Prunty, Marc R. Dickey (May 8, 2009) CSUF Department of Music; Archive only

== See also ==
- Bernard Gilmore
- Mrs. McGrath
- All the Pretty Horses (lullaby)
