= Seventeen Come Sunday =

English folk song

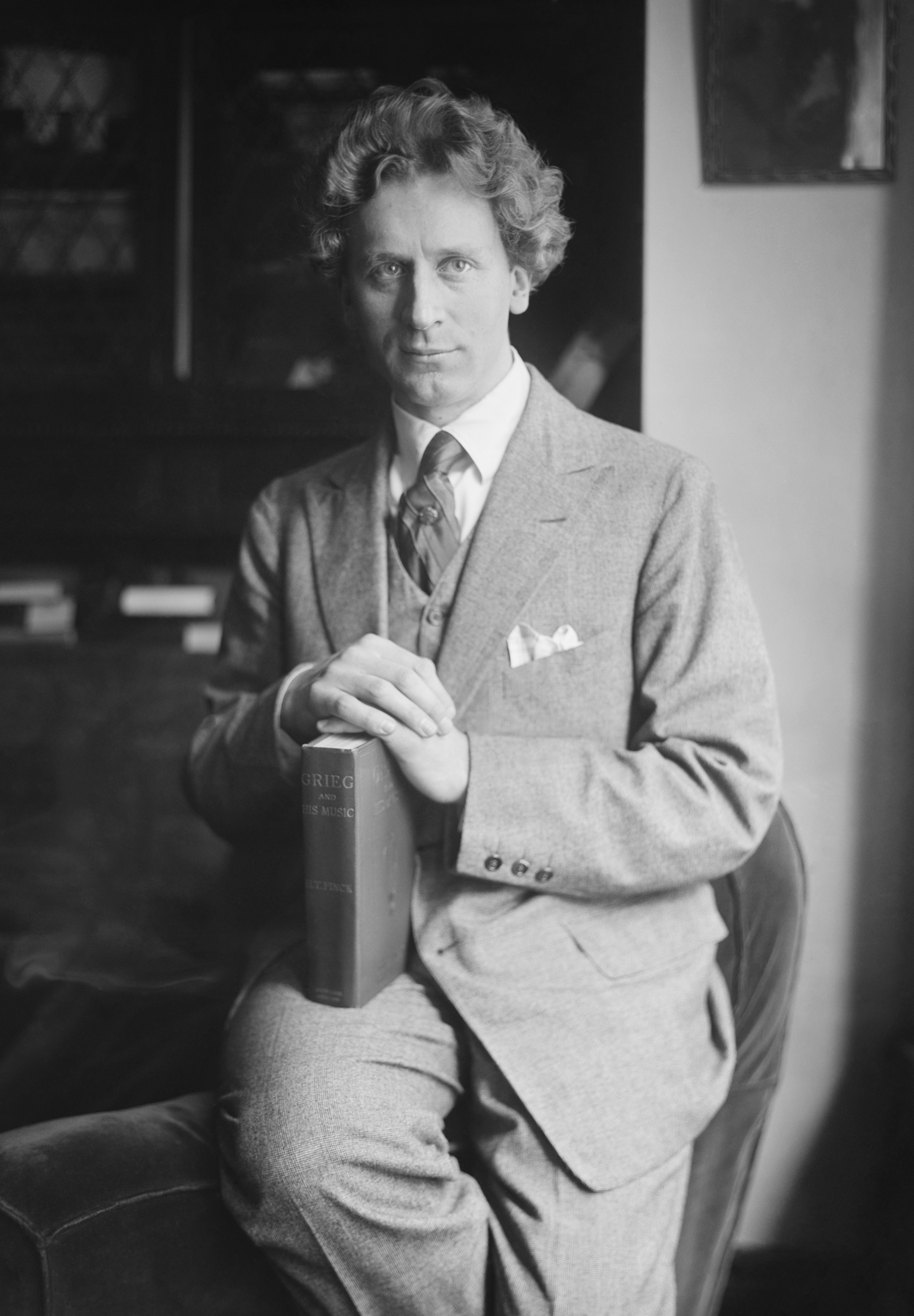
Percy Grainger, c. 1910s

"Seventeen Come Sunday", also known as "As I Roved Out", is an English folk song (Roud 277, Laws O17) which was arranged by Percy Grainger for choir and brass accompaniment in 1912 and used in the first movement of Ralph Vaughan Williams' English Folk Song Suite in 1923. The words were first published between 1838 and 1845.

According to Roud and Bishop

"This was a widely known song in England, and was also popular in Ireland and Scotland. It is one of those which earlier editors, such as Sabine Baring-Gould and Cecil Sharp, felt obliged to soften or rewrite for publication. It was also common on broadsides throughout the nineteenth century"

An earlier version was first printed on a broadside of around 1810 with the title Maid and the Soldier. Early broadside versions were sad songs focused on the abandonment of the girl by the young man. Later broadside and traditional folk versions celebrate a sexual encounter. A censored version published by Baring-Gould and Sharp substitutes a proposal of marriage for the encounter.

== Lyrics ==
"Seventeen Come Sunday"
A United States Navy Band Sea Chanters ensemble rendition of the 1912 Percy Grainger version of "Seventeen Come Sunday"

As I walked out on a May morning, on a May morning so early,
I overtook a pretty fair maid just as the day was a-dawning.

Chorus:
With a rue-rum-ray, fol-the-diddle-ay,
Whack-fol-lare-diddle-I-doh.

Her eyes were bright and her stockings white, and her buckling shone like silver,
She had a dark and a rolling eye, and her hair hung over her shoulder.

Where are you going, my pretty fair maid? Where are you going, my honey?
She answered me right cheerfully, I've an errand for my mummy.

How old are you, my pretty fair maid? How old are you, my honey?
She answered me right cheerfully, I'm seventeen come Sunday.

Will you take a man, my pretty fair maid? Will you take a man, my honey?
She answered me right cheerfully, I darst not for my mummy.

But if you come round to my mummy's house, when the moon shines bright and clearly,
I will come down and let you in, and my mummy shall not hear me.

So I went down to her mummy's house, when the moon shone bright and clearly,
She did come down and let me in, and I lay in her arms till morning.

So, now I have my soldier-man, and his ways they are quite winning.
The drum and fife are my delight, and a pint of rum in the morning.

The influential version published by Cecil Sharp substitutes:

O soldier, will you marry me ? For now's your time or never:
For if you do not marry me, My heart is broke for ever.
With my rue dum day, etc,

Other versions sung by traditional singers end differently.

In Sarah Makem's rendering the unfortunate girl is first beaten by her mother:

I went to the house on the top of the hill When the moon was shining dearly,
She arose to let me in, But her mother chanced to hear her.

She took her by the hair of her head, And down to the room she brought her,
And with the butt of a hazel twig She was the well beat daughter.

and then abandoned by her self-righteous lover:

I can't marry you, my bonny wee lass, I can't marry you, my honey,
For I have got a wife at home And how can I disdain her?

== Related songs ==
This song has been compared to a song usually called "The Overgate" or "With My Roving Eye". In both songs the narrator has a chance meeting with a pretty girl, leading to a sexual encounter. And the songs may have similar nonsense refrains. However the details of the texts are so different that the Roud Folk Song Index classifies them separately. "The Overgate" is Roud Number 866. One well-known recording ends the account of the encounter with:

But I said, I've lost my waistcoat, my watch chain and my purse!
Says she, I've lost my maidenhead, and that's a darned sigh worse!
Chorus
With my too-run-ra, lilt-fa-laddy
Lilt-fa-laddy, too-run-ray

== Other recordings ==
Versions of the song have been recorded by:

- 1952: Paddy Doran (recorded by Peter Kennedy)
- 1956: A.L. Lloyd (The Foggy Dew and Other Traditional English Love Songs)
- 1962: The Clancy Brothers (The Boys Won't Leave the Girls Alone)
- 1971: The Woods Band (The Woods Band)
- 1974: Planxty (The Well Below the Valley)
- 1976: The Bothy Band (Old Hag You Have Killed Me)
- 1977: Steeleye Span (Storm Force Ten)
- 1982: Eric Schoenberg (Steel Strings)
- 1985: Boiled in Lead (BOiLeD iN lEaD)
- 1988: Joe Heaney (The Voice of the People Vol 1)
- 1988: Bob Hart (The Voice of the People Vol 10)
- 1996: John Kirkpatrick (Force of Habit)
- 1997: Kate Rusby (Hourglass)
- 1998: Fairport Convention (The Cropredy Box)
- 2002: Waterson–Carthy (A Dark Light)
- 2007: Dalla (Rooz)
- 2010: Loreena McKennitt (The Wind That Shakes the Barley)
- 2011: The High Kings (Memory Lane)
- 2012: Charlie Scamp (The Voice of the People : I'm a Romany Rai)
- 2013: The Teacups (One for the Pot)
- 2017: Simply English (Long Grey Beard and a Head That's Bald)
- 2019: The Mary Wallopers (A Mouthful of The Mary Wallopers)
- 2024: Loreena McKennitt (The Road Back Home)

== See also ==
- One Morning in May (folk song)
