= Byker Hill =

English folk song

"Byker Hill" is a traditional English folk song about coal miners, Roud 3488, that has been performed by many contemporary acts. There are at least three different tunes to which the song is sung.

Byker Hill is in the east end of Newcastle, as is the adjoining district of Walker, also mentioned in the song.

The earliest versions of this song use the title "Walker Pits" as in the publication Rhymes of Northern Bards (1812) where it is song number 36. It was included under that title in A. L. Lloyd's collection "Come All Ye Bold Miners".

== One set of lyrics ==
I
If I had another penny
I would have another gill
I would make the piper play
The bonny lass of Byker Hill

Chorus:
Byker Hill and Walker Shore
Collier lads for ever more
Byker Hill and Walker Shore
Collier lads for ever more

II
The pitman and the keelman trim
They drink bumble made from gin
Then to dance they do begin
To the tune of Elsie Marley

[Chorus]

III
When first I went down to the dirt
I had no cowl nor no pitshirt
Now I've gotten two or three
Walker Pit's done well by me

[Chorus]

IV
The poor coal cutter he gets two shillings
The deputy he gets half a crown
The overman he gets five and six
And that's just for riding up and down

[Chorus]

V
Geordie Charlton, he had a pig
You hit it with a shovel and it danced a jig
All the way to Walker Shore
To the tune of Elsie Marley

[Chorus]

I (again)
If I had another penny
I would have another gill
I would make the piper play
The bonny lass of Byker Hill

[Chorus]

[Chorus]

== Notable versions of "Byker Hill" ==
- Martin Carthy on his 1967 album Byker Hill
- Dave Swarbrick on Swarbrick (1976)
- Tempest - on Shapeshifter, re-released on Prime Cuts
- Dave Van Ronk - on Going Back To Brooklyn (contemporary rewrite titled "Luang Prabang")
- Patrick Sky - on Songs That Made America Famous (Dave Van Ronk's "Luang Prabang")
- The Barely Works - on The Big Beat
- Australian Chamber Orchestra with Danny Spooner, Mike Kerin & Richard Tognetti
- The Imagined Village
- The Cottars - on Forerunner
- The Young Tradition - on both their self-titled album and Oberlin 1968
- Sportive Tricks - on their album Old Dogs New Tricks
- Pete Coe
- Bellowhead on Broadside
- Philip Wilby
- Boiled in Lead, on the 1985 album BOiLeD iN lEaD
- Brian Johnson, on the 2002 album From Tyne to Tweed - The Northumbria Anthology
- Chanticleer, on The Anniversary Album
- Steve Goodman - Live at University of Illinois, November 10, 1969
- The Lawrence Arms (Dave Van Ronk's "Luang Prabang")
- The Longest Johns - Byker Hill (2023)
