= Boiled in Lead (album) =

1985 album by Boiled in Lead

BOiLeD iN lEaD

Studio album by Boiled in Lead
- Released: 1985
- Genre: Celtic rock/Celtic punk, folk punk, gypsy punk
- Label: The Crack

Boiled in Lead chronology
Boiled Alive (1984)	BOiLeD iN lEaD (1985)	Hotheads (1986)

Professional ratings
Review scores
Source	Rating
Allmusic	3/5 stars
Guinness Encyclopedia of Popular Music	3/4 stars
MusicHound Folk	4/5 stars
Matter	(positive)
Rockpool	(positive)

BOiLeD iN lEaD, sometimes referred to as BOLD NED, is the first album by Twin Cities-based folk-punk band Boiled in Lead, self-released on its own label, The Crack. It received widespread critical praise after its release; record producer and musician Steve Albini called it "the most impressive debut record from a rock band I've heard all year." It is more strongly centered on a blend of alt-rock and traditional Anglo-Celtic folk than the band's subsequent albums, though the Hungarian dance tune "Arpad's Guz" gives a hint of the band's later eclecticism. Boiled in Lead's first vocalist, Jane Dauphin, plays a larger role here than on Hotheads, her second and final album with the band, singing lead on most of BOiLeD iN lEaD's songs and helping anchor its sound in traditional folk. Bassist Drew Miller also performs lead vocal on a few songs, including "Byker Hill", but after this album would stay strictly an instrumentalist.

The album includes several folk standards including "Byker Hill" and the Scottish ballad "Twa Corbies," as well as a cover of the Yardbirds' "Over Under Sideways Down." The song "The Man Who Was Boiled in Lead" is a version of Scottish writer John Leyden’s ballad "Lord Soulis", based on the death of Scottish lord William II de Soules, who was, according to legend, killed by his tenants at Ninestane Rig in 1320 by being boiled alive while wrapped in a sheet of lead, to defeat his mastery of black magic. (Despite the title, Boiled in Lead did not take its band name from this song but the Irish murder ballad "The Twa Sisters" as performed by folk group Clannad on their album Dúlamán, as well as the New Year's tradition in Nordic countries of molybdomancy, or casting molten lead into snow to foretell the future.)

The album's cover image is a 1538 woodcut by Hans Holbein the Younger, "Bones of All Men."

BOiLeD iN lEaD was later collected on the album Old Lead, along with the band's second album, Hotheads, and two previously unreleased tracks.

== Track listing ==
No.	Title	Length
1.	"The Man Who Was Boiled In Lead"	4:12
2.	"Banish Misfortune / The Road to Lisdoonvarna / O'Keefe's Slide"	3:58
3.	"Byker Hill"	3:07
4.	"Jamie Across The Water"	2:03
5.	"Arpad's Guz"	1:39
6.	"Over Under Sideways Down"	2:38
7.	"Walls Of Liscarroll / The Connachtman's Rambles"	2:19
8.	"Fisher's Hornpipe"	3:08
9.	"Tom And Jerry / Nine Points Of Roguery"	3:16
10.	"Twa Corbies"	3:27
11.	"As I Roved Out"	4:09
