= The Well Below =

2012 EP by Boiled in Lead

EP by Boiled in Lead
- Released: 2012
- Genre: Celtic rock/Celtic punk, folk punk, gypsy punk
- Length: 20:43
- Label: Omnium Records

Boiled in Lead chronology
Silver (2008)	The Well Below (2012)	King of the Dogwoods (2026)

Professional ratings
Review scores
Source	Rating
FolkWorld	3/5 stars
Green Man Review	(positive)
Huffington Post	(positive)

The Well Below is a four-song EP by Twin Cities-based folk punk band Boiled in Lead, its eighth collection of new material.

Critical reception to the album was positive. Huffington Post writer Stephen Winick called the band "a cooler, more American alternative to the Pogues, more skilled at their instruments, with more pure traditional music on one end and more rock electricity on the other," and praised their "hair-raising" and "foreboding" take on "The Well Below the Valley" and "rich, complex arrangement" of the Holcomb song. David Hintz of FolkWorld stated that the album "has the exotic flair we [have] all come to expect from this band."

== Track listing ==
No.	Title	Composer	Length
1.	"Wedding Dress"	Traditional	6:21
2.	"The Well Below the Valley"	Traditional	5:01
3.	"Western Borders"	John Vanorman	4:41
4.	"Transylvanian Stomp"	Traditional	4:40
