= Silver (Boiled in Lead album) =

2008 album by Boiled in Lead

Studio album by Boiled in Lead
- Released: 2008
- Genre: Celtic rock/Celtic punk, folk punk, gypsy punk
- Label: Omnium Records
- Producer: Boiled in Lead

Boiled in Lead chronology
Alloy (1998)	Silver (2008)	The Well Below (2012)

Professional ratings
Review scores
Source	Rating
Allmusic	4/5 stars
Green Man Review	(positive)
Global Rhythm	(positive)
Your Flesh	(positive)
World Music Central	(positive)

Silver is the seventh album by Minneapolis folk punk band Boiled in Lead. The band's first studio album in 13 years, Silver also marked Boiled in Lead's 25th anniversary. The album also reflected a number of significant lineup changes. It was the band's first studio recording after the return of longtime lead singer Todd Menton, and the addition of guitarist Dean Magraw. Longtime drummer Robin Anders played on Silver and at the album's live release show, but would leave the group later that year.

Green Man Review writer Chuck Lipsig noted that Menton's presence marked something of a return to the sound of the group's most musically eclectic albums, 1989's From the Ladle to the Grave and 1990's Orb. The album again featured a strong Celtic flavor but also included Middle Eastern and Algerian influences on songs like "Berber" and "Menfi." The album also includes a cover of "The Sunset," originally performed by Frankie Kennedy and Mairéad Ní Mhaonaigh, co-founders of the Irish folk band Altan, on their 1987 album Altan.

== Critical reception ==
Critical reception to Silver was positive. Green Man Review writer Robert Tilendis praised the album as "something better than good," with a "high level of musicianship and what I can only see as an intense focus." Allmusic's Chris Nickson called the album a strong return to form after a long absence from the studio, and noted that although the band had lost some of its "punk attitude" of 20 years earlier, "older and wiser also translates into more finesse."

== Track listing ==
No.	Title	Composer	Length
1.	"Apple Tree Wassail"	Traditional	3:01
2.	"The Sunset"	Cathal McConnell/Séamus Quinn	5:03
3.	"Jolly Tinker"	Traditional	4:01
4.	"Silver Carp"	Todd Menton	3:34
5.	"Come In From The Rain"	Traditional	4:40
6.	"House Carpenter"	Traditional	4:34
7.	"Berber"	Robin Adnan Anders	5:24
8.	"Death On Hennepin"	John Vanorman	4:12
9.	"Corner House"	Traditional	4:29
10.	"Menfi"		5:50
11.	"Rushes Green"	Traditional	6:14
