= David Stenshoel =

American musician and visual artist

- Born: David Rockne Stenshoel; 1949/1950
- Died: September 16, 2021 (age 71) Minnetonka, Minnesota
- Genres: World music; Celtic rock; jazz
- Occupations: Musician; visual artist
- Instruments: Violin; tenor saxophone; mandolin; gaida
- Years active: 1970s–2021
- Formerly of: Boiled in Lead

David Rockne Stenshoel (1949/1950 – September 16, 2021, in Minnetonka, Minnesota) was an American musician and visual artist, most well known as a longtime member of Celtic-rock and world-music group Boiled in Lead.

== Early life ==
Stenshoel grew up in Sioux Falls, South Dakota, and the Minneapolis suburbs. He had two brothers and a sister. His father, Myles Stenshoel, founded the political science department at Augsburg College (now Augsburg University) and taught at many other institutions.

== Career ==
Stenshoel began playing the violin at age 10 and became a professional musician in his 20s. In the 1970s, he played with his brother Peter in the Infinity Art Unit, an improvisational free jazz group which incorporated blues and medieval tunes. He and Peter also performed together in the mid-1980s jazz-rock group Intuitive Bikers. He also played on Peter's solo albums Strangely Colored Maps (1988) and Codex From The Trickster (1993).

Stenshoel maintained a lifelong, world-spanning interest in musical traditions and instruments from many cultures. While his main instruments were the violin, tenor saxophone, electric mandolin and gaida (southern European bagpipes), he was also proficient on a number of other ethnic instruments, including the zurna (a Turkish woodwind), kaen (a Thai mouth organ), and saz (a Persian lute also called a bağlama). His broad musical proficiency was matched by speed; the day after he acquired a kaen, he had learned it well enough to perform on stage with it. Near the end of his life, when an operation for oral cancer had prevented him from playing his usual instruments, he taught himself to play the oud.

He was critically praised for his virtuosity. Steve Pick of the St. Louis Post-Dispatch wrote that Stenshoel "was adept at many different fiddle styles, capable of playing, with the right feel, melodies from Ireland or Armenia equally well. On mandolin, he was particularly capable of summoning screaming noise and feedback." He was frequently an active member or sideman in seven or more bands at once, in genres including Celtic, Persian, Brazilian, Balkan, Middle Eastern, African, and country-swing.

=== Boiled in Lead ===
Stenshoel was a longtime member of Boiled in Lead, chiefly playing the fiddle, electric mandolin, and saxophone. Boiled in Lead has been hailed as a pioneering bridge between American rock and international music, and a precursor to Gogol Bordello and other gypsy-punk bands, blending musical influences including Celtic, African and Middle Eastern, folk, bluegrass and punk. Tim Walters of MusicHound Folk called the group "the most important folk-rock band to appear since the 1970s."

Stenshoel joined Boiled in Lead for its first official performance on St. Patrick's Day in 1983. He performed with the band for more than 30 years (1983-1990 and 1997–2021). He had the second-longest tenure of any member of Boiled in Lead after founding bassist Drew Miller. He appears on almost all of its studio records, including the group's most critically acclaimed albums. Stenshoel took a break from the band for several years after the birth of his son, departing before the band recorded 1990's Orb, though he is a guest musician on several tracks. He returned to the band in 1997 and played on the 2009 album Silver and 2012 EP The Well Below.

=== Other work ===
Stenshoel performed with many other groups in and around the Twin Cities, including Voices of Sepharad, Felonious Bosch, Sky King, Jan Reimer Band, You, Me and Betsy, Electric Arab Orchestra, Ethnic Dance Theater, Yiddishe Folksmenschn, the American Swedish Institute Spelmanslag, Automatix, Shalita, Robayat, Honeysuckle Rose, Vernon Dixon, Katy and the T-Bergs, Dusty Drapes and the Dusters, Parisota Hot Club, StellaRoma, Other Country Quartet, Redondo, Crossing Borders, Radio Rangers, and the children's choir Songs of Hope. He also performed with radio comedy programs Another Flask of Weird and Little City in Space.

Stenshoel was also a musical archivist; in the early 1980s, with Cliff Sloane, Stenshoel helped to record performances by Cambodian immigrant musicians in Minneapolis and St. Paul. The resulting album, Cambodian Traditional Music in Minnesota, was named to the Library of Congress' list of notable American Folk Music and Folklore Recordings for 1984.

Stenshoel also performed music for plays and films, including Peter Glazer's 1992 biographical play Woody Guthrie's American Song at Cricket Theatre in Minneapolis and, in 1994, a live soundtrack to Paul Leni's 1929 horror film The Last Warning.

== Awards and honors ==
He was nominated frequently for the Minnesota Music Awards in the 1980s and 1990s; he won in 1988 as a solo performer for Best Acoustic/Ethnic Instrumentalist, and at least nine times as a member of Boiled in Lead.

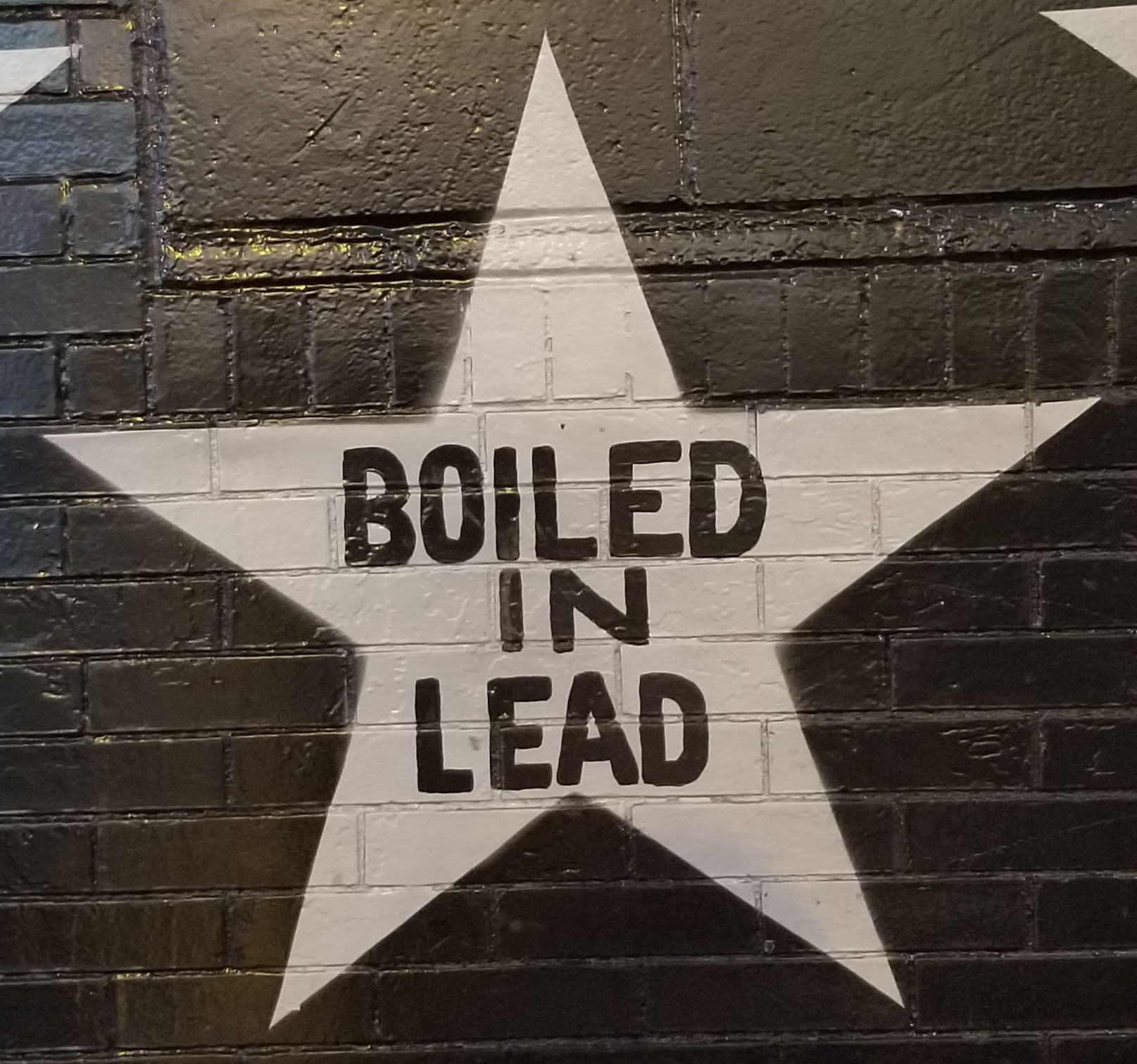
Boiled in Lead's star on the outside mural of the Minneapolis nightclub First Avenue

Boiled in Lead has been honored with a star on the outside mural of the Minneapolis nightclub First Avenue, recognizing performers that have played sold-out shows or have otherwise demonstrated a major contribution to the culture at the iconic venue. Receiving a star "might be the most prestigious public honor an artist can receive in Minneapolis," according to journalist Steve Marsh.

== Selected discography ==
- Boiled in Lead, Boiled in Lead (1984)
- Boiled in Lead, Boiled Alive (1984)
- Boiled in Lead, Hotheads (Atomic Theory, 1987)
- The Intuitive Bikers, Bikin' into It (1987)
- Peter Stenshoel, Strangely Colored Map (Numazu, 1988)
- Bob Zander featuring Max Swanson, Friend for Life (Raz Recordings, 1988)
- Boiled in Lead, From the Ladle to the Grave (Atomic Theory, 1989)
- Boiled in Lead, Orb (Atomic Theory, 1990)
- Cats Laughing, Another Way to Travel (1990)
- Boiled in Lead, Old Lead (1991)
- Voices of Sepharad, Viva Sepharad (1992)
- Voices of Sepharad, Hamsa (1992)
- Peter Stenshoel, Codex from The Trickster (Numazu, 1993)
- Bob Zander, Almost Orlana (Raz, 1994)
- Robin Adnan Anders, Omaiyo (Rykodisc, 1998)
- Boiled in Lead, Alloy (1998)
- Tim Malloys, Drunkards, Bastards, and Blackguards (Fabulous, 2000)
- Bob Zander, Skyline to the Sea (2002)
- Boiled in Lead, Silver (2008)
- Felonious Bosch, Toy Box (2010)
- Joe Fahey, Bushnell's Turtle (2011)
- Boiled in Lead, The Well Below (Omnium, 2012)
- Felonious Bosch, Welcome to Bordertown (2013)
- Kari Tauring, Nykken & Bear (Omnium, 2013)
- Vernon Dixon, Corn Whiskey (Friendly Dive, 2014)
- Nigel Egg, The Blues Is Personal (Spiff Key, 2014)
- Greg Herriges, Artifacts (2014)
- Bob Zander, Thumbnail Sketches (2017)
- StellaRoma, Revel and Ritual: Holiday Music for the World (2018)

== Personal life ==
Stenshoel was married and had a son.

== Death ==
Stenshoel died on September 16, 2021, in Minnetonka, Minnesota from squamous cell carcinoma of the gingiva. He was 71.
