= Little Red =

Little Red may refer to:

- Little Red (album), a 2014 album by Katy B
- Little Red (band), a rock band from Australia
- Little Red (Saranac Lake, New York), a historic cottage
- Virgin Atlantic Little Red, a defunct airline subsidiary
- Crimson (wrestler) (born 1985), also known as Little Red
- "Little Red", a song on the 2010 Cathy Davey album The Nameless

== See also ==
- Lil' Red, University of Nebraska–Lincoln sports mascot
