= Paulina Bisztyga =

Polish singer, composer, and poet (born 1978)

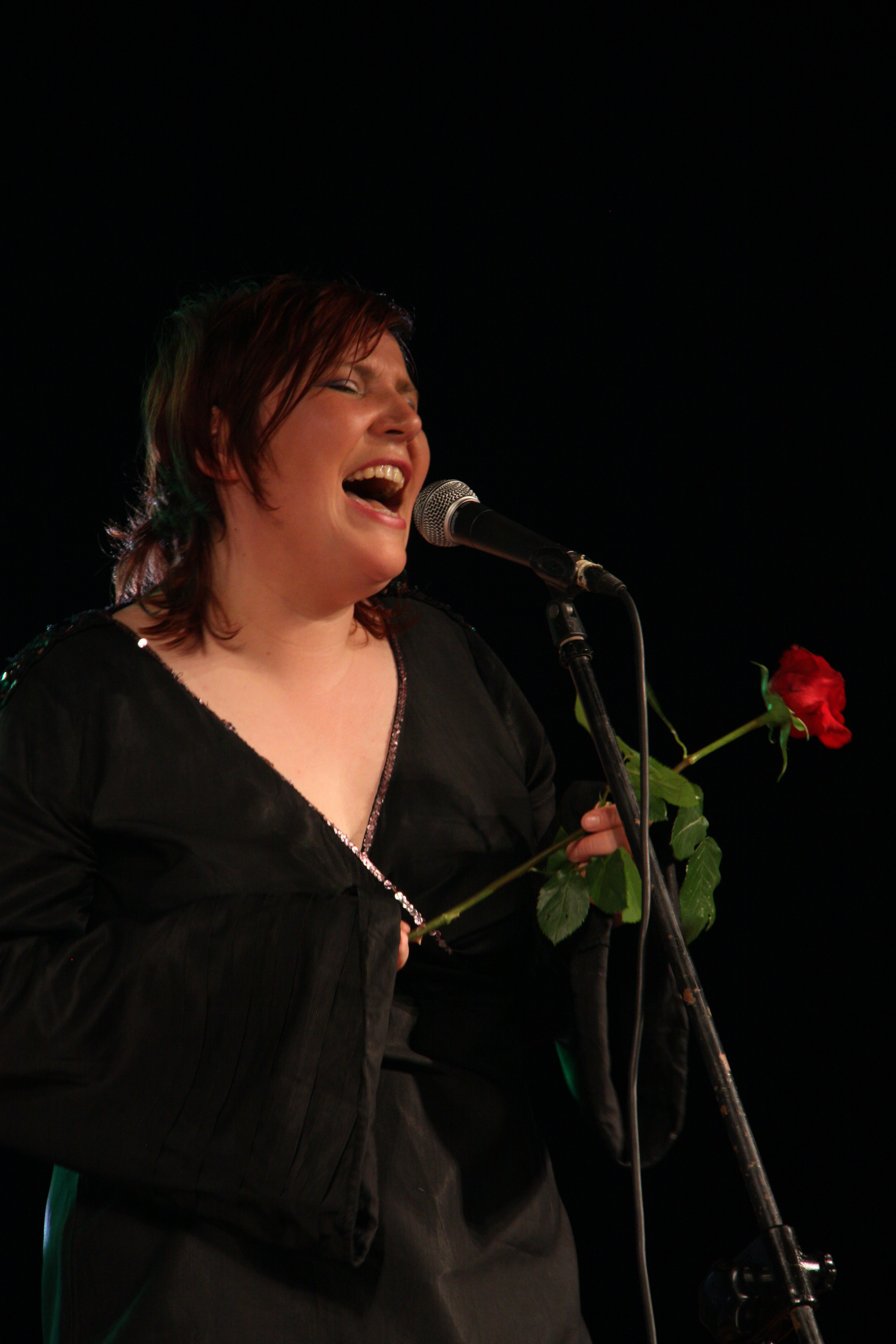
- Born: 30 August 1978 (age 47); Kraków
- Occupations: singer composer poet

Paulina Bisztyga (born 30 August 1978) is a Polish singer, composer, poet and radio journalist.

== Life ==
A daughter of Stanisław Bisztyga, politician and economist, and his wife Wiktoria. She graduated artistic high school in Nowy Wiśnicz and Jagiellonian University (history of art).

Her first poems were published in "Gazeta Krakowska" in 1993. In 1995, she published a poetry book titled Nie nazywaj mnie mrokiem. In 1999 during Student Song Festival in Kraków she won second award for the song Nie ma co się bać (There is nothing to be afraid), which was also the title-song for her first solo album (released in 2000).

Currently Bisztyga is co-host (together with Agnieszka Barańska) of programme Nocna kawa (Night coffee), which is broadcast on Radio Kraków.

== Discography ==
- 2000: Nie ma co się bać
- 2002: Idź po swoje (a single)
- 2007: Proste jest prawo miłości
- 2009: Zmiłości
