= Cats Laughing =

Folk rock band from Minneapolis, US

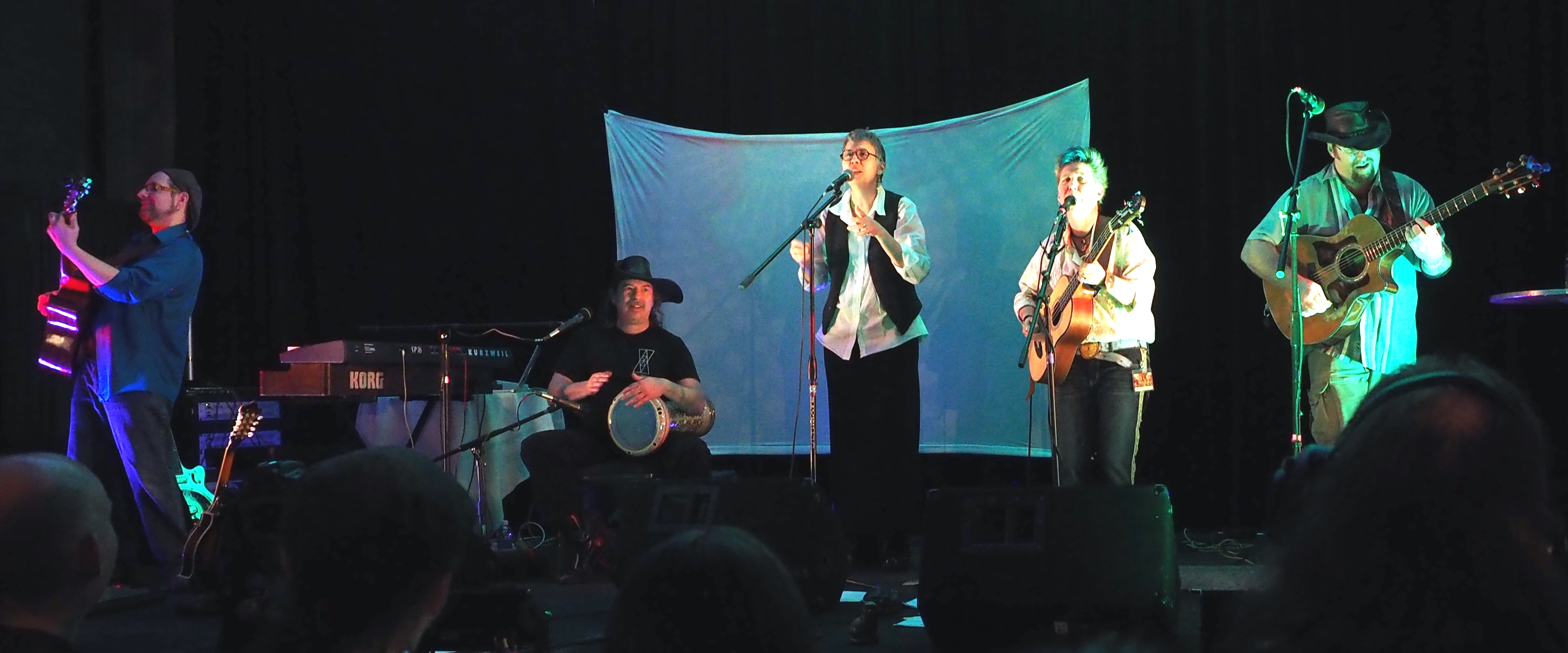
- Cats Laughing reunion performance, April 2015

Background information
- Origin: Minneapolis, Minnesota, U.S.
- Genres: Folk rock
- Years active: 1988–1996, 2015
- Label: Spin Art
- Members: Steven Brust; Emma Bull; Lojo Russo; Adam Stemple; Scott Keever
- Past members: Bill Colsher

Cats Laughing is a folk rock band, founded in the late 1980s in Minneapolis, Minnesota, and revived in 2015. Several of its members, including Emma Bull and Steven Brust, are better known as writers of fantasy and science fiction.

The group released two studio albums and remained active through the early 1990s. After a hiatus of two decades, a reunion concert took place in April 2015, later released as the live double CD A Long Time Gone (2016), with a concert DVD released under the same title.

== Personnel ==
The original members of the group were Steven Brust on drums, Emma Bull on lead vocals, Bill Colsher on guitar and synthesizer, Lojo Russo on bass and vocals, and Adam Stemple on guitar and vocals. For the group's 2015 reunion, Colsher was replaced by Scott Keever, performing on guitar, mandolin, and keyboards.

Both Brust and Bull are best known as professional authors of fantasy and science fiction novels. Stemple, a professional musician, is also the author of several fantasy novels, including two series of books for young readers co-authored with his mother, the fantasy writer and editor Jane Yolen.

== Cats Laughing (1988) ==
Cats Laughing

Studio album by Cats Laughing
- Released: 1988
- Genre: Folk rock
- Length: 45:46
- Label: Spin Art

In 1988, Cats Laughing released their debut album, self-titled but also known as Bootleg Issue, initially on cassette and CD. The first album was later reissued and distributed under the titles The Basement Tape and Reissue. It was re-released digitally in 2013 under the title The First Album.

Under the title 2016 Re-Reissue, a digitally remastered version was released on CD in March 2016. Its cover art was designed to give the appearance of a cassette insert from Reissue, with the handwritten addition of "2016 Re-" before the previous title.

=== Production notes ===
The album was recorded on a four-track recorder, with effects created using guitar stomp boxes and a home stereo equalizer. The track "Signal to Noise" was initially listed as three tracks, with its introductory section broken out under the title "FMera", and the ending section broken out under the title "FMera (reprise)." The noise that starts "FMera" (or "Signal to Noise") was Adam Stemple striking a match close to the microphone.

The concluding songs of the album were further described by Emma Bull:

Since the first CD was made from the original cassette, where there were no electronic markers for the beginnings and ends of songs, things can get kinda hairy. But here's the Official Conception: "Back Door" ends. Then the strange ambient noise-jam starts up that we developed, when playing live, to suggest a radio being tuned across a series of frequencies that weren't coming in well enough to identify—sort of a "driving across the middle of nowhere late at night and getting things on your radio that might be signals from outer space" feel. That's "FMera" (which we didn't name until we recorded it), which is really just the intro to "Signal to Noise." Since we were way into structure, we had to go out as we came in, so "Signal to Noise" ends with more space-jam noise, which is "FMera (reprise)". The album ends in a mighty doom-and-gloom crash with "More Thumbscrews," the song that starts with the lyrics, "The trees bowed to greet me as I passed by."

=== Track listing ===
No.	Title	Writer(s)	Vocals	Length
1.	"The Enchantment"	E. Bull	Bull	4:34
2.	"Gloomy Sunday"	Rezső Seress (credited as trad. Hungarian)	Russo	5:34
3.	"Half-Dollar Blues"	S. Brust & A. Stemple	Stemple	2:39
4.	"Facade"	Lojo Russo	Russo	4:29
5.	"Tellers of Tales"	S. Brust & A. Stemple	Stemple, Russo, Bull	5:54
6.	"The Good Stuff"	Lojo Russo	Russo	4:50
7.	"Back Door"	A. Stemple	Stemple	4:49
8.	"Signal to Noise"	E. Bull	Bull	6:52
9.	"More Thumbscrews"	S. Brust	Bull	6:08

== Another Way to Travel (1990) ==
Another Way to Travel

Studio album by Cats Laughing
- Released: 1990
- Genre: Folk rock
- Length: 56:10
- Label: Spin Art

Cats Laughing: Another Way to Travel
Review scores
Source	Rating
AllMusic	4.5/5 stars

The group's second album, Another Way to Travel, was released in 1990 with ten original songs, and an arrangement of the traditional song "Nottamun Town."

=== Production notes ===
The song "Black Knight's Work" was co-written by Emma Bull and another science fiction and fantasy writer, John M. Ford. Dave Stenshoel (fiddle) and Robin Anders (additional percussion), both members of the band Boiled in Lead, appeared on Another Way to Travel as guest musicians.

The album featured cover art by editor and author Terri Windling, depicting the band members and a vehicle known as the Catmobile that was used to transport the band. The vehicle, owned by Brust, was a Cadillac ambulance that had been painted yellow, light blue, and dark blue, with murals.

=== Critical reception ===
According to AllMusic reviewer Richard Foss, "The original tunes on Another Way to Travel are as inventive as might be expected of a band with two highly original poets and novelists aboard... it's hard to listen to this disc without a pang of regret that Cats Laughing didn't stay together a while longer and record a few more albums." Foss pointed to the album's "sophisticated, complex arrangements of all sorts of music", bringing "a sense of character and purpose" that spanned multiple genres.

=== Track listing ===
No.	Title	Writer(s)	Length
1.	"Bright Street Beachhouse Back in Business Blues"	S. Brust & E. Bull	5:52
2.	"The Undertoad"	Lojo Russo	3:49
3.	"Sing Out"	A. Stemple	5:51
4.	"Nottamun Town"	Traditional	5:38
5.	"See How the Sparrow Flies"	S. Brust	3:06
6.	"For It All"	Emma Bull	4:12
7.	"Elijah"	S. Brust & A. Stemple	6:28
8.	"Wear My Face"	E. Bull & A. Stemple	6:59
9.	"Stars Overhead"	A. Stemple & S. Brust	4:26
10.	"Black Knight's Work"	John M. Ford & E. Bull	3:57
11.	"Draw the Curtain"	S. Brust, A. Stemple, & E. Bull	5:52

== Musical career in the mid-1990s ==
As Cats Laughing became less active in the 1990s, Emma Bull also played in folk duo The Flash Girls, while Stemple was one of the lead singers and a guitarist for the folk celtic punk band Boiled in Lead. Russo switched from bass to mandolin to play in the Irish band Gallowglass, then began a solo career in 1993. The group occasionally reunited as late as the mid-1990s.

In 1994, two Cats Laughing songs were included in the soundtrack of a video, an extended promotional trailer for a potential film production based on Emma Bull's screenplay for her novel War for the Oaks (1987). In addition to the two full-length songs, the trailer also opened with the introduction to "Signal to Noise" (also known as "FMera") from The Bootleg Issue.

The video was shot on location in Minneapolis by Will Shetterly, and included "Nottamun Town" and a new Cats Laughing song, "Here We Go Again," that was based on War for the Oaks. The full eleven-minute trailer was published at Green Man Review. Excerpts from the trailer that included "Here We Go Again" and "Nottamun Town" were later self-released in higher resolution by Shetterly.

== A Long Time Gone (2016) ==
A Long Time Gone

Live album by Cats Laughing
- Released: March 27, 2016
- Recorded: 2015
- Venues: Minicon 50, Bloomington, MN
- Genre: Folk rock
- Label: Beyond Conventions

=== 2015 reunion concerts ===
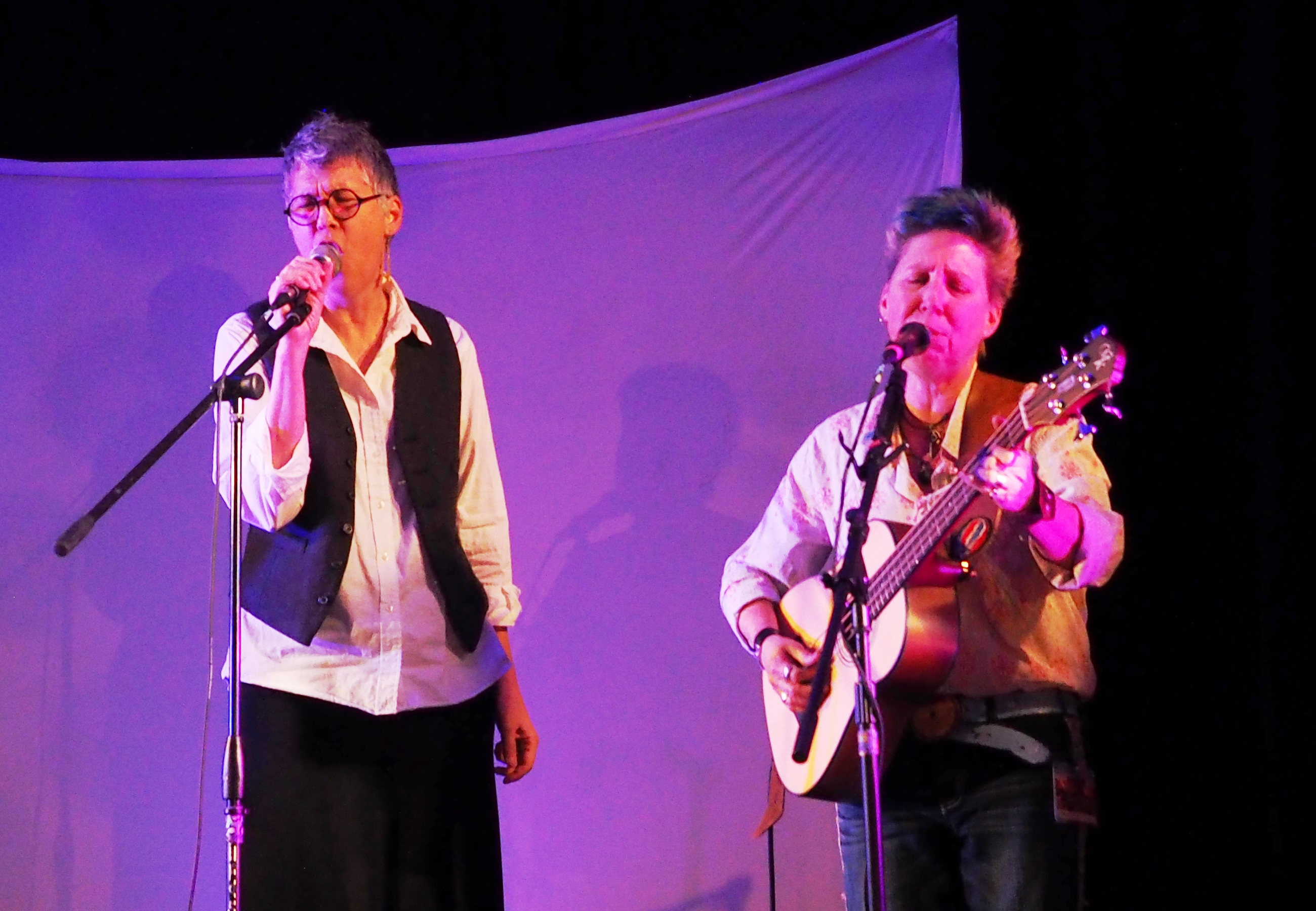
Emma Bull and Lojo Russo at reunion concert

A reunion concert by Cats Laughing took place on April 3, 2015, at the Minicon 50 science fiction convention in Bloomington, Minnesota. The Minnesota Science Fiction Society hosted a two-hour concert on the convention's opening Friday night. An additional reunion concert was held in Minneapolis at the Phoenix Theater on August 26, 2015.

The reunited group included Steven Brust, Emma Bull, Lojo Russo, and Minicon 50's musician guest of honor, Adam Stemple. Bill Colsher declined to participate publicly, but remained engaged in plans associated with the reunion. The group took on a new member, Scott Keever, on guitar, mandolin, and keyboards.

=== Production notes ===
The reunion project, including live video streaming of the concert and production of a concert CD and DVD, was fully funded in January 2015 by a Kickstarter campaign. The additional reunion concert in August 2015 was held specifically so that it could be recorded for the release, in light of issues with audio recording of the earlier performance.

In March 2016, Cats Laughing released a live double CD of the 2015 reunion concert, A Long Time Gone, as well as a DVD by the same title with documentary concert footage.

=== Track listing ===
CD 1
No.	Title	Length
1.	"See How the Sparrow Flies"
2.	"Black Knight's Work"
3.	"Bring It 'Round"
4.	"Teller of Tales"
5.	"Big Boss Man"
6.	"The Eagle and the Hummingbird"
7.	"The Fair Lady"
8.	"White Rabbit"
9.	"More Thumbscrews"
10.	"Bright Street Beachhouse Back in Business Blues"

CD 2
No.	Title	Length
1.	"Draw the Curtain"
2.	"Gloomy Sunday"
3.	"Nottamun Town"
4.	"Stars Overhead"
5.	"The Good Stuff"
6.	"Sing Out"
7.	"Signal to Noise"
8.	"The Undertoad"
9.	"For It All"
10.	"Wear My Face"

== References in other media ==
- Born to Run, an urban fantasy novel by Mercedes Lackey and Larry Dixon, makes a passing reference to "a few humans in Cats Laughing... concert-tour sweatshirts."
- Cats Laughing also appear in Spider Robinson's novel The Callahan Touch, and "among other weird and wonderful things [play] Lady Day's classic 'Gloomy Sunday' in Hungarian."
- Cats Laughing appears as a band in the Borderland series, a series of urban fantasy novels and short stories created and edited by Terri Windling.
- DC Comics' 1992 original Star Trek graphic novel Debt of Honor depicts James T. Kirk as having collected old Cats Laughing tapes. Kirk's girlfriend states that she likes his taste in music.
- Marvel Comics superhero Kitty Pryde described Cats Laughing as her favorite band. The band members themselves appeared in Excalibur No. 5 as Murderworld simulations, in the 1990 one-shot Excalibur: Mojo Mayhem, and in the 1991 magazine Marvel Illustrated: The Swimsuit Issue. The band was also referenced in the DC comic Sovereign Seven. Kitty Pryde's creator Chris Claremont also listed Cats Laughing as the favorite band of Lt. Nicole Shea, the main character of his first flight series of novels.
- The song "Signal to Noise", written by Emma Bull for the first Cats Laughing album, supplied the title for a graphic novel by Neil Gaiman. The song was later recorded by The Flash Girls.
