= The Gypsy (novel) =

1992 fantasy novel by Steven Brust and Megan Lindholm

- First edition
- Author: Steven Brust, Megan Lindholm
- Cover artist: Sam Rakeland
- Language: English
- Genre: Urban fantasy
- Publisher: Tor Books
- Publication date: 1992
- Publication place: United States
- Pages: 338 (Tor paperback edition)
- ISBN: 978-0-3128-5274-0
- OCLC: 25316930

The Gypsy is a 1992 urban fantasy novel written by Megan Lindholm and Steven Brust. It blends elements of Hungarian folk tales with a modern-day detective story. The book contains many lyrics to songs that were later recorded by Minnesota Celtic-punk band Boiled in Lead for their album Songs from The Gypsy.

== Editions and translations ==
The first edition was a hardcover issued by Tor Books in July 1992. At least two softcover editions have been issued since: a mass-market paperback by Tor Books in July 1993 and a trade paperback edition by Orb Books in April 2005. A French translation, La nuit du prédateur, was published by Mnémos in April 2006.

== Songs from The Gypsy ==
Songs from The Gypsy is an album by Boiled in Lead, as a soundtrack to the book. The album was released on June 21, 1995, in a special enhanced CD format that included the whole text of the book and extra features such as sound clips.

=== Track listing ===
1. Raven, Owl, and I (3:17)
2. Leanan Sidhe (3:48)
3. Hide My Track (4:04)
4. No Passenger (1:59)
5. Back In Town (3:38)
6. Ugros (Springtime) (6:17)
7. The Gypsy (8:08)
8. Blackened Page (4:56)
9. The Fair Lady (3:05)
10. Red Lights and Neon (4:13)
