= Orb (Boiled in Lead album) =

1990 album by Boiled in Lead

Studio album by Boiled in Lead
- Released: 1990
- Genre: Celtic rock/Celtic punk, folk punk, gypsy punk
- Length: 50:04
- Label: Atomic Theory/Cooking Vinyl; reissued on Omnium Records in 1995
- Producer: Hijaz Mustapha

Boiled in Lead chronology
From the Ladle to the Grave (1989)	Orb (1990)	Antler Dance (1994)

Professional ratings
Review scores
Source	Rating
Allmusic	4.5/5 stars
Guinness Encyclopedia of Popular Music	3/4 stars
MusicHound Folk	4.5/5 stars
Chicago Tribune	2.5/4 stars
Folk Roots	(positive)
Green Man Review	(positive)
New Musical Express	7/10 stars
Q	4/5 stars
Select	2/5 medals

Orb is the fourth album by Minneapolis folk punk band Boiled in Lead. It was produced by Hijaz Mustapha of British worldbeat band 3 Mustaphas 3.

Orb found Boiled in Lead exploring a wider range of traditional music styles than ever before, moving beyond the confines of the Fairport Convention-influenced Celtic rock of previous albums and adding material from Albania, Romania, Macedonia, Sweden, Appalachia, and Thailand. The album's title reflects this, suggesting an embrace of a truly global musical perspective. Bassist Drew Miller attributed the widening of the band's sound to the eye-opening realization that their European audiences were just as comfortable with American musical styles as with any European forms. "We came to the decision that since we're Americans, there's no reason we have to play all Irish material. So we don't." Brett Durand Atwood of Gavin Report praised the album's eclecticism, calling it "a one-world sonic showcase for the tunes of our brothers, sisters, and ancestors." Besides the many world-music influences, Orb also delves into punk rock and psychobilly with guitarist/vocalist Todd Menton's "Tape Decks All Over Hell."

== Track listing ==
No.	Title	Composer	Length
1.	"Klezpolka"	Cuz Teahan/Traditional	3:28
2.	"Son, Oh Son"	Todd Menton	3:30
3.	"Tape Decks All Over Hell"	Todd Menton	1:43
4.	"Snow On The Hills"	Aina Eagan/Traditional	2:52
5.	"Serbian Kolo #3"	Traditional	3:33
6.	"Army (Dream Song)"	Todd Menton	3:16
7.	"Harout"	Traditional	3:17
8.	"Brave Bombardier"	Todd Menton/Traditional	2:51
9.	"Sota"	Traditional	4:02
10.	"Siege Of Delhi"	Traditional	4:32
11.	"Hard Times"	Traditional	2:02
12.	"Sally In The Garden"	Traditional	2:22
13.	"Glasena Klingar"	Traditional	2:52
14.	"The Town Of Ballybay"	Traditional	3:52
15.	"Cunovo Oro"	Traditional	4:26
16.	"Kaen-Lao Gratop Mai"	Traditional	1:59
