= Boiled in Lead =

Folk-punk/worldbeat band from Minneapolis

- Drew Miller, Mo Engel, and Todd Menton of Boiled in Lead in 2024

Background information
- Origin: Minneapolis, Minnesota, United States
- Genres: Folk punk, worldbeat, folk rock, alternative rock, Celtic rock, Celtic punk, Gypsy punk
- Years active: 1983–present
- Labels: The Crack, Atomic Theory, Omnium
- Members: Drew Miller; Todd Menton; Mo Engel
- Past members: Robin Adnan Anders; Marc Anderson; Michael Bissonnette; Jane Dauphin; Brian Fox; Mitch Griffin; Josef Kessler; Laura MacKenzie; Dean Magraw; Haley Olson; Michael Ravaz; Adam Stemple; David Stenshoel
- Website: www.boiledinlead.com

Boiled in Lead is a folk-punk/worldbeat band based in Minneapolis, Minnesota, and founded in 1983. Tim Walters of MusicHound Folk called the group "the most important folk-rock band to appear since the 1970s." Influential record producer and musician Steve Albini called the band's self-titled first album "the most impressive debut record from a rock band I've heard all year." Their style, sometimes called "rock 'n' reel," is heavily influenced by both traditional folk music and punk rock, and has drawn them praise as one of the few American bands of the 1980s and 1990s to expand on Fairport Convention's rocked-up take on traditional folk. Folk Roots magazine noted that Boiled in Lead's "folk-punk" approach synthesized the idealistic and archival approach of 1960s folk music with the burgeoning American alternative-rock scene of the early 1980s typified by Hüsker Dü and R.E.M. The band also incorporates a plethora of international musical traditions, including Russian, Turkish, Bulgarian, Scottish, Vietnamese, Hungarian, African, klezmer, and Romani music.

Boiled in Lead has been hailed as a pioneering bridge between American rock and international music, and a precursor to Gogol Bordello and other gypsy-punk bands. Noting Boiled in Lead's ability to evolve its sound and include a huge diversity of ethnic music into its main blend of folk and punk, British music website The Midlands wrote that "they’re the natural successors to Fairport Convention and have a legacy that will echo throughout the years." While most heavily active in the 1980s and 1990s, the group is still performing today, including annual St. Patrick's Day concerts in Minneapolis. Over the course of its career, Boiled in Lead has released nearly a dozen albums and EPs, most recently 2026's King of the Dogwoods.

In September 2026, Boiled in Lead announced that the band would be going on indefinite hiatus, with a final show at Crooners Supper Club in Minneapolis scheduled for October 31.

== History ==
=== Early 1980s: Original lineup and BOiLeD iN lEaD ===
Although Boiled in Lead recorded Scottish writer John Leyden's ballad "Lord Soulis" under the title "The Man Who Was Boiled in Lead" on their first album, the band's name is actually taken from the murder ballad "The Two Sisters" as performed by folk group Clannad on their album Dúlamán, as well as the New Year's tradition in Nordic countries of molybdomancy, or casting molten lead into snow to foretell the future.

Boiled in Lead has gone through several significant lineup changes over the years, including three different lead singers. Bassist Drew Miller is the only original member who has played with the band in all incarnations. Miller, who grew up in Washington, D.C., was inspired by that city's hardcore punk scene to merge the energy and aggression of rock music with traditional folk. The band was also inspired by British folk-rock groups like Fairport Convention and Steeleye Span. The first lineup, formed in 1983, included Miller, vocalist/guitarist Jane Dauphin, fiddle player Brian Fox, and a drum machine dubbed "Amos Box." Second fiddler David Stenshoel and drummer Mitch Griffin joined in time for the band's first concert on St. Patrick's Day 1983 at the now-closed Goofy's Upper Deck in Minneapolis, with Hüsker Dü and Otto's Chemical Lounge. The band's first release was a 45-minute live cassette-only album, Boiled Alive, in 1984, which Simon Jones of Folk Roots described as "mean, nasty, and hugely enjoyable." After Fox left the band, the remaining lineup recorded the band's debut studio album, BOiLeD iN lEaD, released in 1985. Dauphin sang most of the lead vocals, with Miller performing on a few including "Byker Hill"; after this album he would stay strictly an instrumentalist.

In a 2026 interview with the KMUW-FM radio show Into Music, Miller discussed the similarities and differences between Boiled in Lead and Irish folk-punk group The Pogues, noting that while both bands emerged at about the same time and drew on a similar blend of punk and Irish folk music, but that the Pogues were "influenced by the ballad tradition, Clancy Brothers and the Dubliners in particular, whereas our influences are the jigs and reels of the instrumental music, broadened out to music from many different places, and then also the traditional songs, but on the dark side."

=== 1980s and early 1990s: Hotheads, From the Ladle to the Grave, Orb ===
A new singer/guitarist, Todd Menton, joined for the band's second album, Hotheads, which saw the band expanding beyond its Celtic-rock roots into both punkier and more eclectic world-music sounds. Flute player Laura MacKenzie joined as an official member briefly in 1986, and played as a guest on several subsequent albums.

Dauphin and Griffin left in 1988, and percussionist Robin Adnan Anders joined, bringing an even more diverse range of world-music elements into play for the band's third album From the Ladle to the Grave.

Stenshoel departed before the band recorded 1990's Orb, though he is a guest musician on several tracks. Orb found Boiled in Lead exploring a wider range of traditional music styles than ever before, moving beyond Fairport Convention-influenced Celtic rock and adding material from Albania, Romania, Macedonia, Sweden, Appalachia, and Thailand. The album's title reflects this, suggesting an embrace of a truly global musical perspective. Bassist Drew Miller attributed the widening of the band's sound to the eye-opening realization that their European audiences were just as comfortable with American musical styles as with any European forms. "We came to the decision that since we're Americans, there's no reason we have to play all Irish material. So we don't." Besides the many world-music influences, Orb also delves into punk rock and psychobilly with guitarist/vocalist Todd Menton's "Tape Decks All Over Hell."

In 1991, the band released Old Lead, a compilation of BOiLeD iN lEaD and Hotheads with two previously unreleased tracks recorded during the Hotheads sessions.

=== 1990s: Antler Dance, Songs from The Gypsy ===
Menton left in 1992 and was replaced by Adam Stemple of Cats Laughing, leading the band in a harder-rocking direction on 1994's Antler Dance. The band's 1995 album Songs from the Gypsy was a song cycle written by Stemple and his Cats Laughing bandmate Steven Brust several years before Stemple joined Boiled in Lead. The songs also inspired Brust and Megan Lindholm's novel The Gypsy.

Five Boiled In Lead songs were used on the soundtrack of 1994 independent film Bound and Gagged: A Love Story, including "Arpad's Guz", "Sora", "Cunovo Oro", "Serbian Kolo #3", and "Brave Bombardier", all taken from the album Orb.

For the band's 15th anniversary in 1998, it released a best-of compilation, Alloy, as well as a double-disc set of live songs and rarities, Alloy2. Further lineup changes included the return of Stenshoel in 1997, the departure of Stemple and return of Menton as well as the addition of guitarist Dean Magraw in 2005, Anders' departure in 2008 and new drummer Marc Anderson in 2009.

=== 2010s: Silver, The Well Below ===
Magraw and Anderson left in 2016 and were replaced by percussionist Michael Bissonnette.

After a long absence from recording, the band returned for a 25th-anniversary album titled Silver. The album again featured a strong Celtic flavor but also included Middle Eastern and Algerian influences on songs like "Berber" and "Menfi."

In 2012, Boiled in Lead recorded a four-song EP, The Well Below, which included a cover of Appalachian folk singer Roscoe Holcomb's "Wedding Dress" as well as the band's take on Irish songwriter Christy Moore's murder ballad "The Well Below the Valley."

=== 2020s: 40 Years of Rock 'n' Reel, King of the Dogwoods ===
Michael Bissonnette left the band in 2020, and was replaced in 2023 by drummer Mo Engel, who also plays in Miller's other group Kinda Fonda Wanda and in rockabilly group The Vibro Champs.

David Stenshoel died on September 16, 2021, from squamous cell carcinoma of the gingiva, at age 71. The band played a memorial concert in his honor the following month, with a lineup including both current and former members of the group.

Violinist Haley Olson joined in March 2023.

A live album, 40 Years of Rock 'n' Reel, recorded at the band's March 2023 show at the Parkway Theater in Minneapolis, was released in 2024. It is the group's first recording featuring its most recent lineup, and in fact was the lineup's first public performance.

On March 8, 2026, it was reported that former Boiled in Lead drummer Robin Anders had died. He had been living in rural northern Minnesota for several years. The news was relayed by the official Boiled in Lead Facebook page, as well as former lead singer Adam Stemple.

In 2026, Boiled in Lead released its eighth full-length studio album, King of the Dogwoods, its first work of all-new material in 14 years. The band also released three music videos, for the songs "King of the Dogwoods", "Je T'aime Helena," and "Bold Lovell." It was reviewed positively in the music press, including a rave from the website Americana Highways calling it one of the best albums of 2026.

Olson left the band in July 2026, and the group continued as a trio consisting of Miller, Menton, and Engel.

In September 2026, Boiled in Lead announced that the band would be going on indefinite hiatus, with a final show at Crooners Supper Club in Minneapolis scheduled for October 31. In the message, the band thanked its former members (including the late David Stenshoel and Robin Anders), supporters, and fans. The announcement ended with a message in Gaelic, Thig crìoch air an t-saoghal, ach mairidh gaol is ceòl, or in English, "The world may come to an end, but love and music will last forever."

== In popular culture ==
The band has had a cross-pollinating creative relationship with a number of writers in the Twin Cities fantasy scene, most obviously in the interplay between the band's 1995 album Songs from the Gypsy and Steven Brust and Megan Lindholm's novel The Gypsy. Additionally, the character Aibynn in Brust's novel Phoenix is based on Anders, who was Brust's drum teacher.

Both Boiled in Lead and the Hotheads album appear in Emma Bull's 1987 urban fantasy novel War for the Oaks; the band itself has a cameo as the opening act for the protagonists' climactic performance at Minneapolis nightclub First Avenue, while the album appears during a quieter moment earlier in the book, when the main character plays the record while having a conversation.

Barth Anderson's 2008 novel The Magician and the Fool features an appearance by the band playing a gig in a scene set in a Minneapolis restaurant.

== Members ==
=== Current members ===
- Drew Miller – bass (1983–present), vocals (1983–1985)
- Todd Menton – vocals, guitar (1985–1992, 2005–present)
- Mo Engel – drums (2023–present)
- Haley Olson – violin, fiddle (2023–present)

=== Former members ===
- Robin Adnan Anders – drums (1988–2009)
- Marc Anderson – drums (2009–2016)
- Michael Bissonnette – drums (2016–2020)
- Amos Box – drums (1983)
- Jane Dauphin – vocals, guitar (1983–1988)
- Brian Fox – violin, fiddle (1983–1985)
- Mitch Griffin – drums (1983–1988)
- Josef Kessler – violin, fiddle (1992–1997)
- Laura MacKenzie – flute (1986)
- Dean Magraw – guitar (2005–2016)
- Michael Ravaz – violin, fiddle (1990–1992)
- Adam Stemple – vocals, guitar (1992–2005)
- David Stenshoel – violin, fiddle (1983–1990, 1997–2021)

== Awards and honors ==
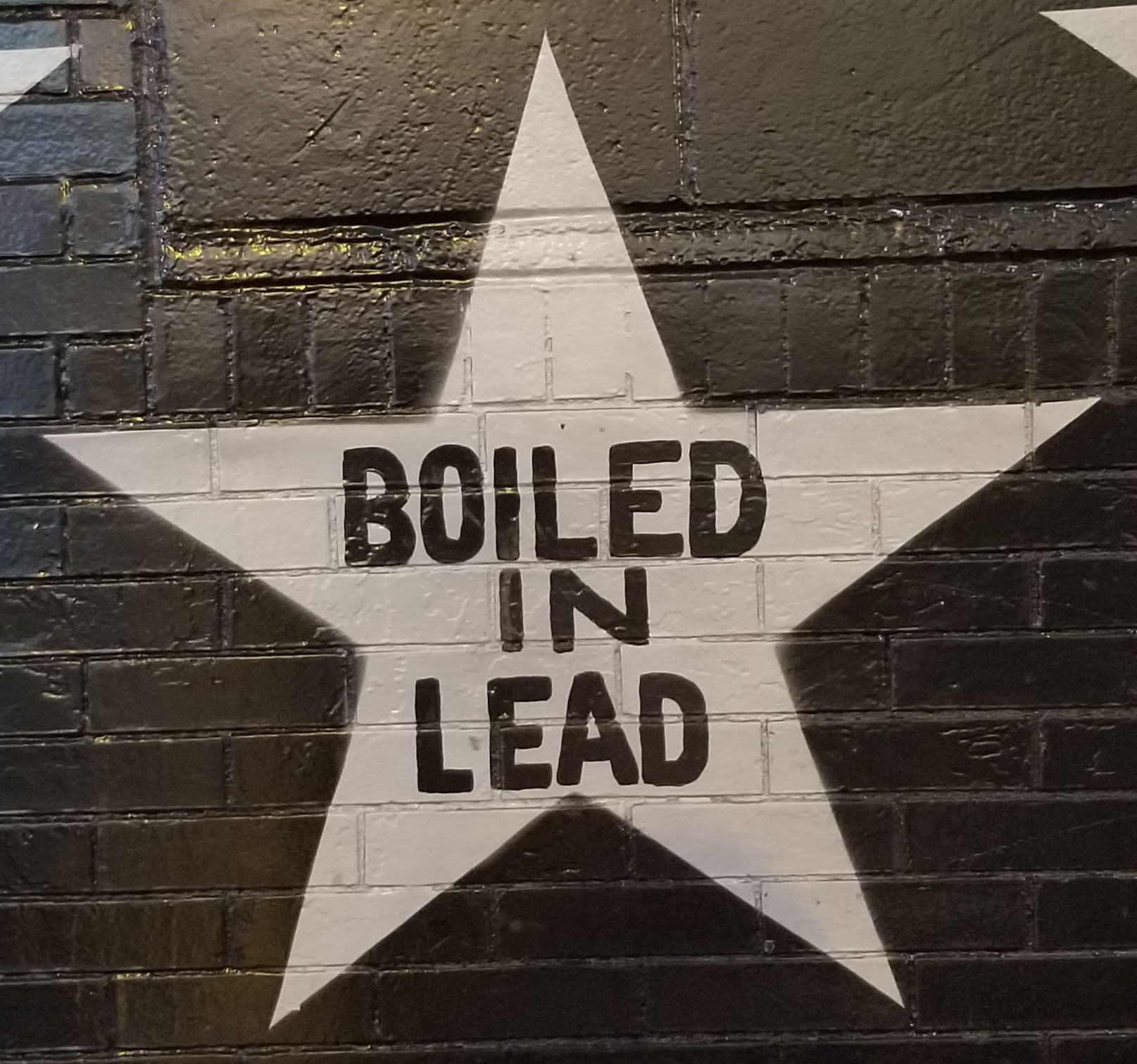
Boiled in Lead's star on the outside mural of the Minneapolis nightclub First Avenue

Boiled in Lead has won multiple Minnesota Music Awards: Hotheads won for Best Celtic/Bluegrass/Folk Album in 1987, and From the Ladle to the Grave won Album/CD of the Year in 1989.

The band has been honored with a star on the outside mural of the Minneapolis nightclub First Avenue, recognizing performers that have played sold-out shows or have otherwise demonstrated a major contribution to the culture at the iconic venue. Receiving a star "might be the most prestigious public honor an artist can receive in Minneapolis," according to journalist Steve Marsh.

== Discography ==
=== Studio albums and EPs ===
- Boiled in Lead (The Crack, 1985)
- Hotheads (Atomic Theory, 1987)
- From the Ladle to the Grave (Atomic Theory/Cooking Vinyl, 1989)
- Orb (Atomic Theory/Cooking Vinyl, 1990)
- Antler Dance (Omnium, 1994)
- Songs from The Gypsy (Omnium, 1995)
- Silver (Omnium, 2008)
- The Well Below EP (Omnium, 2012)
- King of the Dogwoods (Omnium, 2026)

=== Compilations and live albums ===
- Boiled Alive (The Crack, 1984, cassette release)
- Old Lead (Omnium, 1991)—a collection of BOiLeD iN lEaD and Hotheads
- Boiled Alive '92 (The Crack, 1992, cassette release)
- Alloy: A Fifteen-Year Collection (Omnium, 1998)
- Alloy2 (Omnium, 1998)
- 40 Years of Rock 'n' Reel (Omnium, 2024)

=== Singles ===
- "Fück The Circus" (Susstones/Omnium, 1994)

== Solo projects and associated bands ==
Besides the band's connection to Cats Laughing and Steven Brust, several members of Boiled in Lead have also released solo projects and work with other bands:

Miller formed the group Felonious Bosch in 2003 with members of other Twin Cities bands including drummer Renee Bracchi of The Blue Up? and Machinery Hill, blending European medieval music with rock on a 2003 self-titled EP and the albums New Dark Ages (2006), Toybox (2010), and 2012's The Bent Slinky Session and Phenomena. The band also performed on the audio book of the 2011 urban fantasy anthology Welcome To Bordertown, part of the Borderland series by Terry Windling, backing author Steven Brust on a reading of his poem "Run Back Across The Border". Miller also produced five additional tracks on the audio book, creating backing music with Stenshoel and Bosch singer Kari Tauring for poems by Jane Yolen and Neil Gaiman, among others. The group disbanded in 2012. Miller is also part of Paris 1919, an avant-garde musical collective led by Chris Strouth. Miller formed Kinda Fonda Wanda, a rockabilly group inspired by Wanda Jackson, in 2018; the group has released one album, Aces, in 2022.
Menton has released four solo albums: 2003's Punts, 2004's Where Will You Land?, 2008's The Dolmen Field, and 2015's "Rosie in the Stars".
Anders has recorded three solo albums under his own name, 1995's Blue Buddha, 1998's Omaiyo, and 2003's Cantar Tambor Bailar: To Sing to Drum to Dance as well as three with the group Darbuki Kings, 2006's Doumtekastan, 2008's Lawrence of Suburbia, and 2009's Been Laden You Too Long. He has also performed with Iowa folk musician Greg Brown on the albums Dream Cafe and The Poet Game, and played on the 1989 3 Mustaphas 3 album Heart of Uncle.
Marc Anderson has recorded as a sideman on dozens of other artists' albums including Steve Tibbetts and Peter Ostroushko, and released two albums of his own work, 1993's Timefish and 2002's Ruby.
Stemple released a solo album, 3 Solid Blows To the Head, in 2006.
Magraw performed in a duo for many years with Peter Ostroushko and has also performed with Tim Sparks, John Gorka and many other artists. He has released seven solo albums.
