= Teresa Nielsen Hayden =

American editor and writer

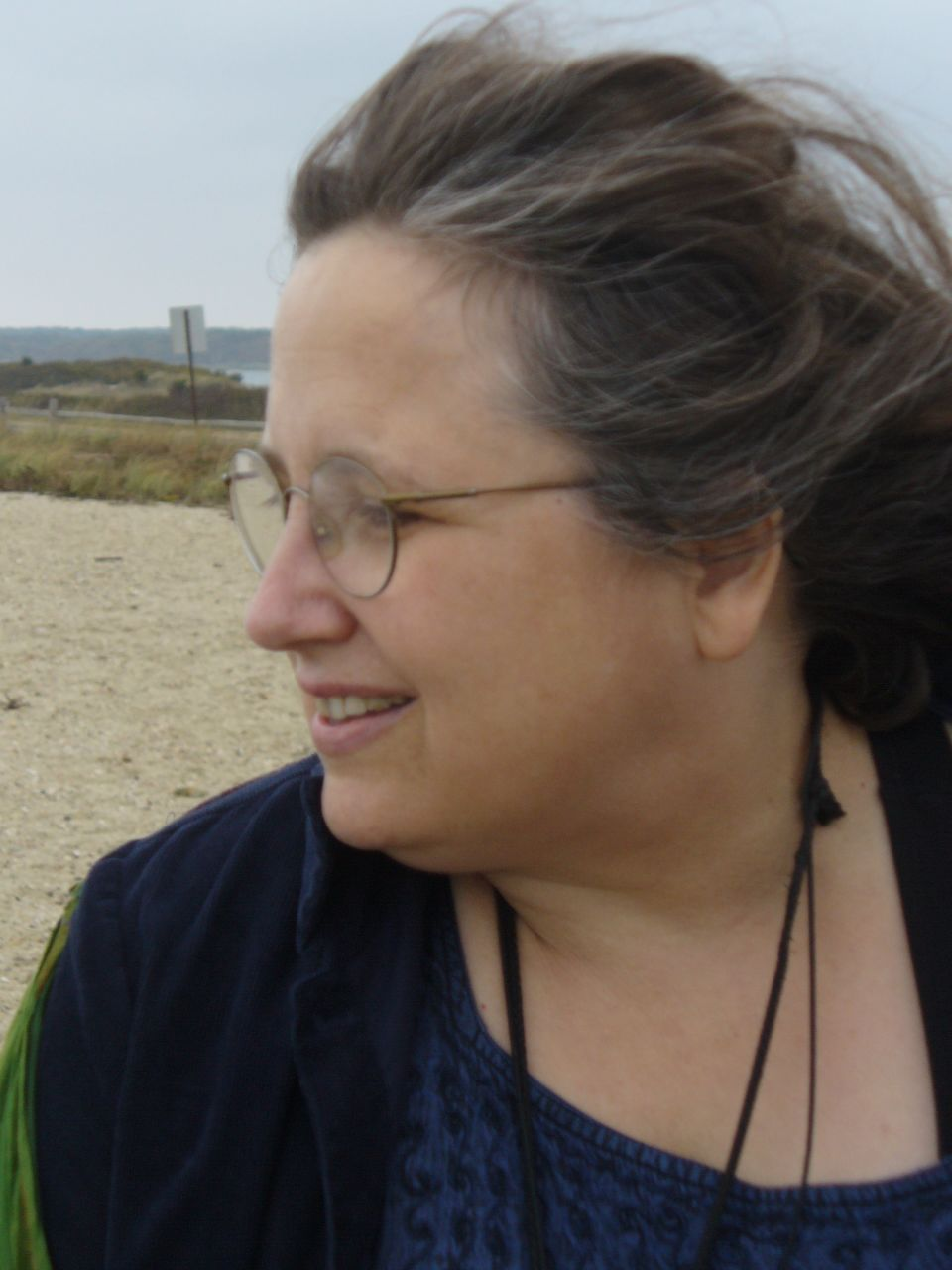
- Teresa Nielsen Hayden in 2006
- Born: March 21, 1956 (age 70)
- Occupation: Editor
- Spouse: Patrick Nielsen Hayden
- Writing career
- Genres: Non-fiction (writer); science fiction, fantasy (editor)
- Website: www.nielsenhayden.com

Teresa Nielsen Hayden (born March 21, 1956) is an American science fiction editor, fanzine writer, essayist, and workshop instructor. She is a consulting editor for Tor Books and is well known for her weblog, Making Light. She has also worked for Federated Media Publishing, when in 2007 she was hired to revive the comment section for the blog Boing Boing. Nielsen Hayden has been nominated for Hugo Awards five times.

== Early life ==
Born Teresa Nielsen, she grew up in a Mormon household in Mesa, Arizona.

== Career ==
From 1985 to 1989, she served on the editorial board of The Little Magazine, a poetry magazine.

She is a former managing editor and a former consulting editor at Tor Books. In 1994, a collection of her essays, Making Book (ISBN 0-915368-55-2), was published by NESFA Press. It is now in its third printing. The second printing is the preferred edition.

She is also one of the regular instructors for the writing workshop Viable Paradise.

Nielsen Hayden is well known for her weblog, Making Light, where she writes about subjects such as animal hoarding, publishing scams, astroturfing, and global political events. She is the first recorded Internet editor to practice disemvoweling of the entire text of offensive posts; the term itself was coined in a Making Light post by Arthur Hlavaty. She was the first lead comments moderator at the popular blog Boing Boing when it reopened its comments feature in 2007. In June 2008, a controversy on Boing Boing concerning the "unpublication" of all articles that mention sex columnist Violet Blue generated criticism of some of her moderation techniques, including disemvowelment.

== Personal life ==
Teresa Nielsen appended Hayden to her name upon marrying the former Patrick Hayden in 1979; he also took her name, becoming Patrick Nielsen Hayden. The two of them were active members of science fiction fandom and collaborated on various fanzines, including the Hugo-nominated Izzard. In 1985, Nielsen Hayden and her husband were TransAtlantic Fan Fund delegates to Europe for Eastercon. Over the next few years, the Nielsen Haydens published at least three TAFF trip reports.

She was excommunicated from the Church of Jesus Christ of Latter-day Saints in 1980 for her support of the Equal Rights Amendment. In her youth, she served as a page in the Arizona House of Representatives.

Nielsen Hayden has narcolepsy, for which she had been taking pemoline until the Food and Drug Administration withdrew the drug from the marketplace. In September 2008 she had what appeared to be a heart attack; paramedics were summoned immediately, and she made a full recovery.

== Hugo Award nominations ==
- 1995 nominee for Hugo Award for Best Non-Fiction Book for Making Book
- 1991 nominee for Hugo Award for Best Fan Writer
- 1989 co-nominee for Hugo Award for Best Semiprozine for The New York Review of Science Fiction
- 1984 nominee for Hugo Award for Best Fan Writer
- 1984 co-nominee, with Patrick Nielsen Hayden, for Hugo Award for Best Fanzine for Izzard

== Books edited ==
- Poul Anderson: Alight in the Void
- Steven Brust: Dragon, Issola, Dzur, The Paths of the Dead, The Lord of Castle Black, Sethra Lavode, Jhegaala, Iorich, Tiassa, The Incrementalists, Hawk
- Avram Davidson: The Avram Davidson Treasury (Locus poll winner, Best Collection, 1999)
- Samuel R. Delany: Wagner/Artaud: A Play of 19th and 20th Century Critical Fictions (published with Patrick Nielsen Hayden under the imprint Ansatz Press, 1988)
- John M. Ford: The Last Hot Time
- Shariann Lewitt: Memento Mori, Interface Masque, Rebel Sutra
- Jane Lindskold: The Buried Pyramid, Child of a Rainless Year, Through Wolf's Eyes, Wolf's Head, Wolf's Heart, The Dragon of Despair, Wolf Captured, Wolf Hunting, Wolf's Blood
- James D. Macdonald and Debra Doyle: The Stars Asunder
- Terry McGarry: The Binder's Road, Triad
- Douglas Morgan: Tiger Cruise
- Harry Turtledove: Conan of Venarium, The Breath of God
- James White: The Galactic Gourmet, Mind Changer, Final Diagnosis, Double Contact
- Charles Vess: The Book of Ballads
- Robert Charles Wilson: Darwinia (Prix Aurora Award winner, 1999), Blind Lake (Prix Aurora Award winner, 2004), Spin (Hugo Award winner, 2006), Axis, Julian Comstock, Vortex, Burning Paradise

== Bibliography ==
- Making Book. NESFA Press. March 1994. ISBN 978-0915368556.
- "Some Notes Toward Two Analyses of Auctorial Method and Voice". The Paths of the Dead: Book One of the Viscount of Adrilankha. Tor Books. 2002. ISBN 978-0312864781.
- "Remarks on Some Cliches I Have (By Definition) Known Too Well". Subterranean Magazine #4. Subterranean Press. 2006.
- Chapter 15. Lulu Press. 2005. ISBN 978-1411622982.
