= Nielsen Hayden =

Nielsen Hayden may refer to:

- Patrick Nielsen Hayden (born 1959), American science-fiction editor
- Teresa Nielsen Hayden (born 1956), American science-fiction editor
