= Dragon (Brust novel) =

1998 novel in the Vlad Taltos series by Steven Brust

- First edition cover
- Author: Steven Brust
- Cover artist: Stephen Hickman
- Language: English
- Series: The Vlad Taltos novels
- Genre: Fantasy
- Publisher: Tor Books
- Publication date: 1998
- Publication place: United States
- Media type: Print (Hardback & Paperback)
- Pages: 288
- ISBN: 0-312-86692-5
- OCLC: 39013839
- Dewey Decimal: 813/.54 21
- LC Class: PS3552.R84 D73 1998
- Preceded by: Orca
- Followed by: Issola

Dragon is a fantasy novel by American writer Steven Brust, the eighth book in Vlad Taltos series, published in 1998 by Tor Books. It is both the second and fourth book of the series in chronological order, largely occurring after Taltos and before Yendi, with brief interludes taking place shortly after the events of Yendi. Following the trend of the Vlad Taltos books, it is named after one of the Great Houses in Brust's fantasy world of Dragaera and features that House as an important element to its plot.

== Plot introduction ==
Vlad joins Morrolan's army and fights in a war against a rival Dragonlord.

== Plot summary ==
The plot cuts between three timelines. The first timeline follows Vlad's actions at the final battle of a war he has joined. The second follows the events that lead up to the battle. The third marks the events after the battle. Each chapter begins in the first timeline, then switches to the second, while several interludes and the epilogue trace the third.

=== The Provocation ===
Several weeks after the events of Taltos, the Dragon wizard Baritt is killed. Morrolan then hires Vlad to protect a cache of Morganti weapons in Baritt's home. Vlad sees to the job with the help of a psychic Hawklord named Daymar. When one of the weapons, an unremarkable greatsword, is stolen, Vlad traces the theft to Fornia, an ambitious Dragonlord who neighbors Morrolan's domain. Morrolan is not sure whether the weapon is actually valuable, or if the theft is merely an excuse to start a war, but he resolves to fight Fornia regardless. When Fornia sends a few thugs to intimidate Vlad at his home (a big taboo for Jhereg in the Organization), Vlad recklessly offers his help to Morrolan in the upcoming war.

Vlad and Morrolan attend Baritt's funeral service, where they meet Fornia. The two sides square off and Morrolan delivers the necessary insult to start the war. Vlad insults Fornia as well, publicly committing himself to the war. After the conversation, Morrolan deduces that Fornia values the stolen sword for some reason. To learn more, Morrolan takes Vlad to meet a Serioli. The Serioli tells them that the stolen sword might be a Great Weapon, and that Vlad's magical chain, Spellbreaker, is a piece of a Great Weapon as well.

=== The War ===
Vlad leaves his operation in the hands of his lieutenant, Kragar, and joins Morrolan's army. Morrolan places him in Cropper Company, an elite unit consisting mostly of Dragonlords, which he places in the vanguard so that Vlad will be close to Fornia's base of operations. Vlad mixes with his fellow soldiers and finds that most of them are surprisingly courteous despite their personal distaste for Easterners. Vlad adjusts to military life and has long conversations about soldiering, military philosophy, and the differences between Dragons and Jhereg. During the first battle, Vlad finds that he cannot bring himself to abandon his new comrades as he had planned. Throughout the campaign he fights bravely and takes several wounds, earning the respect of his comrades. He also makes a name for himself by performing a few acts of nighttime sabotage in the enemy camp, which he finds more suited to his skills than pitched combat.

The final battle begins, which is the start of the first timeline. Vlad avoids the fighting and infiltrates the enemy base. He openly approaches Fornia and his honor guard, who take him prisoner. Vlad summons Daymar in an effort to mind-read Fornia's plans, but Fornia blocks him. As Morrolan's forces near, one of Vlad's comrades arrives to help him. Fornia becomes distracted and Vlad leads his small band in a charge at Fornia's position. Vlad kills Fornia's main sorcerer while his comrade attacks Fornia and is killed by the Morganti greatsword. Vlad kills Fornia, tosses the greatsword towards Morrolan, and runs.

=== The Aftermath ===
In the third timeline, Vlad has returned home from war. He learns that Sethra the Younger picked up the greatsword and claimed it as spoils of war, but she could not discover any hidden power within it. She has given up and wants to trade the greatsword for the sword of Kieron the Conqueror, which is now owned by Morrolan's cousin Aliera. Vlad reluctantly arranges a meeting at his house, but the meeting quickly turns violent. Vlad summons Morrolan, who crosses Blackwand with Sethra's greatsword. The greatsword shatters, revealing within it the shortsword Pathfinder, a Great Weapon. Sethra is sprawled by the blow, and Aliera uses the opportunity to accept Sethra's original proposal and take Pathfinder for herself.

== The House of the Dragon ==
The House of the Dragon is one of the most noble and powerful Great Houses in the Dragaeran Empire. Dragonlords are notoriously militaristic, aggressive, and arrogant. They tend to have black hair, angular features, prominent chins, and noble's points that indicate their nobility. Their House colors are black and silver. Dragonlords are natural soldiers and battle commanders. Periodic service in the Phoenix Guards is mandatory, and Dragonlords make up a bulk of the company's members. Dragons tend to have a rigid sense of honor and glory as well as a keen interest in lineage. While most Dragaerans go only by personal names and titles, Dragonlords use patronymics honoring their most famous ancestor.

The House of the Dragon was named after dragons, huge reptiles that cannot breathe fire but have tentacles that pick up psychic impressions. Symbols of war, they represent the House's aggressive and arrogant nature. The Cycle Poem observes, "Haughty dragon yearns to slay".

== Reception ==
Publishers Weekly called it a "rousing adventure", and noted its "sneaky plot twists". Steven H Silver found the plot to be "much more straight-forward than many of the previous Vlad novels", which he felt allowed Brust to "experiment with story-telling style"; Silver also commended Brust's ability to "portray the terror and hardships of war" while not "show[ing] the brutality of war in detail", as "there is very little sense of gore." At Tor.com, Jo Walton noted that, despite the multiple timelines, the story "flows smoothly and clearly, but very very out of sequence", but cautioned that it is not a suitable introduction to Brust's work, as it "probably works best for a reader already invested in Vlad and his story."
