= Tsalmoth =

2023 novel in the Vlad Taltos series by Steven Brust

- First edition
- Author: Steven Brust
- Language: English
- Series: The Vlad Taltos novels
- Genre: Fantasy novel
- Publisher: Tor Books
- Publication date: April 2023
- Publication place: United States
- Media type: Print (Hardcover)
- Pages: 288
- ISBN: 978-0765382849 (1st ed., hardback)
- Preceded by: Vallista
- Followed by: Lyorn

Tsalmoth is the sixteenth book in Steven Brust's Vlad Taltos series, set in the fantasy world of Dragaera. It was released in April 2023. Following the trend of the series, it is named after one of the Great Houses, and the personality characteristics associated with that House are integral to its plot.

== Plot summary ==
The story is set early in Vlad's career, when he is still working for the criminal Jhereg organization, and is planning his wedding to his fiancé and fellow assassin Cawti. The plot revolves around a sum of money Vlad is owed by a man who is later murdered, and Vlad's attempts to unravel the mystery and get his funds back. In terms of the internal chronology of the series, Tsalmoth is set between the novels Yendi and Jhereg.

== Reception ==
Publishers Weekly gave the book a positive review, saying that "Vlad’s narration is cocky and quick-witted as ever, and it’s a joy to revisit his usual costars."
