= EerieCon =

Multi-genre convention in Niagara Falls, New York

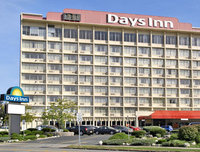
- Days Inn at the Falls (convention site)
- Status: Defunct
- Venue: Days Inn at the Falls
- Locations: Niagara Falls, New York
- Country: United States
- Inaugurated: 1999
- Attendance: 107 in 2010
- Website: eeriecon.org

EerieCon was a non-profit, fan-run science-fiction, fantasy, and horror convention which was held every year until 2016 in Niagara Falls, New York. Guests have included Kevin J. Anderson, Catherine Asaro, Octavia Butler, Hal Clement, Jack McDevitt, Robert J. Sawyer, Harry Turtledove, and Vernor Vinge. The website is no longer live, the convention did not occur in 2017 and has no information about future plans, although they have a Facebook group. The most recent EerieCon (18) took place from September 30 to October 2, 2016.

== Programming ==
Activities at EerieCon typically include panels by the guests of honor, a dealers room, masquerade, poetry round robin, gaming room, con suite, people and thing auction, reading room, autographs, and art show. The convention also includes a video room with a special "anime feature" presentation on Sunday showing popular anime shows of the past year. The convention's most notable event is the "What Line's Mine" panel where a number of guests listen to quotes and try to determine if they, or a different guest, wrote that line. Another recently popular event is Friday Night Karaoke.

== History ==
The convention started out at the Fallside Resort, in Niagara Falls, New York. Eeriecon 2 and 3 were hosted at Days Inn Riverview. Due to some difficulties, the convention had to move one last time, settling into the Days Inn at the Falls starting with at Eeriecon 4 in 2002.

In 2013, Eeriecon 15 changed locations to the Holiday Inn Grand Island on Grand Island, New York. The Holiday Inn on Grand Island changed its name and is now known as Byblos Niagara.

== Guests of honor ==
EerieCon 18
2016, Victor Gischler, Keith R.A. DeCandido

EerieCon 17
2015, Kelley Armstrong, Craig Engler

EerieCon 16
2014, David B. Coe, Mark Leslie

EerieCon 15
2013, Jack McDevitt, Carl Frederick

EerieCon 14
2012, Catherine Asaro, Lois Gresh

EerieCon 13
2011, Larry Niven, Derwin Mak

EerieCon 12
2010, Kevin J. Anderson, Rebecca Moesta

EerieCon 11
2009, John-Allen Price, Vernor Vinge

EerieCon 10
2008, Allen Steele, Steven Brust, Julie Czerneda

EerieCon 9
2007, Steven Brust, Nancy Kress, James Alan Gardner

EerieCon 8
2006, Harry Turtledove, Tanya Huff, Esther Friesner

EerieCon 7
2005, Allen Steele, Steven Brust, Julie Czerneda

EerieCon 6
2004, Larry Niven, Anne Bishop, Brian Lumley

EerieCon 5
2003, Jack McDevitt, Lynn Flewelling

EerieCon 4
2002, Octavia Butler, Darrell Schweitzer

EerieCon 3
2001, Hal Clement, Robert J. Sawyer

EerieCon 2
2000, Mike Resnick, Edo van Belkom

EerieCon 1
1999, Brian Lumley, Josepha Sherman

== Recurring guests ==
- Anne Bishop
- Carolyn Clink
- David DeGraff
- Derwin Mak
- John-Allen Price
- Robert J. Sawyer
- Josepha Sherman
- Edo Van Belkom

== Chapbook ==
Fourteen EerieCon chapbooks have been published to date. Each one has a variety of authors, some authors being published in more than one of the chapbooks. #3 is out of print.

Chapbook 1
"Gravity Isn't Working on Rainbow Bridge" by Jack McDevitt

Chapbook 2
"Folks From Away" by Lynn Flewelling

Chapbook 3
"Rapunzel" by Anne Bishop, "The Lecture" by Brian Lumley, "Lost" by Larry Niven

Chapbook 4
"Klava With Honey: A Prologue" by Steven Brust, "What Sleeps in the Shadows" by Julie E. Czerneda, "An Incident at the Luncheon of the Boating Party" by Allen M. Steele

Chapbook 5
"The Fairies' Midwife" by Esther M. Friesner, "Tuesday Evenings, Six-Thirty to Seven" by Tanya Huff, "The Eagle Has Landed" by Robert J. Sawyer, "Black Tulip" by Harry Turtledove

Chapbook 6
"Chapter One" by Steven Brust, "All in the Timing" by James Alan Gardner, "Product Development" by Nancy Kress, "Sword Play" by Josepha Sherman

Chapbook 7
"The Naked Truth" by Joe Haldeman, "Lying Eyes" by Sephera Giron, "The Plagiarist Thief" by Edo Van Belkom

Chapbook 8
"Here's to You, Joe DiMaggio" by John Allan Price, "A Dry Martini" by Vernor Vinge

Chapbook 9
"Collaborators" by Kevin J. Anderson & Rebecca Moesta, "The Maid of Orion's Colony" by Jennifer Crow, "The Abdication of Pope Mary III" by Robert J. Sawyer

Chapbook 10
"Doubling Rate" by Larry Niven & "Willpower" by Derwin Mak. Cover and interior illustrations by Charles Momberger. Paper cover edition limited to 110 copies.

Chapbook 11
Two stories by Marion Zimmer Bradley: "Adventure in Charin" and "Moonfire". Both reprinted from their original appearance (circa 1952) in fanzines published two early BFL members. Cover and interior illustrations by Charles Momberger who did the illos for the original mimeographed fanzines. Paper cover edition limited to 110 copies.

Chapbook 12
Fiction by Catherine Asaro and Lois Gresh; poems by Carolyn Clink and David Clink. Charles Momberger illustrations. Paper cover edition limited to 105 signed copies.

Chapbook 13
Fiction by Jack McDevitt and Carl Frederick, including two stories by Frederick. Cover and interior illustrations by Charles Momberger. Limited to 100 copies, 12 hard cover and 88 paper.

Chapbook 14
Fiction by Mark Leslie and David B. Coe.
