= Lyorn =

2024 novel in the Vlad Taltos series by Steven Brust

- Author: Steven Brust
- Language: English
- Series: The Vlad Taltos novels
- Genre: Fantasy novel
- Publisher: Tor Books
- Publication date: April 9, 2024
- Publication place: United States
- Media type: Print (Hardcover)
- Pages: 273
- ISBN: 978-0765382863 (1st ed., hardback)
- Preceded by: Tsalmoth

Lyorn is the seventeenth book in Steven Brust's Vlad Taltos series, set in the fantasy world of Dragaera. It was released in April 9, 2024. Following the trend of the series, it is named after one of the Great Houses, and the personality characteristics associated with that House are integral to its plot.

== Plot summary ==
The story follows Vlad as he hides in a theater from the sorceresses of the Left Hand of the Jhereg, who want to kill him for events that happened in the conclusion of the 2014 novel Hawk. Vlad's scheme to get himself out of trouble ends up involving many of his old associates, in particular Sethra Lavode and Kragar, as well as the play being staged by the theatrical company that's sheltering him. Like most of the novels in the series, it is told largely from Vlad's point of view, but atypically, also includes several third-person scenes establishing important character viewpoints for others in the plot, as well as a running gag featuring Dragaeran-themed parodies of famous songs from musicals and stage plays such as “I Am the Very Model of a Modern Major General.”

In terms of the internal chronology of the series, Lyorn takes place just after Hawk. The books published in between the two, Vallista and Tsalmoth, were both flashback books whose events occurred earlier in Vlad's life.

== Reception ==
Publishers Weekly gave the book a positive review, calling it "a wonderful installment that combines theatricality, crime, Vlad’s trademark wise-cracking, and portents of world-changing events." Reviewer Steven H. Silver noted that the book's focus on moving the Dragaera series' overall plot arc forward means that "it can be more thoroughly enjoyed with knowledge of the entire series of books." B. Morris Allen of Metaphorosis Reviews was more critical, saying that "I think Brust is a talented author, but it feels like he’s been coasting for years now – maybe decades – and it’s been a long time since I could count him as a true favorite."
