= Taltos =

Taltos may refer to:

- Táltos, in Hungarian tradition a human being similar to a shaman, or alternately the horse of such a person, called the Táltos Horse
- Taltos (Brust novel), a 1988 novel by Steven Brust
- Taltos (Rice novel), a 1994 novel by Anne Rice
