= Dzur =

Dzur may refer to:

- Martin Dzúr (1919–1985), Czechoslovak defense minister from 1968 to 1985
- Walter Dzur (1919–1999), German international football player
- Dzur (novel), by Steven Brust
