= Good Guys =

Good Guys or The Good Guys may refer to:

- Good guy, a hero
- Good guy, a nice guy

== Books ==
- Good Guys (Brust novel), a 2018 novel by Steven Brust
- The Good Guy, a 2007 thriller novel by Dean Koontz
- The Good Guys (comics), a comic book series that was published from 1993 to 1994
- The Good Guys, a novel by Salvatore Bonanno, Joseph Pistone and David Fisher

== Film and television ==
- Good Guys, a brand of murderous dolls from the Child's Play horror film franchise
- Operation Good Guys, a British mockumentary
- The Good Guy (film), a 2009 romantic-comedy film
- The Good Guys (1968 TV series), an American sitcom that ran on CBS from 1968 to 1970
- The Good Guys (British TV series), a British comedy-drama featuring David Langton that ran from 1992 to 1993
- The Good Guys (2010 TV series), an American buddy-cop comedy-drama on Fox that debuted and ended in 2010

== Music ==
- "Good Guy", a 2018 song by Eminem
- “Good Guy”, (Zayn song)
- Good Guys (album), a 2012 album by Bucky Covington
- "Good Guys", a 2015 song by Mika released as a promotional single
- The Good Guys, a slogan used for disc jockeys on American top-40 radio stations in the 1960s
  - WMCA (AM) (New York City)
  - WTOB (Winston-Salem, North Carolina)
  - WKSN (Jamestown, New York)

== Business ==
- Good Guys (American company), a former chain of consumer electronics retail stores in the United States
- The Good Guys (Australian company), a chain of consumer electronics retail stores in Australia and New Zealand
