= Skiffy =

Skiffy is a deliberate humorous misspelling or mispronunciation of the controversial term "sci-fi", a neologism referring to science fiction.

The term "sci-fi" was suggested as an abbreviated term for "science fiction" by Forrest J Ackerman in 1954, in analogy to the then-cutting edge term "hi-fi" (for audio high fidelity). Ackerman was a long-time fan, and at the time was the literary agent for science fiction authors Ray Bradbury, Isaac Asimov, A. E. van Vogt, Curt Siodmak and L. Ron Hubbard. Ackerman pronounced his new term as /ˈsaɪˌfaɪ/ or "sigh figh". In the 1970s, some members of science fiction fandom began to pronounce the term /ˈskɪfi/ or "skiffy" for unclear reasons.

Peter Nicholls writes that "SF" (or "sf") is "the preferred abbreviation within the community of sf writers and readers." David Langford's monthly fanzine Ansible includes a regular section "As Others See Us" which offers numerous examples of "sci-fi" and "skiffy" being used in a pejorative sense by people outside the genre.

Skiffy is the name of the science fiction and fantasy club at the College of William & Mary, and VCU, as well as a not always affectionate shorthand for the American cable channel once named the Sci-Fi Channel.

In 1998, Mike Resnick and Patrick Nielsen Hayden released a book called Alternate Skiffy. In keeping with the tongue-in-cheek intent of the term, this was an anthology featuring stories about what might have happened if the lives of various well-known science fiction writers had turned out differently.
