= Skyler White (disambiguation) =

Skyler White is a fictional character from the television series Breaking Bad.

Skyler White may also refer to:

- Skyler White (writer) (born 1967), American fantasy and science fiction, romance, and erotica novelist
- Skyler White (basketball) (born 1993), player for George Washington Colonials and Idaho Vandals men's college basketball teams
