= Phoenix (novel) =

1990 novel in the Vlad Taltos series by Steven Brust

- First edition cover
- Author: Steven Brust
- Cover artist: Denis Beauvais
- Language: English
- Series: The Vlad Taltos novels
- Genre: Fantasy
- Publisher: Ace Books
- Publication date: October 1990
- Publication place: United States
- Media type: Print (paperback)
- Pages: 245 (first edition, paperback)
- ISBN: 0-441-66225-0 (first edition, paperback)
- OCLC: 22620397
- Preceded by: Taltos
- Followed by: Athyra

Phoenix is a fantasy novel by American writer Steven Brust, the fifth book in his Vlad Taltos series, set in the fantasy world of Dragaera. Originally published in 1990 by Ace Books, it was reprinted in 2002 along with Taltos in the omnibus The Book of Taltos. Following the trend of the Vlad Taltos books, it is named after one of the Great Houses and features that house as an important element to its plot.

== Plot summary ==
During an unusual attempt on his life, Vlad prays to his goddess Verra for aid and surprisingly receives it. As payment, Verra requests that Vlad kill the King of Greenaere, an island kingdom off the coast of the Empire, where magic does not work. Vlad agrees and sails to Greenaere, where he completes the assassination without difficulty. Fleeing the island, however, proves more difficult. After fighting off some guards, an injured Vlad stumbles upon a drummer in the forest named Aibynn who tends his wounds and tries to cover for him when more guards arrive. Vlad faints from Aibynn's dreamgrass and reveals his hidden location, causing the guards to arrest both of them.

In prison, Vlad talks with Aibynn, who thinks of nothing but drumming, and waits for an opportunity to escape. Eventually he learns that Loiosh had flown across the ocean to warn their friends. Aliera and Cawti arrive at the prison and free Vlad using elder sorcery, which does not require a link to the Orb. Vlad brings Aibynn along, though he suspects that he might be a spy. Morrolan provides a boat and the group sails away.

Back in Adrilankha, Vlad is still stuck between the Jhereg Organization and his wife's group of Easterner and Teckla revolutionists. Vlad's superior warns him that members of the Council are displeased with the situation. Matters worsen when Greenaere declares war on the Empire and press gangs begin forcibly recruiting Easterners. A watchtower in South Adrilankha is destroyed, and most of the high-ranking revolutionists are arrested, including Cawti.

Vlad suspects that the Jhereg are involved in the arrest. After threatening the Jhereg representative at the Capital, Vlad pursues Boralinoi, the Council member whose territory includes Vlad's and South Adrilankha. Boralinoi confirms that he framed the revolutionists and a fight breaks out in his office. Vlad escapes, but knows that the council will be targeting him for assassination. He is summoned before the Empress and convinces her to have Cawti released.

Vlad goes to South Adrilankha to visit his grandfather, whom he calls Noish-pa, at his shop. After a heartfelt conversation about Vlad's growing self-doubt, Noish-pa warns Vlad of an assassin waiting outside the shop. Vlad exits the shop and kills the assassin with the help of Loiosh. As he flees the murder scene, Vlad becomes aware of a menacing charge in the South Adrilankha residents. After Vlad stumbles upon a slain Phoenix Guard, a riot breaks out. Vlad remembers only short flashes of the violence, but mostly avoids taking part in it. He makes his way back to Noish-pa, who has killed several Phoenix Guards but allowed a female soldier to escape. Vlad convinces Noish-pa to teleport with him to safety at Castle Black.

At Castle Black, Morrolan tells Vlad that the riot turned into a revolt, including a short siege on the Imperial Palace. Cawti has been arrested again, this time for treason. While angered by the Empire's brutal suppression of the revolt, Vlad is agonized by the inevitable execution Cawti faces. He visits the Empress again and strikes a deal: he will testify to Boralinoi's framing of Cawti before the Orb and single-handedly end the war with Greenaere in exchange for the pardon of Cawti and her the revolutionists. By testifying, Vlad commits the ultimate sin in the Organization, ending his career and branding him for death. Testifying in public, "under the orb," (which can detect falsehoods) is what ultimately sets the Jhereg Council against him. His previous acts of threatening the lives of his immediate superior in the Jhereg, Toronnan, and his boss' boss, Lord Boralinoi, as well as the Jhereg representative at court, Count Soffta, got the Jhereg to put out a (non-Morganti) contract on him but, given the nature of the organization, Vlad would have been "forgiven" had he "won" his war. But nobody gives open evidence about the Jhereg in public, much less in testimony before the Empress, and lives (except, it seems, Vlad). After his testimony, the contract is revised to be executed with a Morganti weapon, which would destroy Vlad's soul forever.

Vlad executes his second obligation with the help of his Dragaeran friends. Together they penetrate Greenaere's magic barrier and teleport outside the Greenaere throne room. Vlad negotiates a peace treaty during a tense stand-off, but the new King wants vengeance on the one responsible for ordering his father killed. Vlad knows that this last stipulation is impossible, but sends the treaty to the Empress. Vlad offers himself to the King, but before he can be executed, the Empress has Boralinoi sent back, claiming him to be the mastermind of the assassination. Vlad kills him for the King, satisfying the terms of the peace treaty. The King still orders Vlad to be killed, but he escapes with the help of his friends. Aibynn begins drumming and inadvertently contacts Verra, who rescues the group.

The Empress frees all the revolutionists and honors Vlad with the title of Count Szurke. He gives his primary businesses to his loyal lieutenant, Kragar. Following Cawti's second release, Vlad and Cawti acknowledge that Cawti has changed and they no longer love each other as they first did. He lets her know that he gives her all his South Adrilankha interests, and leaves her for Castle Black, where he convinces Noish-pa to live in his new county. After these arrangements, Vlad flees Adrilankha to avoid Jhereg vengeance. As he sets out, he wonders what his new life will have in store for him.

== Background ==
- The novel is broken into three titled books. The chapters are called "Lessons" and their titles describe what Vlad learns.
- Brust wrote this novel with the intention of taking a long break from writing about Vlad, but this did not happen.
- The character Aibynn is based on Brust's drum teacher, Robin Anders. The members of Aibynn's band are also Tuckerisms of Anders's band, Boiled in Lead.
- Vlad's line "Across the great salt sea. Out past the horizon. To sail beyond the--" stitches together lines from John Greenleaf Whittier's poem "Kathleen" and Alfred Lord Tennyson's poem "Ulysses".

== The House of the Phoenix ==
House Phoenix is the smallest noble house in the Empire because a Dragaeran is not considered a Phoenix unless an actual phoenix passes overhead at the time of birth. Members of Phoenix are the most noble of all Dragaerans and tend to have an air of majesty. Their house color is gold, and they usually have gold hair and eyes. Phoenix is the first house in the Cycle, and thus each Phoenix Emperor is responsible for beginning the cycle anew. Most become decadent at the end of their reigns, but every seventeenth cycle the decadent Phoenix is followed by a "reborn" Phoenix who never sinks to decadence.

Like the mythological beast, Dragaeran phoenixes are flying creatures that die in flames and resurrect from the ashes, representing the house's role of rebirth, rejuvenation, and decay in the cycle. Phoenix appears twice in the Cycle Poem: at the beginning, "Phoenix sinks into decay", and at the end, "Phoenix rise from ashes gray".
