= Teckla =

1987 fantasy novel by Steven Brust

- First edition cover
- Author: Steven Brust
- Cover artist: Stephen Hickman
- Language: English
- Series: The Vlad Taltos novels
- Genre: Fantasy
- Publisher: Ace Books
- Publication date: January 1987
- Publication place: United States
- Media type: Print (Paperback)
- Pages: 214 (first edition, paperback)
- ISBN: 0-441-79977-9 (first edition, paperback)
- OCLC: 15072384
- Preceded by: Yendi
- Followed by: Taltos

Teckla is a fantasy novel by American writer Steven Brust, the third book in his Vlad Taltos series. Originally printed in 1987 by Ace Books, it was reprinted in 1999 in the omnibus The Book of Jhereg along with Jhereg and Yendi. Following the trend of the Vlad Taltos books, it is named after one of the Great Houses in Brust's fantasy world of Dragaera and features that House as an important element to its plot.

== Plot summary ==
While deciding what to do with the fortune he made after the events of Jhereg, Vlad is alarmed to discover that his wife has joined a group of revolutionaries consisting of Easterners and Teckla from the ghetto of South Adrilankha. One of their members, Franz, has been murdered. Fearing for Cawti's safety, Vlad resolves to investigate the matter. After some aggressive investigation, Vlad learns that the Jhereg boss of South Adrilankha, Herth, ordered the assassination after the revolutionaries attacked his businesses. By getting involved, Vlad becomes a target in the ongoing feud.

Vlad takes the information back to Kelly, the leader of the revolutionaries, but he is unafraid. He plans to not only revolt but to break the Cycle itself. Several of his followers tell Vlad their stories, including a Teckla sorcerer named Paresh, but Vlad is unmoved. He accuses them of parroting Kelly's slogans, which put impossible ideals ahead of individuals. Vlad's relationship becomes strained as Cawti's changing values pull her away from his lifestyle.

Distraught over his failing marriage, Vlad lets his guard down and gets captured by Herth's men. They torture him for information about Cawti and the revolutionaries until Vlad's men rescue him. Jarred by his brush with total helplessness, Vlad becomes temporarily suicidal, but Cawti drugs him before he can harm himself. After awakening, Vlad remains troubled by the incident, but reaffirms his desire to save Cawti and destroy Herth.

Vlad suspects that Herth has sent an assassin after him. He begins casing Kelly's headquarters to watch events unfold and draw out the assassin. The revolutionaries attempt to barricade South Adrilankha and the Phoenix Guards are called in to restore order. Amidst the chaos, the assassin strikes, but Vlad fights him off. Vlad identifies the assassin as Quaysh and hires his own assassin, Ishtvan, to kill Quaysh.

Vlad decides that the only way to save Cawti is to end the revolution by killing Kelly and his top-ranking followers. He sneaks into Kelly's headquarters, but Franz's ghost appears before he can start the job. After conversing with the ghost, Vlad becomes unnerved and abandons the plan. He returns the next day looking for Cawti, but winds up in an ethical debate with Kelly over their respective lifestyles. Kelly's accusations closely mirror Vlad's own self-doubts.

Still committed to saving Cawti from self-destruction with the revolutionaries, Vlad concocts a plan to solve all his problems at once. During another altercation between the revolutionaries and the Phoenix Guard, Vlad tricks Herth into entering Kelly's headquarters. He hopes that Herth would kill Kelly, the revolutionaries would kill Herth, and the Phoenix Guards would kill the revolutionaries. Vlad teleports into the headquarters and recklessly decides to kill Herth himself. Miraculously, Vlad disables all of Herth's bodyguards while Ishtvan kills Herth's assassin and disappears. Kelly convinces Vlad against his better judgment to allow Herth to live.

The next day, Vlad has an epiphany on how to solve his problems. He offers to buy all of Herth's holdings in South Adrilankha, using the remainder of his fortune. Herth agrees and retires from the Organization, thus ending all of his conflicts with Vlad and the revolutionaries. Vlad breaks the news to Cawti and they tearfully embrace. Though many unresolved issues still loom between them, Vlad feels relieved that the most pressing dangers are gone.

== Teckla and Trotsky ==
The events and arguments of this book are acknowledged by Brust to be influenced by his lifelong interest in Marxist theory and practice, especially as advocated by Leon Trotsky. Since Brust is a self-identified "Trotskyist sympathizer," this topic frequently comes up in interviews with him.

== The House of the Teckla ==
The House of the Teckla is the only Great House in the Dragaeran Empire to not have noble status. Over 90% of the Empire's population is Teckla, forming its peasant class. Teckla that live in the cities work as servants and common laborers. They are treated as second-class citizens and assumed to be naturally inferior to members of the Noble Houses. The colors of the Teckla are rustic greens, yellows, and browns. Teckla generally have sturdy frames and round faces, with a lack of a noble's point that reveals their common status. Despite their low station, Teckla still have a reign in the Cycle like all other Houses. Teckla generally take power by revolting against the Orca Emperor and ruling the Empire as a republic.

The House is named after the teckla, a field mouse, symbolizing timidity and fertility. The Cycle Poem, which summarizes the nature of the Houses through their animals' actions, observes, "Frightened teckla hides in grass".
