= Izzard (fanzine) =

Izzard was a science fiction fanzine edited by Patrick Nielsen Hayden and Teresa Nielsen Hayden between 1982 and 1987. It was nominated for the Hugo Award in 1984. Contributors included Terry Carr, Steve Stiles, Greg Benford, Ted White, Greg Pickersgill, Avedon Carol, Dave Langford, Stu Shiffman, Taral Wayne, Ray Nelson and Alexis Gilliland.
