= Vallista =

2017 novel in the Vlad Taltos series by Steven Brust

- First edition
- Author: Steven Brust
- Cover artist: Stephen Hickman
- Language: English
- Series: The Vlad Taltos novels
- Genre: Fantasy novel
- Publisher: Tor Books
- Publication date: October 17, 2017
- Publication place: United States
- Media type: Print (Hardcover)
- Pages: 352
- ISBN: 978-0765324450 (1st ed., hardback)
- Preceded by: Hawk
- Followed by: Tsalmoth

Vallista is the fifteenth book in Steven Brust's Vlad Taltos series, set in the fantasy world of Dragaera. It was released in October 2017. Following the trend of the series, it is named after one of the Great Houses, and the personality characteristics associated with that House are integral to its plot.

== Plot summary ==
This story is set immediately before the events of Hawk. It features the character Devera in a larger role than any previous Vlad novel, with much of the story taking place in a "mysterious, seemingly empty manor" overlooking the Great Sea.
