= Sara King =

American novelist (born 1982)

- Born: 1982 (age 43–44) Fairbanks, Alaska, U.S.
- Occupation: Writer
- Education: Chugiak High School; Odyssey Writing Workshop
- Genre: Fantasy

Sara J. King (born 1982) is an Alaskan Fantasy writer residing in the Alaska Bush. She is currently working on her 11th novel, part of the "After Earth" series.

== History ==
Sara King was born in Fairbanks, Alaska, in 1982. She has remained an Alaskan ever since, graduating from Chugiak High School in 2001 and beginning her full-time writing career shortly thereafter. She is an outdoors enthusiast. Her works have appeared in short-story magazines, including Apex Science Fiction and Horror, BBT Magazine, 47North, and Aberrant Dreams.

In March 2007, King was chosen from a pool of 50 candidates to edit Aberrant Dreams, where she works as a contributing editor.

In August 2007, a 7500-word short piece "The Moldy Dead," a short story spinoff of The Legend of ZERO series, became King's first published short work in Apex Science Fiction and Horror Digest, where it received a positive review.

In March 2008, King joined the Codex Writers Group, an online gathering of professional speculative fiction writers, editors, and agents. Here, she workshopped her short fantasy works "The Sheet-Charmer of Broketoe" and "The Auldhund," which won semi-finalist in the First Quarter 2008 Writers of the Future Contest.

In July 2008, King graduated from the 6-week Odyssey Writing Workshop in New Hampshire. She later served as a guest lecturer for the workshop.

== Bibliography ==
=== Novels ===
==== Aulds of the SPYRE ====
- Form and Function (2016)

==== Guardians of the First Realm ====
- Alaskan Fire (2012), ISBN B0073WZ01C
- Alaskan Fury (2012), ISBN B007P4CY26

==== The Legend of ZERO ====
- Forging Zero (2013)
- Zero Recall (2013)
- Zero's Return (2014)
- Forgotten (2022)
- The Legend of ZERO: Zero Marked: A ZERO World Anthology (2022)

===== The Legend of ZERO short stories =====
- Moldy Dead (2013)
- The Many Misadventures of Flea, Agent of Chaos (2015)
- The Scientist, the Rat, and the Assassin (2016)

==== Millennium Potion ====
- Wings of Retribution (2013), ISBN B007W6RBSE

==== Outer Bounds ====
- Fortune's Rising (2014), ISBN B008HYWOHI
- Fortune's Folly (2016)

==== Terms of Mercy ====
- To the Princess Bound (2012), ISBN B008283TVO

=== Short stories ===
- “Fairy”, Blood, Blade, and Thruster Magazine, Issue #3, October 2007
- “Discerning Tastes”, Aberrant Dreams, January 2008 Issue
- “Twelve-A”, Apex Online, Featured Writer, February 2008
- “Glacial Melt”, Shroud Magazine
- “Face Cards”, Cemetery Dance Magazine
- "Cheap Real Estate", Shroud Magazine
- "Moderator", Neo-Opsis Science Fiction Magazine

== Awards and recognitions ==
In 2001, King received an Honorable Mention from the University of Alaska's 21st Annual Creative Writing Contest for her poetry piece, "Untitled."

King has twice received Honorable Mentions from the Writers of the Future Contest; her first from the First Quarter 2007 contest for her 8,000-word short work "Parasite" and her second in the Fourth Quarter 2007 for the 7,900-word short piece "Fury of the Sphinx". She became a semi-finalist in the contest in the First Quarter 2008 with the 10,000-word novelette "The Auldhund."
