= ReVisions =

2005 alternate history anthology

- Author: Various
- Cover artist: Kenn Brown and Chris Wren
- Language: English
- Genre: Alternate history
- Publisher: DAW Books
- Publication date: 2004
- Publication place: United States
- Media type: Print (paperback)
- Pages: 312 p.
- ISBN: 0-7564-0240-9
- OCLC: 56190707
- Dewey Decimal: 813/.0876208358 22
- LC Class: PS648.S3 R484 2004

ReVisions is a 2004 anthology of alternate history short stories. It is edited by Julie E. Czerneda and Isaac Szpindel.

== Contents ==
Title	Author
"The Resonance of Light"	James Alan Gardner
"Out of China"	Julie E. Czerneda
"Site Fourteen"	Laura Anne Gilman
"Silent Leonardo"	Kage Baker
"A Call from the Wild"	Doranna Durgin
"Axial Axioms"	James Alan Gardner
"The Terminal Solution"	Robin Wayne Bailey
"The Ashbazu Effect"	John G. McDaid
"A Word for Heathens"	Peter Watts
"A Ghost Story"	Jihane Noskateb
"The Executioner's Apprentice"	Kay Kenyon
"Swimming Upstream in the Wells of the Desert"	Mike Resnick and Susan R. Matthews
"Unwirer"	Cory Doctorow and Charles Stross
"When the Morning Stars Sang Together"	Isaac Szpindel
"Herd Mentality"	Jay Caselberg
