= Tiassa =

2011 novel in the Vlad Taltos series by Steven Brust

- First edition
- Author: Steven Brust
- Cover artist: Stephen Hickman
- Language: English
- Series: The Vlad Taltos novels
- Genre: Fantasy novel
- Publisher: Tor Books
- Publication date: March 29, 2011
- Publication place: United States
- Media type: Print (Hardcover)
- Pages: 335 (1st ed., hardback)
- ISBN: 978-0-7653-1209-9 (1st ed., hardback)
- Dewey Decimal: 813/.54
- Preceded by: Iorich
- Followed by: Hawk

Tiassa is the thirteenth book in Steven Brust's Vlad Taltos series, set in the fantasy world of Dragaera. It was published in 2011. Following the trend of the series, it is named after one of the Great Houses and features that House as an important element to its plot.

== Plot summary ==
The book is presented in three parts, with a prelude, interludes, and an epilogue. All three larger sections and some of the smaller ones involve a silver statue of a tiassa, and the character of Khaavren, of the House of the Tiassa, but each tells a distinct story.

The first section, "Tag", tells the story, in the typical Vlad Taltos as first person narrator style, of certain events early in his career as a high-ranking Jhereg. Vlad is contacted by the Viscount of Adrilhanka, who is a rogue and highwayman, to defeat a scheme by the Empire to track stolen money.

The second section, "Whitecrest", is set much later, after Vlad is on the run from the Jhereg, and follows multiple characters, mainly the Countess of Whitecrest (Khaavren's wife and the Viscount's mother) and Cawti, Vlad's ex-wife. An impending Jenoine invasion is detected, but it may be a ruse to draw Vlad out.

The third section, "Special Tasks" is the most recent chronologically, and is written in the voice of Paarfi, the fictional author of the Khaavren Romances. It mainly follows Khaavren himself as he investigates an attempt on Vlad's life.
