= Iorich =

2010 novel in the Vlad Taltos series by Steven Brust

- First edition
- Author: Steven Brust
- Cover artist: Stephen Hickman
- Language: English
- Series: The Vlad Taltos novels
- Genre: Fantasy
- Publisher: Tor Books
- Publication date: January 5, 2010
- Publication place: United States
- Media type: Print (Hardcover)
- Pages: 319 (1st ed., hardback)
- ISBN: 978-0-7653-1208-2 (1st ed., hardback)
- OCLC: 428026886
- Dewey Decimal: 813/.54 22
- LC Class: PS3552.R84 I57 2010
- Preceded by: Jhegaala
- Followed by: Tiassa

Iorich is a fantasy novel by American writer Steven Brust, the twelfth book in his Vlad Taltos series, set in the fantasy world of Dragaera. It was published in 2010. Following the trend of the series, it is named after one of the Great Houses and usually features that House as an important element to its plot. The Iorich are renowned for their quest for justice and the rules of law. Initially released in hardcover, rather than being followed by a normal mass-market paperback, a trade paperback was released.

== Plot introduction ==
Vlad must uncover the true motives behind the mysterious arrest of one of his friends, and in the process try to find justice—whatever that is.

== Plot summary ==
Aliera has been arrested for practicing Elder Sorcery. The Empire was previously aware of her involvement with this ancient magic, so, naturally, confusion arises over the timing of, and true motivation for, her arrest. Aliera seems unwilling to defend herself, and neither Morrolan or Sethra step in to help her situation. Vlad's curiosity (and respect for his friend) lead him to initiate an investigation into the matter and engagement of an advocate to defend Aliera (despite her objections).

Along the way Vlad finds out that the entire affair is all to do with a plot between the Orca, Jhereg and Left hand of the Jhereg.
