= Odyssey Writing Workshop =

American writing workshop in New Hampshire

Founded in 1996 by World Fantasy Award winning editor Jeanne Cavelos, the Odyssey Writing Workshop is held annually on the campus of Saint Anselm College in Goffstown, New Hampshire.

== Notable graduates ==
- C. J. Lyons, Class of 2021
- Scott Gray, Class of 2020
- Peter Zuckerman, Class of 2019
- R. F. Kuang, Class of 2016
- Meagan Spooner, Class of 2009
- Juliette Crane, Class of 2008
- Sara King, Class of 2008
- Erin Hoffman, Class of 2005
- Carl Frederick, Class of 2000
- Theodora Goss, Class of 2000
- David J. Schwartz, Class of 1996
- Carrie Vaughn, Class of 1998
- Lynda E. Rucker, Class of 1997

== See also ==
- John Joseph Adams
- Terry Bisson
- Ben Bova
- David Brin
- Terry Brooks
- P. Djèlí Clark
- Ellen Datlow
- Charles de Lint
- Harlan Ellison
- Elizabeth Hand
- Nina Kiriki Hoffman
- George R. R. Martin
- Patricia A. McKillip
- Brandon Sanderson
- Robert J. Sawyer
- Melissa Scott
- Nisi Shawl
- Dan Simmons
- Eric James Stone
- Sheree Thomas
- Carrie Vaughn
- Sheila Williams
- Jane Yolen
