= Jhegaala =

2008 novel in the Vlad Taltos series by Steven Brust

- First edition
- Author: Steven Brust
- Cover artist: Stephen Hickman
- Language: English
- Series: The Vlad Taltos novels
- Genre: Fantasy
- Publisher: Tor Books
- Publication date: July 8, 2008
- Publication place: United States
- Media type: Print (Hardcover)
- Pages: 304 (1st ed., hardback)
- ISBN: 0-7653-0147-4 (1st ed., hardback)
- OCLC: 184823001
- Dewey Decimal: 813/.54 22
- LC Class: PS3552.R84 J48 2008
- Preceded by: Dzur
- Followed by: Iorich

Jhegaala is a fantasy novel by American writer Steven Brust, the eleventh book in his Vlad Taltos series, set in the fantasy world of Dragaera. It was published in 2008. Following the trend of the series, it is named after one of the Great Houses and usually features that House as an important element to its plot.

Each house uses a creature from the Dragaeran world as their symbol; the jhegaala itself is a creature that metamorphosizes many times throughout its lifespan. The mental aspect of this trait is observed in members of House Jhegaala suddenly changing walks of life at intervals. At the beginning of each chapter in the book, there is a short excerpt from a Dragaeran textbook describing the life cycle of a jhegaala or an excerpt from a Dragaeran play. One phase is described as being similar to the jhereg, explaining where its name came from, as that form is the most visible.

== Plot summary ==
Vlad Taltos visits Noish-pa and expresses interest in finding out about his mother. Noish-pa tells him his mother's family name was Merss and directs him to a town called Burz. After arriving in Burz, Vlad discovers that most of the Merss family fled west. The remaining members live outside of town.

Vlad discovers the family have been murdered and their house burned down with fire that could only have been produced by a witch. Vlad decides he will seek revenge for the murder of his kin. His investigation leads him to a man named Dahni who claims to work for the Count, who is interested in helping Vlad against their common enemy. A message arrives from the Count that Vlad should come to his estate. At the Count’s, Vlad is drugged and tortured for several days about his connection to the king of Fenario and his plans to steal the secret recipe to make paper, and then turned over to the Guild for several more days of torture before informing Loiosh to notify Dahni to come and rescue him. The Count regrets Vlad’s treatment and provides him sanctuary and medical treatment.

It is revealed that Dahni had been working for a Jhereg assassin who is after Vlad, and after questioning reveals the location of the assassin, who is hunted down and killed. Vlad moves back into the Cellar Mouse where, despite his injuries, he uses Loiosh and Rocza to gather information while he questions those who come to see him: Father Noij, some very distant kin, and Meehayi, his caretaker.

Vlad figures out who was behind the attack on his kin and sets in motion a plan to destroy the Guild and Coven by pretending he was killed by witches, causing a mob to hunt down the Coven, while simultaneously having the Count arrest the Guild. The Coven kills Chayoor in the belief that he has been trying to set them up. The feeble Vlad escapes with the help of Father Noij to Fenario. After several years, the now mostly recovered Vlad completes his revenge by returning to Burz, stealing the Count′s paper recipe, and sending it to Her Imperial Majesty Zerika the Fourth.

== Influences ==
At one point, Vlad tells Loiosh he's considering sitting around and thinking while Loiosh does all the legwork; Loioish responds that Vlad would end up weighing 300 pounds, the author's reference to the relationship between Rex Stout's corpulent Nero Wolfe and wisecracking assistant Archie Goodwin. As Brust explained, "I really wanted to do Vlad as Nero Wolfe with Loiosh as Archie Goodwin, so I did."

== Reception ==
Publishers Weekly considered Jhegaala "appealing" and a "classic private-eye thriller", lauding Brust's exposition and use of noir, but observed that "(l)ongtime fans may miss familiar surroundings and characters". The SF Site described it as "wonderfully engaging", but "probably not the best starting entry point into the series given how different it is in style from the others". Black Gate called it "every bit as compelling as earlier (novels in the series)", while noting that readers who "expect their heroes to dominate the bad guys and win through direct confrontation might be a bit confused". At Tor.com, Jo Walton said it was "a real downer" with "(t)oo much torture, too much angst, too much helplessness, and a very complicated plot that relies on everyone being idiotic", and stating that she "hated (the novel) the first time (she) read it" — while conceding that she was "reasonably confident" that she would like it on repeated readings.
