= In the Company of Others =

2001 novel by Julie Czerneda

- Author: Julie Czerneda
- Language: English
- Genre: Science fiction
- Publisher: G. P. Putnam's Sons
- Publication date: 2001
- Publication place: United States
- Media type: Print

In the Company of Others is a standalone novel written by the Canadian author Julie Czerneda. It was first published by DAW Books in June 2001 and distributed by Penguin Putnam. In 2002 it won the Aurora Award for Best Novel in English. The cover art of the first edition was created by Luis Royo and features the main character, Aaron Pardell, sliding along the cables outside of Thromberg station.

== Setting ==
The story is set in a future where Earth has become crowded and Humanity is prompted to expand beyond Sol system. Teams of terraformers have been sent to prepare new planets, making them suitable for sustaining humans. Space stations have been built to accommodate the flood of emigration to the new worlds. Humanity was eager to set out to their new homes and potentially make first contact with sentient alien beings until the deadly Quill effect made habitation on the terraformed worlds impossible. The Quill spread rapidly from planet to planet, mysteriously killing all in their path. Immigrants to the new worlds become stranded on the stations, unable to continue to their intended homes and not permitted to return from where they came when Earth sanctioned quarantine against all those outside of Sol system in an effort to keep the poorly understood Quill from striking at humanity's core.

Thromberg Station, one of a network of stations built to accommodate the traffic to the terraformed worlds, is where much of the story takes place. When the emigration is foiled, the station becomes grossly overpopulated with immigrants unable to go elsewhere. People must learn to survive when food, air, water, privacy and even reproduction necessitate strict control and compromise.

== Awards ==
| Year | Award | Category | Result | Ref |
|---|---|---|---|---|
| 2001 | Romantic Times Reviewers' Choice Award | Science Fiction Novel | Won | |
| 2002 | Aurora Award | Novel | Won | |
| 2002 | Philip K. Dick Award | — | Shortlisted | |
