= Carl Frederick =

American novelist

Carlton Frederick
- Born: New York City, U.S.
- Known for: Science Fiction Writing; Crypto-Stochastic Space-time theory OMNIVAC 1
- Awards: AnLab Award for Best Short Story; First place winner in the Writers of the Future contest 2000 graduate of the Odyssey Writers Workshop
- Scientific career
- Fields: Physics
- Website: www.darkzoo.net

Carlton Frederick, better known as Carl Frederick, is an American science fiction author and physicist. His nonfiction book est: Playing the Game the New Way describing the Erhard Seminars Training (est) theatrical experience. reached number 2 on the New York Times bestseller list.

Carl Frederick trained as a theoretical physicist, and after a post-doc at NASA and a stint at Cornell University, he left theoretical astrophysics and quantum relativity theory in favor of hi-tech industry. He is Chief Scientist of a small company developing artificial intelligence software. He lives in rural, Ithaca, New York. He is predominately a short story writer.

He has written short stories that have appeared in Analog Science Fiction and Fact, Andromeda Spaceways Inflight Magazine, Asimov's Science Fiction, Flash Fiction Online, Jim Baen's Universe, Space and Time, and other publications. Frederick has been nominated for the Anlab, Analog's Reader's Choice Award, award six times. He is a graduate of Odyssey Writing Workshop and a first-place winner of Writers of the Future.
