= Brokedown Palace (novel) =

1986 novel by Steven Brust

- First edition cover
- Author: Steven Brust
- Cover artist: Alan Lee
- Language: English
- Genre: Fantasy
- Publisher: Ace Books
- Publication date: 1986
- Publication place: United States
- Media type: Print (Paperback)
- Pages: xiii + 270
- ISBN: 0-441-07181-3
- OCLC: 13067356
- Dewey Decimal: 813/.54 22
- LC Class: PS3552.R84 B76 2006

Brokedown Palace is a fantasy novel by American writer Steven Brust, the only stand-alone novel set in Dragaera. It was originally published as a paperback original by Ace Books in 1986 and reprinted several times over the next decade. A British edition appeared in 1991. Orb, an imprint of Tor Books, brought the novel back into print in trade paperback in 2006. It is also notable for being set in Fenario, the human-populated portion of that world. Brokedown Palace opens in a medieval setting where a young man lies with grave wounds beside a river. He is the victim of his brother, the king, who has a very evil temper. There are four brothers in total, and this book is mainly about their relationships and battles. The pace is kept off-kilter by brief chapters interjecting folklore or sidestepping to other seemingly unrelated stories. The story incorporates Hungarian folklore and is filled with metaphors; the castle, for instance, represents a body, as well as being a metaphor for the disintegration of the family and the kingdom.

Brust has said that the story is inspired by the song "Brokedown Palace" by the band the Grateful Dead. This is acknowledged in the Orb edition, with the first names of the band members being listed on the dedication page, and the acknowledgments page including mention of the person who "started the whole thing by playing the song so beautifully; I fell in love with it even before I'd ever heard the boys do it".

== Major characters ==
- Miklós, Prince of Fenario
- Laszlo, King of Fenario
- Andor, Prince of Fenario
- Vilmos, Prince of Fenario
- Sandor, a Wizard
- Brigitta, a girl of common yet uncommon birth
- Mariska, Countess of Mordfal
- Viktor, Captain of the King's Guards

== Plot summary ==
The land of Fenario, on the borders of Faerie (read:Dragaera) is ruled by King Laszlo, oldest of four brothers. Prince Andor, second son, is an indulgent man, unable to discover his place. Prince Vilmos, third son, is a giant, such as are occasionally born into the line of Fenarr. The youngest, Prince Miklos, is at the center of the story. The family makes their home in a four-hundred-year-old palace, which is crumbling away under their feet.

The story concerns the destruction of their crumbling home, which serves as fulcrum around which many themes revolve. Desperation at things' ending, joy at new beginnings, and the way in which we choose to separate the two, are central themes of the novel.

== Devera ==
The character of Devera is a nine-year-old girl with brown hair, who frequently inhabits Steven Brust's novels. In Brokedown Palace, she appears twice to Prince Miklos, both times to guide him in what must be done.

== Reception ==
Orson Scott Card reviewed the novel favorably, praising "the flow of Brust's language" and concluding that Brokedown Palace is "Traditional, but never, not for a moment, ordinary."
