= Taltos (Brust novel) =

1988 novel in the Vlad Taltos series by Steven Brust

- First edition cover
- Author: Steven Brust
- Cover artist: Kinuko Y. Craft
- Language: English
- Series: The Vlad Taltos novels
- Genre: Fantasy
- Publisher: Ace Books
- Publication date: 1988
- Publication place: United States
- Media type: Print (Paperback)
- Pages: 181 (first edition, paperback)
- ISBN: 0-441-18200-3 (first edition, paperback)
- OCLC: 17680629
- Preceded by: Teckla
- Followed by: Phoenix

Taltos is a fantasy novel by American writer Steven Brust, the fourth book in his Vlad Taltos series, set in the fantasy world of Dragaera. Originally published in 1988 by Ace Books, it was reprinted in 2002 along with Phoenix as part of the omnibus The Book of Taltos. It does not follow the trend of being named after one of the Great Houses of the Dragaeran Empire, and instead takes its title from its protagonist. Due to the series being written out of chronological order, the events of this book are actually the earliest in the series' timeline.

== Plot summary ==
The story follows three separate timelines that ultimately come together by the end of the book. The first timeline begins each chapter and features Vlad performing an extremely complicated ritual of witchcraft. Vlad actually begins this ritual towards the end of the third timeline.

=== Early life ===
The second timeline charts the details of Vlad's development through childhood. Much of it overlaps with parts of Jhereg and Yendi, but goes into more detail. Vlad was born in Adrilankha, the capital city of the Dragaeran Empire. As an Easterner, Vlad is held in scorn by the larger, stronger, longer-lived, and generally more powerful Dragaerans. His father, a restaurateur, also believes that Dragaeran culture is superior to Eastern culture. He attempts to teach Vlad to feel the same and purchases a costly title from the House of the Jhereg, making the family technically citizens of the Empire. Vlad is regularly abused by gangs of young Orca, and learns to hate Dragaerans for the scorn they show him.

Vlad spends more time with his grandfather, an actual native of the Eastern Kingdoms, who teaches him about Eastern culture. Vlad learns to prefer Eastern fencing to Dragaeran swordsmanship, and Eastern witchcraft to Dragaeran sorcery. As Vlad grows older, he begins defending himself from Dragaerans and learns to enjoy hurting them. After his father dies, Vlad continues to sharpen his skills and gains the friendship of Kiera, a Jhereg thief. Kiera introduces Vlad to a Jhereg business associate, Nielar. Vlad then joins the Organization as a simple enforcer. He is partnered with Kragar, a mild and undistinguished former Dragonlord, and quickly establishes himself as a capable enforcer. At the age of 17, Vlad finishes his first assassination job. Thereafter, Vlad begins to live the high life through a steady stream of jobs.

Vlad eventually receives his first job requiring the use of a Morganti blade, to be used on a Jhereg informant to the Empire. Vlad contemplates his job for a while before deciding to pay off the target's mistress. Despite his aversion to the Morganti weapon, Vlad performs the job and achieves more renown. After a turf war, Vlad's boss is killed and he receives a new boss, whom he quickly starts to hate. Vlad kills his new boss and takes over his operation. Vlad's new operation runs smoothly for a short time until one of his enforcers, Quion, steals some of his money and flees to Dzur mountain, the home of an infamous and near-legendary sorceress called Sethra Lavode. Vlad must recover the money and kill Quion or he will lose face. This is the beginning of the third timeline.

=== Unlikely clients ===
Vlad decides to speak with Sethra's nominal lord, Morrolan, who agrees to bring Vlad to Dzur Mountain. There, Vlad meets Sethra Lavode, standing over the corpse of Quion. Vlad learns that Quion's theft was manipulated to orchestrate a meeting between Vlad, Sethra, and Morrolan. Angered by the manipulation, Vlad comes close to fighting both Sethra and Morrolan, but Sethra shockingly apologizes for her tactics and tempers cool. She further explains that she wants Vlad to steal a specific staff from the lair of a powerful Athyra wizard, Loraan, because only an Easterner can slip through Loraan's wards. He takes the job.

Vlad slips into the wizard's lair without much difficulty, only to discover that Loraan is working late. Morrolan appears and enters magical combat with Loraan and his guards. During the struggle, Vlad finds the staff and uses another of Loraan's artifacts, a magical length of gold chain, to destroy its protective enchantments. Loraan launches a blast at Vlad, but the chain absorbs the spell. As Loraan turns his attention back to Morrolan, Vlad stabs him from behind. Morrolan and Vlad flee and return to Dzur Mountain. There, Sethra and Morrolan inform Vlad that the staff they stole contains the soul of Aliera, Morrolan's cousin, who was trapped in the staff's jewel during Adron's Disaster. They ask Vlad to journey into the Paths of the Dead and rescue her soul from the Lords of Judgment. Vlad agrees on the vindictive condition that Morrolan accompany him, knowing Morrolan is even less likely to escape than himself.

=== Paths of the Dead ===
Morrolan and Vlad journey to Deathsgate Falls, where Dragaeran corpses are sent for burial. After rappelling down, they enter the Paths of the Dead, a labyrinth that all Dragaeran souls must navigate as a test before going into the Hall of Judgment. Morrolan and Vlad are challenged to a series of duels by twelve dead Dragonlords, but after Vlad tosses a dagger at one of them, they attack en masse. Vlad and Morrolan manage to kill them all, and continue through a number of other tests. They eventually reach the Lords of Judgment, who judge the fates of all Dragaeran souls that enter the Hall. Arguing that Aliera is the Dragon Heir, Morrolan successfully frees Aliera. Vlad and Aliera are cleared to leave the Halls, but not Morrolan. Aliera refuses to leave without Morrolan and goes to talk with the soul of Kieron the Conqueror, the founder of the Empire and her distant relative. She receives his greatsword after a hostile exchange, but the group is no closer to escaping.

Vlad formulates a plan and begins to perform the complex ritual of the first timeline. If the ritual fails, Vlad could go insane, or become too tired to leave the Halls himself. Through the ritual, he summons a vial of fluid given to him by Kiera in his youth, which Morrolan injects into his own veins. The fluid is the blood of a god, which allows Morrolan to resist the effects of the Halls. The three escape and return to Dzur Mountain. Sethra, Morrolan, and Aliera all express their gratitude to Vlad.

== Major themes ==
In the novel, the theme of a discriminating social order is prominent, and critic Stefan Ekman addresses how that theme comes out in the portrayal of the Paths of the Dead.

== Trivia and allusions ==
- Several lines of dialogue parody The Wizard of Oz, such as "And his little jhereg too."
- The alias Vlad uses after his first assassination is mispronounced as "Lord Mawdyear". This is the anglicized pronunciation of the Hungarian word "Magyár", meaning "Hungarian". Many words from Fenario, Vlad's ancestral homeland, are actually Hungarian.
