= Hawk (novel) =

2014 novel in the Vlad Taltos series by Steven Brust

- First edition
- Author: Steven Brust
- Cover artist: Stephen Hickman
- Language: English
- Series: The Vlad Taltos novels
- Genre: Fantasy novel
- Publisher: Tor Books
- Publication date: October 7, 2014
- Publication place: United States
- Media type: Print (Hardcover)
- Pages: 320 (1st ed., hardback)
- ISBN: 978-0-7653-2444-3 (1st ed., hardback)
- Dewey Decimal: 813/.54
- Preceded by: Tiassa
- Followed by: Vallista

Hawk is the fourteenth book in Steven Brust's Vlad Taltos series, set in the fantasy world of Dragaera. It was published in 2014. Following the trend of the series, it is named after one of the Great Houses, and the personality characteristics associated with that House are integral to its plot.

== Plot summary ==
An assassination attempt against Vlad Taltos, which takes place in his hometown of Adrilankha during a visit to his young son and estranged wife, nearly succeeds. In response to the attempt, Taltos decides that he will no longer run from the Jhereg criminal organization that placed a price on his head, and sets in motion "all sorts of intricate plots and schemes that guess, second-guess and third-guess his adversaries (often incorrectly)".

Noting the protagonist's characteristically unreliable first-person narration, another reviewer notes, "This being Vlad (and Brust), the plan is typically complex and convoluted and really doesn't matter all that much, partly because Vlad doesn't really fill the reader in on everything that’s happening. But if it helps, it involves a Hawk egg, a wand, and a euphonium."

In a review of the book, science fiction writer Cory Doctorow points to "two seemingly irreconcilable facts: a son that Vlad wants to be around, and a city where he is a dead man walking. There's only one way to resolve it, and that's to find a way to buy off, intimidate, or otherwise manipulate the Jhereg into forgiving him for committing the cardinal sin of betraying them to the authorities (without dying first)."

To execute his complex scheme, Taltos calls upon numerous old friends, including Daymar, an academic expert in sorcery from the House of the Hawk.

== Critical response ==
Doctorow's review in Boing Boing cites the story as "one of those jeweled Brustian timepieces of a caper" with "great feel and rhythm," likening the story to The Sting for its build to a satisfying climax.
