= Est: Playing the Game =

1976 book by Carl Frederick

est: Playing the Game the New Way
- Book cover
- Author: Carl Frederick
- Language: English
- Subject: Erhard Seminars Training
- Genre: Non-fiction
- Publisher: Delacorte Press
- Publication date: 1976
- Publication place: United States
- Pages: 228
- ISBN: 9780615547008

est: Playing the Game the New Way is a non-fiction book by Carl Frederick, first published in 1976, by Delacorte Press, New York. The book describes in words the basic message of Werner Erhard's Erhard Seminars Training (est) theatrical experience. Erhard/est sued in federal court in the United States to stop the book from publication, but the suit failed. The book takes a 'trainer's' approach to the est experience, in that it essentially duplicates the est training, citing examples and using jargon from the actual experience.

The title became a New York Times #2 best-seller, with more than a million copies in print, but overall critical reception was negative. The New York Times Book Review called it "a semi-literate rehash of Erhard-speak", and Library Journal noted, "The est disdain for critical thought and its fondness for its own jargon are painfully obvious in this book".

== Author ==
Frederick graduated from Penn State University with a Bachelor of Science degree in Psychology. He also received an MBA degree from the University of Chicago, and gained professional experience in advertising and marketing. He worked for Procter & Gamble in Cincinnati, Ohio, as a product manager in the company's Advertising Department. Subsequently, he went to Heublein in Hartford, Connecticut, where he held the position of Director of New Products. Finally, Frederick became VP/Director of Marketing for Hot Wheels at MattelToys in Los Angeles.

A graduate and devotee of est, Carl wrote the book while working to become a Seminar Leader for the est training. After the book became a best-seller, Frederick traveled to Hawaii, then traversed the globe in a sailboat. Along the way, he held management positions on various consulting projects in marketing and advertising, consulting, and also worked in journalism at a newspaper in New Zealand. In 1985, Carl started a U.S. business which distributed Harley Davidson accessories. The company carried out operations in the South Pacific, Hawaii, and California. Frederick eventually settled in Costa Rica. where he constructed and managed a tourist resort in 1997.

== Litigation ==
Werner Erhard/est sued Frederick, reportedly in an attempt to prevent publication of the book. In an article "30 Years After the 'EST' Experience", which appeared in the 2003 Collectors Edition of his book, Frederick discussed the litigation initiated against him by Werner Erhard. Frederick wrote that his 200-plus page manuscript for the book was initially titled The Game of Life and How To Win It. According to Frederick, he sent a copy of the book to about 12 publishers, and also sent a personal copy to Erhard. Frederick wrote that Erhard responded by suing him in U.S. Federal Court, claiming "I had infringed his copyrighted material - BUT, he didn't attach any material to his complaint. Moreover, I never saw anything printed in est, it was all live theater", and I was never asked to sign anything that said what I could (or couldn't) do as a result of taking the est training"

Frederick described his account of the litigation: "Erhard sent seven lawyers to the courtroom; I had one. They argued I was taking illegal liberty with the most incredible educational system in existence, and that I must be stopped immediately. The judge must have thought that we were arguing over some might trivial scribblings, because he just looked up quizzingly over his Franklin specs and threw the whole case right out the door." Erhard filed three lawsuits against Frederick, claiming copyright infringement. All of est/Erhard's suits were ruled 'nuisance claims'and summarily "thrown out of court" in 1976.

== Publication ==
After the lawsuits concluded, Frederick signed a book deal with Dell/Delacorte Press, New York, receiving "more money in advance than any unknown author in the history of the United States." Frederick's agent, Ron Bernstein of Candida Donadio & Associates, commented on the book's successful publication in the face of the multiple lawsuits by Erhard/est: "... we feel this book's publication is a major victory against est's attempts to control the media." Originally copyrighted in 1974 by Delacorte Press, the book was first published in 1976, and republished in 1981. A Collector's Edition was published in 2003 by Synergy International of the Americas, and the author issued a revised Edition in 2012, which is now being sold on Amazon's Kindle and a paperback is available from Amazon Create Space.

== Contents ==
The book essentially duplicates the est training in words. It is dedicated "To Werner .. the ultimate experience in beingness". Frederick takes the reader through the experience of the est training by providing vivid episodes which present the est perspective. He uses language to incite the reader in an attempt to reproduce this experience. Frederick utilizes stylistic techniques in the book such as text in all capital letters, instructing the reader, "THE TRUTH IS THAT THERE IS NO INHERENT SIGNIFICANCE TO ANYTHING YOU ARE, YOU DO, OR YOU HAVE."

Frederick incorporates jargon from the est training in the work. He alternates between referring to the reader as "an ass" or "baby". The book contains short segments on various themes titled: "Total Acceptance and Responsibility", "Winners and Losers", and "The Game of Life". Chapter headings include: "How to Get All the Cheese in Life" and "How to Get Where You Really Want to Go in Life". Frederick emphasizes the importance of self-awareness, writing: "You are the Supreme being, in Spirit". He attempts to convince the reader that life should be considered a game, and that it is more desirable to win at a goal than it is to be right about it. Frederick's thesis is that individuals cause all events which occur in their lives, and that they should work to consciously control their circumstances.

== Critical reception ==
The book became a best-seller. It hit number four on The New York Times' list of best selling trade paperbacks in May 1976, and later reached the number two spot on the list. The book sold 900,000 copies. In Psychology as Religion, author Paul C. Vitz describes the book as a "popularization". An article in New York Magazine characterizes Frederick's work as a "do-it-yourself book" on the est training. Writing in Sporting with the Gods, Michael Oriard comments that Frederick's book "celebrated" the est training. Carl Ferdinand Howard Henry notes in God, Revelation, and Authority that Frederick devotes text in the book to "expounding the view promoted by the self-assertion cult est".

"Frederick's book is a semi-literate rehash of Erhard-speak as it is practiced by Erhard, his 'trainers,' and his 'graduates.'"

— The New York Times Book Review

Writing in a review of the book for Library Journal, M. E. Monbeck comments: "The est disdain for critical thought and its fondness for its own jargon are painfully obvious in this book, est is certainly a most innovative approach, one which seems to have helped many adults and harmed few. There is, however, very little appreciation in est of the unique psychology of children, and est's effects on them seem to be potentially very harmful." Booklist criticizes the author, due to the ambiguous stylistic nature of the book. The review notes, "Whereas the dust jacket identifies him as an est graduate who is interpreting that experience for others, this book itself says nothing of the relationship." Booklist complained that it was, "difficult to separate interpretation from the original version" of Frederick's recounting of the est training.

In her review in The New York Times Book Review, Vivian Gornick notes: "[Of this book] the less said the better. ... In short: Frederick's book is a semi-literate rehash of Erhard-speak as it is practiced by Erhard, his 'trainers,' and his 'graduates.'" A review of the book in Kirkus Reviews was negative; the review writes critically of the author, "Now we have priests like Carl Frederick, EST graduate, ad man and 'simply another human being,' who addresses his reader as 'baby' when not calling him 'asshole.' The original EST marathon entails four days of this kind of insult." Kirkus Reviews concludes, characterizing the book as, "Low blows at high decibels."

== See also ==
- Getting It: The psychology of est
- Human Potential Movement
- Large Group Awareness Training
- New age
- Outrageous Betrayal
