= Julie Czerneda =

Canadian writer (born 1955)

Julie E. Czerneda
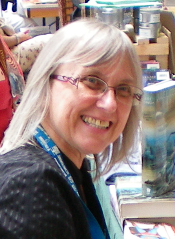
- Julie E. Czerneda (foreground) at the Polaris 26 science fiction convention
- Born: Julie Elizabeth Starink; April 11, 1955 (age 71); Exeter, Ontario, Canada
- Education: University of Waterloo (BSc, 1976; University of Saskatchewan (1976-78); Queen's University, Kingston (1978)
- Occupations: Novelist; short story author; editor
- Spouse: Roger Czerneda (m. 1976)
- Children: 2
- Writing career
- Period: 1997–
- Genres: Science fiction; Fantasy
- Notable work: In the Company of Others (2001)
- Website: www.czerneda.com

Julie Elizabeth Czerneda (née Starink; born 1955) is a Canadian science fiction and fantasy author. She has written many novels, including four Aurora Award for Best Novel winners (In the Company of Others, A Turn of Light, A Play of Shadow, and The Gossamer Mage), and a number of short stories; she has also edited several anthologies.

Czerneda is a biologist by education and has been active in writing and editing non-fiction. She has edited and authored a number of educational books about career guidance and the teaching of science. In 2022, Czerneda was inducted into the Canadian Science Fiction and Fantasy Association Hall of Fame (CSFFA).

== Biography ==
Julie Elizabeth Starink was born in Exeter, Ontario on April 11, 1955, to Everett Norman and Joy Margaret (née Lace) Starink. She received a Bachelor of Science in biology at the University of Waterloo, after which she conducted graduate researched on "fish and the evolution of reproductive communication systems" at the University of Saskatchewan and attended Queen's University at Kingston. While studying at the University of Waterloo, Starink met Roger Czerneda; the two married on July 24, 1976. They have two children.

After working at the University of Waterloo, Czerneda focused on her writing career.

As of 2022, Czerneda lived near Ottawa.

== Awards and honours ==
In 2007, Czerneda received the Alumni of Honour Award from the University of Waterloo.

Awards for Czerneda's work
Year	Work	Award	Result	Ref.
1998	A Thousand Words for Stranger	Locus Award for First Novel	Finalist	
2000	Beholder's Eye	Aurora Award for Best Novel	Finalist	
2001	Changing Vision	Aurora Award for Best Novel	Finalist	
2001	Changing Vision	Romantic Times Reviewers' Choice Award for Science Fiction Novel	Finalist	
2001	"Down on the Farm"	Aurora Award for Best Short Fiction	Finalist	
2002	In the Company of Others	Aurora Award for Best Novel	Winner	
2002	In the Company of Others	Philip K. Dick Award	Shortlist	
2002	"Left Foot on a Blind Man"	Aurora Award for Best Short Fiction	Winner	
2003	Explorer: Tales from the Wonder Zone	Aurora Award for Best Related Work	Finalist	
2003	"Prism"	Aurora Award for Best Short Fiction	Finalist	
2003	Stardust: Tales from the Wonder Zone	Aurora Award for Best Related Work	Finalist	
2003	Tales from the Wonder Zone	Golden Duck Award for Best Science and Technology Education	Winner	
2003	To Trade the Stars	Aurora Award for Best Novel	Finalist	
2004	Hidden in Sight	Aurora Award for Best Novel	Finalist	
2004	Space, Inc.	Aurora Award for Best Related Work	Winner	
2005	Odyssey: Tales From the Wonder Zone	Aurora Award for Best Related Work	Finalist	
2005	ReVisions	Aurora Award for Best Related Work	Finalist	
2005	Survival	Aurora Award for Best Novel	Finalist	
2006	Fantastic Companions	Aurora Award for Best Related Work	Finalist	
2006	Migration	Aurora Award for Best Novel	Finalist	
2006	"She's Such a Nasty Morsel"	Aurora Award for Best Short Fiction	Finalist	
2007	Mythspring	Aurora Award for Best Related Work	Finalist	
2007	Regeneration	Aurora Award for Best Novel	Finalist	
2008	Polaris: A Celebration of Polar Science	Aurora Award for Best Related Work	Finalist	
2008	Under Cover of Darkness	Aurora Award for Best Related Work	Winner	
2010	Ages of Wonder	Aurora Award for Best Related Work	Finalist	
2012	Tesseracts Fifteen	Aurora Award for Best Related Work	Finalist	
2014	A Turn of Light	Aurora Award for Best Novel	Winner	
2015	A Play of Shadow	Aurora Award for Best Novel	Winner	
2018	To Guard Against the Dark	Aurora Award for Best Novel	Finalist	
2019	"A Hold Full of Truffles"	Aurora Award for Best Short Fiction	Finalist	
2020	The Gossamer Mage	Aurora Award for Best Novel	Winner	
2022	"Decay in Five Stages"	Aurora Award for Best Novelette/Novella	Finalist	
2026	A Shift of Time	Aurora Award for Best Novel	Finalist	

== Publications ==
=== As author ===
==== Standalone books ====
- In the Company of Others (2001) – ISBN 9780756417826
- The Gossamer Mage (2019) – ISBN 9780756412340
- To Each This World (November 2022, DAW) – ISBN 9780756415426

==== Novellas ====
- No Place Like Home (2016)

==== The Clan Chronicles ====
This continuity was formerly called the Trade Pact Universe.

===== Trade Pact trilogy =====
1. A Thousand Words for Stranger (1997) – ISBN 9780886777692
2. Ties of Power (1999) – ISBN 9780886778507
3. To Trade the Stars (2002) – ISBN 9780756400750

===== Stratification trilogy =====
Prequel to the Trade Pact trilogy:

1. Reap the Wild Wind (2007) – ISBN 9780756404871
2. Riders of the Storm (2008) – ISBN 9780756405618
3. Rift in the Sky (2009) – ISBN 9780756406097

===== Reunification trilogy =====
1. This Gulf of Time and Stars (2015) – ISBN 9780756408695
2. The Gate to Futures Past (2016) – ISBN 9780756408701
3. To Guard Against the Dark (2017) – ISBN 9780756408787

==== Species Imperative ====
Trilogy of biology, politics and survival in a multi-species, interstellar future.

1. Survival (2004) – ISBN 9780756402617
2. Migration (2005) – ISBN 9780756403461
3. Regeneration (2006) – ISBN 9780756404116

==== Esen ====
With the publication of Search Image, the Web Shifters trilogy is listed as part of the Esen continuity, which features the adventures of the shape-shifter Esen-alit-Quar. A Carisian, a species which plays a significant role in the Clan Chronicles, also appears in Search Image, although there are no common plot points.

===== Web Shifters =====
1. Beholder's Eye (1998) – ISBN 9780756413514
2. Changing Vision (2000) – ISBN 9780756411954
3. Hidden in Sight (2003) – ISBN 9780756401399

===== Web Shifter's Library =====
1. Search Image (2018) – ISBN 9780756412449
2. Mirage (2020) – ISBN 9780756415617
3. Spectrum (2022) – ISBN 9780756415648

==== Night's Edge ====
1. A Turn of Light (2013) – ISBN 9780756407070
2. A Play of Shadow (2014) – ISBN 9780756408312
  In 2014 Czerneda announced that DAW Books had bought the next three books in the series.
3. A Change of Place (2024) - ISBN 9780756410698
4. A Shift of Time (2025) - ISBN 9780698193550 (Was originally announced as A Fall of Darkness.)
5. A Twist of Magic (announced)

==== Collection ====
- Imaginings: 25th Anniversary Collection (2022)

==== Contributor ====
- "Prism" (Web Shifters) in DAW 30th Anniversary Science Fiction Anthology, edited by Elizabeth R. Wollheim and Sheila E. Gilbert (2002) ISBN 9780756400644
- ReVisions, edited by Julie E. Czerneda and Isaac Szpindel (2004) – ISBN 9780756402402
- Sirius the Dog Star edited by Martin H. Greenberg and Alexander Potter (2004) – ISBN 9780756401863, "Brothers Bound" (prequel to the Stratification trilogy in the Clan Chronicles)
- "She's Such a Nasty Morsel" (Web Shifters) in Women of War edited by Alexander Potter and Tanya Huff (2005) – ISBN 9780756402860
- "A Touch of Blue" (Web Shifters) in Heroes in Training, edited by Martin H. Greenberg and Jim C. Hines (2007) – ISBN 9780756404383
- "The Passenger" in Lightspeed Science Fiction and Fantasy magazine, February 2011
- "The Franchise" in Space Stations edited by Martin H. Greenberg and John Helfers (sequel to In the Company of Others) – ISBN 9780756401764

==== Career guidance ====
- Great careers for people interested in living things (1993) – ISBN 9780810393875
- Great careers for people who like to work with their hands (1994) – ISBN 9780810399631
- Great careers for people interested in communications technology (1996) by Julie E. Czerneda and Victoria Vincent
- Great careers for people fascinated by government and the law (1996) by Anne Marie Males; contributing authors, Julie Czerneda and Victoria Vincent

=== As editor ===
- Space, Inc. (2003) – ISBN 9780756401474
- ReVisions with Isaac Szpindel (2004) – ISBN 9780756402402
- Tesseracts 15: A Case of Quite Curious Tales with Susan MacGregor (2004) – ISBN 9781894063586
- Fantastic Companions (2005) – ISBN 9781550418637
- Mythspring: From the Lyrics and Legends of Canada (2006) with Genevieve Kierans – ISBN 9780889953406
- Under Cover of Darkness with Jana Paniccia (2007) – ISBN 9780756404048
- Misspelled (2008) – ISBN 9780756404758
- Ages of Wonder with Rob St. Martin (2009) – ISBN 9780756405434
- Tesseracts Fifteen: A Case of Quite Curious Tales (2011) with Susan MacGregor – ISBN 9781894063586
- Nebula Awards Showcase 2017 (2017) – ISBN 9781633882713
- The Clan Chronicles: Tales from Plexis (2018), anthology – ISBN 9780756413934

==== Science education through science fiction stories in the classroom ====
- No Limits: Developing Scientific Literacy Using Science Fiction (1998), non-fiction – ISBN 9781895579949
- Packing Fraction & Other Tales of Science & Imagination (1998) – ISBN 9781895579895

==== Tales from the Wonder Zone ====
- Stardust (2001) ISBN 9781552440186
- Explorer (2002) ISBN 9781552440223
- Orbiter (2002) ISBN 9781552440209
- Odyssey (2004) ISBN 9781552440803
- Polaris: A Celebration of Polar Science (2007) ISBN 9780889953727. Winner of the Canadian Science Writers' Award (Youth Book, 2007)

==== Realms of Wonder ====
- Summoned to Destiny (2004) ISBN 9781550418613
- Fantastic Companions (2005) ISBN 9781550418637

== See also ==
- List of University of Waterloo people
