= Dzur (novel) =

2007 novel in the Vlad Taltos series by Steven Brust

- First edition
- Author: Steven Brust
- Cover artist: Stephen Hickman
- Language: English
- Series: The Vlad Taltos novels
- Genre: Fantasy
- Publisher: Tor Books
- Publication date: October 2007
- Publication place: United States
- Media type: Print (Paperback)
- Pages: 288 (first edition, paperback)
- ISBN: 0-7653-4154-9 (first edition, paperback)
- OCLC: 181587774
- Preceded by: Issola
- Followed by: Jhegaala

Dzur is a fantasy novel by American writer Steven Brust, the tenth book of the Vlad Taltos series, originally published in 2006 by Tor Books. It takes place immediately after Issola, the previous novel. The novel was originally intended to be called Tiassa, after another Dragaeran House. The book entered The New York Times Bestseller list for Hardcover Fiction on August 22, 2006.

== Plot summary ==
=== Prelude ===
Following the events of Issola, Vlad wants some respite and asks to be sent to his favorite restaurant in South Adrilankha, Valabar's. Shortly after he is seated, he is joined by Telnan, a Dzur and Sethra Lavode's apprentice to restart the Lavode order that was destroyed following the events detailed in The Viscount of Adrilankha. Notably, Telnan is also a holder of one of the Great Weapons, Nightslayer. As they prepare to start their multi-course meal, they are joined by the legendary Mario Greymist, who informs Vlad that Cawti, Vlad's estranged wife, had lost control of the underworld elements throughout South Adrilankha which threatens to start a House war between the Dragons and Jhereg.

=== Investigation ===
After his meal, Vlad returns to Dzur mountain and requests through multiple channels to speak to Cawti to get a better understanding of what happened in his absence. She confirms that she neglected the underworld organization Vlad left to her when he went on the run from the Jhereg, and that the Left Hand of the Jhereg, a coven of sorceresses who normally operate autonomously from the Right Hand (the crime organization run by the male Jhereg), have made an unprecedented move of taking over the crime holdings and try to force Cawti into retirement. Cawti's friend, Norathar, the Dragon heir to the Imperial Throne, doesn't want to see control taken away from Cawti, which is setting the stage for the possible House war. Vlad takes on the responsibility to get to the bottom of the Left Hand's involvement and prevent further chaos. He sets up base in South Adrilankha in disguise and through following runners finds the house where the Left Hand is operating. Despite his magic blocking stones, one of the sorceresses discovers him and attempts to kill him. However, Lady Teldra, Vlad's Great Weapon, deflects the attack spell back to the sorceress and kills her.

Vlad now knows he must be more careful to mask his actions, but he needs more information about what is going on and who is involved, but he lacks the resources he had when he was a crime boss. He then realizes that while he lacks an organization, he does not lack resources as he is tremendously rich. He contacts an old Eastern friend of his who knows people that Vlad could use as paid information gatherers, and puts in place an information network. As details start coming in, Vlad uses the pieces he is gathering at the Imperial Library to flesh out what is going on. In the course of this research, he comes to find out that the head of the Right Hand council had died and there is an ongoing power struggle to fill the empty position. One of the men vying for the position is the lover of the head of the Left Hand, and it's her intervention of trying to take over South Adrilankha that would give him enough leverage to become the head of the council. Vlad also finds out that the sorceress that he killed was the sister of the head sorceress, and that the death was Morganti, an unexpected power of Lady Teldra as normally Morganti deaths require the weapon to come into physical contact with the victim.

=== Conclusion ===
Vlad sets plans in motion to stop the Left Hand without getting himself killed. He calls upon Mario to assassinate the head sorceress, and while that is going on, Vlad successfully makes moves to interfere with the Left Hand's ability to take over the South Adrilankha operations, which would make them unable to give their choice for council head the ability to ascend. He also, at great risk to his life, contacts The Demon, one of the Right Hand council members, and makes a deal to help The Demon ascend to the head of the council in exchange for all Jhereg influence in South Adrilankha to cease until the end of Norathar's reign. Vlad then confronts the Left Hand at their base of operations to force them to take the same deal. However, they believe he doesn't have enough power to make them comply, and threaten to destroy him. But before they can attack, Telnan, having been influenced by a dream sent by Verra, the Demon Goddess, appears with Nightslayer out and displaying its power. Under the threat of not one, but two Great Weapons, the Left Hand reluctantly agrees to Vlad's demands, but swear to destroy him if ever the opportunity presents itself. With order restored, Vlad prepares to leave Adrilankha and go back into hiding, but not before Cawti finally reveals that they now have a son. He stays a little longer to finally meet his son.

== Cultural references ==
- All the chapters following the prelude are titled for each course of the meal Vlad shares with Telnan at Valabar's. Each chapter starts with Vlad's description of the named course and his conversations with Telnan learning about the nature of Dzurs and Great Weapons.
- This novel features the first in-person appearance of Mario Greymist in the Vlad Taltos series. Mario has been mentioned in most of the books of the Vlad series, usually tied to assassinations where no one can determine who made the hit. It is revealed that Vlad's long-time friend and former second-in-command Kragar has been Mario's main contact for the last 90 years.

== The House of Dzur ==
House Dzur is one of the 17 noble Houses of the Dragaeran Empire. Dzur tend to be aggressive, solitary fighters, and reluctant to fight with the odds on their side. They are considered somewhat simplistic by some other Houses in terms of how they react to things with violence. Dzur usually have dark hair and eyes, with pointed ears and slanted eyes. They wear only black as the color of their House.

The House is named after the dzur, a predator cat similar to the black panther. The Cycle Poem observes, "Dzur stalks and blends with night".
