= Steven Brust =

American fantasy and science fiction author (born 1955)

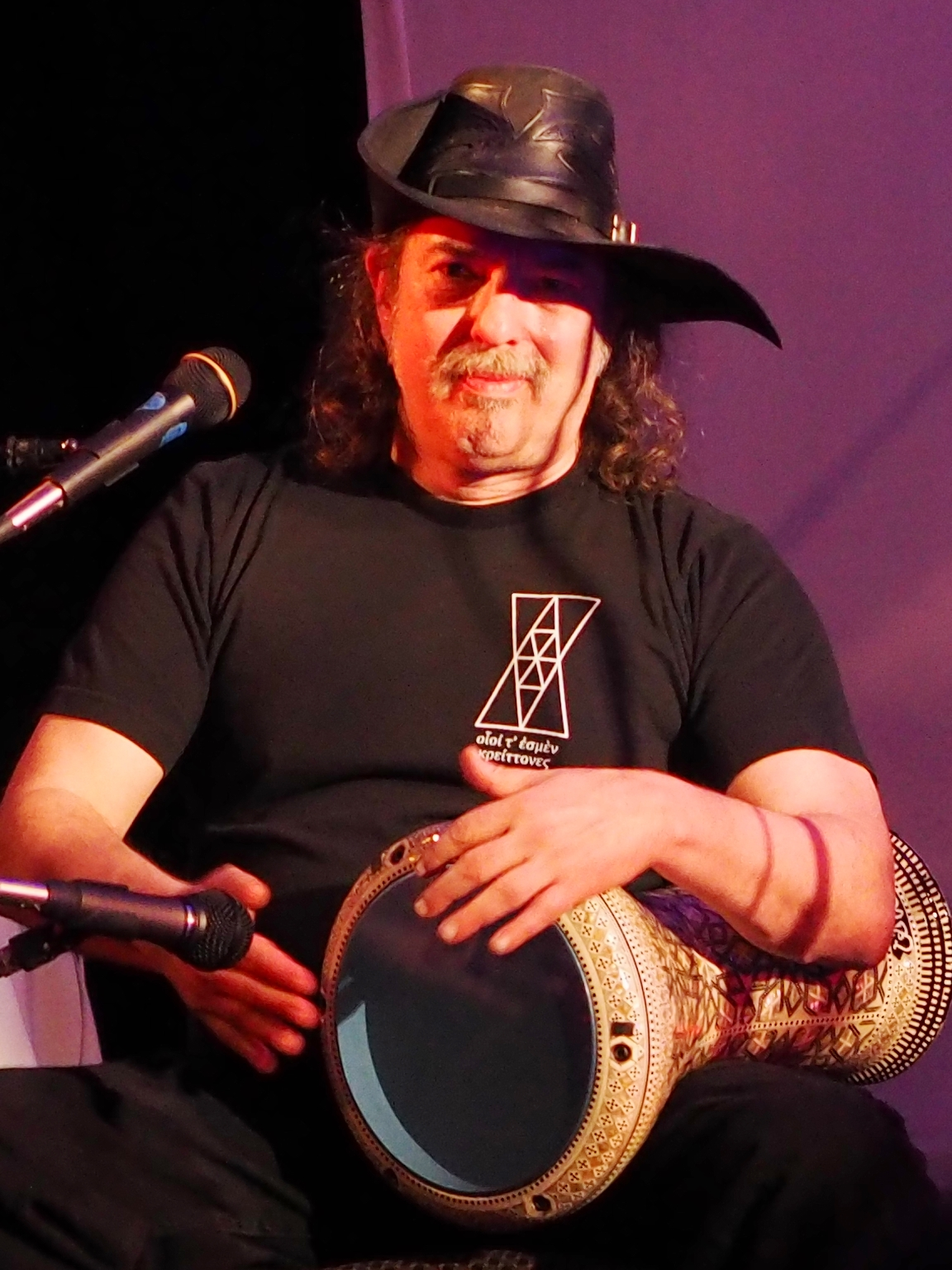
- Brust on drum at Cats Laughing reunion concert, April 2015
- Born: Steven Karl Zoltán Brust; November 23, 1955 (age 70); Saint Paul, Minnesota, U.S.
- Occupations: Writer; musician; poker player
- Writing career
- Genres: Fantasy, science fiction
- Notable work: Dragaera series
- Website: dreamcafe.com

Steven Karl Zoltán Brust (born November 23, 1955) is an American fantasy and science fiction author of Hungarian descent. He is best known for his series of novels about the assassin Vlad Taltos, one of a disdained minority group of humans living on a world called Dragaera. His recent novels also include The Incrementalists (2013) and its sequel The Skill of Our Hands (2017), with co-author Skyler White.

As a drummer and singer-songwriter, Brust has recorded one solo album and two albums as a member of Cats Laughing. Brust also co-wrote songs on two albums recorded in the mid-1990s by the band Boiled in Lead.

== Writing career ==
=== The Dragaeran books ===
The Vlad Taltos series, written as high fantasy with a science fiction underpinning, is set on a planet called Dragaera. The events of the series take place in an Empire mostly inhabited and ruled by the Dragaerans, a genetically engineered humanoid species, having characteristics such as greatly extended lifespans and heights averaging about seven feet. Referred to as "elfs" by some humans, they refer to themselves as "human". The Dragaeran Empire controls a region that is "enclouded" by a perpetual overcast that blocks the sun from view.

Vlad Taltos is one of the human minority (known by Dragaerans as "Easterners"), which exists as a lower class in the Empire. Vlad also practices the human art of witchcraft; "táltos" is Hungarian for a kind of supernatural person in folklore. Though human, he is a citizen of the Empire because his social-climbing father bought a title in one of the less reputable of the 17 Dragaeran Great Houses. The only Great House that sells memberships this way is, not coincidentally, also the one that maintains a criminal organization. Vlad proves surprisingly successful in this organization. Despite being a human and a criminal, he has a number of high-ranking Dragaeran friends and often gets caught up in important events.

Brust has written 17 published novels in the series. The first three novels resemble private-eye detective stories, perhaps the closest being Robert B. Parker's Spenser series. The later novels are more varied than the first three. Though they read like fantasy, there are science-fictional explanations for some things.

Brust has also written another series set in Dragaera, the Khaavren Romances, set centuries before Vlad's time. Since Dragaerans live for thousands of years, many characters appear in both series. It is partly an homage to Alexandre Dumas père's novels about The Three Musketeers, and is five volumes long, following the pattern of Dumas' series. The books are presented as historical novels written by Paarfi of Roundwood, a Dragaeran roughly contemporary with Vlad. Paarfi's old-fashioned, elaborate, and highly verbose writing is explicitly based on Dumas', though with a dialogue style that is, at times, based on Tom Stoppard's wordgames in Rosencrantz & Guildenstern Are Dead (according to Pamela Dean's introduction to Five Hundred Years After). The Baron of Magister Valley, an additional Paarfi novel, is modeled after Dumas's The Count of Monte Cristo.

The two series are finally brought together in the thirteenth novel in the Vlad series, Tiassa, which can also be viewed as the sixth novel in the Khaavren series. Tiassa comprises what are in effect three related novellas, each told in a different style and connected by a common theme. The first section reads like the first three novels in the series, with first-person narration by Vlad but including Khaavren's son, Piro; the second section has a different viewpoint character in each of its chapters; and the third section is narrated by Paarfi in the style of the earlier Khaavren Romances, with Khaavren as the viewpoint character and interacting with Vlad.

=== Short stories ===
Most of Brust's short stories are set in shared universes. These include Emma Bull's and Will Shetterly's Liavek, Robert Asprin's Thieves' World, Neil Gaiman's Sandman and Terri Windling's Borderland Series.

=== Style and literary theory ===
Brust was a founding member of a Minnesota-based writers' group called The Scribblies, which included Emma Bull, Pamela Dean, Will Shetterly, Nate Bucklin, Kara Dalkey, and Patricia Wrede. He also was a founding member of the Pre-Joycean Fellowship.

He has rejected a distinction between science fiction and fantasy, stating that no belief in such a distinction can withstand an encounter with the writing of Roger Zelazny.

==== Writing style ====
There is a certain amount of variation in the writing style amongst the Taltos novels, as well as between Brust's various series. Brust uses a different narrative approach in almost every novel in the Taltos series. Some of these approaches are more purely stylistic and have minor effects on the actual story-telling; some are profound and involve the point of view of characters whom the reader never expected to get to know so well.

Further, as the writing of the Taltos novels has spanned over four decades, they have been influenced by events in Brust's own life. A fascination with the Mafia – subsequently brought into a somewhat shocking perspective by the murder of a friend – profoundly influenced his storylines, as did the breakup of his marriage. The events and arguments of his books, especially Teckla, are acknowledged by Brust to be influenced by his lifelong interest in Marxist theory and practice. Brust's parents were activists in the Workers League, the predecessor to the Socialist Equality Party, and he continues to identify as a "Trotskyist sympathizer," linking to the SEP-affiliated World Socialist Web Site on his personal website. He endorsed the SEP's presidential candidates in the 2016 US elections.

==== Literary theory ====
In contrast to contemporary academic studies in literature, Brust has put forward what he called "The Cool Stuff Theory of Literature":

All literature consists of whatever the writer thinks is cool. The reader will like the book to the degree that he agrees with the writer about what's cool. And that works all the way from the external trappings to the level of metaphor, subtext, and the way one uses words. In other words, I happen not to think that full-plate armor and great big honking greatswords are cool. I don't like 'em. I like cloaks and rapiers. So I write stories with a lot of cloaks and rapiers in 'em, 'cause that's cool. Guys who like military hardware, who think advanced military hardware is cool, are not gonna jump all over my books, because they have other ideas about what's cool.

Brust elaborated, "The novel should be understood as a structure built to accommodate the greatest possible amount of cool stuff."

==== Motifs ====
The character Devera, usually a cute brown-eyed girl of about nine, appears as a motif in all of Brust's novels. In the Dragaeran books, her name is Devera. She is the (future) daughter of another character and seems to be able to appear anywhere in time and space. In Brust's non-Dragaeran books her appearances are usually brief and not always obvious.

== Musical recordings and performances ==
Brust is a singer-songwriter and drummer who has recorded a solo album, and who has played in the Minneapolis-based folk rock band Cats Laughing, and with the Albany Free Traders, and Morrigan.

Brust also co-wrote two songs on the 1994 album Antler Dance by the band Boiled in Lead (BiL), as well as many of the songs on BiL's 1995 multimedia CD Songs from The Gypsy.

=== Cats Laughing ===
Cats Laughing released two albums with Brust as the drummer, in 1988 and 1990. Brust also contributed as a songwriter and vocalist. The 1990 album Another Way to Travel features cover art that depicts the band members and a vehicle known as the Catmobile, the band vehicle for Cats Laughing. The car, owned by Brust, was a Cadillac ambulance, painted yellow, light blue, and dark blue, with murals.

On April 3, 2015, Brust performed as part of Cats Laughing in a reunion concert at the Minicon 50 science fiction convention in Bloomington, Minnesota. In March 2016, Cats Laughing released a double CD of their 2015 reunion, A Long Time Gone, as well as a DVD by the same title with documentary concert footage.

=== Solo ===
A Rose for Iconoclastes, a folk (or folk pop) album released in 1993, is Brust's only solo album. The title is a reference to "A Rose for Ecclesiastes", a short story by Brust's literary hero and mentor Roger Zelazny.

Twelve of the fourteen songs were written or co-written by Brust. The album was produced by Adam Stemple, a fellow fantasy writer and member of Cats Laughing.

=== Songs from The Gypsy (1995) ===
Boiled in Lead: Songs from The Gypsy
Review scores
| Source | Rating |
|---|---|
| AllMusic | 2/5 stars |

The 1995 enhanced CD Songs from The Gypsy, by the band Boiled in Lead, featured songs written by Brust and Adam Stemple, as well as the full text of Brust's novel The Gypsy.

AllMusic reviewer Steven McDonald called Songs from The Gypsy "an example of Brust's serious songwriting working well."

Conversely, a critical review by AllMusic's Roch Parisien emphasized that "Songs from The Gypsy represents a failure of multimedia integration. As an audio CD, the disc serves up ten songs, ranging from acoustic trad to bluesy rockers, that ironically form a less cohesive whole than previous Boiled in Lead releases. The better numbers (like the title track) incorporate Celtic rock with Hungarian, Middle Eastern, and other interesting worldbeat influences." Parisien found the album's integration with the novel unsuccessful, in that the novel's 17 chapters were presented as "scrollable text only, which also intersperse some 80 song lyric excerpts that you can play from hot buttons. Annoyingly, you must flip back to the main menu index to move from one chapter to the next." Parisien concluded, "Despite Brust's engrossingly poetic, impressionist story inspired by Hungarian folk tales and revolving around three Gypsy brothers, the project does not overcome the primary limitation of bringing literature to the computer screen, that being that the computer offers an inhospitable environment for viewing literature-length text." The review, written in 1995, predated a wave of popular e-book readers that began to emerge about ten years later.

=== Other performances ===
Brust has performed dramatically in several Shockwave Radio Theater productions, notably Closing Ceremonies (aka The Fall of the House of Usherette) and PBS Liavek.

== Award nominations ==
Brust's short story "When The Bow Breaks" was nominated for the 1998 Nebula Award.

Five Hundred Years After was nominated for the 1995 Locus Poll Award (Best Fantasy Novel). Other novels nominated for various Locus Poll Awards were Brokedown Palace, The Gypsy, Agyar, and Freedom & Necessity.

Dragon was a finalist for the 1999 Minnesota Book Awards in the Fantasy & Science Fiction category. Freedom and Necessity was a 1998 finalist for the same category, while The Phoenix Guards was a finalist in 1992.

Brust discovered in August 2006 that he had made the New York Times extended bestseller list at number 30 with Dzur. He mentioned his ambivalence on this subject online. SciFi Wire posted an interview with Brust after Dzur came out.

== Translations ==
Brust's novels have been translated into several languages, including German, French, Dutch and Hungarian.

== Bibliography ==
=== Dragaera ===
==== Paarfi's historical romances ====
Historical romances, in effect, taking place centuries prior to the works featuring Vlad Taltos, with some overlap of characters. It was written as if by Paarfi of Roundwood, a Dragaeran historian. The fictional "author" regards these novels as works of history written for a popular audience, and published with great success during the reigns of Empresses Zerika IV and Norathar II.

- The Khaavren Romances consist of three works, published as five books. The third and longest work, Paarfi's account of the Interregnum titled The Viscount of Adrilankha, was published in three volumes as individually-titled books.

1. The Phoenix Guards (1991)
2. Five Hundred Years After (1994)
3. The Paths of the Dead (2002) – Vol. 1 of The Viscount of Adrilankha
4. The Lord of Castle Black (2003) – Vol. 2 of The Viscount of Adrilankha
5. Sethra Lavode (2004) – Vol. 3 of The Viscount of Adrilankha

- Paarfirotica (2012) – a short Paarfi story, announced at the author's website https://dreamcafe.com/2012/10/27/paarfirotica/ (see https://dreamcafe.com/downloads/ for text)
- The Baron of Magister Valley (2020) – a standalone Paarfi novel

==== Standalone Dragaera novel ====
- Brokedown Palace (1986) - prequel to the Vlad Taltos series

==== Vlad Taltos ====
There are currently 17 novels in the series.

1. Jhereg (1983)
2. Yendi (1984)
3. Teckla (1987)
4. Taltos (1988)
5. Phoenix (1990)
6. Athyra (1993)
7. Orca (1996)
8. Dragon (1998)
9. Issola (2001)
10. Dzur (2006)
11. Jhegaala (2008)
12. Iorich (2010)
13. Tiassa (2011)
14. Hawk (2014)
15. Vallista (2017)
16. Tsalmoth (2023)
17. Lyorn (2024)

===== Short stories =====
1. "A Dream of Passion" (1986) – published by the Ad Astra science fiction convention in its 1986 chapbook (non-canon sequel)
2. "Klava with Honey" (2005) – a prologue to Dzur, published by the Buffalo Fantasy League in EerieCon Chapbook #4
3. "The Desecrator" (2011) – published online by Tor Books

===== In in-series chronological order =====
1. Brokedown Palace (1986)
2. "The Desecrator" (2011)
3. Jhereg, prologue (1983)
4. Taltos (1988)
5. Dragon, main chapters (1998)
6. Yendi (1984)
7. Dragon, interludes (1998)
8. Tiassa, section 1: Tag (2011)
9. Tsalmoth (2023)
10. Jhereg, main chapters (1983)
11. Teckla (1987)
12. Phoenix (1990)
13. Jhegaala (2008)
14. Athyra (1993)
15. Orca (1996)
16. Issola (2001)
17. "Klava with Honey" (2005)
18. Dzur (2006)
19. Tiassa, section 2: Whitecrest (2011)
20. Iorich (2010)
21. Tiassa, section 3: Special Tasks (2011)
22. Vallista (2017)
23. Hawk (2014)
24. Tsalmoth, epilogue (2023)
25. Lyorn (2024)

===== Omnibuses =====
1. The Book of Jhereg (contains Jhereg, Yendi and Teckla)
2. The Book of Taltos (contains Taltos and Phoenix)
3. The Book of Athyra (contains Athyra and Orca)
4. The Book of Dragon (Tor paperback) a.k.a. Dragon & Issola Science Fiction Book Club edition, hardcover) (contains Dragon and Issola)
5. The Book of Dzur (contains Dzur and Jhegaala)

=== The Incrementalists ===
==== Novels ====
- The Incrementalists (2013) – with Skyler White
- The Skill of Our Hands (2017) – with Skyler White

==== Short fiction ====
- "Fireworks in the Rain" (2013) – (by Brust only), published online by Tor Books
- "Strongest Conjuration" (2014) – (by White only), set directly after the events of The Incrementalists, published online by Tor Books
- "Playing God" (2017) – by Brust only, featuring Roger Zelazny's character Francis Sandow, in Shadows and Reflections: A Roger Zelazny Tribute Anthology (edited by Trent Zelazny and Warren Lapine)

=== Other novels ===
- To Reign in Hell (1984)
- The Sun, the Moon, and the Stars (1987)
- Cowboy Feng's Space Bar and Grille (1990)
- The Gypsy (1992) (with Megan Lindholm)
- Agyar (1993)
- Freedom & Necessity (1997) (with Emma Bull)
- My Own Kind of Freedom (2008, self-released) – fan fiction novel based on the TV series Firefly
- Good Guys (2018)
- The Sword of Happenstance (2021) (with Skyler White)

=== Other short stories ===
==== Liavek shared world ====
1. "An Act of Contrition" in Liavek (1985, edited by Emma Bull and Will Shetterly; Locus Poll Award, Best Anthology)
2. "An Act of Trust" in Liavek: The Players of Luck (1986, edited by Emma Bull and Will Shetterly)
3. "An Act of Mercy" in Liavek: Wizard's Row (1987, with Megan Lindholm; edited by Emma Bull and Will Shetterly)
4. "An Act of Love" in Liavek: Spells of Binding (1988, with Gregory Frost and Megan Lindholm; edited by Emma Bull and Will Shetterly)
5. "A Hot Night at Cheeky's" in Liavek: Festival Week (1990, edited by Emma Bull and Will Shetterly)

==== Standalone short fiction ====
- "Csucskári" (Excerpt from The Sun, The Moon, and the Stars) in The Year's Best Fantasy and Horror: First Annual Collection (1988, edited by Ellen Datlow and Terri Windling)
- "Looking Forward: Excerpt from Athyra" in Amazing Stories, March 1993 (1993, edited by Kim Mohan)
- "Attention Shoppers" in Xanadu (1993, edited by Jane Yolen)
- "Abduction from the Harem" in Timewalker Issue 14 (October 1996, published by Valiant Comics)
- "Drift" in Space Opera (1996, edited by Anne McCaffrey and Elizabeth Ann Scarborough)
- "Valóság and Élet" in Sandman: Book of Dreams (1996, edited by Neil Gaiman and Edward E. Kramer)
- "Calling Pittsburgh" in Lord of the Fantastic: Stories in Honor of Roger Zelazny (1998, edited by Martin H. Greenberg)
- "When the Bow Breaks" in The Essential Bordertown (1998, edited by Terri Windling and Delia Sherman)
- "The Man From Shemhaza" in Thieves' World: Enemies of Fortune (2004, edited by Lynn Abbey), reprinted in Year's Best Fantasy 5 (2005, edited by David Hartwell and Kathryn Cramer)
- "Chapter One" in EerieCon Chapbook #6 for the convention EerieCon (2007, via the Buffalo Fantasy League)
- "Bluff" (2008)
- "Mira" in Sword and Sorceress XXV (2010, edited by Elisabeth Waters)
- "Smith's Point" in DreamForge Magazine (Founders' Issue) (Feb. 2019, with Skyler White)

=== Introductions by Brust ===
- In 1987, Tor Books published the gamebook Dzurlord (A Crossroads Adventure in the World of Steven Brust's Jhereg). Brust wrote the introduction for this book, which introduced readers to the world of Dragaera and its inhabitants.
- Tor also published The Three Musketeers in paperback in 1994. Brust introduced the edition, saying that this translation (anonymous, originally published in 1888) was his favorite.
- Brust contributed the introduction to Manna from Heaven, a posthumous collection of stories by Roger Zelazny published in 2003.
