= Good Guys (Brust novel) =

2018 novel by Steven Brust

- First edition
- Author: Steven Brust
- Language: English
- Genre: Urban fantasy
- Publisher: Tor
- Publication date: 2018
- Publication place: United States
- Media type: Print (hardback
- Pages: 316 (first edition, hardback)
- ISBN: 9780765396372 (first edition, hardback)

Good Guys is an urban fantasy novel by the American writer Steven Brust published in 2018. It is about a fictional society in which magic exists, unknown to most people.

== Setting ==
The book takes place at roughly the time of publication, mostly in the United States. A small minority of people have the inborn ability to work magic. Many such sorcerers formed an organization, the Roma Vindices Mystici, whose members are pledged to mutual defense and do not enforce their will on fellow members. In 1939 some Mystici split off to form a smaller organization, called the Spanish Foundation, which focuses on keeping magic secret, especially by stopping people who are using it for crime, and tries to maintain some moral standards in its work. The Foundation requests paperwork for even the smallest actions, and characters in the novel are trapped in lengthy procedural investigations.

== Summary ==
Nick Nagorski, a former savings-and-loan employee and whistle-blower, is using magical artifacts to kill people in gruesome ways. His goal is to kill Paul Whittier, apparently a senior employee of the Securities and Exchange Commission, who he blames for the loss of his job and his subsequent divorce. After his first attempt to shoot Whittier was defeated by the latter's magical shield, a man Nick calls Mysterious Charlie recruited him to kill members of the Mystici who are doing evil things; Charlie told Nick killing them is necessary to remove Whittier's magical protection. Nick recounts the killings and his interactions with Charlie in the first person.

However, the main story is told from the third-person point of view of Donovan Longfellow, an expert detective who works for the Foundation. He's assigned to investigate the killings with his partners, Susan Kouris, a martial-arts expert, and Marci Sullivan, a recently trained sorcerer on her first assignment. (The bureaucratic Foundation limits their budget and pays each of them only minimum wage plus some benefits.) Following various natural and supernatural clues, they come closer to identifying the killer and his motives and realize that someone in the Foundation is secretly involved in the killings.

At the site of the second murder (in New York) and the third murder (near Los Angeles) they are ambushed by someone trying to kill them without magic. Susan captures both ambushers and Donovan interrogates them in his friendly style. The ambusher in California, a dishonorably discharged Special Forces soldier named Matt Castellani, asks Donovan many questions about his description of the Foundation as the good guys. He wants to join, but Donovan says his group doesn't need Matt. Matt then makes a determined effort to join, eventually reaching the Foundation's headquarters in Madrid. Donovan's supervisor, the apparently unemotional Mr. Becker (as he's always called), and the Foundation's manager of recruitment and training, William Faucheux (who Marci remembers fondly for his help during her training), interview Matt. To Becker's surprise, William rejects Matt.

After five murders, Donovan and his team figure out that Nick's next victim will be Whittier. They go to Whittier's mansion, arriving just before Nick, who's supported by an unaffiliated woman sorcerer and assassin from Tamil Nadu named Shveta Tyaga and two hired thugs. In the confrontation, the thugs are killed and Marci and Susan are injured, Susan fatally. When Whittier makes a disrespectful remark, Donovan kills him. Marci magically sends Nick to Donovan's locked basement.

Donovan's retired partner tells him that Becker and another sorcerer named Charles Leong had carried out a similar vigilante action, killing sorcerers who they considered evil. The Foundation stripped Becker and Charles Leong of their magical powers. They conclude that Leong is the "Charlie" behind Nick's murders. Matt, who Becker hired despite William's decision and sent too late to Whittier's mansion, joins Donovan and Marci. Since William didn't hire Matt, Donovan deduces that he's Charles's ally in the Foundation. Donovan and his team capture Charles in Atlanta and inform William, and when William and Shveta come to rescue Charles, Marci strips William of his sorcerous powers and the team captures them both. The Foundation declares that they will remove Shveta's powers too. Donovan volunteers to execute Charles but frees him instead.

== Reaction ==
Charles de Lint recommended Good Guys because of Brust's "playing with genre convention", the "fresh" feeling of the familiar elements, "his quirky and engaging cast of characters", the "bright sparks" of magic contrasted with the bureaucracies of the Foundation and the Mystici, and the "delight" of the captivating story.

Carolyn Cushman found that "plenty of action keeps the story moving". Despite her annoyance at the spelling "PO-lice" in Donovan's sections, she enjoyed Donovan's "irreverent tone" . She mentioned the "moral conflicts" and said Brust was in "didactic mode".

Cory Doctorow said the book showed all of Brust's strengths. He mentioned "snappy dialogue" and "the large cast of characters" and called the book "a tight, thrilling detective novel by way of an urban fantasy".

The Library Journal review said Brust did "a solid job of creating complex, likable characters" and recommended "this twisty and clever urban fantasy" to his fans and those of Connie Willis and Jim Butcher as well.

Publishers Weekly called it an "underwhelming paranormal procedural" with too much detail, including long Skype conversations. "The detached, almost dispassionate narrative voice and the clichéd nature of the Foundation and the serial killer give the impression that Brust might be intentionally drawing out the details to deconstruct genre tropes, but the book doesn't succeed either as commentary or as a mystery."

In contrast, the review at Booklist said it was "an amusing and campy urban fantasy with fast-paced action and witty narration" and "Some of the most humorous passages occur as Donovan is navigating the red tape of the Foundation, the minimum-wage pay, and the penny-pinching accounting." (That navigation includes long Skype conversations.)

== Themes ==
A theme of the book is moral ambiguity. Doctorow notes that "the Foundation may not be on the side of righteousness" and "every one of them [the characters] believes that they are the Good Guys, even though it's clear that at least some of them aren't." Cushman says, "Figuring out who the good guys are lies at the heart of this offbeat fantasy thriller." De Lint, however, says that that is not a key point of the book, and that Donovan and his team provide a "moral center". Nevertheless, he sees "many ambiguous gray areas" and describes the assassin Nick as "an understandable if not entirely sympathetic character".
