= Patrick Nielsen Hayden =

American science fiction editor and writer

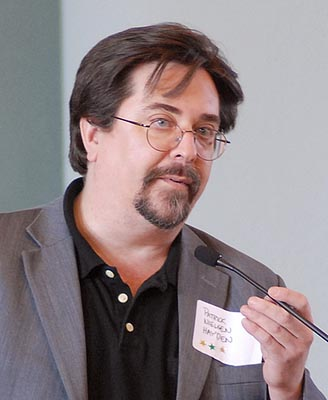
- Born: Patrick James Hayden; January 2, 1959 (age 67); Lansing, Michigan, U.S.
- Occupation: Editor
- Spouse: Teresa Nielsen Hayden (m. 1979)
- Writing career
- Genres: Non-fiction (writer); science fiction, fantasy (editor)
- Website: nielsenhayden.com

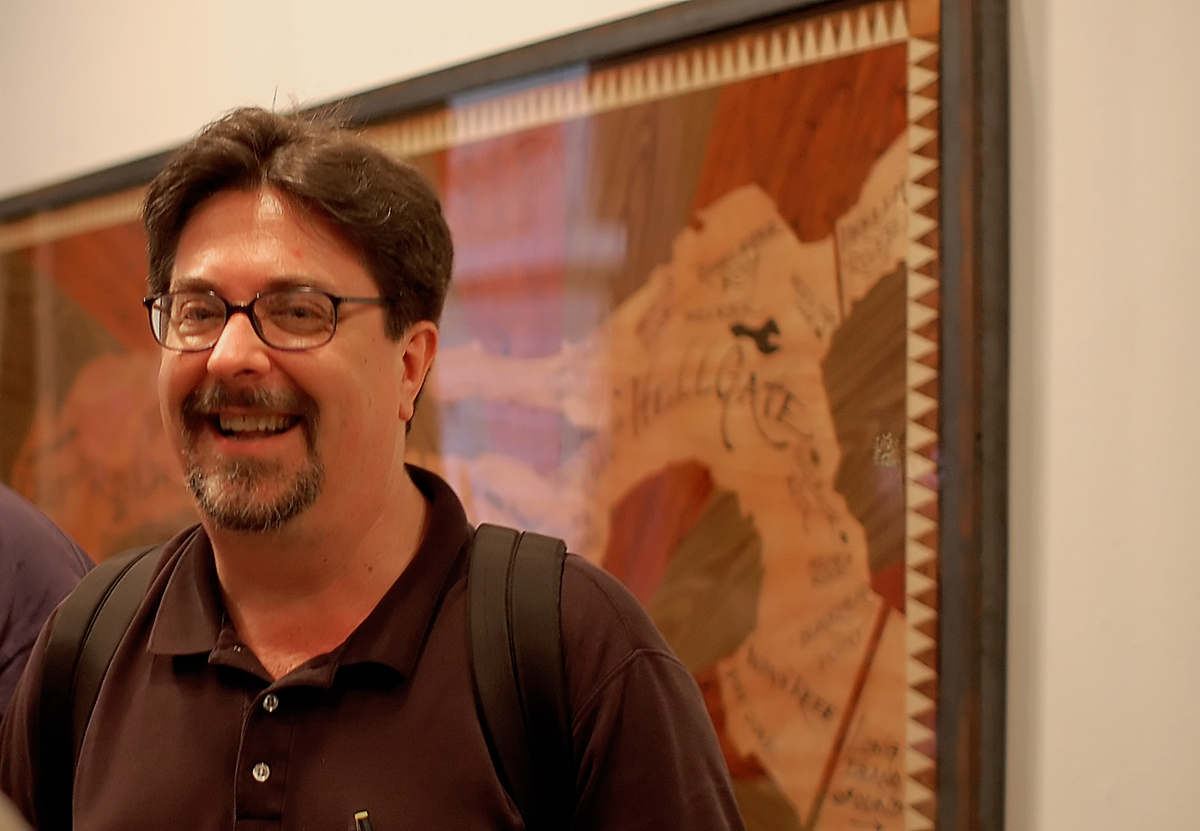
Patrick Nielsen Hayden, 2008

Patrick James Nielsen Hayden (born Patrick James Hayden January 2, 1959), is an American science fiction editor, fan, fanzine publisher, essayist, reviewer, anthologist, teacher and blogger. He is a World Fantasy Award and Hugo Award winner (with nine nominations for the latter award), and was an editor and the Manager of Science Fiction at Tor Books until his retirement on January 5, 2026.

== Life and career ==
Born in Lansing, Michigan, he was first active in science fiction fandom while living in Toronto in the early 1970s. He continued in Seattle, before moving to the New York area in the 1980s to work professionally in publishing. After moving to New York, he worked at Literary Guild as an editorial assistant, then at Chelsea House as an associate editor. He changed his last name to "Nielsen Hayden" on his marriage to Teresa Nielsen (now Teresa Nielsen Hayden) in 1979. He joined Tor Books in the mid-1980s as an assistant and worked there until his retirement from Tor Books on January 5, 2026.

He has published a number of essays and reviews. He has contributed to a number of books and magazines, including The Encyclopedia of Science Fiction (2nd edition, 1993) and The Map: Rediscovering Rock and Roll.

He is one of the regular instructors at Viable Paradise, a science fiction writing workshop held on Martha's Vineyard, and has also taught at both U.S. Clarion Workshops.

He used to be active on the Usenet groups rec.arts.sf.* in the 1990s. Since July 2000 he wrote a blog, Electrolite, until it was incorporated into his wife's blog Making Light in May 2005, where he now writes along with her, SF writer James D. Macdonald, and SF fans Avram Grumer and Abi Sutherland.

=== Fanzine editor, small press publisher and magazine editor ===
From 1982 to 1987, he edited and published the science-fiction fanzine Izzard with his wife Teresa Nielsen Hayden. He has worked on a number of other fanzines over the years, including Twibbet, Thangorodrim, Tweek, Ecce Fanno, Telos, Zed, and Flash Point.

Through their small press, Ansatz Press, Patrick and Teresa Nielsen Hayden published Samuel R. Delany's Wagner/Artaud: A Play of 19th and 20th Century Critical Fictions

From 1985 to 1989, he served on the editorial board of The Little Magazine, a poetry magazine. In 1988, he was one of the founding editors of The New York Review of Science Fiction, for which he did the basic design, in use until 2012. He left the magazine after several issues.

== Personal life ==
Nielsen Hayden is also a writer, teacher, and musician. He plays guitar and sings on occasion for the New York rock band Whisperado. He currently lives in Tucson, Arizona.

== Awards and nominations ==
- 2013, 2010, and 2007 winner for Hugo Award for Best Editor Long Form, also nominated in this category 2008–2009; also 1997, 1999, 2000, 2002 nominee for Hugo Award for Best Professional Editor
- 1997 winner for World Fantasy Award—Anthology
- 1989 co-nominee for Hugo Award for Best Semiprozine for The New York Review of Science Fiction
- 1986, 1987 nominee for Hugo Award for Best Fan Writer
- 1984 co-nominee, with Teresa Nielsen Hayden, for Hugo Award for Best Fanzine for Izzard

== Works ==
=== Anthologies ===
- Alternate Skiffy (Wildside Press, 1997) with Mike Resnick (ISBN 1-880448-54-8)
- New Skies (Tor, 2003)
- New Magics: An Anthology of Today's Fantasy (Tor, 2004)
- The Year's Best Science Fiction and Fantasy for Teens: First Annual Collection (Tor, 2005) with Jane Yolen
- Twenty-First Century Science Fiction, with David G. Hartwell (Tor Books, 2013)

Starlight original science fiction & fantasy anthology series:

- Starlight 1 (Tor, 1996)
- Starlight 2 (Tor, 1998)
- Starlight 3 (Tor, 2001)

=== Short Fiction ===
- "Binding" in Aladdin: Master of the Lamp, 1992, ed. Mike Resnick & Martin H. Greenberg
- "Sincerity" in More Whatdunits, 1993, ed. Mike Resnick
- "Return" in Xanadu, 1993, ed. Jane Yolen (also available online).
