= Yendi (novel) =

1984 novel in the Vlad Taltos series by Steven Brust

- First edition cover
- Author: Steven Brust
- Cover artist: Stephen Hickman
- Language: English
- Series: The Vlad Taltos novels
- Genre: Fantasy
- Published: 1984 (Ace Books)
- Publication place: United States
- Media type: Print (Paperback)
- Pages: 208 (first edition, paperback)
- ISBN: 0-441-94460-4 (first edition, paperback)
- OCLC: 40067411
- Preceded by: Jhereg
- Followed by: Teckla

Yendi is a fantasy novel by American writer Steven Brust, the second book in his Vlad Taltos series; it is a prequel to the first novel, Jhereg. Originally printed in 1984 by Ace Books, it was reprinted in 1999 in the omnibus The Book of Jhereg along with Jhereg and Teckla. Following the trend of the Vlad Taltos books, it is named after one of the Great Houses in Brust's world of Dragaera and features that House as an important element to its plot. Yendi is Brust's least favorite book.

== Plot ==
Six months after he took control of his own territory in the criminal Organization, Vlad engages in his first turf war with a rival boss. Each chapter's epigraph is a quote from its chapter.

Vlad narrates this story from a point in his life before the events of Jhereg. He quickly summarizes the series of turf wars and assassinations that led him to rise in the ranks of the Organization from low-rung assassin to the boss of his own neighborhood. As the story begins, Vlad has held his territory for six uneventful months, but then he receives word that a neighboring boss, Laris, has started to move in on his territory. A turf war between Vlad and Laris erupts. Vlad receives indirect help from several of his powerful friends in the House of the Dragon, but remains one step behind the better-prepared and better-informed Laris.

Vlad survives several attempts on his life, but eventually two of his bodyguards betray him and allow him to be attacked by two female assassins, a Dragaeran and an Easterner. Vlad's lieutenant had received timely warning of the attack and sent word to Vlad's friends, Morrolan and Aliera, who teleport to the scene. They kill the assassins but are unable to rescue Vlad, who is killed by the Easterner assassin. Aliera revivifies Vlad as well as the two assassins. Vlad meets the Easterner assassin, Cawti, and the two quickly fall in love. Aliera discovers that Cawti's partner, Norathar, is the former heir of House Dragon, having fallen into disgrace as a bastard some time ago. The current heir, Aliera, is looking for a way out of the position, and does a genetic test to determine the legitimacy of Norathar's claim.

Vlad turns his attention back to his ongoing turf war, now with the help of Cawti. After yet another failed assassination attempt, Vlad begins to suspect that his war with Laris is only a ruse to cover some larger plot. After Norathar is confirmed as the legitimate heir, Vlad reasons out that the genetic test that incorrectly dubbed her a bastard was part of a plot to keep her from the throne. Further investigation suggests that Vlad's whole war with Laris has been orchestrated to get Norathar killed and to discredit Morrolan and Aliera. Vlad quickly reasons out that the Sorceress in Green, a prominent Yendi, has been working in consort with Sethra the Younger, an ambitious Dragonlord, to put a Dragon heir on the throne who will appoint Sethra as Warlord. Sethra wants to invade the Eastern Kingdoms and needs to install a sympathetic Emperor to achieve her ambitions.

Sethra's namesake, Sethra Lavode, learns of her former apprentice's plans and teleports her away to deal with her personally. Morrolan, Aliera, Vlad, Cawti, and Norathar all pursue the Sorceress in Green, who leads them into a trap. Morrolan, Aliera, and Norathar fight through the Sorceress's thirty guards and magical defenses while Vlad and Cawti watch. Once most of the guards are slain, Vlad sneaks behind the Sorceress, destroys her magical wards with Spellbreaker, and threatens to kill her with a Morganti dagger if she does not give him Laris's location. She complies without hesitation. Vlad backs away and allows the battle to reach its conclusion, with Norathar killing the Sorceress.

Vlad summons his enforcers and storms Laris's office, killing him without difficulty. Later, he learns that Aliera revived the Sorceress, believing that her humiliation was sufficient punishment (and also, they have used a mind probe on her and written down all the schemes in which she is involved). Sethra Lavode tells him how she teleported Sethra the Younger to an alternate dimension to do penance. Vlad and Cawti get engaged to be married and visit Vlad's grandfather.

== The House of the Yendi ==
The House of the Yendi is one of the noble Houses of the Dragaeran empire. Members of the House are renowned for deviousness, subtlety, and their complicated schemes that are nearly impossible for anyone but another Yendi to figure out. Unlike members of most Houses, Yendi do not share any physical traits beyond a noble's point that shows their noble status. This fact combined with their lack of House colors makes it difficult to identify a Yendi by sight. The House is named after the yendi, a snake of Dragaera that bites its victims without them realizing it, killing them suddenly an hour later. It symbolizes the House's subtlety and penchant for misdirection. The Cycle Poem featured in Jhereg, which summarizes the nature of the Houses through their animals' actions, observes, "Yendi coils and strikes unseen".

== Reception ==
Black Gate found Yendi to be "flawed, but [with] the good bits far outweigh[ing] the bad", and commended Brust for "[a] style [that] requires — no, demands — the reader's attention in order to follow the plot", but noted that "(t)he story doesn’t really amount to that much. The mystery is interesting but doesn't really affect Vlad or even need to involve him," and further criticized the speed of the romance between Vlad and Cawti.

At Tor.com, Jo Walton similarly noted that Vlad and Cawti "fall in love awfully quickly and with really insufficient thought", but added that this is "how people do", and praised the "happy ending" as "still upbeat and light, even with the hardboiled tone."

== Title ==
Brust has stated that the novel's original title was "Duel", but that "when the marketing department at Ace got it, they said, roughly, 'But his first book did really well, and it had a funny one-word title. Can't he find another funny one-world title?'"
