= Skyler White (writer) =

American novelist (born 1967)

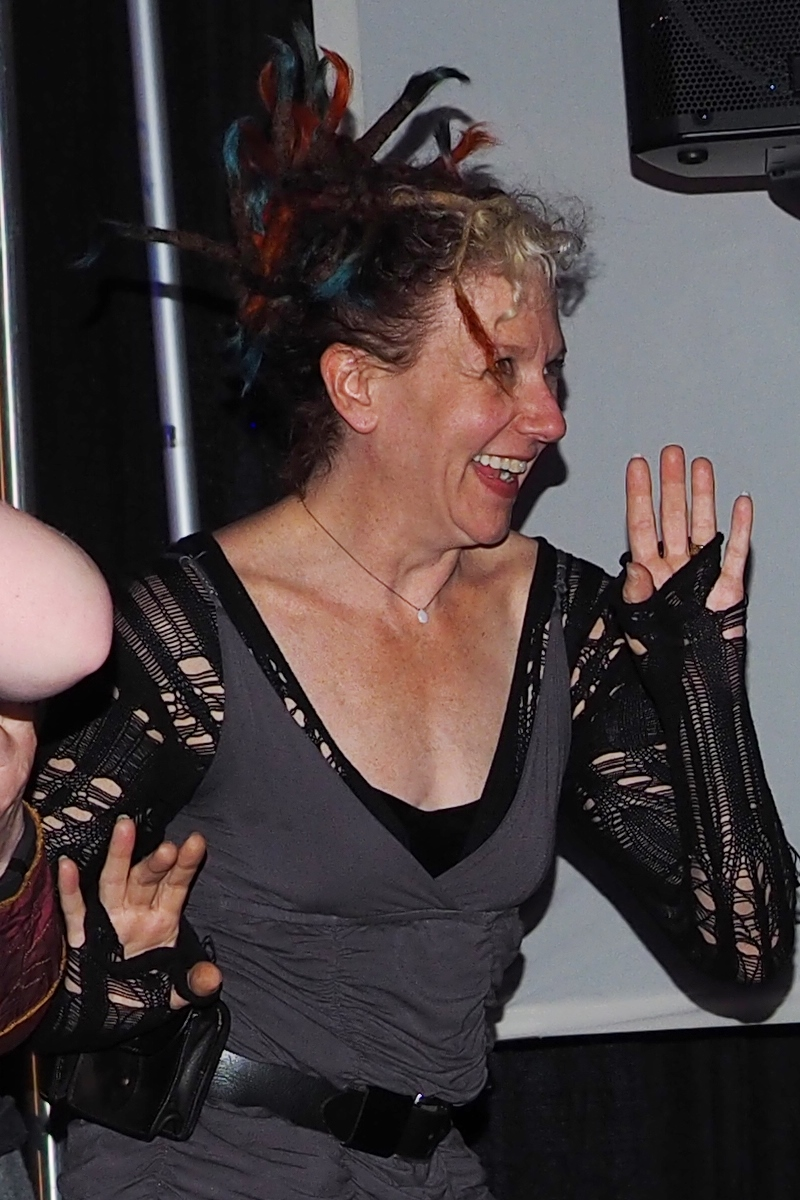
- White dancing at Minicon 50, April 2015
- Born: 1967 (age 58–59); Lancaster, Pennsylvania, U.S.
- Education: Franklin & Marshall College; University of Texas at Austin
- Occupation: Novelist
- Writing career
- Genres: Fantasy, science fiction, romance, erotica
- Website: www.skylerwhite.com

Skyler White (born 1967) is an American writer of fantasy and science fiction, including the novel The Incrementalists co-authored with Steven Brust. She is also the author of two novels in the genres of romance and erotica.

== Biography ==
=== Early life and influences ===
White grew up in Lancaster, Pennsylvania. The child of two college professors, she attended a performing arts high school, originally intending to pursue a career in ballet. She graduated from Franklin and Marshall College, where she studied English and drama. She has earned a master's degree in theatre.

Among the writers who were her favorites or her greatest influences, White listed Ingri and Edgar Parin d'Aulaire, Rosemary Sutcliff, George Orwell, Anne Rice, Tom Robbins, Neil Gaiman, Emma Bull, Margaret Atwood and Steven Brust.

=== Erotica and romance writing ===
White's first two novels were both published in 2010 by Berkley Books, an imprint of Penguin Group specializing in publishing erotica romance novels. Her debut novel, and Falling, Fly, was described as a "dark fable of desire between a fallen angel and a self-medicating neuroscientist in a steampunk hell." Library Journal named it one of the Best Sci-Fi Fantasy Books of 2010, and called it one of that year's "most unusual blends of supernatural fiction and urban fantasy." According to Publishers Weekly, the novel was "a trippy urban fantasy, an esoteric battle between myth and science told in floods of evocative prose."

In Dreams Begin, White's second novel, featured historical figures Maud Gonne and Irish poet William Butler Yeats as principal characters. A review in Publishers Weekly called it a "peculiar time travel romance," suggesting that the novel would appeal to "realists who grump when modern heroines easily abandon their commitments and expectations once in the past," and asserting that, in contrast, White "ends up treating the past as disposable instead."

White's later erotica and romance stories have included interactive stories, published as e-books by SilkWords, including two novellas about an organization called the Society of Erotic Adventurers (SEA). White has also independently published Offerings, an episodic work described as "serialized sacred erotica."

=== The Incrementalists series ===
White undertook a writing collaboration with science fiction author Steven Brust, whom she met in 2010, based in part on an idea that editor Tappan King had suggested to Brust years earlier. The resulting story concerns love and conflict among several members of a secret society of 200 people known as Incrementalists, having an unbroken lineage of shared memories reaching back 40,000 years, and a seemingly modest mission: "to make the world better, a little bit at a time." Library Journal described the protagonists as "kinder, gentler Illuminati who use words and subtler persuasion to make the world a better place."

Tor Books published The Incrementalists on September 24, 2013. The Winnipeg Free Press described it as "witty, sometimes cheeky," and Publishers Weekly called it a "philosophical and inventive urban fantasy," citing the cerebral appeal of its "layered mystery, innovative concept, and fast-moving plot." In a starred review in Booklist, David Pitt wrote that the novel was imaginative, but difficult to categorize: "It's not quite a comedy, but bits of it are quite funny. It's a fantasy, to be sure, but it's grounded in today's world and references real historical events. It's cleverly constructed, populated with characters readers will enjoy hanging out with, and packed with twists and nifty surprises. If you have to call it something, call it genius at work." Library Journal called it "an odd stepchild of magical realism, with hints of John Crowley, Tim Powers, and even a dash of Umberto Eco", while the Daytona Beach News-Journal found the book most reminiscent of a Roger Zelazny novel.

Tor has published two additional stories about the Incrementalists as e-books (also available online) – Fireworks in the Rain by Brust, and Strongest Conjuration by White.

The authors' second novel in the series, titled The Skill of Our Hands, was published by Tor in January 2017.

=== Name disambiguation ===
White has publicly remarked on the confusion of her name with a character from the television series Breaking Bad, which premiered in 2008. After the publication of The Incrementalists in 2013, White commented, "I had the name first, dammit," further noting that she had turned off Google Alerts for her name.

When asked in 2010 whether Skyler White was her real name, she responded, "'Skyler White' is the name I use every day. 'Skyler' is a nickname... but I've been 'Skyler' or 'Skye' to everyone who knows me for more than twenty years."

=== Personal life ===
White has won awards as a stage director, and her professional experience also includes advertising work. She appeared on a reality TV program in 2006, and she has described herself as an "existentialist witch." She is a mother of two, married to inventor Scott White, and currently lives in Austin, Texas.

== Bibliography ==
=== Novels ===
- and Falling, Fly (Berkley Books, 2010)
- In Dreams Begin (Berkley Books, 2010)
- The Incrementalists with Steven Brust (Tor Books, 2013)
- The Skill of Our Hands with Steven Brust (Tor Books, 2017)

=== E-books ===
- Offerings – of Pleasure, Modern + Mythic (self-published, Dec. 2013)
- Between Hedge and Manor (SilkWords, May 2014)
- Storm at SEA (SilkWords, July 2014)
- Strongest Conjuration – a Tor.com original (Tor Books, Aug. 2014)
- Lost at SEA and Found (SilkWords, Oct. 2014)
