= Jhereg =

1983 novel in the Vlad Taltos series by Steven Brust

- First edition cover
- Author: Steven Brust
- Cover artist: Stephen Hickman
- Language: English
- Series: The Vlad Taltos novels
- Genre: Fantasy
- Publisher: Ace Books
- Publication date: 1983
- Publication place: United States
- Media type: Print (Paperback)
- Pages: 239 (first edition, paperback)
- ISBN: 0-441-38553-2 (first edition, paperback)
- Followed by: Yendi

Jhereg is a fantasy novel by American writer Steven Brust, part of his Vlad Taltos series, originally published in 1983 by Ace Books. Ace later republished it in 1999 as part of the three-book omnibus, The Book of Jhereg. Marvel Comics adapted the story into a graphic novel titled Steven Brust's JHEREG in 1987.

The novel is named after House Jhereg, the Great House to which Vlad Taltos belongs.

== Plot introduction ==
Vlad Taltos, a mobster and assassin in the magical metropolis of Adrilankha, is given the largest contract of his career, but the job is even more complicated than he expects.

== Plot summary ==
The novel opens with a brief history of Vlad Taltos and a description of how he acquired his jhereg familiar, Loiosh. Despite being an Easterner in the Dragaeran city of Adrilankha, Vlad is a minor boss in the criminal activities of the Jhereg Organization. One day he is approached by the Demon, an extremely powerful member of the Organization's ruling Council, and offered an assassination job with a staggeringly large reward. The contract is to kill another Jhereg crime lord, Mellar, who has absconded with a fortune from the Jhereg treasury. Vlad accepts, despite the very short time limit.

Mellar has become the houseguest of the Dragonlord Morrolan e'Drien in his floating fortress, Castle Black. Vlad is a personal friend of Morrolan and has a standing invitation to Castle Black, which would make the assassination quite easy. However Morrolan holds fast to the Dragonlord traditions of hospitality, and will permit no harm to come to his guests for any reason. The last time a Jhereg assassinated a Dragonlord's houseguest, it resulted in a war between the two Houses that decimated both. Morrolan has invited Mellar to stay for seventeen days, but the Jhereg need the hit performed before that time. Vlad is forced to find a compromise between the interests of his House and his friend.

Vlad's other friends, Aliera e'Kieron and Sethra Lavode, are more lax on the rules of hospitality and offer their help. Aliera wants to kill Mellar herself, as it is obvious to everyone, even Morrolan himself, that Mellar manipulated Morrolan and used the Dragonlord's honor as a shield against the Jhereg. This is a grave insult to the House of the Dragon. Sethra, the oldest and wisest of the group, agrees with Aliera's position, but feels that they must still respect Morrolan's wishes and find a way that will not violate his honor.

While Vlad looks for a solution, the Jhereg come up with their own plan. The Demon first interviews Vlad to see if he would go along with it, and when it is clear to him that Vlad would not, he tries to have Vlad assassinated. Vlad manages to escape and guesses the Demon's intentions, but he is too late. He arrives at Castle Black to find Morrolan already assassinated. With Morrolan dead, Mellar would no longer be under his protection, and thus his death would not start a second Dragon-Jhereg war.

Vlad foils this solution by breaking the enchantment preventing Morrolan's resurrection and has his friend brought back to life. The Jhereg, however, are undeterred. They would rather risk another Dragon-Jhereg War than allow Mellar's humiliating theft to become publicly known. An assassin descends on Mellar, but Vlad and his friends thwart him as well.

On reflection, Vlad realizes that Mellar's bodyguards, who are always hovering nearby, were mysteriously absent during the attempt on his life. Vlad manages to deduce, with the help of some other information gathered by his second-in-command, Kragar, that it is Mellar's intention to be assassinated. Mellar is a half-breed—a mix of Dragon, Jhereg and Dzur—and intends, through his death, to get his revenge on all his parent Houses by causing two to erupt into war and leaking information that would forever shame the third. Having solved the mystery of Mellar's crime, Vlad finally realizes how to solve his own dilemma.

With the help of nearly all of his friends, Vlad tricks Mellar into thinking he has killed Aliera, which would nullify his guest-rights with Morrolan. Mellar, believing his plan is ruined, flees Castle Black to avoid a purposeless death at the hands of the Jhereg. This actually takes him out of Morrolan's protection. Vlad follows him and engages the master swordsman in a duel. While near defeat, Vlad uses witchcraft to contact a nearby wild jhereg. With this second jhereg's help, Vlad kills Mellar, earning a vast bounty and saving two Houses in the same stroke. Rocza, the name given by Vlad to his second familiar, mates Loiosh.

== The House of the Jhereg ==
This Great House maintains an Empire spanning criminal organization, which supports itself by both supporting and taking advantage of Easterners and those under House Teckla, and is secretly sanctioned by the Empire because this helps maintain efficiency and order. This House is unique in that they do not have a specific genetic identity; they are a collection of those from all the other Houses who were either rejected by their House, or failed to identify with their House of origin. They are also the only House that accepts Easterners, considered non-human by Dragaerans, into their ranks through purchasing a Jhereg title.

The House is named after the jhereg, small, flying dragon-like reptiles which possess a poisonous bite and are scavengers that primarily feed on teckla, and symbolizes greed and opportunism. The Cycle Poem, which summarizes the nature of the Houses through their animals' actions, observes, "Jhereg feeds on others' kills".

== Structure and reference to other works ==
- Each chapter's subheading has a quote that corresponds with a Great House in the order of the Cycle, starting with the Decadent Phoenix and ending with Athyra. The epilogue's subheading corresponds with the Phoenix Reborn at the beginning of a Great Cycle.
- Vlad's description of the inaction of Mellar's bodyguards as a "strange action" is a reference to a similar observation by Sherlock Holmes in the 1892 short story "The Adventure of Silver Blaze" by Sir Arthur Conan Doyle.
- The basic structure of the book is similar to that of a conventional detective novel, in that the protagonist is throughout the book faced with a mystery, collecting clues until the mystery is solved - but in a detective book, the protagonist is a detective and solving the mystery leads to the arrest of a murderer, while here the protagonist is a hired assassin and solving the mystery leads to his successfully carrying out the killing for which he was paid.
