= Stephen Hickman =

American artist and author (1949–2021)

- Born: April 9, 1949 Washington, D.C., United States
- Died: July 16, 2021 (aged 72)
- Areas: Writer, Artist
- Awards: Jack Gaughan Award (1986); Hugo Award (1993); six Chesley Awards

Stephen Hickman (April 9, 1949 – July 16, 2021) was an American artist, illustrator, sculptor, and author.

== Biography ==
Hickman's professional career was launched in 1972 when he got a job creating T-shirt designs for Shirt Explosion in Lanham, Maryland. Hickman was given virtually unlimited artistic freedom. His entry into book illustration came in 1974, when Neal Adams of Continuity Studios introduced Hickman to Charles Volpe, art editor at Ace Books. Volpe bought the printing rights of items from Hickman's portfolio, and later commissioned paintings which were used for reprints of Ace Doubles in the Classics of Science-Fiction series. Hickman then became a full-time artist. His most prominent work is Space Fantasy Stamps, a series of science fiction and fantasy postage stamps made for the United States Postal Service. These stamps are a series of five scenes that depict space travel.

== Awards ==
- 1986 Jack Gaughan Award for Best Emerging Artist
- 1994 Hugo Award for Best Original Art Work
- six Chesley Awards
