= Le chevalier d'Harmental =

Le chevalier d'Harmental may refer to:

- The Conspirators (Dumas and Maquet novel) (original French title: Le chevalier d'Harmental), an 1843 novel by Alexandre Dumas and Auguste Maquet
- Le chevalier d'Harmental (opera), an 1896 opéra comique
