= Five Hundred Years After =

1994 novel in the Khaavren Romances series by Steven Brust

- First edition cover
- Author: Steven Brust
- Cover artist: Sam Rakeland
- Language: English
- Series: The Khaavren Romances
- Genre: Fantasy
- Publisher: Tor Books
- Publication date: April 1994
- Publication place: United States
- Media type: Print (Hardcover & Paperback)
- Pages: 443 (first edition, hardback)
- ISBN: 0-312-85179-0 (first edition, hardback)
- OCLC: 29427962
- Dewey Decimal: 813/.54 20
- LC Class: PS3552.R84 F58 1994
- Preceded by: The Phoenix Guards
- Followed by: The Paths of the Dead

Five Hundred Years After is a fantasy novel by American writer Steven Brust, the second novel in the Khaavren Romances series. It is set in the fantasy world of Dragaera. Like the other books in that series, the novel is heavily influenced by the d'Artagnan Romances written by Alexandre Dumas, and is written by Brust in the voice and persona of a Dragaeran novelist, Paarfi of Roundwood, whose style is a tongue-in-cheek parody of Dumas, matching both his swashbuckling sense of adventure and his penchant for tangents and longwindedness. The title of Five Hundred Years After corresponds with the second Musketeer novel, Twenty Years After. The Khaavren Romances books have all used Dumas novels as their chief inspiration, recasting the plots of those novels to fit within Brust's established world of Dragaera. The first five books in the cycle are inspired by the Musketeers books, while 2020's The Baron of Magister Valley uses The Count of Monte Cristo as a starting point.

== Plot summary ==
After five hundred years, an older and wiser Khaavren has become the de facto commander of the Phoenix Guards. Pel continues to scheme and study the Art of Discretion, while Aerich and Tazendra live quietly on their estates. Khaavren learns that the now-decadent Emperor Tortaalik has allowed his Empire to hover on the brink of financial collapse. After Khaavren survives an attempt on his life, he learns that several key members of the court have been killed, including his former commander, Captain G'aerrth (leading to Khaavren's promotion to captain and officially taking full command of the Phoenix Guards), and deduces that a conspiracy is underway to damage the fragile Empire. A shadowy figure called Greycat has planned the murders as part of a scheme to cause chaos in the Empire and then come to its rescue, so that he may gain a place at court.

Aerich, Pel, and Tazendra learn of their friend's danger and come to his aid. They are also helped by the powerful enchantress, Sethra Lavode. Adron e'Kieron, the Dragon Heir, and his daughter Aliera arrive at the city as well, but the growing tension between the Emperor and Adron threatens to break into full-scale sedition. Greycat continues to send minions in failed attempts to kill Khaavren, while his conspirator Grita works to start a riot in the city.

Grita successfully sparks a riot that is only barely contained by Khaavren's men. The city lies in shambles and resentment toward the Emperor runs high. Meanwhile, Greycat directs his lackey, Dunaan, to hire a naive but highly skilled Jhereg assassin named Mario to kill the Emperor and gives him a fake magic weapon for the task. Greycat plans on Mario failing, but will use the fake assassination to further unnerve the Emperor. Mario does fail, but manages to escape with the help of Aliera, who now truly hates the Emperor after he orders the arrest of her father for treason. Tortaalik has her arrested for high treason for her complicity.

Adron has become so disgusted by the actions of the Emperor that he decides to start a revolt and seize the Orb for himself. He does not have the military might to do the deed, so he plans to use outlawed elder sorcery to steal the Orb directly. While Adron begins his spell, Tortaalik's forces engage his troops. Meanwhile, Khaavren and his friends, while on their way to arrest Adron, are met by Greycat, Grita, and their thugs. Khaavren and company recognize Greycat as the former Duke of Garland, who had been disgraced by the group's actions during the events of The Phoenix Guards. During the fight, Khaavren kills Greycat, and a horrified Grita reveals that he had been her father.

During the fighting, Mario returns to the Imperial Palace to free Aliera. Together, they return to the throne room, disable the Orb, and kill Tortaalik. As a result, Adron's spell is caught in a logical feedback loop, as its purpose was to steal the Orb from the sitting Emperor to give itself to Adron who is now the sitting Emperor. The spell cannot be stopped and continues to grow in power until it will eventually explode. Adron knows that he has doomed himself and the city with his pride. He uses his fleeting moments of immense power to teleport Khaavren and his friends to safety. Back in the castle, Sethra Lavode receives a final telepathic message from Adron and comprehends what is about to happen. She first teleports the Orb to the Paths of the Dead for safe keeping. She then attempts to send Aliera after it, but her teleportation spell fails and only Aliera's body and Mario, who grabbed Aliera, is teleported, while Aliera's spirit is ripped from her body and is lost. Adron's spell then explodes into a sea of chaos that destroys Dragaera City and the area around the city, a cataclysm later called Adron's Disaster.

Khaavren, Pel, Tazendra, and Aerich, arrived safely at Aerich's home in the duchy of Arylle. Without the Orb, there is no Empire. A lawless time of plague and strife called the Interregnum has begun.

== Reception ==
Terri Windling characterized the novel as "a splendid magical swashbuckler in the rousing tradition of Dumas and Sabatini".
