= The Phoenix Guards =

1991 novel in the Khaavren Romances series by Steven Brust

- First edition cover
- Author: Steven Brust
- Audio read by: Kevin Stillwell
- Cover artist: Sam Rakeland
- Language: English
- Series: The Khaavren Romances
- Genre: Fantasy
- Publisher: Tor Books
- Publication date: 1991
- Publication place: United States
- Media type: Print (Hardcover & Paperback)
- Pages: 331 (first edition, hardback)
- ISBN: 0-312-85157-X (first edition, hardback)
- OCLC: 23017159
- Dewey Decimal: 813/.54 20
- LC Class: PS3552.R84 P4 1991
- Followed by: Five Hundred Years After

The Phoenix Guards is a fantasy novel by American writer Steven Brust, the first novel in the Khaavren Romances series, set in the fictional world of Dragaera. Like the other books in that series, the novel is heavily influenced by the d'Artagnan Romances written by Alexandre Dumas and is written by Brust in the voice and persona of a Dragaeran novelist, Paarfi of Roundwood, whose style is a tongue-in-cheek parody of Dumas, matching both his swashbuckling sense of adventure and his penchant for tangents and longwindedness. Brust describes the book as "a blatant ripoff of The Three Musketeers." The Khaavren Romances books have all used Dumas novels as their chief inspiration, recasting the plots of those novels to fit within Brust's established world of Dragaera. The next several books in the cycle are inspired by the subsequent Musketeers books, while 2020's The Baron of Magister Valley uses The Count of Monte Cristo as a starting point.

== Plot summary ==
Khaavren of Castlerock is a young Dragaeran gentleman from the House of the Tiassa whose family has fallen onto hard times. Though lacking an inheritance, Khaavren has a long sword and is "tolerably well-acquainted with its use." On his way to the capital city of the Empire, Khaavren befriends Aerich and Tazendra, nobles from the Houses of the Lyorn and Dzur who also lack income. Khaavren tells them of his plan to join the Phoenix Guards, the new Emperor's elite personal troops, and his new friends decide to accompany him.

The trio arrive in Dragaera City and meet Pel, a Yendi who joined a few days previous. Pel helps the trio sign up and buy their equipment, and quickly befriends them. The four are unusual for Phoenix Guards because most guardsmen come from the militaristic House of the Dragon. The recruits are each paired with a haughty Dragon veteran for their first patrol, but each recruit kills his or her Dragon partner by the end of the night. The group is thereafter only partnered together on patrols and soon becomes inseparable.

The group learns of the standing feud between the White Sash Battalion of the Phoenix Guards and their own Red Boot Battalion. They fight a duel and several brawls with members of the enemy battalion. After learning of the White Sash's failure to apprehend a murderer, Kathana, the group decides to earn glory for their own troop by tracking her down themselves. Unbeknownst to the group, a number of powerful figures in the Imperial Court have a vested interest in the fate of Kathana. Seodra, the Court Wizard, and Lytra, the Warlord, want to manipulate Kathana's arrest to gain favor from the Emperor. The Imperial Consort, however, is a friend of Kathana's and wants her protected, as do those who wish her favor. Before setting out, Khaavren's would-be lover Illista, a Phoenix courtier seeking favor, wrings a promise from Khaavren to prevent Kathana from being arrested.

Kathana, a remarkable painter, is charged with killing the Marquis of Pepperfield, who insulted her painting. The Marquis's son Uttrik, a soldier, desires revenge for his father's death. Wanting to be rid of both Uttrik and Khaavren, Seodra manipulates Uttrik into challenging Khaavren to a duel, hoping that one would kill the other. Khaavren wins the duel, but spares Uttrik's life and allows him to join them. Seodra sends an ever-increasing number of thugs to stop the group, but the group manages to reach Kathana's hiding place: the manor of Adron e'Kieron, a prominent Dragonlord. Uttrik challenges Kathana to a duel. The rest of the group is unsure what to do, unwilling to obstruct the honor of a duel or to abandon their original purpose. They convince the pair to hold their duel in the Marquisate of Pepperfield, hoping to buy time from the journey.

The group encounters more thugs and works together, despite its differences, to bypass them. By the time they reach Pepperfield, Uttrik and Kathana have become friends and regret the events that have led them to their duel. Before the duel can commence, however, an invading army of Easterners arrives. The group manages to negotiate a peace agreement with the general of the army, Fenarr, to prevent an invasion. After the Easterners leave, Adron arrives with his army and two of Seodra's minions, Shaltre and the Duke of Garland, under orders to kill the group. Aerich reveals that Shaltre had wronged his father, the Duke of Arylle, and challenges him to a duel. Aerich kills Shaltre and Garland flees. Adron allows the group to go in peace. Uttrik swears off his duel with Kathana, who vows to turn herself in and accept her fate.

The group returns to Dragaera City, but before they can tell anyone of the peace treaty with the Easterners, they are imprisoned. Illista comes to speak to Khaavren, but he finally realizes that she is simply using him for her own ends. Eventually the group is summoned before the Emperor and Khaavren volunteers to be questioned under the Orb, which can detect falsehood. Lytra acts as the inquisitor, however, and tries to manipulate the interrogation to incriminate Khaavren and his friends. Eventually Khaavren is able to get the truth across to the Emperor, who is pleased by the group's service. He punishes many of those responsible for the intrigues, gives Kathana a very light sentence of service in the Phoenix Guard, and promotes Khaavren to Ensign.

Only Khaavren stays in the Phoenix Guard for very much longer, however. Aerich returns to his duchy now that his shame has been removed. Tazendra learns from Aerich that her own family shame was simply a misunderstanding, and she returns to her family estates, making her Aerich's vassal. Pel enters training to learn the Art of Discretion and become an influential court advisor. Khaavren continues to live in the house they all shared and keeps rooms ready for each of them should they ever return.

== Background ==
- The book was conceived during a conversation in which Brust was assigning Great Houses to people he knew and the topic led to the Three Musketeers.
- The character Fenarr is the founder of Fenario, the Hungary-like Eastern Kingdom that serves as the setting of Brust's book Brokedown Palace and is the ancestral homeland of Vlad Taltos.
- The character Kathana e'Marish'Chala is named for Katherine Marschall, an artist who illustrated the covers of Brust's early work.
