= The Viscount of Adrilankha =

Three-volume novel by Steven Brust

The Viscount of Adrilankha is a fantasy novel by American writer Steven Brust, published in three volumes. Collectively, the three books form the third novel in the Khaavren Romances series. It is set in the fantasy world of Dragaera. Like the other books in the series, the novel is heavily influenced by and homages the d'Artagnan Romances written by Alexandre Dumas, and is written by Brust in the voice and persona of a Dragaeran novelist, Paarfi of Roundwood, whose style is a tongue-in-cheek parody of Dumas, matching both his swashbuckling sense of adventure and his penchant for tangents and longwindedness. The book's format and title correspond with The Vicomte de Bragelonne, the multi-volume third book of the d'Artagnan Romances. The Khaavren Romances books have all used Dumas novels as their chief inspiration, recasting the plots of those novels to fit within Brust's established world of Dragaera. The first five books in the cycle are inspired by the Musketeers books, while 2020's The Baron of Magister Valley uses The Count of Monte Cristo as a starting point.

The three volumes of The Viscount of Adrilankha are:

- The Paths of the Dead (2002)
- The Lord of Castle Black (2003)
- Sethra Lavode (2004)

== The Paths of the Dead ==
The Paths of the Dead
- First edition cover
- Author: Steven Brust
- Language: English
- Series: The Khaavren Romances
- Genre: Fantasy
- Publisher: Tor Books
- Publication date: December 2002
- Publication place: United States
- Media type: Print (Hardcover & Paperback)
- Pages: 432 (first edition, hardback)
- ISBN: 0-312-86478-7 (first edition, hardback)
- OCLC: 50645465
- Dewey Decimal: 813/.54 21
- LC Class: PS3552.R84 P38 2002
- Preceded by: Five Hundred Years After
- Followed by: The Lord of Castle Black

The Paths of the Dead is the first volume of The Viscount of Adrilankha, a three-volume novel by Steven Brust that collectively serves as the third novel in his Khaavren Romances. It was published in 2002 by Tor Books. It is named after the Paths of the Dead in Brust's fantasy world of Dragaera.

=== Plot introduction ===
Three hundred years after the events of Five Hundred Years After, Khaavren, his old friends, and his son help the new Empress on her quest to restore the Empire.

=== Plot summary ===
A young witch enters the Eastern town of Blackchapel on a quest to find his name. After a conversation with Miska, a strange coachman, the witch receives the name Morrolan, meaning "Dark Star". He meets a fellow witch named Arra, who counsels him to pledge his soul to Verra, the Demon Goddess. He does so, and together they summon other witches to the town and build a temple. While Morrolan is in a trance, some bandits from a neighboring village sack Blackchapel. Morrolan is consumed with the desire for revenge, but he is interrupted when Miska brings Lady Teldra, an Issola, who informs Morrolan that he is both a Dragaeran and a Count of House Dragon. Morrolan vows to journey to Dragaera, receive his birthright, and then return to take vengeance.

Meanwhile, in Dragaera, three hundred years without sorcery or the authority of the Empire has ruined the land. Banditry, plague, and petty warlords reign. One warlord, Kâna, has conquered roughly a quarter of the old Empire's territory, and holds influence over another quarter. His loyal cousin and strategist Habil advises him to start a new Empire with himself as Emperor, and he summons the Princes of the sixteen noble Houses to make the proposal. The reception is generally dubious. Pel, who has become Kâna's agent, goes to speak with Sethra Lavode, and she expresses her total opposition to the plan.

In the County of Whitecrest, which has been largely untouched by the ravages of the Interregnum, Khaavren has become a broken man, weighed down by guilt over his failure to protect the Emperor and prevent Adron's Disaster. His son Piro, the Viscount of Adrilankha, has matured into a bright, bold young man. One of Piro's friends, Zivra, is summoned away on a mysterious task. Shortly thereafter, Piro himself is summoned to Dzur Mountain, the home of Sethra Lavode, on a quest. He and his companions have uneventful encounters with a bandit company and a mysterious sorceress named Orlaan. At Dzur Mountain, he learns that Zivra is really Zerika, the last Phoenix and the true Empress. He must accompany her to the Paths of the Dead to recover the Imperial Orb and restore the Empire. Their party will also include Tazendra, who has been studying under Sethra.

Pel meets with Khaavren and discovers his sorry state. Pel later contacts Aerich and together they scheme to snap their friend from his funk. They send a certain pyrologist to Adrilankha to inspect the city for signs of plague. During dinner with Khaavren and his wife, the pyrologist relates how a past failure drives him to achieve his fullest potential. Khaavren decides that he must get back into shape and help his son. He sets out with two young female houseguests, Ibronka and Röaana.

The Lords of Judgment, chief among the gods, convene and decide what to do. They note that the Empire's chief function is to help keep the Jenoine from returning. It must be restored for the good of the world. While the Orb is in their possession, they modify and improve it, and Verra decides to send a demon under her sway to help Sethra Lavode.

Zerika's band sets out and reaches the cliffs that border the Paths of the Dead. Orlaan arrives with the bandit band she commands, determined to stop them. Tazendra recognizes Orlaan as Grita, the daughter of Greycat, who was killed by Khaavren's company during the events of Five Hundred Years After. As the bandits attack, Zerika throws herself from the cliffs. Believing Zerika dead, Piro and company bitterly fight off the bandits while Tazendra drives away Grita with her superior Elder Sorcery. Zerika lands safely in the Paths and navigates her way to the Lords of Judgment. After a hard-fought debate, she convinces the gods to give her the Orb. She emerges from the Paths as Zerika the Fourth, Empress of the restored Empire.

=== Major themes ===
In the novel, the theme of a discriminating social order is prominent, and critic Stefan Ekman addresses how that theme comes out in the portrayal of the Paths of the Dead.

== The Lord of Castle Black ==
The Lord of Castle Black
- First edition cover
- Author: Steven Brust
- Language: English
- Series: The Khaavren Romances
- Genre: Fantasy
- Publisher: Tor Books
- Publication date: 2003
- Publication place: United States
- Media type: Print (Hardcover & Paperback)
- Pages: 560 (first edition, hardback)
- ISBN: 0-312-85582-6 (first edition, hardback)
- Preceded by: The Paths of the Dead
- Followed by: Sethra Lavode

The Lord of Castle Black is the second volume of The Viscount of Adrilankha, a three-volume novel by Steven Brust that collectively serves as the third novel in his Khaavren Romances. The novel is named after Morrolan e'Drien, a character originally introduced in the Vlad Taltos novels, which are also set in Brust's fictional world of Dragaera. It contains the backstory of Morrolan.

=== Plot introduction ===
Khaavren, Piro, and their respective friends embroil themselves in the conflicts between the newly restored Empire and the forces of the Pretender, Kâna.

=== Plot summary ===
Morrolan reaches his birthright, the County of Southmoor, which is in ruins. He enlists a number of Vallista architects and Teckla laborers to restore his family's castle into a temple.

Meanwhile, Piro, Tazendra, and their company pursue Grita, believing that she has caused the death of Zerika. Grita gathers up the bandits that previously fled her service and attacks again. Again the heroes quickly outfight the bandits and force their surrender, while Grita again flees. After the fighting, Khaavren, Aerich, and their companions happen upon the scene by chance and join with their friends. Pel, who is scouting ahead for a group of Kâna's troops, sees his friends and realizes that his service to Kâna puts him in opposition to them. He reveals himself and renounces his service, joining his friends once again. Kâna's troops attack. The bandits join with Khaavren, Piro, and the rest out of necessity and manage to outfight the troops. Realizing that they are surrounded by enemies, the group sets out for Dzur Mountain.

Morrolan's construction is progressing so well that he decides to build a castle instead of a temple. His retainers discover that the Orb has returned. Morrolan learns of the existence of sorcery and throws himself into its research while his construction continues. He decides to call his new home Castle Black, after the color symbolizing sorcery. During his study, he learns of Kâna's forces bearing down on his county and receives an Imperial order from Zerika to hold them off. Though he is not sure if he holds any loyalty to this new Empire, Morrolan needs no order to defend his land. He enlists the help of his most experienced Dragonlord retainer, Fentor, to see to the county's defences.

While preparing for battle, Morrolan learns of the existence of Sethra Lavode, who is technically his vassal due to her home, Dzur Mountain, residing within Southmoor county. Insulted that she has never sent him a tribute, he rides to Dzur Mountain and demands his due at swordpoint. Sethra quickly realizes that Morrolan does not comprehend the scope of her power, and refrains from killing him. After her servant calls her attention to a certain prophecy, she gives Morrolan a Great Weapon called Blackwand to stand for her tribute. She also lends him the services of the Necromancer, a demon sent by the gods to help Zerika's cause, to assist in the defence of Southmoor.

Khaavren and Piro's company ride in and are admitted into Castle Black, but they can provide little help. Kâna's troops close in and the battle begins. Fentor's hastily assembled defences and small conscripted army are no match for their opposition. Morrolan's various magical allies, including the Necromancer, the Warlock, and his circle of witches all lend their aide to the struggle, but it is still not enough. After consultation with his guests and various retainers, Morrolan decides to have his circle of witches levitate the Castle and his troops up to safety. He then has most of his army, which becomes the new Imperial Army, teleported to Dzur Mountain.

Grita joins with Kâna's forces and gives him information about Khaavren's companions as well as the soul that she has trapped within a staff. With these tools, Kâna and his cousin Habil begin plotting their alternate plans to seize the Empire. Habil gives Grita's staff to an Athyra necromancer and guides Kâna in the rituals of contacting the god Tri'nagore.

After a stay in Dzur Mountain, Khaavren, Piro, and company return to Whitecrest. Piro tells his father that he has fallen in love and wants to marry Ibronka, who is a Dzur. Having lived his life during the Interregnum, Piro does not appreciate the serious taboo of marrying outside of one's House in the Empire. Khaavren is mortified, and categorically refuses to consider such a breach of protocol. Piro leaves home with Ibronka and his friends and together they take up banditry.

=== Series continuity ===
Grita's staff contains the soul of Aliera, which became lost at the end of Five Hundred Years After. The necromancer who receives her soul is Loraan, who serves as an antagonist in Athyra and Taltos of the Vlad Taltos series.

== Sethra Lavode ==
Sethra Lavode
- First edition cover
- Author: Steven Brust
- Language: English
- Series: The Khaavren Romances
- Genre: Fantasy
- Publisher: Tor Books
- Publication date: 2004
- Publication place: United States
- Media type: Print (Hardcover & Paperback)
- Pages: 352 (first edition, hardback)
- ISBN: 0-312-85581-8 (first edition, hardback)
- Preceded by: The Lord of Castle Black

Sethra Lavode is the third volume of The Viscount of Adrilankha, a three-volume novel by Steven Brust that collectively serves as the third novel in his Khaavren Romances. It is named after a character originally introduced in the Vlad Taltos novels, which are also set in Brust's fictional world of Dragaera.

=== Plot introduction ===
The various heroes of the series come together once again as Kâna initiates his final gambit to seize control of the fledgling Empire.

=== Plot summary ===
Zerika, the new Empress of the newly restored Dragaeran Empire, struggles to win the support of the remaining sixteen noble houses. Meanwhile, Kâna enlists the services of Illista, the second-to-last Phoenix, who was exiled in the events of The Phoenix Guards. Together with Grita and Kâna's cousin Habil, the three set in motion a grand scheme to seize the Empire. As a first step, Grita spreads her knowledge that Zerika keeps the Warlock, an Easterner, as a secret, taboo lover. Because Zerika has only knowingly shared this secret with Pel, her royal confidant, Grita hopes this will discredit the crafty Yendi. Khaavren speaks on Pel's behalf, however, and Zerika pardons him.

Reunited with his eternal companions once again, Khaavren requests a leave from duty to find his wayward son, Piro. Having fallen in love with Ibronka, who is not of his House, Piro has become a legendary bandit dubbed the Blue Fox. Khaavren locates Piro's band with the help of Pel and partially reconciles with Piro, though the issue of Piro's love remains unsettled. After Khaavren leaves, bounty hunters ambush Piro's band and kill one of his companions. Piro vows to return his slain friend's heirloom to his sister.

Sethra Lavode informs Aerich that Tazendra has disappeared. Aerich finds that her manor has been scorched and a Teckla squatter has taken residence in the abandoned building. Eventually Aerich notes a spot marked on one of Tazendra's maps and deduces that it marks Tazendra's location. Realizing that the mark was most likely planted as bait in a trap, Aerich nonetheless prepares to make the journey.

As Kâna's forces descend on Adrilankha, Sethra Lavode knows that she has military superiority, which causes her to wonder what else Kâna has planned that makes him confident in victory. She prepares her defenses and sets the Necromancer, the Warlock, and Morrolan's witches to repeat the magical help they gave in the previous battle. As the battle begins, however, all magic stops working. Sethra realizes that Kâna has let the bloody god Tri'nagore loose on the world, who has negated most forms of witchcraft, and has allowed a Jenoine access to the world, which has shut off the Orb. Meanwhile, Khaavren and Pel foil an assassination attempt on the now-helpless Zerika.

Morrolan passes up participation in the battle to return to his Eastern home of Blackchapel and take vengeance on the raiders of his home and their god, Tri'nagore. Using his Great Weapon, Blackwand, Morrolan easily levels all four raider villages, then defiles Tri'nagore's altar to challenge him to single combat. Morrolan duels the god, but cannot harm him until he manages to contact his witch circle and request a canceling spell to the god's invulnerability. The spell works despite the block on witchcraft and Morrolan slays the god.

Piro and his company locate their slain friend's sister and return the heirloom. The heirloom locates a nearby source of magic and the group investigates. In the cave where Zerika originally emerged from the Paths of the Dead, they discover Grita and Illista lying in ambush with a captive Tazendra. Aerich and Tazendra's lackey Mica also arrive. A fight breaks out, but Grita and Illista draw power from the Jenoine and become invulnerable. They mortally injure Aerich and begin systematically slaying Piro's friends. Tazendra frees herself, breaks the Jenoine's protection, and kills Illista before being killed herself by Grita. Sethra, the Necromancer, and Khaavren arrive. Piro kills Grita as Sethra and the Necromancer banish the Jenoine. Aerich shares a final moment with his friend before expiring.

With magic restored, Kâna's forces rout while he and his cousin flee. Khaavren quickly hunts down Kâna and Habil and arrests them. They are executed as traitors for warring against the Orb and nearly giving the world into the hands of the Jenoine. At the victory celebration, Zerika gives various commendations, appointing Pel to Prime Minister and raising Morrolan to Duke. However, Khaavren and Pel mourn their dead friends, as their group is now broken. Together with Piro's friends, they take their slain companions to Deathsgate Falls and perform the funeral rites. Afterwards, Khaavren has no strength to resist Piro's forbidden love and allows him to return home.

=== Series continuity ===
Aerich's confrontation with the squatter is told from the squatter's perspective in Teckla, though the accounts differ greatly.
