= Auguste Maquet =

French author

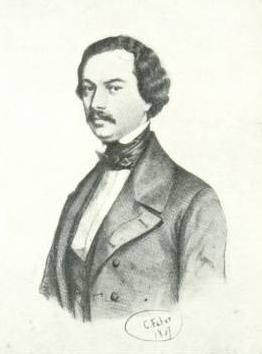
- Auguste Maquet
- Born: 13 September 1813; Paris, France
- Died: 8 January 1888 (aged 74); Paris, France
- Burial place: Père Lachaise Cemetery, Paris
- Occupation: novelist

Auguste Maquet (French: [oɡyst makɛ]; 13 September 1813 – 8 January 1888) was a French author, best known as the chief collaborator of French novelist Alexandre Dumas, co-writing such works as The Count of Monte Cristo and The Three Musketeers.

== Biography ==
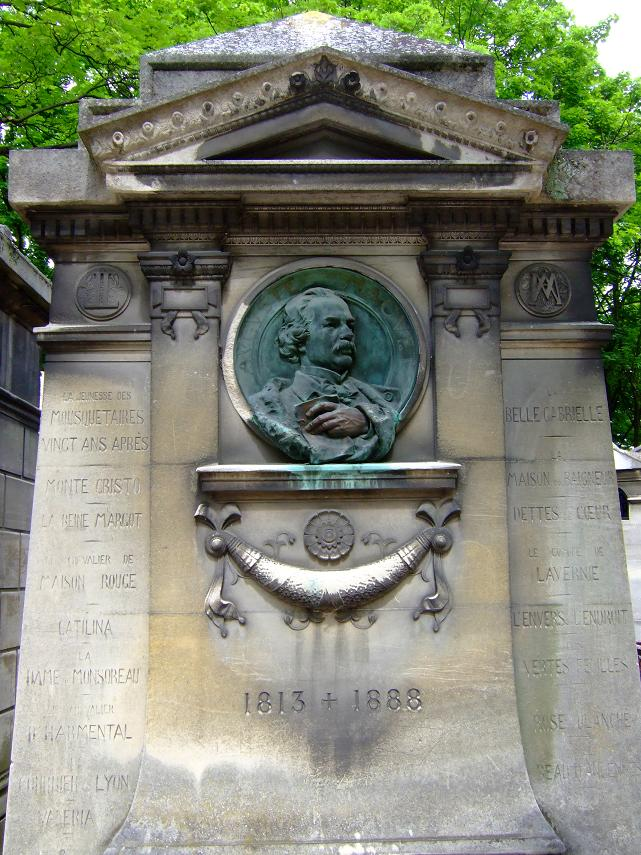
Tomb of Auguste Maquet at Père Lachaise Cemetery.

Maquet was born in Paris in 1813. He studied at the Lycée Charlemagne where he became a professor at the age of 18. Trained as a historian, he turned to literature, and became close with such literary figures as Théophile Gautier and Gérard de Nerval. Through Nerval, he became acquainted with the already famous Dumas in 1838. Gérard de Nerval introduced Maquet to Dumas and asked the famous author to rewrite a play of Maquet's and publish it under his own name. Dumas was then given a manuscript by Maquet which Dumas went on to publish under his own name as Le Chevalier d'Harmental.

The two started writing historical romances together, with Maquet outlining the plot and characters in draft form and Dumas adding colourful dialogue and details. At the insistence of and upon payment by the publisher, Maquet's name was left off the title page.

The collaboration with Dumas ended in 1851. Maquet had earlier sued Dumas demanding co-authorship and royalties, but the court found in favour of Dumas. Speaking of the court's decision, Arthur Davidson writes: "Dumas without Maquet would have been Dumas: what would Maquet have been without Dumas?" Maquet went on to produce a large solo body of work: historical romances, plays and an opera libretto. In 1861, he became an officer of the Legion of Honour. Maquet died comfortably well-off. He is buried in Père Lachaise Cemetery in Paris.

His brothers Charles and Hector Maquet were the founders of the luxury stationery manufacturer Maison Maquet.

== Legacy ==
Many devotees of Dumas claim that "Maquet was merely a dogsbody whose capacity for hard work was his greatest talent." Others, such as French Dumas expert Claude Schopp have claimed that Maquet was the real "fourth musketeer," responsible for the plots of The d'Artagnan Romances. Author Bernard Fillaire says "There is a tendency to dismiss [Maquet] as a drudge and that's just wrong...Of course he wasn't a Balzac or a Dickens...but he definitely had talent."

Maquet was portrayed by Belgian actor Benoît Poelvoorde in L'Autre Dumas (The Other Dumas, 2010).

== Works ==
=== With Dumas ===
Maquet collaborated with Dumas on eighteen novels and many plays, including:

- Le Chevalier d'Harmental – Maquet's outline was called Bonhomme Buvat.
- Sylvandire (1843) – Based on Les Mémoires de Madame la Marquise de Fresne by Gatien de Courtilz de Sandras.
- Une fille du Régent (1845)
- The Three Musketeers (1844)
- The Count of Monte-Cristo (1844)
- Twenty Years After (1845)
- La Guerre des femmes (1845)
- Queen Margot (1845)
- Le Chevalier de Maison-Rouge (1845)
- La dame de Monsoreau (1845)
- Les Quarante-Cinq (1847)
- Le Bâtard de Mauléon (1847)
- Les Mémoires d'un Médecin:Joseph Balsamo (1848)
- Le Vicomte de Bragelonne (1848–1850)
- The Queen's Necklace (1850)
- The Black Tulip (1850)
- Olympe de Clèves (1852)
- Ange Pitou (1853)
- Ingénue (1853)
- Bathilde (play, 1839) – Maquet's original play was called Soir de carnaval.
- Queen Margot (play, 1847)

=== Novels ===
- De La Fontaine comparé comme fabuliste à Ésope et à Phèdre, 1832
- Le Beau d'Angennes, 1843
- Deux Trahisons, 1844
- Histoire de la Bastille, 1844
- Le Comte de Lavernie, 1852
- La Chute de Satan, 1854
- La Belle Gabrielle, 1854–1855
- Dettes de cœur, 1857
- La Maison du baigneur, 1857
- La Rose blanche, 1858
- L'Envers et l'Endroit, épisode de la fin du règne de Louis XIV, 1858
- Les Vertes Feuilles, 1862
- Paris sous Louis XIV. Monuments et vues, 1883

=== Plays ===
- Le Château de Grantier, 1852
- Le Comte de Lavernie, 1854
- La Belle Gabrielle, 1857
- Dettes de cœur, 1859
- La Maison du baigneur, 1864
- Le Hussard de Bercheny, 1865
- Valéria, 1851 (with Jules Lacroix)
- La Fronde, 1853 (with Jules Lacroix and music by Louis Niedermeyer)
- La Chambre rouge, 1852 (with Théodore Anne)
- L'Enfant du régiment, 1854 (with Théodore Anne)

== Sources ==
- Schopp, Claude (1988). Alexandre Dumas, Genius of Life. trans. by A. J. Koch. New York, Toronto: Franklin Watts. ISBN 0-531-15093-3.
- Reed, F. W. (Frank Wild) (1933). A Bibliography of Alexandre Dumas père. Pinner Hill, Middlesex: J. A. Neuhuys. OCLC 1420223.
