= Khaavren Romances =

Fantasy novel series by Steven Brust

The Khaavren Romances are a series of fantasy novels by American writer Steven Brust, set in the fictional world of Dragaera. The novels are swashbuckling adventure stories involving war, intrigue, and romance. They are heavily influenced by and pay homage to The d'Artagnan Romances written by Alexandre Dumas. The series is written by Brust in the voice and persona of a Dragaeran novelist, Paarfi of Roundwood, whose style is a tongue-in-cheek parody of Dumas, matching both his swashbuckling sense of adventure and his penchant for tangents and longwindedness. The Khaavren Romances books have all used Dumas novels as their chief inspiration, recasting the plots of those novels to fit within Brust's established world of Dragaera. The first five books in the cycle are inspired by the Musketeers books, while 2020's The Baron of Magister Valley uses The Count of Monte Cristo as a starting point.

== Books ==
- The Phoenix Guards (1991)
- Five Hundred Years After (1994)
- The Viscount of Adrilankha, published in three volumes:
  - The Paths of the Dead (2002)
  - The Lord of Castle Black (2003)
  - Sethra Lavode (2004)
- The Baron of Magister Valley (2020)

The title of each book roughly corresponds with its equivalent in the d'Artagnan Romances. The Phoenix Guards names the guard organization to which the main characters belong, as does The Three Musketeers, Five Hundred Years After describes the length of time between it and the previous book, as does Twenty Years After, and The Viscount of Adrilankha is the name of the next generation of hero, as is The Vicomte de Bragelonne. The third novel of each trilogy is broken into smaller volumes. The Baron of Magister Valley homages The Count of Monte Cristo, another Dumas novel.

== Characters ==
The heroes of the Khaavren Romances roughly correspond with the heroes of the d'Artagnan Romances. Brust conceived of the series after assigning each of the Musketeers a House of the Dragaeran Empire.

- Aerich - A Lyorn aristocrat, Aerich is every inch a nobleman. He is an expert on the subjects of honor, tradition, and propriety, and holds himself to the highest standards of a gentleman. His reserved nature and dignified manner quickly impress those who meet him. He is also an expert in the martial arts of the Lyorn, which stress a defensive style of combat that utilizes vambraces to deflect enemies' blows until a killing stroke can be applied. He is the counterpart of Athos.
- Khaavren - A Tiassa nobleman without land, Khaavren seeks adventure any way he can. As a Tiassa, he is adventurous, friendly, observant, and prone to feats of inspiration. As he ages, his youthful exuberance fades into crisp military discipline and a keen air of command. He wields a long and slender sword with great skill learned from the fighting arts of the Tiassa. He is the counterpart of d'Artagnan.
- Pel - A Yendi nobleman without land, Pel is an ambitious and fiendishly clever schemer whose true thoughts are rarely known even to his closest friends. Pel uses his handsome appearance and rakish charm as assets, and has many female friends in high places. He also maintains a host of contacts in the Jhereg Organization. Despite his cerebral nature and small stature, Pel is a skilled duellist and a ferocious swordsman. He is the counterpart of Aramis.
- Piro - Khaavren's son, the Viscount of Adrilankha makes his first appearance in Paths of the Dead as a hero of the next generation. He is a skilled and passionate young man, like his father, but as a child of the Interregnum he is less bound by the strict cultural taboos of the Dragaeran Empire. He is the counterpart of Raoul de Bragelonne.
- Tazendra - A Dzur aristocrat, Tazendra shares her House's keen interest in battle and glory. Though she wields her massive hand-and-a-half sword with seemingly reckless enthusiasm, she is a serious warrior. She perceives the world in very simple and unsubtle terms, causing her to lose track of complex situations and rely on her friends to explain the details that she misses. Despite her uncomplicated mind, Tazendra is a potent sorcerer and is the only one of her friends so skilled. She is the counterpart of Porthos.

== Historical fiction ==
In each volume, Brust frames the narrative as a work of historical fiction that was written and published in the world of Dragaera. The fictional author is Paarfi of Roundwood, a historian and nobleman of the House of the Hawk with a distinctive writing style and voice. Through his narrative, Paarfi attempts to dramatize historical events of Dragaera that he has studied but not witnessed himself.

Brust presents himself as Paarfi's English translator. At the end of several of the Khaavren books, Brust and the character Paarfi have a comedic interaction or interview, and the two often quarrel. Brust claims to have changed Paarfi's original text in a number of ways in order to accommodate the differences in language. For example, the Dragaeran language has gender neutral pronouns, which Brust has translated into the generic male, a change that outrages Paarfi during one of their conversations.

== Writing style ==
Paarfi narrates with a distinctive voice that satirizes the flowery and verbose style of Alexandre Dumas and his contemporaries, a voice satirically analyzed in essays appearing in the Khaavren Romances that are credited to Paarfi's Dragaeran colleagues. For example, Paths of the Dead includes an essay by Brust's editor Teresa Nielsen Hayden, titled "How to Write Like Paarfi of Roundwood", which identifies 17 characteristics of Paarfi's style.

The preface to Five Hundred Years After, written by Pamela Dean in the guise of a Dragaeran academic, asserts that Paarfi writes dialogue in a historically-inauthentic style taken from Redwreath and Goldstar Have Traveled to Deathsgate, a Dragaeran play. The play's title is a scarecely veiled reference to Tom Stoppard's play Rosencrantz and Guildenstern Are Dead, from which Brust adapted Stoppard's game of "questions" into a distinctive pattern of dialogue throughout the series, in which characters must ask a question multiple times before receiving an answer.

Paarfi's writing also makes heavy use of metafiction, as he frequently calls attention to his twin roles as historian and storyteller. He often pauses the story to defend the historicity of a certain plot detail or to explain a literary technique that he is about to use. Paarfi's regular intrusions, combined with the biographical information included in several of the peripheral essays, make him into a frame tale for the series.

== Continuity ==
The events described in the Khaavren Romances take place several hundred years before the events of the Vlad Taltos novels. Dragaeran society is somewhat different in the Romances than that in which Vlad lives. The capital of the Empire is Dragaera City, which serves as the primary setting for the first two novels of the series. In addition, sorcery is much weaker and more rare. Most of the characters in the Khaavren Romances have no sorcerous ability or training, and use no magical weaponry apart from a limited supply of handgun-like "flashstones". By Vlad's time, Dragaeran society has been transformed by the abundance of sorcery and its accessibility to all citizens.

There are many crossovers between the Khaavren Romances and the Vlad Taltos novels. Due to the long lives of many characters in Dragaera, some characters appear in both series. Paarfi wrote The Phoenix Guards during a time roughly contemporary to Vlad's life, while the rest of the series was written at least one hundred years later. Some of Paarfi's other work is referenced in the Vlad novels. There are some discrepancies between the two series, but many of them are intentional. Paarfi, like Vlad, is not a completely reliable narrator. Brust has stated that while Paarfi is very well informed, he does not know as much as he thinks he does, and sometimes simply makes things up.

== Critical reception ==
Roz Kaveney, reviewing Brust's bibliography in the 1999 book The Encyclopedia of Fantasy, called the Khaavren series "the jauntiest and most likeable" of his novels.
