= Jacques Isnardon =

French opera singer (1860–1930)

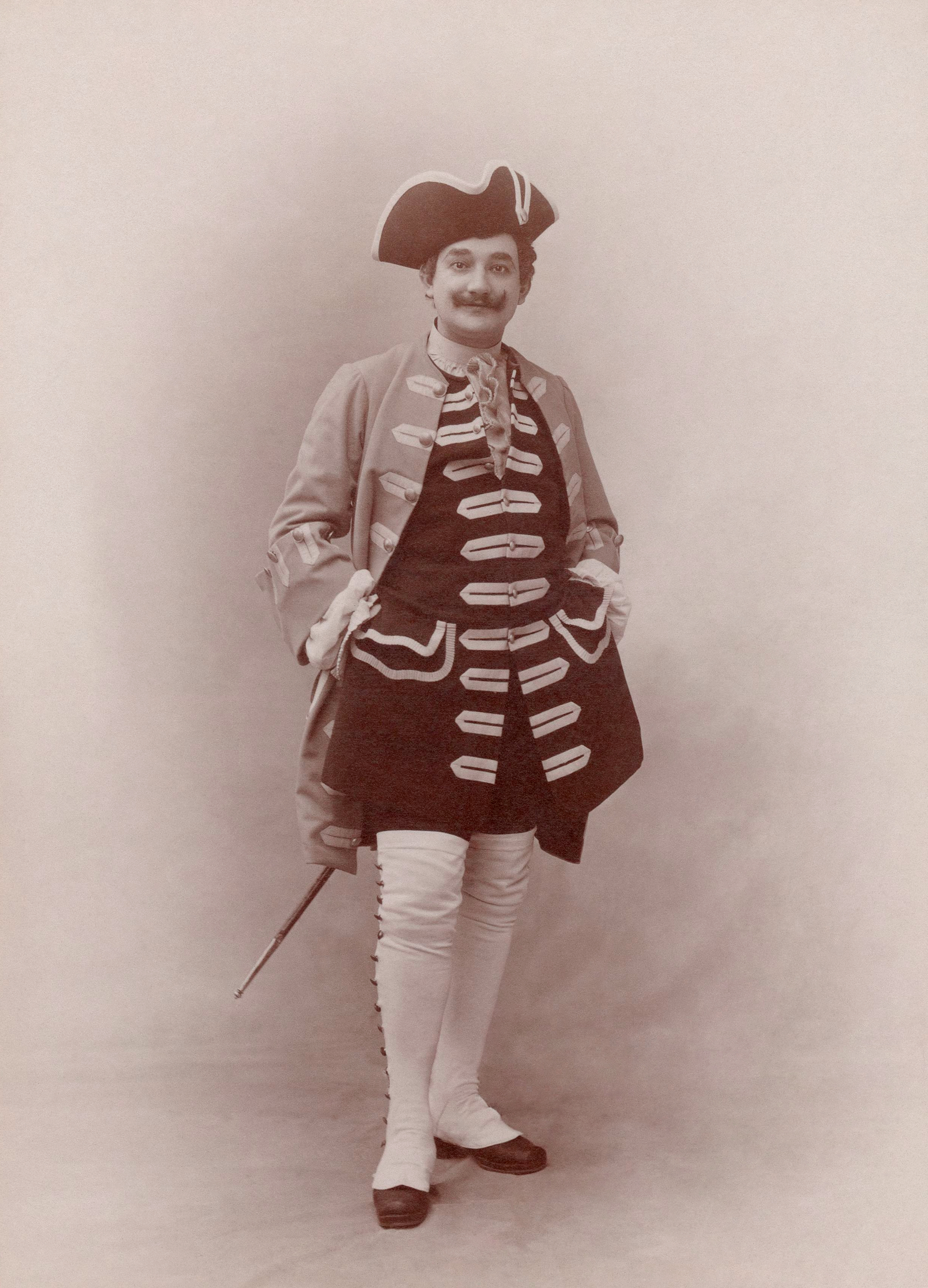
Photograph, Atelier Nadar

Jacques Isnardon (15 February 1860 – 14 November 1930) was a French bass-baritone, writer and voice teacher.

After winning a competition at the Paris Conservatory, he made his debut as Baxter in Émile Paladilhe's Diane at the Opéra-Comique in 1885, before moving to Brussels and the Théâtre Royal de la Monnaie, whose history he chronicled. He sang in Die Meistersinger at Covent Garden, Manon at La Scala and Le médecin malgré lui at Monte Carlo before returning to the Opéra-Comique in 1894. His Le Chant Théâtral is as much a memoir of his times as a philosophy of vocal pedagogy: "Herein is but one method: the new method for each pupil". One of his students was American actress, writer, and translator Virginia Fox Brooks.

He sang in the world premieres of Jocelyn and Le chevalier d'Harmental; other roles included Mozart's Bartolo and Rossini's Basilio; Puccini's Colline and Leoncavallo's Schaunard; Masetto, Lescaut, Enrico and at various times 5 roles (Mercutio, Paris, Gregorio, Laurent and the Duke) from Roméo et Juliette.

== Writings ==
- Le théatre de la Monnaie depuis sa fondation jusqu'à nos jours. Schott Frères. Brussel. 1890. reissued Kessinger 2010)
- Le Chant Théâtral (1911, reissued by Nabu Press 2010; preface by Reynaldo Hahn)

== Notes and sources ==
- Casaglia, Gherardo (2005). "Jacques Isnardon". L'Almanacco di Gherardo Casaglia (in Italian).
- Martin, Jules (1895) Nos artists: Portraits et biographies. Paris: Libraire de l'Annuaire universale, (p. 195) (in French)
