= Le chevalier d'Harmental (opera) =

Opéra comique in five acts

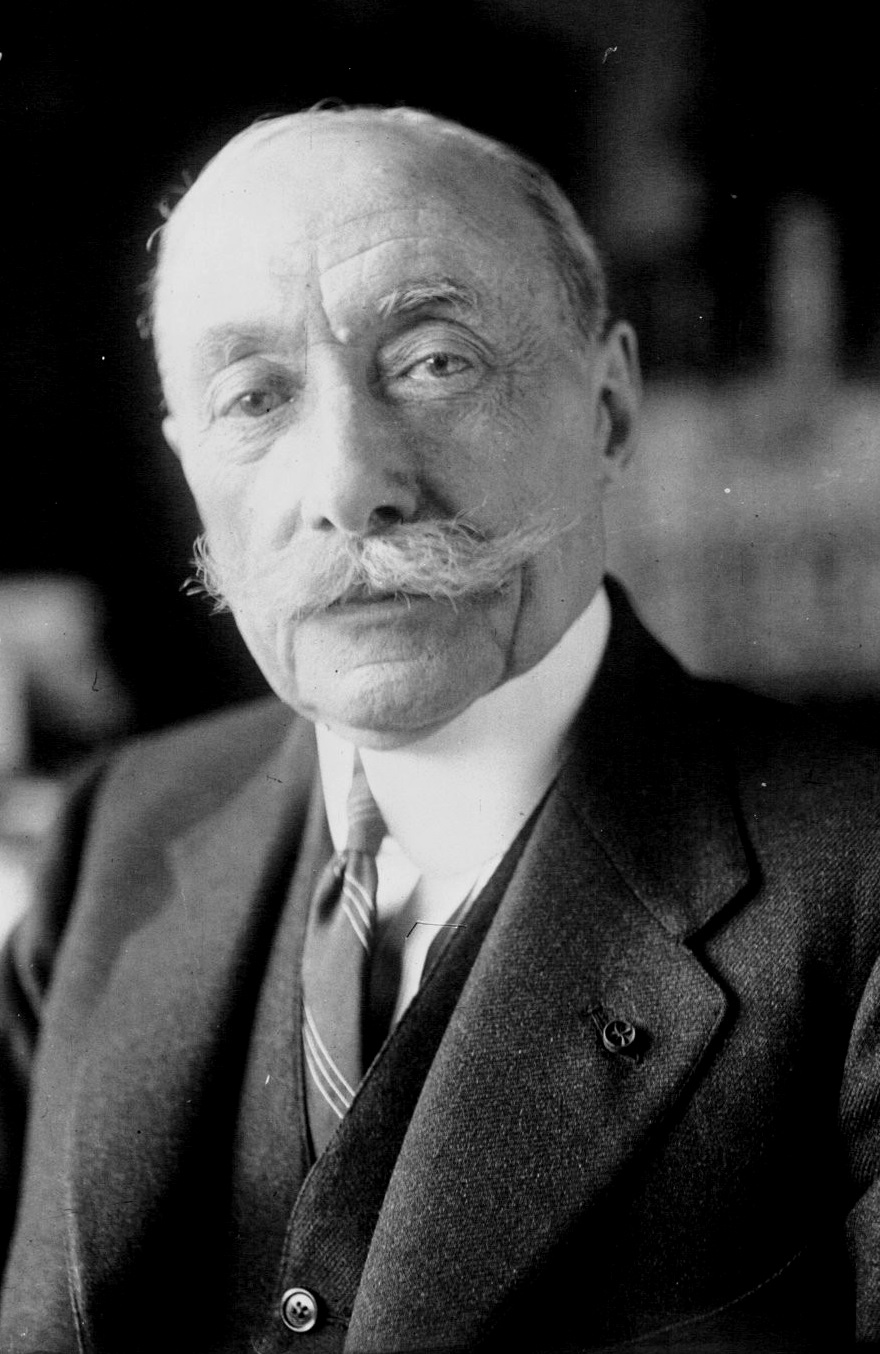
André Messager, 1921

Le chevalier d’Harmental is an opéra comique in five acts of 1896, with music by André Messager and a French libretto by Paul Ferrier, after Dumas père and Auguste Maquet. The play of the 1843 novel – in five acts, a prologue and ten tableaux – was first performed on 16 July 1849 at the Théâtre-Historique in Paris. The opera was first performed at the Opéra Comique (Théâtre Sarah Bernhardt) in Paris on 5 May 1896, but ran for only six performances. It was seen at the Vienna Hofoper during the 1896–97 season. The composer lamented that the failure of the work, which had preoccupied him for three years, hurt as he had attached great importance to it, and had put considerable effort into it; he was so discouraged that he did not want to compose, and wanted to go away to England. Messager's biographer Michel Augé-Laribé contends that the fault lay with the dull words, rather than the music, which he claims contains a prototype of the "style dialogué, juste, rapide, naturel, aisé", which will reach its height in the final works, and its beautifully coloured orchestration.

The rehearsals were fraught, with the director of the Opéra Comique, Léon Carvalho, constantly interrupting the performers over movements, actions, even criticizing the orchestration at one point; Messager responded robustly to this excessive interference. The mutual disdain did not bode well for the production. Two weeks after the premiere, the conductor Danbé wrote to Messager expressing his regrets and remarking the score was first-rate, much liked by the orchestra members who did full justice to the music. Février also comments that Reynaldo Hahn much admired the work.

The Annales author commends the attractive music, "as one might expect of the composer of Isoline and La Basoche", of which highlights cited included couplets for Fugère and the air of the queen of the night in the first act; a drinking song in the second, and several moments in the third act.

== Roles ==
Role	Voice type	Premiere Cast, 5 May 1896 (Conductor: Jules Danbé)
Buvat	baritone	Lucien Fugère
Raoul d'Harmental	tenor	Julien Lepestre
L'abbé Brigault	tenor	Ernest Carbonne
Capitaine Roquefinette	bass	Jacques Isnardon
Le régent	baritone	Marc Nohel
Maillefer	bass	Étienne Troy
Pompadour	baritone	César Bernaert
Ravane	tenor	Tony Thomas
Gargouille	tenor	Carrell
La Fare	tenor	Jacquet
Cellamare	bass	Karloni
Richelieu	bass	Berriel
Un exempt		Dufour
Daval	tenor	Rivière
Bathilde du Rocher	soprano	Jane Marignan
La duchesse de Maine	mezzo-soprano	Esther Chevalier
Mme Denis	soprano	Mlle Jane Evel

== Synopsis ==
Act I is set at a ball at the house of the Duchesse du Maine in Sceaux; Act II at the house of Madame Denis on the rue du Temps-Perdu; Act 3 on the rue des Bons-Enfants; Act IV at the house of Buvat: and the tableaux of Act V at the Palais-Royal.

Raoul d'Harmental, an impetuous young cavalier in the service of Louis XIV, loses all his position on the death of the king as a result of the accession of the new regent Prince Philippe d'Orléans. He joins the conspiracy of the Prince of Cellamare, the Spanish ambassador, an envoy of Alberoni, who is at the heart of a plot involving the Duke and Duchess of Maine, which aims to capture the royal regent at a party, then gather together the Etats-Généraux and confer the regency on the King of Spain, Philippe V. While awaiting the moment of the abduction Raoul d'Harmental falls in love Bathilde du Rocher. The conspiracy does not succeed, but in the opera Buvat pleads for the life of Raoul and for the marriage of the chevalier with Bathilde, with which the work ends.
