= Virginia Fox Brooks =

American dramatist (1893–1971)

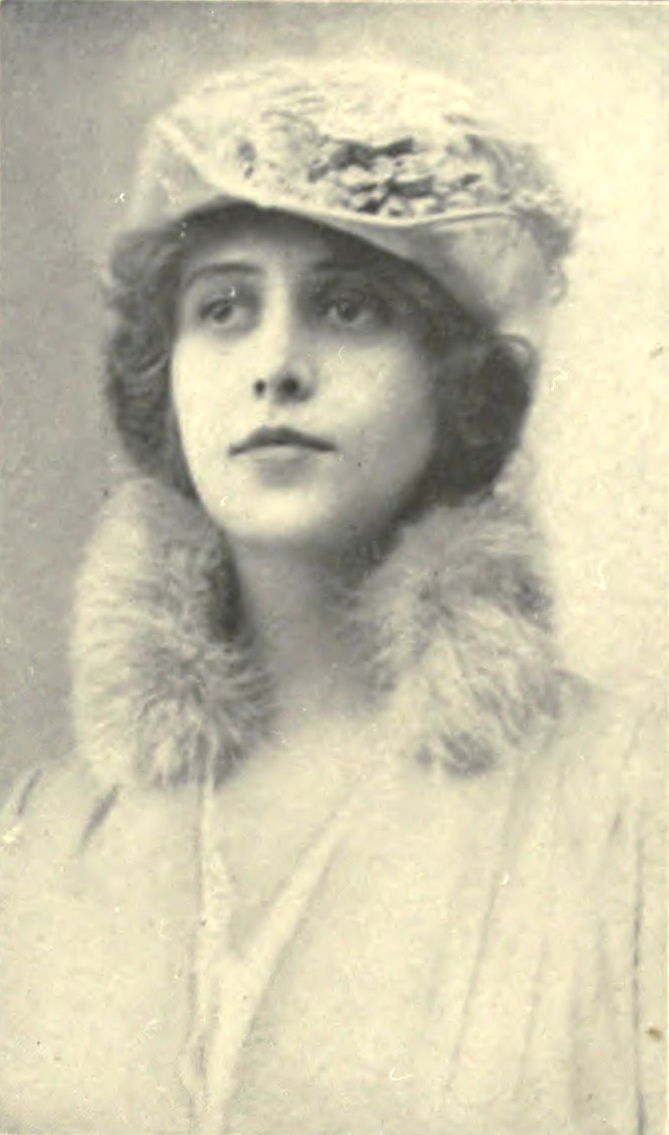
- Virginia Fox Brooks, from a 1916 publication.
- Born: January 29, 1893
- Died: 1971 (aged 77–78)
- Other names: Virginia Fox-Brooks Vernon, Virginia Vernon (after marriage)
- Occupations: Actress; writer; journalist; translator
- Known for: Chief Welfare Officer, ENSA, during World War II
- Notable work: translations of works by Noël Coward

Virginia Fox Brooks MBE (January 29, 1893 – 1971), also known as Virginia Fox-Brooks Vernon or Virginia Vernon, was an American actress, playwright, translator, and journalist. With her husband, Frank Vernon, she translated dramatic works into English. During World War II, she worked with the Entertainment National Service Association (ENSA) to produce shows for the troops.

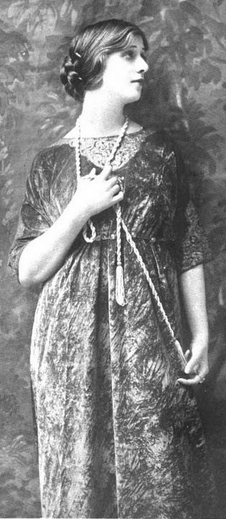
Virginia Fox Brooks, from a 1918 publication.

== Early life ==
Virginia Fox Brooks was born January 29, 1893, the daughter of Joseph Brooks, a theatre manager. (Some sources give her birthdate as 1894 or 1899.) Her parents were from Tennessee and Virginia. She studied music in France with Jacques Isnardon at the Paris Conservatory, and toured in Europe with singer Yvette Guilbert as a young woman. "If I ever do anything really fine," Brooks said of Guilbert in 1919, "I feel that I shall owe it to her, to the privilege of daily association with so marvelous an artist, to all that I have learned through my intimate friendship with her."

== Stage and writing ==
Fox Brooks sang at the Opéra-Comique in Paris. She appeared on Broadway in The Adventures of Lady Ursula (1915), Trilby (1915), Ghosts (1915), The Great Lover (1915–1916), Getting Married (1916–1917), Sinbad (1918–1919), and The Passing Show of 1918. She also appeared in the London productions of The Great Lover (1920–1921), and The Love Match (1922).

With her husband, Frank Vernon, she co-wrote the English versions of French and Russian plays, including Simon Gantillon's Maya (1928), René Berton's After Death (1928), Vladimir Kirshon's Red Rust (1930), Alfred Savoir's Little Catherine (1931), The Poet's Secret (1933), Henry Bordeaux's Shattered (1935), Quet's (1935), and Sacha Guitry's Villa for Sale (1963). She also adapted Journey's End into French with Lucien Besnard (1930), Laurence Housman's Victoria Regina (1937) into French with André Maurois, and translated Noël Coward's Private Lives into French in 1933, and she went on to translate other works by Coward, including Blithe Spirit.

The Vernons co-wrote The Diary of a Murderer (1934, based on Tristan Bernard's Aux Abois), and co-edited Modern One-Act Plays from the French (1935). Other books by Virginia Vernon included Beauty Products (a novel), Parcel Parade (1939, another novel), and Enchanting Little Lady (1964, a biography).

== World War II and after ==
Vernon's husband died early in World War II, in France. During the war she was involved in organizing entertainment for the troops as Chief Welfare Officer with ENSA, and traveled extensively, from India, China, and Thailand to Iceland, Tunisia, and Egypt. She landed at Normandy soon after D-Day. For her war work, she was given an MBE, as well as five campaign medals.

In 1947 she wrote about Canadian topics for the Daily Mirror. She judged and spoke at a regional drama festival in Quebec that year, and became a member of the Société des Auteurs et Compositeurs Dramatiques. In 1950 and 1951 she reported on fashion news from Paris.

== Personal life ==
Virginia Fox Brooks married British theatrical producer Frank Vernon in 1925, as his second wife. She was widowed when Frank died in 1940, in France. Some of her papers are in the Imperial War Museum Department of Documents.
