= Twenty Years After =

1845 novel by Alexandre Dumas

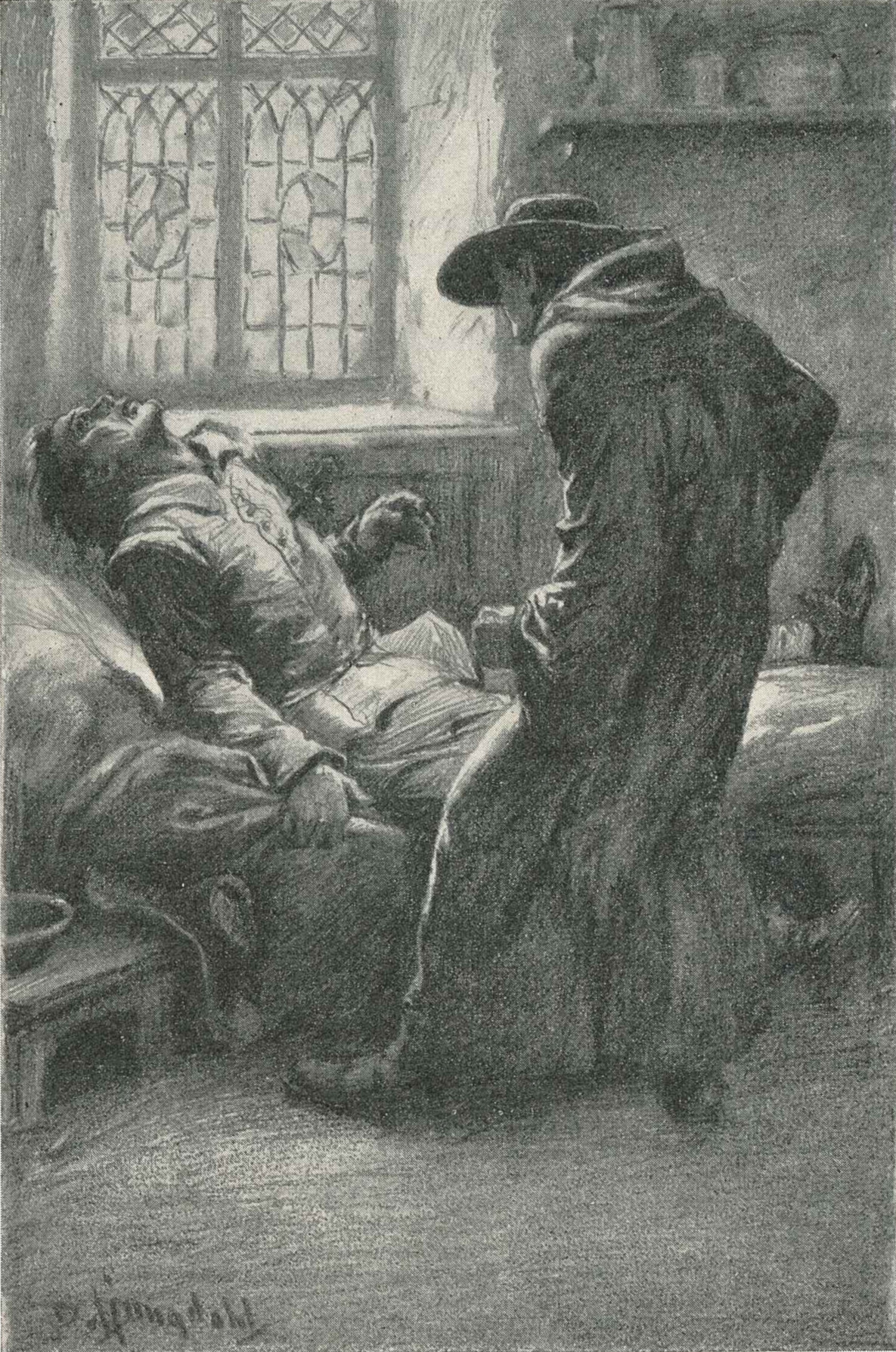
- Milady's son murders his mother's executioner.
- Author: Alexandre Dumas in collaboration with Auguste Maquet
- Original title: Vingt ans après
- Language: French
- Genre: Historical, romantic
- Publication date: January to August 1845
- Publication place: France
- Preceded by: The Three Musketeers, The Count of Moret, The Dove
- Followed by: The Vicomte of Bragelonne: Ten Years Later

Twenty Years After (French: Vingt ans après) is a novel by Alexandre Dumas, first serialized from January to August 1845. A book of The d'Artagnan Romances, it is a sequel to The Three Musketeers (1844) and precedes the 1847–1850 novel The Vicomte de Bragelonne (which includes the sub-plot Man in the Iron Mask).

The novel follows events in France during the Fronde, during the childhood reign of Louis XIV, and in England near the end of the English Civil War, leading up to the victory of Oliver Cromwell and the execution of King Charles I. Through the words of the main characters, particularly Athos, Dumas comes out on the side of the monarchy in general, or at least the text often praises the idea of benevolent royalty. Setting aside their political differences, the musketeers are valiant and just in their efforts to save the doomed Charles I.

== Synopsis ==
=== D'Artagnan and Mazarin ===
The action begins during the regency of Queen Anne of Austria (term 1643–1651), with Cardinal Mazarin as First Minister. D'Artagnan, who seemed to have a promising career ahead of him at the end of The Three Musketeers, has for twenty years remained a lieutenant, and seems unlikely to progress despite his ambition and the debt the Queen owes to him. He is summoned by Mazarin, who requires an escort; the French people detest Mazarin, and are on the brink of rebellion (La Fronde). D'Artagnan is sent to the Bastille to retrieve a prisoner, who turns out to be his former adversary, and then a friend, the Comte de Rochefort.

Rochefort is brought to an audience with Mazarin, where he learns that the cause for his imprisonment was his refusal to serve Mazarin five years ago. When asked about reliable and resourceful men that Mazarin can employ, Rochefort tells Mazarin about the respect and awe d'Artagnan and his friends commanded in old times. Though Rochefort offers his services to Mazarin, he immediately refuses to watch over the imprisoned Duc de Beaufort, his personal friend. Mazarin orders the return of the prisoner to the Bastille, but on his way there Rochefort escapes.

Having determined that d'Artagnan is the man he seeks, Mazarin enters the chambers of the Queen to let her know that he has enlisted the man who had served her so well twenty years earlier (in adventures covered in The Three Musketeers). The Queen, feeling guilty for having forgotten d'Artagnan's service, gives Mazarin a diamond ring to return to d'Artagnan, one which she had previously given him that d'Artagnan sold. The avaricious Mazarin merely uses the diamond to show d'Artagnan that he is once again to enter the Queen's service. He commissions d'Artagnan to go in search of his friends.

=== Reunion of the four musketeers ===
D'Artagnan is at a loss; he has completely lost touch with his friends, who have resumed their real names. Athos, the Comte de la Fère, had returned to his estate near Blois; Porthos, Monsieur du Vallon, had married a rich lawyer's widow; and Aramis became a priest, the Abbé d'Herblay. Fortune intervenes when Planchet, his old servant, enters d'Artagnan's chambers, attempting to escape arrest for aiding the escape of Rochefort. Through Planchet, he locates Bazin, Aramis' old servant, now beadle at Notre Dame. Though Bazin is unwilling to help, d'Artagnan is able to find out, through an altar boy, that Bazin makes frequent visits to Noisy. D'Artagnan and Planchet go there, where they are set upon by a group who think them Frondeurs while outside the house of Madame de Longueville. When this group is satisfied that d'Artagnan is not the man they seek, Aramis surprises Planchet by dropping onto his horse from the tree in which he had been hiding.

D'Artagnan finds that the former musketeer, who had thought of little other than being a priest, is now a priest who thinks of little other than being a soldier. Aramis is not willing to enter into Mazarin's service, however. D'Artagnan leaves but waits in hiding, suspecting that Aramis is both the Frondeur who had been sought earlier and the lover of Madame de Longueville. His suspicions are confirmed.

The visit to Aramis was not fruitless, as it yielded the address of Porthos. When d'Artagnan arrives at Porthos' estate he finds Mousqueton, who is overjoyed to meet d'Artagnan and Planchet. He finds that Porthos, despite his wealth and life spent in pursuit of amusement, is not happy. Porthos who envies nobles of high origin desires to become a baron, and with this bait d'Artagnan lures him into Mazarin's service.

D'Artagnan continues his search for Athos, whom he finds almost completely changed, set to live as an example to his ward, Raoul. Though Athos will not be enlisted into Mazarin's service, and indeed reveals that his sympathies lie against Mazarin, the two arrange to meet again in Paris. Athos wishes to bring Raoul there to help him to become a gentleman, and also to separate him from Louise de la Vallière, a seven-year-old girl living nearby, with whom Raoul is obsessively in love. In Paris, Athos visits Madame de Chevreuse, an influential court politician and a former mistress of Aramis, with whom, under the name Marie Michon, Aramis had much communication in The Three Musketeers. Athos reveals, discreetly, that Raoul is the son born of a chance encounter that Athos had with her, and through her gets a letter of recommendation for Raoul to join the army.

=== The Duc de Beaufort ===
The scene then changes, to focus on the Duc de Beaufort, Mazarin's prisoner at Vincennes, who finds a new jailer, Athos' servant, the silent Grimaud. Grimaud instantly makes himself disagreeable to the Duc, as part of an escape plot. Using messages passed to Rochefort using tennis balls, they arrange to have a meal on Whitsuntide, to which La Ramée, second in command of the prison, is invited. The escape is successful, but d'Artagnan and Porthos, on Mazarin's orders, are in pursuit.

After a race against time, and having defeated several adversaries along the way, Porthos and d'Artagnan find themselves on a dark road, surrounded, with swords crossed against adversaries equal to them, who are revealed to be Athos and Aramis. The four arrange to meet in Paris at the Place Royale. In a dramatic scene, the four friends come close to fighting each other, yet stop, reconcile, and renew their vows of friendship, which they value higher than any political alliances.

=== Mordaunt ===
Raoul is travelling to join the army that wages a war against Spain under the command of Prince de Condé. On the road, he saves the life of a young nobleman, Comte de Guiche, and the two become friends. Two days later, de Guiche saves Raoul's life in a skirmish with Spanish soldiers. After they defeat their enemies, they find a church servant close to death who requests the last rites. They help him to a nearby inn and find a traveling monk. When the monk does not seem inclined to perform this service, they have to force him to go to the inn.

At the confession, the man reveals that he has been the official executioner in the town of Béthune for many years, yet his only regret is that he took part in the execution of some noble woman, Milady de Winter, twenty years ago. The monk reveals himself as her son, John Francis de Winter, who calls himself Mordaunt after Charles I stripped him of all his titles. Mordaunt stabs the executioner. Grimaud, who is travelling to join Raoul, arrives to the inn just in time to learn, from the dying man, about Mordaunt's existence and rushes back to warn Athos.

After joining the army of Prince de Condé, Raoul proves himself by assisting the Prince in interrogating a prisoner. The information that Conde acquires from the prisoner helps him to a decisive victory in the Battle of Lens. In a short time, 15-year-old Raoul earns a reputation of a valiant soldier and becomes a Prince de Condé favorite.

D'Artagnan and Porthos help Queen Anne of Austria, the young Louis XIV and Mazarin escape Paris after its citizens finally start a rebellion. The champion of the French populace and parliament, Pierre Broussel, is arrested, but then released when it becomes clear that his imprisonment has only served to stir the crowd up worse. D'Artagnan meets the young king and watches over him as some Frondeurs—including Planchet, under a false name—who wanted to make sure that the king and queen were not about to escape, enter the king's bedroom demanding to see him. Immediately after this, he contrives for all of the royal household to escape from Paris anyway, bluffing his way past Planchet at the gates (the two men retain their friendship despite their differing allegiances in this conflict).

Cardinal Mazarin sends d'Artagnan and Porthos to England with a message for Oliver Cromwell, the leader of the British Parliament's army fighting King Charles I's, and orders them to stay there under Cromwell's command. At the same time, Queen Henrietta of England meets the Musketeers' old English friend, Lord de Winter—a Royalist come to ask for French assistance for King Charles I of England, her husband, in the English Civil War and sends Athos and Aramis to England as well. So once again the two pairs of Musketeers find themselves on opposite sides. Departing for England, Mordaunt, who has been following Lord de Winter, sees him with Athos and Aramis and learns that they were participants of his mother's makeshift trial and execution twenty years ago.

=== In England ===
King Charles I is betrayed by the leaders of the Scottish troops he commands and taken prisoner. Mordaunt, a favorite of Cromwell's, murders his uncle, Lord de Winter, Milady's brother-in-law, and attempts to lay hands on Athos and Aramis, when the duo are the last men to defend Charles I. However, Athos and Aramis are captured by d'Artagnan and Porthos who are fighting under Cromwell's troops. As soon as they have a chance to converse, Athos talks d'Artagnan and Porthos into helping to save Charles I. D'Artagnan and Porthos free their friends and start plotting to save the imprisoned king.

In the end, all their plans fail and Mordaunt turns to regicide, executing King Charles I after d'Artagnan and the three former Musketeers have kidnapped London's official executioner in order to prevent this. D'Artagnan and his friends later confront Mordaunt at Cromwell's secret residence, but in the course of a duel with d'Artagnan he escapes through a secret passage.

The Frenchmen and their servants leave England by ship, but Mordaunt gets aboard and blows it up. Unfortunately for him, the Musketeers' servants had earlier discovered the explosives on board, roused their masters, and contrived to steal the only lifeboat before the ship can blow up, leaving Mordaunt aboard. Mordaunt escapes the blast, and pleads with the Musketeers to let him into their boat. With the exception of Athos, they contemptuously reject his appeals. Athos insists on saving him, but as he helps him into the boat, Mordaunt deliberately drags him under the water where they struggle and Mordaunt is killed.

Athos rejoins the others, stating: "I had a son. I wanted to live." This seems to confirm what d'Artagnan has long suspected, that the reason Athos's ward, Raoul de Bragelonne whom he adopted after he was abandoned by his mother, bears such a resemblance to him is because he is Athos's natural son. Athos further states that "It was not me who killed him. It was fate."

=== Finale ===
Once back in France, the four friends go separate ways. D'Artagnan and Porthos head to Paris through a different route from Athos and Aramis, knowing that Mazarin will not forgive their disobedience. Aramis and Athos reach Paris only to find out that their friends have not. After looking for D'Artagnan and Porthos, they learn the duo has been imprisoned by Mazarin in Rueil. Athos tries to persuade Queen Anne to free his friends, but is imprisoned as well.

After this, d'Artagnan manages to escape with Porthos and capture Mazarin. Mazarin is taken to one of Porthos's castles and he makes some concessions to the four friends in exchange for his freedom. These include making Porthos a baron and making d'Artagnan a captain of Musketeers. Athos asks for nothing: Aramis asks for concessions towards himself and his friends in the Fronde. These concessions are later accepted by Queen Anne, who finally realizes she has been rather ungrateful to d'Artagnan and his friends.

At the end of the novel, the first Fronde comes to an end and Mazarin, Queen Anne, and Louis XIV enter Paris. A riot takes place during which d'Artagnan accidentally kills Rochefort and Porthos kills Bonacieux (who in the earlier novel was d'Artagnan's landlord and an agent of Richelieu and is now a beggar and Frondist). At the end the four friends once again go their separate ways. D'Artagnan stays in Paris with Mazarin and Queen Anne; Athos returns to la Fère; Aramis returns to his abbey in Noisy le Sec; and Porthos returns to his castle to enjoy his baronage.

== English translations ==
- William Barrow (1846)
- William Robson (1856)
- Alfred Richard Allinson (1904)
- David Coward (Oxford World's Classics) (2009)
- Lawrence Ellsworth (2019–2020) – 2 volumes

== Adaptations ==
In 1967, the BBC aired a 16-episode television adaptation by Alexander Baron titled The Further Adventures of the Musketeers, based on Twenty Years After, with Joss Ackland as d'Artagnan, Jeremy Young as Athos, Brian Blessed as Porthos and John Woodvine as Aramis. It was released on DVD in 2016.

The 1989 film The Return of the Musketeers is loosely based on Twenty Years After; it was filmed 15 years after the films The Three Musketeers (1973) and The Four Musketeers (1974), with the same director and main cast.

The 1992 Russian musical film Musketeers Twenty Years After is a direct adaptation of Twenty Years After; it was filmed 14 years after the 1978 musical miniseries D'Artagnan and Three Musketeers, with the same director and main cast.

The 1994 fantasy novel Five Hundred Years After by Steven Brust, the second book in the Khaavren Romances series, is loosely inspired by Twenty Years After.
