= The Baron of Magister Valley =

2020 novel in the Khaavren Romances series by Steven Brust

- Author: Steven Brust
- Language: English
- Series: The Khaavren Romances
- Genre: Fantasy
- Publisher: Tor Books
- Publication date: July 28, 2020
- Publication place: United States
- ISBN: 978-1-250-31146-7
- Preceded by: Sethra Lavode

The Baron of Magister Valley is a fantasy novel by American writer Steven Brust, set in the fictional world of Dragaera and part of the Khaavren Romances. Like the other books in that series, the novel is heavily influenced by The Count of Monte Cristo by Alexandre Dumas, and is written by Brust in the voice and persona of a Dragaeran novelist, Paarfi of Roundwood, whose style is a tongue-in-cheek parody of Dumas, matching both his swashbuckling sense of adventure and his penchant for tangents and longwindedness.

The Khaavren Romances books have all used Dumas novels (particularly the Three Musketeers series) as their chief inspiration, recasting the plots of those novels to fit within Brust's established world of Dragaera. The Baron of Magister Valley follows suit, using The Count of Monte Cristo as a starting point.

== Plot summary ==
A young Dragaeran, Eremit, is sent by his parents to investigate a plot against the family for control of their lucrative mines. He is kidnapped and imprisoned on a volcanic island for more than 600 years, where he dreams of taking his revenge.
