= The Three Musketeers =

1844 novel by Alexandre Dumas

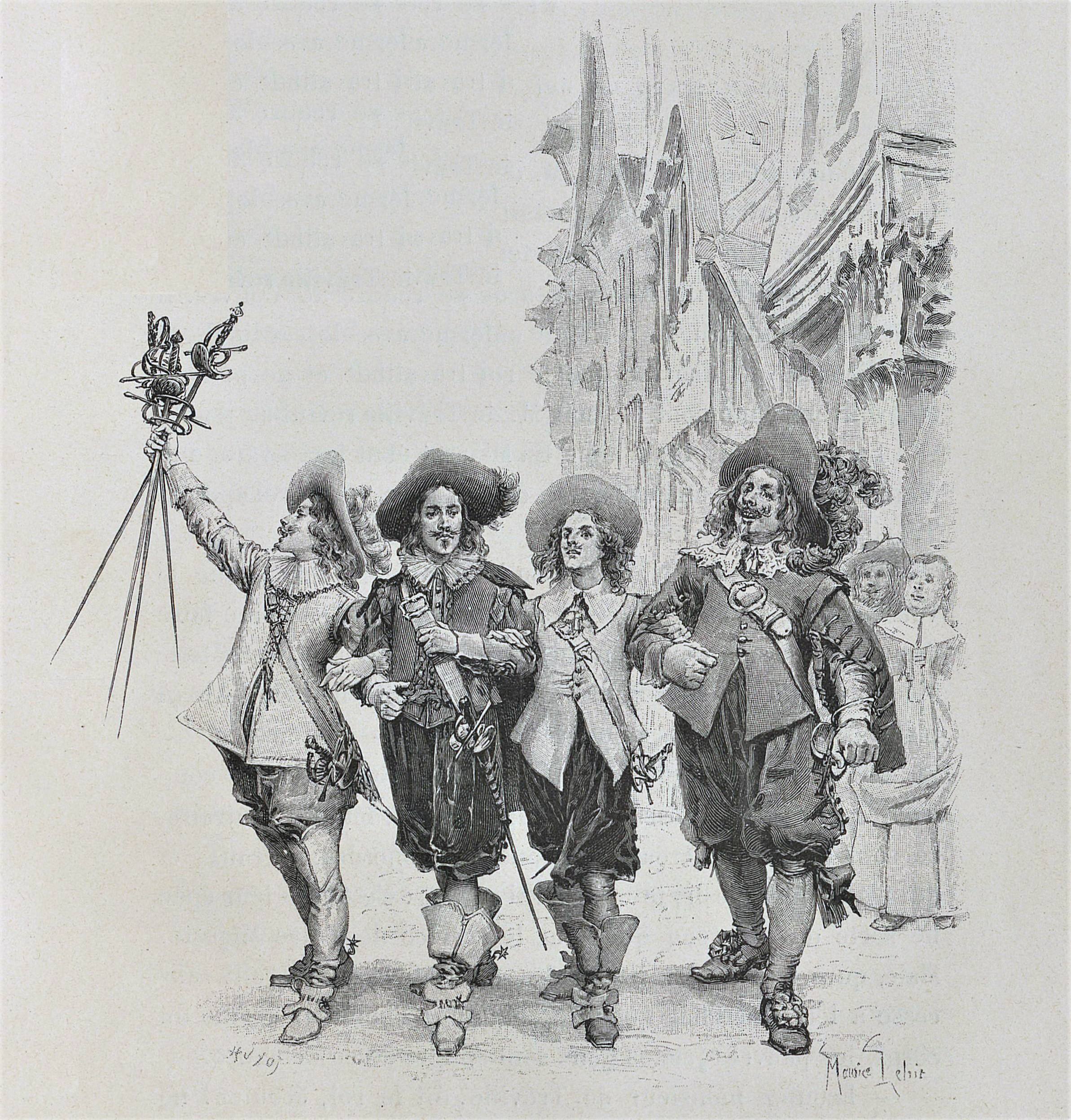
- D'Artagnan, Athos, Aramis, and Porthos (1894)
- Author: Alexandre Dumas in collaboration with Auguste Maquet
- Original title: Les Trois Mousquetaires
- Language: French
- Genre: Historical novel, adventure novel, swashbuckler
- Publication date: March–July 1844 (serialised), July 1844 (book form)
- Publication place: France
- Pages: c. 700 (depending on the edition)
- Followed by: The Count of Moret, The Dove, Twenty Years After

Les Trois Mousquetaires, by Alexandre Dumas, in French. LibriVox recording by Jc Guan. Chapter 1. Les trois présents de M. d'Artagnan père.

The Three Musketeers (French: Les Trois Mousquetaires) is a French historical adventure novel written and published in 1844 by French author Alexandre Dumas. It is the first of the author's three d'Artagnan Romances. As with some of his other works, he wrote it in collaboration with ghostwriter Auguste Maquet. It is in the swashbuckler genre, which has heroic, chivalrous swordsmen who fight for justice.

Set between 1625 and 1628, it recounts the adventures of a young man named d'Artagnan (a character loosely based on the soldier Charles de Batz-Castelmore d'Artagnan) after he leaves home to travel to Paris, hoping to join the Musketeers of the Guard. Although d'Artagnan is not able to join this elite corps immediately, he is befriended by three of the most formidable musketeers of the age – Athos, Porthos, and Aramis: "the three musketeers" or "the three inseparables" – and becomes involved in affairs of state and at court.

The Three Musketeers is primarily a historical and adventure novel. However, Dumas frequently portrays various injustices, abuses and absurdities of the Ancien Régime, giving the novel an additional political significance at the time of its publication, a time when the debate in France between republicans and monarchists was still fierce. The story was first serialised from March to July 1844, during the July Monarchy, four years before the French Revolution of 1848 established the Second Republic.

The story of d'Artagnan is continued in Twenty Years After and The Vicomte of Bragelonne: Ten Years Later.

== Origin ==
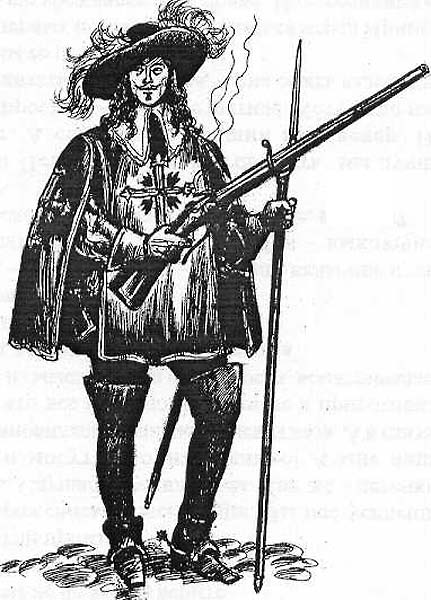
A Musketeer of the Guard c. 1660.

Dumas presents his novel as one of a series of recovered manuscripts, turning the origins of his romance into a little drama of its own. In the preface, he tells of being inspired by a scene in Mémoires de Monsieur d'Artagnan (1700), a historical novel by Gatien de Courtilz de Sandras, printed by Pierre Rouge in Amsterdam, which Dumas discovered during his research for his history of Louis XIV. According to Dumas, the incident where d'Artagnan tells of his first visit to M. de Tréville, captain of the Musketeers, and how, in the antechamber, he encountered three young Béarnese with the names Athos, Porthos and Aramis, made such an impression on him that he continued to investigate.

Dumas's account is true up to this point, but is fictionalised from then on, relating how he finally found the names of the three musketeers in a manuscript titled Mémoire de M. le comte de la Fère, etc. Dumas "requested permission" to reprint the manuscript; which was granted:

Now, this is the first part of this precious manuscript which we offer to our readers, restoring it to the title which belongs to it, and entering into an engagement that if (of which we have no doubt) this first part should obtain the success it merits, we will publish the second immediately.

In the meanwhile, since godfathers are second fathers, as it were, we beg the reader to lay to our account and not to that of the Comte de la Fère, the pleasure or the ennui he may experience.

This being understood, let us proceed with our story.

The Three Musketeers was written in collaboration with Auguste Maquet, who also worked with Dumas on its sequels (Twenty Years After and The Vicomte of Bragelonne: Ten Years Later), as well as The Count of Monte Cristo. Maquet would suggest plot outlines after doing historical research; Dumas then expanded the plot, removing some characters, including new ones and imbuing the story with his unmistakable style.

The Three Musketeers was first published in serial form in the newspaper Le Siècle between March and July 1844.

== Plot ==
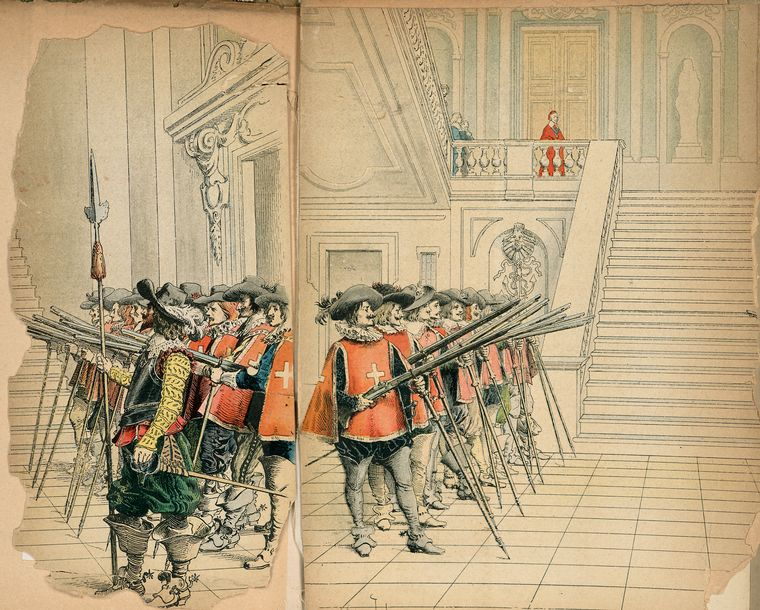
Depiction of the Cardinal's musketeers, the great rivals of the King's musketeers

In 1625 France, D'Artagnan leaves his family in Gascony and travels to Paris to join the Musketeers of the Guard. At a house in Meung-sur-Loire, an older man derides D'Artagnan's horse. Insulted, D'Artagnan demands a duel. The older man's companions instead beat D'Artagnan unconscious with a cooking pot and a tong that breaks his sword. His letter of introduction to Monsieur de Tréville, the commander of the Musketeers, a King's elite regiment, is stolen. D'Artagnan resolves to avenge himself upon the older man, who is actually the Comte de Rochefort, an agent of Cardinal Richelieu, who is passing the latter's orders to his spy, Milady de Winter.

In Paris, D'Artagnan visits Tréville at the Musketeers' headquarters. Without the letter, he faces a lukewarm reception from Tréville. Before their conversation concludes, D'Artagnan sees Rochefort passing in the street through Tréville's window and rushes out of the building to confront him. Pursuing Rochefort, he separately offends three musketeers, Athos, Porthos and Aramis, who each demand satisfaction; D'Artagnan must fight a duel with each of them that afternoon.

As D'Artagnan prepares himself for the first duel, he realizes that Athos's seconds are Porthos and Aramis, who are astonished that the Gascon intends to duel them all. As D'Artagnan and Athos begin, Richelieu's guards appear and attempt to arrest the musketeers for illegal dueling. Offered to leave by the Cardinal's guards, D'Artagnan decides to help the musketeers. Despite being outnumbered four to five, the four men win the battle. D'Artagnan seriously wounds Jussac, one of Richelieu's officers and a renowned fighter. King Louis XIII appoints D'Artagnan to Des Essart's company of the King's Guards, a less prestigious regiment, and gives him forty pistoles.

D'Artagnan hires a servant named Planchet and finds lodgings with Bonacieux, a merchant. His landlord later mentions the kidnapping of his wife, Constance Bonacieux, who works for Queen Anne of France. When she is released, D'Artagnan falls in love at first sight with her. Queen Anne secretly meets the Duke of Buckingham, England's first minister. At the meeting, she gives him a diamond necklace, the King's gift to her, as a keepsake.

Richelieu, who wants to diminish the influence of Queen Anne and her Spanish entourage on French internal affairs, plots to persuade the King that his wife is having an affair with Buckingham. On his advice, the King demands that the Queen wear the diamonds to an upcoming soirée. Constance tries to send her husband to London to fetch the diamonds, but he is instead manipulated by Richelieu and thus does not go, so D'Artagnan and his friends intercede. En route to England, Richelieu's henchmen attack them—Porthos is compelled to fight a duel and is badly wounded, Aramis is shot in an ambush, and Athos is falsely accused of forging money and detained at an inn. Only D'Artagnan and Planchet reach London. Before arriving, D'Artagnan is compelled to assault and nearly kill the Comte de Wardes, a friend of Richelieu, cousin of Rochefort and Milady's love interest. Although Milady stole two of the diamond studs, Buckingham provides replacements while delaying the thief's return to Paris. D'Artagnan thus returns a complete set of jewels to Queen Anne in time to save her honor.

D'Artagnan hopes to begin an affair with the grateful Constance. She writes him a letter asking her to meet him in private, but when he arrives, he sees signs of a struggle and discovers that Rochefort and Bonacieux, acting under the orders of Richelieu, have kidnapped Constance again. D'Artagnan traces his steps back to find his friends whom he abandoned on his way to London. At their meeting, Athos, drunk, tells D'Artagnan a story about a count who fell in love with and married a young woman. Months later, the count discovered that his wife was branded with a fleur-de-lis on her shoulder, a punishment for felony. The count left her to die in a forest with her hands tied, abandoned his family castle and joined the King's guard under another name. D'Artagnan understands that Athos is telling his own story.

In Paris, D'Artagnan meets Milady and recognizes her as one of Richelieu's agents. Nevertheless, he becomes infatuated with her, forgetting Constance, though Milady's maid, Kitty, reveals that Milady is indifferent towards him. Entering her quarters in the dark, D'Artagnan pretends to be Comte de Wardes, whom she invited in a letter that D'Artagnan had intercepted. During this encounter D'Artagnan learns several of Milady's secrets, before exiting her chamber. In a later encounter with D'Artagnan, this time in his own guise, Milady tries to seduce D'Artagnan into killing de Wardes for her. Later D'Artagnan reveals to Milady his earlier deceit, which shocks Milady and leads to a scuffle; the shoulder of her dress is torn, leading to D'Artagnan discovering the fleur-de-lis brand. Milady attempts to kill D'Artagnan, who eludes her. He later tells Athos that his former wife is alive.

Cardinal Richelieu offers D'Artagnan a career in his guards' ranks. Dreading the prospect of losing his friends, D'Artagnan refuses despite understanding that his career prospects diminish as a result. With their regiments, D'Artagnan and the three musketeers are ordered to the Siege of La Rochelle. There, the four friends survive two assassination attempts by Milady's agents. The would-be assassins die in the process.

At an inn, Athos overhears Richelieu asking Milady to murder Buckingham, whose support is critical to the Protestant rebels at La Rochelle. Richelieu gives her his order absolving the bearer from any responsibility, but Athos takes the order from her. To get time to secretly consult with his friends, Athos bets that he, D'Artagnan, Porthos, and Aramis will hold the recaptured St. Gervais bastion against the rebels for an hour next morning. They resist for an hour and a half before retreating, killing a dozen Rochelaise in the process, which adds to their legend. They warn the Queen and Lord de Winter about Milady's plan to assassinate Buckingham. Milady is imprisoned on arrival in England, but seduces her puritan guard, Felton, (Note: A fictionalization of John Felton, Buckingham's assassin) and persuades him to allow her to escape and to kill Buckingham himself.

D'Artagnan is informed that the Queen has rescued Constance from prison. He gets a permission to take her from a convent where the Queen sent her to hide.

Upon her return to France, Milady hides, coincidentally, in the convent where Constance is hiding. The naïve Constance clings to Milady who pretends to be another victim of the Cardinal's intrigues. Seeking revenge on D'Artagnan, Milady poisons Constance before he arrives to rescue her. The musketeers catch Milady before she reaches Richelieu. Summoning a local executioner, they put Milady on trial, sentence her to death, and have her executed. The executioner reveals that it was he who branded Milady as a felon years before after she, a young nun at the time, seduced and then abandoned his brother, a local priest.

When the four friends return to the Siege of La Rochelle, Richelieu's Guards arrest D’Artagnan. D'Artagnan gives the Cardinal the secret order absolving the bearer of any responsibility which Athos had taken from Milady. Impressed with D'Artagnan's candor and secretly glad to be rid of Milady upon hearing of her past crimes, Richelieu destroys the order and writes a new one, giving the bearer a promotion to lieutenant in Tréville's company, leaving the name blank. D'Artagnan offers the letter to his three friends in turn, but each refuses it; Athos because it is beneath him, Porthos because he is retiring to marry his wealthy mistress, and Aramis because he is joining the priesthood. D'Artagnan, though heartbroken and full of regrets, receives the promotion he had coveted.

== Characters ==
Musketeers

- D'Artagnan – Charles de Batz de Castelmore D'Artagnan: an impetuous, brave and clever young man seeking to become a musketeer in France.
- Athos – Comte de la Fère: he has never recovered from his marriage to Milady and seeks solace in wine. As the oldest of the friend group, he becomes a father figure to d'Artagnan.
- Porthos – Seigneur du Vallon: a dandy, fond of fashionable clothes and keen to make a fortune for himself. The least cerebral of the quartet, he compensates with his homeric strength of body and character.
- Aramis – René d'Herblay, a handsome young man who wavers between his religious calling and his fondness for women and court intrigue.

Musketeers' servants

- Planchet – a young man from Picardy, he is seen by Porthos on the Pont de la Tournelle spitting into the river below. Porthos takes this as a sign of good character and hires him on the spot to serve d'Artagnan. He turns out to be a brave, intelligent and loyal servant.
- Grimaud – a Breton, whom Athos, a strict master, only permits to speak in emergencies; he mostly communicates through sign language.
- Mousqueton – originally a Norman named Boniface; Porthos, however, changes his name to one that sounds better. He is a would-be dandy, just as vain as his master. In lieu of pay, he is clothed and lodged in a manner superior to that usual for servants, dressing grandly in his master's renovated old clothing.
- Bazin – from the province of Berry, Bazin is a pious man who waits for the day his master (Aramis) will join the church, as he has always dreamed of serving a churchman.

Others

- Anne de Breuil, Milady de Winter – a beautiful and evil spy of the Cardinal, she is also Athos's ex-wife. She is a widow of Lord de Winter's brother. (Unbeknownst to everyone, this marriage is illegal as Athos is alive.) D'Artagnan impersonates a rival to spend a night with her, attracting her deadly hatred when the deceit is revealed.
- Rochefort – a more conventional agent of the Cardinal. Following their meeting at Meung on the road to Paris, d'Artagnan swears to have his revenge. He misses several opportunities, but their paths finally cross again towards the end of the novel.
- Constance Bonacieux – the queen's seamstress and confidante. After d'Artagnan rescues her from the Cardinal's Guard, he immediately falls in love with her. She appreciates his protection, but the relationship is never consummated.
- Monsieur Bonacieux – Constance's husband. He initially enlists d'Artagnan's help to rescue his wife from the Cardinal's Guards, but when he himself is arrested, Richelieu turns Monsieur Bonacieux against his wife, and he goes on to play a role in her abduction.
- Kitty – a young servant of Milady de Winter. She dislikes her mistress and deeply adores d'Artagnan.
- Lord de Winter – brother of Milady's second husband who died of a mysterious disease (apparently poisoned by Milady). Acting on a warning from d'Artagnan, he imprisons Milady upon her arrival in England and plans to send her overseas in exile. Later, he takes part in Milady's trial.

Historical characters

- King Louis XIII – presented by Dumas as a fairly weak and self-indulgent monarch, often manipulated by his chief minister.
- Queen Anne of Austria – the queen of France, described as naive and uninterested in the affairs of state, neglected by her husband and persecuted by the Cardinal for the mix of political and personal reasons.
- Cardinal Richelieu – Armand Jean du Plessis, the king's chief minister, focused on strengthening the monarchy and the French national state. At the same time, he resents the queen for rebuffing his advances.
- M. de Tréville – captain of the Musketeers, courtier and a childhood friend of the King. Treville is a mentor, a confidant, and occasionally a protector to the three musketeers and d'Artagnan.
- George Villiers, 1st Duke of Buckingham – a handsome and charismatic favorite of the King of England used to getting his way; he thinks nothing of starting a war between England and France for his personal convenience. His courtship of Anne of Austria places her in great peril.
- John Felton – a Puritan officer assigned by Lord de Winter to guard Milady and warned about her ways, he is nonetheless seduced by her in a matter of days and assassinates Buckingham at her request.

== Translations into English ==
Les Trois Mousquetaires was translated into three English versions by 1846. One of these, by William Barrow (1817–1877), is still in print and fairly faithful to the original, available in the Oxford World's Classics 1999 edition. To conform to 19th-century English standards, all of the explicit and many of the implicit references to sexuality were removed, adversely affecting the readability of several scenes, such as the scenes between d'Artagnan and Milady.

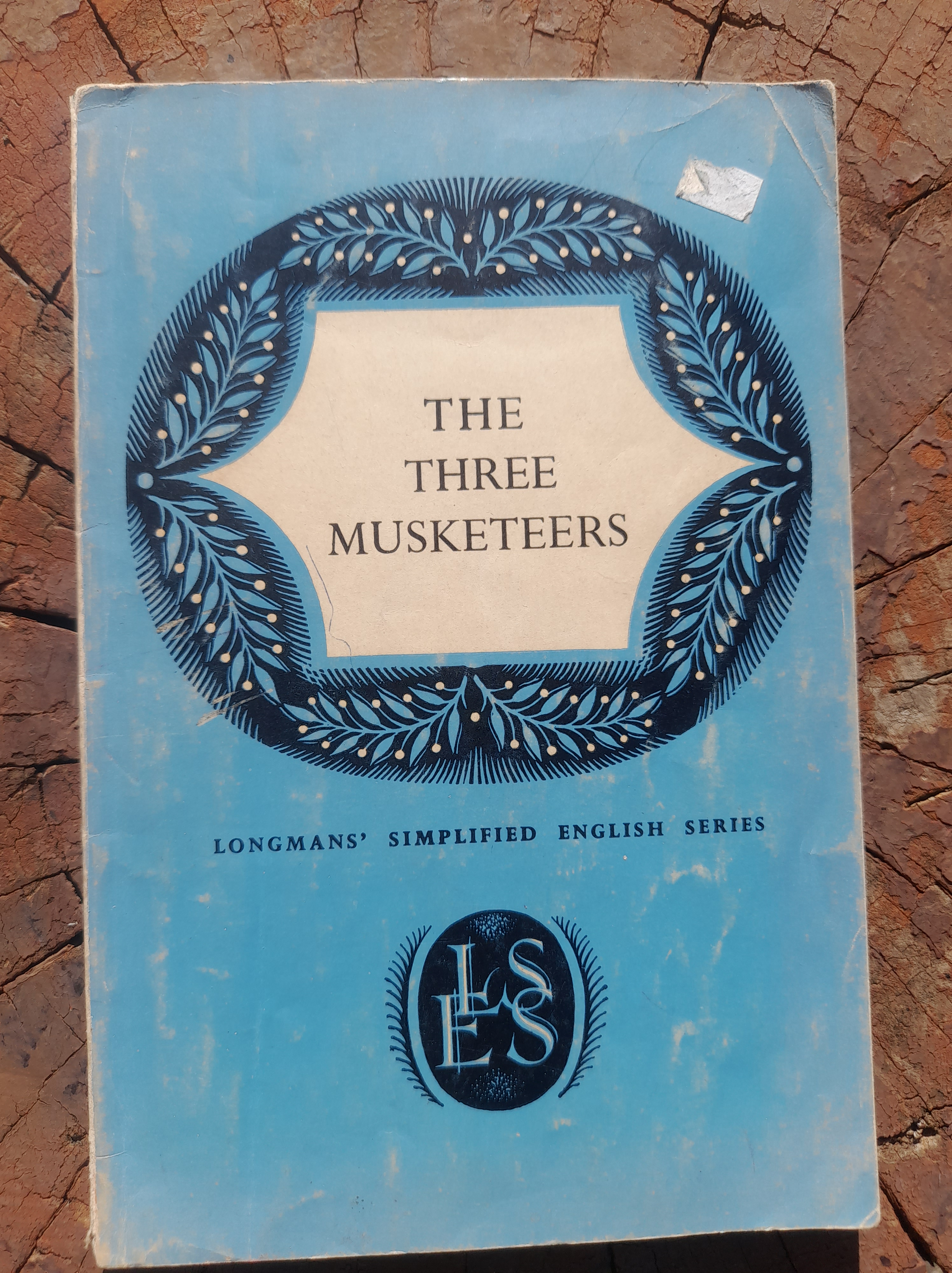
The Three Musketeers Longmans' Simplified English Series 1960

In 1960 Manfred E.Graham adapted the book for the Longman's Simplified English Series.

There are 3 modern translations as well. One recent English translation is by Will Hobson in 2002.

Another is by Richard Pevear (2006), who, though applauding Barrow's work, states that most of the modern translations available today are "textbook examples of bad translation practices" which "give their readers an extremely distorted notion of Dumas' writing."

The most recent translation is by the American translator Lawrence Ellsworth (Lawrence Schick) published by Pegasus Books in February 2018 from the 1956 French edition.

Ellsworth decided to translate the full trilogy of The d'Artagnan Romances as well as the two novels of The Count of Moret for 21st century readers in nine volumes, making it the first complete translation in over a century and a half. As of 2025 all nine volumes have been published.

== Adaptations ==
=== Film ===
- The Three Musketeers (1921), a silent film adaptation starring Douglas Fairbanks.
- The Three Musketeers (1939), a musical comedy adaptation starring Don Ameche and The Ritz Brothers.
- The Three Musketeers (1948), a 1948 adaptation starring Van Heflin, Lana Turner, June Allyson, Angela Lansbury, Vincent Price, and Gene Kelly.
- The Three Musketeers (1973) and The Four Musketeers (1974), a two-part adaptation directed by Richard Lester, starring Oliver Reed, Frank Finlay, Richard Chamberlain and Michael York.
- D'Artagnan and Three Musketeers (1978), a popular Soviet musical featuring Mikhail Boyarsky
- The Three Musketeers (1993), a 1993 Disney adaptation starring Charlie Sheen, Kiefer Sutherland, Oliver Platt and Chris O'Donnell.
- The Musketeer, a 2001 film.
- Three Musketeers (2004 musical), a musical adaptation in which Volodymyr Zelenskyy played d'Artagnan, and the three musketeers were gender-flipped to be women
- The Three Musketeers (2011), directed by Paul W. S. Anderson and starring Luke Evans, Ray Stevenson and Milla Jovovich.
- The Three Musketeers: D'Artagnan and The Three Musketeers: Milady, a 2023 two-part French adventure film saga starring François Civil, Vincent Cassel, Pio Marmaï, Romain Duris and Eva Green

=== Television ===
The novel has also been adapted for television in live action and animation.

==== Live action ====
The BBC has adapted the novel on three occasions:

- The Three Musketeers, a 1954 BBC adaptation in six 30-minute episodes, starring Laurence Payne, Roger Delgado, Paul Whitsun-Jones and Paul Hansard
- The Three Musketeers, a 1966 BBC adaptation in ten 25-minute episodes, directed by Peter Hammond and starring Jeremy Brett, Jeremy Young and Brian Blessed
- The Musketeers, a 2014 series by Adrian Hodges, is the newest BBC adaptation starring Tom Burke, Santiago Cabrera, Howard Charles and Luke Pasqualino as the titular musketeers.

La Femme Musketeer is a derivative 2004 television movie by the Hallmark Channel, focusing on the daughter of the renamed Jacques d’Artagnan (Michael York), also starring Gérard Depardieu.

Young Blades is an American/Canadian television series that aired on PAX in 2005. The series serves as a sequel to the novels, centered on the son of d'Artagnan, played by Tobias Mehler.

A series adapted for Korean history aired in 2014.

==== Animation ====
Walt Disney Productions produced a Silly Symphony cartoon in 1936 called, Three Blind Mouseketeers, which is loosely based on both the novel and the nursery rhyme "Three Blind Mice", in which the characters are depicted as anthropomorphic animals.

A two-part adaptation aired on The Famous Adventures of Mr. Magoo, with Magoo portraying D'Artagnan.

The Three Musketeers was a series of animated shorts produced by Hanna-Barbera as part of The Banana Splits Comedy-Adventure Hour and The Banana Splits & Friends show.

The Three Musketeers was a Hanna-Barbera animated special from 1973. It was part of the 1970s-80s CBS anthology series Famous Classic Tales that was produced by Hanna-Barbera's Australian division and often aired around the holidays between Thanksgiving and New Year's Day.

Dogtanian and the Three Muskehounds is a 1981 Spanish–Japanese anime adaptation, where the characters are anthropomorphic dogs. A sequel, The Return of Dogtanian, was released in 1989 by BRB Internacional, Thames Television and Wang Film Productions. Set 10 years after the original, it is loosely based on the novel The Vicomte de Bragelonne. A key difference between the two Dogtanian adaptions and Dumas' novel is that the character traits of Athos and Porthos were interchanged, making Athos the extrovert and Porthos the secretive noble of the group.

In 1989, Gakken produced a new anime adaptation called The Three Musketeers Anime, this time with human characters, which features several departures from the original.

Albert the Fifth Musketeer is a 1994 French-British animated series featuring a new musketeer, the titular Albert.

Mickey, Donald, Goofy: The Three Musketeers, a direct-to-video animated movie produced by Walt Disney Pictures and the Australian office of DisneyToon Studios, directed by Donovan Cook and released on 17 August 2004.

The Backyardigans had a 2009 episode in its third season by the name of The Two Musketeers; a third musketeer joins by the end of the episode.

A Barbie adaptation of the tale by the name of Barbie and the Three Musketeers was released in 2009.

A new CGI children's animated series The 3 Musketeers will be focus on a female-lead version rather than the regular male lead which will be produced by Mediawan's French animation company Method Animation and Italian production company Palomar. Mediawan previously produced the live action two-part film saga under their film production company Chapter 2.

=== Stage ===
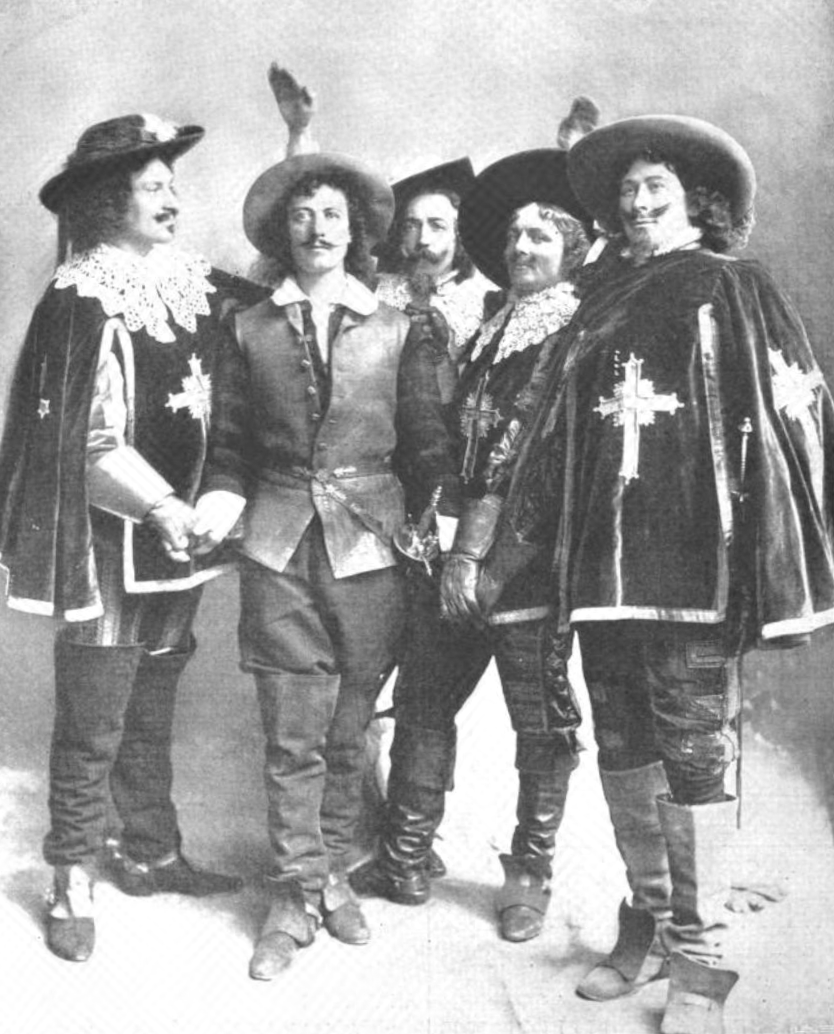
1898 production at the Theatre Metropole

The first stage production was in Dumas' own lifetime as the opera Les Trois Mousquetaires with a libretto by Dumas himself and music by Albert Visetti.

An 1898 play, by Henry Hamilton, opened as The Three Musketeers at the Theatre Metropole, Camberwell, England, on 12 September 1898. Renamed The King's Musketeer, it was mounted at the Knickerbocker Theatre in New York on 22 February 1899.

The Three Musketeers is a musical with a book by William Anthony McGuire, lyrics by Clifford Grey and P. G. Wodehouse, and music by Rudolf Friml. The original 1928 production ran on Broadway for 318 performances. A 1984 revival ran for 15 previews and 9 performances.

The Stratford Festival has staged different theatrical productions of playwright Peter Raby's adaptation of the novel:

- In 1968, Raby collaborated with composer Raymond Pannell on a production at the Festival Theatre in 1968 directed by John Hirsch, with Powys Thomas as Athos, James Blendick as Porthos, Christopher Newton as Aramis and Douglas Rain as d'Artagnan.
- In 1988, a production was staged at the Festival Theatre with music by Alan Laing and directed by Richard Ouzounian, with Colm Feore as Athos, Stephen Russell as Porthos, Lorne Kennedy as Aramis and Geraint Wyn Davies as d'Artagnan.
- In 2000, a production was staged at the Festival Theatre with music by Berthold Carriere and directed by Richard Monette and Paul Leishman, with Benedict Campbell as Athos, Thom Marriott as Porthos, Andy Velasquez as Aramis and Timothy Askew as d'Artagnan.
- In 2013, a production was staged at the Festival Theatre with music by Lesley Arden and directed by Miles Potter, with Graham Abbey as Athos, Jonathan Goad as Porthos, Mike Shara as Aramis and Luke Humphrey as d'Artagnan.

In 2003, a Dutch musical 3 Musketiers with a book by André Breedland and music & lyrics by Rob & Ferdi Bolland premiered, which went on to open in Germany (both the Dutch and German production starring Pia Douwes as Milady De Winter) and Hungary.

Playwright Peter Raby, composer George Stiles and lyricist Paul Leigh have written another adaptation titled The 3 Musketeers, One Musical For All, originally produced by the now defunct American Musical Theatre of San Jose.

In 2006, an adaptation by Ken Ludwig premiered at the Bristol Old Vic. In this version, d'Artagnan's sister Sabine, "the quintessential tomboy," poses as a young man and participates in her brother's adventures.

In September 2016, a new French musical interpretation produced by Nicole and Gilbert Coullier, Roberto Ciurleo, Eléonore de Galard and NRJ Group entitled The Three Musketeers: One For All, All For One! toured until February 2017. Featuring contemporary music, it starred Canadian pop singer Olivier Dion as d'Artagnan, French pop singer and stage actor Damien Sargue as Aramis, French dancer and choreographer Brahim Zaibat as Athos (also part of the artistic direction), and French actor David Bàn as Porthos.

In 2018, The Dukes performed an outdoor promenade production in Williamson Park, Lancaster, adapted by Hattie Naylor: in this version d'Artagnan was a young woman aspiring to be a musketeer.

The Royal Shakespeare Company and Told by an Idiot will present a new adaptation which will run at the Royal Shakespeare Theatre, Stratford-upon-Avon from 28 November 2026 to 8 January 2027.

=== Video games and board games ===
In 1995, publisher U.S. Gold released Touché: The Adventures of the Fifth Musketeer by video game developers Clipper Software, a classic point-and-click adventure game. In 2005, Swedish developer Legendo Entertainment published the side-scrolling platform game The Three Musketeers for Windows XP and Windows Vista. In July 2009, a version of the game was released for WiiWare in North America and Europe under the title The Three Musketeers: One for All!. In 2009, Canadian developer Dingo Games self-published The Three Musketeers: The Game for Windows and Mac OS X. It is the first game to be truly based on the novel (in that it closely follows the novel's story). 2009 also saw the publication of the asymmetric team board game The Three Musketeers "The Queen's Pendants" (Настольная игра "Три мушкетера") from French designer Pascal Bernard by the Russian publisher Zvezda. In 2010, a co-operative game called "Mousquetaires du Roy" was released by Ystari and Rio Grande. The alternative spelling of "Roy" was taken from the old French and is rumoured to be preferred over the regular spelling because the publishers desire to have a letter "Y" in the name of the games they publish. Designed by François Combe and Gilles Lehmann for 1-5 players, the medium heavy game depicts the quest to retrieve the Queen's diamonds, while at the same time fending off disasters back in Paris. A sixth player expansion, called "Treville" was also made available in 2010.

In 2010, Anuman Interactive launched The Three Musketeers, a hidden object game on PC and MAC. Players follow d'Artagnan in his quest to become a king's musketeer.

=== Web series ===
In 2016, KindaTV launched a web series based on the story of The Three Musketeers, called "All For One". It follows a group of college students, mainly Dorothy Castlemore and is centred around a sorority- Mu Sigma Theta (MST). The majority of characters have been gender-swapped from the original story and most character names are based on the original characters.

It covers several themes including the LGBT community, mental health, long-distance relationships and college life.

=== Audio ===
A musical version with music by Rudolf Friml, book by William Anthony McGuire, lyrics by Clifford Grey and directed by Alastair Scott Johnston was broadcast on BBC Radio 2 on 21 March 1970.

An adaptation in twelve parts by Patrick Riddell was broadcast on the BBC Light Programme 4 April-20 June 1946. The cast included Marius Goring as d'Artagnan, Philip Cunningham as Athos, Howard Marion-Crawford as Porthos, Allan McClelland as Aramis, Lucille Lisle as Milady de Winter, Leon Quartermaine as Cardinal Richelieu and Valentine Dyall as the Narrator.

In the early 1960s, United Artists Records released an audio dramatization of the first half of The Three Musketeers (UAC 11007) (dealing with the affair of the Queen's Diamonds) as part of their Tale Spinners for Children series, starring Robert Hardy as d'Artagnan and John Wood as Cardinal Richelieu.

Michael York was the narrator for a 1982 Caedmon Records LP recording (TC 1692) consisting of the first five chapters of the novel. Since then, the novel has been released in audiobook format many times.

An adaptation in six parts by James Saunders directed by Martin Jenkins was broadcast on BBC Radio 4 28 April-2 June 1994. The cast included Jamie Glover as d'Artgagnan, Robert Glenister as Athos, Timothy Spall as Porthos, Anton Lesser as Aramis, Imelda Staunton as Milady de Winter, Michael Cochrane as the Duke of Buckingham and Julian Glover as Cardinal Richelieu. This adaptation was rebroadcast on BBC Radio 4 in 1995, on BBC Radio 7 in 2010 and on BBC Radio 4 Extra in 2014.

In September 2019, Amazon released The Three Musketeers: an Audible Original Audio Drama, which follows the story of the book told from Milady's perspective.

In April 2021, Durham University Audio Society began releasing the first season of DUADS' The Three Musketeers. The show originally aired on Durham University's student radio station, Purple Radio, and went on to be nominated for and receive several local awards. The show remains faithful to the events of the novel, but adds in several adventures and touches on additional themes, including LGBT themes. The first season covers the first arc of the book, the quest for the Queen's diamond studs. A second and third season are in the works.

In May 2022, Radio Mirchi Kolkata station aired The Three Musketeers in Bangla version, translated by Rajarshee Gupta for Mirchi's Sunday Suspense Programme. It was narrated by Deepanjan Ghosh. D'Artagnan was voiced by actor Rwitobroto Mukherjee. Athos was voiced by Gaurav Chakrabarty, Porthos by Agni, Aramis by Somak, King Louis XIII by Sayak Aman and Cardinal Richelieu by Mir Afsar Ali.

=== Other ===
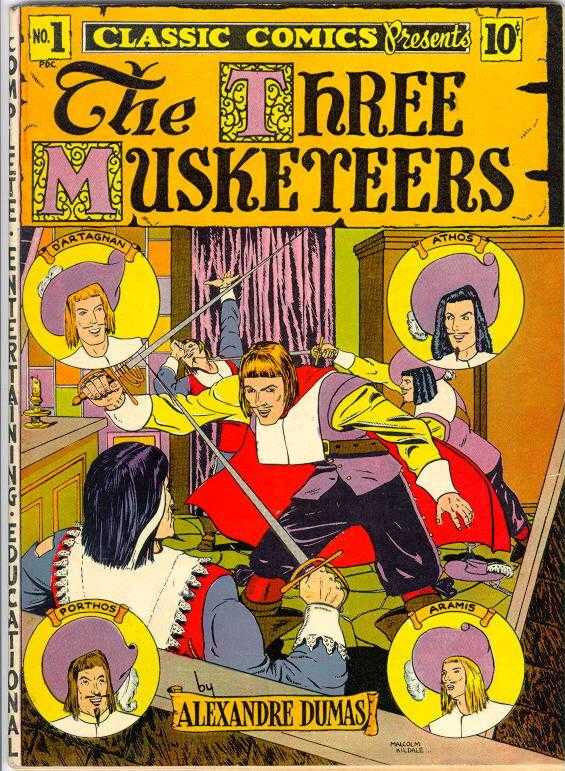
Three Musketeers, Issue No. 1, Classic Comics, published 1941

Publisher Albert Lewis Kanter (1897–1973), created Classic Comics for Elliot Publishing Company in 1941 with its debut issues being The Three Musketeers. The Three Mouseketeers was the title of two series produced by DC Comics; the first series was a loose parody of The Three Musketeers. It was also made into motion comics in the Video Comic Book series.

In 1939, American author Tiffany Thayer published a book titled Three Musketeers (Thayer, 1939). This is a re-telling of the story in Thayer's words, true to the original plot but told in a different order and with different points of view and emphasis from the original.

Fantasy novelist Steven Brust's Khaavren Romances series have all used Dumas novels (particularly the D'Artagnan Romances) as their chief inspiration, recasting the plots of those novels to fit within Brust's established world of Dragaera. His 2020 novel The Baron of Magister Valley follows suit, using The Count of Monte Cristo as a starting point.

Sarah Hoyt's (nom de plume Sarah D'Almeida) Musketeers series begins with Death of a Musketeer, a Mystery Book Club selection, and includes four other titles from Berkley Prime Crime and Goldport Press.

Tansy Rayner Roberts wrote Musketeer Space, a space opera retelling of the original book in which almost all characters have a different gender, as a weekly serialized novel from 2014 to 2016.

== In popular culture ==
=== Literature ===
The American translator Lawrence Ellsworth is currently translating The d'Artagnan Romances in its entirety, and he has also written a 2-volume novel called The Rose Knight's Crucifixion that is a parallel novel to The Three Musketeers, in which most of the characters from The Three Musketeers and Sir Percy Blakeney from the Laughing Cavalier and The First Sir Percy by Baroness Orczy appear. The protagonist's physical appearance, however, is based on Quasimodo from Victor Hugo's The Hunchback of Notre-Dame.

In the book The Assault, The Three Musketeers is quoted in the prologue as the protagonist had the story read to him by Mr. Beumer, a lawyer who later becomes senile and in morbidity.

In the manga My Hero Academia, the phrases "All for One" and "One for All" are used to refer to two of the most powerful superpowers, called Quirks, in the series.

=== Film and television ===
In Slumdog Millionaire, Jamal Malik's final question was to correctly identify the name of the third musketeer— which was Aramis. Jamal did so and won twenty million rupees. This question proved vital since Jamal only knew the names of the first two musketeers.

In the film Django Unchained, one of the slaves, owned by Calvin Candie, is named D'Artagnan.

The 1998 film The Man in the Iron Mask depicts the (older) four musketeers as they navigate a plot alongside King Louis XIV. They feature as key characters yet stray from the plot of 'The Three Musketeers'.

In Dinosaur King the second season has an arc based on the story.

=== Video games ===
In Pokémon Black and White, the Pokémon Cobalion, Terrakion and Virizion, known as the Swords of Justice, are based on the Three Musketeers. Cobalion represents Athos, Terrakion represents Porthos and Virizion represents Aramis. The fourth Sword of Justice, Keldeo, represents d'Artagnan.

=== Music ===
The Smiths song "You've Got Everything Now" features the line: "I've seen you smile, but I've never really heard you laugh" and is borrowed from a narrative description of Athos:

He was very taciturn, this worthy signor. Be it understood we are speaking of Athos. During the five or six years that he had lived in the strictest intimacy with his companions, Porthos and Aramis, they could remember having often seen him smile, but had never heard him laugh.

— Chapter 7, The Interior of the Musketeers

== Use as a cypher ==
Eli Cohen, the Israeli spy who for several years infiltrated the Syrian government until discovered by the Syrian intelligence and executed, used for his communications with Israel a book cypher based on a French-language copy of The Three Musketeers. Another copy, in the Mossad headquarters in Tel Aviv, was used to decode Cohen's messages; that copy is now preserved in the Mossad's museum.
