= The Viscount of Bragelonne/Between Two Kings =

1850 novel by Alexandre Dumas

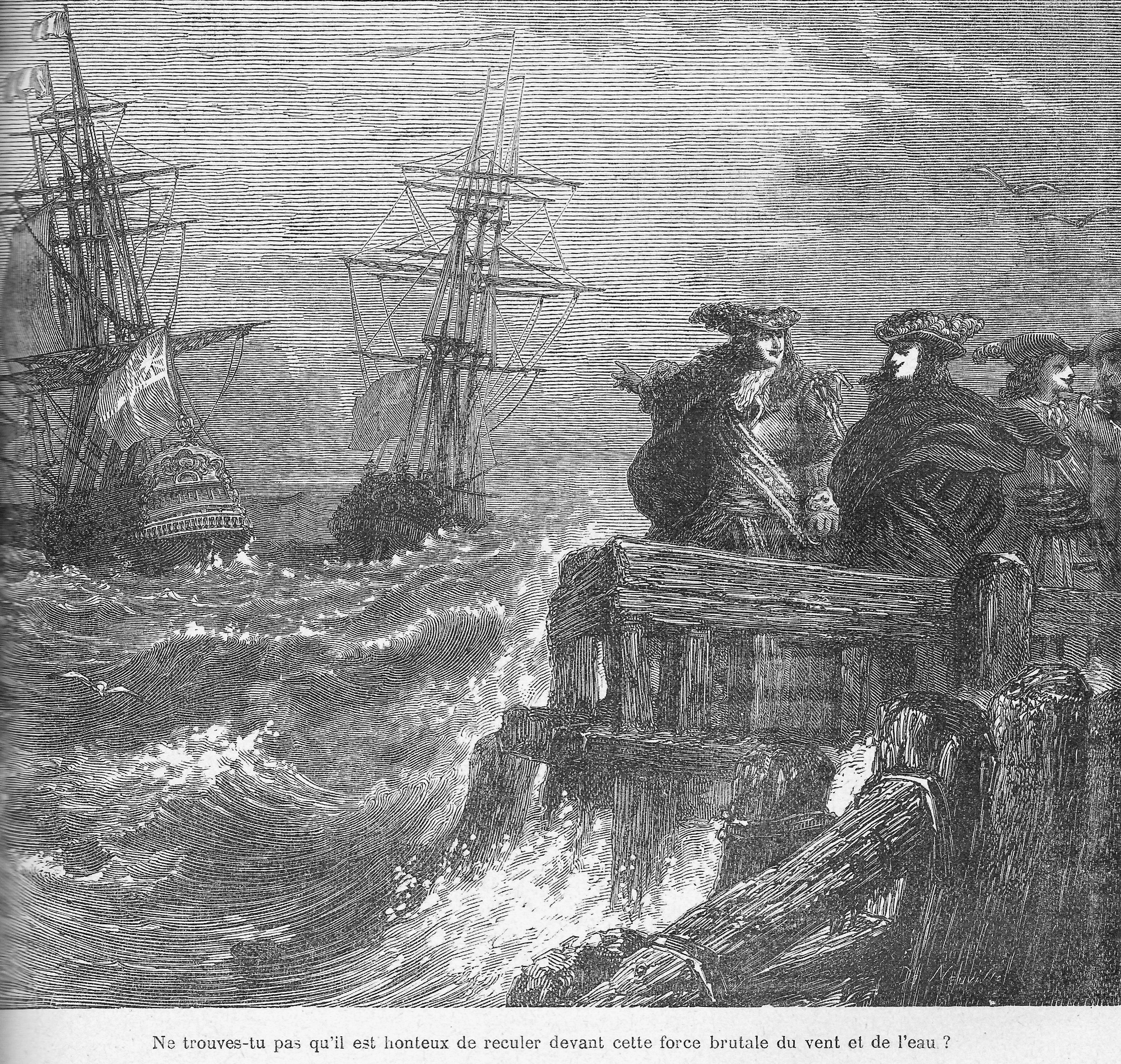
- Engraving illustrating an old edition of the Vicomte de Bragelonne
- Author: Alexandre Dumas in collaboration with Auguste Maquet
- Original title: Le Vicomte de Bragelonne ou Dix ans plus tard
- Language: Translated from French
- Genre: Historical, Romantic
- Publication date: French, serialized 1847–1850
- Publication place: France
- Preceded by: Twenty Years After

The Viscount of Bragelonne/Between Two Kings or The Vicomte of Bragelonne: Ten Years Later (French: Le Vicomte de Bragelonne ou Dix ans plus tard [lə vikɔ̃t də bʁaʒəlɔn u diz‿ɑ̃ ply taʁ]), or also just known as Between Two Kings, is a novel by Alexandre Dumas. It is the third and last of The d'Artagnan Romances, following The Three Musketeers and Twenty Years After. It appeared first in serial form between 1847 and 1850.

== Premise ==
Set in the 1660s and concerned with the early reign of Louis XIV, the novel has been called an origins story of the King, "a tale about the education of a young man who went on to rule for over 70 years". Naturally, in a novel about Dumas's musketeers, the characters play an important role in Louis's education.

== English translations' subdivision into parts ==
English translations, the 268 chapters of this large work are in general broken into three parts. Other editions use a four or six-part structure. In three-volume English editions the volumes are entitled The Vicomte de Bragelonne, Louise de la Vallière (Louise the Valley Dweller), and The Man in the Iron Mask (L'Homme au Masque de Fer).

In four-volume editions volume names remain except that Louise de la Vallière and The Man in the Iron Mask move from second and third volumes to third and fourth, with Ten Years Later becoming the second volume.

The first English edition, published by George Routledge was broken into The Vicomte of Bragelonne in 1893, Ten Years Later in 1893, Louise the Valley Dweller in 1893 and The Man in the Iron Mask, published in 1893.

== Plot ==
=== Premise ===
The narrative is set between 1660 and 1667 against the background of the transformation of Louis XIV from child monarch to Sun King.

=== Part One: The Vicomte of Bragelonne (Chapters 1–93) ===
After 35 years of loyal service, d'Artagnan resigns as lieutenant of the Musketeers as he perceives the young king Louis XIV as weak-willed. He resolves to aid the exiled Charles II to retake the throne of England, unaware that Athos is attempting the same. With their assistance Charles II is restored to the throne and d'Artagnan is rewarded richly.

In France, Cardinal Mazarin has died, leaving Louis to assume power with Jean-Baptiste Colbert as his finance minister. Colbert has an intense hatred for his superior, the king's Superintendent of Finances, Nicolas Fouquet, and tries to bring about his fall. He brings to the king's attention that Fouquet is fortifying his fief of Belle Île secretly. Louis persuades d'Artagnan to re-enter his service, and tasks him to investigate Belle Île, promising him a substantial salary and promotion to Captain of the King's Musketeers on his return. Louis, finally growing into a decisive ruler, also accepts an offer relayed by Athos from Charles II to marry Louis's brother Philippe I, Duke of Orléans to Charles's sister Henrietta Anne Stuart.

D'Artagnan confirms that Belle Île is being fortified and the architect ostensibly in charge is Porthos, though the drawings show the handwriting of Aramis, who is now the bishop of Vannes. Aramis, suspicious of d'Artagnan, sends Porthos back to Paris to warn Fouquet, whilst tricking d'Artagnan into searching for Porthos around Vannes. Porthos warns Fouquet in the nick of time, and he cedes Belle Île to the king, humiliating Colbert. On returning from the mission, d'Artagnan is made Captain of the King's Musketeers anyway.

Meanwhile, Princess Henrietta arrives in France escorted by the second Duke of Buckingham, to be met by an embassy consisting of Raoul de Bragelonne, the illegitimate son of Athos; his close friend Armand de Gramont, Comte de Guiche; and the Comte de Wardes, son of the previous Comte de Wardes from The Three Musketeers. The erratic Buckingham is madly in love with the princess and can scarcely conceal it, while Guiche soon finds himself equally smitten. Philippe, though little attracted to women, becomes horribly jealous of Buckingham and has him exiled after the wedding.

=== Part Two: Louise de la Vallière (Chapters 94–180) ===
This part mostly concerns romantic events at the court of Louis XIV. Raoul de Bragelonne finds his childhood sweetheart, Louise de La Vallière, is maid of honour to the Princess. Fearing a tarnishing of Louise's reputation by affairs at court, Raoul seeks to marry her. His father, Athos, the Comte de la Fère, disapproves, but eventually, out of love for his son, reluctantly agrees. The king, however, refuses to sanction the marriage because Louise is of inferior social status, and so marriage is delayed.

Meanwhile, the struggle for power begins between Fouquet and Colbert. Louis attempts to impoverish Fouquet by asking for money to pay for a grand fête at Fontainebleau. Meanwhile, Aramis meets the governor of the Bastille M. de Baisemeaux, and learns of a secret prisoner who bears a striking resemblance to Louis XIV. Aramis uses this secret to persuade the dying general of the Jesuits to name him his successor.

After Buckingham leaves France, the Comte de Guiche grows besotted with Henrietta, as soon does Louis XIV. To avoid her new husband being jealous Henrietta suggests that the king choose a young lady at court to act as a smokescreen for their flirtation. They select Louise de la Vallière for this part, but during the fête, the king overhears Louise confess her attraction for him to friends, and promptly forgets his affection for Henrietta. That same night Henrietta hears de Guiche confess his love for her to Raoul. She and the Comte pursue their own love affair. Aware of Louise's attachment, the king sends Raoul to England indefinitely as a diplomatic envoy.

Rumours of the king's love affair cause friction with de Wardes, who has inherited from his father a hatred of d'Artagnan and all those associated with him. De Guiche is forced to fight a duel with him and is defeated and seriously wounded. The incident is the last straw for Madame Henrietta who resolves to dismiss Louise from her service as Maid of Honour. The king dissuades Henrietta, but she prevents the king from seeing Louise. The king circumvents Henrietta, and so she contacts her brother King Charles II, imploring him to eject Raoul from England. On his return to France, Henrietta informs him of Louise's affair with Louis, breaking his heart.

Athos finds out everything and spits his contempt at Louis XIV. The young King orders Athos's imprisonment, but D'Artagnan convinces him to release him.

=== Part Three: The Man in the Iron Mask (Chapters 181–269) ===
Aramis has found out from his former mistress the Duchesse de Chevreuse that the lookalike of Louis XIV imprisoned in the Bastille is the king's twin brother, Philippe, who had been concealed and imprisoned from birth by his father, Louis XIII, and his mother, Anne of Austria, "for the good of France".

Aramis plots to replace Louis with Philippe as a puppet ruler for himself and his patron Fouquet, and even intends to become in turn the next Pope.

Through an elaborate subterfuge mounted by Aramis, Philippe replaces a prisoner due for release from the Bastille and escapes to Vaux. Meanwhile, Fouquet is throwing a lavish party for Louis at Vaux. Colbert poisons the king further against Fouquet.

While the king is still visiting Fouquet at Vaux, Aramis initiates the second half of his plan and abducts Louis, imprisoning him in the Bastille in Philippe's place. He then substitutes Philippe for the King. Porthos is an uncomprehending accomplice in all this, believing that he is removing an impostor instead of the real king.

Aramis conspiratorially informs Fouquet of his acts, but Fouquet wants no part in such treachery and rushes to the Bastille, rescues Louis, and brings him back to Vaux to confront Philippe. Realising that his plot has unravelled, Aramis flees for Belle Île to escape the king's impending wrath, taking Porthos with him. Louis regains the throne with d'Artagnan's help, ending Philippe's brief reign. Louis imprisons Philippe once more, ordering that "he will cover his face with an iron visor" which he "cannot raise without peril of his life."

Athos and Raoul meet Aramis and Porthos who relate their predicament before receiving horses to aid their journey to Belle Île. They next meet the Duke de Beaufort, on his way to Algiers for an expedition against the Barbary corsairs. Raoul, devastated by the king's love affair with Louise, volunteers to join the Duke in his expedition. Soon Raoul is off to war in North Africa, and Athos is retired.

Despite Fouquet's refusal to go along with Aramis's plot, Louis orders d'Artagnan to arrest him, which he manages following an epic chase. Louis then orders d'Artagnan to arrest Porthos and Aramis. D'Artagnan feigns compliance whilst secretly giving his friends time to escape. However, Colbert discerns d'Artagnan's sympathies and undermines him. D'Artagnan resigns on learning that prisoners are to be executed immediately once arrested.

Attempting an escape from Belle Île, Porthos is killed, while Aramis escapes to sea, remorseful for the first time in his life. Meanwhile, Athos returns to his estates and lapses into decline. On hearing that Raoul has died in action at Gigelli, Athos succumbs to grief and dies. Meanwhile, the detained d'Artagnan is freed by King Louis and reinstated. He learns of Porthos's death and Aramis's escape.

Thanks to the secret power of the Jesuits, which he now commands, Aramis reaches Spain and becomes Duc d'Almeda, Spain's ambassador to France. Louise de la Vallière is eventually supplanted in the king's affections by her erstwhile friend Madame de Montespan. Louis grows in power and stature, and embarks on a military campaign against the Dutch Republic, with d'Artagnan commanding the offensive. D'Artagnan is mortally wounded in battle during a siege moments after reading he is to be made Marshal of France. His final words are: "Athos, Porthos, au revoir! Aramis, adieu forever!"

== Analysis ==
French academic Jean-Yves Tadié has argued that the beginning of King Louis XIV's personal rule is the novel's real subject.

== Reception ==
In his essay "A Gossip on a Novel of Dumas's", author and critic Robert Louis Stevenson writes that "it is in the character of D'Artagnan, that we must look for the spirit of morality, which is one of the chief merits of the book, makes one of the main joys of its perusal, and sets it high above more popular rivals."

However, Arthur F. Davidson argues in Alexandre Dumas: His Life and Works that The Vicomte is truly the story of Porthos, whose character was informed by Dumas's own experiences and his father's: "The modern reader may draw back aghast at the six volumes of Le Vicomte de Bragelonne, but he will have missed the best part of the Musketeer cycle should he fail to read those pages which describe the end of Porthos—true epic pages such as Homer's self had not disowned."

== Adaptations ==
The third section of the novel, The Man in the Iron Mask, has been adapted many times in film, television and other media; see Man in the Iron Mask § In popular culture.

The seventh The Adventures of Wishbone book, The Mutt in the Iron Muzzle is a retelling.

The long fantasy novel The Viscount of Adrilankha (2002–2004) by Steven Brust is loosely based on The Vicomte de Bragelonne. It was published in three volumes.

The Three Musketeers 1966 TV series had a second sequel entitled The Man in the Iron Mask. This aired on the BBC in 1968 in 9 installments. This serial is now lost.
