= The Regent's Daughter =

The Regent's Daughter (French: Une Fille du Régent) is a historical novel by Alexandre Dumas, written in 1845, and later adapted as a "serio-comic" play in five acts. It has sometimes been subtitled as a sequel to The Conspirators.

In 1957-1958 it was also adapted into a newspaper comic by Gilbert Bloch.
