= The Conspirators (Dumas and Maquet novel) =

1843 novel by Alexandre Dumas and Auguste Maquet

The Conspirators (original French title: Le chevalier d'Harmental) is a novel written by Alexandre Dumas and Auguste Maquet, published in 1843. Dumas reworked a preliminary version by Maquet; this was the beginning of their collaboration which was to produce eighteen novels and many plays. The dramatisation of the novel – in five acts, a prologue and ten tableaux – was first performed on 16 July 1849 at the Théâtre-Historique in Paris. It was adapted into an opera, Le chevalier d'Harmental, by André Messager with a libretto by Paul Ferrier, which was first performed on 5 May 1896.

== Plot ==
The novel is set in 1718, and its subject is a conspiracy against the regency of Philippe d'Orléans, who led France during the infancy of Louis XV. Dumas and Maquet's later novel Une fille du régent features some of the same characters.

== Reception ==
George Saintsbury described the novel as "usually ranked among [Dumas's] masterpieces"; Dumas himself felt it had both strengths and weaknesses. Richard Stowe, Dumas's biographer, called it the best of his novels set during the reign of Louis XV.

== Impact ==
A section of the novel involving a street named "rue du Temps-Perdu" (street of wasted time) may have inspired the title of Marcel Proust's À la recherche du temps perdu.
