= The d'Artagnan Romances =

19th c. novels by Alexandre Dumas

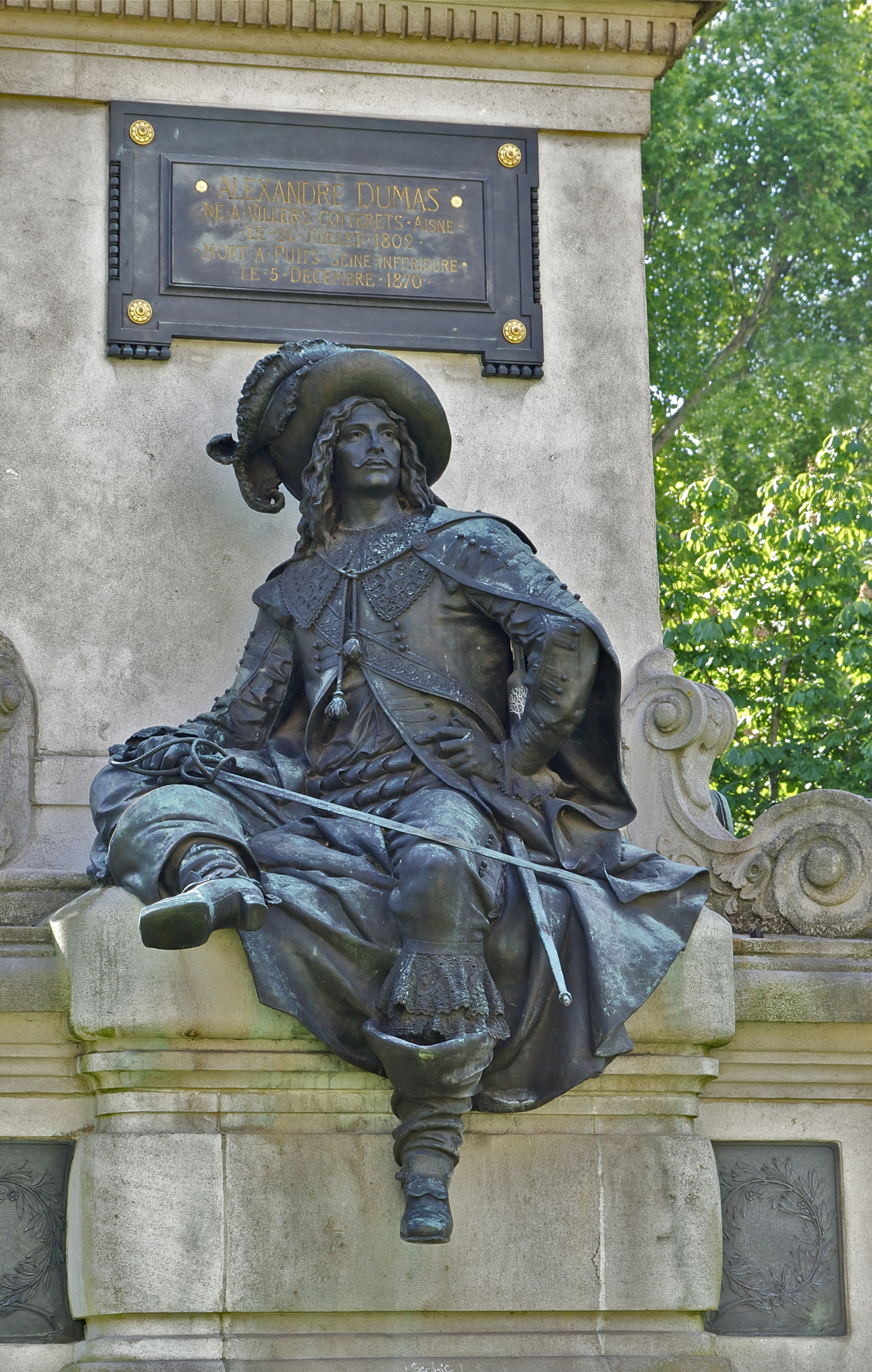
Statue of D'Artagnan on Gustave Doré's monument to Alexandre Dumas in Place du Général-Catroux

The d'Artagnan Romances are a set of three novels by Alexandre Dumas (1802–1870), telling the story of the 17th-century musketeer d'Artagnan.

Dumas based the character and attributes of d'Artagnan on captain of musketeers Charles de Batz-Castelmore d'Artagnan (c. 1611 – 1673) and the portrayal was particularly indebted to d'Artagnan's semi-fictionalized memoirs as written 27 years after the hero's death by Gatien de Courtilz de Sandras (published 1700).

== Books in the series ==
- The Three Musketeers, set between 1625 and 1628; first published in serial form in the magazine Le Siècle between March and July 1844. Dumas claims in the foreword to have based it on manuscripts he had discovered in the Bibliothèque Nationale.
- Twenty Years After, set between 1648 and 1649; serialized from January to August 1845.
- The Vicomte of Bragelonne: Ten Years Later, set between 1660 and 1673; serialized from October 1847 to January 1850. This vast novel has been split into three, four, or five volumes at various points.
  - In the three-volume edition, the novels are titled The Vicomte de Bragelonne, Louise de la Vallière and The Man in the Iron Mask.
  - In the four-volume edition, the novels are titled The Vicomte de Bragelonne, Ten Years Later, Louise de la Vallière and The Man in the Iron Mask.
  - The five-volume edition generally does not give titles to the smaller portions.

== Other connected books ==
The Red Sphinx is a sequel to The Three Musketeers, written by Dumas but left incomplete after 75 chapters. It is a sequel in story terms, but none of the Musketeers appear; the story chiefly follows Cardinal Richelieu, Queen Anne, and King Louis XIII, and a new hero, the Count of Moret (based on the real-life Antoine de Moret). It was first published in France in 1946. A new English translation appeared in 2017 (with a large chapter called Les Habitués de l'Hotel de Rambouillet omitted and left untranslated) in which the story was "completed" by the addition of Dumas's novella "The Dove".

== Unofficial sequels ==
Several sequels have been written by other writers since Dumas's death.

- The Son of Porthos (1883) – written by Paul Mahalin, but published under the pen name "Alexandre Dumas" and still sold as such. d'Artagnan does not appear in this book.
- D'Artagnan Kingmaker (1900) – supposedly based on one of Dumas's plays.
- The King's Passport (1925) – by H. Bedford-Jones.
- D'Artagnan, the sequel to the Three Musketeers (1928) – by H. Bedford-Jones.

== Other adaptations ==
Fantasy novelist Steven Brust's Khaavren Romances books have all used Dumas novels (particularly the d'Artagnan Romances) as their chief inspiration, recasting the plots of those novels to fit within Brust's established world of Dragaera. His 2020 novel The Baron of Magister Valley follows suit, using The Count of Monte Cristo as a starting point.

Sarah Hoyt's (nom de plume Sarah D'Almeida) Musketeers series begins with Death of a Musketeer, a Mystery Book Club selection, and includes four other titles from Berkley Prime Crime and Goldport Press.
