= Chaotic (novella) =

2006 novella by Kelley Armstrong

- Collection book cover
- Author: Kelley Armstrong
- Language: English
- Series: Women of the Otherworld
- Genre: Fantasy novel
- Publisher: Viking Press
- Publication date: April 2006
- Publication place: United States
- Media type: Print (hardback & paperback) & Audio Book (Cassette)
- Pages: 416 pp
- ISBN: 0-06-085409-X
- OCLC: 65199873
- LC Class: CPB Box no. 2456 vol. 19
- Preceded by: Haunted
- Followed by: Broken

Chaotic, part of the Women of the Otherworld series, is a novella written by Kelley Armstrong. It was published in an anthology of supernatural-themed novellas, called "Dates From Hell." This novella takes place between Haunted and Broken in the Women of the Otherworld series.

== Plot summary ==
Hope Adams is a half-demon who works for the ''True News'' tabloid, using her position to investigate paranormal events and prevent public exposure of the supernatural world. Her handler assigns her to attend a museum charity gala with a date, where she encounters Karl Marsten, a werewolf thief. Hope suspects that the assignment is another test arranged by her handler. Karl Marsten...

== Characters ==
- Karl Marsten - werewolf and professional thief.
- Hope Adams - half-demon and tabloid writer.
