= Chaotic (disambiguation) =

Chaotic is a trading card game / TV series franchise.

- Chaotic Trading Card Game
- Chaotic (TV series), an animated TV series

Chaotic may also refer to:

- Chaotic (novella), a 2006 novella by Kelley Armstrong
- Britney and Kevin: Chaotic, a short-lived 2005 reality TV series starring Britney Spears and Kevin Federline
  - Britney & Kevin: Chaotic (EP), an EP by Britney Spears, made alongside the series, or its track "Chaotic"
- "Chaotic", a song by Loona Odd Eye Circle from the EP Mix & Match, 2017
- "Chaotic", a song by Tate McRae from the album I Used to Think I Could Fly
- Chaotic, a possible alignment in Dungeons and Dragons and related role-playing games

== See also ==
- Chaos (disambiguation)
- Chaotics, a strategic business framework and platform for dealing with economic turbulence
- Chaos theory
