= Laura Vandervoort =

Canadian actress (born 1984)

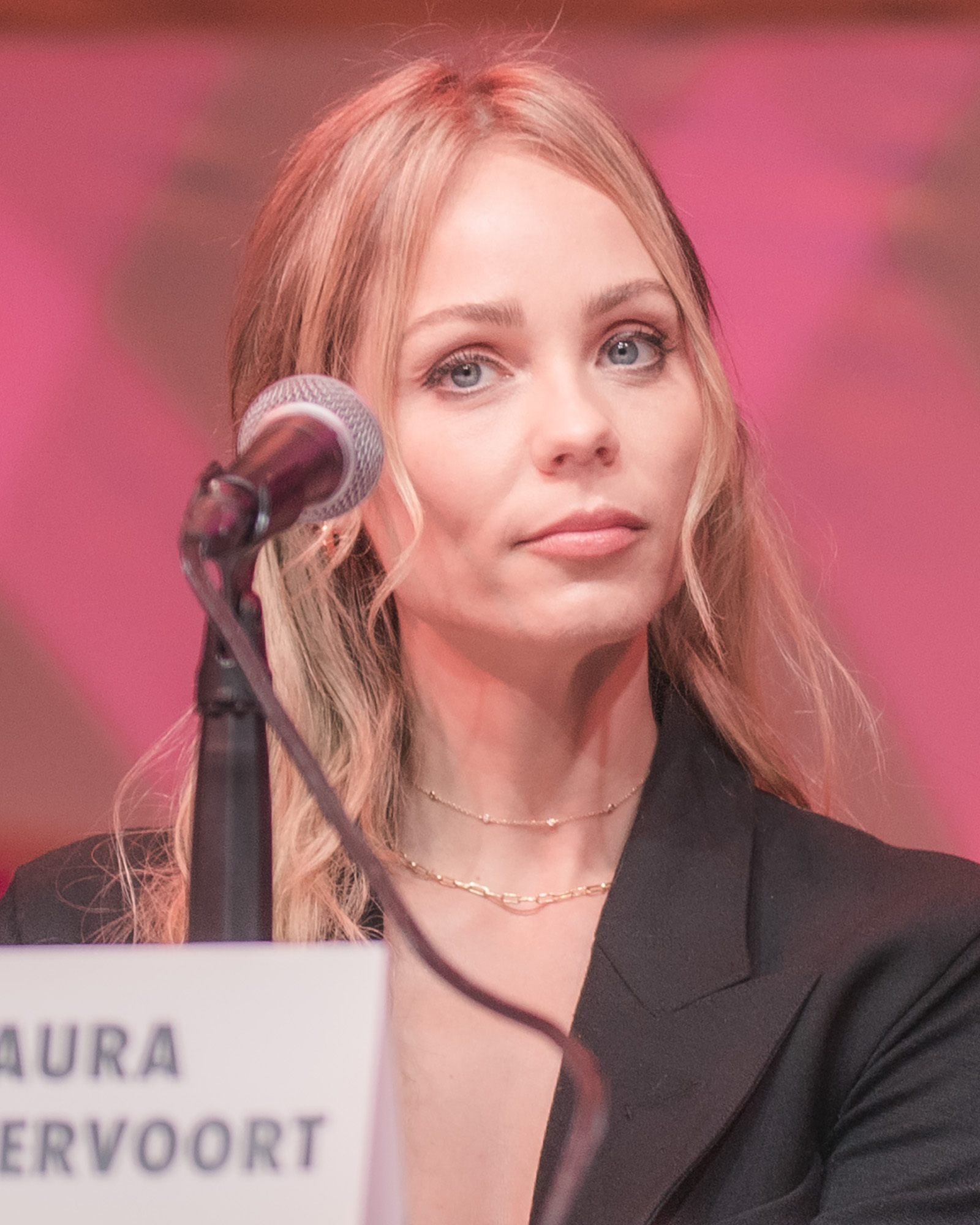
- Vandervoort in 2021
- Born: Laura Dianne Vandervoort; September 22, 1984 (age 42); Toronto, Ontario, Canada
- Occupation: Actress
- Years active: 1997–present
- Spouse: Adam Coates (m. 2025)
- Website: lauravandervoort.com

Laura Dianne Vandervoort (born September 22, 1984) is a Canadian actress. She is best known for her role as Lisa in the ABC science fiction series V (2009). She is also known for her role as Sadie Harrison in the CTV teen drama series Instant Star, Arla "The Bolt-Gun Killer" Cogan in the Syfy supernatural drama series Haven, and Kara Zor-El (Supergirl) in The CW serial drama series Smallville. In 2014, she starred in the Space channel drama series Bitten, a television adaptation of Kelley Armstrong's book series Women of the Otherworld as Elena Michaels.

== Early life ==
Vandervoort was born and raised in Toronto, Ontario. She is the daughter of a Canadian mother and a Dutch father. In the first weeks of her life, she contracted meningitis, resulting in a severe sickness that lasted a few months. Her parents were initially told she was not going to survive. Growing up, Vandervoort was involved in several sports such as football, karate (where she is a second-degree black belt), basketball, tennis, gymnastics and baseball. She has an older sister, Sarah and she is related to Canadian actor Gordon Pinsent.

== Career ==
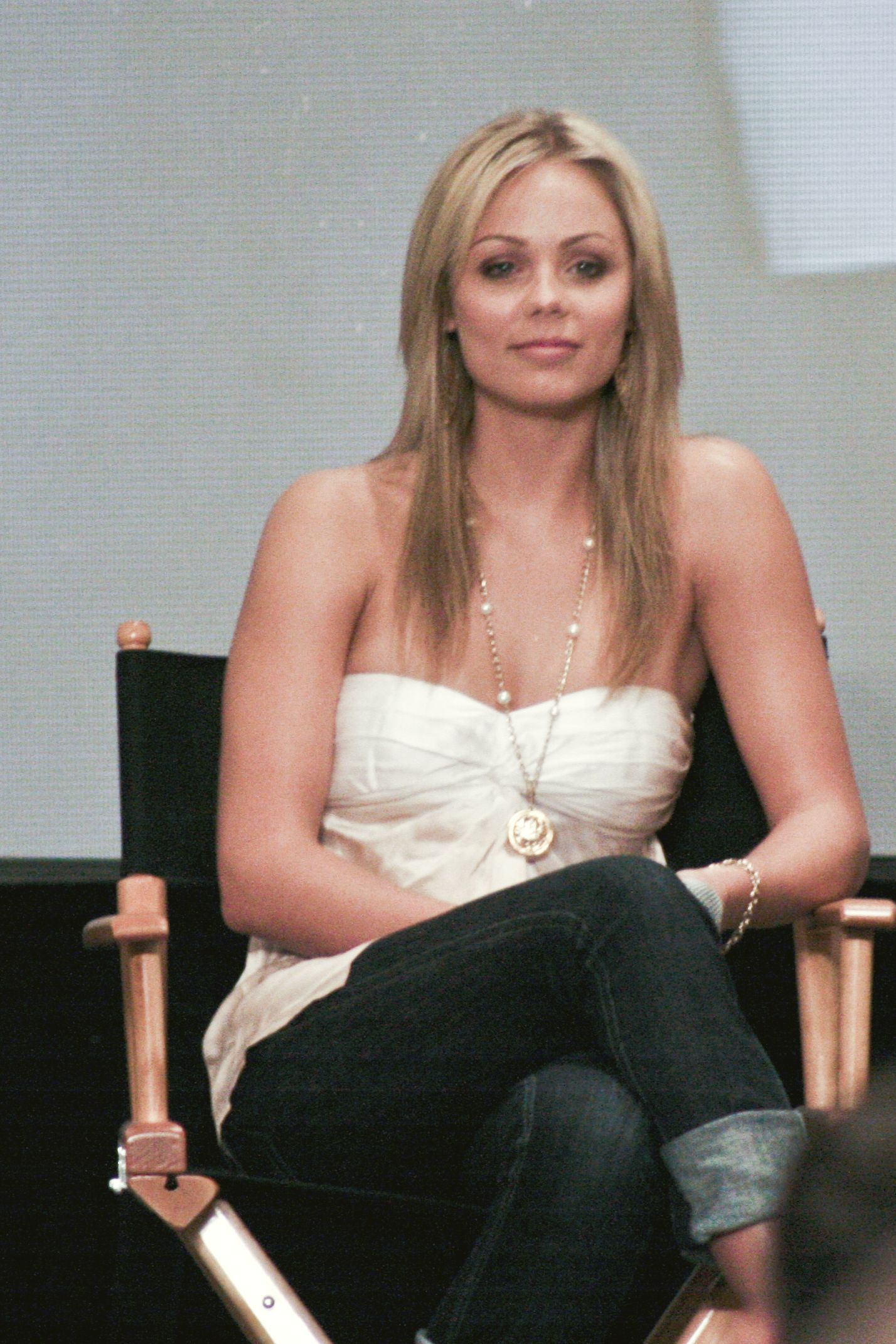
Laura Vandervoort in 2008

In 1997, she made her acting debut at age 13. After taking several classes and doing background work on Canadian shows such as Road to Avonlea and Harriet the Spy, she got her first speaking role in the Canadian children's horror anthology series Goosebumps and Are You Afraid of the Dark?, both series were aired on YTV.

After commercials and guest starring roles in Mutant X, Prom Queen: The Marc Hall Story, Goosebumps, Twice in a Lifetime, Doc, Sue Thomas: F.B.Eye, Troubled Waters, The Dresden Files, and a few Disney Channel original films (Mom's Got a Date with a Vampire and Alley Cats Strike), at age 19, while attending York University where she studied Psychology and English, Vandervoort landed a lead role as Sadie Harrison in the CTV teen drama series Instant Star, which ran for four seasons.

In 2006, Vandervoort starred in her first feature film titled The Lookout alongside Jeff Daniels, Joseph Gordon-Levitt, Matthew Goode, and Isla Fisher. Several other television appearances such as CSI: Crime Scene Investigation led Vandervoort to the role of Clark Kent's Kryptonian cousin "Kara Kent" (the woman destined to become Supergirl) in The CW serial drama series Smallville. She was a regular in season seven, and appeared in the "Bloodline" episode for season eight. She then returned for another two episodes in the tenth and final season of Smallville.

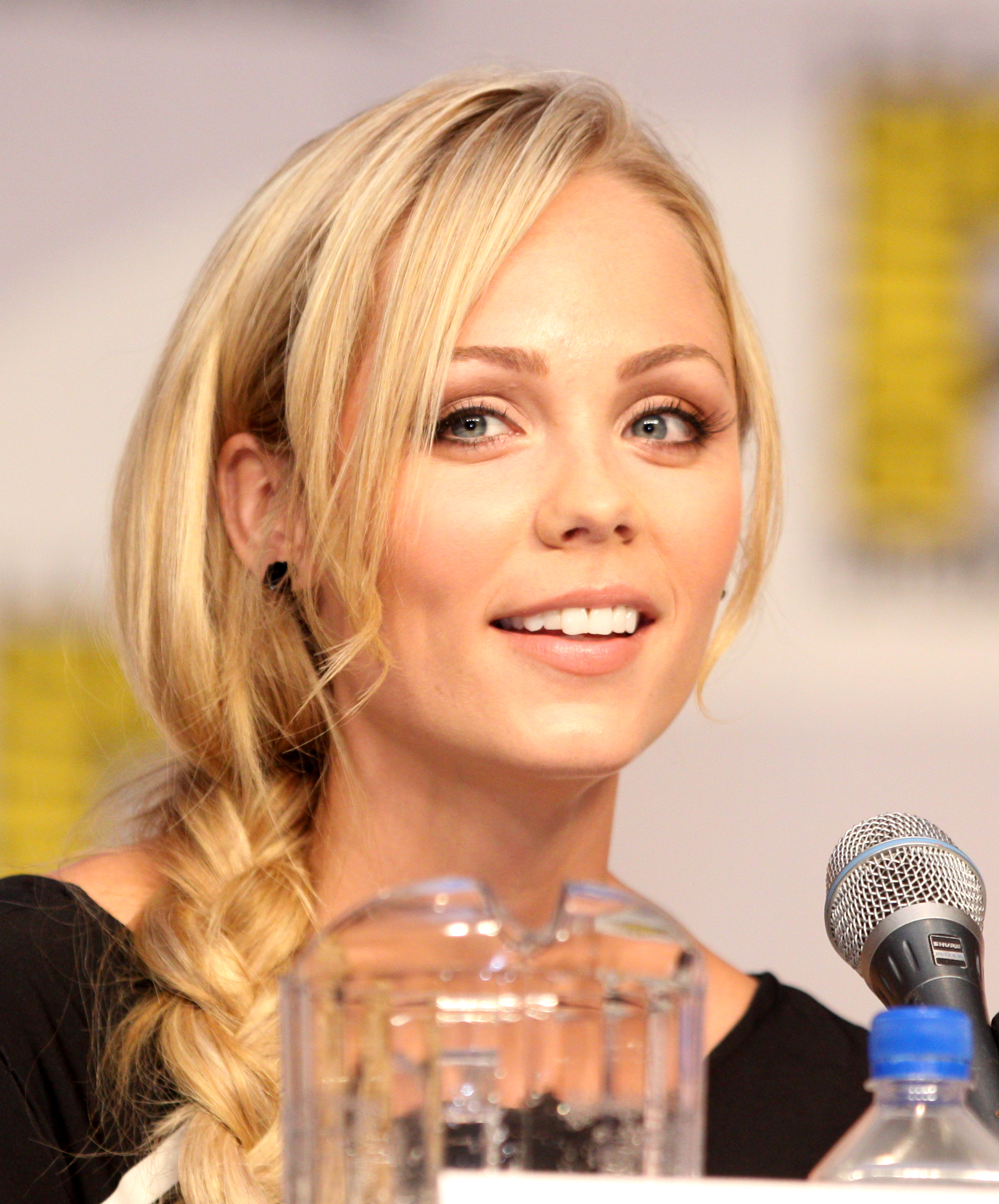
Vandervoort at San Diego Comic-Con in July 2010

Following The CW and Smallville, Vandervoort then shot the sequel to the feature film Into the Blue titled Into the Blue 2: The Reef. She next filmed an independent production titled The Jazzman, which also starred Canadian stars Michael Ironside (who appeared in the second V miniseries as well as the 1984 V regular series) and Corey Sevier.

Vandervoort portrayed "Lisa", an extraterrestrial Visitor, in the 2009 ABC science fiction series V, a reboot of the 1980s science fiction franchise of the same name.

In 2010, Vandervoort appeared in the two-part miniseries Riverworld in which she plays Jessie Machalan, the fiancée of war correspondent Matt Ellman who wakes up after death on a planet populated by everyone who has ever lived on Earth. In 2011, she starred in the suspense film The Entitled, alongside Ray Liotta and Kevin Zegers.

In October 2011, she posed for PETA as part of the "Exotic Skins" campaign and in 2014, she appeared nude again for an ad that protested against the keeping of marine mammals in captivity. In 2012, she had a small role in Seth MacFarlane's comedy film Ted, playing Mark Wahlberg's coworker Tanya.

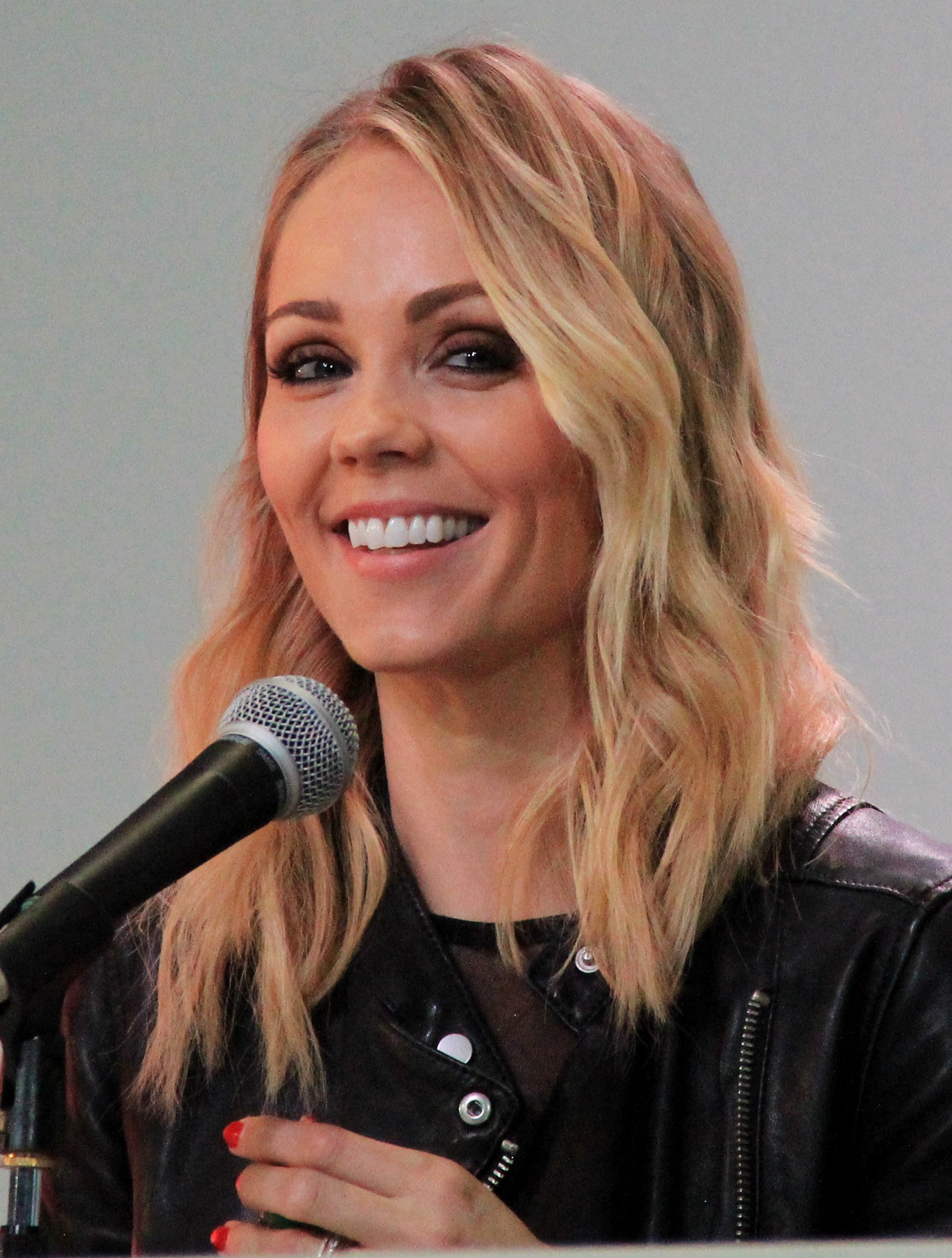
Vandervoort in 2016

In 2014, she appeared in the TV adaptation of the Kelley Armstrong novel Bitten.

In 2016, Vandervoort appeared as the supervillain Indigo/Brainiac 8 in three episodes of season one of the CBS action-adventure series Supergirl.

In 2019, Vandervoort appeared in the Netflix adaptation of the Jonathan Maberry book series V Wars alongside Ian Somerhalder, Adrian Holmes, and Peter Outerbridge.

== Personal life ==
Vandervoort resides in Toronto, Ontario. In 2013, she was engaged to actor Oliver Trevena, but the engagement was called off in 2015. In 2023, she became engaged to Adam Coates, chief revenue officer of the Decibel Cannabis Company and they married on September 6, 2025 in Langdon Hall Country House, Hotel & Spa, in Canada.

== Filmography ==
=== Film ===
Year	Title	Role	Notes
1999	Penny's Odyssey	Tanya	Television film
2000	Alley Cats Strike	Lauren	Television film (Disney Channel Original Movie)
2000	Mom's Got a Date with a Vampire	Chelsea Hansen	Television film (Disney Channel Original Movie); Nominated – Young Artist Award for Best Performance in a TV Movie (Comedy): Leading Young Actress
2004	Prom Queen: The Marc Hall Story	Young Girl	Television film; uncredited
2005	Falcon Beach	Ashley	Television film
2006	Troubled Waters	Carolyn	
2007	The Lookout	Kelly	
2009	Out of Control	Marcie Cutler	Television film
2009	Into the Blue 2: The Reef	Dani White	Direct-to-video
2009	The Jazzman	Sara	
2009	Damage	Frankie	Direct-to-video
2010	Riverworld	Jessie Machalan	Television film
2011	The Entitled	Hailey Jones	
2011	Desperately Seeking Santa	Jennifer Walker	Television film
2012	This Means War	Britta	
2012	Broken Trust	Sophie	Television film
2012	Ted	Tanya	
2012	Finding Mrs. Claus	Noelle	Television film
2014	Cubicle Warriors	Jessica	
2014	Life of the Party	Bea	
2014	Coffee Shop	Donavan Turner	Television film
2017	Jigsaw	Anna	
2019	Rabid	Rose Miller	
2021	Trigger Point	Fiona Snow	
2021	See for Me	Debra	

=== Television ===
Year	Title	Role	Notes
1997–1998	Goosebumps	Nadine Platt / Sheena Deep	"The Haunted House Game" (season 3; episode 10) "Deep Trouble: Part 1" (season 4; episode 7) "Deep Trouble: Part 2" (season 4; episode 8)
2000	Are You Afraid of the Dark?	Ashley Fox	"The Tale of the Laser Maze" (season 7; episode 11)
2000	Twice in a Lifetime	Misty Reynolds	"Even Steven" (season 2; episode 15)
2001	Mutant X	Tina	"Russian Roulette" (season 1; episode 3)
2002	The Gavin Crawford Show	The Girl	1 episode
2004–2008	Instant Star	Sadie Harrison	Main role; 49 episodes
2004	Doc	Annis Bennington	"The Family Tree" (season 5; episode 6)
2005	72 Hours: True Crime	Leanne	"Head in a Bucket" (season 2; episode 10)
2005	Sue Thomas: F.B.Eye	Gabbie	"Bad Girls" (season 3; episode 18)
2007	The Dresden Files	Natalie	"Bad Blood" (season 1; episode 5)
2007	CSI: Crime Scene Investigation	Miss Tangiers	"Big Shots" (season 7; episode 19)
2007–2011	Smallville	Kara Zor-El	23 episodes Main role (season 7); Guest star (season 8 and season 10)
2009–2011	V	Lisa	Main role; 22 episodes
2011	Family Guy	Jenny / Third Bully Girl (voices)	"Friends of Peter G." (season 9; episode 10) "Trading Places" (season 9; episode 13)
2012	White Collar	Sophie Covington	"Parting Shots" (season 4; episode 4)
2012	Finding Mrs. Claus	Noelle	Television film
2013	Haven	Arla Cogan	"Reunion" (season 3; episode 12) "Thanks for the Memories" (season 3; episode 13)
2013	CSI: NY	Marcy Sullivan	"Nine Thirteen" (season 9; episode 13)
2014–2016	Bitten	Elena Michaels	Main role
2016	Supergirl	Indigo / Brainiac 8	Recurring role; 3 episodes
2016–2018	Ice	Tessa	Recurring role; 5 episodes
2017	Frankie Drake Mysteries	Sophia Devoe	"Out of Focus" (season 1; episode 5)
2018–2019	Private Eyes	Dana Edson	"Shadow of a Doubt" (season 2; episode 18) and "Catch Me If You Can" (season 3; episode 1)
2019	V Wars	Mila Dubov	6 episodes
2020	A Christmas Exchange	Molly	Television film
2021	Playing Cupid	Ms Kerri Fox	Television film
2021	The Handmaid's Tale	Daisy	"Nightshade" (season 4; episode 2)
2021	Romance in the Wilds	Roma Thompson	Television film
2021	Christmas in the Wilds	Roma Thompson	Television film
2021	A Christmas Together with You	Megan	Television film
2023	Black Bags	Sara	Television film
2025	Law & Order Toronto:Criminal Intent	Jessica Cartwright	"The Man in the Stadium" (season 2; episode 7)
2025	Murdoch Mysteries	Agent DuMaurier	"The Borden Ultimatum"

=== Video games ===
Year	Title	Voice role	Notes
2011	Spider-Man: Edge of Time	Mary Jane Watson	

=== Music videos ===
Year	Title	Artist	Role	Notes
2015	"Ruthless Love"	Alexz Johnson	Ballerina	

== Awards and nominations ==
Year	Award	Category	Work	Result	Reference
2001	Young Artist Awards	Best Performance in a TV Movie (Comedy) – Leading Young Actress	Mom's Got a Date with a Vampire	Nominated	
2016	Golden Maple Awards	Best actress in a TV series broadcast in the U.S.	Bitten	Nominated	
