= Rockton =

Rockton may refer to:

- Rockton, Illinois
- Rockton Township, Winnebago County, Illinois
- Rockton, a hamlet in Amsterdam (town), New York
- Rockton, Pennsylvania
- Rockton, Wisconsin
- Rockton, prior name for Little Falls (city), New York
- Rockton, setting of the novel City of the Lost
- Rockton World's Fair an annual festival in Hamilton, Ontario, Canada
- Rockton, South Carolina a locality served by the Rockton and Rion Railway
- Rockton, Ontario, Canada served by the nearby Rockton Airport
- Rockton and Rion Railroad Historic District
- Rockton Mountain
- Rockton, Ipswich, a heritage-listed villa at Rockton Street in Newtown, City of Ipswich, Queensland, Australia
- Rockton, a Swedish leasing company
