= No Humans Involved =

No Humans Involved may refer to:

- As reported by Sylvia Wynter, a designation used by the Los Angeles Police Department to mark instances of police brutality against young, unemployed black men.
- "No Humans Involved" (CSI), a fifth-season episode of the television series CSI: Crime Scene Investigation
- No Humans Involved (novel), the seventh novel in Kelley Armstrong's fantasy series Women of the Otherworld
