= Frostbitten (Armstrong novel) =

2009 novel by Kelley Armstrong

- First edition
- Author: Kelley Armstrong
- Language: English
- Series: Women of the Otherworld
- Genre: Urban fantasy
- Publisher: Random House Canada
- Publication date: September 29, 2009
- Publication place: Canada
- Media type: Print (Hardcover & Paperback)
- Pages: 352 pp (hardcover); 560 pp (paperback)
- ISBN: 0-679314873
- Preceded by: Living with the Dead
- Followed by: Waking the Witch

Frostbitten is the tenth novel in Women of the Otherworld series by Kelley Armstrong.

== Plot ==
Deep within the Alaskan wilderness, Elena and Clayton, returning from a hunt, discover a horrific scene: a family slaughtered, the victims bearing the unmistakable mark of a werewolf attack. The brutality of the attack, however, is unlike anything they've seen before. Elena and Clayton, aided by their Pack, begin investigating. The clues point to a pair of rogue werewolves, but the savagery of the killings suggests something far more sinister. The scent of the killer is unlike anything they've encountered, wild and primal, hinting at a creature that is more wolf than human. The trail leads them deep into the Alaskan wilderness, a sprawling landscape of icy forests and frozen tundras. The harsh conditions make the hunt even more perilous, testing both Elena and Clayton's physical and mental limits. As they delve deeper, they encounter whispered tales from locals about the Wendigo, a monstrous, shape-shifting spirit that devours human flesh and embodies the dark side of human hunger. The legends of this creature, with its uncanny resemblance to the killer they are pursuing, fuel their growing sense of unease.

The hunt's perils, Elena and Clayton are haunted by their own personal demons. Elena struggles with the responsibility and pressures of becoming the Pack Alpha, fearing the burden it will place on her. Clayton is conflicted by his own ambition and his desire to support Elena's leadership. The Pack Alpha's position is left vacant by the previous leader's mysterious disappearance, and both Elena and Clayton are potential candidates. As the hunt progresses, the pressure to claim the Alpha position weighs heavily on them, forcing them to confront their individual desires and their commitment to each other. Elena discovers a hidden connection between the Wendigo legend and a horrifying incident from her past, which she suppressed. This revelation throws the investigation into a new light, suggesting a possible motive for the killings and a deeper connection to the mysterious creature.

In a pivotal moment, Elena and Clayton corner the rogue werewolves, only to discover that they are not the primary source of the killings. The real killer, revealed as a monstrous creature with a twisted and horrifying human aspect, emerges from the shadows. They learn that the creature is not a spirit, but a werewolf that has been transformed by a centuries-old curse linked to the Wendigo myth. Elena and Clayton face the monstrous creature in a harrowing battle, pushing their physical and emotional limits. Clayton, driven by a primal instinct, claims the Alpha position, asserting his dominance and protecting Elena.

As they confront the monstrous creature, Elena, despite the internal struggle, recognizes that Clayton is the best leader for the Pack. They manage to defeat the creature and save the community, but at a high cost. Clayton's choice to become Alpha leaves a lasting impact on their relationship, forcing them to redefine their bond and their roles within the Pack. The battle leaves a trail of destruction, and the Pack is depleted. Elena and Clayton, as the new Alpha pair, face a challenge to rebuild their community and establish their leadership while still wrestling with the personal and emotional fallout from the conflict.

The hunt continues on a note of hope and resilience. Elena and Clayton's love for each other remains strong, and their shared experience has solidified their bond. They embrace their new roles as Alphas, uniting the Pack and ensuring a future where both human and werewolf can coexist. However, the threat of the Wendigo curse still lingers, a reminder of the darkness that lurks within the wilderness, a darkness that could return, testing their strength once more.

== Characters ==
- Elena Michaels - The professional photographer and the protagonist of the Frostbitten trilogy.
- Jeremy Danvers - A centuries-old werewolf and Elena's love interest.
- Clayton Danvers - Jeremy's younger brother and a member of the Royal Vampire Court.
- Antonio Sorrentino - A werewolf and Elena's loyal companion.
- Nicholas Sorrentino - Antonio's brother and a powerful werewolf.
- Morgan Walsh - The witch and Elena's friend.
- Joey Stillwell - A human sheriff who initially becomes suspicious of Elena's activities.
- Noah Stillwell - Joey's son and a close friend of Elena.
- Reese Williams - A mysterious hunter and Elena's rival.
