= Industrial Magic =

2004 novel by Kelley Armstrong

- Time Warner (UK) cover art
- Author: Kelley Armstrong
- Cover artist: Dominic Harman
- Language: English
- Series: Women of the Otherworld
- Genre: Urban fantasy
- Publisher: Bantam Books (United States); Viking Press (Canada)
- Publication date: October 26, 2004
- Publication place: United States
- Media type: Print (Hardcover & Paperback) & Audio Book (Cassette)
- Pages: 528 (paperback edition)
- ISBN: 1-84149-340-6 (paperback edition)
- OCLC: 56650029
- Preceded by: Dime Store Magic
- Followed by: Haunted

Industrial Magic is a fantasy novel by Canadian author Kelley Armstrong. The fourth book in the Women of the Otherworld series, features the witch Paige Winterbourne.

== Plot ==
Dana MacArthur, a young witch, finds herself grappling with her destiny as the daughter of a Cabal employee. Disillusioned by her inability to persuade fellow witches to join her cause due to their disapproval of her relationship with Lucas Cortez, Paige Winterbourne receives an unexpected visit from Lucas's father, Benicio Cortez.

The elder Cortez brings news of a series of attacks targeting children of Cabal employees, including Dana. Disturbed by this revelation, Lucas and Paige embark on a journey to Miami to investigate the matter further. They meet with Benicio and learn that Dana's attack is part of a pattern. That night, another tragedy strikes when Griffin's son, the bodyguard's child, is killed. Griffin implores Paige and Lucas to uncover the truth behind these sinister events.

Concerned about their friend Savannah's safety, Paige and Lucas arrange for her to find sanctuary with the werewolf Pack. Seeking answers, they reach out to Jaime Vegas, a necromancer with the ability to communicate with the dead. Jaime attempts to contact Dana, who is believed to be in a coma. However, a chilling discovery awaits them: Dana is not in a coma, but has succumbed to the attack, leaving Paige and Lucas to confront the grim reality of a deadly conspiracy.

Investigation into the sinister Cabal organization, Jaime, Lucas, and Paige stumbled upon the doorstep of Everett Weber, a recluse suspected of holding vital information. While Weber remained elusive, they discovered a trove of encrypted computer files. Determined to unravel the secrets hidden within, Paige's brilliant mind deciphered the code, revealing a chilling list of children belonging to Cabal employees.

Tracking down Weber, they encountered a hostile Cabal SWAT team that instigated a hostage situation. Paige sustained injuries while Everett was forcibly taken into custody. His swift execution during the trial sent shockwaves through the group, but their respite was short-lived as tragedy struck again with the murder of the grandson of renowned detective Thomas Nast.

Undeterred, they ventured into the desolate swamps where Weber was buried, seeking his ethereal guidance. There, they encountered Esus, a mysterious figure who revealed the identity of Weber's employer. As they delved deeper into the investigation, a haunting presence emerged—a ghostly figure that eluded Jaime's efforts to communicate. Only later did they uncover its true nature: a vengeful vampire.

Their search led them to the lair of Edward and Natasha, vampires driven by the insatiable quest for immortality. Natasha, now a ghost, sought revenge for her murder at Edward's hands. A carefully orchestrated trap backfired, leaving Lucas and Paige trapped in the ethereal realm of the dead. Guided by Savannah's mother, Eve, and faced with a choice offered by the Fates, they were returned to the living world amidst a perilous encounter with the werewolves.

A charity ball became the stage for a trap to ensnare Edward, but fate intervened with dire consequences. Jaime was kidnapped, forcing Benicio to abandon his plan in a desperate attempt to save his son. United in their resolve, Jeremy, Savannah, and Paige came to their rescue, while Benicio himself executed Edward, putting an end to the vampire's reign of terror.

== Characters ==
=== Major characters ===
- Lucas Cortez - Sorcerer, lawyer, and lover of Paige Winterbourne. Son of Benicio Cortez and heir of Cortez Cabal.
- Paige Winterbourne - Witch and Former Head of American Coven. Lover of Lucas Cortez.
- Savannah Levine - 14-year-old witch and ward of Paige Winterbourne. Daughter of Eve Levine (Witch & Aspicio half Demon) & Kristof Nast (Sorcerer & heir to Nast Cabal)

=== Members of the Cortez Cabal ===
- Benicio Cortez - Head of Cortez Cabal and Father of Lucas
- Carlos Cortez - Youngest legitimate son of Benicio Cortez
- Delores Cortez - Wife of Benicio Cortez
- Dennis Malone - Half-Demon and Head of Cortez Cabal investigative unit
- Dorinda - Cortez Cabal Secretary
- Erin - Cortez Cabal Employee
- Faye Ashton - Clairvoyant
- Gloria - Cortez Cabal Employee
- Griffin - Ferratus Half-demon bodyguard of Benicio
- Hector Cortez - Eldest son of Benicio
- Jim - Half-Demon Cortez Cabal employee who previously worked for St Clouds.
- Morris - Half-demon bodyguard for Benicio.
- Randy MacArthur - Exaudio Half-Demon employed by Cortez Cabal
- Reuben Aldrich - Necromancer and Head of Actuarial Department
- Simon - Shaman working for Cortez Cabal
- Troy Morgan - Tempestras Half-demon employed by Benicio as bodyguard
- William Cortez - Middle son of Benicio Cortez

=== Other characters ===
- Aaron - Vampire and former lover of Cassandra.
- Adam Vasic - Exustio Half-demon and friend of Paige.
- Brigid - Vampire
- Cassandra DuCharme - Vampire on Inter-Racial Council.
- Clayton Danvers - Werewolf and lover of Elena.
- Elena Michaels - Female werewolf and friend of Paige.
- Eve Levine - Witch, Aspicio Half-demon and mother of Savannah. Now dead.
- Esus - Druid deity. God of woodland and water.
- The Fates - Deities in charge of the afterlife (see Moirai)
- Jaime Vegas - Necromancer
- Jeremy Danvers - Pack's Alpha Werewolf
- John - Vampire also known as Hans.
- Julie Aiken - Witch and younger sister of Wendy
- Lionel St Cloud - Head of St Cloud Cabal
- Natasha - Ghost vampire.
- Robert Vasic - Half-demon, husband of Talia and stepfather of Adam.
- Ronald - Vampire.
- Sean Nast - Son of Kristof Nast and Savannah's half-brother.
- Talia Vasic - Mother of Adam and Wife of Robert.
- Thomas Nast - Head of Nast Cabal.
- Wendy Aiken - Witch

=== Death Toll ===
- Dana MacArthur - Witch, Daughter of Randy MacArthur
- Jacob - Son of Griffin
- Matthew Tucker - 19-year-old son of Lionel St Cloud's personal assistant
- Everett Weber - Druid and Cabal Computer specialist. Executed by Cabals after being found (incorrectly) guilty of attacks on Cabal children.
- Joey Nast - Grandson of Thomas Nast. Killed outside courthouse after Everett's execution.
- Tyler Boyd - 17-year-old son of Boyd Cabal CEO
- Stephen St Cloud - Son of Lionel St Cloud
- Edward - Vampire lover of the now deceased Natasha, both immortality questers.

== Allusions/references to other works ==
- Kelley Armstrong says the inspiration for the Cabals was "a cross between the Mafia and a corporation, kind of a tongue in cheek poke at corporate North America."
- Jaime is looking for a copy of Christine by Stephen King when she is attacked by copies of 'Salem's Lot and the Iliad.
- Mentioned obliquely as "that damned writer" (p. 302), Anne Rice and The Vampire Chronicles are blamed for the New Orleans vampires considering themselves to be 'special'.
- Michael Corleone of The Godfather movies is held up as a comparison to Lucas' own position within the Cortez cabal.

== Allusions/references to actual history, geography and current science ==
- Esus, known in this novel as the god of woodland and water, was a Gaulish god known from two monumental statues and a line in Lucan's Bellum civile.
- The World Trade Center in New York City, which was one of the foci of the September 11, 2001 attacks is referred to (p. 240) as the home of the Nast Cabal's New York Office:

"Until last month, the Nasts' New York office was in the World Trade Center."
"Did they lose-?"
"Twenty-seven people, out of a staff of thirty-five..."

== Awards and nominations ==
- Romantic Time Reviewers Choice Award 'Best Contemporary Paranormal' 2004

== Critical reception ==
- "Set in a supernatural but credible underworld of industrial baron sorcerers and psychologically crippled witches... breakneck action is tempered by deep psychological insights, intense sensuality and considerable humor." - Publishers Weekly
- "Dark, snappy, and consistently entertaining... Armstrong never loses the balance between Paige's sardonic narration, the wonderfully absurd supporting characters and the nicely girlie touches that add a little lightness to the murder and mayhem... There's never anything that could be described as a dull moment or filler for nearly 600 pages, that's quite an achievement. The series, in general, is developing into something more interesting and less predictable with every installment." -SF Crow's Nest
- "Armstrong's world is dangerous and fun, her voice crisp and funny... a solidly engaging novel." -Contra Costa
- "Not to be missed. The action is fantastic and the drama is very intense." -Huntress Reviews
- "I found a lot to like in the humor and diversity of Armstrong's world." -Denver Post
- "Industrial Magic is a book not to be missed. The action is fantastic and the drama is very intense. Kelly Armstrong creates such fun characters that really jump off the pages. The book is fast paced with a lot of unexpected turns. Like the other books in the series, I wanted more after reading Industrial magic." -SFsite.com
- "One of Armstrong's strengths is the creation of plausible characters, which is a real bonus in a series based on the premise that there are supernatural beings walking and working beside us in our contemporary world. Industrial Magic is a page turner and very hard to put down." -Bookslut.com
