= 13 (Armstrong novel) =

2012 novel by Kelley Armstrong

- paper back
- Author: Kelley Armstrong
- Language: English
- Series: Women of the Otherworld
- Genre: Fantasy, Romance, Adventure
- Publisher: Orbit Books
- Publication date: 2012
- Publication place: Canada
- Media type: Print (Hardcover & Paperback)
- ISBN: 978-1841498034
- Preceded by: Spellbound
- Website: kelleyarmstrong.com/thirteen/

13 is the finale novel in Women of the Otherworld series by Kelley Armstrong. It was published in 2012 by Orbit.

== Plot ==
13 centers around Savannah Levine, who is experiencing a new and dark magic inside of her that gives her abilities that seem foreign and thrilling. She cannot tell if this ability is a blessing, or a curse. Meanwhile, the nefarious cult, known as the Supernatural Liberation Movement is determined to expose Supernaturals for what they are, destroying them in their path—and this plan affects all types of supernaturals, from demons, to witches, to vampires. On the eve of the battle between the Otherworld and Supernatural Liberation Movement, the major supernaturals must come together to fight for their lives and for the existence of the Otherworld.

== Reception ==
Dear Author gave the book a "B" rating, writing that "Overall, despite some issues, I found Thirteen to be a satisfying conclusion to the Otherworld universe. (On the adult side anyway)." The Library Journal also reviewed the work.
