= Waking the Witch (novel) =

2010 novel by Kelley Armstrong

- Cover of Waking the Witch
- Author: Kelley Armstrong
- Language: English
- Series: Women of the Otherworld
- Genre: Urban fantasy
- Publisher: Dutton Penguin
- Publication date: July 27, 2010
- Publication place: United States
- Media type: Print (hardcover)
- Pages: 320 pp
- ISBN: 978-0-525-95178-0
- Preceded by: Frostbitten
- Followed by: Spellbound

Waking the Witch is the eleventh novel in Women of the Otherworld series by Kelley Armstrong.

== Plot ==
Savannah, eager to prove her worth, volunteers to investigate the mysterious deaths of three young women in a nearby factory town. The initial findings point to mundane causes, but Savannah senses something amiss. Savannah discovers strange markings and ritualistic elements surrounding the victims, indicating otherworldly involvement. Her investigation leads her to a hidden underground cult practicing voodoo-infused rituals. While investigating, Savannah experiences strange interruptions and unsettling occurrences, including unsettling dreams and visions. The Shadow's presence intensifies, leaving chilling messages and objects. Leah O'Donnell, the sister of one of the victims, approaches Savannah for help, believing something more sinister is at play. Leah’s determination and insight prove invaluable to Savannah's investigation.

Savannah's powers become erratic and unstable, seemingly influenced by the Shadow's presence. Her control over her magic weakens, threatening her safety and the investigation. Jesse Aanes, the brother of another victim, is murdered while pursuing his own investigation, raising the stakes and intensifying the danger. Savannah suspects the Shadow is responsible. Savannah and Adam uncover a connection between the cult and a powerful shaman who seeks to harness the town's ancient magic for his own twisted purposes. The shaman intends to use the victims' souls as fuel for a ritual that will grant him immense power.

Haunted by the shadow, Savannah seeks guidance and support from Paige and Lucas. They reveal the truth about her parents and the source of her unstable magic, warning her of the dangers she faces. Savannah, Adam, and Leah confront the shaman at his ritual site, a hidden location within the factory town. A fierce battle ensues, with Savannah struggling to control her erratic magic and ward off the Shadow's influence. The Shadow's true identity is revealed, a powerful demon, bound to the shaman and seeking to exploit his ritual for their own gain. The demon was the one responsible for the deaths and had been tormenting Savannah to weaken her.

Faced with the demon's power, Savannah realizes that relying solely on her own strength will not suffice. She must learn to trust and rely on others, particularly Adam and Leah, to truly defeat the threat. Savannah, Adam, and Leah join forces, using their combined skills and courage to overcome the demon. Savannah learns to control her magic, harnessing its full potential to defeat the demon and protect the town from further harm. The shaman is apprehended, and the town is safe. Savannah realizes the importance of working with others and relying on her guardians' guidance. She decides to remain with the agency, vowing to use her powers responsibly and continue honing her skills under their watchful eyes.

Savannah emerges from her first solo case a changed witch, stronger and more mature. She has learned valuable lessons about trust, responsibility, and the importance of asking for help. The final ends with her embracing her new role within the agency, ready to embrace the challenges and adventures that lie ahead.

== Characters ==
=== Main characters ===
- Savannah Levine - A young witch, finds herself under the protection of two powerful witches, Paige Winterbourne and Lucas Cortez.
- Adam Vasic - An Exustio half-demon, serves as a member of the Interracial Council, a group that bridges the gap between humans and supernatural beings.

=== Other characters ===
- Jesse Aanes - A skilled tracker, aids Savannah in her investigations.
- Michael Kennedy - The powerful warlock, becomes Savannah's mentor and love interest.
- Paige Winterbourne - A revered witch, serves as Savannah's guardian and a source of wisdom.
- Leah O'Donnell - A skeptical detective, is drawn into the supernatural world through Savannah's case.
- Eve Levine - Savannah's deceased mother, plays a significant role in the story.
