= Personal Demon =

2008 novel by Kelley Armstrong

- First edition (Canada)
- Author: Kelley Armstrong
- Cover artist: Dominic Harman
- Language: English
- Series: Women of the Otherworld
- Genre: Urban fantasy
- Publisher: Bantam Spectra (United States); Random House (Canada)
- Publication date: March 25, 2008
- Publication place: Canada
- Media type: Print (Hardcover)
- Pages: 371
- ISBN: 978-1-84149-695-5
- OCLC: 181927462
- Preceded by: No Humans Involved
- Followed by: Living with the Dead

Personal Demon, a fantasy novel published in 2008, is the eighth book in the Women of the Otherworld series written by Canadian author Kelley Armstrong. It is the first novel in the series to have more than one narrator and the first to include a male narrator.

== Summary ==
Half-demon tabloid reporter Hope Adams has a secret. Like full demons, she loves chaos. She thrives on it. She needs it most of the time, Hope feeds the hunger by helping the interracial council. But it's never enough. So when Benicio Cortez offers her a job infiltrating a gang of young supernaturals, she thinks she's found the perfect solution.

== Plot ==
Hope Adams, an Expiso half-demon, works as a tabloid journalist for True News. Her life is a whirlwind of chaos, fueled by her innate ability to sense supernatural disturbances and her thirst for the thrill of the story. Benicio Cortez, the powerful CEO of the Cortez cabal, approaches Hope with a proposition: to infiltrate and investigate a rebellious gang of young supernatural beings led by Guy Benoit, known as the Children of the Storm. Hope, bound by a debt to the Cortez family, reluctantly agrees, torn between her desire for chaos and the promise of a hefty payday. Lucas Cortez, Benicio's son and a powerful sorcerer, disapproves of his father's decision to involve Hope. He sees the rebels as misguided, not inherently evil, and fears their potential for destruction. Hope begins her investigation, using her charm and chaotic energy to infiltrate the rebel group. She develops a dangerous attraction to Jaz, a charismatic vampire member of the Children of the Storm, finding a kindred spirit in his defiance and thirst for freedom.

Karl Marsten, a werewolf thief with a complex past and a debt to Hope, arrives in Miami to help her. He is suspicious of the Cortez family, sensing a hidden agenda behind Benicio's offer. Hope, torn between her duty to the Cortez family and her growing feelings for Jaz, becomes increasingly aware of the rebel group's desperation and the desperation of their cause. Two members of the Children of the Storm are kidnapped, seemingly by the Cortez Cabal, fueling suspicion and animosity towards the powerful family. Hope, torn between her loyalty to both parties, feels the pressure mounting. She discovers the rebels are planning a desperate attack on the Cortez headquarters. Karl, after witnessing the chaos and brutality of the Cortez family, decides to aid the rebels, believing they are victims of a larger power struggle.

Lucas, having witnessed the growing tension and the threat of war between the rebels and the Cortez Cabal, arrives in Miami to intervene. He feels a growing empathy for the Children of the Storm, realizing their struggle is not entirely driven by chaos but a desire for freedom and self-determination. He tries to convince his father to reconsider his stance, but Benicio remains resolute, convinced that the rebels are a threat to the established order. Paige Winterbourne, a powerful sorceress and Lucas's ally, also joins Hope and Karl, sensing the looming chaos.

Hope discovers that the Cortez Cabal has been manipulating events, exploiting the rebels' desperation for their own gain. She realizes that Benicio is using their desperation as leverage in a power struggle with a rival cabal, the Obsidian Order, who are also manipulating events from the shadows. Hope confronts Benicio, challenging his ruthless methods and revealing his true intentions. Benicio, believing the rebels are a threat to his power, continues his manipulations, escalating the conflict.

Lucas, fueled by his growing empathy for the rebels and his desire to prevent a catastrophic war, aligns himself with Hope and Karl. The trio work together to expose Benicio's manipulation, hoping to prevent the escalating violence. Jaz, disillusioned by the discovery of his leader's true motives, joins them, seeking to protect his people from the chaos they are being forced into.

The Children of the Storm, fueled by their desperation and fury, launch a full-scale attack on the Cortez headquarters. Hope, Karl, Lucas, and Paige try to stop the attack, caught in a crossfire of warring supernaturals. They find themselves facing both the Children of the Storm and the Obsidian Order, who are using the chaos to further their own agenda.

The demon continues, Hope is forced to make a pivotal choice between her allegiance to the Cortez family and her growing loyalty to the rebels and Jaz. She must decide whether to embrace the chaos that defines her nature or to fight for a future where both sides can coexist peacefully. The fate of the supernatural world hangs in the balance, and Hope's decision will determine whether it will be consumed by chaos or find a path towards harmony.

== Characters ==
=== Major characters ===
- Hope Adams - Expiso half-demon. Works for interracial council and as a tabloid reporter.
- Lucas Cortez - Sorcerer and future heir of Cortez cabal. Lives in Portland and runs an agency helping supernaturals with wife Paige Winterbourne and adopted daughter Savannah Levine.
- Karl Marsten - Hereditary werewolf. Extremely wealthy professional thief and has recently joined the Pack.
- Paige Winterbourne - Witch and member of the interracial council. Ex-leader of the American Coven, currently works with husband Lucas and adopted daughter Savannah at their agency to help supernaturals.
- Benicio Cortez - Sorcerer and CEO of Cortez cabal. Father of Hector, William, Carlos and Lucas

=== Minor characters ===
- Savannah Levine - Witch. Adopted daughter of Lucas and Paige.
- Guy Benoit - Sorcerer. Leader of rebel gang of supernaturals in Miami.
- Jasper "Jaz" Haig - Shapeshifter (previously unknown race). Member of rebel gang in Miami. Brother of Sonny.
- Jason "Sonny" Haig - Shapeshifter (previously unknown race). Member of rebel gang in Miami. Brother of Jaz.
- Hector Cortez- Sorcerer, executive in Cortez cabal, son of Benicio.
- William Cortez- Sorcerer, executive in Cortez cabal, son of Benicio.
- Carlos Cortez- Sorcerer, executive in Cortez cabal, son of Benicio.
- Troy Morgan - Tempestras half-demon bodyguard to Benicio Cortez
- Griffin - Ferratus half-demon bodyguard of Benicio Cortez

== Release details ==
- Released in hardback in March 2008.
- Due for release in paperback October 2008
