= Bitten (novel) =

2001 fantasy novel by Kelley Armstrong

- First Edition (publ, Random House, Canada)
- Author: Kelley Armstrong
- Cover artist: Dominic Harman
- Language: English
- Series: Women of the Otherworld
- Genre: Urban fantasy
- Published: Viking Adult (United States), Little, Brown & co. (U.K.), Random House (Canada)
- Publication date: October 2, 2001
- Publication place: Canada
- Media type: Print (hardback and paperback) and audio book (cassette)
- Pages: 400 (hardcover); 384 (paperback)
- ISBN: 978-0-670-89471-0
- Followed by: Stolen

Bitten is a 2001 fantasy novel by Canadian writer Kelley Armstrong. It is the first book in the Women of the Otherworld series, and her first novel.

== Premise ==
Elena Michaels is the only known female werewolf, but she grows tired of spending her life pursuing rogue werewolves and trying to control her temper and violence. She decides to leave her Pack and live in Toronto as a human, but the Pack leader calls in a favor, which leads Elena to try to help quell an uprising.

== Concept and creation ==
Armstrong says Bitten was inspired by an X-Files episode on werewolves. She had the idea to portray werewolves as other than "bloodthirsty, ravening beasts" and quickly wrote a short story about a young woman who becomes a werewolf to present to her writing group. Eventually, Armstrong fleshed out the short story into a novel that became Bitten.

== Release details ==
- First released in the U.S. by Viking Press in September 2001, in hardcover.
- Released in trade paperback in January 2003 by Plume.
- Released in mass market paperback in August 2004 by Plume.

== Awards and nominations ==
- Nominated Best First Novel by the International Horror Guild

== Screen adaptations ==
For a while, there was discussion of making a film adaptation of the novel. Angelina Jolie was approached to play the central role of Elena. A script is still floating around for it.

On 23 August 2012, Space announced that a full-season TV adaptation of Bitten would commence production in spring 2013. On 9 March 2013, it was announced that Laura Vandervoort would be cast as Elena Michaels. The 13-part series was scheduled to premiere in fall 2013 but was pushed back and premiered in January 2014. On 12 August 2014, the full first season was released in the United States on Blu-ray and DVD.
