= Haunted (Armstrong novel) =

2005 fantasy novel written by Kelley Armstrong

- First edition (Canada)
- Author: Kelley Armstrong
- Language: English
- Series: Women of the Otherworld
- Genre: Urban fantasy
- Publisher: Bantam Books (United States); Seal Books (Canada)
- Publication date: May 31, 2005
- Publication place: Canada
- Media type: Print (Hardcover & Paperback) & Audio Book (Cassette)
- Pages: 495 (paperback edition)
- ISBN: 1-84149-341-4 (paperback edition)
- OCLC: 57574316
- Preceded by: Industrial Magic
- Followed by: Broken

Haunted is a 2005 fantasy novel written by Kelley Armstrong. The fifth book in the Women of the Otherworld series, it features the witch Paige Winterbourne.

== Plot ==
Eve Levine, a half-demon, black witch, and devoted mother, stuck in the afterlife for three years, yearning to connect with her daughter, Savannah, now raised by Paige Winterbourne and Lucas Cortez. The Fates, mythical beings who granted Eve a life-altering favor in the past, call in their debt. Eve is tasked with capturing the Nix, a powerful demi-demon who escaped from hell, capable of amplifying dark desires and pushing people to commit murder.

The Fates warn Eve of the Nix’s cunning and history of driving hunters mad. Eve, initially hesitant to leave Savannah unprotected, reluctantly accepts the mission. She reunites with her lover, Kristof Nast, a powerful sorcerer who dwells in the afterlife, and Trsiel, a skeptical but powerful angel assigned by the Fates to aid their quest. Together, they begin researching the Nix, uncovering a trail of chaos and bloodshed spanning centuries.

They soon realize the Nix isn’t just a murderer, but a collector of despair and anguish, feeding on the emotional fallout of the crimes she orchestrates. Eve, using her unique connection to the mortal world, enlists the help of Jaime Vegas, a gifted witch and friend of Paige, to investigate the Nix's past victims and uncover a pattern. They discover the Nix preys on individuals wrestling with inner turmoil, amplifying their darkest desires and manipulating them to kill. Eve fears that Savannah, grappling with the loss of her mother and the complexities of her heritage, might be a potential target, forcing her to confront the possibility of losing her daughter forever.

The trio follows the Nix’s trail, facing increasingly dangerous obstacles and traps set by the cunning demon. Each encounter pushes Eve closer to her own darkness, testing her morals and resolve. Kristof’s unwavering love and Trsiel’s burgeoning respect for Eve help ground her, reminding her of the light she fights for. The stakes rise dramatically when the Nix targets someone close to Paige and Lucas, drawing Savannah into the crossfire. Eve is forced to reveal her presence to her daughter, assuring her safety while grappling with the bittersweet reunion. This revelation strengthens their bond but exposes Savannah to the dangers of Eve’s world.

As Eve nears the Nix, she uncovers a devastating truth: the demon’s escape from hell was orchestrated by a powerful, unknown entity seeking to sow chaos in both the mortal and supernatural realms. This revelation adds another layer of urgency to their mission, as capturing the Nix becomes crucial to preventing a catastrophic war.

The final confrontation with the Nix takes place in a location steeped in magical significance, a nexus of power that amplifies the demon’s abilities. A desperate battle ensues, testing the limits of Eve’s magic and pushing Kristof and Trsiel to their absolute limits. Eve realizes that defeating the Nix conventionally is impossible. The demon feeds on chaos, and any victory fueled by anger or aggression will only make her stronger.

In a moment of heartbreaking clarity, Eve discovers the only way to truly defeat the Nix is to make a monumental sacrifice: she must ascend to become an Ascended Angel, a being of pure light who can neutralize the Nix's darkness without succumbing to it. However, this ascension means leaving her physical form behind, separating her from Kristof and preventing any further physical contact with Savannah. Torn between her love for Kristof and her duty to protect both Savannah and the world, Eve makes an agonizing choice. She embraces the ascension, her love for Kristof and Savannah becoming the fuel for her transformation. The Nix, starved of the chaos she thrives on, is ultimately vanquished, drawn back into the depths of hell.

Eve, now an Ascended Angel, watches over Savannah from afar, her presence a comforting whisper in the young woman's life. Kristof, heartbroken but understanding, continues his work in the afterlife, finding solace in their shared memories and the knowledge that their sacrifice saved the world. The ending is bittersweet, a testament to the complexities of love, sacrifice, and the enduring bonds that transcend even death itself.

== Characters ==
=== Main characters ===
- Eve Levine - Witch, Aspicio Half-demon and mother of Savannah. Now dead.
- The Fates - Deities in charge of the afterlife (see Moirai).
- Jaime Vegas - A necromancer with a troubled past.
- Kristof Nast - Sorcerer father of Savannah. Now dead.
- Lucas Cortez - Sorcerer Lawyer and husband of Paige Winterbourne, Son of Benicio Cortez and heir of Cortez Cabal.
- The Nix - A enigmatic and powerful Demi-demon.
- Paige Winterbourne - Witch and Former Head of American Coven. Wife of Lucas Cortez.
- Savannah Levine - Fifteen-year-old witch and ward of Paige Winterbourne and daughter of Eve Levine (Witch & Aspicio half Demon) & Kristof Nast (Sorcerer & heir to Nast Cabal).
- Trsiel - Angel charged with the task of assisting Eve.

== Reception ==
Haunted was included in Publishers Weekly's best-sellers list in the mass market and paperback categories.
