= Broken (Armstrong novel) =

2006 novel by Kelley Armstrong

- First edition (Canada)
- Author: Kelley Armstrong
- Language: English
- Series: Women of the Otherworld
- Genre: Urban fantasy
- Publisher: Bantam Books (United States); Seal Books (Canada)
- Publication date: April 25, 2006
- Publication place: Canada
- Media type: Print (Hardcover & Paperback) & Audio Book (Cassette)
- Pages: 480
- ISBN: 0-553-58818-4
- OCLC: 67231322
- Dewey Decimal: 813/.6 22
- LC Class: PS3551.R4678 B76 2006
- Preceded by: Haunted
- Followed by: No Humans Involved

Broken is a fantasy novel by written by Kelley Armstrong. It is the sixth in her Women of the Otherworld series and has the return of Elena Michaels as narrator.

== Plot ==
The half-demon Xavier required a favor: the retrieval of Jack the Ripper's From Hell letter, stolen from British police files and now in the possession of a shady collector. While infiltrating the collector's mansion, Elena, a member of the Pack, inadvertently triggered a spell bound to the letter, unleashing a portal that tore open a gateway to Victorian London's nether regions. Chaos erupted as thieving vampires, killer rats, and unstoppable zombies poured forth. The Pack found themselves trapped and outnumbered, fighting for their lives amidst the horrifying creatures. Adding to the turmoil, Elena's pregnancy with Clay's twins made her more vulnerable than ever. The situation demanded immediate action, for if the portal remained open, the nether regions' horrors would engulf the entire city.

Elena was apprehensive about her pregnancy. Being a werewolf, she had no knowledge of how her unique nature would affect her unborn child. This unprecedented situation left her uncertain and filled her with unease. Clay and Jeremy, consumed by concern, had implemented various restrictions on her activities, which Elena understood but also found stifling. She received an unexpected proposition from Xavier Reese. He offered valuable information regarding a rogue mutt that the Pack had been pursuing relentlessly. In exchange, he sought their assistance in stealing an ancient artifact from a powerful sorcerer, the From Hell letter. This proposal intrigued Elena. It presented an opportunity to escape the confines of her current situation while potentially benefiting the Pack.

Elena weighed the risks and rewards of Xavier's offer. Joining forces with him could provide her with insights into her pregnancy and perhaps even lead to a solution for her concerns. However, she knew that aligning herself with an unpredictable rogue like Xavier came with its own set of dangers.

The sinister deal sealed, Jeremy swiftly claimed the coveted letter, his heart pounding with a mix of anticipation and trepidation. Unbeknownst to them, their departure from the secluded meeting spot unleashed a horrifying consequence. Clay's careless act of squashing a mosquito and smearing Elena's blood on the parchment triggered an inter-dimensional portal, a gateway to a realm lost in time.

This activates an inter-dimensional portal emerged a horde of undead creatures, their bodies decaying and their eyes burning with an eerie glow. These Victorian era zombies, remnants of a forgotten era, bore an unquenchable thirst for Elena and the life she carried within her. The Pack, ever the protectors, rallied to her defense, their claws and fangs bared against the relentless onslaught. However, the zombies possessed an unnatural resilience, returning time and again despite their best efforts.

A sinister disease spread through the city. Cholera ravaged the Toronto water supply, infecting countless citizens. Rats, driven by a deadly ailment, became carriers of pestilence, terrorizing the streets. Unexpected disappearances plagued the modern-day population, their fates sealed within the gaping maw of the portal. Whispers spread that the notorious Jack the Ripper had been unwittingly released upon an unsuspecting public, leaving a trail of bloody carnage in his wake.

== Characters ==
- Elena Michaels - Pack werewolf, Clayton's mate, pregnant with Clayton's children.
- Clayton Danvers - Pack werewolf, foster son of Jeremy Danvers, top fighter in the pack, mate of Elena.
- Jeremy Danvers - Alpha werewolf of the Pack, foster father of Clayton Danvers.
- Antonio Sorrentino - Pack werewolf, best friend of Jeremy.
- Nicholas "Nick" Sorrentino - Pack werewolf, best friend of Clayton.
- Jaime Vegas - Necromancer, works in Hollywood as a "fake" necromancer on TV, but is a real necromancer. Has a crush on Jeremy Danvers.
- Katherine Danvers - Daughter of Elena and Clay, born at the end of the story.
- Logan Danvers - Son of Elena and Clay, born at the end of the story).
- Xavier Reese - Half-demon father was an Evanidus demon with teleportation abilities limited to approximately 10 feet. Gets Elena to agree to steal the "Ripper letter" by giving her information on a rogue mutt. Elena met him in Stolen book number two in the series when she was captured. Xavier saved her twice while she was imprisoned, once from being killed, and once from being raped by guards, and he comes back to get her to return the favor.
- Zoe - Vampire who helps Elena deal with her zombie problem.

== Release details ==
- Published May 2006 in paperback by Bantam Spectra in the United States.
- Published the same month in paperback by Seal Books in Canada (ISBN 0770429793).
- Published the same month in paperback by Time Warner Orbit in the United Kingdom (ISBN 1841493422).
