= Stolen (Armstrong novel) =

2002 novel by Kelley Armstrong

- First edition (publ. Random House of Canada)
- Author: Kelley Armstrong
- Cover artist: Dominic Harman
- Language: English
- Series: Women of the Otherworld
- Genre: Urban fantasy
- Published: Random House
- Publication date: December 24, 2002
- Publication place: Canada
- Media type: Print (Hardcover & Paperback) & Audio Book (Cassette)
- Pages: 532 (paperback edition)
- ISBN: 0-7515-3241-X (paperback edition)
- OCLC: 52324740
- Preceded by: Bitten
- Followed by: Dime Store Magic

Stolen is a fantasy novel by Canadian author Kelley Armstrong. It is the second book in the Women of the Otherworld series. The book was initially released by Random House of Canada on December 24, 2002 before being released in the United States by Viking Press in May 2003. The sequel to Bitten, Stolen follows Elena Michaels as she investigates the threat of a billionaire who is collecting supernatural beings.

== Plot ==
Werewolf Elena Michaels lives with her boyfriend Clay and their Pack on an estate in New York. After coming across a post on believe.com promising proof of the existence of werewolves, Elena travels to Pittsburgh to meet with Paige and Ruth Winterbourne. The Winterbournes are witches and made the post to lure Elena to Pennsylvania, where they could talk to her about billionaire Tyrone Winsloe, who other supernatural populations have been threatened by. Elena finds it difficult to believe their pitch. That night, she is followed by a man with military training while on a run. While she manages to evade him, his colleagues capture her and the Winterbournes. Elena kills one of the men and Ruth casts a spell that temporarily traps the other, allowing them to escape. In the morning, Elena contacts Jeremy, her Pack's leader, and they, along with Clay, attend a meeting of the Inter-racial Council. There, they learn about a shaman who was kidnapped by Winsloe and his men. He is still being imprisoned but used astral projection to contact the Inter-racial Council.

Jeremy decides to leave the meeting, only interested in getting involved if his Pack is in danger. That night, Jeremy, Clay, and Elena are attacked by a group of Winsloe's men, who they kill. The Pack is suspicious because the only people who knew they were in the area were the members of the Council. The following day, when they arrive at the meeting, they do so with the head of one of the men in a bag. They decline any offer to align themselves with the Council and leave. On the way home, Elena is kidnapped from her car and taken to Winsloe's compound. There, she meets a number of other supernatural beings: Leah, a half-demon; Sondra, a compound worker; Savannah, a teenage witch who is followed by poltergeist activity; and Dr. Carmichael, the compound's doctor. She also finds that Ruth has been kidnapped as well, though she is later killed. Sondra becomes obsessed with becoming a werewolf and injects herself with some of Elena's saliva, and has to be taken to the infirmary after her body reacts as if she had been bitten. There, she kills Dr. Carmichael. Meanwhile, Winsloe takes an interest in Elena, inviting her on hunts, where she learns other prisoners are being killed. Later, Winsloe brings her photographs that he claims are of Clay, who is now dead. A system malfunction provides the opportunity for Elena, Sondra, Leah, and Savannah to attempt escape. Sondra is killed by guards, while Leah and Savannah accidentally get left behind. Outside, Elena meets Clay, who is alive, and the pair rejoin Jeremy and the rest of their Pack in New Brunswick, Canada. They devise a plan to free the others. During the rescue, it is revealed that Leah was responsible for the apparent poltergeist activity when she tries and fails to kidnap Savannah. Clay and Elena track Winsloe and kill him.

== Characters ==
- Elena Michaels, the world's only known female werewolf
- Clay Danvers, Elena's mate and the werewolf who turned her
- Jeremy Danvers, Alpha werewolf and leader of Elena and Clay's Pack
- Paige Winterbourne, witch
- Ruth Winterbourne, witch and head of the American Coven
- Leah O'Donnell, half-demon who Elena meets at the compound
- Savannah Levine, teenage witch who Elena meets at the compound
- Sondra Bauer, compound employee who becomes obsessed with becoming a werewolf
- Dr. Carmichael, the compound's doctor
- Tyrone Winsloe, billionaire and startup founder who has been collecting supernaturals to harness their power for himself

== Reception ==
Stolen garnered generally positive reactions from reviewers. Ruth Myles from the Calgary Herald called it "enjoyable," but did not think it lived up to its potential. Katy Miller from Orlando Sentinel and Karin Slaughter praised Armstrong's portrayal of Elena as sympathetic and strong despite her impulsivity and protectiveness over her Pack. A reviewer from whichbook.net described it as an "exciting mix of off beat humor, a chase and total fantasy." Toronto Star's Nancy Wigston wrote that it "veers between clever, scholarly distinctions among different sorts of magical powers, and a lot of action movie-style sex and violence," though it lacks tension "about whether the 'good' werewolves and their new associates are going to win."
