= Living with the Dead (novel) =

2008 novel by Kelley Armstrong

- First edition (US)
- Author: Kelley Armstrong
- Language: English
- Series: Women of the Otherworld
- Genre: Urban fantasy
- Publisher: Bantam Books
- Publication date: October 21, 2008
- Publication place: Canada
- Media type: Print (Hardcover & Paperback)
- Pages: 384 pp (hardcover); 560 pp (paperback)
- ISBN: 0-553-80664-5
- Preceded by: Personal Demon
- Followed by: Frostbitten

Living with the Dead is the ninth novel in Women of the Otherworld series by Kelley Armstrong.

== Premise ==
When Robyn Peltier, a very human PR professional is framed for murder, the two people most determined to clear her name are tabloid reporter Hope Adams, and necromancer homicide detective John Findlay. Robyn finds herself in the heart of a world she never knew existed—and which she is safer knowing nothing about..."

== Plot ==
Robyn, still grieving her husband's death, struggles to find her footing in Los Angeles. Her job with Portia Kane proves both challenging and surprisingly amusing as she navigates the world of celebrity and constant drama. Portia Kane is brutally murdered, leaving Robyn as the prime suspect due to a witness placing her at the scene. Robyn, shocked and terrified, goes on the run with limited support from Hope. Hope, initially skeptical, investigates the murder and discovers a bizarre connection to Robyn's husband's death. She realizes that Portia Kane's death wasn't a random act of violence, but part of a larger, more sinister conflict.

Hope uncovers the presence of the Otherworld cabals in Los Angeles, their influence stretching far beyond what she could have imagined. The cabals, vying for control, have a vested interest in Portia's death and Robyn's involvement. Karl, using his knowledge of the Otherworld, warns Robyn and Hope about the dangers they're facing. He explains that they have stumbled into a war between the cabals, and Robyn's connection to Portia Kane makes her a pawn in their game. As the body count rises, Robyn is forced to face the truth about her husband's death and its connection to the Otherworld. She discovers that he was caught in the middle of the conflict, leading to his untimely demise.

The once-ordinary world, Robyn, consumed by the knowledge of her husband's true fate and the machinations of the Otherworld, struggles with the weight of her newfound reality. While grieving, she also needs to find a way to clear her name and survive. Hope, determined to protect her friend, relies on her knowledge of the Otherworld and Karl's guidance to navigate the dangerous situation. She must strategize a way to protect Robyn without revealing the truth to the police, who continue to hunt her down. Robyn becomes entangled in the fight between the two cabals, forced to choose sides. The seemingly harmless and mundane events in Robyn's life are revealed to be deliberate attempts to manipulate her by the cabals, who see her as a key to achieving their goals. The lines between the world of the living and the Otherworld begin to blur. Robyn experiences strange occurrences and encounters beings from the Otherworld, both dangerous and benevolent. Hope, with Karl's help, opens a path for Robyn to enter the Otherworld, offering a way to understand the situation and escape the pursuit of the cabals.

Initially apprehensive, Robyn, hesitant at first, decides to enter the Otherworld to seek answers and protect herself. She learns that her husband's death was a deliberate act, aimed at drawing her into the conflict and utilizing her for their purposes. In the Otherworld, Robyn encounters different beings and faces unimaginable challenges, battling both the dangers of the environment and the forces of the cabals. She discovers a hidden truth about Portia Kane's past and her involvement with the Otherworld. This revelation sheds light on Robyn's connection to the conflict and her importance to the cabals. As Robyn delves deeper into the world of the Otherworld, she encounters a powerful, ancient entity who holds the key to her survival and the fate of the cabals' war. This entity tests Robyn's resilience and forces her to confront her fears and vulnerabilities.

The twilight of a turbulent war, Robyn, having gained knowledge and strength in the Otherworld, is forced to make a critical decision that will affect the outcome of the war between the cabals. She must choose a side and fight for what she believes in, knowing the consequences will be far-reaching. Her decision sets off a chain of witches, leading to a choatic continues with the entity that holds the key to the conflict. Robyn, with the support of Hope and Karl, must use all her newfound strength and knowledge to defeat the entity and prevent the Otherworld from spilling over into the human world.

Emerging from the ethereal realm, Robyn, having emerged victorious from the conflict, returns to the human world with a newfound understanding of the Otherworld and her place in it. The cabals are weakened, their power diminished, as the human world is protected from the dangers of the Otherworld. Robyn, having lost her husband but gained a deeper understanding of life and death, finds a way to move forward with her life, carrying the knowledge of the Otherworld and the lessons she learned within her heart.

== Characters ==
- Savannah Levine - A young witch, is a central figure in the series, using her powers to protect her friends and family.
- Robyn Peltier - A human lawyer, finds herself drawn into the supernatural world after a reaching out to her best friend Hope for help after being set up for the murder of her client.
- John "Finn" Findlay - a necromancer with struggles with his dual nature and the responsibilities that come with it.
- Hope Adams - The chaos sensing half-demon
- Karl Marsten - The werewolf,
- Adele Morrissey - A clairvoyant who is at the center of the conflict
