= Elena Michaels =

Fictional character in novels by Kelley Armstrong

- Bitten character
- First appearance: "Summons" (1.01); January 11, 2014
- Last appearance: "Truth, Changes, Everything" (3.10); April 15, 2016
- Portrayed by: Laura Vandervoort

In-universe information
- Species: Werewolf
- Gender: Female
- Occupation: Photographer; Alpha of The Pack
- Family: Brendan Michaels (adoptive father); Lisa Michaels (adoptive mother); Roman Navikev (maternal grandfather); Konstantin Saranin (maternal uncle); Sasha Antonov (biological father); Natayla Navikev (biological mother); Katia Antonov (paternal half-sister); Alexei Antonov (paternal half-brother)
- Spouse: Clayton Danvers
- Significant other: Clayton Danvers: Philip McAdams (ex-boyfriend)
- Children: Kate Danvers, Logan Danvers

Elena Michaels is a fictional character in the Women of the Otherworld novel series. Elena is a pack werewolf who was bitten by her lover Clayton Danvers. Elena becomes Pack Alpha after Jeremy Danvers steps down. She first appeared in the novel Bitten (2001).

== Characterization ==
=== Early life ===
Elena's parents died in a car crash in 1973. She then moved from home to home. At first, the foster mothers chose her for her pretty blonde hair and blue eyes. After they realized they couldn't take care of a child as traumatized as Elena was, she was sent to another foster home. Due to the trauma she suffered, she refused to talk and spent many nights screaming. As she grew up, the foster fathers took notice of her for her innocence. They tended to come to her at night and sexually abuse her. As she reached her teen years, she toughened up a lot and started running track and field. She realized that they couldn't reach the Elena that was inside of her. They never touched her after this since they realized she was not an innocent child anymore.

=== Physical appearance ===
Elena is described as being a slender, tall woman with a "werewolf's typically athletic build", standing at around 5'10. Furthermore, she has blue eyes and white-blonde hair that is mid-back length. It is stated in the books that Elena has not worn makeup since the 1990s, but despite this she has "wholesome good looks" and people have stated that if she made an effort to fix herself up, she would be very beautiful. Contrary to the previous statement, others have said that Elena possesses a natural beauty and does not need any makeup.

When she is in her wolf form, she becomes a blonde wolf. Her wolf appearance is similar to that of a husky or another big dog.

=== Abilities ===
Elena is the world's only female werewolf. Like other werewolves, she has supernatural strength, speed, sight, and smell. She has the best sense of smell in her Pack and is usually the best tracker. Elena is also a skilled fighter.

=== Later years ===
Elena met Clayton Danvers at The University Of Toronto. She needed a job to fund her college years, and Clay suggested she could be his teacher's aide. What started as a friendship grew until they started dating, eventually becoming engaged. Clay didn't plan to fall in love with Elena the way he did but, panicked by the possibility that Jeremy Danvers, the Pack Alpha, was going to send her away, he reacted by biting her.

== Aftermath ==
When Clay bit Elena, he was banished from the pack by Jeremy. Elena lived for a year without any sense of what she was. She was told that she was a werewolf, but it took a long time for her to accept it. It took much longer for her to forgive Clay and realize she loved him.

== The beginning of a new era ==
=== Settling down ===
Elena eventually returns to Clay, and they try to make their relationship work again. She helps the pack and learns to live with Clay despite their differences.

In 2000, the American Werewolf Pack rejoin the Supernatural Council. There, Elena becomes close friends with people from other supernatural races. Amongst them:

- Paige Winterbourne - Witch
- Savannah Levine - Witch
- Jaime Vegas, born O'Casey - Necromancer
- Adam Vasic - Exustio Half-Demon
- Lucas Cortez - Sorcerer
- Hope Adams - Expisco Half-Demon.

Elena and her pack also gained another pack brother, Karl Marsten.

In September 2004, Elena gave birth to twins: Logan Nicholas Danvers and Katherine Natalya Danvers. As of winter 2008, the North American Pack Alpha, Jeremy Danvers, announced that Elena was to succeed him and be trained to take over his position when she was deemed ready. In 2009, Elena ascended to being Alpha; because, Jeremy was ready to step down, and thought she was ready for leadership.

== Television ==
In the television adaptation Bitten Elena is portrayed by Laura Vandervoort.
