= Rockton World's Fair =

Coordinates: 43.346°N 80.055°W

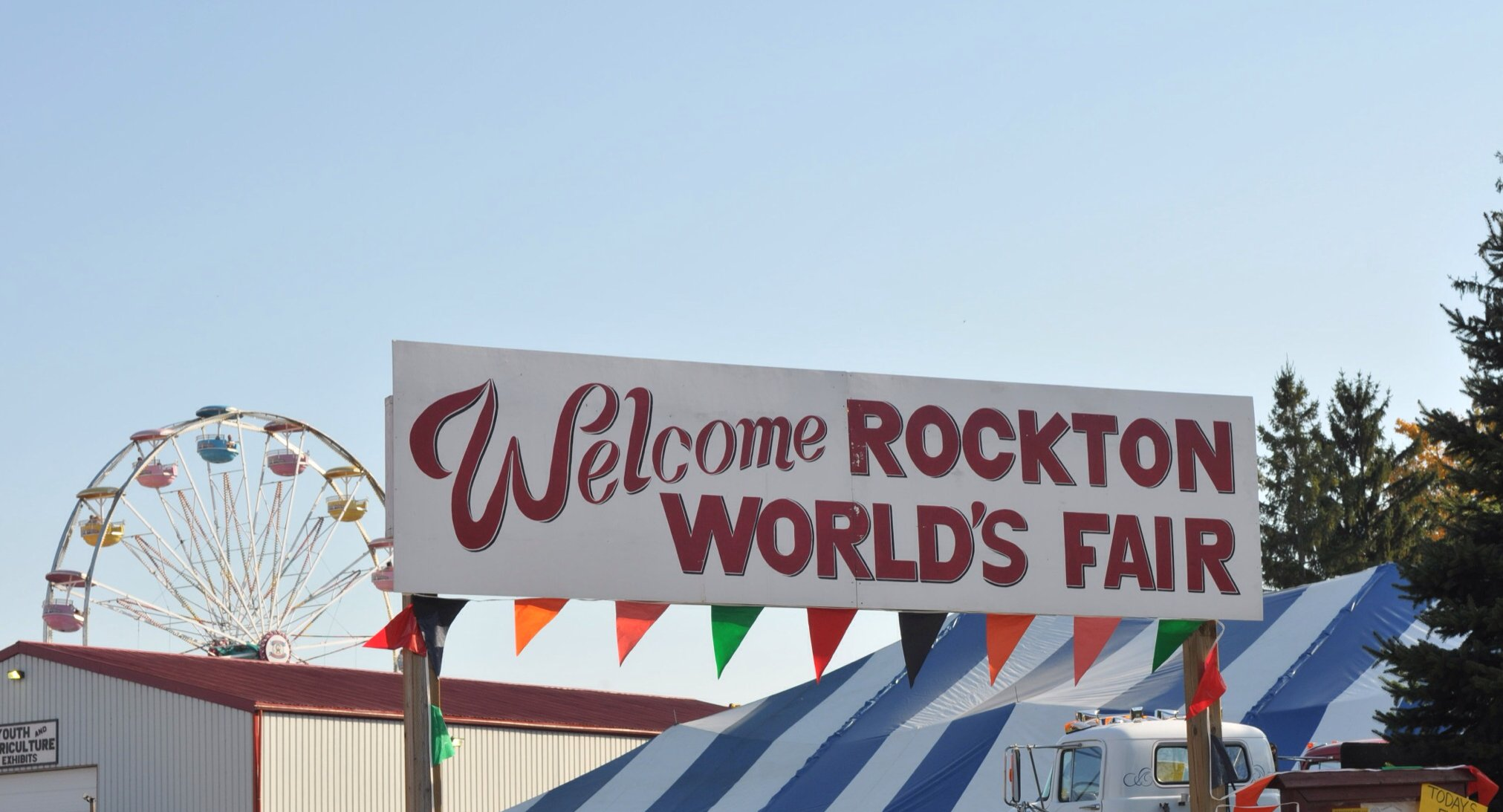
Welcome to the Rockton World's Fair

The Rockton World's Fair is an annual Thanksgiving weekend tradition in the community of Rockton, located in Hamilton, Ontario. It originated as the Beverly Agricultural Society Fair in 1852, and has been known as the World's Fair in Rockton or the Rockton World's Fair since 1878.

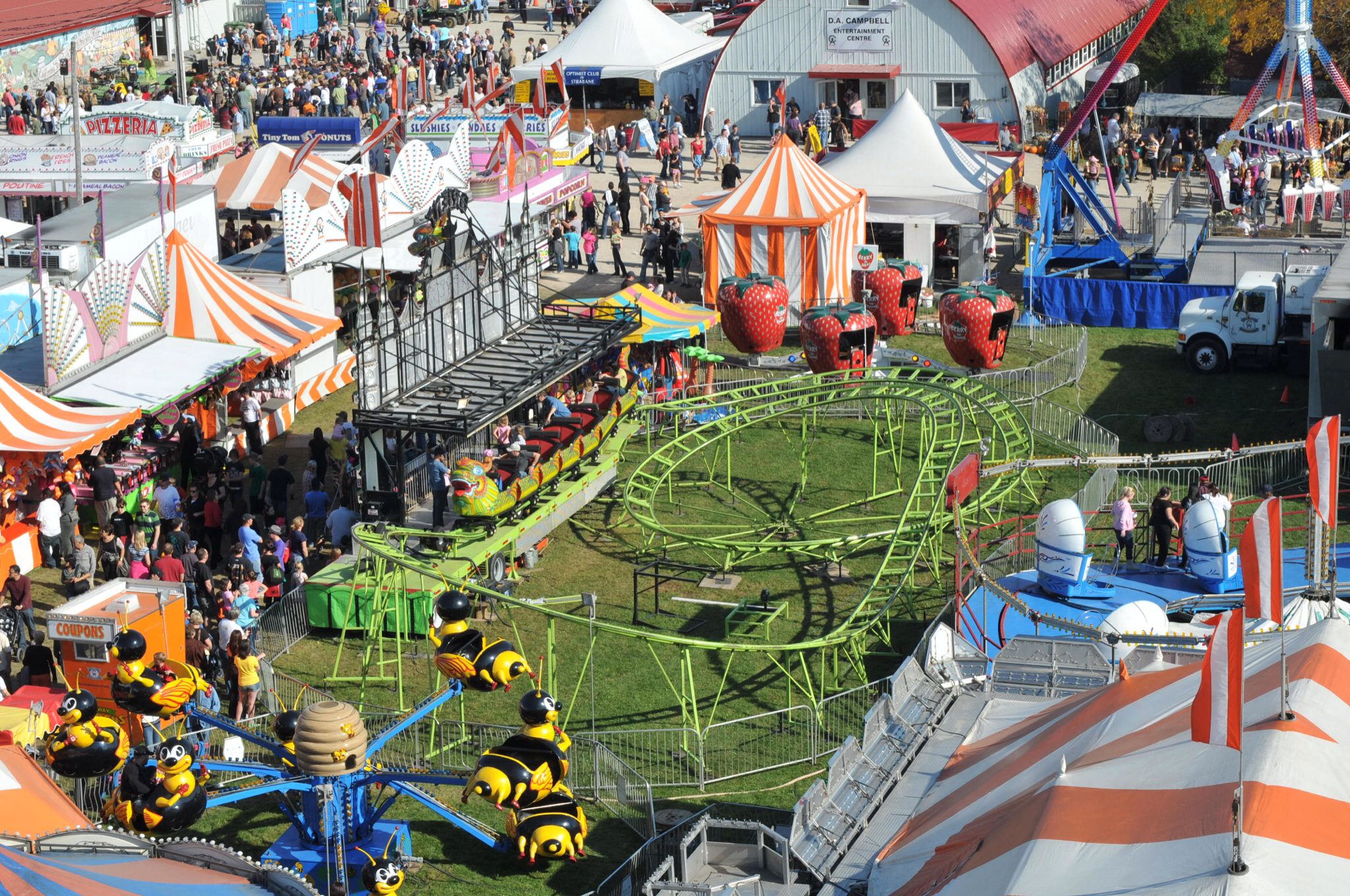
Overview, Rockton World's Fair

Other nearby communities sending exhibits & speakers to the event include: Puslinch, Greensville, Carlisle, Freelton, Lynden, Sheffield, Rockton, Clappison's Corners, Millgrove, Christie's Corners, Sheffield, Copetown, Kirkwall, Valens, Mountsberg, Westover and Troy.

No fair was held in 1917–18, 1942–44 nor 2020.
