= Chaotics =

Strategic business framework

CHAOTICS is a strategic business framework and platform for dealing with economic turbulence. Defined and developed in 2008 by marketing guru Philip Kotler of Northwestern University's Kellogg School of Management and global business strategy expert John Caslione of GCS Business Capital, LLC.

Based on the concept that the world economy has entered into a new economic era of uncertainty, chaotics provides methods to allow companies to live with increased risk and uncertainty in an age of heightened turbulence and its consequent chaos. This involves creating and implementing a set of new strategic behaviors defined by Kotler and Caslione as well as building an early warning system, a scenario construction system, and a quick response system to manage and market during recessions and other turbulent economic conditions.

Chaotics advocates creating systems that are more resilient than traditionally used in business. John Caslione notes that the world economy makes companies close linked and interdependent on each other. While this is a benefit in good economic times, this interdependence increases the damage during times of recession. Caslione views the traditional business cycle, of 5-7 years of upturn followed by a year of recession, to be a thing of the past, and argues that companies can not rely on this. To respond to this, Chaotics recommends that business create systems that are responsive, robust, and resilient, to ensure that they can rapidly adapt to changing circumstances.

In reviewing Kotler and Caslione's book, Paul Gift agrees with their view of businesses being structured to rapidly adapt to turbulent times. However, he disagrees with their view that the world is entering an age of turbulence, an argument that Gift views as merely a scare tactic.

== Books ==
- CHAOTICS: The Business of Managing and Marketing in The Age of Turbulence (AMACOM Publishing May 2009) ISBN 0-8144-1521-0
