= No Humans Involved (novel) =

2007 novel by Kelley Armstrong

- First edition
- Author: Kelley Armstrong
- Language: English
- Series: Women of the Otherworld
- Genre: Urban fantasy
- Publisher: Bantam Books
- Publication date: May 1, 2007
- Publication place: Canada
- Media type: Print (Hardcover)
- Pages: 342
- ISBN: 0-553-80508-8
- OCLC: 76801781
- Dewey Decimal: 813/.6 22
- LC Class: PS3551.R4678 N6 2007
- Preceded by: Broken
- Followed by: Personal Demon

No Humans Involved is the seventh novel in Kelley Armstrong's fantasy series Women of the Otherworld. It is narrated by Jaime Vegas, a necromancer.

== Plot ==
Jaime found herself wrestling with her decision to participate. While the promise of money and the possibility of gaining control over her abilities had initially drawn her in, the show's relentless pursuit of the paranormal was beginning to take a toll on her psyche. The relentless exposure to haunted locations and the escalating obsession with eerie phenomena was pushing Jaime to confront her deepest fears. She had always avoided using her abilities, but the show's unrelenting focus on the supernatural was forcing her to break free from her self-imposed limits.

Meanwhile, Eve, Jaime's loyal companion, became increasingly suspicious of the show's production. She had noticed subtle inconsistencies in the footage, leading her to suspect that producer Jeremy was orchestrating events behind the scenes to amp up the drama for higher ratings. As she delved deeper, Eve uncovered a hidden agenda lurking within the show's production. She realized that a mysterious entity seemed to be influencing the haunted locations, manipulating the events and fueling the show's sensationalistic narrative.

Jaime, the enigmatic paranormal investigator, found herself drawn into a haunting case when Hope Adams approached her with a plea for help. Haunted by the restless spirit of her deceased husband, Hope sought Jaime's expertise to appease the troubled soul. With reluctance, Jaime accepted the task, unaware of the malevolent force lurking behind the guise. As Jaime delved into the investigation, she uncovered a sinister truth. The spirit haunting Hope was not her husband at all but a malevolent entity masquerading as him. Jaime's senses detected the demonic nature of the creature and realized it was working in concert with a shadowy figure named Karl Marsten.

Faced with the growing threat, Jaime unleashed the full extent of her paranormal prowess. A fierce confrontation ensued, leaving Hope deeply shaken and disturbed by the revelation of the demon's true nature. Meanwhile, Eve, a determined researcher, pursued her own investigations that led her to Savannah Levine, her estranged daughter. Savannah revealed a dark family secret, a curse that had plagued their lineage for generations, fueling the supernatural events that plagued Jaime's investigations.

The demon, emboldened by the show's success, orchestrates a gruesome public display, targeting the show's crew and viewers. Jaime realizes the demon is feeding on the fear and energy generated by the show, using it as a conduit to escape its confinement. Jeremy, consumed by his own ambition, refuses to believe the truth, pushing Jaime and Eve to confront him. The confrontation turns violent, leaving Jeremy struggling with the consequences of his actions. Jaime, with the help of a reluctantly supportive Eve, confronts Savannah and the demon. She realizes he must embrace her powers and the darkness within her to defeat the demon, ultimately making a desperate choice to sacrifice herself to break the curse that binds hiler and Savannah.

Jaime's sacrifice creates a wave of energy that neutralizes the demon and breaks the curse, freeing Savannah from its influence. The show is canceled, and Jeremy is forced to face the fallout of his actions. Eve, forever changed by the ordeal, takes over the camera, vowing to expose the truth behind the paranormal world. She reflects on Jaime's sacrifice, understanding the burden she carried and the lengths she went to protect others.

== Characters ==
- Jaime Vegas - A necromancer with a troubled past and a dangerous ability to raise the dead.
- Jeremy Danvers - The enigmatic Alpha werewolf, leads the Pack, a powerful tribe of shape-shifters.
- Eve Levine - The charismatic witch, possesses a deep understanding of the supernatural world.
- Hope Adams - A cunning werewolf with a thirst for both blood and knowledge.
- Savannah Levine - Eve's younger sister who struggles to control her growing powers as a witch.
- Karl Marsten - The mysterious on the rogue werewolf with a complex connection to Jaime.
