= City of the Lost =

2016 novel by Kelley Armstrong

- First edition
- Author: Kelley Armstrong
- Language: English
- Genre: Crime fiction, Mystery fiction, Thriller
- Publisher: Sphere Books
- Publication place: Canada and United States
- Pages: 416
- ISBN: 9780345816153
- Followed by: A Darkness Absolute

City of the Lost is a 2016 crime fiction novel written by Kelley Armstrong. It follows homicide detective Casey Duncan in the hidden Rockton, a small, off-the-grid town in the wilderness of the Canadian Yukon where people go when they wish to disappear. After fleeing to the town with her best friend Diana, Casey begins to investigate a string of grisly murders as she attempts to uncover the killer in their midst. It was published in May 2016.

In June 2018, it was announced that Temple Street Productions had acquired television rights for the Rockton series which begins with City of the Lost.

== Plot summary ==
At age eighteen, Casey Duncan is attending police college to become a detective, much to the disapproval of her parents, who are both prominent doctors. She is dating Blaine Saratori, a small-time drug dealer who brags he is the grandson of a mobster in Montreal. Her high school friend Diana is attending a nearby community college and living with her. One night as Casey and Blaine cut through an alley after leaving a bar, several gang members attack them and accuse Blaine of trespassing on their turf. After their leader threatens Casey, she disarms them, expecting Blaine to grab the gun so they can escape. Instead, he runs away and she is presumably raped after being beaten unconscious. Several weeks later, after waking from a four-day coma, Casey seeks out Blaine who she blames for leaving her for dead and not calling the police, as she was only found hours after the attack by a drunken stranger. He has since denied abandoning her, claiming they split up. When he continues to refuse to apologize or take responsibility for his actions, she shoots him in the heat of the moment, killing him. Afterwards, she throws away the gun and calls 911 anonymously, giving a description of the gang members. She is never caught.

Twelve years later, Casey is a detective with the Special Victims Unit. Her parents died in a small plane crash years ago. She has developed a bizarre game of Russian roulette in which she tells her therapists what she has done, believing that if she deserves to be caught, she will be. Casey is still friends with Diana, as their relationship was strengthened after Diana remained with her after her attack and has kept the secret of Blaine's murder since she confessed after Diana found her changing out of her bloodstained clothing. Diana has since married and divorced Graham Berry, her abusive ex-husband, a respected lawyer and "brilliant psycho," who often beat Diana, once attempting to kill her. Casey moved with Diana when she relocated to escape him and is in a relationship based on casual sex with an ex-con bartender named Kurt. One night at his bar after work, Diana tells Casey that Graham is in town in business and sought her out, trying to convince her to return to him and asking her to dinner. Her arm is badly bruised from where he grabbed her in the parking garage afterwards. Casey finds Graham the next day and warns him to stay away from Diana, threatening him with a statutory rape charge from his past. Convinced she has scared him off after Diana tells Casey he has left, Casey instructs Diana to lie low and stay in her apartment for the next few days. Diana tells Casey of a town she has heard about where people who wish to disappear can go, located deep in the Yukon wilderness and completely off-the-grid. Casey dismisses it as an urban legend, but Diana insists it is real.

She spends that night with Kurt, who has been getting strange phone calls he believes are connected to his life as a criminal. That combined with Casey believing someone is stalking her prompt her to follow after Kurt when he leaves at two in the morning to make a deposit. She narrowly saves him; a man shoots him in the shoulder, telling him he was sent by Mr. Saratori before running away. He is hospitalized but in no serious danger and Casey realizes that her most recent therapist must have told someone what she had done and Blaine's grandfather, Leo Saratori is after her.

When she returns to her apartment, she finds Diana badly beaten. She claims Graham returned and hurt her in return for Casey's threats. Casey agrees to let Diana look into the mysterious town and they are soon contacted by its members, who instruct them to send identification and information and evidence on their situation for an extensive screening process to be granted admission. A few days later they meet with two people: a secretarial woman named Val, and a man from the town's local law enforcement who demands to interview Casey separately. The reason she and Diana were ever considered, he tells Casey, is because he is the sheriff and is in need of a detective. But he has figured out that she is responsible for Blaine's murder and does not want her; furthermore he does not believe Diana's story. Eventually, Casey convinces him to agree to a deal: if he allows them into the town, she will leave as long as Diana is allowed to stay. They are given four days to create fake trails before their disappearance. Diana leaves before Casey, who spends a last night with Kurt at an inn, where he gifts her a necklace. She leaves a note for him before she leaves to meet the sheriff. He finally introduces himself as Eric Dalton and reiterates their deal: she will stay six months in the town, which he calls Rockton, otherwise the Council will not let Diana in, as she isn't useful. They drive for several hours before flying in a plane, which he pilots himself. No contact is allowed while they are in Rockton; Casey's cell phone is confiscated and she is disallowed to answer a last message from Kurt.

When they arrive in Rockton, Casey immediately meets several residents of the town. Will Anders is Dalton's handsome and friendly deputy, a former soldier who takes an immediate shine to Casey. Beth Lowry is the town doctor and Isabel owns the Roc, a local bar. Several residents of Rockton abuse a locally manufactured drug called rydex, as Casey learns. Dalton believes Hastings, a chemist in the town is responsible for making it more addictive. Meanwhile, the body of a missing man, Henry Powys is found in the woods, missing its legs. Initially, it is believed animals were responsible but it is soon determined the legs were hacked off by a human.

Casey is reunited with Diana who has become much more cheerful since she arrived in Rockton. She is partying, mingling, and even dating a few men in town as men outnumber women three to one. Because of the high concentration of men compared to women and the fact they live in such an isolated environment, rates of sexual assault are high. Hastings is seen walking into the forest before going missing and Casey, Dalton, and Anders hunt the forest for him. They find a skull nailed to a tree, but no sign of Hastings.

== Characters ==
- Casey Duncan/Butler is the narrator of the story. Her father was a renowned cardiologist and her mother was chief of pediatric surgery. She has an older sister she talks to once a year who is a neuroscientist. She befriended Diana in high school and they have remained friends since then, even though Diana has repeatedly jumped at opportunities to abandon Casey for others. After her attack as a teenager, she was forced to drop out of the police academy. She received a bachelor's degree in criminology, a blackbelt in akido, and a flyweight championship in boxing. Within five years of the attack she was on track to become a detective. Casey has a near genius IQ of 135. She takes after her half-Chinese, half-Filipino mother in appearance.
- Eric Dalton is the sheriff of Rockton. He is initially very brusque and curt towards Casey, who he considers a wreck waiting to happen. He also suspects she and Diana are planted Council spies. Eventually, though, he begins to warm to her, often taking steps to ensure her well-being and spend time with her. According to most, he is the person in Rockton who cares most about it, as he grew up in it, its only ever child. Abbygail Kemp harbored a crush on him after she arrived in Rockton. He in turn began to view himself as an older brother figure and developed protective tendencies towards her, being oblivious to her crush until she kissed him, drunk after her birthday party. He has a strong sense of justice and keeps a journal of town residents who he believes are in Rockton under false pretenses. As a young man, he often indulged in relationships with the women who passed through Rockton, but quit after he realized they all wished to "fix" him and help him create a "real" life by taking him south. Dalton, who maintains that he would go into the wilderness before he does so, is constantly threatened by the shadowy Council with expulsion from Rockton and fears it more than anything. Casey convinces him to begin to consider an alternative if he is expelled: starting a new town like Rockton. She estimates at least fifty people would follow him, including Will, Beth, and almost all of essential services, as well as herself. Later, after Casey is told by Beth she can return to her old life, Casey does not express her will to stay immediately, still unsure of his welcome and he storms into the forest. Eventually, they enter a romantic relationship and he reveals to Casey he was not born to the former sheriff as everyone believes; he was kidnapped from his parents and younger brother Jacob by the Daltons when he was nine, who believed they were giving him a better life.
- Will Anders/Calvin James is Dalton's deputy. He killed his commanding officer before fleeing to Rockton at the begging of his sister. He is an incredibly handsome black man, tall, muscled, with an Army tattoo on his bicep.
- Diana Berry has been Casey's best friend since high school.
- Elizabeth "Beth" Lowry is Rockton's doctor. She was a Harvard graduate and surgeon before a patient died in her care while she was on amphetamines. The hospital changed the records to shift the blame of two other mysterious deaths to her before she fled to Rockton. Both her parents were detectives. Beth has photographic memory. She was very close to Abbygail Kemp before Abby's death, as she took care of her in her early days as a resident and nursed her through withdrawal and then worked with her at the town's clinic. Beth is eventually revealed to be the killer of Hastings, Powys, and Irene, with Mick's help. She killed them after learning they were responsible for Abbygail's death and recruited Mick, later stabbing him to death after he began to be concerned by the brutal natures of the murders. She is in love with Eric Dalton and has made several subtle attempts at seducing him according to Isabel, though he shows no interest because she wishes to change him and bring him down south. She attempted to frame Diana for the stabbing of Mick to get rid of Casey, whom she knew was growing close to him. At the end of the novel, she is forced out of Rockton by the Council, who send a plane, not trusting Dalton to escort her out alive. She is in her late thirties with chestnut brown hair.
- Isabel Radcliffe is a former psychologist and current owner of Rockton's brothel, the Roc. She is described by Casey to be in her early forties and very attractive, with a flattering figure, dark eyes and dark hair laced with silver. Casey disapproves of Isabel and the Roc, as she believes it creates an environment in such a small town where women are expected to accept payment for sex. Casey initially believes Mick is her "boy toy" before she comes to understand the two were very much in love. She is the one that comes to Casey when she believes Diana is running wild. Later, after Mick's murder, she finds the notes on the residents Mick had secretly copied from Dalton on Rockton residents there under false pretenses and gives them to Casey. She admits that her initial friendly overtures towards Casey to gain an ally to halt Dalton's attempts to shut down the Roc but after Casey's treatment of her after the death of Mick and determination to solve the murders that she is genuinely interested in her as a person. As the novel ends, Isabel invites Casey and Petra for a drink, as well as Dalton, hinting that their relationship has thawed.
- Mick was a bartender at the Roc and Isabel's lover. He was in his mid-twenties and burly with dark hair. He came to Rockton from Vancouver, where he was a police officer. When he and his partner refused payoffs from a drug gang, his partner was shot. Mick retaliated by hunting them down and killing them. He dated Abbygail Kemp before her murder as they were the two youngest in town, but he viewed her more as a little sister. Knowing he was infatuated with Isabel, Abby encouraged him to pursue her and they broke up amicably. He was aware of Abby's crush on Eric and was the last person to see her before she disappeared into the woods. Though he wasn't romantically interested in her, he did love her very much, as evidenced by how upset he was by her disappearance. When they find her arm, he is so distressed he must leave the cave ahead of the others. His love for her is what motivates his hand in the murders of Hastings, Powys and Irene. He is later killed by Beth in the town's woodshed after he expresses his disturbance over the crimes' gruesome nature, for which Beth frames Diana.
- Abbygail Kemp
- Jerome Hastings
- Harry Powys
- Irene Prosser was a Rockton resident who came to escape an abusive husband. She lured Abbygail Kemp into the woods, where Abby was raped and killed by Hastings. She later confesses to Beth while under diazepam during a dental exam. Beth kills her and stages her death as a suicide, though Dalton is not fooled, as her wrists are cut so deep it seems as if someone has cut off her hands. Beth went on to fake her X-rays which evidenced she was in a former abusive relationship to mislead Casey into believing the murderer was a vigilante targeting residents who were in Rockton under false pretenses.
