= Women of the Otherworld =

Fantasy book series by Kelley Armstrong

- Bitten (2001); Stolen (2003); Dime Store Magic (2004); Industrial Magic (2004); Haunted (2005); Broken (2006); No Humans Involved (2007); Personal Demon (2008); Living with the Dead (2008); Frostbitten (2009); Waking the Witch (2010); Spell Bound (2011); 13 (2012)
- Author: Kelley Armstrong
- Country: Canada
- Language: English
- Genre: Horror; Paranormal Romance; Urban Fantasy
- Publisher: Viking Press; Bantam Spectra
- Media type: Print (Hardcover, Paperback) e-Book (Kindle)

Women of the Otherworld is a fantasy series by Canadian author Kelley Armstrong. The books feature werewolves, witches, necromancers, sorcerers, and vampires struggling to fit as "normal" in today's world. The series also includes novellas and short stories, published online (and one in an anthology).

== Novels ==
Note: all publishing information is for U.S. release dates. However, the books have been published in the United Kingdom and in Canada.

- Book 01: Bitten (published October, 2001 by Viking Press)
- Book 02: Stolen (published May, 2003 by Viking Press)
- Book 03: Dime Store Magic (published 2004 by Bantam Spectra)
- Book 04: Industrial Magic (published 2004 by Bantam Spectra)
- Book 05: Haunted (published 2005 by Bantam Spectra)
- Book 06: Broken (published May 2006 by Bantam Spectra)
- Book 07: No Humans Involved (published May 2007 by Bantam Spectra)
- Book 08: Personal Demon (published April 2008 by Bantam Spectra)
- Book 09: Living with the Dead (published November 2008 by Bantam Spectra)
- Book 10: Frostbitten (published September 2009 by Bantam Spectra)
- Book 11: Waking the Witch (published July 2010 by Bantam Spectra)
- Book 12: Spell Bound (published July 2011 by Dutton Penguin)
- Book 13: Thirteen (published July 2012 by Orbit)

== Narrators ==
The narrators change from book to book, although they do reappear in other books.

- Bitten: Elena Michaels, a werewolf. She has to deal with a terrible childhood as well as accepting all of who she is.
- Stolen: Elena Michaels faces a group of humans who kidnap her and other supernaturals.
- Dime Store Magic: Paige Winterbourne, a witch. Leader of the American Coven.
- Industrial Magic: Paige Winterbourne must deal with Lucas' family and a villain who is murdering children.
- Haunted: Eve Levine, the ghost of a half-demon witch. She has to contend with fears for her daughter's safety, who survived her and is being raised by another witch. She cannot directly protect her daughter since she is dead.
- Broken: Elena Michaels
- Chaotic (in anthology Dates from Hell): Hope Adams, a chaos half-demon. Journalist with newspaper True News.
- No Humans Involved: Jaime Vegas, a necromancer. She works in Hollywood as a necromancer on television, but saves her real powers for other work.
- Personal Demon : Hope Adams & sorcerer Lucas Cortez.
- Living With the Dead : Hope Adams, clairvoyant Adele Morrissey, human Robyn Peltier & necromancer John Findlay (Finn).
- Men of the Otherworld : Malcolm Danvers, Clayton Danvers & Jeremy Danvers.
- Frostbitten: Elena Michaels
- Tales of the Otherworld : Eve Levine, Clayton Danvers, Elena Michaels, Lucas Cortez & Paige Winterbourne.
- Waking the Witch: Savannah Levine
- Spell Bound: Savannah Levine
- Thirteen: Savannah Levine (Eve, Paige, Hope, Jaime and Elena each narrate one chapter)

== Complete list of books and novellas, in order ==
Below is a complete, in-universe chronological list of the series' 70 novels, online work, short stories, novellas and contributions to anthologies, based on the timeline given on Kelley Armstrong's official website.

Number (novels only)	Title	Collected in	Narrator(s)
	Rebirth	Tales of the Otherworld	Aaron
	Infusion	Men of the Otherworld	Malcolm
	Savage	Men of the Otherworld	Clay
	Ascension	Men of the Otherworld	Clay
	Bewitched	Tales of the Otherworld	Eve
	Demonology	Otherworld Nights	Talia
	Birthright	Tales of the Otherworld	Logan
	Beginnings	Tales of the Otherworld	Clay & Elena
	Becoming	Standalone graphic novel	Elena
	The Case of the Half-Demon Spy	Free online	Adam
	Expectations	Tales of the Otherworld	Lucas
	Truth and Consequences	Free online	Elena
	Territorial	Free online	Karl
01	Bitten	Novel	Elena
	Ghosts	Tales of the Otherworld	Jeremy
	Escape	Free online	Eve
02	Stolen	Novel	Elena
03	Dime Store Magic	Novel	Paige
04	Industrial Magic	Novel	Paige
	Wedding Bell Hell	Tales of the Otherworld	Paige
05	Haunted	Novel	Eve
	Adventurer	Free online	Kenneth
	Chaotic	Otherworld Chills	Hope
	Bargain	Free online	Xavier
06	Broken	Novel	Elena
	The Case of El Chupacabra	Tales of the Otherworld	Lucas
07	No Humans Involved	Novel	Jaime
	Framed	Free online	Nick
	Twilight	Otherworld Nights	Cassandra
	Stalked	Otherworld Nights	Clay
08	Personal Demon	Novel	Hope & Lucas
	Chivalrous	Otherworld Nights	Reese
	The Ungrateful Dead	Otherworld Secrets	Jaime
09	Living with the Dead	Novel	Multiple; 3rd person
	Kitsunegari	Men of the Otherworld	Jeremy
	Zen and the Art of Vampirism	Otherworld Secrets	Zoe
	Angelic	Otherworld Secrets	Eve
	Learning Curve	Led Astray: The Best of Kelley Armstrong	Zoe
	Lucifer’s Daughter	Otherworld Nights	Hope
	Checkmate	Free online	Elena
	Recruit	Free online	Elena
10	Frostbitten	Novel	Elena
	The List	Led Astray: The Best of Kelley Armstrong	Zoe
	Hidden	Otherworld Nights	Elena
	Forbidden	Otherworld Secrets	Elena
	Counterfeit Magic	Otherworld Secrets	Paige
	Off-Duty Angel	Otherworld Chills	Eve
	V Plates	Led Astray: The Best of Kelley Armstrong	Nick
	Amityville Horrible	Otherworld Chills	Jaime
	The Summoning	The Darkest Powers #1	Chloe Saunders
	The Awakening	The Darkest Powers #2	Chloe Saunders
	The Reckoning	The Darkest Powers #3	Chloe Saunders
	The Gathering	The Darkness Rising #1	Maya Delaney
	The Calling	The Darkness Rising #2	Maya Delaney
	The Rising	The Darkness Rising #3	Maya Delaney
11	Waking the Witch	Novel	Savannah
12	Spell Bound	Novel	Savannah
13	Thirteen	Novel	Savannah
	From Russia with Love	Otherworld Nights	Elena
	Vanishing Act	Otherworld Nights	Savannah
	Brazen	Otherworld Chills	Nick
	Bounty Hunt	Standalone graphic novel	Reese
	Forsaken	Standalone novella with illustrations	Elena
	The Puppy Plan	Otherworld Chills	Logan
	Driven	Standalone novella with illustrations	Elena
	Tailed	Urban Allies (anthology; edited by Joseph Nassise; crossover collaboration with Seanan McGuire)	Elena
	Life After Theft	Otherworld Secrets	Hope
	Sorry Seems to be the Hardest Word	Otherworld Chills / Expiration Date (anthology; edited by Nancy Kilpatrick)	Zoe
	Baby Boom	Otherworld Chills	Paige/Lucas
	Wolf's Bane	Otherworld Young Adult	Kate/Logan Danvers
	Wolf's Curse	Otherworld Young Adult	Kate/Logan Danvers

Armstrong's "Short Fiction" page on her site also lists the following five stories, but they are not listed on the timeline:

Title	Collected in	Narrator(s)
Bamboozled	Led Astray: The Best of Kelley Armstrong	Non-series character
Branded	Led Astray: The Best of Kelley Armstrong	Non-series character
Life Sentence	Led Astray: The Best of Kelley Armstrong	Non-series character
Young Bloods	Led Astray: The Best of Kelley Armstrong	Non-series character
Paranormal Romance Blues	Mammoth Book of Paranormal Romance	Non-series character

== See also ==
- Darkest Powers - Another series by Kelley Armstrong, set in the same universe as the Otherworld
  - The Summoning
  - The Awakening
  - The Reckoning
  - The Gathering
