= Bitten (TV series) =

2014 Canadian TV series

- Genre: Drama; Fantasy; Horror
- Created by: Daegan Fryklind
- Based on: Women of the Otherworld by Kelley Armstrong
- Starring: Laura Vandervoort; Greyston Holt; Greg Bryk; Paul Greene; Steve Lund; Michael Xavier; Genelle Williams; Tommie-Amber Pirie
- Composer: Todor Kobakov
- Country of origin: Canada
- Original language: English
- No. of seasons: 3
- No. of episodes: 33 (list of episodes)

Production
- Executive producers: Daegan Fryklind; Grant Rosenberg; Patrick Banister; John Barbisan; John Morayniss; Margaret O'Brien; Tecca Crosby; J.B. Sugar; Wil Zmak
- Producers: Margaret O'Brien; J.B. Sugar; Norman Denver
- Cinematography: Stephen Reizes; Boris Mojsovski; Craig Wright
- Running time: 43–45 minutes
- Production companies: Hoodwink Entertainment; Kabient productions; No Equal Entertainment; Entertainment One Television; Bell Media

Original release
- Network: Space; Syfy
- Release: January 11, 2014 – April 15, 2016

Bitten is a Canadian fantasy television series based on the Women of the Otherworld series of books by author Kelley Armstrong. The name was inspired by the first book in the series. The show was produced as an original series for Space, with most filming in Toronto and Cambridge, Ontario. Its third and final season finished in April 2016.

== Series overview ==
The first season's story centres on Elena Michaels (portrayed by Laura Vandervoort), a female werewolf who is torn between a normal life in Toronto with her human boyfriend, Philip, and her "family" obligations as a werewolf in upstate New York. Among her pack is her ex-fiancé Clayton, who is responsible for her becoming a werewolf.

In the second season, story centres on the aftermath of the battle, as other packs demand they hunt down the remaining rebellion, as well as the meeting of witches Paige and Ruth, who are looking to save their lost coven member, Savannah, from evil warlock Aleister.

The third season reveals Elena's true origins as members of her biological family who she did not know about come to find her. However, they have a secret too, in that they are on the run from another larger, more dangerous pack.

Season	Episodes	Originally released	
Season	Episodes	First released	Last released
1	13	January 11, 2014	April 5, 2014
2	10	February 7, 2015	April 11, 2015
3	10	February 12, 2016	April 15, 2016

== Cast and characters ==
=== Main ===
- Laura Vandervoort as Elena Michaels
- Greyston Holt as Clayton Danvers
- Greg Bryk as Jeremy Danvers
- Steve Lund as Nick Sorrentino
- Paul Greene as Philip McAdams (season 1)
- Michael Xavier as Logan Jonsen (seasons 1–2)
- Genelle Williams as Rachel Sutton (season 3, recurring seasons 1–2)
- Tommie-Amber Pirie as Paige Winterbourne (season 3, recurring season 2)

=== Recurring ===
- Paulino Nunes as Antonio Sorrentino (season 1)
- Joel Keller as Peter Myers (season 1)
- Benjamin Ayres as Jorge Sorrentino (seasons 1, 3)
- Elias Toufexis as Joey Stillwell
- Michael Luckett as Daniel Santos (season 1)
- James McGowan as Malcolm Danvers (seasons 1–2)
- Noah Danby as Zachary Cain
- Pascal Langdale as Karl Marsten
- Curtis Carravaggio as Thomas LeBlanc (season 1)
- Patrick Garrow as Victor Olson (season 1)
- Marc Bendavid as Scott Brandon (season 1)
- Ryan Kelly as Nate Parker (seasons 1–2)
- Dan Petronijevic as Samuel Boggs (season 1)
- Fiona Highet as Sheriff Karen Morgan (seasons 1, 3)
- Rogan Christopher as Deputy Paul O'Neil (season 1)
- Natalie Brown as Diane McAdams (seasons 1–2)
- Sherry Miller as Olivia McAdams (season 1)
- Eve Harlow as Amber (season 1)
- Natalie Lisinska as Sylvie (season 1)
- Ace Hicks as Becky McAdams (season 1)
- Evan Buliung as Michael Braxton (season 1)
- Noah Cappe as Travis (season 1)
- Chris Ratz as Jack (season 1)
- Kaitlyn Leeb as Amanda (season 1)
- Tammy Isbell as Ruth Winterbourne (season 2)
- Sean Rogerson as Aleister (season 2)
- Kiara Glasco as Savannah Levine (season 2)
- Debra McCabe as Clara Sullivan (season 2)
- Angela Besharah as Bridget (season 2)
- Carly Street as Dr. Sondra Bauer (season 2)
- Daniel Kash as Roman Navikev (seasons 2–3)
- Brock Johnson as Richard Hart (season 2)
- Mishka Thebaud as Eduardo Escobado (seasons 2–3)
- Salvatore Antonio as Rodrigo Sanchez (season 2)
- John Ralston as Sasha Antonov (season 3)
- Sofia Banzhaf as Katia Antonov (season 3)
- Alex Ozerov as Alexei Antonov (season 3)
- Rafael Petardi as Konstantin Saranin (season 3)
- Oliver Becker as The Albino (season 3)
- Ian Lake as Anson Haight (season 3)
- Ian Matthews as Bucky Durst (season 3)

=== Guests ===
- Mackenzie Gray as Jimmy Koenig (season 1)
- Shauna MacDonald as Lily Bevelaqua (season 2)
- Mark Irvingsen as Freddie Durst (season 3)
- Steve Puchalski as Leon Durst (season 3)

== Production ==
On May 22, 2014, the series was renewed for a second season of 10 episodes, with production beginning in Summer. On May 22, 2015, Space confirmed that the series would be renewed for a third season, with filming set to begin in the summer / fall of 2015. It was confirmed in December 2015 that the third season of Bitten would be its final one.

=== Music ===
Todor Kobakov was hired to compose the score for the series.

==== Score ====
Bitten – Score Soundtrack Vol. 1

Film score by Todor Kobakov
- Released: March 18, 2014
- Length: 46:52
- Label: Entertainment One

Bitten – Score Soundtrack Vol. 1 was released on March 18, 2014.

Bitten – Score Soundtrack Vol. 1
No.	Title	Length
1.	"Opening Theme"	0:35
2.	"Sexy Wolf"	3:08
3.	"The Pack Gathers"	1:15
4.	"Time for a Run"	0:40
5.	"Clay and Elena"	0:57
6.	"Clay Wins"	0:42
7.	"First Blood"	1:21
8.	"Naughty Dream"	1:33
9.	"Wolf Chaos"	1:46
10.	"Antonio at Work"	0:52
11.	"Clay and Elena Run"	2:23
12.	"Elena Gets Bitten"	2:51
13.	"First Transformation"	4:41
14.	"Santos Pleads His Case"	0:48
15.	"Positive"	0:40
16.	"Eyes in a Box"	1:44
17.	"Bad Time for a Sheriff"	1:14
18.	"Sheriff in the Den"	0:34
19.	"The Battle"	1:47
20.	"Clay and Elena Aftermath"	0:50
21.	"Clean Up"	0:51
22.	"A Baby and a Killer"	1:17
23.	"It's Joey"	1:03
24.	"Joey, Clay and Elena"	1:42
25.	"Meet Clay"	1:05
26.	"Tension at the Gallery"	1:16
27.	"Everything Is on Edge"	1:41
28.	"Trust Logan"	1:46
29.	"This Is a Nightmare"	1:40
30.	"We Have to Get Clay"	1:08
31.	"One More Thing to Fix"	1:46
32.	"Recap"	1:16

== Broadcast ==
The series was acquired by Syfy for airing in the United States, and premiered in January 2014. It premiered in Australia on August 8, 2015, on FOX8. SyfyUK commenced broadcast on May 19, 2016.

== Home media ==
Title	Set details	Blu-ray and DVD release dates	Special features
Title	Set details	Region A/1	Special features
Bitten — The Complete First Season	Discs: 4; Episodes: 13	August 12, 2014	Behind-the-Scenes Featurette; Deleted Scenes; Split Screen Stunt Choreography; Audio Commentary with Laura Vandervort and Producers
Bitten — The Complete Second Season	Discs: 3; Episodes: 10	July 7, 2015	Behind-the-Scenes Featurette; Deleted and Extended Scenes; Stunt Choreography; Gag Reel; Gentling Video; Bitten New York Comic Con Panel; Innerspace: After Bite
Bitten — The Final Season	Discs: 3; Episodes: 10	July 19, 2016	
Bitten: The Complete Series	Discs: 10; Episodes: 33	October 11, 2016	

== Reception ==
=== Ratings ===
In ratings, Bitten averaged 348,000 viewers in its timeslot, making it Space's highest-rated original series of all time.

=== Awards and nominations ===
Year	Award	Category	Nominee	Result	Refs
2014	Directors Guild of Canada Awards	Production Design - Television Series	Rob Gray	Nominated	
2014	Leo Awards	Best Screenwriting Dramatic Series	Daegan Fryklind	Nominated	
2014	Leo Awards	Best Guest Performance by a Male in a Dramatic Series	Mackenzie Gray	Won	
2014	Leo Awards	Best Lead Performance by a Male in a Dramatic Series	Greyston Holt	Nominated	
2015	Golden Maple Awards	Best Actor in a TV Series Broadcasted in the U.S.	Greyston Holt	Nominated	
2016	Golden Maple Awards	Best Actress in a TV series broadcast in the U.S.	Laura Vandervoort	Nominated	
2016	Prix Aurora Awards	Best Visual Presentation	Bitten	Nominated	

== InnerSpace: After Bite ==
A live after-show titled InnerSpace: After Bite premiered on Space on February 7, 2015, following the season two premiere. After Bite featured hosts Morgan Hoffman and Teddy Wilson discussing the latest episode with actors and producers of Bitten.
