= Kelley Armstrong =

Canadian writer (born 1968)

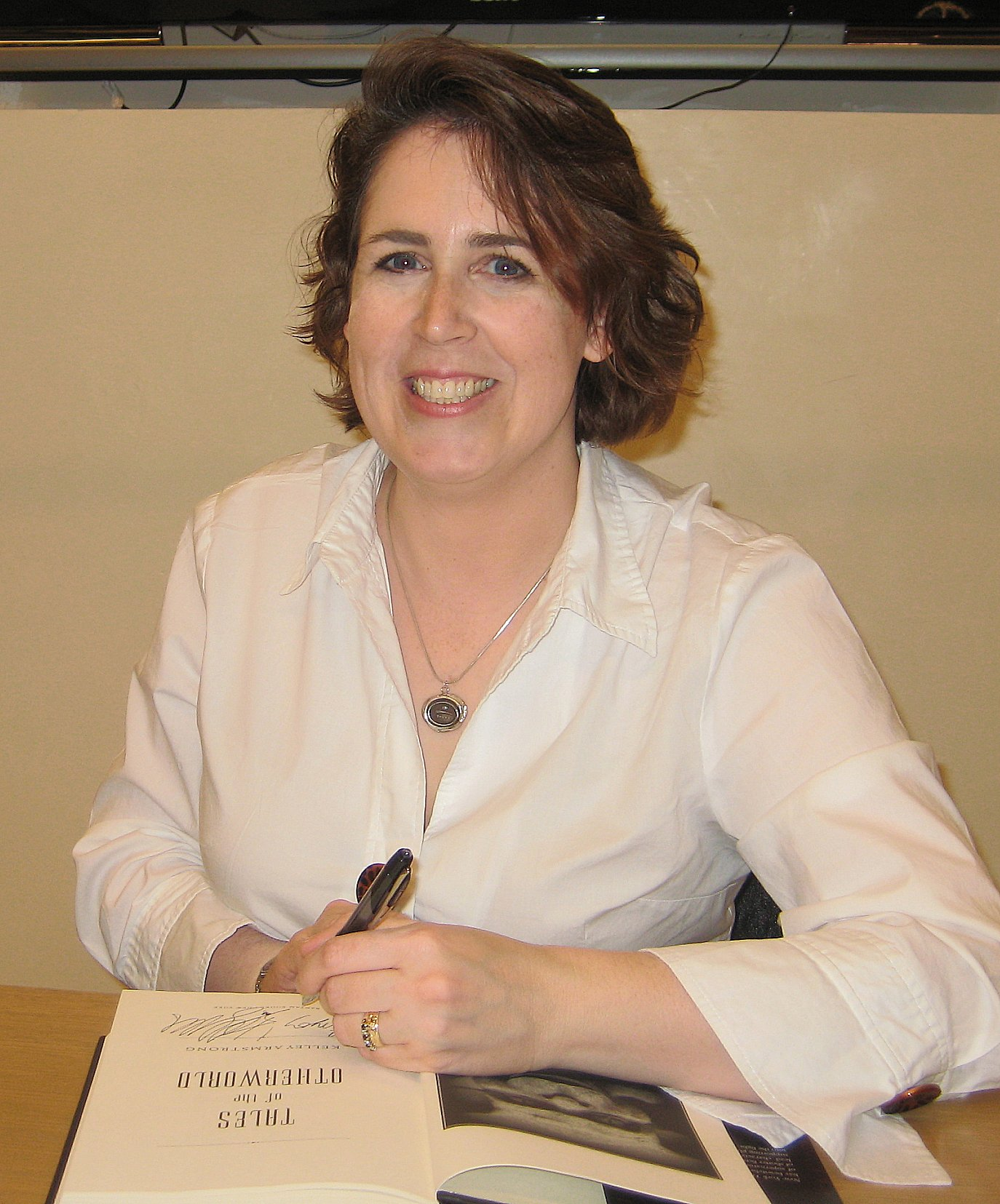
- Armstrong at a book-signing in 2010
- Born: Kelley L. Armstrong; 14 December 1968 (age 57); Sudbury, Ontario, Canada
- Occupation: Novelist
- Children: 3
- Writing career
- Language: English
- Period: 1999–present
- Genres: Fantasy, horror, crime, romance
- Website: www.kelleyarmstrong.com

Kelley Armstrong (born 14 December 1968) is a Canadian writer, primarily of fantasy novels since 2001.

She has published thirty-one fantasy novels to date, thirteen in her Women of the Otherworld series, five in her Cainsville series, six in her Rockton series, three in her Darkest Powers series, three in her Darkness Rising trilogy and three in the Age of Legends series, and three stand-alone teen thrillers. She has also published three middle-grade fantasy novels in the Blackwell Pages trilogy, with co-author Melissa Marr. As well, she is the author of three crime novels, the Nadia Stafford trilogy. She has also written several serial novellas and short stories for the Otherworld series, some of which are available free from her website. Starting in 2014, a Canadian television series based on the Women of the Otherworld, called Bitten, aired for 3 seasons on Space, and SyFy.

== Biography ==
Armstrong signing autographs for a fan at a book signing.

Kelley Armstrong was born on 14 December 1968, the oldest of four siblings in a "typical middle-class family" in Sudbury, Ontario.

After graduating with a degree in psychology from University of Western Ontario, Armstrong then switched to studying computer programming at Fanshawe College so she would have time to write.

Her first novel Bitten was sold in 1999, and it was released in 2001. Following her first success she has written a total of 13 novels and a number of novellas in the world of the Women of the Otherworld series, and her first crime novel, Exit Strategy, was released July 2007. Armstrong has been a full-time writer and parent since 2002.

Her novel No Humans Involved (the seventh book of the Women of the Otherworld series) was a The New York Times bestseller in the hardback fiction category on 20 May 2007. Also, her YA novel The Awakening was a No. 1 The New York Times bestseller in the Children's Chapter books category on 17 May 2009.

== Description of work ==
Armstrong's Women of the Otherworld series is part of a recently popular contemporary fantasy subgenre of the fantasy genre that superimposes supernatural characters upon a backdrop of contemporary North American life, with strong romantic elements. Within that subgenre, she is notable for including many types of supernatural characters, including witches, sorcerers, werewolves, necromancers, ghosts, shamans, demons and vampires, rather than limiting herself primarily to a single type of supernatural creature. Most of her works have a mystery genre plot, with leading characters investigating some novel situation or unsolved question.

In the Otherworld novels, most supernatural powers are either hereditary, or arise from the act of an existing supernatural of the same type. The Otherworld, while it has overarching conflicts and plotlines that span multiple novels, is not an epic battle between good and evil. The novels are largely episodic with the continuing plotlines primarily involving the developing lives of the main characters.

Her contemporary fantasy writings share genre similarities with writers Charlaine Harris, Laurell K. Hamilton, and Kim Harrison.

== Works ==
=== Standalone novels ===
- Wherever She Goes (2019)
- Every Step She Takes (2020)
- The Life She Had (2022) (as K.L. Armstrong)
- Hemlock Island (2023)
- Known to the Victim (2024) (as K.L. Armstrong)
- Finding Mr. Write (2024)
- I'll Be Waiting (2024)
- Writing Mr. Wrong (2025)

==== Young adult ====
- The Masked Truth (2015)
- The Unquiet Past (2016)
- Missing (2017)
- Aftermath (2018)
- Someone Is Always Watching (2023), ISBN 9780735270923
- A Deadly Inheritance (2026)

=== The Women of the Otherworld Series ===
The Women of the Otherworld books feature werewolves, witches, necromancers, sorcerers, and vampires struggling to fit as "normal" in today's world. The series also includes novellas and short stories, published online (and one in an anthology)

Book #	Publication Date	Title	Anthology or Collection	Narrator	Ref.
0.5	Jul 2012	Beginnings	Werewolves Tales of the Otherworld		
1	2001	Bitten	Werewolves Tales of the Otherworld		
2	2002	Stolen	Werewolves		
3	2004	Dime Store Magic	Spellcasters Witch Magic		
4	2004	Industrial Magic	Spellcasters Witch Magic		
4.5	Jun 2016	Wedding Bell Hell	Spellcasters Tales of the Otherworld		
5	2005	Haunted			
6	2006	Broken			
7	2007	No Humans Involved			
8	2008	Personal Demon			
9	2008	Living with the Dead			
10	2009	Frostbitten			
11	2010	Waking the Witch			
12	2011	Spell Bound			
13	2012	Thirteen			
13.1	Nov 2015	Branded	Shards & Ashes		

- All other stories may be found on the series' main article.

==== Otherworld novellas ====
Title	Publication Date	Anthology or Collection	Comments
Driven	Jan 2016		
Forsaken	Jan 2015		
Bounty Hunt	Dec 2014		Graphic Novel
Brazen	Dec 2013	Otherworld Chills	
Amityville Horrible	Jan 2013	Otherworld Chills	
Forbidden Nights	Dec 2012		
Hidden	Dec 2011	Otherworld Nights	
Becoming			Graphic Novel
Counterfeit Magic	Dec 2010	Otherworld Secrets	
Angelic	2011	Otherworld Secrets	
Chaotic	Jan 2012	Otherworld Chills	

==== Otherworld Young Adult ====
1. Wolf's Bane (Oct 2019)
2. Wolf's Curse (Mar 2020)

=== The Nadia Stafford Series ===
1. Exit Strategy (novel, Jul 2007)
2. Made to be Broken (novel, Feb 2009)
3. Wild Justice (novel, late 2013)
4. Double Play (Apr 2016)
5. Perfect Victim (Nov 2017)

=== The Darkest Powers Series ===
==== The Darkest Powers Trilogy ====
Book #	Title	Publication Date	Anthology or Collection	Comments	Ref.
0.4	Dangerous	Dec 2017	The Complete Darkest Power Tales Darkest Power Tales	Narrator: Derek	
0.5	Kat		The Eternal Kiss		
1	The Summoning	Jul 2008	The Darkest Power Trilogy Darkest Power Tales		
1.5	Divided	2009	The Complete Darkest Power Tales Darkest Power Tales	Narrator: Derek	
2	The Awakening	Apr 2009	The Darkest Power Trilogy	Narrator: Tori and Simon	
2.5	Disenchanted	Dec 2017	The Complete Darkest Power Tales Darkest Power Tales		
3	The Reckoning	Apr 2010	The Darkest Power Trilogy		
3.4	Facing Facts	Dec 2017	The Complete Darkest Power Tales Enthralled Darkest Power Tales		
3.5	Hunting Kat	Mar 2012	Kisses From Hell		
3.6	Belonging	Dec 2017	The Darkest Powers Tales Darkest Power Tales	Narrator: Derek	

==== The Darkness Rising Trilogy ====
Book #	Title	Publication Date	Anthology or Collection	Comments	Ref.
1	The Gathering	Apr 2011	Darkness Rising		
1.5	The New Guy	Dec 2017	The Complete Darkest Power Tales	Narrator: Maya	
1.6	The Invitation	Dec 2017	The Complete Darkest Power Tales		
2	The Calling	Apr 2012	Darkness Rising		
3	The Rising	Apr 2013	Darkness Rising		
3.5	Atoning	Mar 2015	The Complete Darkest Power Tales	Narrator: Chloe	

=== Cainsville series ===
1. Omens (novel, Aug 2013)
2. Visions (novel, Aug 2014)
3. Deceptions (novel, Aug 2015)
4. Betrayals (novel, Aug 2016)
5. Rituals (novel, Aug 2017)
6. Portents: A Collection of Cainsville Tales (collection, Aug 2018)
7. Cruel Fate (novella, Apr 2019)
8. Rough Justice (novella, Jun 2018)
9. Lost Souls (novella, Mar 2017)

=== The Age of Legends Series ===
1. Sea of Shadows (novel, 2014)
2. Empire of Night (novel, 2015)
3. Forest of Ruin (novel, 2016)

=== The Blackwell Pages Trilogy ===
Written under the alias: K. L. Armstrong. Co-authored with Melissa Marr.

1. Loki's Wolves (2013)
2. Odin's Ravens (May 2014)
3. Thor's Serpent (May 2015)

=== Rockton novels ===
1. City of the Lost (Jan 2017)
2. A Darkness Absolute (Nov 2017)
3. This Fallen Prey (Nov 2018)
4. Watcher in the Woods (Nov 2019)
5. Alone in the Wild (Feb 2020)
6. A Stranger in Town (Feb 2021)
7. The Deepest of Secrets (Feb 2022)

=== A Royal Guide to Monster Slaying ===
1. A Royal Guide to Monster Slaying (Aug 2019)
2. The Gryphon's Lair (Jun 2020)
3. The Serpent's Fury (Jun 2021)
4. The Final Trial (Jun 2022)

=== Haven's Rock ===
1. Murder at Haven's Rock (Feb 2023)
2. The Boy Who Cried Bear (Feb 2024)

=== A Stitch in Time ===
Book #	Title	Publication Date	Comments	Ref.
1	A Stitch in Time	Oct 2020		
1.5	Ballgowns & Butterflies	Nov 2020	Under a Winter Sky	
2	A Twist of Fate	Oct 2021		
2.5	Snowstorms & Sleigh Bells	Nov. 2021		
3	A Turn of the Tide	Oct. 2022		
3.5	Ghosts & Garlands	Nov. 2022		
4	A Castle in the Air	Oct. 2023		

=== Cursed Luck ===
Book #	Title	Publication Date	Comments
1	Cursed Luck	May 2021	
1.5	Goddess of Summer Love	Nov 2021	Hex on the Beach
2	High Jinx	Dec 2021	

=== A Rip Through Time ===
Book #	Title	Publication Date	Comments
1	A Rip Through Time	May 2022	
2	The Poisoner's Ring	May 2023	
2.5	Cocktails & Chloroform	December 2023	
3	Disturbing the Dead	May 2024	
3.5	Schemes & Scandals	December 2024	
4	Death at a Highland Wedding	May 2025	

=== Series in collaboration ===
Series Title	#	Title	In Collaboration With	Comments
Angel	Volume 5	Aftermath	Joss Whedon	Graphic Novel

=== Anthologies and collections ===
Title	Contents	Publication Date
Like a Charm	Plan B	2004
Witch Magic	Dime Store Magic Industrial Magic	2004
Dying for It: Tales of Sex and Death	Death Dealer	2006
Many Bloody Returns	Twilight	2007
My Big Fat Supernatural Honeymoon	Stalked	2008
Blood Lite	The Ungrateful Dead	2008
Mammoth Book of Paranormal Romance	Paranormal Romance Blues	2009
A Fantasy Medley	Zen and the Art of Vampirism	2009
The Eternal Kiss	Kat	2009
By Blood We Live	Twilight	2009
Tesseracts Thirteen	Dead to Me	2009
Twilight Zone: 19 Original Stories on the 50th Anniversary	A Haunted House of Her Own	2009
Campus Chills	Harbinger	2009
Hellbound Hearts	The Collector	2009
The Year's Best Dark Fantasy and Horror	A Haunted House of Her Own	2010
The New Dead	Life Sentence	2010
Evolve	Learning Curve	2010
The Bitten Word	Young Bloods	2010
Kisses from Hell	Hunting Kat	2010
The Living Dead 2	Last Stand	2010
Blood Lite 2: Overbite	Lucifer's Daughter	2010
Men of the Otherworld	Infusion Savage Ascension Kitsunegari	Feb 2010
The Urban Fantasy Anthology	A Haunted House of Her Own	2011
Vampires: The Recent Undead	Zen and the Art of Vampirism	2011
Tales of Dark Fantasy 2	Chivalrous	2011
Evolve 2	The List	2011
Imaginarium 2012: The Best Canadian Speculative Writing	The List	2011
The Monster's Corner	Rakshasi	2011
Enthralled	Facing Facts	2011
Subterranean Tales of Dark Fantasy 2	Chivalrous	2011
The Year's Best Dark Fantasy and Horror 2012	Rakshasi	2012
Blood Lite 3: Aftertaste	V Plates	2012
The Mammoth Book of Ghost Stories by Women	Dead Flowers by a Roadside	2012
Werewolves	Bitten Stolen Beginnings	July 2012
Tales of the Otherworld	Rebirth Birthright Beginnings Ghosts Expectations Wedding Bell Hell The Case of El Chupacabra Bewitched	Nov 2012
The Hunter and the Hunted	Off-Duty Angel Stalked	Jun 2012
Shards & Ashes	Branded	2013
Four Summoner's Tales	Suffer the Children	2013
Mama's Going to Buy You a Mockingbird	Introduction	2013
Spellcasters	Dime Store Magic Industrial Magic Wedding Bell Hell Case of the Half Demon Spy	Jun 2013
Dead Man's Hand	Bamboozled	2014
Out of Tune	Making Music	2014
Rags & Bones	New Chicago	2014
Fantasy for Good	The Kitsune's Nine Tales	2014
Subterranean Press Magazine	The Screams of Dragons	2014
Dark Screams: Vol 1	The Price You Pay	2014
The Darkest Power Trilogy	The Summoning The Awakening The Reckoning	2014
Darkness Rising	The Gathering The Calling The Rising	2014
Otherworld Nights	Demonology Stalked Hidden Twilight Chivalrous Lucifer's Daughter From Russia with Love Vanishing Act	Oct 2014
Gifted	Gabriel’s Gargoyles The Puppy Plan	Nov 2014
Darkest Powers Tales	Dangerous Divided Disenchanted Facing Facts Belonging	Mar 2015
Led Astray	Rakshashi Kat A Haunted House of Her Own Learning Curve The Screams of Dragons The Kitsune's Nine Tales Last Stand Bamboozled Branded The List Young Bloods The Door Dead Flowers by a Roadside Suffer the Children The Collector Gabriel's Gargoyles Harbinger V Plates Life Sentence Plan B The Hunt Dead to Me Devil May Care	Sep 2015
Life Sentence	Life Sentence Last Stand	Nov 2015
Imaginarium 4	Bamboozled	2015
The Year's Best Dark Fantasy and Horror 2015	The Screams of Dragons	2015
Science Fiction World Magazine (China)	The Screams of Dragons	2015
Expiration Date	Sorry Seems to be the Hardest Word	2015
nEvermore!	The Orange Cat	2015
Seize the Night	We Are All Monsters Here	2015
X-Files: The Truth is Out There	Dead Ringers	2015
The Year's Best Dark Fantasy and Horror 2016	The Door	2016
The Best Horror of the Year	We Are All Monsters Here	2016
Urban Allies	Tailed (Note: Collaboration with Seanan McGuire.)	2016
Strangers Among Us	The Culling	2016
Otherworld Secrets	Life After Theft Forbidden Angelic Zen and the Art of Vampirism The Ungrateful Dead Counterfeit Magic	Jan 2016
Otherworld Chills	Brazen Amityville Horrible Chaotic Sorry Seems to be the Hardest Word Off-Duty Angel The Puppy Plan Baby Boom	Oct 2016
Indigo		Jun 2017
Urban Enemies	Hounded	2017
Halloween Carnival Volume 3	The Way Lost	2017
Haunted Nights	Nos Galan Gaeaf	2017
The Complete Darkest Power Tales	Dangerous Divided Disenchanted Facing Facts Belonging The New Guy The Invitation Atoning	Dec 2017
Dark Screams: Volume Nine	Invitation to the Game	2018
The Dame was Trouble	Indispensable	2018
Phantoms: Haunting Tales from Masters of the Genre	The Ghost in the Glade	2018
Hark! The Herald Angels Scream	Angels & Absinthe	2018
Portents: A Collection of Cainsville Tales	The Screams of Dragons Devil May Care Gabriel's Gargoyles Bad Publicity The Orange Cat Matagot The Lady of the Lake	Aug 2018
Ten Word Tragedies	The War Within	2019
Hexed	Black Magic Momma	2019
Life is Short and Then You Die	Floater	2019
Under a Winter Sky	Ballgowns & Butterflies	Nov 2020
Final Cuts	Drunk Physics	2020
Hex on the Beach	Goddess of Summer Love	Jul 2021
Christmas at Thorne Manor	Short fiction from A Stich in Time series: Ballgowns & Butterflies Snowstorms & Sleigh Bells Ghosts & Garlands	2022

== Awards ==
Work	Year & Award	Category	Result	Ref.
Bitten	2001 International Horror Guild Award	First Novel	Nominated	
The Summoning	2009 Sunburst Award	Young Adult	Nominated	
The Summoning	2011 Forest of Reading Red Maple Award	Fiction	Nominated	
Spell Bound	2011 Goodreads Choice Awards	Paranormal Fantasy	Nominated	
Thirteen	2012 Goodreads Choice Awards	Paranormal Fantasy	Nominated	
The Gathering	2012 White Pine Award	Fiction	Won	
The Calling	2013 Aurora Awards	YA Novel	Nominated	
Omens	2013 Goodreads Choice Awards	Paranormal Fantasy	Nominated	
Loki's Wolves	2013 Goodreads Choice Awards	Middle Grade & Children's	Nominated	
Loki's Wolves	2014 Forest of Reading Red Maple Award	Fiction	Nominated	
The Rising	2014 Aurora Awards	YA Novel	Won	
Sea of Shadows	2015 Aurora Awards	YA Novel	Nominated	
Sea of Shadows	2015 Monica Hughes Award		Finalist	
The Unquiet Past	2017 Forest of Reading Red Maple Award	Fiction	Nominated	
City of the Lost	2017 Crime Writers of Canada Awards of Excellence	Novel	Nominated	
The Masked Truth	2017 Arkansas Teen Book Award	Grades 10–12	Nominated	
Wolf's Bane	2020 Aurora Awards	YA Novel	Nominated	
The Gryphon's Lair	2021 Aurora Awards	YA Novel	Nominated	
A Stitch in Time	2021 Aurora Awards	Novel	Nominated	
A Stitch in Time	2021 RITA Award	Long Speculative Romance	Won	
The Serpent's Fury	2022 Aurora Awards	YA Novel	Nominated	
A Royal Guide to Monster Slaying	2022 Young Reader's Choice Award	Junior Division	Nominated	
Lifetime Achievement	2026 Aurora Awards	CSSFA Hall of Fame	Inducted	
