= Hal-Con =

Canadian science fiction convention

Hal-Con Sci-Fi, Fantasy & Comic Convention
- Status: Active
- Genre: Speculative fiction
- Venue: Lord Nelson Hotel (2010), World Trade and Convention Centre (2011–2017), Scotiabank Centre (2015-2017) Halifax Convention Centre (2018-Present)
- Location: Halifax, Nova Scotia
- Country: Canada
- Inaugurated: October 29–31, 2010
- Attendance: Est. 19,000
- Organizer: Hal-Con Sci-Fi Fantasy Association
- Filing status: Not-For-Profit
- Website: http://www.hal-con.com

Hal-Con Sci-Fi, Fantasy & Comic Convention, commonly known as Hal-Con, was founded in the 1970s and revived in the 2010s. It is traditionally an annual weekend event held in Halifax, Nova Scotia in Atlantic Canada during the middle of fall.

Originally showcasing comic books, games, science fiction/fantasy and film/television, and related popular arts, it has grown to encompass the full spectrum of geekdom, including comic books, science fiction, fantasy, gaming, science fantasy, Renaissance, anime, furry, cyber goth, cosplay, and anything else of the fantastical while still having enough appeal for even the most casual fan. The gathering includes entertainment for most tastes from music, stage show, and small social gaming circles, and the chance to rub elbows with the famous and infamous of geek pop-culture.

== Activities and events ==
- Celebrity Q&A sessions
- Autograph and photo booths
- Guest lectures
- Authors readings
- Anime and video rooms
- Artist alley
- Charity auction
- Specialty vendors
- Discussion panels
- Masquerade dance
- Costume contest
- Dressing in costume
- Gaming demonstrations, tournaments and play

== Community involvement ==
=== Year round events ===
Hal-Con is active in the HRM community, promoting both the convention and Geek Culture. They hold events throughout the year leading up to the convention. These events include BBQs, dances, movie nights, game days, and they even participate in local parades and zombie walks with the help of fans.

=== Community parades ===
Hal-Con loves to participate in community celebrations - especially parades. Below is a sample list of the parades and awards won in parades around Halifax Regional Municipality.

- Eastern Passage Summer Carnival Parade – 2012–Present (Award Winner – 2012, 2014, 2015, 2016)
- Chronicle Herald Parade of Lights – 2012–Present (Award Winner – 2012, 2014, 2015)
- HRM Pride Parade – 2012–Present (Award Winner – 2016, 2017)
- Natal Day Parade – 2012–Present (Award Winner – 2013, 2015)
- St. Patrick's Day Parade – 2013-2015 (Award Winner – 2014, 2015)
- Annapolis Valley Apple Blossom Parade with Eastlink – 2014
- Multicultural Festival Parade – 2014
- Sackville Patriots Day Parade – 2014 (Award Winner – 2014)
- Halifax Official Zombie Walk – 2012-2014
- Cole Harbour Harvest Festival Parade – 2012, 2013
- Spryfield Annual Christmas Parade – 2012, 2013 (Award Winner – 2012, 2013)

Hal-Con also hosts and organizes their own Halloween parade (2012–present).

=== Charity ===
Hal-Con is active in charity events. Each year they host a live charity auction at the convention as well as numerous silent auctions with profits going to the IWK Children's Hospital and Kids Help Phone. They also participate with local groups such as Let It Roll, The Board Room Game Cafe, Cape and Cowl Collectibles and Gelatinous Dudes, to help with numerous charity fund-raising events with the funds going to local children groups, IWK Children's Hospital, Kids Help Phone, special needs camps, and Japan Disaster Relief.

In the first five years (2010–2015), they raised over $45,000 for charity.

=== Awards ===
- 2016: The Coast, Best Of: Best Place to Volunteer (Bronze)
- 2015: The Coast, Best Of: Best Place to Volunteer (Silver)
- 2015: Destination Halifax: Spirit of Halifax
- 2014: The Coast, Best Of: Best Festival (Bronze)

== Mascot ==
The Hal-Con mascot is named Nelson, which is a robot shaped like the Halifax Town Clock. The mascot is seen on Hal-Con promotional material and appears at every community event possible, as well as at the convention itself. Since the introduction of the mascot costume Nelson has appeared in numerous parades, played Laser Tag, avoided the undead in the Halifax Zombie Walk, and even ran a 10k marathon for charity.

An origin story for the mascot of Nelson explains how an alien from the planet Teebius named Nee comes to Earth, befriends a mouse named Zipper, makes a home with Zipper in a "Liveable Space Operating Node" (LSON) Robot, and decides to combine his name with the Robot's to become "Nelson".

In 2015 the Hal-Con website was redesigned, and the origin story was not included with the new website. However, on the new website is an entry for Nelson on the Hal-Con About Us web page, which provides a smaller description for the mascot:

Nelson, originally named Nee, is the robot of fun. Hailing from Teebius, Nelson decided his time would be better spent as Hal-Con’s mascot because the world on our side of the galaxy intrigued him more than his own. He grew up watching our TV shows and can quote every line from the gone-too-soon series Seaquest DSV. In his down time, Nelson likes to share a bowl of cereal with his BFF and roommate, a mouse named Zipper.

— "Our Board - Hal-Con"

== Hal-Con history ==
=== The old ===
Hal-Con has a long history in Halifax, and was running annually for many years from the late 1970s through the 1980s. The convention began at Dalhousie University's School of Library Service as HalyCon I, and it was held on March 17, 1977. Then in 1978, the Halcon Science Fiction Society was launched by Bob Atkinson, John Bell, Sheldon Goldman, George Allanson, and Chris Kolovaris and the convention was renamed "Halcon" for Halcon II held March 9–11, 1979. Since Halcon came about as a result of Halycon, the numbering continued from the original event. Halcon II featured Ben Bova and Spider & Jeanne Robinson as guests. Then Halcon 3 was held in 1980 with author A.E. van Vogt as the featured guest, and the convention continued to be held annually until 1987. Halcon 10 was held in 1987 at The Westin Nova Scotian Hotel, and it would be the last Halcon until 2010.

=== The new ===
In 2010 the Hal-Con convention underwent a spiritual revival. The new Halcon, now called "Hal-Con", took the meaning of the old convention, the want to bring like-minded people together for fun, but did it under entirely new management and with modern convention practices. The official organizing committee is made up of volunteers who want nothing more than to make a successful convention in Atlantic Canada. Planning for the 2010 convention began in 2008, and was able to bring in nearly 1500 attendees to the Lord Nelson Hotel in Halifax. Since 2010 the convention has grown steadily, having had to move its venue after its first year, and was in the World Trade and Convention Centre and Scotiabank Centre in downtown Halifax until 2017. In 2018 the convention moved to the Halifax Convention Center, where it is currently held.

== Event history ==
Year	Dates	Location	Attendees	Guests	Additional Info
2010	October 29–31	Lord Nelson Hotel	Est. 1500	Walter Koenig, Denise Crosby, Kevin Murphy, Bill Corbett, PJ Haarsma, Conor McCreery, Drakaina Muse, Kenneth Tam, Ajay Fry, Teddy Wilson, Matthew LeDrew, Ellen Curtis, Sandra Staple, Nina Munteanu, David Rhind	The first convention was well attended, with more people than expected coming through the doors. Actor and wrestler Robert Maillet was also in attendance during the convention. He spent the weekend signing autographs and posing for pictures with fans while enjoying the events at the convention.
2011	November 12–13	World Trade and Convention Centre	Est. 3500	Nicholas Brendon, Erin Gray, JG Hertzler, Robert Maillet, Steve Jackson (US game designer), Debbie Rochon, Faith Erin Hicks, Conor McCreery, Anthony Del Col, Drakaina Muse, Ajay Fry, Teddy Wilson, Matthew LeDrew, Ellen Curtis, Darren Hann, Chantal Boudreau, David Rhind, Fat Apollo	The venue expanded to nearly 30,000sqft and was two floors. Attendance more than doubled, despite the change to a 2-day format. The finalist in the Munchkin tournament will be playing their final match against Munchkin creator Steve Jackson (US game designer). The annual KAG Kanada Grand Assembly was hosted at Hal-Con.
2012	October 26–28	World Trade and Convention Centre	Est. 4700	John Rhys-Davies, René Auberjonois, Nicholas Briggs, Brian Downey, Manu Intiraymi, John Dunsworth, Richard Donat, Ajay Fry, Debbie Rochon, Paul and Storm, Nerd Army, R. A. Salvatore, Geno Salvatore, Brandon Sanderson, Rachel Caine, Alex Bledsoe, C.S. Maccath, Matthew LeDrew, Ellen Curtis, David Rhind, Gail Simone, Steve McNiven, Darwyn Cooke, Conor McCreery, Nick Bradshaw, Larry Hama, Mark Oakley, Geof Isherwood, Francesco Francavilla, Ramón Pérez, Faith Erin Hicks, Mike Holmes, Tim Larade, Andrew Power, Hal Hilden, Joel Duggan, J.R. Faulkner, Jay Paulin, David Cullen, Drakaina Muse, Howard Nash, Fat Apollo	The venue expanded to a third floor and moved back to the 3 day format. Gaming aspect of convention is largest in the Maritimes. There was a concert and a small scale film festival. There was a renewal of wedding vows that was overseen by John Rhys-Davies.
2013	November 8–10	World Trade and Convention Centre	Est. n/a	Billy Dee Williams, Jewel Staite, Peter Davison, Garrett Wang, J. August Richards, David Nykl, Richard Hatch, Vic Mignogna, Ajay Fry, Robert Maillet, Pete Williams, Terry Brooks, Robert J. Sawyer, Shawna Romkey, Matthew LeDrew, Ellen Curtis, David Rhind, Julia Phillips Smith, Christopher Jones, Ty Templeton, Ian Boothby, Tom Fowler, Lar deSouza, Nick Bradshaw, Christopher Torres, Rob DenBleyker, Troy Little, Brenda Hickey, Kelly Tindall, Faith Erin Hicks, Peter Chiykowski, Joel Duggan, Hal Hilden, Robert Bailey, Danica Brine, Jay Paulin, Monte Cook, Wordburglar, Yaya Han, Drakaina Muse, Fat Apollo	The attendance surpassed 2012 numbers, but overcrowding led to the Office of the Fire Marshall to step in and shut down entry, denying entry to hundreds. Refunds were issued to those affected. The cause was due to confusion of the daily passes as the passes themselves were not defined on which day they were for.
2014	November 7–9	World Trade and Convention Centre	Est. 6400	Mark Sheppard, Michelle Forbes, Morena Baccarin, Kristian Nairn, Colin Ferguson, Johnny Yong Bosch, Ross Mullan, Garrett Wang, Jacqueline Carey, Kat Kruger, Shawna Romkey, Dan Parent, J. Torres, Doug Savage, Kate Leth, Kalman Andrasofszky, Richard Comely, Fadi Hakim, Marco Rudy, Nick Bradshaw, Hope Nicholson and Rachel Richey, Gisèle Lagacé, David Lumsdom, Peter Chiykowski, Danica Brine (KARIBU), Riki LeCotey (Riddle), Chris Tulach, Jaqueline Carey, Fat Apollo	A successful fifth year without any overcrowding issues by switching to specific day passes for single day tickets. Chosen by Wizards of the Coast to host an exclusive scenario through the Adventurers League program for the first time called ‘Tyranny in Phlan.’
2015	October 31- November 1	World Trade and Convention Centre and Scotiabank Centre	Est. 8000	Enver Gjokaj, John de Lancie, John Rhys-Davies, Alaina Huffman, Amber Benson, Destiny Nickelsen, Emily Perkins, Kris Holden-Reid, Paul Amos, Kirby Morrow, Lenore Zann, Kelley Armstrong, Jacquelyne Frank, Diane Duane, Peter Moorwood, Joëlle Jones, Mike Rooth, Troy Little, Brenda Hickey, Rob DenBleyker, Jeph Jacques, Vitaly S. Alexius, Richard Comedly, Fadi Hakim, Gavin Buhr, Nathan DeLuca, Fat Apollo	This year expands to add another 20,000+ sq ft to the existing 50,000+ sq ft to the event space. This brought in more artists/exhibitors in addition to increased space for gaming and special activities on site. Ticket prices remained the same, despite the increase in space.
2016	November 4–6	World Trade and Convention Centre and Scotiabank Centre	Est. 8800	Gates McFadden, Toby Proctor, Linda Ballantyne, Jeremy Bulloch, Phil Lamarr, Natalia Tena, Aaron Ashmore, AJ Buckley, Ryan Robbins, Charles de Lint, Maggie Stiefvater, Kevin Hearne, Rob Salkowitz, Julie Czerneda, Ben Templesmith, Tim Seeley, Leonard Kirk, Mike Norton, Jenny Frison, Michael Lacombe, Richard Pace, ossi Gifford, Mike Rooth, Ajay Fry, Fat Apollo, cosplayers Momokun, Nathan Deluca, It's Raining Neon, Becky Mailman. Gaming: Chris Tulach, Rodney Smith.	This year was the last planned for this venue before moving to the new Halifax Convention Convention, however construction delays meant staying in the existing facility.
2017	September 22–24	World Trade and Convention Centre and Scotiabank Centre	Est. 9200	Mitch Pileggi, Elden Hensen, Jim Beaver, Tom Lenk, Pat Mastroianni, Stacie Mistysyn, Stefan Brogen, Kristen Bourne, John Kovalic, Ryan North, Gerhard, Lateef Martin, Conor McCreery, Fernando Ruiz, Gisele Legace, Tony White, Piper Thibodeau, Tamora Pierce, Tanya Huff, Steven Erikson, Amy McKay, Alexander Freed, Tim Hanley, Nicola R. White, Roy Wooley, Margarita Gakis, Ri Care (Cosplay), Kiss a Frog (Cosplay), Panterona (Cosplay), Wuckajuice (Cosplay), Tom Vasel, Rodney Smith.	There were plans for the event to move to the new Halifax Convention Centre, however construction delays meant staying at the World Trade and Convention Centre and Scotiabank Centre. Hal-Con will also host the Prix Aurora Awards this year.
2018	October 26–28	Halifax Convention Centre	15,000	LeVar Burton, John de Lancie, Billy Boyd, Anthony Head, Gareth David-Lloyd, David Yost, Laura Vandervoort, Kurtis Wiebe, Emmanuelle Chateauneuf, Mike Feehan, Mike Rooth, Brenda Hickey, Troy Little, Ed Brisson, Jason Loo, Megan Kearney, Tara Audibert, Lev Grossman, Chuck Wendig, Delilah S. Dawson, Kristen Ciccarelli, Jennifer Maillet, Justin Little, Samantha Mary Beiko, Marc Deveault, Akakioga, Knightmage, Cassie Seaboyer, Linda Zayas-Palmer, Mark Seifter, Jessie Yaternick, Ajay Fry, Tanner Zipchen, Fat Apollo, Rhys Bevan-John, Jamie Bradley	Halifax Convention Centre, growth to ~120,000 sqft), Attendance reported using turnstile numbers
2019	October 25–27	Halifax Convention Centre	Est. 16,000 (turnstile)	Aimee Garcia, John Barrowman, Mark Pellegrino, Dan Fogler, Wes Chatham, Tracy Lynn Cruz, Guy Gavriel Kay, Patricia Briggs, Carole Barrowman, Tanya Dawson, Thea Atkinson, Kyle Higgins, Hope Nicholson, Johnnie Christmas, Renée Nault, Doug Savage, ALB, David J Cutler, Becka Noel, Dhareza Maramis, CutiePieSensei, Dan Morash, FoamWerx, Bradey Lindsay, James Lewell, Ash Barker, Avery Alder, Greg Blackmore, Ajay Fry, Fat Apollo	Halifax Convention Centre
2020	N/A	N/A	N/A	N/A	Due to the COVID-19 pandemic, Hal-Con was forced to cancel in 2020.
2021	October 23-24	Halifax Convention Centre		Jordyn Bochon, Julian Smith, Nick Morris, Conundrum Press, Tim Carpenter, Julian Mortimer Smith, Alison House, Jo Tregiari, Steve Vernon, Brandon Mitchell, Lee Sawler, Rebecca Harrison, Nikki Aucoin, Hilari Ann, Ali House	With some restrictions still in place due to the pandemic, Hal-Con focused on local artists and celebrities this year. Michelle Bryan had to cancel.
2022	October 28-30	Halifax Convention Centre		Cary Elwes, Graham McTavish, Summer Glau, Will Friedle, Gene Ha, Cosplay Chris, Kiss a Frog, Nana Cosplay, Premee Mohamed, Janet Hetherington, Ronn Sutton, Jo Tregiari, TJ Klune, Paul Connolly, Ash Barker, Luis Brueh, Sol Ring MTG, Casey Gilly, Jim Zub, Big Country Comics, John Scalzi, Candance Osmond, DJ MacHale, JJ King, Troy Little, Brenda Hickey, Stephanie Williams, Tanner Zipchen, Matthew John, Leah Clark	Seanan McGuire had to cancel.
2023	October 27-29	Halifax Convention Centre		Chad Michael Murray, Ruth Connell, Tanner Zipchen, Luis Brueh, Rei Kennex, Ash Barker, Dr Lisa Dang, Sarah Myer, James Marsters, Juliet Landau, Piper CJ, Alittleandroid, Sandy Carruthers, Carmen Valentina, SolringMTG, Ed Brisson, Peter J. Foote, Dave McCaig, Adrian Tchaikovsky, Tom Wlaschiha, Arthur Darvill, Twinfools & Nova, Peter Chiykowski, Matt Kindt, Timothy Zahn, Sam Maggs, Oded Fehr	E. K. Johnston was booked but had to cancel.
2024	November 8-10	Halifax Convention Centre	Est. 18,875 (turnstile)	Ben Browder, Ben McKenzie, Chad Michael Murray, Jason Faunt, Jennifer Hale, Julian Richings, Julie Caitlin Brown, Tanner Zipchen, Trailer Park Boys, Ty Olsson, Chris Tulach, Kat Kruger, Stephen Graham Jones, Dax Gordine, Sylvain Neuvel, Brianna June, EK Johnston, Cowbutt Crunchies, Shannon Watters, Ramón Pérez, Gladzy Kei, Jennifer Blackstream, Stephanie Cooke, Jim Butcher, Aicosu, Gavin Guidry, Kelley Armstrong,	Sean Astin and Alan Tudyk were confirmed but had to cancel. Their contracts were signed for 2025 and announced at closing ceremonies.
2025	November 7-9	Halifax Convention Centre	Est. 18,1875 (turnstile)	Wallace Shawn, Sean Astin, Alan Tudyk, Wilson Cruz, Harvey Guillén, David Godfrey, Chad Michael Murray, Morgan Kohan, Diana McCallum, Kevin Hearne, Mary Robinette Kowal, Chuck Wendig, Waubgeshig Rice, Paris Alleyne, James Raiz, Dan Parent, Andrew Thomas, Kate Phillips, Emilia Strilchuk, Sarcasm Hime, Kate Starz, Silent Snugs, Binrand, Proton Jon	Dino Caruso was confirmed for 2025, but had to cancel due to personal issues.
2026	November 6-8	Halifax Convention Centre	Est. 18,875 (turnstile)	Jonathan Frakes, Emily Swallow, Jackson Rathbone, Jason Lee, Ethan Suplee, Peter Facinelli, Kellan Lutz, Andrew Ivimey, T. Kingfisher/Ursula Vernon, P. Djeli Clark, Alex Moore, Natalie Zina Walschots, Elayna R. Gallea, Paul Tremblay, Fonda Lee, Dino Caruso, Eric Olcsvary, Anthony Ruttgaizer, Erica Schultz, Keezy Young, Liana Kangas, Clint McElroy, Alex Rochon, Chanse McCrary, Doll Damage Cosplay, GoBeyond Cosplay. Cast of FROM: Harold Perrineau, Catalina Sandino Moreno, David Alpay, Liz Saunders, Jamie McGuire, Julia Doyle, Shaun Majumder, Katerina Bakolia, Pegah Ghafoori, Nathan Simmons, Angela Moore, Trina Corkum	Photograph and autograph sessions with the cast of FROM was sponsored by Paramount+ and done via lottery.
