= Jed Tavernier =

Canadian television personality

Jedson Tavernier is a Canadian television personality, most noted as an entertainment reporter for Entertainment Tonight Canada.

An alumnus of the University of Western Ontario, where he was a basketball player for the Western Mustangs, he first became known as a competitor in the ninth season of Big Brother Canada in 2021. He joined Entertainment Tonight Canada in 2022, alongside fellow Big Brother alum Britnee Blair, and remained with the program until its cancellation in fall 2023.

Alongside Blair, Cheryl Hickey, Sangita Patel, Carlos Bustamante, Morgan Hoffman and Keshia Chanté, he was a Canadian Screen Award nominee for Best Host, Talk Show or Entertainment News at the 12th Canadian Screen Awards in 2024.
