= List of Bitten episodes =

Bitten is a Canadian television series based on Women of the Otherworld, a series of books by author Kelley Armstrong. Its name was taken from the series' first book. It was produced as an original series for Space. The majority of the filming took place in Hespeler, as well as Hamilton and Toronto, Ontario.

On January 11, 2014, the first episode of season one was aired, and the season's last episode was aired on April 5.

On June 30, 2015, the show was renewed for a third season. It was announced December 9, 2015 that the third season would be the series' last. During the course of the series, 33 episodes of Bitten aired over three seasons.

== Series overview ==
Season	Episodes	Originally released	
Season	Episodes	First released	Last released
1	13	January 11, 2014	April 5, 2014
2	10	February 7, 2015	April 11, 2015
3	10	February 12, 2016	April 15, 2016

== Episodes ==
=== Season 1 (2014) ===
No. overall	No. in season	Title	Directed by	Written by	Original release date	Can. viewers (millions)
1	1	"Summons"	Brad Turner	Daegan Fryklind	January 11, 2014	0.27
Elena, a werewolf trying to live a normal life, is summoned home by Jeremy, the leader of her Pack, when it comes under attack by an unknown enemy. Returning to Stonehaven also means running into her first love, Clayton Danvers, the man who betrayed her by transforming her into a werewolf.
2	2	"Prodigal"	Brad Turner	Daegan Fryklind	January 18, 2014	N/A
Elena tries to keep Clayton at arm's length, but he lets her know he will do whatever it takes to get her back in his life for good. She uses the search for the deadly "mutt" as a distraction from her complicated personal life, but things get worse when a second dead body is found on Stonehaven property.
3	3	"Trespass"	Andy Mikita	Denis McGrath	January 25, 2014	N/A
Elena and Clayton fall back into old patterns from their former relationship, which alarms Elena who wants to forget the past. Together, they track down the Mutt to a warehouse, but find themselves in a sticky situation when it transitions into a wolf.
4	4	"Grief"	Paul Fox	Grant Rosenberg	February 1, 2014	N/A
Elena and Clay must put aside their growing sexual attraction as they team up to discover who wants to transform serial killers into werewolves.
5	5	"Bitten"	Andy Mikita	Daegan Fryklind	February 8, 2014	N/A
Elena is overcome by memories of her love affair with Clayton and his betrayal by changing her into a werewolf. When Clayton is accused of being behind the murders, Elena comes to his defense. Meanwhile, a former Pack member and Clayton's rival returns with information about the Mutt plot.
6	6	"Committed"	Paul Fox	Karen Hill	February 15, 2014	N/A
Elena leaves Stonehaven and returns to Toronto. Daniel Santos follows her and offers a deal by which she can escape the pack. Back in Stonehaven, Jeremy's control over his fellow werewolves is challenged.
7	7	"Stalking"	T. W. Peacocke	Grant Rosenberg	February 22, 2014	N/A
Santos is now revealed as the leader of the Mutt uprising. He requests a meeting with the pack in order to discuss a potential truce. The pack views this as an opportunity to trap the rebelling Mutts; however, the Mutts are one step ahead, which leads to members of the pack being injured.
8	8	"Prisoner"	Grant Harvey	Wil Zmak	March 1, 2014	N/A
Elena figures out that Jeremy was stabbed with a poisoned blade. In order to find out the type of poison used, she tracks down the girl who stabbed Jeremy. Clayton attempts various tactics to get Cain to reveal the location of the Mutts. Although unsuccessful, Cain does reveal that Santos has hired Jimmy Koenig to go after the pack.
9	9	"Vengeance"	John Fawcett	Will Pascoe	March 8, 2014	N/A
Jimmy calls on Jeremy to end the fight "old-school". Both Jimmy and Jeremy struggle to gain the upper hand; however, Jimmy seems the likely winner. Just as Jimmy is about to end Jeremy's life, Nick steps in and kills Jimmy. Elena is attacked by a Mutt. Meanwhile, Philip sees a video of Logan and Elena the night they were on the run, leading him to believe the pair were having an affair. Philip then confronts Logan about his suspicions.
10	10	"Descent"	James Dunnison	Julia Cohen	March 15, 2014	N/A
Elena returns to Toronto for her photography show. Ordered by Jeremy, Clayton accompanies her. Elena is surprised by Philip, who knows her relationship with Clayton is deeper than she has confessed in the past. Philip, curious to get to the bottom of it, insists Clayton stay with them at the apartment. As the two men nurture their own agenda, Elena tries to prevent her two worlds from colliding. At the art show, Elena is blindsided when Victor Olson, her former child abuser, makes a guest appearance. Adding to her terror, he is revealed to be a Mutt. Philip steps in to protect and defend Elena's honor, taking out his frustration and rage on Olson. Outside the gallery, Clayton confronts Santos, threatening to kill him and end the uprising in its tracks. This is witnessed by a horrified Diane. Santos manages to escape just as Olson flees the gallery. The evening ends with Philip demanding the truth about Elena and Clayton's relationship. Elena reveals that the pair were former lovers and also engaged. Philip storms out in anger; Elena feels her world is imploding.
11	11	"Settling"	James Dunnison	Wil Zmak	March 22, 2014	N/A
Clay and Elena are at Philip's apartment, waiting for Jeremy and the pack to arrive. Clayton reveals to Elena that the Mutts are after her. Philip arrives back at his apartment and proposes to Elena. She rebuffs his proposal and secretly sneaks out to seek counsel from Logan. Logan decides to leave the pack, but after being attacked by Karl Marsten and Thomas LeBlanc, he asks Rachel to take him back to Stonehaven. Under James Williams' orders, Santos and Victor head to Philip's apartment in search of Elena. Amidst a fight with Clayton and Philip, Elena changes into her wolf form in order to save Philip from the pair. However, Santos and Olson manage to drug and capture Clayton.
12	12	"Caged"	Kelly Makin	Will Pascoe	March 29, 2014	N/A
Jeremy and Nick meet Elena and convince her to return to Stonehaven to regroup. Meanwhile, Clayton is tortured by Santos and his group of Mutts. Santos reveals his original intention was to capture Elena and use her as a pawn to force Jeremy to relinquish his control as Alpha, as ordered by James Williams. Rachel brings Logan to Stonehaven, where Jeremy helps him recuperate from his injuries. Jeremy imprisons Elena to prevent her from meeting up with Santos. When he leaves to search for Santos, Logan frees Elena, and she eventually meets up with Santos, who tells her his demands. Santos wants to mate with Elena in exchange for Clayton's freedom. She captures Victor Olson and forces him to reveal where the Mutts are hiding Clayton. Elena then kills him and frees Clayton; together they escape the Mutts. Jeremy reveals to Elena that Clayton bit her in order to stop him from killing her.
13	13	"Ready"	TJ Scott	Daegan Fryklind	April 5, 2014	N/A
James Williams directs Santos to recruit more Mutts to attack Stonehaven. Logan takes Rachel to a motel and leaves her there in hopes of keeping her away from the upcoming battle. Tired of waiting, Rachel leaves the motel and is captured by the Mutts, who use her as a decoy to commence the fight. Just before the battle, Jeremy tells Nick that he knows where his mother is located. Logan returns Stonehaven to help Jeremy and the rest of the pack fight the Mutts. Elena is captured by LeBlanc, but is saved by Marsten, who has had a change of heart. Believing the Mutts have the upper hand, Williams and Santos enter Stonehaven. Williams then disappears and Santos is cornered by the Pack. Elena kills Santos. The pack defeat the Mutts, but instead of admitting defeat, Williams confronts Jeremy and reveals his intention to take Elena. Amidst the chaos, Rachel is kidnapped by Williams, who turns out to be Malcolm Danvers, Jeremy's father. Later, Elena returns to her room and puts on the engagement ring Clayton had given her. Turning around, she discovers the severed head of Philip in her bed and screams.

=== Season 2 (2015) ===
No. overall	No. in season	Title	Directed by	Written by	Original release date	Can. viewers (millions)
14	1	"Bad Blood"	Grant Harvey	Daegan Fryklind	February 7, 2015	0.40
While Elena and the pack hunt for Malcolm, the Council of International Alphas tells Jeremy to kill Malcolm or lose control over North America. Logan searches on his own for Rachel and plans to go underground after finding her.
15	2	"Scare Tactics"	Jeremiah Chechik	Wil Zmak	February 14, 2015	N/A
While the pack interrogates Malcolm, Clay investigates a mysterious symbol and learns more about his past. The pack discovers a coven of witches whose agenda conflicts with the pack's plans.
16	3	"Hell's Teeth"	James Dunnison	Michael MacLennan	February 21, 2015	N/A
After the witches steal Malcolm, the pack learns that he is bait to retrieve Savannah, a twelve year old girl. The pack and the coven reluctantly join forces against a common threat, which causes the witches to lose a member, Malcolm to finally die, and Elena to be kidnapped. In a flash back, we see the day that Savannah is stolen from home in front of Paige.
17	4	"Dead Meat"	James Dunnison	Jenn Engels	February 28, 2015	N/A
Elena was abducted by a powerful cult, the same one holding Savannah, and is subjected to painful tests. One test includes almost deafening her. Elena bonds somewhat with Savannah. Meanwhile, the witches and the pack decide to use dark magic to find Savannah and Elena. At the same time, Logan finds Rachel and they try to leave.
18	5	"Rabbit Hole"	Bruce McDonald	Daegan Fryklind	March 7, 2015	N/A
Elena fights to stay alive while the pack and the coven try to unravel the mystery of Aleister's identity and the location of his compound. In a flashback, Dr. Bauer is seen meeting Aleister. Meanwhile, Rachel is seemingly brainwashed until she is not. She manages to remove the brands from everyone, but not permanently. She goes looking for Logan.
19	6	"Nine Circles"	Bradley Walsh	Wil Zmak	March 14, 2015	N/A
Aleister uses magic to turn Elena's darkest fears against her. Meanwhile, Clay and Paige fight each other while searching for the cult's compound. Logan and Rachel escape the compound. In a flashback, we see the day that Ruth gave birth to Aleister.
20	7	"Bad Dreams"	J.B. Sugar	Larry Bambrick	March 21, 2015	N/A
The pack rallies around Jeremy when the Spanish alpha tries to blackmail him into killing the Russian alpha, but Savannah's visit derails their plans. Meanwhile, the Spanish alpha hires Marsten to kill Jeremy.
21	8	"Dark Arts"	Rick Bota	Michael MacLennan	March 28, 2015	N/A
Trapping Clay's mind in its own subconscious, Aleister possesses his body and infiltrates Stonehaven in a bid to kidnap Savannah. Meanwhile, Elena and the pack learn a dangerous way to get rid of Aleister, with some consequences for Clay.
22	9	"Scavenger's Daughter"	Grant Harvey	Garfield Lindsay Miller & Wil Zmak	April 4, 2015	N/A
Searching for Aleister, Elena and her cohorts discover his nefarious plans for Savannah with his helper Clara. Ruth has another plan for vanquishing Aleister. Logan meets with Rachel, and because of her lies, joins a fight club and fights with Zachary Cain.
23	10	"Fine Temporum"	TJ Scott	Daegan Fryklind	April 11, 2015	N/A
Elena and the pack provoke a final showdown with Aleister, storming the Delphi building to save Savannah, the witches, and the werewolves.

=== Season 3 (2016) ===
No. overall	No. in season	Title	Directed by	Written by	Original release date	Can. viewers (millions)
24	1	"Family, Of Sorts"	David Wellington	Daegan Fryklind	February 12, 2016	N/A
Willing to strengthen the pack’s power, Jeremy tasks Clay, Elena, and Nick with recruiting North American mutts, but the attack of a werewolf hunter forces them to change their plans. Elena is approached by an actual werewolf family, whose father reveals something shocking to her.
25	2	"Our Own Blood"	David Wellington	Jenn Engels	February 19, 2016	N/A
Elena does not know what to make of the mysterious werewolf, Sasha, when he claims to be her father. Meanwhile, Clay readies Stonehaven for a possible attack from the Spanish by recruiting new Pack members.
26	3	"Right Behind You"	James Dunnison	Wil Zmak	February 26, 2016	N/A
More of Roman's soldiers descend on Bear Valley as Elena struggles to convince Jeremy to protect her blood family against the Russian Alpha on a quest to kill Sasha. Meanwhile, Nick investigates what Roman and his werewolves have planned.
27	4	"A Quiet Dog"	James Dunnison	Larry Bambrick	March 4, 2016	N/A
Jeremy attempts to broker a deal to end the 30-year blood feud between Sasha and Roman. Meanwhile, Elena watches over Pack prisoner Konstantin, who tries to determine her motives for protecting Sasha.
28	5	"Of Sonders Weight"	J.B. Sugar	Daegan Fryklind	March 11, 2016	N/A
Jeremy faces the fallout of failed negotiations between Roman and Sasha. Sasha tells Elena the truth about abandoning her 30 years ago as she nurses him back to health. Meanwhile, Clay and Alexei track down the victim of a young wolf's attack.
29	6	"Rule of Anger"	John Stead	Wil Zmak	March 18, 2016	N/A
Elena and Clay team up against a deadly new foe as they attempt to save the imprisoned Marsten. At the same time, Paige and Nick work together to figure out what is causing the magical outbreaks from Rachel's baby; Katia does something desperate to save her family.
30	7	"On the Brink"	James Dunnison	Garfield Lindsay Miller	March 25, 2016	N/A
Nick, Paige, and Rachel use magic to track Katia after she kidnaps baby Rocco. Elena asks Konstantin to meet with her at Stonehaven to discuss ending the blood feud and calling off the Russian assassin. Only more bloodshed results from Clay and Jorge keeping an eye on the Albino.
31	8	"Tili Tili Bom"	James Dunnison	Larry Bambrick and Jenn Engels	April 1, 2016	N/A
Jeremy abdicates his position and acknowledges Elena as the new Alpha. Elena and Clay attempt to trap and kill the Albino, but he escapes. Nick and Katia are captured by two of Roman's men and taken to a farm to await the Albino. Jeremy plans to infiltrate Roman's compound with the intent to kill him so that Konstantin will be able to call off the blood feud. Nick and Katia escape but, while walking down a road, a pickup stops, and the Albino steps out and kills Katia.
32	9	"Shock the System"	Nathaniel Goodman	Wil Zmak	April 8, 2016	N/A
The pack pledges loyalty to Elena. Sasha and Alexei go to bury Katia. They argue and Sasha and runs off, vowing to get revenge. Elena and Sasha chase an attacker and split up, tracking the Albino's scent. Nick tracks Elena and Sasha through their phones but the signals disappear. Roman has captured Jeremy. Konstantin persuades his father not to kill him. Roman tells Jeremy he must confess that he and Sasha lured Roman to Stonehaven to kill him to allow Sasha to replace him. Jeremy agrees after Roman shows the Albino torturing Elena and Sasha. Jeremy hints to Nick where Elena and Sasha are. Konstantin sends the other Russians away and lets Elena's pack into Roman's estate. He frees Jeremy, who kills Roman. Nick sends Clay and Alexei to rescue Elena and Sasha. Clay attacks the Albino. At Stonehaven, Konstantin tells the Russian pack that Jeremy killed Roman and they are avenged. Back at the warehouse, the Albino's twin brother stands by his body, pledging to seek vengeance on the packs.
33	10	"Truth, Changes, Everything"	Nathaniel Goodman	Daegan Fryklind	April 15, 2016	N/A
Konstantin's pack kills Marsten and Anson while Cain escapes. Elena, Clay, Sasha, and Alexei hide in an old factory. Jeremy and Nick are locked in Stonehaven's basement. Konstantin declares his plan to take over and become the only Alpha in a worldwide pack. Realizing that Jeremy abdicated his alpha status to Elena and therefore killing him or getting his submission will not get him the power he wants, Konstantin sends Nick to Elena to try to entice her to surrender in front of the Russian pack in order to save everyone's lives. Instead, Elena, Clay, and Alexei attack the guards at Stonehaven. Meanwhile, Jeremy breaks free only to get captured moments later by the Albino twin. He leads Jeremy into the woods outside while Clay and Alexei see them and follow. They make it to the woods just in time to see Jeremy break free and rush the Albino Twin, only to get stabbed in the eye for his efforts. Clay attacks while Alexei tends to Jeremy's injury. The Albino twin overpowers Clay and ties a rope around him. Then he senses Alexei nearby and taunts him with details of killing his mother and sister. Alexei surprises everyone by killing the Albino twin with a hook thrown directly to the forehead (mastering a skill that Sasha had previously taught him). While all of this is going on, some of the Russian pack try to kill Nick and Rachel in their safehouse in order to steal Rachel's baby. However, Rachel finally masters her magic and uses it to kill one attacker while Nick kills the other in a fight. Elena talks to Konstantin to try and make peace. Unbeknownst to Konstantin, Elena has initiated a plan to tell the world about werewolves. While she is talking to Konstantin, Sasha and Paige crash the mayor of Bear Valley's press conference. As planned, Sasha changes into a wolf on stage in front of everybody, and in the chaos a police officer shoots and kills him. Now the world knows about the existence of werewolves, much to Konstantin's dismay. Elena warns Konstantin that if he harms her or any of her pack, the world will know about what he is and he will be prosecuted for murder. Konstantin has no choice but to take his pack and return to Russia and never interact with Elena or her pack ever again. Finally, as dictated by her recurring visions, Elena burns down Stonehaven with Jeremy's blessing in order to destroy the records of werewolf bloodlines, names and locations. The surviving pack members are free to live their individual lives and choose their own destinies.

== Specials ==
=== Season 3 Special ===
No.	Title	Hosts	Directed by	Original release date
1	"InnerSpace Presents: Bitten Season 3 Special"	Ajay Fry, Teddy Wilson and Morgan Hoffman	Steve Vogt	February 19, 2016

=== InnerSpace: After Bite ===
A live after-show titled InnerSpace: After Bite premiered on Space on February 7, 2015, following the season two premiere. After Bite features hosts Ajay Fry, Morgan Hoffman and Teddy Wilson discussing the latest episode with actors and producers of Bitten. It only had one season.

No.	Title	Guests	Original release date
1	"Episode 1"	Laura Vandervoort and Greyston Holt	February 7, 2015
2	"Episode 2"	Tommie-Amber Pirie and Tammy Isbell	February 14, 2015
3	"Episode 3"	Greg Bryk and James McGowan	February 21, 2015
4	"Episode 4"	Kiara Glasco and Genelle Williams	February 28, 2015
5	"Episode 5"	Daegan Fryklind and Boris Mojsovski	March 7, 2015
6	"Episode 6"	Sean Rogerson	March 14, 2015
7	"Episode 7"	Greg Bryk, Steve Lund and J.B. Sugar	March 21, 2015
8	"Episode 8"	Steve Lund	March 28, 2015
9	"Episode 9"	Greg Bryk, Genelle Williams, and Michael Xavier	April 4, 2015
10	"Episode 10"	Laura Vandervoort, Greyston Holt, Grek Bryk, Steve Lund, Michael Xavier, Tammy Isbell, Tommie-Amber Pirie, Kiara Glasco, J.B. Sugar and Daegan Fryklind	April 11, 2015
