= Carlos Bustamante (TV personality) =

Canadian television personality

Carlos Bustamante is a Canadian television personality, and formerly an entertainment reporter for Entertainment Tonight Canada from 2017, to the show's cancellation in 2023.

== Biography ==
Born in Manila, Philippines, Carlos moved to Canada at a young age, with his family first settling in Calgary, Alberta. After a few years, his family lived between Vancouver and Toronto. Carlos was a tap dancer in his youth.

He was a host of programming for YTV, including The Zone from 2002 to 2018 and The Next Star.

== Personal life ==
Carlos lives in Burlington, Ontario. He is married and has two children.

== Awards ==
Carlos won the Canadian Screen Award for Best Host in a Pre-School, Children's or Youth Program or Series at the 2nd Canadian Screen Awards in 2014 for The Next Star, and was a nominee in the same category at the 3rd Canadian Screen Awards in 2015.

He was a dual nominee at the 10th Canadian Screen Awards in 2022, for Host of a Talk Show or Entertainment News Program alongside Cheryl Hickey and Sangita Patel for the ET Canada Favourite Canadian Countdown, and Host in a Web Program or Series alongside Hickey, Patel, Roz Weston, Keshia Chanté, and Morgan Hoffman for ET Canada Live.
