= Morgan Hoffman =

Morgan Hoffman may refer to:

- Morgan Hoffmann, American golfer
- Morgan Hoffman (journalist), Canadian television reporter
