= List of awards and nominations received by Supernatural =

Supernatural awards and nominations
Awards and nominations
Award	Wins	Nominations
Constellation Awards	18	39
Critics' Choice Super Awards	1	3
EWwy Awards	2	2
Fangoria Chainsaw Awards	0	1
GLAAD Media Awards	0	3
Golden Reel Awards	0	4
Leo Awards	4	13
People's Choice Awards	9	24
Primetime Emmy Awards	0	3
Rondo Hatton Classic Horror Awards	0	5
Saturn Awards	0	8
SFX Awards	4	16
Teen Choice Awards	2	22
TV Guide Awards	4	4
Young Artist Awards	2	8

Totals (Note: Certain award groups do not simply award one winner. They acknowledge several different recipients, have runners-up, and have third place. Since this is a specific recognition and is different from losing an award, runner-up mentions are considered wins in this award tally. For simplification and to avoid errors, each award in this list has been presumed to have had a prior nomination.)
- Wins: 31
- Nominations: 154

Supernatural is an American fantasy horror television series created by Eric Kripke. It was first broadcast on September 13, 2005, on The WB, and subsequently became part of successor The CW's lineup. Starring Jared Padalecki as Sam Winchester and Jensen Ackles as Dean Winchester, the series follows the two brothers as they hunt demons, ghosts, monsters, and other supernatural beings in the world.

== Constellation Awards ==
The Constellation Awards is a set of Canadian awards given annually for the best science fiction or fantasy works and achievements of the previous year. Supernatural has received two awards from their thirty-nine nominations.

Year	Nominee / work	Award	Result	Ref.
2007	Supernatural	Best Science Fiction Television Series of 2006	Nominated	
2007	Supernatural	Outstanding Canadian Contribution to Science Fiction Film or Television in 2006	Nominated	
2007	Jensen Ackles	Best Male Performance in a 2006 Science Fiction Television Episode (for "In My Time of Dying")	Nominated	
2007	Jared Padalecki	Best Male Performance in a 2006 Science Fiction Television Episode (for "Croatoan")	Nominated	
2007	Serge Ladoucer	Best Technical Accomplishment in a 2006 Science Fiction Film or TV Production – Cinematography	Nominated	
2007	EntityFX	Best Technical Accomplishment in a 2006 Science Fiction Film or TV Production – Visual Effects	Nominated	
2007	Eric Kripke	Best Overall 2006 Science Fiction Film or Television Script (for "In My Time of Dying")	Nominated	
2008	Supernatural	Best Science Fiction Television Series of 2007	Nominated	
2008	Supernatural	Outstanding Canadian Contribution to Science Fiction Film or Television in 2007	Nominated	
2008	Jensen Ackles	Best Male Performance in a 2007 Science Fiction Television Episode (for "What Is and what Should Never Be")	Nominated	
2008	Jared Padalecki	Best Male Performance in a 2007 Science Fiction Television Episode (for "Born Under a Bad Sign")	Nominated	
2008	Raelle Tucker	Best Overall 2007 Science Fiction Film or Television Script (for "What Is and What Should Never Be")	Won	
2009	Supernatural	Best Science Fiction Television Series Of 2008	Nominated	
2009	Supernatural	Outstanding Canadian Contribution to Science Fiction Film/TV	Nominated	
2009	Jensen Ackles	Best Male Performance in a 2008 Science Fiction Television Episode (for "In the Beginning")	Nominated	
2009	Jeremy Carver	Best Overall 2008 Science Fiction Film or Television Script (for "In the Beginning")	Nominated	
2009	Serge Ladoucer	Best Technical Accomplishment in a Film or TV Production – Cinematography (for "Monster Movie")	Nominated	
2010	Supernatural	Best Science Fiction Television Series of 2009	Won	
2010	Jensen Ackles	Best Male Performance in a 2009 Science Fiction Television Episode (for "The End")	Nominated	
2010	Misha Collins	Best Male Performance in a 2009 Science Fiction Television Episode (for "The Rapture")	Nominated	
2010	Alona Tal	Best Female Performance in a 2009 Science Fiction Television Episode (for "Abandon All Hope")	Nominated	
2011	Supernatural	Best Science Fiction Television Series of 2010	Nominated	
2012	Supernatural	Best Science Fiction Television Series of 2011	Nominated	
2012	Supernatural	Outstanding Canadian Contribution to Science Fiction Film or Television in 2011	Nominated	
2012	Misha Collins	Best Male Performance in a 2011 Science Fiction Television Episode (for "The French Mistake")	Nominated	
2012	Jim Beaver	Best Male Performance in a 2011 Science Fiction Television Episode (for "Death's Door")	Nominated	
2012	Ben Edlund	Best Overall 2011 Science Fiction Film or Television Script (for "The French Mistake")	Nominated	
2012	Ivan Hayden	Best Technical Accomplishment in a 2011 Science Fiction Film or Television Production – Visual Effects (for "Meet the New Boss")	Nominated	
2013	Supernatural	Best Science Fiction Television Series of 2012	Nominated	
2013	Supernatural	Outstanding Canadian Contribution to Science Fiction Film or Television in 2012	Nominated	
2013	Supernatural	Best Technical Accomplishment in a 2012 Science Fiction Film or TV Production – Visual Effects	Nominated	
2013	Supernatural	Best Overall Science Fiction Film or Television Script	Nominated	
2013	Jared Padalecki	Best Male Performance in a 2012 Science Fiction Television Episode (for "The Born-Again Identity")	Nominated	
2013	Jensen Ackles	Best Male Performance in a 2012 Science Fiction Television Episode (for "We Need To Talk About Kevin")	Nominated	
2013	Felicia Day	Best Female Performance in a 2012 Science Fiction Television Episode (for "The Girl With The Dungeons And Dragons Tattoo")	Nominated	
2014	Supernatural	Best Science Fiction Television Series of 2013	Nominated	
2014	Jeremy Carver	Best Overall 2013 Science Fiction Film or Television Script (for "Sacrifice")	Nominated	
2014	Mark Meloche	Best Technical Accomplishment in a 2013 Science Fiction Film or Television Production	Nominated	
2014	Felicia Day	Best Female Performance in a 2013 Science Fiction Television Episode (for "Pac-Man Fever")	Nominated	

== Critics' Choice Super Awards ==
The Critics' Choice Super Awards is an awards show presented annually by the Critics Choice Association to honor the finest in genre fiction film, television and home media releases, including action, superhero, horror, science fiction, fantasy and animation releases. They were first established in 2020, with the inaugural ceremony taking place on January 10, 2021, virtually, due to the COVID-19 pandemic. Supernatural has won one award from three nominations.

Year	Nominee / work	Award	Result
2020	Supernatural	Best Horror Series	Nominated
2020	Jensen Ackles	Best Actor in a Horror Series	Won
2020	Jared Padalecki	Best Actor in a Horror Series	Nominated

== EWwy Awards ==
The EWwy Awards is a television production award created by Entertainment Weekly to honor worthy actors and series not nominated for the Primetime Emmys. Jensen Ackles has received all two awards from his nominations for his work as Dean Winchester.

Year	Nominee / work	Award	Result
2008	Jensen Ackles	Best Actor in a Drama Series	Won
2010	Jensen Ackles	Best Actor in a Drama Series	Won

== Fangoria Chainsaw Awards ==
The Fangoria Chainsaw Awards is an award ceremony that goes out to horror films and thriller films. Supernatural has received one nomination.

Year	Nominee / work	Award	Result
2006	Supernatural	Killer Television	Nominated

== GLAAD Media Awards ==
The GLAAD Media Awards is an accolade bestowed by the Gay & Lesbian Alliance Against Defamation (GLAAD) to recognize and honor various branches of the media for their outstanding representations of the lesbian, gay, bisexual and transgender (LGBT) community and the issues that affect their lives. Supernatural has received three nominations.

Year	Nominee / work	Award	Result
2009	Supernatural	Outstanding Individual Episode (in a series without a regular LGBT character) (for "Ghostfacers")	Nominated
2010	Supernatural	Outstanding Individual Episode (in a series without a regular LGBT character) (for "The Real Ghostbusters")	Nominated
2014	Supernatural	Outstanding Individual Episode (in a series without a regular LGBT character) (for "LARP and the Real Girl")	Nominated

== Golden Reel Awards ==
The Golden Reel Awards is presented annually by the Motion Picture Sound Editors (MPSE) to sound editors. Supernatural has received four nominations.

Year	Nominee / work	Award	Result
2006	Michael E. Lawshe (Supervising Sound Editor), Timothy A. Cleveland (Sound Editor/Sound Designer), Adam Johnston (Sound Editor/Sound Designer), Marc Meyer (Sound Editor/Sound Designer), Paul J. Diller (Sound Editor), David Lynch (Sound Editor), Brian Risner (Sound Editor), Stuart Calderon (Sound Editor/Foley Editor), Casey J. Crabtree (Foley Artist), Michael Crabtree (Foley Artist)	Best Sound Editing in Television: Short Form – Sound Effects and Foley (for "Pilot")	Nominated
2007	Michael E. Lawshe (Supervising Sound Editor), Marc Meyer (Sound Designer), Jackie Crabtree (Supervising Foley Editor), Casey J. Crabtree (Foley Artist), Michael Crabtree (Foley Artist), Monette Beck (Foley Artist), Jason Oliver (Sound Effects Editor)	Best Sound Editing in Television: Short Form – Sound Effects and Foley (for "Salvation")	Nominated
2008	Michael E. Lawshe (Supervising Sound Editor), Marc Meyer (Sound Designer), Paul J. Diller (Sound Editor), Norval D. Crutcher, III (Supervising Sound Editor), Stuart Calderon (Sound Editor), Timothy A. Cleveland (Sound Editor), Davide Lynch (Sound Editor), Casey J. Crabtree (Foley Artist), Michael Crabtree (Foley Artist)	Best Sound Editing in Television: Short Form – Sound Effects and Foley (for "All Hell Breaks Loose, Part 2")	Nominated
2011	Monette Melvin (Foley Artist), Rick Owens (Foley Artist), Michael E. Lawshe (Supervising Sound Editor), Marc Meyer (Sound Designer), Trevor Sperry (Supervising Foley Editor), Paul J. Diller (Sound Editor), Norval D. Crutcher, III (Supervising Sound Editor), Timothy A. Cleveland (Sound Editor)	Best Sound Editing in Television: Short Form – Sound Effects and Foley (for "Point of No Return")	Nominated

== Leo Awards ==
The Leo Awards is the awards program for the British Columbia film and television industry. Supernatural has received four awards from their thirteen nominations.

Year	Nominee / work	Award	Result
2008	Jessica Harmon	Best Guest Performance by a Female in a Dramatic Series (for "All Hell Breaks Loose, Part 1")	Nominated
2009	Mandy Playdon	Best Guest Performance by a Female in a Dramatic Series (for "Family Remains")	Nominated
2011	Ivan Hayden, Grant Lindsay	Best Visual Effects in a Dramatic Series (for "Hammer of the Gods")	Won
2011	Matt Frewer	Best Guest Performance by a Male in a Dramatic Series (for "Two Minutes to Midnight")	Nominated
2012	Ivan Hayden, Grant Lindsay	Best Visual Effects in a Dramatic Series (for "Meet the New Boss")	Nominated
2013	Patricia Hargreaves	Best Costume Design in a Dramatic Series (for "Of Grave Importance")	Nominated
2014	Mark Meloche, Grant Lindsay, Christopher Richardson, Trevor Chong, Kevin Genzel	Best Visual Effects in a Dramatic Series (for "Sacrifice")	Won
2015	Brianna Buckmaster	Best Guest Performance by a Female in a Dramatic Series (for "Hibbing 911")	Won
2016	Mark Meloche, Grant Lindsay, Adam Williams, Christopher Richardson, Mladen Miholijcic	Best Visual Effects in a Dramatic Series (for "O Brother Where Art Thou?")	Nominated
2016	Mark Meloche, Grant Lindsay, Christopher Richardson, Mladen Miholijcic, Cory Virs	Best Visual Effects in a Dramatic Series (for "Brother's Keeper")	Nominated
2016	Charmaine Clark	Best Hairstyling in a Dramatic Series (for "The Werther Project")	Won
2018	Rob Hayter	Best Stunt Coordination in a Dramatic Series (for "Lost and Found")	Nominated
2018	Seth Isaac Johnson	Best Guest Performance by a Male in a Dramatic Series (for "Advanced Thanatology")	Nominated

== People's Choice Awards ==
The People's Choice Awards is an American awards show, recognizing the people and the work of popular culture, voted on by the general public. Supernatural has received nine awards from their twenty-three nominations.

Year	Nominee / work	Award	Result
2009	Supernatural	Favorite Sci-Fi/Fantasy Show	Nominated
2010	Supernatural	Favorite Sci-Fi/Fantasy Show	Won
2011	Supernatural	Favorite Sci-Fi/Fantasy Show	Nominated
2012	Supernatural	Favorite Network TV Drama	Won
2012	Supernatural	Favorite Sci-Fi/Fantasy Show	Won
2013	Supernatural	Favorite Sci-Fi/Fantasy Show	Won
2013	Supernatural	Favorite TV Fan Following	Won
2013	Jared Padalecki	Favorite Dramatic TV Actor	Nominated
2013	Jensen Ackles	Favorite Dramatic TV Actor	Nominated
2014	Supernatural	Favorite Sci-Fi/Fantasy Show	Nominated
2014	Jared Padalecki, Jensen Ackles, Misha Collins	Favorite TV Bromance	Won
2014	Jared Padalecki	Favorite Sci-Fi/Fantasy TV Actor	Nominated
2014	Jensen Ackles	Favorite Sci-Fi/Fantasy TV Actor	Nominated
2015	Supernatural	Favorite Network Sci-Fi/Fantasy TV Show	Nominated
2015	Jared Padalecki	Favorite Sci-Fi/Fantasy TV Actor	Nominated
2015	Jensen Ackles	Favorite Sci-Fi/Fantasy TV Actor	Nominated
2015	Misha Collins	Favorite Sci-Fi/Fantasy TV Actor	Won
2015	Jared Padalecki and Jensen Ackles	Favorite TV Duo	Nominated
2016	Supernatural	Favorite Network Sci-Fi/Fantasy	Nominated
2016	Jensen Ackles	Favorite Sci-Fi/Fantasy TV Actor	Won
2016	Misha Collins	Favorite Sci-Fi/Fantasy Actor	Nominated
2017	Supernatural	Favorite Network Sci-Fi/Fantasy Show	Won
2018	Supernatural	Sci-Fi/Fantasy Show of 2018	Nominated
2020	Supernatural	Sci-Fi/Fantasy Show of 2020	Nominated

== Primetime Emmy Awards ==
The Primetime Emmy Awards is an American accolade bestowed by the Academy of Television Arts & Sciences in recognition of excellence in American primetime television programming. Supernatural has received three nominations.

Year	Nominee / work	Award	Result
2006	Christopher Lennertz	Outstanding Music Composition for a Series (Original Dramatic Score)	Nominated
2006	Michael Lawshe (Supervising Sound Editor), Timothy Cleveland (Sound Effects Editor), Paul J. Diller (Sound Effects Editor), Marc Meyer (Sound Effects Editor), David Lynch (Sound Effects Editor), Jessica Dickson (Dialogue Editor), Karyn Foster (Dialog/ADR Editor), Chris McGeary (Music Editor), David Lee Fein (Foley Artist), Jody Thomas (Foley Artist)	Outstanding Sound Editing for a Series	Nominated
2008	Michael Lawshe (Supervising Sound Editor), Norval "Charlie" Crutcher, III (Supervising ADR Editor), Karyn Foster (Dialogue Editor), Marc Meyer (Supervising Sound Effects Editor), Timothy Cleveland (Sound Effects Editor), Paul Diller (Sound Effects Editor), Albert Gomez (Sound Effects Editor), Casey Crabtree (Foley Artist), Michael Crabtree (Foley Artist), Dino Moriana (Music Editor)	Outstanding Sound Editing (for "Jus in Bello")	Nominated

== Rondo Hatton Classic Horror Awards ==
The Rondo Hatton Classic Horror Awards is an award presented annually by the Classic Horror Film Board to honor outstanding works in horror in film, television, home video, and publishing, voted on by the general public. Supernatural has received five nominations.

Year	Nominee / work	Award	Result
2009	Supernatural	Best Television Presentation (for "In the Beginning")	Nominated
2010	Supernatural	Best Television Presentation (for "The End")	Nominated
2011	Supernatural	Best Television Presentation (for "Live Free or Twihard")	Nominated
2011	Supernatural	Best Television Presentation (for "My Heart Will Go On")	Nominated
2013	Supernatural	Best Television Presentation (for "Party On, Garth")	Nominated

== Saturn Awards ==
The Saturn Awards is an award presented annually by the Academy of Science Fiction, Fantasy and Horror Films to honor the top works mainly in science fiction, fantasy, horror in film, television, and home video. Supernatural has received eight nominations.

Year	Nominee / work	Award	Result
2006	Supernatural	Best Network Television Series	Nominated
2008	Supernatural	Best Network Television Series	Nominated
2009	Supernatural	Best Network Television Series	Nominated
2011	Supernatural	Best Network Television Series	Nominated
2012	Supernatural	Best Network Television Series	Nominated
2013	Supernatural	Best Network Television Series	Nominated
2014	Supernatural	Best Youth-Oriented Television Series	Nominated
2015	Supernatural	Best Youth-Oriented Television Series	Nominated
2019	Supernatural	Best Horror Television Series	Nominated

== SFX Awards ==
The SFX Awards celebrates the previous year's achievements in science fiction and are voted on by the readers of the SFX magazine. Supernatural has received four awards from their sixteen nominations.

Year	Nominee / work	Award	Result
2007	Jensen Ackles	Best TV Actor	Nominated
2008	Supernatural	Best TV Show	Nominated
2008	Jared Padalecki	Best TV Actor	Nominated
2010	Supernatural	Best TV Show	Won
2010	Robert Singer (Director), Julie Siege (Writer)	Best TV Episode (for "Criss Angel is a Douchebag")	Nominated
2011	Supernatural	Best TV Show	Nominated
2011	Eric Kripke (Writer), Steve Boyum (Director), Eric 'Giz' Gewirtz (Story By)	Best TV Episode (for "Swan Song")	Nominated
2013	Supernatural	Best TV Show	Won
2013	Supernatural	Best TV Episode (for "Hunteri Heroici")	Won
2013	Jared Padalecki	Best TV Actor	Nominated
2013	Jensen Ackles	Best TV Actor	Nominated
2013	Misha Collins	Best TV Actor	Nominated
2013	Jensen Ackles	Sexiest Man	Won
2013	Jared Padalecki	Sexiest Man	Nominated
2013	Misha Collins	Sexiest Man	Nominated
2013	Mark A. Sheppard	Best Villain	Nominated

== Teen Choice Awards ==
The Teen Choice Awards is an annual awards show that airs on the Fox television network. Supernatural has received two awards from their twenty-two nominations. After much delay, in 2015, Jared Padalecki won "Choice TV Actor: Fantasy/Sci-Fi", and Jensen Ackles and Misha Collins won "Choice TV: Chemistry".

Year	Nominee / work	Award	Result
2006	Supernatural	Choice Breakout Show	Nominated
2006	Jensen Ackles	Choice TV: Breakout Star	Nominated
2007	Jared Padalecki	Choice TV: Drama Actor	Nominated
2010	Supernatural	Choice TV: Fantasy/Sci-Fi Show	Nominated
2011	Supernatural	Choice TV: Fantasy/Sci-Fi Show	Nominated
2011	Jared Padalecki	Choice TV: Sci-Fi/Fantasy Actor	Nominated
2012	Supernatural	Choice TV: Sci-Fi/Fantasy Show	Nominated
2012	Jensen Ackles	Choice TV: Sci-Fi/Fantasy Actor	Nominated
2012	Jared Padalecki	Choice TV: Sci-Fi/Fantasy Actor	Nominated
2013	Supernatural	Choice TV: Sci-Fi/Fantasy Show	Nominated
2013	Jensen Ackles	Choice TV: Sci-Fi/Fantasy Actor	Nominated
2013	Jared Padalecki	Choice TV: Sci-Fi/Fantasy Actor	Nominated
2015	Jared Padalecki	Choice TV: Sci-Fi/Fantasy Actor	Won
2015	Jensen Ackles and Misha Collins	Choice TV: Chemistry	Won
2016	Supernatural	Choice TV: Sci-Fi/Fantasy Show	Nominated
2016	Jared Padalecki	Choice TV: Sci-Fi/Fantasy Actor	Nominated
2016	Misha Collins	Choice TV: Scene Stealer	Nominated
2016	Jensen Ackles and Misha Collins	Choice TV: Chemistry	Nominated
2017	Supernatural	Choice TV: Sci-Fi/Fantasy Show	Nominated
2017	Jensen Ackles	Choice TV: Sci-Fi/Fantasy Actor	Nominated
2017	Mark Pellegrino	Choice TV: Villain	Nominated
2018	Supernatural	Choice TV: Sci-Fi/Fantasy Show	Nominated
2019	Supernatural	Choice TV: Sci-Fi/Fantasy Show	Nominated
2019	Jared Padalecki	Choice Sci-Fi/Fantasy TV Actor	Won

== TV Guide Awards ==
The TV Guide Awards was an annual award created by the editors of TV Guide magazine, as a readers poll to honor outstanding programs and performers in the American television industry. Supernatural has received all four awards from their nominations. Furthermore, at the end of 2010, Supernatural won the cover of TV Guide Magazine, with fans casting over five million votes.

Year	Nominee / work	Award	Result
2011	Supernatural	Favorite Sci-Fi Series	Won
2011	Jensen Ackles	Favorite Actor	Won
2011	Misha Collins	Favorite Non-Human	Won
2012	Supernatural	Favorite Horror Series	Won

== Young Artist Awards ==
The Young Artist Awards is an accolade bestowed by the Young Artist Association to honor excellence of youth performers. Supernatural has received two awards from their eight nominations.

Year	Nominee / work	Award	Result
2007	Colby Paul	Best Performance in a TV Series (Comedy or Drama) – Guest Starring Young Actor	Nominated
2008	Nicholas Elia	Best Performance in a TV Series — Guest Starring Young Actor (for "The Kids Are Alright")	Nominated
2008	Conchita Campbell	Best Performance in a TV Series — Guest Starring Young Actress (for "Playthings")	Nominated
2009	Nicole Leduc	Best Performance in a TV Series – Guest Starring Young Actress (for "Wishful Thinking")	Won
2010	Colin Ford	Best Performance in a TV Series – Recurring Young Actor 13 and Under	Won
2010	Cainan Wiebe	Best Performance in a TV Series – Guest Starring Young Actor 13 and Under (for "After School Special")	Nominated
2010	Dalila Bela	Best Performance in a TV Series – Guest Starring Young Actress (for "I Believe the Children Are Our Future")	Nominated
2011	Adom Osei	Best Performance in a TV Series – Guest Starring Young Actor 11–13 (for "The Third Man")	Nominated

== Hugo Awards ==
The Hugo Award is an award given by the World Science Fiction Society for the best science fiction or fantasy works in the previous year. Supernatural received its first Hugo nomination on April 26, 2016. The awards were presented on August 21, 2016.

Year	Nominee / work	Award	Result
2016	Supernatural	Best Dramatic Presentation, Short Form (for "Just My Imagination")	Nominated
