= Never Ever Do This at Home =

- Genre: Documentary; Reality; Comedy
- Starring: Teddy Wilson; Norm Sousa
- Country of origin: Canada
- Original language: English
- No. of seasons: 2
- No. of episodes: 21

Production
- Production location: Southwestern Ontario
- Running time: 30 minutes
- Production company: Insight Productions

Original release
- Network: Discovery Channel Canada
- Release: May 6, 2013 – June 17, 2014

Never Ever Do This at Home is a comedy reality television show that aired on Discovery Channel Canada. Based on Ikke gjør dette hjemme, the show features hosts Teddy Wilson and Norm Sousa, who ignore the warning labels on a variety of household items, with varying results. The show made its debut on May 6, 2013 with two back-to-back episodes. The show was licensed by Spike TV to air in the United States. Reruns also air on MTV in Canada.

== The hosts ==
=== Teddy Wilson ===
Teddy Wilson is best known as the host of InnerSPACE, a science fiction news show airing on Space.

He began his career in the entertainment industry as a child actor in You Can't Do That on Television. He went on to earn an Honours B.A. in political science and worked as a political advisor in the Ontario legislature. He left politics to work at MTV in 2005, and in 2008 was recruited by Space to host InnerSPACE. His first assignment was interviewing George Lucas.

=== Norm Sousa ===
Norm Sousa is a comedian and actor from Toronto currently living in New York City.

He started his entertainment career at Humber College Comedy: Writing and Performance where, after graduation, he founded a comedy troupe called punchDRYSDALE which performed multiple times at the Toronto Sketch Comedy Festival. He later joined the comedy ensemble The Sketchersons, where he became the head writer and producer of Sunday Night Live.

== Production ==
On September 12, 2012, following the success of Ikke gjør dette hjemme in Norway, Discovery Channel Canada secured the rights to produce the first English-language version of the show from Norwegian broadcaster NRK through independent distributor DRG. Insight TV was commissioned to produce 13 30-minute episodes for the first season. Similar shows are planned for the Danish, German, and Swedish TV markets.

Filming began on an old farm house in southwestern Ontario where the hosts set up shop along with a crew of safety professionals, including firefighters. 20 cameras were installed in the farmhouse to capture every angle, including Phantom high-speed cameras that can capture 2,650 frames per second. The show focuses on the physics and chemistry behind the disasters caused by the hosts' experiments.

Season 2 was filmed in the Bradford, Ontario area.

== Critical response ==
Before the show's first episode aired, Bill Harris, of Canoe.ca, said the show appeals to "the defiant [...] kid [...] within all of us" and said the show works best when it focuses on potential disasters viewers might have wondered about, and said he didn't relate to experiments such as the walk-in microwave oven, since that's not what a normal person might think of.

== Episodes ==
=== Season 1 (2013) ===
14 episodes aired in the first season, including a retrospective and behind-the-scenes special at the end of the season. Here are the highlights of the episodes.

No. overall	No. in season	Title	Original release date
1	1	TBA	May 6, 2013
Using fireworks indoors. Building a walk-in microwave oven. Heating canned goods by placing the unopened cans directly on the stove. Tossing a propane-filled cooking canister into a fire -- indoors.
2	2	TBA	May 6, 2013
Testing the flammability of various food items -- nachos and coffee whitener. Playing baseball indoors. Microwaving emu eggs in their shell. Playing with electricity. The dangers of illegal moonshine. * This episode was banned in the US (though it still played in Canada and Europe) due to the segment about moonshine.
3	3	TBA	May 13, 2013
Using rockets to dry laundry. Cooking with space heaters. Playing golf indoors. Deep frying frozen food. Appliance Death Match: Toaster vs. Popcorn maker.
4	4	TBA	May 13, 2013
Microwaving a bottle of champagne. Wagering on whether indoor or outdoor vermin is craftier. Using a lawn mower to shave a shag carpet. Cooking with a washer and dryer. Adding a sunroof to a car using thermite.
5	5	TBA	May 20, 2013
Barbecueing indoors. Review outcome of vermin challenge from the last episode. Indoors crossbow shooting. Using a water heater to brew coffee. Propane-filled balloons. Appliance Death Match: Coffee maker vs. Deep fryer.
6	6	TBA	May 20, 2013
Lighting a fuse without a match. Lighting candles from across the room. Adding heavy objects to a washing machine's spin cycle. Motocrossing indoors. Studying oxygen fires.
7	7	TBA	May 27, 2013
Driving with open fuel containers. Cooking using the dishwasher. Waterproof grilling wieners using magnesium. Jumping on the bed. Overfilling a water-bed.
8	8	TBA	May 27, 2013
Norm drives a full-sized remote control car. Appliance Death Match: Waffle maker vs. Rice cooker.
9	9	TBA	June 3, 2013
Overinflating tires. Attempting to add a new door, using explosives. Beer in the hot water tank Flooding the bathroom.
10	10	TBA	June 3, 2013
Using explosives to dig holes for planting the garden. Moving the piano downstairs using explosives Building an alarm system using dry ice. Bowling using the hallway as the alley and bowling using flammable pins. Appliance Death Match: Finals: Deep fryer vs. Waffle maker vs. Toaster
11	11	TBA	June 10, 2013
Adding water to hot oil.
12	12	TBA	June 10, 2013
Using explosives to dig a hot tub Playing with piñatas. Building the largest night-light using glow-sticks. Turning over an unregulated propane tank. Pushing off the front of the house.
13	13	TBA	June 17, 2013
Skeet shooting and shooting at hydrogen balloons. Painting with explosives. Bringing down the house, via propane and a spark.
14	14	TBA	June 17, 2013
After the Mayhem: The hosts explain many of the behind-the-scenes elements of the show, including preparing the house for the show, introducing the various experts and safety personnel that worked on the show. Showing some of the scariest moments, some of the biggest failures and some experiments that did not make the regular show.

=== Season 2 (2014) ===
Season 2 of Never Ever Do This At Home aired on May 12, 2014.

No. overall	No. in season	Title	Original release date
15	1	TBA	May 12, 2014
A bathtub is moved up stairs in the Season 2 premiere. Also: a mobile hot tub.
16	2	TBA	May 12, 2014
Dangers of woodworking; how to cut the grass faster; building a couch boat.
17	3	TBA	May 19, 2014
Rafting down a man-made river; defrosting a freezer; building a remote-control boat.
18	4	TBA	May 19, 2014
A homemade tennis-ball dispenser. Shooting gas canisters. Making a giant creme brûlé in a hot tub.
19	5	TBA	May 26, 2014
Hosts Teddy Wilson and Norm Sousa make a BBQ with a lawn sprinkler and try to paint a room using a lawnmower. They also use science and food to make their own rocket fuel and head down to the hunting cabin to learn the wrong way to fuel up their boat.
20	6	TBA	May 26, 2014
In this episode, hosts Teddy Wilson and Norm Sousa find an innovative way to change their truck tires without a jack and reinvent the game of darts.They find a new way to smoke fish and find the wrong ways to open a safe.
21	7	TBA	June 3, 2014
Dangers of methane gas are examined.
22	8	TBA	June 3, 2014
An indoor ice rink is built; dangers of paint fumes are examined.
23	9	TBA	June 10, 2014
The practicality of vacuum sealing is examined; dangers of spontaneous combustion are explored.
24	10	TBA	June 10, 2014
A new way to detail a truck; a method for quickly putting up holiday lights.
25	11	TBA	June 17, 2014
Testing an alternate method for packing and lifting boxes of heavy books and furniture.
26	12	TBA	June 17, 2014
A rooftop patio is built.

== See also ==
- Ikke gjør dette hjemme
- House Hazards - A similar Canadian show
