= Entertainment Tonight Canada =

Canadian TV series (2005–2023)

- Also known as: ET Canada
- Based on: Entertainment Tonight by Al Masini
- Directed by: Ryan Carter; Adrian O'Connor; Frank Sampson
- Presented by: Cheryl Hickey; Sangita Patel; Carlos Bustamante; Keshia Chanté
- Country of origin: Canada
- Original language: English
- No. of seasons: 19
- No. of episodes: 4,660 (4,617 weekdays; 43 weekend)

Production
- Executive producers: John Kampilis; Laura Carroll
- Production locations: Global Television; Toronto, Ontario
- Running time: 30 minutes
- Production companies: Corus Entertainment in association with: CBS Media Ventures

Original release
- Network: Global
- Release: September 12, 2005 – October 6, 2023

Entertainment Tonight Canada (commonly shortened to ET Canada) is a Canadian entertainment news television series that aired on the Global Television Network from 2005 to 2023. Its branding and format were based on the American entertainment newsmagazine Entertainment Tonight, and ET Canada was usually aired back-to-back with the American version on most Global stations.

ET Canada was hosted by longtime Global Toronto entertainment host Cheryl Hickey and Sangita Patel, while presented alongside reporters Carlos Bustamante and Keshia Chanté.

The program's original founding producer was Zev Shalev.

ETC Live was an online show in connection with ET Canada; it aired weekdays via Facebook and YouTube, and was shot live with expanded coverage of entertainment news. It was an interactive show, allowing viewers to submit commentary as Weston, Chanté and Graeme O'Neil debate topics.

Global launched a weekend edition of ET Canada hosted by Sangita Patel; that aired starting on September 18, 2021. The weekend edition of the series was not renewed for a second season.

On September 27, 2023, Global announced the cancellation of the series, with the final episode airing October 6.

== On-air staff ==
=== Most recent on-air staff ===
- Cheryl Hickey (2005–2023)
- Sangita Patel (2013–2023)
- Carlos Bustamante (2017–2023)
- Keshia Chanté (2018–2023)
- Dallas Dixon (2019–2023)
- Morgan Hoffman (2019–2023)
- Brittnee Blair (2022–2023)
- Jed Tavernier (2022–2023)

=== Previous on-air staff ===
- Rick Campanelli (2005–2017)
- Roz Weston (2005–2022)
- Graeme O'Neil (2005–2021)

== Reception ==
The show was nominated for a Gemini Award in the best general interest series category in 2006.

== Spin-offs ==
The show has also added three spin-off shows and an annual special. ET Canada: Behind the Scenes gives viewers a peek behind the curtain, showcasing the team behind the brand. There have been two installments to date, the first highlighting the Toronto International Film Festival, debuted in October 2011. The second brought fans to the Grammy Awards, and documented the last minute-changes to the live red carpet show, in the wake of Whitney Houston's shocking sudden death.

ET Canada: Conversations highlights major international stars in extended long form interviews. The premiere episode featured Michael Bublé and aired in December 2011. Since then, One Direction, Coldplay, Katy Perry, Nickelback, Kylie Minogue, and Carrie Underwood have all been subjects.

From 2008 through 2015, Global produced coverage of New Year's Eve festivities from Queen Victoria Park and the Skylon Tower in Niagara Falls, Ontario, co-branded as the ET Canada New Year's Eve Bash. The special—which had originally been produced as a local telecast for CHCH—was discontinued in 2015.

In June 2016, the show began infrequent additional live episodes on Facebook. On September 12, 2016, ET Canada Live began its daily broadcast online and on Global. Similar to Access Hollywood Live and TMZ Live, the show is shot during the afternoon in-studio and features viewer interaction.

In 2017, ET Canada launched ETC Live an online show that airs live weekdays on Facebook and YouTube with an expanded coverage of entertainment news. Often hosted by Roz Weston, Graeme O'Neil and Keshia Chanté.

Dallas Dixon was ET Canada’s Pride Correspondent on-air, while also hosting & producing ET Canada Pride, a digital series on LGBTQ-oriented entertainment news, while Morgan Hoffman hosted Royal Rewind, a digital series reporting news involving the British royal family. Both ET Canada Pride and Royal Rewind received Canadian Screen Award nominations for Best Web Program or Series, Nonfiction at the 10th Canadian Screen Awards in 2022 and at the 11th Canadian Screen Awards in 2023, with ET Canada Pride winning the award in 2023.

In 2021, the series also produced Artists & Icons: Indigenous Entertainers in Canada, a special episode devoted to highlighting the achievements of indigenous actors and musicians working in Canadian entertainment, to mark the National Day of Truth and Reconciliation. The special, featuring actress and podcaster Shayla Stonechild as a guest co-host, also received two CSA nominations in 2021, for Best Talk Program or Series and Best Direction, Lifestyle or Information (Ryan Carter).
