= List of Ikke gjør dette hjemme episodes =

The following article is a list of episodes of the Norwegian television show Ikke gjør dette hjemme.

== Series overview ==
| Season | Episodes | Originally released | |
| Season | Episodes | First released | Last released |
|---|---|---|---|
| 1 | 4 | January 6, 2011 | January 27, 2011 |
| 2 | 6 | January 5, 2012 | February 9, 2012 |
| 3 | 7 | October 15, 2013 | November 26, 2013 |

== Episodes ==
=== Season 1 (2011) ===
The first season also featured the Appliances deathmatch, where the hosts try to find the ultimate kitchen appliance for all tasks. This segment was dropped for season 2.

| No. overall | No. in series | Title | Original release date |
|---|---|---|---|
| 1 | 1 | TBA | January 6, 2011 |
Using fireworks indoors. Building a walk-in microwave oven. Washing wool sweater on 90 °C. Carbonating milk in a soda machine. Appliance deathmatch: Coffee maker vs deep fryer vs egg cooker. Making tomato soup in the dish washer. Blowing up a butane canister inside a small room.
| 2 | 2 | TBA | January 13, 2011 |
Hermetic cans on stoves. Steel wool in micro wave. Using Zalo in the dish washer. Carbonating coffee in a soda machine. Making a immersion blender helicopter. Cooking lamb on solar oven. Appliance deathmatch: Toaster vs tea cooker vs popcorn maker. The dangers of moonshine. What happens if you stop the cooling?
| 3 | 3 | TBA | January 20, 2011 |
Spray can on a grill indoors. Fireworks in a bean bag chair. Coffee out of a hot water tap through a hot water tank. Bomb of baking soda and Plumbo. Don't eat snow. Fireworks in a bean bag chair. Appliance deathmatch: Waffle maker vs rice cooker vs raclette maker. Fireworks in a bean bag chair. Carboating cod liver oil in a soda machine. Filling a room with water.
| 4 | 4 | TBA | January 27, 2011 |
Microwaving eggs. Jumping in a bed. Carbonating red wine in a soda machine. Connecting 20 cables at same time in an extension cord. Smoke bomb of herbicide and sugar. Appliance deathmatch final: Popcorn maker vs deep fryer vs raclette maker. Spray can with paint on a grill. Children destroying the house. Jumping on a tube with "makrell i tomat". Running into the house with a hat. Putting out a grease-fire with water.

=== Season 2 (2012) ===
| No. overall | No. in series | Title | Original release date |
|---|---|---|---|
| 5 | 1 | TBA | January 5, 2012 |
Cockroaches and rats Throwing marbles, a hammer, a bowling ball and a stone inside a washing machine during its spin cycle. Swimming pool filled with jelly Potato gun Launching a Christmas tree with a rocket Opening an umbrella indoors Indoor sports series: Golfing Chopping wood with explosives
| 6 | 2 | TBA | January 12, 2012 |
Camping with a campfire and fishing in a living room Indoor sports series: Duck hunting in a living room - shooting a duck displayed on television sets Making an igloo of vanilla ice cream Launching a rocket with a mannequin attached Running with scissors Painting with dynamite Felling a tree against the house
| 7 | 3 | TBA | January 19, 2012 |
Making a fireplace with dynamite, and firing up a tire. Sweeping the chimney using a fire hose. Indoor sports series: Motocrossing. Launching a rocket with a television set attached Game fish: Sveinung vs. Bjørnar. Rocking and tilting a chair. Moving the piano downstairs using explosives.
| 8 | 4 | TBA | January 26, 2012 |
Using magnesium for grilling. Making a garage for your car. Converting a car to a convertible using theremite. Launching a rocket with a torchiere lamp attached. Fun with hydrogen gas. Brewing beer in the storage water heater. Blowing up a storage water heater indoors.
| 9 | 5 | TBA | February 2, 2012 |
Whipping cream with an outboard engine. Throwing electric appliances in a bath tub. Checking up on the beer brewed in the storage water heater. Launching a rocket with a briefcase attached. Indoor sports series: athletics - javelin, discus and hammer throwing. Escalating play. What happens if you tear down the side wall of a house? Is it a supporting wall?
| 10 | 6 | TBA | February 9, 2012 |
Up in a ballon Checking in on the rats and cockroaches Outside and inside voice Launching a rocket with items from a typical norwegian friday night attached. Indoor sports series: biathlon. Smoking and using snus (moist snuff) in bed. Flammable holidays.

=== Season 3 (2013) ===
| No. overall | No. in series | Title | Original release date |
|---|---|---|---|
| 11 | 1 | TBA | October 15, 2013 |
Pressure washer as a flamethrower Super slow: cutting open a water ballon with a gold fish inside Using a cannon filled with dynamite and paint to paint a house Breeding blow flies inside a caravan Super slow: cat attacking a water ballon with a gold fish inside How to make black powder? Don't go out with wet hair Making a skylight by exploding an anvil through the roof.
| 12 | 2 | TBA | October 22, 2013 |
Horizontal bathtub Super slow: burning bubbles Horse inside the house Super slow: crushing marbles Sanding floors with a Harley Davidson; Clothes soaked in liquour dried in a condenser dryer Super slow: crushing of wine glasses Set fire to gasoline with explosives
| 13 | 3 | TBA | October 29, 2013 |
Don't throw food Super slow: jumping on a bed Bullet on the stove Checking up on the blowflies Vacuuming gunpowder Is it dangerous with draught in a house? Super slow: light bulbs Overfilling a water bed.
| 14 | 4 | TBA | November 5, 2013 |
Opening a champagne bottle with a saber, a wrench, a chain saw, a shotgun, a golf club, and using explosives. Super slow: eggs in a mousetrap Using branch cutters as a kitchen appliance Diet coke and salt whirlpool in a bath tub The worst smell in the world Super slow: melon shot with a shotgun Roar and Morten's burglar alarm Super slow: coffee cup crushed Throwing a stone of 1.2 tonne
| 15 | 5 | TBA | November 12, 2013 |
Use a chimney as a cannon. Using explosives to remove a football stuck in the top of a chimney Super slow: leaf blower in the face Cutting of the top of a scuba tank Exploding birthday balloons - balloons filled with hydrogen gas instead of helium Using an ax to split an MacBook Pro; Shooting at a propane tank Propane gas explosion in a candle-lit room
| 16 | 6 | TBA | November 19, 2013 |
Super slow classic: washing machine A romantic evening with lighter fluid Laundry ala Roar; Thousands of blow flies - checking in on the blow flies from episode 2. The great test of common superstitions Rock 'n' roll washing machine Using a vacuum cleaner to vacuum pack a caravan
| 17 | 7 | TBA | November 26, 2013 |
Overfilling a semi-trailer tire Roar, we salute you Fried turkey Super slow: pineapple VS shotgun Heating canned goods by placing the unopened cans directly on the stove Super slow: light bulb in vise Using lighter fluid in a sprinkler system
