= Ajay Fry =

Canadian comedian and television personality (born 1983)

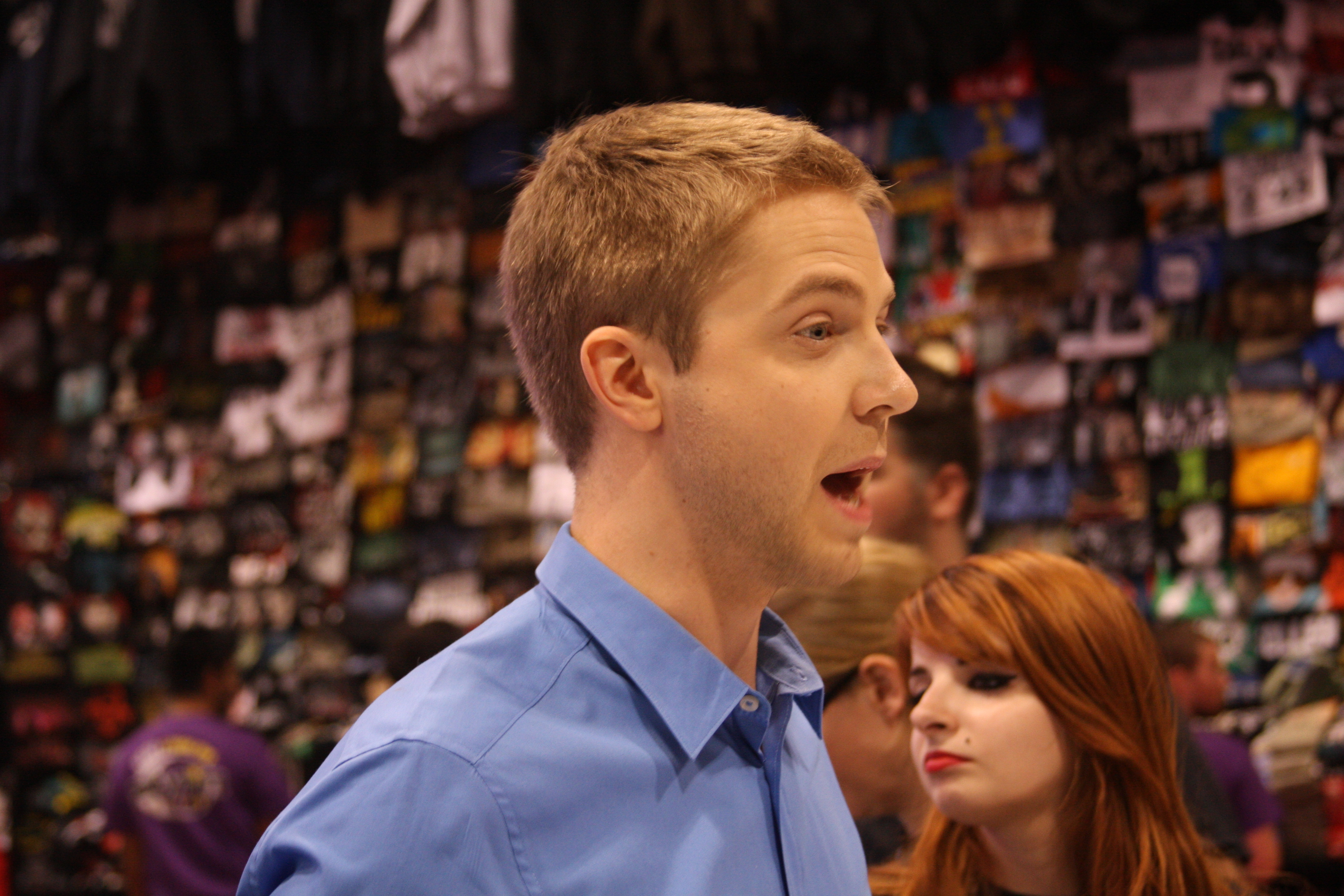
- Ajay Fry
- Born: Ajay Jack Fry; 17 June 1983 (age 43); Toronto, Ontario, Canada
- Occupations: Television host and personality
- Years active: 1990–present
- Known for: The Little Lulu Show (1995–1996)

Ajay Fry (born Ajay Jack Fry, 17 June 1983) is a Canadian comedian, television personality and producer who grew up in Ottawa, Ontario, best known as host on the official Orphan Black after show After the Black on BBC America, and the Canadian daily entertainment talk show InnerSpace on Space (2008–2018).

== Early life ==
Fry was born in Toronto, Ontario, on June 17, 1983, to Pat Fry, a voiceover artist (best known for his role as the titular character's father on the Canadian children's TV series Caillou) and former radio host, and Sharon Fry (née Hoff), a legal assistant. Fry grew up in Ottawa, Ontario, where he regularly performed at The Institution while attending Colonel By Secondary School.

== Career ==
=== Early career ===
At age 7, Fry took his first job as a host on a local community travel series in Ottawa called Rainbow Merry-Go-Round. He went on to make appearances on Are You Afraid of the Dark? and Big Wolf on Campus, and has voiced characters on animated series such as The Little Lulu Show and Arthur, among others. At the age of 20, Fry moved to Toronto to attend Humber College's Comedy: Writing and Performance program, where he was nominated for the Phil Hartman Award. After graduating he attended Second City Conservatory training and launched his first web series, The Not Yet Show.

=== Crunch ===
From September 2006 until August 2008, Fry hosted Crunch, the Saturday morning programming block on YTV. During this time he also appeared on-screen at the Rogers Centre to promote Jr. Jays weekend activities.

=== InnerSpace ===
In the summer of 2008, after two years on YTV, Fry was hired as the new host of The Circuit, a weekly entertainment news program on Space Channel. In 2009, the show was re-branded to InnerSpace a nightly "after show" style program following Space's prime time programming. After 2 seasons, InnerSpace changed formats once again, becoming an entertainment news talk show with co-hosts Teddy Wilson and Morgan Hoffman.

During his tenure at InnerSpace, Fry has interviewed a wide array of celebrities and artists, including actors Jeff Bridges, Hugh Jackman, Jennifer Lawrence, Jake Gyllenhaal, Mark Wahlberg, Sigourney Weaver, Jessica Alba, Kate Beckinsale, Jessica Chastain, Bryan Cranston, Mark Ruffalo, Martin Sheen, Will Ferrell, Dave Bautista, Nathan Fillion, William Shatner and Leonard Nimoy; Directors Joss Whedon, Zack Snyder, Guillermo del Toro; authors, Neil Gaiman, Robert Munsh, Robert J. Sawyer, Stan Lee; the casts of The Twilight Saga, The Big Bang Theory, Game of Thrones, Doctor Who, The Walking Dead, Orphan Black, Star Trek: The Next Generation, and many others.

Fry has conducted set visits, interviews and covered video game industry events, across North America, Europe, and the United Kingdom, including a set visit for the Harry Potter film franchise, visits to Skywalker Ranch, and has covered The Toronto International Film Festival, E3, San Diego Comic-Con, Fan Expo Canada, Calgary Expo, and numerous other national and international events.

Fry's hosting duties also extend to a number of after shows and specials for some of Space Channel's more prominent series, including the Day of the Doctor, After Bite (following Bitten), and After the Black (following Orphan Black).

In 2011, Fry won 'Outstanding Contribution to Film or TV' at the Canadian Science Fiction Awards for his work on InnerSpace along with co-host, Teddy Wilson.

=== After the Black ===
On Saturday, March 26, 2016 it was announced that After the Black, the Orphan Black after show hosted by Fry and his co-hosts Teddy Wilson and Morgan Hoffman had been picked up by BBC America and would be broadcast following Orphan Black during the show's fourth season.

=== YouTube ===
In 2015, Fry became a Much creator and launched a YouTube series called 5 on Fry (a weekly look at five different topics), as well as a personal vlog.

== Other work ==
Fry has made a number of appearances in other media, including appearing as himself in the commercial for a 2014 Nintendo Canada contest celebrating the launch of Donkey Kong: Tropical Freeze, and appearing in a supporting role as a fictionalized version of himself in the 2015 film Pure Pwnage: The Movie. He has also appeared in the Captain Canuck web series as himself.

Fry has hosted numerous media and industry events, including etalk Live On The Red Carpet At The Toronto International Film Festival (co-hosted with Jessi Cruickshank), the Joe Shuster Awards (Canada's Comic Book Awards), the Canadian Science Fiction Awards, and the Toronto Independent Music Awards.

Fry has contributed written work to Metro News and has appeared in The Toronto Star. He makes regular appearances on Canada AM, etalk, CTV News, The Marilyn Denis Show, CP24, and CHUM Radio, and has appeared on George Stroumboulopoulos Tonight.
