= House Hazards =

- Genre: Reality
- Starring: Dan Dicaire; Francesca Garigue; Brendan Callaghan
- Original language: English
- No. of seasons: 1 (ongoing)
- No. of episodes: 14

Production
- Running time: 30 minutes
- Production company: Cineflix Inc.

Original release
- Network: HGTV Canada
- Release: October 16, 2012 – present

House Hazards is a television series produced by Cineflix that premiered on HGTV Canada on October 16, 2012. The show is co-hosted by Francesca Garigue, Dan Dicaire and Brendan Callaghan. Each episode of House Hazards looks at an everyday household danger. The hosts use state of the art technology and scientific experiments to explore the sometimes disastrous results of human error or general wear on a house.

== Hosts ==
Brendan Callaghan: Toronto-based special-effects guru Brendan Callaghan is one of the co-hosts of House Hazards. As a former bartender, Brendan transitioned into a TV art department gig in 1996, but stepped in front of the camera for the first time as the co-host of Prank Science. He has also worked as a special-effects technician for This Is Howie Do It, before becoming a co-host on House Hazards.

Francesca Garigue: Francesca Garigue is an animal biologist and a former runway model. With degrees in biology and psychology from Carleton University in Ottawa, Francesca served as the Program Manager of the Science Alberta Foundation, helping to promote science and technology in schools and on social media. She also conducted fieldwork in Namibia at a wildcat rehabilitation centre.

Dan Dicaire: While pursuing chemical engineering degrees from the University of Ottawa, Dan Dicaire's research on solar heat was presented at conferences around the world. Dan is currently an Energy Efficiency and Sustainability Officer at Ottawa Community Housing Corporation. He was also a contestant in the first season of Canada'a Greatest Know-It-All.

== See also ==
- Never Ever Do This At Home, a television series with the same theme aired on Discovery.
- de:Nicht nachmachen!, a television series with the same theme aired on Discovery (Germany)
- Achtung! - Die Exprimenten-Show, a television series with the same theme aired on Discovery (Switzerland)
