= Ikke gjør dette hjemme =

Norwegian television show

- Genre: Documentary, Reality, Comedy
- Starring: Rune Nilson (season 1-4); Per Olav Alvestad (season 1-3); Torfinn Borkhus (season 4-6); Marte Hedenstad (season 5-6)
- Country of origin: Norway
- Original language: Norwegian
- No. of seasons: 6
- No. of episodes: 43 (list of episodes)

Production
- Production locations: Multiple locations, primarily in Trøndelag, Norway
- Running time: 30 minutes

Original release
- Network: NRK
- Release: 6 January 2011 – 22 November 2017

Related
- Never Ever Do This At Home

Ikke gjør dette hjemme (literal: Don't do this at home) was a Norwegian comedy-reality TV that aired on NRK1 from 2011 until 2017. Since its debut in 2011, six series have been aired. A Canadian remake was made for Discovery Channel (Canada) in 2013.

== Concept ==
The show is a comic documentary-style reality series in which hosts Rune Nilson and Per Olav Alvestad defy warnings and restrictions on various items to see what happens when they do. Some of their experiments include lighting fireworks inside, washing wool on high temperatures, putting a bowling ball inside a washing machine, and turning a small bathroom into a giant microwave oven using aluminium foil.

Each series takes place inside a condemned house scheduled for destruction, in which the two hosts move in and perform their experiments. The various concepts are often exaggerated for comic effect, regularly with severe damage to the house in the process. The final episode of each series always ends with the house being completely destroyed, usually in a fire.

In addition to the two hosts the series has several recurring members, most notably "Roar", their resident explosions expert, and "Sveinung", their goldfish.

== Production ==
The first series was filmed during summer 2010 and aired the following year. After being met with high ratings and positive reviews the show was renewed for a second series, which was produced and aired in 2012. Following speculation that the series had been cancelled, reportedly due to Rune Nilsson's wish to return to radio, a third series was made in 2013. In August 2014, the show's official Facebook page announced that a fourth series would be made soon, with a tentative airdate of autumn 2015.

== Episodes ==
Season	Episodes	Originally released	
Season	Episodes	First released	Last released
1	4	January 6, 2011	January 27, 2011
2	6	January 5, 2012	February 9, 2012
3	7	October 15, 2013	November 26, 2013

== Ratings and honours ==
The shows first series of four episodes achieved an impressive average viewer rating of 672,000 and a 43.4% market share, with a strong appeal for both male and female viewers. This placed the series well above the slot average of 546,000 and 37.8%. For both series 2 and 3 the show was consistently number one in its slot for all episodes.

The first series was nominated for best reality or magazine show at the Gullruten Television Awards in 2011. Later that year, the concept was named "Best New Concept" at a Berlin television festival. Several of the foreign versions have also seen nominations.

== International versions ==
The programme has since the premiere been remade in several foreign markets.

- Discovery Canada created the first English language version of the format in Canada in May 2013, Never Ever Do This At Home. Hosts are comedian Norm Sousa and Teddy Wilson, host of a popular Canadian entertainment talk show.
- In Denmark the show has been adapted by TV2 Zulu, with the title Dumt og Farligt (English: Stupid and Dangerous) since March 2012.
- In July and August 2012 Prime Productions produced the show for German broadcaster ZDF who ran the show under the name "Nicht nachmachen!". Two series have been made.
- A Swedish version, titled Never Ever (Try This At Home), was produced by OTW for Viasat and began airing in April 2013. The show featured the format's first female host, Lena Sahlberg, who performs experiments and stunts with co-host Mark Boham. The original Norwegian series has also been shown with subtitles in Sweden on SVT.
- In Poland and Holland the series was produced concurrently by Viacom, where it aired in 2013.
