= Nicht nachmachen! =

- Genre: Comedy, Documentary
- Presented by: Wigald Boning, Bernhard Hoëcker
- Opening theme: Live And Let Die
- Country of origin: Germany
- Original language: German
- No. of seasons: 3
- No. of episodes: 16

Production
- Producer: Prime Productions GmbH
- Production locations: Troisdorf (Season 1); Rahden (Season 2)
- Running time: 30 min

Original release
- Network: ZDF; ZDFneo
- Release: 29 June 2012 – 31 December 2025

Nicht nachmachen! (English: Don't Imitate! or Don't try this at home!) was a German comedy-documentary TV series that aired on ZDF and ZDFneo. The two hosts, Wigald Boning and Bernhard Hoëcker, defy the warnings and restrictions on various items to see what happens when they do. They conduct some experiments like lighting the fireworks within the living room. and trying to overfill a water bed to the point of bursting.

The series is an adaptation of the Norwegian show Ikke gjør dette hjemme.

== Episodes ==
=== Season 1 ===
- Episode 1 - June 29, 2012
- Episode 2 - July 6, 2012
- Episode 3 - July 13, 2012
- Episode 4 - July 20, 2012
- Episode 5 - July 27, 2012
- Episode 6 - August 3, 2012

=== Season 2 ===
- Episode 1 - July 26, 2013
- Episode 2 - August 2, 2013
- Episode 3 - August 9, 2013
- Episode 4 - August 16, 2013
- Episode 5 - August 23, 2013
- Episode 6 - August 30, 2013

=== Season 3 ===
- Episode 1 - December 30, 2025
- Episode 2 - December 30, 2025
- Episode 3 - December 30, 2025
- Episode 4 - December 30, 2025
