= Teddy Wilson (television personality) =

Canadian television host

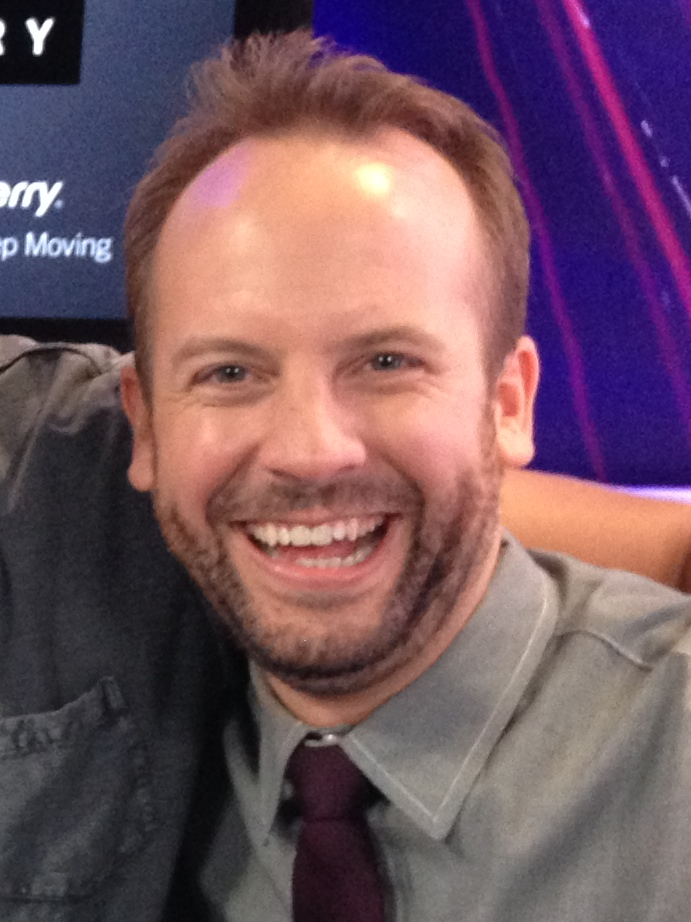
- Wilson in 2013
- Born: Edward Pierce Wilson; Ottawa, Ontario, Canada
- Education: B.A. (Hons.)
- Alma mater: Carleton University
- Occupations: Television host and personality, actor
- Years active: 1988–present

Edward Pierce Wilson is a Canadian television personality, actor and producer originally from Ottawa, Ontario, best known as host of the interactive real estate show Hot Property on CP24, and the documentary series Mighty Trains on Smithsonian Channel, Discovery Canada, and over 100 other international broadcasters; host of the factual entertainment series Never Ever Do This at Home (2013–2014) on Discovery Channel in Canada and Spike in the United States, and host/producer on the Canadian daily entertainment talk-show InnerSPACE on Space (2008–2018). He was also an actor on the internationally syndicated series You Can't Do That On Television, and a senior producer on the Gemini Award-winning series MTV Live.

== Career ==
=== You Can't Do That On Television ===
While a student in Ottawa, Wilson (then known as "Ted") appeared on the internationally syndicated series You Can't Do That On Television, broadcast in over 20 countries, including the United States on Nickelodeon and in Canada on YTV. He appeared in 16 episodes between 1989 and 1991.

=== Comedy Network and MTV Live ===
In 2004 and 2005, Wilson served as Talent Booker on The Comedy Network series PopCultured, hosted by comedian Elvira Kurt.

In 2005, Wilson joined MTV Canada for the launch of daily comedy talk show MTV Live, where he served as a senior producer until late 2008, and shared a Gemini Award for Best Talk Series. While working at MTV, Wilson often appeared on-air spoofing his "former child-star" status during the popular "after-school special" sketches.

=== InnerSpace ===
In late 2008, Wilson became a segment producer and on-air correspondent for Canada's national science-fiction and Genre channel, Space. Upon the creation of flagship daily entertainment talk-show InnerSPACE in 2009, he became co-host of the new series, alongside Ajay Fry and Morgan Hoffman.

After a first assignment interviewing George Lucas at Skywalker Ranch, Wilson went on to interview Sir Anthony Hopkins, Hugh Jackman, Jennifer Lawrence, Jake Gyllenhaal, Matt Damon, Jodie Foster, Christian Bale, Kate Beckinsale, Nicolas Cage, Bryan Cranston, Mark Ruffalo, Martin Sheen, Anderson Cooper, John Malkovich, Nathan Fillion, William Shatner and Leonard Nimoy; Directors David Cronenberg, Robert Zemeckis, Zack Snyder, Guillermo del Toro; authors George R.R. Martin, Neil Gaiman, Anne Rice; Marvel's Stan Lee; the casts of The Twilight Saga, The Big Bang Theory, Game of Thrones, Doctor Who, The Walking Dead, Star Trek: The Next Generation, and many others.

As host of InnerSpace, Wilson conducted set visits and interviews across North America, the United Kingdom, Thailand, Russia, and covered The Toronto International Film Festival, San Diego Comic-Con, Fan Expo Canada, and numerous other national and international events.

In 2011, Wilson won "Outstanding Contribution to Film or TV" at the Canadian Sci-Fi Awards for his work on InnerSpace.

Wilson was nominated for Best Host in a Variety, Lifestyle, Reality/Competition, Talk Program or Series at the 2015 Canadian Screen Awards for his work on Innerspace.

InnerSpace was nominated for Best Talk Program or Series at the 2017 Canadian Screen Awards.

=== Never Ever Do This at Home ===
Alongside award-winning comedian Norm Sousa (The Sketchersons), Wilson hosts the factual entertainment series Never Ever Do This at Home. Production on season 1 occurred in Fall/Winter 2012, and aired on the Discovery Channel in Canada, Spike in the United States, and NRK3 in Norway.

Never Ever Do This at Home's first season was nominated for Best Factual Series by the Canadian Screen Awards, and the second season of the show aired on Discovery Canada in Spring 2014. The format for the 13-episode series, produced by Toronto-based Insight Production Company Ltd in association with Discovery Canada and Bell Media, is based on an original series devised by Norwegian broadcaster NRK and distributed by DRG.

The Hollywood Reporter at one time suggested that U.K. distributor DRG was close to also selling Insight's Never Ever Do This at Home version to broadcasters in the U.K., China, Spain, and Italy.

=== After the Black ===
On Saturday, March 26, 2016 it was announced that After the Black, the Orphan Black after show hosted by Wilson and his co-hosts Ajay Fry and Morgan Hoffman, had been picked up by BBC America for broadcast following Orphan Black during the show's fourth season.

=== Mighty Trains ===
Wilson is currently host of Mighty Trains. The series airs in over 100 countries, including in the United States on Smithsonian Channel and Discovery Channel in Canada.

Each one-hour episode takes place on a train trip in a scenic global location. Since premiering in 2016 the series has spanned 6 continents, covering trains in Switzerland, Japan, Norway, Australia, Ecuador, India, Spain, New Zealand, Sweden, Thailand, South Africa, Italy, Peru, Vietnam, Serbia & Montenegro, Canada, and the United States.

Mighty Trains won the Gold Medal in the "Travel and Tourism" category at the 2018 New York Festival's World's Best TV & Film Awards.

The series was renewed for a fourth season, with production occurring in late 2019 and early 2020.

In 2022, he was cohost with Aliya Jasmine of the spinoff series The Mightiest.

== Other work ==
Wilson is guest co-host of Cravings: The Aftershow season 1 on streaming service Crave, alongside host Elaine Lui from The Social and eTalk. They describe plot points and analyze characters from the HBO series The Outsider.

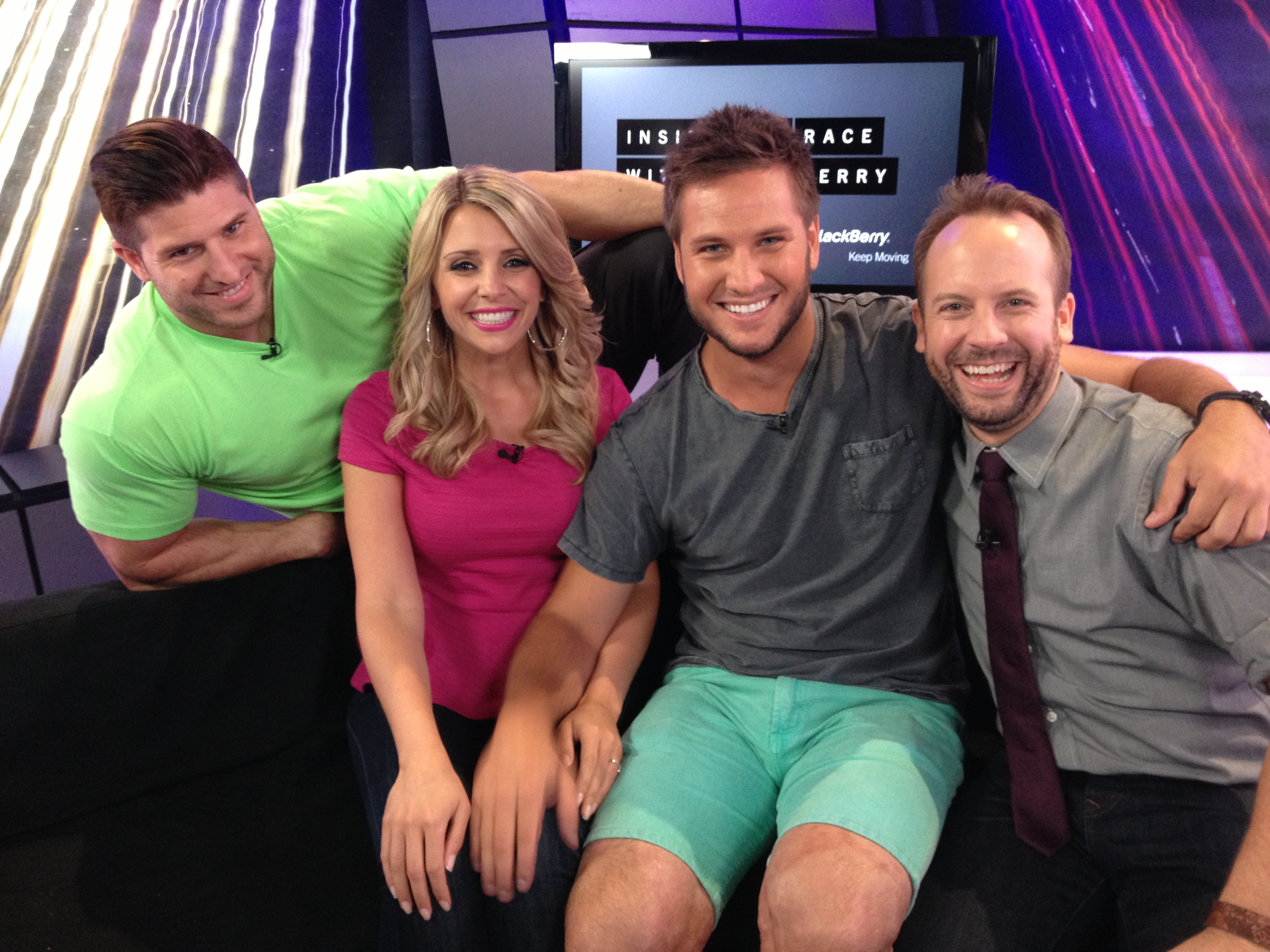
Teddy Wilson on the ‘Inside The Race’ set with Amazing Race Canada team Jet & Dave

Wilson hosted Inside the Race, the digital companion series for The Amazing Race Canada during the show's first season. Co-hosted by etalk's Danielle McGimsie, the webisodes feature analysis and after-show interviews with race teams and series host Jon Montgomery.

In November 2013, Wilson appeared as a celebrity panelist on five episodes of the Comedy Network series Match Game. He is a regular guest on etalk, CTV News, The Marilyn Denis Show, CP24, and The Social.

Wilson's writing has appeared in the Toronto Star (Canada's largest newspaper), Toro Magazine, and Metro News.

Wilson has hosted numerous media and industry events, including the Canadian Screen Awards' FanZone, etalk Live on the Red Carpet at The Toronto International Film Festival (co-hosted with Ben Mulroney), the Joe Shuster Awards (Canada's Comic Book Awards), and the Canadian Science Fiction Awards.

Wilson plays drums in the indie-rock band HUDDLE, represented by Third Side Music. HUDDLE's videos have been played on MuchMusic and MTV Canada, and their music can be heard in the MTV series Teen Mom and Robert Redford's film The Company You Keep.

While earning an honours B.A. in political science, Wilson worked as a constituency assistant to John Baird, the former Member of Parliament and Canadian Minister of Foreign Affairs, and after university went on to work for Baird at the Ontario Legislature. Wilson continued to work in the Ontario government as a political advisor to David Turnbull, Member of Provincial Parliament of Don Valley West and Minister of Enterprise, Opportunity and Innovation, until 2003.
