= Drakaina (model) =

French actress and model

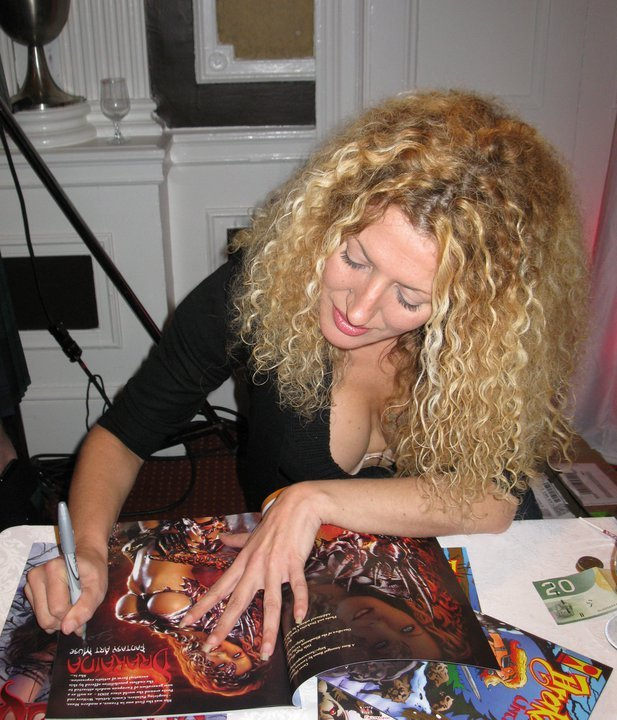
- Drakaina signing books Hal-Con 2010
- Born: August 28, 1975 (age 51); Vincennes, France
- Spouse: Ariock - Separated in 2010

Drakaina (born August 28, 1975) is a French actress and model. The name, Drakaina, means "she dragon" in Greek. When Drakaina and artist Ariock were talking about Echidna, the mother of all monsters, he mentioned that she was a "Drakaina", and she instantly knew that it would be her name. Drakaina is a registered trademark belonging to Drakaina since 2001.

== Biography ==
=== Early life ===
Drakaina was born in Vincennes, France. Her father, Gilles, is a retired restaurant owner and her mother, Catherine, is a breeder of Pyrenean Mountain Dogs. Drakaina began her acting career after being spotted in a club. Beforehand, she had been working as a receptionist and been a model for an international hair product company CAPIRELAX. She is best known for her career as a fantasy art model, working with over 340 international painters and comic book artists.

=== Career ===
Since 2001, Drakaina has appeared in a number of French magazines which include Playboy, Verites, Khimairia, and New Look, as well as television/radio productions on TF1, Europe1, and France3. She became Ariock's spokesmodel and has been recognized as France's first ever fantasy art model. She had a supporting role in the 2001 TV film, Sa mère la pute. In August 2006, Drakaina relocated to Canada where she is now pursuing her acting career.

Drakaina has been Ariock's spokesmodel since 2001. She also appeared in the 2006 Heavy Metal calendar as a December angel by Lorenzo Sperlonga. She worked with Ariock and Spanish comic artist Mike Ratera on a comic book based on her character, which was later dropped due to conflicting schedules. She was approached by Red Sky Comics to portray the comic book character Warrior Queen but didn't follow suit.

Additionally, she was approached in February 2006 by PETA France to become one of their official spokesmodels.

In 2006, she worked on the Outlander (2007) set starring James Caviezel and Jack Huston.

In 2008, she was given by askmen.com the title of #2 Fantasy art Model worldwide and released her first European art book, "Drakaina Fantasy of Desires".

In 2010, Drakaina was nominated for Faces Magazine Awards in the "Babe the Year" category, and was one of the guests of honor at Hal-Con, one of the largest science fiction conventions in Eastern Canada, where she presented the first issue of the comic book of her image, "Drakaina Untamed". The comic was a huge success, so much that it sold out in 48 hours. Late 2010 saw the release of her 3rd art book, "Drakaina Masters", by SQP Editions, which received an excellent reception from the public, encouraging Drakaina to attend many meetings and book signings with her fans.

=== Personal life ===
Drakaina lives in Toronto, Ontario. From 2006 to 2016, she lived in Halifax, Nova Scotia, pursuing her modeling career. Prior to 2006 she lived in Avignon, France. She lived with French artist and concept designer Ariock, whom she met in 2001 when he was looking for his spokesmodel, and their Shiba Inu Beltane. Drakaina and Ariock separated in early 2010.

== Selected appearances ==
Year	Title	Role	Notes
2010	Drakaina Untamed, the comic book	Drakaina	Incarna comics - Newton Burcham
2010	Drakaina: Masters	Drakaina	SQP publishing - Art book
2010	BloodTini	The Empress	Director: John Rosborough Produced by: DiHL Digital & Rattle Snake Films
2008	Drakaina, Fantasy of Desires	Drakaina, l'art d'etre Muse	SPOOTNIK Editions
2008	Drakaina	Drakaina, A Fantasy art Muse	SQP publishing
2008	We call the shots	Featured dancer/babe	Spesk K and Markit
2007	OUTLANDER	Villager- Kitchen Wench	in production
2006	Heavy metal calendar	December Angel	
2006	Fearotic art by Ariock	Drakaina	
2006	Incroyable mais vrai: TF1	Drakaina, France's first ever Fantasy art Model	television documentary
2006	Magic unofficial trading cards 2005	Character Model - Drakaina	trading cards collectibles
2006	Neotoken	Illusion	trading cards
2001	Sa mere la pute	Red haired hooker	
1996	"This Is Your Night"	Dancer	Amber

== Interviews & articles ==
- The science, the fiction and the fantasy, Fantasy model Drakaina Muse to launch new book, 10/2010
- “Dreaming about Drakaina”, by Sue Carter Flinn, 10/2010
- Interview with Drakaina - the Fantasy Art Muse, 03/2010
- Interview de Drakaina(fr) - GameKult, 07/2010
- French fantasy model finds Bedford a dream, 12/2008
- Interview, 2006, Aliens Café
- Article on Drakaina, from "Fantasy Magazine », italy

== External videos ==
- "Drakaina: first ever Fantasy art Model from France", French documentary on Drakaina, TF1, 2005
- Extract from the french movie Sa mere la pute
