= Jacquelyn Frank =

American novelist

Jacqelyn Frank
- Occupation: Novelist
- Writing career
- Genres: Romance, paranormal, fantasy,
- Website: www.jacquelynfrank.com

Jacquelyn Frank is an author of paranormal romance novels. Her novel Rapture reached number 8 in The New York Times paperback fiction chart.

== Bibliography ==
=== The Nightwalkers ===
1. Jacob (Zebra, 2006)
2. Gideon (Zebra, 2007)
3. Elijah (Zebra, 2007)
4. Damien (Zebra, 2008)
5. Noah (Zebra, 2008)
6. Kane (Zebra, 2011, in Supernatural anthology)
7. Adam (Zebra, 2011)

=== ShadowDwellers ===
1. Ecstacy (Zebra, 2009)
2. Rapture (Zebra, 2009)
3. Pleasure (Zebra, 2009)

=== The Gatherers ===
1. Hunting Julian (Zebra, 2010)
2. Stealing Kathryn (Zebra, 2010)

=== The Three worlds ===
1. Seduce me in Dreams (Ballantine Books, 2011)
2. Seduce me in Flames (Ballantine Books, 2011)

=== The World of Nightwalkers ===
1. Forbidden (Ballantine Books, 2012)
2. Forever (Ballantine Books, 2013)
3. Forsaken (Ballantine Books, 2014)
4. Forged (Ballantine Books, 2014)
5. Nightwalker (Loveswept, 2015) (e-book only release)

=== Immortal Brothers ===
1. Cursed by Fire (Ballantine Books, 2015)
2. Cursed by Ice (Ballantine Books, 2015)
3. Bound by sin (Ballantine Books, 2015)
4. Bound in Darkness (Ballantine Books, 2015)

=== Kiss of Magic ===
1. A Kiss of Magic (Self Published, 2016) (e-book)
2. A Kiss of Fire (Self Published, 2016) (e-book)

=== Energy Vampires ===
1. Thirst (Loveswept, 2017) (e-book)
2. Hunger (Loveswept, 2017) (e-book)
3. Famished (2018) (e-book)

=== Mine to Take ===
1. Warlord (Changeling Press, 2018) (e-book)
2. Conquest (Changeling Press, 2018) (e-book)
3. Valerian (Changeling Press, 2018) (e-book)
4. Melena (Changeling Press, 2018) (e-book)
5. Truce (Changeling Press, 2018) (e-book)
6. Victory (Changeling Press, 2018) (e-book)

=== Single Titles ===
- The Phoenix Project (Zebra, 2010 in Nocturnal anthology)
- Drink of Me (Zebra, 2010)
- Trusted (Self Published, 2016)

== Writing as JAX ==
- The Bid (Aphrodisia, 2010)
- The Science of Pleasure (Aphrodisia, 2013 in The Pleasure Project anthology)
- Hunter (Zebra, 2014)
- Dangerous (Zebra, 2014)
