= Savage Chickens =

Webcomic

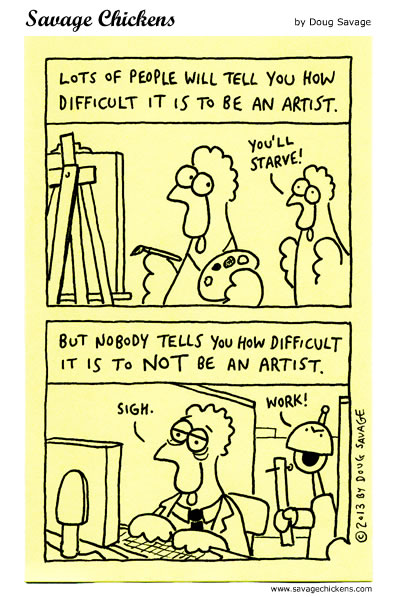
A Savage Chickens comic from 2013

Savage Chickens is a webcomic created by Canadian cartoonist Doug Savage. It is a single panel comic drawn on yellow sticky notes, often featuring alternative humor. Savage Chickens has existed since 31 January 2005 and it contains at least a thousand comics. The page is generally updated daily Monday through Friday. Whereas situations in the comic are primarily carried out through cartoon chickens, other characters, such as Timmy the tasteless tofu, and a mock-up robot boss named PROD3000 are integral characters. Savage supplements his cartooning income with a day job, and has claimed that by day he "edits software manuals in the dark recesses of a giant corporation".

== Characters and themes ==
Almost all characters in the strip are chickens, which have no names or genders. Savage states that the characters can be anybody, allowing readers to "map their own lives onto" the strips, making the relationship jokes flexible for everybody. Otherwise, there is a large cast of non-chicken recurring characters, such as Timmy the tasteless tofu, who often engages in lewd thinking or activities, PROD3000, who portrays a satiric-hyperbolic view of a workplace manager, Worm, an alcoholic bug attorney, and a cast of mutants possessing seemingly useless powers. There are also multiple popular culture references, including Jason Voorhees, Alien, Star Wars, Mr. T, U2's The Edge, Sigmund Freud, and Chuck Norris, along with other popular movies and actors.

Mocking the corporate world is a regular theme of Savage Chickens. Savage states that he finds corporations interesting, "because they're perceived as these monolithic impersonal structures, but they are created by and composed of individual people. People with dreams and hopes and aspirations." The boss character, PROD3000, "is a robot that they themselves created. The corporation is a monster, but it's a monster of our own creation."

== Acclaim ==
Savage Chickens has garnered some critical acclaim. The strip was nominated for Best Comic Strip at the 2006 Weblog Awards, and nominated for “Outstanding Single Panel Comic” for the 2006 Web Cartoonists’ Choice Awards. A comic review site, The Webcomic Overlook, gave it five stars out of five. A 2009 article reported that the site received about 10,000 views each day.

Savage produced a stop-animation style music video in the artistic style of Savage Chickens for a contest to make a music video for singer-songwriter Laura Veirs. Savage's video, which took two weeks to make, won the contest, and the video contest also attracted readers to the comic.

== Books ==
In 2011 a selection of the cartoons were published in a book titled Savage Chickens: A Survival Kit for Life in the Coop.

Savage also created a children's graphic novel, Laser Moose and Rabbit Boy, based on the Laser Moose character from Savage Chickens, which has had two sequels.
