= Innerspace (TV series) =

Canadian talk show

- Former logo
- Presented by: Ajay Fry; Morgan Hoffman; Teddy Wilson
- Country of origin: Canada

Production
- Production location: 299 Queen Street West
- Running time: 30 minutes

Original release
- Network: Space
- Release: 2009 – May 28, 2018

Related
- HypaSpace

Innerspace, styled as InnerSpace, is a Canadian talk show devoted to news in science fiction, which served as the flagship program of Canadian TV channel Space. The show covered film, television, video games, technology, comic books, gadgets, and other news related to the sci-fi genre. Its hosts were Ajay Fry, Morgan Hoffman, and Teddy Wilson. The show was cancelled on May 24, 2018, due to financial strain.

== History ==
InnerSpace began as HypaSpace in 2002. In 2008, it became The Circuit and brought Ajay Fry on to host. In 2007, with the show re-titled InnerSpace, Teddy Wilson joined as co-host. Two years later, Cynthia Loyst joined the team, before leaving to join The Social. Morgan Hoffman joined the show shortly after that.

Prior to 2009, Space aired a daily news segment called SpaceNews. Videographer Natasha Eloi looked at "what's new" in space and the sciences. SpaceNews Monthly was a best-of show based on these interstitials. Both programs finished their runs at the end of September and October 2005, respectively. Natasha Eloi joined InnerSpace as host and field reporter covering various events happening in the world of sci-fi entertainment. Natasha also hosted and produced a series of segments seen on InnerSpace focused on toy collectibles and high-end prop replicas. "It Came From The Basement With Natasha Eloi" showcased toy collections from fans and celebrities which aired from 2005 to 2010.

== Specials ==
"InnerSpace Presents" were hourlong specials featuring cast and creators of popular sci-fi TV shows & movies.

Notable episodes feature:

- March 2009: cast of Battlestar Galactica
- June 2010: David Blue and Andy Mikita from Stargate Universe
- November 2010: cast and creators of Stargate Universe
- January 2011: cast of Being Human
- July 2012: cast of Doctor Who
- August 2013: cast of The Mortal Instruments: City of Bones
- October 2016: cast of Doctor Who and Class (2016 TV series)

== Hosts ==
- Ajay Fry (2009-2018)
- Teddy Wilson (2009-2018)
- Morgan Hoffman (2013-2018)
- Cynthia Loyst (2011-2013)
- Natasha Eloi (2009-2011)

== Podcasts ==
InnerSpace has 174 iTunes podcasts which offer a weekly report on the Sci Fi, Fantasy, and Horror featured on Space. InnerSPACE features popular podcasts from 2010 on their main page which are listed below

Podcast	Date	Hosts
William Gibson, Clone Wars, and the movie Monsters	29 October 2010	Mark Askwith, Natasha Eloi
TBBT, The Scream Awards, and William Gibson at IFOA	15 October 2010	Mark Askwith, Teddy Wilson
Supernatural; Wes Craven's My Soul To Take	8 October 2010	Mark Askwith, Natasha Eloi
John Hurt on Alien, The latest trends in horror	22 October 2010	Mark Askwith, John Hurt
Hal-Con, Caprica, SGU LIVE	11 May 2010	Mark Askwith, Ajay Fry
SPACE-Mas, Reel Asian Film Fest, and More	12 November 2010	Mark Askwith, Natasha Elo
Your Holiday Comic Book Shopping List	19 November 2010	Mark Askwith, Christopher Butcher
Year-End entertainment review, interviews with Ryan Robbins and Gavin Stephens	24 December 2010	Mark Askwith, Amy Pagnotta

== Blogs ==
InnerSpace cast and crew have blogged on current events in the Sci Fi community with their earliest archive being September 2009. Blogs featured images, videos as well as up-to-date information on events, appearances, new releases, and upcoming projects. Events they have written about include spoilers on the seventh installment of the Harry Potter movie, a guide to San Diego Comic-Con, and information on Space's winning commercials at the Promax Awards. Each blog page may include links to related articles, links to articles by the same author, trailers of the featured content, and a comment box allowing for anonymous 2000-character posts. Blog authors include Rob Moden, "Abelle", "The Crimson King", podcast host Mark Askwith, and finally the hosts of the show itself.

== Awards ==
InnerSpace and co-hosts Ajay Fry and Teddy Wilson were honoured in July 2011 by the Constellation Awards, Canada's awards for excellence in science fiction film and television. The two hosts received the award for Outstanding Contribution to Science Fiction Film or Television through popular fan response/submission and earned 39% of the vote over their competitors: actors Amanda Tapping and Robin Dunne, and author Robert J. Sawyer.
