= Tanner Zipchen =

Canadian actor and host

Tanner Zipchen is a Canadian actor and host. From 2015 to 2020 he was the host of the pre-show for Cineplex Entertainment.

== Career ==
In 2015, Zipchen applied to an open casting call from Canadian theatre chain Cineplex to host their pre-show; a series of short games and interviews played in front of movies at Cineplex theatres. After a lengthy campaign and cross Canada vote, Zipchen was voted into the top 3. After completing additional challenges, he ultimately won the vote and was awarded the role of Cineplex Pre-Show Host.

On January 13, 2020, Zipchen announced he had been let go by Cineplex. It was later revealed, in an article about working for exposure in the industry, that since his initial work as host was considered a “prize” and not a job by Cineplex, he was not paid but instead compensated in Scene points, a reward program used by Cineplex to award free movies to its customers.

Along with actively working as an actor, making appearances in The Boys and Private Eyes, Zipchen can also be found in the Dark Pictures Anthology game, Little Hope.

== Filmography ==
=== Film ===
Year	Title	Role	Notes
2018	Clara	Bar Patron	
2019	Run This Town	Club Goer	
2019	Blood Quantum	Gate Zombie	
2019	The Cuban	Orderly	
2019	Canadian Strain	Rival Dealer	
2019	ReanAmour	Patient	Short film
2020	Heart Attack Man	Police Officer	Short film
2021	Yeti	Tony Miller	Short film
2022	I Like Movies	Video Store Hottie	

=== Television ===
Year	Title	Role	Notes
2020	The Boys	Entertainment Reporter	
2020	Private Eyes	Shawn	
2022	What We Do in the Shadows	Host Vampire	

== Personal life ==
Zipchen was born in Saskatoon, Saskatchewan. He is married to Kelsey Zipchen, who is an on-set teacher in the film and television industry. They both reside in Toronto, Ontario.
