= Morgan Hoffman (journalist) =

Canadian entertainment journalist

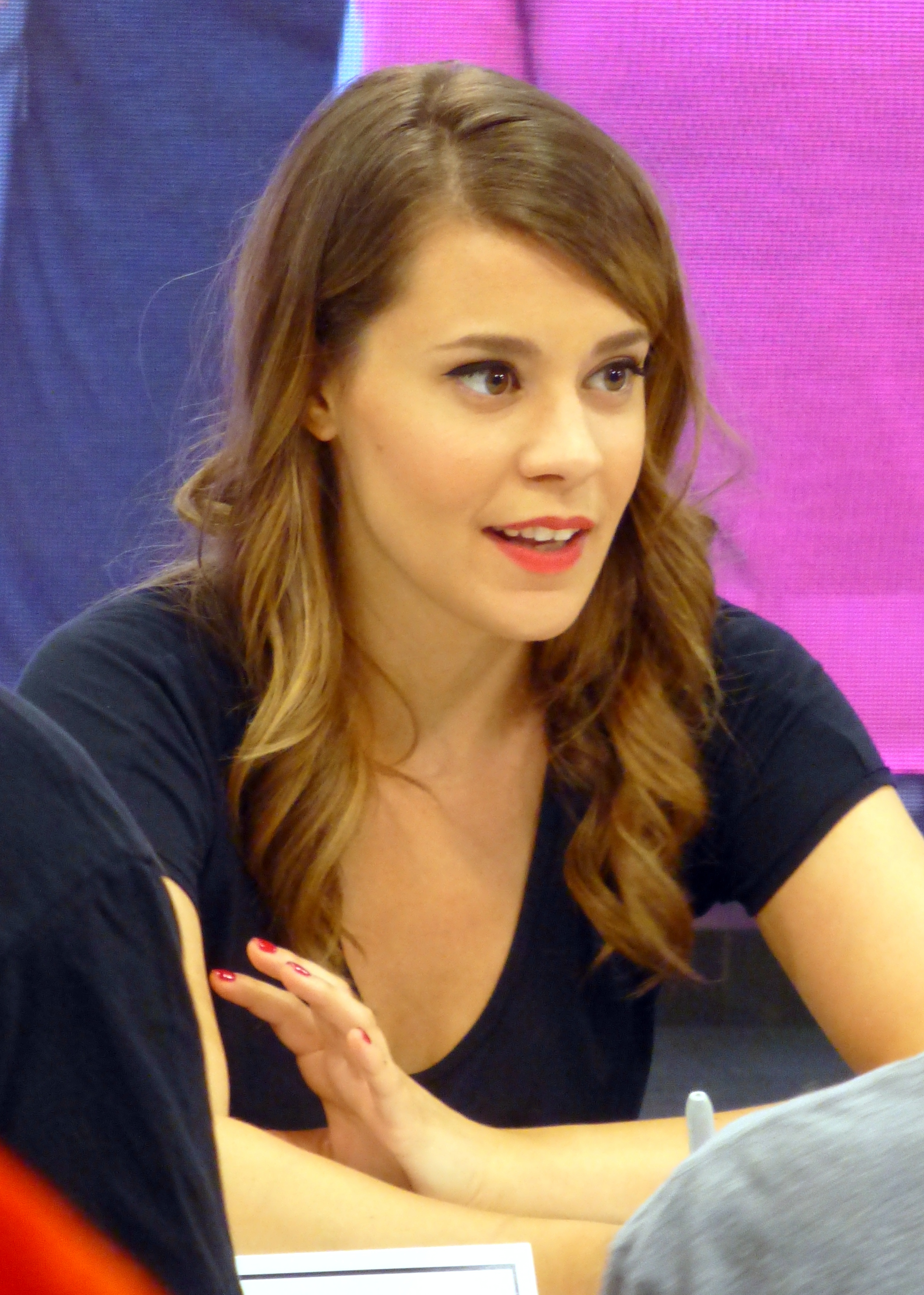
Hoffman in 2015

Morgan Hoffman is a Canadian entertainment journalist and television host, best known as a correspondent for Entertainment Tonight Canada from 2019 to 2023.

Prior to joining ET Canada, she was a host of Innerspace from 2013 to 2018.

Along with her ET Canada colleagues Cheryl Hickey, Roz Weston, Sangita Patel, Carlos Bustamante and Keshia Chante, she won two Canadian Screen Awards for Best Host in a Web Program or Series at the 10th Canadian Screen Awards in 2022 and the 11th Canadian Screen Awards in 2023, for her work on ET Canada Live, the program's regular series of entertainment news updates on social networking platforms. With ET Canada, she was also the host of Royal Rewind, a digital series covering news related to the British royal family.

Following the cancellation of ET Canada in 2023, she moved to Global Television Network's The Morning Show as an entertainment reporter. In June 2026, Global announced that Hoffman will host TMS2, a one-hour afternoon edition of The Morning Show slated to premiere in September.

== Awards ==
Award	Date of ceremony	Category	Recipient(s)	Result	Ref(s)
Canadian Screen Awards	2022	Best Host in a Web Program or Series	ET Canada Live with Cheryl Hickey, Roz Weston, Sangita Patel, Carlos Bustamante, Keshia Chante	Won	
Canadian Screen Awards	2023	Best Host in a Web Program or Series	ET Canada Live with Cheryl Hickey, Roz Weston, Sangita Patel, Carlos Bustamante, Keshia Chante	Won	
Canadian Screen Awards	2024	Best Host, Talk Show or Entertainment News	Entertainment Tonight Canada with Cheryl Hickey, Sangita Patel, Carlos Bustamante, Keshia Chante, Brittnee Blair, Jed Tavernier	Nominated	
Canadian Screen Awards	2025	Best Host, Talk Show or Entertainment News	The Morning Show with Jeff McArthur, Carolyn Mackenzie	Nominated	
