= Constellation Awards =

Canadian sci-fi award

- Awarded for: Sci-fi awards
- Date: 2007
- Country: Canada
- Presented by: TCON Promotional Society
- Website: http://constellations.tcon.ca/

The Constellation Awards were a set of Canadian awards given annually for the best science fiction or fantasy works and achievements of the previous year. The event was founded in 2007. Constellation Awards are the only Canadian sci-fi award where the Canadian public select the nominees and winners in all categories. The awards were held at Toronto area hotels every year, but attendance and interest declined over time; the final awards were given 2014. The awards were run by the TCON Promotional Society, a not-for-profit organization that also ran several other Toronto-area fan events including the Toronto Trek, Polaris, Polar Chill, and Reversed Polarity fan conventions.

== Categories ==
=== Television ===
- Best Male Performance in a Science Fiction Television Episode
- Best Female Performance in a Science Fiction Television Episode
- Best Science Fiction Television Series of the year

=== Film/TV Movie/Mini-Series ===
- Best Male Performance in a Science Fiction Film, TV Movie, or Mini-Series
- Best Female Performance in a Science Fiction Film, TV Movie, or Mini-Series
- Best Science Fiction Film, TV Movie, or Mini-Series of the year

=== Other ===
- Best Technical Accomplishment in a Science Fiction Film or Television Production
- Best Overall Science Fiction Film or Television Script
- Outstanding Canadian Contribution to Science Fiction Film or Television in the year

== Winners ==
| | 2007 | 2008 | 2009 | 2010 | 2011 | 2012 | 2013 | 2014 |
|---|---|---|---|---|---|---|---|---|
| Best Male Performance in a Science Fiction Television Episode | David Tennant; Doctor Who | David Tennant; Doctor Who | Michael Hogan; Battlestar Galactica | David Tennant; Doctor Who | Adam Baldwin; Chuck | Robin Dunne; Sanctuary - Fugue | Niall Matter; Primeval: New World - Truth | Jordan Gavaris; Orphan Black - Variations Under Domestication |
| Best Female Performance in a Science Fiction Television Episode | Claudia Black; Stargate SG-1 | Carey Mulligan; Doctor Who | Catherine Tate; Doctor Who | Lena Headey; Terminator: The Sarah Connor Chronicles | Anna Torv; Fringe | Ming-Na; Stargate Universe - Epilogue | Rachel Nichols (actress); Continuum - A Stitch in Time | Tatiana Maslany; Orphan Black - Variations Under Domestication |
| Best Science Fiction Television Series of the year | Doctor Who | Doctor Who | Doctor Who | Supernatural | Stargate Universe | Stargate Universe | Continuum | Orphan Black |
| Best Male Performance in a Science Fiction Film, TV Movie, or Mini-Series | Hugo Weaving; V for Vendetta | Will Smith; I Am Legend | Robert Downey Jr. Iron Man | Karl Urban; Star Trek | Johnny Depp; Alice in Wonderland | Andy Serkis; Rise of the Planet of the Apes | Mark Ruffalo; The Avengers | Benedict Cumberbatch; Star Trek Into Darkness |
| Best Female Performance in a Science Fiction Film, TV Movie, or Mini-Series | Natalie Portman; V for Vendetta | Emma Watson; Harry Potter and the Order of the Phoenix | Claudia Black; Stargate: Continuum | Zoe Saldaña; Avatar | Chloë Grace Moretz; Kick-Ass | Olivia Wilde; Cowboys & Aliens | Sarah Silverman; Wreck-It Ralph | Sandra Bullock; Gravity |
| Best Science Fiction Film, TV Movie, or Mini-Series of the year | Pan's Labyrinth | Transformers | WALL-E | Star Trek | Inception | Rise of the Planet of the Apes | Looper | Gravity |
| Best Technical Accomplishment in a Science Fiction Film or Television Production | Battlestar Galactica visual effects | Transformers transformation effects | WALL-E animations | Avatar visual effects | Doctor Who music | Joel Goldsmith; Stargate Universe music | Frank Griebe and John Toll; Cloud Atlas Cinematography | Tim Webber; Gravity Visual Effects |
| Best Overall Science Fiction Film or Television Script | Stargate SG-1 episode 200 | Supernatural (U.S. TV series) episode What is & what should never be | Doctor Who episode Silence in the library | FlashForward episode No More Good Days | Inception | Stargate Universe episode Twin Destinies | Continuum episode A Stitch in Time | Doctor Who episode The Day of the Doctor |
| Outstanding Canadian Contribution to Science Fiction Film or Television in the year | Doctor Who | Tanya Huff; Blood Ties | Stargate SG-1 franchise | Bruce Greenwood | Teddy Wilson and Ajay Fry; Hosts of InnerSPACE sci-fi show | Stargate Universe | Judith and Garfield Reeves-Stevens, Creators of Primeval: New World | Tatiana Maslany; Orphan Black |

== Events ==
=== Constellation Awards 2007 ===
Constellation Awards 2007 took place on 7 July in the Plaza Ballroom of the Doubletree International Plaza Hotel. Its hosts were Ed the Sock and Liana K.

=== Constellation Awards 2008 ===
Constellation Awards 2008 took place on 12 July in the Plaza Ballroom of the DoubleTree by Hilton - Toronto Airport Hotel. Its host was Rick Green. This year Doctor Who received six nominations, Supernatural, Stargate and Smallville also had multiple nominations.

=== Constellation Awards 2009 ===
The event was in the Grand York Ballroom of the Sheraton Parkway Toronto North Hotel on 11 July. Its host was actress Karen Cliche.

=== Constellation Awards 2010 ===
The event was in Grand York Ballroom of the Sheraton Parkway Toronto North Hotel on 17 July. Its host was Gavin Stephens.

=== Constellation Awards 2011 ===
The 2011 Constellation Awards's hosts were Teddy Wilson & Ajay Fry. It took place in Sheraton Parkway Hotel in Toronto.

=== Constellation Awards 2012 ===
In 2012 Robin Dunne hosted the ceremony in the Sheraton Parkway Hotel in Toronto. Stargate Universe won five from the six awards it was nominated.

=== Constellation Awards 2013 ===
The 2013 Constellation Awards's hosts were Andrew Jackson and Ellen Dubin. It took place at the Holiday Inn Hotel & Suites Toronto/Markham in Toronto as Continuum won 3 of the four awards it was nominated for.

=== Constellation Awards 2014 ===
The 2014 Constellation Awards were hosted by Rick Green again, on Saturday, July 5, 2014, at the Holiday Inn Toronto International Airport. It was the final ceremony.

== See also ==
- Canadian television awards
