= Roz Weston =

Canadian television presenter

- Occupation: Broadcaster
- Known for: The Roz and Mocha Show

Roz Weston is a Canadian broadcaster and author, currently a morning radio co-host of The Roz and Mocha Show on Toronto's CKIS-FM, and a former entertainment reporter at ET Canada.

== Career ==
Weston interned with Howard Stern. He was a producer for a Toronto-based radio morning show before joining TV station Toronto 1. While there, he hosted Toronto's first live, late night talk show Last Call. After the station cancelled that show, he joined Toronto 1's entertainment show The A-List. In September 2005, when The A-List was in the middle of making changes, he made the move to Global TV's entertainment show ET Canada. On July 8, 2009, it was announced that Weston will be adding morning show host to his repertoire as the new voice of Toronto's KiSS 92.5 (formerly Jack FM).

On September 17, 2011, Weston had a street named after him in his home town of Acton, Ontario.

In December 2016, Weston competed on a celebrity edition of cooking show Chopped Canada, finishing in second place behind musician Steven Page.

On April 12, 2022, Weston announced he will be publishing his memoirs. A Little Bit Broken will be released on September 27, 2022, through Penguin Random House. In May 2022, he announced his departure from ET Canada after 17 years, indicating his final day will be June 23.

== Personal life ==
Weston married his longtime girlfriend Katherine Holland in the summer of 2023; together, they have a daughter, Roxy.

Weston and Holland appeared in a 2015 episode of Income Property, after purchasing a rental property.

The Globe and Mail reported in 2015 that because Weston "used to feel overwhelmed every second of the day", he now practises Transcendental Meditation and says, "A 13-hour workday with five hours’ sleep is not a problem."
