= Sangita Patel =

Canadian television personality (born 1979)

- Sangita Patel in 2026
- Born: January 2, 1979 (age 47); Toronto, Ontario
- Spouse: Samir Patel

Sangita Patel (born January 2, 1979) is a Canadian television personality, currently the host of HGTV's Home to Win and the former on-air personality of Entertainment Tonight Canada.

== Life and career ==
Patel completed her university degree in electrical engineering in 2002. After working for a few years as an engineer and obtaining her P. Eng designation, her career path took a sharp turn. Volunteer positions in various media outlets eventually led to a position as a weather presenter on The Weather Network.

Her transition continued after she accepted a position as the weekend weather anchor on CP24. She branched into entertainment and lifestyle when she began filing segments for her very own segment on CityNews called In the City, and later became a regular fill-in on Breakfast Television for both the Weather and Live Eye segments.

She initially joined Entertainment Tonight Canada as a co-host during Cheryl Hickey's maternity leave.

She has also been featured on ET Canada's beauty campaign with Shoppers Drug Mart in 2015. She was part of the holiday season campaign for President's Choice Insiders Collection, aired on the Food Network in December 2015. She was also featured in L'Oréal’s launch of their Extraordinary Oils hair line on their digital platform.

In 2023, Patel was diagnosed with Hurthle cell carcinoma, a rare form of follicular thyroid cancer. She underwent surgery to remove a lump in her neck in October 2023. In January 2024, she underwent a second surgery, as well as radiation, to address the issue. In August 2024, Patel reported on her Instagram account that she was "cancer-free."

She lives in Toronto with her husband and two daughters, Ava and Shyla.

== Other ==
In 2014, she was named one of Hello Magazine Canada 50 most beautiful list.
