= Cheryl Hickey =

Canadian television presenter

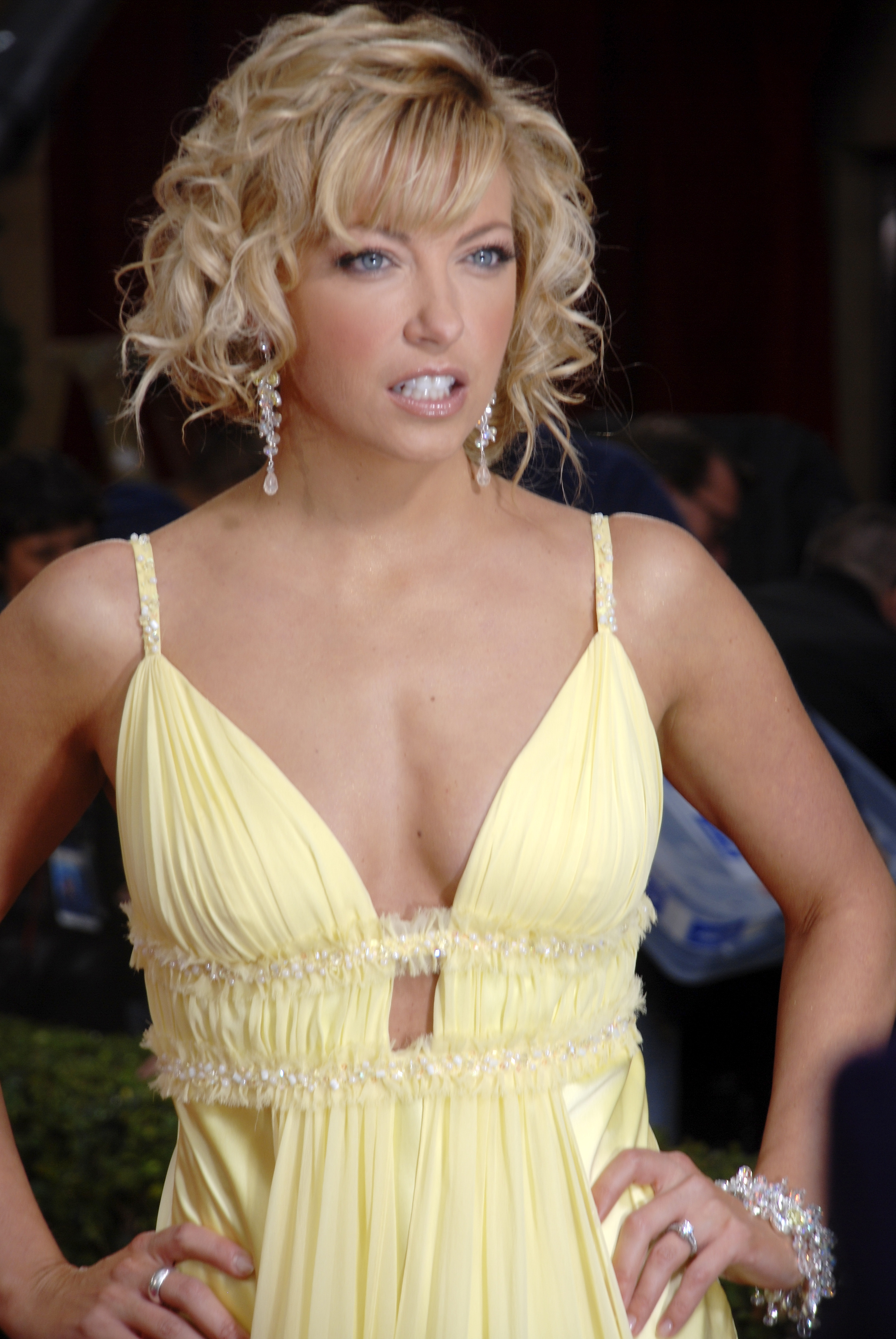
- Hickey at the 2008 Academy Awards
- Born: January 8, 1976 (age 49); Owen Sound, Ontario, Canada
- Occupation(s): Television journalist and personality
- Spouse: Kevin Foley (m. 2008)
- Children: 2

Cheryl Hickey (born January 8, 1976) is the former host of ET Canada, an entertainment news magazine for Global Television Network which launched on September 12, 2005.

== Early life ==
Born in Owen Sound, Ontario, to John Patrick Hickey (1942 – January 13, 2023) and Lori Hickey (née Laycock). At 16 years old, Hickey volunteered at a local cable TV station. She attended Fanshawe College in London, Ontario, where she studied Radio and Television Arts and graduated in 1996.

== Career ==
After graduating, she returned to Owen Sound where she worked at the radio station CFOS. A year-and-a-half later, she moved on to The New VR in Barrie, Ontario. There, she worked as a production assistant, then later became a writer for their six o'clock newscast. At the same time, she learned how to operate a camera and film the news. Hickey eventually began doing a small hosting job in an entertainment spot on the channel.

In May 1999, she joined the Global Television Network where she worked as a photojournalist and as a news chopper reporter. In 2001, she moved on to reporting on entertainment news for Global. Hickey produced and appeared in the documentary special 10 Wired Days, a backstage pass to the Toronto Film Festival which premiered in 2003. In 2005, Hickey auditioned for the role of host for the upcoming Canadian entertainment news program ET Canada. However, after the first round of auditions, Hickey was not selected. The producers of the show later returned to her and offered Hickey the role of female co-host, alongside Rick Campanelli. Campanelli left the program in 2017 and Hickey would host the show alone until 2022 when Sangita Patel was promoted to co-host. In September 2023, it was announced that the show had been cancelled after 18 seasons.

In 2024, it was announced that Hickey would join Rogers-owned Citytv's Breakfast Television, hosting a lifestyle-oriented hour called BT with Tracy and Cheryl with former CityLine host Tracy Moore, but the network announced in January 2025 that the new program would not proceed.

== Personal life ==
Hickey married producer-director Kevin Foley in 2008. Her first child, son Jaxson, was born in 2009. On April 17, 2013, Hickey gave birth to daughter Nyla.
