= This Strange Way of Dying =

2013 collection of short stories by Silvia Moreno-Garcia

- Cover of first edition
- Author: Silvia Moreno-Garcia
- Cover artist: Sara Diesel
- Language: English
- Genre: Fantasy, science fiction, horror
- Publisher: Exile Editions
- Publication date: 8 September 2013
- Publication place: Canada
- Media type: Print (paperback), ebook
- Pages: 206 pp
- ISBN: 9781550963540
- OCLC: 843520578
- Dewey Decimal: 813.6
- LC Class: PR9199.4 .M656174 S77 2013

This Strange Way of Dying is a collection of fantasy, science fiction and horror short stories by Mexican Canadian author Silvia Moreno-Garcia. It was her first book and first collection. It was first published in trade paperback by Exile Editions in September 2013, with an ebook edition following from the same publisher in August 2018.

== Summary ==
The book collects fifteen short works of fiction by the author. Its stories are "infused with Mexican folklore" and feature "creatures that shed their skin and roam the night, vampires in Mexico City that struggle with disenchantment, an apocalypse with giant penguins, legends of magic scorpions, and tales of a ceiba tree surrounded by human skulls."

== Contents ==
- "Scales as Pale as Moonlight" (from Exile Quarterly, May 2011)
- "Maquech" (from Futurismic, July 2008)
- "Stories with Happy Endings"
- "Bed of Scorpions" (from Tesseracts Thirteen, July 2009)
- "Jaguar Woman" (from Shimmer #10, April 2009)
- "Nahuales" (From Toasted Cake #60, February 2013)
- "The Doppelgangers" (2012)
- "Driving with Aliens in Tijuana" (from Expanded Horizons #4, November 2010)
- "Flash Frame" (from Cthulhurotica, January 2011)
- "The Cemetery Man"
- "The Death Collector" (from AE: The Canadian Science Fiction Review, February 2011)
- "This Strange Way of Dying" (from Giganotosaurus, August 1, 2011)
- "Bloodlines" (from v, September 2010)
- "Shade of the Ceibra Tree" (from Kaleidotrope, April 2011)
- "Snow"

== Reception ==
The collection was reviewed by Leah Larson in Dark Discoveries #27 (Spring 2014), and Foz Meadows in Strange Horizons on 15 December 2014.

== Awards ==
The book was nominated for the 2014 Sunburst Award, in the adult category.
