= Silvia Moreno-Garcia =

Mexican-Canadian writer (born 1981)

- Moreno-Garcia in 2026
- Born: 25 April 1981 (age 45); Baja California, Mexico
- Occupations: Novelist; short story writer; editor
- Writing career
- Period: 2006–present
- Genre: Speculative fiction
- Notable works: Signal to Noise; Gods of Jade and Shadow; Mexican Gothic
- Notable awards: WFA–Anthology (2016); BFA–Horror Novel (2021)
- Website: silviamoreno-garcia.com

Cover of Moreno-Garcia's 2019 novel Gods of Jade & Shadow

Silvia Moreno-Garcia (born 25 April 1981) is a Mexican-Canadian novelist, short story writer, editor, and publisher.

== Life and education ==
Moreno-Garcia was born 25 April 1981 in Mexico. Both her parents worked for radio stations. She moved to Canada in 2004. Moreno-Garcia completed a master's degree in science and technology studies at the University of British Columbia in 2016. Her master's thesis focused on eugenics in the work of H. P. Lovecraft. Moreno-Garcia lives in Vancouver.

== Career ==
Moreno-Garcia began her career publishing in various fiction magazines and books, including Exile Quarterly. She was a finalist for the 2011 Manchester Fiction Prize. Her first short story collection, This Strange Way of Dying, was published in September 2013 by Exile Editions. Her second collection, Love and Other Potions, came out in 2014 from Innsmouth Free Press. Her debut novel, Signal to Noise, was published in 2015 by Solaris Books.

She serves as publisher of Innsmouth Free Press, an imprint devoted to weird fiction. With Paula R. Stiles, she co-edited the books Historical Lovecraft (2011), Future Lovecraft (2012), Sword and Mythos (2014), and She Walks in Shadows (2015). With Orrin Grey, she co-edited Fungi (2013). With Lavie Tidhar, she edited The Jewish Mexican Literary Review. In 2016, she and Stiles won a World Fantasy Award—Anthology for She Walks in Shadows.

As of October 2019, Moreno-Garcia is a book columnist for The Washington Post.

In February 2020, her book Gods of Jade and Shadow was announced as a finalist for the 2019 Nebula Award for Best Novel.

Moreno-Garcia's novel Mexican Gothic was published in 2021 to critical acclaim, received the Aurora Award for Best Novel, Locus Award for Best Horror Novel, and British Fantasy Award for Best Horror Novel, and was shortlisted for the Bram Stoker Award for Best Novel and Shirley Jackson Award for Best Novel. Mexican Gothic was selected for the 2023 edition of Canada Reads, where it was championed by Tasnim Geedi.

Moreno-Garcia's 2022 novel The Daughter of Doctor Moreau was a 2023 nominee for the Hugo Award for Best Novel. Her novel Silver Nitrate was published in 2023.

Moreno-Garcia's tenth novel, The Seventh Veil of Salome, was published in August 2024. Kirkus Reviews called the book a "rousing success," noting the 1950s historical drama's strong Golden Age-inspired dialogue and suspense. The New York Times reviewer Lauren LeBlanc wrote of Moreno-Garcia's writing:

"Books that skew more cinematic than conventionally literary are often dismissed as formulaic, but in Moreno-Garcia’s skillful hands, you’ll find the satisfaction of richly drawn characters, saturated settings and deftly constructed plot twists. Inhaling her backlist has been the unexpected delight of my summer. No matter the genre — gothic, horror, noir — she’ll embody its essence with a verve all her own."

== Adaptations ==
In August 2020, Milojo Productions and ABC Signature announced they would produce a limited series adaptation of Mexican Gothic, to be released on the streaming platform Hulu. Moreno-Garcia would serve as executive producer. In an interview with Entertainment Weekly, the author stated that the series was estimated to be "between 8 and 10 episodes max." In April 2024, Moreno-Garcia confirmed Hulu would not be moving forward with the adaptation.

As of January 2025, a television adaptation of The Daughter of Doctor Moreau penned by Debra Moore Muñoz was in development.

== Awards ==
Year Awarded	Work	Award	Category	Result	Ref.
2014	This Strange Way of Dying	Sunburst Award	Adult Novel	Shortlisted	
2016	She Walks in Shadows (Note: As editor, with Paula R. Stiles)	World Fantasy Award	Anthology	Won	
2016	Signal to Noise	Aurora Award	Novel	Shortlisted	
2016	Signal to Noise	British Fantasy Award	Fantasy Novel	Shortlisted	
2016	Signal to Noise	Copper Cylinder Award	—	Won	
2016	Signal to Noise	Locus Award	First Novel	Finalist	
2016	Signal to Noise	Sunburst Award	Adult Novel	Shortlisted	
2017	Certain Dark Things	Locus Award	Horror Novel	Finalist	
2020	Gods of Jade and Shadow	Aurora Award	Novel	Shortlisted	
2020	Gods of Jade and Shadow	Dragon Awards	Fantasy Novel	Shortlisted	
2020	Gods of Jade and Shadow	Ignyte Awards	Adult Novel	Won	
2020	Gods of Jade and Shadow	Locus Award	Fantasy Novel	Finalist	
2020	Gods of Jade and Shadow	Nebula Award	Novel (2019)	Shortlisted	
2020	Gods of Jade and Shadow	Sunburst Award	Adult Novel	Won	
2021	Mexican Gothic	Aurora Award	Novel	Won	
2021	Mexican Gothic	Bram Stoker Award	Novel (2020)	Shortlisted	
2021	Mexican Gothic	British Fantasy Award	Horror Novel (August Derleth Award)	Won	
2021	Mexican Gothic	Locus Award	Horror Novel	Won	
2021	Mexican Gothic	Mythopoeic Awards	Adult Literature	Shortlisted	
2021	Mexican Gothic	Nebula Award	Novel (2020)	Shortlisted	
2021	Mexican Gothic	Shirley Jackson Award	Novel (2020)	Shortlisted	
2021	Mexican Gothic	World Fantasy Award	Novel	Shortlisted	
2021	—	Locus Award	Editor	Finalist	
2022	The Return of the Sorceress	Aurora Award	Novella/Novelette	Shortlisted	
2022	The Return of the Sorceress	Locus Award	Novella	Finalist	
2022	—	Locus Award	Editor	Finalist	
2023	The Daughter of Doctor Moreau	Hugo Award	Novel	Finalist	
2023	The Daughter of Doctor Moreau	Locus Award	Science Fiction Novel	Finalist	
2026	The Bewitching	Aurora Award	Best Novel	Finalist	
2026	The Bewitching	Bram Stoker Award	Novel (2025)	Nominated	
2026	The Bewitching	Locus Award	Horror Novel	Finalist	
2026	"The Lure of Stone"	Aurora Award	Novelette/Novella	Finalist	

== Bibliography ==
=== Novels ===
- —— (2015). Signal to Noise. Solaris Books. ISBN 9781529418026.
- —— (2016). Certain Dark Things. Thomas Dunne Books. ISBN 9781250099082.
- —— (2017). The Beautiful Ones. Thomas Dunne Books. ISBN 9781250099068.
- —— (2019). Gods of Jade and Shadow. Del Rey. ISBN 9780525620754.
- —— (2020). Untamed Shore. Agora Books. ISBN 9781947993921.
- —— (2020). Mexican Gothic. Jo Fletcher Books. ISBN 9781529402650.
- —— (2021). Velvet Was the Night. Del Rey. ISBN 9780593356821.
- —— (2022). The Daughter of Doctor Moreau. Del Rey. ISBN 9781529418026.
- —— (2023). Silver Nitrate. Random House. ISBN 9780593355367.
- —— (2024). The Seventh Veil of Salome. Del Rey. ISBN 9780593600269.
- —— (2025). The Bewitching. Del Rey. ISBN 978-0593874332.
- —— (2026). The Intrigue. Del Rey. ISBN 978-0593874363.

=== Chapbooks ===
- —— (2017). Prime Meridian. Innsmouth Free Press.
- —— (2021). The Return of the Sorceress. Subterranean Press.
- —— (2022). The Tiger Came to the Mountains. Amazon Original Stories.
- —— (2023). The Lover. Amazon Original Stories.

=== Collections ===
- —— (2013). This Strange Way of Dying.
- —— (2013). Other Lives.
- —— (2014). Love and Other Poisons.

=== Short fiction ===
- "Mirror Life" (2006; collected in Other Lives (2013))
- "King of Sand and Stormy Seas" (2006; collected in Other Lives (2013))
- "Water" (2007)
- "Shedding Her Own Skin" (2007)
- "Candles for the Dead" (2008)
- "Maquech" (2008; collected in This Strange Way of Dying (2013))
- "Of Fire and Time" (2008)
- "Enchantment" (2008)
- "Return" (2008)
- "Jaguar Woman" (2009; collected in This Strange Way of Dying (2013))
- "Bed of Scorpions" (2009; collected in This Strange Way of Dying (2013))
- "B'alam" (2009)
- "Sinking Palaces" (2009)
- "The Harpy" (2010)
- "Distant Deeps or Skies" (2010)
- "Seeds" (2010)
- "Salt" (2010; collected in Other Lives (2013))
- "The Manticore" (2010)
- "Weekday" (2010)
- "Bloodlines" (2010; collected in This Strange Way of Dying (2013))
- "Driving with Aliens in Tijuana" (2010; collected in This Strange Way of Dying (2013))
- "The English Cemetery" (2011)
- "Flash Frame" (2011; collected in This Strange Way of Dying (2013))
- "The Death Collector" (2011; collected in This Strange Way of Dying (2013))
- "At the Edge" (2011)
- "Shade of the Ceibra Tree" (2011; collected in This Strange Way of Dying (2013))
- "Scales as Pale as Moonlight" (2011; collected in This Strange Way of Dying (2013))
- "A Handful of Earth" (2011)
- "This Strange Way of Dying" (2011; collected in This Strange Way of Dying (2013))
- "A Puddle of Blood" (2011)
- "Memory" (2011)
- "Collect Call" (2012)
- "The Performance" (2012)
- "In the House of the Hummingbirds" (2012)
- "The Doppelgangers" (2012; collected in This Strange Way of Dying (2013))
- "The Cemetery Man" (2013; collected in This Strange Way of Dying (2013))
- "Iron Justice Versus the Fiends of Evil" (2013)
- "The Gringo" (2013)
- "Nahuales" (2013; collected in This Strange Way of Dying (2013))
- "Them Ships" (2013)
- "Variations of Figures Upon the Wall" (2013)
- "Abandon All Flesh" (2013)
- "River, Dreaming" (2013)
- "Snow" (2013; collected in This Strange Way of Dying (2013))
- "Stories with Happy Endings" (2013; collected in This Strange Way of Dying (2013))
- "The Sea, Like Broken Glass" (2013)
- "Kaleidoscope" (2014)
- "Man in Blue Overcoat" (2014)
- "To See Pedro Infante" (2014)
- "Phrase Book" (2014)
- "Ahuizotl" (2015)
- "Lacrimosa" (2015)
- "In the Details" (2015)
- "Legacy of Salt" (2016)
- "Jade, Blood" (2017)
- Prime Meridian (novella) (2017)
- "Give Me Your Black Wings Oh Sister" (2019)
- "On the Lonely Shore" (2019)
- "Kaleidoscope / Caleidoscopio" (with Carlos Arturo Serrano) (2021)

=== As editor or co-editor ===
- Historical Lovecraft: Tales of Horror Through Time (with Paula R. Stiles) (2011)
- Candle in the Attic Window (2011) with Paula R. Stiles
- Future Lovecraft (with Paula R. Stiles) (2012)
- Innsmouth Magazine: Collected Issues 1-4 (with Paula R. Stiles) (2012)
- Innsmouth Magazine: Collected Issues 5-7 (with Paula R. Stiles) (2012)
- Fungi (with Orrin Grey) (2012)
- Dead North: Canadian Zombie Fiction (2013)
- Sword & Mythos (with Paula R. Stiles) (2014)
- Fractured: Tales of the Canadian Post-Apocalypse (2014)
- She Walks in Shadows (with Paula R. Stiles) (2015)
- Nebula Awards Showcase 2019 (2019)

=== Nonfiction ===
- A Writer's Guide to Speculative Fiction: Science Fiction and Fantasy (with Crawford Kilian) (2019)
