= Gods of Jade and Shadow =

Novel by Silvia Moreno-Garcia

- Cover of first edition
- Author: Silvia Moreno-Garcia
- Cover artist: Daniel Pelavin
- Language: English
- Genre: Fantasy
- Publisher: Del Rey Books
- Publication date: 2019
- Publication place: United States
- Media type: Print (hardcover and paperback), ebook
- Pages: 338
- ISBN: 978-0-525-62075-4

Gods of Jade and Shadow is a historical fantasy novel by Canadian-Mexican novelist Silvia Moreno-Garcia. It was first published in hardcover and ebook by Del Rey Books in July 2019, followed by a trade paperback edition from the same publisher in February 2020. The first British edition was issued in trade paperback by Jo Fletcher Books in February 2020.

== Summary ==
The story is set in the late 1920s as Mexico emerges from its revolutionary era into the Jazz Age. After her father dies, Casiopea Tun and her mother move back to their native Mayan town of Uukumil in the Yucatán, where she grows up as an unwanted poor relation in her wealthy grandfather's house. She is especially tormented by her spoiled, bitter cousin Martín Leyva. At eighteen, Casiopea works as a servant for her grandfather, dreaming of escape.

In a forbidden chest in her grandfather's bedroom, she discovers the bones of the Mayan death god Hun-Kamé. A shard of bone pierces her thumb, restoring Hun-Kamé to a semblance of life. Bound to Casiopea, the god enlists her in his quest to regain his missing body parts, which his twin brother and rival Vucub-Kamé has scattered throughout Mexico and left in the keeping of sorcerers, demons, and other supernatural entities. Once he is whole, he hopes to retake rulership of Xibalba, the Mayan underworld, from which he has been deposed by his brother.

Their journey takes them throughout Mexico, from Yucatán to Veracruz, Mexico City, El Paso, and Baja California. Their parasitic relationship powers their quest, as Casiopea sacrifices more and more of her vitality to Hun-Kamé, and he in turn takes on more and more of the attributes of mortality. As Hun-Kamé becomes increasingly mortal, he and Casiopea start to fall in love with each other, even though both of them know they cannot be together. Throughout their journey, they must deal with the machinations of the god's brother and his inhuman and human allies, particularly Casiopea's cousin Martín, who serves Vucub-Kamé much as she does Hun-Kamé.

The root of the gods’ rivalry lies in Vucub-Kamé's lust to restore the bloody sacrifices and glories of Mayan and Aztec times, which Hun-Kamé is content to leave in the past. Their rivalry ends with both their mortal proxies consigned to Xibalba for a deceptively simple contest: walking the Black Road to the Jade Palace, with the lives of the twin death gods and the fate of the world as the stakes. The one who reaches the palace first wins, but to stray from the road means suffering k’up kaal, the ritual beheading to slake the blood-thirst of the underworld pantheon.

Initially struggling, Casiopea faces the many tricks and enemies that lie upon the Black Road. Once she evades Kamazotz, a giant bat, she gains some confidence and begins to catch up to Martín. However, Martín reaches the foot of the Jade Palace before she even reaches the outskirts of the Black City. Casiopea realizes that there is no way to win the contest, so she declares her allegiance to Hun-Kamé and slits her throat. Her sacrifice is acknowledged as a victory by both Hun-Kamé and Vucub-Kamé. Now the rightful ruler of Xibalba, Hun-Kamé restores Casiopea to life and, inspired by Casiopea's selflessness, forgives his brother instead of punishing him. Casiopea and Martín are returned to the mortal realm, where Martín decides to prolong his absence from Uukumil. Now alone and unsure of her future, Casiopea reunites with Loray, a demon who aided her and Hun-Kamé earlier in their journey. Together they embark on a new adventure with Casiopea fulfilling her long-time dream of learning to drive.

== Reception ==
In a starred review, Publishers Weekly states the author "crafts a magical novel of duality, tradition, and change ... Moreno-Garcia's seamless blend of mythology and history provides a ripe setting for Casiopea's stellar journey of self-discovery, which culminates in a dramatic denouement. Readers will gladly immerse themselves in [the author's] rich and complex tale of desperate hopes and complicated relationships."

Shelley M. Diaz in Library Journal calls the book "a stirring historical fantasy set in the Roaring Twenties and steeped in Mayan mythology. ... Lavish clothes; jazzy music; and ruminations on life, death, fate, and the cosmos combine with blood-drenched nightmares, grisly religious rituals, and road-trip high jinks. An author's note and glossary of Spanish and Nahuatl terms further explores the source material. Snappy dialog, stellar worldbuilding, lyrical prose, and a slow-burn romance make this a standout." She likens its appeal to the works of Naomi Novik, Nnedi Okorafor, and N. K. Jemisin.

Noting that "[m]ore and more fantasy is drawing on mythologies from around the world," Eric Brown observes in The Guardian that "Silvia Moreno-Garcia brings Mayan myths to 1920s Mexico," and "[t]here follows a richly picaresque adventure as Casiopea and Hun-Kamé travel around Mexico on the god's quest. This is a moving description of a young girl's coming of age and a seamless fusion of the real and the magical."

Electra Pritchett in Strange Horizons writes "Gods of Jade and Shadow is not a fairy tale, though it unfolds like one, and it wears the trappings of that paradigm as a god might wear a cloak of feathers. But ... Gods of Jade and Shadow is a hero tale, and Casiopea herself is the protagonist. ... Casiopea does not choose to save herself; she makes the hero's choice, and chooses to save others." She notes that "[a]s fantasy has finally become more inclusive and less Eurocentric over the past decade or so ... it has become possible to imagine books like this one as something more than lapidary one-offs. It may be too much to talk about Gods of Jade and Shadow and, say, Aliette de Bodard's Servant of the Underworld trilogy as trailblazers of Mesoamerican fantasy, but they are certainly part of a larger upwelling of indigenous American themes and settings in the genre—Rebecca Roanhorse's Sixth World series being another recent, excellent example. Although pre-Columbian mythology and magic and the Roaring Twenties may seem like a strange combination, in Moreno-Garcia's hands they comprise an enchanting cocktail, just as Casiopea's unsentimental view on her story is the perfect counterpart to its fantastic and at times hair-raising events. Raise a glass, and keep more like this coming."

== Awards ==
Year	Award	Category	Result	Ref.
2019	Nebula Award	Novel	Nominated	
2020	Aurora Award	Novel	Nominated	
2020	Dragon Award	Fantasy Novel	Nominated	
2020	Ignyte Award	Adult Novel	Won	
2020	Locus Award	Fantasy Novel	Finalist	
2020	Sunburst Award	Adult Novel	Won	
