= Bruce Meyer =

Canadian writer (born 1957)

Dr. Bruce Meyer
- Born: April 23, 1957 (age 69); Toronto, Ontario, Canada
- Spouse: Kerry Johnston (1994-)

Bruce Meyer (born April 23, 1957) is a Canadian poet, broadcaster, and educator. He has authored over 60 books of poetry, short fiction, non-fiction, and literary journalism. He is a professor of Writing and Communications at Georgian College in Barrie and a Visiting Associate at Victoria College at the University of Toronto, where he has taught Poetry, Non-Fiction, and Comparative Literature.

He has appeared on TVO’s More to Life and Big Ideas and CBC’s This Morning with Michael Enright to discuss poetry and the classics. His CBC appearances remain the broadcaster's bestselling spoken-word CD series and inspired his 2000 bestseller The Golden Thread: A Reader’s Journey Through the Great Books.

Recent books of poetry include McLuhan’s Canary (2019), The First Taste: New and Selected Poems (2018), 1967: Centennial Year (2017), The Madness of Planets (2015), The Arrow of Time (2015), Testing the Elements (2014), A Litany of the Makers (2014), A Book of Bread (2011), and The Obsession Book of Timbuktu (2011).

From 1996 to 2003, he was Director of the Writing and Literature Program at the University of Toronto School of Continuing Studies where he created and directed the Creative Writing, Professional Writing, and Literary Studies programs. He has served as the City of Barrie's inaugural poet laureate.

He has organized dozens of literary conferences and festivals including Orillia's Leacock Summer Festival of Canadian Literature, Georgian College's International Festival of Authors and the first Indigenous Writers of Canada Conference, part of 2015's International Festival of Authors in Toronto.

He has given hundreds of talks on poetry, literature, mythology, creative writing, the works of William Shakespeare and the Homeric tradition. In 2000, he delivered the annual Whidden Lecture at McMaster University, a distinction previously bestowed on physicist Robert J. Oppenheimer and playwright Tom Stoppard.

His works have been published in Canada, United States, United Kingdom, Ireland, Switzerland, Italy, Spain, India, Pakistan, China, Nigeria, Bangladesh, Chile, Mexico, Yemen, Greece, Australia, Denmark, Netherlands, and have been translated into French, Spanish, Italian, Dutch, Danish, Hindi, Chinese, Urdu, Bangla, Greek, and Korean.

== Education ==
- Certificate of Post-Doctoral Studies, McMaster University, 1990
- Ph.D., Modern British Poetry, McMaster University, 1988
- Master of Arts, English, University of Toronto, 1982
- Bachelor of Arts, Honour English and Renaissance Studies, Victoria College, University of Toronto, 1980

== Teaching ==
- Visiting Professor, Victoria College, University of Toronto, 2013-
- Professor, University Studies, Liberal Arts, Georgian College, 2007-
- Professor, Laurentian University at Georgian College, 2004-2015
- Special Instructor, University of Toronto, St. Michael's College, 2003–2010
- Professor, Seneca at York Program, 2005

== Career Milestones ==
- Inaugural Poet Laureate, City of Barrie, 2010-2014
- Co-founder, Barrie Arts and Culture Council, 2007-2011
- Artistic Director, Leacock Summer Festival of Canadian Literature, Orillia, 1998-2008
- Founder and director, University of Toronto School of Continuing Studies, Creative Writing and Literary Studies program, 1997-2003
- Writer-in-residence, University of Texas at Austin, 1999
- Writer-in-residence, University of Southern Mississippi, Hattiesburg, 1998
- Researcher/developer, World War One Canadian Literature Collection, National Library of Canada, 1988-1994
- Organizer, Indigenous Writers Conference, Georgian College, and International Festival of Authors, 2013 (a first for Ontario & Canada)
- Broadcaster (with Michael Enright), CBC's This Morning, The Sunday Edition, Great Books, A Novel Idea, Great Poetry: Poetry is Life and Vice Versa
- Discoverer and promoter of lost decade of Canadian Literature—Canada's World War One Trench Literature—published as We Wasn’t Pals: Canadian Poetry and Prose of the First World War (co-edited with Barry Callaghan, afterword by Margaret Atwood); Frank Prewett, The Selected Poems of Frank Prewett (Exile Editions); James Hanley, The German Prisoner (Exile Editions); W. Redvers Dent, Cry Havoc (Rocks Mills Press)

== Select Awards ==
- Bath Short Story Award (UK), finalist, 2019, 2020
- Bannister Poetry Competition, Niagara Branch, Canadian Authors’ Association, runner-up, 2020
- Libretto Chapbook Poetry Prize (NIG), second runner-up, 2020
- Fish Publishing Short Fiction Prize (IRE), finalist, 2020
- Dr. William Henry Drummond Poetry Prize, third place, 2019
- Thomas Morton Fiction Prize (CAN), runner-up, 2019
- Bath Short Story Award (UK), finalist, 2019
- Anton Chekhov Prize for Fiction (UK), winner, 2019
- Retreat West Fiction Prize (UK), finalist, 2019
- Tom Gallon Fiction Prize, Society of Authors (UK), short list, 2019
- National Poetry Prize (UK), short list, 2019
- London Independent Short Story Prize (UK), double short list, 2018
- Fish Publishing Poetry Prize (IRE), short list, 2018
- The Woolf Poetry Prize (Switzerland), winner, 2018
- Freefall Poetry Prize (CAN), third place, 2015, 2018
- Montreal International Poetry Prize, short List, 2015, 2017
- Simcoe Medal for services to the Arts in Barrie, 2017 & Barrie Arts Award, 2015
- Raymond Souster Prize (CAN), finalist, 2016
- Carter V. Cooper Short Fiction Prize (CAN), short list, 2015, 2016
- Barrie Arts Awards, Excellence in the Arts, Lifetime Achievement Award, 2015
- Gwendolyn MacEwen Prize for Poetry (CAN), best single poem winner, 2015, 2016
- Fred Cogswell Prize for best book of poems in Canada, third place, 2015
- Indie Fab Award Finalist (US), Independent Reviewers Association, 2015
- IP Medal best book of poetry (US), Independent Booksellers Association of America, 2015
- Inaugural Poet Laureate, City of Barrie, 2010-2014
- Ruth Cable Memorial Prize for Poetry (US), 1996
- E.J. Pratt Gold Medal and Prize for Poetry, 1980, 1981
- Alta Lind Cook Award (CAN), 1981, 1982
- TV Ontario Best Lecturer Competition, top-ten finalist, 2010
- Lifetime Pass, Baseball Hall of Fame, Cooperstown, New York, 1998
- Quoted on Heritage Toronto Plaque, Queen and Broadview

== Bibliography ==
=== Poetry ===
- The Hart Island Elegies, Urban Farmhouse Press, Windsor (forthcoming, May 2021)
- Grace of Falling Stars, Black Moss Press, Windsor (forthcoming, April 7, 2021)
- Telling the Bees, Libretto Press, Lagos, Nigeria, 2020
- McLuhan's Canary, Guernica Editions, Oakville, 2019
- The First Taste: New and Selected Poems, Black Moss Press, Windsor, 2018
- 1967: Centennial Year, Black Moss Press, Windsor, 2017
- To Linares, Accento and Universidad Technologica Linares, Linares & Guadalajara, Mexico, 2016
- The Madness of Planets, Black Moss Press, Windsor, 2015
- The Arrow of Time, Ronsdale Press, Vancouver, 2015
- The Seasons, Porcupine's Quill, Erin, Ontario, 2014
- Testing the Elements, Exile Editions, Toronto, 2014
- The Obsession Book of Timbuktu, Black Moss Press, Windsor
- A Litany of the Makers, Lyrical Myrical Press, Toronto, 2014
- A Book of Bread, Exile Editions, Toronto, 2011
- Alphabestiary: A Poetry-Emblem Book (with H. Masud Taj), Exile Editions, 2011
- Bread: A Mass for Voices, Lyrical Myrical Press, Toronto, 2009
- Dog Days: A Comedy of Terriers, Black Moss Press, Windsor, 2009
- Mesopotamia, Scrivener Press, Sudbury, 2009
- As Yet, Untitled..., Lyrical Myrical Press, Toronto, 2006
- Oceans, Word Press, Cincinnati, Ohio, 2005
- Oceans, Exile Editions, Toronto, 2004
- The Spirit Bride, Exile Editions, Toronto, 2002
- Anywhere, Exile Editions, Toronto, 2000
- The Presence, Black Moss Press, Windsor, 1999
- The Presence, Story Line Press, Ashland, Oregon, 1999
- Radio Silence, Black Moss Press, Windsor, 1991
- The Open Room, Black Moss Press, Windsor, 1989
- The Open Room, Aquila Press, 1989
- Steel Valley (with James Deahl), Aureole Point Press, 1984
- The Aging of America, Aloysius Press, 1982
- The Tongues Between Us, SWOP, 1981 (36 pages)

=== Fiction ===
- The Hours: Stories from a Pandemic (short stories), AOS Publishing, Montreal, 2021
- Down in the Ground (flash fiction), Guernica Editions, Oakville, 2020
- A Feast of Brief Hopes (short stories), Guernica Editions, Oakville, 2018
- A Chronicle of Magpies (short stories), Tightrope Books, Toronto, 2014
- Flights (short stories), Canadian-Korean Literary Forum Press, Toronto, 2004
- Goodbye Mr. Spalding (short stories), Black Moss Press, Windsor, 1996

=== Non-Fiction ===
- Pressing Matters: A Story of Canadian Small Press Publishing, Black Moss Press, Windsor, 2019
- Portraits of Canadian Writers, Porcupine's Quill, Erin, 2016
- Time of the Last Goal: Why Hockey is Our Game, Black Moss Press, Windsor, 2014
- Alphabet Table: Memoir of a Childhood in the Language, Black Moss Press, Windsor, 2010
- Heroes: The Champions of Our Literary Imaginations, HarperCollins, Toronto, 2007
- Dictionary of Literary Biography, Volume 282: The New Formalists, (co-edited with Jonathan Barron) Bruccoli Clarke Layman, Columbia, South Carolina, 2003
- The Golden Thread: A Reader's Journey Through the Great Books, HarperCollins Canada, Toronto, 2000
- Lives and Works: Interviews with Canadian Writers (with Brian O’Riordan), Black Moss Press, Toronto, 1991
- In Their Words: Interviews with Canadian Writers (with Brian O’Riordan), Anansi, Toronto, 1985
- Poetry Markets for Canadians (with James Deahl), League of Canadian Poets, Toronto, 1983

=== Works edited ===
- That Damned Beaver: Canadian Comedy Writing, Exile Editions, 2018
- Dent, W. Redvers. Cry Havoc, Rocks Mills Press, Oakville, 2018
- Cli-Fi: Canadian Tales of Climate Change, Exile Editions, Toronto, 2018
- We Wasn't Pals: Canadian Poetry and Prose of the First World War 2nd Edition (with Barry Callaghan), Exile Editions, 2014
- The White-Collar Book: Canadian Poetry and Prose of the Professional World (with Carolyn Meyer), Black Moss Press, Windsor, 2011
- Hanley, James. The German Prisoner. Exile Editions, 2007
- Dictionary of Literary Biography, Volume 282: The New Formalists (with Jonathan Baron), Bruccoli Clarke Layman, Columbia, South Carolina, 2003
- Bae-Sa Moh: Writing by Korean-Canadian Youth, KCLF Press, Toronto, 2002
- We Wasn't Pals: Canadian Poetry and Prose of the First World War (with Barry Callaghan), Exile Editions, 2001
- Separate Islands: Contemporary British and Irish Poetry (with Carolyn Meyer), Quarry Press, 1987
- The Selected Poems of Frank Prewett (with Barry Callaghan), Exile Editions, 1987
- Arrivals: Canadian Poetry in the Eighties, Greenfield Press, 1986
- Poetry Markets for Canadians (with James Deahl, 1st ed.), League of Canadian Poets, 1986

=== Edited selected works by other authors ===
- Books by Michael Mirolla, Marty Gervais, Victoria Butler, Antonia Facciponte, Kate Story, Karen Lee White, Christine Ottoni.
- Clarke, James. Selected Poems. Exile Editions, Toronto, 2012
- Stevens, Peter. Swimming in the Afternoon: The Selected Poems of Peter Stevens. [ed. and intro.] Black Moss Press, Windsor, 1992
- Monteith, Lionel. And So He Went Sailing: The Collected Poems of Lionel Monteith. [ed. and intro.] Lincoln Publications, London, 1991
- Tomlinson, Charles. Selected and New Poems. [ed.] Exile Editions, Toronto, 1989
- Wevill, David. Figure of Eight: New Poems and Selected Translations. [ed.] Exile Editions, Toronto, 1987
- Wevill, David. Other Names for the Heart: Selected Poems, 1964-1984. [ed.] ExileEditions, Toronto, 1985
- Deahl, James. No Cold Ash: Selected Poems, 1966–1982. Sono Nis Press, 1984.

=== Cassette Tapes and CDs ===
- Great Poetry: Poetry Is Life and Vice Versa (with Michael Enright), CBC Radio, 2006
- The Great Books, Part One (with Michael Enright), CBC Radio, 1999 [The Bible, The Odyssey, The Theban Plays, The Aeneid, Metamorphoses]
- The Great Books, Part Two (with Michael Enright) CBC Radio, 1999 [Boethius, A Consolation of Philosophy; Saint Augustine, The Confessions; The Quest of the Holy Grail and Sir Gawain and the Green Knight; Dante, Inferno; Dante, La Vita Nuova; Shakespeare, The Sonnets]
- The Great Books, Part Three (with Michael Enright) CBC Radio, 1999 [Vasari, Lives of the Artists; Machiavelli, The Prince; More, Utopia; Shakespeare, King Lear; Shakespeare, The Tempest; Milton, Paradise Lost; Joyce, Ulysses].
- A Novel Idea (with Michael Enright) CBC Radio, 2000 [The Origins of the Novel, The Gothic Novel, The Historical Novel, The Novel of Ideas, The Prophetic Novel, The Role of the Novel].

=== Podcasts ===
- Great Poetry (with Michael Enright and Billy Collins), Ideas, CBC Radio One and CBC Enterprises, March–May 2006

== Articles on Bruce Meyer's Work ==
- Benjamin Ghan. Bruce Meyer: Canadian Writers Series. Guernica Editions, Hamilton (forthcoming, 2023)
- Juan de Dios Torralbo-Caballero. The Poetry of Bruce Meyer: The inaugural poet laureate of the city of Barrie. Granada, Comares. 2015
- T.L. Ponick. Dictionary of Literary Biography. Vol. 282. 2003
