= Mexican Gothic =

2020 novel by Silvia Moreno-Garcia

- Author: Silvia Moreno-Garcia
- Audio read by: Frankie Corzo
- Language: English
- Genre: Gothic horror
- Set in: 1950s Mexico
- Publisher: Del Rey (US, CAN); Jo Fletcher (UK)
- Publication date: June 30, 2020
- Publication place: United States; Canada; United Kingdom
- Media type: Print (hardcover), ebook, audiobook
- Pages: 320 pages
- ISBN: 9780525620785; First edition hardback
- OCLC: 1121602979
- Preceded by: Untamed Shore

Mexican Gothic is a 2020 gothic horror novel by Mexican Canadian author Silvia Moreno-Garcia. It centers on a young woman investigating her cousin's claims that her husband is trying to murder her.

The novel landed on bestseller lists and Moreno-Garcia's writing has received comparisons to Daphne du Maurier and Guillermo del Toro. It won multiple literary awards, including the Aurora Award for Best Novel, Locus Award for Best Horror Novel, and British Fantasy Award for Best Horror Novel; it was a finalist for several other awards.

== Synopsis ==
In 1950s Mexico City, beautiful young socialite Noemí Taboada receives a letter from her cousin Catalina, begging for help. She firmly believes that her English husband, Virgil Doyle, intends to poison her. Suspecting that Virgil may be after Catalina's money, Noemí's father, Leocadio, sends her to the Doyle home, High Place, which is located in the mountains outside of a small town named El Triunfo. Once there, Noemí is struck by the strange and unwelcoming atmosphere of the Doyles' house and the controlling and patronising attitude of its inhabitants.

Catalina is proclaimed to be suffering from consumption and Noemí is mostly kept away from her cousin. During an infrequent visit Catalina begs Noemí to seek out Marta Duval, a healer living in the small village near the mansion, and pick up medicine that could save her. Noemí does so, but the medicine instead causes a seizure that keeps her from freely visiting Catalina as frequently.

As a result of the drastically decreased visits, Noemí spends her time learning about the Doyle family, which also includes Florence Doyle and the frail family patriarch, Howard. The family has a history of incestuous marriages and deep intergenerational traumas, such as one of Howard's daughters, Ruth, killing several family members before shooting herself. Despite being mistreated by Florence and receiving unwanted attention from both Virgil and Howard, Noemí grows closer to one of the Doyles, Francis, who confirms her growing suspicion that the family cannot be trusted.

When she begins to sleepwalk and experience strange dreams and visions, Noemí decides that she must leave the Doyle household, only to be told that she cannot leave. They reveal that Howard discovered a strain of mushroom that has a symbiotic relationship with humans. The Doyles use this fungus and remain at High Place, in which the mushroom and its spores have grown, in order to heal themselves and prolong their lives. Noemí learns that Howard is hundreds of years old, and the history of his immortality is firmly footed in violent histories of colonialism, working class exploitation and misogynist patriarchy.

As the fungus's potency is lessened depending on the individual's genetics, the Doyles have intermarried in order to ensure that their offspring can also receive its benefits. Because it is interlaced with mycelium and infested with the mushroom's spores, the house can hold memories, which the family refers to as the "gloom". The spores also help the Doyles control people who have inhaled them, which frightens Noemí. She grows more horrified, however, when she learns that Howard's wife Agnes was used as a sacrifice to grow the spores – and that Howard can use the gloom to take over the bodies of family members, which he's used to further preserve his own life.

The Doyles have found that Noemí's genetics are complementary to theirs and can help perpetuate their bloodline, as the inbreeding has taken its toll on the family, particularly when it comes to producing viable offspring. Howard tells her that she will marry Francis. What he doesn't tell her, however, is that after the wedding he will inhabit Francis's body. The Doyles also wish to have access to Noemí's money, as the family has become impoverished and no longer runs a successful silver mine as they once did in the town.

Refusing to allow his family to carry out their plans, Francis obtains the medicine Catalina sought out earlier in the novel, as it interferes with the mushroom's abilities. Together he, Noemí and Catalina flee the house and manage to set Agnes's body on fire, presumably killing the rest of the Doyles and destroying the house in the process. Francis, who was bonded to the mycelium through exposure and heredity, is physically affected by the destruction of the fungus. He fully recovers but worries that the fire wasn't enough to eliminate the spores and that he should kill himself to ensure that the family curse is truly ended. Noemí shares his concerns but assures him that together they can overcome any potential adversity.

== Notes from the author ==
Silvia Moreno-Garcia wrote in an afterword her inspirations for the novel. It is based on the real Mexican mining ghost towns, such as Real del Monte, in the Hidalgo mountains, leftover from British colonial rule. Moreno-Garcia notes how Spaniards found gold and silver for extraction and used Indigenous people of Mexico for cheap labor. The War of Independence of 1810 made way for British colonialists to establish themselves in the country. This real history of the region inspired her setting.

== Release and sales ==
Mexican Gothic was released in hardcover and ebook formats in the United States and Canada through Del Rey Books, as well as in the United Kingdom through Jo Fletcher Books, on June 30, 2020. An audiobook adaptation narrated by Frankie Corzo was released on the same day through Random House Audio. Moreno-Garcia has also released a book club tie-in that includes a paper doll accompanied by four outfits modeled after the novel's protagonist, Noemí Taboada.

Sales for the novel were high enough for Mexican Gothic to place on the hardcover bestseller lists for the Washington Post and New York Times.

== Reception ==
Mexican Gothic has received praise for its atmosphere and gothic concepts, which Slate likened to the styles of Daphne du Maurier and Guillermo del Toro.

NPR drew comparisons between the book and "Jane Eyre, Ann Radcliffe's The Mysteries of Udolpho, Dracula, Rebecca and that 1958 classic sci-fi movie, The Blob", also praising its sense of dread. The New York Times drew similar comparisons, citing Mexican Gothic's "spunky female protagonist and an ancient house filled with disturbing secrets".

The book was selected for the 2023 edition of Canada Reads, where it was championed by Tasnim Geedi.

=== Awards and nominations ===
Year	Award	Category	Result	Ref
2020	Bram Stoker Award	Novel	Shortlisted	
2020	Nebula Award	Novel	Shortlisted	
2020	Shirley Jackson Award	Novel	Shortlisted	
2021	Aurora Awards	Novel	Won	
2021	British Fantasy Award	Horror Novel (August Derleth Award)	Won	
2021	Locus Award	Horror Novel	Won	
2021	Mythopoeic Awards	Adult Literature	Shortlisted	
2021	World Fantasy Award	Novel	Shortlisted	

== Adaptation ==
In August 2020 Milojo Productions and ABC Signature announced that they were producing a limited series adaptation of Mexican Gothic, to be released on the streaming platform Hulu. Moreno-Garcia will serve as executive producer. In an interview with Entertainment Weekly, the author stated that the series is estimated to be "between 8 and 10 episodes max". In April 2024, it was confirmed Hulu would not be moving forward with the adaptation.
