= The Island of Doctor Moreau =

1896 science fiction novel by H. G. Wells

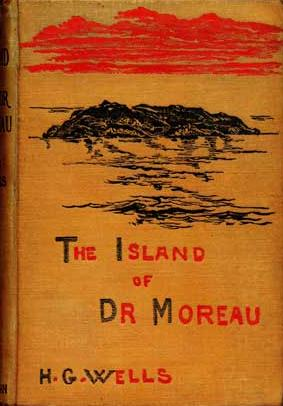
- First edition cover (UK)
- Author: H. G. Wells
- Genre: Science fiction, horror
- Published: 1 January 1896 (Heinemann (UK); Stone & Kimball (US))
- Publication place: United Kingdom
- Text: The Island of Doctor Moreau at Wikisource

The Island of Doctor Moreau is an 1896 science fiction horror novel by English author H. G. Wells. It was published on 1 January 1896. The novel is set between 1 February 1887 and 5 January 1888. The text of the novel is the narration of Edward Prendick, a shipwrecked man rescued by a passing boat. He is left on the island home of Doctor Moreau, a mad scientist who creates human-like hybrid beings from animals via vivisection. The novel deals with a number of themes, including pain and cruelty, moral responsibility, human identity, human interference with nature, and the effects of trauma. Wells described it as "an exercise in youthful blasphemy."

The Island of Doctor Moreau is a classic work of early science fiction and remains one of Wells's best-known books. The novel is the earliest depiction of the science fiction motif "uplift" in which a more advanced race intervenes in the evolution of an animal species to bring the latter to a higher level of intelligence. It has been adapted to film and other media on many occasions.

== Plot summary ==
Edward Prendick is a young scientist from Victorian England who survives a shipwreck of his boat, the Lady Vain, in the southern Pacific Ocean. A passing ship called Ipecacuanha takes him aboard and a man named Montgomery revives him. Prendick also meets a grotesque bestial native named M'ling who appears to be Montgomery's manservant. The ship is transporting a number of animals which belong to Montgomery's employer, most strangely a puma. As they approach the island which is Montgomery's destination, the captain demands Prendick leave the ship with Montgomery. Montgomery explains that he will not be able to host Prendick on the island. Despite this, the captain leaves Prendick in a dinghy and sails away. Seeing that the captain has abandoned Prendick, Montgomery takes pity and rescues him. As ships rarely pass the island, Prendick will be housed in an outer room of an enclosed compound.

The island belongs to Dr Moreau. Prendick remembers that he has heard of Moreau; formerly an eminent physiologist in London whose gruesome experiments in vivisection had been publicly exposed by a journalist, and who fled England as a result of his exposure.

The next day, Moreau begins working on the puma, eventually revealed as being experimented into a woman. Prendick gathers that Moreau is performing a painful experiment on the animal and its anguished cries drive Prendick out into the jungle. While he wanders, he comes upon a group of people who seem human but have an unmistakable resemblance to swine. As he walks back to the enclosure, he suddenly realises he is being followed by a figure in the jungle. He panics and flees, and the figure gives chase. As his pursuer bears down on him, Prendick manages to stun him with a stone and observes that the pursuer is a monstrous hybrid of animal and man. When Prendick returns to the enclosure and questions Montgomery, Montgomery refuses to be open with him. After failing to get an explanation, Prendick finally gives in and takes a sleeping draught.

Prendick awakes the next morning with the previous night's activities fresh in his mind. Seeing that the door to Moreau's operating room has been left unlocked, he walks in to find a humanoid form lying in bandages on the table before he is ejected by a shocked and angry Moreau. He believes that Moreau has been vivisecting humans to turn into half-animals, and that he is the next test subject. He flees into the jungle where he meets an Ape-Man who takes him to a colony of similarly half-human/half-animal creatures including a Sloth-Man. Their leader is a large grey unspecified creature named the Sayer of the Law who has him recite a strange litany called the Law that involves prohibitions against bestial behaviour and praise for Moreau:

Not to go on all-fours; that is the Law. Are we not men?
Not to suck up Drink; that is the Law. Are we not men?
Not to eat Fish or Flesh; that is the Law. Are we not men?
Not to claw the Bark of Trees; that is the Law. Are we not men?
Not to chase other Men; that is the Law. Are we not men?

Suddenly, Moreau bursts into the colony looking for Prendick, but Prendick escapes to the jungle. He makes for the ocean where he plans to drown himself rather than allow Moreau to experiment on him. Moreau explains that the creatures called the Beast Folk were not formerly men, but rather formerly animals. Prendick returns to the enclosure where Moreau explains that he has been on the island for eleven years and has been striving to make a complete transformation of an animal to a human. In some cases, he even combined parts of other animals. He explains that while he is getting closer to perfection, his subjects have a habit of reverting to their animal form and behaviour. Moreau regards the pain he inflicts as insignificant and an unavoidable side effect in the name of his scientific experiments. He also states that pain is an animalistic instinct that one who is truly human cannot have, cutting his thigh with a penknife with no apparent reaction, to further prove his point.

One day, Prendick and Montgomery encounter a half-eaten rabbit. Since eating flesh and tasting blood are strong prohibitions, Moreau calls an assembly of the Beast Folk and identifies the Leopard-Man (the same one that chased Prendick the first time he wandered into the jungle) as the transgressor. Knowing that he will be sent back to Moreau's compound for more painful sessions of vivisection, the Leopard-Man flees. Eventually, the group corners him in some undergrowth, but Prendick takes pity and shoots him to spare him from further suffering. Prendick also believes that although the Leopard-Man was seen breaking several laws, such as drinking water bent down like an animal, chasing men (Prendick), and running on all fours, the Leopard-Man was not solely responsible for the deaths of the rabbits. It was also the Hyena-Swine, the next most dangerous Beast Man on the island and one of the hybrid creations. Moreau is furious that Prendick killed the Leopard-Man, but can do nothing about the situation.

As time passes, Prendick becomes inured to the grotesqueness of the Beast Folk. However one day, the half-finished puma woman rips free of her restraints and escapes from the lab. Moreau pursues her, but the two end up fighting each other, leading to their mutual deaths. Montgomery breaks down and decides to share his alcohol with the Beast Folk. Prendick resolves to leave the island, but later hears a commotion outside in which Montgomery, his servant M'ling, and the Sayer of the Law die after a fight with the Beast Folk. At the same time, the compound burns down because Prendick has knocked over a lamp. With no chance of saving any of the provisions stored in the enclosure, Prendick realizes that Montgomery has also destroyed the only boats on the island during the night.

Prendick lives with the Beast Folk on the island for months after the deaths of Moreau and Montgomery. As the time goes by, the Beast Folk increasingly revert to their original animal instincts, beginning to hunt the island's rabbits, returning to walking on all fours, and leaving their shared living areas for the wild. They cease to follow Prendick's instructions. Eventually, the Hyena-Swine kills Prendick's faithful Dog-Man companion created from a St Bernard. With help from the Sloth Creature, Prendick shoots the Hyena-Swine in self-defense.

Prendick's efforts to build a raft have been unsuccessful. Luckily for him, a lifeboat that carries two corpses drifts onto the beach (perhaps the captain of the ship that picked Prendick up and a sailor). Prendick uses the boat to leave the island and is picked up three days later. When he tells his story, he is thought to be mad, so instead he feigns amnesia.

Upon his return to England, Prendick is no longer comfortable in the presence of humans, all of whom seem to him to be about to revert to an animal state. He leaves London and lives in near-solitude in the countryside, devoting himself to chemistry and astronomy in the studies of which he finds some peace.

== Main characters ==
=== Humans ===
- Edward Prendick – The narrator and protagonist
- Dr Moreau – A mad vivisectionist who has fled upon his experiments being exposed and has moved to a remote island in the southern Pacific Ocean to pursue his research of perfecting his Beast Folk
- Montgomery – Moreau's assistant and Prendick's rescuer. A physician who enjoyed a measure of happiness in England, he is an alcoholic who feels some sympathy for the Beast Folk.

=== Beast Folk ===
The Beast Folk are animals which Moreau has experimented upon, giving them human traits via vivisection for which the surgery is extremely painful. They include:

- M'ling – Montgomery's servant who does the cooking and cleaning. Moreau combined a bear, a dog, and an ox to create him. As Prendick describes M'ling, he states that M'ling is a "complex trophy of Moreau's skill, a bear, tainted with dog and ox, and one of the most elaborately made of all the creatures". He has glowing eyes and furry ears. M'ling later dies protecting Montgomery from the other Beast Folk on the beach.
- Sayer of the Law – A large, grey-haired animal of unspecified combinations (though Edward notices its gray hair is similar to that of a Skye Terrier as well as sporting talons) that recites Dr. Moreau's teachings about being men to the other Beast Folk. The Sayer of the Law serves as a governor and a priest to the Beast Folk. He is later killed in an unseen clash between Montgomery, M'ling, and the Beast Folk.
- Ape-Man – An unspecified ape that considers himself equal to Prendick and refers to himself and Prendick as "Five Men", because they both have five fingers on each hand, which is uncommon among the Beast Folk. He is the first Beast Man other than M'ling to whom Prendick speaks. The Ape-Man has what he refers to as "Big Thinks" which on his return to England, Prendick likens to a priest's sermon at the pulpit.
- Sloth Creature – A small, pink sloth-based creation described by Prendick as resembling a flayed child. He is one of the more relatively benign creatures and helps Prendick kill the Hyena-Swine before fully regressing.
- Hyena-Swine – A carnivorous hybrid of a spotted hyena and a pig who becomes Prendick's enemy in the wake of Dr. Moreau's death. He is later killed by Prendick in self-defence.
- Leopard-Man – A leopard-based rebel who breaks the Law by running on all fours, drinking from the stream, and chasing Prendick. The Leopard-Man is killed by Prendick to spare him further pain, much to the dismay of Dr. Moreau.
- Ox-Men – A group of gray ox-based creatures who appear twice, first when Prendick is introduced to the Beast Folk and then again after Montgomery's death.
- Satyr-Man – A hybrid of a goat and an ape. Prendick describes him as unsettling and "Satanic" in form.
- Swine-Men and Swine-Woman – A group of pig-based Beast Folk who appear during Prendick's introduction to the Beast Folk.
- Mare-Rhinoceros Creature – A hybrid between a horse and a Sumatran rhinoceros who appeared during Prendick's introduction to the Beast Folk.
- Wolf-Men and Wolf-Women – A group of wolf-based Beast Folk who appear during Prendick's introduction to the Beast Folk.
- Bear-Bull Man - A hybrid of a bear and a male bovine who appeared during Prendick's introduction to the Beast Folk.
- Dog-Man – A Beast Man created from a St. Bernard who, near the end of the book, becomes Prendick's faithful companion. He is so like a domestic dog in character that Prendick is barely surprised when he reverts to a more animalistic form. The Dog-Man is later killed by the Hyena-Swine.
- Fox-Bear Woman – A female hybrid of a fox and a bear who passionately supports the Law. Prendick quickly takes a dislike to her and described her as being evil-smelling.
- Wolf-Bear Man - A hybrid of a wolf and a bear who was mentioned during the hunt for the Leopard-Man as hunting his fellow Beast-Folk a wee-bit too much.
- Half-Finished Puma-Woman – The last beast-person created by Moreau. She is halfway through her process of being turned into one of the Beast Folk, but was in so much pain from the surgery that she uses her strength to break free of her restraints and escape. Moreau then chases after her with a revolver. He and the creature fight each other which ends in a mutual kill.
- Ox-Boar Man - A hybrid of an ox and a wild boar who appeared briefly following the death of Moreau.
- Ocelot-Man – A Beast Man created from an ocelot and one of the smaller creatures which briefly appears after Moreau's death. He is shot by Montgomery during his fight with the Beast Folk on the beach.

== Reception ==
The publication of the novel caused an outrage among critics and the media. The London Times called it "loathsome and repulsive". Famous zoologist Peter Chalmers Mitchell was hired by the Saturday Review to write a review, where he called Wells a scientific heretic. The humour magazine Punch published a parody called "The Island of Doctor Menu", by James F. Sullivan. The attention and publicity helped make it Wells' best selling novel to date.

== Historical context ==
At the time of the novel's publication in 1896, there was growing discussion in Europe of the possibility of the degeneration of the human race. Increasing opposition to animal vivisection led to formation of groups like the National Anti-Vivisection Society in 1875, and the British Union for the Abolition of Vivisection in 1898. The Island of Dr Moreau reflects the ethical, philosophical, and scientific concerns and controversies raised by these themes and the ideas of Darwinian evolution which were disrupting social norms in the late 1800s.

In his preface to The Works of H. G. Wells (Atlantic Edition) Volume 2 (1924), Wells explains that The Island of Dr Moreau was inspired by the trial of Oscar Wilde.

"The Island of Doctor Moreau" was written in 1895, and it was begun while "The Wonderful Visit" was still in hand. It is a theological grotesque, and the influence of Swift is very apparent in it. There was a scandalous trial about that time, the graceless and pitiful downfall of a man of genius, and this story was the response of an imaginative mind to the reminder that humanity is but animal rough-hewn to a reasonable shape and in perpetual internal conflict between instinct and injunction. This story embodies this ideal, but apart from this embodiment it has no allegorical quality. It is written just to give the utmost possible vividness to that conception of men as hewn and confused and tormented beasts. When the reader comes to read the writings upon history in this collection, he will find the same idea of man as a re-shaped animal no longer in flaming caricature, but as a weighed and settled conviction.

— Wikisource

== The Island of Doctor Moreau in popular culture ==
The novel has been adapted to films and other media on multiple occasions. In addition, the novel has influenced many fictional works. The following are some of the works which are related to the character of Dr. Moreau and his story:

=== In literature ===
- Maurice Renard's 1908 French novel Le Docteur Lerne, sous-dieu was inspired by The Island of Doctor Moreau, and dedicated to H. G. Wells by its author.
- The Invention of Morel (1940) by Adolfo Bioy Casares is a reinterpretation of the novel's themes by an Argentinian novelist.
- In chapter 1 of Daniel Pinkwater's novel Lizard Music (1976), Victor watches a late-night film on TV which is identified in chapter 2 as The Island of Dr. Morbo.
- Moreau's Other Island (1980) by Brian Aldiss is an updating of the original to a near-future setting. US Under-Secretary of State Calvert Madle Roberts is cast ashore on the eponymous island where he discovers the cyborgised Thalidomide victim Mortimer Dart carrying on Moreau's work. It transpires that Dart's work is intended to produce a 'replacement' race that can survive a post-nuclear environment, and that Roberts approved Dart's funding.
- Forests of the Night (1993) by S. Andrew Swann is a novel set in Cleveland 100 years in the future, in which "moreau" is used as a name for genetically engineered intelligent anthropomorphic animals. Three sequels, Emperors of the Twilight, Specters of the Dawn, and Fearful Symmetries, develops the background of anthropomorphic animals further.
- JLA: Island of Dr. Moreau (2002) is an Elseworlds one-shot tale from DC Comics where Dr. H.I. Moreau and his assistant Professor Ivo create a counterpart of the Justice League called the Justifiers of Law to the Anointed out of uplifted animals. The group consists of Dianna (a white gorilla and counterpart of Wonder Woman), Komodo (a komodo dragon), Jubatus (a cheetah and counterpart of Flash), Delphinius (a dolphin and counterpart of Aquaman), Bernardus (a St. Bernard with several electric eels fused to his right arm), Black Arrow (a bear/porcupine hybrid and counterpart of Green Arrow), and Dirus Falconus (an uplifted hawk/wolf and counterpart of Black Canary). Moreau sends the Justifiers after Jack the Ripper, who is revealed to be an uplifted orangutan that was thought dead by Moreau. As in the novel, the animals start returning to their animal behaviour, leading to them and Dr. Moreau killing each other in a scuffle, with Ivo also being killed during the conflict.
- In The League of Extraordinary Gentlemen, Volume II (2002–2003), Moreau is relocated to the South Downs by the British Government, where he continues his experiments, creating a number of children's characters, such as Rupert Bear, Mr. Toad and Peter Rabbit. He is also stated to be the uncle of the painter Gustave Moreau.
- Sherlock Holmes: The Army of Dr. Moreau (2012) by Guy Adams puts Sherlock Holmes and Doctor Watson on the trail of several of the hybrids on the loose in London which leads him to Dr. Moreau.
- The Madman's Daughter trilogy (2013) by Megan Shepherd tells the story of Dr. Moreau's daughter Juliet. Each book is based on a different classic novel: the first book is based on this novel by Wells, the second one on Robert Louis Stevenson's Strange Case of Dr Jekyll and Mr Hyde (1886), and the final book is based on Mary Shelley's Frankenstein (1818).
- The Isles of Dr Moreau (2015) in Heather O'Neill's short story collection Daydreams of Angels tells of a grandfather who, when he was young, meets an eccentric, albeit humane scientist named Dr Moreau on "the Isle of Noble and Important and Respectable Betterment of Homo sapiens and Their Consorts". Moreau's experiments involve combining animal DNA with human DNA and the story unfolds as the grandfather meets (and dates) several of these humanoid creatures.
- The Strange Case of the Alchemist's Daughter (2017) by Theodora Goss features the half-finished puma woman from The Island of Dr Moreau as one of its main characters, Catherine.
- The Daughter of Doctor Moreau (2022) by Silvia Moreno-Garcia is a novel billed as "a dreamy re-imagining of The Island of Doctor Moreau set against the backdrop of nineteenth-century Mexico."

=== In music ===
- The "Manimals" referenced in the lyrics to "Jason and the Argonauts" by XTC were based on the book's creatures.
- The song "Toes" by the alternative rock band Glass Animals is based on the book's story.
- The music video for the song "Eaten Alive" by Diana Ross, with Ross playing the role of the Panther Woman.
- The debut studio album by the American new wave band Devo was titled Q. Are We Not Men? A: We Are Devo! (1978) from a line in the litany of the Law, spoken by the Speaker of the Law to the Beast Folk.
- Hip-hop group House of Pain took their name from the novel.
- The song "No Spill Blood(song)" from the band Oingo Boingo is inspired on the 1932 film adaptation Island of Lost Souls
- The studio album by the nu metal band Tallah titled The Generation of Danger (2022) is, as stated by vocalist Justin Bonitz, inspired by the book's story.
- The lyrics to "Supernature" by Cerrone were "built around" the novel.

=== In radio ===
- David Calcutt adapted the story for a BBC Radio 4 Saturday Night Theatre dramatization in 1990, with Kenneth Colley as Montgomery, Garard Green as Moreau, Terry Molloy as M'Ling, Kim Wall as Prentice and Neal Foster as Prentice's Nephew.
- Jonathan Pryce read a five-part abridgement for Book at Bedtime on BBC Radio 4 in 2008.
- In 2017, Big Finish Productions adapted the story into a two-hour audio drama starring Ronald Pickup as Doctor Moreau with John Heffernan as Edward Prendick and Enzo Cilenti as Montgomery.

=== In television ===
- A codified copy of The Island of Doctor Moreau is featured throughout the science-fiction series Orphan Black (2013-2017). Additionally, elements of the show's fifth season resemble the story: much of it is set in the isolated island village of Revival, where the human experiments carried out by the enigmatic P.T. Westmorland (Stephen McHattie) recall those of Moreau.
- The 2010 Canadian children's animated comedy show Spliced is based on the book. The scientist who created them was arrested when the authorities raided his island and took him away. This left his creations to fend for themselves.
- The Simpsons

=== In cinema ===
- Ile d'Epouvante (1913, The Island of Terror), a French silent film (also spelled L'Ile d'Epouvante and Isle d'epouvante). The 23-minute, two-reel film, directed by Joe Hamman in 1911 was then released in 1913. By late 1913, the film had been picked up by US distributor George Kleine and renamed The Island of Terror for its release in Chicago.
- Die Insel der Verschollenen (1921), a German silent adaption directed by Urban Gad.
- Island of Lost Souls (1932), with Charles Laughton as Doctor Moreau, and Bela Lugosi as the Sayer of the Law. In the film, Dr. Moreau creates his Beast Folk through "plastic surgery, blood transfusions, gland extracts, and ray baths". In addition, the Sayer of the Law is depicted as a humanoid wolf. Another addition is Lota (Kathleen Burke), a woman Moreau derived from a panther, set upon to mate with Edward (Richard Arlen), so Moreau can find out whether or not she can bear human children. Lota was not a character from the original novel (the closest is a half-finished puma woman), but filmmakers of future adaptations apparently loved her so much, they included a feline love interest in their adaptations, which include Barbara Carrera as Maria in the 1977 version, and Fairuza Balk as Aissa in the 1996 version.
- At the age of 13, Tim Burton made an amateur adaptation on Super-8 of Wells' novel as The Island of Doctor Agor (1971).
- The Twilight People (1972), starring John Ashley and with an early role for African-American actress Pam Grier, is Eddie Romero's version of the original story.
- The Island of Dr. Moreau, a 1977 film with Burt Lancaster and Michael York. In this film, Dr. Moreau injects the animals with a serum containing human genetic material. The Sayer of the Law is depicted as a Wolf-Man. The Leopard-Man is replaced by a Bull-Man which resembles an American bison. There are also humanoid versions of lions, tigers, bears, and wild pigs.
- The Island of Dr. Moreau (1996), a New Line-produced film with Marlon Brando, Val Kilmer, David Thewlis, Fairuza Balk, and Ron Perlman. In this film, Dr. Moreau introduces human DNA into the animals in his possession to make them more human. The film's version of the Sayer of the Law is depicted as a blind goat-like hybrid. Unlike the books and earlier films, the Sayer of the Law survives the ordeal and sees off the main protagonist.
- The film Dr. Moreau's House of Pain (2004), made by cult horror studio Full Moon Pictures, is billed as a sequel to the novel.
- The 2013 film Cloudy with a Chance of Meatballs 2 shares similarities with the novel with the food on Swallow Falls having been made into Foodimals by the seemingly-destroyed FLDSMDFR.
- Christopher Lambert plays Dr. Moreau in the 2018 Italian horror film La Voce del Lupo (Voice of the Wolf).

== Scientific plausibility ==
In the short essay "The Limits of Individual Plasticity" (1895), H.G. Wells expounded upon his firm belief that the events depicted in The Island of Doctor Moreau are entirely possible should such vivisective experiments ever be tested outside the confines of science fiction.

== See also ==
- The Tempest
- Frankenstein
- Forbidden Planet
- Jurassic Park
