= Signal to Noise (Moreno-Garcia novel) =

2015 novel by Silvia Moreno-Garcia

- Author: Silvia Moreno-Garcia
- Genre: Fantasy
- Publisher: Solaris Books
- Publication date: February 2015
- Publication place: Canada
- Media type: Print (paperback)
- Pages: 272 (Solaris Books) (paperback edition)
- ISBN: 978-1-78108-299-7

Signal to Noise is an urban fantasy novel by Canadian Mexican author Silvia Moreno-Garcia. The novel was published by Solaris Books in February 2015. Moreno-Garcia stated that she was inspired to write the novel based on her parents, who both worked at a radio station.

== Plot ==
In 2009, Mercedes "Meche" Vega returns to Mexico City to attend the funeral of her DJ father. While there she reminisces about her life in the city in 1988 when she was fifteen and how she accidentally discovered, along with her best friends Sebastian and Daniela, that she could perform spells by listening to songs.

=== 1988 Plot ===
In 1988, Meche discovers how to use music to cast magic spells. She invites her friends, Sebastián and Daniela to join her in casting spells to help them achieve their dreams. All 3 of them are outsiders at their school. Meche is the weird girl who is only interested in music. Sebastián is a bookworm who is bullied by the other boys in school. His family doesn't have a lot of money and his father is abusive. Daniela is often lost in her own world dreaming of the perfect romance. Her family is well off, but her mother is over protective of her. Meche's grandmother, who once dabbled in magic herself, warns her that magic has a cost, but Meche doesn't listen. She and her friends merely want to be accepted into the popular group at school and to find love. Meanwhile, Meche's parents, Vicente and Natalia, are on the verge of divorce. Vicente is a radio announcer who is ever working on a book about the history of rock music. Natalia has tried to break into the modeling and acting world but doesn't have the skills for it. Natalia also doesn't like Meche spending so much time with Sebastián, concerned that Meche will end up getting pregnant and wasting her life.

Meche, Sebastián, and Daniela use the magic to attract money into their lives. They finish their spell to find nothing has changed and are disappointed. Several days later however, Sebastián comes across an empty wallet full of money. The three friends use the money to buy themselves clothes that will allow them to fit in at a party being thrown.

At the same time, Meche and Sebastián are wrestling with feelings they have for each other although neither of them will admit it. Both of them are more interested in the conventionally attractive Constantino and Isadora. At the party, Meche and Constantino dance, but Sebastián doesn't have the same luck with Isadora. Days later however, she approaches him and apologizes for how she behaved, stating that she was going through some personal stuff. She invites him to go watch a movie with her group of friends. Sebastián goes, but is warned by Constantino to stop hanging around Isadora. When Sebastián pays no attention to that, he is later beat up by Constantino and 5 of his friends. Sebastián escapes by running and casting a glamour spell that allows him to disguise himself as an old man. Isadora comes to his house later and apologizes. When Sebastián asks if she's merely using him to get back at Constantino, she admits that there are deeper feelings.

Vicente, feeling trapped by his marriage, has been having an affair for a while. He has dreams of moving to Puerto Vallarta and spending his days on the beach while finishing his book. The woman he is seeing tells him that her brother has an investment opportunity. This ends up being a scam and Vicente loses all the money he and his wife had set aside for Meche to use for her university tuition. Shamed, Vicente leaves his family.

Meche continues to practice her magic, discovering that certain albums have more power than others. She is drawn to them by their warmth. Slowly, she starts to outpace Sebastián and Daniela in her usage of magic, which worries them. Meche asks her grandmother for stories and tips, although the grandmother has long forgotten her spells. Meche and her friends each choose an object which will be the source of their power. They keep this hidden from the rest of the group. Meche also begins working on a grimoire to record their knowledge.

Daniela, who has a crush on a teacher, signs up for his tutoring lessons. While at the tutoring lesson, her teacher begins to caress her breast and makes an advance, stating that he knows how she looks at him. Daniela tells him she feels uncomfortable with this and when he continues, she kicks him, and runs away. She is distraught and locks herself in her room. When Meche finds out what happens, she goes to the principal of the school who defends the teacher. Meche, infuriated by this, vows revenge. She signs up for one of his tutoring lessons. When she gets there, she asks for a glass of water which she clumsily drops, causing it to shatter. She then begins to tell the teacher that she knows what truly happened. When the teacher says there is nothing she can do about it, Meche reveals her magic knowledge. She uses her magic to throw the shards of glass in his face, letting him know that if he returns to school, she will do much worse. She then takes revenge on the principal, making her vomit up a sludge.

Her friends become scared about this new darkness in Meche and try to stand up against her. Meche says that she is merely correcting the wrongs in the world. In an attempt to bring her parents back together, Meche looks for a specific album that will help cast a love spell. She finds it one day and is excited. Sebastián however, thinks that she is going to use it to get Constantino to fall in love with her. Still angry at how he was beat up by Constantino, Sebastián waits until Meche leaves her house and then tricks her grandmother into letting him in saying Meche was going to let him borrow some albums. He grabs both the album that Meche found, as well as the one that is the source of her power.

Sebastián uses the first album to help Isadora fall in love with him. Meche, who discovered what happened, stumbles upon Sebastián as he is kissing Isadora. Later on, Sebastián tells her that he didn't want her to use it to make Constantino fall in love with her and Meche angrily says that she was saving it for her parents as she didn't want them to get divorced. Angry at him, Meche, forces Daniela to help her cast a spell that will hurt Sebastián. Meche unwittingly creates a darker spell than intended, although she doesn't know it. A dark force takes over Sebastián motorcycle, almost killing him. Meche's grandmother senses that Meche has unleashed a dark spell that is meant to kill. Although she can't remember any of her old magic, she knows enough to be able to cast one quick spell with her knitting needles. This makes the death spell, merely a spell that will injure the person. The cost of her spell is that she gets a stroke and is rushed to the hospital. Natalia says that they will have to send her to Monterrey so that she can recover with another family member.

Sebastián, angry at what has happened, confronts Meche with Daniela at his side. Meche threatens them until Sebastián pulls out the album that is her source of power and breaks it. Meche runs out of the room. She goes to her mother and says that she wants to go with her grandmother to Monterrey. Natalia refuses and Meche says she will go live with her father. Natalia tells Meche about how her father wasted her money, but Meche refuses to listen. She goes to her father and asks to move in with him. When he gives excuses, Meche confronts him and asks if he really wasted her money. He admits it and Meche leaves. From that day forward, she would never speak to her father or friends again.

== Reception ==
The novel received generally positive reviews upon publication. In April 2015 it was named one of the Best Science Fiction Novels of the Month in The Guardian.

== Awards ==
Year	Award	Category	Result	Reference
2016	Aurora Awards	Novel	Shortlisted	
2016	British Fantasy Award	Fantasy Novel	Shortlisted	
2016	Copper Cylinder Award	Adult	Won	
2016	Locus Award	First Novel	Finalist	
2016	Sunburst Award	Adult	Shortlisted	
