= The Daughter of Doctor Moreau =

2022 novel by Silvia Moreno-Garcia

- Author: Silvia Moreno-Garcia
- Language: English
- Set in: Yucatan, Mexico
- Published: 19 Jul 2022
- Publisher: Del Rey
- Pages: 320
- ISBN: 978-0-593-35533-6

The Daughter of Doctor Moreau is a 2022 novel by Mexican-Canadian writer Silvia Moreno-Garcia. It is loosely based on H. G. Wells's The Island of Doctor Moreau (1896). The novel received mixed reviews, with critics noting its exploration of feminism and colonialism. The novel was a finalist for the 2023 Hugo Award for Best Novel and 2023 Locus Award for Best Science Fiction Novel.

== Plot ==
In 1871, Carlota Moreau lives with her father, Dr. Moreau, at the hacienda Yaxaktun. She has a chronic illness and requires weekly treatments to stay healthy. Dr. Moreau's experiments involve the creation of human-animal hybrids. Carlota spends much of her time with two hybrids named Cachito and Lupe, as well as the mayordomo Montgomery.

By 1877, Moreau's financial situation is precarious. The hacienda's owner, Hernando Lizalde, is losing faith that Moreau's research is a good investment. Hernando's son Eduardo visits Yaxaktun with his cousin Isidro. After a brief courtship, Eduardo proposes to Carlota. Moreau approves, hoping that this will secure his finances. Isidro disapproves, and sends Montgomery to tell Hernando.

Hernando arrives to prevent the marriage. Carlota strikes Hernando; she grows claws and hisses at him. Hernando fires Moreau and tells him to vacate the hacienda. Montgomery forces the three Lizalde men to leave at gunpoint, but they promise to return with more men. Moreau reveals that Carlota is a hybrid. She does not truly need her weekly injections; he has been drugging her in order to keep her docile and to keep her jaguar traits submerged. Carlota angrily shoves Moreau, injuring him.

Carlota releases the hybrids; most of them choose to seek shelter with nearby Mayan rebels. The Lizaldes return. Eduardo promises that he will still take Carlota as his mistress, but she rejects him. Montgomery and Lupe assist the other hybrids in escaping, then return for a final confrontation. Isidro, Dr. Moreau, and Hernando are all killed. In her anger, Carlota's jaguar traits emerge; she and Montgomery work together to kill Eduardo.

Montgomery and Carlota blame all of the deaths on rebels. With her inheritance, Carlota promises to build a safe home for the surviving hybrids. Montgomery leaves to search for them, but promises to return.

== Themes ==
According to D. Harlan Wilson of the Los Angeles Review of Books, The Daughter of Doctor Moreau re-examines the views of H. G. Wells. Wilson writes that "looking backward at Wells becomes increasingly difficult given the white male ethos that utterly dominates his oeuvre". Many of his novels "see him project Englishness onto the entire world", resulting in a colonization of those fictional worlds.

Wilson writes that Moreno-Garcia utilizes religion to explore themes of control. Moreau often gives sermons in which he tells the hybrids that their pain is a gift. This evokes sympathy in the reader. By the end of the novel, Carlota rejects the view of God as a vengeful deity and adapts a worldview more compatible with panentheism.

Wilson also writes that the theme of patriarchy is most exemplified by the subplot involving Carlota's romance with Eduardo. Initially, she is naive and feels that she loves Eduardo. As she becomes more mature, she realizes that Eduardo sees her "as a doll to carry around". When Moreau stops giving Carlota the injections, her animal nature emerges, "which is also a movement from the culture of her father’s estate to a state of primal nature." After Moreau's death, she is able to "step into her father's role" and kill Eduardo, becoming the hybrids' savior instead of their tormentor. Wilson believes that in feminist science fiction, "culture (especially technological violence) [is] coded as male and nature [is] coded as female."

== Style ==
The novel is divided into three parts and thirty-one chapters. The parts take place between 1871 and 1877. The chapters alternate between the points of view of Carlota and Montgomery. The story is told with third person narration.

== Background ==
The novel is loosely inspired by The Island of Doctor Moreau by H.G. Wells, but Moreno-Garcia makes major changes to the plot and characterization. According to the Los Angeles Review of Books, the author "to a large degree ... tells a different story". The narrator Edward Prendick is replaced by the character of Carlota. Montgomery remains Moreau's alcoholic assistant, but in Moreno-Garcia's interpretation he is given a surname (Laughton) and serves as Moreau's mayordomo. The surname Laughton is a reference to Charles Laughton, who played Doctor Moreau in the 1932 film The Island of Lost Souls, the first English-language screen adaptation of Wells's original work.

Moreno-Garcia transposes the setting from "an unnamed island somewhere between Peru and Chile" to the Yucatán Peninsula. Much of the novel is set against the backdrop of the Caste War of Yucatán.

== Reception ==
Booklist gave the novel a starred review, writing that the novel is elevated by "Moreno-Garcia’s ability to mesh the unease of the scientifically created beasts with the real-life terrors of a life on the margins and the horror of colonialism". Library Journal also gave the novel a starred review, calling it "historical science fiction at its best".

A review in the Los Angeles Review of Books praised the novel's exploration of patriarchy, calling it "a sound feminist critique that decodes the patriarchal protocols of its source material and 19th-century attitudes in general." Writing for Paste, Samantha Sullivan praised the complex and dark themes of the novel, including "existential and moral questions that make [Carlota] ponder her faith, the way people frequently “play god” with others, and what exactly family means." A review in Book Reporter praised the novel's exploration of themes including "European racism toward the Maya people, ... the horrific work of Dr. Moreau, and the ways in which women are vulnerable to misogyny and violence". The review called the result "entertaining and thoughtful".

The CBC called the novel "both a dazzling historical novel and a daring science fiction journey". Ian Mond writes that Moreno-Garcia's novel stands on its own "with its evocative prose, post-colonial historical setting that drives the plot, and the introduction of vibrant, fascinating characters,". The San Francisco Book Review rated the novel four out of five stars, calling it " the perfect modern-day tribute with a feminist spin".

A review for Kirkus noted that the first half of the novel starts off slow, but that the payoff is worth it for the "action-packed second half". The same review called the novel "one of the better [adaptations]" of H.G. Wells's classic work. Publishers Weekly also commented on the "wonky pacing", writing that it "occasionally makes it difficult to remain invested in the action". However, the same review states "the third act rights the ship" and "the ending will linger long in readers’ minds". A review in Strange Horizons called the novel "a mixed bag". Reviewer Archita Mittra called the novel "a chimerical work that arrests the reader’s attention but fails to captivate it", particularly criticizing that the hybrids are used "as props throughout, lacking in emotional complexity".

The novel was a finalist for the 2023 Hugo Award for Best Novel and the 2023 Locus Award for Best Science Fiction Novel.
