= The Limits of Individual Plasticity =

1895 essay by H.G. Wells

"The Limits of Individual Plasticity" is a short essay written by the science fiction author H. G. Wells (21 September 1866 – 13 August 1946) in 1895. In it, Wells speculates his theories on the plasticity of animals, explaining that the default biological form of an animal may be altered in a way that it would continue to survive even if it, in any way, no longer resembles its inherent form. This could, according to Wells, theoretically be achieved through surgical or chemical modification. Wells was fully aware that surgical modification is only a physical change, and would not alter an animal's genetic blueprint. He made note that should an animal be surgically modified, its offspring would most likely retain its parent creature's original physical form.

== Incorporation in novels ==
Wells presented many of his ideas from "The Limits of Individual Plasticity" in his 1896 science fiction novel, The Island of Doctor Moreau. In the novel, a shipwrecked Englishman named Edward Prendick is rescued from the sea and brought to a secluded island by a man named Montgomery, who reveals the island is owned and operated by an eminent British physiologist named Dr. Moreau. Moreau was shunned from the scientific community when his horrific vivisection experiments were brought to the public spotlight. Moreau continued his experiments on vivisection on his private island, where animals are altered with great detail to resemble human beings. They are a defective experiment, as they will revert to their bestial forms after a period of time.
