= Megan Crewe =

Canadian young adult writer

- Born: 1980 (age 45–46); Toronto, Ontario, Canada
- Website: www.megancrewe.com

Megan Crewe is a Canadian young adult writer, born in 1980 in Toronto, Ontario, Canada. She attended high school at Riverdale Collegiate Institute in Toronto before going on to complete a degree in psychology from York University and working as a behavioral therapist for teens in Toronto. She was published by New Canadian Voices, In2Print and the Toronto School Boards poetry and prose periodicals before becoming a young adult writer with a number of books and book series to her name. In 2019 Crewe was on the Sunburst Award Longlist.

== Bibliography ==
- Give Up the Ghost (2009)
- A Mortal Song (2016)
- Beast (2017)

Series

Conspiracy of Magic

- Magic Unmasked (2018)
- Ruthless Magic (2018)
- Wounded Magic (2018)
- Fearless Magic (2019)

Earth & Sky

- Earth & Sky (2014)
- The Clouded Sky (2015)
- A Sky Unbroken (2015)

The Fallen World

- The Way We Fall (2012)
- The Lives We Lost (2013)
- The Worlds We Make (2014)
- Those Who Lived: Fallen World Stories (2016)

Short fiction

- "Seven Years" (2004)
- "The Alien and the Tree" (2006)
- "Frozen" (2006)
- "The Great Thrakkian Rebellion" (2007)
