= Paul Glennon =

Canadian writer

- Occupation: writer
- Writing career
- Period: 2000s-present
- Notable works: How Did You Sleep?, The Dodecahedron

Paul Glennon is a Canadian writer. He was a shortlisted nominee for the ReLit Award in 2001 for his short story collection How Did You Sleep?, and for the Governor General's Award for English-language fiction in 2006 for The Dodecahedron, or A Frame for Frames.

He has since published the Bookweird trilogy of young adult fantasy novels. He won a Sunburst Award in 2011 for Bookweirder, the second book in the trilogy.

Glennon is based in Ottawa, Ontario, and has worked in the city's information technology industry.

== Works ==
- How Did You Sleep? (2000, ISBN 978-0889842151)
- The Dodecahedron, or A Frame for Frames (2005, ISBN 978-0889842755)
- Bookweird (2008, ISBN 978-0385665476)
- Bookweirder (2010, ISBN 978-0385665483)
- Bookweirdest (2012, ISBN 978-0385665490)
