= Political views of H. G. Wells =

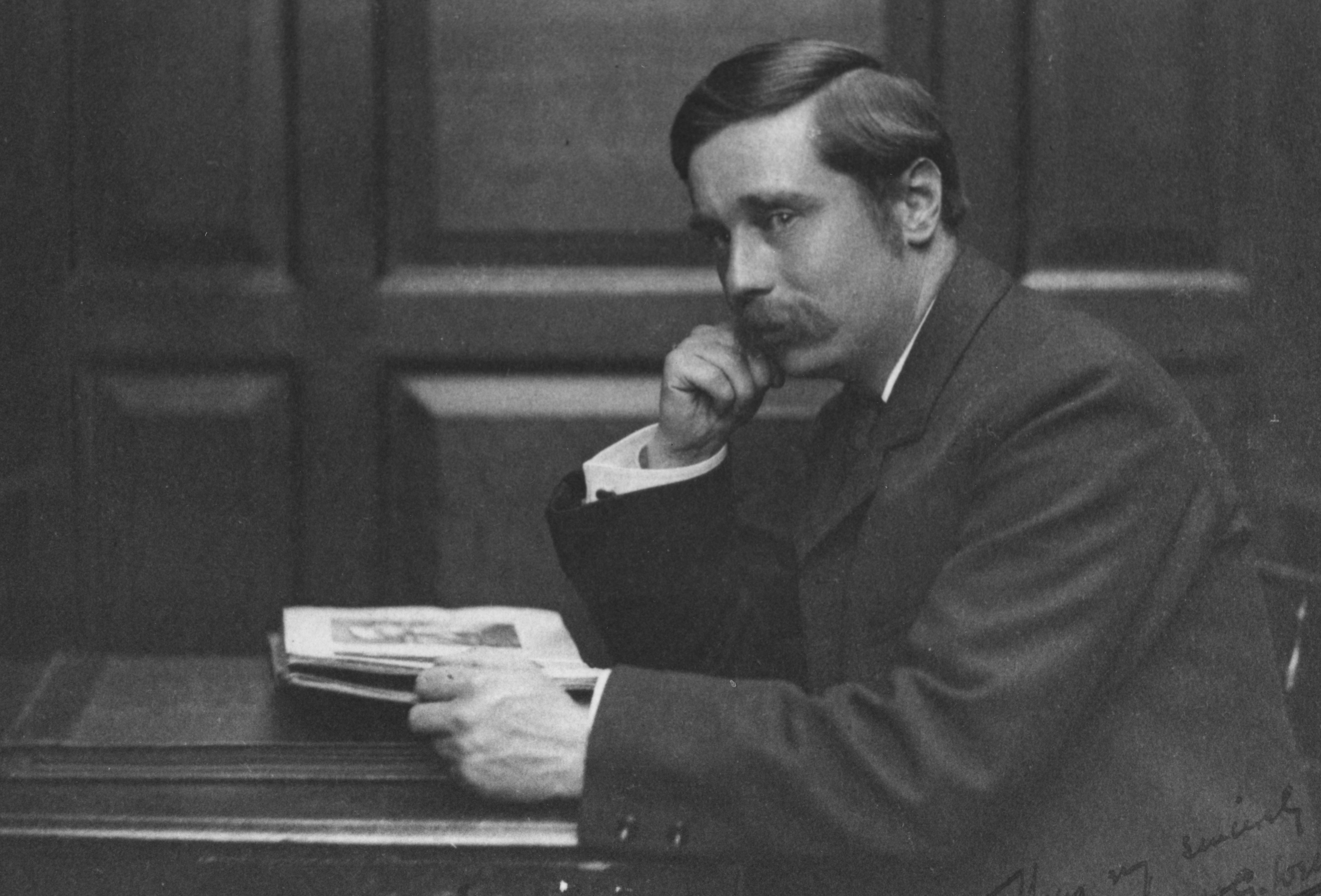
H.G. Wells, c.1890

H. G. Wells was one of the most politically engaged and publicly prominent writers of the late nineteenth and early twentieth centuries. His political views were broadly socialist and progressive, shaped above all by a faith in science, reason, and the capacity of human institutions to be rationally reorganised and planned by an educated and elite-governed state.

Influenced by his education under T. H. Huxley and by the positivist currents of his age, Wells believed that the accumulated failures of nationalism, capitalism, and organised religion could be overcome through enlightened state planning, the end of the profit motive and private industry, and the gradual consolidation of humanity into a single world state. He was associated for an early period with the socialist Fabian Society, though his impatience with its gradualism and his clashes with Sidney and Beatrice Webb led to an acrimonious break in 1908.

Wells's political vision was consistently socialist, internationalist and technocratic. Works such as A Modern Utopia (1905) and The Open Conspiracy (1928) outlined his belief that a self-selected, unelected class of scientifically educated elites could and should guide humanity toward a rationally ordered global civilisation. In the latter, he outlines a political programme aimed towards the "supreme duty of subordinating the personal life to the creation of a world directorate capable of these tasks and to the general advancement of human knowledge, capacity and power."

This vision extended to the biological as well as the social: influenced by T. H. Huxley and Francis Galton, for most of his adult life Wells was a committed and vocal supporter of eugenics and compulsory sterilisation, which he regarded not as incidental to his utopianism but as integral to it, since rational scientific planning of human society logically encompassed, in his view, the managed improvement of the human stock itself by actively selecting out undesirable elements such as those with inheritable diseases or criminal dispositions. His programme was correspondingly sceptical of democracy, which he considered ill-suited to the demands of rational governance, favouring instead cooperative discipline under expert technocratic direction over Marxist class struggle.

He was an early advocate for something resembling what would later be called human rights, and his Declaration of the Rights of Man (1940) is widely regarded as a precursor to the United Nations' Universal Declaration. His views shifted and darkened considerably in his final years, culminating in the bleak pessimism of Mind at the End of Its Tether (1945), in which Wells considers the idea of humanity being soon replaced by some other, more advanced, species of being.

== The Fabian Society ==
Wells was for a time a member of the Fabian Society, a socialist organization, but broke with them as his creative political imagination, matching the originality shown in his fiction, outran theirs. He later grew staunchly critical of them as having a poor understanding of economics and educational reform and left in 1908, but remained committed to socialist ideals.

He ran as a Labour Party candidate for London University in the 1922 and 1923 general elections after the death of his friend W. H. R. Rivers, but at that point his faith in the party was weak or uncertain.

== Class ==
Social class was a theme in Wells's The Time Machine in which the Time Traveller speaks of the future world, with its two races, as having evolved from

the gradual widening of the present (19th century) merely temporary and social difference between the Capitalist and the Labourer ... Even now, does not an East-end worker live in such artificial conditions as practically to be cut off from the natural surface of the earth? Again, the exclusive tendency of richer people ... is already leading to the closing, in their interest, of considerable portions of the surface of the land. About London, for instance, perhaps half the prettier country is shut in against intrusion.

Wells has this very same Time Traveller, reflecting his own socialist leanings, refer in a tongue-in-cheek manner to an imagined world of stark class division as "perfect" and with no social problem unsolved. His Time Traveller thus highlights how strict class division leads to the eventual downfall of the human race:

Once, life and property must have reached almost absolute safety. The rich had been assured of his wealth and comfort, the toiler assured of his life and work. No doubt in that perfect world there had been no unemployed problem, no social question left unsolved.

In his book The Way the World is Going, Wells called for a non-Bolshevik form of socialism to be set up that would avoid conflict between nations.

=== Democracy ===
Fred Siegel of the center-right Manhattan Institute wrote of Wells's unflattering take on American democracy: "Wells was appalled by the decentralised nature of America's locally oriented party and country-courthouse politics. He was aghast at the flamboyantly corrupt political machines of the big cities, unchecked by a gentry that might uphold civilised standards. He thought American democracy went too far in providing leeway to the poltroons who ran the political machines and the 'fools' who supported them." Siegel goes on to note Wells's dislike of America's not allowing African Americans to vote.

== World government ==
His most consistent political ideal was the world state. He stated in his autobiography that from 1900 onward he considered a World State inevitable. He envisioned the state to be a planned society that would advance science, end nationalism, and allow people to progress by merit rather than birth.

Wells's 1928 book The Open Conspiracy argued that groups of campaigners should begin advocating for a "world commonwealth", governed by a scientific elite, that would work to eliminate problems such as poverty and warfare.

In 1932, he told Young Liberals at the University of Oxford that progressive leaders must become liberal fascists or enlightened Nazis who would "compete in their enthusiasm and self-sacrifice" against the advocates of dictatorship.

In 1940, Wells published a book called The New World Order that outlined his plan as to how a World Government would be set up. In The New World Order, Wells admitted that the establishment of such a government could take a long time, and be created in a piecemeal fashion.

== Eugenics ==
H. G. Wells was, for much of his career, a prominent and explicit advocate of eugenics and compulsory sterilisation, a position common among a number of early twentieth-century intellectuals. Influenced by the ideas of Francis Galton and T. H. Huxley, Wells argued across a range of books, essays, pamphlets, letters and debates that the improvement of human society required some degree of conscious control over reproduction, and he frequently wrote about the existence of "unfit" elements within the population whose continued propagation he regarded as socially harmful.

Wells's advocacy of eugenics was closely connected to his broader commitment to advocacy for socialism, and to "his more immediately social policy concerns such as improved housing, better education and universal healthcare." He rejected laissez-faire approaches to both economic and social life, and instead favoured a rationally organised society directed by scientific knowledge and expert administration. Within this framework, eugenics formed part of a wider programme of deliberate social improvement, in which the conditions of life, education, and reproduction would be consciously shaped by scientific experts, rather than left to chance and nature.

In works such as Anticipations (1901), he envisioned a future 'New Republic' led by a scientific elite who would orchestrate the "euthanasia of the weak and sensual" and eliminate "inferior races" to prevent them from hindering human progress, and that "[o]n the principles that will probably animate the predominant classes of the new time, it will be permissible, and I have little or no doubt that in the future it will be planned and achieved." In Anticipations, he also suggested that those unable to live "efficiently and decently" should ultimately "die out", reflecting a belief in the necessity of long-term biological and social reform. Similarly, in A Modern Utopia (1905), he described an 'ideal' society where those suffering from hereditary diseases, severe mental illness, or criminality would be strictly segregated or sterilized.

Similarly, in Men Like Gods (1923), Wells depicted a utopian 'World State' in which human improvement had been achieved over generations through a combination of social organisation and selective reproduction, reflecting a more idealised and less overtly coercive presentation of eugenicist principles. In it, Wells envisions a future where "Utopian science has been able to discriminate among births, and nearly every Utopian alive would have ranked as an energetic creative spirit in former days. There are few dull and no really defective people in Utopia; the idle strains, the people of lethargic dispositions or weak imaginations, have mostly died out; the melancholic type has taken its dismissal and gone; spiteful and malignant characters are disappearing. The vast majority of Utopians are active, sanguine, inventive, receptive and good-tempered."

At the same time, Wells's views on eugenics were neither static nor wholly aligned with more rigid or hereditary-focused models. He expressed scepticism about the practical feasibility of selecting for desirable traits through controlled breeding alone, sometimes called 'positive eugenics', and criticised what he saw as a simplistic misunderstanding of human individuality in some eugenic proposals. In a 1904 discussion of Galton’s work, he argued that "the conscious selection of the best for reproduction will be impossible", instead arguing that "is in the sterilization of failures, and not in the selection of successes for breeding, that the possibility of an improvement of the human stock lies."

In his later writings, including The Rights of Man; or, What Are We Fighting For? (1940), Wells framed his position within a language of universal human rights, advocating prohibitions on practices such as mutilation and torture, and reflecting a partial moderation in tone, though without wholly abandoning his earlier commitment to the idea of human improvement through planned intervention. He wrote that the "positive eugenics of mankind is a mere speculation of the theorists, and we do not believe that the science of genetics is sufficiently sure of itself, for such negative eugenics as the compulsory sterilisation of types capable of transmitting evil hereditable traits. And even if we had that much science, human nature as it is at present revolts against the idea of sterilisation without consent. But there is no reason whatever to forbid it to a willing adult who finds his desires at war with his conscience or his happiness."

== Race ==
In 1901, Wells wrote Anticipations of the Reaction of Mechanical and Scientific Progress Upon Human Life and Thought, which included the following views:

And how will the new republic treat the inferior races? How will it deal with the black? how will it deal with the yellow man? How will it tackle that alleged termite in the civilized woodwork, the Jew? Certainly not as races at all. It will aim to establish, and it will at last, though probably only after a second century has passed, establish a world state with a common language and a common rule. All over the world its roads, its standards, its laws, and its apparatus of control will run. It will, I have said, make the multiplication of those who fall behind a certain standard of social efficiency unpleasant and difficult… The Jew will probably lose much of his particularism, intermarry with Gentiles, and cease to be a physically distinct element in human affairs in a century or so. But much of his moral tradition will, I hope, never die. … And for the rest, those swarms of black, and brown, and dirty-white, and yellow people, who do not come into the new needs of efficiency?

Well, the world is a world, not a charitable institution, and I take it they will have to go. The whole tenor and meaning of the world, as I see it, is that they have to go. So far as they fail to develop sane, vigorous, and distinctive personalities for the great world of the future, it is their portion to die out and disappear.

The world has a greater purpose than happiness; our lives are to serve God's purpose, and that purpose aims not at man as an end, but works through him to greater issues.

Wells's 1906 book The Future in America, contains a chapter, "The Tragedy of Colour", which discusses the problems facing African Americans. While writing the book, Wells met with Booker T. Washington, who provided him with much of his information for "The Tragedy of Colour". Wells praised the "heroic" resolve of African Americans, stating he doubted if the US could:

show any thing finer than the quality of the resolve, the steadfast effort hundreds of black and coloured men are making to-day to live blamelessly, honourably, and patiently, getting for themselves what scraps of refinement, learning, and beauty they may, keeping their hold on a civilization they are grudged and denied.

In his 1916 book What is Coming?, Wells states, "I hate and despise a shrewish suspicion of foreigners and foreign ways; a man who can look me in the face, laugh with me, speak truth and deal fairly, is my brother, though his skin is as black as ink or as yellow as an evening primrose".

In The Outline of History, Wells argued against the idea of "racial purity", stating: "Mankind from the point of view of a biologist is an animal species in a state of arrested differentiation and possible admixture . . . [A]ll races are more or less mixed.".

In 1931, Wells was one of several signatories to a letter in Britain (along with 33 British MPs) protesting against the death sentence passed upon the African American Scottsboro Boys.

In 1943, Wells wrote an article for the Evening Standard, "What A Zulu thinks of the English", prompted by receiving a letter from a Zulu soldier, Lance Corporal Aaron Hlope. "What a Zulu thinks of the English" was a strong attack on anti-black discrimination in South Africa. Wells claimed he had "the utmost contempt and indignation for the unfairness of the handicaps put upon men of colour". Wells also denounced the South African government as a "petty white tyranny".

Wells had given some moderate, unenthusiastic support for Territorialism before the First World War, but later became a bitter opponent of the Zionist movement in general. He saw Zionism as an exclusive and separatist movement which challenged the collective solidarity he advocated in his vision of a world state. No supporter of Jewish identity in general, Wells had predicted the ultimate assimilation of the Jewish people in his utopian novel The Shape of Things to Come. In notes to accompany his biographical novel A Man of Parts, David Lodge describes how Wells came to regret his attitudes to the Jews as he became more aware of the extent of the Nazi atrocities. This included a letter of apology written to Chaim Weizmann for earlier statements he had made.

== First World War ==
He supported Britain in the First World War, despite his many criticisms of British policy, and opposed, in 1916, moves for an early peace. In an essay published that year he acknowledged that he could not understand those British pacifists who were reconciled to "handing over great blocks of the black and coloured races to the [German Empire] to exploit and experiment upon" and that the extent of his own pacifism depended in the first instance upon an armed peace, with "England keep[ing] to England and Germany to Germany". State boundaries would be established according to natural ethnic affinities, rather than by planners in distant imperial capitals, and overseen by his envisaged world alliance of states.

In his book In the Fourth Year published in 1918 he suggested how each nation of the world would elect, "upon democratic lines" by proportional representation, an electoral college in the manner of the United States of America, in turn to select its delegate to the proposed League of Nations. This international body he contrasted with imperialism, not only the imperialism of Germany, against which the war was being fought, but also the imperialism, which he considered more benign, of Britain and France. His values and political thinking came under increasing criticism from the 1920s and afterwards.

== Soviet Union ==
The leadership of Joseph Stalin led to a change in his view of the Soviet Union even though his initial impression of Stalin himself was mixed. He disliked what he saw as a narrow orthodoxy and intransigence in Stalin. He did give him some praise saying in an article in the left-leaning New Statesman magazine, "I have never met a man more fair, candid, and honest" and making it clear that he felt the "sinister" image of Stalin was unfair or false. Nevertheless he judged Stalin's rule to be far too rigid, restrictive of independent thought, and blinkered to lead toward the cosmopolis he hoped for. In the course of his visit to the Soviet Union in 1934, he debated the merits of reformist socialism over Marxism-Leninism with Stalin.

== Monarchy ==
Wells was a republican and an advocate for the creation of republican clubs in the UK. In 1914, Wells referred to the United Kingdom as a crowned republic.

== Other endeavours ==
Wells brought his interest in Art & Design and politics together when he and other notables signed a memorandum to the Permanent Secretaries of the Board of Trade, among others. The November 1914 memorandum expressed the signatories concerns about British industrial design in the face of foreign competition. The suggestions were accepted, leading to the foundation of the Design and Industries Association. In the 1920s he was an enthusiastic supporter of rejuvenation attempts by Eugen Steinach and others. He was a patient of Dr Norman Haire (perhaps a rejuvenated one) and in response to Haire's 1924 book Rejuvenation: the Work of Steinach, Voronoff, and others, Wells prophesied a more mature, graver society with 'active and hopeful children' and adults 'full of years' where none will be 'aged'.

In his later political writing, Wells incorporated into his discussions of the World State a notion of universal human rights that would protect and guarantee the freedom of the individual. His 1940 publication The Rights of Man laid the groundwork for the 1948 Universal Declaration of Human Rights.

== Summary ==
In the end Wells's contemporary political impact was limited, excluding his fiction's positivist stance on the leaps that could be made by physics towards world peace. His efforts regarding the League of Nations became a disappointment as the organization turned out to be a weak one unable to prevent the Second World War, which itself occurred towards the very end of his life and only increased the pessimistic side of his nature. In his last book Mind at the End of its Tether (1945) he considered the idea that humanity being replaced by another species might not be a bad idea. He also came to refer to the Second World War era as "The Age of Frustration".
