= Barry Callaghan =

Canadian author, poet and anthologist

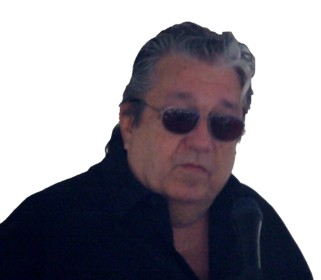
Callaghan in 2007.

Barry Morley Joseph Callaghan (born July 5, 1937) is a Canadian author, poet and anthologist. He is currently the editor-in-chief of Exile Quarterly and the founder of the book publisher Exile Editions. Born in Toronto, Ontario, he is the son of late Canadian novelist and short story writer, Morley Callaghan. He is a graduate of the University of Toronto.

He won the 2019 ReLit Award for short fiction for his collection All the Lonely People. In 2006 Priscita Uppal edited Barry Callaghan: Essays on His Works a volume in the Guernica Editions 'Essential Writers Series' under general editor Joseph Pivato.

== Selected bibliography ==
- The Hogg Poems and Drawings – 1978
- As Close as We Came – 1982
- The Black Queen Stories – 1982
- The Way the Angel Spreads Her Wings – 1989
- Stone Blind Love – 1989
- Canadian Travellers in Italy – 1989 (editor)
- Exile: The First Fifteen Years – 1992 (editor)
- Lords of Winter and of Love: A Book of Canadian Love Poems in English and French – 1993]
- 'When Things Get Worse – 1993
- A Kiss is Still a Kiss – 1995
- This Ain't No Healing Town: Toronto Stories – 1996 (editor)
- Barrelhouse Kings – 1998
- We Wasn't Pals: Canadian Poetry and Prose of the First World War – 2001 (edited with Bruce Meyer)
- Young Bloods: Stories from Exile 1972–2001 – 2001 (editor)
- Between Trains – 2007
- Beside Still Waters – 2009
- All the Lonely People: Collected Stories - 2018
