= Priscila Uppal =

Canadian poet, novelist, and writer (1974–2018)

Priscila Uppal FRSC
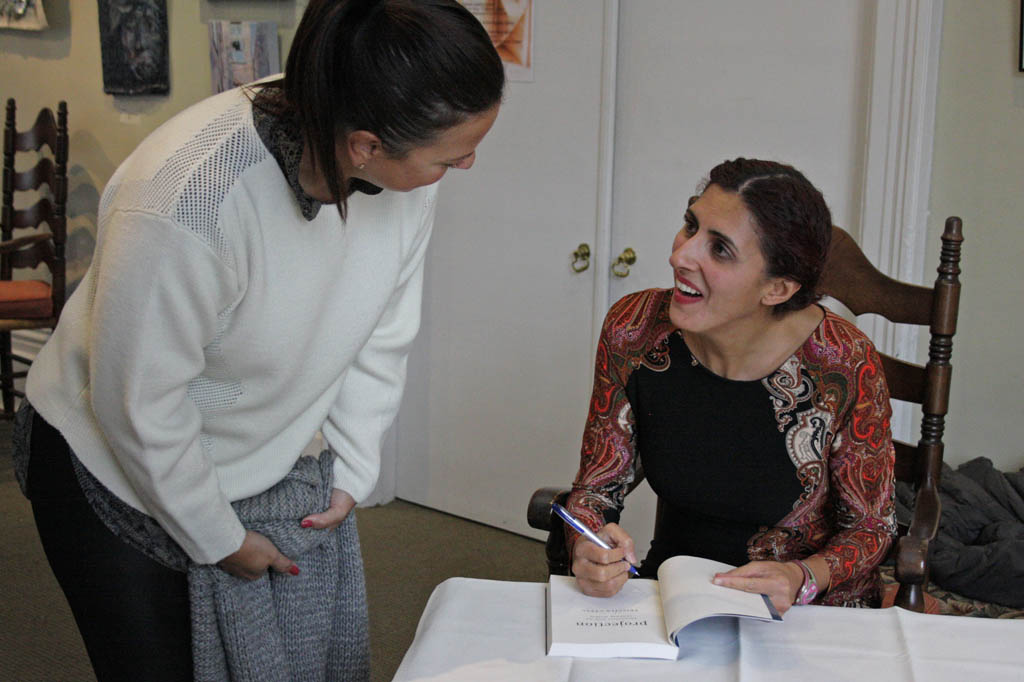
- Born: October 30, 1974; Ottawa, Ontario
- Died: September 5, 2018 (aged 43); Toronto, Ontario
- Occupations: Poet, Novelist, Playwright, Professor

Academic background
- Education: York University (BA. Hons; Ph.D); University of Toronto (MA)

Academic work
- Discipline: English studies
- Institutions: York University

Priscila Uppal FRSC (October 30, 1974 – September 5, 2018) was a Canadian poet, novelist, fiction writer, and playwright. Her poetry addressed various social issues regarding "women, violence, sexuality, culture, religion, illness and loss."

== Personal life and career ==
Uppal was born in Ottawa, Ontario, she graduated from Hillcrest High School in 1993. She earned her Honours Bachelor of Arts from York University in 1997, a Master of Arts degree in English from the University of Toronto, and a Ph.D. from York University in 2004. Following graduation, she was a professor in the Department of English at York University in Toronto and taught literature and creative writing.

In 2007, her book of poetry Ontological Necessities was shortlisted for the Griffin Poetry Prize. Uppal's poetry collection Pretending to Die (2001) was shortlisted for the ReLit Award, and her memoir Projection: Encounters with My Runaway Mother was shortlisted for the Hilary Weston Writers' Trust Prize for Nonfiction in 2013. She served as the first poet-in-residence for the Rogers Cup Tennis Tournament in 2011. She was also the Olympic poet-in-residence at the 2010 Vancouver Winter Games and the 2012 London Summer Olympics. As a result of her role as the poet-in-residence for the London Summer Olympics, she was dubbed "Canada's coolest poet" by Time Out London magazine. Uppal also became a Fellow of the Royal Society of Canada in 2016.

Uppal died of synovial sarcoma on September 5, 2018 after being diagnosed with the disease three years prior.

== Awards and honours ==
Uppal became a Fellow of the Royal Society of Canada in 2016.

Awards for Uppal's writing
Year	Title	Award	Result	Ref.
2001	Pretending to Die	ReLit Award	Shortlist	
2007	Ontological Necessities	Griffin Poetry Prize	Shortlist	
2013	Projection	Governor General's Award for English-language non-fiction	Shortlist	
2013	Projection	Hilary Weston Writers' Trust Prize for Nonfiction	Shortlist	

== Bibliography ==
=== Poetry ===
- How to Draw Blood From a Stone, Exile Editions, Ltd. 1998. ISBN 978-1-55096-230-7.
- Confessions of a Fertility Expert, Exile Editions, Ltd. 1999. ISBN 978-1-55096-550-6.
- Pretending to Die, Exile Editions, Ltd. 2001. ISBN 978-1-55096-519-3.
- Live Coverage, Exile Editions, Ltd. 2003. ISBN 978-1-55096-571-1.
- Cover Before Striking, Lyricalmyrical Press, 2004, ISBN 978-0-9736588-4-2
- Holocaust Dream, MacLaren Arts Centre, 2005, ISBN 978-0-9693555-9-5 (photographs by Daniel Ehrenworth)
- Ontological Necessities, Exile Editions, Ltd. 2003. ISBN 978-1-55096-045-7.
- Traumatology, Exile Editions, 2010, ISBN 978-1-55096-139-3
- Winter Sport: Poems, Mansfield Press, 2010, ISBN 978-1-894469-49-4
- Successful Tragedies, Bloodaxe Books, 2010, ISBN 978-1-85224-860-4

=== Fiction ===
- The Divine Economy of Salvation, Algonquin Books of Chapel Hill, 2002, ISBN 978-1-56512-365-6; Doubleday Canada, 2003, ISBN 978-0-385-65805-8
- To Whom It May Concern, Doubleday Canada, 2009, ISBN 978-0-385-65993-2
- Cover Before Striking, Dundurn Press, 2015, ISBN 978-1-459-72952-0

=== Non-fiction ===
- We Are What We Mourn, McGill–Queen's University Press, 2009. ISBN 978-0-7735-3456-8
- Projection, Dundurn Press, 2013, ISBN 978-1-77102-274-3

=== Anthologies (as editor) ===
- The Exile Book of Canadian Sports Stories, Exile Editions, 2010, ISBN 978-1-55096-125-6
- The Exile Book of Poetry in Translation: Twenty Canadian Poets Take on the World, Exile Editions, 2009, ISBN 978-1-55096-122-5
- Barry Callaghan: Essays on his Works, Guernica, 2007, ISBN 978-1-55071-253-7
- Uncommon Ground: A Celebration of Matt Cohen – 2002 (edited with Graeme Gibson, Wayne Grady, and Dennis Lee)
- Red Silk: An Anthology of South Asian Canadian Women Poets, Mansfield Press, 2004, ISBN 978-1-894469-16-6 (edited with Rishma Dunlop)

=== Anthologies (as contributor) ===
- Alphabet City 11: Trash
- Body Language: A Head to Toe Anthology
- Certain Things About My Mother: Daughters Speak
- In the Dark: Stories from the Supernatural
- Larger Than Life
- Mentor's Canon: poems about / for / after writers
- New Canadian Poetry
- Writer's Gym

=== Plays ===
- What Linda Said
- 6 Essential Questions
