= An Inheritance of Ashes =

2015 young adult novel by Nova Ren Suma

- First edition cover
- Author: Leah Bobet
- Cover artist: Naomi Chen
- Language: English
- Genre: Young adult fiction
- Published: October 6, 2015
- Publisher: Clarion Books
- Publication place: United States
- ISBN: 9780544281110 Hardcover

An Inheritance of Ashes is a 2015 young adult fantasy novel by Leah Bobet. It was published by Clarion Books.

== Synopsis ==
In the aftermath of the victorious war against the Wicked God Southward, sisters Hallie and Marthe wait for Marthe's husband Thom to return to their farm. As the weeks go by and Thom does not return, Things start to roam the countryside, and Hallie realizes that the Wicked God's defeat may not have been as conclusive as everyone thought.

== Reception ==
Publishers Weekly felt it was "superb," commending Bobet as "an accomplished stylist." Quill & Quire considered it to be an "odd but remarkable story" and "touching yet eerie," describing the setting as "beautiful and barely comprehensible" and Hallie's narration as "reflective (and) poetic." Kirkus Reviews likewise noted that Hallie's narration had "an overabundance of poetic but lofty metaphors and similes," but conceded that the story had a "deep and sobering core."

Black Gate considered it to have "the darkness and intensity of an adult novel," with "masterfully subtle ... writing" and characters who are "full of surprises." Tor.com called it "remarkably good," praising Bobet for balancing "the coming-of-age narrative and the broader story of the world," and lauding her portrayal of complex characters and the relationships between them.

Awards for An Inheritance of Ashes
Year	Award	Result	Ref.
2015	Canadian Library Association Young Adult Book Award	Nominee	
2015	Cybils Award for Young Adult Speculative fiction	Finalist	
2016	Aurora Award for Young Adult Fiction	Winner	
2016	Copper Cylinder Award for Young Adult	Winner	
2016	Sunburst Award for Young Adult Fiction	Winner	
