= Whidden Lectures =

1956 series of lectures at McMaster University

The Whidden Lectures are a lecture series at McMaster University, funded in 1954 by E. Carey Fox. They commemorate Howard P. Whidden, who was Chancellor of the university from 1923 to 1941. They were first given in 1956. Many of the lectures have been published in book form, by Oxford University Press.

- 1956 C. W. de Kiewiet: The Anatomy of South African Misery
- 1957 Vijaya Lakshmi Nehru: The Evolution of India
- 1958 Ronald Syme: Colonial Elites: Rome, Spain and the Americas
- 1959 Charles De Koninck: The Hollow Universe
- 1960 George Norman Clark: Three Aspects of Stuart England
- 1961 William Foxwell Albright: New Horizons in Biblical Research
- 1962 J. Robert Oppenheimer: The Flying Trapeze: Three Crises for Physicists
- 1963 Ian Ramsey: Models and Mystery
- 1964 David Daiches: The Paradox of Scottish Culture: the Eighteenth Century Experience
- 1965 William Arthur Lewis: Politics in West Africa
- 1966 Anthony Blunt: Picasso's 'Guernica'
- 1967 Northrop Frye: The Modern Century
- 1970 Eric Ashby: Masters and Scholars: Reflections on the Rights and Responsibilities of Students
- 1973 Edward Togo Salmon: The Nemesis of Empire
- 1974 Richard Stockton MacNeish
- 1975 Noam Chomsky: Reflections on Language
- 1983 A. J. Ayer: Freedom and Morality
- 1986 John Rupert Martin
- 1988 Tom Stoppard: The Event and the Text
- 1993 Alan James Ryan
- 1997 Elizabeth Loftus: You Must Remember This: Illusions of Memory
- 2000 Bruce Meyer: Canadian Literature and the Western Tradition
- 2001 Steven V. W. Beckwith, Physics and Astronomy, Johns Hopkins University, "Rocket Science and Little Green Men"
- 2002 Cancelled
- 2003 Jean-Daniel Stanley, Deltas Global Change Program, Smithsonian, National Museum of Natural History, Washington, DC, "World Deltas: Archeological and Environmental Perspectives"
- 2005 Donna Haraway, Professor of the History of Consciousness, University of California, Santa Cruz, "We Have Never Been Modern"
- 2006 Brian Massumi, Professor of Communication, Université de Montréal, "The Ideal Streak—Why Visual Representation Always Fails," "Potential Politics and the Primacy of Preemption," and "Affect and Abstraction"
- 2007 Mervyn Morris, Poet and Professor Emeritus of Creative Writing and West Indian Literature, University of the West Indies, "Playing with the Dialect of the Tribe: West Indian Poetry"
- 2008 Mahmood Mamdani, Professor of Government in the Departments of Anthropology and Political Science at Columbia University, "Darfur, Politics, and the War on Terror"
- 2009 Sean B. Carroll, Professor of Molecular Biology and Genetics, University of Wisconsin, "Remarkable Creatures: Epic Adventures in the Search for the Origin of Species" and "Endless Forms Most Beautiful: Evo-Devo and an Expanding Evolutionary Synthesis"
- 2011 Sara Ahmed, Professor of Media and Communications, Goldsmiths, University of London, "On Being Included: On Racism and Diversity in Institutional Life" and "Wilful Subjects: On the Experience of Social Dissent"
- 2012 Ray Jayawardhana, Professor and Canada Research Chair in Observational Astrophysics, University of Toronto, "Rocks, Ice and Penguins: Searching for Clues to Planetary Origins in Antarctica"
- 2013 Jasbir Puar, Department of Women's and Gender Studies, Rutgers University, "Ecologies of Sensation, Sensational Ecologies: Sex and Disability in the Israeli Occupation of Palestine"
- 2014 Joanna Aizenberg, Amy Smith Berylson Professor of Materials Science in the School of Engineering and Applied Science and Professor of Chemistry and Chemical Biology, Harvard University, "Stealing from Nature: Bioinspired Materials of the Future"
- 2016 Amber Miller, Professor of Physics and Dean of Science at Columbia University, "Nature's Ultimate Time Machine: Photographing the Infant Universe", "Cosmological Observations from the Stratosphere"
- 2017 Daphne Brooks, Professor of African American Studies, Theater Studies, and American Studies at Yale University, "The Knowles Sisters' Political Hour: Black Feminist Sonic Dissent at the End of the Third Reconstruction", "If You Should Lose Me": The Archive, the Critic, the Record Shop & the Blues Woman"
- 2018 Joanna Bryson, Associate Professor in the Department of Computing at the University of Bath, "The Good, the Bad, and the Synthetic"
- 2019 Kim TallBear, Canada Research Chair in Indigenous Peoples, Technoscience & Environment, Associate Professor, Faculty of Native Studies, University of Alberta, "Tipi Confessions and the RELAB: Decolonizing Indigenous Sexualities and Research-Creation"

== Notes ==
Whidden Lecture Home Page
