= Riverdale Collegiate Institute =

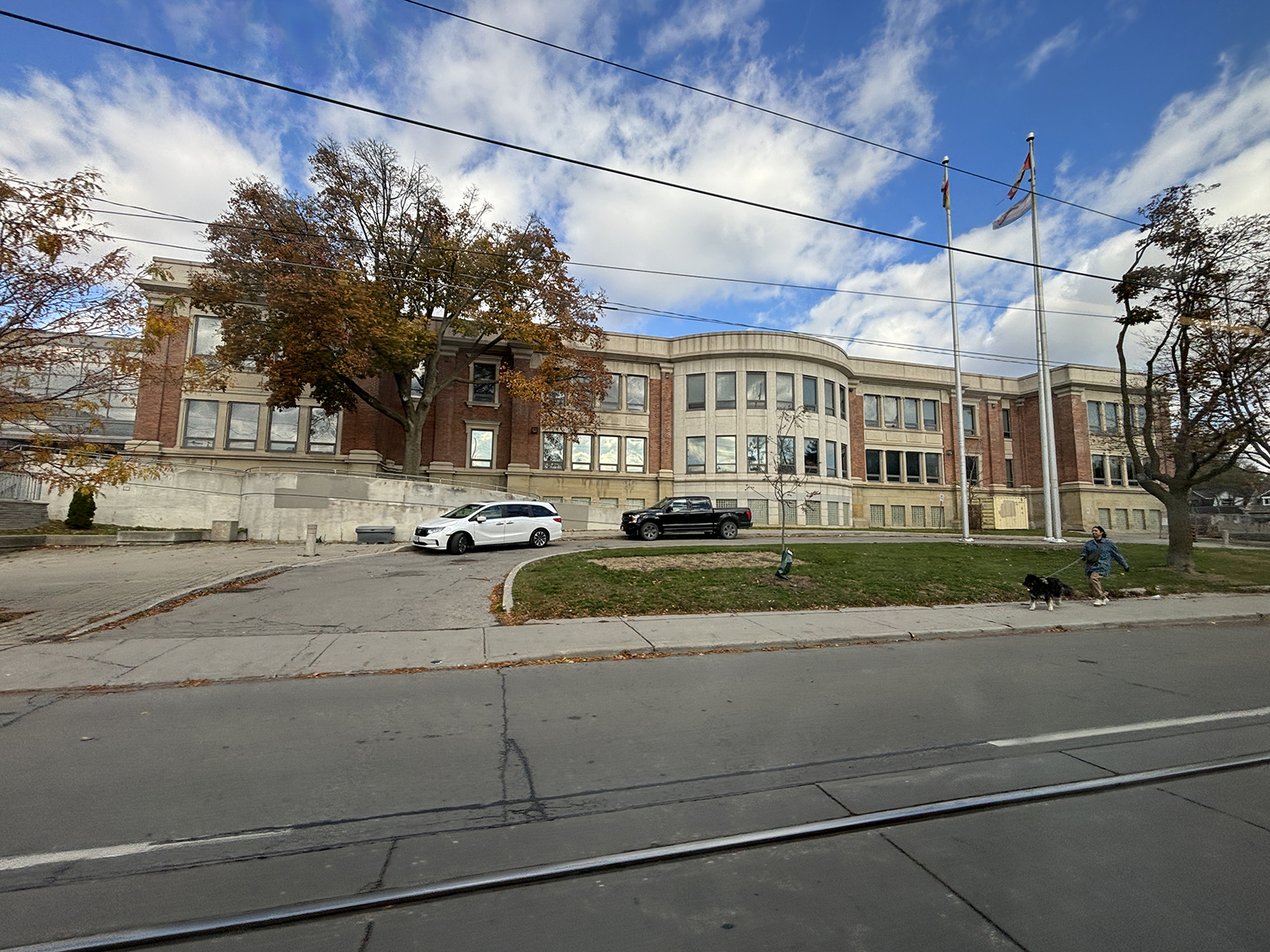

Location
- 1094 Gerrard Street East; Leslieville or Riverdale, Toronto, Ontario, M4M 2A1; Canada; 43.669921°N 79.334856°W

Information
- School type: Public High school
- Motto: Studia Adolescentiam Alunt (Education Nourishes Youth)
- Founded: May 12, 1907; 119 years ago
- School board: Toronto District School Board (Toronto Board of Education)
- Superintendent: Belinda Longe
- Area trustee: Jennifer Story
- School number: 5555 / 939080
- Principal: John Au
- Grades: 9–12
- Enrolment: 2500 (2021)
- Language: English
Colour
- Team name: Riverdale Rams
- Newspaper: The Riverdale Spectator
- Yearbook: The Reveille
- Website: schoolweb.tdsb.on.ca/riverdale

Riverdale Collegiate Institute (Riverdale CI, RCI, or Riverdale) is a semester high school located in Toronto, Ontario, Canada owned and operated by the Toronto Board of Education until its amalgamation in 1998 into the Toronto District School Board.

== History and overview ==
Riverdale Collegiate was founded in 1907. The facility was designed by the architect for the Board of Education, C.E.C. Dyson. In the nineteen-nineties it was extensively renovated but the original facade was maintained.

On May 17, 2006, the first annual United Games were hosted at Riverdale. This was a day-long event also including students from Eastern Commerce, Monarch Park and DCTI. Former NBA player Jerome Williams acted as principal for the day. His activities included a presentation speaking out against violence, barbecuing lunch with students, and overseeing games designed to build relationships between the schools by forming teams with students from all four schools, rather than having a team for each school.

Riverdale provides numerous sports teams and clubs throughout the year. Some big sports include field hockey, swim team, cross country, track and field, volleyball, basketball, soccer, ice hockey, and badminton. There are also many clubs including The Riverdale Athletic Association (RAA), Riverdale Robotics (R3P2), Riverdale Environmental Action League (R.E.A.L), and Students Against Sexual Stereotype Discrimination (SASSD).

Riverdale Collegiate celebrated its centennial on May 12, 2007.

On February 10, 2015, it was reported that the TDSB was launching a review of schools for possible closure. Riverdale Collegiate Institute was incorrectly listed out of a possible seventy schools which the TDSB considers under-used and under review. Riverdale Collegiate Institute was over capacity at 103% at the time of the erroneous news reporting and was included as part of the Pupil Accommodation Review mandated by the Ministry of Education to ensure that "school boards make more efficient use of school space while continuing to ensure that communities have the opportunity to provide meaningful input."

== Notable alumni ==
- Lincoln Alexander – first black Member of Parliament and 24th Lieutenant-Governor of Ontario
- Carl Brewer – NHL defenseman
- Morley Callaghan – writer
- Megan Crewe – young adult writer
- Punch Imlach – Hall of Fame ice hockey coach and general manager
- Michael Ironside – actor
- Tom Pashby – Canadian ophthalmologist, sport safety advocate, and inductee into Canada's Sports Hall of Fame
- Gordon Sinclair – writer and TV personality
- Ron Stewart – Canadian football league player

== See also ==
- Education in Ontario
- List of secondary schools in Ontario
