= Jon Papernick =

American novelist

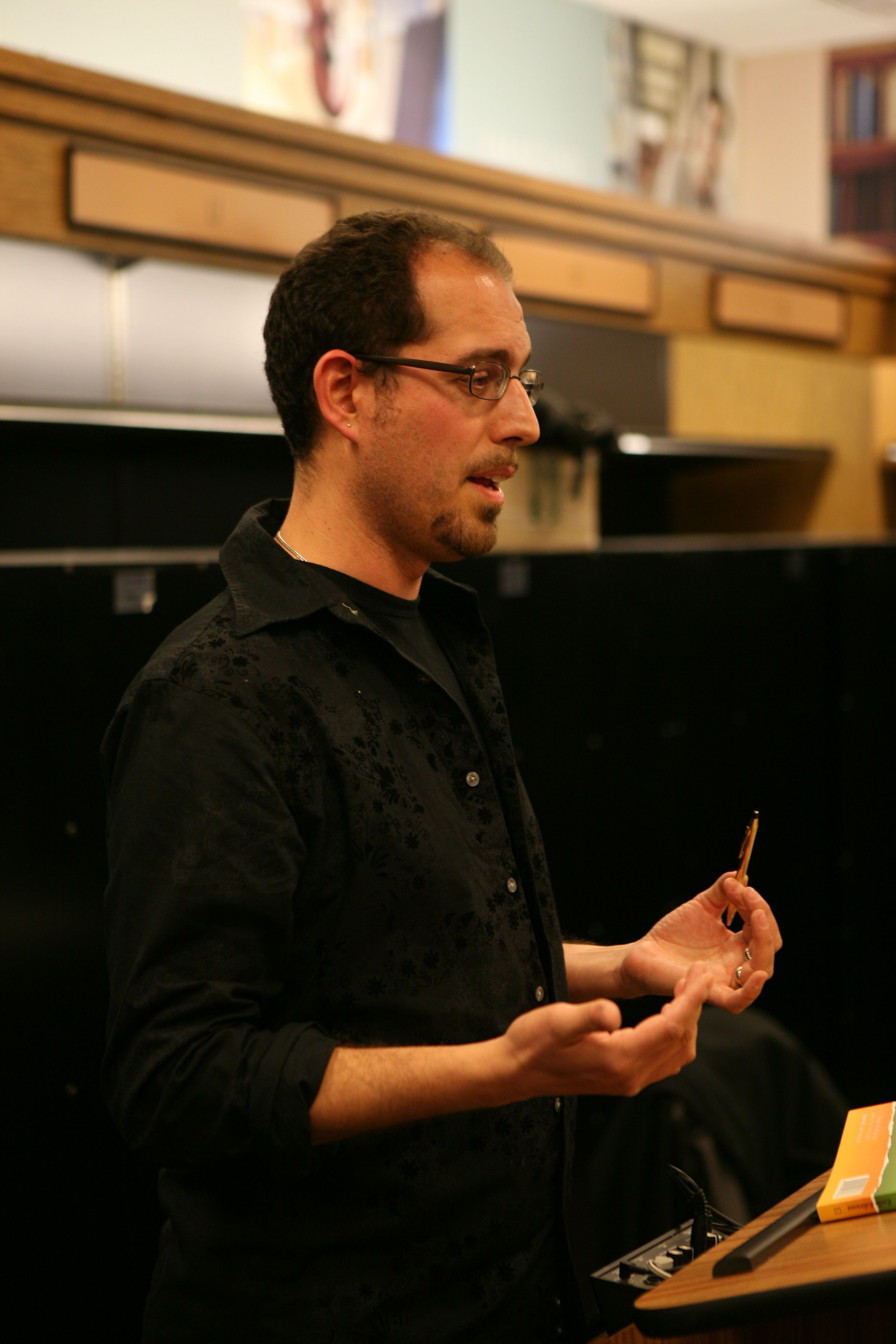
- Born: Jonathan Papernick; 1970 (age 55–56); Toronto, Ontario, Canada
- Occupations: Short story writer; novelist; storyteller
- Website: www.jonpapernick.com

Jonathan "Jon" Papernick (born 1970) is a Canadian-born American short story writer, novelist, and assistant professor at Emerson College.

== Career ==
Papernick (pronounced Paper—pick) was born in Toronto, Ontario. He is the author of The Ascent of Eli Israel, a collection of short stories set in Israel during the collapse of the Oslo Peace Accords, the short story collection There Is No Other, the limited-edition anthology of erotic short fiction XYXX, and the novel The Book of Stone. His work has appeared in the anthologies Lost Tribe: Jewish Fiction From The Edge (2003) and Scribblers on the Roof: Contemporary Jewish Fiction (2006) and numerous literary journals.

In the summer of 2010, Papernick began hand-selling his books via pushcart at farmers' markets in New England and New York as Papernick the Book Peddler. The name is an homage to the classic Yiddish writer Sholem Yankev Abramovich, AKA Mendele Mocher Sforim (Mendele the Book Peddler.) Papernick the Book Peddler's motto is: Bringing Market-Fresh Fiction Directly to the People.

His novel The Book of Stone, was published in 2015. Award-winning author of The World to Come, Dara Horn called The Book of Stone, "Devastating, gripping and beautiful...Open this book carefully. You will close it changed."

Papernick's novel, I Am My Beloveds, a fictional exploration of a couple grappling with the complications of an open marriage, will be published in January 2022. Author Lana Popovic Harper wrote, "I Am My Beloveds is a warm, funny, thoughtful, and often heart-wrenching portrait of a modern couple testing the boundaries of their relationship, while exploring the outer limits of their love for each other. It's an engaging and timely read, perfect for a generation of readers much more open to the allure (and pitfalls) of polyamory."

== Bibliography ==
- The Ascent of Eli Israel. New York: Arcade, 2002 ISBN 1-55970-683-X
- There Is No Other. Toronto: Exile Editions, 2010 ISBN 978-1-55096-138-6
- XYXX. Print-on-Demand, 2013 ISBN 9781939606075
- The Book of Stone. New York: Fig Tree Books, 2015 ISBN 978-1-941493-04-5
- I Am My Beloveds. Story Plant, 2022 ISBN 978-1611883190
