= Mind at the End of Its Tether =

Book by Herbert George Wells

- First edition
- Author: H. G. Wells
- Language: English
- Publisher: Heinemann
- Publication date: 1945
- Pages: 34

Mind at the End of Its Tether (1945) is H. G. Wells' last book — only 34 pages long — which he wrote at the age of 78. In it, Wells considers the idea of humanity being soon replaced by some other, more advanced, species of being. He bases this thought on his long interest in the paleontological record. At the time of writing Wells had not yet heard of the atomic bomb (but had predicted a form of it in his 1914 book The World Set Free).
