= Sunburst Award =

Annual literary award in Canada (2001–2020)

The Sunburst Award for Canadian Literature of the Fantastic is an annual literary award given for a speculative fiction novel or a book-length collection, first awarded in 2001. A young adult category was created in 2008, to differentiate from adult works; and a short fiction award as well. The award was on hiatus between 2020 and 2024 and has returned for the 2025 award.

== History ==
The name of the award comes from the title of the first novel by Phyllis Gotlieb, Sunburst (1964).

The first award was given out in 2001. The award consists of a cash prize (CA$1,000 for novel length work, and CA$500 for short stories) and a medallion. The winner is selected by jury; a new jury is struck each year.

On 2 June 2020, the Sunburst Award Society announced the awards were going on a hiatus due to impacts related to COVID-19.

In December 2024, the return of the award for 2025 was announced. The cash price was changed to CA$3,000 for a novel length work.

== Winners ==
=== General ===
Prior to 2008, the Sunburst Award was presented in a single category. In later years, it was broken down into two or three categories, including adult, young adult, and short story.

After the 2020-2024 hiatus due to the COVID-19 pandemic, the award seems to have returned to a single category.

General Sunburst Award winners
Year	Author	Result	Result	Ref.
2001	Sean Stewart	Galveston	Winner	
2002	Margaret Sweatman	When Alice Lay Down with Peter	Winner	
2003	Nalo Hopkinson	Skin Folk	Winner	
2004	Cory Doctorow	A Place So Foreign and 8 More	Winner	
2005	Geoff Ryman	Air	Winner	
2006	Holly Phillips	In the Palace of Repose	Winner	
2007	Mark Frutkin	Fabrizio's Return	Winner	
2025	Nalo Hopkinson	Blackheart Man	Winner	
2025	Frankie Barnet	Mood Swings	Finalist	
2025	Sydney Hegele	Bird Suit	Finalist	
2025	Canisia Lubrin	Code Noir	Finalist	
2025	Clayton B. Smith	A Seal of Salvage	Finalist	
2026	Helen Marshall	The Lady, The Tiger and the Girl Who Loved Death	Winner	
2026	Hiron Ennes	The Works of Vermin	Finalist	
2026	Mireille Gagné(author); Pablo Strauss(translator)	Horsefly	Finalist	
2026	Amanda Leduc	Wild Life	Finalist	
2026	Mackenzie Nolan	Veal	Finalist	

=== Adult ===
Sunburst Award for Adult Book winners and finalists
Year	Author	Result	Result	Ref.
2008	Nalo Hopkinson	The New Moon's Arms	Winner	
2009	Andrew Davidson	The Gargoyle	Winner	
2009	Jes Battis	Night Child	Finalist	
2009	Dave Duncan	The Alchemist’s Code	Finalist	
2009	Shari Lapena	Things Go Flying	Finalist	
2009	Jo Walton	Half a Crown	Finalist	
2010	A. M. Dellamonica	Indigo Springs	Winner	
2010	Charles de Lint	The Mystery of Grace	Finalist	
2010	Cory Doctorow	Makers	Finalist	
2010	Karl Schroeder	The Sunless Countries	Finalist	
2010	Robert Charles Wilson	Julian Comstock: A Story of 22nd-Century America	Finalist	
2011	Guy Gavriel Kay	Under Heaven	Winner	
2011	Robert J. Sawyer	Watch	Finalist	
2011	Douglas Smith	Chimerascope	Finalist	
2011	S. M. Stirling	Taint in the Blood	Finalist	
2011	Hayden Trenholm	Stealing Home	Finalist	
2012	Geoff Ryman	Paradise Tales	Winner	
2012	K. V. Johansen	Blackdog	Finalist	
2012	David Nickle	Eutopia: A Novel of Terrible Optimism	Finalist	
2012	Ryan Oakley	Technicolor Ultra Mall	Finalist	
2012	Michael Rowe	Enter, Night	Finalist	
2012	Caitlin Sweet	The Pattern Scars	Finalist	
2013	Martine Desjardins (trans. by Fred A. Reed and David Homel)	Maleficium	Winner	
2013	Gerard Collins	Finton Moon	Finalist	
2013	Derryl Murphy	Over the Darkened Landscape	Finalist	
2013	Emily Schultz	The Blondes	Finalist	
2013	Rio Youers	Westlake Soul	Finalist	
2014	Ruth Ozeki	A Tale for the Time Being	Winner	
2015	Thomas King	The Back of the Turtle	Winner	
2015	Nick Cutter	The Troop	Finalist	
2015	Emily St. John Mandel	Station Eleven	Finalist	
2015	Jo Walton	My Real Children	Finalist	
2015	Ian Weir	Will Starling	Finalist	
2016	Gemma Files	Experimental Film	Winner	
2016	Katherine Fawcett	The Little Washer of Sorrows	Finalist	
2016	Silvia Moreno-Garcia	Signal to Noise	Finalist	
2016	Heather O'Neill	Daydreams of Angels	Finalist	
2016	Robert Charles Wilson	The Affinities	Finalist	
2017	Claire Humphrey	Spells of Blood and Kin	Winner	
2017	Ami McKay	The Witches of New York	Finalist	
2017	Sylvain Neuvel	Sleeping Giants	Finalist	
2017	Jo Walton	Necessity	Finalist	
2017	Robert Charles Wilson	Last Year	Finalist	
2018	David Demchuk	The Bone Mother	Winner	
2018	Omar El Akkad	American War	Finalist	
2018	Terri Favro	Sputnik’s Children	Finalist	
2018	Fonda Lee	Jade City	Finalist	
2018	Eden Robinson	Son of a Trickster	Finalist	
2019	Andromeda Romano Lax	Plum Rains	Winner	
2019	Amber Dawn	Sodom Road Exit	Finalist	
2019	Kate Heartfield	Armed in Her Fashion	Finalist	
2019	Rich Larson	Annex	Finalist	
2019	Eden Robinson	Trickster Drift	Finalist	
2020	Silvia Moreno-Garcia	Gods of Jade and Shadow	Winner	
2020	Scott R. Jones	Shout Kill Revel Repeat	Finalist	
2020	Helen Marshall	The Migration	Finalist	
2020	Karen McBride	Crow Winter	Finalist	
2020	Richard Van Camp	Moccasin Square Gardens	Finalist	

=== Short story ===
The Sunburst Award for Short Story was introduced in 2016.

Sunburst Award for Short Story winners and finalists
Year	Author	Result	Result	Ref.
2016	Catherine A. MacLeod	"Hide and Seek" (Playground of Lost Toys)	Winner	
2016	Charlotte Ashley	"La Héron" (F&SF 3-4/15)	Finalist	
2016	Rebecca Campbell	"The Glad Hosts" (Lackington’s #7)	Finalist	
2016	Mike Donoghue	"Stuck in the Past" (Abyss & Apex #54)	Finalist	
2016	Kelly Robson	"Two-Year Man" (Asimov’s, August 2015)	Finalist	
2016	Peter Wendt	"Get the Message" (Second Contacts)	Finalist	
2017	A. C. Wise	"The Sailing of the Henry Charles Morgan in Six Pieces of Scrimshaw (1841)"	Winner	
2017	K. T. Bryski	"La Corriveau" (Strange Horizons 10/3/16)	Finalist	
2017	James Alan Gardner	"The Dog and the Sleepwalker" (Strangers Among Us)	Finalist	
2017	Helen Marshall	"Caro in Carno" (The Mammoth Book of Cthulhu)	Finalist	
2017	A. C. Wise	"The Men from Narrow Houses" (Liminal Stories Spring/Summer ’16)	Finalist	
2018	Sandra Kasturi	"The Beautiful Gears of Dying"	Winner	
2018	Rich Larson	"Spiked" (Abyss & Apex 6/17)	Finalist	
2018	Karin Lowachee	"Meridian" (Where the Stars Rise)	Finalist	
2018	Rati Mehrotra	"Hacker’s Faire" (Cast of Wonders 3/17)	Finalist	
2018	Kate Story	"Animate" (Cli-fi: Canadian Tales of Climate Change)	Finalist	
2019	Senaa Ahmad	"The Glow-in-the-Dark Girls"	Winner	
2019	Madeline Ashby	"Domestic Violence" (Future Tense 3/26/18)	Finalist	
2019	Malon Edwards	"Candied Sweets, Cornbread, and Black-Eyed Peas" (Sword and Sonnet)	Finalist	
2019	Rich Larson	"Meat And Salt And Sparks" (Tor.com 6/6/18)	Finalist	
2019	A. C. Wise	"The Time Traveler’s Husband" (Shimmer 11/18)	Finalist	
2020	Rebecca Campbell	"The Fourth Trimester is the Strangest"	Winner	
2020	Amal El-Mohtar	"Florilegia" (The Mythic Dream)	Finalist	
2020	Kate Heartfield	"The Inland Beacon" (Tesseracts Twenty-Two: Alchemy and Artifacts)	Finalist	
2020	Catherine Kim	"The Hundred Gardens" (Nat. Brut Spring ’19)	Finalist	
2020	Richard Van Camp	"Wheetago War II: Summoners" (Moccasin Square Gardens)	Finalist	

=== Young adult ===
Sunburst Award for Young Adult Book winners and finalists
Year	Author	Result	Result	Ref.
2008	Joanne Proulx	Anthem of a Reluctant Prophet	Winner	
2009	Cory Doctorow	Little Brother	Winner	
2009	Kelley Armstrong	The Summoning	Finalist	
2009	Charles de Lint	Dingo	Finalist	
2009	Eileen Kernaghan	Wild Talent: A Novel of the Supernatural	Finalist	
2009	Max Turner	Night Runner	Finalist	
2010	Hiromi Goto	Half World	Winner	
2010	Megan Crewe	Give Up the Ghost	Finalist	
2010	Maureen Garvie	Amy By Any Other Name	Finalist	
2010	Lesley Livingston	Wondrous Strange	Finalist	
2010	Arthur Slade	The Hunchback Assignment	Finalist	
2011	Paul Glennon	Bookweirder	Winner	
2011	Holly Bennett	Shapeshifter	Finalist	
2011	Erin Bow	Plain Kate	Finalist	
2011	Charles de Lint	The Painted Boy	Finalist	
2011	Robert Paul Weston	Dust City	Finalist	
2012	Catherine Austen	All Good Children	Winner	
2012	R. J. Anderson	Ultraviolet	Finalist	
2012	Jamieson Findlay	The Summer of Permanent Wants	Finalist	
2012	Evan Munday	The Dead Kid Detective Agency	Finalist	
2012	Moira Young	Blood Red Road	Finalist	
2013	Rachel Hartman	Seraphina	Winner	
2013	Michael Bedard	The Green Man	Finalist	
2013	Cory Doctorow	Pirate Cinema	Finalist	
2013	Susan Juby	Bright’s Light	Finalist	
2013	Moira Young	Rebel Heart	Finalist	
2014	Charles de Lint	The Cats of Tanglewood Forest	Winner	
2015	Cecil Castellucci	Tin Star	Winner	
2015	Jonathan Auxier	The Night Gardener	Finalist	
2015	Alyxandra Harvey	A Breath of Frost	Finalist	
2015	Eileen Kernaghan	Sophie, In Shadow	Finalist	
2015	Caitlin Sweet	The Door in the Mountain	Finalist	
2016	Leah Bobet	An Inheritance of Ashes	Winner	
2016	David Carroll	Sight Unseen	Finalist	
2016	Mikaela Everett	The Unquiet	Finalist	
2016	Kenneth Oppel	The Nest	Finalist	
2016	Neil Smith	Boo	Finalist	
2017	Jonathan Auxier	Sophie Quire and the Last Storyguard	Winner	
2017	Lena Coakley	Worlds of Ink and Shadow	Finalist	
2017	Marina Cohen	The Inn Between	Finalist	
2017	Catherine Egan	Julia Vanishes	Finalist	
2017	Ian Donald Keeling	The Skids	Finalist	
2018	Cherie Dimaline	The Marrow Thieves	Winner	
2018	Charis Cotter	The Painting	Finalist	
2018	Fonda Lee	Exo	Finalist	
2018	Kari Maaren	Weave a Circle Round	Finalist	
2018	Wendy Orr	Dragonfly Song	Finalist	
2019	Rachel Hartman	Tess of the Road	Winner	
2019	Sebastien de Castell	Spellslinger	Finalist	
2019	Regan McDonell	Black Chuck	Finalist	
2019	Rebecca Schaeffer	Not Even Bones	Finalist	
2019	Patrick Weekes	Feeder	Finalist	
2020	Allison Mills	The Ghost Collector	Winner	
2020	Nafiza Azad	The Candle and the Flame	Finalist	
2020	Sara Cassidy	Nevers	Finalist	
2020	Aviaq Johnston	Those Who Dwell Below	Finalist	
2020	Jess Keating	Nikki Tesla and the Ferret-Proof Death Ray	Finalist	

== Lists of nominees ==
For a complete and up to date listing of current and past long-listed and short-listed works, please see the Sunburst Award Website.

== Eligibility ==
The Sunburst Award administration and juries use the broadest possible definition of speculative fiction for eligibility purposes: "science fiction, fantasy, magic realism, horror, surrealism, fantastique, fabulism, myth and legend, fantastical storytelling, and any other writing beyond the strictly realistic". To be eligible for the award, a work must be published between 1 January and 31 December of the previous year. Only Canadian citizens and landed immigrants are eligible.
