= Locus Award for Best Editor =

Literary award by the science fiction and fantasy magazine Locus

- Description: Annual award presented by Locus magazine honoring the top book and magazine editors in speculative fiction
- Country: United States
- Presented by: Locus

The Locus Award for Best Editor is one of the annual Locus Awards presented by the science fiction and fantasy magazine Locus. Awards presented in a given year are for works published in the previous calendar year. The award for Best Editor was first presented in 1989. The Locus Awards have been described as a prestigious prize in science fiction, fantasy and horror literature.

== Winners ==
Award winners
Year	Editor	Ref.
1989	Gardner Dozois	
1990	Gardner Dozois	
1991	Gardner Dozois	
1992	Gardner Dozois	
1993	Gardner Dozois	
1994	Gardner Dozois	
1995	Gardner Dozois	
1996	Gardner Dozois	
1997	Gardner Dozois	
1998	Gardner Dozois	
1999	Gardner Dozois	
2000	Gardner Dozois	
2001	Gardner Dozois	
2002	Gardner Dozois	
2003	Gardner Dozois	
2004	Gardner Dozois	
2005	Ellen Datlow	
2006	Ellen Datlow	
2007	Ellen Datlow	
2008	Ellen Datlow	
2009	Ellen Datlow	
2010	Ellen Datlow	
2011	Ellen Datlow	
2012	Ellen Datlow	
2013	Ellen Datlow	
2014	Ellen Datlow	
2015	Ellen Datlow	
2016	David G. Hartwell	
2017	Ellen Datlow	
2018	Ellen Datlow	
2019	Gardner Dozois	
2020	Ellen Datlow	
2021	Ellen Datlow	
2022	Ellen Datlow	
2023	Ellen Datlow	
2024	Neil Clarke	
2025	Neil Clarke	
2026	Neil Clarke	

== See also ==
- Locus Award
