= Exile Editions =

Canadian literary publisher

- Founded: 1976
- Founder: Barry Callaghan
- Country of origin: Canada
- Headquarters location: Toronto
- Key people: Michael Callaghan
- Publication types: Books
- Official website: www.exileeditions.com Exile Quarterly

Exile Editions is an independent literary publisher based in Toronto. It was founded in 1976 by poet, novelist and artist Barry Callaghan, who had previously founded the magazine EXILE Quarterly. It is currently headed by Michael Callaghan. Exile has published over 320 titles to date, including a wide array of poetry, fiction and nonfiction by authors from around the world and Canada such as Yehuda Amichai, Pablo Neruda, Morley Callaghan, Colin Carberry, Austin Clarke, Lauren B. Davis, Gwendolyn MacEwen, Michael Moriarty, Joyce Carol Oates, Jon Papernick, Boris Pasternak, Leon Rooke, Jaime Sabines, Priscilla Uppal, and Sean Virgo.
