= Locus Award =

Speculative fiction literary awards by Locus magazine

- Trophy used since 2018
- Awarded for: The best science fiction, fantasy and horror of the previous year
- Presented by: Locus
- First award: 1971; 55 years ago
- Website: www.sfadb.com/Locus_Awards

The Locus Awards are an annual set of literary awards voted on by readers of the science fiction and fantasy magazine Locus, a monthly magazine based in Oakland, California. The awards are presented at an annual banquet.

Originally a poll of Locus subscribers only, voting is now open to anyone, but the votes of subscribers count twice as much as the votes of non-subscribers. The award was inaugurated in 1971, and was originally intended to provide suggestions and recommendations for the Hugo Awards. They have come to be considered a prestigious prize in science fiction, fantasy and horror literature. The Encyclopedia of Science Fiction regards the Locus Awards as sharing the stature of the Hugo and Nebula Awards.

Gardner Dozois holds the record for the most wins (43), while Neil Gaiman has won the most awards for works of fiction (18). Robert Silverberg has received the highest number of nominations (158).

== Frequently nominated ==
As of the 2021 awards, the following have had the most nominations:

Person	Nominations	Nominations (fiction)	Wins
Robert Silverberg	158	88	9
Gardner Dozois	133	21	43
Ellen Datlow	104	0	16
Michael Swanwick	84	74	3
Ursula K. Le Guin	80	56	24
Martin H. Greenberg	80	0	0
Gene Wolfe	74	67	6
Stephen Baxter	73	67	1
David G. Hartwell	73	0	1
Robert Reed	71	67	0
Lucius Shepard	70	60	8
Gregory Benford	69	54	0
Terri Windling	66	1	0
Frederik Pohl	65	46	3
Nancy Kress	64	57	2
George R. R. Martin	63	42	16

== Categories ==
- Locus Award for Best Novel (1971–1979)
  - Locus Award for Best Science Fiction Novel (1980–)
  - Locus Award for Best Fantasy Novel (1980–)
  - Locus Award for Best Horror Novel (1989–90, 1994, 2017–present)
    - Locus Award for Best Horror/Dark Fantasy Novel (1991–93, 1996–97)
    - Locus Award for Best Dark Fantasy/Horror Novel (1995, 1999)
  - Locus Award for Best First Novel (1981–)
  - Locus Award for Best Young Adult Book (2003–)
  - Locus Award for Best Translated Novel (2026-)
- Locus Award for Best Novella
- Locus Award for Best Novelette
- Locus Award for Best Short Story
- Locus Award for Best Magazine
- Locus Award for Best Publisher
- Locus Award for Best Anthology (1976-)
- Locus Award for Best Collection (1975-)
- Locus Award for Best Editor (1989-)
- Locus Award for Best Artist
- Locus Award for Best Non-fiction (1979-, briefly merged with Art Book in 2004, 2009–2010)
- Locus Award for Best Illustrated and Art Book (1979-1980, 1994-, merged with Non-Fiction in 2004, 2009–2010)

In addition to the regular categories, there have been Special Awards:

- 2018: Clarion West
- 2022: The Codex Writers' Group
- 2023: Carl Brandon Society
- 2024: Jeanne Cavelos (and the Odyssey Writing Workshop)
- 2025: Ignyte Awards
- 2026: The Submission Grinder, David Steffen & Volunteers

== Inactive categories ==
There are several categories that no longer receive Locus Awards:

- Locus Award for Best Original Anthology (1972–1975)
  - 1972: Universe 1 edited by Terry Carr
  - 1973: Again, Dangerous Visions edited by Harlan Ellison
  - 1974: Astounding: John W. Campbell Memorial Anthology edited by Harry Harrison
  - 1975: Universe 4 edited by Terry Carr
- Locus Award for Best Reprint Anthology/Collection (1972–1975)
  - 1972: World's Best Science Fiction: 1971 edited by Donald A. Wollheim and Terry Carr
  - 1973: The Best Science Fiction of the Year 2 edited by Terry Carr
  - 1974: The Best Science Fiction of the Year 2 edited by Terry Carr
  - 1975: Before the Golden Age edited by Isaac Asimov
- Locus Award for Best Fanzine (1971–1977)
  - 1971: Locus
  - 1972: Locus
  - 1973: Locus
  - 1974: Locus
  - 1975: Outworlds
  - 1976: Locus
  - 1977: Locus
- Locus Award for Best Single Fanzine Issue (1971)
  - 1971: Locus #70
- Locus Award for Best Critic (1974–1977)
  - 1974: Richard E. Geis
  - 1975: P. Schuyler Miller
  - 1976: Richard E. Geis
  - 1977: Spider Robinson
- Locus Award for Best Fan Writer (1971–1973)
  - 1971: Harry Warner Jr.
  - 1972: Charles N. Brown
  - 1973: Terry Carr
- Locus Award for Best Fan Critic (1971)
  - 1971: Ted Pauls
- Locus Award for Best Publisher - Hardcover (1975–1976)
  - 1975: Science Fiction Book Club
  - 1976: Science Fiction Book Club
- Locus Award for Best Publisher - Paperback (1975–1976)
  - 1975: Ballantine Books
  - 1976: Ballantine Books
- Locus Award for Best Paperback Cover Artist (1971–1973)
  - 1971: Leo and Diane Dillon
  - 1972: Gene Szafran
  - 1973: Frank Kelly Freas
- Locus Award for Best Magazine Artist (1972–1973)
  - 1972: Frank Kelly Freas
  - 1973: Frank Kelly Freas
- Locus Award for Best Fan Artist (1971–1975)
  - 1971: Alicia Austin
  - 1972: Bill Rotsler
  - 1973: Bill Rotsler
  - 1974: Tim Kirk
  - 1975: Tim Kirk
- Locus Award for Best Fan Cartoonist (1971)
  - 1971: Bill Rotsler
- Locus Award for Best Convention (1971)
  - 1971: Noreascon

== See also ==
- Big Heart Award – award for supporting SF fandom
- BSFA Award – British science fiction awards
- List of science fiction awards
- Hugo Award – annual award for science fiction or fantasy
- Nebula Award – literature prize for science fiction and fantasy works from the United States
