= Karl Schroeder bibliography =

List of works by or about Karl Schroeder, Canadian author.

== Novels ==
- Nickle, David; Karl Schroeder (1997). The Claus Effect. Edmonton: Tesseract Books.
- Schroeder, Karl (2000). Ventus. New York: Tor. ISBN 9780765303714.
- — (2002). Permanence. New York: Tor. ISBN 9780765303714.
- --- (2015). Lady of Mazes. New York: Tor. ISBN 978-0-7653-5078-7
- Crisis in Zefra (Directorate of Land Strategic Concepts, National Defence Canada; 2005.) ISBN 978-0-662-40643-3
- — (2014). Lockstep. New York: Tor. ISBN 9780765337269.
- --- (2018). The Million. New York: Tor.com. ISBN 9781250185426
- --- (2019). Stealing Worlds. New York: Tor. ISBN 9780765399984.

The Virga series

- Sun of Suns (Tor Books, 2006.) ISBN 978-0765354532
- Queen of Candesce (Tor Books, 2007.) ISBN 978-0765315441
- Pirate Sun (Tor Books, 2008.) ISBN 978-0765315458
- The Sunless Countries (Tor Books, 2009.) ISBN 978-0765320766
- Ashes of Candesce (Tor Books, 2012.) ISBN 978-0765324924

== Short fiction ==
Stories

Title	Year	First published	Reprinted/collected	Notes
Lockstep : part I of IV	2013	Schroeder, Karl (December 2013). "Lockstep : years hidden in a night : part I of IV". Analog Science Fiction and Fact. 133 (12): 8–48.		Serial, later published as: Schroeder, Karl (2014). Lockstep. Tor.
Lockstep : part II of IV	2014	Schroeder, Karl (January–February 2014). "Lockstep : part II of IV". Analog Science Fiction and Fact. 134 (1–2): 132–178.		Serial, later published as: Schroeder, Karl (2014). Lockstep. Tor.
Lockstep : part IV of IV	2014	Schroeder, Karl (April 2014). "Lockstep, conclusion". Analog Science Fiction and Fact. 134 (4): 64–103.		Serial, later published as: Schroeder, Karl (2014). Lockstep. Tor.

- "The Great Worm". (Pierian Spring, Fall 1983.)
- "The Pools of Air". (Tesseracts 3 anthology, Press Porcepic, 1991.) ISBN 978-0-88878-290-8
- "Hopscotch". (On Spec magazine, summer 1992.)
- "The Toy Mill" (with David Nickle). (Tesseracts 4 anthology, Beach Holme Press, 1992.) ISBN 978-0-88878-322-6
- "Solitaire". (Figment magazine; Fall/Winter 1992.)
- "The Cold Convergence". (Figment magazine, spring 1993.)
- "Making Ghosts". (On Spec, Hard SF Issue, spring 1994.)
- "The Engine of Recall". (Aboriginal SF, Winter 1997.)
- "Ball of Blood". (Horrors! 365 Scary Stories anthology, Barnes and Noble, 1997). ISBN 978-0-7607-0141-6
- "Halo". (Tesseracts 5 anthology, Tesseract Books, 1996.) ISBN 978-1-895836-26-4
- "Dawn". (Tesseracts 7 anthology, Tesseract Books, 1999.) ISBN 978-1-895836-58-5
- "The Dragon of Pripyat" [Gennady Malianov series]. (Tesseracts 8 anthology, Tesseract Books, 1999.) ISBN 978-1-895836-61-5
- "Allegiances". (The Touch: Epidemic of the Millennium. iBooks, 2000.)
- "Alexander's Road" [Gennady Malianov series] (2005)
- "The Engine of Recall" (collection) (Red Deer Press, 2005.) ISBN 978-0-88995-345-1
- "Book, Theatre, and Wheel". (Solaris Book of New SF #2, Solaris, 2008.)
- "To Hie from Far Cilenia" [Gennady Malianov series]. 2008; Metatropolis, Tor, 2010 ISBN 978-0-7653-2710-9
- "Mitigation". (Fast Forward #2, Pyr Books, 2009.)
- "Deodand". [Gennady Malianov series] 2010
- "Laika's Ghost" [Gennady Malianov series] (Engineering Infinity, edited by Jonathan Strahan, December 2010)
- "Jubilee" (Tor.com, 2014)
- "Kheldyu" [Gennady Malianov series] (Reach for Infinity, edited by Jonathan Strahan, May 2014)
- "Noon in the Antilibrary" (MIT Technology Review, 2018)

In 2026, the Gennady Malianov stories were collected in Schroeder's book titled Laika's Ghost.

== Non-fiction ==
- Merry Christmas, You Ungrateful Bastards. (On Spec Summer 1993.)
- Warm Fuzziness: Quantum Mechanics and the New Age. (Transforum, August 1993.)
- Worldbuilding (SF Canada, Spring 1999.)
- The Complete Idiot's Guide to Publishing Science Fiction (with Cory Doctorow). (MacMillan, 2000.) ISBN 978-0-02-863918-5
- Traitor to Both Sides. (The New York Review of Science Fiction, April 2005.)
- Schroeder, Karl (May 2014). "Lockstep : a possible galactic empire". Science Fact. Analog Science Fiction and Fact. 134 (5): 22–27.

== Critical studies and reviews of Schroeder's work ==
- Lovett, Richard A. (May 2014). "Karl Schroeder". Biolog. Analog Science Fiction and Fact. 134 (5): 28.
