= Lockstep (disambiguation) =

Lockstep is a kind of marching that involves all marcher's legs moving in the same way at the same time.

Lockstep or lock step may also refer to:

- Lockstep (computing), a term used in fault-tolerant computing
- Lockstep protocol, a protocol that tackles the look-ahead cheating problem in peer-to-peer gaming networks
- Lockstep compensation, a form of employee compensation based purely on seniority
- Lock step (dance move), dance steps which involve the "locking" of the moving foot
- Lockstep (novel), a science fiction book written by Karl Schroeder
- "Lockstep" (The Night Agent), a 2026 television episode
