= Aurora Award for Best YA Novel =

English-language literary awards

The Aurora Awards are English-language literary awards granted annually by the Canadian SF and Fantasy Association and SFSF Boreal Inc. The Award for Best YA Novel was first awarded in 2013 as a separate category to the Best Novel category. Currently, the award has only been split for the English-language Award, and French YA novels would only be eligible for the Meilleur roman.

Charles de Lint and Fonda Lee have won the award the most number of times at twice each.

== Winners and nominees ==
Year	Author(s)	Work	Publisher/Publication	Result	Ref.
2013	Charles de Lint	Under My Skin	Razorbill	Winner	
2013	Leah Bobet	Above	Levine	Finalist	
2013	Kelley Armstrong	The Calling	HarperTeen	Finalist	
2013	Neil Godbout	Dissolve	Bundoran	Finalist	
2013	Michell Plested	Mich Murdoch, Teen Superhero	Five Rivers	Finalist	
2013	Cory Doctorow	Pirate Cinema	Tor Teen	Finalist	
2014	Kelley Armstrong	The Rising	HarperTeen	Winner	
2014	Marty Chan	Demon Gate	Fitzhenry & Whiteside	Finalist	
2014	Amanda Sun	Ink	Harlequin Teen	Finalist	
2014	S. M. Beiko	The Lake and the Library	ECW	Finalist	
2014	D. G. Ladroute	Out of Time	Five Rivers	Finalist	
2014	Neil Godbout	Resolve	Bundoran	Finalist	
2015	Karl Schroeder	Lockstep	Tor	Winner	
2015	Charles de Lint	Out of this World	Razorbill	Winner	
2015	Sherry Peters	Mabel the Lovelorn Dwarf	Dwarvenamazon	Finalist	
2015	Amanda Sun	Rain	Harlequin Teen	Finalist	
2015	Kelley Armstrong	Sea of Shadows	Doubleday	Finalist	
2015	Edward Willett	Twist of the Blade	Coteau	Finalist	
2015	Charlene Challenger	The Voices in Between	Tightrope	Finalist	
2016	Leah Bobet	An Inheritance of Ashes	Scholastic	Winner	
2016	Caitlin Sweet	The Flame in the Maze	ChiZine	Finalist	
2016	Suzy Vadori	The Fountain	Evil Alter Ego	Finalist	
2016	Sherry Peters	Mabel the Mafioso Dwarf	Dwarvenamazon	Finalist	
2016	Jayne Barnard	Maddie Hatter and the Deadly Diamond	Tyche	Finalist	
2017	James Bow	Icarus Down	Scholastic	Winner	
2017	Randy McCharles	Day of the Demon	CreateSpace	Finalist	
2017	Edward Willett	Door into Faerie	Coteau	Finalist	
2017	Michell Plested	Mik Murdoch: Crisis of Conscience	Evil Alter Ego	Finalist	
2017	Adam Dreece	The Wizard Killer	ADZO	Finalist	
2018	Fonda Lee	Exo	Scholastic	Winner	
2018	Elizabeth Whitton	Houses of the Old Blood	Kettlescon	Winner	
2018	Jayne Barnard	Maddie Hatter and the Gilded Gauge	Tyche	Finalist	
2018	S. M. Beiko	Scion of the Fox	ECW	Finalist	
2018	Suzy Vadori	The West Woods	Evil Alter Ego	Finalist	
2019	Fonda Lee	Cross Fire	Scholastic	Winner	
2019	S. M. Beiko	Children of the Bloodlands	ECW	Finalist	
2019	Clare C. Marshall	The Emerald Cloth	Faery Ink	Finalist	
2019	Nathan Burgoine	Exit Plan for Teenage Freaks	Bold Strokes	Finalist	
2019	J. M. Dover	Finding Atlantis	Evil Alter Ego	Finalist	
2019	Sarah Raughley	Legacy of Light	Simon Pulse	Finalist	
2019	Éric Desmarais	The Sign of Faust	Renaissance	Finalist	
2019	Alison Lohans	Timefall	Five Rivers	Finalist	
2020	Susan Forest	Bursts of Fire	Laksa	Winner	
2020	S. M. Beiko	The Brilliant Dark	ECW	Finalist	
2020	Marty Chan	Metamorphosis	Fitzhenry & Whiteside	Finalist	
2020	M. J. Lyons	Murder at the World's Fair	Renaissance	Finalist	
2020	Kelley Armstrong	Wolf's Bane	KLA Fricke	Finalist	
2021	Susan Forest	Flights of Marigold	Laksa	Winner	
2021	Kelley Armstrong	The Gryphon's Lair	Puffin Canada	Finalist	
2021	Rhonda Parrish	Hollow	Tyche	Finalist	
2021	J. M. Dover	Return to Atlantis	Evil Alter Ego	Finalist	
2021	Suzy Vadori	Wall of Wishes	Old Vines	Finalist	
2022	Wab Kinew	Walking in Two Worlds	Penguin Teen	Winner	
2022	Elizabeth Whitton	The Gold Flame of Senica	Kettlescon	Finalist	
2022	Xiran Jay Zhao	Iron Widow	Penguin Teen	Finalist	
2022	Kelley Armstrong	The Serpent's Fury	Puffin Canada	Finalist	
2022	Edward Willett	Star Song	Shadowpaw	Finalist	
2023	Douglas Smith	The Hollow Boys	Spiral Path	Winner	
2023	Ann Birdgenaw	Black Hole Radio (Ka'Azula : 3)	DartFrog	Finalist	
2023	Kenneth Oppel	Ghostlight	Puffin Canada	Finalist	
2023	Rati Mehrotra	Night of the Raven, Dawn of the Dove	Wednesday Books	Finalist	
2023	Xiran Jay Zhao	Zachary Ying and the Dragon Emperor	Margaret K. McElderry	Finalist	
2024	Cherie Dimaline	Funeral Songs for Dying Girls	Tundra Books	Winner	
2024	Douglas Smith	The Crystal Key	Spiral Path	Finalist	
2024	Rati Mehrotra	Flower and Thorn	Wednesday Books	Finalist	
2024	Naben Ruthnum	The Grimmer	ECW	Finalist	
2024	S. M. Beiko	The Stars of Mount Quixx	ECW	Finalist	
2025	Xiran Jay Zhao	Heavenly Tyrant	Tundra Books	Winner	
2025	S. M. Beiko	The Door in Lake Mallion	ECW	Finalist	
2025	C.L. Carey	Spaced!	Renaissance	Finalist	
2025	Douglas Smith	The Lost Expedition	Spiral Path	Finalist	
2025	Melissa Yue	Misadventures in Ghosthunting	Harper Collins	Finalist	
2026	Shannon Lee	Breath of the Dragon	Wednesday Books	Winner	
2026	Fonda Lee	Breath of the Dragon	Wednesday Books	Winner	
2026	Edward Willett	Fireboy	Shadowpaw Press	Finalist	
2026	D.M. De Alwis	A Lion's Head	Ahasae Tharu Publications	Finalist	
2026	Jamieson Wolf	Minotaur	Rebel Satori Press	Finalist	
2026	Avi Silver	One Morning Sun	Molewhale Press	Finalist	
2026	Jen Desmarais	Winging It	Renaissance Press	Finalist	
