= Ventus =

Ventus may refer to:

- Ventus (god) one of the Venti, Roman wind deities
- Ventus (Kingdom Hearts), video game character in the Kingdom Hearts series
- Ventus (novel), a science fiction novel by Karl Schroeder
- Ventus (airplane), marque of Schempp-Hirth sailplanes, for Ventus or Ventus-2 gliders
- Ventus (wireless company)
- Ventus (gaming company)
- Ventus, 8th on list of tallest buildings in İzmir
