= Kathleen Ann Goonan =

American writer (1952–2021)

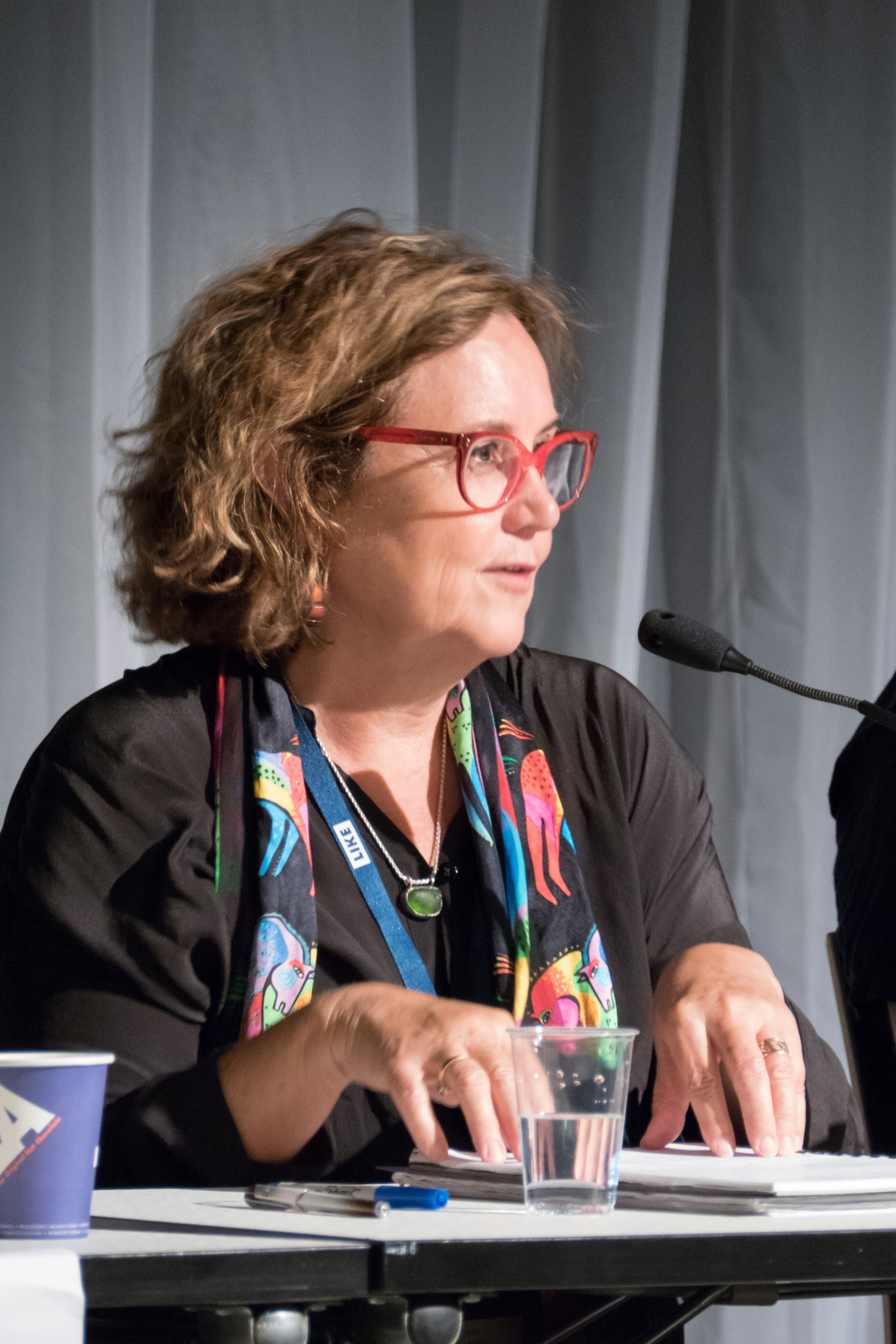
- Goonan at the World Science Fiction Convention in Helsinki, 2017
- Born: May 14, 1952; Cincinnati, Ohio, U.S.
- Died: January 28, 2021 (aged 68)
- Writing career
- Years active: 1994–2011
- Genre: Science fiction
- Notable works: Queen City Jazz; In War Times

Kathleen Ann Goonan (May 14, 1952 – January 28, 2021) was an American science fiction writer. Several of her books have been nominated for the Nebula Award. Her debut novel Queen City Jazz was a New York Times Notable Book of the Year, and her novel In War Times was chosen by the American Library Association as Best Science Fiction Novel for their 2008 reading list. In July 2008, In War Times won the John W. Campbell Memorial Award for Best Science Fiction Novel. Her novel This Shared Dream was released in July 2011 by Tor Books.

== Personal life ==
Goonan was born in Cincinnati, Ohio, the setting of her first novel, and at age eight moved to Hawaii, the setting for her second novel, while her father worked for the Navy for two years. In her last years, she divided her time between the Smoky Mountains in Tennessee and the Florida Keys with her husband, Joseph Mansy, whom she married in 1977.

She earned a degree in English literature and philosophy from Virginia Polytechnic Institute, and, following graduation, received an Association Montessori Internationale teaching certification from the Montessori Institute in Washington, D.C. She then opened a Montessori school in Knoxville. Following a later move to Hawaii, she became a full-time writer. She was a professor of the Practice of Creative Writing and Science Fiction at the Georgia Institute of Technology.

On January 28, 2021, Goonan died from bone cancer.

== Fiction ==
Goonan is best known for novels which give snapshots taken at different times of a world where nano- and biotechnologies ("bionan") produce deep changes in humans and their habitat. She explored themes of cultural and social change and catastrophe. She was a great lover of jazz and music in general, and peppered her tales with references to (and reincarnations of) the likes of Duke Ellington, Charlie Parker, and Sun Ra.

Goonan's first novel, Queen City Jazz (Tor), was published in 1994 to critical acclaim including from cyberpunk SF writer William Gibson who described it as "An unforgettable vision of America transfigured by a new and utterly apocalyptic technology." It was a New York Times Notable Book for 1994 and a finalist in 1998 for the British Science Fiction Association Award. It became the first book in what she would later call her Nanotech Quartet. Because of Gibson's praise, her work has sometimes been grouped with cyberpunk. However, she deals little with computers in her novels, and her characters, such as Verity, the protagonist of Queen City Jazz, are positive and sometimes heroic, while cyberpunk concerns itself with anti-heroes. This has led to some SF critics dubbing a new subgenre 'nanopunk'.

While her second novel, 1996's The Bones of Time (Tor), featured some elements of nanotechnology science within it, it is not part of the Quartet, and was not centered on these ideas. Instead, it mixes Hawaiian mythology with a spy thriller-type chase through Asia centered on the cloning of one of Hawaii's native rulers. This novel was an Arthur C Clarke Award finalist.

Mississippi Blues (Tor) followed in 1997 as a direct sequel to Queen City Jazz, following the further adventures of her main character Verity along a Mississippi River radically changed by malfunctioning nanotech. It is somewhat of a tribute to the great American author Mark Twain, who appears in the book as two separate characters who have been programmed with nanotech into believing they are him. This novel won the Hall of Fame Darrel Award in conjunction with her short story "The Bride of Elvis" for their contribution to speculative fiction set in the Mid-South of America.

Crescent City Rhapsody (HarperCollins) was published in 2000 as a prequel, explaining how the world of Queen City Jazz came about as the U.S. government conspired to introduce nanotechnology that was not tested for possible side effects. It was a finalist for the Nebula Award, and received high praise from her peers including such genre authors as Joe Haldeman, Greg Bear, Gregory Benford, and Stephen R. Donaldson. Much of the novel takes place in New Orleans, and was written five years before Hurricane Katrina struck.

Light Music, published in 2002 (HarperCollins), concludes the Nanotech Quartet. This novel looks at the further evolution of humanity under the influence of "bionan", and ties it in with an alien presence apparently responsible for "El Silencio", the great radio silence of Crescent City Rhapsody that paved the way for the nanotech takeover. Light Music received a starred review in Booklist and was also reviewed in the New York Times. Once more, other science fiction authors spoke highly of her work including Kim Stanley Robinson, David Brin, and, again, William Gibson.

In War Times, published in 2007 (Tor), is set in World War II. This novel represents a major departure from her nanotech novels, mixing elements of historical fiction with the alternate history subgenre of science fiction. There is no mention of nanotech in the book, though it does deal with other technology both real and theoretical throughout the novel. In War Times is centered on secret technologies used during the war and extrapolates on what might have happened if some of those had surpassed atomic tech and created a lasting peace instead of a Cold War. Without ever using the specific term, Goonan clearly considers the concept of the multiverse first postulated by American philosopher and psychologist William James in 1895 and now a serious theory within physics. This novel was chosen by the American Library Association as Best Science Fiction Novel for their 2008 reading list. It also was the winner of the 2008 John W. Campbell Memorial Award.

Goonan's novelette "Creatures with Wings" appeared in the 2010 anthology Engineering Infinity, edited by Jonathan Strahan. Her novelette "Wilder Still, the Stars" was published in Strahan's 2014 anthology Reach for Infinity.

Goonan's newest novel, This Shared Dream, published in 2011, continues the story from In War Times. The three Dance children are now adults and coping with being seemingly abandoned by their parents. All three are disturbed by memories of a reality that existed in place of their world. Jill, the eldest daughter, even remembers the disappearance of their mother while preventing the assassination of John F. Kennedy. Key characters from In War Times make appearances in This Shared Dream while trying to thwart the machinations of an unseen enemy bent on using the Hadntz Device to alter history for their ends. This Shared Dream received a glowing review by Michael Dirda of The Washington Post.

== Bibliography ==
=== Novels ===
- The Bones of Time
- In War Times
- This Shared Dream

Nanotech Quartet

1. Queen City Jazz
2. Mississippi Blues
3. Crescent City Rhapsody
4. Light Music

=== Non-fiction ===
- Science Fiction and All That Jazz
- The Biological Century and the Future of Science Fiction
- Consciousness and Literature: A writer's view
- "Teaching science fiction, or Where do we come from? What are we? Wher are we going?". Guest Editorial. Asimov's Science Fiction. 39 (6): 4–5. June 2015.

== See also ==
- Nanopunk
- Posthuman
