= Christopher Rowe =

Christopher Rowe may refer to:

- Christopher Rowe (classicist) (1944–2025), British classical scholar
- Christopher Rowe (author) (born 1969), American author
- Christopher Rowe (record producer), American record producer
