= Aurealis Award for Best Anthology =

Literary award category

- Awarded for: Excellence in speculative fiction anthologies
- Country: Australia
- Presented by: Chimaera Publications, Continuum Foundation
- First award: 2008
- Currently held by: Aiki Flinthart
- Website: Official site

The Aurealis Awards are presented annually by the Australia-based Chimaera Publications and WASFF to published works in order to "recognise the achievements of Australian science fiction, fantasy, horror writers". To qualify, a work must have been first published by an Australian citizen or permanent resident between 1 January and 31 December of the corresponding year; the presentation ceremony is held the following year. It has grown from a small function of around 20 people to a two-day event attended by over 200 people.

Since their creation in 1995, awards have been given in various categories of speculative fiction. Categories currently include science fiction, fantasy, horror, speculative young adult fiction—with separate awards for novels and short fiction—collections, anthologies, illustrative works or graphic novels, children's fiction told primarily through words, children's fiction told primarily through pictures, and an award for excellence in speculative fiction. The awards have attracted the attention of publishers by setting down a benchmark in science fiction and fantasy. The continued sponsorship by publishers such as HarperCollins and Orbit has identified the award as an honour to be taken seriously.

The results are decided by a panel of judges from a list of submitted nominees; the long-list of nominees is reduced to a short-list of finalists. The judges are selected from a public application process by the Award's management team.

This article lists all the short-list nominees and winners in the best anthology category. The award for best anthology was first awarded in 2008 along with two other categories: best collection and best illustrated book or graphic novel. These replaced the discontinued Golden Aurealis Awards. Jonathan Strahan has since won the award seven times (7), while Alisa Krasnostein and Julia Rios have won it twice (2). Strahan holds the record for most nominations, having received 24 nominations. This is as of the 2021 awards, in which the winners were announced in late May 2022.

== Winners and nominees ==
In the following table, the years correspond to the year of the book's eligibility; the ceremonies are always held the following year. Each year links to the corresponding "year in literature" article. Entries with a blue background have won the award; those with a white background are the nominees on the short-list.

* Winners and joint winners
* Nominees on the shortlist

| Year | Editor(s) | Anthology | Publisher | Ref |
|---|---|---|---|---|
| 2008 | Jonathan Strahan* | The Starry Rift | Viking Children’s Books | |
| 2008 | Bill Congreve & Michelle Marquardt | Year's Best Australian Science Fiction and Fantasy, Fourth Annual Volume | MirrorDanse Books | |
| 2008 | Jack Dann | Dreaming Again | HarperVoyager | |
| 2009 | Jonathan Strahan* | Eclipse 3 | Night Shade Books | |
| 2009 | Gardner Dozois & Jonathan Strahan | The New Space Opera 2 | Harper Eos | |
| 2009 | Alisa Krasnostein & Tehani Wessely | New Ceres Nights | Twelfth Planet Press | |
| 2009 | Keith Stevenson | X6 | Coeur de Lion Publishing | |
| 2009 | Jonathan Strahan | Eclipse 2 | Night Shade Books | |
| 2010 | Jonathan Strahan* & Marianne S. Jablon* | Wings of Fire | Night Shade Books | |
| 2010 | Angela Challis & Marty Young | Macabre: A Journey Through Australia's Darkest Fears | Brimstone Press | |
| 2010 | Alisa Krasnostein | Sprawl | Twelfth Planet Press | |
| 2010 | Amanda Pillar & Pete Kempshall | Scenes from the Second Storey | Morrigan Books | |
| 2010 | Jonathan Strahan | Godlike Machines | SF Book Club | |
| 2011 | Jack Dann* & Nick Gevers* | Ghosts by Gaslight | HarperVoyager | |
| 2011 | Liz Grzyb & Talie Helene | The Year's Best Australian Fantasy and Horror 2010 | Ticonderoga Publications | |
| 2011 | Amanda Pillar & K. V. Taylor | Ishtar | Gilgamesh Press | |
| 2011 | Jonathan Strahan | The Best Science Fiction and Fantasy of the Year: Volume 5 | Night Shade Books | |
| 2011 | Jonathan Strahan | Life on Mars | Viking Press | |
| 2012 | Jonathan Strahan* | The Best Science Fiction and Fantasy of the Year: Volume 6 | Night Shade Books | |
| 2012 | Liz Grzyb & Talie Helene | The Year's Best Australian Fantasy and Horror 2011 | Ticonderoga Publications | |
| 2012 | Amanda Pillar | Bloodstones | Ticonderoga Publications | |
| 2012 | Jonathan Strahan | Under My Hat | Random House | |
| 2012 | Jonathan Strahan | Edge of Infinity | Solaris Books | |
| 2013 | Liz Grzyb* & Talie Helene* (tie) | The Year's Best Australian Fantasy and Horror 2012 | Ticonderoga Publications | |
| 2013 | Tehani Wessely* (tie) | One Small Step, An Anthology of Discoveries | FableCroft Publishing | |
| 2013 | Liz Grzyb | Dreaming of Djinn | Ticonderoga Publications | |
| 2013 | Jonathan Strahan | The Best Science Fiction and Fantasy of the Year: Volume 7 | Night Shade Books | |
| 2013 | Tehani Wessely | Focus 2012: Highlights of Australian Short Fiction | FableCroft Publishing | |
| 2014 | Alisa Krasnostein* & Julia Rios* | Kaleidoscope | Twelfth Planet Press | |
| 2014 | Liz Grzyb | Kisses by Clockwork | Ticonderoga Publications | |
| 2014 | Dominica Malcolm | Amok: An Anthology of Asia-Pacific Speculative Fiction | Solarwyrm Press | |
| 2014 | Jonathan Strahan | Reach for Infinity | Solaris Books | |
| 2014 | Jonathan Strahan | Fearsome Magics | Solaris Books | |
| 2014 | Tehani Wessely | Phantazein | FableCroft Publishing | |
| 2015 | Amanda Pillar* | Bloodlines | Ticonderoga Publications | |
| 2015 | Liz Grzyb | Hear Me Roar | Ticonderoga Publications | |
| 2015 | Liz Grzyb and Talie Helene | The Year's Best Australian Fantasy and Horror 2014 | Ticonderoga Publications | |
| 2015 | Jonathan Strahan | Meeting Infinity | Solaris | |
| 2015 | Jonathan Strahan | The Best Science Fiction and Fantasy of the Year: Volume 9 | Ticonderoga Publications | |
| 2015 | Tehani Wessely | Focus 2014: Highlights of Australian Short Fiction | FableCroft Publishing | |
| 2016 | Julia Rios* & Alisa Krasnostein* | Year's Best YA Speculative Fiction | Twelfth Planet Press | |
| 2016 | Jack Dann | Dreaming in the Dark | PS Publishing | |
| 2016 | Tsana Dolichva & Holly Kench | Defying Doomsday | Twelfth Planet Press | |
| 2016 | Jonathan Strahan | The Best Science Fiction and Fantasy of the Year: Volume 10 | Solaris | |
| 2016 | Tehani Wessely | In Your Face | FableCroft Publishing | |
| 2017 | Jonathan Strahan* | Infinity Wars | Solaris | |
| 2017 | Shane Jiraiya Cummings & Anthony Ferguson | Midnight Echo 12 | Australasian Horror Writers Association | |
| 2017 | Liz Grzyb & Talie Helene | The Year's Best Australian Fantasy and Horror 2015 | Ticonderoga Publications | |
| 2017 | Keith Stevenson | Dimension6: Annual Collection 2017 | coeur de lion publishing | |
| 2017 | Jonathan Strahan | The Best Science Fiction and Fantasy of the Year: Volume 11 | Solaris | |
| 2018 | Jonathan Strahan* | The Best Science Fiction and Fantasy of the Year: Volume 12 | Solaris | |
| 2018 | Aidan Doyle, Rachael K. Jones & E. Catherine Tobler | Sword and Sonnet | Ate Bit Bear | |
| 2018 | Russell B. Farr | Aurum | Ticonderoga Publications | |
| 2018 | Rivqa Rafael & Tansy Rayner Roberts | Mother of Invention | Twelfth Planet Press | |
| 2018 | Jonathan Strahan | Infinity's End | Solaris | |
| 2019 | Jonathan Strahan* | Mission: Critical | Solaris Books | |
| 2019 | Michael Earp | Kindred: 12 Queer #LoveOzYA Stories | Walker Books | |
| 2019 | Christopher Sequeira | Sherlock Holmes and Doctor Was Not | IFWG Publishing | |
| 2019 | Jonathan Strahan | The Best Science Fiction and Fantasy of the Year: Volume 13 | Solaris Books | |
| 2020 | Tsana Dolichva* (ed.) | Rebuilding Tomorrow | Twelfth Planet Press | |
| 2020 | Michael Mohammed Ahmad (ed.) | After Australia | Affirm Press | |
| 2020 | Aiki Flinthart and Pamela Jeffs | The Zookeeper's Tales of Interstellar Oddities | CAT Press | |
| 2020 | Alis Franklin and Lyss Wickramasinghe (eds.) | Unnatural Order | CSFG Publishing | |
| 2020 | Lee Murray and Geneve Flynn (eds.) | Black Cranes: Tales of Unquiet Women | Omnium Gatherum | |
| 2020 | Jonathan Strahan (ed.) | Made to Order: Robots and Revolution | Solaris | |
| 2021 | Aiki Flinthart* (ed.) | Relics, Wrecks & Ruins | CAT Press | |
| 2021 | Lindy Cameron (ed.) | Who Sleuthed It? | Clan Destine | |
| 2021 | Poppy Nwosu (ed.) | Hometown Haunts: #LoveOzYA Horror Tales | Wakefield | |
| 2021 | Deborah Sheldon (ed.) | Spawn: Weird Horror Tales About Pregnancy, Birth and Babies | IFWG Publishing Australia | |
| 2022 | Mykaela Saunders (ed.) | This All Come Back Now | University of Queensland Press | |
| 2022 | Julie Bozza (ed.) | Queer Weird West Tales | LIBRAtiger | |
| 2022 | Tehani Croft with Stephanie Lai (eds.) | The Art of Being Human | FableCroft Publishing | |
| 2022 | L. E. Daniels & Christa Carmen (eds.) | We Are Providence | Weird House Press | |
| 2022 | Narrelle M. Harris (ed.) | Clamour and Mischief | Clan Destine Press | |
| 2022 | Rafeif Ismail and Ellen van Neerven (ed.) | Unlimited Futures | Fremantle Press | |
| 2023 | Jonathan Strahan (ed.) | The Book of Witches: An Anthology | Voyager | |
| 2023 | Gillian Hagenus (ed.) | Strangely Enough | MidnightSun Publishing | |
| 2023 | Seth Malacari (ed.) | An Unexpected Party | Fremantle Press | |
| 2024 | Samuel Maguire (ed.) | Far-Flung | Tiny Owl Workshop | |
| 2024 | Eugen Bacon & Gene Rowe (eds.) | Fission #4 | British Science Fiction Association | |
| 2024 | Andrew Cull & Gabino Iglesias | Found 2: More Stories of Found Footage Horror | Vermilion To One Press | |
| 2024 | Aidan Demmers (ed.) | Celestial Bodies | Tiny Owl Workshop | |
| 2024 | Cat Sparks & Kaaron Warren (eds.) | Calvaria Fell: Stories | Meerkat Press | |
| 2024 | Jonathan Strahan (ed.) | New Adventures in Space Opera | Tachyon Publications | |
| 2025 | Matt Richardson, Michaela Teschendorff & Ciar Fhearchair (eds.) | AUSTRAL 2025 | Meridian Australis | |
| 2025 | Canberra Speculative Fiction Guild (ed.) | Never Say Die | Canberra Speculative Fiction Guild Publishing | |
| 2025 | Gene Rowe & Eugen Bacon (eds.) | Fission #5: An Anthology of Stories from the British Science Fiction Association | British Science Fiction Association | |
| 2025 | Marty Young (ed.) | Midnight Echo 20 | Australasian Horror Writers Association | |

== See also ==
- Ditmar Award, an Australian science fiction award established in 1969
