= Deodand (disambiguation) =

A deodand is a thing forfeited or given to God, specifically, in law, an object or instrument that becomes forfeited because it has caused a person's death

Deodand may also refer to:

- Deodand (fictional creature), a fictional creature from Jack Vance's Dying Earth fantasy works
- "Deodand" (Karl Schroeder), a novelette by Karl Schroeder
