= Gwenda Bond =

American author

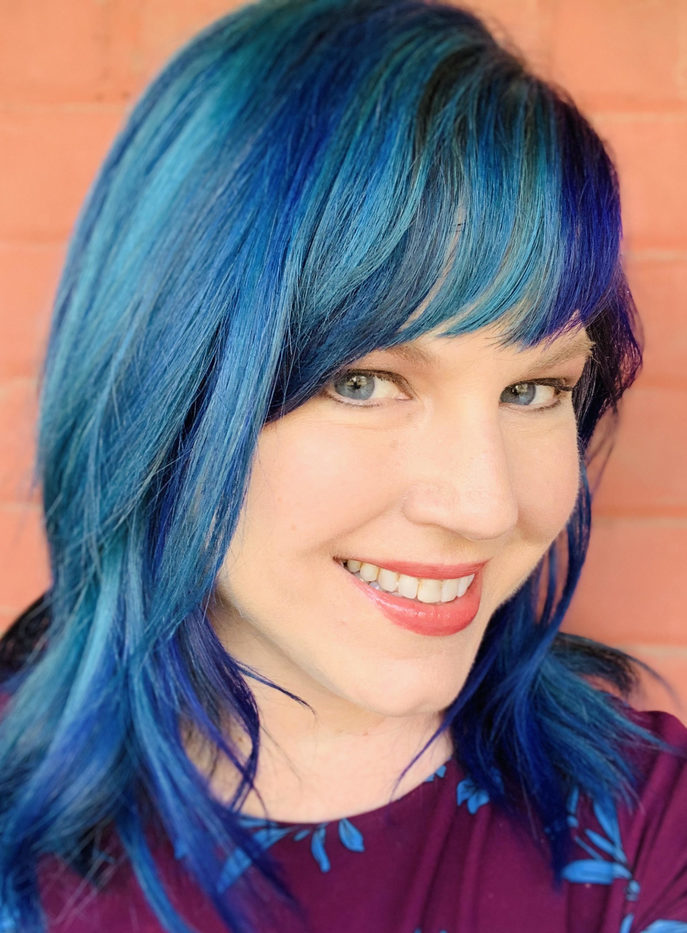
- Bond in 2019
- Born: July 12, 1976 (age 50); Jackson County, Kentucky, U.S.
- Education: Vermont College of Fine Arts (MFA)
- Occupation: Writer
- Writing career
- Period: 2003–present
- Genres: superhero, juvenile fantasy, science fiction

Gwenda Bond (born July 12, 1976) is an American author of science fiction and fantasy, young adult, and romance novels. A novelist since 2012, she is also a member of the Clarion Workshop faculty for 2022, and has been a judge for the Bradbury Prize, the World Fantasy Award, the Otherwise Award, and the SLF Fountain Award.

== Biography ==
Bond was born on July 12, 1976 in Jackson County, Kentucky. Her parents were both principals.

Bond majored in journalism at Eastern Kentucky University, whereupon she worked for the state government in public health communications for 17 years, publishing articles and stories in her spare time. She was a spokesperson for the Kentucky Cabinet for Health and Family Services. While working, she obtained a Masters of Fine Arts degree at Vermont College of Fine Arts, acquired an agent, and shopped around four manuscripts before finally getting a contract in 2012 for Blackwood. She has since published more than a dozen books. She is a co-founder of the Lexington Writer's Room, a nonprofit organization.

Bond began her fiction publishing career with her "Dear Aunt Gwenda" series of fanciful advice columns published from 2003 to 2011 in Lady Churchill's Rosebud Wristlet. In 2011, she edited the summer issue of the science fiction magazine Subterranean Online, published by Subterranean Press, which was a sixth-place finalist for the Locus Award. Her first published book was the science fiction novel, Blackwood, released in 2012, which was a finalist for the Locus, ultimately placing sixth. In addition to her original speculative fiction, Bond has been a prominent writer of franchise tie-in novels, including the first novel set in the Stranger Things universe, the New York Times bestseller Suspicious Minds. Since 2015, Bond has published three novels in the DC Stories Metaverse starring Lois Lane.

Her nonfiction credits include pieces that have been published in Publishers Weekly, Locus, Salon, the Los Angeles Times. She currently serves as faculty for the Clarion Workshop for speculative fiction writers. In addition to having five times being nominated for the Locus Award, she has served as a judge for the SLF Fountain Award (2006), the Otherwise Award,(2008), the World Fantasy Award (2020), and the Bradbury Prize (2022). She has been nominated for the Locus Award five times and is a winner of the RWA Veritas Award. She received the 2020 Bob Clampett Humanitarian Award with Kami Garcia and Sam Humphries for co-founding the Creators 4 Comics fundraising initiative for comic shops and independent bookstores during the early days of the COVID pandemic.

== Personal life ==
Bond met her ex-husband, writer Christopher Rowe, with whom she has written the middle grade series, the Supernormal Sleuthing Service, in 2001 at a writers conference. The two were married in 2004 and divorced in 2023. She currently lives in Lexington, Kentucky.

== Awards ==
- '"Romancing the Recession," Publishers Weekly, RWA Veritas Award Winner, 2010
- Summer 2011, Subterranean Online, Best Magazine Locus Finalist (6th), 2012
- Blackwood, Best New Novel Locus Finalist (6th), 2013
- The Woken Gods, Best Young Adult Book Locus Finalist (8th), 2014
- Girl on a Wire, Best Young Adult Book Locus Finalist (9th), 2015
- Lois Lane, Best Young Adult Book Locus Finalist (8th), 2017
- Creators4Comics Initiative, Bob Clampett Humanitarian Award Winner, with co-founders Kami Garcia and Sam Humphries, 2020

== Partial bibliography ==
=== Blackwood ===
- Blackwood (2012)
- Strange Alchemy (2017)

=== Girl on a Wire ===
- Girl on a Wire (2014)
- Girl in the Shadows (2016)

=== Lois Lane ===
- Fallout (2015)
- Double Down (2016)
- Triple Threat (2017)

=== Match Made in Hell ===
- Not Your Average Hot Guy (2021)
- The Date from Hell (2022)

=== Stranger Things ===
- Suspicious Minds (2019)

=== Mr. & Mrs. Witch ===
- Mr. and Mrs. Witch (2023)

=== The Supernatural Sleuthing Service ===
- The Lost Legacy (2017)
- The Sphinx's Secret (2019)
