= The Summoning (novel) =

Novel by Kelley Armstrong

- Cover of The Summoning
- Author: Kelley Armstrong
- Language: English
- Series: Darkest Powers
- Genre: Paranormal; Horror; Paranormal Romance; Urban Fantasy
- Publisher: HarperTeen
- Publication date: July 1, 2008
- Publication place: United States
- Media type: Print (Softcover)
- Pages: 390
- ISBN: 978-0-06-166269-0
- Followed by: The Awakening

The Summoning is a novel by Kelley Armstrong, and is the first book in the Darkest Powers series. It was released on July 1, 2008.

== Plot ==
Chloe Saunders believes things are finally starting to go right in her life – a boy asks her about the dance, Chloe gets on the directors list for a short, she finally gets her period at age 15, dyes her hair red so she could actually look her age, and commits her first crime. Little did she know, her entire world was about to turn upside down. After an incident at school, the label 'schizophrenic' is slapped on Chloe and she's shipped away to the dreadful Lyle group home for the 'crazies.' There, Chloe meets the jealous Tori, antisocial Derek, hottie Simon, Peter, and her two friends (Rae and Liz) – and realizes that not everything is as it seems.

== Characters ==
- Chloe Saunders is a white American fifteen-year-old girl who aspires to become a film director and goes to an art school. She is diagnosed with schizophrenia. Although she is given a choice, the options make it clear that Lyle House was forced upon her for an expedient recovery. She is actually a necromancer, someone who is able to see and raise ghosts from the dead. She is taken to Lyle House after seeing a ghost and reacting violently to get away from the ghost. Chloe comes to realize the others' powers, and that they were all placed in Lyle House. She gets along particularly well with Rae and Simon, developing some feelings for Simon later, but she isn't sure about her relationship for Derek. She is contacted several times by her former roommate, Liz, who was transferred, and derives her suspicion from the fact that Liz would have to be a ghost, and therefore dead, for her to speak with Chloe. Chloe escapes Lyle House after learning of its true nature from its ghosts. Near the end Chloe escapes and flees her town so she will not be recognized.
- Derek Souza is a white American sixteen-year-old who is described as extremely tall, having black hair, green eyes, and antisocial problems. He often frightens Chloe due to his strength, but this is later attributed to the fact that he is a werewolf, capable of extreme strength, speed, hearing, scent, and sight. Derek and his foster brother, Simon, share a close bond. Derek at first wants to stay behind while the others make their escape, because he thinks he is dangerous and that Lyle House is where he belongs. Despite hesitance on both sides, he and Chloe become better friends through trying to escape and his helping her with her necromancer problems, and after she witnesses him shapeshifting. He is diagnosed with antisocial personality disorder at Lyle House, and he is there because of an incident months ago caused by his protecting Simon against a racially motivated attack.
- Rachelle "Rae" Rogers is another fifteen-year-old who is a half-demon, able to produce and project fire from her skin, a skill which she demonstrates early on by burning Tori, one of the other girls who she does not get along with. She is revealed as a half-demon only after she has been diagnosed with pyromania at Lyle House. Rae's powers only manifest when she is especially angry. Rae develops a close friendship with Chloe, being the first she confides in, becoming her roommate after Liz leaves, and is suggested by her to escape with them. She is captured along with Chloe after going to her Aunt Lauren for help. She is described as having copper skin and long, dark curls. Believed to have been taken by her biological mother.
- Simon Bae is a sorcerer of Korean and Swedish descent who can cast spells, such as levitation and mist projection. He is fifteen years old. His father, a lawyer named Kit Bae, worked for the Edison Group, eventually adopting Simon's foster brother, Derek, with whom he shares a close bond. Simon is actually Tori's brother, which is revealed in Awakening. Simon is shown to be very easygoing, as opposed to Derek's tense nature, and is diabetic. He develops feelings for Chloe, agreeing to help her escape. He will do anything for his brother, which influences Derek's decision to stay after choosing to distract Davidoff for the girls to escape. He has not been diagnosed; he is at Lyle House because Derek was taken there and their father is missing.
- Victoria "Tori" Enright is an American sixteen-year-old who was best friends with Liz and is a Witch-spellcaster. She is shown to have a crush on Simon, who does not return her feelings. She views Chloe and Simon always hanging out as Chloe "stealing" him. She also does not get along with Rae, confronting her several times. Liz was her only close friend at Lyle House. It is speculated that Tori has been diagnosed with bipolar disorder. Tori and Simon are secretly brother and sister, but it is not revealed until Kelley Armstrong's new book, Awakening. She is described as tall with short spiky black hair, she is also half Korean.
- Elizabeth "Liz" Delaney is a white American sixteen-year-old who was Chloe's roommate before she left Lyle House. She was best friends with Tori. It is thought that she is a shaman and can unknowingly use astral projection, which results in her transfer after she unwittingly throws a pencil at one of the nurses, but she is actually a half-demon with the power of telekinesis. Liz is transferred, and as Chloe later learns, killed, due to her powers getting out of hand. Her ghost appears to Chloe several times without Liz being aware of herself being dead, and she is summoned by Chloe after she is taken captive again. She is described as having long blond hair and being very talkative.
- Dr. Lauren Fellows is Chloe's aunt, who is very protective of her. She is the woman Chloe trusts most in the world, and who she goes to after escaping from Lyle House with a wounded arm. However, Aunt Lauren betrays her to Dr. Davidoff, drugging her and taking her to a hospital. However, later she redeems herself after sacrificing herself to save Chloe, Derek, Simon, and Tori.
- Dr. Marcel Davidoff is the head of Lyle House, a scientist who oversees all patients and reports on their progress from time to time. He helps capture Chloe and Rae, and is shown to have influence over what the doctors can and cannot do.
- Diane Enright is Tori's mother. She is a Witch-spellcaster. She is also a financier who donates a lot of money to Lyle House, shown in the excerpt to have influence over even Davidoff.
