= The Gathering (Armstrong novel) =

2011 novel by Kelley Armstrong

- Cover of The Gathering
- Author: Kelley Armstrong
- Language: English
- Series: Darkness Rising
- Genre: Paranormal; Horror; Urban Fantasy
- Publisher: HarperTeen
- Publication date: April 12, 2011
- Publication place: Canada
- Pages: 359 pp
- ISBN: 978-0-06-179702-6
- Preceded by: The Reckoning
- Followed by: The Calling

The Gathering is a novel by Canadian writer Kelley Armstrong, released April 12, 2011 by HarperTeen. The Gathering is the first book in Armstrong's Darkness Rising trilogy. Darkness Rising is the second trilogy in the Darkest Powers series. Darkness Rising follows a new set of kids. The Darkness Rising trilogy follows a sixteen-year-old girl named Maya Delaney.

== Plot summary ==
The setting for The Gathering is a small medical-research town called Salmon Creek on Vancouver Island. Salmon Creek was built by St. Cloud Corporation, the owners of the town and surrounding park. It was built for their employees. Maya, the main character, is the adopted daughter of the park ranger. The events actually start a year before with the death of Maya's friend, Serena. She and Maya were swimming in a lake. Serena, captain of Salmon Creek High swim team, drowned in the lake, and Maya is guiltridden for not being able to save her friend.

A year later, Maya is getting ready to celebrate her sweet 16. She wants to tattoo her birthmark—a paw-print shape on her hip. She doesn't want it altered in any way, though; she just wants to make it more noticeable. However, she doesn't get it because the tattoo artist's aunt insults her by calling her a witch in Navajo. Later, she invites Rafe, a new bad-boy at school, to her birthday party at Daniel's house. At the party, the teens have a competition on Maya's new rock wall: if she can beat all the guys, they have to add more footholds, but if she loses to even one guy, she has to kiss him.

After she defeats all the contestants, Rafe shows up. He challenges Maya individually, and beats her. He doesn't kiss her, though, promising to claim his prize without prying eyes. Maya and Rafe then start going out. One day, when Maya was going over to his house for dinner with him and his childish older sister, Annie, she is attacked by someone looking for Rafe. She sees Annie transform from a cougar into herself.

Rafe tells that skinwalkers are people with special abilities including being able to shift into mountain lions, and the ability to heal and communicate with other animals. He says that Rafe, Maya, and Annie are skinwalkers and that they carry their animal traits with them even in human form. This explains Maya's enhanced hearing and night vision as well as her amazing skill of rehabilitating injured and sick animals. Maya makes the connection between her paw-shaped birthmark and the fact that she is skinwalker. Rafe confirms this idea, saying that paw-print birthmarks indicate skinwalkers and that her and Annie both have them.

He also explains that skinwalkers had been extinct until an experiment to bring them back was enacted. He says that their birth mothers were selected to be part of this experiment because of their Native American DNA, but they didn't realize what was going on. Rafe thinks that Maya's biological mother learned the truth about the experiment, which would explain why she abandoned Maya when she was a baby. Maya also learns she may have a twin brother from whom she was separated at birth. Rafe explains that skinwalkers can't control when they shift and points out the symptoms that occur in a skinwalker before they shift, Maya realizes that she is going through these symptoms and may shift soon. Maya dumps Rafe after thinking that he dated her only because of her being a skinwalker, however, Rafe truly does have romantic feelings for her.

That same night, Annie disappeared while she was still in cougar form and her location is unknown by all characters. Rafe knows that Annie often runs off after she shifts, but is worried for her safety, especially when the forest catches fire. Maya, Daniel, and Rafe are in the forest during the fire, and start to run away when they see people. Daniel's asks Rafe and Maya to lay low because his special danger sense is tingling. They listen in on the people's conversation, and figure out that this group of people set the forest on fire in order to distract the town. The people would then break into the St. Clouds labs in order to steal the secrets housed there. The book ends after Maya, Daniel, Nicole, and an unconscious Rafe escape in a helicopter and report what they overheard to town officials.

== Characters ==
=== Maya Delaney ===
Maya is a sixteen-year-old girl who lives in Salmon Creek. Maya moved to Salmon Creek from Oregon, when she was five. She is the main protagonist. Maya is a Native American with black hair, she's 5'5". She has very little knowledge of her origins because she was adopted when she was young and has no interest in finding her biological mother seeing as she lost her chance to be a mom years ago, and she loves her adoptive parents. She has a birthmark in the shape of a paw on her hip. Her father is the warden of Salmon Creek Park. Maya loves animals and when her dad finds injured animals in the park, Maya nurses them back to health. She attends Salmon Creek High with Daniel and her only pet is her German Shepherd, Kenjii who was given to Maya to protect her from wild predators. Wildlife especially the cougars seem to be attracted to Maya. She discovers she's skinwalker through Rafe. Maya is afraid of shifting because Rafe told her that Annie began to lose her humanity and become more animal-like from her shifting. Maya learns that she's only half Native American though her mother had Native blood and it is assumed her father is Native American. However, she begins shifting in The Calling. She also meets her biological father, Calvin Antone, a Nast employee who tries to capture her and her friends. In The Rising, Maya meets her twin brother, Ash, who, though they get off to a rough start, they start to grow closer as brother and sister by the end of the book. In The Rising, she begins to show signs of regressing, like Annie, only instead she becomes angry for no reason and begins acting more like a predator. She and Rafe end up breaking up in the book as she realizes she is truly in love with Daniel, as they finally kiss and start dating in the epilogue. Maya is now on good terms with Rafe as friends, and is also good friends with Derek and Chloe.

=== Rafael "Rafe" Martinez ===
Rafe has amber eyes and black hair to his shoulders. He often wears a leather jacket and has several tattoos. He's about 6'0" and described to be a couple of inches taller than Daniel. Rafe tells everybody he is from Texas and Hispanic. Maya on the other hand does not believe either of these things for a second. His facial features and his lack of Texan drawl makes her think that he is Native American. His good looks, mysterious "bad-boy" reputation, and the fact he is the only new guy makes him popular with girls.

Rafe and Annie live in a cabin in the forest in Salmon Creek. Annie has been Rafe's legal guardian since his mother's death, but Annie is mentally "slow." Towards the beginning of the novel, Rafe tells Maya he is in hiding because he stole some money from people and now they are out to get him. However, at the end, Maya realizes the real reason Rafe was hiding was to protect Annie from the town. This is because he realized that if the town knew of Annie's mental state, she would be taken away. He knew this must be prevented because of her uncontrollable shifting. Rafe falls for Maya as he starts dating her in order to find out if she is a skin-walker. When she finds out about this, she ends it, but starts falling in love with him too.

In The Calling, Rafe falls out of a helicopter while Maya is trying to hold on to him, as if he hadn't let go, she would've fallen with him. He is presumed to be dead, but later in the book, is revealed to have survived the fall, though it injured him. However, the Nasts bugged his clothes and sent him as a spy to Maya and her friends, forcing him to tell Maya and get captured by the Nasts.

They are reunited in The Rising when Maya is captured, but managed to escape the Nasts facility and get out into the wilderness with Daniel, Corey, Hayley, and Ash. However, Rafe starts to doubt that Maya doesn't have feelings for Daniel, causing her to become furious with him when he convinces her that Daniel is in love with her. However, after they go to the new Salmon Creek, Rafe decides to break off their relationship to give Maya time to figure out where her heart truly lies. Eight months later, Rafe and Maya are just friends as he accepts her decision to be with Daniel.

=== Daniel Bianchi ===
Daniel is very popular because he is a sensible leader and everybody likes to be around him. Daniel grew up with Maya and Serena. When Daniel was 13, his mom left the family. His two older brothers eventually went off to college and are not around to help defend Daniel against his alcoholic father's verbal abuses. Daniel had been dating Serena for about a year when she died. After Serena's death, he became very protective of his best friend Maya. He was grief-stricken after Serena's death, but during the novel, Maya learns that he is ready to move on and maybe even start a new relationship. He has dark blue eyes, blond hair and is about 5'10". He's very muscular from wrestling. He is the island wrestling champion and has protective instincts. When he or Maya is in danger, these instincts kick in and he will always defend the two of them. As events start to unfold, we learn that Daniel gets certain feelings and can sense danger when it's not obvious. Maya has to learn to trust Daniel's feelings because they are almost always correct. This is later revealed to be because Daniel is a benandanti, and has a sort of sixth sense for danger. He also has powers of persuasion and can repel evil. However, his persuasion power only works if his target is willing to be persuaded.

In The Calling, Daniel is one of the three who make it away from the Nasts after the helicopter crash, along with Maya and Corey. While running, he confesses to Maya that when he and Serena went to a school dance together, which was their first date, he didn't actually want to go, and just thought it would be rude to turn her down, and he had intended on breaking up with her, but didn't get the opportunity before she died.

In The Rising, Daniel, Maya, and Corey are on the run from the Nasts. After they witness their own memorial service, and Maya and Ash flee from a Cabal witch, Daniel is hit by a car while he and Corey are fleeing, however they manage to evade capture. The injury isn't too bad, but it is enough to greatly worry Maya when she finds out. However, she finds him, Corey, and Ash completely safe, Daniel, while not in the best shape, but okay, considering. Daniel finds out from Maya that Nicole killed Serena, but Maya leaves out the part where Nicole did so because she wanted Daniel, as she wanted to spare him the guilt. Daniel and Maya's relationship grows in the book as Rafe convinces Maya that Daniel is in love with her. However, after Daniel is shot by a Cabal goon, Maya realizes she feels the same way. In the epilogue, she asks him out and they kiss, sealing their relationship.

=== Nicole Tillson ===
Nicole is the mayor's daughter. Nicole is described to have a pixie face, blue eyes, blond hair, ad she's about 5'1". Nicole is on the swim team and in choir. She was closer to Serena than Maya, but Nicole and Maya became closer in order to comfort each other after Serena's death. They do not have much in common, other than they both lost Serena.

In The Calling, it's revealed by Sam that Nicole is mentally unstable. She was the one who roofied Maya at her party the night she kissed Rafe, and she was the one who drowned Serena because she wanted Daniel. At first Maya doesn't believe this, but when she finds Nicole, captive by the Cabals, and is reluctant to rescue her, Nicole starts ranting at her, hurling insults, and intentionally gives away her position to the guards, nearly getting Maya killed. This is enough to convince Maya of Sam's claims.

In The Rising, Nicole's true mental state is revealed by Sam to everyone in front of Nicole when Maya meets her at the Nasts facility. While Nicole denies this, Sam antagonizes her by insinuating that Maya and Daniel slept together, causing Nicole to become outraged and attack Maya on the spot. In her furious rants, she confesses to having killed Serena. She is revealed to be a xana, which is how she killed her, by being able to hold her breath long enough to drown her, as she could always hold her breath longer than Serena could. Later, Nicole is drugged by Dr. Inglis and released in Maya's room, where she attempts to smother her with a pillow, nearly killing her, however, Maya is able to fight back, and ends up nearly killing Nicole. She leaves the unconscious girl in the room as she tries to escape. Nicole is later seen, bound and blindfolded, being taken into a van during the evacuation of the facility. It is later confirmed that she is being treated by the Nasts, but she will never be let near Maya or her friends ever again.

=== Sam Russo ===
Sam Russo came to live in Salmon Creek when her parents died. The entire town thinks they died in a car crash, but they were actually murdered in home invasion during which Sam survived. She now lives with the Tillsons. Even though she has no resemblance to any of the Tillsons, she is their second cousin. She has dark hair, freckles, blue eyes and is about 5'6". She is an outsider and prefers to stay that way. She gets along with Maya but they are not really friends. The only persons she likes is Daniel, but Maya suspects it's not as a friend. However, it is revealed in The Calling that Sam is an open lesbian.

In The Calling, Sam is the one who tells Maya about Nicole being insane, and her own suspicions that she killed Serena and roofied Maya. Sam is also revealed to be a benandanti, like Daniel, however her powers are not as strong as his. Also, she is not really the Tillson's relative, and has no relation to them whatsoever. It was just a coverup to get her to Salmon Creek. Sam was taken by the Nasts while they were fleeing from them.

In The Rising, Maya meets Sam again after she is captured by the Nasts, and is happy to see her, but doesn't hug her (wisely). When Nicole comes in, Sam is the one to inform the others that she killed Serena. This results in denials and more accusations, until Sam insinuates that Maya had sex with Daniel after the helicopter crash, provoking Nicole into attacking her. Sam is berated for provoking her, as Maya could've been hurt, and she admits she didn't think it all the way through. Sam is later taken away in the van with Nicole and Annie when the facility is evacuated. She doesn't manage to escape, but moves into Badger Lake with the Tillson's after Maya, Kit, and Antone broker the deal with the Nasts.

=== Corey Carling ===
Corey is Daniel's best guy friend. He has a younger brother named Travis and they are the sons of police chief Carling. The two boys are popular at school. Corey is described to be big and burly with dark hair and about 6'1". He's the second place island wrestling champion next to Daniel. He suffers from severe headaches(migraine) which Maya and Daniel worry about. .

=== Hayley Morris ===
Hayley is the only one that has a problem with being in a small town. She doesn't like Maya and is jealous of her. She has feelings toward Rafe and really wants to date him. She is friends with Nicole and also hangs with Corey occasionally. Rafe tells Maya this is because she has caused Hayley to become an outcast from the other Salmon Creek kids because she stole her test when they were younger. Maya has a strong influence over the others. This relationship is repaired in 'The Calling' as she willingly is captured to save Corey, Sam, Daniel and Maya. Maya goes to save her but informs her that it is a trap and that she should leave quickly.
