= The Awakening (Armstrong novel) =

2009 novel by Kelley Armstrong

- First edition (Canada)
- Author: Kelley Armstrong
- Language: English
- Series: Darkest Powers
- Genre: Paranormal; Horror; Paranormal Romance; Urban Fantasy
- Publisher: Doubleday Canada
- Publication date: April 28, 2009
- Publication place: Canada
- Media type: Print (hardcover, Paperback)
- Pages: 368 pp
- ISBN: 978-0-06-166276-8
- Preceded by: The Summoning
- Followed by: The Reckoning

The Awakening is a novel by Kelley Armstrong from Darkest Powers trilogy. It is the sequel to The Summoning.

== Plot ==
The Awakening takes place directly after the events in The Summoning. Chloe has been recaptured by The Edison Group, a team of supernatural scientists responsible for manipulating her DNA, therefore enhancing her necromantic abilities. While there, she discovers that she, and other supernaturals are experimental subjects who were genetically modified at birth.

Chloe and Victoria Enright (Tori, a witch) lead the Edison Group to a factory where they were supposed to meet Derek and Simon. Chloe and Tori escape with help from Liz after struggling with Tori's mother, Diane (also a witch), but not before Diane hits Chloe's aunt Lauren with a seemingly fatal spell. The two girls run and hide. Chloe reads a letter her Aunt Lauren gave her which explains that she only ever wanted to help young supernaturals but it wasn't until her own niece was in danger that she realized how dangerous the Edison Group was. The letter also reveals that Chloes mom had a brother, who died (possibly through suicide) due to a mishap with his powers.

The next day, they meet up with Derek and Simon at the factory. The four of them decide to find Simon and Derek's father (Kit Bae) friend Andrew Carson, who will surely be able to give them a place to stay. He lives in New York, so they decide to take a bus and work from there. On the bus to New York City, Chloe is woken by Derek who tells her that he feels another change coming on. She offers to go with him and asks Tori to tell Simon that if they don't make it back to the bus, they will meet up in New York City. They get off the bus and find some woods near a service station, where Derek prepares for his change. Just like before, it doesn't work. He is exhausted afterwards, so Chloe tells him to get some sleep and they will get on another bus in the morning. After he falls asleep Chloe witnesses the murder of a young girl in the same patch of woods. After realising she cannot interact with it, and that it repeats over and over, she realises that it is a memory from the real murder than occurred there before. She does not sleep that night, for fear of the girl's body still being there in the woods.

Finding that they don't have enough money to take the bus from where they are currently, Chloe and Derek are forced to walk and hitchhike to the next city so they will be able to buy a ticket. That night, they encounter two other wolves, Liam and Ramon, who are man-eaters, wanted by the New York Pack. They want Derek to take the blame for their crimes. However, they know that if they simply capture Derek and give him over, the Alpha might believe his cries of "I didn't do it", so try to force him into going along willingly by promising not to harm Chloe. Derek incapacitates Ramon, freeing Chloe, and they bolt. Liam catches up with them an Chloe stabs him in the thigh, and they manage to get away.

The next morning, finally being close enough to New York to afford the bus fare, Chloe and Derek catch a bus and arrive at Andrew's house, where they find Tori and Simon. But Andrew himself is missing. Suspecting that Andrew has been captured, given that there is still coffee in the pot from that morning, they decide to stay only for the night. Before dawn, the Edison Group attacks them. While hiding, Chloe hears a voice that sounds like her Aunt Lauren's, guiding her to safety. She realizes with some panic that she wouldn't hear Lauren unless she was dead and wonders if The Edison Group has killed her Aunt - not realising that it is, in fact, the ghost of her mother. Chloe and Simon are approached by a man that Simon recognizes as Andrew Carson, the man they've been looking for. Andrew helps them to safety and Derek arrives with Tori. They all escape in a van and Andrew tells them that he's taking them to a safe house for supernaturals where they can rest up and eventually help take down The Edison Group.

== Characters ==
Chloe Saunders is a necromancer and the narrator of The Darkest Power series and is the trilogy's main protagonist, an aspiring filmmaker wannabe who describes herself as being quite plain and unremarkable. Though she admits to at first having a crush on Simon Bae, she also shows signs of being attracted to his brother, Derek Souza with whom she ultimately becomes close to and strikes up a deep friendship.

Derek Souza the Lyle House's resident werewolf, Derek is observed by Chloe as being sullen, quiet, and abrupt. Due to his sheer physical size and brute strength, Chloe finds him scary and imposing. He is the first to tell her about her supernatural abilities and she soon discovers that he is a werewolf, approaching his first change.

Rachelle Rogers is an Exustio half-demon who is at Lyle House after exhibiting a fascination with fire and being diagnosed as a pyromaniac. She quickly befriends Chloe though she later betrays her, under the misguided belief that she is doing the right thing, and allies herself with the Edison Group.

Simon Bae is a charismatic sorcerer who befriends Chloe. She admits to having a crush on him and he appears to share her feelings.

Victoria "Tori" Enright is a minor antagonist in The Summoning though in The Awakening, she becomes an ally to Chloe as they try to escape The Edison Group. Tends to be sarcastic, and is very independent, Also it is found out in The Awakening that Victoria (Tori) is a female spellcaster also known as a witch.

Elizabeth "Liz" Delaney is a friend of Chloe Saunders who was murdered by The Edison Group in The Summoning. After uncontrollable outbursts of power, Liz was removed from Lyle House and executed.

Dr. Lauren Fellows is Chloe's maternal aunt who has served as a mother figure to Chloe. She is a part of the Edison Group though she has no supernatural powers. In a letter to Chloe, Lauren explains that her sister (Chloe's mother) took part in the experiment in order to lessen the chance of having a necromancer child. Her mother feared that any child she had would suffer the same fate as her brother, Ben, who was driven crazy by his powers and committed suicide (though it's possible he was driven to his death by ghosts).

Dr. Marcel Davidoff is a head doctor and leading member of Project Genesis. He appears to be quite friendly and caring though he shows a particular affection for Rae. Chloe discovers that the password on his computer is Rae's birth mother's name, Jacinda, and there are hints that he may have been romantically involved with her.

Diane Enright is a member of the Edison Group and is on the board of Lyle House. She is also Tori Enright's mother and a witch.
