= Reach for Infinity =

2014 science fiction anthology edited by Jonathan Strahan

- US first edition cover
- Editors: Jonathan Strahan
- Author: Various
- Language: English
- Genre: Science fiction
- Published: May 27, 2014
- Publisher: Solaris Books
- Publication place: United States
- Media type: Print (Paperback)
- Pages: 352
- ISBN: 978-1781082034

Reach for Infinity is a 2014 science fiction anthology edited by Jonathan Strahan.

== Contents ==
- "Introduction" (essay) by Jonathan Strahan
- "Break My Fall" (novelette) by Greg Egan
- "The Dust Queen" (short story) by Aliette de Bodard
- "The Fifth Dragon" (novelette) by Ian McDonald
- "Kheldyu" (novelette) by Karl Schroeder
- "Report Concerning the Presence of Seahorses on Mars" (novelette) by Pat Cadigan
- "Hiraeth: A Tragedy in Four Acts" (short story) by Karen Lord
- "Amicae Aeternum" (short story) by Ellen Klages
- "Trademark Bugs: A Legal History" (short story) by Adam Roberts
- "Attitude" (novelette) by Linda Nagata
- "Invisible Planets" (short story) by Hannu Rajaniemi
- "Wilder Still, the Stars" (novelette) by Kathleen Ann Goonan
- "'The Entire Immense Superstructure': An Installation" (short story) by Ken MacLeod
- "In Babelsberg" (short story) by Alastair Reynolds
- "Hotshot" (novelette) by Peter Watts

== Critical reception ==
In 2015, Reach for Infinity was nominated for a Locus Award for Best Anthology, an Aurealis Award for Best Anthology and the Philip K. Dick Award.
