= The Reckoning (Armstrong novel) =

2010 novel by Kelley Armstrong

- Cover of The Reckoning
- Author: Kelley Armstrong
- Language: English
- Series: Darkest Powers
- Genre: Paranormal; Horror; Paranormal Romance; Urban Fantasy
- Publisher: HarperTeen
- Publication date: April 6, 2010
- Publication place: Canada
- Media type: Print (Hardcover, Paperback)
- Pages: 392 pp
- ISBN: 978-0-06-166283-6
- Preceded by: The Awakening
- Followed by: The Gathering

The Reckoning is the final novel in the Darkest Powers Trilogy written by Kelley Armstrong. It was released in the USA April 6, 2010. It is the last in the series. The next trilogy follows a new set of teenagers however Kelley has confirmed Chloe and the others will show up.

== Plot summary ==
Following the events of The Awakening, the story follows Chloe, Derek, Simon and Tori as they live in the Safe House, formally owned by an ex-employee of the Edison Group, with Simon and Derek's father's friend Andrew. Amongst other visiting supernaturals, the four find themselves racing to try to persuade the renegade group of supernaturals to save Chloe's aunt, who may possibly be dead, and Rae, a former member of Lyle house.

Chloe, Derek, Simon and Tori believe they have made it to safety from the Edison group, but after being on the run, the group ends up back under the rule of adults. Chloe and her group of supernatural friends are still finding their way as their powers keep developing and surpassing the adult supernaturals around them. Chloe, Derek, Simon and Tori find themselves in all kinds of mishaps that seem to be the result of bad luck. This leads them to think there's an Edison Group spy amongst them just planning to return them to the lab or kill them.

The love triangle between Chloe, Derek and Simon develops further. The chemistry between Derek and Chloe is obvious to everyone but them. Simon is still in love with Chloe, whom he eventually shows his feelings for. The two go on a date which ends poorly. Simon, having never been hurt by a girl before, is unsure how to react and Chloe feels bad for all of this.

Chloe, Simon, and Tori are handed over to the Edison group by one of the supernatural adults, which proves their suspicions of an Edison spy that killed Andrew and Gwen. Simon and Derek's father comes in time with Derek to save them. During the fight Dr. Davidoff and Tori's mother are killed and the building of the Edison Group is destroyed. Still on the run, they are able to reconcile with each other including the aunt of Chloe and excluding Rae who 'disappeared' before Chloe, Simon, and Tori were handed over. In the end, Chloe and Derek get together.
