= Engineering Infinity =

2010 anthology edited by Jonathan Strahan

- US first edition cover
- Editors: Jonathan Strahan
- Author: Various
- Language: English
- Genre: Science fiction
- Published: December 28, 2010 (US); January 6, 2011 (UK)
- Publisher: Solaris Books
- Publication place: United States
- Media type: Print (Paperback)
- Pages: 391 (US); 333 (UK)
- ISBN: 1-907-51952-1 (US)

Engineering Infinity is a science fiction anthology edited by Jonathan Strahan. It was nominated for a Locus Award for Best Anthology in 2012.

== Contents ==
The anthology includes 15 stories:

- "Beyond the Gernsback Continuum ..." by Jonathan Strahan (Introduction)
- "Malak" by Peter Watts (short story)
- "Watching the Music Dance" by Kristine Kathryn Rusch (short story)
- "Laika's Ghost" (Gennady Malianov series) by Karl Schroeder (novelette)
- "The Invasion of Venus" by Stephen Baxter (short story)
- "The Server and the Dragon" by Hannu Rajaniemi (short story)
- "Bit Rot" (Saturn's Children) by Charles Stross (novelette)
- "Creatures with Wings" by Kathleen Ann Goonan (novelette)
- "Walls of Flesh, Bars of Bone" by Damien Broderick and Barbara Lamar (novelette)
- "Mantis" by Robert Reed (novelette)
- "Judgement Eve" by John C. Wright (novelette)
- "A Soldier of the City" by David Moles (novelette)
- "Mercies" by Gregory Benford (novelette)
- "The Ki-anna" by Gwyneth Jones (novelette)
- The Birds and the Bees and the Gasoline Trees by John Barnes (novella)

== Critical reception ==
Engineering Infinity was nominated for a Locus Award for Best Anthology in 2012.
