= The New Space Opera =

Science fiction anthology by Gardner Dozois and Jonathan Strahan

- Editors: Gardner Dozois; Jonathan Strahan
- Language: English
- Genre: Science fiction
- Publisher: Eos
- Publication date: 2007
- Publication place: United States
- Media type: Print (Paperback)
- Pages: 515
- ISBN: 978-0-06-084675-6
- OCLC: 171049854
- Dewey Decimal: 813/.0876608 22
- LC Class: PS648.S3 N47 2007
- Followed by: The New Space Opera 2

The New Space Opera is a science fiction anthology edited by Gardner Dozois and Jonathan Strahan. It was published in 2007, and includes all original stories selected to represent the genre of space opera. It includes a five-page introduction, plus a brief introduction to each of the stories, and a dedication to Jack Dann. The front and back covers include endorsements by Orson Scott Card, Charles Stross, Joe Haldeman, Vernor Vinge, and Greg Bear. Ten out of the eighteen stories in the book were selected for the Locus recommended reading list for 2007. The book won the Locus Award for Best Anthology in 2008.

The anthology was followed with The New Space Opera 2 in 2009.

== Contents ==
- Gwyneth Jones: "Saving Tiamaat"
- Ian McDonald: "Verthandi's Ring"
- Robert Reed: "Hatch"
- Paul J. McAuley: "Winning Peace"
- Greg Egan: "Glory"
- Kage Baker: "Maelstrom"
- Peter F. Hamilton: "Blessed by an Angel"
- Ken MacLeod: "Who's Afraid of Wolf 359?"
- Tony Daniel: "The Valley of the Gardens"
- James Patrick Kelly: "Dividing the Sustain"
- Alastair Reynolds: "Minla's Flowers"
- Mary Rosenblum: "Splinters of Glass"
- Stephen Baxter: "Remembrance"
- Robert Silverberg: "The Emperor and the Maula"
- Gregory Benford: "The Worm Turns"
- Walter Jon Williams: "Send Them Flowers"
- Nancy Kress: "Art of War"
- Dan Simmons: "Muse of Fire"
