= The New Space Opera 2 =

Science fiction anthology by Gardner Dozois and Jonathan Strahan

The New Space Opera 2: All-new stories of science fiction adventure
- Cover of the first edition
- Editors: Gardner Dozois and Jonathan Strahan
- Cover artist: Stephan Martiniere
- Language: English
- Genre: Science fiction
- Publisher: HarperVoyager
- Publication date: 2009
- Publication place: United States
- Media type: Print (Paperback)
- Pages: 560
- ISBN: 978-0-06-156235-8
- Preceded by: The New Space Opera

The New Space Opera 2 is a science fiction anthology edited by Gardner Dozois and Jonathan Strahan. It was published in 2009, and includes all original stories selected to represent the genre of space opera. Five of the stories in the book were selected for the Locus recommended reading list for 2009. The book won the Locus Award for Best Anthology in 2010.

This anthology follows The New Space Opera which was published in 2007.

== Contents ==
- Robert Charles Wilson: "Utriusque Cosmi"
- Peter Watts: "The Island"
- John Kessel: "Events Preceding the Helvetican Renaissance"
- Cory Doctorow: "To Go Boldly"
- John Barnes: "The Lost Princess Man"
- Kristine Kathryn Rusch: "Defect"
- Jay Lake: "To Raise a Mutiny Betwixt Yourselves"
- Neal Asher: "Shell Game"
- Garth Nix: "Punctuality"
- Sean Williams: "Inevitable"
- Bruce Sterling: "Join the Navy and See the Worlds"
- Bill Willingham: "Fearless Space Pirates of The Outer Rings"
- John Meaney: "From the Heart"
- Elizabeth Moon: "Chameleons"
- Tad Williams: "The Tenth Muse"
- Justina Robson: Cracklegrackle"
- John Scalzi: "The Tale of the Wicked"
- Mike Resnick: "Catastrophe Baker and A Canticle For Leibowitz"
- John C. Wright: "The Far End of History"
