= Gennady Malianov =

- First appearance: The Dragon of Pripyat
- Last appearance: Kheldyu
- Created by: Karl Schroeder

In-universe information
- Gender: Male
- Occupation: Nuclear arms inspector
- Nationality: Ukrainian

Gennady Malianov is a fictional detective from a cycle of science fiction / techno thriller stories by Canadian writer Karl Schroeder set in the near future. He is generally portrayed as an independent nuclear arms inspector who takes on investigations involving dangers connected to radioactive substances.

In 2026, Malianov stories were collected in Schroeder's book titled Laika's Ghost.

== Overview ==
Malianov is a "pathologically shy Ukrainian arms inspector and anti-James Bond", "neither dashing nor brave, not a killer, manipulator or even particularly clever". Within the context of technological progress, he is neither optimist, nor apocalyptic pessimist. Regardless of rises and falls in the world, Malianov works hard to clean up the mess, thus working towards progress. As Schroeder puts it: "Shooting radioactive camels in the Gobi desert (Note: Shooting radioactive camels in China, as well as tracking the "Becquerel reindeer" carcasses in Norway, are mentioned in the setup of the story "To Hie from Far Cilenia".) is one of the prices to be paid for our industrialist past, and somebody has to pay it. Gennady represents that side of technological progress that we in SF so rarely acknowledge: he's a trash collector," "a world's janitor".

Malianov is a favorite of the writer.

The introduction to the book Laika's Ghost describes the history of writing of these stories.

== Stories ==
All stories are included Schroeder's bookLaika's Ghost, in a non-chronological order.

"The Dragon of Pripyat", 1999

Tesseracts 8 anthology, Tesseract Books, 1999.) ISBN 978-1-895836-61-5

Malianov enters the Chernobyl exclusion zone to investigate an extortionist's threat to breach the nuclear containment "sarcophagus" and dump the radioactive waste into the Pripyat River. Also there are rumors about a dragon in the area.

"Alexander's Road", 2005

The Engine of Recall ISBN 0889953236

Malianov's search of missing stolen uranium leads him to a search of two stolen Soviet nuclear bombs, hidden under abandoned oil derricks in Azerbaijan. Nominated for the Aurora Award for Best Short Fiction in 2006.

"To Hie from Far Cilenia", 2008

METAtropolis: The Dawn of Uncivilization

Malianov is tracking some stolen plutonium to be smuggled, and finds that the illegal deals are carried out in virtual states. The story is set in near future, with advanced developments in the area of virtual reality and information networking.

"Deodand", 2010

Originally published in METAtropolis: Cascadia

In the story, a deodand is an artificial intelligence that represents some system of the nature: a lake, a pack of wolves, etc. As such, the deodands try to optimize the interests of the systems they represent. Malianov runs into them during a temporary gig after the events from the Cilenia story: a robotics company hires him to figure out why their AI misbehave.

"Laika's Ghost", 2010

Engineering Infinity, edited by Jonathan Strahan, December 2010

Paul Kincaid in his review of the 2012 "Best of the Year" anthologies called it one of the best stories in the reviewed collections. He sees it as a reflection of the growing pessimism in science fiction: [Malianov] "discovers that the only people ready to take up the dream of flight to other worlds are aged remnants of the former Soviet Union". Schroeder disagrees with Kincaid's judgement: in the broader context of Malianov stories, the world is not exhausted in its energy, it merely shifts the gears.

The title alludes to Laika, a Soviet space dog.

"Kheldyu", 2014

Reach for Infinity, edited by Jonathan Strahan, May 2014

An Achille Marceau builds solar updraft towers in Siberia, which generate electricity while taking CO_{2} out of the air, thus supposedly helping to combat the global warming while profiting from the market in carbon. However, Malianov notices an environmental disaster in the area. With the help of an ally, who is Achille's sister and UN's arms inspector, the sinister design is thwarted in an action-packed story.

Shroeder describes "Kheldyu" as "my most pessimistic Gennady Malianov piece".
