= METAtropolis =

Series of science fiction audiobook collections

METAtropolis is a series of science fiction audiobook collections.

In 2008, Audible.com released the audiobook anthology METAtropolis, edited by John Scalzi and featuring short fiction in a shared world created by Scalzi, Elizabeth Bear, Tobias S. Buckell, Jay Lake, and Karl Schroeder. METAtropolis was planned from the beginning to be released as an audio anthology prior to any print edition. The audiobook featured the voices of Battlestar Galactica actors Michael Hogan, Alessandro Juliani and Kandyse McClure. In 2009 Subterranean Press released a limited edition print run of METAtropolis, which was subsequently published by Tor in a standard hardcover edition, in 2010.

In 2009 METAtropolis: The Dawn of Uncivilization received nominations for the Audie Award for Original Work and the Hugo Award for Best Dramatic Presentation, Long Form.

In 2012 the Audie Award for Original Work was given to METAtropolis: Cascadia.

In 2015 METAtropolis: The Wings We Dare Aspire was a finalist for the Endeavour Award (for the best book by a writer from the Pacific Northwest).

Several stories of the series were selected for various "Best of" and other anthologies.

== METAtropolis series ==
1. 2008: METAtropolis: The Dawn of Uncivilization
  1. Jay Lake, "In the Forests of the Night"
  2. Tobias Buckell, "Stochasti-city"
  3. Elizabeth Bear, "The Red in the Sky is Our Blood"
  4. John Scalzi, "Utere nihil non extra quiritationem suis"
  5. Karl Schroeder, "To Hie from Far Cilenia"
2. 2010: METAtropolis: Cascadia
  1. Jay Lake, "The Bull Dancers"
  2. Mary Robinette Kowal, "Water to Wine"
  3. Tobias S. Buckell, "Byways"
  4. Elizabeth Bear, "Confessor"
  5. Karl Schroeder, "Deodand"
  6. Ken Scholes, "A Symmetry of Serpents and Doves"
3. 2013: METAtropolis: Green Space
  1. "Rock of Ages", by Jay Lake
  2. "Green and Dying", by Elizabeth Bear
  3. "The Desire Lines", by Karl Schroeder
  4. "Midway Bells & Dying Breeds", by Seanan McGuire
  5. "Tensegrity", by Tobias S. Buckell
  6. "Forest of Memories", by Mary Robinette Kowal
  7. "Let Me Hide Myself in Thee", by Ken Scholes
4. 2014: METAtropolis: The Wings We Dare Aspire
  1. Foreword, by Kevin J. Anderson
  2. Introduction, by Steve Feldberg
  3. "In the Forests of the Night", by Jay Lake
  4. "The Bull Dancers", by Jay Lake
  5. "A Symmetry of Serpents and Doves", by Ken Scholes
  6. "Rock of Ages", by Jay Lake
  7. "Let Me Hide Myself in Thee", by Ken Scholes

The stories from METAtropolis-1 are set in the cities of a shared near future postapocalyptic world, whose common setting was worked out by the contributors together. Unlike most postapocalyptic tales, the ones in the anthology are optimistic: from the chaos of a collapsed civilization a better way of life may arise.

While METAtropolis-1 is set in the United States, its continuation, METAtropolis-2, is set in the new city-state of Cascadia emerging in the Pacific Northwest of the former United States and Canada, (Note: Cascadia is a reference to the Cascade Range stretching in the area) originated in Jay Lake's story "In the Forests of the Night".

The stories in METAtropolis 1 and 2 are prefaced with the editor's commentary on the origin of the story and its place within METAtropolis.

Publisher's summary for METAtropolis: Green Space:

As METAtropolis: Green Space moves into the 22nd Century, human social evolution is heading in new directions after the Green Crash and the subsequent Green Renaissance. Nearly everyone who cares to participate in the wired world has become part of the "Internet of things", a virtual environment mapped across all aspects of the natural experience. At the same time, the serious back-to-the-land types have embraced a full-on paleo lifestyle, including genetically engineering themselves and their offspring. At the same time, a back-to-space movement is seeking the moon, a green Mars, and even the stars, with the eventual goal of leaving a pristine and undisturbed Earth behind.

In the foreword to the METAtropolis: The Wings We Dare Aspire, Kevin J. Anderson, the operator of the small publishing company WordFire Press which published the book, explained that since Jay Lake was dying of cancer, there was no time to wait for major publishers to process the print edition of METAtropolis, hence the release by WordFire. The volume represents a kind of a "story within a story" in METAtropolis, created by the two authors.
