= Ventus Gaming =

South African esports organisation

- Short name: VT
- Divisions: Call of Duty; Counter-Strike: Global Offensive; Dota 2 League of Legends; Overwatch; StarCraft 2
- Founded: August 2009
- Based in: Cape Town, South Africa
- Location: Denmark; South Africa
- Manager: Pieter "Cyrus" Venter
- Partners: Corsair

Ventus Gaming is a professional esports organisation based in South Africa. It was founded in 2009 by Pieter Venter. Ventus Gaming fields teams in many different games which includes both PC and console gaming platforms. The organisation was officially launched on 28 March 2010.

The organisation's League of Legends team, Ventus Esports, is based in Denmark and competes in the European Masters tournament.

== History ==
In July 2009 Pieter "Cyrus" Venter came to an agreement with Pienaar Kloppers (Vodacom Gaming Product Manager). The agreement stated that XploIT, led by Pieter Venter, would advertise and regularly make use of the Vodacom Gaming Servers, thus increasing Vodacom's popularity and exposure. In return Vodacom would sponsor XploIT.

Venter's next step was to negotiate and recruit individual teams under the XploIT name. This task proved relatively straightforward, as the backing of Vodacom, an established a closed company in terms of the South African Companies Act. The accompanying promise of sponsorship was highly sought after by local teams.

With the promise of 5 plane tickets to Rage Expo, Venter and Stephen "Vitrolic" White took the previously merged Brazen and XploIT Cod4 teams and renamed the merged team, Team Vodacom Call of Duty 4. There were to be further sponsorship discussions, scheduled after Rage Expo, conditional to Team Vodacom's performance at the event.

In August 2009 a meeting was held with Kloppers where everything seemed set to go. The contractual signing of the sponsorship a last minor detail to be taken care of. Venter launched Team Vodacom and all players took up the VG tag in game and on IRC. An article was also published on MyGaming and DoGaming.

Soon after the article was published Vodacom HQ contacted Kloppers and informed him that he had no authority to sign such a sponsorship or use Vodacom's name as he had. The order was given to revert to the previous names of Brazen and XploIT for COD4 & TF2 and the other titles respectively while the matter was settled. Team Vodacom was put back on the table for discussion, but following failure after failure Venter finally gave up hope and announced the cancellation of Team Vodacom on August the 17th.

Venter and White discussed what their next move would be and decided to change back to Brazen for the time being without announcing the merge to the public. And so the CoD4 and TF2 teams were seen reverting to Brazen. The Defense of the Ancients team kept playing under the VG tag in the meantime and Shenks (tX Quake player) played Quake without a tag.

Venter continued to help out on the Vodacom Gaming Servers (VGS), but left in November 2009 after it became apparent that VGS had no intention of updating their server software and Venter had no access to this himself. Soon after VGS went dormant.

Behind the scenes the teams continued their work, hoping to step into the light once more under a new name (Ventus) and merge publicly when they got a new sponsor. Clans-SA boarded as a sponsor and supplied Ventus with its first website, and so 20 October saw Ventus reemerge on the World Wide Web (although kept quiet and unannounced). Various other organisations were also approached for sponsorship and soon after Ventus landed sponsorships from Web Africa, Samsung (in association with Rectron) and Coolermaster Taiwan.

In December Matthew "Cheezy" Bosch joined Ventus after discussion with him at the FIFA Roadshow.

During January 2010 Venter decided Ventus would be ready to launch fully in March 2010. He spoke to Stephen "Vitrolic" White about his decision, little knowing Brazen.Cod4 was planning their own future separately with Bravado Gaming. This unfortunate loss however did not change Ventus' readiness and so the launch date was left unchanged.

Anthony "scant" Hodgson was approached with the idea of recruiting the DotA team tankh. The deal was finalised very quickly and tankh was on board. Sakkie "RandomHero" Basson and his Heroes of Newerth team Kai were also approached and Venter was able to convince the team of the greater potential to be found with Ventus and the official recruitment took place later in April.

In February 2010 Venter contacted an old comrade, Flipi "alcardu" Portman, to help run Ventus. Venter was already busy planning future recruitments specifically teams for Counter-Strike and Call of Duty 4. Ventus soon found a viable option and contacted Connor "KING" Lamming, then captain of the Counter-Strike team Boondocks. Interest was shown, but soon after ulterior plans arose again as Connor left Boondocks to form a new team for Ventus. Connor had Dean "Hackem" Seyfried, Marchant "StripflOw" Laauwen, Jandrey "JiN" Venter and Marco "Lost" Fourie join with him and they formed Ventus.CS.

On the Quake Live front Robert "Draven" Szlanina and Mitchell "Szarko" Aleksandrov, aka Azul from team Corps, joined Henk "Shenks" Steyn aka Adrenalin in the Ventus.QL division. Draven was part of XploIT in 2008 but quit gaming for a few months and then came back when Quake Live replaced Quake 3.

March 2010 saw Ventus ready for launch with 6 divisions: CSS, DotA, HoN, QL, FIFA and Guitar Hero. Ventus launched on 28 March and went live on IRC that Sunday evening. On 29 March DoGaming and MyGaming ran articles on the launch. eGamer followed suit shortly after.

Within a week, Venter was approached by the Call of Duty 4 team known as Beastial to become the Ventus CoD4 Division. Discussions started and the team joined. An interview with the team captain, Tjaart "LiveR" Fourie, on 1 April and DoGaming covered the news that afternoon.

On 8 April 2010, a week later, Ventus went ahead and got another division, this time in the form of Warcraft 3. It was led by a former XploIT DotA player as well as editor of Ventus, Flipi "aclardu" Portman and also had another DotA player from the old XploIT organisation known as Samuel "ValpraX" Scott as well as his long-time friend and local legend, Caleb "ReaVeR" Ridley. DoGaming covered the news yet again.

Three weeks later, Ventus launched a new division in the form of Overclocking. This seat was yet again filled by a former XploIT DotA player, Goddy "Vivi" McRoodt. It was covered on the Ventus website as well as DoGaming.

== Achievements ==
=== Major tournaments ===
Ventus has placed in the top 10 at the following major tournaments:

==== Call of Duty Console ====
- 2nd Telkom DGL LAN Championships - 9 October 2016
- 2nd Telkom DGL LAN Championships - 11 October 2015

==== Call of Duty PC ====
- 1st Telkom DGL LAN Championships - R25,000 Cash Prize - 12 December 2010
- 2nd Telkom DGL Preliminary LAN Championships - R7,500 Cash Prize - 5 December 2010

==== Counter-Strike: Global Offensive ====
- 2nd Telkom DGL LAN Championships - 9 October 2016

==== Dota 2 ====
- 2nd Telkom DGL LAN Championships - 9 October 2016

==== League of Legends ====
- 1st Telkom DGL LAN Championships - 9 October 2016
- 2nd Telkom DGL LAN Championships - 11 October 2015

==== Overclocking ====
- 7th Gigabyte Open Overclocking Championships - 2010 - Goddy "Vivi" Roodt

==== Quake Live ====
- 3rd Arena77 Dreamhack Quake Live National Preliminaries - 2009

=== Minor tournaments ===
Ventus has placed in the top 3 at the following minor tournaments:

==== Call of Duty 4 ====
- 1st COD4ZA Crash Challenge - May 2011
- 2nd Telkom DGL Online League Leg 2 (Premier) - May 2011
- 1st COD4ZA Crossfire Challenge - April 2011
- 1st COD4ZA First Blood Community Cup - April 2011
- 1st Telkom DGL Online League Leg 1 (Premier) - March 2011
- 1st ESZ Intel Kick-Off League - November 2010
- 1st Telkom DGL Online League Leg 3 (1st Div) - June 2010
- 2nd Organised Chaos LAN (Cape Town) - May 2010
- 1st Telkom DGL Online League Leg 2 (2nd Div) - May 2010

==== Call of Duty: Black Ops ====
- 2nd NAG Gaming League - Easter Cup - April 2011
- 1st Telkom DO Gaming Online Championship - October 2014

==== Defense of the Ancients ====
- 1st Twilight League Season 3 - October 2010
- 2nd Organised Chaos LAN - September 2010
- 1st Twilight Cup - July 2010
- 1st Twilight League Season 2 - June 2010
- 1st Organised Chaos LAN (Cape Town) - May 2010
- 1st SynCidy Online Comp #2 - April 2010
- 1st SynCidy Online Comp #1 - March 2010
- 1st Twilight League Leg 1 - March 2010

==== Heroes of Newerth ====
- 1st Telkom DGL Online League Leg 4 - September 2010
- 1st Telkom DGL Online League Leg 3 - July 2010
- 3rd Extreme Professional League (XPL) - July 2010
- 2nd GameReplays.org Warm Up Tourney 2 - May 2010
- 3rd GameReplays.org Warm Up Tourney 1 - May 2010
- 1st Telkom DGL Online League Leg 2 - May 2010
- 1st Telkom DGL Online League Leg 1 - March 2010
- 1st WITS S2Games Tournament - March 2010

==== Overclocking ====
- 1st GOOC South African Qualifiers - April 2010

==== Quake Live ====
- 1st QL SprintCup - 30 May 2010 - Micele "Azul" Aleksandrov
- 2nd QL SprintCup - 30 May 2010 - Robert "Draven" Szlanina
- 1st QL SprintCup - 16 May 2010 - Micele "Azul" Aleksandrov
- 2nd QL SprintCup - 16 May 2010 - Robert "Draven" Szlanina
- 1st miNt Cup #1 - March 2010 - Micele "Azul" Aleksandrov

==== Starcraft 2 ====
- 1st Polarfluke Char Grilled - June 2011 - PandaTank
- 1st Polarfluke Muta Mayhem - May 2011 - PandaTank
- 2nd Polarfluke Muta Mayhem - May 2011 - Enjoy
- 2nd Polarfluke Mmmarch - March 2011 - Enjoy
- 3rd Polarfluke Love is in the Aiur - February 2011 - PandaTank
- 2nd DoGaming Online Championships - January 2011 - PandaTank
- 2nd Polarfluke ALL-IN - January 2011 - PandaTank
- 2nd Polarfluke Xmas - December 2010 - Valprax
- 1st Polarfluke: Heaven's Devils - September 2010 - AngryAfrican
- 1st Polarfluke: Released - August 2010 - AngryAfrican
- 4th Polarfluke: Released - August 2010 - Dreamer
- 2nd Megarom Invitational - July 2010 - AngryAfrican
- 2nd GoTime - July 2010 - AngryAfrican
- 1st The Fist #5 - July 2010 - Dreamer
- 1st FPPQQ Phase2 - July 2010 - Dreamer
- 1st The Fist #4 - June 2010 - Dreamer
- 1st The Fist #3 - June 2010 - Dreamer

==== Team Fortress 2 ====
- 1st TF2CSA v2 - March 2011
- 1st DoGaming TF2 Cup - March 2011

==== WarCraft 3 ====
- 1st Twilight Community Cup - March 2010 - Valprax
- 1st Kode5 National Preliminaries - March 2008 - ReaVeR
