= Darkest Powers =

Book series by Kelley Armstrong

- The Darkest Powers trilogy The Summoning (2008); The Awakening (2009); The Reckoning (2010) The Darkness Rising trilogy The Gathering (2011); The Calling (2012)
- Author: Kelley Armstrong
- Country: Canada
- Language: English
- Genre: Young Adult Fiction; Horror; Paranormal Romance; Urban Fantasy
- Publisher: HarperTeen
- Media type: Print (Hardcover, Paperback) e-Book (Kindle)

The Darkest Powers is a series of paranormal novels by Kelley Armstrong. The series revolves around The Edison Group, a team of supernatural scientists, and the subjects they have experimented on. The novels are divided into two trilogies. The Summoning, The Awakening, and The Reckoning comprise The Darkest Powers trilogy, which follows fifteen-year-old necromancer Chloe Saunders. The Gathering, The Calling, and The Rising comprise The Darkness Rising trilogy, which follows a sixteen-year-old girl named Maya Delaney.

== Darkest Powers series ==
=== The Darkest Powers trilogy ===
#	Title	Author	Publisher	Date	Length	ISBN
1	The Summoning	Kelley Armstrong	HarperCollins	July 2008	390 pp	978-0-06-166269-0
2	The Awakening	Kelley Armstrong	HarperCollins	April 2009	368 pp	978-0-06-166276-8
3	The Reckoning	Kelley Armstrong	HarperCollins	April 2010	391 pp	978-0-06-166283-6

=== The Darkness Rising trilogy ===
#	Title	Author	Publisher	Date	Length	ISBN
1	The Gathering	Kelley Armstrong	HarperCollins	April 2011	368 pp	978-0-06-179702-6
2	The Calling	Kelley Armstrong	HarperCollins	April 2012	326 pp	978-0-385-66854-5
3	The Rising	Kelley Armstrong	HarperCollins	April 2013	407 pp	978-0-385-66857-6

=== The Darkest Powers short stories ===
#	Title	Author	Date	Description
1	Dangerous*	Kelley Armstrong	-	(online, narrator: Derek)
Dangerous is about how Derek and Simon became residents of Lyle House
2	Kat	Kelley Armstrong	July 2009	(The Eternal Kiss, narrator: Katiana)
Kat is about Katiana. She is from another Edison Group experiment, the Valhalla Project.
3	Divided*	Kelley Armstrong	-	(online, narrator: Derek)
Divided is about what took place when Derek and Simon were separated from Chloe
4	Disenchanted*	Kelley Armstrong	-	(online, narrator: Tori, Simon)
Disenchanted is about what took place when Tori and Simon were separated from Chloe and Derek
5	Hunting Kat	Kelley Armstrong	August 2010	(Kisses from Hell, narrator: Katiana)
-
6	Belonging	Kelley Armstrong	May 2011	(online, narrator: Detective, Derek)
This story is about Dereks family coming back and claiming him.
7	Facing Facts	Kelley Armstrong	September 2011	Enthralled: Paranormal Division, narrator: Chloe)
This story takes place right after the reckoning where Tori learns that Kit is her actual father.

- Dangerous, Divided and Disenchanted are no longer available in the Edison Archives. In late September 2011, they will be released as a "Darkest Powers bonus pack." This will be available via eBook.

== Chronological Order of the Darkest Powers Series ==
- Dangerous
- Kat
1. The Summoning
  - Divided
2. The Awakening
  - Disenchanted
3. The Reckoning
  - Facing Facts
  - Hunting Kat
  - Belonging http://www.darkestpowers.com/2011/05/
4. The Gathering
5. The Calling
6. The Rising
  - Atoning http://www.kelleyarmstrong.com/free-online-fiction/

== See also ==
- Women of the Otherworld - Another Series by Kelley Armstrong
