= Marty Chan =

Canadian author and playwright (born 1965)

- Born: May 11, 1965 (age 61)
- Education: University of Alberta
- Spouse: Michelle Chan
- Writing career
- Language: English
- Genres: Children's Fiction, Young Adult Fiction
- Notable awards: Edmonton Book Prize

Chinese name
- Traditional Chinese: 陳澤桓
- Simplified Chinese: 陈泽桓
Transcriptions
Standard Mandarin
- Hanyu Pinyin: Chén Zéhuán
- Website: martychan.com

Marty Chan (born May 11, 1965) is a Chinese-Canadian author and playwright based in Edmonton, Alberta. His works include Something Dead And Evil Lurks In The Cemetery And It's My Dad, The Bone House, Maggie's Last Dance, Mom, Dad - I'm Living with a White Girl, and The Forbidden Phoenix. He is well known for his six-year run on CBC Radio of The Dim Sum Diaries, a series of short vignettes about his life growing up in small-town Northern Alberta as the only Chinese family around. His two children's novels, The Mystery of the Frozen Brains and The Mystery of the Graffiti Ghoul, were based on the same experiences.

He finished promoting his second children's book The Mystery of The Graffiti Ghoul, which is about Marty, a Chinese boy, trying to solve a mystery with his friend Remi. It has been nominated for a MYRCA (Manitoba Young Readers Choice Award), and has won the Diamond Willow Award. His third children's book The Mystery of the Mad Science Teacher is coming out soon. In March 2009 his new book, True Story, drew a book prize. He has visited many schools, and attended many events in Edmonton.

In October 2022, he released an audio drama titled Double Trouble based on the Chinese folk tale "The Magic Cask" as part of The Other Path audio drama podcast by Ottawa, Ontario theatre company Odyssey Theatre.

He graduated the University of Alberta with a Bachelor of Arts degree in 1989. He has received an Arts Achievement Award and a Performance Award from the City of Edmonton, for his contributions, such as serving as the Chair of the Edmonton Arts Council.
