= Lockstep (novel) =

2014 novel by Karl Schroeder

- Author: Karl Schroeder
- Illustrator: Cristian McGrath
- Language: English
- Genre: Science Fiction
- Published: 2014 (Tor Books)
- Publisher: Tor Books, Tor UK
- Publication date: March 25, 2014
- Publication place: United States
- Media type: Print (handcover), Print (paperback), Audiobook
- Pages: 352
- Award: Aurora Award for Best Young Adult Novel
- ISBN: 9781466833364

Lockstep is a young adult science fiction novel by Canadian author Karl Schroeder, released in March of 2014.

== Synopsis ==
Seventeen year old Toby Wyatt McGonigal enters technological hibernation as a last ditch effort to survive after realizing he is lost deep in space due to his ship to his family being off course, and wakes on a planet called Lowdown 14,000 years later. He learns that his brother Peter and sister Evayne took the once-single planet and created a vast universe-wide empire called Lockstep using their hibernation technology. This technology allows for planets all to be in sync, awake for one month and asleep without aging for decades, allowing for travel and trade between planets as a united empire. It is used as a method of control by the McGonigal siblings, they are able to punish civilizations by keeping them from hibernation, forcing them to age decades alone while the rest of the universe stays the same. Another technology is the automation that takes place during the hibernation cycles, the planets have robots and other technologies that interact with their worlds and prepare them for the next waking cycle, such as supplying food, repairing the environment, maintaining the world as they have known it

Toby is seen as a symbol upon his awakening, and must decide whether to embrace the power of the lockstep empire his siblings have created or fight against the control they have on their civilizations.

== Characters ==
Toby Wyatt McGonigal is the main protagonist of Lockstep as well as the story's narrator. He is the younger brother of Peter and Evayne McGonigal, the leaders and creators of the lockstep empire. He was set to inherit the empire from his father as the oldest sibling, but due to being missing, that role was taken by Peter. During the novel Toby is primarily seventeen, as he has been in hibernation for 14,000 years. Upon his awakening he is thrown into the unwilling role of 'the Emperor of Time' by the people of the lockstep, as his siblings have made him into a legend to use as a tool for control. He must decide if he wants this role or if he will become a revolutionary.

Corva Keishion is a woman about the same age as Toby, but born far after him and has lived her whole life in the lockstep empire. She and her family had been harmed by the McGonigals' control of lockstep's time cycles, having become separated by time and ages, the pain and desire to save her brother making her a revolutionary.

Peter McGonigal is the younger brother of Toby McGonigal and the Chairman of lockstep. Despite originally being younger than Toby, due to Toby's prolonged hibernation, he is now a middle aged man while Toby is still seventeen. He has a deep need for control that he exercises over the empire. He sees Toby as a threat to the control he has built and is deeply worried about the effect his return will have.

Evayne McGonigal is the younger sister of Toby and Peter McGonigal and is the leader of lockstep's religion, creating "The Cult of Toby." She maintains the empire's faith to prevent uprisings.

Cassandra McGonigal is the mother of Toby, Peter, and Evayne. She is the one who truly built the lockstep empire. She had decided when Toby went missing, after his ship went off course, to keep herself in hibernation, however she was then betrayed by Peter and Evayne who have kept her in hibernation ever since to keep her from interfering with their empire. She is also used by the siblings as a symbol to control the lockstep.

Orpheus is a creature known as a denner, they are genetically altered to be able to induce hibernation. He belongs to Toby, and is described to be similar in appearance to a ferret and cat.

== Reception ==
=== Awards ===
Lockstep was the 2015 winner of the Aurora Award for Best Young Adult Novel, an award given by members of the Canadian Science Fiction and Fantasy Association. Lockstep placed sixth in the 2015 Locus Awards for Young Adult Books, an award given by Locus, a digital magazine science fiction and fantasy news magazine]. Lockstep also was a preliminary nominee in 2015 Sunburst Award for Excellence in Canadian Literature of the Fantastic.

=== Reviews ===
A book review by Open Letters Monthly called Lockstep "Lean and hugely engaging... and highly recommended". Paul Di Filippo, reviewing the novel for Locus called Lockstep "enthralling and joyously adventuresome new novel."
