= Sun of Suns =

Book by Karl Schroeder

- First edition
- Author: Karl Schroeder
- Cover artist: Stephan Martinière
- Language: English
- Genre: Science fiction
- Publisher: Tor Books
- Publication date: October 2006
- Publication place: Canada
- Media type: Print (Paperback)
- Pages: 336
- ISBN: 0-7653-5453-5 (Paperback edition)
- Followed by: Queen of Candesce

Sun of Suns, Book One of Virga, is a science fiction novel by Karl Schroeder, published by Tor in 2006. It is set in the fictional world of Virga, a world devoid of gravity containing multiple artificial stars, a fullerene sphere filled with air, drifting rocks and nations floating around Candesce (the eponymous "Sun of Suns"). The story focuses around three main characters: Hayden Griffin, Admiral Chaison Fanning, and his wife Venera Fanning. The sequel to the book, Queen of Candesce, was released in August 2007.

== Plot ==
Hayden Griffin is a young, fatherless boy living in Aerie. Though exactly when or how his father died is never discovered, Hayden continually says that he was murdered by Slipstream, a rival nation migrating through Virga. Slipstream's sun is tethered to a migrating asteroid that has provided the nation with its wealth. As Slipstream follows its sun, it occasionally moves through other nation's territories, as it does with Aerie, Hayden Griffin's home nation. In these cases, it uses its military headed by a leader simply known as "the Pilot" to make this nation a client nation of Slipstream, only to leave these nations again when the asteroid moves far enough. His parents' ambition was to liberate Aerie from Slipstream's rule by constructing their own sun in secret. After his father's death, Hayden's mother made this her final goal in life. At the opening of the story, Aerie's sun is nearly finished, and the construction team was planning a test to assure of its functionality. Hayden gets out of his job as an apprentice in a kitchen, intending to watch the test from a jet bike. However, airships flying Slipstream's flag appear on the horizon and begin to attack the new sun. Aerie's resistance starts to defend themselves from the assault, but don't appear to be a true match against the highly trained Slipstreamers. In a suicidal last-ditch effort, Hayden's mother and the construction crew start the sun while inside of it, incinerating the ships attacking the sun itself but allowing at least one reported Slipstream ship to have escaped. During the fighting, Hayden is thrown off the town's spinning wheel and, as the first chapter leaves him, floating weightlessly in the darkness, where pirates call home and no suns or true governments have been established.

Years later, the story picks up again with Venera Fanning (wife of Admiral Chaison Fanning of Slipstream fame) and her page walking down the hall to the office of the Admiralty in Rush, capital of Slipstream. Venera reminisces on another times, years ago, when she was walking down this hall and a bullet ripped through her jaw line, and she was left bleeding on the floor with no one around. She enters the office, and then continues to the bathroom, where she holds a secret meeting with an informant and a few others. Bleeding and exhausted, the informant shows Venera pictures of a secret dock and ship building facility of a rival nation, Falcon Formation, in a sargasso, which is an area where there is a build up of toxic gases that no one can enter without a specially designed sargasso suit. One of the pictures shows a frightfully large dreadnought approximately 3 km in length, as well as many other warships. Venera leaves the meeting and returns to her waiting page. As they walk out of the crowded office, the page accidentally bumps into Venera, knocking the pictures out of her hands. Venera then catches the page staring at the pictures of the dreadnought as they collect them off the floor. After she dismisses it as awe, they step outside, when the page gives his approximation and explanation of the length of the dreadnought. After the page flies Venera back to the Fanning household, he curses himself for his failure to get inside the house, and the page is revealed to be Hayden Griffin, who intends to kill Admiral Fanning for revenge. However, Griffin learns that Fanning was not present in Slipstream's attack of Aerie.

Admiral Fanning is instructed by the Slipstream Pilot to move his fleet against Mavery but decides to divert part of the fleet including the ship Rook to attack the hidden Falcon Formation ship dock. Instead of moving there directly, Fanning decides to make a detour in order to recover the fabled treasure of Antene, the map to which is hidden in the Winding Tree of Fate artifact which, in turn, is stored in a station on Virga's skin.

On the Rook, Griffin learns that the ship's armorer, Aubri Mahallan, is from outside Virga. She explains that the outside world is governed by Artificial Nature, apparently an artificial intelligence possessing vast power. However, some systems of Candesce, Virga's largest sun, disrupt Artificial Nature and prevent it from entering Virga.

While passing icebergs that formed on the inside of Virga's skin, the fleet is attacked by winter pirates which are repelled by dislodging icebergs that then are drawn by gravity towards the center of Virga. During the fight, the Rook is boarded by pirates. Venera Fanning kills the Rook's captain and some of its crew as they try to scuttle the ship. Both Venera Fanning and Mahallan are taken prisoner by the pirate captain Dentius but regain control of the ship later.

After retrieving the Tree of Fate, Admiral Fanning reveals that the treasure of Antene includes the key to Candesce and therefore means to turn off Candesce's disruption systems. He intends to temporarily shut off these systems in order to use radar while fighting Falcon Formation's ships. Mahallan is building the radar units.

The treasure of Antene is located in Leaf's Choir, a sargasso near Gehellen. On the way, Mahallan explains to Griffin that Admiral Fanning had opposed the destruction of Aerie's sun. It was Slipstream's Pilot who led the attack, later presenting Fanning as the head behind it. Mahallan also explains that she was exiled to Virga because of her trying to overthrow Artificial Nature. Mahallan and Griffin become lovers.

Having retrieved the key to Candesce, Venera Fanning, Mahallan, and Griffin eventually gain control of the sun while Admiral Fanning fights Falcon Formation. Mahallan disables Candesce's countermeasures, enabling Fanning to hit Falcon Formation hard. However, he is forced to steer his ship into the Formation's dreadnought. In Candesce, it is revealed that Mahallan is wired by Artificial Nature, forcing her to keep the countermeasures down. This enables Artificial Nature to invade Virga. Fanning kills Mahallan and re-enables Candesce's countermeasures.

Griffin flees from Candesce which is about to re-ignite. He wants Fanning to accompany him but she declines, fearing that he wants to kill her as revenge for her killing his lover. At the last moment, she clings to Griffin's bike, to launch off it later after steering clear of the sun.

== Reception ==
Sun of Suns is a 2007 Aurora finalist and a Kirkus Best Book of 2006 . It was also nominated for the John W. Campbell Memorial award in 2007 .
