= Jonathan Strahan =

Northern Irish-born Australian editor and publisher

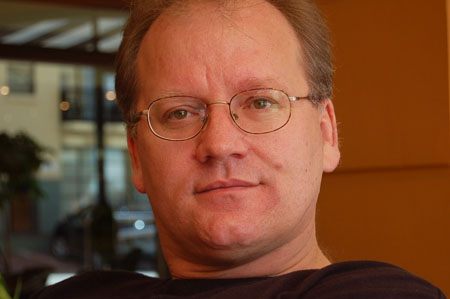
- Jonathan Strahan in 2007
- Born: January 1964 (age 62); Belfast, Northern Ireland, UK
- Occupations: Editor, critic, podcaster
- Writing career
- Period: 1991–present
- Genres: Science fiction; fantasy
- Website: jonathanstrahan.com.au

Jonathan Strahan (born January 1964, Belfast, Northern Ireland) is an editor and publisher of science fiction, fantasy, and horror. His family moved to Perth, Western Australia, in the late 1960s, and he graduated from the University of Western Australia with a Bachelor of Arts in 1985.

In 1990 he co-founded Eidolon: The Journal of Australian Science Fiction and Fantasy, and worked on it as co-editor and co-publisher until 1999. He was also co-publisher of Eidolon Books, which published Robin Pen's The Secret Life of Rubber-Suit Monsters, Howard Waldrop's Going Home Again, Storm Constantine's The Thorn Boy, and Terry Dowling's Blackwater Days.

In 1997 Strahan worked in Oakland, California, for Locus: The Newspaper of the Science Fiction Field as an assistant editor and wrote a regular review column for the magazine until March 1998, when he returned to Australia. In early 1999 Strahan resumed reviewing and copy-editing for Locus, which he continued until 2004, and was then promoted to reviews editor (January 2002–present). His reviews have also appeared in Eidolon and Foundation.

Strahan has won the William Atheling Jr. Award for Criticism or Review, a Ditmar Award for Best Professional Achievement, and the Peter McNamara Achievement Award. A twenty-seven-time Hugo Award nominee, Strahan won the World Fantasy Award (Special – Professional) in 2010 for his work as an editor, and 2024 for The Book of Witches. His anthologies have won the Locus Award for Best Anthology four times (2008, 2010, 2013, 2021) and the Aurealis Award for Best Anthology eight times.

As a freelance editor, Strahan has edited or co-edited more than sixty original and reprint anthologies and seventeen single-author story collections, which have been published in Australia, the United Kingdom, and the United States and translated into many languages. He has been a consulting fiction editor for Tor Books and Reactor since 2014, where he has acquired and edited three novels, twenty novellas, and a selection of short fiction.

In 1999, Strahan founded The Coode Street Press, which published the one-shot review zine The Coode Street Review of Science Fiction and co-published Terry Dowling's Antique Futures. The Coode Street Press is now inactive.

Strahan co-hosts the Coode Street Podcast with Gary K. Wolfe, which won the Hugo Award for Best Fancast in 2021 and has been nominated for the World Fantasy Special Award—Non-professional, BSFA Award for Best Long Non-Fiction, and Ditmar Award for Best Fan Publication in any Medium, and which has produced more than 700 episodes since May 2010.

Strahan married former Locus managing editor Marianne Jablon in 1999. They live in Perth with their two daughters.

== Selected works edited ==
- The Year's Best Australian Science Fiction and Fantasy: Volume 1 (with Jeremy G. Byrne), HarperCollins Publishers Australia, 1997
- The Year's Best Australian Science Fiction and Fantasy: Volume 2 (with Jeremy G. Byrne), HarperCollins Publishers Australia, 1998
- Science Fiction: Best of 2003 (with Karen Haber), ibooks, 2004
- The Locus Awards: Thirty Years of the Best in Fantasy and Science Fiction (with Charles N. Brown), HarperCollins Publishers Australia, 2004
- Best Short Novels: 2004, Bookspan/The Science Fiction Book Club, 2004
- Science Fiction: Best of 2004 (with Karen Haber), ibooks, 2005
- Fantasy: Best of 2004 (with Karen Haber), ibooks, 2005
- Best Short Novels: 2005, Bookspan/The Science Fiction Book Club, 2005
- Best Short Novels: 2006, Bookspan/The Science Fiction Book Club, 2006
- Science Fiction: The Very Best of 2005, Locus Press, 2006
- Fantasy: The Very Best of 2005, Locus Press, 2006
- Eidolon I (with Jeremy G. Byrne), Eidolon Books, 2006
- The Jack Vance Treasury (with Terry Dowling), Subterranean Press, 2007
- The Best Science Fiction and Fantasy of the Year: Volume 1, Night Shade Books, 2007
- Best Short Novels: 2007, Bookspan/The Science Fiction Book Club, 2007
- The New Space Opera (with Gardner Dozois), HarperCollins Publishers Australia, 2007
- Ascendancies: The Best of Bruce Sterling, Subterranean Press, 2007
- Eclipse One: New Science Fiction and Fantasy, Night Shade Books, 2007
- The Best Science Fiction and Fantasy of the Year: Volume 2, Night Shade Books, 2008
- The Starry Rift: Tales of New Tomorrows, Viking Penguin, 2008
- The Jack Vance Reader (with Terry Dowling), Subterranean Press, 2008
- Eclipse Two: New Science Fiction and Fantasy, Night Shade Books, 2008
- Wild Thyme, Green Magic: Stories by Jack Vance (with Terry Dowling), Subterranean Press, 2009
- The Best Science Fiction and Fantasy of the Year: Volume 3, Night Shade Books, 2009
- The New Space Opera 2 (with Gardner Dozois), HarperCollins Publishers, 2009
- Eclipse Three: New Science Fiction and Fantasy, Night Shade Books, 2009
- The Best Science Fiction and Fantasy of the Year: Volume 4, Night Shade Books, 2010
- Mirror Kingdoms: The Best of Peter S. Beagle, Subterranean Press, 2010
- Fritz Leiber: Selected Stories (with Charles N. Brown), Night Shade Books, 2010
- The Green Leopard Plague and Other Stories: Walter Jon Williams, Night Shade Books, 2010
- Hard Luck Diggings: The Early Jack Vance (with Terry Dowling), Subterranean Press, 2010
- Legends of Australian Fantasy (with Jack Dann), HarperCollins Publishers Australia, 2010
- Wings of Fire (with Marianne S. Jablon), Night Shade Books, 2010
- Swords and Dark Magic: The New Sword and Sorcery (with Lou Anders), Harper Eos, 2010
- The Best of Kim Stanley Robinson, Night Shade Books, 2010
- Godlike Machines, The Science Fiction Book Club, 2010
- The Best of Larry Niven, Subterranean Press, 2010
- Engineering Infinity, Solaris Books, 2010
- The Best Science Fiction and Fantasy of the Year: Volume 5, Night Shade Books, 2011
- Life on Mars: Tales from the New Frontier, Viking Books for Young Readers, 2011
- Eclipse Four: New Science Fiction and Fantasy, Night Shade Books, 2011
- Dangerous Ways: Selected Mysteries by Jack Vance (with Terry Dowling), Subterranean Press, 2011
- The Best Science Fiction and Fantasy of the Year: Volume 6, Night Shade Books, 2012
- Dream Castles: The Early Jack Vance Volume 2 (with Terry Dowling), Subterranean Press, 2012
- Under My Hat: Tales from the Cauldron, Random House Books for Young Readers, 2012
- Desperate Days: Selected Mysteries Volume 2: Jack Vance (with Terry Dowling), Subterranean Press, 2012
- Edge of Infinity, Solaris Books, 2012
- The Best of Joe Haldeman (with Gary K. Wolfe), Subterranean Press, 2013
- Magic Highways: The Early Jack Vance Volume 3 (with Terry Dowling), Subterranean Press, 2013
- The Best Science Fiction and Fantasy of the Year: Volume 7, Night Shade Books, 2013
- Fearsome Journeys: The New Solaris Book of Fantasy, Solaris Books, 2013
- The Best Science Fiction and Fantasy of the Year: Volume 8, Solaris Books, 2014
- Reach for Infinity, Solaris Books, 2014
- Fearsome Magics: The New Solaris Book of Fantasy, Solaris Books, 2014
- Grand Crusades: The Early Jack Vance Volume 5 (with Terry Dowling), Subterranean Press, 2015
- The Best Science Fiction and Fantasy of the Year: Volume 9, Solaris Books, 2015
- Meeting Infinity, Solaris Books, 2015
- The Best Science Fiction and Fantasy of the Year: Volume 10, Solaris Books, 2016
- Drowned Worlds, Solaris Books, 2016
- Beyond the Aquila Rift: The Best of Alastair Reynolds (with William Schafer), Subterranean Press, 2016
- Bridging Infinity, Solaris Books, 2016
- The Best Science Fiction and Fantasy of the Year: Volume 11, Solaris Books, 2017
- The Best Science Fiction and Fantasy of the Year: Volume 12, Solaris Books, 2018
- Infinity's End, Solaris Books, 2018
- Mission Critical, Solaris Books, 2019
- The Best of R.A. Lafferty, Gollancz, 2019
- The Best Science Fiction and Fantasy of the Year: Volume 13, Solaris Books, 2019
- Made to Order: Robots and Revolution, Solaris Books, 2020
- The Book of Dragons, Harper Voyager, 2020
- The Year's Best Science Fiction: The Saga Anthology of SF 2021, Saga Press, 2020
- The Year's Best Science Fiction: The Saga Anthology of SF 2022, Saga Press, 2021
- Someone in Time: Tales of Time-Crossed Romance, Solaris Books, 2022
- Tomorrow's Parties: Living in the Anthropocene, MIT Press, 2022
- The Book of Witches, Harper Voyager, 2023

== Eclipse Online ==
From October 2012 till March 2013 Strahan edited an online extension of his Eclipse anthology series. Eclipse Online featured the following stories:

- "Holmes Sherlock: A Hwarhath Mystery", Eleanor Arnason
- "Firebugs", Nina Kiriki Hoffman
- "One Room an Everywhere", K. J. Parker
- "The Contrary Gardner", Christopher Rowe
- "Invisible Men", Christopher Barzak
- "The Memcordist", Lavie Tidhar
- "The Amnesia Helmet", F. Brett Cox
- "The Advocate", Genevieve Valentine
- "On the Arrival of the Paddle-Steamer on the Docks of V—", Peter Ball
- "Sanctuary", Susan Palwick
- "In Metal, In Bone", An Owomoyela
- "Loss, with Chalk Diagrams", E. Lily Yu

Eclipse Online ceased publication when the publisher, Night Shade Books, was transferred to new ownership.

== Infinity Project of linked anthologies ==
1. Engineering Infinity (Solaris 2010)
2. Edge of Infinity (Solaris 2012)
3. Reach for Infinity (Solaris 2014)
4. Meeting Infinity (Solaris 2015)
5. Bridging Infinity (Solaris 2016)
6. Infinity Wars (Solaris 2017)
7. Infinity's End (Solaris 2018)

== Awards ==
Year	Nominated work	Award	Category	Result	Ref.
2005	—	Peter McNamara Achievement Award		Won	
2008	The New Space Opera	Locus Award	Best Anthology	Won	
2008	—	Hugo Award	Best Editor Short Form	Nominated	
2009	The Starry Rift	Aurealis Award	Best Anthology	Won	
2009	—	Hugo Award	Best Editor Short Form	Nominated	
2010	Eclipse Three	Aurealis Award	Best Anthology	Won	
2010	Eclipse Three	World Fantasy Award	Anthology	Nominated	
2010	—	World Fantasy Award	Special Award—Professional	Won	
2010	—	Hugo Award	Best Editor Short Form	Nominated	
2010	The New Space Opera 2	Locus Award	Best Anthology	Won	
2011	Swords & Dark Magic	World Fantasy Award	Anthology	Nominated	
2011	Wings of Fire	Aurealis Award	Best Anthology	Won	
2011	—	Hugo Award	Best Editor Short Form	Nominated	
2012	The Coode Street Podcast	Hugo Award	Best Fancast	Nominated	
2012	—	Hugo Award	Best Editor Short Form	Nominated	
2013	—	Hugo Award	Best Editor Short Form	Nominated	
2013	The Coode Street Podcast	Hugo Award	Best Fancast	Nominated	
2013	Edge of Infinity	Locus Award	Best Anthology	Won	
2013	The Best Science Fiction and Fantasy of the Year: Volume Six	Aurealis Award	Best Anthology	Won	
2013	Under My Hat: Tales from the Cauldron	World Fantasy Award	Anthology	Nominated	
2014	Fearsome Journeys	World Fantasy Award	Anthology	Nominated	
2014	The Coode Street Podcast	Hugo Award	Best Fancast	Nominated	
2014	—	Hugo Award	Best Editor Short Form	Nominated	
2017	The Coode Street Podcast	Hugo Award	Best Fancast	Nominated	
2017	—	Hugo Award	Best Editor Short Form	Nominated	
2018	The Coode Street Podcast	Hugo Award	Best Fancast	Nominated	
2018	—	Hugo Award	Best Editor Short Form	Nominated	
2018	Infinity Wars	Aurealis Award	Best Anthology	Won	
2019	The Best Science Fiction & Fantasy of the Year: Volume Twelve	Aurealis Award	Best Anthology	Won	
2019	The Coode Street Podcast	Hugo Award	Best Fancast	Nominated	
2020	Mission Critical	Aurealis Award	Best Anthology	Won	
2020	The Coode Street Podcast	World Fantasy Award	Special Award—Non-professional	Nominated	
2020	The Coode Street Podcast	Hugo Award	Best Fancast	Nominated	
2020	—	Hugo Award	Best Editor Short Form	Nominated	
2021	The Coode Street Podcast	Hugo Award	Best Fancast	Won	
2021	—	Hugo Award	Best Editor Short Form	Nominated	
2021	The Book of Dragons	World Fantasy Award	Anthology	Nominated	
