= Ventus (novel) =

2000 novel by Karl Schroeder

- Author: Karl Schroeder
- Language: English
- Genre: Science fiction
- Publisher: Tor Books
- Publication date: 2000
- Publication place: Canada
- Media type: Print (Paperback)
- Pages: 672
- ISBN: 0-8125-7635-7 (Paperback edition)
- OCLC: 48475768
- Followed by: Lady of Mazes (prequel)

Ventus is a 2000 science fiction novel by Karl Schroeder. It was Schroeder's debut solo novel, and introduced his concept of thalience. The novel was available for free under the Creative Commons license at Schroeder's website. Its prequel, Lady of Mazes, was published in 2005.

== Story ==
In preparation for the arrival of human colonists, the planet Ventus was seeded by an autonomous probe with a suite of terraforming nanotechnology. To coordinate the terraforming effort, advanced AIs called “Winds” were created. Using raw materials from the planet, the Winds slowly changed the planet’s atmosphere and soil, transforming it from a lifeless, poisonous world to a veritable garden, with pre-built cities and mansions ready for their human masters to arrive. The Winds toiled away over the years, maintaining the fragile artificial ecosystem of Ventus – without their efforts, the planet’s livable environment would degrade and become poisonous once more.

Centuries later, the colonists arrive to populate the planet. But something has gone wrong: the Winds no longer recognize mankind, and begin attacking all human ships and technology as threats to the precarious ecosystem. Individual people, seen by the Winds as simply “wildlife” (and thus part of the ecosystem) are left alone, but all their technology is destroyed, leaving them helpless.

Fast-forward to the present, where the descendants of the colonists live in ignorance of their past, existing in a perpetual pre-industrial state. Seeing the Winds as capricious gods who destroy anything and anyone who advances technology too much, the people have reverted to superstitious monarchies and aristocracies. Ventusians simply see themselves as living in a world filled with magic, and live their lives in awe and fear of the Winds.

In the rest of the galaxy humanity has other problems. A gargantuan war between AI’s is fought, between the “Archipelago” (representing the bulk of humanity) and the malicious “3340” (described in detail in the prequel Lady of Mazes). Ultimately, 3340 is destroyed, but not before it sends “Resurrection Seeds” of itself throughout the galaxy. The Archipelago starts a long process of tracking these Seeds down, lest 3340 rebuild itself anew.

One of these Seeds has landed on Ventus, in the form of former demigod Armiger. Packed with nanotechnology, Armiger secretly installs implants in several unknowing humans around the planet, in an effort to reconnoiter the Winds. He begins a campaign of warfare, intending to first take over the human population, and then attack the Winds head-on, but inadvertently alerts the Winds when he uses forbidden technology during a battle and is subsequently destroyed by them. Entombed by his former soldiers, his nanotech slowly pieces him back together.

A young adolescent named Jordan Mason begins having visions of being Armiger, seeing and hearing everything that Armiger does. Frightened by what is happening to him, Jordan runs away from home. He is soon intercepted by the mysterious Calandria May, who, unbeknownst to Jordan, has been sent by the Archipelago to Ventus to track down Armiger. Along with her partner Axel, Calandria intends to use Jordan to get to Armiger.

The novel explores the mystery of why the Winds have rejected humanity, and also explores the themes of Platonic Ideals and identity.

== Reception ==
Kirkus Reviews gave a positive review, praising the plot, and concluded that the novel was "delightful and engaging, both intellectually and viscerally: a superb achievement."
