= Christopher Rowe (author) =

American author

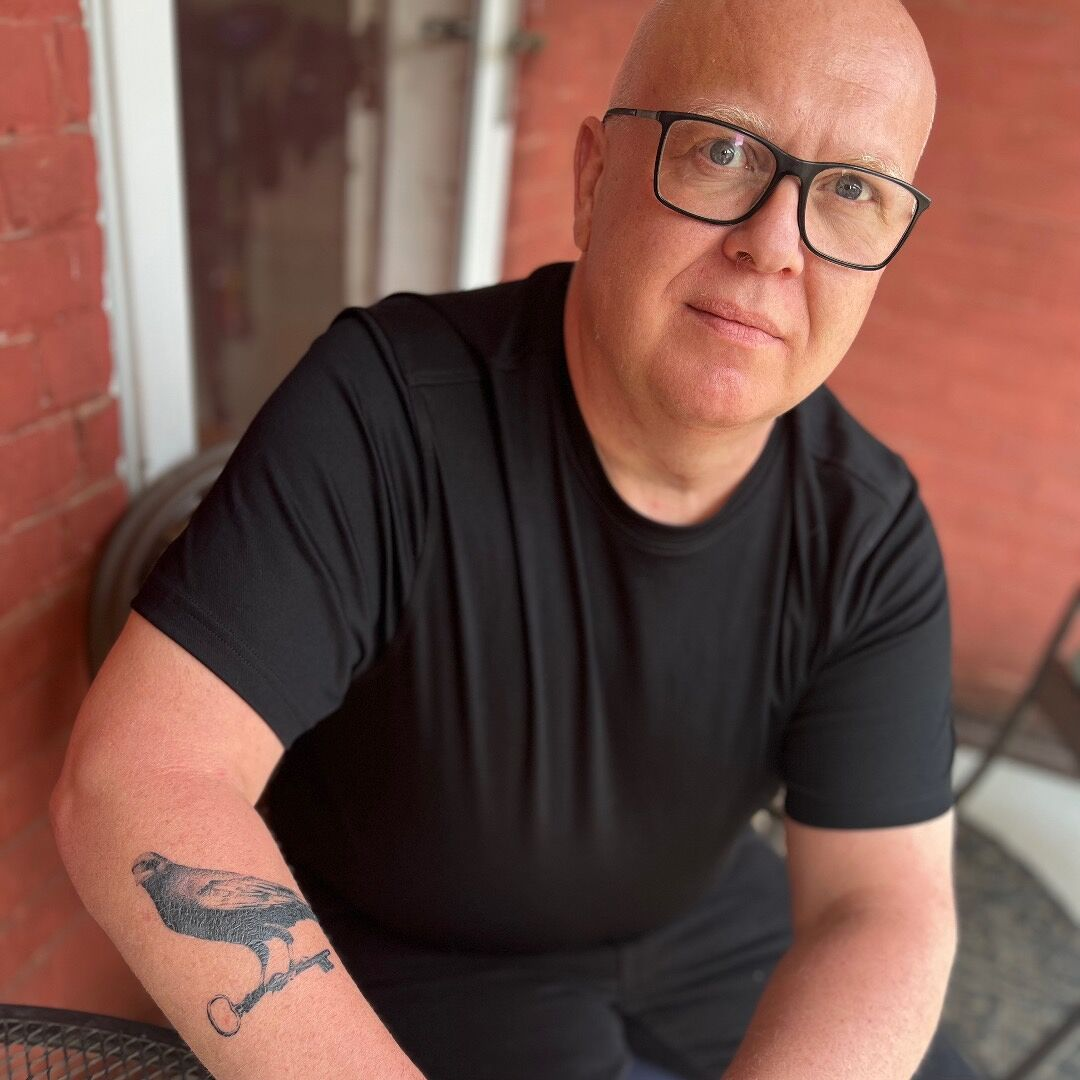
- Born: December 25, 1969 (age 56); Columbia, Kentucky, US

Christopher Rowe (born December 25, 1969) is an American science fiction and fantasy writer, whose stories have been finalists for the Hugo Award, the Nebula Award, the Theodore Sturgeon Memorial Award, and the World Fantasy Award.

== Career ==
Rowe's first professionally published short story was "Kin to Crows" (Realms of Fantasy, 1998). His best-known story is "The Voluntary State" (Sci Fiction, 2004), which was nominated for multiple major awards. That story was followed by two sequels: "The Border State" (2017) and These Prisoning Hills (2022).

His 2017 short-story collection Telling the Map received positive reviews from Publishers Weekly ("wild creativity, haunting imagery, and lyricism"), Kirkus Reviews (a "clutch of complex, persuasive visions of an alternate South"), and Tor.com ("a stellar set of stories that mesh well together").

== Personal life ==
He lives in Adair County, Kentucky. He was married to fellow author Gwenda Bond, with whom he co-authored The Supernormal Sleuthing Service book series, from 2004 to 2023.

== Bibliography ==
=== Short fiction ===
Collections

- Rowe, Christopher (2017). Telling the map.

Stories (Note: Short stories unless otherwise noted.)

| Title | Year | First published | Reprinted/collected | Notes |
|---|---|---|---|---|
| Kin to crows | 1998 | Realms of Fantasy | | |
| The Voluntary State | 2004 | Sci Fiction | The Year's Best Science Fiction: Twenty-Second Annual Collection (ed. Gardner Dozois) | |
| The unveiling | 2015 | Rowe, Christopher (January 2015). "The unveiling". Asimov's Science Fiction. 39 (1): 14–21. | | |
| The Border State | 2017 | | | Sequel to "The Voluntary State" |
| Knowledgeable Creatures | 2019 | Christopher Rowe. "Knowledgeable Creatures". Tor.com Original Fiction. | The Year's Best Science Fiction and Fantasy 2020 (ed. Rich Horton) | |
| These Prisoning Hills | 2022 | | | Novella; sequel to "The Voluntary State" and "The Border State" |
| The Navigating Fox | 2023 | | | Novella; set in the same milieu as "Knowledgeable Creatures" |

———————
