= Karl Schroeder =

Canadian science fiction writer

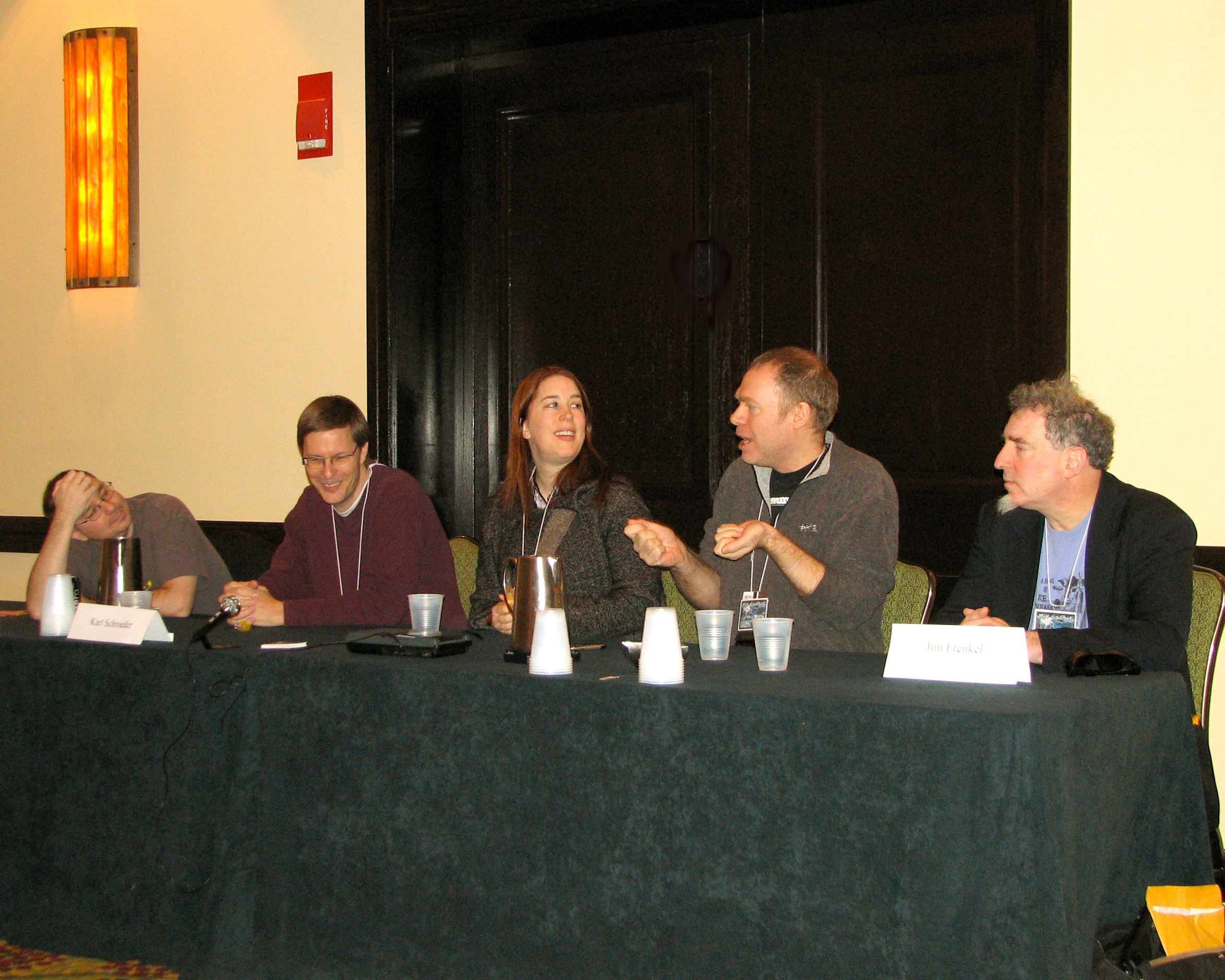
- Karl Schroeder (second from left) on a panel at ConFusion 2008
- Born: September 4, 1962 (age 64); Brandon, Manitoba, Canada
- Occupations: Author, technology consultant
- Writing career
- Genre: Science fiction
- Notable works: Ventus, Permanence
- Website: kschroeder.com

Karl Schroeder (/ˈʃreɪdər/) (born September 4, 1962) is a Canadian science fiction author and futurist. His novels present far-future speculations on topics such as nanotechnology, terraforming, augmented reality, and interstellar travel, and are deeply philosophical. More recently he also focuses on near-future topics. Several of his short stories feature the character Gennady Malianov.

== Biography ==
Schroeder was born in a Mennonite family in Brandon, Manitoba. In 1986, he moved to Toronto, where he now lives with his wife Janice Beitel and daughter. After publishing a dozen short stories, Schroeder published his first novel, Ventus, in 2000. A prequel to Ventus, Lady of Mazes, was published in 2005. He has published seven more novels and is co-author (with Cory Doctorow) of the self-help book The Complete Idiot's Guide to Publishing Science Fiction. Schroeder currently writes, consults in the area of futures studies.

In October 2011, Karl Schroeder was awarded a Master of Design degree in Strategic Foresight and Innovation from OCAD University in Toronto, Ontario, Canada.

== Awards ==
- 1982. Pierian Spring Best Story award for The Great Worm.
- 1989. Context '89 fiction contest winner for The Cold Convergence.
- 1993. Prix Aurora Award for Best Short Work in English for The Toy Mill.
- 2001. New York Times Notable book for Ventus.
- 2003. Prix Aurora Award for best Canadian SF novel for Permanence.
- 2006/2007: Sun of Suns: Kirkus Best Book of 2006, 2007 Aurora finalist, 2007 nomination for the John W. Campbell Memorial award
- 2012. Audie Award for best Original Work for METAtropolis: Cascadia, a shared-world audiobook anthology in which Schroeder's contribution was the short story Deodand.
- Lockstep was the 2015 winner of the Aurora Award for Best Young Adult Novel.

== Selected bibliography ==
=== Stand-alone ===
- The Claus Effect (with David Nickle). (Tesseract Books, 1997) ISBN 978-1-895836-35-6
- Permanence (Tor Books, 2002.) ISBN 0-7653-0371-X
- Crisis in Zefra (Directorate of Land Strategic Concepts, National Defence Canada; 2005.) ISBN 978-0-662-40643-3
- Lockstep (Tor Books, 2014.) ISBN 978-0-7653-3726-9
- Jubilee, 2014
- The Million, 2018
- Stealing Worlds, 2019

=== Ventus ===
- Ventus (Tor Books, 2000) ISBN 978-0-312-87197-0
- Lady of Mazes (prequel to Ventus) (Tor Books, 2005) ISBN 978-0-7653-5078-7

=== Virga ===
- Sun of Suns (Tor Books, 2006.) ISBN 978-0765354532
- Queen of Candesce (Tor Books, 2007.) ISBN 978-0765315441
- Pirate Sun (Tor Books, 2008.) ISBN 978-0765315458
- The Sunless Countries (Tor Books, 2009.) ISBN 978-0765320766
- Ashes of Candesce (Tor Books, 2012.) ISBN 978-0765324924
