= List of urban fantasy novels =

This is a list of novels in the urban fantasy genre.

== Youth ==
Series/title	Author	# of novels	Publication	Series status	Comments
Mary Poppins	P. L. Travers	8	1934-88	completed	London
Mr. Wilmer	Robert Lawson	1	1945	completed	New York City
Stuart Little	E. B. White	1	1945	completed	New York City
Twenty-One Balloons	William Pène du Bois	1	1947	completed	SF-London
The Fabulous Flight	Robert Lawson	1	1949	completed	New York City
The Borrowers	Mary Norton	5	1952-82	completed	Leighton Buzzard
Tales of Magic	Edward Eager	7	1954-62	completed	Suburban CT
Charlie books	Roald Dahl	2	1964, 1972	completed	unspecified location
Sally Lockhart	Philip Pullman	3	1985-94	completed	London
Harry Potter	J.K. Rowling	7	1995-2007	completed	Great Britain
Percy Jackson	Rick Riordan	5	2005-09	completed	several related books
Dragons in a Bag	Zetta Elliott	3	2018-2022	completed	Brooklyn

== Young adult ==
Series/title	Author	# of novels	Publication dates	Series status	Comments
Chronicles of Kazam series	Jasper Fforde	4	2010-2015		
His Dark Materials	Philip Pullman	3	1995-2000	completed	
The Darkest Powers trilogy	Kelley Armstrong	3	2008-2010	completed	
Darklight series	Darynda Jones	3	2012-2013		
The Darkness Rising trilogy	Kelley Armstrong	3	2011-2013	completed	
The Iron Fey	Julie Kagawa	8	2010-2015		
The Mortal Instruments	Cassandra Clare	6	2007-2014	completed	
The Blue Girl	Charles de Lint	1	2004	completed	
Need	Carrie Jones	4	2008-2012	completed	
Skulduggery Pleasant series	Derek Landy	9	2007-2014	completed	
Twilight series	Stephenie Meyer	4	2005-2008	completed	
Vampire Academy	Richelle Mead	6	2007-2010	completed	

== Adult ==
Abbreviations used:

- P.I.: Private Investigator
- PR: paranormal romance
- SciFi: science fiction
- GBLT: gay/lesbian/bisexual/transgender

Series/title	Author	Novel count	Years	Series status	Supernatural species	Location	Genres	Comments
Agent of Hel trilogy	Jacqueline Carey	3	2012-2015	completed	Goddess, fairies, werewolves	Pemkowet, fictional small American town		
Alex Craft series	Kalayna Price	5	2010-	ongoing	Ghosts, Fae	Nekros City		
Alex Verus series	Benedict Jacka	11	2012-	ongoing	Wizards, magical creatures	London		
All Souls Trilogy	Deborah Harkness	3	2011-2014	complete	Witches, vampires	Oxford, England		
Allie Beckstrom series	Devon Monk	9	2008-2012			Portland, OR		
Alpha & Omega series	Patricia Briggs	6	2007-	ongoing	Werewolf, fae		PR	
American Gods series	Neil Gaiman	2	2001-		Gods			
Anita Blake: Vampire Hunter series	Laurell K. Hamilton	28	1993-	ongoing	Vampires, werewolves		PR	
Anna Strong Chronicles	Jeanne C. Stein	9	2006-2013		Vampires		PR	
Black London series	Caitlin Kittredge	6	2009-2013					
The Black Sun's Daughter series	M.L.N. Hanover	5	2008-2013					
Bobby Dollar series	Tad Williams	3	2012-	ongoing	Angels, demons, demonic creatures			
Boundary Magic series	Melissa F. Olson	3	2015-	ongoing	Vampires, witches, werewolves			
Broken Magic series	Devon Monk	2	2013-2014			Portland, OR		
Cal Leandros series	Rob Thurman	10	2006-2015					
The Cassandra Palmer series	Karen Chance	10	2006-	ongoing	Mages, vampires			
Charlie Madigan series	Kelly Gay	4	2009-2012					
Charley Davidson series	Darynda Jones	13	2011-	ongoing	Grim Reaper, demons		PR	
Chicagoland Vampires series	Chloe Neill	13	2009-2014	completed	Vampires, shape shifters, witches			
Coyote Blue	Christopher Moore	1	2004	stand-alone	Coyote god	Las Vegas, NV	Comedy	
Dante Valentine series	Lilith Saintcrow	5	2005-2008		Magical humans, demons, vampires, werewolves		PR	
Dark Angel series	Keri Arthur	7	2011-		Angels, vampires			
Dark Swan series	Richelle Mead	4	2008-2011		Fae		PR	
The Disillusionists series	Carolyn Crane	3	2010-2011		Magical humans			
Dorina Basarab series	Karen Chance	3	2008-2012	ongoing	Vampires, mages			
Downside Ghosts series	Stacia Kane	5	2010-2012		Ghosts			
Dracula	Bram Stoker	1	1897		Vampires	London, England	PR	
The Dresden Files	Jim Butcher	17	2000-	ongoing	Wizards, Fae/Sidhe, Vampires, Ghosts, Werewolves	Chicago	P.I.	
The Edge Series	Ilona Andrews	4	2009-2012					
Edge	Melinda M. Snodgrass	2						
Elfhome series	Wen Spencer	5	2003-2014	ongoing	Elves	Pittsburgh, PA		
Enchantment Emporium	Tanya Huff	3	2009-2014	completed		Canada		
Fangborn series	Dana Cameron	2	2013-2014					
Fever series	Karen Marie Moning	11	2006-	ongoing	Fae	Ireland		
Garrett P.I.	Glen Cook	14	1988-2013		Vampires, trolls, centaurs, gods, ghosts, &c.	Tunfaire	PI	
Georgina Kincaid series	Richelle Mead	6	2007-2011	completed	Succubus, demons, angels, vampires		PR	
Greywalker series	Kat Richardson	9	2006-2014	completed	Greywalker, witches, vampires	Seattle, WA	Detective	
Grim Reaper series	Christopher Moore	2	2006-2015		Grim Reaper, ghosts	San Francisco, CA	Comedy	
Grimnoir Chronicles series	Larry Correia	3	2011-2013	completed	Magical humans, demons	USA		
Guild Hunters series	Nalini Singh	6	2009-2013					
Half-Moon Hollow series	Molly Harper	5	2012-		Vampires, witches, shape-shifters	Small town in Kentucky	PR	
Heartstrikers series	Rachel Aaron	2	2014-	ongoing	Dragons, spirits	Detroit	Post-apocalypse	
The Hollows (Rachel Morgan) series	Kim Harrison	15	2004-	ongoing	Witches, demons, werewolves, vampires, pixies, faeries	Cincinnati, OH		
House Immortal series	Devon Monk	3	2014-					
House of Comarré	Kristen Painter	5	2011-2013		Vampires, fae, shape-shifters, ghosts			
InCryptid series	Seanan McGuire	10	2012-	ongoing	Supernatural non-human creatures	New York City, Ohio, Australia		
Indexing series	Seanan McGuire	2	2012-		Fairytale creatures			
The Iron Druid Chronicles series	Kevin Hearne	9	2011-	ongoing	Druids, fae, vampires, werewolves, gods			
Jane Jameson series	Molly Harper	4	2019-2012	completed	Vampires, shape-shifters	Small town in Kentucky	PR	
Jane True series	Nicole D. Peeler	6	2009-2013	ongoing	Fae-like humanoids			
Jane Yellowrock series	Faith Hunter	6	2009-	ongoing	Skinwalkers, vampires, weres			
Jaz Parks series	Jennifer Rardin	8	2007-2011					
Jill Kismet series	Lilith Saintcrow	6	2008-2011	Completed	Hellbreed, Sorrows, Scurf, weres			
The Jinni series	Nicole D. Peeler	1	2015				PR	
Joe Pitt series	Charlie Huston	5	2005-2009	completed	Vampires			
John Justin Mallory Mystery series	Mike Resnick	3	1987-2009					
Kate Daniels series	Ilona Andrews	10	2007-2018	completed	Mages, witches, weres, gods		Post-apocalypse, PR	
Keeper Chronicles	Tanya Huff	3	1998-2003	completed	Keepers, imps, cats	Canada		
Kitty Norville series	Carrie Vaughn	14	2005-2015	completed	Weres, vampires, gods	Denver, CO		
Magic 2.0 series	Scott Meyer	3	2013-		Wizards	England		
Magic Ex Libris series	Jim C. Hines	2	2012-2013	ongoing	Magical humans, vampires, magic-created creatures			
The Magicians series	Lev Grossman	3	2009-2014	completed	Magicians, magic creatures			
Marla Mason series	Tim Pratt	10	2009-2017		Sorcerers, gods	San Francisco, CA; fictional city on the US East Coast		
Mercy Thompson series	Patricia Briggs	12	2006-	ongoing	Shape-shifters, werewolves, witches, fae	Tri-Cities, Washington		
Merry Gentry series	Laurell K. Hamilton	9	2000-2014		Fae			
Midgard series	Susan Krinard	2						
Miriam Black series	Chuck Wendig	3	2012-2013	ongoing	Clairvoyants			
Monster Hunter International series	Larry Correia	8	2007-	ongoing	Vampires, supernatural monsters			
Mookie Pearl	Chuck Wendig	2	2013-		Goblins, nagas, underworld creatures	New York city		
Neverwhere	Neil Gaiman	1	1996	stand-alone				Novelization of Neverwhere TV series
Newford stories	Charles de Lint	24	1990-2021	ongoing	beings from European & Native American mythology	fictional Canadian city (Ottawa?)		
Night Huntress series	Jeaniene Frost	7	2007-2014		Vampires			
Nightside	Simon R. Green	13	2003-2012	completed	Magical humans, demons, angels, gods, monsters	Nightside (parallel to London)		
October Daye series	Seanan McGuire	15	2009-	ongoing	Fae/Sidhe	San Francisco Bay Area		
Ordinary Magic series	Devon Monk	3	2016-			Ordinary (fictional town), Oregon, USA		
The Others series	Anne Bishop	2	2013-2014	ongoing	Precognate, shape-shifting and elemental non-human	Similar to east coast of USA		
Outcast Season series	Rachel Caine	4	2009-2012		Magical humans, jinn			
Parasol Protectorate series	Gail Carriger	5	2009-2012					
Prospero's War series	Jaye Wells	2	2014	Ongoing	Magical adepts			
Retrievers series	Laura Anne Gilman	6	2004-2009		Mages, demons			
Rivers of London series, aka Peter Grant series	Ben Aaronovitch	8	2011-	ongoing	Magical humans, ghosts, gods	London		
Rogue Mage series	Faith Hunter	3	2004-2007	completed	Mage, seraphim		Post-apocalypse	
Sabina Kane series	Jaye Wells	5	2009-2012	ongoing	Vampires, mages			
Sandman Slim series	Richard Kadrey	6	2002-	ongoing	Magicians, vampires, demons, angels	Los Angeles, CA		
Scarlett Bernard series	Melissa F. Olson	3	2012-2014		Vampires, witches, werewolves			
Secret History	Simon R. Green	12	2007-2018		Magical humans			
Shadows Fall	Simon R. Green	1	1994	stand-alone				
Shadowspawn	S.M. Stirling	3						
Shame and Terric series	Devon Monk	1	2015-			Portland, OR		
Shifters series	Rachel Vincent	6	2007-2010	completed	Werecat			
Signs of the Zodiac	Vicki Pettersson							
Simon Canderous series	Anton Strout	4	2008-2011					
Southern Witch series	Kimberly Frost	5	2009-		Witches, werewolves, vampires	Texas		
The Southern Vampire Mysteries series (The Sookie Stackhouse Novels)	Charlaine Harris	13	2001-2013	completed	Vampires			
Special Circumstances series	John Ringo	2	2006-	ongoing	Demons	Southern USA		
Strange Angels	Lilith Saintcrow	5	2009-2011					
Tristopolis series	John Meaney	4	2007-	ongoing	Zombies, wraiths, gargoyles, mages, witches		PR	
Twenty Palaces series	Harry Connolly	3	2009-2011	canceled				
Vicki Nelson series	Tanya Huff	5	1991-1997	completed				
The Walker Papers series	C. E. Murphy	9	2005-2014	completed	Shaman, gods, witches	Seattle, WA		
Watch series	Sergei Lukyanenko	5	1998-2012	completed				
