= Alesia Holliday =

American author

- Education: Barnesville High School; Ohio State University; Capital University Law School (JD)
- Occupation: Author
- Writing career
- Pen name: Alyssa Day; Jax Abbott
- Notable work: The Naked Truth about Guys
- Notable awards: RITA award – Romance Novella; 2006 The Naked Truth about Guys in The Naked Truth
- Website: alyssaday.com

Alesia Marie Holliday is an American author who writes under own name as well as the pseudonyms Alyssa Day and Jax Abbott. She won a RITA Award, given by the Romance Writers of America for excellence in romantic fiction.

== Early life and education ==
Alesia Marie Holliday was raised in Barnesville, Ohio, and graduated from Barnesville High School in 1981. She earned degrees from Ohio State University and Capital University Law School (J.D., 1995).

== Writing career ==
While working as a trial lawyer, she began writing. In 2003, Holliday published a memoir, eMail to the Front, of her correspondence with her husband while he was deployed with the United States Navy.

Her first novel, a chick lit book called American Idle, was published in 2004. The book launched Dorchester's making It imprint. Publishers Weekly described it as "zany" and "humorous." Holliday says that her fiction writing style influenced her legal briefs, with one judge telling her "‘I love when you come before me, because your briefs are always so entertaining'". To the surprise of her law colleagues, who considered her writing a hobby, Holliday soon quit law to write full-time.

Holliday writes in multiple genres using multiple pseudonyms. Under her own name, she has written romantic comedies and mysteries. As Jax Abbott, she writes YA novels. As Alyssa Day, she writes paranormal romance.

== Bibliography ==
=== Writing as Alesia Holliday ===
==== Contemporary romance ====
- American Idle (also in Spring Fling)
- Santa Baby
- The Naked Truth About Guys
- 7 Ways To Lose Your Lover
- Blondes Have More Felons

=== Writing as Jax Abbott ===
==== Teen novels ====
- Super Hero Prom
- Super Hero Sweet 16

=== Writing as Lucy Connors ===
Author is no longer using the pseudonym Lucy Connors

==== Teen novels ====
- The Lonesome Young

=== Writing as Alyssa Day ===
==== Non-fiction ====
- E-Mail To The Front

==== Poseidon's Warriors series ====
#	Title	Date Published	Also In
0.1	Halloween In Atlantis	Oct 2016	
0.2	Christmas In Atlantis	Dec 2016	Christmas After Dark
1	January In Atlantis	Jan 2018	My Paranormal Valentine
2	February In Atlantis	Mar 2018	February and March in Atlantis
3	March In Atlantis	Sep 2018	February and March in Atlantis
4	April In Atlantis	Nov 2018	
5	May In Atlantis	Sep 2019	
6	June In Atlantis	Dec 2020	
7	July In Atlantis	?	
8	August In Atlantis	?	
9	October In Atlantis	?	
10	November In Atlantis	?	
11	December In Atlantis	?	

==== Warriors of Poseidon series ====
Related to Poseidon's Warriors

#	US Title	UK Title and Overseas	Date Published	Also In
1	Atlantis Rising	Conlan	Mar 2007	
1.5	Wild Hearts In Atlantis	Bastien	May 2007	Wild Thing
2	Atlantis Awakening	Vengeance	Nov 2007	
2.5	Shifter's Lady	Ethan	Mar 2008	Shifter
3	Atlantis Unleashed	Justice	Jun 2009	
4	Atlantis Unmasked	Alexios	Jul 2009	
5	Atlantis Redeemed	Brennan	Mar 2010	
6	Atlantis Betrayed	Christophe	Sep 2010	
7	Vampire In Atlantis	Daniel	Jun 2011	
8	Heart Of Atlantis	Alaric	Dec 2012	

==== Cardinal Witches series ====
1. Alejandro's Sorceress (also in Dark and Deadly)
2. William's Witch (also in Taming The Vampire Anthology)
3. Damon's Enchantress
4. Jake's Djinn (also in Second Chances)

==== Tiger's Eye Mysteries series ====
Author estimates this series will include 12 books

#	Title	Date Published	Also In
0.5	Travelling Eye	Mar 2016	Red Sole Clues Tiger's Eye Mysteries Volume 1
1	Dead Eye	Dec 2015	Tiger's Eye Mysteries Volume 1
2	Private Eye	Apr 2016	Tiger's Eye Mysteries Volume 1
3	Evil Eye	Mar 2019	
4	Eye of Danger	Aug 2019	
5	Eye of the Storm	Sep 2019	
6	A Dead End Christmas	Mar 2020	
7	Apple of My Eye	2020?	
8	Blink of an Eye	2020?	
9	Eagle Eye	2020?	

==== League of the Black Swan series ====
#	Title	Date Published	Also In	Comments
1	The Cursed	May 2013		
1.5	Curse Of The Black Swan	Jul 2013	Enthralled	
2	The Treasured	?		formerly named The Unforgiven

==== Vampire Motorcycle Club ====
1. Bane's Choice

=== Anthologies and collections ===
Anthology or Collection	Contents	Publication Date	With	Comments
Wild Thing	Wild Hearts in Atlantis	May 2007	Maggie Shayne Marjorie M. Liu Meljean Brook	
Shifter	Shifter's Lady	Mar 2008	Angela Knight Lora Leigh Virginia Kantra	
The Mammoth Book of Paranormal Romance	The Princess and the Peas	Apr 2009	Trisha Telep Ilona Andrews Kelley Armstrong Anya Bast Meljean Brook et al.	
Enthralled	The Curse of the Black Swan	Jul 2013	Lora Leigh Meljean Brook Lucy Monroe	
I Never Thought I'd See You Again	Persephone's Granddaughter	Jan 2013	Lou Aronica Allison Brennan Mary Hart Perry C.B. Pratt	
Dark and Deadly	Alejandro's Sorceress	Apr 2014	Jennifer Ashley Felicity Heaton Erin Kellison Laurie London Erin Quinn	
Random: A Short Story Collection	The Princess and the Peas Persephone's Granddaughter Suzi Steletto: Recovering Demon Slayer Suzi Steletto and the Giblet of Fire Last Dance	July 2014		
Spring Fling	American Idol	May 2015	Lori Handeland Stephanie Julian Aliyah Burke Eileen Rendahl	
Red Sole Clues	Traveler's Eye	Mar 2016	Liliana Hart Adrienne Giordano Lori Ryan Marquita Valentine	later renamed Travelling Eye
Taming The Vampire Anthology	William's Witch	Oct 2016	Mandy M. Roth Michelle M. Pillow Kristen Painter Yasmine Galenorn Colleen Gleason Jennifer Ashley	
Second Chances: A Romance Writers of America Collection	Jake's Djinn	Sep 2017	J. Kenner Tina Ferraro Christina Lauren Brandi Willis Schreiber et al.	
Tiger's Eye Mysteries Volume 1	Travelling Eye Dead Eye Private Eye	May 2018		was Traveler's Eye
February and March in Atlantis	February in Atlantis March in Atlantis	Oct 2018		
My Paranormal Valentine	January in Atlantis	Jan 2019	Lisa Kessler Renee George Abigail Owen Debra Dunbar Robyn Peterman Michelle M. Pillow	
Christmas After Dark	Christmas in Atlantis	Nov 2019	Juliette Cross Abigail Owen Lisa Kessler Nina Croft Sheryl Nantus	

== Personal ==
Holliday's first two marriages were brief, ending in divorce. She was married to Michael D. Melching from June 16, 1985 to February 6, 1987. Holliday married Patrick R. Tourne on April 20, 1990 and they were divorced on December 8, 1994.

Holliday married her third husband Judson E. "Judd" McLevey II, a naval flight officer, on March 23, 1996. They have two children.

== Awards and reception ==
- 2006 - Romance Writers of America RITA Award, Romance Novella – The Naked Truth about Guys in The Naked Truth
