= Michelle M. Pillow =

American novelist

- Born: Belleville, Kansas, U.S.
- Education: Fort Hays State University
- Occupation: Novelist
- Spouse: John Reyer Afamasaga (2016-present)
- Writing career
- Language: English
- Years active: 2004–present
- Genres: Paranormal Romance, Fantasy Romance,
- Notable works: Series: Dragon Lord, Warlock MacGregor, Order of Magic
- Website: michellepillow.com

Michelle M. Pillow is a New York Times and USA Today bestselling novelist with over one million books sold. She is a prolific author, with works spanning across many genres, but is best known for writing romance novels. She is recognized by the Romance Writers of America for writing over one hundred books and is also a member of the Authors Guild.

== Career ==
Pillow is a multi-published author writing in many romance fiction genres that include paranormal, science fiction, fantasy, historical, contemporary, and paranormal women's fiction. Books have been published by Random House, Virgin Books, Ebury, Rouge, Simon and Schuster (Pocket Books), Entangled Publishing, Adams Media, Ellora's Cave Publishing, Samhain Publishing, Running Press, Robinson Publishing, Paranormal Underground Magazine, The Raven Books, and others.

She has a Bachelor of General Studies in History/Business with an English Minor from Fort Hays State University and a photography degree from the New York Institute of Photography. She was also a journalist and photographer for Paranormal Underground Magazine.

Her romance writing career began in 2004 with her first published book The Mists of Midnight and in 2006 she was awarded the Romantic Times Bookclub Magazine's Reviewer's Choice Award for the historical romance Maiden and the Monster.

The anthology Taming The Alpha hit the New York Times and USA Today in 2014 and included her novel Stirring Up Trouble. In addition, she belonged to the Romance Writers of America, a non-profit organization that focuses on advocacy through increasing public awareness of the romance genre. The Virginia Romance Writers chapter established the HOLT Medallion in 1995 to recognize the achievements of published writers in romantic fiction. In 2015, Pillow received the Virginia Romance Writers HOLT Medallion Award of Merit for outstanding literary fiction for the book Love Potions.

Pillow is also involved in various film and historical documentary projects with her filmmaker husband, and played a refugee extra in Z Nation on SyFy that was released in 2016. Dragon Prince received praise in 2019 on SyFy as part of a science fiction and fantasy romance recommendation list.

In 2021, Pillow received a grant from the Mississippi Arts Commission in support of her Order of Magic paranormal women's fiction series.

== Fiction series ==
=== Qurilixen World Series ===
The Qurilixen World is a collection of multiple interconnected paranormal, fantasy, and science fiction series including Dragon Lords, Lords of the Var, Space Lords, Captured by the Dragon-Shifter, Galaxy Alien Mail Order Brides, Dynasty Lords, and Qurilixen Lords.

==== Dragon Lords ====
- The Barbarian Prince (2004) also appeared as: Variant: Barbarian Prince (2014) ISBN 978-1-62501-084-1
- The Perfect Prince (2004) also appeared as: Variant: Perfect Prince (2014) ISBN 978-1-62501-085-8
- The Dark Prince (2004) also appeared as: Variant: Dark Prince (2014) ISBN 978-1-62501-086-5
- The Warrior Prince (2005) also appeared as: Variant: Warrior Prince (2014) ISBN 978-1-62501-087-2
- His Highness the Duke (2012) ISBN 978-1-4524-1763-9
- The Stubborn Lord (2013) ISBN 978-1-62501-010-0
- The Reluctant Lord (2013) ISBN 978-1-62501-040-7
- The Impatient Lord (2014) ISBN 978-1-62501-042-1
- The Dragon's Queen (2014) ISBN 978-1-62501-082-7
- Dragon Lords: Books 1-4 (2014) ISBN 978-1-5022-5902-8
- Dragon Lords: Books 5-8 (2014) ISBN 978-1-5014-9751-3

==== Lords of the Var ====
- The Savage King (2005) ISBN 978-1-4524-7774-9
- The Playful Prince (2005) ISBN 978-1-4524-6384-1
- The Bound Prince (2005) ISBN 978-1-4524-8425-9
- The Rogue Prince (2005) ISBN 978-1-4524-4263-1
- The Pirate Prince (2011) ISBN 978-1-4524-7497-7

==== Space Lords ====
- Frost Maiden (2007) also appeared as: Variant: His Frost Maiden (2014) ISBN 978-1-4524-2122-3
- His Fire Maiden (2016) ISBN 978-1-62501-128-2
- His Metal Maiden (2016) ISBN 978-1-62501-142-8
- His Earth Maiden (2018) ISBN 978-1-62501-160-2
- His Woodland Maiden (2019) ISBN 978-1-62501-161-9

==== Captured by a Dragon-Shifter ====
- Determined Prince (2014) ISBN 978-1-62501-098-8
- Rebellious Prince (2015) ISBN 978-1-62501-099-5
- Stranded with the Cajun (2015) ISBN 978-1-62501-126-8
- Hunted by the Dragon (2016) ISBN 978-1-62501-138-1
- Mischievous Prince (2017) ISBN 978-1-62501-103-9
- Headstrong Prince (2017) ISBN 978-1-62501-104-6

==== Galaxy Alien Mail Order Brides ====
- Spark (2016) ISBN 978-1-62501-139-8
- Flame (2016) ISBN 978-1-62501-140-4
- Blaze (2016) ISBN 978-1-62501-141-1
- Ice (2018) ISBN 978-1-62501-216-6
- Frost (2018) ISBN 978-1-62501-223-4
- Snow (2019) ISBN 978-1-62501-220-3

==== Dynasty Lords ====
- Seduction of the Phoenix (2006) ISBN 978-1-4524-1106-4
- Temptation of the Butterfly (2006) ISBN 978-1-4524-8717-5

==== Qurilixen Lords ====
- Dragon Prince (2019) ISBN 978-1-62501-226-5
- Marked Prince (2020) ISBN 978-1-62501-253-1
- Feral Prince (2021) ISBN 9781625012562
- Fire Prince (2022) ISBN 978-1-62501-279-1

=== Warlocks MacGregor ===
- Love Potions (2014) ISBN 978-1-62501-120-6
- Spellbound (2015) ISBN 978-1-62501-119-0
- Stirring Up Trouble (2015) ISBN 978-1-62501-130-5
- Cauldrons and Confessions (2017) ISBN 978-1-62501-150-3
- Spirits and Spells (2018) ISBN 978-1-62501-151-0
- Kisses and Curses (2018) ISBN 978-1-62501-222-7
- Magick and Mischief (2020) ISBN 978-1-62501-238-8
- A Dash of Destiny (2020) ISBN 978-1-62501-258-6
- Night Magick (2021) ISBN 978-1-62501-2579

=== Order of Magic ===
- Second Chance Magic (2020) ISBN 978-1-62501-240-1
- Third Time's a Charm (2020) ISBN 978-1-62501-243-2
- The Fourth Power (2020) ISBN 978-1-62501-244-9
- The Fifth Sense (2020) ISBN 978-1-62501-252-4
- The Sixth Spell (2021) ISBN 978-1-62501-2616
- The Seventh Key (2022) ISBN 978-1-62501-280-7

=== Happily Everlasting ===
- Fooled Around and Spelled in Love (2017) ISBN 978-1-62501-153-4
- Curses and Cupcakes (2017) ISBN 978-1-62501-155-8

=== (Un)Lucky Valley ===
- Better Haunts & Garden Gnomes (2018) also appeared as: Variant: Better Haunts and Garden Gnomes (2018) ISBN 978-1-62501-162-6
- Any Witch Way But Goode (2019) ISBN 978-1-62501-228-9

=== Lords of the Abyss ===
- The Mighty Hunter (2006) ISBN 978-1-4524-0389-2
- Commanding the Tides (2007) ISBN 978-1-4524-1068-5
- Captive of the Deep (2010) ISBN 978-1-4524-5775-8
- Surrender to the Sea (2016) ISBN 978-1-62501-102-2
- Making Waves (2018) ISBN 978-1-62501-156-5
- The Merman King (2018) ISBN 978-1-62501-157-2
- Lords of the Abyss: Trilogy (2011) [O/1,2,3] also appeared as: Variant: Lords of the Abyss: Books 1-3 (2017) ISBN 978-1-62501-059-9
- Lords of the Abyss Bundle: Books 4-6 Box Set (2018) [O/4-6] ISBN 978-1-62501-230-2

=== Realm Immortal ===
- King of the Unblessed (2006) ISBN 978-1-62501-054-4
- Faery Queen (2007) ISBN 978-1-62501-094-0
- Stone Queen (2007) ISBN 978-1-62501-096-4

=== Divinity Warriors ===
- Lilith Enraptured (2009) ISBN 978-1-4524-0371-7
- Fighting Lady Jayne (2009) ISBN 978-1-4524-4735-3
- Keeping Paige (2009) ISBN 978-1-4524-6769-6
- Taking Karre (2009) ISBN 978-1-4524-1297-9

=== Divinity Healers ===
- Ariella's Keeper (2009) ISBN 978-1-62501-045-2
- Seducing Cecilia (2013) ISBN 978-1-62501-056-8
- Linnea's Arrangement (2013) ISBN 978-1-62501-064-3

=== Call of the Lycan ===
- Call of the Sea (2006) ISBN 978-1-4524-7661-2
- Call of the Untamed (2007) ISBN 978-1-4524-6528-9
- Call of Temptation (2008) ISBN 978-1-4524-5951-6
- Call of the Lycan: Trilogy Box Set (2013) ISBN 978-1-62501-057-5

=== Naughty Cupid ===
- Cupid's Enchantment (2005) ISBN 978-1-62501-231-9
- Cupid's Revenge (2005) ISBN 978-1-62501-233-3
- Cupid's Favor (2006) ISBN 978-1-62501-233-3

=== Tribes of the Vampire ===
- Redeemer of Shadows (2005) ISBN 978-1-62501-001-8
- The Jaded Hunter (2005) ISBN 978-1-62501-034-6
- Eternally Bound (2006) ISBN 978-1-62501-037-7
- In Her Shadows (2016) ISBN 978-1-62501-202-9

== Novels (single titles) ==
- The Mists of Midnight also appeared as: Variant: Forget Me Not (2004) ISBN 978-1-62501-134-3
- Red Light Specialists (2005) with Mandy M. Roth ISBN 978-1-4524-1748-6
- Pleasure Cruise (2005) with Mandy M. Roth ISBN 978-1-4524-1208-5
- Date with Destiny (2007) with Mandy M. Roth ISBN 978-1-4524-2843-7
- Pleasure Island (2009) with Mandy M. Roth ISBN 978-1-4524-6667-5
- Maiden and the Monster (2005) ISBN 978-1-45244-7834
- Emerald Knight (2005) ISBN 978-1-45249-7266
- Lord of Fire, Lady of Ice (2013) ISBN 978-1-62501-0070
- Pride and Prejudice: The Wild and Wanton Edition (2011) ISBN 978-1-44051-1288

== Novellas and short fiction ==
- A Midnight Seduction (2004) ISBN 978-1-45248-2736
- Portrait of His Obsession (2004) ISBN 978-1-62501-2364
- Animal Instinct (2004) ISBN 978-1-60928-127-4
- Silk (2005) ISBN 1-58608-701-0
- Scorched Destiny (2005) ISBN 978-1-45248-1494
- Phantom of the Night (2005) ISBN 978-1-45246-4848
- Taming Him (2005) ISBN 978-1-45242-6761
- Arrested Desires (2006) ISBN 978-1-45244-8886
- Romancing the Recluse (2006) with Mandy M. Roth ISBN 978-1-4524-0934-4
- Falcon's Mate (2006) ISBN 978-1-62501-133-6
- Last Man on Earth (2009) ISBN 978-1-41992-3869
- Faire Justice (2009) ISBN 978-1-60394-3031
- Good with His Hands (2010) ISBN 978-1-45246-4015
- Stolen Hours (2011) ISBN 978-1-62501-0384
- Everlastingly (2014) ISBN 978-1-62501-272-2

== Anthologies ==
- Ultimate Warriors (2005) with Jaide Fox and Brenna Lyons and Joy Nash ISBN 1-58608-701-0
- Ghost Cats 2 (2006) with Jaycee Clark and Mandy M. Roth ISBN 1-58608-784-3
- Taming Him (2007) with Kimberly Dean and Summer Devon ISBN 978-1-41653-6000
- Stop Dragon My Heart Around (2007) with Mandy M. Roth ISBN 978-1-4662-5017-8
- Prisoner of Love (2009) with Jaid Black and Tawny Taylor ISBN 978-1-43913-1534
- Ghost Cats. Samhain Publishing. (2011) with Jaycee Clark and Mandy M. Roth ISBN 978-1-60928-127-4
- Taming the Alpha (2014) with Mandy M. Roth, Michelle Pillow, T. S. Joyce, Chloe Cole, V. M. Black, Terah Edun, Carina Wilder, Cathryn Fox, Cristina Rayne, Jaycee Clark, JC Andrijeski, Tasha Black, R.E. Butler, Jaide Fox, Michele Bardsley, Renee George, T.J. Michaels, Elsa Jade, Allison Gatta, Arial Burnz, Mandy Rosko, Candice Gilmer, Dawn Michelle, Sylvia Frost, Lissa Matthews, and Lexy Cole ISBN 978-1-62501-095-7
- Kiss of Christmas Magic (2014) ISBN 978-1-50223-6142 with Eve Langlais, Aubrey Rose, Molly Prince, Deanna Chase, Mandy M. Roth, Michelle M. Pillow, Angie Fox, Mimi Strong, Viola Rivard, Michele Bardsley, V.M. Black, Lola St. Vil, Terah Edun, Jessa Slade, Chloe Cole, Cristina Rayne, Shawntelle Madison, J.S. Hope, Carina Wilder, Dawn Michelle, and Jessica Ryan
- Taming the Monster (2015) ISBN 978-1-62501-121-3 with Mandy M. Roth, Michelle M. Pillow, Carina Wilder, Cristina Rayne, Eve Vaughn, Jaide Fox, JC Andrijeski, Kim Knox, Michele Bardsley, Renee George, Mandy Rosko, Tracey H. Kitts, Ella Drake, Jaycee Clark, Candice Gilmer, Lexy Cox, and Jessica Collins
- A Very Alpha Christmas (2015) ISBN 978-1-62501-122-0 with Mandy M. Roth, Michelle M. Pillow, Cathryn Fox, Arial Burnz, Jaycee Clark, Slyvia Frost, Candice Gilmer, Tasha Black, T.J. Michaels, Renee George, Dawn Michelle, Lissa Matthews, Jaide Fox, Elsa Jade, R.E. Butler, Mandy Rosko, T.S. Joyce, Carina Wilder, Chloe Cole, Cristina Rayne, Lexy Cole, J.C. Andrijeski, and Michele Bardsley
- Taming the Vampire (2016) ISBN 978-1-62501-143-5 by Mandy M. Roth, Michelle M. Pillow, Kristen Painter, Yasmine Galenorn, Colleen Gleason, Jennifer Ashley, V. Vaughn, Carmen Caine, Marie Mason, Mina Carter, Deanna Chase, Emma Storm, Patricia A. Rasey, Alyssa Day, Caridad Piñeiro, Erin Kellison, Laurie London, Selene Charles, Chloe Cole, Elle Thorne, Tasha Black, J.C. Andrijeski, Jaide Fox, Tracey H. Kitts, Charlene Hartnady, Teresa Gabelman, Celia Kyle, and P. Jameson
- Alphas for the Holidays (2016) ISBN 978-1-62501-201-2 with Mandy M. Roth, Michelle M. Pillow, Celia Kyle, Elle Thorne, Mina Carter, P. Jameson, Kristen Painter, Chloe Cole, Colleen Gleason, K.F. Breene, Bella Love-Wins, Deanna Chase, Jennifer Blackstream, Angie Fox, Ann Gimpel, Christine Pope, Marie Mason, Anthea Lawson, Bianca D'Arc, Jovee Winters, Tasha Black, JC Andrijeski, Dawn Montgomery, Jaycee Clark, Suzanne Rock, Tracey H. Kitts, Celeste Anwar, and Jax Cassidy

== Non-fiction ==
- The Write Ingredients: Recipes from Your Favorite Authors Samhain Publishing. (2007) along with Lori Foster and Diane Castell, contributing authors include: Jim Alexander, Susan Andersen, Liz Andrews, Cynthianna Appel, Becky Barker, Jules Bennett, Lucinda Betts, Toni Blake, Allie Boniface, Denysé Bridger, Gemma Bruce, Jaci Burton, Stella Cameron, Mary Campisi, Tori Carrington, Cindy Carver, Billie Warren Chai, Celine Chatillon, Colleen Collins, Debby Conrad, Jodi Lynn Copeland, Sydney Croft, Cindy Cruciger, Paige Cuccaro, Bianca D'Arc, Gia Dawn, Sylvia Day, Jamie Denton, Danielle Devon, Roseanne Dowell, Christine Feehan, Kate Fellowes, Holly Fitzgerald, Suzanne Forster, Jenny Gardiner, Amber Green, Tilly Greene, Heather Grothaus, Rosey Haggerty, Karen Harper, Ingela F. Hyatt, Larissa Ione, Marcia James, Nicole Jordan, Sylvie Kaye, Susan Kearney, Mia King, Karen Kendall, Susanne Marie Knight, Jayne Ann Krentz, Rosemary Laurey, Kathleen Lawless, Jo Leigh, Toni Leland, Julie Leto, Cathy Liggett, Patricia Lorenz, Larissa Lyons, Allie Mackay, Donna MacMeans, Catherine Mann, Janice Maynard, Cheyenne McCray, Amanda McIntyre, LuAnn McLane, Patrice Michelle, Cindi Myers, Rhonda Nelson, Brenda Novak, Susan Elizabeth Phillips, Michelle M. Pillow, Mary Jo Putney, Anne Rainey, Tonya Ramagos, Joanne Rock, Patricia Sargeant, Melissa Schroeder, Shana Schwer, Jill Shalvis, Jennah Sharpe, Suzanne Simmons, Catherine Spaulding, Michele Stegman, Kay Stockham, Karin Tabke, Jean Marie Ward, Ann M. Warner, Nancy Warren, Carys Weldon, SueEllen Welfonder, Diane Whiteside, Lori Wilde, J.C. Wilder, Brenda Williamson, C. J. Winters, Justine Wittich. ISBN 978-1-59998-6531
