= The Vampire Chronicles (disambiguation) =

The Vampire Chronicles is a novel series by Anne Rice

The Vampire Chronicles or Vampire Chronicle may also refer to:

== Literature ==
- Vampire Chronicles, a 1997 publication by Karl Fulves
- The Record of a Fallen Vampire, a manga series known in France as Vampire Chronicles
- The Gardella Vampire Chronicles, a novel series by Colleen Gleason
- Clockwork Vampire Chronicles, a novel series by Andy Remic

== Music ==
- The Vampire Chronicles, a 1999 album by Theatres des Vampires
- D Vampire Chronicle: V-Best Selection, a 2014 album by D
- "Vampire Chronicle Jure Grando", a theatre music piece performed by Tamara Obrovac in 2016

== Other ==
- Darkstalkers Chronicle: The Chaos Tower, a video game known in Japan as Vampire Chronicle: The Chaos Tower
- Amalanhig: The Vampire Chronicles, a 2017 film featuring Sanya Lopez
