= Child of Fire =

2009 novel by Harry Connolly

Child of Fire is a 2009 urban fantasy novel by Harry Connolly. It was first published by Del Rey Books.

== Synopsis ==
Ex-convict Raymond Lilly and magician Annalise Powiss must save a small town from a supernatural menace that is not only killing the town's children via spontaneous combustion, but erasing them from the memories of survivors.

== Reception ==
Publishers Weekly considered that it was "intense" and would "enthrall readers", including it on their list of the 100 best books of 2009. BoingBoing called it "witty and fast-paced".

SF Signal noted its "rapid pace", but was ultimately far more negative, calling the novel "(m)ediocre at best and painful at worst", and particularly criticizing Connolly for "lack of consistent characterization" and an "erratic" and "extremely repetitive" plot. Strange Horizons observed that the book "feels as if it were itself a sequel, giving the reader the sense of coming in at the second volume of a series", with previous interactions between Raymond and Annalise "only alluded to".
