= Harry Connolly =

Harry Connolly may refer to:

- Harry Connolly (American football) (1920–2006), American football player
- Harry Connolly (writer), American author of the Twenty Palaces novel series
