= Impossible Dreams =

- Short story by Tim Pratt
- Country: United States
- Language: English
- Genre: Science fiction

Publication
- Published in: Asimov's Science Fiction
- Publication type: Magazine
- Publication date: July 2006

"Impossible Dreams" is a science fiction short story written in 2006 by Tim Pratt. It was first published in Asimov's Science Fiction in 2006, and subsequently republished in Pratt's 2007 collection Hart & Boot & Other Stories, and in the 2012 anthology Other Worlds Than These.

== Plot summary ==
Pete is a cinephile. One day, he discovers a video store containing movies that were never created. He discovers that he enters a parallel universe every time he visits the store, and becomes both frustrated and elated as he tries to watch as many of the videos as possible, while forming a bond with the store's downbeat clerk. By the end of the short story, Pete is now friends with Ally. Ally grew tired of the parallel universe and is now living with Pete and watching movies with him.

== Characters ==
- Pete – One of the main characters of the story. Pete is a movie lover. He meets Ally in the parallel movie store and there he sees a variety of movies that are parallel to the ones that he had in his world.
- Ally – The other main character of the story. Ally works in the movie store in the parallel world. Ally later leaves the parallel world and joins Pete in his world.

== Movies in the parallel world ==
- The Death of Superman – directed by Tim Burton and starring Nicolas Cage
- Total Recall – directed by David Cronenberg
- The Terminator – starring O. J. Simpson
- Raiders of the Lost Ark – starring Tom Selleck
- Casablanca – starring George Raft
- A.I. Artificial Intelligence – Kubrick lived to complete this
- The Lunch Bunch – not a real movie but in the parallel world it is a sequel to The Breakfast Club

== Reception ==
"Impossible Dreams" won the 2007 Hugo Award for Best Short Story.

Several reviews stated that the novella and movie are like the Twilight Zone. In addition, the novella inspires the reader to become a movie buff. Pete is described by one critic as "a young film buff who discovers a movie rental shop from a parallel universe."

== Film adaptation ==
In 2011, a short film adaptation of "Impossible Dreams" was made in Israel by Shir Comay in the Hebrew language (the Hebrew title is וידאו קסם, literally "Magic Video-rentals"). The film premiered on July 12, 2011, as part of the Jerusalem Film Festival, and won the Israeli shorts competition in the ICon festival 2011 Israeli shorts competition.
