= Simon Morden =

English science fiction author

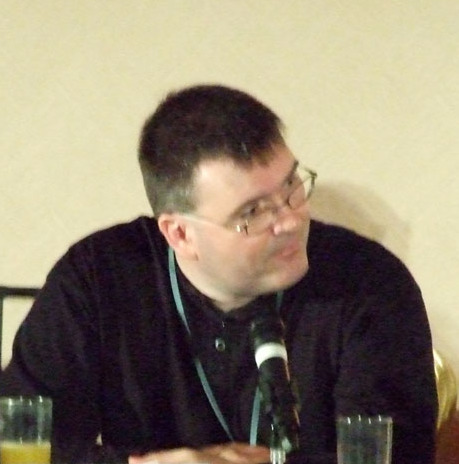
- Morden in 2011
- Born: England
- Education: BSc (Sheffield), PhD (Newcastle)
- Writing career
- Genre: Science fiction
- Notable work: Metrozone series (aka The Samuil Petrovitch series)
- Notable awards: Philip K. Dick Award (2011)
- Website: bookofmorden.co.uk

Simon Morden is an English science fiction author, best known for his Philip K. Dick Award–winning Metrozone series of novels set in post-apocalyptic London.

== Biography ==
Morden was educated as a scientist, attaining a BSc (Hons) in Geology from the University of Sheffield and his PhD in Geophysics from Newcastle University.

Morden has worked in a variety of roles including a school caretaker, an admin assistant, a personal assistant to a financial advisor and is currently a teaching assistant for a design technology class at a primary school in Gateshead. In terms of his writing career, Morden is the former editor of Focus magazine; he has been on the Arthur C. Clarke Award judging panel; and he's a regular speaker on Christian matters in fiction at the Greenbelt Festival. Morden identifies as a Christian.

Morden first achieved success as a writer when his novel Heart was published by Razorblade Press in 2002.

His writing influences include Charles Stross, Ray Bradbury, Julian May, and Michael Marshall Smith

== Bibliography ==
=== The Metrozone series ===
- Equations of Life (2011, Orbit)
- Theories of Flight (2011, Orbit)
- Degrees of Freedom (2011, Orbit)
- The Curve of the Earth (2013, Orbit)

=== The Down series ===
- Down Station (February 2016)
- The White City (2016, Gollancz)

=== The Frank Kittridge series ===
- One Way (as S.J. Morden) (April 2018, Orbit)
- No Way (as S.J. Morden) (February 2019, Orbit)
- Gallowglass (as S.J. Morden) (December 2020, Gollancz)
- The Flight Of The Aphrodite (as S.J. Morden) (November 2022, Gollancz)

=== Stand-alone works ===
- Heart (2002, Razorblade)
- Another War (novella) (2005, Telos)
- The Lost Art (2007, David Fickling)
- Arcanum (19 November 2013, Orbit)
- At The Speed Of Light (January 2017, Newcon Press)
- Bright Morning Star (2019)
- The Red Planet - a natural history of Mars (2021 Elliott and Thompson Ltd)

=== Collections ===
- Thy Kingdom Come (Multimedia disc) (2002, Lone Wolf Publications)
  - Thy Kingdom Come (Limited edition hardback) (2013, Jurassic London)
- Brilliant Things (2004, Subway)

== Awards ==
- 2006 World Fantasy Award, Best Novella shortlist, Another War
- 2009 Catalyst Book Award for teen fiction, shortlist, The Lost Art
- 2012 Arthur C. Clarke Award, longlist, Equations of Life
- 2012 Philip K. Dick Award, overall winner, The Samuil Petrovitch Trilogy
- 2013 BSFA Award for Best Artwork, shortlist, Thy Kingdom Come
