= Orbit Books =

International publisher that specialises in science fiction and fantasy books

- Parent company: Hachette Book Group (Lagardère Publishing)
- Founded: 1974
- Country of origin: United Kingdom
- Headquarters location: London
- Distribution: United Kingdom, United States, Australia, South Africa, France
- Fiction genres: Science fiction, fantasy
- Imprints: Redhook
- Official website: orbitbooks.net

Orbit Books is an international publisher that specialises in science fiction and fantasy books. It is a division of Hachette Book Group, owned by Lagardère Publishing.

== History ==
Orbit Books was founded in 1974 as part of the Macdonald Futura publishing company. In 1992, its parent company was bought by Little, Brown & Co., at that stage part of the Time Warner Book Group (now Hachette Book Group). In 1997, Orbit acquired the Legend imprint from Random House.

In 2006, Orbit's parent company Little, Brown was sold by Time Warner to the French publishing group Hachette Livre.

By summer 2006, Orbit began to expand internationally, with the establishment of Orbit imprints in the United States and Australia. Orbit Publishing Director Tim Holman relocated to New York to establish Orbit US as an imprint of Hachette Book Group. In June 2007, Orbit appointed Bernadette Foley as publisher for Orbit Australia, an imprint of Hachette Livre Australia. In 2009 Orbit expanded to France, used by the publisher Calman Levy.

Orbit Books planned to publish a horror novel titled Shy Girl in 2026, but ultimately cancelled the publication following widespread allegations that it was written using generative AI.

== Authors ==
- Rachel Aaron
- Joe Abercrombie
- Daniel Abraham (also as M. L. N. Hanover)
- Brian W. Aldiss
- Kevin J. Anderson
- Kelley Armstrong
- Luke Arnold
- Stephen Aryan
- Paolo Bacigalupi
- R. Scott Bakker
- Mia Ballard
- Josiah Bancroft
- Iain M. Banks
- Robert Jackson Bennett
- Patricia Briggs
- David Brin
- Terry Brooks
- Robert Buettner
- Jesse Bullington
- Jim Butcher
- Trudi Canavan
- Orson Scott Card
- Mike Carey (also as M. R. Carey)
- Amanda Carlson
- Gail Carriger
- Heather Child
- James Clemens
- Michael Cobley
- James S. A. Corey
- David Dalglish
- Marianne de Pierres
- Terry DeHart
- Amanda Downum
- Nicholas Eames
- Kate Elliott
- David Farland
- Charlie Fletcher
- Philip Fracassi
- Pamela Freeman
- Celia Friedman
- John R. Fultz
- Ian Graham
- Jo Graham
- Mira Grant
- Kate Griffin
- Jon Courtenay Grimwood
- Laurell K. Hamilton
- Kevin Hearne
- Barb and J. C. Hendee
- Tanya Huff
- Charlie Huston
- Ian Irvine
- James Islington
- Trent Jamieson
- N. K. Jemisin
- J. V. Jones
- Celine Kiernan
- Russell Kirkpatrick
- Mur Lafferty
- Glenda Larke
- Tim Lebbon
- Ann Leckie
- Marjorie M. Liu
- Helen Lowe
- Ken MacLeod
- Devin Madson
- Gail Z. Martin
- T. C. McCarthy
- Fiona McIntosh
- Karen Miller
- Elizabeth Moon
- Christopher Moore
- Simon Morden
- Rachel Neumeier
- Annalee Newitz
- Kristen Painter
- Philip Palmer
- K. J. Parker
- H. G. Parry
- Nicole Peeler
- Jennifer Rardin
- Andy Remic
- Kim Stanley Robinson
- Brian Ruckley
- Lilith Saintcrow
- Andrzej Sapkowski
- Joel Shepherd
- Jeff Somers
- Allen Steele
- Charles Stross
- Michael J. Sullivan
- Tricia Sullivan
- Tasha Suri
- Sam Sykes
- Tade Thompson
- Karen Traviss
- Angus Watson
- Brent Weeks
- Jaye Wells
- Sean Williams
- Tad Williams
- Walter Jon Williams
- Evan Winter
