= The Strange Adventures of Rangergirl =

2005 novel

- Original cover
- Author: Tim Pratt
- Cover artist: Michael Koelsch
- Language: English
- Genre: Fantasy Western, mythopoeic fantasy
- Publisher: Bantam Spectra
- Publication date: November 29, 2005
- Publication place: United States
- Media type: Print (Paperback)
- Pages: 399 pp
- ISBN: 0-553-38338-8
- OCLC: 60835512
- Dewey Decimal: 813/.6 22
- LC Class: PS3616.R385 S73 2005

The Strange Adventures of Rangergirl is a 2005 novel by Tim Pratt. This is Pratt's first full-length novel. Rangergirl takes place in the real world, but with supernatural and Western elements. The cover artwork was illustrated by pulp artist Michael Koelsch.

== Plot summary ==
Marzi McCarty is an art school dropout working at Santa Cruz coffeeshop Genius Loci. She draws a comic book called The Strange Adventures of Rangergirl, featuring the eponymous heroine fighting the evil Outlaw in a Fantasy Western setting.

College student Jonathan rents a room in Genius Loci in order to study the murals inside. They are the last works of Garamond Ray, an artist who disappeared during the 1989 Loma Prieta earthquake. He is interested in a desert-themed mural in the storage room, which Marzi has sealed off as structurally unsound.

As Marzi, Jonathan, and Marzi's best friend Lindsey get to know one another, strange incidents begin to occur at Genius Loci. People in the shop hear voices. Marzi has recurring flashbacks of a door in a desert. Art student Beej rambles about a god trapped in the shop. A mudslide interrupts a romantic outdoor interlude between graduate students Denis and Jane; Denis escapes but leaves Jane to die. Jane's body is transformed into mud, and she begins talking about an earth goddess living inside the shop.

Marzi recovers a repressed memory: several years before, she had opened the door inside the storage room, encountering the dimension within and the god trapped inside it. This contact allowed the god to influence the real world, but also marked Marzi as the door's guardian, giving her subconscious influence on the space inside. The dimension has taken on the Weird West aesthetic of her comic book, and the nameless god has taken on the guise of the Outlaw, causing it to look and act like an outlaw stock character in a Western, complete with cowboy hat.

The Outlaw manipulates Jonathan into opening the door and escapes, throwing Jonathan inside and placing a deadly curse on him. He tells Marzi that Jonathan will die if she doesn't rescue him. When Marzi insults him, he realizes her influence has made him significantly more human: he gloats, has insight, and takes offense. Each too weak to defeat the other, they vow to have a showdown, and the Outlaw leaves.

Marzi and Lindsey enter the realm beyond the door to save Jonathan and find out how to defeat the Outlaw. Outfitted as Rangergirl and her sidekick, they find the painter Garamond Ray in a saloon, along with Jonathan's unconscious body. Ray captured the god in 1989, causing the Loma Prieta quake, but was trapped inside with it. An oracle appears and tells them to find her temple in the desert, where she can answer one question.

The Outlaw rounds up Beej, Denis, and Jane into a posse. He compels Beej and Denis to construct a hideous iron door, which contains a pocket dimension of its own. They place it in front of the door inside Genius Loci, forming a trap. Beej remains within the door, while the Outlaw's posse causes havoc throughout Santa Cruz.

Marzi and Lindsey ask the oracle for information about saving Jonathan instead of defeating the Outlaw. They enter Jonathan's soul to revive him, then return to the real world to pursue the Outlaw. Marzi believes that the Outlaw will surrender when she challenges him, expecting her to refuse to shoot an unarmed opponent. Marzi plans to subvert the narrative and kill him anyway. Marzi and her friends leave the alternate dimension but find themselves trapped inside Genius Loci, where the murals come to life and threaten them. Marzi persuades Beej to let them go, and they escape into the real world.

The group finds the Outlaw. Marzi prepares to duel him, but realizes that if she goes outside the traditional Western narrative by killing the Outlaw instead of capturing him alive, he will no longer be constrained by the Outlaw trope and will be free to destroy Santa Cruz. Denis sees an opportunity to escape and stabs the Outlaw in the back. Since betrayal by henchmen is a typical Western convention, the Outlaw remains constrained within the narrative and is destroyed for good.

== Setting ==
Tim Pratt had lived in Santa Cruz for a few years and derived much appreciation for the town and, therefore was able to deliver the backdrop for Rangergirl.

Points of Interest

- Genius Loci: inspired from Caffe Pergolesi, a popular coffee shop located behind the downtown area.
- The Red Room: nearby bar that Marzi, Lindesy, and Jonathan attend. This is where Marzi first sees the Outlaw. The bar is a hotspot for college students and the locals.
- Neptune's Kingdom: in Marzi's dream, she encounters the oracle at this location. It is found at the Boardwalk.
- UC Santa Cruz: many of the character are students there; the Outlaw has Beej and Denis construct the special door at one of the art studios.
- Downtown Clock Tower: the Outlaw recognizes this being the only structure that survived the 1989 earthquake and therefore made it his first thing to destroy. The clock can be found one of the ends of the main downtown strip, where Pacific Ave meets with Mission St.

== Major themes ==
The story of Rangergirl has elements of fantasy and roots of mythology. The idea of gods that are not currently being worshipped but still exist in modern-day society is an idea that has almost become its own genre. Writers like Neil Gaiman greatly explored this concept. The western setup is something of great use. The book was described as cowpunk, which usually is referred to a style of music, but at the same time, gives the same kind of edge that this story holds. Plus, the fantasy western structure is reminiscent of other stories such as Jonah Hex, Brisco County, Jr., and Stephen King's The Dark Tower series.

== Reception ==
General critical reception to Rangergirl was mixed. Publishers Weekly found the theme of Rangergirl simplistic and naïve. Kelly Shaw of Strange Horizons praised the first half of the book for its intriguing cast of characters, but criticized the latter half for its adherence to conventions of the Western genre and what he felt was "over-the-top characterization of the Outlaw". Kirkus Reviews also criticized the book's second half, calling it a "thin premise" that Pratt did not have the skill to maintain. Claude Lalumière of the Montreal Gazette praised the novel's blend of genres and Marzi's character development, but noted that the author occasionally turned characters into "mouthpieces for his personal likes and dislikes". Rick Kleffel of the Agony Column at Trash-O-Tron focused on the characters as the main positive, especially unwilling collaborator Denis. He also enjoyed Pratt's detailed invocation of Santa Cruz. Ernest Lilley at SF Revu also highlighted Pratt's portrait of Santa Cruz, as well as the mythological style of the supernatural elements.

The Strange Adventures of Rangergirl was a finalist for the 2006 Mythopoeic Awards, but lost to Anansi Boys by Neil Gaiman.
