= Evan Winter =

Canadian fantasy author

- Born: England
- Occupation: Writer
- Known for: The Rage of Dragons, The Fires of Vengeance
- Website: evanwinter.com

Evan Winter is a Canadian author of epic fantasy. His first novel, The Rage of Dragons, was originally self-published in 2017. In 2020, TIME named it one of the 100 best fantasy books of all time. A sequel, called The Fires of Vengeance, was published in 2020.

Following its initial publication, Orbit Books re-released The Rage of Dragons and signed Winter to a four-book deal. The Rage of Dragons was on the long list of the CBC's 2020 Canada Reads.

== Personal life ==
Winter was born in England to South American parents of African ancestry and raised in Zambia. He has also worked as a filmmaker, creative director, and a bartender.

== Bibliography ==
=== The Burning series ===
- The Rage of Dragons (2017)
- The Fires of Vengeance (2020)
- The Lord of Demons (TBA)
