= David Dalglish =

American writer of epic fantasy fiction

- Born: April 2, 1984 (age 42)
- Education: Missouri Southern State University
- Occupation: Author
- Writing career
- Genre: Fiction
- Subject: High fantasy
- Notable works: The Shadowdance Series, The Breaking World, The Half-Orcs
- Website: ddalglish.com

David Dalglish (born April 2, 1984) is an American writer of epic fantasy fiction.

== Early life and education ==
Dalglish graduated with a degree in Mathematics from Missouri Southern State University in 2006.

== Career ==
Dalglish used to live in Missouri where he worked odd jobs before self-publishing his first novel, The Weight of Blood, in 2010. In 2013, after releasing fifteen novels as e-books and more than 200,000 sales, Dalglish signed a publishing deal with Orbit Books to re-release his Shadowdance Series of novels. Later that year, he also signed an agreement with 47North, part of Amazon Publishing, to publish a new series, The Breaking World. In 2019 he, along with his family, moved to South Carolina, where he has written the series "The Keepers".

== Work ==
Most of Dalglish's work takes place within his invented world of Dezrel, and much was originally self-published: The Half-Orcs, an R.A. Salvatore-inspired series starring a pair half-orc brothers; The Shadowdance Series, a lengthy adventure starring thieves and assassins; The Paladins; and The Breaking World (published by 47North, which chronicles the creation of his world and the war between gods that is referenced in all his earlier works.) Dalglish also served as editor and main contributor to A Land of Ash, a short fiction anthology dealing with the fallout from the eruption of the Yellowstone Caldera.

Publishers Weekly wrote that, "Dalglish puts familiar pieces together with a freshness and pleasure that are contagious."

According to fantasy author Sam Sykes, "Dalglish concocts a heady cocktail of energy, breakneck pace, and excitement."

== Bibliography ==
=== The Half-Orcs (self-Published) ===
- The Weight of Blood (January 31, 2010)
- The Cost of Betrayal (March 25, 2010)
- The Death of Promises (May 30, 2010)
- The Shadows of Grace (October 7, 2010)
- A Sliver of Redemption (January 19, 2011)
- A Prison of Angels (November 29, 2012)
- The King of the Vile (January 26, 2015)
- The King of the Fallen (August 3, 2020)

=== The Shadowdance Series ===
- A Dance of Cloaks (self-published 2011, with Orbit Books October 8, 2013)
- A Dance of Blades (self-published 2011, with Orbit Books November 5, 2013)
- A Dance of Mirrors (self-published as A Dance of Death 2012, with Orbit Books December 3, 2013)
- A Dance of Shadows (self-published as Blood of the Father 2012, with Orbit Books May 20, 2014)
- A Dance of Ghosts (Orbit Books, November 11, 2014)
- A Dance of Chaos (Orbit Books, May 12, 2015)
- Cloak and Spider: A Shadowdance Novella (Orbit Books, December 3, 2013)

=== The Paladins (self-published) ===
- Night of Wolves (May 31, 2011)
- Clash of Faiths (July 24, 2011)
- The Old Ways (December 30, 2011)
- The Broken Pieces (August 19, 2012)

=== The Breaking World (with Robert J. Duperr) (47North) ===
- Dawn of Swords (January 14, 2014)
- Wrath of Lions (April 22, 2014)
- Blood of Gods (October 14, 2014)

=== The Seraphim Trilogy (Orbit Books) ===
- Skyborn (November 17, 2015)
- Fireborn (November 22, 2016)
- Shadowborn (November 7, 2017)

=== The Keepers (Orbit Books) ===
- Soulkeeper (March 19, 2019)
- Ravencaller (March 17, 2020)
- Voidbreaker (February 9, 2021)

=== Vagrant Gods (Orbit Books) ===
- The Bladed Faith (April 5, 2022)
- The Sapphire Altar (January 10, 2023)
- The Slain Divine (January 9, 2024)

== Other works ==
In 2016, Dalglish gave his permission for Night of Wolves, book one of The Paladins, to be turned into Paladins: Text Adventure, a work of interactive fiction available from Delight Games. In 2017, Clash of Faiths, book two of The Paladins, was also added to this program. It is currently available on Google Play and Amazon Underground.
