= Stoker and Holmes =

Stoker and Holmes is a series of young adult novels by American author Colleen Gleason. The series is set in a steampunk London and features two young women with famous relatives: Alvermina (Mina) Holmes, the niece of Sherlock Holmes, and Evaline Stoker, the sister of Bram Stoker. Evaline is also a descendant of Victoria Gardella of The Gardella Vampire Chronicles.

The first book in the series, The Clockwork Scarab, was published by Chronicle Books in September 2013. The second book, titled The Spiritglass Charade, was published in October 2014. The third book, The Chess Queen Enigma, was published a year later, in October 2015. The fourth book, titled The Carnelian Crow, came out in July 2017.
