= Carolyn Crane =

American novelist

- Carolyn Crane at the Romance Writers of America Literacy Signing, July 22, 2015, New York, NY
- Education: University of Minnesota (BA)
- Occupations: Writer, Novelist
- Writing career
- Pen name: Carolyn Crane, Annika Martin
- Period: 2010 - present
- Genre: Urban fantasy Romantic suspense
- Notable work: Off the Edge
- Notable awards: RITA award – Romantic Suspense; 2014 Off the Edge
- Website: www.annikamartinbooks.com

Carolyn Crane is an American author of the Disillusionists urban fantasy trilogy, as well as the Associates romantic suspense series. Her novel Off the Edge won a Romance Writers of America RITA Award in 2014 for Best Romantic Suspense, making this the first self-published novel to win a RITA.

== Biography ==
Crane grew up in the suburbs of Chicago and Milwaukee, attending Arrowhead High School in Wisconsin. She studied English literature and earned her BA from the University of Minnesota in 1991 and currently lives in Minneapolis with her husband and two cats.

Crane cites reading Diana Gabaldon's Outlander, Laurell K. Hamilton’s Anita Blake series, and Kelley Armstrong's Bitten in reinspiring her to write after getting her degree.

Crane wrote two unpublished novels before she was picked up by agent Cameron McClure of the Donald Maass Literary Agency. In 2008, McClure sold the first two books of her new urban fantasy trilogy, The Disillusionists, to Bantam/Spectra, a division of Random House. Her debut novel, Mind Games, was released March 23, 2010. Due to low sales, Spectra announced that summer that it would not opt for the third book in the series. The third was sold to Samhain Publishing, Audible.com released all three titles on October 25, 2011, and the series was optioned for TV.

Her first foray into self-publishing was collaborating with Meljean Brook and Jill Myles in the anthology Wild and Steamy, in which Crane had a novella "Kitten-tiger & the Monk" that was a part of the Disilluionists world.

She indicated in an interview with SFF World that she has two new series in development.

== Bibliography ==
=== Disillusionist Trilogy ===
1. Mind Games. Spectra. March 2010 [2010]. ISBN 9780553592610.
2. Double Cross. Spectra. September 2010 [2010]. ISBN 9780553592627.
2.5 Kitten-tiger & the Monk. August 2011 [2011]. in the anthology Wild & Steamy and Novellas & Stories
3. Head Rush. Samhain. December 2011 [2011]. ISBN 9781609286255.
3.5 Devil's Luck. February 2012 [2012].

=== Code of Shadows Series ===
0.5. Conjuring Max. March 2013 [2013]. ISBN 9780989461108. in the anthology Fire & Frost and Novellas & Stories
1. Mr. Real. October 2012 [2012]. ISBN 9780988313101.

=== The Associates Series ===
1. Crane, Carolyn; Martin, Annika (April 2013) [2013]. Against the Dark. Carolyn Crane. ISBN 9780988313118.
2. Crane, Carolyn; Martin, Annika (December 2013) [2013]. Off the Edge. Carolyn Crane. ISBN 9780988313125.
3. Crane, Carolyn (July 2014) [2014]. Into the Shadows. Carolyn Crane. ISBN 9780988313132.
4. Crane, Carolyn (May 2015) [2015]. Behind the Mask. Carolyn Crane. ISBN 9780988313163.

=== Novellas/Short Stories ===
- Telep, Trisha (September 2012) [2013]. Old Salt. Running Press. ISBN 9780762442690. in the Mammoth Book of Ghost Romance

=== Audio ===
1. Against the Dark. Tantor. October 2014 [2014]. ISBN 9781494505622.
2. Off the Edge. Tantor. November 2014 [2014]. ISBN 9781494555634.
3. Into the Shadows. Tantor. December 2014 [2014]. ISBN 9781494505646.

== Awards and reception ==
Critical reception to Crane's work has been positive, with Romantic Times giving the first two books in the Disillusionist Trilogy four and a half stars.

- 2014 - Romance Writers of America RITA Award, Romantic Suspense – Off the Edge

Awards
Preceded by Laura Griffin	Winner of the RITA Award for Best Romantic Suspense; 2014	Current holder
