= The Gardella Vampire Chronicles =

The Gardella Vampire Chronicles is a series of historical romance fantasy novels by the American writer Colleen Gleason about a family of vampire hunters who have lived throughout the ages, hunting the undead.

The first five novels in the series chronicle the story of Victoria Gardella Grantworth, a newly married heiress living in 1820s Regency era England as she struggles to maintain a normal life among London’s haute ton "Society" and her nightly duties of hunting and killing vampires.

Gleason has recently continued the series in a spin-off featuring Macey Gardella, an American descendant of Victoria. The first book, Roaring Midnight, is set in Chicago during the Roaring Twenties.

Additionally, Gleason gives a nod to the Gardella Vampire Chronicles in her steampunk series for young adults, Stoker and Holmes. One of the characters (Miss Stoker) is a descendant of Victoria Gardella, as well as being the sister of Bram Stoker.

== Series overview ==
The initial five novels are classified as paranormal romance, although they actually fall between several different genres, including historical fiction, paranormal romance, and horror. The novels have elements of each of these genres, but do not adhere to all the strictures of any of them.

== The Venators ==
Ever since the first Gardella was called to fight vampires in First-Century Rome, members of the Gardella family have been chosen to take up the duty of ridding the world of the evil undead. Those selected for this responsibility are warned through a series of five horrible dreams within a short time–dreams that demonstrate and portend their future of hunting vampires and battling evil. Many who are called don't know the meaning of the dreams until after the fifth one, when they are educated about the world of vampires and Venators by a mentor that is sent to them.

Once the dreams have occurred, and if the dreamer agrees to accept the Legacy, the chosen person must pass a test: to hunt and kill a vampire. One who is called to this duty bears the innate sense and skill to carry out this duty, although he or she may decide not to accept the calling. If the chosen Gardella is successful in slaying a vampire, then he (or she) is given the vis bulla and becomes a full-fledged Venator, or vampire hunter.

The vis bulla is a holy strength amulet, a tiny silver cross forged from a small vein beneath the mountain of Golgatha and steeped in holy water. It provides protection, strength, speed, and fast-healing capability for the Venator.

There are no more than two hundred Venators world wide at any given time; across branches of the Gardella family throughout the earth. They are often unaware of their family legacy until the five dreams, and the subsequent visit by the mentor.

These randomly appearing members of the Gardella family tree are known as born Venators, for they were born to their duty and chosen for the Legacy.

=== Vampires ===
The first vampire was Judas Iscariot, who was seduced by Lucifer to join him after he sold Jesus Christ. Believing that he would never be forgiven, Judas hanged himself, and Lucifer used him to create a new race of creatures: half-man and half-demon, who would survive by drinking the blood of mortal man.

Lilith the Dark is the daughter of Judas, and has been alive for more than a millennium. She is the most powerful vampire on the earth today, and rules over the members of her race.

All vampires have red eyes and fangs, and will burn if subjected to direct sunlight. A stake to the heart will destroy any vampire, as will a beheading. Because of the ties between Judas and Jesus Christ, vampires are afraid of silver (due to the thirty pieces Judas received in payment for selling Jesus) and other holy objects.

Guardian vampires are those in Lilith's elite guard, and their eyes glow ruby pink instead of bloodred. These vampires have a particularly strong capability to enthrall their victims, and their fangs release a special poison at will.

Imperials are the most fearsome of all vampires. They usually have long hair and they nearly always carry swords. They can fly and glide through the air and have the ability to pull the life-force from a human without touching or biting them, also having the ability to function in the day as long as they avoid direct sunlight.

=== The worldbuilding ===
The world of the Gardella Vampire Chronicles is one of an alternate reality in specific time periods. The early novels verge on steampunk, and as the series develops, may eventually grow into more of that genre.

The vampire hunters of the Gardella Legacy are called Venators, and there are up to one hundred of them at any given time in the world. The vast majority of them are from the far-flung branches of the Gardella family tree, but there are some Venators who, even without Gardella blood, make the choice and pass the deadly test that allow them to become vampire hunters.

The Venators wear a holy amulet in the shape of a silver cross known as a vis bulla, which gives them strength, speed, and fast-healing capabilities.

The Venators fight the demonic vampires, of which Judas of Iscariot was the first of his race: a unique combination of demon and man.

=== Victoria Gardella ===
The first five books in the Gardella Vampire Chronicles feature the story of Victoria Gardella, a young debutant in Regency-era (1810–1820) England. Like Buffy the Vampire Slayer, Victoria struggles with balancing her “normal” life among London’s haute ton with that of her secret duty of being a Venator.

== Novels ==
1. The Rest Falls Away (2007) ISBN 978-0-451-22007-3
2. Rises the Night (2007) ISBN 978-0-451-22146-9
3. The Bleeding Dusk (2008) ISBN 978-0-451-22326-5
4. When Twilight Burns (2008) ISBN 978-0-451-22475-0
5. As Shadows Fade (March 3, 2009) ISBN 978-0-451-22632-7
