= Melissa F. Olson =

American writer

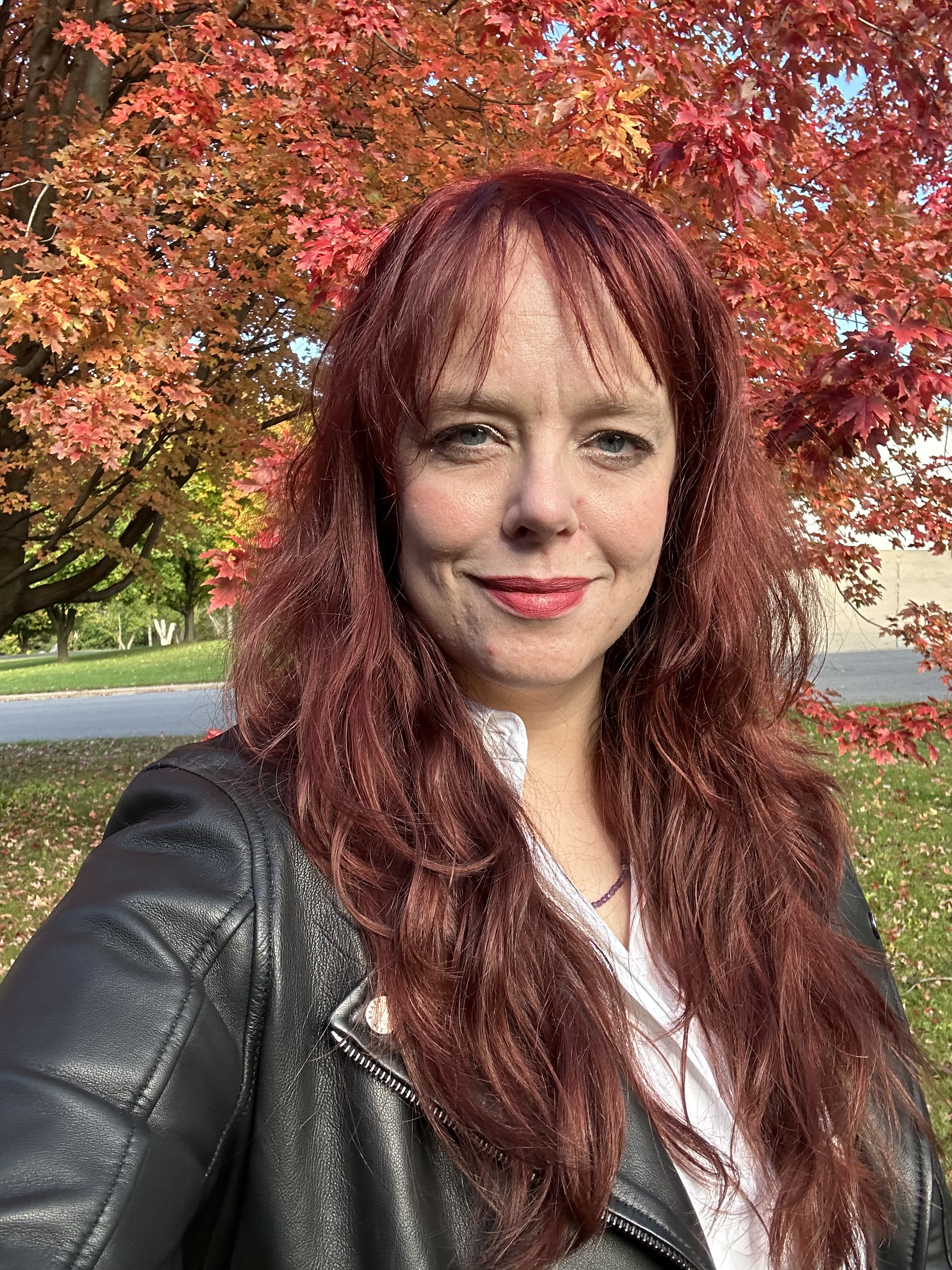
Melissa F. Olson

Melissa F. Olson is an American comic book writer and author, primarily in the urban fantasy genre. She is known for her "Old World" books, which consist of the Scarlett Bernard series, the Boundary Magic series, a number of short stories, and two novellas. She is also the author of Nightshades, a Tor.com trilogy that is unrelated to her other urban fantasy books. Her comics work includes the story "The Tall Tale Tour" in Project: Cryptid and Archaic a 2025 series from Ahoy Comics.

== Biography ==
Melissa Olson was born and raised in Chippewa Falls, Wisconsin, and studied film and literature at the University of Southern California in Los Angeles. After graduation, Olson worked briefly in television development before moving to Madison, Wisconsin. She holds a master's degree in English from the University of Wisconsin-Milwaukee. In addition to comics and fiction, her writing has appeared in newspapers, blogs, online magazines, and academic journals. She has Ehlers–Danlos syndrome.

== Appearances ==
In 2019, Melissa gave a Tedx talk in Orillia, ON called "Rethinking the Friendship Paradigm" which discussed her experience as an author and the parent of a child on the autism spectrum.

Olson is also a panelist and moderator at science fiction and fantasy conventions such as Comic-Con and Dragon Con.

== Bibliography ==
=== Comics ===
"The Tell-Tale Tour," Project: Cryptid

Untitled 2025 Ahoy Comics series

=== Old World novels in order ===
Bold text denotes an entry point into the universe.

Bloodsick (prequel novella, 2014)

1. **Dead Spots** (2012)
2. Trail of Dead (2013)
3. Hunter's Trail (2014)
4. **Boundary Crossed** (2015)
5. Boundary Lines (2015)
6. Boundary Born (2016)
7. **Midnight Curse** (2017)
8. Blood Gamble (2017)
9. Shadow Hunt (2018)
10. Boundary Broken (2019)
11. Born Magic The Diary Of Scarlett Bernard (2020)
12. Boundary Haunted (2019)
13. Old World War (2022)
14. Bloodsport (2025)

=== Lena Dane Mysteries ===
1. The Big Keep (2014)

=== Nightshades ===
1. Nightshades (2016)
2. Switchback (2017)
3. Outbreak (2018)

=== Selected Nonfiction Work ===
"“The Hero and the Apocalypse in Watchmen and Buffy the Vampire Slayer Season 8”

“Dracula the Anti-Christ: New Resurrection of an Immortal Prejudice," published in Images of the Modern Vampire.

The Kaiju is Six Months Early: Colossal and the Course of History" in the compilation Subversive Sci-Fi.

Delayed Reaction: Box Office Bomb Last Action Hero (1993) and the Action Movie Shared Universe" in the compilation Fantastic Flops.
