= Tawny Taylor =

American author

- Born: United States
- Occupation: Novelist
- Writing career
- Pen name: Sydney Laine Allan, Tami Dane, Avery Kaye
- Genres: Fantasy, Paranormal Romance, Erotica, Romance
- Website: tawnytaylor.net

Tawny Taylor is an American author of erotic novels and paranormal romance; many of her over 50 books include strong erotic elements. She also writes under the pseudonyms Tami Dane, Sydney Allen, and Sydney Laine Allen.

Taylor's works include the "Immortal Secrets" series; "My Alpha Billionaire" about BDSM relationships; the "Masters of Desire" series which includes elements of the paranormal; and several stand-alone novels. Her "Sloan Skye" series is written under the name Tami Dane.

== Reception ==
In a 2011 review of Blood of Eden, Publishers Weekly said that Taylor writing as Tami Dane "rejects the usual paranormal tropes without establishing any new ones", describing the story as "a crowded canvas that never achieves high adrenaline or page-turning tension". Publishers Weekly found Blood of Dawn, the third novel in the series, "moderately entertaining" thanks to "a sympathetic lead and a handful of spirited supporting characters".

== Selected works ==
=== As Tawny Taylor ===
==== "Immortal Secrets" series ====
- Immortal Secrets
- Make Me Burn
- Burn for You
- Make Me Shiver

==== "My Alpha Billionaire" series ====
- What He Wants
- What He Demands
- What He Craves

==== "Masters of Desire" series ====
- Dark Master
- Decadent Master

==== Other novels ====
- Real Vamps Don't Drink O-Neg

==== Anthology contributions ====
- The Real Werewives of Vampire County (2011) with Alexandra Ivy and Angie Fox
- The Alpha's Touch Boxed Set

=== As Tami Dane ===
- Blood of Eden (2011)
- Blood of Innocence (2012)
- Blood of Dawn (2012)

== Personal life ==
Taylor is from Detroit, Michigan. She is married and, as of 2013, had seven children.
