= Nicole D. Peeler =

American author and educator (born 1978)

- Born: August 24, 1978 (age 48); Aurora, Illinois, U.S.
- Education: Boston University (BA); University of Edinburgh (PhD)
- Occupation: Novelist
- Writing career
- Period: 2009–2014
- Genres: Fantasy, Romance, Paranormal romance
- Website: www.nicolepeeler.com

Nicole D. Peeler (born August 24, 1978) is an American author and educator, who wrote the Jane True – Tempest urban fantasy series.

== Biography ==
Nicole Peeler has a B.A. in English Literature, Magna Cum Laude from Boston University and a Ph.D. in English Literature from the University of Edinburgh. She was an Assistant Professor of English Literature at Louisiana State University in Shreveport. Currently, she is teaching in Greensburg, Pennsylvania, at Seton Hill University.

== Bibliography ==
=== Jane True series ===
- Tempest Rising, Orbit, November 1, 2009, ISBN 978-0-316-05658-8
- Tracking the Tempest, Orbit, July 1, 2010, ISBN 978-0-316-05657-1
- Tempest’s Legacy, Orbit, January 3, 2011, ISBN 978-0-316-05660-1
- Eye of the Tempest, Orbit, August 1, 2011, ISBN 978-0-316-12808-7
- Tempest's Fury, Orbit, June 26, 2012, ISBN 978-0-316-12811-7
- Tempest Reborn, Orbit, May 28, 2013, ISBN 978-0-316-12810-0
- Something Wikkid This Way Comes: A Jane True Novella, Orbit, January 17, 2012
- The Hound of Bar Harborville (A Jane True Short Story), October 13, 2014
- The Ryu Morgue (A Jane True Short Story), December 16, 2014
- Carniepunk: The Inside Man, Simon & Schuster, January 12, 2015
- Basic Incubus (A Jane True Short Story), February 17, 2015

=== Other novels ===
- Jinn and Juice, Orbit, April 7, 2015, ISBN 978-0316-40735-9

=== Short stories ===
- "Borderline Dead" from Dead But Not Forgotten, Penguin Books, November 5, 2014
