= Tim Pratt =

American science fiction and fantasy writer

- Born: Timothy Aaron Pratt; December 12, 1976 (age 49); Dudley, North Carolina, U.S.
- Occupations: Author, editor at Locus Magazine
- Writing career
- Pen name: T. A. Pratt, T. Aaron Payton
- Genres: Science fiction, fantasy
- Website: www.timpratt.org

Tim Melody Pratt (born December 12, 1976) is an American science fiction and fantasy writer and poet. He won a Hugo Award in 2007 for his short story "Impossible Dreams". He has written over 20 books, including the Marla Mason series and several Pathfinder Tales novels. Her writing has earned her nominations for Nebula, Mythopoeic, World Fantasy, and Bram Stoker awards and has been published in numerous markets, including Asimov's Science Fiction, Realms of Fantasy, Orson Scott Card's InterGalactic Medicine Show, and Strange Horizons.

== Life and career ==
Pratt grew up in the vicinity of Dudley, North Carolina, and attended Appalachian State University, where he earned a Bachelor's degree in English. In 1999 he attended the Clarion East Writing Workshop. She moved to Santa Cruz, California in 2000, and now resides in Berkeley with her wife, Heather Shaw, and son, River. He currently works as a senior editor at Locus Magazine.

She has also contributed to the Science Fiction and Fantasy Writers of America (SFWA) Collection archived at the Northern Illinois University Libraries.

In 2018, the performance of his short story "Six Jobs" at Podcastle won (and declined) the Parsec award for Best Speculative Fiction Story: Small Cast (Short Form).

Pratt is genderfluid and uses any pronouns.

== Bibliography ==
=== Novels ===
==== As Tim Pratt ====
- The Strange Adventures of Rangergirl, Bantam Spectra, 2005
- The Nex, Tropism Press, 2010
- Briarpatch, ChiZine Publications, 2011
- Venom in Her Veins: A Forgotten Realms Novel, Wizards of the Coast, 2012
- Pathfinder Tales: City of the Fallen Sky, Paizo Publishing, 2012
- Pathfinder Tales: Liar's Blade, Paizo Publishing, 2013
- The Stormglass Protocol, 2013 (with Andy Deemer)
- Heirs of Grace, 47North, 2014
- Pathfinder Tales: Reign of Stars, Paizo Publishing, 2014
- Pathfinder Tales: Liar's Island, Paizo Publishing, 2015
- Pathfinder Tales: Liar's Bargain, Paizo Publishing, 2016
- The Wrong Stars: Book I of the Axiom, Angry Robot, 2017
- The Dreaming Stars: Book II of the Axiom, Angry Robot, 2018
- The Forbidden Stars: Book III of the Axiom, Angry Robot, 2019
- Doors of Sleep: Book I of the Journals of Zaxony Delatree, Angry Robot, 2021
- Prison of Sleep: Book II of the Journals of Zaxony Delatree, Angry Robot, 2022
- Starfinder: Era of The Eclipse, Paizo Publishing, 2025

==== As T. A. Pratt (Marla Mason novels) ====
- Blood Engines (#1), Bantam Spectra, 2007
- Poison Sleep (#2), Bantam Spectra, 2008
- Dead Reign (#3), Bantam Spectra, 2008
- Spell Games (#4), Bantam Spectra, 2009
- Broken Mirrors (#5), 2010
- Grim Tides (#6), 2012
- Bride of Death (#7), 2013
- Lady of Misrule (#8), 2015
- Queen of Nothing (#9), 2015
- Closing Doors (#10), 2017
- Do Better: The Marla Mason Stories, 2018

==== As T. Aaron Payton ====
- The Constantine Affliction, Night Shade Books, 2012

=== Collections ===
- Little Gods, Prime Books, 2003
- If There Were Wolves (poetry), Prime Books, 2006
- Hart & Boot & Other Stories, Night Shade Books, 2007
- Antiquities and Tangibles & Other Stories, Merry Blacksmith, 2013
- The Christmas Mummy and Other Carols, 2017 (with Heather Shaw)
- The Alien Stars And Other Novellas, Angry Robot, 2021

=== Edited Anthologies ===
- Sympathy for the Devil, Night Shade Books, 2010
- Rags and Bones: New Twists on Timeless Tales, Little Brown, 2013 (with Melissa Marr)

== Awards and nominations ==
- Nominated, 2018 Philip K. Dick Award – The Wrong Stars: Book I of the Axiom, Angry Robot
- Nominated, 2010 Theodore Sturgeon Memorial Award – "Her Voice in a Bottle", Subterranean Win
- Nominated, 2008 Bram Stoker Award – "The Dude Who Collected Lovecraft" (with Nick Mamatas), Chizine
- Nominated, 2008 World Fantasy Award – Hart & Boot & Other Stories, Night Shade Books
- Winner, 2007 Hugo Award – "Impossible Dreams", Asimov's Science Fiction
- The Strange Adventures of Rangergirl (Bantam Spectra)
  - Winner, 2006 Emperor Norton Award
  - Nominated, 2006 Mythopoeic Award
  - Nominated, 2006 Gaylactic Spectrum Award
- Winner, 2005 Rhysling Award – "Soul Searching", Strange Horizons
- Nominated, 2005 Rhysling Award – "Making Monsters", Strange Horizons
- Nominated, 2004 Gaylactic Spectrum Award – "Down With the Lizards and the Bees", Realms of Fantasy
- Nominated, 2004 Gaylactic Spectrum Award – "Living with the Harpy", Strange Horizons
- Nominated, 2004 John W. Campbell Award for Best New Writer
- Nominated, 2002 Nebula Award – "Little Gods", Strange Horizons
