= Mandy M. Roth =

American novelist

Mandy M. Roth is a New York Times and USA Today American novelist. Under her name, Mandy M. Roth, she writes paranormal romance and cozy paranormal mysteries, and as Reagan Hawk, she writes erotic romance.

== Career ==
Roth has published with Harlequin Spice, Samhain Publishing, Ellora's Cave Publishing, Pocket Books, Running Press, Random House/Virgin/Black Lace, and The Raven Books.

She holds a Bachelor’s of Science in Business from the University of Findlay and a Vocational Commercial Art Degree from Sandusky High School.

Her writing career began in 2004 with the publication of Daughter of Darkness. "Loup Garou" was nominated for Romantic Times BookClub Magazine Review's Choice Nominee for Best Erotic Paranormal/Sci-Fi/Fantasy in 2006. Roth created and organized the Taming the Alpha anthology, which hit the New York Times and USA Today. Taming the Vampire, Taming the Monster, and Alphas for the Holidays were also listed on USA Today.

In 2013, Amazon launched a fan-fiction service called Kindle Worlds, which included properties from Warner Bros. Alloy Entertainment, such as "Gossip Girl," "Pretty Little Liars," and "The Vampire Diaries." Mandy wrote, "The Vampire Diaries: The Talisman Chronicles" for the now-defunct publishing platform.

Spellcasting with a Chance of Spirits was featured on USA Today in 2020. Roth was a long-term member of Romance Writer's of America and was honored for publishing over one hundred titles.

== As Mandy M. Roth ==
=== Grimm Cove Series ===
- Cloudy with a Chance of Witchcraft (2020) ISBN 978-1-94790-8178
- Hexing with a Chance of Tornadoes (2020) ISBN 978-1-94790-8161
- Spellcasting with a Chance of Spirits (2020) ISBN 978-1-94790-8185
- Starry with a Chance of Nightshade
- Jack with a Chance of Frost

=== Daughter of Darkness Series ===
- Daughter of Darkness. (April 2004) ISBN 978-1-4609-6063-9
- The Enchantress (2004) ISBN 978-1-4609-6079-0
- Bella Mia (2008) ISBN 978-1-4609-6100-1

=== Vampyre Production Series ===
- The Valkyrie. Samhain Publishing. (2004) ISBN 978-1-60504-942-7
- Valhalla. Samhain Publishing. (2004) ISBN 978-1-60928-145-8

=== PSI-Ops: Paranormal Security and Intelligence ===
- Act of Mercy. The Raven Books. (2014) ISBN 978-1-71730-786-6
- Act of Surrender. The Raven Books. (2014) ISBN 978-1-5010-3989-8
- Act of Submission. (2015) ISBN 978-1-5146-8869-4
- Act of Command. Raven Happy Hour. (2016) ISBN 978-1-5301-4180-7
- Act of Passion. Raven Happy Hour. (2018) ISBN 978-1-985020-15-3
- Act of Brotherhood. (2018) ISBN 978-1-71716-285-4
- Act of Surveillance
- Act of Freedom

=== Immortal Ops ===
- Immortal Ops. Raven Happy Hour. (2004) ISBN 978-1-5377-6983-7
- Critical Intelligence. New Concepts Publishing. (2006) ISBN 1-58608-735-5
- Radar Deception. New Concepts Publishing. (2007) ISBN 978-1-58608-897-2
- Strategic Vulnerability. Raven Happy Hour. (2011) ISBN 978-1-5404-1335-2
- Tactical Magik. The Raven Books. (2014) ISBN 978-1-62501-081-0
- Administrative Control. The Raven Books. (2014) ISBN 978-1-5005-6940-2
- Separation Zone. The Raven Books. (2015) ISBN 978-1-5089-0080-1
- Area of Influence. Raven Happy Hour. (2017) ISBN 978-1-976431-44-9

=== Immortal Outcasts ===
- Broken Communication (2014) ISBN 978-1-5088-8819-2
- Damage Report. Raven Happy Hour. (2015) ISBN 978-1-5413-5392-3
- Isolated Maneuver. Raven Happy Hour. (2017) ISBN 978-1-5451-3793-2
- Wrecked Intel. Raven Happy Hour. (2019) ISBN 978-1-08-919214-5

=== Paranormal Security and Intelligence Ops: Shadow Agents ===
- Wolf's Surrender. Raven Happy Hour. (2016) ISBN 978-1-5336-5678-0
- The Dragon Shifter's Duty. Raven Happy Hour. (2016) ISBN 978-1-5395-2263-8
- Healing the Wolf. Raven Happy Hour. (2018) ISBN 978-1-79098-251-6
- Out of the Dark. Raven Happy Hour. (2020) ISBN 978-1-947908-13-0

=== Paranormal Security and Intelligence Ops: Crimson Ops Series ===
- Midnight Echoes. Raven Happy Hour. (2016) ISBN 978-1-5407-7288-6
- Expecting Darkness. Raven Happy Hour. (2017) ISBN 978-1-5482-3280-1
- Bound to Midnight. Raven Happy Hour. (2019) ISBN 978-1-947908-09-3
- Bat Out of Hell

=== Bewitchingly Ever After ===
- Don't Stop Bewitching. (2018) ISBN 978-1-71868-838-4
- Everybody Wants to Rune the World. Raven Happy Hour. (2019) ISBN 978-1-947908-08-6
- Do You Really Want to Haunt Me. Raven Happy Hour. (2019) ISBN 978-1-70537-525-9

=== Happily Everlasting Series ===
- Once Hunted, Twice Shy. Raven Happy Hour. (2017) ISBN 978-1-975919-19-1
- Total Eclipse of the Hunt. Raven Happy Hour. (2017) ISBN 978-1-981230-77-8
- An Everlasting Christmas. Raven Happy Hour. (2018) ISBN 978-1-947908-10-9

=== Tempting Fate Series ===
- Loup Garou. The Raven Books. (2006) ISBN 978-1-71724-941-8
- Bad Moon Rising. The Raven Books. (2018) ISBN 978-1-986240-98-7

=== The Guardians Series ===
- The Guardians. The Raven Books. (2007) ISBN 978-1-71725-008-7
- Crossing Hudson. The Raven Books. (2016) ISBN 978-1-62501-127-5
- Ruling Jude

=== King of Prey Series ===
- King of Prey. The Raven Books. (2006) ISBN 978-1-987793-52-9
- A View to a Kill. (2014) ISBN 978-1-5030-1476-3
- Master of the Hunt. (2013) ISBN 978-1-71704-402-0
- Rise of the King. The Raven Books. (2014) ISBN 978-1-62501-011-7
- Prince of Pleasure. (2014) ISBN 978-1-5029-9773-9
- Prince of Flight (2015) ISBN 978-1-71705-294-0
- Under His Wing. The Raven Books. (2018) ISBN 978-1-72403-509-7
- Flight Risk

=== Druid Series ===
- Sacred Places. The Raven Books. (2014) ISBN 978-1-5001-9123-8
- Goddess of the Grove. (2018) ISBN 978-1-71729-064-9
- Winter Solstice. The Raven Books. (2013) ISBN 978-1-4524-5563-1
- A Druid of Her Own. The Raven Books. (2015) ISBN 978-1-62501-101-5
- Seduced by the Highland Werewolf. Raven Happy Hour. (2019) ISBN 978-1-09-086137-5

=== Prospect Springs Shifters Series ===
- Blaze of Glory. (2011) ISBN 978-1-5307-2935-7
- Parker's Honor. The Raven Books. (2013) ISBN 978-1-4524-4741-4
- Gabe’s Fortune

=== Bureau of Paranormal Investigations Series ===
- Hunted Holiday. (2014) ISBN 978-1-5030-0703-1
- Heated Holiday

=== Zodiac Series Gatekeepers Series ===
- Blaze of Glory. (2011) ISBN 978-1-5307-2935-7
- Parker's Honor. The Raven Books. (2013) ISBN 978-1-4524-4741-4
- Gabe’s Fortune

=== The League of the Unnatural Series ===
- Pike’s Peak
- Adam’s Angel

=== Cyborg Desires Series (with Reagan Hawk) ===
- Performance Criteria. Raven Happy Hour. (2006) ISBN 978-1-979531-13-9
- Magnetic Attraction. Raven Happy Hour. (2006) ISBN 978-1-979531-33-7

=== Tipping the Scales Series ===
- Tipping the Scales. Ellora's Cave. (2007) ISBN 1-4199-5598-5
- Licking Fire

=== King’s Choice Series ===
- The King’s Choice (2005)
- The Advisor’s Apprentice (2007)

=== Standalone Titles ===
- Mating Behavior
- Warriors of the Darkness. New Concepts Publishing. (2006) ISBN 1-58608-778-9
- Trust in the Season
- Misfit in Middle America
- Gypsy Nights
- Executive Decision
- Ambient Light
- Sin's Pride. Harlequin Spice. (2010) ISBN 9781426851506
- Dex's Claim. Harlequin Spice. (2011) ISBN 9781426857324
- Eternal Seduction. Harlequin Spice. (2011) ISBN 9781426878916
- Demonic Desires. The Raven Books. (2011) ISBN 978-1-4524-6621-7
- Best Intentions. Samhain Publishing. (2011) ISBN 978-1-60928-127-4
- Dance of Souls
- Peace Offerings

=== Pleasure Cruise Series (with Michelle M. Pillow) ===
- Pleasure Cruise. The Raven Books & Raven Happy Hour. (2005) with Michelle M. Pillow ISBN 978-1-4524-1208-5
- Date with Destiny. The Raven Books & Raven Happy Hour. (2007) with Michelle M. Pillow ISBN 978-1-4524-2843-7
- Pleasure Island. The Raven Books & Raven Happy Hour. (2016) with Michelle M. Pillow ISBN 978-1-4524-6667-5

=== Anthologies edited by Mandy M. Roth ===
- Taming the Alpha (2014)
- Alphas for the Holidays (2016) ISBN 978-1-62501-201-2
- Taming the Monster (2015) ISBN 978-1-62501-121-3

=== Other anthologies ===
- Ghost Cats 2 (2006) with Michelle M. Pillow, Jaycee Clark, and Mandy M. Roth ISBN 1-58608-784-3
- Stop Dragon My Heart Around (2007) with Michelle M. Pillow and Mandy M. Roth ISBN 978-1-4662-5017-8
- Ghost Cats. Samhain Publishing. (2011) with Jaycee Clark and Mandy M. Roth ISBN 978-1-60928-127-4
- Kiss of Christmas Magic (2014) ISBN 978-1-50223-6142
- A Very Alpha Christmas (2015) ISBN 978-1-62501-122-0
- Once Upon a Kiss: 17 Romantic Faerie Tales (2017)

== As Reagan Hawk ==
=== Novels ===
==== Strength in Numbers Series ====
- Strength in Numbers
- Space Pirates Bounty

==== The Beast Masters Series ====
- Trading Teon. Raven Happy Hour. (2012) ISBN 978-1-62501-006-3
- Securing Sara. (2013)
- Rescuing Reya. The Raven Books. (2013) ISBN 978-1-62501-018-6

=== Standalone Reagan Hawk ===
- A King's Ransom. The Raven Books. (2013) ISBN 978-1-62501-046-9

== As Kennedy Kovit ==
=== Blazing Hearts Series ===
- The Bet
- The Cowboy
- The Lover

=== Standalone Kennedy Kovit ===
- Crazy for You
