= Kalayna Price =

Author

- Occupation: Novelist
- Education: University of South Carolina (BFA)
- Genre: Urban Fantasy, dark fantasy, fantasy
- Notable awards: USA Today Bestseller, Maggie Award of Excellence in Paranormal Fiction

Website
- www.kalayna.com

Kalayna Price is an American author best known for her Alex Craft novels, an urban fantasy series about a witch who solves crimes by speaking to the dead.

== Biography ==
Price has a BFA in studio art from the University of South Carolina. She is a member of Science Fiction Writers of America and is a regular contributor to Magical Words, an educational blog for writers written by writers, agents, and editors.

In the US, Price is published by Roc (Penguin USA) and Bell Bridge Books. Her Alex Craft novels are also available through Penguin in the UK, Australia, and New Zealand. German rights language for both series are held by Blanvalet, and it has been announced that French, Romanian, and Polish language rights have been sold.

== Bibliography ==
=== Alex Craft novels ===
1. Grave Witch (October 2010 ISBN 978-0-451-46380-7 )
2. Grave Dance (July 2011 ISBN 978-0-451-46409-5 )
3. Grave Memory (July 2012 ISBN 978-0-451-46459-0 )
4. Grave Visions(February 2016 ISBN 978-140591168-9 )
5. Grave Ransom (July 2017 ISBN 9781452690933 )
6. Grave Destiny (April 2019 ISBN 978-0451416599 )
7. Grave War (November 2020 ISBN 978-1984805959 )

=== Novels of Haven ===
1. Once Bitten (January 2009 ISBN 978-0-9802453-9-4 )
2. Twice Dead (February 2010 ISBN 978-0-9843256-7-2 )
3. Third Blood (cancelled)

=== Anthologies ===
- Ruby Red in Kicking It (2013 ISBN 978-0-4514190-0-2)

=== Audio editions ===
- Grave Witch (April 2011 ISBN 978-1-4526-5184-2 ) -Tantor Media, read by Emily Durante
- Grave Dance (July 2011 ISBN 978-1-4526-5185-9 ) -Tantor Media, read by Emily Durante
- Grave Memory (July 2012 ISBN 978-1-4526-2186-9 ) -Tantor Media, read by Emily Durante
- Grave Visions (February 2016 ISBN 978-1-4526-9092-6 ) -Tantor Media, read by Emily Durante
- Grave Ransom (October 2017 ISBN 978-1-4526-9093-3 ) -Tantor Media, read by Emily Durante
- Grave Destiny (April 2019 ISBN 978-1-4526-9094-0 ) -Tantor Media, read by Emily Durante
- Grave War (November 2020 ISBN 978-1-4945-3122-5 ) -Tantor Media, read by Emily Durante
- Once Bitten (August 2011 ASIN B005G0UZN6 ) – Audible Frontiers, read by Piper Goodeve
- Twice Dead (September 2011 ASIN B005G0V60W ) – Audible Frontiers, read by Piper Goodeve

=== Foreign editions ===
- Der Kuss der Ewigkeit -German edition of Once Bitten (December 2011 ISBN 978-3-442-37854-8 )-Blanvalet, Translated by Anita Nirschl
- Vom Tod verführt – German edition of Grave Witch (July 2012 ISBN 978-3-442-37860-9) -Blanvalet, Translated by Lothar Woicke
