= Darynda Jones =

American novelist

- Born: United States
- Occupation: Author
- Writing career
- Genres: Paranormal romance, urban fantasy
- Notable work: Charley Davidson series
- Notable awards: RITA award – Best First Book; 2012 First Grave on the Right

Darynda Jones is an American author of paranormal romance and urban fantasy, known for her Charley Davidson series. Jones has been a New York Times and USA Today bestselling author, and her work has been translated into multiple languages. She lives in New Mexico.

== Charley Davidson novels ==
Darynda Jones' protagonist Charley Davidson is a private investigator living in Albuquerque, New Mexico but that is not all Charley does for a living. Charley is a portal to heaven and was born onto Earth as a Grim Reaper. Not only can she see the dead but she can touch them. The dead who have lingered around after passing, due to numerous reasons, can see her 'light' from anywhere on Earth. When they pass through her, Charley gets a glimpse of their life, scents, feelings, memories and such.

The first person to pass through Charley was her mother who died giving birth to Charley. Her mother told her she loved her and then passed through Charley. Charley remembers this because her memory extends from the day she was born. One of the first things she can recall is the Big Bad, a being shrouded in darkness who always seemed to be saving her. The books balance humor, romance and suspense.

=== Characters ===
Charlotte/Charley Davidson: The main character who tries to balance life as a private investigator and grim reaper. She lives in a building across from her office, which is above her fathers' bar. From as early as the age of five, Charley has been helping her father, a former policeman, and her uncle Bob, also a cop, solve cases using her reaper abilities. She is sarcastic and has quick wit. She is a portal to heaven for the souls of the departed to cross through. She is able to heal faster than any other human and, when forced, she can move at an inhuman speed. She has the cunning ability to almost get killed in the most unlikely places.

Reyes Farrow: A boy who Charley met when she was younger and tried to save after witnessing him being beaten by his father. At that time, he called her 'Dutch'. Later, she comes across him in prison. He was charged with the murder of his abusive father. Reyes has a large fan base of women who scour prison photos for good looking men. He often visits Charley in her dreams while she was unaware it was him. He is the son of Satan. He was sent to look for a portal to heaven, but once he saw her he wanted to be with her and thus got himself born onto Earth. Just as Charley is a portal to heaven, Reyes, is a portal to hell.

Leland Davidson: Charley and Gemma's father was once a cop. He would get help solving cases with Charley's ability to speak to the dead. Now he owns a bar and allows his daughter to use the second floor as an office for her clients. It took three days for Leland to see Charley after his wife's death but he loves his daughter very much. By the end of the second book, and for most of the third book, Leland's relationship with Charley is strained after he sends a killer after her. Leland knew that Charley would be all right due to some strange events that occurred when Charley was younger. However, he did not warn her and she ended up facing the murderer after being caught off guard.

Cookie: Cookie and her daughter, Amber, live across the hall from Charley. Cookie is her best friend and they work together. Charley does field work while Cookie does the research. They bonded over their love of coffee. Cookie worries about Charley after she stops sleeping, due to Reyes invading her dreams. She does her best to help her in any way. She knows all about Charley's abilities and about Reyes.

Gemma: Gemma is Charley's older sister. The two of them were in competition when they were at university. They are almost estranged and rarely speak. Gemma knows that Charley can see and speak to the dead and is aware of the fact she is the Grim Reaper but hides it. Gemma gets along with her stepmother while Charley doesn't.

Denise: Denise is Charley's stepmother and finds Charley to be an embarrassment. She has never accepted Charley's abilities and hates to be around her.

Uncle Bob: Charley is close to her Uncle who she regularly helps on cases as long as he returns the favour. He has access to things that one would need a police clearance to get. He loves her, stands by her, fears for her, and supports her whenever she needs it. When her father tells her to quit her job, her Uncle Bob stands by her side and promises to talk to him.

Garret Swopes: Garret was told of Charley's abilities by Uncle Bob one night when he was drunk. Garret had a hard time coming to terms with the idea. He dislikes Reyes and his involvement with Charley, just as Reyes hates Garret's involvement. He becomes a close friend to Charley and often helps her when she needs it, and even when she doesn't want it.

Angel: Angel is a 13yr old ghost Charley met on the same night as Reyes. Angel was killed trying to stop a drive by shooting and works for Charley by tailing the suspects. In return, Charley sends the money he would have earned to his mother. He keeps trying to see Charley naked.

Rocket: A ghost who has the uncanny ability to know the names of every person who has died. He lives in an asylum and even though he is old his personality is that of a big kid. He enjoys pretending to scare Charley and gets excited whenever she mentions names. He has a younger sister named Blue, who died when she was little.

== Bibliography ==
=== Charley Davidson series ===
- First Grave on the Right, St. Martin's Press, 2011
- Second Grave on the Left, St. Martin's Press, 2011
- Third Grave Dead Ahead, St. Martin's Press, 2012
- Fourth Grave Beneath My Feet, St. Martin's Press, 2012
- Fifth Grave Past The Light, St. Martin's Press, 2013
- Sixth Grave on the Edge, St. Martin's Press, 2014
- Seventh Grave and No Body, St. Martin's Press, 2014
- Eighth Grave after Dark, St. Martin's Press, May 19, 2015
- The Dirt on Ninth Grave, St. Martin's Press, Jan 5, 2016
- The Curse of Tenth Grave, St. Martin's Press, Jun 28, 2016
- Eleventh Grave in Moonlight, St. Martin's Press, Jun 27, 2017
- The Trouble with Twelfth Grave, St. Martin's Press, Oct 31, 2017
- Summoned to Thirteenth Grave, St. Martin's Press, Jan 15, 2019

=== Darklight Trilogy ===
- Death and the Girl Next Door, St. Martin's Press, 2012
- Death, Doom and Detention, St. Martin's Press, 2013
- Death and the Girl He Loves, St. Martin's Press, 2013

=== Sunshine Vicram series ===
- A Bad Day for Sunshine, St. Martin's Press, 2020
- A Good Day for Chardonnay, St. Martin's Press, 2021
- A Hard Day for a Hangover, St. Martin's Press, 2022

=== Betwixt & Between series ===
- Betwixt, 2020
- Bewitched, 2021
- Beguiled, 2021
- Moonlight and Magic, 2022

=== Reyes Alexander Farrow ===
Brighter Than the Sun, St. Martin's Press, 2015

== Awards and reception ==
- 2012 - Romance Writers of America RITA Award, Best First Book – First Grave on the Right

The manuscript of First Grave on the Right won the 2009 Golden Heart Award for Best Paranormal Romance from Romance Writers of America, an award for manuscripts by unpublished authors. Third Grave Dead Ahead was on The New York Times Best Seller list. Jones has won numerous other awards for her work, including a Rebecca, two Hold Medallions, and a Daphne du Maurier.
