= Jaye Wells =

American novelist

- Occupation: Novelist
- Writing career
- Genre: Urban fantasy
- Notable work: The Sabina Kane Series
- Website: jayewells.com

Jaye Wells is an urban fantasy author. She writes the Sabina Kane series, which is published worldwide by science fiction and fantasy publishers Orbit Books. Before she became a full-time writer, she was a magazine editor and freelance journalist. She lives in Texas with her husband and son.

== Bibliography ==
=== The Sabina Kane Series ===
- Red-Headed Stepchild (April 2009)
- The Mage in Black (April 2010)
- Violet Tendencies (April 2011), a short story
- Green-Eyed Demon (February 2011)
- Silver-Tongued Devil (January 2012)
- Blue-Blooded Vamp (June 2012)
- Rusted Veins (October 2013), novella
- Fool's Gold (October 2014), novella

=== The Prospero's War Series ===
- Dirty Magic (January 2014)
- Cursed Moon (August 2014)
- Fire Water (January 2015), novella
- Deadly Spells (February 2015)
- Volatile Bonds (September 2017)

=== The Meridian Six Novella Series ===
- Meridian Six (December 2013)
- Children of Ash (March 2015)

=== The Murdoch Vampire Series ===
- The Hot Scot (as Kate Eden) (December 2013)
- Rebel Child (as Kate Eden) (December 2013)

=== Short stories ===
- Werewife (July 2013)
- The Bluest Hour (December 2014)
