= Marla Mason =

Series of novels by author Tim Pratt

- the cover of Blood Engines, the first book in the series
- 1. Bone Shop; 2. Blood Engines; 3. Poison Sleep; 4. Dead Reign; 5. Spell Games; 6. Broken Mirrors; 7. Grim Tides; 8. Bride of Death; 9. Lady of Misrule; 10. Queen of Nothing; 11. Closing Doors
- Author: Tim Pratt
- Language: English
- Genre: Fantasy
- Media type: Print; Audiobook; E-book

The Marla Mason series is a series of ten main sequence novels and various prequels and short stories written by American author Tim Pratt under the pseudonym of T.A. Pratt. The books are told mostly through the third person perspective of Marla Mason, the head sorceress of the fictional United States East Coast city of Felport.

Critical reception for the series has been mostly positive, with Locus placing Blood Engines and Spell Games on their 2007 and 2009 "Recommended Reading List" for fantasy novels, as well as nominating them for the Locus Award for Best Fantasy Novel for their respective years.

== Development ==
Pratt began writing the series shortly after moving to the Bay Area and set the events of the first novel in the city of San Francisco. He also said that Blood Engines "wasn’t intended to start a series, but it turns out I accidentally wrote something in a thriving subgenre." Pratt based the character on a childhood friend of his by the same name and describes the character as "an ass-kicking sorcerer who doesn’t wear a leather catsuit, doesn’t suffer from low self-esteem, doesn’t wallow in angst, and is almost always absolutely certain she’s right... even when she’s dead wrong."

The first four books in the series were published by Bantam Books imprint Bantam Spectra, but after the publisher dropped the series Pratt continued publishing the remainder of the series first through serialized versions and reader donations and then through successful Kickstarter campaigns.

Many of the characters that appear directly in stories or novels starring Marla Mason also appear in other works by Pratt without Mason in them. For example, Bradley Bowman and Mr. Zealand appear in "Down With The Lizards And The Bees" and "Life In Stone", respectively, but Marla Mason does not.

== Bibliography ==
=== Prequels ===
1. Bone Shop (2009)
2. Haruspex (2009)
3. Pale Dog (2011)
4. Mommy Issues of the Dead (2011)
5. "Ill Met In Ulthar" (2012)

=== Main series ===
1. Blood Engines (2007)
2. Poison Sleep (2008)
3. Dead Reign (2008)
4. Spell Games (2009)
5. Broken Mirrors (2010)
6. Grim Tides (2011)
7. Bride of Death (2013)
8. Lady of Misrule (2015)
9. Queen of Nothing (2015)
10. Closing Doors (2017)

=== Short story collection ===
- Do Better: Marla Mason Stories (2019)

=== Short stories ===
- Grander Than the Sea (2011, set after Blood Engines)
- Shark's Teeth (2010, set after Broken Mirrors)
- Little Better Than a Beast (2011, set after Poison Sleep)

== Film adaptation ==
In 2008 Pratt announced on his livejournal account that film and television rights to the series had been optioned to Phoenix Pictures. No actors or directors were announced as attached to the project.
