= Andy Remic =

British author (1971–2022)

- Born: Andrey John Remic; 26 July 1971; Manchester, England, UK
- Died: 26 February 2022 (aged 50)
- Citizenship: British
- Education: PhD
- Alma mater: Manchester University & Edge Hill University
- Occupations: Author, teacher and filmmaker
- Spouse: Linda Remic
- Children: 2
- Writing career
- Genres: Thrillers, science fiction and military science fiction
- Notable awards: BA (Hons), PG Cert, PhD
- Website: Official website

Andrey John "Andy" Remic (26 July 1971 – 26 February 2022) was a British author of thrillers, science fiction and military science fiction. He was also an indie filmmaker.

== Life and career ==
Born in 1971 to Yugoslav emigrant Nikolas Remic and British-born Sarah Ann Bragger, Andy Remic was first published in 2003 through Orbit Books with his fast-paced action SF thriller, Spiral, and has since written over twenty novels including the Clockwork Vampire Chronicles (a fantasy series), the Blood Dragon Empire grimdark fantasy novels, and A Song For No Man's Land, dark fantasy set during the First World War. His books have been translated into six languages.

Remic previously worked as an English teacher at Counthill School and Branston Community Academy in Branston, Lincolnshire, England.

Remic wrote and directed indie films, originally for the UK-based independent film company Anarchy Films, then for RAM films, and in 2015 released his directorial debut film Impurity. Recently he made films about the iconic ZX Spectrum computer, notably Memoirs of a Spectrum Addict, which received "Pick of the Month" in Retro Gamer Magazine, followed by Spectrum Addict: LOAD "FILM2" in 2018.

Remic wrote a number of computer games when he was a child, including several text adventures for the ZX Spectrum in the 1980s and early 1990s. Some of these appeared on the cover-mounted cassettes that accompanied Crash magazine, and others were sold by mail order. Many of his games were produced under the name Psychaedelic Hedgehog Software.

Remic died from complications from cancer on 26 February 2022, at the age of 50, leaving behind his wife Linda and two children.

== Bibliography ==
=== Spiral ===
1. Spiral (Orbit, 2003, ISBN 1841491470)
2. Quake (Orbit, 2004, ISBN 1841492043)
3. Warhead (Orbit, 2005, ISBN 1841491748)

=== Combat K ===
1. War Machine (Solaris, 2007, ISBN 1844166163)
2. BioHell (Solaris, 2009, ISBN 1844166503)
3. Hardcore (Solaris, 2010, ISBN 1844167933)
4. Cloneworld (Solaris, 2011, ISBN 1906735573)

=== Clockwork Vampire Chronicles ===
1. Kell's Legend (Angry Robot, 2010, ISBN 0857660160)
2. Soul Stealers (Angry Robot, 2010, ISBN 0857660667)
3. Vampire Warlords (Angry Robot, 2011, ISBN 0857661051)
- Omnibus (Angry Robot, 2012, ISBN 085766204X)

=== Rage of Kings ===
1. The Iron Wolves (Angry Robot, 2014, ISBN 0857663542)
2. The White Towers (Angry Robot, 2014, ISBN 0857663577)

=== A Song for No Man’s Land ===
1. A Song for No Man’s Land (Tor-Forge, 2016)
2. Return of Souls (Tor-Forge, 2016, ISBN 978-0-76538-402-7)
3. The Iron Beast (Tor-Forge, 2016)

=== Standalone works ===
- Serial Killers Incorporated (Anarchy Books, 2011, ISBN 978-1-908328-00-7)
- SIM (Anarchy Books, 2011, ISBN 978-1-908328-08-3)
- Theme Planet (Solaris Books, 2012, ISBN 978-1-90799-211-7)
- Toxicity (Solaris Books, 2012, ISBN 978-1-78108-003-0)

=== Anthologies ===
- Legends 2: Stories in Honour of David Gemmell (NewCon Press, 2015, ASIN B00YMDLVQ8)

== Filmography ==
- Memoirs of a Spectrum Addict
- Spectrum Addict: LOAD "FILM2"
- Memoirs of a Spectrum Addict 2.5: The Lost Tapes
- 8-Bit Wars (in production)
