= Devon Monk =

American writer

- Born: January 9, 1970 (age 56); Eugene, Oregon, U.S.
- Occupation: Novelist
- Writing career
- Genres: Science fiction, Urban fantasy
- Website: devonmonk.com

Devon Monk (born January 9, 1970) is an American writer of urban fantasy novels. She has also published over 50 short stories in fantasy, science fiction, horror, humor, and young adult magazines and anthologies. Monk currently resides in Oregon with her husband, two sons, and a dog named Mojo.

== Published works ==
=== Allie Beckstrom Series ===
1. Magic to the Bone (November 4, 2008, Roc Books, ISBN 0-451-46240-8)
  After Allie's father is murdered, she becomes the prime suspect. She must race to stay ahead of those hunting her and prove her innocence while trying to find her father's killer.
2. Magic in the Blood (May 5, 2009, Roc Books, ISBN 0-451-46267-X)
  Those with high power are unsure where Allie fits in, if at all. Struggling with memory loss creates unique situations, especially as her magic abilities open up.
3. Magic in the Shadows (November 3, 2009, Roc Books, ISBN 0-451-46287-4)
4. Magic on the Storm (May 4, 2010, Roc Books, ISBN 0-451-46327-7)
5. Magic at the Gate (November 2, 2010, Roc Books, ISBN 0-451-46362-5)
6. Magic on the Hunt (April 5, 2011, Roc Books, ISBN 0-451-46391-9)
7. Magic on the Line (November 1, 2011, Roc Books, ISBN 0-451-46428-1)
8. Magic Without Mercy (April 3, 2012, Roc Books, ISBN 0-451-46448-6)
9. Magic for a Price (November 6, 2012, Roc Books, ISBN 0-451-46486-9)

=== Broken Magic Series ===
1. Hell Bent (November 5, 2013, Roc Books, ISBN 978-0-451-41792-3)
2. Stone Cold (April 1, 2014, Roc Books, ISBN 978-0-451-41793-0)

=== Age of Steam ===
Devon Monk has been contracted for at least two books set in the steampunk American West. The books will focus on a cursed bounty hunter in the wilds of the West where steam technology, magic, and gunslingers collide.

1. Dead Iron: The Age of Steam (July 5, 2011, Roc Books, ISBN 0-451-46396-X)
2. Tin Swift: The Age of Steam (July 3, 2012, Roc Books, ISBN 0-451-46453-2)
3. Cold Copper: The Age of Steam (2013, Roc Books, ISBN 978-1-101-61359-7)

=== House Immortal ===
1. "House Immortal" (September 2014, Roc Books, ISBN 978-0451467362)
2. "Infinity Bell" (March 2015, Roc Books, ISBN 978-0451467379)
3. "Crucible Zero" (September 2015, Roc Books, ISBN 978-0451467386)

=== Ordinary Magic ===
1. "Death and Relaxation" (June 20, 2016, Odd House Press, ISBN 978-1-939853-01-1)
2. "Devils and Details" (August 31, 2016, Odd House Press, ISBN 978-1-939853-03-5)
3. "Gods and Ends" (May 14, 2017, Odd House Press, ISBN 978-1-939853-05-9)
4. "Rock Paper Scissors" (June 21, 2018, Odd House Press, ISBN 978-1939853103)
  "Rock Paper Scissors" was originally released as three separate Ordinary Magic Short Stories, later compiled to become book 4:
  1. "Rock Candy" (September 30, 2017, Odd House Press, ISBN 978-1-939853-07-3)
  2. "Paper Stars" (December 3, 2017, Odd House Press, ISBN 978-1-939853-08-0)
  3. "Scissor Kisses" (March 18, 2018, Odd House Press, ISBN 978-1-939853-08-0) Note: ISBN as printed in e-book
5. "Dime a Demon" (June 12, 2019, Odd House Press, ISBN 978-1939853172)
6. "Hell's Spells" (October 12, 2020, Odd House Press, ISBN 978-1939853196)
7. "Sealed With a Tryst" (August 22, 2021, Odd House Press, ISBN 978-1939853240)
  "Sealed with a Tryst" was originally published in the "Dirty Deeds" collection, an urban fantasy collection of various authors. "Dirty Deeds" is no longer available, so "Sealed with a Tryst" was released as a standalone eBook.
8. "Nobody's Ghoul" (June 17, 2021, Odd House Press, ISBN 978-1939853233)
9. "Brute of All Evil" (Unreleased, Odd House Press, ISBN TBD) Note: Expected release 2022

=== Short stories ===
==== Anthologies ====
1. "The Sweet Smell of Cherries" (Allie Beckstrom short story), published in Crime Spells (February 3, 2009, DAW Books, ISBN 0-7564-0538-6)
2. "That Saturday", published in Better Off Undead (November 4, 2008, DAW Books, ISBN 0-7564-0512-2)
3. "Bearing Life", published in Maiden, Matron, Crone (May 3, 2005, DAW Books, ISBN 0-7564-0284-0)
4. "Singing Down the Sun", published in Fantastic Companions (May 17, 1005, Fitzhenry & Whiteside, ISBN 1-55041-863-7)
5. "Peggy Plain", published in Rotten Relations (December 7, 2004, DAW Books, ISBN 0-7564-0239-5)
6. "Moonlighting", published in Fantasy Gone Wrong (September 5, 2006, DAW Books, ISBN 0-7564-0380-4)
7. "Medium on the Rise", published in Deathgrip: Exit Laughing (October 2006, HellBound Books, ISBN 0-9789157-0-4)
8. "Stitchery", published in Years Best Fantasy #2 (July 2, 2002, Eos, ISBN 0-380-81841-8)
9. "Under Her Wing", published in Sword and Sorceress XV (January 1, 1998, DAW Books, ISBN 0-88677-768-2)

==== Collections ====
Devon Monk has sold a collection of her short stories to Fairwood Press.

1. A Cup of Normal
