= Kimberly Frost =

American novelist

- Born: U.S.
- Occupation: Novelist
- Writing career
- Genre: Romance
- Website: www.frostfiction.com

Kimberly Frost is an American author of paranormal romance from Houston, Texas. Her books are published by Berkley Books, an imprint of Penguin Group.

Her debut novel, Would-Be Witch is the first in her Southern Witch series, which is set in the fictional town of Duvall, Texas. The books center on the life of Tammy Jo Trask, a young witch who has trouble controlling her powers. Frost is also the author of the Etherlin series, which features darker, more suspenseful storylines.

As of 2016, Frost has published seven full-length novels and two novellas. She has also written a few short stories that are featured on her website.

== Awards and reception ==
- 2010 P.E.A.R.L. Award for Best New Paranormal Author
- Barnes & Noble featured Must-Read Romance, All That Bleeds
- Colorado Romance Writers Award of Excellence finalist, All That Falls
- New York Times Bestseller List, Tied With a Bow anthology (included Etherlin novella First Light)

== Bibliography ==
=== Southern Witch series ===
- Would-Be Witch (February 2009)
- Barely Bewitched (September 2009)
- Halfway Hexed (February 2011)
- Magical Misfire (aka Southern Witch book 3.5, Penguin e-special novella—April 2014)
- Slightly Spellbound (May 2014)
- Casually Cursed (February 2015)

=== Etherlin series ===
- First Light (prelude novella to the Etherlin series, from the holiday anthology, Tied With A Bow—November 2011)
- All That Bleeds (January 2012)
- All That Falls (June 2012)
