= Meljean Brook =

American author

- Born: Dallas, Oregon, U.S.
- Education: Portland State University
- Occupation: Novelist
- Writing career
- Pen name: Milla Vane
- Period: 2005–present
- Genres: Urban Fantasy Romance, Paranormal Romance
- Notable works: Guardian Series, Iron Seas Series
- Notable awards: RT Reviewers Choice
- Website: meljeanbrook.com

Meljean Brook is an American author known for her paranormal and steampunk romance series. She also publishes under the pseudonym Milla Vane and designs cover art for herself and fellow writers. She is represented by Nephele Tempest at The Knight Agency.

== Biography ==
Meljean Brook was born in Dallas, Oregon and currently resides in Portland, Oregon with her family. Brook graduated from Portland State University with a bachelor's degree in English.

Brook sold her first novella after being contacted by editor Cindy Hwang when she was at Berkley Publishing Group, who read and enjoyed Brook's fanfic.

== Bibliography ==
=== As Meljean Brook ===
==== The Guardian Series ====
Book #	Title	Publication Date	Lovers	Anthology	ISBN
0.5	Falling For Anthony	2006	Anthony Ramsdell & Emily Ames-Beaumont	Hot Spell	
1	Demon Angel	2007	Hugh Castleford & Lilith		ISBN 0425213471
1.5	Paradise	2007	Lucas Marsden & Selah	Wild Thing	
2	Demon Moon	2007	Colin Ames-Beaumont & Savitri Murray		ISBN 0425215768
3	Demon Night	2008	Ethan “Drifter” McCabe & Charlie Newcomb		ISBN 0425219771
3.5	Thicker Than Blood	2008	Jack Harrington & Annie Gallagher	First Blood	
4	Demon Bound	2008	Jake Hawkins & Alice Grey		ISBN 0425224538
5	Demon Forged	2009	Irena & Alejandro		ISBN 0425230414
5.5	Blind Spot	2009	Maggie Winters & Geoffrey Blake	Must Love Hellhounds	
6	Demon Blood	2010	Deacon & Rosalia		ISBN 0425235475
7	Demon Marked	2011	Nicholas St. Croix & Ash		ISBN 0425242692
7.5	Ascension	2011	Marc Revoire & Radha	Angels of Darkness	
8	Guardian Demon	2013	Michael & Detective Taylor		ISBN 0425242692

==== The Iron Seas Series ====
In this alternative history, steampunk series, the Mongol Empire conquered Eurasia and Africa with war machine and nanotechnology. England is freed from their control by the actions of the Iron Duke.

Book #	Title	Publication Date	Anthology	ISBN	Comments
0.4	The Blushing Bounder	Aug 2011 May 2013	Wild & Steamy Novellas & Stories	ISBN 978-0-989461139ISBN 978-1484828137	
0.5	Here There Be Monsters	Aug 2010	Burning Up	ISBN 0425235955	
1	The Iron Duke	Oct 2010		ISBN 0425236676	ebook does not contain 1.5
1.5	Mina Wentworth And The Invisible City	Jan 2012	The Iron Duke	ISBN 978-1101564639	epilogue novella
2	Heart Of Steel	Nov 2011		ISBN 0425243303	ebook does not contain 2.5
2.5	Tethered	Jul 2012	Heart Of Steel	ISBN 978-0425251041	epilogue novella
3	Riveted	Sep 2012		ISBN 0425256049, 978-0425256046	
3.4	Wrecked	May 2013	Fire & Frost Novellas & Stories	ISBN 978-0-989461122ISBN 978-1484828137	companion novella
3.5	Salvage	Jul 2013	Enthralled	ISBN 978-0425253311	companion novella
6	The Kraken King Part One	Nov 2014			start of new series

==== The Kraken King Series ====
1. The Kraken King - Part One (Nov 2014)
2. The Kraken King - Part Two
3. The Kraken King - Part Three
4. The Kraken King - Part Four
5. The Kraken King - Part Five
6. The Kraken King - Part Six
7. The Kraken King - Part Seven
8. The Kraken King - Part Eight

==== Other works ====
- Legends of Red Sonja - Issue #2 (Dec 2013) UPC 725130209290 00211 also in Legends of Red Sonja - Collection Edition
- Frozen (Sep 2014)

=== As Milla Vane ===
==== A Gathering of Dragons series ====
0.5 The Beast of Blackmoor (prequel novella) (Nov 2014) in Night Shift

1. A Heart of Blood and Ashes (Feb 2020)
2. A Touch of Stone and Snow (July 2020)
3. A Dance of Smoke and Steel (no release date)

=== Anthologies and collections ===
Anthology or Collection	Contents	Publication Date	ISBN	Comment
Hot Spell	Falling For Anthony	Nov 2006	ISBN 0425212882, 9780425212882	
Wild Thing	Paradise	May 2007	ISBN 0425215164, 9780425215166	
First Blood	Thicker Than Blood	2008	ISBN 0425224007	
The Mammoth Book of Paranormal Romance	In Sheep's Clothing	Apr 2009	ISBN 0762436514	
Must Love Hellhounds	Blind Spot	Sep 2009	ISBN 0425229599	
Under Her Skin	In Sheep’s Clothing	2010	ISBN 0011119969	
Burning Up	Here There Be Monsters	Aug 2010	ISBN 0425235955	
Steamlust	Forward	Oct 2011	ISBN 978-0425243459	
Angels of Darkness	Ascension	Oct 2011	ISBN 0425243125	
Agony/Ecstasy	Rescue Me	Dec 2011	ISBN 978-0425243459	
Wild & Steamy	The Blushing Bounder	Aug 2011	ISBN 9781466136762	
Agony/Ecstasy	Rescue Me	Nov 2011	ISBN 978-0425243459	
The Iron Duke	Iron Duke Mina Wentworth And The Invisible City	Jan 2012	ISBN 0425244261	novella not included in ebook
Heart Of Steel	Heart of Steel Tethered	Jul 2012	ISBN 0425251047	novella not included in ebook
Novellas & Stories	The Blushing Bounder Wrecked	May 2013	ISBN 978-1484828137	reprint of ebooks: Wild & Steamy and Fire & Frost
Fire & Frost	Wrecked	May 2013	ISBN 9780989461108	
Enthralled	Salvage	Jul 2013	ISBN 978-0425253311	
Night Shift	The Beast of Blackmoor	Nov 2014	ISBN 978-0425273920	
Legends of Red Sonja - Collection Edition	Legends of Red Sonja - Issue #2	Aug 2014	ISBN 978-1-60690-525-8	
