= Colleen Gleason =

American writer

- Born: Detroit, Michigan, U.S.
- Education: University of Michigan (MBA)
- Occupation: Novelist
- Writing career
- Pen name: Colleen Cambridge; C. M. Gleason; Alex Mandon
- Genres: Vampire romance, young adult fiction, science fiction
- Notable work: The Gardella Vampire Chronicles
- Website: www.colleengleason.com

Colleen Gleason is an American writer.

== Biography ==
Colleen Gleason lives near Ann Arbor, Michigan with her husband and children. She has a degree in English and an MBA from the University of Michigan. She started writing in primary school and wrote nine complete stories before selling the first book of her The Gardella Vampire Chronicles series to a division of Penguin Books, which published it in January 2007: the series arrives at a conclusion in March 2009. In 2008 she wrote a short story, a prequel to the series, titled In Which a Masquerade Ball Unmasks an Undead, published first in the Mammoth Book of Vampire Romance, then as Victoria Gardella: Vampire Slayer. Before becoming a full-time writer, she worked in sales and marketing and started her own business in the insurance field.

In 2010, she started the six-novel series The Envy Chronicles, written using the pen name Joss Ware. In 2011, she wrote The Regency Draculia trilogy.

She has also written short stories. In 2010, she collaborated with Mary Balogh, Susan Krinard and Janet Mullany in a paranormal tribute to Jane Austen, writing "Northanger Castle" for the book Bespelling Jane Austen, published on October 1, 2010.

=== Pseudonyms ===
Gleason's writing has spanned genres in part due to her use of pen names in her career. Under the pseudonyms "Colleen Cambridge" and "Alex Mandon", she has written amateur sleuth fiction in historical and international storylines. Under the former nom de plume, she has featured iconic female celebrities in fictionalized stories of their lives, including Agatha Christie and Julia Child. She also wrote the Marina Alexander Adventures series as "C.M. Gleason".

== Bibliography ==
=== Series ===
==== The Gardella Vampire Chronicles ====
1. The Rest Falls Away (January 2, 2007)
2. Rises the Night (June 2, 2007)
3. The Bleeding Dusk (February 5, 2008)
4. When Twilight Burns (August 5, 2008)
5. As Shadows Fade (March 3, 2009)
6. Roaring Midnight (June 18, 2013)
7. Roaring Shadows (August 2015)
8. Roaring Dawn (July 2016)

==== Envy Chronicles ====
1. Beyond the Night (2010)
2. Embrace the Night Eternal (2010)
3. Abandon the Night (March 2010)
4. Night Betrayed (January 2011)
5. Night Forbidden (August 2012)
6. Night Resurrected (May 2016)

==== The Regency Draculia Series ====
1. The Vampire Voss (March 22, 2011)
2. The Vampire Dimitri (April 19, 2011)
3. The Vampire Narcise (May 24, 2011)

==== Medieval Herb Garden ====
1. Lavender Vows (2011)
2. Sanctuary of Roses (March 15, 2011)
3. A Whisper Of Rosemary (April 1, 2011)

==== Stoker & Holmes ====
1. The Clockwork Scarab (September 17, 2013)
2. The Spiritglass Charade (October 4, 2014)
3. The Chess Queen Enigma (October 6, 2015)
4. The Carnelian Crow (July 1, 2017)
5. The Zeppelin Deception (2019)

=== Novels ===
- Siberian Treasure (February 4, 2011)
- The Cards of Life and Death (March 4, 2011)
- The Shop of Shades and Secrets (May 3, 2011)

=== Short stories ===
- "In Which a Masquerade Ball Unmasks an Undead" in The Mammoth Book of Vampire Romance (2008)
- "Northanger Castle" in Bespelling Jane Austen (2010)

=== As Colleen Cambridge ===
==== Phyllida Bright Mysteries ====
1. Murder at Mallowan Hall (October 26, 2021)
2. A Trace of Poison (October 25, 2022)
3. Murder by Invitation Only (September 26, 2023)
4. Murder Takes the Stage (August 23, 2024)
5. Two Truths and a Murder (October 28, 2025)

==== American in Paris Mysteries ====
1. Mastering the Art of French Murder (April 25, 2023)
2. A Murder Most French (April 23, 2024)
3. A Fashionably French Murder (April 29, 2025)
4. In the Spirit of French Murder (April 28, 2026)

==== Quinn & Gates Mysteries ====
1. Murder at Lincoln's Gala (November 28, 2017)
2. Murder in Lincoln's Library (August 28, 2018)
3. Murder at the Capitol (January 28, 2020)

=== As C.M. Gleason ===
==== Marina Alexander Mysteries ====
1. Siberian Treasure (March 5, 2015)
2. Amazon Roulette (April 1, 2015)
3. Sanskrit Cipher (June 15, 2021)

=== As Alex Mandon ===
==== Belle-Époque Mysteries ====
1. Murder at the Champs-Élyssés (December 21, 2016)
