= Kristen Painter =

American novelist

Kristen Painter is a USA Today Best Selling American author, known for her Nocturne Falls and House of Comarré series. Prior to becoming a full-time author Painter worked as a college English teacher, maître d', personal trainer, and jewelry salesperson.

== Series ==
=== Crescent City ===
Crescent City is an urban fantasy series set in New Orleans, which serves as a haven for supernatural creatures. It follows Augustine, a man that spends most of his time womanizing and living a life of relative ease. It is only when his patroness Olivia is attacked by vampires that he is forced to begin working as the city's Guardian and defend it against supernatural abuse. He is paired up with Harlow, a woman coming to terms with her fae nature and to whom Augustine finds himself attracted.

=== House of Comarré ===
House of Comarré is an urban fantasy series set in a world where vampires and other supernatural creatures (called "othernaturals") exist, but try to avoid being detected by the human population, mortals. Particularly wealthy and influential vampires have the ability to purchase comarrés, humans that have been bred to provide blood of exceptional quality for their "patrons". Chrysabelle is a comarré that has fled her home after her patron dies. She runs into Malkolm, a vampire under a terrible curse. As the series progresses the two are repeatedly thrown into danger, courtly intrigues, and wars between the various othernatural factions.

=== First Fangs Club ===
The "First Fangs Club" series is a paranormal fantasy series and follows the character of Belladonna Baron, former mob wife and newly turned vampire. The series gets its name from the support group for newly turned individuals that Belladonna (or Donna as she prefers) joins. Following the "death" of her husband and subsequent turning, Donna must navigate the world of supernaturals and the politics of vampires.

=== Jayne Frost ===
The Jayne Frost series is a mystery series and spin-off from Nocturne Falls. It is set within the same town and follows the titular Jayne Frost, the daughter of Jack Frost. In the series' first novel Jayne is sent undercover to investigate the disappearance of elves from the town's Santa's workshop store. There she runs into her ex-fiancé Cooper and also meets the handsome vampire Garrett, which causes her to become torn between her attraction to both men. By the novel's conclusion Jayne has, under her true identity, assumed managerial control of the store and reconciled with Cooper, with the two agreeing to start as friends.

=== Nocturne Falls ===
Nocturne Falls is a paranormal romance series set in the fictional tourist town of Nocturne Falls, where they attract visitors by year round celebrations of Halloween. This gimmick allows its citizens, primarily supernatural creatures such as witches, vampires, and werewolves, to live semi-freely under the guise that they are only acting to entertain tourists. Each book centers around a different pairing solving various issues and falling in love with one another.

=== Shadowvale ===
"Shadowvale" is a paranormal romance series set in the fictional town of Shadowvale. Shadowvale is a hidden town that does not show up on maps and the town gates only allow in people or supernaturals that it deems worthy. The town is cloaked in perpetual overcast skies due to the original spell that created the town. All citizens of Shadowvale live with a curse. Each books centers around a different pair helping each other either break their curse or learning to live with it.

== Bibliography ==
=== Crescent City ===
1. House of the Rising Sun (2014, Orbit)
2. City of Eternal Night (2014, Orbit)
3. Garden of Dreams and Desires (2015, Orbit)

=== House of Commaré ===
1. Blood Rights (2011, Orbit)
2. Flesh and Blood (2011, Orbit)
3. Bad Blood (2011, Orbit)
4. Out for Blood (2012, Orbit)
5. Last Blood (2013, Orbit)
- Forbidden Blood (0.5, novella, Orbit)

=== First Fangs Club ===
1. Sucks To Be Me (2020)
2. Suck It Up, Buttercup (2020)
3. Sucker Punch (2020)
4. The Sucks Stops Here (2021)
5. Embrace the Suck (2022)

=== Jayne Frost ===
1. Miss Frost Solves A Cold Case : A Nocturne Falls Mystery (2016)
2. Miss Frost Ices The Imp : A Nocturne Falls Mystery (2016)
3. Miss Frost Saves The Sandman : A Nocturne Falls Mystery (2016)
4. Miss Frost Cracks A Caper: A Nocturne Falls Mystery (2017)
5. When Birdie Babysat Spider: A Jayne Frost Short by Kristen Painter (2017)
6. Miss Frost Braves The Blizzard: A Nocturne Falls Mystery (2018)
7. Miss Frost Chills The Cheater: A Nocturne Falls Mystery (2018)
8. Miss Frost Says I Do: A Nocturne Falls Mystery (2019)

=== Nocturne Falls ===
1. The Vampire's Mail Order Bride (2015)
2. The Werewolf Meets His Match (2015)
3. The Gargoyle Gets His Girl (2015)
4. The Professor Woos The Witch (2015)
5. The Vampire’s Fake Fiancée (2016)
6. The Shifter Romances the Writer (2016)
7. The Dragon Finds Forever (2017)
8. The Vampire's Accidental Wife (2017)
9. The Reaper Rescues The Genie (2018)
10. The Detective Wins The Witch (2018)
11. The Vampire’s Priceless Treasure (2019)
12. The Werewolf Dates The Deputy (2020)
13. The Siren Saves the Billionaire (2021)
14. The Vampire's Sunny Sweetheart (2022)
- "The Witch’s Halloween Hero" (2015, #4.5, originally published in Spell of the Ball anthology)
- "The Werewolf's Christmas Wish" (2015, #4.6, originally published in the Hex the Halls anthology)
- "The Vampire's Valentine Surprise" (2016, #5.5, originally published in Kiss and Spell anthology)
- "The Vampire's True Love Trials" (2016, #6.5, originally published in Taming The Vampire anthology)

=== Shadowvale ===
1. The Trouble with Witches (2019)
2. The Vampire's Cursed Kiss (2019)
3. The Forgettable Miss French (2019)
4. Moody and the Beast (2020)
5. Her First Taste of Fire (2021)

=== Standalone novels ===
- All Fired Up (2009, Samhain Publishing)
- Heart of Fire (2010)
- Cowboy In The Kitchen (2010)

=== Short stories and novellas ===
- "Miss Bramble and the Leviathan" (2010)
- "Her Viking Valentine" (All Fired Up #1.5, 2011)
- Dead Man's Hand (Sin City Collectors #4, 2014, Smashwords)
- Double Or Nothing (Sin City Collectors #6, 2014, Smashwords)
