= Twenty Palaces =

Novel by Harry Connolly

- Author: Harry Connolly
- Cover artist: Christian McGrath
- Language: English
- Genre: Contemporary fantasy Urban fantasy
- Publisher: Del Rey Books
- Publication date: September 2009–present
- Media type: Print (Paperback)

Twenty Palaces is a novel series blending fantasy and mystery and written by Seattle author Harry Connolly. Ray Lilly, the series' first person narrator, and protagonist recounts his adventures working for the Twenty Palace Society. The novels have taken place in rural areas in the Pacific Northwest of the United States, as well as Los Angeles.

== Premise ==
Magic is real, along with supernatural creatures such as demons, spirits, and werewolves. Ray Lilly works for a mysterious organization of sorcerers known as the Twenty Palace Society. Their aim appears to be using any means necessary to keep magic out of the hands of anyone other than their own members. Their primary concern is with spell books, which are the source of magic, and with preventing magic users from summoning creatures known as predators from an otherworldly dimension known as the Empty Places.

== Works in the series ==
=== Child of Fire ===
Ray Lilly is the wooden man (a decoy expected to die to allow a sorceress to deal with a predator or enemy sorcerer) and driver of Annalise Powliss, and is under a standing death mark from the Twenty Palace Society. Driving her to Hammer Bay, Washington, Ray helps Annalise uncover a sorcerer, the CEO of Hammer Bay Toys, and his enslaved predator, a Wheel of Fire, that allows Hammer to influence the future. The Wheel is slowly eroding its bindings, enough so that it begins to kill the children of Hammer Bay, using their bodies to build an offspring. Ray eventually kills Hammer and isolates the Wheel. Annalise is horribly wounded during this fight, and Ray manages to resurrect her by force feeding her meat.

=== Game of Cages ===
Ray, detached from Annalise and with new knowledge of several of the spells put upon his body prior to Child of Fire by Annalise, is paired with Catherine Little, an investigator of the Society. Sent to investigate rumors of a predator being sold at auction, Ray and Catherine arrive too late to interrupt the sale, and that the sapphire dog, a predator that feeds by forcing victims to kill one another, has escaped. Ray eventually overpowers two other sorcerers who arrive to contest for the dog, and kills the predator itself, again saving Annalise's life, who arrives after the presence of the predator is confirmed.

=== Circle of Enemies ===
Ray is contacted by former associates in Los Angeles, and discovers all of his friends have been infected with predators to render them invisible. Ray's old nemesis inscribed them the spells to protect them from the predators in henna, which gradually fades, resulting in Ray's friends eventually being devoured. Again working for Annalise, Ray eventually finds the home of a traitor to the Society, and finds the Book of Oceans hidden in the home. Ray reads the Book of Oceans but refuses the gift of magical power. At the end of the book, after killing his nemesis, Ray is invited to the First Palace along with Annalise, as Ray is one of the few people, including the peers, who has actually managed to secure any recent victories.

=== Twenty Palaces ===
A prequel to Child of Fire. Ray Lilly, recently released from prison, is attempting to put his life back together when he becomes involved in a mysterious organization's attempt to stop an old friend from summoning predators from beyond reality.

=== "The Home Made Mask" ===
A novelette published in Connolly's collection Bad Little Girls Die Horrible Deaths and Other Tales of Dark Fantasy.

=== The Twisted Path ===
An ebook novella.

=== The Iron Gate ===
Ray is stuck in a small town that, at first, appears to be stuck in a time-loop. As Ray investigates, though, it turns out to be something much darker.

=== The Flood Circle ===
Ray and Annalise set out to try and recover another of the lost primary spellbooks, but an old enemy returns to get in their way.

== Characters ==
- Ray Lilly is an ex-con who works as a driver and "wooden man" for the Society. His job is to distract enemies so that sorcerers can carry out their duties. Ray's only spells are a "ghost knife," a small piece of paper covered in packing tape and laminated, and magical tattoos drawn on him by Annalise. The ghost knife can cut "ghosts, magic, and dead things", and when it passes through a person it saps their will. The tattoos covering Ray's torso and arms protect him from most physical harm and some spells, cause him to be forgotten by people he encounters, and may have other properties about which Ray is not yet aware. During 'Circle of Enemies' Annalise convinces a peer to give Ray the golem flesh spell, which renders Ray impervious to most injuries provided he eats red meat, which he must now do on a daily basis or begin to die. This also means Ray could live up to 500 years or longer. Ray has also read The Book of Oceans, and while he refused the infusion of knowledge that would've rendered him a primary, it is unclear if this has had any effect on him.
- Annalise Powliss is a peer with the Twenty Palace Society, and the usual person to whom Ray answers directly. She has super-strength and invulnerability, as well as the ability to heal from extensive wounds, and carries disposable ribbons that summon "spirit fire". Appearing to be around twenty years old, she is at least 90 to 100 years older, and has dealt with famous cases, including the Mad Butcher of Kingsbury Run, which occurred during the 1930s.
- Catherine Little is an investigator for the Society. She has no magical powers, and is solely responsible for finding indications of possible predator or magical activity and report in to the Society.

== Magic ==
Magic is almost entirely dependent on rituals or artifacts created by rituals. These can take many forms, and can be performed by anyone with the proper spell form and artifact, though most spells cause incredible pain for the caster during the casting, and are treated like part of the sorcerer who casts them. Ray refuses to loan his ghost knife to an investigator, telling her "you might as well ask me for my thumb." Spells are granted in visions to people who possess one of the three true tomes of magic, becoming "primaries."

There are only three real tomes of magic in the entire world. And they're not really books, but I'm getting ahead of myself. When you read one, you receive visions, dreams. When the sorcerer wakes, he writes down the visions as accurately as he can remember them, and these people we call primaries.

— Annalise Powliss, Game of Cages

As spells or artifacts are then passed from hand to hand, they grow weaker, meaning the same spell performed by a primary is more powerful than the same performed by his apprentice, a secondary. Spells are also known to appear on their own in established spell books.

=== Spells ===
- Closed Way: Provides impenetrability on the covered area, and is one of the more common tattoos - Ray and Annalise both have multiple copies of this spell laid upon them (Annalise by an unknown superior, likely her master, and Ray by Annalise). However, for spellcasters who are weaker than primaries, the tattoo becomes visible (allowing knowledgeable individuals to target exposed areas), and the area becomes less and less sensitive, until it becomes completely numb (Ray has often looked down to realize he's been shot but didn't feel anything because the tattoo blocked it). However, the tattoo isn't an absolute protection; "Tattoo," an infamous enemy of the society, was almost completely covered in them, but was ultimately wounded by the blast from a backfire of his pistol, allowing Ray to finish him off magically.
- The Twisted Path: Appearing as a tattoo on an individual, this spell allows many beneficial effects for a criminal or outlaw. One "on the twisted path" leaves no accurate forensic evidence. Fingerprints won't match, DNA won't come back to you, and witnesses may even identify someone else in a lineup. Ray's spell (placed by Annalise) is apparently powerful enough to subvert digital photography. It's unclear when exactly Annalise cast this on Ray; a knowledgeable individual pointed it out in Game of Cages, but given that he wasn't picked up after Hammer Bay, it stands to reason that Annalise cast it prior to Child of Fire. She also tells Ray once in "Child of Fire" that he need not worry about leaving fingerprints behind for not having worn latex gloves.
- Golem Flesh: Golem Flesh provides an added degree of protection from damage; however, more importantly, it also provides a healing factor that allows for the bearer of the spell to regenerate damage rapidly, provided that they take in fresh meat. However, as a trade-off, the spell requires the consumption of red meat daily, and it is best if the meat is fresh and uncooked, which is disgusting to new recipients of the spell, and takes time to get used to. Until such damage is healed, however, the body of a golem flesh recipient is able to survive long periods of time with horrific injuries - Ansel Zahn survived having part of him sucked into another dimension, and Annalise was able to be revived after being burnt to a husk after the source of the timebending magic was cut off by Ray. Human flesh works well - both Zahn and Wally King are able to consume human flesh to heal damage. In addition, should one consume meat properly on a regular basis, the spell can artificially extend one's natural lifetime - the traditional expectation is often put at "five hundred years," but no one knows exactly how long it would last. The spell takes the form of a tattoo that has some form of spirals and apparently bears resemblance to something, though Ray decides to look away rather than study the spell. Although the spell appears in many spellbooks, this one is only cast on rare circumstances - for it to be effective, a caster has to be exceptionally powerful, and it seems to take something out of said casters, as well. Combined with the risks inherent in creating a powerful, long-living individual, the Society reserves casting of the spell to special circumstances.
- The Iron Gate: Protects one from mental influence both from spells and predators. The spell throbs or even screams with unbearable agony depending upon the severity of the invasion, providing both a warning and something to focus upon to resist the intrusion. Ray's spell is apparently powerful enough to aid him against any predator so far seen, and against any spell seen provided he is aware of said spell from the throbbing. He even resists a spell cast on an object to protect its contents cast by a powerful sorcerer, which makes most individuals look away. In Ray's case, his spell is located below his right collarbone.
- Ghost Knife/Soul Knife: Cast by Ray onto a piece of paper from the book he stole and apparently keeps hidden somewhere. Can be telekinetically controlled. Cuts all non living matter, all magic, and "ghosts" or souls. Use on humans renders them docile and compliant, even apologetic for past aggression. Use on a non aggressive suspect highly magnifies the effect, enough so to make Ray incredibly disgusted with himself in Child of Fire. Seen in Game of Cages cast upon a silver Chinese jian in the possession of a rich businessman. Effects are similar, perhaps even magnified.

Annalise's green ribbons: Causes a massive explosion of green fire that Rays iron gate protects him from Circle of Enemies. Annalise's favored weapon. Kills predators with ease.

Annalise's white ribbons: Knocks a person out who views the sigil.

Various and sundry summoning spells.

== Predators ==
- Cousins: Balls of light that grant health and super-human abilities to their host (e.g., strength, speed, etc.). The predator eats away the brain of the host, but retains the host's personality and memories. These predators appear in the novel Twenty Palaces, the prequel to the trilogy of the same name.
- Wheels of Fire: Fiery wheels made of "grey worms" that exist outside linear time. Proper manipulation of this creature is what allows the Hammers their abilities in Child of Fire.
- Werewolves: Spell cast upon the family police force of Hammer Bay by the Hammers. Allows transformation into a wolf. Effects behavior causing pack mentality and over aggression as well as moral disassociation.
- Ball Lightning or "floating storm": Ball of sentient, electricity hungry lightning. Summoned by Zahn with a magical lightning rod. Shown to be summoned without a circle by killing a person with the rod. Game of Cages.
- Sapphire Dog: This creature has a magical gift for compulsion. To see it is to love it. Can also pass through solid matter. Seen in Game of Cages, and possibly inside the person of Wally King in Circle of Enemies (this is probably what gave him the ability to walk through walls)
- Iron Balls: Golf ball sized iron balls filled with fire that are simply immovable. Think Blob from X-Men. Killed easily with the ghost knife they explode into flame, often killing their fellows. Can bestow the gift of total immovability upon a person they inhabit physically. Seen to inhabit wally king in untold numbers.
- Winds of Air and Hunger or "drapes": Invisible creatures that are sort of like boa constrictors if boa constrictors could totally envelope a person. Attempts to crawl in sinus cavities (nose, mouth, ears). Seen inhabiting multiple people whom they bestow invisibility on. After the person they inhabit dies they open a hole in the ground to the Deeps whereupon they summon exponential numbers of their brethren. Exact curve unknown. First summon in COE brings 2, 2nd brings 3, 3rd brings 4, but after 5 the progression is described as a "swarm".
- Claws in Darkness: Eagle-like talons that come out of voids of darkness. According to Annalise a popular form of guardian for summoners. Fairly resistant to the ghost knife but fall easily to Annalise's green ribbons.

== Publishing history ==
The first trilogy of novels are published by Del Rey Books, a branch of Ballantine Books owned by Random House. The covers are painted by Christian McGrath, who also does covers for The Dresden Files series. In October 2011, Harry Connolly announced that Del Rey had cancelled the series due to poor sales.

In November 2011, Harry Connolly began self-publishing with a prequel to the Twenty Palaces series, appropriately titled Twenty Palaces.

=== Series ===
==== Novels ====
- Child of Fire (2009) (Del Rey)
- Game of Cages (2010) (Del Rey)
- Circle of Enemies (2011) (Del Rey)
- Twenty Palaces (2011) (self-published)
- The Iron Gate (2022) (self-published)
- The Flood Circle (2022) (self-published)
- The Wheel of Fire (intended as the final novel in the series, unpublished as of 2026) (forthcoming)

==== Omnibus ====
- The Wooden Man (2012) (collects Child of Fire, Game of Cages and Circle of Enemies and published by the Science Fiction Book Club)

==== Novellas ====
- "The Home Made Mask" included in Bad Little Girls Die Horrible Deaths (2014)
- The Twisted Path (2017) (self-published, e-book novella)

== Reception ==
Both Child of Fire and Game of Cages have garnered generally positive reviews, and Connolly summarizes and links to both positive and negative reviews at his blog, Twenty Palaces. Child of Fire received a starred review from Publishers Weekly and was subsequently named to their top 100 books of 2009 list. Game of Cages received a starred review as well, and though it did not make the 2010 list, it was named as one of four honorable mentions by the Publishers Weekly sci-fi/fantasy/horror reviews editor. The books are often compared to The Dresden Files series by Jim Butcher, but there are several differences, including the fact that the Twenty Palaces books do not take place in a city.

Critics of the novels are generally concerned by the fact that not enough information has been given about the Twenty Palace Society and the way magic works in that universe.
