= Urban fantasy =

Genre of fiction, subgenre of fantasy

Urban fantasy is a subgenre of fantasy, placing supernatural elements in a contemporary urban setting. The combination provides the writer with a platform for classic fantasy tropes, quixotic plot-elements, and unusual characters without demanding the creation of an entire imaginary world.

Precursors of urban fantasy are found in popular fiction of the 19th century and the present use of the term dates back to the 1970s. Much of its audience was established in the 1930s–50s with the success of light supernatural fare in film and, later, television. The genre's current publishing popularity began in 1980s North America, as writers and publishers were encouraged by the success of Stephen King and Anne Rice.

== Characteristics ==
Urban fantasy combines imaginary/unrealistic elements of plot, character, theme, or setting with a largely-familiar world—combining the familiar and the strange. The world does not have to imitate the real world, but can instead be set in a different world or time. Such elements may exist secretly in the world or may occur openly. Fantastic components may be magic, paranormal beings, recognizable mythic or folk-tale plots, or thematic tropes (such as a quest, or a battle of good and evil). Authors may use current urban myths, borrow fictional technologies, or even invent occult practices, as well as using established supernatural characters and events from folklore, literature, film, or comics.

The urban component is usually found in the setting—typically a large or small city—or even a suburban community in a metropolitan area. Use of contemporary technology (such as automotive vehicles or communications) and everyday community and social institutions (such as libraries, schools/universities, or markets) establish a familiar context. The period in which the action occurs may be the fairly recent past or the near future, but will typically require only casual historical or other special knowledge from the reader. The city-setting is a tool; used to establish a tone, to help move the plot, and may even be acknowledged as a character itself.

Urban fantasy is most often a sub-genre of low fantasy (in which magical events intrude on an otherwise-normal world) and/or hard fantasy (treating magic as something understandable and explainable), and works may be found mixing with sub-genres of, for example, horror, occult detective fiction, or the various "punk" genres. Common themes include coexistence or conflict between humans and other beings, and the changes such characters and events bring to local life. Many authors, publishers, and readers particularly distinguish urban fantasy from works of paranormal romance, which use similar characters and settings, but focus on the romantic relationships between characters.

The YA author Scott Westerfeld distinguished between urban fantasy and a subgenre called elfpunk on the basis that "Elfpunk is pretty much full of elves and fairies and traditional shit [...] Urban fantasy, though, can have some totally made-up fucked-up creatures."

== History ==
=== Predecessors ===
During the late Romantic era, writers of sensational fiction (including Mary Shelley, Dickens, Hoffmann, Le Fanu, Hugo, Poe, Wilkie Collins, Stoker, &c.) wrote supernatural-tinged melodramas to explore social anxieties due to population shifts from farms into industrial centers, novel technologies, and fear of 'foreign' immigrants. Re-imagining the contemporary universe by manipulating one or more social/technical realities gave us popular works by Jules Verne, as well as Doyle's Professor Challenger stories. Jack London's 1908 dystopian novel The Iron Heel preceded H. G. Wells' novel The Sleeper Awakes. Karel Čapek, Aldous Huxley, and even Sinclair Lewis (in his novel It Can't Happen Here) all wrote adventure stories that were post-apocalyptic, and dystopian.

Around the same time, popular mail-delivered periodicals appeared in Europe and the Americas (The Saturday Evening Post (1821), Godey's Lady's Book (1830), and Harper's Weekly (1857)). The success of these magazines led to ones that targeted specific readerships: Boys' Own Magazine (1855), and Argosy (1882) among them. All of these magazines published short and serialized fiction features, as well as reportage, instructional articles, illustration, and opinion. Before WW1, fantasy vied for magazine space with westerns, romance, mysteries, military adventure, comedies, and horror. Writers often published stories in multiple genres - among them Arthur Conan Doyle, Robert E. Howard, Isaac Asimov, and Elmore Leonard. A sought-after hallmark for many of these writers was "realism" - although the stories were outrageously fantastic.

Dime novels also arrived before the Civil War, some of the earliest re-printing serials from magazines. Commonly associated with Western adventure, they also encompassed romance and crime-fiction. Robert deGraff founded Simon & Schuster's Pocket Books in 1939, he distributed not only to the 2,800 US bookstores, but also in more than a hundred thousand drugstores, news-stands, 5-&-10s, cigar stores, groceries, and diners. By doing this, he established a market - not for copies of Shakespeare or Jane Austen - but for collections and book-length versions of popular magazine fiction.

=== Early urban fantasy ===
In 1899, Harper's Weekly editor John Kendrick Bangs altered fantasy parameters with The Enchanted Type-Writer (a series of humorous short-stories supposedly typed by the ghost of 18th century writer James Boswell) - introducing a benign revenant in a contemporary setting. Thorne Smith was successful in 1920s-30s, especially his two "Topper" farces about a middle-aged banker's adventures with a couple of ghosts (subsequently made into films, radio plays, and a 1950s television series); Smith's posthumously released novel The Passionate Witch was made into the 1942 comic cinema romance I Married a Witch by Rene Clair.

Writer Charles G. Finney's celebrated 1935 experimental novel The Circus of Dr. Lao placed mythical creatures in a contemporary setting to examine the society in a small Arizona town. Gruesome cartoons by Charles Addams began exploring the humorous side of horror in the New Yorker magazine around the same time.

Occult detective stories, such as Manly Wade Wellman's John Thunstone stories - written originally during the 1940s -are credited by many current authors for bringing contemporary characters and American settings into the fantasy and horror genres. These early tales, however, differ from current urban fantasy - they present supernatural beings and acts as unnatural, aberrant, and a possible danger to ordinary citizens.

Unknown magazine (1939–1943) was conceived by its editor John W. Campbell as a fantasy equivalent of Campbell's successful Astounding science fiction magazine; its stories often took place in the present and many had a thoughtful "science-fictional" approach. Writers such as Fritz Leiber ("Smoke Ghost", published in 1941), Jack Williamson with "Darker Than You Think" (originally published 1940), H. L. Gold (with his "Trouble with Water", published in 1939) and L. Sprague de Camp's "Nothing in the Rules" (1939) presented ghosts, lycanthropes, gnomes, mermaids, demons and more, in a modern setting, with horrific and/or humorous results. The prolific de Camp and his writing partner, war game inventor Fletcher Pratt, also explored urban material with their stories of Harold Shea in the 1940s and Gavagan's Bar stories in the 1950s.

The 1940s saw a number of comic ghost-movies; some of the best-known today include The Canterville Ghost (re-telling the 1887 story by Oscar Wilde), Blithe Spirit (based on Noël Coward's hit London and Broadway play), The Ghost and Mrs. Muir (based on an R.A. Dick novel), series-fare Topper Returns, Gildersleeve's Ghost, The Smiling Ghost, plus cartoons and short features from The Three Stooges, Olsen and Johnson, Walt Disney Productions and Looney Tunes.

=== 1950s-60s ===
Bell, Book and Candle opened on Broadway in 1950, playing 233 performances before it went on a US tour, then played in London for several years. It was released as a film of the same name in 1958. The 1954 best-selling novel The Year the Yankees Lost the Pennant details a Faustian deal with the devil in major-league professional baseball; it was made into the successful 1957 Broadway musical Damn Yankees (subsequently revived several times), and then into a 1958 Hollywood film. That same year, Irish-American Leonard Wibberley published Mrs Searwood's Secret Weapon, about an elderly British widow haunted by the ghost of a Powhatan warrior during the London Blitz. British spy-novel writers Adelaide Manning and Cyril Coles (under the pseudonym Francis Gaites, but published in the United States as by Manning Coles) produced a series of humorous novels from 1954 to 1958 placing ghostly revenants of Franco-Prussian War era into 1950s Paris and Como. Herman Cohen's teen-horror films for American International Pictures commenced in 1957 with I Was a Teenage Werewolf, combining supernatural characters with the mundane popular post WW2 teen-culture. In 1959, the fantasy/sci-fi TV anthology The Twilight Zone began, after the success of its pilot "The Time Element" appeared as a 1958 episode of Westinghouse Desilu Playhouse.

In 1962, Ray Bradbury published the dark novel Something Wicked This Way Comes, which has been cited as a particular influence by writers Stephen King, R. L. Stine, and Neil Gaiman. The highly successful TV fantasy series Bewitched began its 8-year run in 1964, with its rival I Dream of Jeannie and a less-successful fantasy show My Mother the Car appearing a year later; The Addams Family based on Charles Addams New Yorker cartoons also debuted in 1964. Ira Levin's 1967 novel Rosemary's Baby was a best-seller and critical hit; made into a movie directed by Roman Polanski the following year. Chester Anderson's psychedelic adventure The Butterfly Kid was nominated for a Hugo Award for Best Novel in 1968. Also in 1968, the English translation of Italo Calvino's short-story collection "Le cosmicomiche" made his fantastic tales built around minor scientific details available to the Anglo-American appetite for the new urban fantasy.

=== 1970s–early 1980s ===
After the success of Stephen King's contemporary horror-story Carrie in 1973, the author introduced supernatural characters (vampires) into his next book, 'Salem's Lot (1976), which he has claimed is his own favorite. Retrospective reviews of King's work note that he "brought reality to genre novels", and have remarked that "Jerusalem's Lot is the main character here, a warm-up for what King would later do with his beloved fictional towns of Derry and Castle Rock. We're given a vivid description, details and foibles, before the town is populated with a cast of characters..."

Anne Rice published Interview with the Vampire (a re-working of her own late-60s short story) in 1976 to strikingly mixed critical reviews. Incorporating many genres (horror, eroticism, fantasy, romance, historical fiction), it and its sequels established a new audience for fantasy characters in a real world. Recognizing its potential Alfred A. Knopf editor Victoria Wilson recommended a very substantial advance; later, the paperback rights cost Ballantine Books $700,000.

1972's TV horror-film The Night Stalker spun-off a 1974 occult detective TV series Kolchak: The Night Stalker. It featured a Chicago newspaper reporter uncovering and battling supernatural creatures (e.g. vampires and zombies). He was unbelieved and unappreciated, considered by his boss, colleagues, the police and the public as something between a crackpot or an insane murderer as he struggles with both real and metaphorical demons in each episode.

Isaac Asimov's Azazel stories about a tiny demon (less than an inch tall), most of which were written in the 1980s, take some of their urban character of his mystery stories initially published in Ellery Queen's Mystery Magazine. Dorothy Gilman, a writer known for her genre-merging Mrs. Pollifax "cozy-spy" action novels, wrote The Clairvoyant Countess in 1975 which featured various forms of ESP (and wrote a sequel in 2002).

In the cinema, the re-write of Dan Aykroyd's original 1982 science fiction comedy script for Ghostbusters by Harold Ramis replaced the futuristic setting for present day New York City. This effectively enabled the film to be made, and introduced to the mainstream the idea of fantastical events taking place in a real-world setting. Two years later, Gremlins brought another batch of supernatural beings into our everyday world. At the same time another low-budget supernatural comedy success, Teen Wolf was popular enough to generate a television show, an animated cartoon, and a cinema sequel. Before its run was finished, another general-audience teen comedy with supernatural elements, Buffy the Vampire Slayer, was in production.

=== 1980s and 1990s ===
The term began to come into its present use in the late 1970s; however, its meaning kept shifting during the 1980s and early 1990s. This development is apparent in the increased use of the term in contemporary reviews.

Terri Windling's shared Borderlands universe, made up of a number of anthologies and novels, launched with the eponymous paperback original anthology, Borderland in 1986, followed up by Bordertown, also in 1986. The series was later touted by Neil Gaiman as "one of the most important places where Urban Fantasy began". An article in Tor.com has stated that "some say, Urban Fantasy was born in Bordertown," which provided "young, beginning writers like Charles de Lint and Emma Bull" with a platform. Emma Bull's 1987 urban fantasy War for the Oaks, where fairy factions battle in present-day Minneapolis, also received interest and attention. Both Bull's novel and the Borderlands books emphasized young, poor, and hip protagonists. In this, they had much in common with the usual protagonist of the cyberpunk sub-genre of science fiction.

Sweet Silver Blues, a 1987 novel by fantasy author Glen Cook, began his Garrett P.I. series. These tales chronicled adventures of a hardboiled detective in a contemporary fantasy world, and were among the earliest to use a fantastic "underworld" in place of the criminals and thugs of Dashiell Hammett, Raymond Chandler, and their followers. Prolific author Mercedes Lackey started a series in the waning years of the 1980s with Burning Water, exploring the life of a contemporary American witch.

The Vampire Files by P.N. Elrod featured a vampire detective who begins the series by solving his own murder. Set in Chicago in the 1930s, the 12-book series pioneered the vampire investigator role. P.N. Elrod has authored more than 25 books and edited many anthologies. She has won numerous awards for her work in establishing the UF genre.

Shadowrun, a tabletop RPG with a similar concept to the Borderlands universe appeared. Like those earlier books, Shadowrun took place in a future Earth setting (specifically 2050, in the first edition), after the reappearance of supernatural powers and beings. Players could play humans (cybernetically enhanced or otherwise), elves, dwarves or orcs, all in a dark high tech setting. The more definitely cyberpunk approach (jaundiced and gritty) of the game's universe exerted its own influence.

Anthologist and professor Dr. Martin H. Greenberg sparked growth in urban fantasy by commissioning established authors to write stories for his many fantasy anthologies (among them Wizards, Witches, Devils, and Faeries). The commissioned work was juxtaposed with older fiction; it frequently used supernatural elements in contemporary urban settings.

=== 21st century ===
Several publications and writers have cited authors Laurell K. Hamilton and Kim Harrison as notable contributors to the genre. Entertainment Weekly, USA Today, and Time have recognized the longevity and influence of Hamilton's stories, while The New York Times and Amazon.com have noted the work of Kim Harrison. Author Courtney Allison Moulton has cited Hamilton's early works among her inspirations. Kelly Gay has noted Hamilton, Harrison, and Emma Bull as primary influences. Jim Butcher's The Dresden Files series have been described by Barnes and Noble as "the gold standard" for the genre; one of the books from the series was nominated for the 2015 Hugo Award. N. K. Jemisin's The City We Became features major cities acquiring sentience through human avatars; it won the 2020 BSFA Award for Best Novel and was nominated for the 2021 Hugo and 2020 Nebula Awards.

== Novels ==
=== Adult fiction ===
While adult urban fantasy novels may stand-alone (like Mulengro by Charles de Lint or Emma Bull's War for the Oaks), the economics of the market favor series characters, and genre-crossing allows sales along multiple lines.

Many urban-fantasy novels are told via a first-person narrative, and often feature mythological beings, romance, and female protagonists who are involved in law enforcement or vigilantism. Laurell K. Hamilton's Anita Blake series—which follows the investigations of a supernatural Federal Marshal during paranormal cases—has been called a substantial and influential work of the genre. Kim Harrison's Rachel Morgan novels, also regarded as inspirational works, feature a bounty-hunting "witch-born" demon who battles numerous supernatural foes. Multi-genre offerings combine urban fantasy with other established forms (e.g.: police procedurals, as presented in the Peter Grant stories of Ben Aaronovitch, or the Charlie Madigan series, by Kelly Gay, which explores challenges a police officer faces while trying to balance her paranormal cases with life as a single mother).

In addition to books which present largely independent characters, certain stories feature men and women who are regularly partnered on adventures—often with an underlying romantic element. The Jaz Parks series, by Jennifer Rardin, follows the titular Central Intelligence Agency operative and her vampire boss as they combat supernatural threats to national security. Jocelynn Drake's Dark Days novels follow a vampire named Mira and a vampire hunter named Danaus, who work together to protect their people from a mutual enemy. Night Huntress, a series by Jeaniene Frost, centers on a half-vampire named Catherine and a vampire bounty hunter called Bones, who gradually become lovers while battling the undead.

=== Teen fiction ===
Rather than the professional heroes of adult urban fantasy, many novels for young adult audiences follow inexperienced protagonists who are unexpectedly drawn into paranormal struggles. Amidst these conflicts, characters often gain allies, find romance, and, in some cases, develop or discover supernatural abilities of their own. In Kelley Armstrong's The Darkest Powers series, a group of teens with paranormal talents go on the run while fleeing from a persistent band of scientists. Gone, by Michael Grant, follows an isolated town in which adults have mysteriously disappeared, leaving a society of super-powered children behind. In Unearthly, by Cynthia Hand, a girl discovers that she is part angel and gifted with superhuman abilities, leading her to seek out her purpose on Earth. The Immortals series, by Alyson Noël, follows a girl who gains special abilities after recovering from an accident, and also grows close to a mysterious new boy at her school. Love triangles also play a prominent part in these and several other urban-fantasy novels. Coming-of-age themes and teen 'voices' also often distinguish young-adult urban fantasy from adult books in the genre. Bruce Coville and Jane Yolen collaborated on Armageddon Summer which places a standard teen romance in the middle of an imagined apocalyptic cult.

Boarding schools are a common setting in teen urban fantasy. Rampant, by Diana Peterfreund, follows a group of young women at a cloisters as they train to fight killer unicorns. The House of Night series, by P. C. and Kristin Cast, presents a school where future vampires are disciplined while on the path to transformation, during which several romantic conflicts and other clashes ensue. Claudia Gray's Evernight novels center on a mysterious academy, where a romantic bond develops between a girl born to vampires, and a boy who hunts them. Fallen, by Lauren Kate, revolves around a student named Luce who finds herself drawn to a boy named Daniel, unaware that he is a fallen angel who shares a history with her. Other series, such as Carrie Jones's Need, have characters moving to new locations but attending public schools while discovering mysterious occurrences elsewhere in their towns.

=== Juvenile fiction ===
A helping of the fantastic is often an element in children's literature, but the two major strands of urban fantasy are well-represented in particular.

The hidden-world focuses on stories and characters taking place in a fully-realized domain which operates secretly but simultaneously to the world with which we are familiar. An outstanding example are the Harry Potter books of J. K. Rowling - where our own (muggle) world is unaware of an entire universe of wizards and magical creatures; and intersections of these domains provide plot material and character dimensionality for the action taking place primarily in the magic universe - and so being a type of high-fantasy.

On the other hand, magical charm stories operate mostly in the mundane universe, but where a spell or token provides plot-interest. The protagonist of Robert Lawson's 1945 Mr. Wilmer works as a clerk for a big New York City company - but suddenly one morning he can speak with and understand animals. In the magical stories of Edward Eager, groups of children are granted wishes or transported through time by invoking spells. This makes the stories a variety of low-fantasy.

Possibly the best-known urban fantasy series for children are P. L. Travers' low-fantasy Mary Poppins stories, set in London between the World Wars. As well as eight books, there have been several film and stage adaptations. The high-fantasy Harry Potter phenomenon may soon be in position to overtake Poppins in sales, but not longevity.

=== Paranormal romance ===
Author Jeannie Holmes described differences between urban fantasy and paranormal romance:

The two share 90% of their genre DNA. However, the main differences are this: Urban fantasy focuses on an issue outside of a romantic relationship between two characters. Paranormal romance focuses on a romantic relationship between two characters and how outside forces affect that relationship. The best litmus test to determine if a story is urban fantasy or paranormal romance is to ask the following question: 'If the romance between Character A and Character B were removed, would the plot still stand as a viable storyline?' If the answer is 'yes,' chances are good it's urban fantasy. If the answer is 'no,' it's most likely paranormal romance.

=== Media tie-ins ===
Use of other forms of media has become a common part of the creation and promotion of urban-fantasy works.

==== Music ====
"Sometimes the songs influence the book and sometimes it's the other way around, but either way the playlist eventually comes to epitomize the feeling of the book to me."

— Christina Henry

Several urban-fantasy authors cite music as an inspiration. Certain writers recommend songs or playlists on their official websites, including Courtney Allison Moulton, Jaye Wells, and Sarah J. Maas, who couple their recommendations with links to music-providing services. Publishers have also used music for book trailers, including the trailer for Carrie Jones's Captivate, which features the work of songwriter Derek Daisey.

Original music is also produced. In 2010, musicians Alexandra Monir, Michael Bearden, and Heather Holley (a songwriter for Christina Aguilera's Stripped) collaborated to create songs for Monir's debut novel, Timeless.

==== Video ====
Book trailers are often used to promote urban-fantasy novels. Publishers such as HarperCollins also produce regular video interviews with debuting authors.

==== Comics and manga ====
Adaptations of urban-fantasy novels have appeared in comic books and manga. Among the tales to be adapted are Laurell K. Hamilton's Anita Blake series, Patricia Briggs's Mercy Thompson stories, and Melissa Marr's Wicked Lovely.

== Film and television ==
Works of urban fantasy have been adapted to or have originated in film and television. Aside from popular ghost and horror films from the 1930s-60s, well-known examples include the 1992 series Highlander and the TV adaptation of Buffy the Vampire Slayer, which is regarded as a seminal work of the genre.

Certain staples of urban fantasy novels are also present in television shows. The concept of peaceful coexistence with paranormal beings is explored in the 1996 series Kindred: The Embraced, which focuses on secret vampire clans in San Francisco. Works such as Witchblade present the more common matter of a protagonist attempting to protect citizens.

While urban-fantasy novels are often centered on heroines, television programs have regularly featured both genders in leading roles. Shows such as Beauty and the Beast, The Dresden Files, Forever Knight, Grimm, Moonlight, and Supernatural are based around male protagonists, while other programs, including Buffy the Vampire Slayer, Charmed, and Witchblade, focus largely on female protagonists.

== Video games ==
While most fantasy video games take place in science fantasy or high fantasy settings, the subgenre of urban fantasy has a significant niche in the video game media market.

Many urban fantasy video games such as Final Fantasy VII, Tokyo Xanadu, The World Ends with You series, the Shadowrun series, the Dishonored series, and the Mother series feature urban settings with magical elements.

Urban fantasy video games often include characters from folklores and religions in modern contexts. Games such as The Wolf Among Us, Stray Gods, Folklore, Dark, Coffee Talk, the Megami Tensei series, the Bayonetta series, the Vampire: The Masquerade series, and the Yo-kai Watch series are heavily inspired by folklore and religion. Other urban fantasy video games put a modern interpretation on other fantasy media. The Devil May Cry series is based on Divine Comedy, and Lies of P is based on The Adventures of Pinocchio.

== Authors ==
The following is an incomplete list of notable authors of urban fantasy. According to 2013 statistics by the fantasy publisher Tor Books, among writers of urban fantasy or paranormal romance, 57% are women and 43% are men, whereas men outnumber women by about two to one in writing historical, epic, or high fantasy.

- Ben Aaronovitch (Rivers of London series)
- Ilona Andrews (Kate Daniels series)
- Jennifer Armintrout (Blood Ties series)
- Kelley Armstrong (Women of the Otherworld and Darkest Powers series)
- L. A. Banks (Vampire Huntress series and Crimson Moon novels)
- Holly Black (Modern Faerie Tales series)
- Marie Brennan (Midnight Never Come and In Ashes Lie)
- Sarah Rees Brennan (The Demon's Lexicon series)
- Patricia Briggs (Mercy Thompson series)
- Terry Brooks (Word & Void series)
- Emma Bull (War for the Oaks)
- Jim Butcher (Dresden Files series)
- Rachel Caine (Weather Warden series)
- Dana Cameron (Fangborn series)
- Mike Carey (Felix Castor series)
- Karen Chance (Cassandra Palmer series)
- Cinda Williams Chima (The Heir Trilogy)
- Cassandra Clare (Mortal Instruments series)
- Glen Cook (Garrett P.I. series)
- Jack Dann (Junction, editorial output)
- S. J. Day (Marked series)
- Edward Eager ("Magic" children's books)
- P. N. Elrod (The Vampire Files series)
- J. M. Frey
- Jeaniene Frost (Night Huntress series)
- Neil Gaiman (Neverwhere)
- Kelly Gay (Charlie Madigan series)
- Michael Grant (Gone series)
- Claudia Gray (Evernight series)
- Simon R. Green (Nightside series)
- Lev Grossman (The Magicians trilogy)
- Kate Griffin (Matthew Swift series)
- Laurell K. Hamilton (The Anita Blake and Merry Gentry series)
- Cynthia Hand (Unearthly series)
- Charlaine Harris (The Southern Vampire Mysteries series)
- Kim Harrison (The Hollows series)
- Rachel Hawthorne (Dark Guardian series)
- Kevin Hearne (The Iron Druid Chronicles)
- Mark Henry (Amanda Feral series)
- Tanya Huff (Keeper Chronicles, Blood series, The Enchantment Emporium, Smoke series)
- Faith Hunter (Rogue Mage series, Jane Yellowrock series, and the Soulwood series)
- Charlie Huston (Joe Pitt casebooks)
- Benedict Jacka (Alex Verus series)
- Carrie Jones (Need series)
- Lauren Kate (Fallen series)
- Jackie Kessler (Hell on Earth paranormal romance series)
- Caitlin Kittredge (Nocturne City and Iron Codex series)
- Katherine Kurtz (Adept series)
- Mercedes Lackey (Elves on the Road universe and the slightly steampunk ‘’Elemental Masters’’ books)
- Fritz Lieber (Our Lady of Darkness)
- Megan Lindholm (Wizard of the Pigeons)
- Charles de Lint (Newford series)
- Sergei Lukyanenko (Night Watch series)
- Melissa Marr (Wicked Lovely series)
- John C. McCrae (Pact and Pale web serials)
- Seanan McGuire (October Daye series)
- Robin McKinley (Sunshine)
- Richelle Mead (Georgina Kincaid and Vampire Academy series)
- Scott Mebus (Gods of Manhattan children's series)
- China Miéville (Bas-Lag series)
- Karen Marie Moning (Fever series)
- Devon Monk (Allie Beckstrom series)
- Courtney Allison Moulton (Angelfire series)
- C. E. Murphy (Walker Papers series)
- Joseph Nassise (Templar Chronicles and Jeremiah Hunt series)
- Alyson Noël (Immortals series)
- Mary Norton (The Borrowers and its sequels)
- Jackson Pearce (As You Wish and Sisters Red)
- Marlene Perez (Dead Is... series)
- Diana Peterfreund (Killer Unicorns series)
- Vicki Pettersson (Signs of the Zodiac series)
- T. A. Pratt (Marla Mason series)
- Kalayna Price (Alex Craft series)
- Cat Rambo
- Jennifer Rardin (Jaz Parks series)
- Natasha Rhodes (Kayla Steele series)
- Kat Richardson (Greywalker series)
- Rick Riordan (Percy Jackson and the Olympians series)
- J. K. Rowling (Harry Potter series)
- Lilith Saintcrow (Dante Valentine series, Jill Kismet series)
- Ekaterina Sedia (The House of Discarded Dreams)
- Oh Seong-dae (Tales of the Unusual)
- Thomas E. Sniegoski (The Fallen series)
- Lucy A. Snyder (Jessie Shimmer series)
- Jeff Somers
- Jeanne C. Stein (Anna Strong series)
- Shanna Swendson (Enchanted, Inc. series)
- Anton Strout (Simon Canderous series)
- Mark Teppo (Codex of Souls series)
- Sandra D. Tooley (Sam Casey mysteries, Chase Dagger mysteries)
- P. L. Travers (Mary Poppins books)
- Carrie Vaughn (Kitty Norville series)
- Catherine Webb (Matthew Swift and Magicals Anonymous series)
- H. G. Wells (The Sea Lady)
- Kiersten White (Paranormalcy)
- Terri Windling (Borderlands series)
- Yvonne Woon (Dead Beautiful series)
- Alyssa Wong ("Hungry Daughters of Starving Mothers")

== See also ==
- Contemporary fantasy
- Paranormal fiction
- List of literary genres
- List of genres
- List of urban fantasy novels
