= Erin Pringle =

American writer

Erin Pringle-Toungate (born 1981) is an American fiction writer.

== Career ==
Pringle-Toungate was born 1981 in Terre Haute, Indiana. She grew up in Casey, Illinois and initially studied at Columbia College Chicago in their fiction-writing program, before transferring to study literature and creative writing at Indiana State University, where she had taken classes in high school. She also has a Master of Fine Arts from Texas State University in San Marcos.

Pringle is the author of two collections of stories, three chapbooks, and over fifty stories.

Her sister, Jennifer Rardin, was an American urban fantasy author of the Jaz Parks series.

Pringle lives in Spokane, Washington with her partner Heather and son, Henry.

== Awards and honors ==
Pringle's short fiction has been nominated four times for the Pushcart Prize, named a notable Best American Nonrequired Reading (2007), and in 2012, she was awarded a Washington State Artist Trust Fellowship. She was shortlisted for the Charles Pick Fellowship in 2007 and was a finalist for the Austin Chronicle Short Story Contest and the Kore Press Short Fiction Award in 2012.

== Selected books ==
- (2017) The Whole World at Once, West Virginia University Press (ISBN 1943665575)
- (2009) The Floating Order, Two Ravens Press (ISBN 1906120420)
