= Saving Zoë =

Saving Zoë may refer to:

- Saving Zoë (film), 2019
- Saving Zoë (novel), by Alyson Noël
