= Dark Guardian (novel series) =

- Cover of Dark of the Moon, the third novel in the series
- Moonlight; Full Moon; Dark of the Moon; Shadow of the Moon
- Author: Rachel Hawthorne
- Country: United States
- Language: English
- Genre: Paranormal Romance, Urban Fantasy
- Publisher: HarperCollins
- Published: March 3, 2009

Dark Guardian is a series of young adult paranormal romance novels by Rachel Hawthorne. The books follow a peaceful secret society of werewolves, known as Shifters, who are hunted by an ambitious research organization. Amidst this conflict, several of the teenage Shifters become protectors of their kind while forming close bonds with one another.

== Overview ==
Dark Guardian focuses on a society of werewolves called Shifters, who have maintained a peaceful and secret existence for centuries. Their primary residence is an obscure compound known as Wolford, located within a large forest along the Canada–United States border. Wolford is home to a clandestine, normal-looking mansion, surrounded by a large gate with a keycard system. Upon reaching maturity, some of the Shifters venture outward to live among normal human society, while others work as forest guides, deterring outsiders from the compound.

Within the series, transformed Shifters typically have the appearances of normal wolves, as opposed to anthropomorphic creatures. They possess enhanced strength, senses, and healing, but are vulnerable to silver and attacks from one another. After reaching the age of 17 or 18, depending on gender, a Shifter's first transformation will usually occur during a full moon. Following this event, they are able to initiate the change at will.

Traditionally, a male Shifter will endure the first transformation alone, then choose a female mate prior to her change. If the girl accepts, the male will help guide the female Shifter through her first transformation. A romantic bond is often present between the pair, usually before mating, and occasionally after. Following their first change, some Shifters also become Dark Guardians, who work to conceal and defend Wolford from outsiders.

Each novel focuses on a selected protagonist among the cast, following their relationship with a love interest. Additionally, these characters make minor appearances in the other installments. Each book also expands upon the growing conflict between the Dark Guardians and their enemies, including a research organization called Bio-Chrome.

== Background ==
The series began in 2009, with HarperCollins seeking to publish a new paranormal story. After Hawthorne submitted two scenarios—one involving vampires and the other surrounding werewolves—her publisher eventually chose the latter. The author has stated that the inspiration for the story came to her during a camping trip. While spending time with forest guides, she began to imagine a secret society of werewolves living within the woods.

== Book releases ==
Book #	Title	US release
1	Moonlight	March 3, 2009
The opening novel follows a girl named Kayla, who has grown up away from Wolford and unaware of her status as a Shifter. Upon visiting the area, she grows close to an aloof Dark Guardian named Lucas, and gradually learns of the conflict between the Shifters and their enemies.
2	Full Moon	June 30, 2009
The second installment revolves around a Shifter named Lindsey, who initially enters into an arranged romantic relationship. Soon afterward, however, she finds herself more drawn to another boy named Rafe.
3	Dark of the Moon	August 25, 2009
Dark of the Moon focuses on a bold girl named Brittany, who harbors hidden romantic feelings for her friend Connor. She has long dreamed of becoming a Dark Guardian. However, a mystery arises when she fails to transform at her scheduled time.
4	Shadow of the Moon	March 23, 2010
Shadow of the Moon follows Hayden, a girl with a powerful empathic ability, and Daniel, who is mysteriously immune to her senses. Their bond is tested when Daniel becomes a suspect in a new matter facing the Shifters.

== Reception ==
In a review of Moonlight, Donna Rosenblum of School Library Journal stated that "Hawthorne expertly weaves romance with the supernatural, cloaking them with danger and suspense." She concluded that the story "ends a little too neatly and at times seems a bit rushed. However, the author does a good job giving readers a natural view of the legends and myths behind werewolves and their evolution." The Compulsive Reader labeled Moonlight "an absorbing and quick read," noting that werewolves were often overlooked in YA fiction. The review stated that the novel was "a little predictable at the very beginning," but went on to call it "a very engaging and brisk read that will appeal to reluctant readers and even has a couple of mildly surprising twists as the book works its way up to the climax."
