= Radiance (disambiguation) =

Radiance is a radiometric measure of the amount of light in an area.

Radiance may also refer to:

== Film and theater ==
- Radiance (play), a play by Louis Nowra
- Radiance (1998 film), an Australian independent film
- Radiance (2017 film), a Japanese film

== Music ==
- Radiance / Chi ni Kaeru (On the Earth), a song by Mami Kawada
- Radiance, a 1982 album by Jeff Tyzik
- Radiance (Keith Jarrett album), 2005
- Radiance (Athenaeum album), 1998

== Novels ==
- Radiance (book), a novel by Alyson Noël
- Radiance, a novel by Carter Scholz
- Radiance, a novel by Louis B. Jones
- Radiance, a novel by Catherynne M. Valente

== Other ==
- Radiance (fragrance), a fragrance by Britney Spears
- Radiance (software), a software suite, including a renderer, for lighting simulation
- Radiance-class cruise ship, class of cruise ships operated by Royal Caribbean
  - MS Radiance of the Seas, cruise ship
- The Radiance, a character in the video game Hollow Knight

== See also ==
- Radiant (disambiguation)
