= Giorgia Whigham =

American actress (born 1997)

- Whigham in 2026
- Born: August 18, 1997 (age 29)
- Occupation: Actress
- Years active: 2016–present
- Father: Shea Whigham

Giorgia Whigham (born August 18, 1997) is an American actress. She is best known for her roles as Kat in the first season of 13 Reasons Why, Amy Bendix in the second season of The Punisher, and Blaire in Ted.

== Life and career ==
Giorgia Whigham is the daughter of actor Shea Whigham. She had her first break in the acting world starring alongside Ellery Sprayberry in the 2016 short film Pinky. Following her acting debut, she won roles on a variety of TV shows including Shameless, Son of Zorn, 13 Reasons Why, and The Orville. On September 13, 2017, it was announced that Whigham would join the third season of the VH1 slasher television series Scream as a series regular. She starred in the role of Beth. The third season premiered on July 8, 2019. On February 26, 2018, it was announced that Whigham would appear in the second season of Netflix's The Punisher. In 2019, she co-starred in the film Saving Zoë, which was an adaptation to Alyson Noël’s bestselling young adult novel of the same title, starring alongside sisters Laura Marano and Vanessa Marano. In 2017 and 2022, she guest-starred as Lysella on the first and third seasons of The Orville. In 2022, she was cast as Blaire Bennett on the Peacock series Ted, the television prequel of the film of the same name.

Whigham has stated she enjoys portraying characters with an “edge”. In 2026, she told A Shot magazine, “We’re not one-dimensional beings … We’re confused, angry, and contradicting. I’m drawn to characters you can find yourself at odds with.” She has stated she does not use method acting techniques. She enjoys curating Spotify playlists fitting her character’s personalities.

== Filmography ==
Film roles
Year	Title	Role	Notes
2016	Pinky	Nadia	Short film
2018	Sierra Burgess Is a Loser	Chrissy	
2019	N.I.	Samantha	Short film
2019	Saving Zoë	Carly	
2020	What We Found	Cassie	
2021	Dashcam	Mara	
2023	A Little White Lie	Charlie	
2025	Marshmallow	Rachel	

Television roles
Year	Title	Role	Notes
2016	Shameless	Toria	1 episode
2016–2017	Son of Zorn	Shannon	3 episodes
2017	The Legend of Master Legend	Ashleigh	Television film
2017	13 Reasons Why	Kat	2 episodes
2017	Chance	Pepper	3 episodes
2017; 2022	The Orville	Lysella	2 episodes
2018	Animal Kingdom	Sarah	1 episode
2018	Dirty John	Teenage Denise Meehan-Shepherd	1 episode
2019	The Punisher	Amy Bendix	Main role, 11 episodes
2019	Scream: Resurrection	Beth	Main role, 6 episodes
2020–2021	Legacies	Jade	4 episodes
2020	Into the Dark	Shauna Shore	1 episode
2023	Waco: The Aftermath	Becca Whitsett	2 episodes
2024–2026	Ted	Blaire Bennett	Main role
