= Douglas Sagers =

American politician

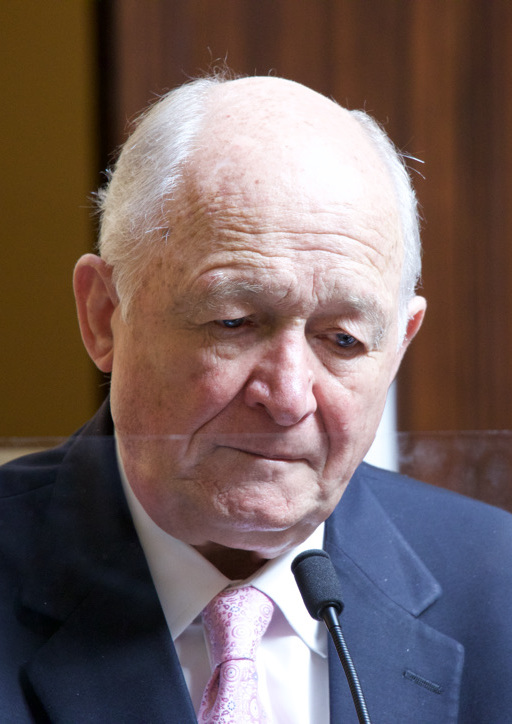

Member of the Utah House of Representatives from the 21st district
- In office January 1, 2011 – December 31, 2022
- Preceded by: James Gowans
- Succeeded by: Tim Jimenez (Redistricting)

Personal details
- Party: Republican
- Website: dougsagers.com

Douglas V. Sagers is an American politician and a former Republican member of the Utah House of Representatives representing District 21.

== Early life and education ==
Sagers received his degree from Brigham Young University. Sagers is a health care executive and served as mayor of the city of Tooele, Utah from 1974 to 1981.

== Political career ==
Sagers was first elected on November 2, 2010. During the 2016 legislative session, he served on the Infrastructure and General Government Appropriations Subcommittee, the House Natural Resources, Agriculture, and Environment Committee, and the House Revenue and Taxation Committee. During the 2022 session, Sagars was a member of the House Ethics Committee, the House Natural Resources, Agriculture, and Environment Committee, and the House Revenue and Taxation Committee. He also served as the House Chair of the Infrastructure and General Government Appropriations Subcommittee.

== Political Positions ==
=== NASA Test Facility ===
In 2016, Rep. Sagars sponsored HCR 23, which would encourage NASA to build a drone test facility in Toole, Utah. Rep. Sagers said the area needs economic diversification, and this project will be "an awesome opportunity for our citizens and our county's economic growth." State economists said it would "provide an economic benefit to the state of at least $250 million." that it would be positive for the state. The bill passed unanimously in both chambers and was signed by the governor.

=== Water Issues ===
Rep. Sagars supports policies aimed at conserving water. In 2022, Rep. Sagars made headlines for drafting legislation that would increase fees for non-agricultural users of irrigation water if levels in the Great Salt Lake descend below certain levels determined in the bill. Later in the session, however, Sagars decided not to officially introduce the bill in the legislature.

=== Education ===
In 2022, Rep. Sagers voted against HB 331, Hope Scholarship, which was a school voucher bill modeled after ones in Louisiana, Milwaukee, and Ohio.

== 2022 sponsored legislation ==
Bill Number	Bill Title	Status
HB 0052	Hydrogen Tax Credit Amendments	House/ filed - 3/04/2022
HB0054	Enterprise Zone Tax Credit Amendments	House/ filed - 3/14/2016
HB0191S03	Revenue Bond and Capital Facilities Amendments	Governor Signed - 3/25/2022

== Elections ==
- 2014 Sagers won the general election against Democratic nominee Rick Pollock with 4,395 votes (64.9%).
- 2012 Sagers was challenged in the June 26, 2012 Republican primary, winning with 970 votes (53.9%) and won the three-way November 6, 2012 general election with 6,795 votes (59.9%) against Democratic nominee David Swan and Constitution candidate William Bodine, who had run for the seat in 2002.
- 2010 To challenge District 21 incumbent Democratic Representative James Gowans, Sagers was unopposed for the May 8, 2010 Republican convention and won the three-way November 2, 2010 general election with 4,732 votes (52.3%) against Representative Gowans and Constitution candidate Jonathan Garrard, who had run for the seat in 2006 and 2008.
