= Jennifer Rardin =

American novelist (1965 – 2010)

- Born: Jennifer Pringle; April 28, 1965; Evansville, Indiana, U.S.
- Died: September 20, 2010 (aged 45)
- Education: Bachelor's degree
- Alma mater: Eastern Illinois University
- Occupation: Author
- Spouse: Kirk Rardin
- Children: 2
- Relatives: Erin Pringle (sister)
- Writing career
- Language: English
- Genre: Urban fantasy
- Notable work: Jaz Parks series

Jennifer Rardin (April 28, 1965 – September 20, 2010) was an American urban fantasy author, known for writing the Jaz Parks series.

== Background ==
She was born in Evansville, Indiana on April 28, 1965, to James and Carol Pringle and started writing at age 12. She graduated from Casey-Westfield high school and in 1987, received a bachelor's degree in English literature from Eastern Illinois University. She married Kirk Rardin in 1986 and wrote three unpublished fantasy novels before starting the Jaz Parks series. Rardin died on September 20, 2010. Earlier that year, before her death, Rardin had announced that she would be working on a new book entitled Book Club Of The Damned.

Her writing influences include Laurell K. Hamilton.

== Bibliography ==
=== Jaz Parks series ===
1. Once Bitten, Twice Shy (2007)
2. Another One Bites the Dust (2007)
3. Biting the Bullet (2008)
4. Bitten to Death (2008)
5. One More Bite (2009)
6. Bite Marks (2009)
7. Bitten in Two (2010)
8. The Deadliest Bite (2011)

==== Jaz Park novellas ====
1. Scouting Jasmine (2011)
2. The Golem Hunt (2011)
3. An Evening for Vayl and Jaz (2011)

=== Other short stories ===
1. The Minion Chronicles: Paul and Brady Get Hoodoo with the Voodoo (2011)
2. Zombie Jamboree (2011)
