= Angelfire (novel series) =

Series of novels by Courtney Allison Moulton

- Cover of the first novel
- Angelfire; Wings of the Wicked; Shadows in the Silence
- Author: Courtney Allison Moulton
- Country: United States
- Language: English
- Genre: Urban fantasy, young adult fiction
- Publisher: HarperCollins
- Published: February 15, 2011
- Media type: Print (hardcover)

Angelfire is a series of young adult urban fantasy novels by author Courtney Allison Moulton, beginning with the entry of the same name. The story follows a teenager named Ellie, who learns that she is actually the reincarnation of a powerful warrior, tasked with aiding angels in their battles against demons on Earth. Amidst this conflict, the tale follows her challenges in adjusting to her newfound role.

== Overview ==
Angelfire introduces Ellie Monroe, a teenager who discovers that the monstrous beings in her dreams, called reapers, are real. A boy named Will reveals that Ellie is the reincarnation of an ancient warrior known as the Preliator, continuously reborn (after falling in battle) to aid angels in their fight against the reapers. With each reincarnation, she becomes more human, though she fails to remember her past lives. Will also reveals himself to be a mystical soldier sent to assist Ellie, having served as her guardian for centuries. Wielding twin khopesh swords, and an immense power called angelfire, Ellie begins a slow journey of adjustment to her role.

== Development ==
Prior to Angelfire, Courtney Allison Moulton's creative background consisted of artwork and photography. She has claimed to draw inspiration from a variety of sources, including film, music, martial arts, and Eastern cultures. Moulton has also noted the influences of R. L. Stine's Goosebumps and Naoko Takeuchi's Sailor Moon, having grown up a fan of both.

=== Conception ===
While watching a film adaptation of The Time Machine, Moulton became curious about writing a character "who wouldn't stop trying to save the person he loves." This led to the creation of Ellie's longtime guardian, Will. "It's his job to protect her even though she's doomed, but she means more to him than just his charge because he's in love with her. He has always kept this secret from her throughout the centuries because he fears how it might complicate their mission and also because it is forbidden by the one who gave him this responsibility," she said.

Prior to creating Ellie, Moulton developed a fondness for stories about "quirky, but strong heroines who have these enormous supernatural destinies". The story of reincarnation was largely rooted in Eastern religion. Being a longtime horror fan as well, the author sought to make monsters the primary antagonists. Building upon these elements, she established Ellie as the central heroine in an ongoing conflict between angels and demons. At the beginning of the series, however, Ellie is presented as a spoiled girl with seemingly questionable priorities. Moulton has stated that her protagonist "is a bit of a reluctant heroine at first, but she really steps up to the plate when she needs to."

=== Combat ===
Angelfire is noted for cinematic fight scenes. In a review of the opening novel, Books Complete Me called the action "unparalleled in YA". While developing the combat, Moulton researched Egyptian and Acadian weapons, ultimately equipping Ellie with a pair of khopesh swords. She has also claimed to draw inspiration from action movies and martial arts, regularly adding her own touch to the finished work. "My characters use a lot of moves I've picked up through watching various martial arts disciplines, but they have many of their own signature moves as well. They each have a bit of their own style, a way of fighting that works best for them and whatever situation they're in."

=== Music ===
Moulton has noted music as a significant factor of her work, citing songs which have facilitated her writing. Regarding Globus's "Preliator", the author has stated, "I write most of my fight scenes to this song." She has also noted Leona Lewis's cover of "Run" while describing the relationship between Ellie and Will. Amidst the release of Angelfire, her Website listed numerous tracks which Moulton recommended listening to during portions of the story, along with links to services which offered such tunes. 15 of these songs were featured in a weekly contest which preceded the release of Angelfire.

== Themes ==
Prior to the series's debut, Moulton was asked about thematic elements in Angelfire. Her response was as follows:

If I had to decide on a theme for Angelfire, it would definitely be freedom and strength of humanity. In a lot of fantasy books, human beings are seen as pathetic and weak in a supernatural world filled with creatures who have supernatural strength. While humans may be physically weaker than other creatures, we have great strengths in so many other ways. We're passionate and reckless and our ability to love is infinite. For the most part, we are free to [choose] our own paths in life and love whom we love. We take all of that for granted and don’t realize the freedom we have until it’s gone.

== Novels ==
Book #	Title	US release
1	Angelfire	February 15, 2011
A teenager named Ellie discovers that she is actually a reborn warrior, tasked with aiding angels in their fight against demons. Allied with a mystical love interest named Will, Ellie joins the battle, but begins a slow adjustment to her newfound role.
2	Wings of The Wicked	January 31, 2012
As the battle against the reapers continues, Will and Ellie begin growing closer.
3	Shadows in the Silence	January 29, 2013
In the series finale, Ellie prepares for her role in the climactic battle.

== Release ==
=== Publicity ===
In anticipation of the series's debut, HarperCollins produced a video interview with the author, while an Internet book trailer was also released. Publishers Weekly reported "strong interest" in the opening novel at the 2010 Bologna Children's Book Fair. In addition, multiple Websites presented contests for advance copies of Angelfire. A large amount of artwork was also created, with several images appearing on bookmarks, cards, the author's Website, and other means of promotion. Many of the images were produced by a DeviantArt user named Yue Wang, while Moulton herself also contributed illustrations.

=== Reception ===
In a review of the first novel, Publishers Weekly commended the "clarity of the fight scenes," likening them to moments from Crouching Tiger, Hidden Dragon. The review called the angelic lore "a bit garbled", and stated that "Ellie can be maddeningly slow on the uptake, but this is one heroine who's happy to take matters (and angelic swords) into her own hands." Kirkus found the story mediocre, conceding that it had a "convoluted but interesting angel angle", but criticizing it for an overabundance of minutiae, exposition, and action. A review from The Bulletin of the Center for Children's Books noted the "intensity and adrenaline" of the action scenes, and stated that "Ellie is likable both as a high-octane heroine and a regular girl coping with family and social drama." The review also called the Biblical mythology "compelling".

The first novel has also received feedback from several young-adult fantasy writers. In an advance review, Cynthia Hand labeled Angelfire "a wild ride and a joy to read." Jodi Meadows applauded the book for exploring both sides of Ellie's life, citing the character's "unwavering loyalty" toward the human friends she protects. She further stated, "I also really, really appreciated that she has to take the time to train, in spite of her natural gifts. And Ellie's friendships remain constant, in spite of a hot supernatural romance budding." She also noted the "exciting" action, and summed up the novel as "solid and mature." Sarah J. Maas described the reincarnation story as "riveting. Riveting and heartbreaking and beautiful". She concluded that "Angelfire has everything you could want in a YA novel—action, romance, humor, realistic teen behavior, incredible world-building—and a lot more." Author Scott Tracey had similar acclaim for the story, stating that "Angelfire has a little bit of everything".
