= Saving Zoë (film) =

2019 film directed by Jeffrey Hunt

- Theatrical release poster
- Directed by: Jeffrey Hunt
- Screenplay by: LeeAnne H. Adams; Brian J. Adams
- Based on: Saving Zoë by Alyson Noël
- Produced by: Ellen Marano; Vanessa Marano; Laura Marano; Jeffrey Hunt; Michael Schreiber
- Starring: Laura Marano; Vanessa Marano; Chris Tavarez; Giorgia Whigham; Michael Provost; Nathaniel Buzolic; Ken Jeong
- Cinematography: Cory Geryak
- Edited by: John Ganem
- Music by: Sae Heum Han
- Production company: Labyrinthe Films
- Distributed by: Blue Fox Entertainment
- Release date: July 12, 2019
- Running time: 95 minutes
- Country: United States
- Language: English

Saving Zoë is a 2019 American crime drama film directed by Jeffrey Hunt from a screenplay by LeeAnne H. Adams and Brian J. Adams, based on the 2007 novel of the same name by Alyson Noël. It stars Laura and Vanessa Marano in the lead roles alongside Chris Tavarez, Giorgia Whigham, Michael Provost, Nathaniel Buzolic, and Ken Jeong, and was released on July 12, 2019.

== Plot ==
Echo, a freshman in high school, is attempting to come to terms with the loss of her older sister, Zoë, who was murdered a year ago. Echo's mother has been abusing antidepressants while her father works overtime. They regularly visit a family therapist, though Echo finds the sessions to be largely unhelpful. Zoë's boyfriend, Marc, was a prime suspect in her murder. Although the actual killer, an internet predator, had confessed and was convicted, Echo remains suspicious of Marc.

One day, Echo comes across Marc's car and sees Zoë's diary in the passenger seat. She shatters the window with a nearby rock to retrieve the diary, and brings it home with her. Once Echo begins reading, she learns of Zoë's plans to move to Los Angeles or New York after graduation to begin a modeling career. Zoë had also ominously written about an unspecified traumatic incident involving her best friend Carley and two older men named Jason and Tom.

Echo enlists Marc's help in infiltrating Jason's house to uncover the truth about what happened to Zoë. After school, Echo accompanies Carley to Jason's, though Carley seems apprehensive about letting her do so. Echo's boyfriend Parker insists on going with Marc once he realizes that she may be in trouble. Marc creates a diversion by crashing his car into Jason's outside, leading to a violent confrontation between the two and allowing Echo to sneak into the basement unnoticed. There, she finds a laptop containing video files of Jason and Tom raping several underage girls, one of them being Zoë. Carley had molested Zoë in the video as well, revealing that she is an accomplice who has been luring underage girls to the men in exchange for drugs.

Echo is caught by Carley, who confesses that Jason and Tom film the videos for their private child pornography website, of which Zoë's murderer was a subscriber. Jason had later blackmailed Zoë, promising to delete her video if she met with his alleged photographer friend for a private photo shoot, leading to her murder. Tom and Jason barge into the basement, knock out Carley, and tie Echo to the bed. They conspire to leave the state, but as Jason begins packing, an injured Marc stands up and knocks him unconscious. Parker arrives just as Echo frees herself, and he calls the police. Tom enters the basement, but Echo knocks him out before he can attack them. The two men are subsequently arrested for their crimes while their website is shut down.

Upon finishing the last entry in Zoë's diary, Echo, now having closure, says a final goodbye to her sister and apologizes for not knowing her well enough. Sitting at a bench at Zoë's favorite spot that has been built in her honor, Echo begins writing her first entry in the diary Zoë had planned to give her as a birthday gift.

== Cast ==
- Laura Marano as Echo
- Vanessa Marano as Zoë
- Chris Tavarez as Marc
- Giorgia Whigham as Carly
- Michael Provost as Parker
- Nathaniel Buzolic as Jason
- Ken Jeong as Dr. Gallagher
- Annie Jacob as Abby
- Evan Castelloe as Tom
- Whitney Goin as Mom
- Jason Davis as Dad
- London Summers as Theresa
- Luke Dampier as Chess

== Production ==
In 2018, it was revealed that the Marano sisters would appear in the lead roles. After joining the project, they commented in an interview with The Hollywood Reporter, "When we optioned Alyson Noël's book Saving Zoe ten years ago, we did it because as a mother, as a daughter, as a sister, and as women, we were incredibly moved by a powerful story. Now, a decade later, that same powerful story seems to be more relevant than ever [...] We are ecstatic that Blue Fox was as moved today as we were all those years ago and are thrilled to be working with them. Together, we hope to share a film that we couldn't be more proud of with the world."

== Release ==
In April 2019, it was revealed the film would be released on July 12, 2019.

== Reception ==
Noel Murray of the Los Angeles Times wrote, "But even with the occasional voiceover narration, the film can't quite replicate the appeal of Noël's original, where a lot of the action is internal, dealing with these women's opinions and feelings. The mystery plot isn't surprising enough — and it takes at least a few good jolts to create the cinematic equivalent of a page-turner." Danielle Solzman of the Solzy at the Movies wrote, "You're certainly welcome to give this film a chance but I left Saving Zoë feeling quite a bit disappointed. I do not see this film as being a complete disappointment but I believe that it could have been executed better. Saving Zoë honestly should have stayed a book." Jennie Kermode of the Eye for Film wrote, "Saving Zoe is, ultimately, a lightweight film about a serious subject. It's competently handled and Marano is an effective lead. It's likely to hit all the important notes for fans of the book but it does little more, avoiding risks and thereby failing to find a voice of its own. If you're in the target audience, then you'll find this a satisfying watch but it will be unlikely to stay with you."
