= Marshmallow (film) =

- Release poster
- Directed by: Daniel DelPurgatorio
- Written by: Andy Greskoviak
- Produced by: Warner Davis; Todd M. Friedman
- Starring: Kue Lawrence; Kai Cech; Winston Vengapally; Miya Cech; Giorgia Whigham; Max Malas; Maxwell Whittington-Cooper; Pierson Fodé; Alysia Reiner; Corbin Bernsen; Paul Soter
- Cinematography: Filip Vandewal
- Edited by: Andy Palmer
- Music by: Nicholas Elert
- Production companies: Hemlock Circle Productions; The Warner Davis Company
- Distributed by: Hemlock Circle Productions
- Release date: March 29, 2025
- Running time: 93 minutes
- Country: United States
- Language: English

Marshmallow is a 2025 American science fiction horror film written by Andy Greskoviak, directed by Daniel DelPurgatorio and starring Kue Lawrence, Kai Cech, Giorgia Whigham, Max Malas, Maxwell Whittington-Cooper, Pierson Fodé, Winston Vengapally, Samantha Neyland Trumbo, Alysia Reiner, Corbin Bernsen and Paul Soter.

== Plot ==
Morgan awakens from a recurring drowning nightmare with sleep paralysis as his bedroom floods from a gash in his abdomen. Shy and lonely, his timid attempt to befriend three older boys is cruelly rebuffed as his grandfather watches from their driveway.

After his grandfather dies in front of him, Morgan's parents insist on sending him to a pre-arranged summer camp instead of letting him grieve with support from his parents. While his recurring drowning nightmare develops in a pathological fear of water at the camp, Morgan makes new friends, experiences bullying from a boy named C.J. and meets a girl named Pilar.

One night during a campfire, the staff at the camp tell a spooky story involving a doctor who takes children who don't stay in their bunks at night and performs horrible operations on them in the basement of his building.

Morgan ventures out at night after seeing strange flashing coming from a building and enters to find a basement where it appears the story is true. Morgan sees the doctor and tries to convince his friends he is real. As children panic, the doctor stalks them and zaps them unconscious with an electrically-powered wand.

As Morgan and his friends try to find somewhere safe to hide, one of the staff members helps them by giving them the security code to the main camp staff building. One child escapes to a main road and hails a police car which brings her back to camp, where the police officer hands the child over to be zapped.

As the staff regroup at the main building and find Morgan, it is revealed that he and the other kids at the camp had all died tragically in different circumstances and were being 'recreated' using a new technology for the families who lost them. The camp, and many like it around the country, were being used to 'grow' the kids and 'program' them before returning them back to their families.

The staff wipe the kids' memories of the night, however Morgan and Pilar are given the option by the sympathetic staff member to remember what happened.

The next day, everything seems to be back to normal as if nothing happened, except for injuries to staff members which are explained to the curious kids.

It is revealed at the end that the bullying Morgan and another boy experienced from C.J. were early signs that the created 'kids' have a fault and are starting to show malfunctions at all the camps as if something is going very wrong with their programming.

== Cast ==
- Kue Lawrence as Morgan
- Kai Cech as Pilar
- Max Malas as Dirk
- Winston Vengapally as Raj
- Miya Cech as May
- Corbin Bernsen as Roy
- Paul Soter as Collins
- Giorgia Whigham as Rachel
- Alysia Reiner as Morgan's mom
- Maxwell Whittington-Cooper as Franklin
- Pierson Fodé as Kazswar

== Production ==
In May 2023, it was announced that Kue Lawrence, Kai Cech, Max Malas and Corbin Bernsen were cast in the film. In June that same year, it was announced that Paul Soter, Giorgia Whigham, Alysia Reiner and Maxwell Whittington-Cooper were cast in the film.

The film was shot in Carroll County, Kentucky in May and June 2023.

== Release ==
Marshmallow premiered on March 29, 2025, at the Panic Fest film festival in Kansas City, Missouri. The film was released in U.S. theaters on April 11, 2025, by distributor Hemlock Circle Productions.

== Reception ==
On Rotten Tomatoes it has a 83% rating based on reviews from 12 critics.

Matt Konopka of Dread Central gave it a 3 out of 5 rating, and wrote: " Convoluted and absurd as this grim summer camp slasher meets Goosebumps story becomes, it nonetheless resonates at a time when one too many adolescents aren’t being told the truth about the society they exist in." Kat Hughes of The Hollywood News gave it a 4 out of 5 rating, calling it "A new spin on an old classic". In a more negative review, Frank Swietek of One Guy's Opinion called it a "mash-up of horror and sci-fi [that] proves ultimately less than the sum of its many parts."

== Sequel ==
A sequel was announced in January 2026, with director DelPurgatorio and actors Lawrence, Cech, Malas, and Friedman all returning.
