= Need (novel series) =

Novel series by Carrie Jones

- Cover of Need, the first novel in the series
- Need; Captivate; Entice; Endure
- Author: Carrie Jones
- Country: United States
- Language: English
- Genre: Fantasy novels
- Publisher: Bloomsbury USA
- Published: December 23, 2008; January 5, 2010; December 14, 2010; May 8, 2012
- Media type: Print, ebook, audiobook
- No. of books: 4

Need is a series of young adult urban fantasy novels by American author Carrie Jones, beginning with the inaugural entry of the same name. The focus of the story is a teenage girl named Zara, who joins a struggle against a society of malicious pixies. As the books progress, Zara encounters a series of personal challenges, and bonds with new friends and romantic interests.

== Overview ==
The series follows Zara White, a strong-willed girl who is prone to helping others. Following the death of her stepfather, she is sent to live with her step-grandmother in Maine as part of her recovery. Zara discovers that her new town is home to a slew of vicious pixies, headed by a king, and becomes a prominent figure in the opposition. Amidst the conflict, she meets several new friends and allies, including a paranormal romantic interest named Nick.

== Background ==
=== Story development ===
Author Carrie Jones has claimed that she was inspired to write the story upon seeing a peculiarly dressed person at a fair, after which she began to envision certain images and scenarios within the tale. The author was particularly interested in writing about pixies, believing them to be a largely unexplored subject in folklore.

An audio book for the first novel began production in 2009, with actress Julia Whelan providing the voice of Zara. In a 2010 interview with The Hiding Spot, Jones stated that the series would likely run for at least four books, and that she had researched Norse mythology and pixie mythology while developing the second novel, Captivate.

=== Characters ===
During a 2009 interview, Jones discussed her motivations in creating and developing the character of Zara.

A lot of contemporary fantasy novels for adults have incredibly confident, butt-kicking heroines but that dominance hasn't completely taken over the young adult genre. There are still a lot of damsels in distress, which is okay, but I wanted some variety, some female leads who become tough and still are girls, who have bravery and empathy. Zara's development is like those adult protagonists for a reason. Girls deserve stories where the butt-kicking and the saving isn't ALWAYS done by the guys. They deserve stories where the female isn't always the damsel in distress. She can be in distress sometimes, but not all the time.

According to the author, many of the male characters were inspired by actual people in her life, which facilitated her efforts to make them three-dimensional.

Zara

Zara is a strong-willed girl with a tendency to help others. She and often takes note of various phobias which she discovers around her. At the beginning of the story, she moves to Maine to live with her grandmother while recovering from the loss of her stepfather. She states that before coming to Maine, she wouldn't really have cared if she had died. Soon afterward, she meets several new friends, and learns of a struggle against violent pixies within her town. Zara is most notable for her various quirks, such as being half pixie [later full pixie after Astley pixie-kissed her], wearing vintage band concert t-shirt the vast majority of the time and jeans with holes and peace signs, her short stature and running ability, and even her unusual name, which means 'princess'.

Nick

A boy who Zara meets upon moving, Nick is a werewolf who becomes deeply engaged in the struggle against the pixies. He is something of a loner, but shares a romantic relationship and a close bond with Zara amidst the conflict. Despite his slight loner nature, he protects others, but to a different degree than Zara. He is described as tall and attractive. His father is a shifter but it is later revealed in "Captivate" that Nick's parents are dead. He has a major temper and an even more major tendency to do reckless things in order to save others.

Grandma Betty

Betty is the family member who Zara lives with upon her arrival in Maine. She possesses an unusual array of talents for her age, and supports those who oppose the pixies. She is also a "were" who can turn into a tiger. She is the town paramedic, so is constantly being called away in a medical state of emergency. She is a terrible cook. She usually wears plaid flanell shirts, despite being a grandmother. Despite these various quirks, she is also a strong grandmother to Zara.

Isabelle

A friend of Zara's, Issie is a pleasant and cheerful presence within the story. She is known at school as the "hyper girl", and Zara thinks she's very childishly cute. She has wild brownish hair, and a bright style. She has a love of bunny rabbits. She also has a romantic interest in her friend Devyn. While being a human without any notable abilities, she provides aid to all of her friends in the fight against the pixies.

Devyn

A brainy boy who researches the pixies, Devyn provides the group with intellectual assistance. Devyn, also like Nick, is part were, and is capable of transforming into an eagle. He was paralyzed from the waist down when an arrow lodged into his spine. But because of a were's healing abilities, he recovers rather quickly from the injury. He and Issie are suggested to have romantic feelings for each other.

Astley

Astley is a pixie king, and romantic interest of Zara's, with ambiguous intentions. It is eventually revealed that he wishes to make Zara his queen. He is Zara's lover and best friend.

Cassidy

Introduced in the second book, Cassidy is an elf/human hybrid who possesses an ability to see the future. Her bond with Devyn eventually makes Issie jealous. However, she gradually becomes a close friend of Issie's, and bonds with the others as well.

Ian

Ian is the once innocent friend of Zara. Ian is killed by Betty for attempting to turn Zara to his side, the pixie side.

== Book releases ==
Book #	Title	US release
1	Need	December 23, 2008
Need introduces a teenager named Zara White, who moves to Maine and discovers that a group of violent pixies populate her town. Amidst the ensuing conflict, Zara makes several new friends, including a romantic interest named Nick.
2	Captivate	January 5, 2010
Captivate focuses on the aftermath of the battle in Need. The story finds a slew of new pixies arriving in Maine, including a new king named Astley, who becomes an ally of Zara's.
3	Entice	December 14, 2010
Entice focuses on Zara becoming Astley's Pixie Queen, and the gang's efforts to bring Nick back from Valhalla.
4	Endure	May 8, 2012
In the finale, Zara and the others reunite with Nick and prepare for the imminent battle between Bedford and an army of pixies. Amidst this conflict, Zara questions her loyalty to both sides.

== Reception ==
The Compulsive Reader called Need an "imaginative and smart paranormal read," labeling Zara "a clever and likable character with backbone." The article went on to praise the supporting cast, as well as Jones' style, claiming that the author "writes with wonderful clarity, making for some super-creepy scenes." Manga Maniac Cafe, which also interviewed Jones, stated that Need "has a little bit of everything, and it manages to blend all of these wonderful elements together in a reading experience that makes you remember why you starting reading in the first place." The review also called the book's narrative "firm and steady and unyielding, driving events from one crescendo of excitement to the next." In a review for teenreads.com, author Chris Stanley-Dillman applauded the novel for its "nail-biting action and heart-pounding romance," and lauded Jones for having "cleverly planned a prolific plot, building suspense and conflict, and revealing many hidden surprises and twists at just the right moment."

Need was listed as one of VOYA's best speculative fiction books of 2008. In 2009, the novel was nominated for the Young Adult Library Services Association's "Best Books" listing.

Captivate debuted at #7 on the New York Times Best Seller list. Manga Maniac Cafe gave the novel a positive review, but claimed that the ending, which was altered in production to accommodate the series, felt unsatisfying. The article gave particular attention to Zara's inner conflict as the series progressed, stating that "part of what makes her such an interesting character is that she has to deal with her guilt and her self-recrimination when she is forced to do things that go against her belief system." The Compulsive Reader labeled Captivate "witty, suspenseful, and absorbing," also applauding its love triangle for a tendency to provide "plenty of tension that propels Captivate’s plot." The article declared the novel a less-complete story than Need, but remarked that the "surprising turn of events and the cliffhanger ending will have everyone eager for a sequel." While discussing Zara, the review stated that she remained "a strong, admirable heroine," citing her desire to help others. By contrast, The Hiding Spot criticized the character's headstrong nature, expressing a desire for Zara to "think her actions through a bit more." The review praised Jones' dialogue and humor, stating that, "There is something so real and comforting about the characters' interaction, whether they are concerned about another or joking around." Children's author Kelly Fineman proclaimed, "Each character shines (and a few leave behind shiny things) in Captivate," commending Jones' use of Norse mythology as well.
