= Lorraine Heath =

American novelist

- Education: University of Texas at Austin (BA)
- Occupation: Novelist
- Writing career
- Pen name: Lorraine Heath; Rachel Hawthorne; J.A. London; Jade Parker
- Period: 1994–present
- Genres: contemporary romance, historical romance, paranormal romance, young adult
- Notable work: Always to Remember
- Notable awards: RITA award – Best Short Historical Romance; 1997 Always to Remember
- Website: lorraineheath.com

Lorraine Heath is an American author of contemporary romance, historical romance, paranormal romance and young adult novels under multiple pen names, including Rachel Hawthorne, J.A. London, and Jade Parker. She is known for her "beautiful, deeply emotional romances" and in 1997, she received the Romance Writers of America RITA Award for Best Short Historical Romance for her novel Always to Remember. As of June 2015, fifteen of her titles made the USA Today bestseller list.

== Biography ==
Heath was born in Watford, Hertfordshire, England from an American father and a British mother. Her parents met while her a father was stationed at Bovingdon while serving in the air force. Shortly after Heath's birth, her family moved to Texas where she was raised in Angleton, Texas.

She earned a BA in psychology from the University of Texas and lived in Austin, Texas, for sixteen years before moving to Plano, Texas in 1987. In 1998, Laura Bush, then First Lady of Texas, invited Heath to serve on a romance panel at the Texas Book Festival.

She wrote training manuals and computer code for the IRS before she turned to fiction writing when she picked up LaVyrle Spencer's Morning Glory, which not only hooked her on Spencer's work, but convinced her that she wanted to write romance. She said up until then she "...had a preconception of what romance was." In 1993, she sold her first novel, Sweet Lullaby. Since then, she's authored over sixty novels, with historical and contemporary romance for adults and historical romance for teen readers. Under the names Rachel Hawthorne and Jade Parker, she writes popular contemporary, historical, and paranormal romance for teens readers. She also writes young adult with her son Alex under the name J. A. London.

In an interview with USA Today, she revealed how she keeps her writing personas separate, "...it helps that I write my historicals in third person and my YA in first so it's a mental shift when I'm writing a particular genre. Writing with my son is a bit more challenging because we wanted J.A. to have a unique voice that was edgier to go with our dystopian world and he's often marking words or phrases that he thinks sounds too Rachel-ish. It's rather like going on a mini-vacation when I slip between the genres. I think it helps to keep my writing fresh because I'm able to go in diverse directions and explore various worlds."

She named the following authors as influential in her young adult writing: Richelle Mead, Sophie Jordan, Marissa Meyer, but mostly Catherine Clark. "When I first became interested in writing Young Adult, I read her books to get a flavoring for the YA genre. Then I was reading her simply because I enjoyed her stories so much."

She's known for her "deeply emotional romances" and "deft characterizations, attention to historical detail and mastery of small moments."

Her writing habits include writing late at night and listening to a CD of a thunderstorm. "It narrows my focus so it's just me, the story, and the thunder." When her novel A Matter of Temptation reached The New York Times Best Seller list, she recalls "I had been out walking the dog and I came in and there was a message on the machine. It said, 'My dear, you've hit the New York Times.' Actually, my husband thought somebody had died because I was screaming and crying... It's something that all authors aspire to do so it's ... it's nice when it happens."

She relates the inspiration for her RITA-winning novel Always to Remember in an interview. "While watching a PBS special on the Civil War, a comment was made that often men from the same town served in the same unit so if a unit was wiped out, the town had no men to return to it. It mentioned how hard this was on the townspeople... I began to wonder, what if only one man returned and everyone thought he was a coward since he survived, but he really wasn't? And what if the town wanted a memorial, and he was the only one with the skills to make it? And the story began to develop from there."

In 2015, publisher Avon Books and independent bookstore Powell's Books started a new romance-author curated list of four books called "Mutual Attractions". The third collaboration was released on June 1, 2015 by Heath, and her short list consisted of Jennifer Bernard's All of Me, Kathleen Baldwin's A School for Unusual Girls, Kristen Callihan's Evernight, and Sarah MacLean's No Good Duke Goes Unpunished.

Heath currently resides in Pleasnr-Bsue with her husband and two sons.

== Bibliography ==
=== As Lorraine Heath ===
==== Texas Series (Leigh Brothers series) ====
Historical Romance

1 Texas Destiny. June 1997.
2 Texas Glory. April 1998.
3 Texas Splendor. January 1999.
3.5Texas Legacy. January 2019.

==== Rogues in Texas ====
Historical Romance

1. A Rogue in Texas. April 1999.
2. Never Love a Cowboy. April 2000.
3. Never Marry a Cowboy. February 2001.

==== Daughters of Fortune ====
Historical Romance

1. The Outlaw and the Lady. October 2001.
2. To Marry an Heiress. September 2002.
3. Love With a Scandalous Lord. June 2003.
4. An Invitation to Seduction. May 2004.

==== The Lost Lords ====
Historical Romance

1. As an Earl Desires. April 2005.
2. A Matter of Temptation. October 2005.
3. Promise Me Forever. April 2006.

==== Rogues and Roses ====
Historical Romance

1. A Duke of Her Own. November 2006.
2. Just Wicked Enough. September 2007.

==== Scoundrels of St. James ====
Historical Romance

Character guide: https://www.lorraineheath.com/st-james-character-guide

1 In Bed With the Devil. June 2008.
2 Between the Devil and Desire. January 2009.
3 Surrender to the Devil. July 2009.
4 Midnight Pleasures With a Scoundrel. November 2009.
4.5 The Last Wicked Scoundrel. January 2014.

==== London's Greatest Lovers ====
Historical Romance

1. Passions of a Wicked Earl. November 2010.
2. Pleasures of a Notorious Gentleman. December 2010.
3. Waking Up With the Duke. July 2011.

==== Lost Lords of Pembrook ====
Historical Romance

1. She Tempts the Duke. February 2012.
2. Lord of Temptation. September 2012.
2.5 Deck the Halls with Love. February 2013.
3. Lord of Wicked Intentions. May 2013.

==== Scandalous Gentlemen of St. James ====
Historical Romance

Character guide: https://www.lorraineheath.com/st-james-character-guide

1 When the Duke Was Wicked. February 2014.
2 Once More, My Darling Rogue. September 2014.
3 The Duke and the Lady in Red. May 2015.
4 An Affair with a Notorious Heiress. May 2017
4.5 Gentlemen Prefer Heiresses. August 2017

==== Hellions of Havisham ====
Historical Romance

1 Falling Into Bed with a Duke. October 2015
2 The Earl Takes All. April 2016
3 The Viscount and the vixen. November 2016
3.5 When the marquess falls. March 2017

==== Sins for All Seasons ====
Historical Romance

1. Beyond Scandal and Desire. January 2018.
2. When a Duke Loves a Woman. August 2018.
3. The Scoundrel in Her Bed. February 2019.
4. The Duchess in His Bed. August 2019.
5. The Earl Takes a Fancy. March 2020.
6. Beauty Tempts the Beast. September 2020.

==== Once upon a Dukedom ====
Historical Romance

1. Scoundrel of my heart. April 2021.
2. The Duchess Hunt. September 2021
3. The Return of the Duke. August 2022

==== The Chessmen ====
1. The Counterfeit Scoundrel February 2023.
2. The Notorious Lord Knightly June 2023.
3. In Want of a Viscount February 2024

==== Stand-alone works ====
Historical Romance

- Sweet Lullaby. March 1994.
- Parting Gifts. December 1994.
- The Ladies' Man. June 1995.
- Always to Remember. February 1996.
- Samantha and the Cowboy. May 2002.
- Amelia and the Outlaw. January 2003.
- The Gunslinger. June 2014.

==== Hard Lovin' Series ====
Contemporary Romance

1. Hard Lovin' Man. November 2003.
2. Smooth Talkin' Stranger. April 2004.

==== Anthologies and short stories ====
- Long Stretch of Lonesome. March 1999.
- The Reluctant Hero. March 2006.
- An Invitation to Scandal. August 2010.

=== As Rachel Hawthorne ===
==== Dark Guardian ====
Paranormal Romance

1. Moonlight. March 2009.
2. Full Moon. July 2009.
3. Dark of the Moon. August 2009.
4. Shadow of the Moon. March 2010.

==== Year Abroad ====
Contemporary Romance

1. London: Kit & Robin. September 2000.
2. Paris: Alex & Dana. October 2000.
3. Rome: Antonio & Carrie. November 2000.

==== Stand-alone works ====
Contemporary Romance

- Nick & the Nerd. June 2001.
- The Older Guy. December 2001.
- Caribbean Cruising. April 2004.
- Island Girls (and Boys). June 2005.
- Love on the Lifts. December 2005.
- Thrill Ride. April 2006.
- Trust Me. January 2007.
- The Boyfriend League. July 2007.
- Snowed In. December 2007.
- Labor of Love. June 2008.
- Suite Dreams. December 2008.
- The Crocodile Who Was Afraid of the Water. June 2009.
- Trouble from the Start. May 2015.
- The Boyfriend Project. May 2015.

=== As J.A. London ===
==== A Darkness Before Dawn ====
Young Adult

1. Darkness Before Dawn. June 2012.
2. Blood-Kissed Sky. January 2013.
3. After Daybreak. June 2013.

=== As Jade Parker ===
==== Making A Splash ====
Young adult contemporary

1. Robyn. May 2008.
2. Caitlin. June 2008.
3. Whitney. July 2008.

==== Stand-alone works ====
- To Catch a Pirate. May 2007.

=== Non-fiction ===
- "Gentle Heroes" essay in North American Romance Writers (1999, ISBN 0810836041)

== Awards and reception ==
=== As Lorraine Heath ===
Awards for Lorraine Heath
Year	Nominated work	Category	Award	Result	Notes	Ref.
1996		Americana Historical Romance	Romantic Times Career Achievement Award	Won		
1997	Always to Remember	Short Historical Romance	Romance Writers of America RITA Award	Won		
2006	Promise Me Forever	British Isle-Set Historical Romance	Romantic Times Reviewers' Choice Award	Won		
2007	Just Wicked Enough	British Isle-Set Historical Romance	Romantic Times Reviewers' Choice Award	Won		
2011	Waking Up With the Duke	Innovative Historical Romance	Romantic Times Reviewers' Choice Award	Won		
2014	Once More, My Darling Rogue	Historical Romance of the Year	Romantic Times Reviewers' Choice Award	Won		
2021	The Duchess Hunt		New York Public Library Best Books for 2021	Listed		

Heath has also received multiple starred reviews from Publishers Weekly and Booklist, and multiple Top Picks from Romantic Times Book Review. She's also a five-time RITA Award finalist.

Multiple titles hit the USA Today list, including Lord of Wicked Intentions, As an Earl Desires, When the Duke Was Wicked, The Duke and the Lady in Red, An Invitation to Seduction, Promise Me Forever, Love With a Scandalous Lord, In Bed With the Devil, To Marry an Heiress, Passions of a Wicked Earl, Never Marry a Cowboy, Surrender to the Devil, Waking Up With the Duke, She Tempts the Duke, and Lord of Temptation

==== Always to Remember ====
RITA Award-winning novel Always to Remember was called by Publishers Weekly "With its unconventional, heart-wrenching hero, this slow-building story plays on every emotion-guilt, anger, honor and, ultimately, love." Romantic Times said "The beautiful prose, the author's depth of understanding for her characters and her absolutely consistent focus on theme raise this love story to the status of poetry. If you want to understand how love heals, how names carved in stone like those on the Vietnam War Memorial can uplift the wounded hearts of both survivors and war protesters, read this unforgettable book."

==== Scandalous Gentlemen of St. James ====
Romance author Sarah MacLean called When the Duke Was Wicked "a perfect read, full of tears and sighs and a heroine who is shocked by her own strength." Kirkus Reviews said it was "A sparkling, emotionally powerful historical romance that satisfyingly deals with physical and spiritual damage." Publishers Weekly said "Heath follows formula with a minimum of period detail or plausibility, particularly with regard to medical matters, and a maximum of swooping dialogue about Grace’s “situation most dire” and the hilariously named villain, Lord Vexley." Whereas Library Journal called it "exquisitely rendered, with two friends parrying and deflecting in order to protect themselves from pain and heartbreak. Featuring couples revived from the author’s 'Scoundrels of St. James' series, this fully fleshed romance will stay with readers long after the final page."

Kirkus Reviews called The Duke and the Lady in Red "A beautiful, unconventional romance that entwines two fierce, lonely hearts who believed they were unlovable and reminds us of the best and worst of human nature." Publishers Weekly said "Heath excels at writing passionate romantic tension, and this emotional page-turner showcases her stunning ability to delve into the characters’ innermost souls." USA Today said "This book starts with such great chemistry and sexual tension...A really well-done story."

==== Scoundrels of St. James ====
As of June 2015, the only 3-star review Heath earned from Romantic Times Book Reviews was for The Last Wicked Scoundrel, in which they felt the romance was "sometimes overshadowed by the chilling mystery at the heart of the story, and fans of the series may wish for more cameos by Heath’s scoundrels, in a happier setting."

==== Lost Lords of Pembrook ====
On February 19, 2012, she made #33 on The New York Times bestseller list with She Tempts the Duke Publishers Weekly said "the middle meanders ...[and] [t]he conclusion is predictable, but Heath excels at depicting the lovers’ initial courtship and relationship building." Whereas Romantic Times called it "powerful story of retribution and salvation. Heath’s talent for creating memorable characters comes to the forefront within a classic plotline that pits good against evil."

A Matter of Temptation reached the New York Times bestseller list when it came out.

==== English Rogues in Texas Series ====
Publishers Weekly said of Never Love a Cowboy "A sub-plot involving a little girl may seem a bit too convenient, but it is one of Heath's strengths to take a standard plot point and make it new and vital. Though these characters are somewhat larger than life than those earlier in her career, Heath has more than enough talent to handle them."

==== London's Greatest Lovers ====
Publishers Weekly said of Waking Up With the Duke "While the eventual outcome is predictable, the sensitive handling of Jayne and Walfort's challenging relationship and the impressive tangle of love, guilt, and secrets will please those who prefer fiery love scenes balanced by complex emotional drama."

=== As Rachel Hawthorne ===
==== Dark Guardian ====
In a review of Moonlight, Donna Rosenblum of School Library Journal stated that "Hawthorne expertly weaves romance with the supernatural, cloaking them with danger and suspense." She concluded that the story "ends a little too neatly and at times seems a bit rushed. However, the author does a good job giving readers a natural view of the legends and myths behind werewolves and their evolution." The Compulsive Reader labeled Moonlight "an absorbing and quick read," noting that werewolves were often overlooked in YA fiction. The review stated that the novel was "a little predictable at the very beginning," but went on to call it "a very engaging and brisk read that will appeal to reluctant readers and even has a couple of mildly surprising twists as the book works its way up to the climax."
