= Charlie Madigan series =

- Cover of the third novel
- The Better Part of Darkness; The Darkest Edge of Dawn; The Hour of Dust and Ashes; Shadows Before the Sun
- Author: Kelly Gay
- Country: United States
- Language: English
- Genre: Urban fantasy
- Publisher: Simon & Schuster
- Published: 24 November 2009

The Charlie Madigan series is a collection of urban fantasy novels by author Kelly Gay. The books present a future in which humanity has discovered two vastly different dimensions, making Atlanta a crossroads for various supernatural beings. The protagonist, Charlie Madigan, is a police officer who attempts to balance her paranormal cases with life as a single mother.

== Overview ==
Following mankind's discovery of two paranormal dimensions—the heavenly Elysia and the hellish Charbydon—the Integration Task Force is created to oversee various supernatural beings who take residence on Earth. The series follows ITF officer Charlie Madigan, a driven and witty Atlanta police officer, who works to maintain peace among humans and non-humans. Madigan has a preteen daughter named Emma, and works alongside a powerful Elysian named Hank. Additionally, Madigan herself begins to display superhuman abilities after being mysteriously revived from the dead. As the series progresses, Charlie attempts to fulfill her duties while protecting those closest to her.

The opening novel, The Better Part of Darkness, follows Charlie's efforts to find the source of an off-world narcotic spreading throughout her city. In book two, The Darkest Edge of Dawn, Charlie and Hank attempt to keep Atlanta from becoming a battleground between Elysia and Charbydon.

In 2010, author Kelly Gay announced that the third novel, The Hour of Dust and Ashes, was scheduled for release in 2011. A fourth was planned for 2012.

== Background ==
Wanting to explore the "normal within the paranormal", Gay chose to give her protagonist a complex personal life. "In the UF world, it seemed very natural to me that there would exist heroines that could doll out the whoopings and also have family, a child, a marriage, a tight support group. I wanted to see what would happen if I placed that kind of character, one juggling a kid, an ex-husband, and work into the urban fantasy mold," Gay said in an interview.

Despite the fantastic elements, Gay describes Charlie's life as being "pretty common in a lot of ways. She's not always the strongest, the smartest, or the most beautiful. She makes mistakes, wins as much as she loses, and sometimes her emotions get in the way. But one of my favorite things about Charlie is that her heart is in the right place; she’d give her last breath for those she loves." The author also drew from personal experience when finding her character's voice. "With Charlie, I pull a lot from my own feelings and emotions about being a mom and wanting the best for my kid—making good choices and sometimes making mistakes, too, all the hopes and fears, etc," Gay said.

== Novels ==
Book #	Title	US release
1	The Better Part of Darkness	24 November 2009
Atlanta has become a crossroads for two paranormal dimensions, Elysia and Charbydon, resulting in a variety of supernatural beings living among humans. Police officer Charlie Madigan works to maintain peace amidst life as a single mother.
2	The Darkest Edge of Dawn	31 August 2010
The truce between Elysia and Charbydon begins to crumble, with Atlanta caught in the middle of their conflict. While trying to maintain order, Charlie faces a variety of personal matters, including the one-year anniversary of her divorce, and the ongoing efforts to protect her family.
3	The Hour of Dust and Ashes	30 August 2011
The third instalment.
4	Shadows Before the Sun	31 July 2012
The fourth instalment.

== Reception ==
Booklist called The Better Part of Darkness "extraordinary." Publishers Weekly stated, "Intricate world-building and richly complex characters mix with a fast-paced plot to create a standout start to a new series." Author Vicki Pettersson also commended the story, stating that it "flaunts one of the greatest qualities of good fantasy: utter believability." Pettersson noted that the fantasy elements are "balanced by the simple story of a mother who will risk anything for those she loves." Jenna Black called Charlie Madigan "the epitome of the modern kick-butt heroine". Romantic Times Book Reviews described the protagonist as "a complex heroine who is hardheaded and gutsy." The review also called the novel "an excellent start to an electrifying new series".

The Better Part of Darkness was a double finalist in the 2010 RITA Awards, presented by Romance Writers of America. The novel also received recognition from the Southern Independent Booksellers Alliance, a trade association representing southern-area book stores in the United States. SIBA identified the novel as an "Okra Pick" in 2009, and as a Long List Book Award Finalist the following year.

RT Book Reviews called The Darkest Edge of Dawn "even better" than its predecessor, commending it for building upon the first novel by exploring the repercussions of Charlie's actions. The review concluded that the "tight plotting keeps the pace brisk and the action exciting." The novel was also nominated for a 2010 Australian Romance Readers Award, appearing in the category of "Favourite Sci-Fi, Urban Fantasy or Futuristic Romance".
