= Radiant =

Radiant may refer to:

== Computers, software, and video games ==
- GtkRadiant, a level editor created by id Software for their games
- Radiant AI, a technology developed by Bethesda Softworks for The Elder Scrolls games
- Radiant, the team that opposes Dire on Dota 2

== Music ==
- Radiant (Atlantic Starr album), 1981
- Radiant (Iris album), 2014

== Ships ==
- HMS Radiant (1916), a destroyer of the British Royal Navy launched in 1916 and sold in 1920
- USS Radiant, the name of more than one United States Navy ship
- Radiant (yacht), a 2009 Lürssen built yacht

== Others ==
- Radiant heat, or thermal radiation, electromagnetic radiation emitted from the surface of an object which is due to the object's temperature
- Radiant heating, a technology for heating indoor and outdoor areas
- Radiant Nuclear, an American nuclear energy company
- Radiant (Kitchen manufacturer), an Australian manufacturer of products for kitchens and laundries
- Radiant (meteor shower), the apparent origin point of meteors in a meteor shower
- Radiant (novel), a 2004 science fiction novel by James Alan Gardner
- Radiant (manfra), a French comic book series by Tony Valente
- Radiant (typeface), a sans-serif typeface
- Radiant, a diamond cut
- Radiant, a line of feminine hygiene products by Procter & Gamble
- Radiant Towers, a private housing estate in Tseung Kwan O, Hong Kong

== See also ==
- Radiance (disambiguation)
- Radian (disambiguation)
- Ray (optics)
- Radio, the combining form of radiant
