= A Rogue By Any Other Name =

First edition

A Rogue By Any Other Name is a historical romance written by Sarah MacLean and published by Avon in 2012. It is the first book in her Rules of Scoundrels quartet. The novel won a RITA Award for Best Historical Romance in 2013.

== Background ==
Sarah MacLean released her first historical romance in 2010.

== Plot summary ==
The novel opens in 1821, when 21-year-old Michael Lawler, Marquess of Bourne, wagers his entire inheritance in a card game - and loses it all to his former guardian. The book resumes 10 years later. Bourne has become a co-owner of The Fallen Angel, a gambling club in London. He discovers that his former family estate is now part of the dowry of his childhood best friend, Lady Penelope Marbury. A previous MacLean novel established that Penelope had previously been jilted by a Duke, leaving her reputation soiled. Despite being on the verge of spinsterhood, Penelope has no intention of making a loveless marriage.

Determined to gain control over the land, Bourne compromises her; with her reputation ruined, she will be forced to marry him. Penelope wants to be loved, and she wants her carefree best friend back.

== Reception ==
The novel received the 2013 RITA Award for Best Historical Romance. MacLean excels at writing dialogue. A Publishers Weekly review found that the focus on the hero and heroine's insecurity became "tiresome", but lauded the comic relief provided by the secondary characters.

Reviewers noted MacLean's strong characters. In an article in The Guardian, Calla Wahlquist described the heroine, Lady Penelope, as "interesting and funny", while author Christina Lauren called Penelope her favorite kind of heroine - "sassy [and] smart", Reviewers agreed that for the first half of the book, the hero, Bourne, was completely unlikable. Wahlquist described him as "a jerk in a way I was supposed to find sexy but didn't". Lauren notes that Bourne redeems himself, both professionally and personally. As he "com[es] to terms with his own emotional vulnerability and need for Penelope, unsurprisingly he becomes a much better man". Secondary characters were also strongly written. While many romance novels show strong friendships between the main characters and the secondary characters, these are most commonly written between the heroine and her female friends or sisters. In this novel, MacLean focused on the relationship between the hero and his male friends and business partners. The novel explores not only "the antagonism between the owners, but also the deep loyalty, fierce protectiveness, and the intimate knowledge each of the owners has for one another".
