= Blue Moon (Noël novel) =

Novel

- Cover Art For Blue Moon
- Author: Alyson Noël
- Language: English
- Series: The Immortals (books)
- Genre: Fantasy novel
- Publisher: St. Martin's Press
- Publication date: July 7, 2009
- Publication place: United States
- Media type: Print Paperback
- Pages: 304 (paperback edition)
- ISBN: 0-312-53276-8
- Preceded by: Evermore
- Followed by: Shadowland

Blue Moon is the second book in The Immortals series by author Alyson Noël released in July 2009. Blue Moon had spent 12 weeks on the New York Times Bestsellers list for children's books as of October 11, 2009.

== Summary ==
Just as Ever is learning everything she can about her new abilities as an immortal, initiated into the dark, seductive world by her beloved Damen, something terrible is happening to him. As Ever’s powers are increasing, Damen’s are fading—stricken by a mysterious illness that threatens his memory, his identity, his life.

Desperate to save him, Ever travels to the mystical dimension of Summerland, uncovering not only the secrets of Damen’s past—the brutal, tortured history he hoped to keep hidden—but also an ancient text revealing the workings of time. With the approaching blue moon heralding her only window for travel, Ever is forced to decide between turning back the clock and saving her family from the accident that claimed them—or staying in the present and saving Damen, who grows weaker each day...

== Adaptations ==
On March 28, 2011, Alyson Noël announced that all 10 books in both The Immortals and The Riley Bloom Series have been optioned by Summit Entertainment.
