= Tooley =

Tooley is a surname that may refer to:

- Bert Tooley (1886–1976), American professional baseball player
- Henry Tooley (1774–1848), American physician and mayor of Natchez, Mississippi
- James Tooley (b. 1959), British professor of education policy at Newcastle University
- James Tooley Jr. (1816–1844), American painter
- John Tooley (1924–2020), English musical administrator
- John Tooley (weightlifter) (born 1897), British Olympic weightlifter
- Léon Tooley (b. 1972), British novelist
- Mark Tooley (b. 1965), American conservative magazine editor and think-tank president
- Max Tooley (born 1998), American football player
- Michael Tooley, American philosopher
- Nicholas Tooley (1583–1623), English Renaissance actor
- Richard Tooley (1820–1910), Canadian farmer and provincial assembly legislator from Ontario
- S.D. Tooley (contemporary), American novelist of mystery and urban fantasy

It may also refer to:

- Tooley Street, London street in the Borough of Southwark
- 1861 Tooley Street fire, a fire on Tooley Street

== See also ==
- Toley, fictional character played by Ron Hayes in the television western Two Faces West 1961 episode "Music Box"
- Albert Toley (1855-1924), founder and first president of Brent Valley Golf Club in Hanwell, London, UK
- George Toley (1916-2008), American collegiate coach
