= Dead Beautiful =

2010 novel by Yvonne Woon

- Author: Yvonne Woon
- Cover artist: Elizabeth H. Clark (design); Jonathan Barkat (photograph)
- Country: United States
- Language: English
- Genre: Urban fantasy, Young adult novel
- Publisher: Hyperion Books
- Published: September 21, 2010
- Media type: Print (Hardcover, Paperback); E-book (Kindle); Audio Book (CD)
- Followed by: Life Eternal

Dead Beautiful is a young adult urban fantasy novel by American author Yvonne Woon. The story follows Renée Winters, an orphan who is sent to the mysterious Gottfried academy. While enrolled, Renée discovers a series of enigmas, most surrounding her school, her boyfriend, and eventually herself. The novel was released to critical acclaim in 2010, with a sequel, Life Eternal, following in 2012.

== Overview ==
Dead Beautiful introduces Renée Winters, a thoughtful and alluring girl from California with a largely soft-spoken demeanor. On her sixteenth birthday, she finds the deceased bodies of her parents in a forest. Both are discovered with gauze in their mouths after apparently suffering heart attacks. Soon afterward, Renée's grandfather, who separated from the family after a dispute, sends her to a seemingly gothic boarding school called Gottfried Academy in Maine. Upon arrival, she befriends a girl named Eleanor, and becomes romantically linked to a mysterious boy named Dante. It soon becomes apparent that Renée is somehow able to detect dead bodies, while other paranormal enigmas surround her and Dante as well. After learning of a death similar to those of her parents, and finding that other students have gone missing, Renée begins to investigate a supernatural mystery.

== Background ==
Growing up in a stone colonial surrounded by woods, author Yvonne Woon "developed a penchant for the macabre." Several aspects of Gottfried Academy were inspired by Woon's time as a student at Worcester Academy. She later became fascinated with Latin, and incorporated it into her novel. Woon has stated that the language "just seemed to fit naturally into the lore of the story." The author chose Maine as her primary setting, noting that the quiet, "undiscovered" allure lent itself well to the mysterious nature of her tale.

== Reception ==
In a starred review, Kirkus likened Dead Beautiful to a more serious version of Alice in Wonderland, and stated that the novel "takes a new and unconventional look at the undead, focusing on story and interesting characters and leaving gore and mayhem hidden in the background." The review summed up the book as well written and intriguing, adding that it "ends with much to explore in what one hopes will be swiftly forthcoming sequels." School Library Journal called the story "a real page-turner." A review from Booklist compared the novel to Murder, She Wrote, and stated that it "offers an attention-grabbing take on zombies." The review also noted that the "world building and setting contribute as much to the story as character and plot."

== Sequels ==
The sequel to Dead Beautiful, titled Life Eternal, was released on January 24, 2012. Woon's third and final book in the series, Love Reborn, was released in January 2014.
