= Radiance (book) =

2010 novel by Alyson Noël

- First edition (US)
- Author: Alyson Noël
- Language: English
- Series: Riley Bloom Series
- Genre: Children's fiction, fantasy
- Publisher: Square Fish (US); Turtleback Books (UK)
- Publication date: 31 August 2010
- Publication place: United States
- Media type: Paperback
- Pages: 192 Pages
- ISBN: 978-0-330-52691-3
- Followed by: Shimmer

Radiance is the first book of the Riley Bloom Series written by Alyson Noël, which is a spin-off of The Immortals (Noël series).

== Plot ==
Riley Bloom crossed the bridge into the afterlife following a car crash - with her parents and her beloved dog, Buttercup. The afterlife is situated in - Here & Now . And it turns out that the afterlife is not just an eternity of leisure. Riley meets The Council where she is assigned a job as a Soul Catcher, with weird but maybe cute boy as her guide whose name is Bodhi. Her first assignment will take her back to earth, to everything she's left behind - where she must find the Radiant Boy, a ten-year-old, long - lost spirit in the haunting castles of England for centuries, who doesn't want to move on.

== Reviews ==
"Riley, who appeared in ghost form to her older sister, Ever, in Noël’s bestselling Evermore, takes center stage in this middle-grade spinoff, first in a planned series. . . . her wit, attitude, and maturation should have readers gladly following her into the second installment."—Publishers Weekly

"Narrating in a contemporary voice with an honest and comfortable cadence, Riley is imperfect, but always likable as she sweeps readers to her faraway land where she makes herself and readers assess their behaviors and, quite possibly, make adjustments. In the midst of this wildly fanciful setting, Noël is able to capture with nail-on-the-head accuracy common worries and concerns of today’s tweens."—School Library Journal

"A tale for lovers of the genre . . . For those preteens who like a mild supernatural adventure with romantic overtones, you go, ghost."—Kirkus Reviews

Radiance is rated 3.57 out of 5 at Goodreads.com
