= Unearthly =

Novel series by Cynthia Hand

- Cover of the first novel
- Unearthly; Hallowed; Boundless
- Author: Cynthia Hand
- Country: United States
- Language: English
- Genre: Urban fantasy, Young adult novel
- Publisher: HarperCollins
- Published: January 4, 2011
- Media type: Print (hardcover)

Unearthly is a series of young adult urban fantasy novels by American author Cynthia Hand, beginning with the entry of the same name. The story follows a teenager named Clara, who learns that she is part angel and has a purpose to fulfill on Earth. While seeking answers about her role, Clara encounters friends, enemies, and romantic interests amidst her journey.

== Overview ==
Unearthly tells the story of Clara Gardner, a teenager who has learned that she, her brother Jeffrey and her mother are part angel—known as angel-bloods. Clara's hybrid status grants her various superhuman abilities, and also gives her an undiscovered purpose to fulfill. After dreaming of a young man and a forest fire, Clara eventually meets and watches over Christian Prescott, the boy in her visions. She also befriends a brooding angel-blood named Angela Zerbino, a girl named Wendy Avery, and Wendy's brother Tucker Avery. As the story progresses, Clara becomes romantically drawn to both Christian and Tucker, learns of a conflict with fallen angels, and tries to discover her purpose on Earth. Throughout the series, Clara deals with the loss of her mother and discovers that she is one of the only seven triplares in the world, which means she is 3/4 angel and has powers that exceed that of angel-bloods who are 1/4 angel.

== Background ==
=== Conception and characters ===
Though the series features a paranormal lead, Cynthia Hand has stated that Unearthly is primarily "a human story" centered on personal matters. "My story is about a girl who wants to understand her purpose on this earth. Her situation is a metaphor, I think, for a basic question all human beings ask themselves at some point: Why am I here? Clara isn’t trying to find her place in some epic struggle between good and evil. She is trying to find herself," Hand said. Hand was partly inspired by events in her own life prior to writing the tale: "I’d just had a baby, my husband had a new job, and we’d moved to a town where I didn’t know anybody, and I really had to stop and ask myself, Who am I? What am I doing here?" These experiences gradually lent themselves to the development of Clara's character.

In creating her male leads, Hand gave Tucker and Christian numerous similarities, believing that doing so would make for a challenging love triangle. "I think one reason why I created Christian Prescott and Tucker Avery to both essentially be good, decent people, was because I wanted Clara to have to make a real choice. It would have been easier, I think, if when she came to her big decision, one guy was kind of a jerk and one wasn't," she said. Despite the commonalities, Hand feels that the characters are distinguished by their flaws, with Christian being overly privileged, and Tucker, at times, being stubborn and prideful. The author took a similar approach in creating her protagonist. "Clara is flawed, but I think that gives her room to grow as a person throughout the series."

In a 2010 interview, Hand expressed fondness for Clara's friend Wendy, noting that her material was reduced for the first novel, but could be expanded afterward. She has described the character as "that kind of steadfast friend who's always there for you, who tells you the truth when you need to hear it, who stands by your side when you need backup, and who doesn't take herself too seriously. Clara needs a friend like that."

Hand has noted Angela as one of her favorite characters to write, citing her complex nature and the occasional rivalry between Angela and Clara. "I think Angela means well, for the most part, but she's so focused on discovering all she can about herself and the angel-bloods that she brings trouble down on herself at times, which often enough brings trouble down on Clara, too," she said.

Throughout the first novel, Clara's mother Maggie is largely presented as a loving but secretive figure. Following the book's release, Hand indicated that Maggie's knowledge and purpose would serve to move the story forward as the series progressed.

=== Story development ===
In creating the world of Unearthly, Hand researched a variety of angel mythologies and combined them with ideas of her own. "I didn’t want to base my novel’s world on any one text, but I did find some ideas that I latched on to from a host of different sources. Then I did what all writers do: I made stuff up. I released myself from having to be true to one particular mythology and made up my own, which was really fun."

== Novels ==
Book #	Title	US release
1	Unearthly	January 4, 2011
Upon learning that she is part angel, a teenager named Clara begins to seek out her purpose on Earth. While honing superhuman abilities, Clara meets new friends and romantic interests, and learns of a conflict with fallen angels.
2	Hallowed	January 17, 2012
Clara is still reeling from the choice she was forced to make amidst the forest fire. Torn between her love for Tucker and a destiny that will separate them, Clara also discovers that someone she loves will die in a matter of months. With her future uncertain, the only thing Clara knows is that the fire was just the beginning.
3	Boundless	January 22, 2013
Clara prepares for the battle against the evil Black Wings, and attempts to protect those closest to her by keeping her distance from them.

== Reception ==
A review from School Library Journal commended the first novel for its quick pacing, and also noted that "Hand does an excellent job of creating and sustaining the mood of teenage angst mixed with first love." Kirkus Reviews stated that the book "stands out with even pacing, fully developed characters, vivid descriptions of the West's rugged beauty and Clara's independent spirit." Publishers Weekly remarked that Hand tells "an engaging and romantic tale with solid backstory." The review also noted that the novel's characters "deal realistically with the uncertainty of being on the cusp of maturity without wrapping themselves in angst." Author Kimberly Derting called Unearthly a "gripping tale of destiny, family, and first love". Richelle Mead described the story as, "Utterly captivating. One of the most addictive books I’ve read in a while."

== Adaptation ==
Prior to the novel's release, Hand reported that a possible film or television adaptation of Unearthly was in the early planning stages.
