= Kelly Gay =

American author

- Occupation: Author
- Writing career
- Genre: Urban fantasy
- Notable work: Charlie Madigan series

Kelly Gay is an American author, known for her work in the science fiction/fantasy genre, particularly urban fantasy. Gay has written books in both the adult and young adult genres, penning the latter under the name of Kelly Keaton. She is particularly known for the Charlie Madigan series, a story about a police officer who attempts to balance paranormal cases, across three different worlds, with life as a single mother. Her works have received critical acclaim and award recognition, and have been translated into several different languages. Gay has also been a recipient of the North Carolina Arts Council's Fellowship Grant in Literature.

== Personal life ==
"In urban fantasy I was really inspired by Emma Bull and Laurell K. Hamilton and then by Kim Harrison."

— Kelly Gay

As a child, Kelly Gay was introduced to fantasy by her mother and grandmother, both avid storytellers. She grew up reading and researching mythologies and ancient histories from around the world, and eventually writing paranormal stories and screenplays while working an assortment of jobs. In 2006, Gay received a North Carolina Arts Council fellowship grant in literature for one of her many screenplays, which she credits with helping to boost her confidence as a storyteller.

In 2008, two of her unpublished manuscripts became finalists in the Golden Heart Awards, presented by Romance Writers of America. Her debut novel was acquired by Simon & Schuster the same year. She resides in North Carolina with her husband and two children.

== Career ==
=== Charlie Madigan series ===
Gay's debut novel, The Better Part of Darkness, was released in November 2009. It is the first book in the Charlie Madigan series. Set in Atlanta, the story presents a future in which humanity has discovered two paranormal dimensions. As a result, Earth becomes a new home for various benevolent or malicious supernatural beings. The series follows the personal and professional challenges of Charlie Madigan, a single mother and a policewoman.

A review from Booklist called the first novel "extraordinary." Publishers Weekly stated, "Intricate world-building and richly complex characters mix with a fast-paced plot to create a standout start to a new series." The Better Part of Darkness was a double finalist in the 2010 RITA Awards, presented by Romance Writers of America. The novel also received recognition from the Southern Independent Booksellers Alliance, a trade association representing southern-area book stores in the United States. SIBA identified the novel as an "Okra Pick" in 2009, and also as a Long List Book Award Finalist the following year.

The second Charlie Madigan novel, The Darkest Edge of Dawn, was released in August 2010. Romantic Times Book Reviews called it better than its predecessor, and remarked that the "tight plotting keeps the pace brisk and the action exciting." The book was also nominated for a 2010 Australian Romance Readers Award, appearing in the category of "Favourite Sci-Fi, Urban Fantasy or Futuristic Romance".

=== Young-adult fiction ===
In 2010, Gay revealed plans to write young adult fiction under the name Kelly Keaton. Her first YA novel, Darkness Becomes Her, was released in February 2011. The book presents a post-disaster New Orleans, renamed New 2, which is largely abandoned and believed to be inhabited by paranormal beings. An isolated teenager named Ari returns to New 2 seeking answers about her past, finding new mysteries and allies along the way. A review from School Library Journal stated that the story "paints richly detailed scenes of the New Orleans landscape and crafts fully realized, sympathetic characters. Ari’s journey from loner to wary member of a band of misfits and her fall for one of them spins a compelling thread through her quest." Author Christopher Pike called the book, "Unforgettable, complex, and unique."

== Bibliography ==
=== Charlie Madigan series ===
1. The Better Part of Darkness (November 2009, ISBN 978-1-4391-0965-6)
2. The Darkest Edge of Dawn (August 2010, ISBN 978-1-4391-1004-1)
3. The Hour of Dust and Ashes (August 2011, ISBN 978-1-4516-2547-9)
4. Shadows Before the Sun (July 2012, ISBN 978-1-4516-2548-6)
5. The Cold Light of Day (expected 2016)

=== Gods and Monsters series (as Kelly Keaton) ===
1. Darkness Becomes Her (February 2011, ISBN 978-1-4424-0924-8)
2. A Beautiful Evil (February 2012, ISBN 978-1-4424-0927-9)
3. The Wicked Within (September 2013, ISBN 9781442493155)
4. Heart of Stone (February 2015, ISBN 9780988522572)

=== Stand alone novels (as Kelly Keaton) ===
1. Embers in a Dark Frost (eBook, November 2012, ISBN 9780988522503)

=== Stand alone novels (as Kelly Gay) ===
1. Halo: Smoke and Shadow (2017)
2. Halo: Renegades (2019)
3. Halo: Point of Light (2021)
4. Halo: The Rubicon Protocol (2022)
5. Halo: Epitaph (2024)
6. Halo: Edge of Dawn (2025)

=== Short stories ===
1. "Hell's Menagerie" published in Carniepunk (July 2013, ISBN 9781476714158)
2. "Into the Fire", published in Halo: Fractures (September 2016)
