= Toole =

Toole is a surname that may refer to:

- F.X. Toole (1930–2002), American boxing trainer and author
- John Kennedy Toole (1937–1969), American novelist
- Annette O'Toole (born Toole; 1952), American actress, dancer, and singer-songwriter
- John Lawrence Toole (1830–1906), English comic actor and theatrical producer
- Joseph Toole (1851–1929), American politician from Montana; governor of Montana 1889–93
- K. Ross Toole (1920–1981), American historian and author
- Melinda Toole (contemporary), American beauty queen; Miss Alabama 2006
- Ottis Toole (1947–1996), American serial killer
- Paul Toole (1970- ), Deputy Premier of New South Wales
- Steve Toole (1859–1919), American professional baseball player
- Warren Toole (1893–1972), American lawyer and public official
- Zula Brown Toole (1868–1947), American newspaper publisher

== See also ==
- Tool (disambiguation)
- Toole County, Montana, a county in the United States
- Tooley, a surname
- Tulle, a commune in central France
