= Diana Peterfreund =

American author (born 1979)

- Peterfreund at Dragon Con in 2026
- Born: January 20, 1979 (age 47); Tampa, Florida, U.S.
- Education: Yale University
- Occupation: Author
- Writing career
- Genres: Young adult, chick lit
- Website: www.dianapeterfreund.com

Diana Peterfreund (born January 20, 1979) is an American author.

== Biography ==
Peterfreund grew up near Tampa, Florida and graduated from Yale University in 2001 with a double major in literature and geology. She drew upon her time as a daughter of Eli to color her Secret Society Girl novels. Before becoming a novelist, she was a costume designer, book cover model and food critic. An avid traveler, Peterfreund lives with her husband and daughters near Washington, D.C.

== Works ==
=== Secret Society Girl ===
Peterfreund's first book, Secret Society Girl: An Ivy League Novel, details the second semester of Amy "Bugaboo" Haskell's junior year at Eli University, a thinly veiled Yale University clone, after she is tapped for Rose & Grave, a secret society that opens its ranks to women for the first time. Peterfreund used her time at Yale as the basis for Amy's Eli experience. The New York Observer described the book as "witty and endearing", and Booklist described the book as "frivolous but fun to read". Three other books were released in the series, chronicling Amy's senior year.

In Under the Rose, Amy uncovers scandals that could undermine the very foundation of Rose & Grave: a fellow "Diggirl" seems to be feeding confidential information to a nonmember to bring the society down from within and several current and former male Diggers have formed an "old boys' club" offshoot of Rose & Grave.

Eager to escape the wrath of a rival society on campus, Amy and the Knights are whisked off to Rose & Grave's private island off the coast of Florida in Rites of Spring (Break). In addition to dealing with a disgraced patriarch in hiding on the island after the fallout from society-related scandals, Amy and her friends fall victim to increasingly serious accidents—while Amy gets close to the patriarch who betrayed her.

Back on campus for Tap & Gown, Amy readies for graduation between juggling unfulfilled gen-ed credits and helping to select a new tap class, amidst dwindling post-graduation prospects. Troubling phone calls only add to Amy's stress when her prospective tap has gaps in her resume—and a mysterious past that includes Amy's new boyfriend.

=== Morning Glory ===
Morning Glory is a novelization of the 2010 motion picture Morning Glory, written by Aline Brosh McKenna and starring Harrison Ford, Rachel McAdams and Diane Keaton. Going into the project, Peterfreund wrote, "My goal was always to remain as true to the script as possible, and to preserve the content, tone, and intent of the screenwriter." As McKenna had previously adapted Lauren Weisberger's The Devil Wears Prada, Peterfreund "tried to think of how she'd translated the book into her medium, but backwards."

=== Killer Unicorns ===
Peterfreund has written two full-length novels and three short stories about or dealing with killer unicorns. These are Rampant, Ascendant, Errant in Kiss Me Deadly: 13 Tales of Paranormal Lore, The Care and Feeding of Your Baby Killer Unicorn in Zombies vs. Unicorns, and On a Field, Sable in Eternal Spring. Errant, The Care and Feeding of Your Baby Killer Unicorn, and On a Field, Sable are all stand-alone stories in the Killer Unicorn universe, while Rampant and Ascendant are meant to be read in that order.

== Publications ==
Secret Society Girl

| Title | Year |
|---|---|
| Secret Society Girl | 2006 |
| Under the Rose | 2007 |
| Rites of Spring (Break) | 2008 |
| Tap & Gown | 2009 |

Killer Unicorns

| Title | Year | Notes |
|---|---|---|
| Rampant | 2009 | |
| Ascendant | 2010 | |
| Errant | 2010 | a short story in Kiss Me Deadly: 13 Tales of Paranormal Lore |
| The Care and Feeding of Your Baby Killer Unicorn | 2010 | a short story in Zombies vs. Unicorns |
| On a Field, Sable | 2012 | a short story in Eternal Spring: A Young Adult Short Story Collection |

Stars

| Title | Year |
|---|---|
| For Darkness Shows the Stars | 2012 |
| Across a Star-Swept Sea | 2013 |
| Among the Nameless Stars | 2013 |
| The First Star to Fall | 2013 |

=== Omega City ===
| Title | Year |
|---|---|
| Omega City | 2015 |
| Omega City: The Forbidden Fortress | 2017 |
| Omega City: Infinity Base | 2018 |

Other publications

| Title | Year |
|---|---|
| Morning Glory | 2010 |

Short stories

| Title | Year | ISBN | Notes |
|---|---|---|---|
| Stray Magic | 2012 | ISBN 978-1-4714-0013-1 | published in Under My Hat - Tales from the Cauldron |

Essays

| Title | Year |
|---|---|
| The World of the Golden Compass: The Otherworldly Ride Continues | 2007 |
| Through the Wardrobe: Your Favorite Authors on C. S. Lewis's Chronicles of Narnia | 2008 |
| Everything I Needed to Know About Being a Girl I Learned From Judy Blume | 2009 |
| Mind-Rain: Your Favorite Authors on Scott Westerfeld's Uglies Series | 2009 |
