= Sarah MacLean =

American writer

- Sarah MacLean at the Romance Writers of America Conference, July 2015, New York, NY
- Born: December 17, 1978 (age 47); Lincoln, Rhode Island, U.S.
- Education: Smith College (BA); Harvard University (MA)
- Occupation: Writer
- Writing career
- Period: 2009–present
- Genres: Young Adult, Historical, Romance
- Notable work: Nine Rules to Break When Romancing a Rake
- Notable awards: RITA award – Best Historical Romance; 2014 No Good Duke Goes Unpunished; RITA award – Best Historical Romance; 2013 A Rogue by Any Other Name
- Website: sarahmaclean.net

Sarah MacLean (born on December 23, 1978) is a New York Times bestselling American author of young adult novels and romance novels. Her first adult romance novel, Nine Rules to Break When Romancing a Rake debuted on the New York Times Bestseller List, where it stayed for four weeks. Since then, all of her adult romance novels have been on the New York Times and USA Today bestseller lists. From 2014 to 2018, MacLean wrote a monthly romance novel review column for The Washington Post. She is a two-time winner of the Romance Writers of America RITA Award for Best Historical Romance for A Rogue by Any Other Name in 2013 and No Good Duke Goes Unpunished in 2014. She is also the co-host of the weekly Fated Mates podcast, where she and her co-host, Jen Prokop, analyze and deconstruct the romance genre.

== Biography ==
MacLean was born in Lincoln, Rhode Island to an Italian father and a British mother. MacLean's website reports that her mother worked for MI6. MacLean started reading romance because her older sister read the books, and she has wanted to be a romance novelist since she was a teenager. In 2000, MacLean received a BA in American Studies from Smith College in Northampton, Massachusetts. While at Smith, MacLean and her friends read hundreds of romance novels.

MacLean moved to New York City in 2000, and worked as a literary publicist until she attended graduate school at Harvard University, receiving a master's degree in education. Upon returning to New York City, she wrote her first book, a young adult novel, The Season, after a friend suggested she try her hand at writing for teens. The book, set in Regency England, received numerous awards, and was named to the 2010 Lone Star Reading List of the Texas Library Association.

After The Season, MacLean wrote her first adult romance novel, Nine Rules to Break When Romancing a Rake, a Regency historical. The book debuted on the USA Today Bestseller List and The New York Times Best Seller list, where it stayed for four weeks, and was the first recipient of the Romantic Times Magazine Seal of Excellence.

MacLean is a self-proclaimed feminist and speaks widely on the intersection of feminism and the romance genre. She is a vocal defender of the literary merit of the romance novel and the skill it takes to write it well. In February 2014, MacLean began writing a monthly romance review column for The Washington Post. In July 2019, she hosted the Romance Writers of America RITA Awards. In 2021, MacLean appeared on the popular podcast 99% Invisible where she discussed the importance of the romance genre and its history (which co-aired on Fated Mates).

MacLean is a staunch advocate for political and literary causes. In 2024, she became a founding board member of Authors Against Book Bans, a national organization of authors in the fight against book bans and challenges. Through her podcast, MacLean runs weekly phonebanks for progressive candidates during election years, and raises money for democrats in downballot races.

She and her husband live in Brooklyn, New York. She is active on social media, primarily posting on Threads and Instagram.

== Bibliography ==
=== Romance novels ===
==== Love By Numbers Series ====
1. Nine Rules to Break When Romancing a Rake. Avon. March 2010 [2010]. ISBN 9780061852053.
2. Ten Ways to be Adored When Landing a Lord. Avon. October 26, 2010 [2010]. ISBN 9780061852060.
3. Eleven Scandals to Start to Win a Duke's Heart. Avon. April 26, 2011 [2011]. ISBN 9780061852077.

==== The Rules of Scoundrels ====
1. A Rogue By Any Other Name
2. One Good Earl Deserves A Lover. Avon. January 29, 2013 [2013]. ISBN 9780062068538.
3. No Good Duke Goes Unpunished. Avon. November 26, 2013 [2013]. ISBN 9780062068545.
4. Never Judge a Lady by Her Cover. Avon. November 2014 [2014]. ISBN 9780062068514.

==== Scandal and Scoundrel ====
1. The Rogue Not Taken. Avon. January 2016 [2016]. ISBN 9780062379412.
2. A Scot in the Dark. Avon. September 2016 [2016]. ISBN 9780062379429.
3. The Day of the Duchess. Avon. July 2017 [2017]. ISBN 9780062379467.

==== Bareknuckle Bastards ====
1. Wicked and the Wallflower. Avon. June 2018 [2018]. ISBN 9780062379467.
2. Brazen and the Beast. Avon. July 2019 [2019]. ISBN 9780062912978.
3. Daring and the Duke. Avon. June 2020 [2020]. ISBN 9780063006492.

==== Hell's Belles ====
1. Bombshell. Avon. August 2021 [2021]. ISBN 9780063056152.
2. Heartbreaker. Avon. August 2022 [2022]. ISBN 9780349429632.
3. Knockout. Avon. August 2023 [2023]. ISBN 9780349429656.

=== Romance novellas ===
- "The Bladesmith Queen" appeared in the anthology Sword Stone Table (July 2021).
- "A Duke Worth Falling For" appeared in the anthology Naughty Brits (September 2020).
- "The Duke of Christmas Present" appeared in the anthology How the Dukes Stole Christmas (October 2018).
- "She, Doomed Girl", co-written with Carrie Ryan, appeared in the anthology Dark Duets (March 2013).

=== Standalones ===
- The Season. Orchard Books. March 2009 [2009]. ISBN 9780545048866.
- Generation Wonder. Harry N Abrams. June 2022 [2022]. ISBN 9781419754463.
- These Summer Storms. Ballantine Books. July 2025 [2025]. ISBN 9780593972250.

== Podcast ==
In 2018, MacLean started the Fated Mates podcast with critic Jen Prokop. The weekly podcast releases Wednesdays and features "deep dive discussions" of classic texts and books that showcase the sociological work of the romance genre, as well as "interstitial episodes" which provide long-form analysis of common tropes used in the genre.

In its fourth season, Fated Mates began collecting the oral histories of romance trailblazers: authors, editors and others who built the modern genre.

In 2020, Fated Mates launched Fated States, to provide their listeners an outlet for political action. The podcast hosts phone banks and fundraising drives for democratic candidates during election season, and mobilizes off-season to support progressive causes.

== Awards and reception ==
- 2010 - Texas Library Association Lone Star Reading List for The Season
- 2010 (April) - Romantic Times Magazine Seal of Excellence for Nine Rules to Break When Romancing a Rake
- 2013 - Romance Writers of America, RITA Award for Best Historical Romance for A Rogue By Any Other Name
- 2014 - Romance Writers of America, RITA Award for Best Historical Romance for No Good Duke Goes Unpunished
- 2014 - Library Journal Top Ten Best Romances of 2014 – Never Judge a Lady by Her Cover
- 2022 - New York Public Library Best Books for Adults 2022 – Heartbreaker
- 2023 - New York Public Library Best Books for Adults 2023 – Knockout

MacLean has hit the New York Times Bestseller List and USA Today Bestseller List with all of her romance novels. She has received starred reviews for several titles from Booklist, Kirkus, Publishers Weekly, and Library Journal.
