= No Good Duke Goes Unpunished =

First edition

No Good Duke Goes Unpunished is a historical romance written by Sarah MacLean and published by Avon in 2013. Is it the third of four books in the Rule of Scoundrels quartet. The novel won a RITA Award for Best Historical Romance and a Romantic Times award for Historical Romance of the Year.

== Background ==
Sarah MacLean released her first historical romance in 2010. No Good Duke Unpunished is the third of four books in a series known as the Rule of Scoundrels quartet. The four books were tightly interconnected, with the first two, A Rogue by Any Other Name and One Good Earl Deserves A Lover, hinting at many secrets that were revealed in this novel. The final two sentences of the epilogue to No Good Duke Goes Unpunished provided a key hint to the last novel, Never Judge a Lady by Her Cover.

This novel is slightly unusual for the genre, as the book for the most part avoids the traditional London society settings for historical romances, instead taking place largely in the underworld, a casino. It was published by Avon on November 26, 2013.

== Plot summary ==
The novel opens in London in 1831. The hero, William Harrow, the Marquess of Chapin, is better known as Temple, a partner in a popular casino known as The Fallen Angel. Temple was exiled from his life as a privileged aristocrat twelve years previously, when he was accused of murdering his father's fiancé, Mara. In actuality, Mara had chosen to disappear, as she did not want to marry a man old enough to be her father.

Mara's brother loses a great deal of money in The Fallen Angel. Mara comes out of hiding to offer Temple a deal. She will reveal that she is alive, thus clearing his name, if he will forgive her brother's debts.

== Reception ==
Reviewers overwhelmingly praised the novel. The Kirkus Reviews review noted the "compelling and complex characters", and Lezli Patterson singled out Mara as "one of the most intriguing and strongest heroines ever created". In Library Journal, Barbara Hofffert said the book "can be profoundly unsettling"; Patterson agreed, warning readers that the novel might leave them in tears. According to Kathe Robin in Romantic Times, "this is not just a marvelous deep-sigh romance, but a story in which the intensity and profound significance linger long after the tale is done."

The novel won the 2014 RITA Award for Best Historical Romance, the second year in a row that MacLean was honored in that category. The novel also won Romantic Times's 2013 award for Historical Romance of the Year.
