= Courtney Allison Moulton =

American fantasy author (born 1985)

- Born: August 16, 1986 (age 39)
- Occupation: Fantasy author
- Website: http://courtneyallisonmoulton.com

Courtney Allison Moulton (born August 18, 1986) is an American fantasy author. She wrote the acclaimed and bestselling Angelfire which was published by Katherine Tegen Books, an imprint of HarperCollins.

== Notable works ==
Angelfire novel series

- Angelfire (2011)
- Wings of the Wicked (2012)
- Shadows in the Silence (2013)
- A Dance with Darkness (2013)
- Wardens of Eternity (2020)
