= Jaz Parks series =

Series of novels by Jennifer Rardin

Jaz Parks Series
- Cover of Once Bitten, Twice Shy, the first novel in the series.
- Author: Jennifer Rardin
- Language: English
- Genre: Urban fantasy Spy-fi
- Publisher: Orbit Books
- Publication date: October 8, 2007–Present
- Publication place: United States, United Kingdom

The Jaz Parks series is an urban fantasy collection of spy-fi novels by American author Jennifer Rardin. The series is set in a contemporary world in which mythological beings such as vampires and several less famous creatures are real, and follows the efforts of the Central Intelligence Agency to combat paranormal threats to national security.

The focus of the tale is CIA operative Jasmine "Jaz" Parks, who is regularly partnered with her boss, the enigmatic vampire Vayl. While on missions, Jaz and Vayl are tasked with stopping paranormal or mythological beings who've taken criminal roles in human society, or humans engaged in related activities.

The series is published through Orbit Books and includes eight novels.

== Characters ==
=== Jaz Parks ===
The series' wise-cracking protagonist, Jasmine Elaine Parks is a CIA assassin who is regularly assigned to paranormal cases. Having been born into a military family, she experienced frequent travel while growing up, which has made her something of a loner. Her mother was abusive and her father was away serving his country, and she was the main support of her twin brother Dave and little sister. Her extensive martial arts background includes training in kung fu, aikido, and taekwondo. In addition, she is a noted sharpshooter and possesses an ability to detect the presences of vampires, while also being highly resistant to several of their powers. She gains more powers as the books continue—she has something called a "Spirit Eye" which gives her more gifts as it opens further. She can leave her body as an astral projection, visit the heavenly and hell realms (during which she finds out her old fiance is an Eldhayr, a form of angel) and sense the presences of all magical beings as well as sensing spells and their casters. Also, her powers are enhanced due to blood exchanges—with a werewolf called Trayton she gains the ability to call fire when angry. When Vayl takes her blood, her abilities are heightened exponentially, and gains new abilities.

During the course of the series she is forced to come to terms with a night when her fiancé, her brother's wife, and several of her teammates are killed in a vampire attack, after which she is inexplicably paired with Vayl and moved from vampire hunting to assassination. Though she and Vayl work well together, she is traumatized by that night and has several trust and relationship issues, not helped by Vayl's secrecy. It is slowly revealed that she is Vayl's avhar (a sort of partner chosen by fate, one for each vampire.) He gives her his ring, Cirilai, in order to protect his soul, and through the course of the novels they become closer, eventually falling in love and becoming lovers. However, due to their work there are several obstacles, particularly Vayl's extremely vicious ex-wife Liliana, and his only fledgling Disa. They also face several criminal and supernatural foes, including the CIA's most-wanted—Edward "The Raptor" Samos, a vampire of extreme power.

=== Vayl ===
A vampire who was born in Romania in 1744, Vayl is now a CIA official who regularly serves as Jaz's field partner and direct superior. His record is so diverse and secure that only the president and head of Jaz's department is allowed to see it. His transformation came at the hands of his wife, Liliana, who reappears and is killed during the series' present-day story. She hates him, though desires his ring Cirali because of the power it will grant her—when Jaz receives it, she attempts to kill her. He is a generally guarded, enigmatic figure who harbors trauma relating to the past and his children, whose deaths he unwittingly caused. In a fit of grief, he attempted to summon a creature in order to take revenge on his children's killer, but his wife was turned into a vampire by the creature he summoned. She in turn turned him. After being told by a seer he would see his sons reincarnated, he became obsessed with finding them, though this desire has lessened as he and Jaz have gotten closer. He is also shown to share Jaz's sense of humor at times, though he rarely smiles. Like Parks, Vayl is highly adept at his job and is considered one of the agency's top operatives. At the beginning of his and Jaz working relationship he was distant and formal, but eventually reveals he is her sverhamin and they are bound together. To protect his soul he gives her Cirilai, which was forged by his family when his mother saw he would lose his soul. He is fiercely protective of Jaz and eventually the two fall in love. Though he appears around 35, he is over 250 years old and is described as dangerously attractive. He is also one of only two vampires to escape from a vampere household alive and has fathered one fledgling. Due to his extreme age, he often uses outmoded phrases and words, and he is terrified of snakes and sleeping in coffins.

He has a degree of magical ability, though he rarely uses it, preferring to rely on his swordsmanship and vampire abilities. He can move faster, is stronger, and has better reflexes and senses than any human. Through blood consumption of the target he can read their motives and emotions, and so he always does this on the job to prevent him from killing an innocent. His eyes change color depending on his emotions, e.g. emerald green for desire, black for extreme anger (but only Jaz is able to tell). Due to an attempt by his fledgling, Disa, to get him to return to his vampire house, he no longer sleeps through the entire day, instead waking up a couple of hours before sunset and being unable to fall asleep until a couple of hours after sunrise. He is also the only vampire to have two cantrantias or core powers. His original one is called wraith, the ability to manipulate how cold the temperature is. This works on an atmospheric and local scale, though the bigger the area the more it tires him. After taking Jaz's blood, which also temporarily increases all his powers, he has the ability, through blood, to absorb and use permanently the cantrantia of another vampire, making him, potentially, the most powerful vampire in the world.

== Book releases ==
Installments have typically been released during the same month in the United Kingdom, Canada, and the United States, with the US and Canadian releases being simultaneous.

Book #	Title	UK release	US/CAN release
1	Once Bitten, Twice Shy	October 18, 2007	October 8, 2007
In the series opener, Jaz and Vayl are tasked with finding a plastic surgeon who uses his skills to disguise criminals. In the process, they become targeted themselves, and are faced with matters from their respective pasts.
2	Another One Bites the Dust	December 6, 2007	December 12, 2007
In an attempt to recover stolen biotechnology, Jaz and Vayl go undercover as they search for an ancient vampire from China.
3	Biting the Bullet	February 7, 2008	February 11, 2008
Edward "The Raptor" Samos, one of the CIA's most formidable opponents, has resurfaced, prompting a major collaborative effort between Jaz, Vayl, and a Special Ops unit led by Jaz's brother David. Vayl and Jaz face respective personal distractions, while at the same time, other paranormal factions and individuals with agendas of their own begin to emerge.
4	Bitten to Death	September 4, 2008	August 12, 2008
Jaz faces family issues as her brother's career is put in jeopardy and her father's sanity lies in question. In addition, the battle with The Raptor continues in Patras, Greece, where a new player arrives as the team meets a woman with ties to Vayl's past.
5	One More Bite	January 5, 2009	January 5, 2009
With power suddenly up for grabs, various paranormal factions begin a struggle for supremacy. In the interests of keeping things balanced, Parks and Vayl must step in to protect one of the world's leading witches from assassination. It appears that the assassin, however, is a woman whose skill rivals that of Jaz.
6	Bite Marks	October 2009	October 2009
The sixth novel, in which the team has to protect the NASA program from the attack of gnomes, and discover why Jaz keeps hearing voices in her head that are not her own.
7	Bitten in Two	November 2010	November 2010
The seventh novel. Soon after starting their next mission the team finds that Vayl is momentarily stuck in his past and thinks he's in 1700.
8	The Deadliest Bite	June 2011	June 2011
The Deadliest Bite concludes the story.

== Reception ==
Critical reception for the series has been positive, with RT Book Reviews praising most of the series. Publishers Weekly called Once Bitten, Twice Shy an "entertaining but derivative debut," going on to say that "Jaz's jittery narration amuses, but the fang-filled plot, replete with action licks and paranormal theatrics, will have trouble standing out in this overcrowded field."
