= S. D. Tooley =

American novelist

Lee Driver (author)
- Born: Sandra D. Tooley
- Occupation: Novelist
- Writing career
- Genre: mystery and urban fantasy
- Website: www.sdtooley.com

Sandra D. Tooley is a mystery and urban fantasy novelist who publishes as S. D. Tooley and Lee Driver. Her books have won a number of awards.

== Biography ==
The author was raised in a suburb south of Chicago, Illinois, and she currently resides in Northwest Indiana. She cites Nancy Drew, Stephen King, and James Patterson as her primary influences.

As S.D. Tooley, she writes the Sam Casey Mystery series which is set in a suburb south of Chicago. The series features Samantha Casey, a Detective Sergeant with the ability to speak with the dead. She has also published The Skull, the first installment in the Remy and Roadkill Mystery series for ages 12 to 112, under this name.

As Lee Driver, she writes the Chase Dagger Mystery series which is set in a fictional suburb of Northwest Indiana. The series features a private detective "who seems to inherit the most unusual cases." Dagger's assistant, Sara Morningsky, is a young Native American woman who has the ability to transform into a hawk or wolf. His pet, a scarlet macaw named Einstein, has a photographic memory.

Besides print editions, all of her titles are available in audio book from Books in Motion and as eBook downloads in all formats from Smashwords.com. Four of her titles are also in large print from Ulverscroft.

== Novels ==
=== Sam Casey Mysteries ===
- When the Dead Speak (1999)
- Nothing Else Matters (2000)
- Restless Spirit (2002)
- Echoes from the Grave (2007)
- What Lies Within (2010)

=== Remy and Roadkill Mystery ===
- The Skull (2006)

=== Chase Dagger Mystery ===
- The Good Die Twice (1999)
- Full Moon, Bloody Moon (2000)
- The Unseen (2004)
- Chasing Ghosts (2008)

== Awards ==
The Skull, her mystery for middle school audiences, was awarded the Ida Chittum Award for best mystery. Nothing Else Matters won ForeWord Magazine's Book of the Year Award in 2000. Restless Spirit won ForeWord Magazine's Book of the Year Award in 2002.
