= Vampire: The Masquerade (disambiguation) =

Vampire: The Masquerade is a 1991 tabletop role-playing game.

It may also refer to:

- Vampire: The Masquerade (Vault Comics), a comic book series
- Vampire: The Masquerade, a video game series based on the tabletop game
  - Vampire: The Masquerade – Redemption, a 2000 video game
  - Vampire: The Masquerade – Bloodlines, a 2004 video game
  - Vampire: The Masquerade – Coteries of New York, a 2019 video game
  - Vampire: The Masquerade – Shadows of New York, a 2020 video game
  - Vampire: The Masquerade – Bloodhunt, a 2021 video game
  - Vampire: The Masquerade – Swansong, a 2022 video game
  - Vampire: The Masquerade (Choice of Games), a line of interactive fiction video games
  - Vampire: The Masquerade – Bloodlines 2, a 2025 video game

== See also ==
- Vampire: The Requiem, a 2004 reboot of the 1991 tabletop game
