= Saving Zoë (novel) =

Novel by Alyson Noël

- First edition
- Language: English
- Genre: Fiction
- Publication date: 2007
- Publication place: United States
- Pages: 230
- ISBN: 0312355106

Saving Zoë is a 2007 fiction book written by Alyson Noël. The book's plot follows a fifteen-year-old girl named Echo who is coping with the murder of her older sister, Zoe. Everything changes when Zoe's boyfriend shows Zoe's diary to Echo. The book was adapted into a film in 2019.

== Reception ==
Amy Alessio of Teenreads wrote, "Zoe’s diary will reach the emotions of readers of Alyson Noel’s moving and compelling novel while bringing peace and understanding to Echo." Books With Bite wrote, "Beautifully written and strongly proposed, this book will grab you at your heart." Zoë Byrne of Seven Ponds wrote, "In Saving Zoë, Noël poignantly blends twinkles of humor from more typical teen trysts, such as navigating through all of the confusing moments with first experiences of love and dealing with difficult parents, to heart-wrenching moments where an overwhelming amount grief, loneliness and sadness consume Echo’s daily functioning in the days right before and months right after the first anniversary of Zoë’s death."

== Film adaptation ==
In 2019 the book was adapted into a film of the same name; starring Laura and Vanessa Marano.
