= Evermore (novel) =

Fantasy novel by Alyson Noël, part of the Immortals series

- Cover art for Evermore
- Author: Alyson Noël
- Language: English
- Series: The Immortals (books)
- Genre: Fantasy novel
- Publisher: St. Martin's Press
- Publication date: February 2009
- Publication place: United States
- Media type: Print (paperback)
- Pages: 320 (paperback edition)
- ISBN: 0-312-53275-X (US paperback edition)
- OCLC: 234439946
- LC Class: PZ7.N67185 Ev 2009
- Followed by: Blue Moon (Noel novel)

Evermore is a fantasy novel by Alyson Noël released in 2009. It is the first novel in the Immortals series. Evermore was an immediate bestseller and, as of October 11, 2009, had spent 34 weeks on the New York Times Best Seller list for children's books.

== Characters ==
Ever Bloom: Ever is the protagonist and narrator of the story. Having lost her family in a tragic car accident, she struggles to cope with her new life living with her aunt, frequently blaming herself for her family's deaths and wishing it on herself. Having once been confident, popular and easy-going, she becomes a recluse, often branded a 'freak' by classmates as she can read thoughts as well as knowing parts of people's life at the touch. She despises this; she wishes her powers would be gone and to go back to the normal life she had before. Until, one day, a new boy joins her class. She tries to ignore him at first, but she gradually falls in love, and her world totally changes.

Damen Auguste Esposito : Damen Auguste is an Immortal, the first one to ever exist. His father made an elixir that promotes everlasting life, along with Damen knowing the recipe. He fell in love with Ever when he first met her, after he and his wife (Drina Magdalena Augusta) separated. Life after life, Ever's reincarnations were killed in "accidents". He always began to lose hope before Ever appeared in his life again. Damen has access to Summerland, a place where dead souls that did not cross over stay. According to the book, he is more than six hundred years old. Granted by his immortality, great artists like William Shakespeare, Pablo Picasso and Vincent van Gogh had given him pieces of artwork.

Sabine: Sabine is Ever's aunt who takes care of Ever and stays with her after her family died. Although Ever is thankful for Sabine taking her in, she often feels like she took away Sabine's freedom. The book describes her profession as an attorney. She is mostly out of house, busy in her work and earns great money.

Riley Bloom: Ever's 12-year-old little sister who died in the car accident. Ever is frequently visited by Riley's ghost who always butts into Ever's life or gives her information on every celebrity in the universe.

Drina Auguste: Drina Auguste was Damen's wife and one of the first Immortals. She is highly ruthless and has always believed that she is superior to others. She is madly in love with Damen and will stop at nothing to get him back. She has been killing Ever's reincarnations one after the other in a sadistic way. Drina hopes that Damen will see that he loves her, not Ever and that humans don't deserve his compassion. She is killed by Ever during their second fight in Ever's kitchen.

Ava: Ava is a psychic far less powerful than Ever or Damen. She can see people's thoughts with less accuracy and can see dead souls. Ava was hired by Ever's Aunt Sabine for a Halloween party where she saw Riley. She tried to convince her to cross to the other side and turned to Ever when she failed. Ever noticed she had a violet aura, which stands for "Highly spiritual, wisdom, intuition". Ava also taught Ever to make a shield around her which really helped her to forget of thought-hearing and aura-seeing and to mix with other people like a normal girl.

Haven: One of Ever's only friends. Haven is very self-conscious and eager to fit in with other people, and constantly changes her style to achieve this. She adores cupcakes and shows a very keen interest in Damen, and gets very agitated when he only pays attention to Ever and not her. Haven becomes affiliated with Drina, much to Ever's dismay, which causes huge problems later in the story.

Miles: An over-the-top drama queen, Miles adores being in the spotlight. Constantly found texting his latest boyfriend, gossiping or practicing the lines to his lead role in the musical Hairspray. Although unaware of Ever's secret he has always been a true friend to her.

Stacia Miller: An extremely popular girl at Ever's school who constantly taunts Ever. She ridicules her with rude comments such as "loser" or "freak". She is jealous of Ever for getting the hot new guy when no one else could. She blackmails and threatens people to get her way. When Ever was addicted to drinking Stacia pretended to be her friend and drank with her but just enough not to get drunk, then later turned Ever into the principal where she got suspended.

== Adaptations ==
On March 28, 2011, Alyson Noël announced that all 10 books in both The Immortals and The Riley Bloom Series have been optioned by Summit Entertainment.
