= The Immortals (Noël series) =

Novel series by Alyson Noël

- Author: Alyson Noël
- Language: English
- No. of books: 6

The Immortals is a sequence of novels written by Alyson Noël, focusing on psychics and immortals. The first two books, Evermore and Blue Moon, are New York Times Bestsellers.

== Plot ==
Since a horrible accident claimed the lives of her family, 16-year-old Ever can see auras, hear people’s thoughts, and know a person’s life story by touch. Going out of her way to shield herself from human contact to suppress her abilities has branded her as a freak at her new high school—but everything changes when she meets Damen Auguste.

Damen is gorgeous, exotic and wealthy, cute and he holds many secrets. Ever does not know who he really is—or what he is. Damen is equal parts light and dark, and he belongs to an enchanted new world where no one ever dies.

== Books in the series ==
- Evermore (February 3, 2009)
- Blue Moon (July 7, 2009)
- Shadowland (November 17, 2009)
- Dark Flame (June 22, 2010)
- Night Star (November 16, 2010)
- Everlasting (June 7, 2011)

Alyson Noel also wrote a spin-off series called the Riley Bloom Series, featuring Ever's sister, Riley.

On March 28, 2011, author Alyson Noel announced that the rights to all 10 books in both The Immortals and Riley Bloom Series have been optioned by Summit Entertainment.
