= Alyson Noël =

Writer

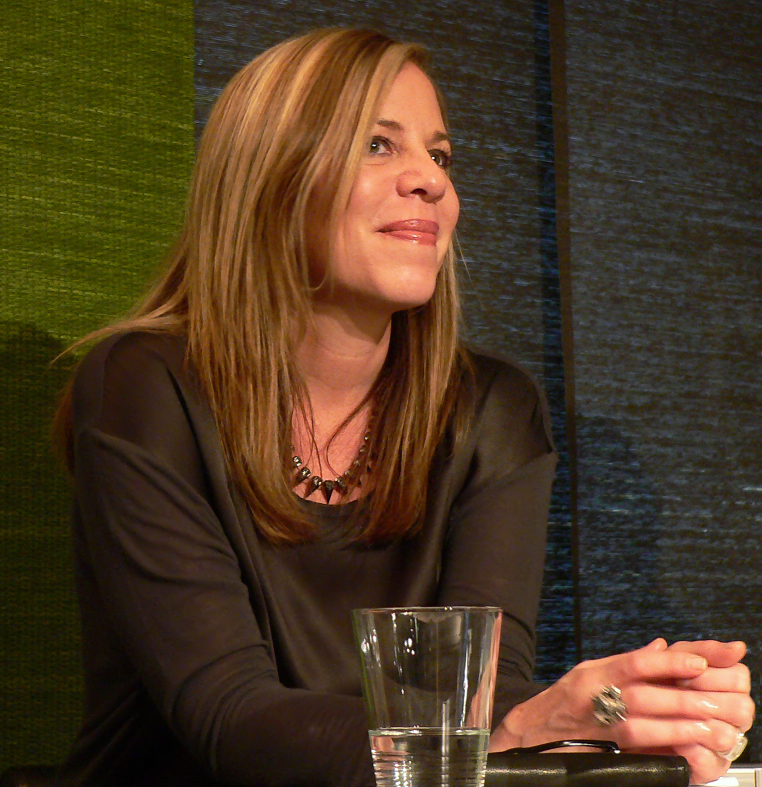
- New York Times bestselling author
- Born: December 3, 1965 (age 60); Laguna Beach, California, U.S.
- Occupation: Writer
- Writing career
- Period: 2005–present
- Genres: Young adult, paranormal romance, chick lit
- Notable works: Soul Seekers Series; Immortals Series; Riley Bloom series
- Website: www.alysonnoel.com

Alyson Noël (born December 3, 1965) is an American author from Orange County, California.

== Biography ==
Alyson Noël was born on December 3, 1965, raised in Orange County and attended Richard Nixon Elementary School for two years. She is the youngest of three girls born to her divorced parents. After leaving her high school, Troy High School, she moved to Mykonos, Greece and lived there. Afterward, she moved to Manhattan, New York, where she worked as a flight attendant for Delta Air Lines. She now lives in Laguna Beach, California. She has had a variety of jobs such as babysitter, department store sales clerk, administrative assistant, office manager, jewelry maker, T-shirt painter, and front desk hotel clerk, in addition to flight attendant and considers herself an author. She was inspired to become an author after reading Are You There God? It's Me, Margaret by Judy Blume, in the sixth grade. Her first book was the young-adult novel, Faking 19, which explores the lifestyles of teens today.

On March 28, 2011, Alyson Noël announced that all 10 books in both The Immortals and The Riley Bloom series have been optioned by Summit Entertainment. On June 28, 2012 Alyson Noël stated on Twitter that all 4 books in the Soul Seekers Series have been optioned for film by Cheyenne Enterprises. On September 9, 2015, Noël tweeted that there will be a future film adaptation for Saving Zoë starring sisters and actresses, Laura Marano and Vanessa Marano.

== Bibliography ==
=== The Immortals Series ===
- Evermore (February 3, 2009)
- Blue Moon (July 7, 2009)
- Shadowland (November 17, 2009)
- Dark Flame (June 22, 2010)
- Night Star (November 16, 2010)
- Everlasting (June 7, 2011)

=== The Riley Bloom Series ===
- Radiance (August 31, 2010)
- Shimmer (March 15, 2011)
- Dreamland (September 13, 2011)
- Whisper (April 24, 2012)

=== The Soul Seekers Series ===
- Fated (May 22, 2012)
- Echo (November 13, 2012)
- Mystic (May 7, 2013)
- Horizon (November 19, 2013)

=== The Beautiful Idols Series ===
- Unrivaled (May 10, 2016)
- Blacklist (April 4, 2017)
- Infamous (April 3, 2018)

=== The Stolen Beauty Series ===
- Stealing Infinity (June 28, 2022)
- Ruling Destiny (June 6, 2023)
- Chasing Eternity (June 4, 2024)

=== Standalone novels ===
- Faking 19 (2005)
- Art Geeks and Prom Queens (September 1, 2005)
- Laguna Cove (2006)
- Fly Me to the Moon (2006)
- Kiss & Blog (2007)
- Saving Zoë (2007)
- Cruel Summer (2008)
- Forever Summer (2011)- Compilation of Cruel Summer and Laguna Cove.
- Keeping Secrets (2012)- Compilation of Faking 19 and Saving Zoe.
- Five Days of Famous (2016)
- The Bone Thief (2017)
- Field Guide to the Supernatural Universe (2022)

=== Contributions to anthologies ===
- Tattooed Love Boys (2007) – short story in the anthology "First Kiss (Then Tell)" edited by Cylin Busby.
- Bring Me Back to Life (2010) – short story in the anthology "Kisses from Hell".
- Silent All These Years (2011) – short story in the anthology "Dear Bully" edited by Megan Kelley Hall & Carrie Jones.

== Awards ==
- Art Geeks & Prom Queens—NYLA Book of Winter, 2006
- Art Geeks & Prom Queens—Nominated Teens Top Ten, 2006
- Saving Zoe—National Reader's Choice Award Winner, 2007

== See also ==
- The Immortals
- Riley Bloom Series
