= Heartless =

Heartless may refer to:

== Books ==
- Heartless (Carriger novel), a 2011 novel in the New York Times best-selling "Parasol Protectorate" series by Gail Carriger
- Heartless (Pretty Little Liars), a 2010 novel in the "Pretty Little Liars" series by Sara Shepherd

== Film ==
- Heartless (1995 film), a short film directed by Emanuele Crialese
- Heartless (1997 film), a television film starring Mädchen Amick
- Heartless (2005 film) (also known as Lethal Seduction), a film directed by Robert Markowitz
- Heartless (2009 film), a British horror film directed by Philip Ridley
- Heartless (2014 film), a Bollywood romantic thriller film directed by Shekhar Suman
- Heartless, a Japanese drama film starring Daichi Kaneko

== Music ==
- Heartless (album), by Pallbearer, 2017
- Heartless (mixtape), by Moneybagg Yo, 2017
- "Heartless" (Diplo song), 2019
- "Heartless" (Heart song), 1976
- "Heartless" (Kanye West song), 2008, covered by The Fray and other artists
- "Heartless" (King Von song), 2023
- "Heartless" (Polo G song), 2019
- "Heartless" (The Weeknd song), 2019
- "Heartless", a 1994 song by Godflesh from the album Selfless
- "The Heartless", a 1997 song by HIM from the album Greatest Lovesongs Vol. 666
- "Heartless", a 1999 song by God Forbid from the album Reject the Sickness
- "Heartless", a 2004 song by Converge from the album You Fail Me
- "Heartless", a 2005 song by A Day to Remember from the album And Their Name Was Treason
- "Heartless", a 2007 song by Architects from the album Ruin
- "Heartless", a 2010 song by Carnifex from the album Hell Chose Me
- "Heartless", a 2017 song by Denzel Curry from the EP 13
- "Heartless", a 2010 song by Justin Nozuka from the album You I Wind Land and Sea
- "HeartLess", a 2018 song by Madison Beer from the EP As She Pleases
- "HeartLess", a 2020 song by Onefour
- "Heartless", a 2024 song by Galneryus from the album The Stars Will Light the Way

== Television ==
- Heartless (TV series), a 2014–15 Danish TV fantasy series
- "Heartless" (Once Upon a Time), an episode of the sixth season of Once Upon a Time

== Other ==
- Heartless (Kingdom Hearts), a form of monster in the Kingdom Hearts video game series
- Heartless (online game), an online card game developed by Free Fall Associates

== See also ==
- Heart (disambiguation)
- Akuji the Heartless, a 1998 action-adventure video game
- Heartless Bastards, a garage rock band
- Heartless Bitches International, a humorous women's website
- Heartless Crew, UK garage group of disc jockeys
