= Bitch (slang) =

Pejorative slang word for a person or thing, mainly a woman

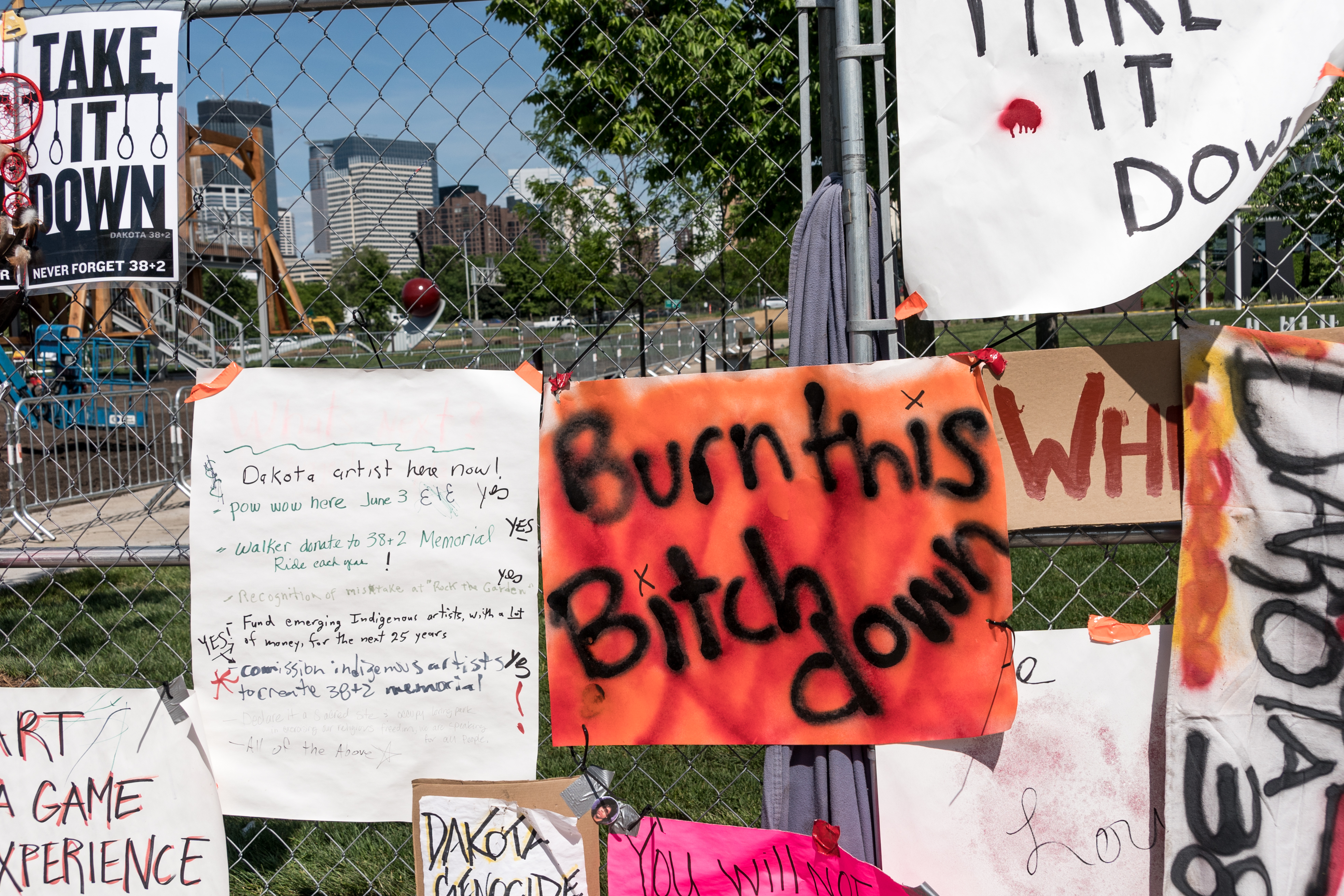
- Slang usage of bitch in a protest in June 2017
- Pronunciation: (/bɪtʃ/)

Definition
- In a literal sense: Female dog
- Figuratively: A woman or girl who is belligerent, unreasonable, malicious, controlling, aggressive, or dominant or a woman in general A man or boy who is subordinate, weak, or cowardly

In the English language, bitch (/bɪtʃ/) as a slang term is a pejorative for a person, usually a woman. The term bitch is one of the most common profanities in the English language. The word is considered taboo on television, and euphemisms such as "the B-word" are sometimes used to minimize its negative impact.

When applied to a woman or girl, it means someone who is belligerent, unreasonable, malicious, controlling, aggressive, or dominant. When used as a "term of contempt towards women", it is considered by some to be a slur that fosters sexism against women. It can also be used as a synonym of woman, particularly in hip-hop music. When applied to a man or boy, bitch reverses its meaning and is a derogatory term for being subordinate, weak, or cowardly.

The term bitch literally means a female dog. Its original use as a vulgarism carried a meaning suggesting high sexual desire in a woman, comparable to a dog in heat. The range of meanings has expanded in modern usage (such as when applied to a man).

In a feminist context, the word can indicate a strong or assertive woman and has therefore been reappropriated by some women. Similarly, in gay speech the word bitch can refer approvingly to a man who is unusually assertive or has the characteristics used pejoratively of a woman.

== History ==
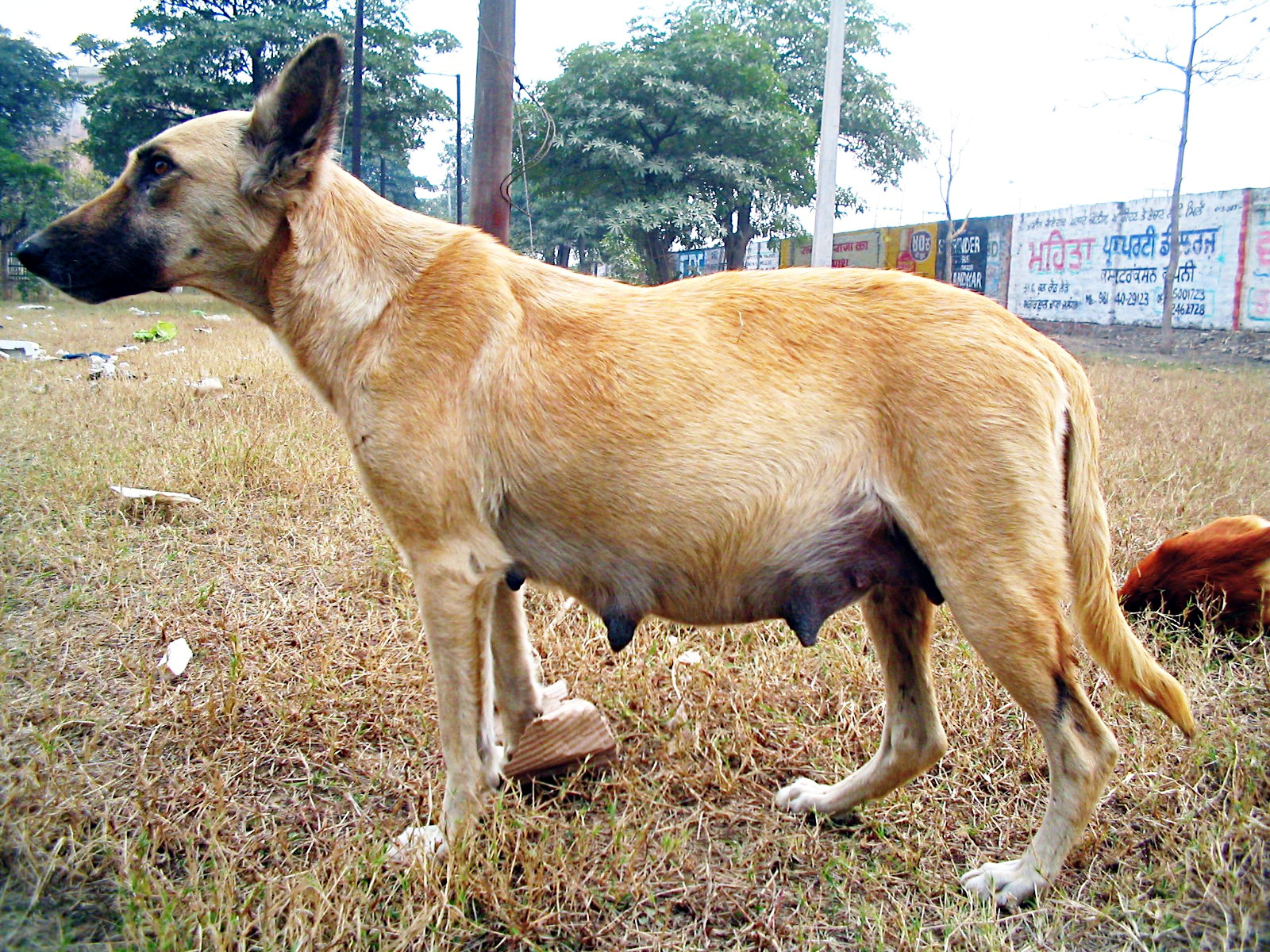
Literally, a bitch is a female dog; as an insult, it originally compared a woman to a dog in heat

According to the Oxford English Dictionary, the term bitch comes from the Old English word bicce or bicge, meaning "female dog", which dates to around 1000 CE. It may have derived from the earlier Old Norse word bikkja, also meaning "female dog".

"Dog" has long been used as an insult toward both women and men. In ancient Greece, dog was often used in a derogatory sense to refer to someone whose behavior was improper or transgressive. This could include shamelessness or lack of restraint, lack of hospitality, lack of loyalty, and indiscriminate or excessive violence, among other qualities. Over time, classicist C. Franco argues, a "persistent symbolic connection" developed between dogs and women in Greek literature that expressed and reinforced women's subordinate position in society and their supposedly inferior nature.

There may also be a connection between less literal senses of "bitch" and the Greek goddess Artemis. As she is the goddess of the hunt, she was often portrayed with a pack of hunting dogs and sometimes transformed into an animal herself. She was seen as free, vigorous, cold, impetuous, unsympathetic, wild, and beautiful.

The earliest use of "bitch" specifically as a derogatory term for women dates to the 15th century. Its earliest slang meaning mainly referred to sexual behavior, according to the English language historian Geoffrey Hughes:

The early applications were to a promiscuous or sensual woman, a metaphorical extension of the behavior of a bitch in heat. Herein lies the original point of the powerful insult son of a bitch, found as biche sone ca. 1330 in Arthur and Merlin ... while in a spirited exchange in the Chester Play (ca. 1400) a character demands: "Whom callest thou queine, skabde bitch?" ("Who are you calling a whore, you miserable bitch?").

Bitch remained a strong insult through the nineteenth century. The entry in Francis Grose's Dictionary of the Vulgar Tongue (1785) reads:

A she dog, or doggess; the most offensive appellation that can be given to an English woman, even more provoking than that of whore, as may be gathered from the regular Billinsgate or St Giles answer—"I may be a whore, but can't be a bitch."

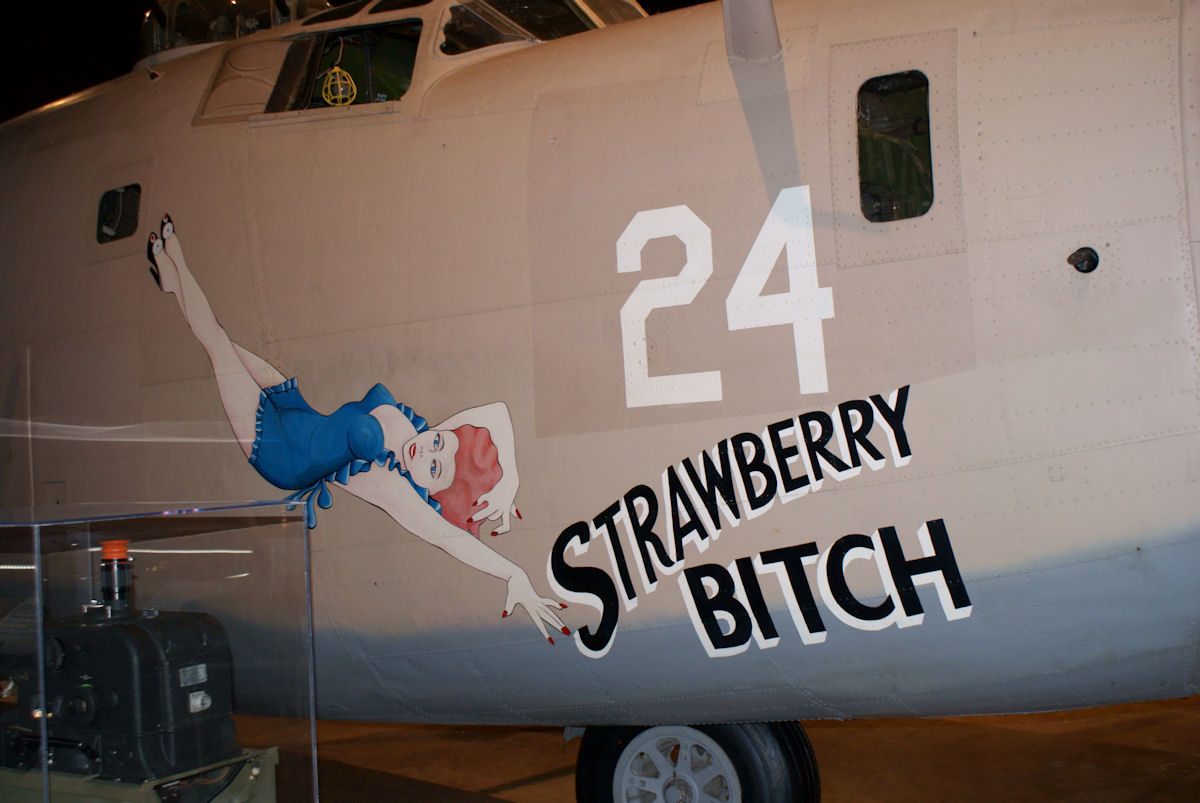
A preserved Consolidated B-24 Liberator at the National Museum of the United States Air Force with nose art titled "Strawberry Bitch" from c. 1942. Airplanes were often painted by American flight crews and named after women, popular characters or slang based on the art in magazines at the time.

Throughout the word's evolution into the nineteenth century, it became gradually less offensive. The Oxford English Dictionary in the nineteenth century described the insult as "strictly a lewd or sensual woman". The word went through many similar phases throughout history. It was not until the 20th century that feminism began to reevaluate the term and its appropriation.

In the 1920s, bitch became once again a common insult used against women. The term bitch became more popular in common language during this era. Between 1915 and 1930, the use of "bitch" in newspapers and literature more than doubled. The writing of Ernest Hemingway popularized the more modern meaning of "bitch" in this era. He used it to represent favorable qualities such as ferocity, edginess, and grit. It was during this time that women began gaining more freedom (such as the right to vote through the Nineteenth Amendment). The word "bitch" during the twenties meant "malicious or consciously attempting to harm", "difficult, annoying, or interfering", and "sexually brazen or overly vulgar".

According to Dr. Timothy Jay, there are "over 70 different taboo words", but 80 percent of the time only ten words are used, and bitch is included in that set. Being called the term bitch has been associated with worsening the mental health of women.

It has been characterized as "an archaic word demeaning women since as early as the 15th century" that seeks to control women.

== Modern use ==
In modern usage, the slang term bitch has different meanings depending largely on social context and may vary from very offensive to endearing, and as with many slang terms, its meaning and nuances can vary depending on the region in which it is used.

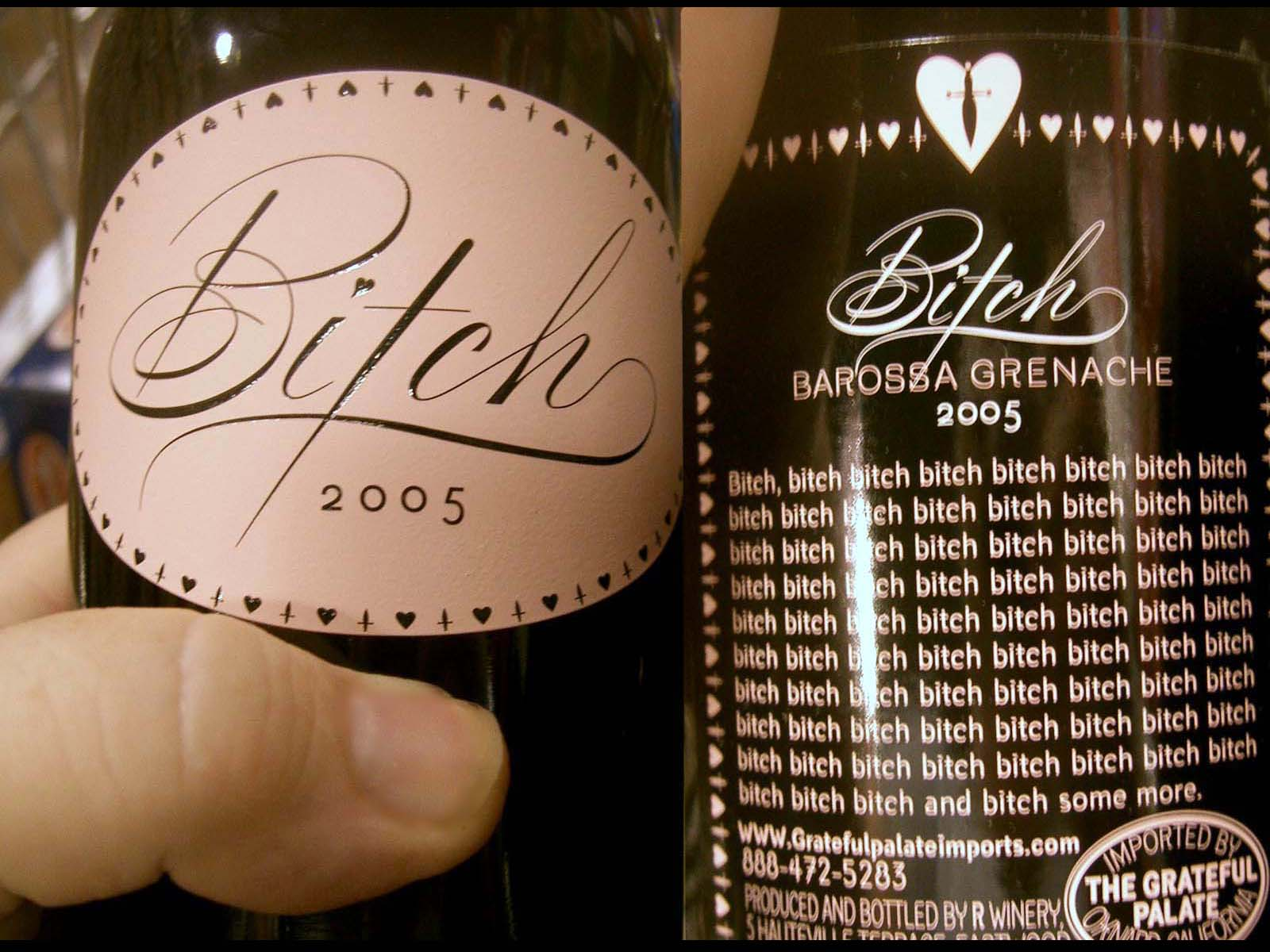
Bitch wine. "Bitch" has been reappropriated to have positive meanings in some contexts

The term bitch can refer to a person or thing that is very difficult, as in "Life's a bitch" or "He sure got the bitch end of that deal". It is common for insults to lose intensity as their meaning broadens ("bastard" is another example). In the film The Women (1939), Joan Crawford could only allude to the word: "And by the way, there's a name for you ladies, but it isn't used in high society—outside of a kennel." At the time, use of the actual word would have been censored by the Hays Office. By 1974, Elton John had a hit single (#4 in the U.S. and #14 in the U.K.) with "The Bitch Is Back", in which he says "bitch" repeatedly. It was, however, censored by some radio stations. On late night U.S. television, the character Emily Litella (1976–1978) on Saturday Night Live (portrayed by Gilda Radner) would frequently refer to Jane Curtin under her breath at the end of their Weekend Update routine in this way: "Oh! Never mind...! Bitch!"

Bitchin' arose in the 1950s to describe something found to be desirable or exciting.

Modern use can include self-description, often as an unfairly difficult person. For example, in The Bitch in the House by Cathi Hanauer, a woman describes her marriage: "I'm fine all day at work, but as soon as I get home, I'm a horror....I'm the bitch in the house." Boy George admitted "I was being a bitch" in a falling out with Elton John.

Generally, the term bitch is still considered offensive, and not accepted in formal situations. According to linguist Deborah Tannen, "Bitch is the most contemptible thing you can say about a woman. Save perhaps the four-letter C word." It's common for the word to be censored on prime time TV, often rendered as "the b-word". During the 2008 U.S. presidential campaign, a John McCain supporter referred to Hillary Clinton by asking, "How do we beat the bitch?" The event was reported in censored format:

On CNN's "The Situation Room," Washington Post media critic and CNN "Reliable Sources" host Howard Kurtz observed that "Senator McCain did not embrace the 'b' word that this woman in the audience used." ABC reporter Kate Snow adopted the same locution. On CNN's "Out in the Open," Rick Sanchez characterized the word without using it by saying, "Last night, we showed you a clip of one of his supporters calling Hillary Clinton the b-word that rhymes with witch." A local Fox 25 news reporter made the same move when he rhymed the unspoken word with rich.

A study reported that, when used on social media, bitch "aims to promote traditional, cultural beliefs about femininity". Used hundreds of thousands of times per day on such platforms, it is associated with sexist harassment, "victimizing targets", and "shaming" victims who do not abide by degrading notions about femininity.

=== Reappropriation ===
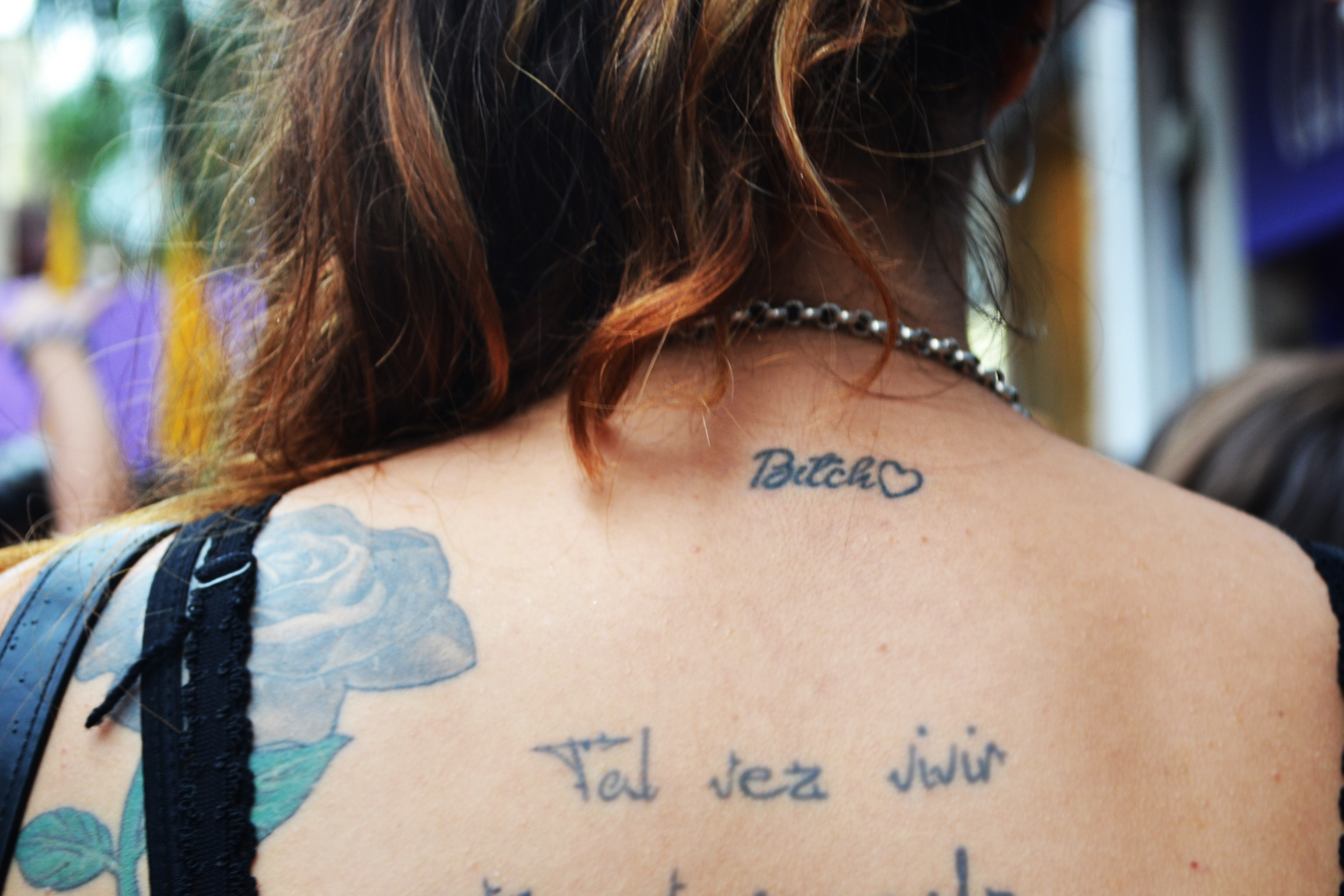
A woman at an International Day of the Woman march in Sante Fe Argentina, with a tattoo of the word bitch on her back

In the context of modern feminism, bitch has varied reappropriated meanings that may connote a strong female (anti-stereotype of weak submissive woman), cunning (equal to males in mental guile), or else it may be used as a tongue-in cheek backhanded compliment for someone who has excelled in an achievement. For example, Bitch magazine describes itself as a "feminist response to pop culture".

Feminist attorney Jo Freeman (Joreen) authored "The BITCH Manifesto" in 1968:

A Bitch takes shit from no one. You may not like her, but you cannot ignore her. ... [Bitches] have loud voices and often use them. Bitches are not pretty. ... Bitches seek their identity strictly thru themselves and what they do. They are subjects, not objects. ... Often they do dominate other people when roles are not available to them which more creatively sublimate their energies and utilize their capabilities. More often they are accused of domineering when doing what would be considered natural by a man.

Bitch has also been reappropriated by hip-hop culture, rappers use the adjective "bad bitch" to refer to an independent, confident, attractive woman. The term is used in a complimentary way, meaning the woman is desirable. One of the first instances of "bitch" being used in this way is in the song "Da Baddest Bitch" by Trina, released in 1999. This can also be seen throughout multiple different songs from Rihanna's song entitled "Bad Bitch" featuring Beyoncé which reiterates the line "I'm a bad bitch" multiple times. "BitchSlut" by Anna Wise prominently uses the words bitch and slut to reclaim identity. This use of the word bitch shows women reappropriating the meaning to be a more positive and empowering word for women.

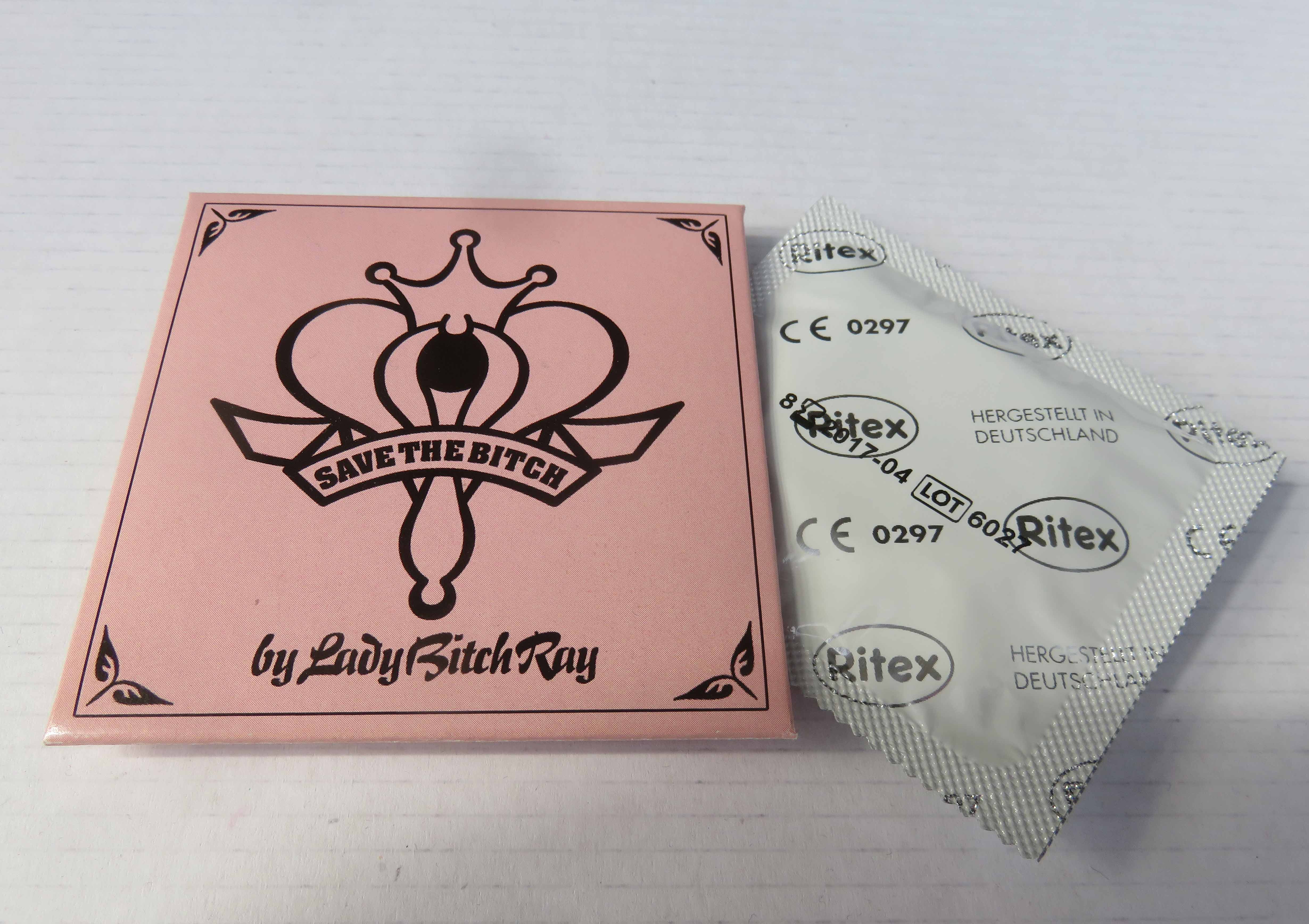
A condom branded by rap signer Lady Bitch Ray

The increased usage of the word bitch casually or in a friendly way by women has been characterized by Sherryl Kleynman as a result of the absorption of sexist culture by women. Such usage has been cited by Kleinman et al. as increasing the perception the word is acceptable and excusing men who use it against women.

==== Pop culture ====
In pop culture, the use of the term bitch has increased through media such as television, movies, magazines, social media, etc. The use of the word "bitch" on television shows tripled between 1998 and 2007, which had much to do with the word's feminist facelift in the previous decade.

In a 2006 interview titled "Pop Goes the Feminist", Bitch magazine co-founder Andi Zeisler explained the naming of the magazine:

When we chose the name, we were thinking, well, it would be great to reclaim the word "bitch" for strong, outspoken women, much the same way that "queer" has been reclaimed by the gay community. That was very much on our minds, the positive power of language reclamation.

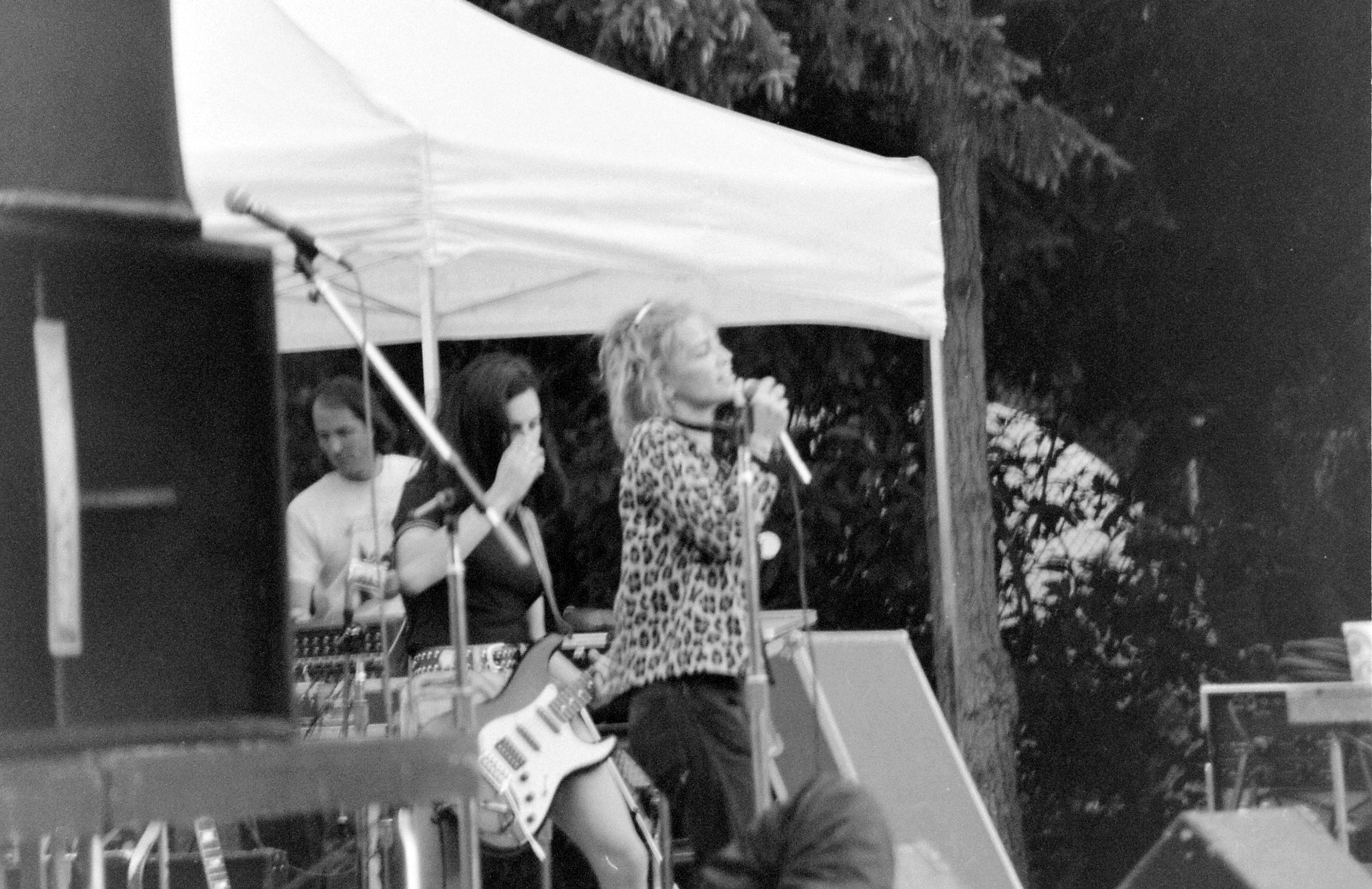
The band 7 Year Bitch in concert

Pop culture contains a number of slogans of self-identification based on bitch. For example:

- "You call me 'Bitch' like it's a bad thing."
- "I go zero to bitch in 3.5 seconds."

There are several backronyms. Heartless Bitches International is a club with the slogan "Because we know BITCH means: Being In Total Control, Honey!" Other imagined acronyms include:

- "Beautiful Intelligent Talented Creative Honest"
- "Beautiful Individual That Causes Hardons"
- "Babe In Total Control of Herself".

As stated in Scallen's Bitch Thesis, "As Asim demonstrates with his discussion of the appropriation of the N word by black communities, the term bitch is deployed in pop culture in multiple ways (with multiple meanings) at the same time." Derogatory terms are constantly appropriated. Many women, such as Nicki Minaj, refer to themselves as bitches. By calling oneself a bitch in today's culture, these women are referencing their success, money, sexuality, and power. Asha Layne's article Now That's a Bad Bitch!: The State of Women in Hip-Hop, "The change in the meaning of the word thus subverts the tools of oppression used to dominate women to now empower them."

=== Hip hop culture ===
Some early uses of the word in hip-hop music include Duke Bootee's classic 1983 song with Grandmaster Flash, 'New York New York,' and Slick Rick's 'La Di Da Di' (1985), marked the emergence of 'bitch' in hip-hop lyrics. Since then, artists and followers of the culture have frequently used the term, with variations like 'bee-otch' popularized by Oakland-based rapper Too $hort in the late 1980s.

Reaching back to the dozens and dirty blues, early rappers like Slick Rick established the bitch as a character: a woman, often treacherous, but sometimes simply déclassé. N.W.A.'s song 'One Less Bitch' exemplifies misogynistic attitudes, equating women with negative stereotypes such as 'money hungry scandalous groupies.' These lyrics highlight the ongoing tensions within hip-hop culture regarding gender representation and language usage. While some misogynistic rap perpetuates harmful stereotypes of women as 'money-hungry, scandalous, manipulating, and demanding, 'as stated by Adams and Fuller (2006), the word has also been directed towards men, often to denote subordination or perceived inferiority toward "unmanly" or homosexual men. An example of this is the song Bitches 2 by Ice-T, which gives an example of a male "bitch" in each verse.

However, amidst the prevalence of derogatory usage, female hip-hop artists have challenged the word's appropriation by male rappers. Queen Latifah's 1993 track 'U.N.I.T.Y.' confronts this misogyny, demanding, "Who you callin' a bitch?" Similarly, Roxanne Shante and MC Lyte reclaimed the term, with Shante even releasing an album entitled 'The Bitch Is Back' in 1992. Popular culture has inspired women to redefine the word bitch as a euphemism for "Strong black woman". A modern example would be Megan Thee Stallion's track 'B.I.T.C.H.' which exemplifies this; flipping the script to portray 'bitch' as a descriptor of self-respect and autonomy.

In 2016, Kanye West released his seventh studio album called The Life of Pablo. On the song called "Famous" West raps, "I feel like me and Taylor might still have sex / Why? I made that bitch famous." This sparked a controversy with Taylor Swift as she "cautioned him about releasing a song with such a strong misogynistic message." These lyrics highlight the ongoing tensions within hip-hop culture regarding gender. In response to Swift's remarks, West went on Twitter and posted a tweet which said how the word "bitch" is an endearing term in hip hop like the word "nigga".

== In reference to men ==
When used to describe a male, bitch may also confer the meaning of subordinate, especially to another male, as in prison. Generally, this term is used to indicate that the person is acting outside the confines of their gender roles, such as when women are assertive or aggressive, or when men are passive or servile. According to James Coyne from the Department of Psychology at the University of California, "'Bitch' serves the social function of isolating and discrediting a class of people who do not conform to the socially accepted patterns of behavior."

== Idioms ==
=== Son of a bitch ===
The first known appearance of "son-of-a-bitch" in a work of American fiction is Seventy-Six (1823), a historical fiction novel set during the American Revolutionary War by eccentric writer and critic John Neal. The protagonist, Jonathan Oadley, recounts a battle scene in which he is mounted on a horse: "I wheeled, made a dead set at the son-of-a-bitch in my rear, unhorsed him, and actually broke through the line."

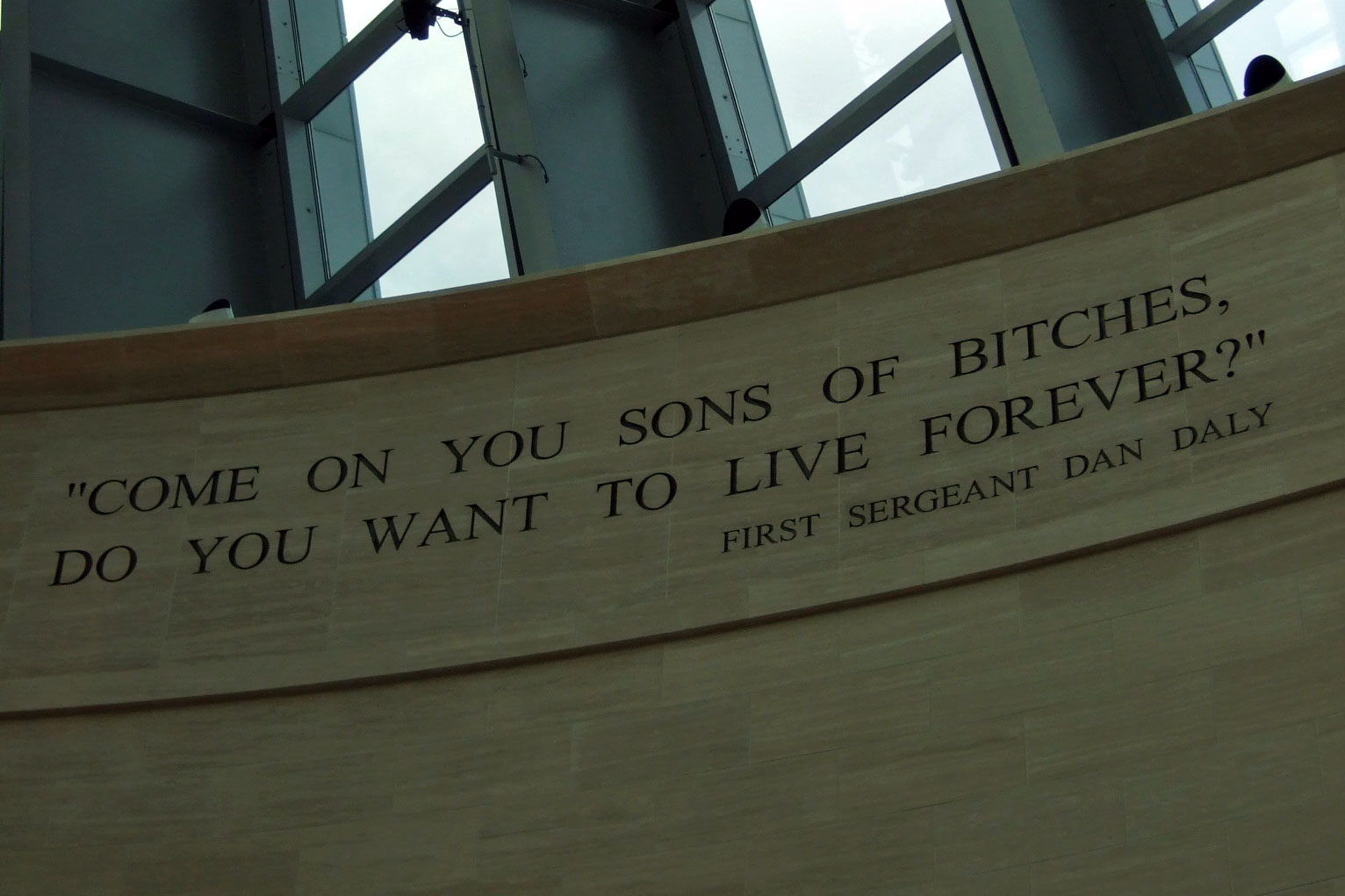
An engraving at the National Museum of the Marine Corps quoting Daniel Daly during a battle in World War I. According to Marine Corp lore, he said "Come on, you sons of bitches, do you want to live forever?" before a charge.

The term's use as an insult is as old as that of bitch. Euphemistic terms are often substituted, such as gun in the phrase "son of a gun" as opposed to "son of a bitch", or "s.o.b." for the same phrase. Like bitch, the severity of the insult has diminished. Roy Blount Jr. in 2008 extolled the virtues of "son of a bitch" (particularly in comparison to "asshole") in common speech and deed. Son of a bitch can also be used as a "how about that" reaction, or as a reaction to excruciating pain.

In politics the phrase "Yes, he is a son of a bitch, but he is our son of a bitch" has been attributed, probably apocryphally, to various U.S. presidents from Franklin D. Roosevelt to Richard Nixon. Immediately after the detonation of the first atomic bomb in Alamogordo, New Mexico, in July 1945 (the device codenamed Gadget), the Manhattan Project scientist who served as the director of the test, Kenneth Bainbridge, exclaimed to Oppenheimer "Now we're all sons-of-bitches."

In January 2022, U.S. president Joe Biden was recorded on a hot mic responding to Fox News correspondent Peter Doocy asking, "Do you think inflation is a political liability ahead of the midterms?" Biden responded sarcastically, saying, "It's a great asset—more inflation. What a stupid son of a bitch."

The 19th-century British racehorse Filho da Puta took its name from "Son of a Bitch" in Portuguese.

The Curtiss SB2C Helldiver, a World War II U.S. Navy dive bomber, was called "Son-of-a-Bitch 2nd Class" by some of its pilots and crewmen.

=== In cards ===
To have the "bitch end" of a hand in poker is to have the weaker version of the same hand as another player. This situation occurs especially in poker games with community cards. For example, to have a lower straight than one's opponent is to have the bitch end.

The bitch is slang for the queen of spades.

== Other forms ==
When used as a verb, to bitch means to complain. Usage in this context is almost always pejorative in intent. As an adjective, the term sometimes has a meaning opposite its usual connotations. Something that is bitching (the bitch) is really great. For example, an admired motorcycle may be praised as a "bitchin' bike".

== See also ==
- Basic bitches
- "Bitch" (Law & Order)
- Bitch (magazine)
- Bitch Wars
- "Bitch" (Meredith Brooks song)
- Bottom bitch
- Momma Dee, who misspelled bitch as bicth.
- Profanity
- Third-wave feminism § Reclaiming derogatory terms
- Saint Clement and Sisinnius inscription – 11th-century Romance and Latin inscription
- Fuck
