= Etiquette & Espionage =

2013 novel by Gail Carriger

- front cover of the 1st U.S. edition
- Author: Gail Carriger
- Language: English
- Series: Finishing School (series)
- Genre: Steampunk, Young adult
- Publisher: Little Brown
- Publication date: February 5, 2013
- Publication place: United States
- Media type: Print (Hardback)
- Pages: 307 pp
- ISBN: 031619008X
- Followed by: Curtsies & Conspiracies

Etiquette & Espionage is a young adult steampunk novel by Gail Carriger. It is her first young adult novel, and is set in the same universe as her bestselling Parasol Protectorate adult series.

== Plot ==
Like the Parasol Protectorate books, Etiquette & Espionage is set in an alternate history version of Victorian era Britain where supernatural creatures such as vampires and werewolves are part of society. The protagonist is 14-year-old Sophronia, who enrolls in Mademoiselle Geraldine's Finishing Academy for Young Ladies of Quality. But Sophronia finds out that this is not an ordinary finishing school; in addition to dance, dress, and etiquette, she and her classmates are also trained in the fine arts of espionage and assassination.

== Reception ==
Etiquette & Espionage was well received. It earned four-starred reviews and hit The New York Times Best Seller list its first week on sale. Kirkus Reviews noted that the book is lighter on romance than is typical in YA, but praises the silliness and genre-blending. Publishers Weekly praised Carriger's ability to weave in commentary about race and class amidst the lighthearted fun of the book. Other reviewers noted that Carriger successfully subverts the "action girl" young adult trope, and that she successfully appeals to both age groups (adults and teens) without talking down to her young adult audience.

== Sequels ==
The Finishing School series consists of four books:

- Etiquette & Espionage (2013)
- Curtsies & Conspiracies (2013)
- Waistcoats & Weaponry (2014)
- Manners & Mutiny (2015)

In 2013, as a promotion for Curtsies & Conspiracies, Carriger released a music video based on the series.
