= Changeless =

Changeless could refer to:

- Changeless (album), a 1988 live album by American pianist Keith Jarrett
- Changeless (novel), a 2010 steampunk novel by American author Gail Carriger
