= Blameless (novel) =

2010 novel by Gail Carriger

- Front cover of the 1st U.S. edition
- Author: Gail Carriger
- Cover artist: Lauren Panepinto
- Language: English
- Series: The Parasol Protectorate
- Genre: Steampunk, paranormal romance
- Publisher: Orbit
- Publication date: September 1, 2010 (1st edition)
- Publication place: United States
- Media type: Print (paperback)
- Pages: 384pp (1st edition)
- ISBN: 0-316-07415-2
- OCLC: 515444365
- Preceded by: Changeless
- Followed by: Heartless

Blameless is a steampunk paranormal romance novel by Gail Carriger. First published on September 1, 2010, by Orbit Books, Blameless is the third book in the five-novel "The Parasol Protectorate" series, each featuring Alexia Tarabotti, a woman without a soul, as its lead character. The book, originally published as a "mass-market" paperback, was a New York Times Best Seller.

== Plot ==
Blending steampunk with urban fantasy, Blameless is set in an alternate history version of Victorian era Britain where vampires and werewolves are welcomed as members of society, often in the upper class. Alexia Tarabotti, the Lady Maccon, leaves her werewolf husband Lord Maccon and moves back in with her family, only to find herself at the center of a scandal when it is discovered that she is pregnant: werewolves are not considered capable of fathering children, and therefore she must be an adulterer. She is dismissed from the Shadow Council by Queen Victoria and her social support structures disintegrate. Meanwhile, the vampire community of London has turned against her. While her estranged husband increasingly turns to drinking to ease his pain, Alexia leaves England for Italy, the birthplace of her late father, to seek out the Templars for answers. Because she is "soulless", and so unaffected by the abilities of supernatural beings, her journey to the truth is more complicated than even she can imagine.

== Publication history ==
- 2010, USA, Orbit Books ISBN 0-316-07415-2, Pub date 1 September 2010, Paperback
- 2010, UK, Orbit Books ISBN 1-84149-973-0, Pub date 2 September 2010, Paperback
- 2011, Germany, Blanvalet ISBN 978-3-442-37651-3, Pub date 19 September 2011, Paperback (in German as Entflammte Nacht ("Ignited Night") translated by Anita Nirschl)

The author's official website also lists an Italian language edition by Baldini & Castoldi, plus a Spanish language edition to be released by Versátil. Each of these translated editions are listed with "unknown" upcoming publication dates. In November 2010, the author announced that Proszynski will publish the novel in Poland but with no announced publication date.

The original US cover for the novel was designed by Lauren Panepinto, Creative Director for Orbit Books and Yen Press. The model portraying heroine Alexia Tarabotti on the US and UK covers is actress Donna Ricci. The original photograph of Ricci for this cover was taken by Tiny Dragon Productions.

== Reception ==
Blameless spent two weeks on the New York Times Best Seller list, peaking at #20 on the Paperback Mass Market Fiction list in the week ending September 5, 2010. The novel slipped to #35, the bottom of the extended list, the following week. The novel topped the Locus magazine mass-market paperback bestseller list in December 2010.

== Adaptations ==
In September 2010, Carriger's literary agent announced that worldwide rights to adapt the first three novels in the Alexia Tarabotti series as graphic novels have been sold to Yen Press. Yen Press, like series publisher Orbit Books, is a division of Hachette Book Group.
