= Phoebe (George Mason University journal) =

- Discipline: literary journal
- Language: English
- Edited by: John Carl Guthrie

Publication details
- History: 1971-present
- Publisher: George Mason University (United States)
- Frequency: Biannual

Standard abbreviations
- ISO 4: Phoebe

Indexing
- ISSN: 0270-868X

Links
- Journal homepage

Phoebe: A Journal of Literature and Art is a literary journal based at George Mason University in Fairfax, Virginia and first published in 1971. It publishes one print issue and one online issue each year in addition to running annual contests in fiction, poetry, and nonfiction. The journal has served as a space for up-and-coming writers, whose style, form, voice, and subject matter demonstrate a vigorous appeal to the senses, intellect, and emotions of readers. According to the Phoebe constitution, "We insist on openness, which means we welcome both experimental and conventional prose and poetry, and we insist on being entertained, which means the work must capture and hold our attention, whether it be the potent language of a poem or the narrative mechanics of a short story."

== Notable contributors ==
Matt Bell (author), Dorothea Lasky, Karen An-hwei Lee, Richard Bausch, Robert Bausch (the Bausch brothers were among the founding staff), Joshua Ferris, Russell Edson, Jenny Boully, Cornelius Eady, Kim Addonizio, Katie Ford, Thomas Lux, Jacob M. Appel, Yusef Komunyakaa, C.K. Williams, Ray DiPalma, Keith Waldrop, Michael Palmer (poet), Cathy Park Hong, G.C. Waldrep, and Rosmarie Waldrop

== Notable judges ==
1997 Winter Contest: Fiction: Susan Shreve, Poetry: Rod Smith (poet)

1998 Winter Contest: Fiction: Cathi Hanauer, Poetry: Russell Edson

2006 Winter Contest: Fiction: Carrie Brown (author), Poetry: Anne Carson

2011 Winter Contest: Nonfiction: Shauna Cross, Fiction: Caitlin Horrocks, Poetry: Dan Beachy-Quick

2014 Winter Contest: Nonfiction: Cheryl Strayed, Fiction: Benjamin Percy, Poetry: Eduardo C. Corral

2015 Winter Contest: Nonfiction: Roxane Gay, Fiction: Ramona Ausubel, Poetry: Brian Teare

== About Phoebe ==
Phoebe supports up-and-coming writers, whose style, form, voice, and subject matter demonstrate a vigorous appeal to the senses, intellect, and emotions of readers. According to the Phoebe website, writers are chosen because the editors believe their work succeeds at its goals, whether its goals are to uphold or challenge literary tradition.

The journal's website also says that, as a whole, the editors insist on openness, which means that both experimental and conventional prose and poetry are welcome. The editors also say that they insist on being entertained, which means the work must capture and hold the reader's attention, whether it be the potent language of a poem or the narrative mechanics of a short story or the subtle, but perfectly phrased capture of a moment of a nonfiction piece.

== See also ==
- List of literary magazines
