= HBI =

HBI may refer to:

- IATA code "HBI" for Asheboro Regional Airport North Carolina, United States
- Hamengkubuwono I (also known as Raden Mas Sujana), first rule or Yogyakarta, Java between 1755 and 1792
- Hanesbrands, an American clothing company
- Hans-Bredow-Institut, in Hamburg, Germany
- Heartless Bitches International, a website
- Horizontal blank interrupt
- Horizontal blanking interval
- Host-based intrusion detection system
- Hot-briquetted iron, a compacted form of direct reduced iron
- Houston Bible Institute, now the College of Biblical Studies, in Houston, Texas, United States
