= Nice guy =

Term in popular psychology

"Nice guy" is an informal term, commonly used with either a literal or a sarcastic meaning, for a man. In the literal sense, the term describes a man who is agreeable, gentle, compassionate, sensitive, and vulnerable. The term is used both positively and negatively. When used positively, and particularly when used as a preference or description by someone else, it is intended to imply a man who puts the needs of others before his own, avoids confrontations, does favors, provides emotional support, tries to stay out of trouble, and generally acts nicely towards others.

In the context of a relationship, it may also refer to traits of honesty, loyalty, romanticism, courtesy, and respect. When used negatively, a nice guy implies a man who is unassertive or otherwise unattractive. The opposite of a genuine "nice guy" is commonly described as a "jerk", a term for a mean, selfish and uncaring person. A man is labeled a "jerk" on how he treats his partner, seen as the extreme case where he would not have a sensitive or kind side and is seen as a "macho man" and insensitive type.

However, the term is also often used sarcastically, particularly in the context of dating, to describe someone who believes himself to possess genuine "nice guy" characteristics, even though he actually does not, and who uses acts of friendship and basic social etiquette with the ulterior aim of progressing to a romantic or sexual relationship. This is sometimes referred to as "nice guy syndrome", which is used to describe a sense of entitlement to sexual or romantic attention from women simply for being "nice," and irrational anger when that attention is not reciprocated. Although the "nice guy syndrome" is used primarily in the context of dating relationships, it can also apply to the workplace as well as politics.

== Research on female preferences ==
=== "Nice guy" construct ===
In their qualitative analysis (1999), Herold and Milhausen found that women associate different qualities with the "nice guy" label:

Some women offered flattering interpretations of the "nice guy", characterizing him as committed, caring, and respectful of women. Some women, however, emphasized more negative aspects, considering the "nice guy" to be boring, lacking confidence, and unattractive.

The "bad boys" were divided into two categories, "as either confident, attractive, sexy, and exciting or as manipulative, unfaithful, disrespectful of women, and interested only in sex".

This distinction helped further the understanding of why women might prefer "nice guys" or "not-nice guys". Women were asked for their preferences and what values they may look for in each relationship, such as attractiveness, and sexual desires in short- and long-term relationships.

Nice guys are sometimes suggested to be overbearing or lacking in vision and ambitions; these opinions suggest self-confidence as a key-point and area of improvement. Often these ideas and views of a certain nice guy can contribute to a woman's willingness to pursue a romantic relationship.

Researchers have therefore operationalized the "nice guy" and "jerk" constructs in different ways, some of which are outlined below.

=== Results of research ===
Various studies explicitly try to elucidate the success, or lack thereof, of "nice guys" with women.

Jensen-Campbell et al. (1995) operationalized "niceness" as prosocial behavior, which included agreeableness and altruism. They found that female attraction was a result of an interaction of both dominance and prosocial tendency. They suggest that altruism may be attractive to women when it is perceived as a form of agentic behavior.

Nice guys are usually seen as twice as attractive as men who present themselves as neutral, and eight times more attractive than the "jerks" in a dating profile. Social dominance enhances female attraction to a male who has shown in the relationship niceness, traits of kindness and warmth stated by women looking for long-term relationships, and less status and physical attractiveness.

Sprecher and Regan (2002) found kindness, warmth, expressiveness, openness, and humor as desirable traits of a long-term partner. Social status indicators, such as future earning potential (wealth), were not viewed as more desirable traits when compared to the previous traits. Participants suggested they wanted more humor, expressiveness and warmth from their partner than is expressed with their friends.

Herold and Milhausen (1999) found that women are more likely to report wanting a nice guy but do not choose them in their real dating life. They also found that women perceived nice guys as having less sexual partners in general but perceived them as more eligible for dating. Women claim to prefer to date people who have less sexual experience. A third of the women, however, had reported dating multiple partners that had had more sexual experience than them. There was a dichotomous relationship between a woman’s perception of what a nice guy is and does and whether or not he "finishes last", as the common adage states. If a woman believes that a nice guy is kind and respectful to women then they will say that he does not finish last. If the nice guy is perceived as being passive or unattractive then they will say that he does finish last.

Urbaniak and Killman (2003) constructed vignettes of four hypothetical dating show contestants: "Nice Todd" vs. "Neutral Todd" vs. "Jerk Todd" vs. "Michael", who was created to be a control. "Nice Todd" described a "real man" as "in touch with his feelings", kind and attentive, non-macho, and interested in putting his partner's pleasure first. "Neutral Todd" described a "real man" as someone who "knows what he wants and knows how to get it", and who is good to the woman he loves. "Jerk Todd" described a "real man" as someone who "knows what he wants and knows how to get it", who keeps everyone else on their toes, and avoids "touch-feely" stuff. "Michael" described a "real man" as relaxed and positive.

In two studies, Urbaniak and Kilmann found that women claimed to prefer "Nice Todd" over "Neutral Todd" and "Jerk Todd", relative to "Michael" even at differing levels of physical attractiveness. They found that for purely sexual relationships, "niceness appeared relatively less influential than physical attractiveness". After acknowledging that women's preference for "niceness" could be inflated by the social desirability bias, especially due to their use of verbal scripts, they conclude that "our overall results did not favor the nice guy stereotype; instead, our results suggested that women’s attitudes (as expressed in previous studies) do, in fact, generally match their behaviors. Niceness was a robust, positive factor in women’s choices of a dating partner and in how desirable they rated Todd."

McDaniel (2005) constructed vignettes of dates with a stereotypical "nice guy" vs. a stereotypical "fun/sexy guy", and attempted to make them both sound positive. Questionnaires were offered to a group of women in which they were presented with two scenarios, one involving the nice guy and the other involving the fun/sexy guy. The two variables being measured were the women’s likelihood of picking a nice guy versus a fun/sexy guy, and their reasons for so doing. It was found that there was a stronger correlation between a woman’s perceived positive traits in the man than in her goals for the dating relationship, both of which were measured in the questionnaire.

The two traits that predicted likelihood for wanting to pursue a relationship were physical attractiveness and niceness/sweetness. However, if a man was perceived to be nice/sweet, but was not found physically attractive, it hurt his chances of a romantic relationship even more. In the study there was no way to directly measure the physical attractiveness of the men with whom they were presented. They only had information with which they could draw conclusions. Because they could not see the men and only had information to use, McDaniel found that this may suggest that women romanticize the idea of a nice/sweet guy, but often do not choose him because in reality he is likely to be less attractive than a so-called "jerk".

A 2008 study at New Mexico State University in Las Cruces showed that "nice guys" report having significantly fewer sexual partners than "bad boys".

Barclay (2010) found that when all other factors are held constant, guys who perform generous acts are rated as more desirable for dates and long-term relationships than non-generous guys. This study used a series of matched descriptions where each male was presented in a generous or a control version which differed only in whether the man tended to help others. The author suggests that niceness itself is desirable to women, but tends to be used by men who are less attractive in other domains, and this is what creates the appearance that "nice guys finish last".

Judge et al. (2011) concluded that

Nice guys do not necessarily finish last, but they do finish a distant second in terms of earnings ... yet, seen from the perspective of gender equity, even the nice guys seem to be making out quite well relative to either agreeable or disagreeable women.

Sadalla, Kenrick, and Vershure (1985) found that women were sexually attracted to dominance in men, though dominance did not make men likable to women. Dominance in women had no effect on men. This may further suggest that the nice guy myth is one of sexual preference, and not of dating preference. Women appear in practically all studies to be accepting of romantic relationships with nice guys, but are less likely to consider them casual sexual partners.

Bogaert and Fisher (1995) studied the relationships between the personalities of university men and their number of sexual partners. They found a correlation between a man's number of sexual partners, and the traits of sensation-seeking, hypermasculinity, physical attractiveness, and testosterone levels. They discovered a correlation between maximum monthly number of partners, and the traits of dominance and psychoticism. Bogaert and Fisher suggest that an underlying construct labelled "disinhibition" could be used to explain most of these differences. They suggest that disinhibition would correlate negatively with "agreeableness" and "conscientiousness" from the Big Five personality model.

Botwin, Buss and Shackelford (1997) found that women had a higher preference for surgency and dominance in their mates than men did, in a study of dating couples and newlyweds.

Ahmetoglu and Swami (2012) found that men were rated to be more attractive if women perceived them as more dominant, represented in the study by open body posture and gesticulation.

== Other viewpoints ==
=== The "nice guys finish last" view ===
A common aphorism is that "nice guys finish last". The phrase is based on a quote by Brooklyn Dodgers manager Leo Durocher in 1946, which was then condensed by journalists.

The original quote by Durocher was:

The nice guys are all over there, in seventh place.

— (6 July 1946)

It was referring to the 1946 New York Giants, who were the Dodger's rivals. The seventh place that Durocher was referring to was actually second-to-last place in the National League.

Many variants appear in later works, including Durocher's autobiography, Nice Guys Finish Last. The Giants finished the 1946 season in the National League cellar, while Durocher's Dodgers obtained second place.

Simplistically, the term "nice guy" could be an adjectival phrase describing what appears to be a friendly, kind, or courteous man. The "nice guys finish last" phrase is also said to be coined by American biologist Garrett Hardin, to sum up the selfish gene theory of life and evolution. This was disputed by Richard Dawkins, who wrote the book The Selfish Gene. Dawkins was misinterpreted by many as confirming the "nice guy finishing last" view, but refuted the claims in the BBC documentary Nice Guys Finish First.

According to McDaniel in 2005, popular culture and dating advice "suggest that women claim they want a 'nice guy' because they believe that is what is expected of them when, in reality, they want the so-called 'challenge' that comes with dating a not-so-nice guy".

In 2003, following two studies of 48 and 194 women, Urbaniak & Kilmann wrote:

Although women often portray themselves as wanting to date kind, sensitive, and emotionally expressive men, the nice guy stereotype contends that, when actually presented with a choice between such a "nice guy" and an unkind, insensitive, emotionally-closed, "macho man" or "jerk", they invariably reject the nice guy in favor of his "so-called" macho competitor.

Herold and Milhausen found in a 1999 study of 165 university women that 56% claimed to agree with the statement

You may have heard the expression, "Nice guys finish last." In terms of dating, and sex, do you think women are less likely to have sex with men who are "nice" than men who are "not nice"?

The study also found that "while 'nice guys' may not be competitive in terms of numbers of sexual partners, they tend to be more successful with respect to longer-term, committed relationships." The authors posit that the preferences of women for different types of men are linked to their sociosexual orientation.

=== "Nice guy" syndrome ===
The terms nice guy and nice guy syndrome may refer to a male who sees himself as a nice guy. Onlookers may perceive his acts of kindness, however, as motivated by self interest, for example a desire to court women. The nice guy may hope to form a romantic relationship; he may seek sex.

Sexually uninterested or romantically indifferent suitors may place the nice guy in the "friend zone".

More male orientated interpretations claim that the resentment is down to the fact that society, and the vast majority of people in spoken conversation, claim to be attracted to traits such as honesty, integrity and kindness, when in reality more superficial considerations trigger attraction. According to this interpretation, people who display wealth, good looks, dominance, and confidence tend to succeed more in romance than do "nice guys". Nice guys are therefore resentful at the inconsistency between what people claim to be attracted to and by how they act in reality. At times, these men are also known by the term "white knight".

In early 2002, the web site Heartless Bitches International (HBI) published several "rants" on the concept of the nice guy. The central theme was that a genuinely nice male is desirable, but that many nice guys are insecure men unwilling to articulate their romantic or sexual feelings directly.

According to journalist Paris Martineau, in 2018, the incel and red pill movements, part of the anti-feminist manosphere, recruit depressed, frustrated men – who may suffer from "nice guy syndrome" – into the alt-right.

== See also ==
- Popular science
- Bullying
- Mobbing
- Victim blaming
- Gaslighting
- Hybristophilia
- Banality of evil
- Little Eichmanns
- Moral disengagement
- Might makes right
- Social Darwinism
- Alpha and beta male
- Ben Franklin effect
- Extraversion and introversion
- Herbivore men
- Neckbeard (slang)
- Nerd
- Nice Jewish boy
- Simp
- Friend zone
- Forced seduction
- Negging
- Token resistance
- Door-in-the-face technique
- Wolf in sheep's clothing
- Self-Made Man (book)
