= Changeless (novel) =

2010 novel by Gail Carriger

- Front cover of the 1st U.S. edition
- Author: Gail Carriger
- Cover artist: Lauren Panepinto
- Language: English
- Series: The Parasol Protectorate
- Genre: Steampunk, paranormal romance
- Publisher: Orbit
- Publication date: April 1, 2010 (1st edition)
- Publication place: United States
- Media type: Print (paperback)
- Pages: 400pp (1st edition)
- ISBN: 0-316-07414-4
- OCLC: 449868635
- Preceded by: Soulless
- Followed by: Blameless

Changeless is a steampunk paranormal romance novel by Gail Carriger. First published in the United States on April 1, 2010 by Orbit Books, Changeless is the second book in the five-novel "The Parasol Protectorate" series, each featuring Alexia Tarabotti, a woman without a soul, as its lead character. The book, originally published as a "mass-market" paperback, was a New York Times Best Seller.

== Plot ==
Changeless is set in an alternate history version of Victorian era Britain where werewolves and vampires are accepted as functioning members of society. Alexia Tarabotti still has no soul but she does now have a husband. Now known as Lady Maccon, Alexia finds her werewolf husband in distress. His sudden disappearance entangles her with a regiment of supernatural soldiers, a group of exorcised ghosts, and Queen Victoria herself. Alexia uses her sharp tongue, keen mind, and her trusty parasol in her effort to solve the problems put before her and to locate Lord Maccon. Her search takes her to Scotland and a werewolf pack where the fact that she is "soulless", and thus unaffected by the powers of supernatural beings, can make all the difference.

== Publication history ==
- 2010, USA, Orbit Books ISBN 0-316-07414-4, Pub date 1 April 2010, Paperback
- 2010, UK, Orbit Books ISBN 1-84149-974-9, Pub date 2 September 2010, Paperback
- 2011, Germany, Blanvalet ISBN 978-3-442-37650-6, Pub date 18 July 2011, Paperback (in German as Brennende Finsternis ("Burning Darkness") translated by Anita Nirschl)

The author's official website also lists a French language edition by Orbit France/Calmann Levy, a Spanish language edition to be released by Versátil, plus an Italian language edition by Baldini & Castoldi, all with "unknown" upcoming publication dates. In November 2010, the author announced that Proszynski will publish the novel in Poland and Hayakawa will publish it in Japan, neither with announced publication dates.

The original US cover for the novel was designed by Lauren Panepinto, Creative Director for Orbit Books and Yen Press. The model portraying heroine Alexia Tarabotti on the US cover is actress Donna Ricci. The original photograph of Ricci for this cover was taken by Derek Caballero.

== Reception ==
Changeless spent two weeks on the New York Times Best Seller list, peaking at #20 on the Paperback Mass Market Fiction list in the week ending April 3, 2010.

== Adaptations ==
In September 2010, Carriger's literary agent announced that worldwide rights to adapt the first three novels in the Alexia Tarabotti series as graphic novels have been sold to Yen Press. Yen Press, like series publisher Orbit Books, is a division of Hachette Book Group.
