= BitchSlut =

2016 song

Single by Anna Wise

from the EP The Feminine: Act I
- Released: March 7, 2016
- Genre: Pop rap
- Length: 2:26
- Label: N/A
- Songwriter: Anna Wise
- Producers: Daddy Kev; B. Lewis; Christian McBride; Zeke Mishanec; Dane Orr; Anna Wise

Anna Wise singles chronology
"Precious Possession" (2016)	"BitchSlut" (2016)	"Coconuts" (2017)

Music video
- "BitchSlut" on YouTube

"BitchSlut" is a song by the American singer Anna Wise. It was released as her second single on March 7, 2016 (the day before International Women's Day), and appears on her debut EP The Feminine: Act I. The song (which has a music video) is a feminist anthem inspired by an experience Wise had with sexual harassment in her youth. "BitchSlut" appeared on some best-of lists and was preceded by the single "Precious Possession" and followed by the single "Coconuts".

== Background and content ==
According to Wise, the inspiration for the song stems from an altercation she had when she was eleven years old. A car of older men approached her and verbally sexually harassed her, which she responded to by giving the finger. She later cried; Wise dedicates "BitchSlut" to her younger self.

"BitchSlut" is a feminist anthem about sexism. She opens the song with a line HuffPost described as a "powerful (and entirely accurate)" message about women feeling underpowered. The track then takes the form of a list of stereotypes, with Wise criticizing each one. The song's production has been described as "infectious" and "post-Dilla", with "floating synths and booming drum breaks". Some journalists consider the vocals to be part rap, part singing, and their style to be jagged and glossy.

Wise described the track as a "clear ... declaration of freedom" about the double standards she believes men expect of women, with the chorus "I, I know what kind you are / If I say no, I’m a bitch / Say yes, I’m a slut" manifesting this meaning. The refrain transition has been compared to the style of the American rock band Dirty Projectors. She also said that she wanted to talk about herself because of her gender, calling it "kind of selfish". The song takes part in the feminist discussion of altering the contexts of the insults bitch and slut to positively reappropriate them.

== Critical reception ==
Tess Koman of Cosmopolitan called "BitchSlut" "lovely, uplifting, [and] head-bopping". Paul Demerritt of Creative Loafing believed the single was "standout" on its EP. Teresa Jusino of The Mary Sue noted the single's replayability, saying it "will be the next track you can't stop listening to". Jenavieve Hatch of HuffPost hoped it would become the song of the summer, with Spin calling the song's refrain the "most casually patriarchy-dismantling" of 2016.

"BitchSlut" was listed as one of the best songs of the week by Stereogum and Consequence. It also made year-end lists, including Shawn Setaro of Complex's ten favorite songs of the year and "The 50 Best Protest Songs of 2016" by The Village Voice.

== Music video ==
The song was released alongside a homemade music video, in which Wise features as the lone actor, wearing sunglasses. Throughout the video, she appears in various settings, including a bedroom, in a swimming pool, in a bathtub, and in the outdoors. The video was directed by Wise and filmed by Patti Miller.
