= Gail Carriger =

American archaeologist (as Borregaard) and fiction writer

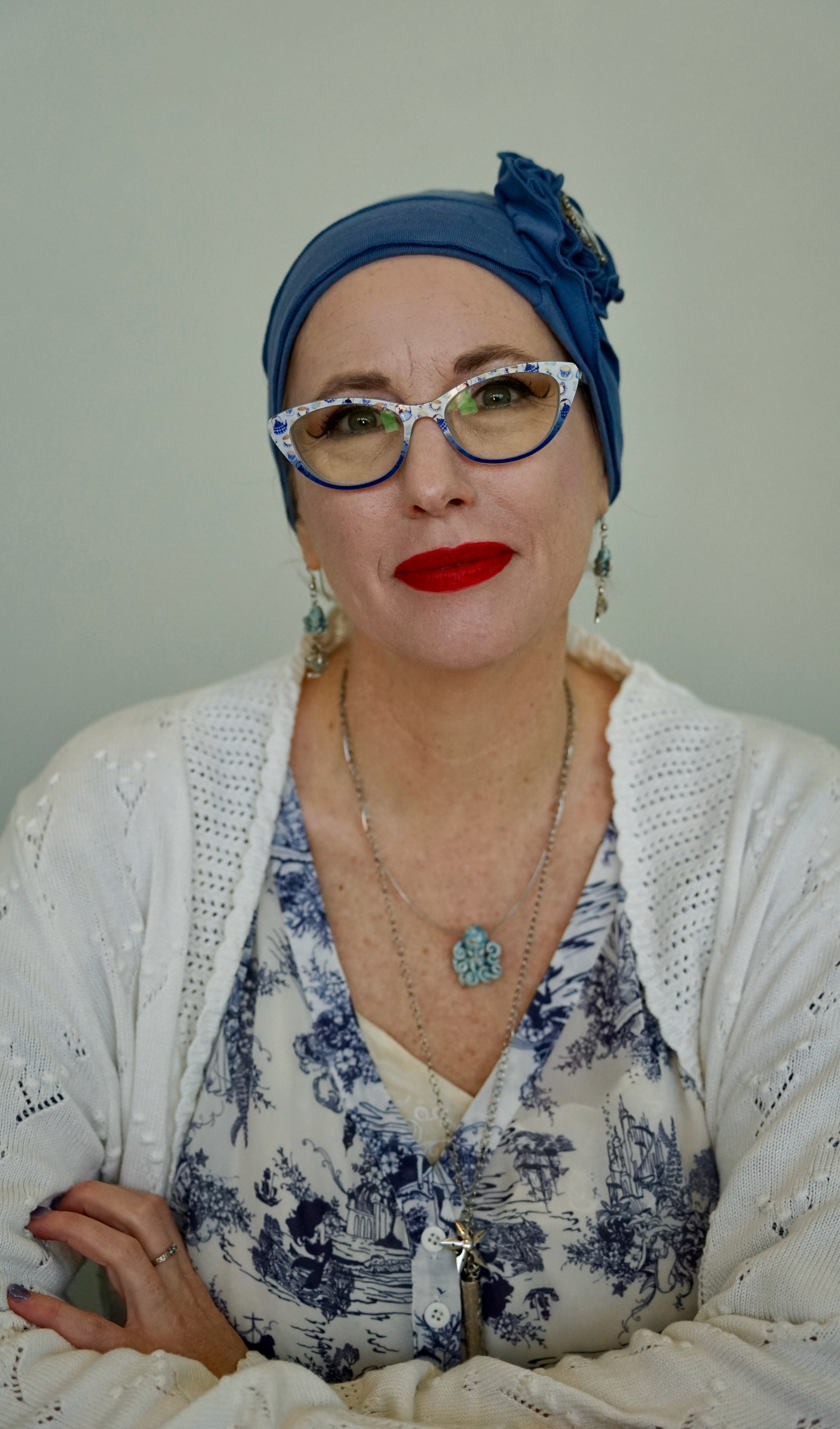
- Carriger at Worldcon 2026
- Born: May 4, 1976 (age 50); Bolinas, California, U.S.
- Occupation: Writer
- Writing career
- Pen name: Gail Carriger
- Period: 2009 to present
- Genres: Steampunk, paranormal romance, urban fantasy, mystery, science fiction
- Website: gailcarriger.com

Gail Carriger (born May 4, 1976) is an American archaeologist and author of steampunk fiction. She was born in Bolinas, an unincorporated community in Marin County, California, and attended high school at Marin Academy. She received her undergraduate degree from Oberlin College, a masters of science in archaeological materials at England's University of Nottingham in 2000, and a master of arts in anthropology (with a focus on archaeology) at the University of California Santa Cruz in 2008. She is a 2010 recipient of the Alex Awards.

== Novels ==
Carriger's first novel, Soulless, was published in 2009 by Orbit Books and earned her a nomination for the John W. Campbell Award for Best New Writer. The book was a Compton Crook Award nominee, a Locus Award finalist for Best First Novel, and Locus placed her on their recommended reading list. Her second novel, Changeless, was published in early 2010 and earned her a place on the New York Times Bestseller List. Her third novel, Blameless, was released in September 2010 and also became a New York Times bestseller. The five-book series continued with Heartless in late June 2011 and concluded with Timeless in March 2012. Carriger was the guest of honor at FenCon, a science fiction convention in Dallas, Texas, in September 2011. Carriger lists "P. G. Wodehouse, Austen, Dickens, and Victorian travel journals" as influences on her writing.

Carriger's series for young adults, the four-book Finishing School series, launched with Etiquette & Espionage in February 2013 and was an instant New York Times bestseller. The Finishing School series takes place in the same world as the Parasol Protectorate series, featuring an earlier generation of characters. Book two in the Finishing School series, Curtsies & Conspiracies, was released in November 2013. In July 2012, final cover art and synopsis for Etiquette & Espionage were revealed along with the announcement of an additional series set in the Parasol Protectorate world, titled The Custard Protocol. The first novel in the Custard Protocol series was called Prudence, followed by Imprudence, Competence, and Reticence. The Supernatural Society and Delightfully Deadly novellas are also set in the Parasolverse.

Carriger's paranormal romance series, The San Andreas Shifters, written under the name G.L. Carriger, launched in 2017 with The Sumage Solution. The series is based on her previously published short story, Marine Biology, and is set in her home county of Marin, California.

Carriger also has a science fiction universe, the Tinkered Stars, which began with YA space adventure story Crudrat. Begun as a Kickstarter, Crudrat was first published as a full cast audio in 2014, and then reissued in print in 2022. The second book in the universe is sci fi cozy mystery, The 5th Gender, was published in 2019 and written under the G.L. Carriger name. She also has a YA space opera trilogy in this universe, the Tinkered Starsong series, which launched with the book Divinity 36, first published in 2023.

== Bibliography ==
=== Parasol Protectorate ===
- Soulless (2009) USA, Orbit Books ISBN 0-316-05663-4, Pub date October 7, 2009, Paperback
- Changeless (2010) USA, Orbit Books ISBN 0-316-07414-4, Pub date April 1, 2010, Paperback
- Blameless (2010) USA, Orbit Books ISBN 0-316-07415-2, Pub date September 1, 2010, Paperback
- Heartless (2011) USA, Orbit Books ISBN 0-316-12719-1, Pub date June 28, 2011, Paperback
- Timeless (2012) USA, Orbit Books, ISBN 0-316-12718-3, Pub date February 28, 2012, Paperback
- Meat Cute (short story) (2019), ebook only

=== Supernatural Society novellas ===
- Romancing the Inventor, Gail Carriger LLC, ISBN 9781944751067, Pub date 1 November 2016, paperback / eBook.
- Romancing the Werewolf, Gail Carriger LLC, ISBN 9781944751104, Pub date 5 November 2017, paperback / eBook.
- Dear Lord Akeldama and Parasolverse Ephemera (2024)

=== Parasol Protectorate (manga) ===
- Soulless: The Manga, Vol. 1 (2012) USA, Yen Press ISBN 0-316-18201-X, Pub date March 1, 2012, Paperback based on Soulless
- Soulless: The Manga, Vol. 2 (2012) USA, Yen Press ISBN 0-316-18206-0, Pub date November 20, 2012, Paperback, based on Changeless
- Soulless: The Manga, Vol. 3 (2013) USA, Yen Press Pub date November 19, 2013, Paperback, based on Blameless

=== Finishing School ===
- Etiquette & Espionage (2013) USA, Little, Brown Books for Young Readers ISBN 0-316-19008-X
- Curtsies & Conspiracies (November 5, 2013) USA, Little, Brown Books for Young Readers ISBN 978-1907411601
- Waistcoats & Weaponry (November 4, 2014) ISBN 9780316190275
- Manners & Mutiny (November 3, 2015) ISBN 9780316190282

=== Delightfully Deadly novellas ===
- Poison or Protect, Gail Carriger LLC, ISBN 978-1944751043, Pub date 21 June 2016, paperback / eBook
- Defy or Defend, Gail Carriger, ISBN 9781944751432, Pub date 3 May 2020, paperback/eBook
- Ambush or Adore, Gail Carriger, Pub date 27 June 2022, paperback / eBook

=== The Custard Protocol ===
- Prudence (2015)
- Imprudence (2016)
- Competence (2018)
- Reticence (6 Aug 2019)

=== Claw and Courtship ===
- How to Marry a Werewolf, ISBN 9781944751272, Pub date 13 April 2020, paperback/eBook

=== San Andreas Shifters ===
- Marine Biology (2010) novella in The Mammoth Book of Paranormal Romance 2
- The Sumage Solution (2017)
- The Omega Objection (2018)
- The Enforcer Enigma (1 August 2020)
- Vixen Ecology (13 January 2021) short story ebook only
- The Dratsie Dilemma (1 December 2024)

=== The Tinkered Stars Universe ===
- Crudrat (Full cast audio 2014 with Artistic Whispers Productions and Gail Carriger, ebook/paperback release 2022)
- The Fifth Gender (2019)
- Divinity 36 (2023) Book 1 of The Tinkered Starsong Trilogy
- Demigod 12 (2023) Book 2 of The Tinkered Starsong Trilogy
- Dome 6 (2023) Book 3 of The Tinkered Starsong Trilogy

=== Short fiction ===
- My Sister's Song (2011)
- Marine Biology (2010) in The Mammoth Book of Paranormal Romance 2
- Fairy Debt (2013)
- The Curious Case of the Werewolf that Wasn't, The Mummy that Was and the Cat in the Jar (2013) The Book of the Dead

=== Other ===
- Which Is Mightier, the Pen or the Parasol? article (2010) Steampunk II: Steampunk Reloaded
- The Heroine's Journey, non-fiction, ISBN 9781944751340, Pub date 25 Aug 2020

== Cultural references ==
- Deathless is a 21-player Live action role-playing game run at Phenomenon Role-playing Convention during 2017 in Canberra, Australia, based on Gail Carriger's Parasol Protectorate series.
- The Curious Case of the Corpsified Contact is a 5-player Live action role-playing game run at Phenomenon Role-playing Convention during 2019 in Canberra, Australia, based on Gail Carriger's Parasol Protectorate series.

== Other sources ==
- "Gail Carriger: Remember to Behave". Locus. September 16, 2010.
- Burnham, Karen (February 11, 2010). "REVIEW: Soulless by Gail Carriger". SF Signal.
- Bedford, Rob H. (September 21, 2009). "Soulless by Gail Carriger". SFF World. Archived from the original on August 3, 2010.
- "YALSA's Alex Awards". American Library Association. Archived from the original on May 31, 2010.
- Panepinto, Lauren (March 8, 2010). ""Blameless", or "How To Design A Cover in 1:55 seconds"". Orbit Books.
- "News". Nelson Literary Agency. Archived from the original on November 3, 2010. "JUST SOLD: Graphic novel rights to the first three books in NYT bestselling author Gail Carriger's Alexia Tarabotti series: Soulless, Changeless, and Blameless, to Kurt Hassler at Yen Press by Kristin Nelson at Nelson Literary Agency."
