= Timeless (Carriger novel) =

2012 novel by Gail Carriger

- U.S. first edition cover
- Author: Gail Carriger
- Cover artist: Lauren Panepinto
- Language: English
- Series: The Parasol Protectorate
- Genre: Steampunk, Paranormal romance
- Publisher: Orbit
- Publication date: 28 February 2012 (1st edition)
- Publication place: United States
- Media type: Print (Paperback)
- Pages: 416pp (1st edition)
- ISBN: 0-316-12718-3
- Preceded by: Heartless

Timeless is a steampunk paranormal romance novel by Gail Carriger. Released on February 28, 2012, by Orbit Books, Timeless is the fifth and final book in the New York Times best-selling "The Parasol Protectorate" series, each featuring Alexia Tarabotti, a woman without a soul, as its lead character.

== Plot ==
Blending steampunk with urban fantasy, Timeless is set in an alternate history version of Victorian era Britain where vampires and werewolfs are welcomed as members of society, often in the upper class. The protagonist of the novel is Alexia Tarabotti, the Lady Maccon, who is "soulless", and thus unaffected by the powers of supernatural beings.

Alexia and her husband, an alpha werewolf, raise their young daughter, who occasionally transforms. Alexia is later summoned to Alexandria to face the ancient vampire queen, drawing her family and associates in London, Scotland, and Egypt into the investigation of the God-Breaker Plague.

== Publication history ==
- 2012, USA, Orbit Books ISBN 0-316-12718-3, Pub date 28 February 2012, Paperback
- 2012, UK, Orbit Books ISBN 1-84149-987-0, Pub date 1 March 2012, Paperback

As with the first four novels in the series, this cover was designed by Lauren Panepinto and the model on the cover is Donna Ricci. The original photographs of Ricci for this cover were taken by Pixie Vision Productions.

While the author's official website lists French, German, and Thai translated editions of this novel to be released in the near future, no specific publication dates have yet been announced for any non-English language editions of Timeless.
