= Soulless (novel) =

2009 novel by Gail Carriger

- Front cover of the 1st U.S. edition
- Author: Gail Carriger
- Cover artist: Lauren Panepinto
- Language: English
- Series: The Parasol Protectorate
- Genre: Steampunk, Paranormal romance
- Publisher: Orbit
- Publication date: October 1, 2009 (1st edition)
- Publication place: United States
- Media type: Print (Paperback)
- Pages: 384pp (1st edition)
- ISBN: 0-316-05663-4
- OCLC: 318879279
- Followed by: Changeless

Soulless is a steampunk paranormal romance novel by Gail Carriger. First published in the United States on October 1, 2009 by Orbit Books, Soulless is the first book in the five-novel "The Parasol Protectorate" series, each featuring Alexia Tarabotti, a woman without a soul, as its lead character. A finalist for several literary awards and a recipient of the 2010 Alex Award, Soulless was declared by Publishers Weekly to be one of the "Best Books of 2009". An original English-language manga adaptation of the first three volumes of the novel was published by Yen Press in July 2011.

== Plot ==
Soulless is set in an alternate history version of Victorian era Britain where werewolves and vampires are accepted as functioning members of society. Alexia Tarabotti is a woman with several critical problems: she is still searching for a husband, her late Italian father complicates her social standing in a rigid class system, and she has no soul. The fact that she is "soulless" leaves her unaffected by the powers of supernatural beings which only further complicates her life when she accidentally kills a vampire that had attacked her. Queen Victoria sends an investigator, Lord Maccon, who is himself a werewolf. As disappearances in the vampire population of London's high society increase, Alexia becomes the prime suspect. She must solve the mystery, all while maintaining proper decorum and a delicate social balance.

== Characters ==
- Alexia Tarabotti: The main character; she is a spinster, born to an Italian father, Alessandro Tarabotti, and a British mother. She has inherited the unusual condition of being a 'soulless' or 'preternatural'. This enables her to turn supernatural beings "human" as long as she is touching them. She is adept in the art of parasol combat.
- Lord Conall Maccon: Earl of Woolsey and member of the B.U.R. (the Bureau of Unnatural Registry - which keeps tabs on vampires and werewolves in society); a werewolf, Alpha of his pack, who has feelings for Alexia.
- Professor Randolph Lyall : Conall's beta and friend, also a werewolf.
- Ivy Hisselpenny: Alexia's best friend.
- Lord Akeldama: an old and flamboyant vampire, Alexia's friend.
- Mr. MacDougall: an American scientist researching the soul; he had a crush on Alexia.
- Mr. Siemons: head of the Hypocras Club, a scientist who will stop at nothing to eradicate the supernaturals.
- Squire Loontwill: Alexia's step-father.
- Ormond Tunstell: claviger to Lord Maccon.
- Countess Nadasdy: queen vampire of the Westminster Hive.
- Lord Ambrose: member of the Westminster Hive.
- Dr. Neebs: scientist at the Hypocras Club.
- Dr. Caedes: vampire in Countess Nadasdy's Hive.
- Lady Loontwill: Alexia's strict mother; has two daughters with her current husband.
- Evylin Loontwill: Alexia's younger half-sister.
- Felicity Loontwill: Alexia's half-sister.
- Mr. Haverbink: member of B.U.R. assigned to protect Alexia.
- Floote: butler to the Loontwills.
- Biffy: one of Lord Akeldama's drones.
- Mabel Dair: actress and one of Countess Nadasdy's drones.
- George Greemes: Canterbury B.U.R. office agent.

== Publication history ==
- 2009, USA, Orbit Books ISBN 0-316-05663-4, Pub date 7 October 2009, Paperback
- 2010, UK, Orbit Books ISBN 1-84149-972-2, Pub date 2 September 2010, Paperback
- 2010, Spain, Versátil Ediciones ISBN 978-84-92929-24-5, Pub date 2 November 2010, Paperback (in Spanish as Sin Alma)
- 2011, France, Orbit France/Calmann Levy ISBN 978-2-36051-026-9, Pub date 12 January 2011, Paperback (in French as Sans Âme)
- 2011, Japan, Hayakawa Publishing Corporation ISBN 978-4-15-020532-4, Pub date 8 April 2011, Bunkobon （in Japanese as アレクシア女史、倫敦で吸血鬼と戦う (Miss. Alexia fights against vampire in London) translated by Yasuko Kawano）
- 2011, Germany, Blanvalet ISBN 978-3-442-37649-0, Pub date 16 May 2011, Paperback (in German as Glühende Dunkelheit ("Glowing Darkness") translated by Anita Nirschl)

The author's official website also lists a Hungarian language edition by Könyvmolyképző and an Italian language edition by Baldini & Castoldi with "unknown" publication dates. In November 2010, the author announced that Proszynski will publish the novel in Poland and Hayakawa will publish it in Japan, neither with announced publication dates.

The original US cover for the novel was designed by Lauren Panepinto, Creative Director for Orbit Books and Yen Press. The model portraying heroine Alexia Tarabotti on the US, UK, Spanish, and French covers is actress Donna Ricci. The original photograph of Ricci for this cover was taken by Derek Caballero. A different model appears on the German edition of the novel.

== Reception ==
In their August 2009 starred review, Publishers Weekly said of Soulless that "Carriger debuts brilliantly with a blend of Victorian romance, screwball comedy of manners and alternate history." Her "[w]ell-drawn secondary characters round out the story" and that "[t]his intoxicatingly witty parody will appeal to a wide cross-section of romance, fantasy and steampunk fans." Karen Burnham of SF Signal reviewed the novel as "rather more fun than the sum of its parts" which "add up to a very fast, very fun romp of a novel". Rob H. Bedford reviewed Soulless for SFF World noting "Carriger does an impressive job of drawing the reader into the story immediately" but found it "a frustrating read" due to "the repetitive aspects of the novel".

== Awards and nominations ==
The book was a Compton Crook Award nominee for the best first novel of the year in the fields of science fiction, fantasy, or horror fiction; a Locus Award finalist for Best First Novel; and Locus placed her on their recommended reading list. Soulless was one of just ten novels to receive the 2010 Alex Award from the American Library Association as a book written for adults that has a "special appeal" to young adults. Publishers Weekly placed the book on their "Best Books of 2009" list, one of just five mass-market books to make the cut. The novel, Carriger's first, earned her a nomination for the John W. Campbell Award for Best New Writer. The cover of the novel was awarded second place in the Mass Market Cover competition at the New York Book Show by the Bookbinders Guild of New York. Audible.com named the Soulless audiobook narrated by Emily Gray as one of the Best of 2010 in the "Sci-Fi & Fantasy" category.

== Adaptations ==
In June 2010, an audiobook version of the unabridged text of Soulless, as narrated by Emily Gray, was released by Audible.com. In September 2010, Carriger's literary agent announced that worldwide rights to adapt the first three novels in the Alexia Tarabotti series as graphic novels have been sold to Yen Press. Yen Press, like series publisher Orbit Books, is a division of Hachette Book Group. The serialized Yen Press original English-language manga adaptation of Soulless debuted in the July 2011 edition of Yen Plus magazine. The first volume was released March 2012 and debuted second in the New York Times Manga Best Seller List. In 2012, Carriger announced that the Parasol Protectorate series had been optioned for television by a small film company in Ireland.
