= Token resistance =

Token resistance is a term, commonly referred to in gender studies, denoting a rejection of advances, almost always of the sexual kind, with intention of actually engaging in the activity that was initially rejected.

== Scientific validity ==
One study has refuted the stereotype that most women engage in token resistance to sex, with results indicating that perhaps only a very small fraction of women and men have ever engaged in token resistance based on the definition stated within the study.

The same study asserts that both men and women can engage in token resistance, further challenging popular stereotypes.
