= Heartless (Carriger novel) =

2011 novel by Gail Carriger

- U.S. first edition cover
- Author: Gail Carriger
- Cover artist: Lauren Panepinto
- Language: English
- Series: The Parasol Protectorate
- Genre: Steampunk, Paranormal romance
- Publisher: Orbit
- Publication date: June 28, 2011 (1st edition)
- Publication place: United States
- Media type: Print (Paperback)
- Pages: 400pp (1st edition)
- ISBN: 0-316-12719-1
- OCLC: 692290838
- Preceded by: Blameless
- Followed by: Timeless

Heartless is a steampunk paranormal romance novel by Gail Carriger. Released on June 28, 2011, by Orbit Books, Heartless is the fourth book in the New York Times best-selling "The Parasol Protectorate" series, each featuring Alexia Tarabotti, a woman without a soul, as its lead character.

== Plot ==
Blending steampunk with urban fantasy, Heartless is set in an alternate history version of Victorian era Britain where vampires and werewolfs are welcomed as members of society, often in the upper class. The protagonist of the novel is Alexia Tarabotti, the Lady Maccon, who is "soulless", and thus unaffected by the powers of supernatural beings. The author has stated in interviews that while Changeless and Blameless, the second and third books in the series, were closely linked, Heartless will be more independent, in the manner of Soulless, the series' first entry.

Alexia is now eight months pregnant, but that will not stand in the way of her duties to her country and her pack. When a mad ghost threatens Queen Victoria, Alexia must determine who is trying to assassinate the monarch before it is too late. Her handsome husband is once again by her side, even as her quest delves into his murky past. To make matters worse, her sister Felicity has become a suffragette, something odd has taken up residence in Lord Akeldama's second best closet, and London is suffering a plague of zombie porcupines.

== Publication history ==
- 2011, USA, Orbit Books ISBN 0-316-12719-1, Pub date 28 June 2011, Paperback
- 2011, UK, Orbit Books ISBN 0-356-50009-8, Pub date 7 July 2011, Paperback

On September 22, 2010, the author reported that the manuscript was "99% complete" and that the final draft of the novel was due to the publisher on November 1, 2010. Publisher Orbit Books released the book's cover on February 1, 2011, and a revised version in late March 2011. As with the first three novels in the series, this cover was designed by Lauren Panepinto and the model on the cover is Donna Ricci. The original photographs of Ricci for this cover were taken by Pixie Vision Productions.

While the author's official website also lists German, Italian, Spanish, and other translated editions of the first three novels in the series to be released in the near future, no publication dates have yet been announced for any non-English language editions of Heartless.

== Reception ==
In their May 2011 review, Publishers Weekly said of Heartless that "Carriger's writing remains crisp and witty, and the affectionate banter between Lord and Lady Maccon will please series fans distressed by their long separation in 2010's Blameless."

The book debuted on the New York Times best-seller list at #11 for the week ending July 2, 2011. Heartless debuted at #12 on the Publishers Weekly best-seller list for mass market paperbacks.
