= Charlotte Link =

German writer (born 1963)

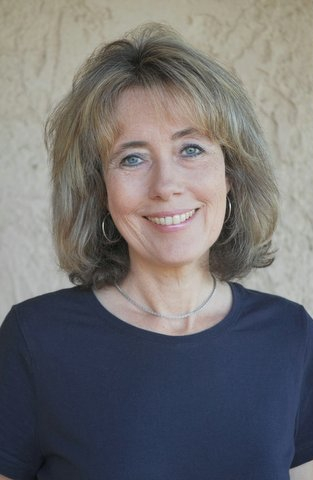
- Link in 2018
- Born: 5 October 1963 (age 62); Frankfurt am Main, Hesse, West Germany
- Occupation: Writer
- Writing career
- Language: German
- Genres: Mystery; General; Young adult fiction
- Notable awards: Goldene Feder (Golden Feather)

Charlotte Link (born 5 October 1963) is a German writer. She is among the most successful contemporary authors writing in German.

== Life ==
Charlotte Link is the daughter of well-known German writer and journalist Almuth Link. She wrote her first work, Die schöne Helena, when she was just 16 years old and published it at the age of 19.

She is known as much for novels about contemporary life as for psychological detective novels in the English manner. Her books Sturmzeit, Wilde Lupinen, and Die Stunde der Erben form a trilogy. These, among others, have been filmed for TV series for the German television station ZDF.

Her novel Am Ende des Schweigens was nominated in 2004 for the fiction category of the Deutsche Bücherpreis (German Book Prize), while her book Die Rosenzüchterin, published in 2000, remained for several weeks at the top of the Spiegel bestseller list.

== Selected works ==
Year	Original title	English title	Notes
1985	Cromwells Traum oder Die schöne Helena	Cromwell's Dream or The Beautiful Helena	
1986	Wenn die Liebe nicht endet	When Love Doesn't Die	
1987	Die Sterne von Marmalon	The Stars of Marmalon	
1987	Verbotene Wege	Forbidden Ways	
1989	Sturmzeit	Stormy Season	Stormy season trilogy: 1
1992	Wilde Lupinen	Wild Lupins	Stormy Season trilogy: 2
1993	Schattenspiel	Shadow Games	
1989	Die Stunde der Erben	The Heritage	Stormy season trilogy: 3
1996	Die Sünde der Engel	The Sin of the Angels	
1998	Der Verehrer	The Admirer	
1999	Das Haus der Schwestern	The Sisters' House	
2000	Die Rosenzüchterin	The Rose Gardener	Translated to English
2002	Die Täuschung	The Deception	
2003	Am Ende des Schweigens	At the End of Silence	
2005	Der fremde Gast	The Unknown Guest	Translated to English
2006	Die Insel	The Island	
2006	Das Echo der Schuld	The Echo of Guilt	
2008	Die letzte Spur	The Last Track	
2009	Das andere Kind	The Other Child	Translated to English
2010	Mitternachtspicknick	Midnight Picnic	YA fiction
2010	Gefährlicher Sommer	Dangerous Summer	YA fiction
2010	Mondschein Geflüster	Moonlight Whispers	YA fiction
2011	Diamantenraub	The Diamond Heist	YA fiction
2011	Der Beobachter	The Watcher	Translated to English
2012	Im Tal des Fuchses	In the Valley of the Fox	
2014	Sechs Jahre. Der Abschied von meiner Schwester	Six Years. Farewell to My Sister	Autobiography
2015	Die Betrogene	Cheated	
2016	Die Entscheidung	Decision	
2018	Die Suche	The Search	

== Awards ==
In 2007, Link was awarded the Goldene Feder (Golden Feather) for her literary achievements.

== Bibliography ==
- Olaf Kutzmutz, ed. (2009). Bestseller: Das Beispiel Charlotte Link [Bestsellers: The example of Charlotte Link]. Wolfenbütteler Akademie-Texte (in German). Vol. 46. Wolfenbüttel: Bundesakademie für kulturelle Bildung. ISBN 978-3-929622-46-1.
