= Blanvalet =

German publishing house

- Parent company: Verlagsgruppe Penguin Random House (Bertelsmann)
- Founded: 1935
- Founder: Nicola Bartels
- Country of origin: Germany
- Headquarters location: Munich
- Publication types: fiction, non-fiction
- Official website: www.blanvalet.de

Blanvalet is a German publishing house, based in Munich, which was founded in 1935 in Berlin and is now part of the Bertelsmann's Random House publishing group. Blanvalet publishes entertainment literature and non-fiction, first in hardcover, and as paperbacks since 1998. The publisher became well known with the novel series "Angélique". More recent authors include Charlotte Link, Marc Elsberg, Karin Slaughter, Diana Gabaldon and George R. R. Martin.

== History ==
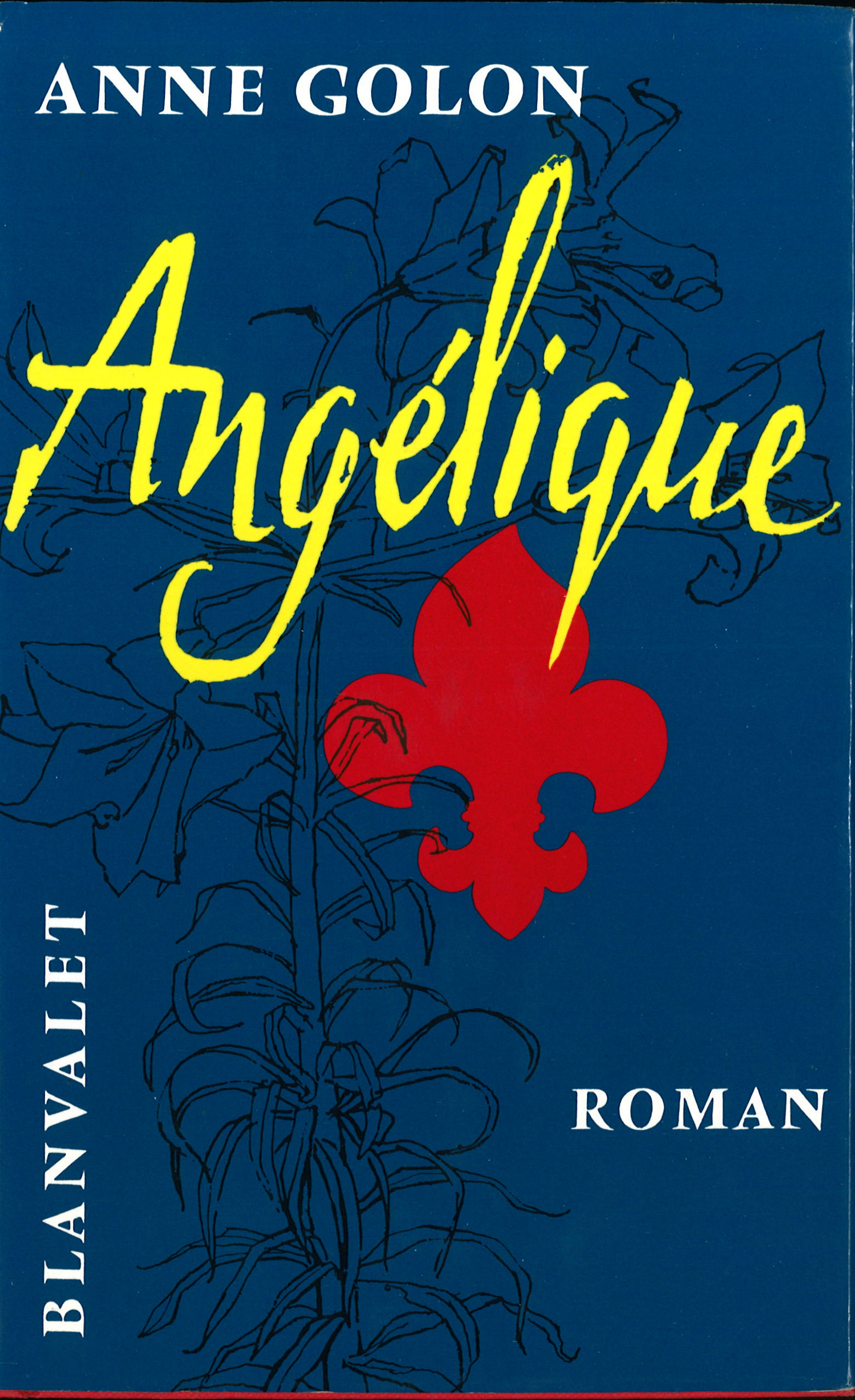
Angélique (1956)

Lothar Blanvalet founded, on 1 April 1935 in Berlin, the "Buchwarte publishing Lothar Blanvalet", which was named after him and its publications included humorous works. The operation was registered as a private company in the commercial register and established in 1937. After the end of World War II, in January 1946, the publisher received the license to continue publishing activity. The program focused on fiction - mainly criminal and adventure novels – as well as art books and graphics. The first titles published by Blanvalet were, "Hinein!" from soccer player Hanne Sobek, "Nueces und Shorty", "Spuren im Cañon", "Die goldene Hölle", "Die schwarzen Berge" from Clarence E. Mulford and "Land ohne Frau" from Armin Otto Huber. In addition to German authors such as Albrecht Haushofer ("Moabiter Sonette") Lothar Blanvalet also published American literature, for example, William Keepers Maxwell Jr.'s "Junges Blatt am Baum" or Ben Lucien Burman's "Der große Strom".

1954 Blanvalet launched, under the name "Blanvalet-Sport-Taschenbücher" (Blanvalet sport paperbacks), a program that was terminated without success after only two issues. Larger demand was received for the book "Der Weltraum rückt uns näher" by Donald E. Keyhouse. Commercial success was recorded by Blanvalet Publishers in 1956 with the Angélique novels. The German edition of the novels was published by Blanvalet even before the French original. By the end of 1963, the first four novels of the series reached a circulation of over 680,000 copies. In 1965 a controversy developed around the Angélique series between Blanvalet and Bertelsmann. The company had offered the novel as an advertising premium for new members of the Bertelsmann Lesering, which Blanvalet criticized as a surprising offer. The publisher refused to cooperate with Bertelsmann since the late 1950s and sold licenses for novels by Anne Golon to competitors of the Bertelsmann Lesering.

Starting in 1973, Blanvalet began awarding other publishers the rights to publish paperback editions of its successful books, including the Rowohlt Verlag. In 1974, Lothar Blanvalet sold his company, for reasons of age, to the Bertelsmann publishing group to which he stated that they would ensure continuity in his lifework. Before this, the publisher had already been relocated from Berlin to Munich. Lothar Blanvalet died on January 17, 1979, in Berlin. Blanvalet founded with publishers Penhaligon and Limes, a common corporate part of Random House publishing group which is led by Nicola Bartels.

== Program ==
Among the better-known authors of the 1980s and 1990s include Sidney Sheldon, Ruth Rendell, Elizabeth George and Diana Gabaldon. Blanvalet initially published mainly hardcovers. In 1996 the publisher was involved alongside Albrecht Knaus, Goldmann and Siedler in the paperback publisher btb, since 1998 Blanvalet also publishes paperbacks. In bookshops, the Blanvalet Publishing and the Blanvalet Paperback Publisher are run as independent publishers. In 2014 Blanvalet was the third largest German-language publisher. Today, the Blanvalet program covers all areas of fiction and entertaining nonfiction. The program is divided in the areas of "tension", "most Popular women entertainment", "Historical novels", "nonfiction" and" Fantasy and Science Fiction". Blanvalet became famous in recent years especially with bestsellers by authors such as Charlotte Link, Marc Elsberg or Karin Slaughter. Also included are Joanne K. Rowling, Nora Roberts, George RR Martin and Susan Elizabeth Phillips.
