= Cathi Hanauer =

American journalist (born 1962)

- Born: October 5, 1962 (age 63); Fort Monmouth, New Jersey, U.S.
- Spouse: Daniel Jones
- Website: cathihanauer.com

Cathi Hanauer is an American novelist, journalist, essayist, and non-fiction writer. Her novels include Gone (2012), Sweet Ruin (2006), My Sister's Bones (1996), and the forthcoming Unbeautiful (Harper, 2027). She conceived and edited the 2002 New York Times best-selling essay anthology The Bitch in the House: 26 Women Tell the Truth about Sex, Solitude, Work, Motherhood and Marriage, which was published in more than a dozen countries, and the 2016 sequel The Bitch is Back: Older, Wiser, and (Getting) Happier, which was an NPR "Best Book" of 2016. She is co-founder, along with her then-husband, Daniel Jones, of The New York Times column "Modern Love".

Hanauer's articles, essays and criticism have appeared in The New York Times, The Washington Post, Elle, O-the Oprah Magazine, Real Simple, Glamour, Self, Whole Living, and other magazines. She wrote the monthly books column for both Glamour and Mademoiselle and was the monthly relationships advice columnist for Seventeen for seven years.

A graduate of the Newhouse School at Syracuse University and of the MFA program at the University of Arizona, she has taught writing at The New School, in New York, and at the University of Arizona, in Tucson.

Hanauer has two grown children with Jones and lives in New York City. In late 2025, Hanauer authored a popular Opinion essay in The New York Times where she said that she and Jones had amicably separated.
