= Heartless Bitches International =

Satirical feminist website

- Website type: E-zine / community
- Owner: Natalie P.
- Creator: Natalie P.
- Website: heartless-bitches.com
- Registration: Optional
- Launched: 1996
- Current status: Offline

Heartless Bitches International was a humorous website primarily targeted at women. It was started as a joke in 1996 by Ottawa, Canada, software developer "Natalie P", satirizing the stereotype that all assertive, strong women are "heartless bitches". It was a repository of thousands of articles, primarily dealing with the expectations and stereotypes that society tries to enforce on men and women, the problems they cause, and how to overcome them.

The website particularly rejects "sappiness" and women considered excessively emotional. Heartless Bitches International claims it does not celebrate being insensitive, manipulative, selfish, cruel, or man-hating; it celebrates the positive qualities in people, like assertiveness, self-reliance, and an unwillingness to be a martyr, which led to them being stereotyped as "heartless bitches". Apart from admiring these qualities, Heartless Bitches International does not have a party line or rigid set of beliefs, preferring its members to be open-minded and to trust themselves enough to make their own judgments. The website uses "bitch" to mean the backronym "Being In Total Control Honey".

It was one of the earliest websites catered specifically toward women at a time when the World Wide Web was largely a male domain. It was nominated for a Webby Award in 2002 in the humor category. In 2001 it had over 6,500 members and about 65,000 page views per week. This website no longer exists.

== Content ==
=== Regular columns ===
The majority of HBI's content is user-submitted, but there are a number of semi-regular writers and columns:

- **Bitchitorial** – An editorial written by Natalie, who also runs the site and gets most of the mail.
- **Weak of the Week** – JadeSyren, the site's "bitch-bouncer", riffs off the rejected membership applications for the enjoyment of all. The rejected application is presented in full with Jade's commentary in bold.
- **I'M NOT BITTER** – A personal column by The Morrigan
- **Auntie Dote** – An advice column

=== User-submitted ===
The majority of the articles on Heartless Bitches International are submitted by the readers, and are archived under the heading "Deal With It!"

- **Rants** – Self-explanatory.
- **Collected Quotes** – An archive of Heartless Bitches International's "quote of the week". The quotes all somehow relate the Heartless Bitch philosophy. The Quote of the Week is displayed on the site's index page, and changes every update.
- **The Manipulator Files** – Articles about avoiding and dealing with manipulative relationships, written from personal experience. Also contains a list of "Red Flags" to help identify manipulators before they do too much damage.
- **Nice Guys? BLEAH** – The biggest 'self saucing' section; It attacks the beliefs of men who think they ("nice guys") deserve female attention because they act "nicely"—not out of the goodness of their hearts or because they care, but because they want something in return—and then spend their time whining about the "fact" that women only want to date jerks. As the site says:

The truth of the matter is that there are genuinely caring, compassionate, decent, fun guys out there who have NO TROUBLE meeting people, getting dates, and having relationships.

Unfortunately, many of the guys who DO have trouble, insist on laying blame and asserting that women don't want them because they are too "Nice". These people who call themselves "Nice Guys" can't see that THEIR OWN behavior is the problem. Whether it is targeting women who are troubled to begin with, or acting in a manipulative, patronizing or obsequious fashion, these guys sabotage themselves and blame others for their misfortunes.

The section is updated very frequently because of the large amount of mail received from "Nice Guys" who feel they are misunderstood, as well as people who have had to deal with them.

- **Sappy Site of the Week** – Marlene ("the queen of mean") profiles websites considered laughably sappy, stupid, or both. Similar to Something Awful's "Awful Link of the Day".
- **Pukefest** – Another long and frequently updated section, Pukefest is where readers chime in with lists of things that make them want to puke. It is received and sorted by Natalie.
- **MaleBag** – Comments from male readers divided into "Signs of Intelligent Life", "Free Time at the Psychiatric Hospital" and "They JUST DON'T GET IT". There is also general comments from both men and women.
- **Unclassified Comments** – Reader mail, positive and negative, some with commentary, some without.

=== Pop culture ===
Examples of Heartless Bitchiness in popular culture.

- **Honorary Heartless Bitches** – Examples of women who upheld the Heartless Bitches ideals throughout history, such as over-70s women's rights crusaders The Raging Grannies or the Iceni warrior-queen Boudica.
- **Adult books** – Books with Heartless Bitch-style themes and characters for adults.
- **Children's books** – Books for children with strong female role models, a lack of princesses needing rescuing and messages about getting off your ass and doing something instead of waiting for things to somehow work out all right in the end.
- **Movies** – Movies with Heartless Bitch-style themes and characters.

=== Other ===
There is also a shop selling "Heartless Bitch Meanies doll" as well as clothing.

== Membership ==
HBI also has a membership section. Applying for membership requires an essay on why the applicant is a Heartless Bitch. Applications deemed particularly bad are publicly ridiculed in the Weak of the Week section.

- Member Section – Sections for members and prospective members. Despite the majority of the site being from a female perspective, both men and women can become members.
- Real Life Members, Exemplary Members – A list of the members, with an autobiographical paragraph describing them and a personal "one-liner".
- BitchBoard – The website's BBS.
