= 1897 in the United States =

- Decades: 1870s; 1880s; 1890s; 1900s; 1910s
- See also: History of the United States (1865–1918); Timeline of United States history (1860–1899); List of years in the United States

Events from the year 1897 in the United States.

== Incumbents ==
=== Federal government ===
- President:

Grover Cleveland (D-New York) (until March 4)
William McKinley (R-Ohio) (starting March 4)

- Vice President:

Adlai E. Stevenson I (D-Illinois) (until March 4)
Garret Hobart (R-New Jersey) (starting March 4)

- Chief Justice: Melville Fuller (Illinois)
- Speaker of the House of Representatives: Thomas Brackett Reed (R-Maine)
- Congress: 54th (until March 4), 55th (starting March 4)

==== State governments ====
Governors and lieutenant governors

=== Governors ===
- Governor of Alabama: Joseph F. Johnston (Democratic)
- Governor of Arkansas: James Paul Clarke (Democratic) (until January 18), Daniel Webster Jones (Democratic) (starting January 18)
- Governor of California: James Budd (Democratic)
- Governor of Colorado: Albert McIntire (Republican) (until January 12), Alva Adams (Democratic) (starting January 12)
- Governor of Connecticut: Owen Vincent Coffin (Republican) (until January 6), Lorrin A. Cooke (Republican) (starting January 6)
- Governor of Delaware: William T. Watson (Democratic) (until January 19), Ebe W. Tunnell (Democratic) (starting January 19)
- Governor of Florida: Henry L. Mitchell (Democratic) (until January 5), William D. Bloxham (Democratic) (starting January 5)
- Governor of Georgia: William Yates Atkinson (Democratic)
- Governor of Idaho: William J. McConnell (Republican) (until January 4), Frank Steunenberg (Democratic) (starting January 4)
- Governor of Illinois: John Peter Altgeld (Democratic) (until January 11), John Riley Tanner (Republican) (starting January 11)
- Governor of Indiana: Claude Matthews (Democratic) (until January 11), James A. Mount (Republican) (starting January 11)
- Governor of Iowa: Francis M. Drake (Republican)
- Governor of Kansas: Edmund N. Morrill (Republican) (until January 11), John W. Leedy (Populist) (starting January 11)
- Governor of Kentucky: William O. Bradley (Republican)
- Governor of Louisiana: Murphy James Foster, Sr. (Democratic)
- Governor of Maine: Henry B. Cleaves (Republican) (until January 2), Llewellyn Powers (Republican) (starting January 2)
- Governor of Maryland: Lloyd Lowndes, Jr. (Republican)
- Governor of Massachusetts: Roger Wolcott (Republican)
- Governor of Michigan: John T. Rich (Republican) (until January 1), Hazen S. Pingree (Republican) (starting January 1)
- Governor of Minnesota: David M. Clough (Republican)
- Governor of Mississippi: Anselm J. McLaurin (Democratic)
- Governor of Missouri: William Joel Stone (Democratic) (until January 11), Lon Vest Stephens (Democratic) (starting January 11)
- Governor of Montana:
  - until January 3: John E. Rickards (Republican)
  - January 3-4: vacant
  - starting January 4: Robert Burns Smith (Democratic)
- Governor of Nebraska: Silas A. Holcomb (Democratic)
- Governor of Nevada: Reinhold Sadler (Silver)
- Governor of New Hampshire: Charles A. Busiel (Republican) (until January 7), George A. Ramsdell (Republican) (starting January 7)
- Governor of New Jersey: John W. Griggs (Republican)
- Governor of New York: Frank S. Black (Republican) (starting January 1)
- Governor of North Carolina: Elias Carr (Democratic) (until January 12), Daniel Lindsay Russell (Republican) (starting January 12)
- Governor of North Dakota: Roger Allin (Republican) (until January 6), Frank A. Briggs (Republican) (starting January 6)
- Governor of Ohio: Asa S. Bushnell (Republican)
- Governor of Oregon: William Paine Lord (Republican)
- Governor of Pennsylvania: Daniel H. Hastings (Republican)
- Governor of Rhode Island: Charles W. Lippitt (Republican) (until May 25), Elisha Dyer, Jr. (Republican) (starting May 25)
- Governor of South Carolina: John Gary Evans (Democratic) (until January 18), William Haselden Ellerbe (Democratic) (starting January 18)
- Governor of South Dakota: Charles H. Sheldon (Republican) (until January 1), Andrew E. Lee (Populist) (starting January 1)
- Governor of Tennessee: Peter Turney (Democratic) (until January 21), Robert Love Taylor (Democratic) (starting January 21)
- Governor of Texas: Charles A. Culberson (Democratic)
- Governor of Utah: Heber Manning Wells (Republican)
- Governor of Vermont: Josiah Grout (Republican)
- Governor of Virginia: Charles Triplett O'Ferrall (Democratic)
- Governor of Washington: John McGraw (Republican) (until January 13), John Rankin Rogers (Populist)/(Democratic) (starting January 13)
- Governor of West Virginia: William A. MacCorkle (Democratic) (until March 4), George W. Atkinson (Republican) (starting March 4)
- Governor of Wisconsin: William H. Upham (Republican) (until January 4), Edward Scofield (Republican) (starting January 4)
- Governor of Wyoming: William A. Richards (Republican)

=== Lieutenant governors ===
- Lieutenant Governor of California: William T. Jeter (Democratic)
- Lieutenant Governor of Colorado: Jared L. Brush (Republican)
- Lieutenant Governor of Connecticut: Lorrin A. Cooke (Republican) (until January 6), James D. Dewell (Republican) (starting January 6)
- Lieutenant Governor of Idaho: F. J. Mills (Republican) (until January 4), George F. Moore (Democratic) (starting January 4)
- Lieutenant Governor of Illinois: Joseph B. Gill (Democratic) (until January 11), William Northcott (Republican) (starting January 11)
- Lieutenant Governor of Indiana: Mortimer Nye (Democratic) (until January 11), William S. Haggard (Republican) (starting January 11)
- Lieutenant Governor of Iowa: Matt Parrott (Republican)
- Lieutenant Governor of Kansas: James A. Troutman (Republican) (until January 11), Alexander M. Harvey (Populist) (starting January 11)
- Lieutenant Governor of Kentucky: William Jackson Worthington (Republican)
- Lieutenant Governor of Louisiana: Robert H. Snyder (Democratic)
- Lieutenant Governor of Massachusetts: vacant (until month and day unknown), Winthrop M. Crane (political party unknown) (starting month and day unknown)
- Lieutenant Governor of Michigan: Joseph R. McLaughlin (Republican) (until January 1), Thomas B. Dunstan (Republican) (starting January 1)
- Lieutenant Governor of Minnesota: Frank A. Day (Republican) (until January 5), John L. Gibbs (Republican) (starting January 5)
- Lieutenant Governor of Mississippi: J. H. Jones (Democratic)
- Lieutenant Governor of Missouri: John B. O'Meara (Democratic) (until January 11), August Bolte (Democratic) (starting January 11)
- Lieutenant Governor of Montana: Alexander Campbell Botkin (Republican) (until month and day unknown), Archibald E. Spriggs (political party unknown) (starting month and day unknown)
- Lieutenant Governor of Nebraska: Robert E. Moore (Democratic) (until month and day unknown), James E. Harris (Democratic) (starting month and day unknown)
- Lieutenant Governor of Nevada: vacant (until month and day unknown), James R. Judge (political party unknown) (starting month and day unknown)
- Lieutenant Governor of New York: Timothy L. Woodruff (Republican) (starting January 1)
- Lieutenant Governor of North Carolina: Rufus A. Doughton (Democratic) (until January 12), Charles A. Reynolds (Republican) (starting January 12)
- Lieutenant Governor of North Dakota: John H. Worst (Republican) (until January 6), Joseph M. Devine (Republican) (starting January 6)
- Lieutenant Governor of Ohio: Asa W. Jones (Republican)
- Lieutenant Governor of Pennsylvania: Walter Lyon (Republican)
- Lieutenant Governor of Rhode Island: Edwin Allen (Republican) (until May 25), Aram J. Pothier (Republican) (starting May 25)
- Lieutenant Governor of South Carolina: Washington H. Timmerman (Democratic) (until January 18), Miles Benjamin McSweeney (Democratic) (starting January 18)
- Lieutenant Governor of South Dakota: Charles N. Herreid (Republican) (until January 1), Daniel T. Hindman (Republican) (starting January 1)
- Lieutenant Governor of Tennessee: Ernest Pillow (Democratic) (until month and day unknown), John Thompson (Democratic) (starting month and day unknown)
- Lieutenant Governor of Texas: George Taylor Jester (Democratic)
- Lieutenant Governor of Vermont: Nelson W. Fisk (Republican)
- Lieutenant Governor of Virginia: Robert Craig Kent (Democratic)
- Lieutenant Governor of Washington: F. H. Luce (Republican) (until January 13), Thurston Daniels (Populist) (starting January 13)
- Lieutenant Governor of Wisconsin: Emil Baensch (Republican)

== Events ==
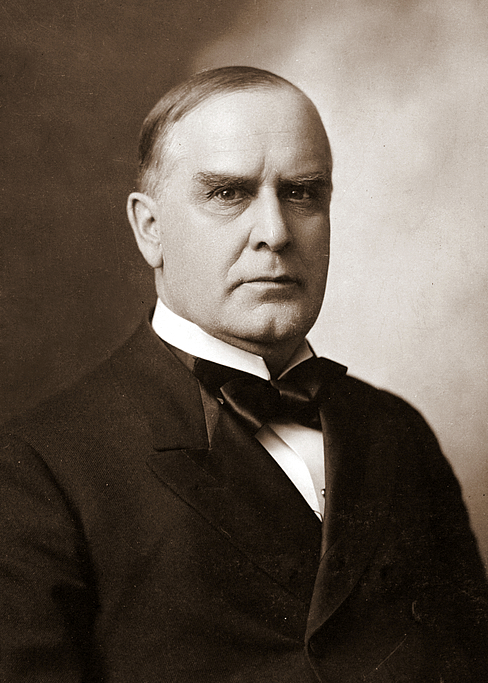
March 4: William McKinley becomes the 25th U.S. president

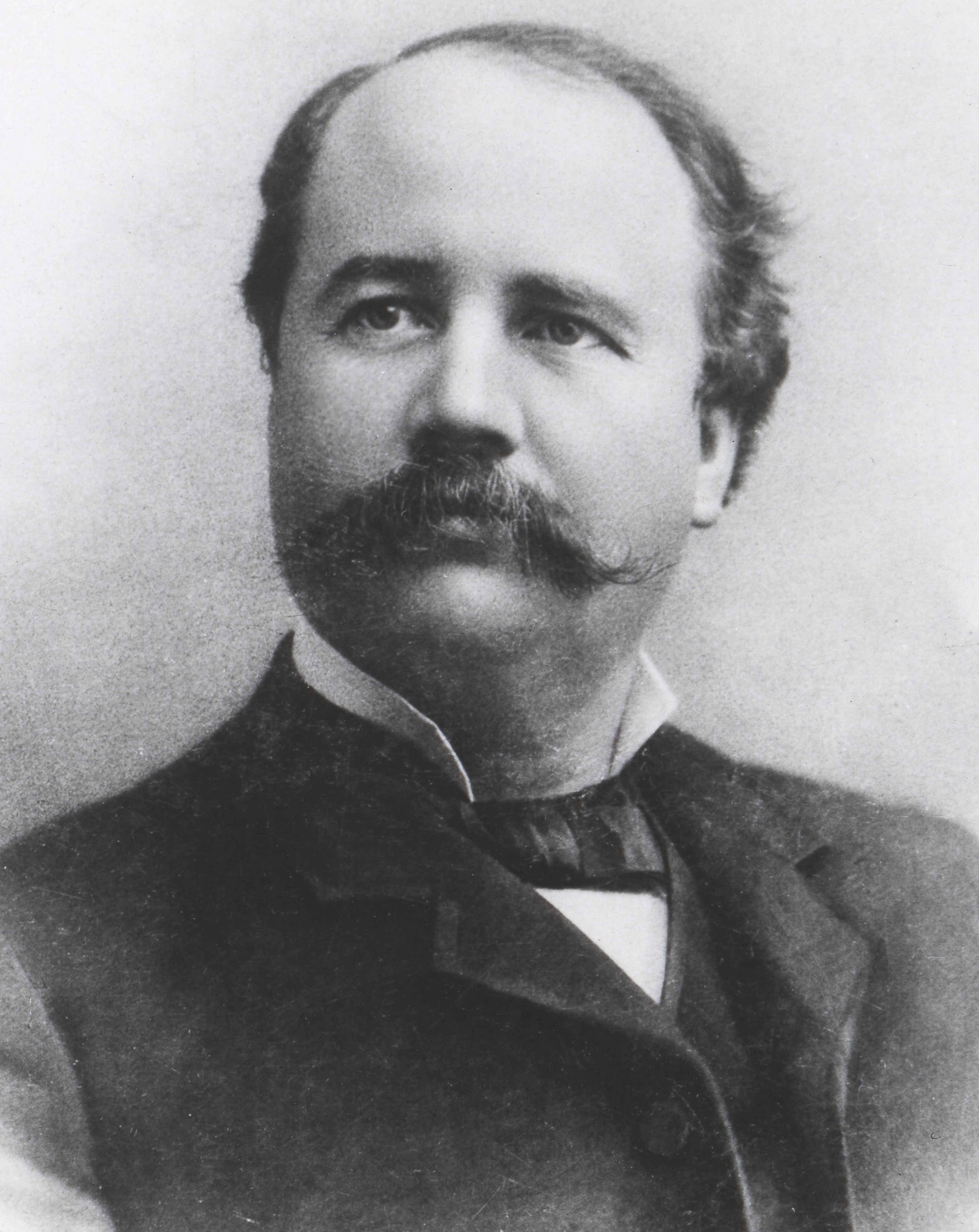
Garret Hobart becomes the 24th U.S. vice president

=== January–March ===
- January 2 – Alpha Omicron Pi sorority is founded at Barnard College in New York City
- January 23 – Elva Zona Heaster is found dead in Greenbrier County, West Virginia. The resulting murder trial of her husband is perhaps the only capital case in United States history, where spectral evidence helps secure a conviction.
- February 19 – United States Copyright Office established as a department in the Library of Congress.
- February 22 – Black Hills National Forest is established.
- March 4 – William McKinley is sworn in as the 25th president of the United States, and Garret Hobart is sworn in as the 24th vice president of the United States.
- March 9 – Cordelia A. Greene Library is established in Castile, New York

=== April–June ===
- April 19 – The first Boston Marathon is run, with fifteen men competing, and won by John McDermott.
- April 27 – Grant's Tomb is dedicated in New York.
- May 1 – The Tennessee Centennial Exposition opens in Nashville, for 6 months, illuminated by many electric lights.
- June 1 – American miners begin a strike, which successfully establishes the United Mine Workers Union and brings about the 8-hour work day to mines.
- June 2 – Mark Twain, responding to rumors that he is dead, is quoted by the New York Journal as saying, "The report of my death was an exaggeration."

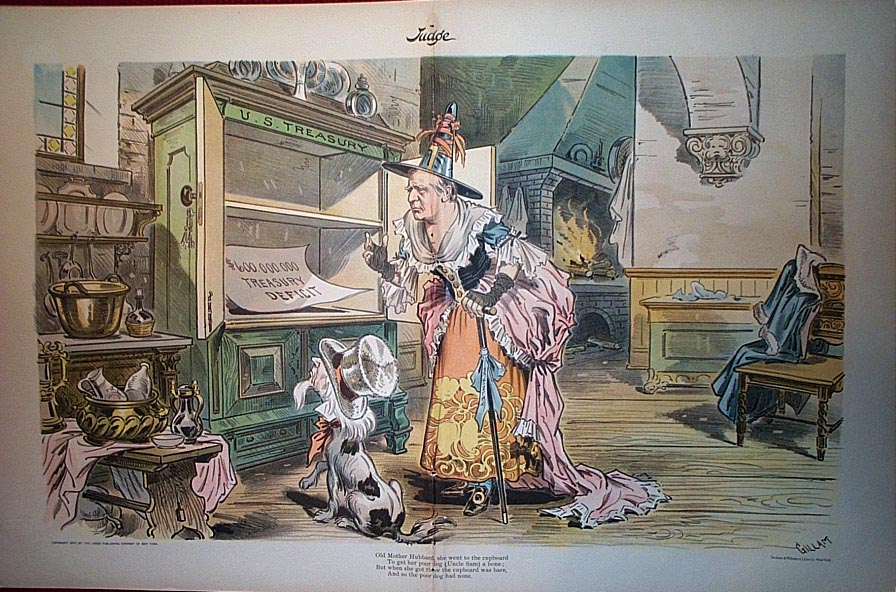
President McKinley as Old Mother Hubbard finds the federal treasury cupboard bare

=== July–September ===
- July 17 – The Klondike Gold Rush begins when the first successful prospectors arrive in Seattle. On July 25 Jack London sails to join the Rush.
- July 31 – Mount Saint Elias, the second highest peak in the United States and Canada, is first ascended.
- August 21 – Oldsmobile is founded in Lansing, Michigan by Ransom E. Olds.
- August 31 – Thomas Edison is granted a patent for the Kinetoscope, a precursor of the movie projector.
- September 1 – The Boston subway opens, becoming the first underground metro in North America.
- September 10 – Lattimer Massacre: A sheriff's posse kills more than 19 unarmed immigrant miners in Pennsylvania.
- September 21 – In response to a letter written by 8-year-old Virginia O'Hanlon, The Sun (New York City) publishes an (anonymous) editorial by Francis Pharcellus Church stating, "Yes, Virginia, there is a Santa Claus".

=== October–December ===
- October 4 – Columbia University opens its new campus in New York City.
- October 12 – The USS Baltimore (Cruiser # 3, later CM-1) is recommissioned, since 1890, for several months of duty in the Hawaiian Islands.
- October 23 – The Kappa Delta sorority is founded at State Female Normal School, later Longwood University, in Farmville, Virginia.
- November 1 – The Library of Congress Building in Washington, D.C., designed by Paul J. Pelz, is opened.

=== Undated ===
- Elbridge Ayer Burbank begins painting portraits of Native Americans in the United States from life.
- Women photographers Zaida Ben-Yusuf and Gertrude Käsebier open portrait studios in New York City.
- Florist's Review trade magazine is founded.
- The Auburn University Marching Band is created at Auburn University (known at this date as the Agricultural and Mechanical College of Alabama) in Auburn, Alabama.
- The Duke University Debating Society is founded.

=== Ongoing ===
- Gay Nineties (1890–1899)
- Progressive Era (1890s–1920s)
- Lochner era (c. 1897–c. 1937)

== Births ==
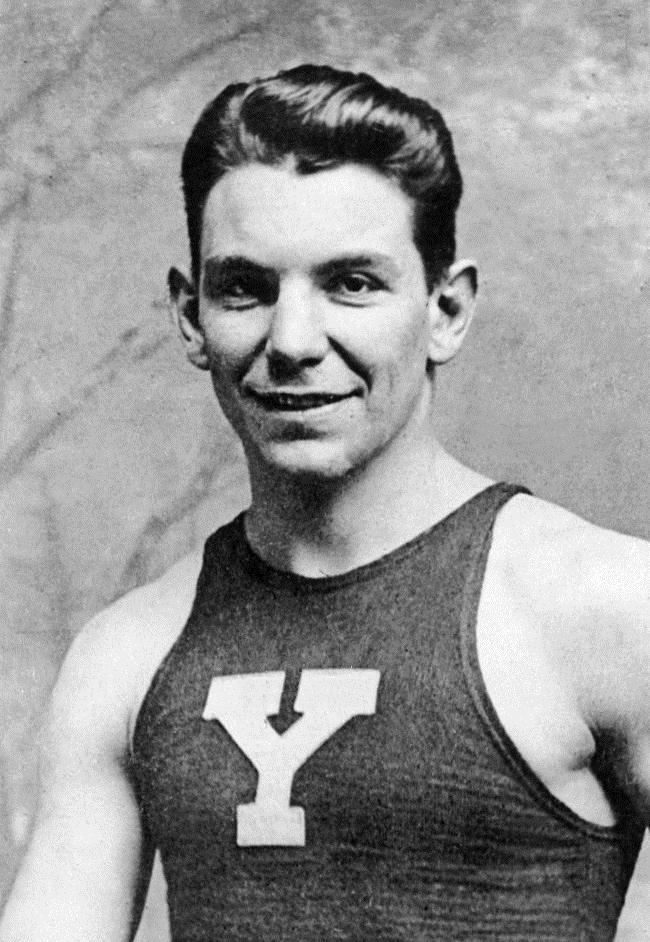
Eddie Eagan

- January 3 – Marion Davies, film actress (died 1961)
- February 7 – Quincy Porter, composer (died 1966)
- February 21 – Elizabeth Harrison Walker, lawyer, daughter of President Benjamin Harrison (died 1955)
- February 27 – Marian Anderson, African American contralto (died 1993)
- March 2 – Minor Hall, jazz drummer (died 1959)
- March 4 – Lefty O'Doul, baseball player and restaurateur (died 1969)
- March 6 – John D. MacArthur, businessman and philanthropist (died 1978)
- March 8 – Charles W. Brooks, U.S. Senator from Illinois from 1940 to 1949 (died 1957)
- March 11 – Henry Cowell, composer (died 1965)
- March 15 – Jackson Scholz, sprinter (died 1986)
- March 24 – Theodora Kroeber, writer and anthropologist (died 1979)
- March 31 – Harold Houser, admiral, 35th Governor of American Samoa (died 1981)
- April 9 – John B. Gambling, radio talk-show host (died 1974)
- April 26 – Eddie Eagan, Olympic gold medal boxer and bobsledder (died 1967)
- April 29 – Charles Seel, actor (died 1980)
- May 6 – William A. Purtell, U.S. Senator from Connecticut in 1952 and from 1953 to 1959 (died 1978)
- May 14 – Sidney Bechet, African American jazz saxophonist (died 1959 in France)
- June 6 – Homer E. Capehart, U.S. Senator from Indiana from 1945 to 1963 (died 1979)
- June 15 – Mary Ellis, actress (died 2003)
- July 9 – Albert C. Wedemeyer, U.S. Army general (died 1989)
- July 10 – John Gilbert, silent film actor (died 1936)
- July 20 – Tom Dickinson, American football player (died 1999)
- July 24 – Amelia Earhart, aviation pioneer and author
- July 25 – Helen Shaw, actress (died 1997)
- July 26 – Harold D. Cooley, politician, member of the U.S. House of Representatives from North Carolina (died 1974)
- August 10 – John W. Galbreath, businessman (died 1988)
- September 16 – Milt Franklyn, musical composer and arranger (died 1962)
- September 17 – Earl Webb, baseball player (died 1965)
- September 24 – Lee Fenner, American footballer (died 1964)
- September 25 – William Faulkner, novelist, recipient of the Nobel Prize in Literature in 1949 (died 1962)
- October 21 – Lloyd Hughes, actor (died 1958)
- October 22 – Marjorie Flack, children's author (died 1958)
- October 30 – Hope Emerson, actress and strongwoman (died 1960)
- November 2 – Richard Russell, Jr., U.S. Senator from Georgia from 1933 to 1971 (died 1971)
- November 8 – Dorothy Day, journalist and social activist (died 1980)
- November 9 – Harvey Hendrick, baseball player (died 1941)
- December 25 – Dorothy Peterson, actress (died 1979)

== Deaths ==
- June 14 1897 Juan Domingo Montoya civil war combat veteran. Mosquero canyon, New Mexico. Valverde, glorieta pass
- April 10 – Daniel W. Voorhees, U.S. Senator from Indiana from 1877 to 1897 (born 1827)
- April 23 – John Henry Raap, Chicago entrepreneur and retailer (born 1840)
- August 14 – James Z. George, U.S. Senator from Mississippi from 1881 to 1897 (born 1826)
- October 3 – Samuel J. R. McMillan, U.S. Senator from Minnesota from 1875 to 1887 (born 1826)
- October 11 – Charles W. Jones, Ireland-born U.S. Senator from Florida from 1875 to 1887 (born 1834)
- October 29 –
  - Henry George, writer, politician and political economist (born 1839)
  - William J. Babcock, Medal of Honor recipient (born 1841 in the United States)
- October 31 – Richard Von Albade Gammon, University of Georgia football fullback (died from in-game injury) (born 1879)
- November 3 – Thomas Lanier Clingman, North Carolina congressman, senator and confederate general (born 1812)

== See also ==
- List of American films of the 1890s
- Timeline of United States history (1860–1899)
