= 1900 Montana gubernatorial election =

- November 6, 1900
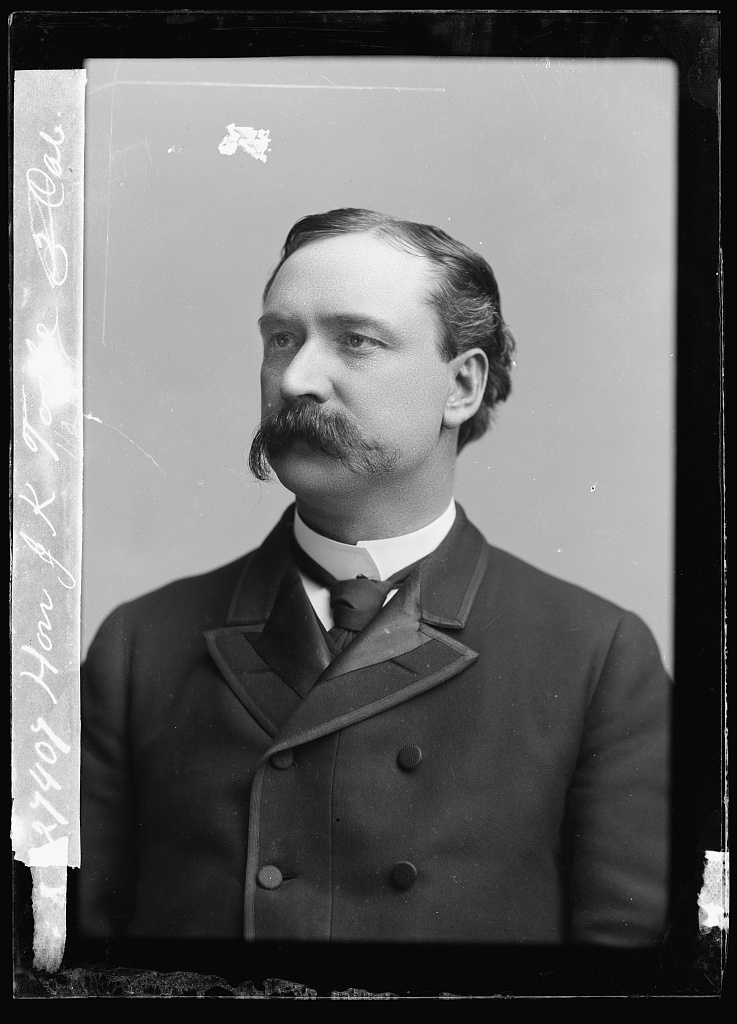

Nominee	Joseph Toole	David S. Folsom	Thomas S. Hogan
Party	Democratic	Republican	Independent Democrat
Popular vote	31,419	22,691	9,188
Percentage	49.24%	35.56%	14.40%
- County results Toole: 30–40% 40–50% 50–60% 60–70% Folsom: 40–50% 50–60% 60–70%
Governor before election
Robert Burns Smith
Democratic
Elected Governor
Joseph Toole
Democratic

The 1900 Montana gubernatorial election was held on November 6, 1900.

Democratic nominee Joseph Toole defeated Republican nominee David S. Folsom and Independent Democrat nominee Thomas S. Hogan with 49.24% of the vote.

== General election ==
=== Candidates ===
- Joseph Toole, Democratic, former Governor
- David S. Folsom, Republican, former State Senator
- Thomas S. Hogan, Independent Democrat, incumbent Secretary of State of Montana
- Julius F. Fox, Social Democrat

=== Results ===
1900 Montana gubernatorial election
Party	Candidate	Votes	%	±%
Democratic	Joseph Toole	31,419	49.24%	
Republican	David S. Folsom	22,691	35.56%	
Independent Democrat	Thomas S. Hogan	9,188	14.40%	
Social Democratic	Julius F. Fox	505	0.79%	
Majority		8,728	13.68%	
Turnout		63,803		
Democratic hold		Swing		

== Bibliography ==
- Glashan, Roy R. (1979). American Governors and Gubernatorial Elections, 1775-1978. Meckler Books. ISBN 0-930466-17-9.
- Gubernatorial Elections, 1787-1997. Washington, D.C.: Congressional Quarterly Inc. 1998. ISBN 1-56802-396-0.
- Dubin, Michael J. (2010). United States Gubernatorial Elections, 1861-1911. Jefferson, NC: McFarland & Co. ISBN 978-0-7864-4722-0.
