= 1896 Montana gubernatorial election =

- November 3, 1896
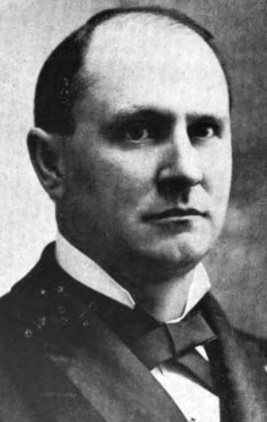

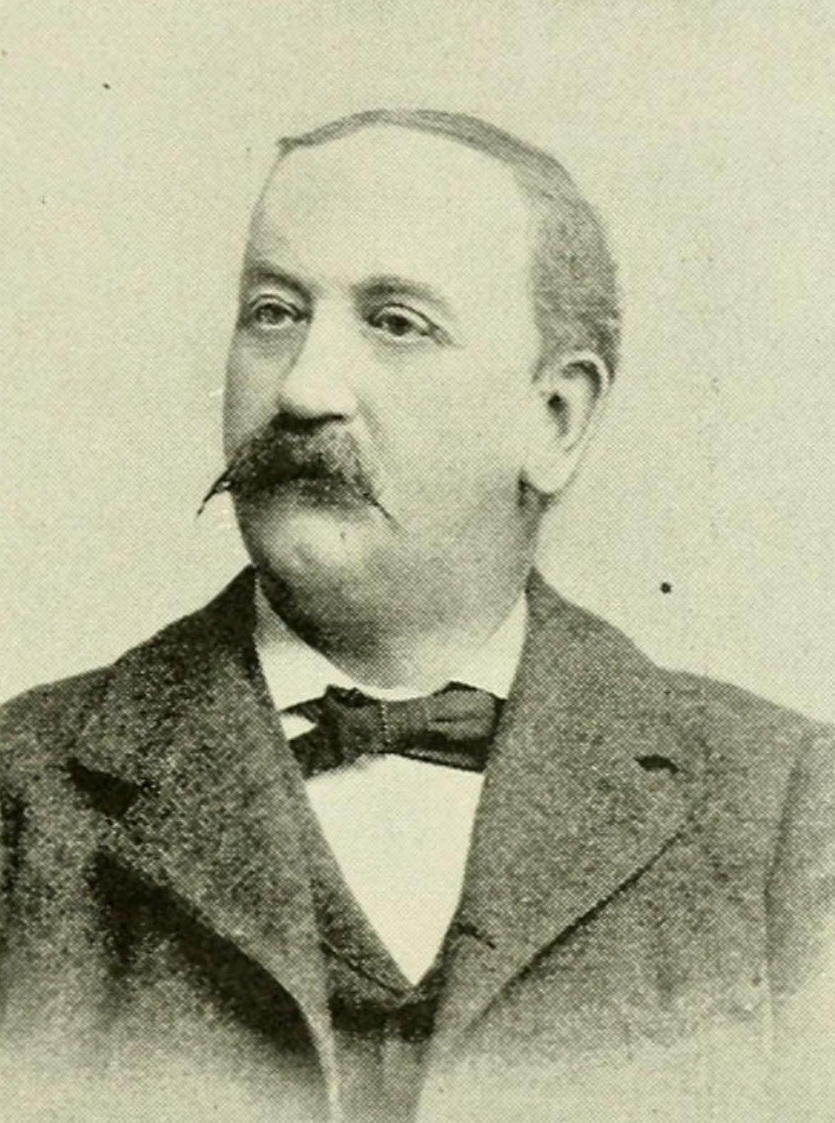
Nominee	Robert Burns Smith	Alexander C. Botkin
Party	Democratic	Republican
Alliance	Populist	Silver Republican
Popular vote	36,688	14,993
Percentage	70.99%	29.01%
- County results Smith: 50–60% 60–70% 70–80% 80–90% Botkin: 50–60% 60–70%
Governor before election
John E. Rickards
Republican
Elected Governor
Robert Burns Smith
Democratic

The 1896 Montana gubernatorial election was held on November 3, 1896.

Democratic and Populist nominee Robert Burns Smith defeated Republican and Silver Republican nominee Alexander C. Botkin with 70.99% of the vote.

== General election ==
=== Candidates ===
Major party candidates

- Robert Burns Smith, Democratic and Populist, former city attorney of Helena, Populist nominee for Montana's at-large congressional district in 1894
- Alexander C. Botkin, Republican and Silver Republican, incumbent Lieutenant Governor of Montana

=== Results ===
By 8 a.m. the following day, the chairman of the central committee for the state's Democratic party announced that, in his estimation, Robert Burns Smith had won the election "handsomely".

1896 Montana gubernatorial election
Party	Candidate	Votes	%	±%
Fusion	Robert Burns Smith	36,688	70.99%	
Republican	Alexander C. Botkin	14,993	29.01%	
Majority		21,695	41.98%	
Turnout		51,681		

== Bibliography ==
- Cockrill, W. M. (November 4, 1896). "Robert B. Smith". The Anaconda Standard.
- Glashan, Roy R. (1979). American Governors and Gubernatorial Elections, 1775-1978. Meckler Books. ISBN 0-930466-17-9.
- Gubernatorial Elections, 1787-1997. Washington, D.C.: Congressional Quarterly Inc. 1998. ISBN 1-56802-396-0.
- Dubin, Michael J. (2010). United States Gubernatorial Elections, 1861-1911. Jefferson, NC: McFarland & Co. ISBN 978-0-7864-4722-0.
