= Yucca Theater (Midland, Texas) =

Historic theater in Midland, Texas

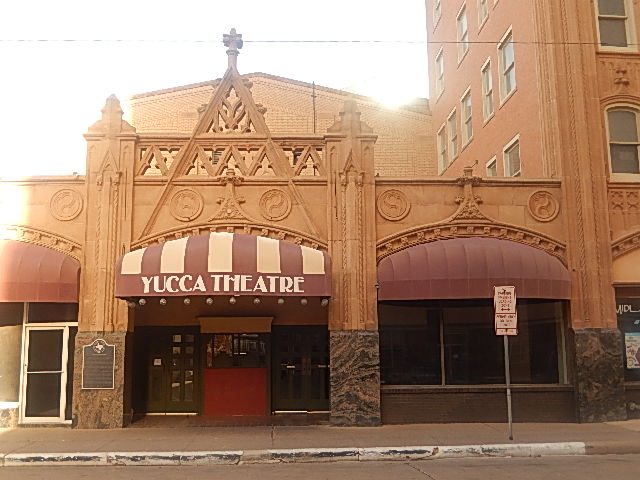
- Interactive map of Yucca Theater
- Address: 208 N Colorado St.
- Location: Midland, Texas
- Coordinates: 31.9988955°N 102.0765014°W
- Capacity: 550

Construction
- Opened: 1929
- Renovated: 1981
- Architect: H.B. Layman

The Yucca Theater is a theatre in Midland, Texas. In 1927, oilman and former Montana senator Thomas S. Hogan announced plans to build a theatre to complement the nearby Petroleum Building. Opened in 1929, the Yucca Theatre started as a movie and vaudeville house. The theatre is a Texas historic landmark. The Summer Mummers is a yearly production presented at the Yucca, and runs on Friday and Saturday nights from the first weekend in June to Labor Day weekend. There are typically 30 performances each summer. The show comprises a locally written melodrama, followed by the olio.

== Description ==
The building was designed by Wyatt C. Hedrick of Fort Worth and incorporated large cut sandstone blocks, marble, and columns in an Assyrian architecture-style. The interior, designed by H.B. Layman, featured gilded bulls, stenciled lotus flower lamps, and a two-tier balcony. The old middle eastern architecture style is a sign of the late 1920s, which was prominent at the time, thanks in part to the discovery of King Tut's tomb a few years earlier. Planning for the theater began in 1927; and it opened on December 5, 1929, featuring Vaudeville performers and filmed movie productions. Through the years, the theater eventually focused on just showing movies, and the original Yucca closed for good in 1974.

== Renovation and upgrades ==
In 1981, volunteers restored the Yucca to its original condition, saving it from destruction. They retained the original architecture featuring golden bulls and winged lions. There was one modification: they replaced the cabaret seating with tables and chairs. Professional crews were brought in to make a few additions, which included a tiered floor for the cabaret seating, as well as technology updates. The theater holds over 1600 seats. After the restoration, the Yucca became the new, permanent home of the annual Summer Mummers show. Other regularly scheduled performances, such as Broadway in the Basin, use the theater as their venue. In 2008, a new sound system was installed.

== The Summer Mummers ==
=== History ===
Street performers in the 1800s were called "mummers." After Midland Community Theatre (MCT) decided that the production would be presented in the summer, the name "Summer Mummers" was born. In 1949 it presented its first production entitled "The Drunkard." MCT director, Art Cole, starred in the first production. In the early years productions were presented in various locations, including VFW halls and theatre center, the former home of MCT. After the 1981 restoration of the Yucca Theater was completed, the Yucca became the new home of Summer Mummers. Summer Mummers still performs exclusively at the Yucca to this day. The profits from Summer Mummers directly benefit MCT. The theatre is on the list of Historic Texas Landmarks.

=== Format ===
==== The melodrama ====
The first half of the show features the melodrama in a Vaudeville style. A new locally written melodrama script is written every year, with some scripts being repeated now and then. Each script also features a general "theme" for the story (e.g., superheroes, zombies, Woodstock). The storyline usually follows the same linear structure, with a female heroine and her sidekick finding themselves in distress. The villain and his sidekick look to take advantage of the heroine's plight, with the ulterior motives of financial gain and the love of the heroine. The hero and hero's sidekick confront the villains, a struggle ensues, with the hero coming out victorious. The villains are vanquished, the hero and heroine fall in love, and the hero's sidekick gains the (sometimes unwanted) admiration of the heroine's sidekick.

The characters

The name of each character changes every year, however, the same basic character-types are featured in every script. These include:

- The Hero – Throughout the story, the hero is shown to be a moral, upstanding character who stays away from alcohol and sex. A point is always made to remind the audience that the hero graduated from Texas A&M University.
- The Hero's Sidekick – the hero's trusty companion. Although he stands for what's right, the Hero's Sidekick's interests are largely sexual. Although he is usually presented as the dumbest person in the story, it can be argued that he is one of the smarter characters.
- The Heroine – Like the Hero, she is portrayed as being a naive person. She stands for what's right, although some scripts hint at the idea that the Heroine is sexually frustrated.
- The Heroine's Sidekick – is the Heroine's best friend. She looks out for the best interests of her naive friend, while frequently acting sexually toward the Hero's Sidekick.
- The Villain – Driven by greed, the Villain is always looking for the next way to make money. Every script features the Villain kidnapping the Heroine.
- The Villain's Sidekick – The Villain's Sidekick is easily persuaded, and often deceitful. He helps the Villain carry out evil plans with hopes of financial gain.

==== The moviola ====
The moviola is a short, silent film, sped up significantly, and is shot entirely in black and white. It is filmed by a three-person team, and features the characters continuing the story in different areas of Midland. A new moviola is shot every year. The moviola, which relies on sight gags and cameos from local celebrities, uses title cards for dialogue and to announce intermission. During several parts of the melodrama, a movie screen drops down and shows moviola footage to advance the storyline and give the actors time to take a break. With the introduction of video, the editor of the moviola now adds special digital effects where needed.

==== The Olio ====
After the melodrama is finished, the olio begins. It has approximately 20 "acts," so the olio can best be compared to a comedic musical variety show. All acts are set to music and usually last 90 seconds or less.
