= Petroleum Building =

Petroleum Building may refer to:

- Petroleum Building (Tulsa), a building in Tulsa, Oklahoma
- Petroleum Building (Midland), a building in Midland, Texas
