= SS Joseph K. Toole =

Liberty ship built for service during World War II

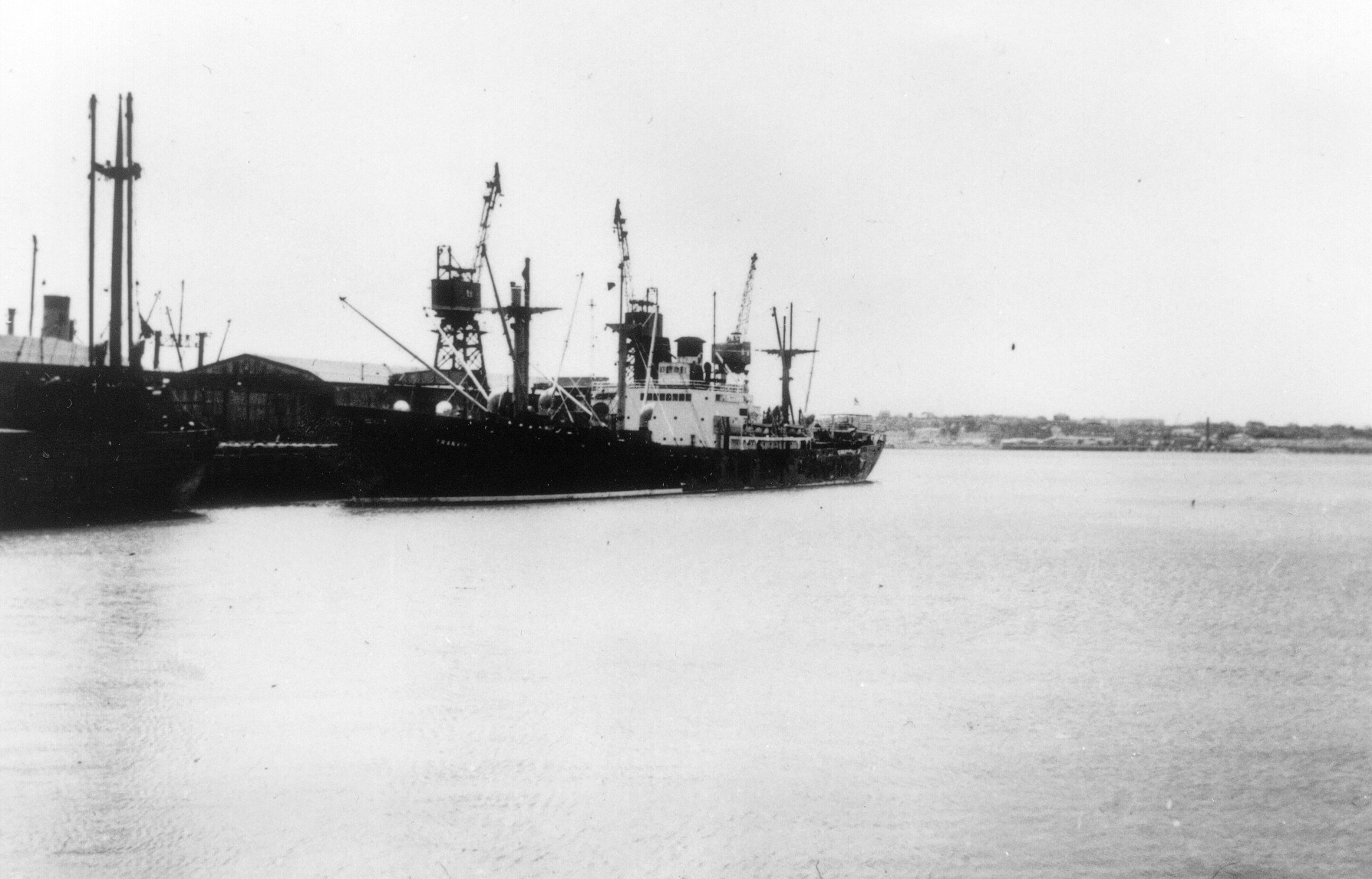
SS Joseph K. Toole under the name S/S Tranvik in Madagascar in 1950

SS Joseph K. Toole was a liberty ship built for service during World War II. It was named after the former governor of Montana Joseph K. Toole.

The ship was built by the Permanente Metals Corporation, Richmond, California, and was launched August 8, 1943. She was operated by Agwilines Inc at the Pacific theater.

The ship was sold to the Finnish shipping company Ab Benima Oy in 1947 and she was renamed S/S Tranvik. Another Finnish shipping company Rederibolaget Tranvik bought the ship in 1949. In 1954 the ship was sold to an Italian shipping company Soc. per Azioni Emanuele V. Parodi and she was renamed Marina Gabriella Parodi, later Marina G. Parodi. The ship was scrapped in La Spezia, Italy in 1965.
