= Summit Building (Midland) =

The Summit Building
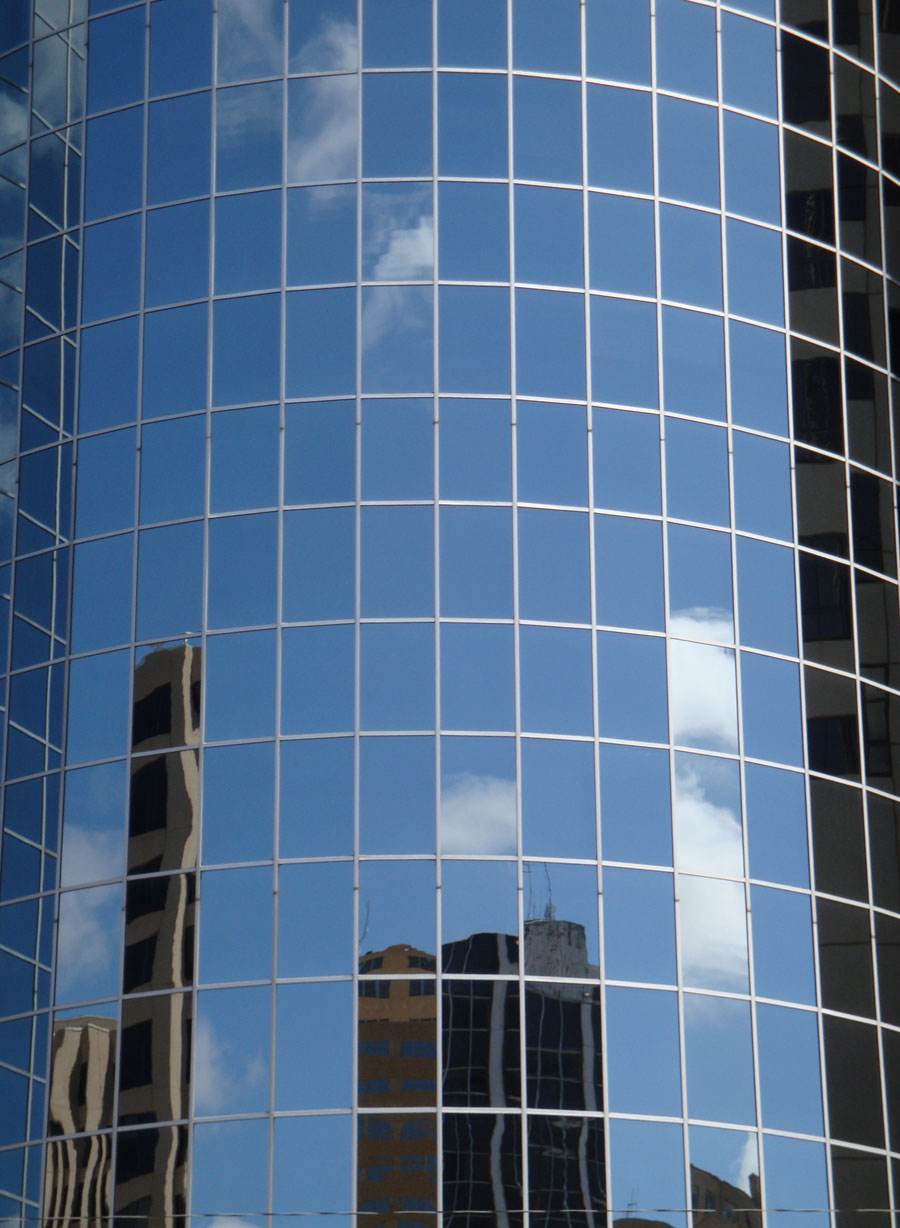
- A view of the all-glass building with the reflection of other buildings
- Interactive map of the The Summit Building area

Record height
- Preceded by: T.S. Hogan Petroleum Building
- Surpassed by: Vaughn Building

General information
- Status: Completed
- Type: Office Space
- Location: 300 N. Marienfeld; Midland, Texas
- Coordinates: 31.999515°N 102.080326°W
- Completed: 1981
- Opening: 1981

Height
- Top floor: 12

Technical details
- Floor count: 12
- Floor area: 148,936 sq ft (13,836.6 m^{2})

Other information
- Parking: Attached multi-level parking garage

The Summit Building is a twelve-story, all-glass high-rise building located at 300 North Marienfield in the business sector of Downtown Midland, Texas. The building is constructed with a more modern look than most of Midland's downtown buildings. In 2008, the Summit Building became the first building in the Midland area to be depicted on Google Earth in 3D mode.
