= Thomas S. Hogan =

American politician

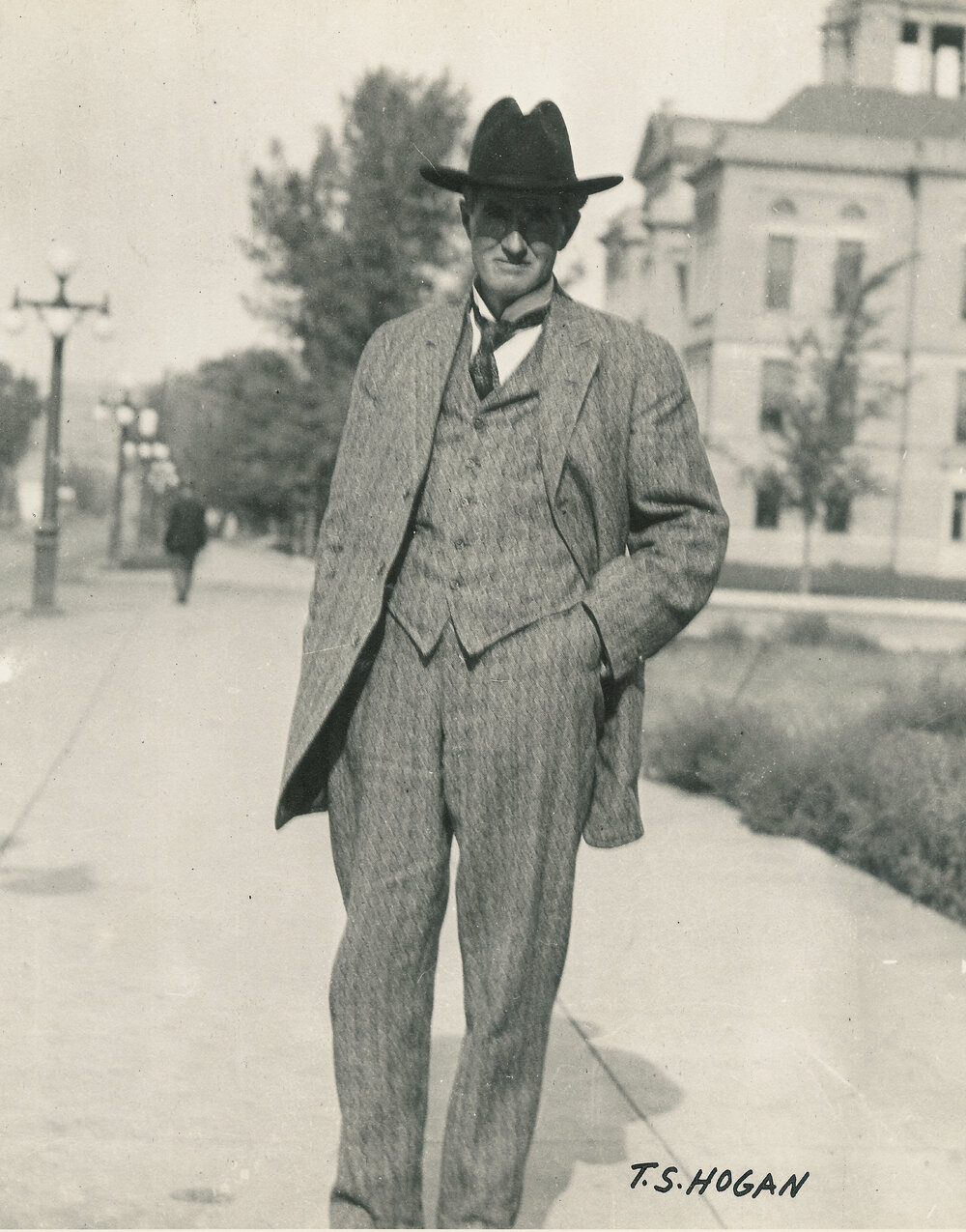

2nd Secretary of State of Montana
- In office January 1897 – January 1900
- Governor: Robert Burns Smith
- Preceded by: Louis Rotwitt
- Succeeded by: George M. Hayes

Personal details
- Born: Thomas Stephens Hogan; December 23, 1869 Chippewa Falls, Wisconsin
- Died: September 25, 1957 (aged 87) Los Angeles, California
- Resting place: El Paso, Texas
- Party: Populist

Thomas S. Hogan was a politician in Montana. He was born near Chippewa Falls, Wisconsin and died in Los Angeles, California.

== Career ==
Hogan unsuccessfully ran for the Montana House of Representatives in 1894. While serving as Montana Secretary of State, he was an independent Democratic candidate for governor of Montana in 1900 after not being selected at the party convention, but lost to Joseph Toole. He was later a member of the Montana Senate from 1910 to 1914.

He later built the Yucca Theater in Midland, Texas.
