= 1892 Montana gubernatorial election =

- November 8, 1892
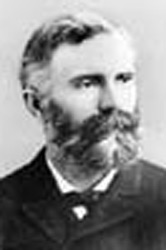

Nominee	John E. Rickards	Timothy E. Collins	William Kennedy
Party	Republican	Democratic	Populist
Popular vote	18,187	17,650	7,794
Percentage	41.17%	39.96%	17.64%
County results
Rickards
30–40%
40–50%
50–60%
Collins
30–40%
40–50%
No data
Governor before election
Joseph K. Toole
Democratic
Elected Governor
John E. Rickards
Republican

The 1892 Montana gubernatorial election was held on November 8, 1892.

Republican nominee John E. Rickards defeated Democratic nominee Timothy E. Collins and Populist nominee William Kennedy with 41.17% of the vote.

== General election ==
=== Candidates ===
Major party candidates

- Timothy E. Collins, Democratic, former member of the Montana territorial legislative assembly
- John E. Rickards, Republican, incumbent Lieutenant Governor of Montana

Other candidates

- William Kennedy, People's, newspaper editor
- J. M. Waters, Prohibition

=== Results ===
1892 Montana gubernatorial election
Party	Candidate	Votes	%	±%
Republican	John E. Rickards	18,187	41.17%	
Democratic	Timothy E. Collins	17,650	39.96%	
Populist	William Kennedy	7,794	17.64%	
Prohibition	J. M. Waters	543	1.23%	
Majority		537	1.21%	
Turnout		44,174	100.00%	
Republican gain from Democratic		Swing		

== Bibliography ==
- Glashan, Roy R. (1979). American Governors and Gubernatorial Elections, 1775-1978. Meckler Books. ISBN 0-930466-17-9.
- Gubernatorial Elections, 1787-1997. Washington, D.C.: Congressional Quarterly Inc. 1998. ISBN 1-56802-396-0.
- Dubin, Michael J. (2010). United States Gubernatorial Elections, 1861-1911. Jefferson, NC: McFarland & Co. ISBN 978-0-7864-4722-0.
