= 1904 Montana gubernatorial election =

- November 8, 1904
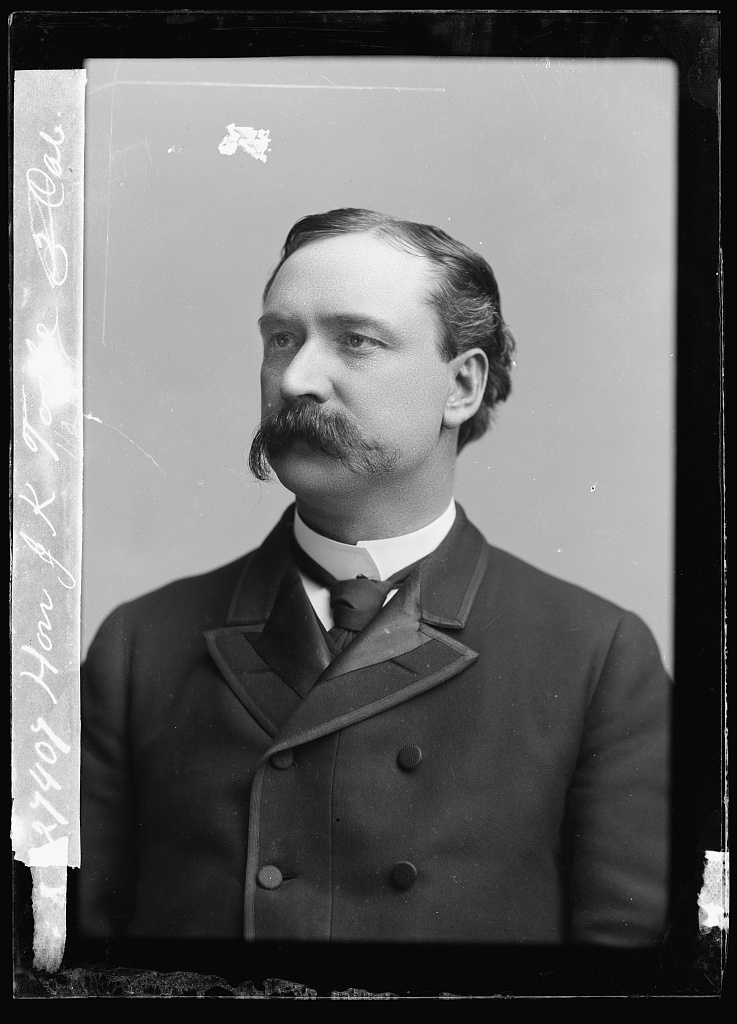

Nominee	Joseph Toole	William Lindsay	Malcolm G. O'Malley
Party	Democratic	Republican	Socialist
Popular vote	35,377	26,957	3,431
Percentage	53.79%	40.99%	5.22%
- County results Toole: 40–50% 50–60% 60–70% Lindsay: 40–50% 50–60% 60–70%
Governor before election
Joseph Toole
Democratic
Elected Governor
Joseph Toole
Democratic

The 1904 Montana gubernatorial election was held on November 8, 1904.

Incumbent Democratic Governor Joseph Toole was re-elected, defeating Republican nominee William Lindsay and Socialist nominee Malcolm G. O'Malley with 53.79% of the vote.

== General election ==
=== Candidates ===
- Joseph Toole, Democratic, incumbent governor
- William Lindsay, Republican, former state legislator, former chairman of the Republican state committee
- Malcolm G. O'Malley, Socialist, solicitor, former state legislator

=== Results ===
1904 Montana gubernatorial election
Party	Candidate	Votes	%	±%
Democratic	Joseph Toole	35,377	53.79%	
Republican	William Lindsay	26,957	40.99%	
Socialist	Malcolm G. O'Malley	3,431	5.22%	
Majority		8,420	12.80%	
Turnout		65,765		
Democratic hold		Swing		

== Bibliography ==
- Glashan, Roy R. (1979). American Governors and Gubernatorial Elections, 1775-1978. Meckler Books. ISBN 0-930466-17-9.
- Gubernatorial Elections, 1787-1997. Washington, D.C.: Congressional Quarterly Inc. 1998. ISBN 1-56802-396-0.
- Dubin, Michael J. (2010). United States Gubernatorial Elections, 1861-1911. Jefferson, NC: McFarland & Co. ISBN 978-0-7864-4722-0.
