= Warren Toole =

American judge (1893–1972)

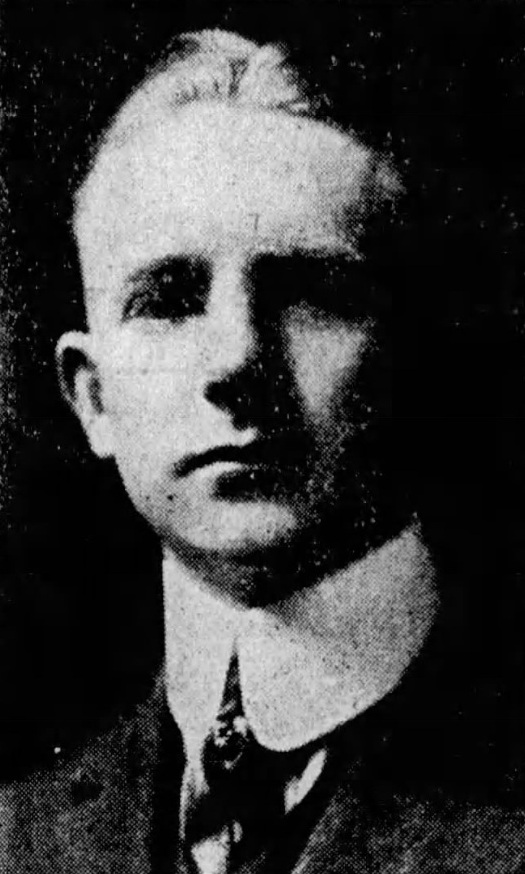
Warren Toole in 1926

Edwin Warren Toole (July 5, 1893 – March 8, 1972) was an American lawyer and public official in Montana. He held a variety of legal and governmental positions, including service in the Montana Legislature, as clerk of the United States District Court, United States probation officer for the state of Montana, and postmaster of Great Falls. He also briefly served as an associate justice of the Montana Supreme Court from 1926 to 1927.

== Early life, education, and military service ==
Born in Helena, Montana, Toole was the son of Joseph Toole, a three term Governor of Montana. Toole received a B.A. from Yale University in 1914, and a J.D. from Stanford in 1917. He gained admission to the Montana State Bar in 1917, and began the practice of law with the firm of Charles Nelson Pray and Llewellyn L. Callaway. His practice was interrupted by service in the United States Army in World War I; Toole "made four attempts to enlist, was rejected in each instance, but was finally drafted". He was discharged with the rank of lieutenant on December 31, 1918 and resumed his law practice.

== Judicial and political activities ==
In December 1926, Governor John E. Erickson appointed Toole to the Montana Supreme Court, to fill the last few weeks of the unexpired term of the deceased William L. Holloway. At age 33, Toole was the youngest person ever appointed to that body. Toole served from December 22, 1926, to January 3, 1927, and thereafter moved to Great Falls, Montana, and formed a legal partnership with former Governor Roy E. Ayers. He served as City Attorney for the City of Great Falls for seven years. He was elected as a Democrat to represent Cascade County, Montana in the Montana House of Representatives in 1940. In 1944, Toole was appointed postmaster of Great Falls by President Franklin D. Roosevelt. Toole was appointed Clerk of the Federal District Court in 1955 and served in that position until 1959, when Judge William Daniel Murray named him chief U.S. probate officer. Toole retired in 1965.

== Personal life and death ==
On March 30, 1918, Toole married Eulalie Barker, with whom he had one son and one daughter.

Toole died in his sleep in Great Falls, Montana, at the age of 78.

Political offices
Preceded by William L. Holloway	Justice of the Montana Supreme Court; 1926–1927	Succeeded by Henry L. Myers
