= Archibald E. Spriggs =

American politician (1866–1921)

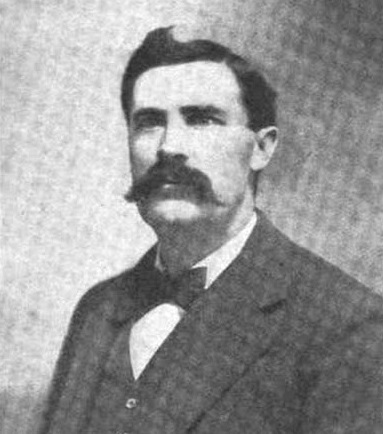

Lieutenant Governor of Montana
- In office 1897–1901
- Governor: Robert Burns Smith
- Preceded by: Alexander Campbell Botkin
- Succeeded by: Frank G. Higgins

Member of the Montana House of Representatives from the Meagher County district
- In office 1895–1896

Personal details
- Born: Archibald Everett Spriggs; December 2, 1866 Kansasville, Wisconsin
- Died: July 18, 1921 (aged 54)
- Resting place: Forestvale Cemetery, Helena, Montana
- Party: Populist
- Spouse: Josephine Marie Leighton (m. 1911–1921)

Archibald Everett Spriggs (December 2, 1866 – July 18, 1921) was an American politician and businessman. Affiliated with the People's Party, he served as the lieutenant governor of Montana from 1897 to 1901. After his political career, he embarked on a business career, mostly in the mining industry in Montana.

== Early life ==
Spriggs's father, Jabez (1838–1926), came to Wisconsin as a boy from Northamptonshire in England and became a farmer in Kansasville, in the Town of Dover, Racine County, Wisconsin. He and his wife Isabella had two children, Archibald and Harvey (1868–1959), who stayed on the family farm. Archibald Spriggs arrived in Montana in 1888 and taught school in the mining camp of Confederate Gulch for several years. He later became a store clerk in Townsend and then a store manager in nearby Winston.

== Political career ==
He served in the Montana House of Representatives from 1895 to 1896, representing Meagher County. A resident of Townsend, Spriggs lobbied for Broadwater County to be created from parts of Meagher and Jefferson counties, with Townsend as the county seat; this was done during Spriggs's term as lieutenant governor (1897–1901).

In May, 1900 William A. Clark was on the verge of being expelled from the U. S. Senate because of evidence that he had bribed the Montana legislature to appoint him. Spriggs, a friend of Clark, participated in an elaborate scheme to return Clark to the Senate. Governor Robert Burns Smith, an opponent of Clark, was lured out of the state to view a mining concession in California, and Spriggs made an unexpected return from a Populist convention, summoned by a telegram reading, "Weather fine, cattle doing well." Clark submitted a letter of resignation, leaving the senate seat empty, and Spriggs promptly reappointed him. However, the governor submitted a competing appointment of Martin Maginnis on his return, and the Senate refused to seat either man.

== Business career ==
After his term as lieutenant governor, Spriggs became a business manager for Montana businessman Henry Frank. He made several trips to France to negotiate a sale of some of Frank's mining interests. After Frank's death in 1908, Spriggs worked with New York politician and businessman William Sulzer, serving as president of his Alaska Industrial Company, which operated the "Jumbo" copper mine in Alaska. Spriggs and Sulzer used the connections he had acquired with French capitalists to try to obtain and exploit mining rights in Guatemala. Their Guatemala Mining and Development Company, backed by French capital, obtained broad rights from Guatemalan president Manuel Estrada Cabrera in 1911, but the project was halted by the advent of World War I.

Spriggs was also involved in Montana mines. He was a director for many years of the Boston & Alta Copper Company, which operated the Alta copper mine in Corbin. In 1920 he was the president of the Jib Mining Company, which reopened and worked gold mines near Basin, and also of the Montana Radersburg Mining Co., which owned additional claims in Broadwater County.

From 1915 until his death Spriggs served as the first chairman of the Industrial Accident Board established by the Montana Workmen's Compensation Act of 1915.

== Personal life ==
Spriggs married Josephine Marie (Leighton) Noble in 1911. She had been acquitted of murder in the death of her previous husband, Payton Noble, in 1905. After Spriggs' death, Josephine Spriggs ran for the Democratic nomination for Montana Secretary of State in 1924, coming in second.

Spriggs is buried in Forestvale Cemetery in Helena.
