= Florists' Review =

- Categories: trade magazine
- Frequency: monthly
- Founded: 1897
- Company: Florists' Review Enterprises, Inc.
- Country: United States
- Based in: Topeka, Kansas
- Language: English
- Website: floristsreview.com
- ISSN: 0015-4423

The Florists's Review is a monthly trade magazine for the retail and wholesale flower industries. It was founded in 1897 and is read in the United States and in over 80 other countries. The magazine is based in Topeka, Kansas and is published by Florists' Review Enterprises, Inc. The sister publication of the magazine is Super Floral Retailing.
