= John Henry Raap =

- Born: August 1, 1840; Lüdingworth, Kingdom of Hanover
- Died: April 23, 1897 (aged 56); Chicago, Illinois; United States
- Burial place: Graceland Cemetery
- Occupation: Liquor merchant/businessman

John Henry Raap (August 1, 1840 – April 23, 1897) was an entrepreneur and wholesale liquor retailer in Chicago in the 19th century.

== Early life and career ==
John Henry Raap was born August 1, 1840, in Lüdingworth, Kingdom of Hanover, to Ernst Raap and Catharina M. (Cords) Raap. The Raap family moved to America in 1854, settling in Chicago in a house on Cornell Street near Ashland Avenue. John Henry also had a sister named Minnie Dilcher. He had been confirmed in the German Lutheran Church, and remained an adherent of that faith. He learned to speak English fluently, and after arriving in Chicago he began working in a brick yard while attending a night school to prepare for a business career.

Raap's first business venture, in 1859 at the age of 18, was a grocery store at the corner of Pratt Street and Milwaukee Avenue. He opened this business with a capital of only $50, and sold out at a considerable profit at the end of two years. At the outbreak of the Civil War, Raap enlisted in the volunteer service in Company A, under Captain Molotzy, and was sent to Cairo with seventeen other companies; these were the first troops raised in Chicago. At the expiration of seven months from date of enlistment Raap was mustered out of service, in consequence of continued ill health.

He ran a general store for two years in the nearby town of Dunkel's Grove (now Addison, Illinois), and then disposed of this business and returned to the city in 1864 where he reopened in a frame building. He engaged in the flour and feed trade in this small building on Milwaukee Avenue, and when he opened his wholesale liquor house, he merged his smaller building into it. In 1870 he built his three-story brick buildings, known as Raap's block, a portion of which he occupied for his rapidly increasing business. Raap gradually extended his trade until he ranked among the most successful German businessmen in Chicago. After the block was completed, Raap successfully embarked in the saloon business, and in 1874 he became an importer and wholesale dealer in foreign and domestic wines and liquors. From 1873 to 1877, Raap was Captain of State Militia.

Raap had a physical altercation with his brother-in-law, policeman John H. Dilcher, on the sidewalk in front of his saloon; after beating him, Raap went back into the saloon, leaving Dilcher on the sidewalk. Dilcher went back inside the saloon with other police officers and arrested Raap without a warrant. Raap filed an action against the arresting officers seeking to recover damages for assault and battery and false imprisonment. The trial court held in his favor and the officers sought review with the Supreme Court of Illinois; in 1874, the court determined that the treatment of Raap by the officers corroborated his allegation that they were not acting in their official duty but were assisting Dilcher in an act of revenge, affirming the previous court judgment.

== Personal life ==
Raap's first wife was Sophia Sohle. In 1870, Raap owned real estate valued at $30,000, and his personal estate was worth $10,000. Sophia died September 3, 1871. Raap purchased a plot in Graceland Cemetery in 1872 and had the remains of his father and Sophia transferred there from Wunders Cemetery, and had his mother buried there when she died in 1878. Raap married his second wife, Helena Hannah Gilow of Grim, Prussia, on May 1, 1873. They had five children: John Henry, junior (also known as "Hank", b. May 1874), Tillie L. (b. May 1876), Robert R. (b. June 1879), Ernst E. (b. June 1884), and Pearl Frances (b. April 1893). The Raaps had three more children, a set of twins in 1878 and another child in 1882, who died as infants. In 1879, Raap had a three-story Second Empire mansion built in what was later known as Chicago's Wicker Park neighborhood; the mansion is now considered a landmark, and is one of the largest mansions in Wicker Park.

Raap was connected with many social orders and societies, including the Independent Order of Odd Fellows, the Sons of Hermann, the Central Turner Society, the Teutonia Maennerchor, and the Chicago Rebekah Society. He was a Republican with much influence in political affairs, although he never held any office.

== Death ==
G. H. Braunschweig, the collector and agent of Raap's company, had been indicted for embezzlement by a grand jury in March 1897. Raap wanted to bring up charges of embezzlement and forgery against his employee, who had threatened to kill himself if Raap pressed the charge against him. Raap claimed the defalcation was in the amount of $2,300, while Braunschweig claimed it was only $1,500 and that Raap owed him $400 salary.

At 5:45 on the morning of April 23, 1897, the date the case was to have been heard in court, Braunschweig began travelling back and forth between Raap's residence, the residence of Raap's attorney (Joseph O'Donnell, who had been prosecuting the case in court), and the wholesale liquor house on Milwaukee avenue, trying to arrange a meeting at Raap's office to avoid arrest and appearance in court. Braunschweig wanted to make a settlement, offering seven lots in Park Ridge valued at $1,000 and two lots in Kensington valued at $1,000; Raap refused to take these and insisted on having the cash, but was willing to take Braunschweig's home instead, which he was unwilling to give up. When Braunschweig arrived at Raap's home, he told the man's sons Robert (a driver for the liquor firm) and Henry (a member of the concern) that he was anxious to meet their father at his office; Raap believed that Braunschweig did not have the money, and instructed his sons to drive to the home of Deputy Sheriff Phillip Salomon and tell him to serve Braunschweig with a capias. Meanwhile, Braunschweig went to the home of O'Donnell and told him that a conference had been arranged with Raap at his office at 8 o'clock, and that he was wanted to close up the affair; as O'Donnell had no message from Raap, he declined to go.

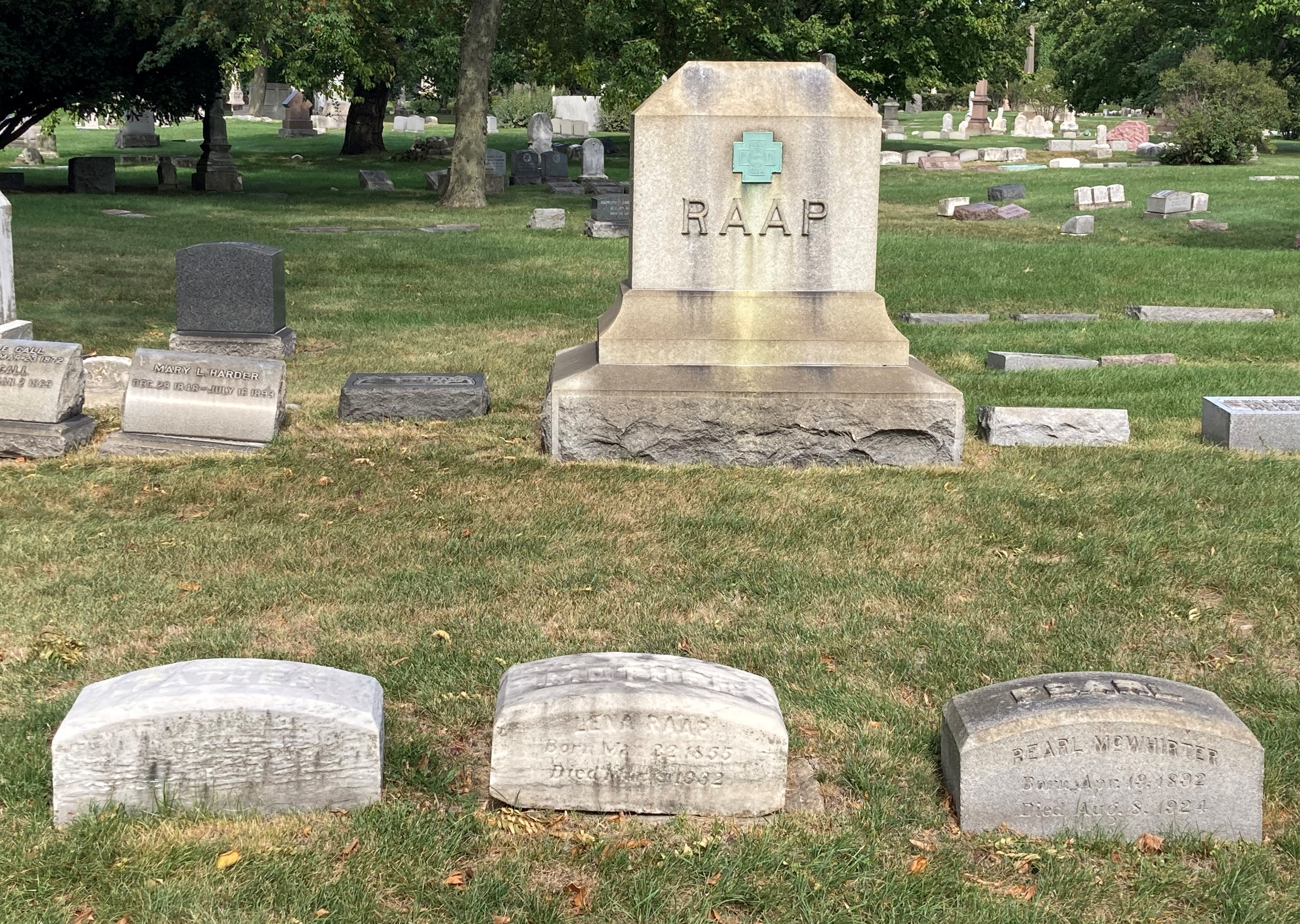
Raap's grave at Graceland Cemetery

When Braunschweig reached the liquor house office at 8 o'clock, Robert and Henry Raap and the company's rectifier Carl Pinnow were working inside, while J.H. Raap was busy in a rear room. Braunschweig requested Robert Raap to go to O'Donnell's office once more, but when he came back he had a reply from O'Donnell stating that if Braunschweig wanted to settle he could do so in court. At 8:45 o'clock, Deputy Salomon read the capias to Braunschweig, who asked for a moment to talk privately with his accuser, Raap, before he was placed under arrest. Braunschweig entered Raap's office, and as Raap crossed the threshold to his office, Braunschweig shot him in the head with a revolver. Raap fell over dead, and Braunschweig then fatally shot himself as well.

The homicide was ruled an intentional murder. Raap was buried in his family plot in Graceland Cemetery. John and Robert continued their father's business after his death.
