= Alexander Campbell Botkin =

American politician (1842-1905)

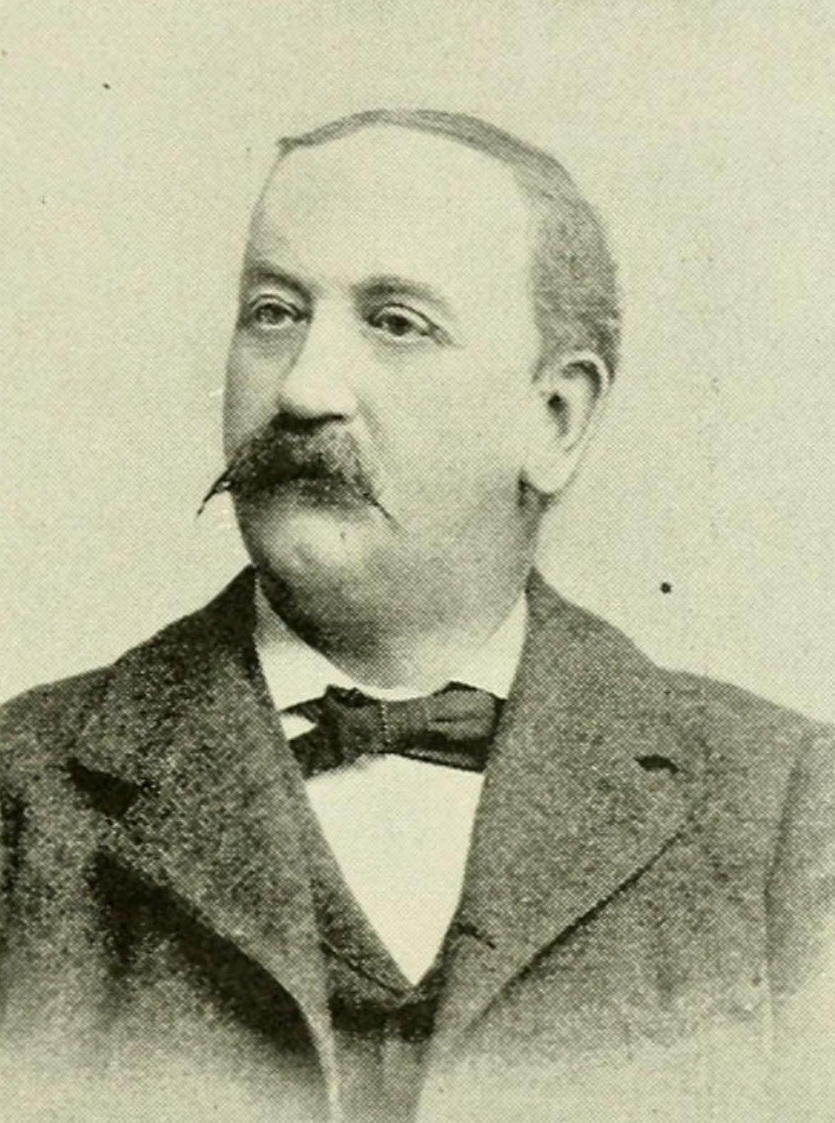
Alexander C. Botkin, lieutenant governor of Montana

Alexander Campbell Botkin (October 13, 1842 – November 1, 1905) was a United States politician from Montana.

== Biography ==
Botkin was born on October 13, 1842, in Madison, Wisconsin. He graduated from the University of Wisconsin with bachelor's and master's degrees (in 1859) and received his Bachelor of Laws from Albany Law School in 1866.

Botkin was a payroll clerk for the United States Army during the American Civil War (1862–1865). He practiced law, and was an editor of the Milwaukee Sentinel from 1868 to 1869, managing editor of the Chicago Times (1869–1874), and editor of the Milwaukee Sentinel (1874–1877). He married Harriet E. Sherman in 1872.

In 1878, President Rutherford Hayes appointed him United States marshal for the Montana Territory. In 1880, he lost the use of his legs as the result of an illness following exposure during a winter storm, and he used a wheelchair for the remainder of his life. He remained active in the law and politics, and continued to serve as a U.S. marshal until 1885. He served as a master in chancery for Montana's federal courts from 1889 to 1897, and Helena's city attorney from 1886 to 1890.

Botkin was elected lieutenant governor as a Republican in 1892 and served one term, 1893 to 1897. He was an unsuccessful candidate for governor in 1896.

In 1897, President William McKinley appointed Botkin to a commission tasked with revising the United States criminal and penal code. He eventually came chairman, and served until he died, in Washington, D.C.

Botkin died on November 1, 1905. He was buried at Forest Hill Cemetery in Madison, Wisconsin, where his father Alexander Botkin had served as a member of both houses of the Wisconsin State Legislature.

== See also ==
- Lieutenant Governor of Montana

Party political offices
Preceded by John E. Rickards	Republican nominee for Governor of Montana; 1896	Succeeded by David S. Folsom
Political offices
Preceded by John E. Rickards	Lieutenant Governor of Montana; 1893–1897	Succeeded by Archibald E. Spriggs
