= John E. Rickards =

American politician

John Ezra Rickards
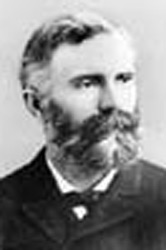

2nd Governor of Montana
- In office January 2, 1893 – January 3, 1897
- Lieutenant: Alexander C. Botkin
- Preceded by: Joseph Toole
- Succeeded by: Robert Smith

1st Lieutenant Governor of Montana
- In office 1889–1893
- Governor: Joseph Toole
- Preceded by: Position Established
- Succeeded by: Alexander Campbell Botkin

Personal details
- Born: July 23, 1848 Delaware City, Delaware
- Died: December 26, 1927 (aged 79) Berkeley, California
- Party: Republican
- Occupation: Bookkeeper

John Ezra Rickards (July 23, 1848 – December 26, 1927) was an American politician and bookkeeper. A Republican, he served as the first Lieutenant Governor of Montana, and the second Governor of the state of Montana.

== Biography ==
Rickards was born to David T. Rickards and his second wife, the former Mary Burris in Delaware City, Delaware and was educated in the public schools of his home state. His mother died when he was a young boy and for a time he Eliza lived and labored on an uncle's farm. In 1857, Rickards became a clerk in Philadelphia, Pennsylvania where his father was living with his third wife and their two daughters. The younger Rickards moved to Pueblo, Colorado in 1870 and was a clerk and a bookkeeper until 1873. He married Lizzie M. Wilson, born 19 April 1848 in Newark, Delaware, on 5 July 1876. The couple moved to California, and had three sons, Homer Crary (1877-1907), Earl Merritt (1878-1884), and Seward Adams (1880-1964). The family was living in Oakland by 1880. Lizzie died in San Francisco at the age of 33 on 18 May 1881. Rickards was a salesman in the mercantile business, and also involved in real estate, insurance and the oil industry. After Lizzie's death he moved to Butte, Montana in September 1882 and became a successful businessman in those fields. Rickards married Canadian-born Eliza Anne (Ellis) Boucher on 18 June 1883, in Ogden, Utah. She brought a daughter, Harriet Ellis Boucher, into the marriage. The Rickards then had five children: Howard Burris (1884-1952), Carlisle (1885-1958), "Baby" (1886), John Ezra (born and died in 1889), and Rachel (1891-1954). The Rickards were active lay leaders in the Methodist-Episcopal Church. After his stint as governor, Rickards, his wife, and five surviving children aged 9–24 moved back to Butte, Silver Bow County, Montana. By 1908, John, Eliza and Ellis were living in Berkeley, California. In 1914, the three were registered Progressives but 1916, they were once again registered Republicans.

== Career ==
Rickards was elected Alderman of Butte in 1885. He was a member of the territorial legislature from 1888 to 1889, and was a delegate to the state constitutional convention in 1889.

Rickards, a Republican, was elected as Montana's first lieutenant governor in 1888 at the same time that Joseph K. Toole, a Democrat, was chosen as Montana's first governor. He served from 1889 to 1893.

Rickards served as the second Governor of Montana from 1893 to 1897. While continuing to build Montana's infrastructure, he is credited for overseeing the creation of the state legal code and the state board of education, and an anti-gambling bill was sanctioned during his tenure.

After leaving office, Rickards moved to Berkeley, California and resumed his business career. Given an appointment to the Census Bureau in San Francisco, he was in that post for eighteen years.

== Death ==
Rickards died of angina pectoris and chronic myocarditis at his Berkeley, Alameda County, California home on 26 December 1927. His death certificate notes that he was retired from a special appointment to the U.S. Agricultural Secretary. His cremains are interred at Chapel of the Chimes in Oakland, California.

Party political offices
Preceded by Thomas C. Power	Republican nominee for Governor of Montana; 1892	Succeeded by Alexander C. Botkin
Political offices
Preceded by Vacant	Lieutenant Governor of Montana; 1889–1893	Succeeded by Alexander Campbell Botkin
Preceded by Joseph Toole	Governor of Montana; 1893-1897	Succeeded by Robert B. Smith
