= Joseph Toole =

American politician

Joseph Kemp Toole
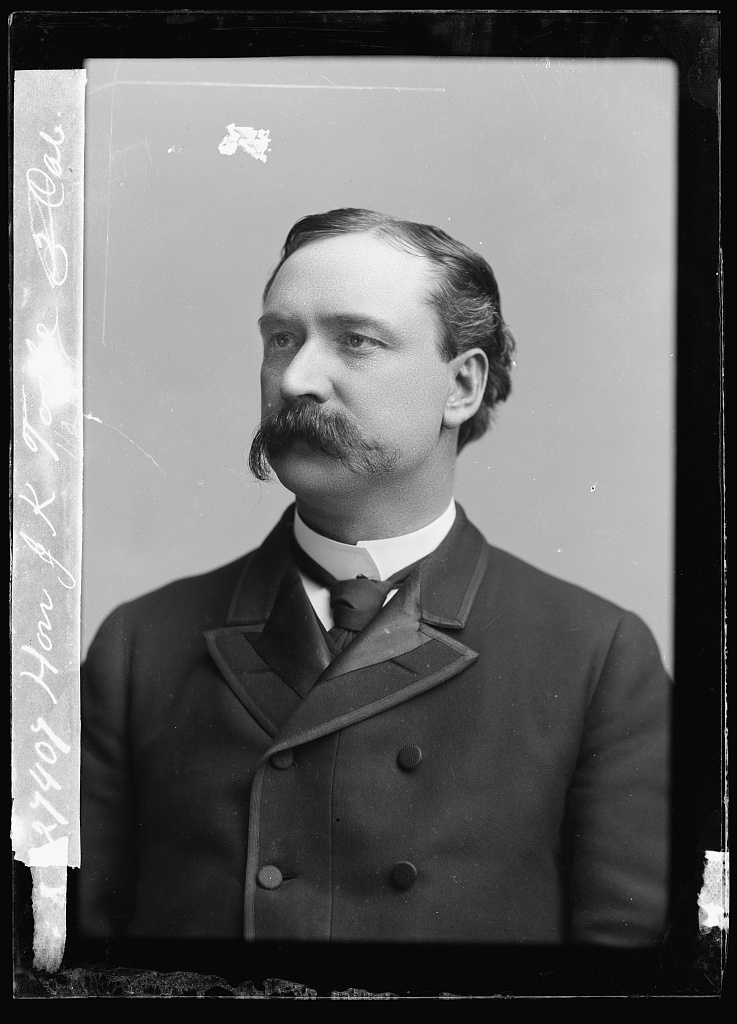

1st & 4th Governor of Montana
- In office November 8, 1889 – January 1, 1893
- Lieutenant: John Rickards
- Preceded by: Benjamin F. White as governor Montana Territory
- Succeeded by: John Rickards
- In office January 7, 1901 – April 1, 1908
- Lieutenant: Frank G. Higgins; Edwin L. Norris
- Preceded by: Robert Smith
- Succeeded by: Edwin Norris

Delegate to the U.S. House of Representatives from Montana Territory's at-large district
- In office March 4, 1885 – March 3, 1889
- Preceded by: Martin Maginnis
- Succeeded by: Thomas H. Carter

Personal details
- Born: May 12, 1851 Savannah, Missouri, U.S.
- Died: March 11, 1929 (aged 77) Helena, Montana, U.S.
- Party: Democratic
- Education: Western Military Institute, New Castle, Kentucky
- Occupation: Lawyer

Joseph Kemp Toole (May 12, 1851 – March 11, 1929) was a Democratic politician from Montana. He served as the first and fourth Governor of Montana.

== Biography ==
Toole was born in Savannah, Missouri and attended public school in St. Joseph, Missouri. In 1868, he graduated from the Western Military Institute in New Castle, Kentucky with honors. He moved to Helena, Montana in 1870; studied law and was admitted to the bar in 1871 and commenced practice in Helena. Toole was district attorney of the third judicial district of Montana (1872–1876), and a member of the Montana Territorial House of Representatives (1879–1881), and member and president of the Montana Territorial Council (1881–1883). He married Lily Rosecrans, daughter of General William Rosecrans, in 1890 and they had three children, including Warren Toole.

== Career ==
Toole was a delegate to the State Constitutional Convention at Helena in 1884 and 1889, and elected as a Democrat to the Forty-ninth and Fiftieth Congresses (March 4, 1885 – March 3, 1889); he did not seek renomination in 1888.

Toole was the first Governor of Montana (the only Democrat on the ticket that year to be elected), serving from November 8, 1889, until January 1, 1893. He resumed practice of law in Helena. Toole was a delegate to the Democratic National Conventions in 1892 and 1904.

He served as the fourth Governor of Montana from January 7, 1901, until April 1, 1908, when he resigned because of ill health. During his tenure, county treasurers were authorized to collect taxes on personal property, and there was legislation to ensure mine safety and mineworker protection.

== Death ==
During retirement, Toole divided his time between his home in Helena and San Francisco, California, until his death on March 11, 1929, at the age of 77. He is interred at Resurrection Cemetery in Helena, Montana.

Party political offices
First	Democratic nominee for Governor of Montana; 1889	Succeeded by Timothy E. Collins
Preceded by Robert Burns Smith	Democratic nominee for Governor of Montana; 1900, 1904	Succeeded by Edwin L. Norris
U.S. House of Representatives
Preceded by Martin Maginnis	Delegate to the U.S. House of Representatives from Montana Territory's at-large congressional district March 4, 1885 – March 3, 1889	Succeeded by Thomas H. Carter
Political offices
Preceded by Benjamin F. White	Governor of Montana; 1889–1893	Succeeded by John Rickards
Preceded by Robert B. Smith	Governor of Montana; 1901–1908	Succeeded by Edwin Norris
