= Robert Burns Smith =

American politician

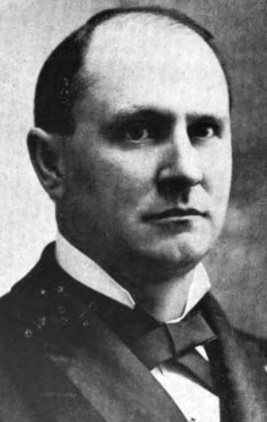
- Smith in 1907's Proceedings of the Annual Session of the Montana Horticultural Society. He served as the society's president in 1907–08.

3rd Governor of Montana
- In office January 4, 1897 – January 7, 1901
- Lieutenant: Archibald E. Spriggs
- Preceded by: John Rickards
- Succeeded by: Joseph Toole

Personal details
- Born: December 29, 1854 Hickman County, Kentucky, U.S.
- Died: November 16, 1908 (aged 53) Kalispell, Montana, U.S.
- Party: Democratic, Populist
- Occupation: Attorney, politician

Robert Burns Smith (December 29, 1854 – November 16, 1908) was a Democratic politician. He served as the third Governor of Montana from 1897 to 1901.

== Biography ==
Smith was born on a farm in Hickman County, Kentucky, and was educated in the local schools. At the age of twenty, he completed his education at the high school in Milburn, Kentucky, then taught in that school for one year. Moving to Charleston, Missouri in September 1876, he was elected principal of the Charleston Classical Academy until June 1877.

== Career ==
In June 1877, Smith began reading law in the office of Colonel Edward Crossland in Mayfield, Kentucky. In October, he was admitted to the bar in Mayfield and began practicing law. He married Catherine Crossland and they had two children.

Smith moved to Dillon, Montana and practiced law from September 1882 to 1889. Then he moved to Helena, Montana, and formed a law partnership with Samuel Word. He was a member of the 1884 State Constitution Convention, U. S. District Attorney from 1885 to 1889, and city attorney of Helena in 1890.

On the Democratic ticket through a coalition of democrats and populists, Smith won the election in November 1896, and served as Governor of Montana from 1897 to 1901. During his tenure, construction on the new state capital was initiated and roads were advanced. Under his governorship, the State University at Missoula, the State Agricultural College in Bozeman, and the Normal (Teacher) School in Dillon were created. When his term ended, he returned to his law practice in Butte.

== Death ==
Five years later failing health forced Smith to move to the east shore of Flathead Lake where he engaged in the orchard business. He died on November 16, 1908, and is interred at Conrad Memorial Cemetery, Kalispell, Flathead County, Montana.

Party political offices
Preceded by Timothy E. Collins	Democratic nominee for Governor of Montana; 1896	Succeeded by Joseph Toole
Preceded by William Kennedy	Populist nominee for Governor of Montana; 1896	Succeeded by None
Political offices
Preceded by John E. Rickards	Governor of Montana; 1897-1901	Succeeded by Joseph Toole
