= Petroleum Building (Midland) =

T.S. Hogan Petroleum Building
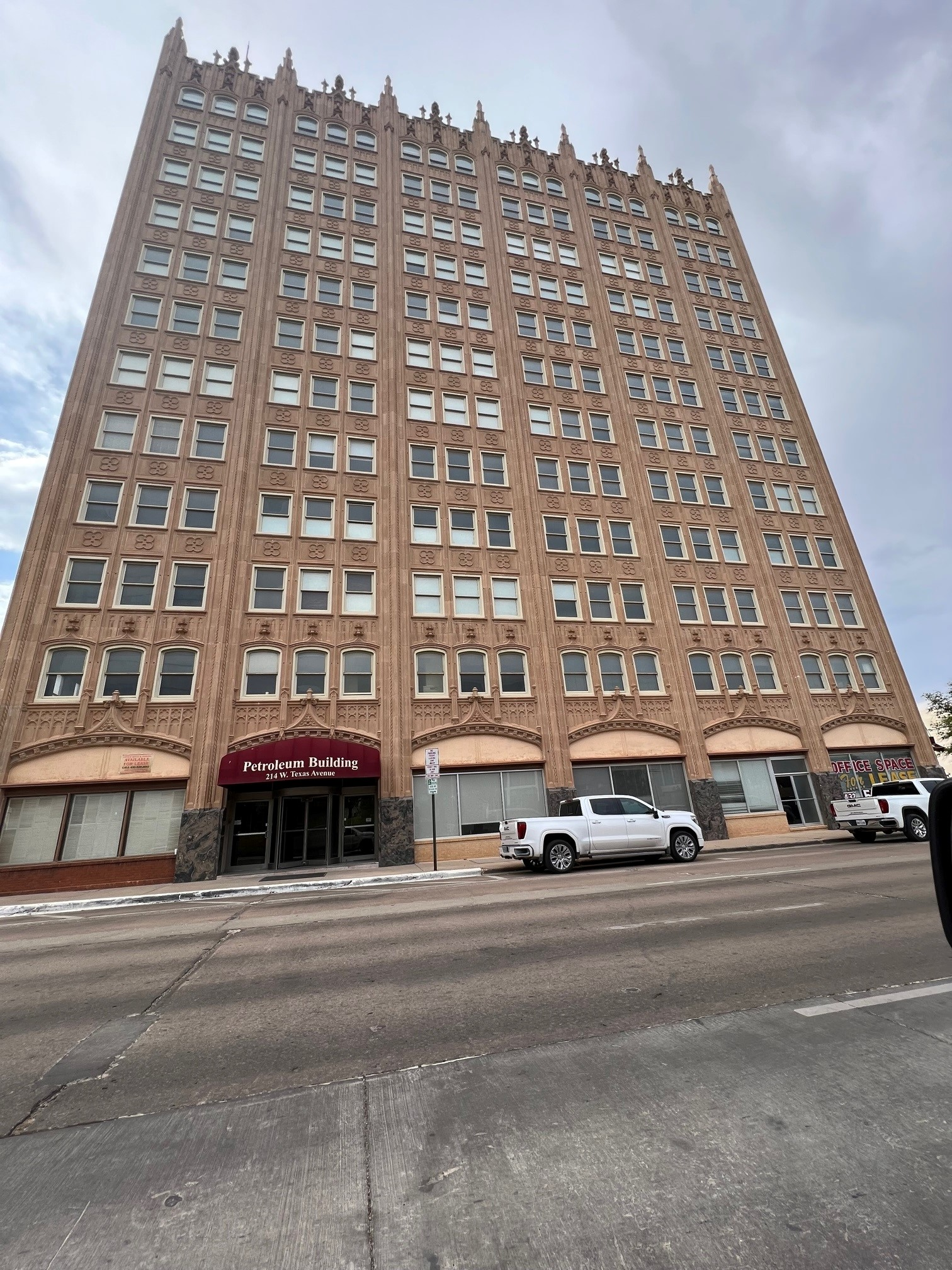
- T.S. Hogan Petroleum Building
- Interactive map of the T.S. Hogan Petroleum Building area

General information
- Status: Completed
- Type: Office space
- Location: 214 W. Texas Ave. Midland
- Coordinates: 31.998679°N 102.075988°W
- Construction started: 1928
- Completed: 1928
- Opening: 1929

Height
- Antenna spire: 151 ft (46 m)
- Roof: 137 ft (42 m)
- Top floor: 12

Technical details
- Floor count: 12
- Floor area: 5,788 sq ft (537.7 m^{2})
- Lifts/elevators: 3

Design and construction
- Architect: Wyatt C. Hendrick
- Developer: T. S. Hogan

Recorded Texas Historic Landmark
- Designated: 1982
- Reference no.: 4002

The Petroleum Building (formerly known as the Hogan Building) is a highrise in downtown Midland, TX.

The building was built in 1928 and consists of 12 floors with a neo-gothic facade. The building stands at 137 ft but with its spires reaches a height of 151 ft. The Hogan building is a registered, Texas historical landmark. The tower is named for lawyer and oil entrepreneur Thomas Stephen Hogan.

The design of the Petroleum Building, like the Woolworth Building in New York City and the demolished Baum Building in Oklahoma City, utilizes many classic architectural devices. Gothic spires and Moorish arches, lavish carved surfaces and opulent marble, all intended to clothe the business house with the respectability of a cathedral. The architect was Wyatt C. Hedrick.

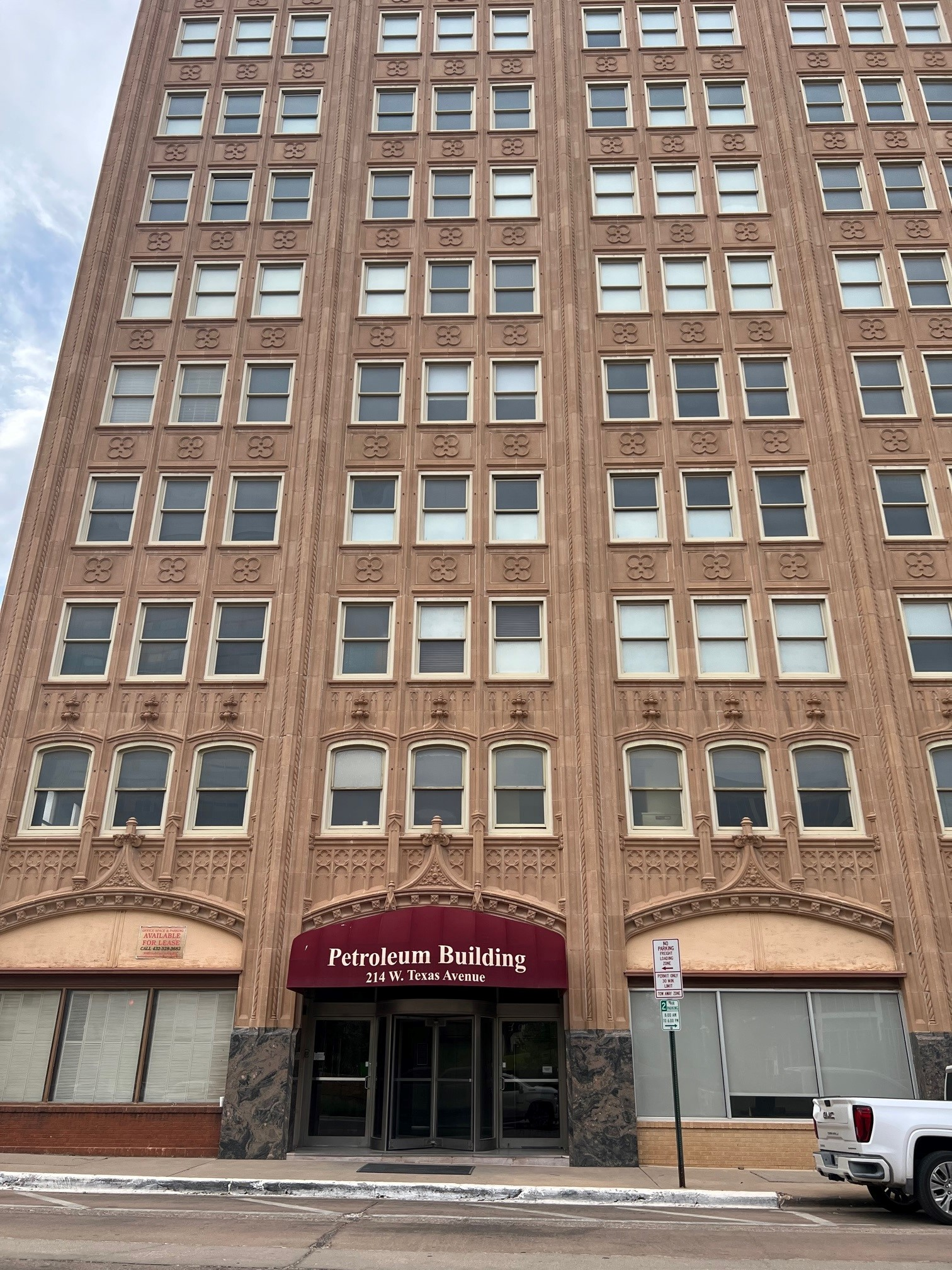
Entrance to the Petroleum Building in Midland, TX
