= Kate Daniels (book series) =

Series of fantasy novels by Ilona Andrews

- Cover of Small Magics by Ilona Andrews, art by Luisa Preissler
- Magic Bites (2007); Magic Burns (2008); Magic Strikes (2009); Magic Bleeds (2010); Magic Slays (2011); Magic Rises (2013); Magic Breaks (2014); Magic Shifts (2015); Magic Binds (2016); Magic Triumphs (2018)
- Author: Ilona Andrews
- Country: United States
- Language: English
- Discipline: Urban fantasy; Paranormal romance
- Website: Kate Daniels on ilona-andrews.com

Kate Daniels is an urban fantasy series written by the husband-wife duo Ilona Andrews. The first ten books were published under the Ace Books imprint of Penguin Random House between 2007 and 2018, with many appearing on the New York Times Best Seller list. The series has since been expanded upon in a number of self-published series, primarily from the point of view of supporting characters in the original ten books.

The series's heroine, Kate, is a gifted swordswoman who has been groomed from childhood to kill. She is unusual in her world, where magic has returned and alternates in apocalyptic waves with technology, in that she is able to survive on her own; however, through the series we see that she cares deeply about the people around her. Ultimately she would rather use her strength to protect them rather than to enshrine or - more likely - destroy herself.

== Setting ==
The series takes place in a future alternate history, magic-imbued world, set primarily in Atlanta. In this world, magic had once dominated ancient civilization, but waned to nothing as technology advanced, until one day it returned: the burgeoning internet died, planes fell from the sky, and people transformed into beasts. Three decades into this apocalypse, magic and technology continue to fight it out in waves. Cities and roads have crumbled as magic eats away at steel and concrete. Atlanta landmarks are depicted as collapsed and overgrown, as nature is supercharged by the magic waves. Humans have adapted by returning to newspapers, horse-and-cart, and seeking safety in numbers.

Ilona Gordon discussed their inspiration for the world's magic apocalypse in an interview with author Nalini Singh:

There are so many stories where the magic is going out of the world. Tolkien's work, for example, explores that theme. And it always made me so sad to read about it. I mean, we yearn for magic. Look at the film industry – we basically use cutting edge technology to create magic on screen. It's an integral part of being human: to want a touch of something mystical and unexplained. It seemed natural to bring about "reverse" apocalypse: magic is back with a vengeance.

The literary scholar Stefan Ekman likens the introduction of supernatural elements in the Kate Daniels world to the novum in science fiction: society is instantly and irrevocably changed, providing the authors with a means of examining how their characters react to social upheaval. Within Kate's world, humans have splintered into many factions, primarily based on the group's magic status and type of magic, creating opportunities for conflict that play out from many angles throughout the series.

World mythology figures heavily as inspiration for plot lines, antagonists and other side characters. Belief powers the magic system, because that is the opposite of technology, which does not require that its users believe in it. Therefore, when enough people believe in a god or other mythical figure, that figure can become reality within the books' world.

The magical creatures depicted in the world are primarily shapeshifters and vampires, though fae also exist. Mythical gods and demigods appear as well, though gods generally cannot manifest outside of a flare, an intense magic wave that happens every 7 years.

Shapeshifter society is hierarchical and militaristic. The shift itself is a hormonal process; if a shapeshifter does not live a life of discipline and resist the pull of the "wild", they risk going loup, a state that traps them between human and beast. Loups are driven mad by their impulses and murder indiscriminately in an attempt to satisfy their hunger.

Vampires in the series are closer to zombies than in broader contemporary culture; the authors have said that they don't find vampires sexy; they describe their version as more similar to Nosferatu. In the Kate Daniels world, dying people will sell their bodies to the People, an organization devoted to the study and deployment of the dead; the People turn the person's body into a vampire via a virus, then pilot the vampire via necromancy. The body gradually transforms, becoming desiccated and adapting to move on all fours. An unpiloted vampire is extremely dangerous; its bloodlust will drive it to kill.

== Works: Kate Daniels (2007–2018) ==
The original series follows Kate Daniels, an irreverent and impulsive swordswoman, mercilessly trained from childhood by her adoptive father to operate as a lone wolf, cutting down her opponents without hesitation. Kate has been raised with one goal: to kill her birth father, the ancient, powerful wizard Roland.

She supports herself as a for-hire mercenary, living paycheck-to-paycheck in purposeful obscurity in Savannah, GA, until her former guardian is murdered in Atlanta. As she finds herself pulled deeper into the politics of shapeshifters, necromancers, witch covens and law enforcement organizations that hold power in the city, she must come to terms with her upbringing, and that it is ultimately up to her to define her life's purpose.

=== Publishing History ===
No.	Title	Date	Length	ISBN
1	Magic Bites	March 27, 2007	353 pages	978-1101041970
2	Magic Burns	April 1, 2008	260 pages	978-1101128572
3	Magic Strikes	March 31, 2009	322 pages	978-1101028797
4	Magic Bleeds	May 25, 2010	386 pages	978-1101187760
5	Magic Slays	May 31, 2011	322 pages	978-1101515259
6	Magic Rises	July 30, 2013	370 pages	978-1101624876
7	Magic Breaks	July 29, 2014	418 pages	978-0698146402
8	Magic Shifts	August 4, 2015	352 pages	978-0698136779
9	Magic Binds	September 20, 2016	333 pages	978-0698136786
10	Magic Triumphs	August 28, 2018	335 pages	978-0698136823

Ilona Gordon began writing what would become Magic Bites when she returned to writing as a hobby after the births of her two children. Her husband, Gordon, helped her rework a discarded submissions into Lost Dog, which was bought by Ace Books, and published in 2007 under the joint pen name, "Ilona Andrews".

The series had been intended to include seven books; however, while editing and receiving beta reader feedback on Magic Rises, book six, it became clear to the Andrews that the remaining story could not be adequately resolved in one book. Additionally, they were receiving comments from fans who were not satisfied with the resolution of the recently completed (in December 2012) The Edge series.

They approached Ace about extending the series, and in early 2013 signed a deal for three additional books, bringing the series length to ten volumes. The seventh book, Magic Breaks, was written as originally intended. The additional three books serve as an extension of the planned storyline.

=== Plot ===
==== Magic Bites ====
Kate Daniels's former guardian is murdered; she risks raising her profile in exchange for vengeance. Together with Curran, the Beast Lord of Atlanta, and Nick, a member of the Order of Merciful Aid, she kills the perpetrator. Impressed by her performance, she is hired by the Order.

==== Magic Burns ====
Kate is hired by the Pack to investigate a vanishing crossbowman. She encounters a street kid, Julie, who hires Kate to find her missing mother.

Kate learns that the crossbowman, Bran, is the Hound of the goddess Morrigan, able to disappear into her mist. He is working to prevent an invasion of Atlanta by the sea demon Bolgor the Shepherd and the formorians, who have made a deal with Morfran. Bolgor is after a necklace, which Kate leaves in the Pack's care. Julie is taken by Bolgor, who negotiates with Curran to trade the necklace for her. It's a trap; Curran loses Julie and, with the necklace, Morfran gains the power he needs to manifest along with his followers.

Kate, the Pack, Bran, the People, and the witch covens come together to face the invading force. Bran retrieves Julie, who has seen her mother murdered by the fomorians, but he dies on the battlefield. The Atlanta force is victorious, and Kate takes the orphaned Julie in as her ward.

==== Magic Strikes ====
Kate's werewolf friend Derek is in a coma after a brutal attack; the healing magic of his shift has not kicked in. Jim, the Pack's security chief, had assigned him a forbidden mission: infiltrate the Midnight Games, an underground gladiatorial tournament. He and his crew are in hiding from Curran because participation is illegal.

Kate discovers that Derek was attacked by the Reapers, a team in the games who are rakshasas, shape-shifting demons. They prevent their shift to maintain their cover as humans via stolen shards of the Wolf Diamond, the top prize in the Games. Shards are found in Derek and removed; he recovers. Recognizing the threat of the stone to the Pack, Kate and Jim's crew form a team to enter the Games. Enraged, Curran finds them and, shocking them all, joins their team.

They make it to the last round of the Games against the Reapers, who now have an unbeatable weapon: a sword made by the sorcerer Roland, who is secretly Kate's father, given to them by Hugh D'Ambray, Roland's warlord. The sword can only be destroyed by their shared blood, so Kate sacrifices herself on it, realizing that she is revealing her identity to Hugh. Recognizing they've lost, the Reapers escape with Kate, demanding the Wolf Diamond as they go. Curran and the Pack track them, rescuing Kate and recovering the stone. After she recovers, Kate and Curran arrange a dinner date.

==== Magic Bleeds ====
Kate investigates a bar fight where a man has been killed, his body infected with a strange, nearly-sentient virus. A second follows; both victims are shapeshifters, who are normally resistant to infection. Kate must cooperate with the Pack, which is awkward after Curran had stood her up for their date. After a public confrontation, they resolve their differences and sleep together. In the morning, he demands she move in with him at the Pack's keep; she refuses and he leaves, unwilling to compromise.

Kate learns that behind the attacks is Erra: plague-bringer, Roland's sister and therefore her aunt. Erra pursues Kate relentlessly, including targeting the Pack after figuring out Kate's relationship with Curran. Recognizing that she is now a risk to his people, Kate agrees to return to the Keep with him. She admits to him that Roland is her father, which will always make her a target. He tells her that his family was murdered, and that he built the Pack and the Keep to keep his future family safe.

United, they prepare for battle with Erra. She is a greater threat to men and shapeshifters; Kate warns Curran to stay out of the fight. Curran jumps in anyway and is stunned by Erra's magic, turning wild. Kate kills Erra and passes out; she wakes in a cage with Curran, who has carried her back to the Keep. He falls into a coma; Kate refuses to leave his side. She is forced to defend her position as consort, killing dozens of shapeshifters when they challenge her. Curran finally wakes, his humanity restored and feeling betrayed that the Pack hadn't supported Kate, his chosen mate.

==== Magic Slays ====
Kate - who, after quitting the Order, has started her own private investigation firm - is hired to investigate the kidnapping of an inventor and the theft of his top-secret work. It comes out that his device removes magic from its surroundings; it will incidentally kill any magic users in its range. The device has been stolen by a gang of human-supremacists, the Lighthouse Keepers.

The Keepers have activated their sleeper agents, including an elite Pack combatant; she attacks Kate's office, biting and turning Julie. Her shift fails; she is put in a coma, but is doomed to go loup and will need to be euthanized. The Keepers set off a device in a market, killing everyone. Kate and the shapeshifters capture them as they are transporting the device out, and learn there is a second, larger device that could reach all of Atlanta. With the used device in hand, Kate theorizes she can channel its concentrated magic to cleanse Julie's blood with her own.

The entirety of Atlanta's magic community unites to find the Lighthouse Keepers. The volhvs had captured the inventor before the Keepers could; he provides instructions to disarm the device. The coalition tracks down the Keepers and attacks their compound, killing everyone; Kate deactivates the second device. Some days later, Kate performs the ritual on Julie, cleansing her of the shapeshifter virus. This comes with a terrible cost: Julie is now bound to Kate and cannot disobey her.

==== Magic Rises ====
Kate and Curran are trapped by Hugh d'Ambray, Roland's warlord, in their quest to secure panacea, an herbal treatment used to prevent shapeshifters from going loup. They barely escape without the panacea. Kate is despondent, until Christopher, who she had rescued from Hugh's prison, reveals he knows the ultra-secret recipe.

==== Magic Breaks ====
Hugh appears in Atlanta having framed a shapeshifter for the murder of a Master of the Dead. Kate, leading the pack while Curran is away, must turn over the perpetrator or the People will declare war. Kate decides to hand the accused over to local law enforcement. At the exchange, Hugh sets a trap for Kate; Ghastek, the local leader of the People, is accidentally tagged as well. Curran returns just as Kate and Ghastek are magically transported to a well prison.

Hugh lets them starve, but Kate remains confident that Curran will find her. He does with the help of Christopher, who was once Roland's Legatus, the top leader of the People. After days of navigating the maze-like prison, they enter a cavern filled with powerful magic. Kate discovers it is the grave of her grandmother, Semiramis, who allows the group to pass. Outside, Hugh is blocking the bridge out and they are overrun by unpiloted vampires. They escape because Christopher and the Rat Alpha, Robert, sacrifice themselves.

Overnight Kate is approached by the current Legatus. He offers her Christopher and Robert, who had been saved by Roland, if she is able to walk out with them. At Roland's palace, Kate is challenged to display her strength. She resists the urge to kill Roland and leaves with her people. When they return to Atlanta, Roland attacks, attempting to claim the city. Kate rebuffs him, claiming it herself. The next night, Roland walks into their quarters, having enchanted the Keep's security: he will allow Kate to keep Atlanta, but she cannot remain Consort. Roland leaves and Curran tells her he will step down as Beast Lord.

==== Magic Shifts ====
Eduardo, the mate of Curran's foster sister, George, has disappeared. Kate and Curran track Eduardo's car; they can see he was magically transported elsewhere. Later, Kate visits the Mercenary Guild and finds a giant attacking. She notices it is wearing a jewel, but after it's dead, the jewel is gone; she suspects another merc, Lago, of stealing it. Suddenly Kate is overcome and passes out. She wakes in the med ward, profoundly disabled from a stroke. She recovers quickly due to risky med magic, however, she has blacked out on everything after the giant died, including the missing jewel.

Kate refocuses on the hunt for Eduardo. The magic at the scene of his car and of the giant were both bronze, which indicates a djinn. Lago, under the influence of the djinn, kidnaps Rowena, a Master of the Dead. After a chase, Lago loses control of his car and emerges a giant. Kate sees the jewel pierced to his skin and remembers he took it. She kills the giant. Nick, now the Knight Protector of the Order, arrives at the scene, claiming jurisdiction. He takes the jewel back to the Order, ignoring Kate's warnings.

When she returns home, Nick is there - the jewel is gone, stolen by the expert called in to examine it. There is a knock on the door: it is Bahir, Eduardo's estranged father. The djinn, Shakush, has a vendetta against their family; Bahir knows how to capture him. After killing Shakush's latest victim, they face the challenge of the jewel: the enchanted box that will trap it cannot be moved. Kate and Curran carry the jewel step by step, tempted by the djinn. George takes the last steps, and Eduardo slams the lid of the vessel shut; it disappears, absorbed into the earth.

==== Magic Binds ====
Roland kidnaps Saiman, local businessman and demigod, refusing to negotiate for his return. Meanwhile, Kate and Curran are planning their wedding. The Witch Oracle presents her with a vision: if she marries Curran, he will die by Roland's hand. If she doesn't marry Curran, he and their son will die. The pivotal battle can happen in as soon as two weeks. Kate devises a plan: she will obtain a flying horse and return to Roland's prison, Mishmar. While Roland is distracted, Curran will rescue Saiman.

Kate departs for Mishmar. She returns to her grandmother's grave, presenting her with the remains of Erra, summoning her spirit. Erra agrees to help as long as Kate abandons her claim to Atlanta once Roland is dealt with. Back in Atlanta, Curran has rescued Saiman. Kate visits her best friend Andrea and her newborn. Jezebel, her longtime friend and advisor, attacks; she is an agent of Roland. She misses the baby, instead critically injuring Dali, Jim's Consort.

The next day, Kate and Curran receive word that Jim, seeking revenge, has destroyed Roland's base outside of Atlanta; it is effectively a declaration of war. Erra helps them devise a strategy and Ghastek swears himself as Kate's Legatus. Five days later, they prepare to face Roland at the Keep. Having dismissed Hugh for imprisoning Kate, Roland defaults to primitive battle tactics; Kate's forces overcome his with ease. He transports himself from the battlefield before Kate can reach him.

Kate and Curran marry as planned. Two weeks later, she learns she is pregnant.

==== Magic Triumphs ====
Kate, now a mother, faces a new threat to herself and Atlanta. In dealing with it, she must collaborate with her father. He turns on her, but she manages to capture him in a pocket realm, securing the permanent safety of herself and her family from his schemes.

=== Side novel and novellas ===
No.	Title	First Published	First appeared in	ISBN
3.5	Magic Mourns	September 7, 2010	Must Love Hellhounds	978-0425236338
4.5	Magic Dreams	June 7, 2011	Hexed	978-0425241769
5.5	Gunmetal Magic	July 31, 2012	-	978-1-101-58519-1
A full-length novel from the perspective of Andrea Nash. After Andrea is dismissed from the Order of the Knights of Merciful Aid for being a shapeshifter, Kate hires her.
5.6	Magic Gifts	July 31, 2012	Gunmetal Magic	978-1101592557
6.5	Magic Steals	November 25, 2014	Night Shift	978-0425273920
8.5	Magic Stars	December 8, 2015	-	978-1519762337
Derek and Julie investigate the murder of a family; the killers' target was a mysterious, glowing stone. The warlock who ordered the hit sets a series of traps for them; they neutralize them and pursue the warlock, who now possesses the stone. He reveals it is actually a fallen star, a letavitsa, a slavic succubus. Derek does not resist the succubus; however, it cannot take him because his heart belongs to someone. Julie kills the warlock with magic, the first time she has used her powers since being imbued with Kate's blood. Severely weakened after silver poisoning, blood loss, and the letavitsa, Derek passes out. Julie stays with him, stealing a kiss when she is sure he is asleep.

=== Short story collections ===
- Small Magics, NYLA, September 17, 2015
- Curran POV Collection, ilona-andrews.com, July 21, 2010

== Works: Kate Daniels Universe ==
=== The Iron Covenant (2018- ) ===
The Iron Covenant is a paranormal romance series, planned as a duology. It follows Hugh d'Ambray, a villain first introduced in Magic Strikes, after he is exiled by his master, Roland. It takes place between the events of Magic Binds and Magic Triumphs.

==== Plot ====
In Iron and Magic (book 1), Hugh enters into an agreement with Elara, the White Warlock, whose people inhabit a castle in Kentucky that needs defending. They marry in a ploy to convince their enemies of their commitment, since both parties have a reputation for turning on allies. Hugh and Elara's relationship is combative and contemptuous; they struggle to trust each other.

A nearby trading post is massacred, and then another. Elara's seers foresee that a much larger community, Aberdine, is the next target. Hugh leads a combination of his and Elara's forces, defeating a seemingly unbeatable, magically-imbued army. While Hugh is away, Landon Nez, Roland's Legatus, approaches Elara with a bargain: turn on Hugh or he will attack.

Elara tells Hugh of the visit and they prepare for siege. Hugh is captured by Landon in their battle and imprisoned. There, he is approached by Roland with an invitation to return; Hugh denies him. Unwilling to abandon him, Elara manifests the most secret part of her magic, rescuing Hugh from Roland's wrath. In spite of their success, and though each is attracted to the other, they continue to hold each other at arm's length.

==== Development and Publication History ====
No.	Title	Date	Length	ISBN
1	Iron and Magic	June 26, 2018	394 pages	978-1641970358
2	TBA	TBA		

As an April Fool's joke in 2015, the authors shared a cover and blurb for a fake romance novel starring the charismatic villain Hugh d'Ambray. Readers were enthusiastic about the idea and encouraged the duo to make the story a reality.

They had originally written the character as unredeemable; responding to the positive response the next day, Ilona said of the idea: "it would have to be a novel length because redeeming Hugh enough to give him an HEA is a huge challenge."

Gordon described the process in an interview:

It started as an April fool's joke, but I remember exactly what we were doing when we started talking about how we could really make a book out of it [...] we decided to walk down to a little breakfast place and have coffee. So we sat outside the shop, drank coffee, ate kolaches, and plotted it out. While it started as a joke, people seemed open to the idea and we were excited to write it. It's very much Hugh's book, but Elara has a big part, and we do see things from her point of view.

Iron and Magic was announced on their blog April 1, 2018. The book was released June 26, 2018, self-published by the authors with NYLA.

The series is planned as a duology. In January 2025, the Andrews began to post snippets of the second book on their blog. However, as the story became more complex, they announced the serialization would not continue so they could prioritize editing. As of late 2025, they had not yet announced a publication date for the second book; earlier that same year, they shared they were "contractually obligated" to produce the novel, as they had sold the print rights to the sequel along with Iron and Magic to their French publisher.

Iron and Magic was published as a special edition by Arcane Society in 2024. It features cover art by Luisa Preissler.

=== Kate Daniels World/Aurelia Ryder (2020- ) ===
Aurelia Ryder is an urban fantasy series, planned as a duology, that follows Julie after she leaves Atlanta.

==== Plot ====
In the prologue set four years after Magic Triumphs, "The King of Fire", the witch oracle of Atlanta has shared a prophecy with Julie: Moloch will kill Kate, her adoptive mother. Moloch can only be killed by one who shares his power. Julie attacks Moloch, losing an eye but taking one of his, making her the one destined to kill him.

It is explained in backstory that she was close to death after absorbing Moloch's eye. Erra escaped with her into a deep sleep for nine months, which they experienced as four years. During this time, Julie underwent a complete physical transformation and was trained as a Princess of Shinar by Erra. When she awoke, she renamed herself "Aurelia Ryder".

In Blood Heir, eight year after leaving Atlanta, Julie returns under the deep cover of her new identity. She struggles to maintain her anonymity while attempting to solve a series of murders in the company of old friends; particularly Derek, her former collaborator and crush, who has gone through his own transformation: he is now the Beta of Alaska's Ice Fury and seems to possess divine, healing magic.

Together, Julie and Derek track down the perpetrator, a sphinx. Derek kills the sphinx then turns on Julie, revealing that he had recognized her immediately and confronting her for leaving him in Atlanta without a goodbye. They fight, both blinded by their anger at the other. Derek eats the heart of the sphinx, which shows him his future, and leaves.

==== Development and Publication History ====
The authors first hinted at Julie's future in 2018 when they shared "The King of Fire" on their blog.

In an interview with the Houston Chronicle, Ilona shared that the motivation to complete a Julie novel came about in the early days of the COVID-19 pandemic: "When COVID hit, I had to unplug and turn off email a little bit [...] The slog of grief and anxiety and death was so heavy. But we started getting emails, people whose parents had died or people who were sick and scared, asking if we'd post some little thing."

In June 2020 they began sharing a serialized work titled "Ryder" on their blog; it was later edited for self-publication and released as Blood Heir on January 12, 2021. The novel climbed to #5 on the New York Times Best Seller list and #2 on USA Today's Best-selling Booklist, in spite of its print on demand release strategy.

A follow-up novel is planned but as of early 2026 has not been announced.

No.	Title	Date	Length	ISBN
1	Blood Heir	January 12, 2021	364 pages	978-1641971584
2	TBA	TBA		

- The short story "Sandra" is told from Kate's point of view, giving her reaction to Julie's return to Atlanta. It takes place concurrently to Blood Heir.

Blood Heir was published as a special edition by Arcane Society in 2024. The edition includes the Julie and Derek novella Magic Stars and the short story "The King of Fire", and features cover art by Luisa Preissler.

=== Wilmington Years (2023- ) ===
Seven years after the events of Magic Triumphs, Kate and Curran relocate with their son to Wilmington, North Carolina in the hopes of giving Conlan a childhood separate from their legacies in Atlanta. The stories provide a slice-of-life from Kate and Curran's settled, post-Roland life, with lower stakes than the original series.

The series is planned as a trilogy and is set before Blood Heir.

==== Plot ====
In Magic Tides, Kate and her family are embracing a hard-won peace in Wilmington, NC, until Kate learns that a neighbor's son has been kidnapped, likely because he is a mermaid. She travels across Wilmington looking for the boy, finally recovering him and others like him from a corrupted Knight of the Order who made a deal with the sea god Manannán.

In Magic Claims, Kate and Curran are grappling with the fact that their new life leaves them isolated and vulnerable when they're recruited to face a mysterious, aggressive threat in the woods by the town of Penderton. The payment is a large expanse of forest, the ideal spot for a new Pack. They confront the threat in the forest, a prehistoric fae queen, and take her fortress, finding riches inside. Now with everything they need to truly protect themselves, they vow to establish a sanctuary for anyone who needs it, not just shapeshifters.

==== Development and Publication History ====
The authors developed and wrote the first book, Magic Tides, in secret, including from their literary agent who handles the release of their self-published works. They first publicly announced the novella on December 12, 2022, five weeks before its release.

They idea for a Kate follow-up originated in early April 2022 after a discussion between Ilona and Gordon about their own Happily Ever After, which led Ilona to consider what Kate and Curran's would look like. A few days later, Ilona was browsing wikipedia and read about Manannán, saving the article for later reference. In September of that year, Ilona was inspired to write a short story about Kate and Curran; when she shared the idea with Gordon and her friend and fellow writer Jeaniene Frost, they doubted it would stay short story length. The final result, Magic Claims, was finished five weeks later with 40,000 words, qualifying it as a short novel.

No.	Title	Date	ISBN
1	Magic Tides	January 17, 2023	9781641972512
2	Magic Claims	June 13, 2023	9781641972512
3	TBA	TBA	

- The short story "Purpose" immediately follows the last scene of Magic Claims, with Kate giving the wizard Luther a tour of the Pale Queen's fortress.
- "No Heroes" is a story set in the Penderton Forest after Magic Claims.

A third book is planned but has not yet been announced. Andrews had said they hoped to start writing it in fall 2024 while editing This Kingdom Will Not Kill Me, but pivoted towards an Iron and Magic sequel instead.

As of April 2026, Graphic Audio has begun a dramatized audio adaptation of the series, to begin releasing later in the year.

=== Roman's Chronicles (2023–2024) ===
Roman, dark priest of Chernobog, sees his peaceful Christmas quickly turn into a full-on paramilitary assault after a teenage boy arrives on his property - close to death and clutching a puppy - requesting sanctuary.

The story focuses on Roman's relationship with Chernobog and slavic mythology in general.

==== Development and publication ====
A short story focusing on Roman, a supporting character introduced midway in the original series, titled "A bit more of Roman", was shared by the authors on their blog on March 2, 2020.

A serialized novel set after the short story was announced in December 2023. The completed story was self-published with NYLA on July 30, 2024 as Sanctuary (ISBN 978-1641972864).

While the authors have stated there is a possibility for a continuation of Roman's story, there is currently no follow-up planned.

== Chronological order ==
Novels in the main series are bolded. Alternate character points-of-view that take place concurrently to the novels are indented.

- "A Questionable Client"
- **Magic Bites**
  - Curran PoV: "Unicorn Lane", "Fernando's"
- **Magic Burns**
  - Curran PoV: "Soup"
- **Magic Strikes**
  - Curran PoV: "Midnight Games", "Hot Tub"
- Magic Mourns
- "Kate's Origin"
- **Magic Bleeds**
  - Curran Pov: "Naked Dinner", "Conclave", "Awake"
- Magic Dreams
- **Magic Slays**
- Gunmetal Magic
- Magic Gifts
- "An Ill-Advised Rescue"
- "Magic Tests"
- **Magic Rises**
- Magic Steals
- **Magic Breaks**
  - "Jim's Point of View"
- **Magic Shifts**
- Magic Stars
- **Magic Binds**
- Iron and Magic
- The Iron Covenant 2 (planned)
- **Magic Triumphs**
- "Grand Master Damian Angevin, In His Own Words"
- "A Bit More Roman"
- Sanctuary
- "The King of Fire"
- Magic Tides
- Magic Claims
- "Purpose"
- "No Heroes"
- Wilmington Years 3 (planned)
- Blood Heir
  - Kate PoV: "Sandra"

== Reception ==
In 2018, eleven years after the original publication of Magic Bites, Reactor called the series "an iconic urban fantasy". USA Today called the series "a must-read."

The first book, Magic Bites, was reviewed in Locus.

The sixth book, Magic Rises, debuted at #1 on the New York Times Best Seller list for Paperback Mass Market Fiction. Publishers Weekly praised the novel for "[v]ividly imagined fight scenes, clever use of obscure mythology, a uniquely interesting setting, and rich characterization", though it highlighted that enjoyment of the novel could be "hampered by the complexity of the pre-existing knowledge required to fully appreciate the developments." USA Today recommended that potential readers "[s]tart from the beginning", and praised the series for improving as it progressed.

The final installment, Magic Triumphs, reached #2 on the New York Times Combined Print & E-Book Fiction Bestseller List the week of September 16, 2018, and #5 on USA Today's Best-selling Booklist for the week of September 6, 2018.

== Adaptations ==
The main series has been adapted into dramatized audiobooks by Graphic Audio. As of November 2026, adaptations of the existing Wilmington Years books are in progress; an adaptation of Blood Heir is planned for release in January 2027.

In March 2016, Romantic Times reported that the Kate Daniels series had been optioned by producer Jerry Daigle for Voodoo Television.

== Critical Analysis ==
The Kate Daniels series is often considered a notable work in early 21st century urban fantasy literature, and the paranormal romance trend that rose to popularity in the early to mid-2000s. It is often mentioned alongside the works of Lauren K. Hamilton, Kim Harrison and Jim Butcher. Various literary scholars have analysed the environmental, feminist, and military themes of the series' urban fantasy setting and characters.
