= Magic Rises =

Fantasy novel by Ilona Andrews

- Cover of Magic Rises
- Author: Ilona Andrews
- Language: English
- Series: Kate Daniels
- Genre: urban fantasy
- Published: July 30, 2013 (Ace)
- Publication place: USA
- Media type: Print (paperback); Audiobook; E-book
- Pages: 368
- ISBN: 978-1937007584
- Preceded by: Magic Slays
- Followed by: Magic Breaks

Magic Rises is an urban fantasy novel by the husband-wife writing duo Ilona Andrews. It was published by Ace Books in 2013 and reached #1 on the New York Times Best Seller list.

== Plot ==
Kate, Curran and a team of pack members sail to Gagra, Georgia, in hopes of obtaining panacea, a tightly-controlled treatment to prevent shapeshifters from going loup during childbirth and puberty. There, they stay as guests of the local lord, their objective to guard the werewolf Desandra, who is pregnant with twins by two different fathers belonging to two different powerful European packs; the children's birth order will determine a desirable inheritance, putting Desandra and her babies at risk. However, Kate and Curran's united front is soon torn apart by the European packs' politics, attacks from mysterious winged monsters, and the flattering attentions of the Alaskan pack princess, Lorelei, towards Curran.

The Atlantans discover that the monsters are lamassu, created when genetically-predisposed shapeshifters commit cannibalism. Furthermore, one of Desandra's children is lamassu, meaning the attacks are coming from one of the fathers' packs. Kate is despondent that Curran is responding positively to Lorelei. At the end of her rope, she is goaded into a sword fight with the lord of the castle, who is actually Hugh D'Ambray. She wins, and takes as her prize a man named Christopher, who has been held captive by Hugh and seemingly tortured, his mind fractured. Curran admits that he knows Lorelei is a trap, but he is going along to keep Kate from becoming a target of the European packs. However, she is still not safe, because Hugh is determined she will stay with him in Georgia.

Hugh threatens them: if Curran leaves without Kate, he will leave with panacea, because Hugh secretly controls the supply. They refuse, and Hugh declares war. The Pack escapes with Desandra, her newborns, and Christopher, though they lose Aunt B, the Alpha of the Hyena Clan, who is murdered by Hugh's goons. Curran nearly kills Hugh, who teleports to escape after his back is broken. Kate and Curran are trapped as the castle burns around them; Curran proposes, and they are saved by a shepherd deity of the mountains. Once on their ship, they discover the casks of panacea that had been loaded when Hugh made his offer have been sabotaged. Sensing Kate's despair, Christopher tells her he can make more, which he does. They return to Atlanta and start producing panacea under Christopher's guidance. Curran proposes to Kate again, with a stone cut from the Wolf Diamond.

== Reception ==
Magic Rises debuted at #1 on the New York Times Best Seller list for Paperback Mass Market Fiction. Publishers Weekly praised the novel for "vividly imagined fight scenes, clever use of obscure mythology, a uniquely interesting setting, and rich characterization", though it highlighted that enjoyment of the novel could be "hampered by the complexity of the pre-existing knowledge required to fully appreciate the developments." USA Today recommended that potential readers "[s]tart from the beginning", and praised the series for improving as it progressed. The novel was also reviewed by Reactor and RT Book Reviews.
