= Magic Bites =

Fantasy novel by Ilona Andrews

- cover of Magic Bites special edition, 2012
- Author: Ilona Andrews
- Language: English
- Series: Kate Daniels
- Genre: urban fantasy
- Published: March 27, 2007 (Ace)
- Publication place: USA
- Media type: Print (paperback); Audiobook; E-book
- Pages: 352
- ISBN: 978-0441014897
- Followed by: Magic Burns

Magic Bites is an urban fantasy novel by the husband-wife writing duo Ilona Andrews, Ilona Gordon and Andrew Gordon (known mononymously as Gordon). It was their debut novel and the first in the Kate Daniels series, published by Ace Books in 2007.

== Plot ==
Kate Daniels lives in a future parallel universe where magic has returned to the world and now competes with technology for predominance. She is a lethal swordswoman, trained from birth to one day kill the sorcerer Roland.

Kate survives in obscurity until her former guardian is murdered; she chooses to risk raising her profile in exchange for vengeance. Always a loner, she must cooperate with the power players of post-magic-apocalypse Atlanta: the Order of Merciful Aid, a paragovernmental agency dedicated to the protection of the human race; the Pack, Atlanta's shapeshifters; and the People, a corporation committed to the research of necromancy and piloting the dead like drones.

Kate discovers that an upir murdered her guardian and has been targeting shapeshifters and the People in order to set off a factional war. His true target is Kate, whose power he needs to reproduce. Together with Curran, the Beast Lord of Atlanta, and Nick, a member of the Order of Merciful Aid, she kills the upir, though they barely escape with their lives. Impressed by her performance, the Order gives her a full-time position, ending Kate's financial insecurity.

== Development history ==
Ilona Gordon returned to writing as a hobby after the birth of her first child, and had soon produced two novels. She submitted the second novel to publishers and a literary agent and was rejected. One publisher said it was too similar to the Anita Blake: Vampire Hunter series by Laurell K. Hamilton. Ilona and Gordon, her husband, were unfamiliar with Hamilton, and were intimidated after reading the first Anita Blake books; however, Ilona recognized her heroine was different enough that the feedback wasn't necessarily valid.

Ilona, who was now writing together with Gordon, joined Online Writing Workshop (OWW) and began receiving regular feedback on their work. One story garnered positive feedback and recognition, but she was frustrated that she couldn't edit it into something better. She began writing an introduction that felt different than her previous efforts; Gordon was enthusiastic and encouraged her to post it to OWW. The feedback was very positive.

Ilona and Gordon took the snippet and worked it with parts of her original second novel to draft a new story they titled Lost Dog. She submitted it in response to a call for submissions from Tor; a year and a half later, she received an email from Liz Gorinsky, then at Tor, expressing interest. Several months later, the couple had acquired a literary agent, but Lost Dog had made no progress; Gorinsky loved the novel, but Tor itself was less enthusiastic. Their agent withdrew and shopped it elsewhere. In June 2005, it sold to Ace along with a sequel; the novel was renamed Magic Bites and published in 2007 under the pen name, "Ilona Andrews".

=== Publication history ===
- 2007, USA, Ace ISBN 978-0441014897, Pub date 27 March 2007, Paperback

The novel was released as an unabridged audiobook in 2016, read by Renee Raudman.

Graphic Audio released a dramatized audio adaptation on April 11, 2023.

== Reception ==
Magic Bites was well received, with reviewers complimenting the world building, its twist on werewolves and vampires, and the heroine, while acknowledging that it wasn't breaking new ground within the genre.

RT Book Reviews called Kate "enjoyable" but "indistinguishable" from other heroines of the urban fantasy genre. Reviewer Natalie A. Luhrs complimented the pacing and worldbuilding.

The novel was also reviewed in Locus.

In 2023, Reactor called the novel "an iconic urban fantasy", complimenting Kate as "a chaos agent, a troublemaker, and an ultimate good guy".
