= Magic Triumphs =

2018 novel by Ilona Andrews

- Original US/Canada cover
- Author: Ilona Andrews
- Cover artist: Juliana Kolesova
- Language: English
- Series: Kate Daniels
- Genre: urban fantasy
- Published: August 28, 2018 (hardcover, Ace); May 7, 2019 (paperback, Ace)
- Publication place: USA
- Media type: Print (Hardcover, Paperback) e-Book; Audiobook
- Pages: 439 (paperback edition)
- ISBN: 978-0698136823
- Preceded by: Magic Binds
- Website: Magic Triumphs at penguinrandomhouse.com

Magic Triumphs is an urban fantasy novel by American writer Ilona Andrews. It is the tenth and final novel in the Kate Daniels series, published by Ace Books. The novel was released in both paperback and hardback.

In the novel, Kate faces a new foe who had attacked her family in the ancient past. In doing so, she must seek the support of the family that has previously fought against her.

== Plot ==
Kate gives birth to a son, Conlan. Roland attempts to take the newborn; Kate rebuffs him with her magic.

A year later, she is back at work, facing an elder power that is kidnapping entire communities, leaving only puddles of their liquified flesh. She receives a small box containing a knife and a red rose atop a bed of ash. The next day, her office is under attack by unsettling beasts when she sees a fireball in the distance. It is Yu Fong - a friend of Julie's - who has fallen from the sky. He is in a coma, but survives because he is Suanni, a dragon thought to be myth. When Kate and crew bring home the body of one of the beasts who attacked the office, Erra sets fire to their vehicle in rage, recognizing it as the creatures that murdered her family in ancient times. She tells Kate the box is a means of declaring war and insists she ask Roland for assistance, even though he is mobilizing to attack Atlanta. Kate attempts to contact her father via magic fire; he ignores her. An unknown man cuts into the call, but before he can speak, the magic falls.

Kate goes to the Witch Oracle for a prophecy, to understand who would murder an entire neighborhood. All they can show her is a fiery battle. Another neighborhood is stolen. At the site, the unknown man appears in fire again; Kate recognizes his armor from the witches' vision and realizes the box is connected with the murders. He is Neig the Undying; his brother had killed Roland and Erra's family. Kate calls her father again, and he ignores her again. Kate visits the druids; they tell her Neig is a dragon, which is why he attacked Yu Fong.

In a show of power, Neig takes a community of 1000 and burns their town to nothing, then traps Rowena in a molten glass cylinder. Kate knows she doesn't have the magic to save Rowena alone; she calls Roland, this time burning her arm in the fire. He appears, and backs her up so she can release Rowena unharmed. Roland tells Kate that Neig exists in a pocket reality, and warns her to never visit. Neig had also sent a boar god, Moccus, as a distraction; Curran kills it and eats it, transforming into a winged demigod. He admits that it's the sixth animal god he's consumed. Kate is devastated, because Curran's existence is now dependent on faith.

Saiman devises a way to communicate with Yu Fong in his coma; he tells them that every dragon's domain centers on an anchor, something precious to the dragon. Julie surprises everyone when she shows up with Hugh and his wife. They have encountered Neig in battle and offer to field troops; Hugh is apologetic for the harm he has caused, particularly towards Kate and Christopher. He heals Yu Fong, who remains in a coma. Kate accepts an invitation to Neig's realm. She quickly identifies his anchor: a ruby embedded in his throne. He shows off his army to her - it is over ten thousand strong. She challenges him to battle and returns to reality to find her father, furious that she has visited Neig. He tells her she could've died, revealing his actual concern is for himself, because their lives are tied due to his magic. He agrees to join the fight. Yu Fong wakes and tells them that if they steal the anchor, it will temporarily trap Neig in their reality so he can be killed.

In battle with Neig, Roland appears at the last minute, turning the tide. Julie steals and delivers Neig's anchor to Kate; its magic pulls heavily on her. They defeat Neig and Roland turns on Kate. Out of options, Kate sacrifices herself on her sword, dooming both herself and Roland. She offers him the stone and Roland absorbs its magic, desperate to preserve his life. He disappears into Neig's realm, having made himself its new anchor. Erra pours her magic into Kate in an effort to save her life; it's not enough - Erra fades and Kate dies. In the afterlife, Kate meets Curran in his god form. He resurrects her; because Erra's magic was in Kate's body, she is also resurrected. Curran is now human again, having only enough divinity for one miracle. Death has freed Kate from her claim on Atlanta and her bond with Julie.

After the battle, Erra leaves Atlanta hoping to reclaim the innocence of her youth, before grief and rage turned her and Roland into tyrants. Julie has followed her, wanting to start fresh. Erra accepts her, recognizing Julie's magical potency and potential.

== Development history ==
Kate Daniels was originally planned as a seven-book series; however, while editing Magic Rises, book six, Andrews realized that the existing storylines could not be satisfactorily wrapped up in a single book. They approached Ace about extending the series, and in early 2013 signed a deal for three additional books, the third of which would become Magic Triumphs.

The Andrews completed the first draft of the novel in January 2018. A few days later, they announced the book would be published in August of that year.

=== Publication history ===
- 2018, US, Ace, ISBN 9780425270714, Pub date 28 August 2018, Hardback
- 2018, US, Brilliance Audio, Pub date 28 August 2018, Audiobook
- 2019, US, Ace, ISBN 9780425270721, Pub date 7 May 2019, Paperback

The original hardback featured a mistake where Kate's son, Conlan, is described as 18-months-old. This issue was fixed in later printings.

The book has been translated into German, French, Czech, and Polish.

Graphic Audio adapted the book into a dramatized audiobook, which was released May 20, 2025. It features the same cover art as the French edition, by German artist Luisa Preissler.

== Reception ==
The novel was well received. BookPage praised the "wildly creative... literary imagination" of Magic Triumphs, and appreciated how Kate and Curran's entry into parenthood "add[s] a layer of Andrews’ trademark humor to the constant danger." RT Book Reviews highlighted Kate's character development over time and called the main characters' slow-burn romance "thrilling, funny and quite sexy", praising the novel for successfully concluding the story. Den of Geek called it "a compelling conclusion", highlighting the novel's treatment of the complicated relationship between Kate and her father: it "tread[s] that fine line that heroes and villains walk, knowing that they are two sides of the same coin, here with the added love of kinship that makes the ultimate conflict almost unbearably hard." The novel was also reviewed by Locus, who called it "a reasonably satisfactory conclusion".

Magic Triumphs, reached #2 on the New York Times Combined Print & E-Book Fiction Bestseller List the week of September 16, 2018, and #5 on USA Today's Best-selling Booklist for September 6, 2018. According to Bookscan, the hardcover edition sold 4,528 copies its first week of sales.
