= The Innkeeper Chronicles =

Series of science fantasy novels by Ilona Andrews

- Covers of The Innkeeper Chronicles by Ilona Andrews
- Clean Sweep (2013); Sweep in Peace (2015); One Fell Sweep (2016); Sweep of the Blade (2019); Sweep of the Heart (2022)
- Author: Ilona Andrews
- Cover artist: Doris Mantair
- Country: United States
- Language: English
- Discipline: Urban fantasy; Science Fantasy
- Publisher: self published/NYLA
- Published: December 20, 2013 — present
- Media type: Print (paperback); Audiobook; E-book
- Website: The Innkeeper Chronicles on ilona-andrews.com

The Innkeeper Chronicles is an ongoing urban fantasy and science fiction novel series by the husband-wife writing duo Ilona Andrews, originally serialized on the authors' blog before being self-published. The story follows Dina Demille, who operates a bed and breakfast, Gertrude Hunt. The Inn is secretly an intergalactic rest stop for extraterrestrial visitors, and itself a living entity that responds and reforms itself at Dina's command. Throughout the series, Dina must balance the health of her business, the safety of her guests and her own quest to find her parents, while preserving the universe's secrets.

The most recent entry, Sweep of the Heart, was published in 2022, and at least one more novel is planned. The books are narrated from Dina's point of view, except for the fourth volume which follows Maud as she travels to the vampire Arland's home planet.

== Setting ==
For hundreds of years, the Earth's Inns have hosted intergalactic visitors while maintaining the secret of alien life. Innkeepers operate largely autonomously, though they self-govern via the mysterious Innkeeper Assembly. The Assembly maintains a rating system for the benefit of travelers, assigns Inns to new Innkeepers, and can remove an Innkeeper if they are unfit. However, they only interfere in the rarest of cases.

Innkeepers are nearly omnipotent on their Inn's grounds, but otherwise have limited magic. The ad-hal are the Assembly's enforcers, and have no limits to their magic. They are rarely deployed—most Innkeepers will never encounter one—and frequently the children of Innkeepers.

Inns are interdimensional and can grow into new dimensions, creating a door for access. All Inns will grow a door to Baha-char, the galaxy's bazaar. Because of the city's role as a cross-universe trading outpost, bartering is common.

In the Innkeeper universe, vampires and werewolves are alien species, sharing a common genetic ancestor with Earth's humans. Werewolves are genetically-modified military weapons, developed to defend their home planet from invasion. The defense failed; small numbers of the werewolves managed to escape and now live as refugees across the universe. Vampires are similarly technologically advanced predators, living in a highly militarized, feudalistic society, organized into Houses, in their own solar systems.

The world overlaps with that of Andrews' other series, The Edge and Breach Wars. Jack and George, introduced in On the Edge, are first sighted in Clean Sweep; Sophie and Gaston, introduced in Bayou Moon, first appear in Sweep in Peace. In addition to their roles as regular side characters in Dina's world, their appearance serves to wrap up loose storylines from The Edge series. The Lees, a fox-like creature introduced in the Innkeeper world, also appears in The Inheritance.

== Plot ==
=== Clean Sweep ===
Dina Demille operates the Gertrude Hunt Bed and Breakfast in Red Deer, Texas; her proprietorship is new and the Inn usually empty, relying on its one permanent guest, Caldenia (a former galactic tyrant living in exile after murdering her brother), to sustain its magic. The novel opens as the quiet suburban neighborhood surrounding the Inn is terrorized by a territorial space predator. Dina recruits her new neighbor, the incognito werewolf Sean Evans, to deal with the threat.

Dina is contacted by a group from House Krahr, a powerful vampire family, seeking the creature's keeper; they hunt it, but only one of their party survives. His nephew, Arland, arrives at the Inn to care for him. After a conversation with Caldenia, Arland begins to suspect that the perpetrator had been hired by his traitorous cousin.

Sean had been unaware of the wider universe and his true heritage, that werewolves are actually aliens left planet-less after a brutal war. Dina takes him to Baha-char for the first time and they encounter Wilmos, one of the scientists responsible for the genetic program that created Sean's parents. Wilmos has skin-fusing armor made specifically for Sean's kind; he gives it to him in exchange for a favor. Sean puts on the armor and is intoxicated by its effect; he kisses Dina back at the Inn.

Arland, Dina, and Sean set a trap for Arland's cousin. Arland kills him and returns to his planet with his now-recovered uncle, with deep gratitude towards Dina and the Inn; Sean leaves to repay his favor to Wilmos; and Dina remains in the quiet solitude of Gertrude Hunt.

=== Sweep in Peace ===
Dina is approached to host an intergalactic peace conference; Gertrude Hunt desperately needs guests to refresh its magic, and if the talks are successful, she will get a significant bonus. She accepts, and the Inn is soon overrun by the negotiating parties: the vampires, including House Krahr, the Hope-Crushing Hoard, the Merchant Lees led by Nuan Cee, and the Arbitrator George and his team.

The talks do not progress well, because the warring parties are more concerned with avenging their dead than saving the living. The Merchants hide behind Turan Adin, the unstoppable fighter who leads their mercenary forces. As part of a compromise to allow the Hoard to celebrate a holy festival, the Merchants bring Turan Adin to the Inn. The vampires and Hoard attack him on sight, violating the Inn's neutrality and horrifying Dina.

In shame, the Hoard prepares to leave the talks. Dina attempts to persuade them to stay, but is poisoned by an invisible foe. Nuan Cee has the antidote, and Turan Adin extends his contract in exchange for Dina's life. When she awakes, she realizes that Turan Adin is Sean, who initially took the contract to pay back his debt to Wilmos, but is now stuck because the Lees are otherwise defenseless.

Dina is desperate to save Sean, and arranges a risky ritual with the Inn to force the guests to empathize with each other. It is successful, and the parties agree to peace. Sean is freed of his contract, and Dina and Gertrude Hunt are financially and magically secure. Dina and Sean act on their mutual attraction and go on a date.

=== One Fell Sweep ===
After rescuing her sister, Maud, and niece, Helen, from a backwater vampire planet with the help of Arland and Sean, Dina is approached by an unusual guest: a Hiru, one of a species trapped in revolting, mechanical exoskeletons since losing their planet due to a holy war waged against them by a race called the Draziri. The Hiru have petitioned the Archivarius, a hive being whose parts would need to be collected by Dina. The Archivarius can answer any question, and the Hiru have paid for two questions: one to find a new home, and one for Dina to ask about her parents. Maud, Sean, and Arland pledge to support her. They are soon joined by Tony, the adult son of a San Antonio Innkeeper.

The Draziri launch an offensive against Gertrude Hunt, not realizing that Dina is nearly all-powerful on the Inn's grounds. She is badly injured when a corrupted Innkeeper attacks her in Baha-char; they take the body of the attacker back to the Inn to figure out what it is. The Draziri next set a trap, fusing a rare Inn seed with a teenage Draziri girl and strapping her to a bomb. Dina cannot resist the pull of the dying baby Inn; she transports herself and the girl to another world in a bid to save Gertrude Hunt from the fallout. Just before the seed dies, she bonds with it. Sean recovers her, but Dina is left catatonic.

Maud and the others prepare to finish collecting the Archivarious and defend against the Draziri. Dina is aware of what's happening, including when the corruption escapes from the body of her Baha-char attacker, but can't break out of her vegetative state. During the battle, Tony reveals himself as an ad-hal and halts the fighting. As Tony passes judgement on the Draziri, Dina senses the corruption targeting him; she finally wakes and destroys it. Restored to her Inn, Dina asks the Archivarius how she can find her parents. She receives a cryptic answer: "SEBASTIEN NORTH". The Hiru are given a new planet; as they prepare to transport there, they shed their mechanical exoskeletons, revealing themselves to be the beautiful swan-like birds the Draziri worship as their god. The Draziri leader is banished by Tony, and his followers disperse, devastated by what they've seen.

Dina and Sean formalize their relationship; Sean has sold his house so he can become an Innkeeper with Dina, fully turning his back on the militaristic path laid out for him by his predecessors.

=== Sweep of the Blade ===
Maud had sworn off vampire men after the betrayal of her husband, but is nonetheless attracted to Arland. He is required to return to his planet as his House prepares to host a politically significant wedding between two long-rivaled Houses. He invites her and Helen to join him; Maud accepts.

House Krahr is not receptive towards Maud, and she is further targeted by the wedding guests of the visiting Houses. She is already pushed to the limits of her social and political skills when Helen is attacked with a poison dart. Maud turns to Nuan Cee and the Merchants for the antidote.

The attacker had framed the tachi, an insect-like humanoid species; as the daughter of Innkeepers, Maud knows the tachi are peaceful, and realizes that one of the visiting Houses was likely behind the attack. She negotiates an agreement of mutual protection between House Krahr, the tachi, and the Merchants.

Maud is hired by the House as their Maven, making her their ambassador and negotiator. She and the new cross-alien alliance foil the plot of the rival Houses. Maud agrees to marry Arland.

=== Sweep of the Heart ===
Wilmos is kidnapped, and Dina and Sean trace him to a collapsed portal that led to Karron, an abandoned, uninhabitable planet. Only one galactic power maintains a portal there, and they need a favor: the Sovereign is seeking a neutral location to host a spouse selection. It will be a massive spectacle, complicated by the fact that the ruler is Caldenia's nephew, the son of the brother she murdered.

Soon the Inn is hosting hundreds of alien guests. Dina is terrified of something happening to the Sovereign, because she will lose the Inn. Only now does he inform her of a plot to assassinate him during the selection. He reveals the truth of Caldenia's actions and they reconcile. His assassin is intercepted and he chooses his future spouse. Sean and Dina can finally travel to Karron to find Wilmos.

Once there, they enter a corrupted, dying Inn; Dina realizes it is her parents', the one they disappeared with. She finds the person responsible, a former Innkeeper who is mad with bitterness against the Assembly; he wants to end all Innkeepers and Inns, but particularly Dina's family. He reveals himself as Sebastien North and blames the Innkeeper Assembly for the harm they have caused him. The Inn is destroying itself to protect Dina; it gifts her with a small sprout and pushes her out of the portal with Sean and Wilmos.

Two Inns cannot be located too closely together or they will both die, but Dina knows she must graft the sprout onto Gertrude Hunt. Against the warnings of Tony, she allows the Inns to join. The Inn had been expanding, and with the sprout's magic, the door is suddenly ready. Dina opens it and finds herself on Daesyn, the home planet of House Krahr. Tony warns her that no one can know what has happened.

== Development history ==
Each book in the series was originally posted in serial installments on the author's blog, then self published. When they first began posting Clean Sweep, they received emails advising them not to do it, due to the challenge of editing and because it was unwise to give away their work. The authors continued with the serialization, and it became a popular draw to their blog. They've shared that the serial posts cause traffic spikes, as fans return to re-read entries and discuss with other readers.

At least one more book is planned for the series, to wrap up the story of Dina's quest to find her parents. In February 2026, they described finishing that arc as a priority alongside Maggie the Undying, their ongoing epic fantasy trilogy published by Tor Books.

=== Publishing history ===
No.	Title	Date	Length	ISBN
1	Clean Sweep	December 2, 2013	250 pages	978-1625173430
2	Sweep in Peace	November 13, 2015	320 pages	978-1943772322
3	One Fell Sweep	December 20, 2016	352 pages	978-1943772711
4	Sweep of the Blade	July 16, 2019	322 pages	978-1641971041
4.5	Sweep With Me	January 14, 2020	146 pages	978-1641971362
5	Sweep of the Heart	December 13, 2022	456 pages	978-1641972390
6	TBA	TBA		

The series has been released as unabridged audiobooks. The first two books were narrated by Renee Raudman; Sweep of the Blade and Sweep with Me by Natalie Naudus; and Sweep of the Heart by Nora Sofyan.

==== Short Stories ====
- "Gerard Demille And Helen Meet", ilona-andrews.com, March 4, 2011
- "I Will Explain Everything", ilona-andrews.com, January 17, 2024

== Reception ==
In its review of Clean Sweep, Romantic Times called the novel "humorous and thrilling" and complimented the Andrews' world building. Locus reviewed the omnibus edition of the first three volumes released by Subterranean Press; Carolyn Cushman called it "fast, fun reading" and a "charming mix of action, character-based funny bits, and the occasional heartwarming moment". One Fell Sweep, the third volume, reached #2 on the New York Times Bestseller List for E-Book Fiction.

The authors have shared that the serialization of Maud's story, which was published as Sweep of the Blade, was the most successful in terms of blog traffic, as it was posted. The series overall has become their best-selling series.

== Adaptations ==
Graphic Audio has produced dramatized audio adaptations of the existing series. Their adaptation of Clean Sweep was nominated for the Audie Award for Audio Drama in 2023.

In 2022, the novel Clean Sweep was adapted into a web comic by Tapas. The comic has since been published in two print volumes.
