= Hidden Legacy =

Series of fantasy novels by Ilona Andrews

- Cover of Burn For Me, book 1 of the Hidden Legacy series
- Burn For Me (2014); White Hot (2017); Wildfire (2017); Sapphire Flames (2019); Emerald Blaze (2020); Ruby Fever (2022)
- Author: Ilona Andrews
- Country: United States
- Language: English
- Discipline: Urban fantasy; contemporary fantasy romance
- Website: Hidden Legacy on ilona-andrews.com

Hidden Legacy is a contemporary fantasy romance series by the husband-wife writing duo Ilona Andrews, Ilona Gordon and Andrew Gordon (known mononymously as Gordon), published by Avon Books. The story follows the daughters of the Baylor family—Nevada, Catalina, and Arabella—who run a small private detective firm in Houston.

The series is divided into two trilogies; the first told from the perspective of Nevada, the second from Catalina's after Nevada steps down from running the agency. Hidden Legacy is considered finished by the authors as of February 2026, though they have said there is a possibility of a third trilogy focusing on Arabella.

== Setting ==
The series is set in a parallel universe, where the discovery of the Osiris Serum in the 19th century enabled heritable magical abilities in humans. Centuries later, the serum is banned and the world ruled by dynasties of existing magic-imbued families called Houses, who marry to maximize their magic, maintain private armies, and own global corporations. Competition between Houses is ruthless, resulting in ongoing warfare and a culture of cruelty.

Magic users are ranked based on the strength of their power: Minor, Average, Notable, Significant, and Prime. For a new House to be created, a family must have at least two Primes, who undergo trials to have their magic certified.

Ilona Gordon has talked about how they use magic in the novels to shift society's balance of power: “A lot of times in our society there are old ways to power: wealth, obviously; technology; dominating market space; old political family clubs. We introduced magic into that like throwing a wrecking ball at societal structure.”

== Plot ==
=== Nevada's Trilogy ===
Nevada Baylor is a private investigator, supporting her large, extended family via the agency she inherited from her father. She and her sisters have their own magic, which they keep secret; Nevada is a Truthseeker and can detect when people are lying.

In Burn For Me, Nevada is obliged to take a case that draws her into House politics. She is kidnapped by the notorious Connor "Mad" Rogan, a suspect. They discover that their causes are aligned and Rogan seeks an alliance. Nevada is resistant, until her family's home is attacked. In rage, her magic swells, unlocking a new ability to compel the truth from Rogan - he didn't order the attack. With Nevada's enhanced power, they track the perpetrator, a fire mage who is threatening to burn the city. Rogan stops the spread of fire by building a wall of rubble with his magic, however, once he starts, he cannot stop. Nevada realizes he will raze the city; she kisses him, bringing him back to reality. A week later, Rogan finds Nevada at home, seeking to whisk her away based on their kiss; Nevada refuses and Rogan vows to win her over.

A couple of months later, the beginning of White Hot, Rogan has been silent since propositioning Nevada. He has not forgotten her though, and after encountering her with a new client, works his way into the investigation. The client is an animal mage, and they use his animals (two ferrets and a ferret-badger) to break into a murdered informant's house to steal the evidence they need to identify a suspect. While pursuing the murderer, Nevada and Rogan are caught in his trap. Rogan manages to overpower his magic and Nevada finishes the job, killing him. They find the mage's co-conspirator, the mother of Rogan's ex-fiancée. Nevada's client kills her, avenging his wife's death.

Nevada also learns the source of her family's magic: her estranged paternal grandmother, Victoria Tremaine, a powerful Truthseeker, is the last heir of her House and will hold nothing back to preserve her legacy. Nevada and Rogan escape on a holiday, but are forced to return to Houston when they learn that Tremaine had sought to control the family by buying their mortgage. Rogan had beat Tremaine to it, which Nevada initially perceived as controlling; she realizes Rogan acted to shield her from the dark side of House relations.

In Wildfire, Nevada returns home from their trip to find Rynda, Rogan's ex-fiancee crying in the family's kitchen; her husband, Brian, has disappeared and she needs Nevada's investigative help. In the face of the threat of their grandmother, the Baylor family decides to register as a House, which will give them three years of immunity against aggression from other Houses, therefore blocking Victoria Tremaine. However, registering raises Nevada's profile, attracting more unwanted attention.

Nevada and Rogan discover Rynda's husband has been kidnapped. The kidnappers act suspiciously though, and they uncover that Brian was in on the plot and arranged to have Rynda killed. Nevada and Connor track down the person responsible, penetrating his heavily guarded compound. Brian emerges and his brother kills him, since he has dishonored his house. Victoria Tremaine had supported the conspiracy, but ultimately chooses to protect her family. Nevada and Rogan become engaged.

=== Catalina's Trilogy ===
Catalina is revealed as a Siren in the earlier books; she can make people fall in love with her, but if she continues for too long, her targets become dangerous to her. As such, Sirens are rare, frequently killed before they can become a threat to their communities.

Sapphire Flames begins nearly three years after the conclusion of Wildfire. Catalina is now the head of House Baylor, which is nearing the end of its immunity period. As she investigates the murders of a friend's family members, she encounters Alessandro Sagredo, Prime heartthrob. However, Alessandro is far more than he appears; he's a brutal assassin and his magic functions to protect him, notably allowing him to conjure weapons as he needs them. Catalina and Alessandro work together to solve the case, uncovering a deeper conspiracy in the process. Catalina has been reluctant to accept her feelings for Alessandro due to the nature of her magic, and is devastated when he leaves town for his next target.

== Development history ==
Ilona and Gordon were introduced to Erika Tsang, an editor for Avon Books, at a Romantic Times convention. They were signed by Avon before they had fully conceived what would become Hidden Legacy. They were inspired to make it a family story at the suggestion of a reviewer, and created Nevada's family dynamic partially as wish fulfillment, as neither of them come from large families.

Ilona has said that Burn For Me has its roots in previous short stories: they first explored the idea of hereditary magic and powerful families in "Of Swine and Roses" (which was eventually published in 2015 as part of the anthology Small Magics). The stories of the Kinsmen universe explored themes of romance and humans enhanced with magic. Their use of Houston in the novels was inspired by Robert B. Parker's Spenser series.

In April 2018, the duo announced they had signed a deal for an additional three books in the series, and that they would be releasing a novella to bridge the gap between the two trilogies. The decision to switch perspective to Catalina came from their editor at Avon.

They have shared that writing the final book of Catalina's trilogy, Ruby Fever, was a struggle, due to the challenge of wrapping up plot threads and delivering an emotionally satisfying conlcusion. Ilona described a conversation with their agent: "I was crying and moaning about the fact that it’s not going. And she told me 'The two of you need to care a little bit less and just do it.'" Gordon added, "if this was our first, second or third book, there’s probably no way we would have been able to do this on our own."

In fall 2025, they begin posting snippets from a new story about Augustine, a side character introduced in Burn For Me. The story grew to novella length, and was published as Beast Business in paperback and ebook in January 2026. The story was written to wrap up hints they'd left about Augustine and his burgeoning romantic relationship with another side character, Diana, as well as his mentor relationship with Arabella.

The Andrews have said a trilogy focusing on Arabella, the third sister, is a possibility; in an interview with the New York Times in 2022, they indicated they had begun planning for the arc. However, as of early 2026, the authors consider the story "complete for now".

=== Publishing history ===
No.	Title	Date	Length	ISBN
1	Burn For Me	October 28, 2014	366 pages	978-0062289247
2	White Hot	May 30, 2017	397 pages	978-0062289261
3	Wildfire	July 25, 2017	394 pages	978-0062289285
3.5	Diamond Fire	November 6, 2018	131 pages	978-0062878410
4	Sapphire Flames	August 27, 2019	437 pages	978-0062878335
5	Emerald Blaze	August 25, 2020	399 pages	978-0062878373
6	Ruby Fever	August 23, 2022	380 pages	978-0062878403
6.5	Beast Business	January 29, 2026	214 pages	978-1641973687

Short stories

- Rogan PoV collection, ilona-andrews.com, March 5, 2017
- "A Misunderstanding", ilona-andrews.com, July 7, 2019
- "Pay Me", ilona-andrews.com, August 22, 2019
- "The Cool Aunt", ilona-andrews.com, September 14, 2020
- "Regina", ilona-andrews.com, February 14, 2022
- "Marty, the electrical ferret", ilona-andrews.com, November 26, 2025

The novels have been released as audiobooks by Avon, with Nevada's trilogy read by Renee Raudman and Catalina's by Emily Rankin.

Graphic Audio is producing dramatized audio adaptations of the series, beginning with Burn For Me, released April 25, 2025.

== Reception ==
The series has been well received by reviewers. Library Journal praised White Hot as a "high-energy, smartly plotted adventure". Kirkus Reviews called the novel "[a]n enthralling paranormal romance from a master of the genre." AudioFile magazine praised Renee Raudman's performance of White Hot, and recognized the audiobook as a Best Romance of 2017.

Wildfire, the third book of the series, reached #3 on the New York Times Best Seller list and #2 on the USA Today Best-selling Booklist. It was reviewed in the August 2017 issue of Locus Magazine. In 2024, Time Magazine included it in its list of "50 Best Romance Novels to Read Right Now".

Kirkus raved over Emerald Blaze, book 5, saying "Andrews has a gift for placing likable characters within complex and interesting mysteries in which small, seemingly inconsequential, clues weave together into a spectacular finish", and called Ruby Fever, the sixth volume, a "spectacular, satisfying finish".

However, some readers were not pleased with the switch in perspective from Nevada to Catalina in book 4; Ilona told Den of Geek, "[f]ans were livid", though writer Alana Joli Abbott also highlighted readers who thanked Andrews for depicting Catalina as a heroine with anxiety.
