= Ilona Andrews =

American husband-and-wife writing duo

- Born: Ilona Gordon in the Soviet Union Andrew Gordon in Florida, USA
- Education: Western Carolina University
- Occupation: Writers
- Years active: 2007–present
- Notable work: Kate Daniels; The Innkeeper Chronicles; This Kingdom Will Not Kill Me
- Website: ilona-andrews.com

Ilona Andrews, also commonly referred to as House Andrews, is the pen name of Ilona Gordon and Andrew Gordon (known mononymously as Gordon), an American husband-and-wife duo writing urban fantasy, science fiction, and paranormal fiction. Their debut novel, Magic Bites (2007), was the first in the Kate Daniels series, which was named by Reactor as "an iconic urban fantasy". They are also known for the Hidden Legacy book series.

They have blogged since the beginning of their career and in 2013, began using the platform to publish free, serialized fiction. The novels and novella in their series The Innkeeper Chronicles were first serialized then self published. They have released over 40 novels and novellas via traditional and self-publishing channels.

Their work frequently deals with the line between technology and magic, and the after effects of military service and violence in general, while their settings focus on the American South.

== Biography ==
=== Ilona Gordon ===
Ilona Gordon was born in the Soviet Union to scientist parents. Her exposure to fantasy as a child was limited; the genre wasn't widely available in Russia until perestroika, which coincided with her adolescence. As a child, she had access to translations of The Hobbit and The Wizard of Oz (which was radically different from the original due to censorship), and her father gave her a copy of 2001: A Space Odyssey. After perestroika, she became a fan of Robert E. Howard and Leigh Brackett, whose works were available bootleged.

She was a gifted student, frequently participating in state-sponsored academic Olympiads. As a result of a cultural exchange trip to the USA as a teenager, and despite her limited English, she received a full scholarship to attend Rabun Gap-Nacoochee School, a boarding school in the state of Georgia. She continued to excel there, eventually enrolling at Western Carolina University, where she majored in biochemistry and met Andrew Gordon.

=== Andrew Gordon ===
Andrew Beauregard Gordon was born in Florida, U.S., and grew up in the Great Smoky Mountains of North Carolina, where he was raised by his aunt and uncle. They were strict, forbidding him from listening to rock music or reading books depicting magic. As a teenager, he would sneak the Dragonlance books and other fantasy and sci-fi into the house; he was also a fan of the Spenser detective novels by Robert B. Parker, which were permitted, as well as Flash Gordon and Thundarr the Barbarian.

Gordon, as he is known, served four years in the United States Navy as a communications officer, then attended Western Carolina University to study history and political science.

=== Relationship ===
Ilona and Gordon met in a writing course at WCU in early 1994. They bonded over Robert E. Howard, whose work Gordon had a large collection of, and began collaborating and editing one another's school work. Eventually they wrote their first novel together, an epic fantasy which has never been published.

The couple married in August 1995, despite the objections of their families; Ilona's scholarship program had been cut after her freshman year, forcing her to drop out of university and leaving her with few options in the US.

After the births of their daughters, Gordon dropped out of college himself and re-enlisted in the Navy to support the family. They moved frequently during this time, between Georgia, North Carolina, Oklahoma, and Texas. When Gordon finished his service, they moved again to Savannah, GA. In 2006, while awaiting the publication of Magic Bites, Gordon worked as a human resources coordinator and Ilona as a legal secretary.

In an interview, they cited Gordon's military service as shaping their marriage, training them to view themselves as a team and that their success comes together.

==== Writing Process ====
Early in their career, Ilona described their writing process: "[W]e start with the primary character, talk it over until we have a plot, and then I write it. Gordon edits the draft, gripes, and points out parts that make no sense. The draft comes back to me, and I edit it again. The draft goes to Gordon... you get the idea."

Their approach has since evolved; while they still edit solo, passing drafts back and forth, they now write side by side with two chairs at one computer; one will dictate and the other will type. While Ilona will write the first draft of lines of female characters and Gordon the male characters, everything they produce they consider a collaboration. They plot their stories near continuously, since they are always together, and map out fight scenes physically, drawing on Gordon's experience in judo.

Gordon described writing together like marriage: "You have to realize the other person has strengths that compensate for your weaknesses." The duo have said that Gordon's strengths are in plotting and humor, while Ilona's are in worldbuilding and relationships.

Their writing is heavily inspired by world mythology; Gordon had studied history and mythology and Ilona grew up hearing Slavic folk tales. They have cited Greek myths as their common ground; the first argument they had was about who had pulled the sun around the sky. They find new sources of material by visiting used book stores; they seek out sources on Native American mythologies at tribal stores.

== Career ==
=== Early Career and Kate Daniels (2000s-2013) ===
Ilona had enjoyed writing as a child, but never viewed it as a career path. She returned to writing as a hobby after the birth of her first child, and soon had produced two novels. She submitted the second novel to publishers and a literary agent and was rejected. One publisher said it was too similar to the Anita Blake: Vampire Hunter series by Laurell K. Hamilton. Ilona and Gordon were unfamiliar with Hamilton, and were intimidated after reading the first Anita Blake books; however, Ilona recognized her heroine was different enough that the feedback wasn't necessarily valid.

Ilona, who was now writing again with Gordon, joined Online Writing Workshop (OWW) and began receiving regular feedback on their work. One story garnered positive feedback and recognition, but she was frustrated that she couldn't edit it into something better. She began writing an introduction to something new; Gordon was enthusiastic and encouraged her to post it to OWW. The feedback was very positive.

Ilona and Gordon took the snippet and worked it with parts of her original second novel to draft a new story they titled Lost Dog. She submitted it in response to a call for submissions from Tor Books; a year and a half later, she received an email from Liz Gorinsky, then at Tor, expressing interest. Several months later, the couple had acquired a literary agent, but Lost Dog had made no progress; Gorinsky loved the story, but Tor itself was less enthusiastic. Their agent withdrew the novel and shopped it elsewhere.

In June 2005, Lost Dog sold to Ace Books along with a sequel; it was published in 2007 as Magic Bites under the pen name, "Ilona Andrews". Magic Bites was the first in what would become the 10-volume, urban fantasy series Kate Daniels, set in an alternative future where technology and magic flood the world in alternating waves. Ace would acquire the third and fourth Kate books in November 2007.

The duo released their first self-published work with Nancy Yost Literary Agency (NYLA) in June 2009, Silent Blade, the first entry in The Kinsmen Universe. Kinsmen is an unconnected series of stories set in a sci-fi, spacefaring future where human genetic modification has resulted in a select few families possessing dangerous abilities that have allowed them to consolidate wealth and power. Ilona has shared that the stories are inspired by the tropes of the Harlequin Presents novels.

The following month, they released the first book in their second series, The Edge, also with Ace. The series is described by the publisher as "rustic fantasy", and set in a parallel universe where next to contemporary Earth, there exists a magic world called "the Weird", separated by a lawless buffer region known as "the Edge". The characters are marginialized and living in rural poverty, contrasting it with other urban fantasy of the era. The series is now finished and consists of four novels published across 2009-2012.

In 2011, the Andrews published the novella "Alphas: Origins" in the Berkley anthology Angels of Darkness. The story overlapped with the Edge universe, focusing on the Alphas alluded to in Bayou Moon. It was intended as the beginning of a new series, however, the story was not well received by fans and the authors did not continue. The novella was published as a standalone in 2016 by Ace.

In 2012, while editing Magic Rises, book 6 in the then-seven-book Kate Daniels series, the authors realized they could not adequately wrap up the story in one book. They had recently published the final entry in The Edge series, and were receiving feedback from fans that it was not a satisfying conclusion. They approached Ace about continuing the series, and, in early 2013, signed a deal for books 8-10.

=== Hidden Legacy and The Innkeeper Chronicles (2013-2018) ===
Concurrent with the Kate Daniels deal, they announced a second with Avon Books for the first three books of a new series which would become Hidden Legacy.

Their relationship with Avon began when Ilona and Gordon were introduced to editor Erika Tsang at a Romantic Times convention. The process moved quickly, and they had signed the contract before fully conceiving the story. They created a large family for their heroine at the suggestion of a Romantic Times reviewer; this choice was at least partially wish fulfillment, as neither of them come from large families.

The series, titled Hidden Legacy, is urban fantasy and contemporary fantasy romance, set in a parallel universe, where the world is ruled by dynasties of families with magic powers called Houses. The story follows the daughters of the seemingly low-magic Baylor family who run their family's detective agency in Houston, Texas.

Ilona has said that Burn For Me, the first book of the series, has its roots in previous short stories: they first explored the idea of hereditary magic and powerful families in "Of Swine and Roses" (which was eventually published in 2015 as part of the anthology Small Magics). The stories of the Kinsmen universe explored themes of romance and humans enhanced with magic.

In September 2012, they began sharing serialized fiction on their blog: Clean Sweep, a science fiction and urban fantasy novel, and the first in The Innkeeper Chronicles series. The story follows Dina Demille, who operates a bed and breakfast, Gertrude Hunt. The Inn is secretly an intergalactic rest stop for extraterrestrial visitors, and itself a living entity that responds to Dina's command. The novel was self-published in its completed form in December 2013. The following The Innkeeper Chronicles novels were all serialized; the series is ongoing, though as of February 2026, plans for the next novel had not yet been announced.

When the Andrews first began sharing serialized works, they were advised not to continue, due to the constraints on editing and the potential impact on their income due to giving work away for free. However, they continued sharing chapters as they wrote them; the serializations became a major draw to their blog, and the series is the bestselling of all their works.

In 2018, they extended with Avon for three more Hidden Legacy books.

=== Self publication (2018-2023) ===
In 2018, the final book in the Kate Daniels series, Magic Triumphs, was published by Ace. That same year, the Andrews began expanding the universe via self publication, starting with Iron and Magic, a paranormal romance focusing on the villain Hugh D'Ambray.

The book originated as an April Fool's joke in 2015, when the authors posted a fake blurb and book cover for a romance novel starring Hugh. The response was overwhelming, and they eventually decided to write the book, modifying their plans for Magic Triumphs to accommodate the change in Hugh's character.

They returned to the universe again in 2020, writing a novel about Julie, Kate Daniels's adopted daughter. The story was serialized on their blog, inspired by a nurse working in New York City during the COVID-19 pandemic, who requested "something to look forward to"; in it, Julie cannot return home to her family, mirroring the reality of the time. They self-published the novel in 2021 as Blood Heir, using a print on demand release strategy. The novel was an instant success, reaching #5 on The New York Times Best Seller list and #2 on USA Today's Best-selling Booklist. As a result, Ilona and Gordon announced they would take a year off from traditional publishing to focus on self publishing, as their audience was now large enough to make it financially sustainable.

In 2022, they published the last contracted book in the Hidden Legacy series, Ruby Fever. The novel was challenging to write; at one point, Ilona referred to the draft as "the Awful Book". The novel was released while they were working on Sweep of the Heart, the next Innkeeper Chronicles novel and another narratively complex story. Ilona described their state of mind at the time as "no brains left."

In 2023 they returned to familiar territory by expanding on Kate's story in Magic Tides and Magic Claims, following Kate and her mate, Curran, after they move to Wilmington, North Carolina seeking a fresh start. The Wilmington books were not serialized; the authors developed and wrote the first book, Magic Tides, entirely in secret, including from their literary agent who handles the release of their self-published works.

They idea for a Kate follow-up originated in early April 2022 after a discussion between Ilona and Gordon about their own Happily Ever After, which led Ilona to consider what Kate and Curran's would look like. In September of that year, Ilona was inspired to write a short story about Kate and Curran post-Atlanta; when she shared the idea with Gordon and her friend and fellow writer Jeaniene Frost, they doubted it would stay short story length. The final result, Magic Claims, was finished five weeks later with 40,000 words, qualifying it as a short novel.

=== Maggie the Undying (2024-present) ===
In 2021, Ilona began posting snippets of a new story, which would become known as "Maggie". They elaborated on the project in October the next year, revealing its genre as isekai, and citing Omniscient Reader's Viewpoint, My Next Life as a Villainess: All Routes Lead to Doom!, and From Bureaucrat to Villainess as inspirations.

The manuscript, now called Maggie the Undying, was acquired by Tor Books at auction in early 2024; this was leaked by publishing channels and shared via Reddit on July 17, triggering Tor to formally announce the deal that day, thus signaling the duo's return to traditional publishing.

Editing Maggie proved to be a demanding process; the novel had originated as a slice-of-life portal fantasy, and when it was put up for auction, it was in a completed, edited form. However, after being acquired by Tor, the authors and publisher realized the novel fit into the epic fantasy genre and needed more development. The final edit was accepted March 19, 2025, over a year after the initial acquisition.

Maggie the Undying, now the name of the series, is about a young woman transported into the world of her favorite—but unfinished—book series. She quickly learns she cannot die; instead, she is resurrected. The deal with Tor included two additional books, and the series is planned as a trilogy. The first book in the series, This Kingdom Will Not Kill Me, was published on March 31, 2026.

In early January 2025, as they were finishing edits on This Kingdom Will Not Kill Me, the authors began to post snippets of the sequel to Iron and Magic, a paranormal romance about the Kate Daniels villain Hugh d'Ambray. However, they soon realized the work wasn't suitable for serialization due to the complexity of wrapping up the plot lines, as the series was intended as a duology.

Needing a self-published release that year, Ilona announced in early April 2025 that they were working on a new novella. The following week, the first installment of its serialization was published on their blog. The completed work was released as The Inheritance with NYLA on August 12, 2025.

The Inheritance was written specifically to be serialized and originally intended as a standalone. The scope of the initial story expanded, however, and a sequel is now in the works; the series is called Breach Wars.

Breach Wars is a contemporary science fantasy series set in an Earth where portals to other worlds, called breaches, appeared a decade earlier, serving as gateways for invading space monsters. Humans have adapted by going on the offensive: creating a guild system to neutralize the breaches before the monsters can amass, then mining for resources. The story was inspired by LitRPG, but stars a middle-aged, female protagonist. The world of Breach Wars overlaps with that of The Innkeeper Chronicles.

In November 2026, the duo announced the second book in the Maggie the Undying trilogy: This Crown Will Not Rule Me, planned to release in September 2027.

== Works ==
=== Kate Daniels (2007–2018) ===
- Magic Bites, 2007
- Magic Burns, 2008
- Magic Strikes, 2009
  - Magic Mourns (Novella), 2009
- Magic Bleeds, 2010
  - Magic Dreams (Novella), 2011
- Magic Slays, 2011
  - Gunmetal Magic, 2012
- Magic Rises, 2013
- Magic Breaks, 2014
  - Magic Steals (Novella), 2014
- Magic Shifts, 2014
  - Magic Stars (Novella), 2015
- Magic Binds, 2016
- Magic Triumphs, 2018

=== The Kinsmen Universe (2009–2021) ===
- Silent Blade (Novella), June 2009
- Silver Shark (Novella), April 2011
- The Kinsmen Universe (Anthology), August 2018
- Fated Blades (Novella), November 2021

=== The Edge (2009–2012) ===
==== Novels ====
- On the Edge, September 2009
- Bayou Moon, September 2010
- Fate's Edge, November 2011
- Steel's Edge, December 2012

==== Short Story ====
- "George and Jack in School"

==== Alphas (spin off) ====
- Alphas: Origins (Novella), April 2016
- "Lucas and Karina Have a Family" (short story)

=== The Innkeeper Chronicles (2013-) ===
- Clean Sweep, December 2013
- Sweep in Peace, November 2015
- One Fell Sweep, December 2016
- Sweep of the Blade, July 2019
  - Sweep with Me (Novella), January 2020
- Sweep of the Heart, December 2022

=== Hidden Legacy (2014–2022) ===
- Burn for Me, October 2014
- White Hot, May 2017
- Wildfire, July 2017
  - Diamond Fire (Novella), November 2018
- Sapphire Flames, August 2019
- Emerald Blaze, August 2020
- Ruby Fever, August 2022
  - Beast Business (Novella), January 2026

=== Kate Daniels Universe (2018– ) ===
- Iron Covenant
  - Iron and Magic, 2018
- Aurelia Ryder
  - Blood Heir, 2021
- Wilmington Years
  - Magic Tides, 2023
  - Magic Claims, 2023
- Roman's Chronicles
  - Sanctuary, 2024

=== Breach Wars (2025- ) ===
- The Inheritance (Novella), August 2025

=== Maggie the Undying (2026- ) ===
- This Kingdom Will Not Kill Me, March 2026
- This Crown Will Not Rule Me, forthcoming, September 2027

=== Short Stories ===
- "The Case of a Lost Dog", Aphelion Webzine, December 1998
- "Night of Kupalo", Flash Me Magazine, October 2004
- “Questing Beast”, Andromeda Spaceways Inflight Magazine, June 2006

== Reception ==
Kirkus Reviews has praised Ilona Andrews, saying the "magical worldbuilding is brilliant and compelling" and "[their] imaginative use of magical personalities and traits is spellbinding". In 2024, Time Magazine called them "a renowned name in the paranormal romance world."

In 2018, eleven years after the original publication of Magic Bites, Reactor called the novel "an iconic urban fantasy". USA Today called the series "a must-read" and praised it for improving as it progressed. The sixth Kate Daniels novel, Magic Rises, reached the number one spot on The New York Times Mass Market Bestseller's List. The final installment, Magic Triumphs, climbed to #2 on Combined Print & E-Book Fiction and #5 on USA Today's Best-selling Booklist.

The conclusion for The Edge series, Steel's Edge, was less positively reviewed. Liz Bourke, writing for Reactor, was careful not to "discommend" the novel, but called it "odd [...] in terms of structure, and hectically paced." She lauded the main characters as "two of the most interesting, well-rounded and human characters yet to emerge within the Edge series". Frieda Murray, for Booklist, complimented the "well-drawn" characters and found the plot "standard" but engaging. Overall she recommended that new readers start the series elsewhere, labeling the novel "somewhat of a letdown".

Locus reviewed the first three volumes of the Innkeeper Chronicles positively, calling it "a charming mix of action, character-based funny bits, and the occasional heartwarming moment".

This Kingdom Will Not Kill Me, their first epic fantasy novel, was well-received by reviewers. For Library Journal, Kristi Chadwick called it "a love letter to fantasy", and Laura Hubbard, writing for BookPage, complimented its "snappy prose and imaginative world building". For Grimdark Magazine, Esmay Rosalyne remarked that explanation of lore early in the first half of the novel pulled her out of the story, but recommended it as "messy, dark, unexpectedly addictive". The novel appeared at #9 on The New York Times Best Seller List for Combined Print and E-Book Fiction, #10 in Hardcover Fiction, and #14 on USA Today's Best-Selling Booklist.

=== Awards ===
Year	Work	Award	Category	Result	Ref
2008	Magic Burns	Romantic Times	Urban Fantasy Novel	Won	
2009	On the Edge	Romantic Times	Contemporary Paranormal Romance	Won	
2009	Magic Strikes	Romantic Times	Urban Fantasy Protagonist	Nominated	
2010	Bayou Moon	Romantic Times	Paranormal Romance	Nominated	
2010	Magic Bleeds	Romantic Times	Urban Fantasy Novel	Won	
2011	Fate's Edge	Romantic Times	Paranormal Romance	Nominated	
2011	Magic Slays	Romantic Times	Urban Fantasy Novel	Nominated	
2011	Silver Shark	Romantic Times	Indie Press Paranormal/Fantasy/Futuristic	Nominated	
2011	Magic Slays	Goodreads Choice Awards	Paranormal Fantasy	Nominated—5th	
2011	-	Goodreads Choice Awards	Favorite Author	Nominated—2nd	
2012	Gunmetal Magic	Romantic Times	Shapeshifter Romance	Won	
2012	Steel's Edge	Romantic Times	Paranormal Worldbuilding	Won	
2013	Magic Rises	Romantic Times	Urban Fantasy Novel	Nominated	
2013	Magic Rises	Goodreads Choice Awards	Favorite Paranormal Fantasy	Nominated—6th	
2013	Gunmetal Magic	Audie Awards	Paranormal	Nominated	
2014	Magic Breaks	Romantic Times	Urban Fantasy Novel	Won	
2014	Burn For Me	Romantic Times	Paranormal Worldbuilding	Nominated	
2014	Magic Breaks	Goodreads Choice Awards	Favorite Fantasy	Nominated—9th	
2015	Magic Shifts	Romantic Times	Urban Fantasy Novel	Nominated	
2015	Magic Shifts	Goodreads Choice Awards	Favorite Fantasy	Nominated—4th	
2016	-	Romantic Times	Career Achievement - Urban Fantasy	Won	
2016	Sweep in Peace	Romantic Times	Digital or Self-Published Urban Fantasy	Nominated	
2016	Magic Binds	Romantic Times	Urban Fantasy	Nominated	
2016	Magic Binds	Goodreads Choice Awards	Favorite Fantasy	Nominated—7th	
2017	Wildfire	Romantic Times	Paranormal Romance	Nominated	
2017	One Fell Sweep	Romantic Times	Futuristic Romance	Nominated	
2017	One Fell Sweep	Goodreads Choice Awards	Favorite Fantasy	Nominated—6th	
2018	Iron and Magic	Goodreads Choice Awards	Favorite Fantasy	Nominated—5th	
2018	Magic Triumphs	Goodreads Choice Awards	Favorite Fantasy	Nominated—16th	
2019	Sapphire Flames	Goodreads Choice Awards	Favorite Romance	Nominated—5th	
2020	Emerald Blaze	Goodreads Choice Awards	Favorite Romance	Nominated—15th	
2023	Clean Sweep	Audie Awards	Audio Drama	Nominated	
2024	Hidden Legacy: Sapphire Flames, Emerald Blaze, Ruby Fever	Geffen Award	Translated Fantasy Book	Won	
2026	This Kingdom Will Not Kill Me	Goodreads Choice Awards	Favorite Fantasy	Nominated	

== Adaptations ==
The Kate Daniels series and the existing Innkeeper Chronicles novels have been adapted by Graphic Audio. An adaptation of the Hidden Legacy series is in progress; the adaptation for the first book, Burn For Me, was released in April 2025.

In 2022, the novel Clean Sweep was adapted into a web comic by Tapas. The comic has since been published in two print volumes.

== Personal lives ==
The Gordons live in Texas with their dogs and cats. They have two grown children.

They are enthusiastic consumers of media, including books, animation, and computer games. Ilona enjoys crocheting and knitting, posting updates on her projects on their blog. Gordon is a fan of paranormal and crime TV shows.
