= Shroud (Tchaikovsky novel) =

2025 science fiction novel by Adrian Tchaikovsky

- Author: Adrian Tchaikovsky
- Language: English
- Genre: Science Fiction
- Published: 25 February 2025
- Publisher: Tor Books
- Publication place: United Kingdom
- Pages: 436 (Hardcover)
- ISBN: 9781035013791

Shroud is a 2025 science fiction novel by Adrian Tchaikovsky. It concerns the discovery of alien life on a lightless moon, and the survival of two human scientists as they are trapped in this hostile environment.

== Plot ==
In the future, Earth has survived a population bottleneck. Humanity has expanded into interstellar space. Companies known as Concerns are focused on relentless resource extraction and expansion, in an attempt to reduce the likelihood of future extinction. The crew of the Garveneer is sent to investigate and prospect a moon named Shroud. Shroud is a pitch-black, high-gravity moon with a thick atmosphere. Despite the lack of visible light, it is highly active on most parts of the electromagnetic spectrum.

The Concern builds a space elevator on the surface of Shroud. Drone footage reveals the presence of alien life. Scientist Juna Ceelander and her coworkers are gradually pushed to their limits by corporate oversight. Despite safety concerns, the team prepares for the possibility of a crewed mission to the surface of Shroud. Engineer Mai Ste Etienne designs a pod which can survive the harsh environment of Shroud. The Garveneer collides with a shipment; Juna and Mai shelter in a pod and crash-land on Shroud. Their boss, Oswerry Bartokh, survives in a separate pod.

Large native creatures surround the pods. Juna names them the "Shrouded". Mai and Juna begin a series of rudimentary communications through electromagnetic waves, revealing that the creatures may be intelligent. The creatures break into Bartokh’s pod, killing him. Mai and Juna flee, pursued by several Shrouded. They are attacked by another creature, but the Shrouded intervene and assist them.

The story shifts to the point of view of the Shrouded. The Shrouded is a hive mind; the creatures seen by Juna and Mai are parts of it, not independent beings. The Shrouded discovers the landing pods, which it names "the Stranger". It believes them to be two segments of a hive mind like itself. It opens Bartokh's pod, accidentally killing him. Realizing its mistake, it sends a part of itself to escort the surviving pod. This part assists the Stranger after it is attacked by a native predator.

Mai and Juna journey towards the space elevator, which is their only hope for survival. Along their journey, they are accompanied by segments of the Shrouded. Despite their efforts, misunderstandings persist and communication remains highly limited. The Shrouded and the pod experience damage and numerous near-fatal events, both from other native fauna and from the inimicable conditions of the moon itself. The Shrouded begins to build airships based on human drones, proving to the humans that it is intelligent. Mai and Juna take one of the airships, using it to shorten their journey to the space elevator. Despite significant damage to the pod and the psychological toll of their experiences, Mai and Juna reach the space elevator and are rescued. Shortly thereafter, the Shrouded finds human-made electronic cables and learns more about the nature of electricity.

Back on the Garveneer, Mai and Juna expect to be greeted as heroes. Instead, the Concern decrees that the native Shrouded do not allow any potential for profit. Therefore, the moon should be mined for resources without further scientific study. On the moon, the Shrouded uses human technology to fuse parts of its hive mind into a greater whole. It begins dismantling the mining operation and interfering with company profits. Eventually, it learns to use fiber optics to interfere with human communications. Juna and Mai are ordered to fix the problem. Using information learned from them, the Concern plans to exterminate the Shrouded. The Concern sends an army of drones to the surface of Shroud. When the drones return, they begin firing on the Garveneer's human crew, killing many people. The Shrouded has used its new knowledge to coopt humanity's weaponry. It shuts down the Garveneer, trapping the surviving humans on board.

The Shrouded does not truly understand humanity, since human bodies do not emit electromagnetic signals in the same way that Shroud life does. Mai and Juna design a brain scanner and install it into the pod. Juna returns to the surface of Shroud, allowing her brain scans to be transmitted to the Shrouded in the hope that it will understand. The Shrouded finds the pod and begins investigating Juna’s mind.

In an epilogue, the survivors aboard the Garveneer receive a message from the Shrouded, indicating that it now understands human language and wishes to communicate.

== Major themes ==
Zorica Lola Jelic wrote about the novel for SFRA Review, commenting on its themes of humanity and colonization. Jelic stated that " For every colonizer throughout history, the category of humanity is stripped down to the notion that white man’s superiority implies morality." Similarly, the crew of the Garveneer is not allowed to contemplate the potential existence of non-human intelligence, as this would interfere with their ability to strip-mine and profit from Shroud. Despite its lack of human emotions, the Shrouded is portrayed as "morally higher" than humanity. In this way, Tchaikovsky critiques modern-day people, portraying a future in which humanity fails to evolve enough to safely make first contact with intelligent life. Finally, Jelic drew a comparison between the rapid learning curve of the Shrouded and the pace of development of artificial intelligence. In Jelic's view, Tchaikovsky is asking "whether we should create more sophisticated AI machines when we are morally so corrupt that we do not recognize the responsibility that goes with such an endeavor."

== Reception and awards ==
A review in Kirkus Reviews noted the similarities to Tchaikovksy's 2024 novel Alien Clay, particularly "a repressive government whose strong resistance to an equitable first contact is met by potentially stronger resistance from the alien contactee(s)." Despite the structural similarities, the review felt that Shroud was well-crafted and concluded that "all retreads should be this good." Russell Letson of Locus also noted the similarities to Tchaikovsky's previous work, calling Shroud a companion piece to Alien Clay. Letson wrote that Tchaikovsky's latest work continues to explore the themes of "what it’s like to live or work at the bottom of a totalizing authoritarian pyramid" and the contrast between human constructions and the natural universe.

Tobias Carroll of Reactor called the novel "Adrian Tchaikovsky's remix album" and compared it to both Alien Clay and Elder Race. Carroll stated that "Shroud is a compelling novel in its own right, but in tandem with these other books, it provides something of a map of what Tchaikovsky has been thinking about lately." The review further examined the way in which humans and alien life misunderstand each other, drawing comparisons to a scene from The Hitchhiker's Guide to the Galaxy in which aliens believe cars to be intelligent life. Similarly, the Shrouded misunderstands the situation in the novel, believing that the escape pod is an intelligent creature rather than a machine piloted by human occupants. Carroll praised the subtle misunderstandings, which "never quite cross the line into broad comedy".

Alexandra Pierce praised the central journey of Mai and Juna across the surface of Shroud, calling it "utterly riveting and award-worthy". Pierce also praised the inclusion of chapters narrated from the alien's perspective. The review contrasts Tchaikovsky's idea of alien life with other science fiction works such as Star Trek and Doctor Who, in which universal translators make communication easy. Instead, "Tchaikovsky has asked what would make alien biology as little like human biology as possible ... and proceeded from there." Pierce concluded that "Shroud is the best first-contact novel I have read in years."

Year	Award	Category	Result	Ref.
2026	Aldiss Award	—	Pending	
2026	Hugo Award	Novel	Finalist	
2026	Locus Award	Science Fiction Novel	Finalist	
