= Expert Systems (series) =

Series of novellas by Adrian Tchaikovsky

- Cover art for The Expert System's Brother, the first novella in the series
- The Expert System's Brother; The Expert System's Champion
- Author: Adrian Tchaikovsky
- Country: United Kingdom
- Language: English
- Genre: Science fiction
- Publisher: Tordotcom
- Published: 17 Jul 2018 (Book 1); 26 Jan 2021 (Book 2)
- No. of books: 2

Expert Systems is a series of science fiction novellas by Adrian Tchaikovsky. It comprises two entries: The Expert System's Brother (2018) and The Expert System's Champion (2021). The series is set in a far future in which humankind has lost much of its history. The characters rely on "expert systems" for technological and social guidance.

== Plot ==
=== The Expert System's Brother ===
The story takes place on a world settled by humanity hundreds of years ago. Humans have gradually lost knowledge of their history and live with limited technology. Village leaders may be possessed by "ghosts", giving them defined roles such as architect, lawgiver, or physician. The spirits’ hosts are chosen by the tree that controls the village; ghosts are injected into humans via the venom of specialized wasps. These possessions are understood by the characters to be supernatural, but the reader understands that they are remnants of technology left by the planet’s original settlers.

Handry is a citizen of the village of Aro. When Handry is thirteen, a man is banished from the village and is sentenced to Severance. This biochemical process causes the subject to become unable to eat normal food. Severed people will eventually die from starvation or poisoning. Handry accidentally touches the Severance potion, becoming partially Severed himself. After this incident, he is often ill and has difficulty eating without vomiting. The community begins to view him with distrust.

Three years later, Aro’s doctor dies. The village tree chooses Handry’s sister Melory as the new host for the doctor’s ghost. Handry asks the doctor/Melory to heal him. Instead, the ghost deems him incurable and orders his full Severance. Melory fights the ghost’s influence for long enough to allow Handry to flee safely.

Handry wanders through the wilderness, stealing food and supplies from other communities. He eventually meets a Severed man named Shaskin, who has somehow survived without starving. Shaskin considers himself to be a priest and believes that Severed people represent true humanity. Shaskin brings Handry to the "house of their ancestors," which is a grounded spaceship. He tells Handry that the original planetary settlers could not eat the food on their new world; instead of changing the world, they modified themselves. They created the "ghosts", also called "expert systems". These systems were initially intended as guides, but human culture has gradually deteriorated and they are now subservient to their systems instead of using them as tools. Shaskin believes that their ancestors made terrible mistakes by abandoning their identities as "true" humans.

Melory leaves Aro, hoping that she can fight her expert system and convince it to heal Handry. She tracks Handry to the spaceship and is captured. Shaskin plans to force the ghost-doctor to teach him Severance, which he will use on all people to return them to their natural state. A prison guard attempts to beat Melory; Handry stabs the guard to death. Handry rescues his sister from her cell. Melory uses her expert system to take control of the spaceship’s computers. She uses a robot to kill Sharskin.

Melory and Handry take control of the ship. They recognize that Sharskin’s beliefs were flawed, but not entirely wrong. They plan to share the knowledge of the spaceship with other villages in the future.

=== The Expert System's Champion ===
The story alternates between past and present.

In the first timeline, scientists arrive at a new colony world. The world is hostile to human life, often provoking severe allergic reactions. The primary expedition focuses on the mainland, while the Sister Expedition focuses on tidal biomes. The Sister Expedition campsite is destroyed by large mollusk-like creatures. Bain, the leader of the Sister Expedition, tries to hold his group together. Scientists discover that the large mollusks have a specialized organ inside their shells. This organ allows them to interface with Earth biology without toxicity or allergy. Bain’s group, cut off from the primary expedition, plans to use the mollusks as a survival tool.

The main story begins ten years after the events of “The Expert System’s Brother.” Handry now leads the Order of Cain, which accepts people who are Severed from their villages. The Order performs services such as fighting off wildlife; in return, they are fitted into the cultural ecosystem of the villages.

The village of Jileno begins producing a new form of Expert System called Champions. These Champions are humans with genetically modified wasp companions. The Champions seek to exterminate members of the Order. Handry negotiates with the Champion Amorket. Meanwhile, creatures called brackers begin attacking humans. Handry and the Order are called to fight them off. Handry and Melory learn that the citizens of Tsuno have secretly been trading with the brackers, who are more intelligent than expected. The brackers, never previously violent, have destroyed the village of Portuno.

Handry witnesses as the brackers are attacked by “stone creatures”, which are the mollusks from Bain’s story. He realizes that the stone creatures have pushed the brackers out of their original environment, sparking conflict with humans. Handry and his companions capture a stone creature. They attack it and crack its shell. Inside, they find a human body. They infiltrate the stone creatures’ nesting grounds, where they find Bain.

Bain and the descendants of the Sister Expedition have been living in a symbiotic relationship with the mollusks, which protect the human bodies from the toxins of their new planet. They are no longer independent organisms, but have become merged with their mollusk hosts.

Handry and the Order escape from the mollusks with the help of brackers. Melory uses Amorket’s genetically programmed wasps to induce fear into the mollusks. Thereafter, they leave humanity in peace. Melory programs Amorket and the other Champions to tolerate the Order of Cain. Handry and Amorket reflect on their shared experiences before going their separate ways.

== Major themes ==
Paul Weimer of Reactor notes that The Expert System's Brother contains a discussion about the best way for humanity to form a relationship with a foreign environment. Each of the novella's major characters represents a different philosophy in this three-sided debate.

Do we adapt ourselves fully, as Melory has; reject the world we are faced with, as Sharskin counsels; or do we find a way to compromise, adapt, and belong, even as the world has partially rejected him, as in the case of Handry? This three way cross of points of view is tied to a spectrum of the three key characters’ relationships with science and technology: In the case of Melory, using technology blindly, and in fact being used by it. In the case of Sharskin, attempting to overwhelm it and suborn it to purposes never intended. And in the case of Handry himself, seeking to understand it.

Weimer further notes that the novella is participating in the "long genre conversation." Weimer defines this as "the idea that stories and novels are written in dialogue with each other, and their ideas." In Weimer's view, The Expert System's Brother is in dialogue with other works about colonization, such as Aurora by Kim Stanley Robinson, Flux by Stephen Baxter, and Surface Tension by James Blish.

== Reception ==
In a review for the first novella in the series, Adrienne Martini of Locus praised Tchaikovsky's complex worldbuilding despite a short page count. Martini notes that "Handry’s tale takes the shape of an archetypal coming-of-age structure, [but] what makes it compelling reading is the world Tchaikovsky has built." The review also praised the book's pacing, stating that the "mystery of how the system works and what the Severance does is the engine of this story – and it’s one that purrs right along thanks to Tchaikovsky’s skill." Also writing for Locus, Liz Bourke commented on the ways in which Tchaikovsky plays with genre expectations. According to the review, "the title of The Expert System’s Brother makes one expect a cyberpunk world, but the landscape initially seems like that of fantasy. Gradually, the reader becomes aware that what seems like a fantasy setting is in fact [sic] science fictional one..."

Paul Weimer of Reactor further commented on the blending of fantasy and science fiction elements within The Expert System's Brother. Weimer notes that the novella starts off with a setting reminiscent of a standard fantasy story: "Primitive village, strange customs, a young protagonist, and mention of ghosts set the reader onto the path of thinking that this is a fantasy tale. The protagonist accidentally performs a transgression that ostracizes him from the community, and eventually is exiled from the village of his birth to go on a journey of discovery across a fantastic and unknown landscape." Weimer then notes that the insertion of italicized phrases such as "Secondary decontamination onset" can clue the reader in on the fact that the story is meant to be a science fiction tale; gradually, as more information is revealed, the reader's sense of genre shifts.

Sandi Jones of School Library Journal recommended The Expert system's Brother for "mature fans of dystopian literature" and recommended it as "a worth addition to high school science fiction collections." Jones felt that Handry's first-person narration, which is styled "as if told in an oral tradition" might be off-putting for some readers, but that " the author compensates for it with the wonderfully evocative setting—full of trees, wasps, and strange monsters."

In a starred review, Publishers Weekly called The Expert System's Champion a "deliciously creepy sequel." The review praised the exploration of alien life, as well as the use of flashbacks. The review concluded that "Tchaikovsky's vision is bizarre, frightening, and wildly imaginative." The Southern Bookseller's Review called the sequel "a slow-build novella with a jaw-dropping plot twist."

Luke Burrage reviewed both novellas on an episode of Science Fiction Book Review Podcast. Burrage felt that the audiobook narrator Sean Grindell was not as good as Tchaikovsky himself when narrating his own stories. The episode discussed the ways in which both books are similar to Tchaikovsky's novella Elder Race; both settings are initially presented as fantasy worlds before the underlying science fiction elements are revealed. Burrage ultimately felt that Elder Race was a stronger work, but praised the body horror elements of the Expert Systems novellas. The host rated both works as 3.5 stars out of a possible 5 stars.
