= Morphotrophic =

2024 novel by Greg Egan

- Author: Greg Egan
- Language: English
- Genre: Science fiction, Hard science fiction
- Publication date: 9 April 2024
- Pages: 386
- ISBN: 978-1922240521

Morphotrophic is a science-fiction novel by Australian author Greg Egan, published in 2024. The novel describes a world with an alternative biology as well as how humans live with it and what crises arise with it.

== Plot ==
Following a different course of evolution, cytes, the analogues of cells, are not confined to a single organism, resulting in them being able to survive in their own. Shapes of organs are not decided by DNA, but so-called morphotypes, which are more complicated and still not fully understood. Among humans, there are Flourishers, who enjoy an unusual healthy and stable cyte population, as well as Swappers, who meet to exchange cytes. Since the latter is illegal, Swappers meet in secret and use pseudonyms.

Marla, a teenager, wakes up one day with one arm and one leg having disintegrated. Her beloved pet pig Geraldine is then dissolved for her to take a bath in its cytes. (Pigs like Geraldine are common pets for this purpose.) After recovery, Marla visits Ada Moss, a two-century old Flourisher, to ask for advice. Ada shows her a video of a pig giving birth to a lizard, indicating progress on the technology to manipulate cytes. Although the footage is perceived as fake by most of the public, similar videos continue to appear, one with a pig also birthing a rat. Ada, whose long life as a Flourisher has brought her wealth and an interest in cytes (which is explored in multiple chapters set a century prior), invites Marla to her Morphotype Institute. Meanwhile, Ruth Garland, a dedicated Swapper using Deborah as her pseudonym, meets Zaleh at a secret Swapper assembly and exchanges cytes with her. During the exchange, Deborah loses consciousness and fuses into Zaleh, unable to break free, but able to talk using Zaleh's mouth. Both seek medical advice together and the only solution seems to be Zaleh giving birth to Deborah, although her being born as a human cannot be guaranteed. A similar incident has already caused a fused being to be born as an animal and then be euthanized on its own wish. Zaleh and Deborah inside her search for help in the Morphotype Institute from Ada and Marla, which results in the birth of Deborah as a human baby, but with significant memory loss. With the new technology, the birth of morphotypes can now effectively be controlled. Deborah, now again Ruth, speaks to Zaleh over telephone, who reveals her real name to be Solmaz. Ruth and Solmaz then plan to meet.

Independently, Delia discovers how to change her own morphotype naturally and goes on a journey, transforming from a cat to a bird, a lizard and then finally a fox. She gives birth to a pup and decides to leave her human form behind and instead change into whatever will be needed to form their future.

== Background ==
Egan explains in the afterword, that "the premise of the novel [....] first came to [him] several years ago," but he "kept putting off writing it, because it seemed so outlandish and counterfactual," that he "wasn't sure how [he] could make it seem plausible." An article by Michael Levin about "their construction of 'xenobots': small assemblies of cells," which were "close [....] to the framework [he] was looking for" finally gave him the basis to start writing. He closes that "reality will always be more subtle and surprising than fiction."

== Reviews ==
Russell Letson wrote in Locus that "the novel’s story lines and genre categories are interestingly complicated." He praises the novel being filled with "much more fantastic motifs: shapeshifters, werebeasts, vampires, body-horror infestations, talking animals" and being interwoven with what he perceives as "Egan’s most persistent and primal interests: the nature of identity and the importance of cooperation in all things social." In particular he sees the biological premise as a "metaphor for larger eusocial/cooperative structures."

Russell Letson, in a Locus review of Adrian Tchaikovsky's Alien Clay, also published in 2024 and focussing on different biology, compared the novels as "uncanny echoes".
