= Ogres (novella) =

2022 novella by Adrian Tchaikovsky

- Author: Adrian Tchaikovsky
- Language: English
- Series: Terrible Worlds: Revolutions
- Release number: 3
- Genre: Science fiction
- Publisher: Solaris Books
- Publication date: 15 Mar 2022
- Publication place: United Kingdom
- Pages: 144
- ISBN: 9781786185303
- Preceded by: Firewalkers

Ogres is a 2022 novella by Adrian Tchaikovsky. It is the third entry in his Terrible Worlds: Revolutions series. It was a finalist for several science fiction and fantasy awards, including the Hugo Award and Locus Award.

== Plot ==
Torquell is the son of a village headman. Humanity lives under the rule of the Masters, a class of giant ogres. The local Master, Sir Peter Grimes, visits Torquell's village to assess taxes. Sir Peter's son Gerald threatens Torquell. Torquell punches Gerald, violating the law that no human may strike a Master. In retaliation, the ogres kill and eat Torquell's father. Torquell then kills Gerald with the same meat cleaver that butchered his father.

Torquell seeks shelter with Roben, an outlaw who lives in the forest. Torquell is betrayed by one of Roben's men and captured by an ogre bounty hunter. Torquell is taken to a prison, where he is beaten by Sir Peter. Before Sir Peter can kill Torquell, he is rescued by the wealthy ogress Baroness Isadora Lavaine. Isadora is a scientist who intends to study Torquell.

For the following years, Torquell serves as a member of Isadora's scientific staff. He is ostracized by Isadora's other human staff members, including the human chief of staff Minith. Minith believes that Torquell's lack of scientific background is a hindrance, and she resents Isadora's favoritism towards him. From Isadora, Torquell learns more of the world's history. In previous centuries, the world almost collapsed from overpopulation in an event known as the Brink. Some people were genetically engineered to be more docile and require fewer resources; these became the “Economic” class and Torquell's ancestors. The ruling class was left unchanged; these people became the Masters, or ogres. Isadora identifies Torquell as an example of atavism, meaning that he shows characteristics of unchanged humanity despite being descended from Economic stock. He flees from Isadora's household.

Torquell returns to his home village. He kills Sir Peter and reunites with Roben. Torquell and Roben's men form a small fighting force. They invade Sir Peter's estate, where they kill several mourners and burn down the mansion. This uprising grows into a larger rebellion in which the Economic class wages a guerrilla war against the ogre Masters. As the ragtag army sees more success on the battlefield, Isadora parleys with Torquell. She hopes to convince him that his rebellion is futile and will eventually be crushed by superior ogre technology. During their conversation, she reveals that previous generations of Masters committed genocide against the Economics in order to shrink the population into something more “manageable”. Isadora offers Torquell a compromise: in exchange for peace, he'll be recognized as a Master over the lands his army currently holds. Otherwise, the ogres will wipe out his rebellion. Torquell accepts her offer. Before the agreement is finalized, he and Isadora are poisoned by Minith. Minith portrays Torquell as a tragic revolutionary hero murdered by the ogres during a parley. Minith vows to continue the revolution.

== Style ==
The book is written in second person narration.

== Reception and awards ==
In a review for Grimdark Magazine, Angela Gualtieri wrote that "Ogres is classically Tchaikovsky with its interwoven complex themes, but also departs from his previous works into something more naturally dark and raw." Gualtieri noted that the novella makes the most of its short length, praising the narrative style and writing that "At no time do any of those characters step from the page to tell you what happened, but somehow the writer does." Publishers Weekly called the book a "twisty social satire" and wrote that "Readers with a bent for social commentary and solving puzzles will be doubly pleased."

Civilian Reader called the book "an intriguing, engaging examination of a whole swathe of human qualities — ambition, weakness, economics, and more." The review particularly praised the references to modern political systems, noting that "If you’re even vaguely observant of contemporary Western politics, you’ll see clear parallels." Adrienne Martini of Locus wrote that the book is "a cunning take on both fantasy tropes and heroes’ journeys. Tchaikovsky's hand is sure, even when it feels like the narrative is seconds away from slipping off of the rails."

Year	Award	Category	Result	Ref.
2022	BSFA Award	Short Fiction	Shortlisted	
2023	British Fantasy Award	Novella	Shortlisted	
2023	Hugo Award	Novella	Finalist	
2023	Locus Award	Novella	Finalist	
