= Dell (landform) =

Small secluded hollow

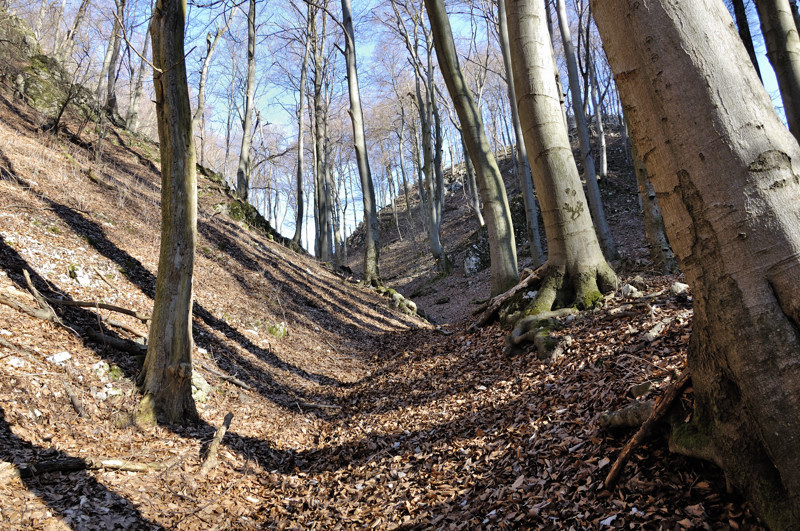
Dell in the Little Carpathians with a dry stream channel

In physical geography, a dell is a grassy hollow—or dried stream bed—often partially covered in trees. In literature, dells have pastoral connotations, frequently imagined as secluded and pleasant safe havens.

The word "dell" comes from the Old English word dell, which is related to the Old English word dæl, modern 'dale'. The term is sometimes used interchangeably with the word "dingle", although "dingle" specifically refers to deep ravines or hollows that are embowered with trees. The terms have also been combined to form examples of tautological placenames in Dingle Dell, Kent, and Dingle Dell Reserve, Auckland.

== In popular culture ==
- Rivendell – Fictional valley of Elves in J. R. R. Tolkien's Middle-earth - Tolkien's fictional Elvish locale.
- Derndingle - in The Lord of the Rings, the place in Fangorn Forest where the Entmoot is held.
- "The Farmer in the Dell" - an American folk song brought to United States by German immigrants.
- "This Lime-Tree Bower My Prison" - A poem by Samuel Taylor Coleridge, makes reference to a dell in lines 5-10.
- "Band of Brothers" - an HBO show that makes reference to a dell in a conversation in the 6th episode "Bastogne"
- "Bee Speaker" - the third novel in the 'Dogs of War' series of books makes reference to dells in chapter 64.

== Related places ==
- Hollywood Dell, Los Angeles
- Hollywood Bowl – Amphitheater in Los Angeles, California
- Matthiessen State Park – State park in Illinois, US
- Wisconsin Dells – Gorge on the Wisconsin River in Wisconsin, United States
- The Dell (Wellington, New Zealand) – A flat, sheltered lawn area with a stage, surrounded by steep hills

== See also ==
- Cirque – Amphitheatre-like valley formed by glacial erosion
- Coulee – Type of valley or drainage zone
- Glen – Name for valley commonly used in Ireland, Scotland and the Isle of Man
- U-shaped valley, also known as glaciated valley – Valleys formed by glacial scouring
- Gully – Landform created by running water and/or mass movement eroding sharply into soil
- Canyon, also known as Gorge – Deep chasm between cliffs
- Valley – Low area between hills, often with a river running through it
