= Ironclads (novella) =

2017 novella by Adrian Tchaikovsky

- Author: Adrian Tchaikovsky
- Cover artist: Maz Smith
- Language: English
- Series: Terrible Worlds: Revolutions
- Release number: 1
- Genre: Science fiction
- Publisher: Solaris Books
- Publication date: 7 Nov 2017
- Publication place: United Kingdom
- ISBN: 9781786180872
- Followed by: Firewalkers

Ironclads is a 2017 dystopian science fiction novella by Adrian Tchaikovsky. It is the first entry in his Terrible Worlds: Revolutions series.

== Plot ==
In a near-future world dominated by corporate interests, Scions are the heirs of wealthy and powerful families. Scions wear advanced armor that renders them nearly invulnerable on the battlefield. Jerome Speling, the Scion of a major American family, disappears during a military deployment in Sweden. A small squad of American soldiers is dispatched to locate him. The team is led by Theodore “Ted” Regan and includes his fellow soldiers Sturgeon and Franken. They are joined by Lawes, a British mercenary, and Cormoran, a corporate representative.

The squad crosses into occupied Sweden and investigates the site of Speling’s disappearance, where they discover evidence suggesting the involvement of Finnish special forces. Their movements attract the attention of Russian mercenaries and a mechanized unit known as a Ruud, forcing them into repeated engagements. The group later encounters Nordic resistance fighters, including a Finn named Viina, who offers to guide them to Speling.

Their search leads them to a castle controlled by the corporation LMK, where Speling was last seen. Regan, Sturgeon, and Lawes infiltrate the castle and discover Speling’s Scion suit, but not Speling himself. Lawes betrays the unit, and the soldiers are captured by LMK forces. Cormoran, Franken, and Viina mount a rescue; during the escape, Lawes is killed while both Franken and Viina are badly wounded. The Finnish fighters save Franken’s life, implanting him with experimental modifications in the process.

Regan realizes that the squad has been set up to fail. With the aid of the Finns, the survivors track Speling to Stockholm, where LMK has transferred him. Upon arrival, they are taken into custody by corporate security forces rather than national authorities. They meet Speling, who reveals that he never went missing. Instead, he traveled to Stockholm voluntarily to negotiate a corporate settlement to the war. The mission to retrieve him was a cover story, intended to eliminate Regan’s unit and lend credibility to Speling’s supposed disappearance.

The enhancements implanted in Franken allow him to access and disrupt Speling’s systems. He uncovers LMK’s plan to overthrow the Swedish government and replace it with a corporate-controlled puppet regime. In the ensuing confrontation, Franken sacrifices himself to assassinate Speling. Regan, Cormoran, and Sturgeon are rescued in the aftermath.

Following the mission, the squad members go their separate ways. Sturgeon chooses asylum in Sweden, Cormoran enters Russian service, and Regan returns to the United States.

== Major themes ==
Patrick Mahon called the novel "a pretty brutal satire on the military-industrial complex..." In the novel, poor Americans are disenfranchised because the children of poor families are more likely to die in the war. This means that large military losses will not affect American military strategy. Mahon compares this to wars of the Middle Ages, in which "wars were started and continued by monarchs and the aristocracy, none of whom went to battle unless they had superior weapons and heavy protective armour, while most of the actual fighting was done by poorly-armed, poorly-armoured and poorly-trained serfs."

== Style ==
The novella is written in first person and narrated by Sergeant Ted Regan. Patrick Mahon described the tone as "informal" and "conversational ... spiced up by the frequent f-bombs that are an inevitable consequence of trying to reflect the language of soldiers under fire."

== Publication history ==
Ironclads was published by Solaris Books on 7 Nov 2017 as a limited-edition hardback. The ebook was released on 31 Dec 2017. An omnibus edition of Terrible Worlds: Revolutions was published 23 May 2025.

== Reception and awards ==
Tadiana Jones of fantasyliterature.com gave the novella four out of five stars, calling it an "imaginative, fast-paced military science fiction ... with a large side of social commentary." Jones wrote that the narrator was a "fairly standard military sort of character" but that the side characters such as Comoran were interesting. The review praised the novel as both a "straight-up military SF adventure" as well as its deeper thematic content.

Liz Bourke of Locus praised Tchaikovsky's worldbuilding, calling it "frighteningly plausible in some respects." Of the Scions, Bourke commented that they are "an extension of the ways in which the upper classes have always been shielded from the kind of consequences that predominantly afflict ordinary people." Bourke concluded that the book is "short, sharp, and not as depressing as its premise might suggest. It’s a solid piece of near-future military science fiction."

Patrick Mahon of SF Crow's Nest called the book "an exciting military SF novella which dramatises current conflicts between rich and poor, right and left, public and private in a brutally satirical fashion." Ed Fortune of Starburst called the book "a rapid and addictive read, very much the page-turner."

Kirkus Reviews listed Ironclads as one of its best science fiction and fantasy reads of November 2017.
