= One Day All This Will Be Yours =

2021 science fiction novella by Adrian Tchaikovsky

- Author: Adrian Tchaikovsky
- Audio read by: Adrian Tchaikovsky
- Language: English
- Series: Terrible Worlds: Destinations
- Release number: 2
- Genre: Science fiction
- Published: 2 Mar 2021
- Publisher: Solaris Books
- Publication place: United Kingdom
- Pages: 144
- ISBN: 9781781088746
- Preceded by: Walking to Aldebaran
- Followed by: And Put Away Childish Things

One Day All This Will Be Yours is a 2019 science fiction novella by Adrian Tchaikovsky. It is the second entry in his Terrible Worlds: Destinations series.

== Plot ==
An unnamed narrator lives on a farm at the end of time. A time traveler named Rigo arrives, hoping to escape a nuclear war. The narrator feeds Rigo to his pet allosaurus, Miffly. He then goes back in time to change history, preventing Rigo from ever arriving at the farm.

The narrator discusses the Causality War. At some point in history, a world war occurred. Nations went back in time to change history to their advantage. Eventually, the nations which began the war were edited out of existence. This left a large number of rogue time agents stranded in the past, hoping to create futures which could no longer exist. Eventually, time travelers damaged Time itself, fracturing it into a series of small pocket realities. The narrator, once a soldier in the war, has pledged to kill all time travelers to prevent another Causality War from occurring. When someone invents time travel and goes to the future, the narrator catches them at his farm. He then kills them and edits time to ensure that no one from their reality can invent time travel again.

Time travelers Weldon and Smantha arrive on his farm. They reveal that they are the narrator's own descendants. He visits their home, which is a utopia. When he returns to his farm, he swears that he will never have children, thus ensuring that the utopians will never exist.

When the narrator returns from a trip to the past, he finds that his future wife has visited the farm in his absence. The narrator and the woman, Zoe, play a cat-and-mouse game in which they try to kill one another. Zoe also hates their predestined future and wishes to prevent the utopians from existing.

The narrator goes back in time to muster a group of villains to assist in killing Zoe. His recruits includes Edward Teach, Elizabeth Bathory, and Stalin. Zoe recruits her own entourage, which includes William the Conqueror, three versions of Jack the Ripper, Adolf Hitler, and another version of Stalin. The historical villains fight, much to the enjoyment of Zoe and the narrator. The villains kill each other. Hitler, the last man standing, is eaten by Miffly. Zoe and the narrator agree to a truce.

More time travelers arrive; Zoe and the narrator work together to kill them. Gradually, they grow fonder of each other. The utopians return; they report that the probability of their future existing is declining rapidly. Zoe and the narrator still refuse to settle down together. Multiple copies of Weldon and Smantha begin harassing the narrator and Zoe, hoping to convince them to have sex before the probability of a future utopia declines to zero.

The narrator brings Zoe to the epicenter of the Causality War, where Time has been mangled into beautiful and horrifying pieces. They decide to kill the utopians. They plan a heist into a shattered fragment of time to retrieve a causality bomb. When they arrive, the bomb is missing. They return to the farm, where they find Weldon and Smantha waiting for them. The utopians admit that they took the bomb. They use it to destroy the narrator's farm and ensure their own continued existence. The narrator and Zoe escape in a time machine, promising to continue their fight against the utopians.

== Reception and awards ==
Publishers Weekly gave the book a starred review, calling it humorous and sharp-edged. The review praised the story's combination of acerbity and comedy, concluding that "this time-looped dramedy is as funny as it is thought-provoking."

Tadiana Jones of fantasyliterature.com gave the novel four and a half stars out of a possible five. The review called the novella "wildly intelligent and imaginative," praising the black humor. Jones particularly praised the scene involving historical villains fighting, as well as Tchaikovsky's treatment of time travel and paradoxes. The review criticized the ending as too abrupt, "with reams of hanging threads and no real attempt at a wrap-up." Despite this criticism, Jones gave the book a strong recommendation for fans of "dark, flippant humor."

In a review for Science Fiction Book Review Podcast, Luke Burrage and Juliane Kunzendorf commented on the novella's choice of title. Burrage stated that "the funnier the book, the longer the title is allowed to be." The podcast compared the premise of the book to This Is How You Lose the Time War by Amal El-Mohtar and Max Gladstone, stating that Tchaikovsky probably drew inspiration from the former. Burrage found Tchaikovsky's novella to be superior, stating that it showcases a more realistic way to lose a time war. The reviewers also felt that One Day All This Will Be Yours "leaned in" to the idea that time traveling soldiers must by psychopaths, rather than whitewashing the genocides involved in erasing entire timelines. Both hosts felt that the ending was too abrupt, commenting that the novella could have used 20 or 30 more pages. Both hosts awarded the novella four out of a possible five stars.

Elizabeth Tabler of Grimdark Magazine called the novella "brilliant and witty," praising Tchaikovsky's use of the novella format. The review praised the style of humor, stating that the "situations are hilarious and wild but do not stray into the ridiculous or uncomfortable."

Writing for Starburst, Laura Potier called the book "an absurdly funny, sharply written novella." The review praised the "darkly comical" tone, as well as the use of classic science fiction tropes such as time travel and paradoxes.
