= The Final Architecture =

Series of science fiction novels by Adrian Tchaikovsky

- Cover art for Shards of Earth, the first book in the series
- Shards of Earth; Eyes of the Void; Lords of Uncreation
- Author: Adrian Tchaikovsky
- Country: United Kingdom
- Language: English
- Publisher: Orbit Books; Tor Books
- Published: 27 May 2021 (Shards of Earth); 3 May 2022 (Eyes of the Void); 2 May 2023 (Lords of Uncreation)
- No. of books: 3

The Final Architecture is a series of science fiction novels by British writer Adrian Tchaikovsky. It contains the books Shards of Earth, Eyes of the Void, and Lords of Uncreation. The series focuses on a group of humans fighting against the mysterious Architects, who destroy inhabited planets. The series has been well-received critically, with Shards of Earth winning the 2021 BSFA Award for Best Novel. The entire series was a finalist for the 2024 Hugo Award for Best Series.

== Plot ==
=== Premise ===
The Architects are moon-sized creatures who destroy inhabited planets, including Earth. They will not attack planets with ruins from the mysterious Originator civilization. Only the Essiel, a species of aliens, know how to move Originator artifacts without destroying this protective effect. Many human colony planets vote to join the Essiel Hegemony in exchange for protection against the Architects.

Humans invent Intermediaries, a modified form of human that can fight Architects. Intermediary Idris Telemmier helps defeat an Architect at Berlenhof, turning the tide of the conflict decades after the destruction of Earth. Later, he and other Intermediaries make contact with an Architect, which seems to notice humanity for the first time. After this, all of the Architects mysteriously disappear.

Ships can travel through unspace, a dimension which allows faster-than-light travel. Most ships can travel only by following well-known Throughways, but Intermediaries can travel anywhere through unspace.

=== Shards of Earth ===
Decades later, conflict arises between the Parthenon (an all-female group of clones) and the Council of Human Interests, an interplanetary human government colloquially called Hugh. Myrmidon Executor Solace is ordered to find Idris and convince him to join the Parthenon. Idris is working as a salvager on the spaceship Vulture God. The crew also includes Olli, a disabled human engineer; Kris, a disgraced human lawyer; and Kittering, a Hannilambra accountant. Solace helps save Idris from being kidnapped by the powerful Uskaro family. She temporarily joins the crew.

Vulture God is hired by the Hegemony to search for a lost ship called the Oumaru. They find that it has been attacked by Architects. Both ships are then hijacked by the Broken Harvest crime syndicate, which is based out of the Hegemony. The crew follows Broken Harvest to the planet Tarekuma, where they reclaim their ship. In the process, they discover that the Oumaru was carrying Originator artifacts, which could protect an entire planet from Architects. They fly to the planet Jericho, where a Hiver (Note: The Hiver Assembly was a human-made artificial intelligence that gained independence with the help of the Parthenon. Hiver such as Trine can separate themselves from the Assembly's hive mind and may later rejoin it.) archaeologist named Trine verifies the artifacts' authenticity. Broken Harvest attempts to kidnap the crew again and eventually catches them near Berlenhof, capital of Hugh.

The Parthenon arrives to rescue Vulture God’s crew from Broken Harvest. As the Parthenon and Hugh fight over the fate of Idris and the Originator relics, an Architect appears at Berlenhof. The Parthenon and Idris take the artifacts to meet it. The Architect takes the artifacts. Idris manages to contact the Architect and learns that some unknown force is directing them to destroy inhabited planets. The Architect leaves the system. Idris and the crew agree to join the Parthenon, hoping to create a new group of Intermediaries before the Architects return.

=== Eyes of the Void ===
Investigator Havaer Mundy of Hugh is assigned to find a stolen data cylinder by Chief Laery; Hugh wants to prevent this from falling into the hands of the Parthenon. Meanwhile, Idris attempts to train Partheni women to become Intermediaries.

Trine invites Idris and the crew of the Vulture God to Arc Pallator. This is a Hegemony-controlled planet with Originator ruins. Previously Architects would avoid such planets, but it appears this is no longer true. The Architect there is not attacking the planet yet; first, it is dismantling the Originator ruins. In the meantime, the situation is ripe for scientific study. Architects finish the demolition of the Originator site and begin to destroy Arc Pallator. In the chaos, Idris is separated from Solace and his crew. He is first kidnapped by Uskaro soldiers before being kidnapped again by a Tothiat (Note: A Tothiat is a symbiotic combination of a Tothir and another sentient species, usually a human. Tothir are crustacean-like creatures who are very weak on their own, but grant exceptional strength and healing to their hosts.) named Emmaneth.

Mundy cracks the data cylinder, which contains a conversation between high-ranking Hugh officials. If the Architects returned, they planned to spark a war with the Parthenon in order to maximize the chance that Hugh could survive as a non-planet-based civilization. The Uskaro family would be extremely powerful in this new civilization.

Solace and the Vulture God crew escape Arc Pallator as the Architects destroy it, accompanied by Mundy. Parthenon and Hugh ships begin fighting, each accusing the other of stealing Idris. The Vulture God receives a message that Idris is alive. Olli and Kris meet with Aklu, the Essiel leader of Broken Harvest. Aklu offers to ally with the Vulture God and Mundy to retrieve Idris.

Idris is being held on Criccieth’s Hell by Emmaneth and her compatriots, a team of scientists. On this inhospitable world, there is a functional Originator structure instead of merely ruins. This structure is known as the Eye. Idris is able to use the Eye to search unspace, where he discovers the Architects’ breeding grounds. This provides a potential target for a future attack.

Kris is taken captive by Piter Uskaro, but the others are able to follow a lead to Criccieth’s Hell. Kris is rescued by Olli and Mundy. Solace descends to the Eye to rescue Idris, pursued by Uskaro soldiers. Idris and the others escape; Emmaneth dies while saving him. The survivors are picked up by the Parthenon. Chief Laery announces a partnership between her faction of Hugh, the Hiver Assembly, and Broken Harvest. This group is known as the Cartel. Idris will help train new Intermediaries and bring the war to the Architects.

=== Lords of Uncreation ===
Idris continues research at the Eye under the direction of the Cartel. Ravin Uskaro works against the Cartel with Executor Mercy, leader of a rogue faction of the Parthenon. This faction seizes control of the Eye and kills Laery. Olli and Kit take the Vulture God on a recon mission. They arrive back at the Eye just as the coup is taking place. They rescue Aklu and petition the Hegemony for assistance, which is granted.

The Hegemony launches an attack which acts as bait for Architects. Meanwhile, Kris and Trine lead a counter-attack against Uskaro forces. Solace and Mundy enact their own escapes from the coup leaders, allowing everyone to return to the Eye. Idris and his friends escape through unspace. Aklu remains behind. Every living being remaining in the system, including Aklu, Mercy, and most of the Uskaro family, is destroyed.

Idris arrives at Crux, a Hiver world. The Architects’ masters send Architects to kill Idris and his company. Idris realizes that the Architects are controlled by Originators, explaining their refusal to destroy Originator ruins. The presence of sentient minds deforms the fabric of unspace; when enough minds gather together on a planet, the Originators send Architects to destroy them.

Idris pilots the Eye into unspace; Olli and Kit remain in real space to serve as their anchor. They are pursued by Architects. In unspace, the Eye attacks the Architect nursery over Idris’s objections about a potential genocide. Idris and Solace journey to the center of unspace and confront the Originators, the titular lords of uncreation.

The Originators are attempting to manipulate the universe into a shape which will allow them to exist outside unspace, but large numbers of sentient lifeforms interfere with this process. The Originators send enslaved Architects to destroy planets whenever the population reaches a critical mass. Angered by Idris, they send hundreds of Architects to destroy humanity. Idris turns the Presence, unspace's apex predator, against the Originators and destroys them.

The Vulture God, the Hegemony, and a swarm of Architects all arrive at Berlenhof. Olli and Kit are given control of Broken Harvest, replacing the deceased Aklu. Olli is able to use the Hegemony's resources to fend off the Architects until Idris defeats the Originators. The Architects, now free from their enslavement, disappear into unspace.

Mundy is promoted and continues to work for Hugh. Solace returns to the Parthenon as they settle their own planet for the first time. Kris starts a civil rights law firm. Idris’s body remains alive, but his consciousness never returned from the Originators’ domain. Unknown to all but the remaining Intermediaries, his consciousness remains in unspace, guiding them in their interstellar transports.

== Major themes ==
Paul Weimer wrote that Shards of Earth explores the concept of diaspora and refugees. After the destruction of Earth, the humans in the book become part of an "unwilling diaspora". Weimer writes that this concept has been explored in different ways by other science fiction works, including Anvil of Stars by Greg Bear, the Queendom of Sol series by Wil McCarthy, and both versions of Battlestar Galactica. Weimer writes that exploring these concepts encourages readers to think about the treatment of modern-day refugees who are fleeing from "war, disease, famine, [and] economic privation."

== Style ==
Shards of Earth is narrated from several different perspectives, most notably those of Idris and Solace.

According to reviewer Russell Letson, Shards of Earth contains three MacGuffins: the salvaged ship indicating the return of the Architects, a container of potent alien artifacts, and Idris himself. The novel is divided into five parts, one for each of the planetary systems visited. He also wrote that the series as a whole "belongs to what might be called a meta-genre". Letson compares the horror of unspace to motifs found in the works of H.P. Lovecraft and Algernon Blackwood, among others. He also compared the series to The Expanse by James S.A. Corey, noting that both works contained "space operatics, down-and-dirty noir and intrigue elements, band-of-comrades adventure, gothic spookiness, alien weirdness, special-effects-go-boom sequences, and mysteries that could well remain mysterious when all is finally wrapped up."

In a review for Strange Horizons, Stephen Case wrote that Tchaikovsky organized Shards of Earth into "layers" of worldbuilding. In the first layer, Tchaikovsky develops the individual characters, primarily the crew members of the Vulture God. Each character serves as a "window into the broader universe". In the second layer, Tchaikovsky explores conflict between human factions. For example, conflict between Hugh and the Parthenon is examined through the characters of Idris and Solace. In the third and final layer, the novel explores "the ineffable... and utterly ungraspable" scale of the Architects.

== Reception ==
Publishers Weekly gave Shards of Earth a starred review, calling it "dazzlingly suspenseful" and "space opera at its best". In a review for Grimdark Magazine, Carrie Chi Lough praised the novel's nuanced characterization of the Intermediaries and the Partheni, and called the novel "the paragon of epic space operas". In a review for Locus, Russell Letson praised Shards of Earth as an example of "recombinant sci-fi" because it combines several large ideas into a "busy, complicated, surprising [concoction]." Letson praised the story's grand scope as well as its use of common tropes in novel ways. A review in New Scientist praised the psychological exploration of "unspace", but felt that the story was sometimes "hard to follow" due to the number of alien species, planets, and characters. Shards of Earth also won the 2021 British Science Fiction Award for Best Novel.

Publishers Weekly wrote a positive review for Eyes of the Void, stating that the author's "intelligent worldbuilding captures the essence of classic space opera". The review also called the plot "humorous, sometimes convoluted, but always memorable". In an article for Grimdark Magazine, Carrie Chi Lough praised Tchaikovsky's ability to give authenticity to the "truly outlandish aliens", while noting that the second book "did read as more of a setup piece for the third book in the series". Russell Letson of Locus described the second novel as "layered", with a plot "punctuated by a series of broadening, deepening, and complicating reveals." Letson concludes that:

The Final Architecture sequence belongs to what might be called a meta-genre, a narrative space that absorbs and integrates motifs and tropes and conventions from near and not-so-near neighbors. The inevitable comparison is with The Expanse: a similar combination of space operatics, down-and-dirty noir and intrigue elements, band-of-comrades adventure, gothic spookiness, alien weirdness, special-effects-go-boom sequences, and mysteries that could well remain mysterious when all is finally wrapped up."

Writing for Locus, Letson stated that "the occasionally comic episodic-adventure feeling of the first two volumes has shifted to something darker and more desperate" for the final book of the trilogy. Letson praised the wide scope of the novel, stating that the "combination of space operatics, horrors nameless and all-too-physical, alien cultural encounters, eye-crossing intrigues, serviceable villains, desperate heroics, durable loyalties, and strange but satisfying transformations makes for a complex, exhilarating ride." Publishers Weekly reviewed Lords of Uncreation and stated that the "abundance of characters muddies the cataclysmic plot, distracting from the slow reveal of the Architects’ motivations and next target". The review praised the final confrontation, noting that "Tchaikovsky sticks the landing, even if he wobbles a bit on the way there."

| Year | Work | Award | Category | Result | Ref. |
|---|---|---|---|---|---|
| 2021 | Shards of Earth | BSFA Award | Novel | Won | |
| 2021 | Shards of Earth | Dragon Award | Science Fiction Novel | Nominated | |
| 2022 | Shards of Earth | Locus Award | Science Fiction Novel | Finalist | |
| 2023 | Eyes of the Void | Locus Award | Science Fiction Novel | Finalist | |
| 2024 | The Final Architecture | Hugo Award | Series | Finalist | |
| 2024 | Lords of Uncreation | Locus Award | Science Fiction Novel | Finalist | |
