= Alien Clay =

2024 science fiction novel by Adrian Tchaikovsky

- Author: Adrian Tchaikovsky
- Language: English
- Genre: Science Fiction
- Set in: Kiln, a fictional exoplanet
- Published: 26 March 2024
- Publisher: Tor Books (US); Orbit Books (UK)
- Publication place: United Kingdom
- Pages: 416 (paperback)
- ISBN: 9780316578974

Alien Clay is a 2024 science fiction novel by Adrian Tchaikovsky. It tells the story of Arton Daghdev, a biologist who rebels against a fascist government on Earth and is exiled to a labor camp on an alien planet. The novel received a Special Citation from the Philip K. Dick Award and was a finalist for the 2025 Hugo Award for Best Novel and 2025 Locus Award for Best Science Fiction Novel.

== Plot ==
Professor Arton Daghdev's biology research is considered heterodox by the Mandate, the fascist government of Earth. Daghdev's theories contradict the Mandate's assertion that humanity is the pinnacle of evolution, and he additionally consorts with more direct revolutionary thinkers. He is convicted and sent to a labor camp on the exoplanet Kiln. There, he learns that the government has found remnants of an intelligent alien civilization. Commandant Terolan asks Daghdev to study the ruins and identify the builders. Daghdev is placed under the supervision of Mandate scientist Doctor Primatt.

Life on Kiln is exceedingly complex and interconnected; alien microorganisms have the capacity to infect humans. All Kilnish life is able to hybridize and form “macro-species” which are composed of many different organisms. This level of symbiosis and parasitism contradicts the Mandate's human-centric theory of evolution. Primatt is forced to censor her reports to the commandant to conform to scientific orthodoxy.

Daghdev begins a sexual relationship with Primatt while simultaneously planning an uprising with fellow prisoners. On the night of the planned revolt, a worker betrays the conspirators, and the revolution is stomped out. As punishment, Daghdev and Primatt are demoted to Excursions, while the ringleaders are executed. Excursions is the most dangerous job, composed of teams of laborers who are forced to leave the Mandate compound to inspect newly identified ruins.

On an excursion, an elephantine Kilnish animal destroys the team's flier. The Excursionistas are forced to brave the distance back to camp by foot. On the march back to camp, they are infected with Kilnish microbiota. They find that, just as the organisms of Kiln can all reach symbiosis with each other, the Excursionistas can now connect with each other on a nonverbal and subconscious level.

When they return to camp, they use their newfound connection to stage a more successful revolt against the Mandate. The narrative reveals that the “builders” for which the Mandate is searching are not a single species. Instead, they are an emergent property of the entire Kilnish ecosystem, which can become sentient under the right conditions. The newly awakened sentience, powered partly by the computing power of the Excursionistas’ brains, uses the native life of Kiln to destroy the Mandate's compound. Daghdev and the other survivors plan to return to Earth and colonize it with Kilnish life.

== Reception ==
In a starred review, Kirkus Reviews compared the novel to The Children Star by Joan Slonczewski in its depiction of biological puzzles. Kirkus stated that "the biological aspect of the story is a tool to support Tchaikovsky’s primary message, which is a vivid illustration of how suspicion can undermine both an authoritarian regime and any potential resistance to that regime." Kirkus concluded by calling the book "a savagely satirical take on the consequences of repressive doctrine and the power of collective action." Nadia Mercik of the British Fantasy Society called the novel a "tale of confrontation – with the authorities, with the world around you, with yourself." Mercik praised the worldbuilding of the exoplanet, writing that it felt truly alien, along with the "tight and well-constructed" plot.

Writing for Locus, Niall Harrison compared the novel to Morphotrophic by Greg Egan, writing that the two works are an example of "literary carcinization in their exploration of worlds "in which macroscopic organisms routinely exchange biomass." Harrison commented on the themes explored in the novel, stating that the difference between the Mandate and Kiln is "not about the individual versus the collective" but instead is "a debate about different types of collective organisation." The review concludes that Morphotrophic is less neat and more wandering, with a "thought-experiment feel". In contrast, the confidence of Alien Clay "makes it feel like a vehicle for argument, not a venue for inquiry."

In a separate review for Locus, Russell Letson stated that Alien Clay "combines [science fiction] with prison-camp and resistance-to-tyranny narratives." Letson also compared the novel to Morphotrophic, while drawing further comparisons between the Mandate and the totalitarian government of Nineteen Eighty-Four by George Orwell. Letson concludes that Alien Clay's "ingenuity lies in the way Tchaikovsky intertwines the prison-camp story line with Daghdev’s commentary on totalitarian regimes." In another review for Locus, Paul Di Filippo praised Tchaikovsky's ability to publish three great novels in 2024, writing that "similar runs of brilliance in the field" are few and far between. Di Filippo praised Daghdev's unique first-person narration, writing that it immediately hooks the reader.

Year	Award	Result	Ref.
2024	BSFA Award for Best Novel	Finalist_{§} (Note: Alien Clay was originally nominated for the 2024 BSFA Award for Best Novel, but was removed from the ballot at the request of the author.)	
2025	Hugo Award for Best Novel	Finalist	
2025	Locus Award for Best Science Fiction Novel	Finalist	
2025	Philip K. Dick Award	Special Citation	
