= Spiderlight =

2013 fantasy novel by Adrian Tchaikovsky

- Cover art for the 2016 Tor Books edition, the novel's first traditionally-published edition
- Author: Adrian Tchaikovsky
- Audio read by: Adrian Tchaikovsky
- Language: English
- Genre: Fantasy
- Published: 2013 (serialized); 2 August 2016 (Tor Books)
- Publisher: Aethernet; Tor Books
- Publication place: United Kingdom
- ISBN: 9780765388353

Spiderlight is a 2013 fantasy novel by Adrian Tchaikovsky. The novel tells the story of a group of humans and a giant spider who follow a prophecy to defeat the Dark Lord. The novel received critical praise for its exploration of the meaning of good and evil through the use of common fantasy tropes.

== Plot ==
Dion, a priestess of Armes, has assembled a group of four other humans. They include the thief Lief, the warrior Harathes, the archer Cyrene, and the wizard Penthos. They all seek to defeat the Dark Lord Darvezian. Dion and her entourage seek a fang and a knowledge of the "spider's path" which will allow them to kill the Dark Lord. They enter a forest inhabited by giant spiders, where they begin to attack the arachnids. The spider matriarch agrees to give them a fang if they will leave her forest. She sends her child Nth to serve as the humans' guide.

Penthos transforms Nth into a humanoid figure. (Note: In chapters written from the spider's point of view, he continues to call himself Nth. The human characters call him Enth. Furthermore, several group members initially have difficulty accepting Nth as a person; they use the pronoun "it" instead of "he". This plot summary will use the name Nth and masculine pronouns for consistency.) Penthos applies rules to Nth's behavior: he must not fight except in self-defense, he must not harm a member of the group, and he must obey their commands.

The group quickly becomes involved in personal conflicts. Cyrene and Harathes have slept together. Harathes behaves in a possessive and sexist manner, hoping to win her back; Cyrene has no desire for a relationship. Penthos pines after Dion, who has taken vows of chastity.

Dion brings them to Armesion, the city of the Church of Armes. She is experiencing doubts, since she serves the Light but is using a creature of Darkness on her quest. She is summoned before the Potentate, leader of the Church. Dion hopes for reassurance, but she realizes that the Potentate also has doubts.

Meanwhile, a group of priests kidnaps Nth. Abnasio, head of this sect, plans to sacrifice Nth and extract the secret to defeating Darvezian. Dion confronts Abnasio. A fight breaks out; Lief is stabbed. Dion performs a ritual which saves Lief at the cost of many years of her own lifespan. Dion and Penthos kill Abnasio and several of his followers.

Cyrene escapes with Nth. She is drugged by an innkeeper, who is secretly a servant of the Dark. Nth has the opportunity to kill Cyrene and join the Dark; instead, he kills a Dark servant and saves her.

The group reunites and continues their quest. Cyrene once again rejects Harathes. She drunkenly has sex with Nth. The next morning, an enraged Harathes barges into Cyrene's room and attacks Nth. Dion breaks up the fight and calls a group council to discuss their future. They agree to continue the quest. Nth brings them to the Spider's Path, a cave system. Penthos temporarily transforms Nth into a spider again, allowing him to negotiate for safe passage. The spiders refuse to grant passage, but Nth leads the group into the cave anyway.

Nth becomes humanoid again. He is torn between loyalty to Dion and his own species, but eventually warns the humans of a trap. Penthos kills many of the spiders. They exit the lair to find themselves at the foot of Darvezian's tower. They enter the tower, killing several servants of the Dark. They take two servants prisoner, but Nth kills them anyway. Nth states that Dion was only going to spare them because they were Men. He asks why the humans would be permitted to live when the spiders were killed; Dion cannot answer.

They enter Darvezian's throne room and confront the Dark Lord. Darvezian reveals that he himself created the prophecy about the spider fang. Darvezian is immortal; he has taken the place of both Heroes and Dark Lords throughout human history. His originally identity was Armes, the saint who founded Dion's Church. Armes created both the Light and the Dark to provide humanity with a moral compass, but he became disillusioned with humanity's failures. He began his current cycle as a way to amuse himself, feeling that humanity is an abject failure.

Penthos injures Darvezian, but he is killed in a magical duel. Nth attacks Darvezian. Darvezian tries to use spells including terms for "spider" and "man" against Nth. None of the spells work, as Nth has become something completely new. Nth kills Darvezian. Dion decides to return to Armesion, where she will be hailed as a hero for killing the Dark Lord. She will eventually become the Potentate, where she will reform the Church so that Light and Dark are no longer synonymous with good and evil. She invites Nth to join her; he accepts.

== Major themes ==
Liz Bourke wrote that Spiderlight draws an explicit contrast against the work of J. R. R. Tolkien. Bourke wrote that Middle-Earth reflects Tolkien's "moral essentialism" in which "a being is good or bad based on innate characteristics... Bad things — because Dark people are not really people, as such, except the ones who were Light originally — are to be destroyed."

According to Bourke, Tchaikovsky immediately challenges this worldview when the first chapter is narrated by Nth, a creature of Darkness. The reader is meant to be sympathetic toward both Nth and Dion; as the humans gradually recognize Nth's personhood, they begin to see the hypocrisy of their own worldview.

Mark Sawyer of Strange Horizons wrote that Tchaikovsky's novel is "an interrogation of the nature of 'Dark' and 'Light.'" The characters of Lief and Nth occupy a gray area in the novel's moral dichotomy. Lief is a servant of the Light, but he also works as a thief. Nth is a creature of Darkness, but his transformation into a humanoid figure leaves readers in "the 'uncanny valley' in which he is both somehow less and even more monstrous." The conclusion of the novel critiques the way in which many fantasy stories utilize "moral dualism." The review concludes that "What the novel leaves us with is a sense that maybe we should think for ourselves, which is perhaps the most important moral lesson we must be asked to study in these times."

== Style ==
Mark Yon of SFF World wrote that the beginning of the novel "reads as if it is straight out of the Dungeons & Dragons rulebook." The troop of human characters contains various archetypes, including a priest, mage, warrior, archer, and a thief. The plot also focuses on common tropes including a Dark Lord and a prophecy.

Andy Sawyer of Strange Horizons notes that Tchaikovsky explicitly invokes the works of Tolkien. A minor character named Lothern can be compared to Aragorn, while the Doomslayers fulfill the function of the Nazgûl. Finally, Nth and the other spiders evoke Shelob.

== Publication History ==
Spiderlight was first published in 2013 as a serial in Aethernet. It was later published in 2016 by Tor Books.

== Reception and awards ==
Publishers Weekly gave the novel a starred review, writing that it initially begins as a "humorous send-up of fantasy quests" before becoming a more philosophical work. The review notes that genre fans will recognize several metatextual references, including the use of Asimov's Three Laws of Robotics in the spells used to bind Enth. The review praised the thought-provoking exploration of good and evil, calling the novel's conclusion challenging for both the reader and characters alike. Mark Galloway of Library Journal gave a starred review to the 2024 audiobook version, which is narrated by Tchaikovsky himself. Galloway praised the narration, writing that the author has "a talent for a wide range of accents and emotions." Galloway concluded that the novel is a "nuanced fantasy exploration that is both thought-provoking and loads of fun."

Liz Bourke of Reactor called the novel "excellent", praising its combination of humor and seriousness. Bourke also commended the way in which the novel explores consent and sexual assault, as well as the novel's exploration of ethical issues. Bourke noted that "I’m not entirely convinced that the conclusion hangs together" but concluded that the rest of the novel's strengths outweighed any issues with the ending.

Mark Yon wrote that the novel exemplifies Tchaikovsky's "humour, great characterisation, [and] pleasing world building", despite being an earlier work in his oeuvre. Yon praised the character of Nth, the thematic content, and the directness of the travel elements of the story. Yon concluded that the novel proves "Adrian is just as at home writing Fantasy as he is his now-better known SF."
