= Bear Head =

2021 novel by Adrian Tchaikovsky

- Author: Adrian Tchaikovsky
- Language: English
- Series: Bioforms
- Genre: Science fiction, dystopian, cyberpunk, political thriller
- Publisher: Bloomsbury Publishing
- Publication date: 2021
- Media type: Print
- Preceded by: Dogs of War
- Followed by: Bee Speaker

Bear Head is a dystopian sci-fi, cyberpunk political thriller by Adrian Tchaikovsky, published in 2021 by Bloomsbury Publishing. Although the novel stands alone, it is the second in the author's Bioforms series, and follows on from Dogs of War. A third novel in the series, Bee Speaker, was published in 2025.

== Plot ==
The novel is set on Mars, in a world in which warfare has evolved to include bio-engineered, non-human soldiers. The story sees the return of Honey, the highly intelligent human/bear Bioform first introduced in Dogs of War.

Set a few decades after the events of Dogs of War, Bear Head begins with Jimmy Marten, a human engineer who has been Bioformed to deal with the hardships of working on Mars. Life in Hell City is bleak, with human workers and Bioforms co-operating to create a luxury environment for a wealthy elite, without ever enjoying its benefits. Jimmy's life is hard, and he seeks release through Stringer, a local — and very expensive — designer drug. Desperate for money, he agrees to use his headspace to carry contraband data. But Jimmy soon finds that the data he is carrying is both articulate and self-aware, and claims to be Honey, the political activist and well-known academic Bioform bear.

Narrated first by Jimmy, and then told through the voices of Honey the bear, and that of a political secretary, we discover that on Earth, a political pressure group directed by Warner S. Thompson, a populist and World Senate hopeful, has been working to control — and potentially eliminate — Bioforms through a programme of collaring. We also learn that Honey, via Jimmy, aims to communicate with another consciousness on Mars. It ultimately reveals itself as another Bioform character from Dogs of War; the group entity Bees. Following a botched attempt to destroy them with a virus, Bees has had to go into hiding, and both she and her old friend, the distributed human intelligence HumOS, are now regarded as terrorists. Honey's attempt to reconnect, as well as to make sense of her own memories, is linked to the unfolding situation on Earth, where Warner S. Thompson has a secret plan to extend his collaring scheme to humans, as well as to Bioforms.

== Background ==
Although the book is set in a futuristic universe, it remains strongly rooted in contemporary politics. Critics have commented on the similarities between the character of Warner S. Thompson and that of US President Donald Trump.

Tchaikovsky says in an interview with El Periodico: "The great curse for a science writer is that the world becomes like his book. And it is terrifying what is happening. They are developing AI-controlled drones, armed robots... not to save human lives in war zones, but to protect the people who give the orders."

Tchaikovsky has revealed in interview that the main idea for Bear Head (including much of the plot) came to him in a dream under the working title, Bear With Me.

== Reception ==
The Times selected Bear Head among its best new sci-fi reads of January 2021. Grimdark Magazine describes it as: '...a brilliantly observed, drily funny and deeply grim science fiction story of biotech, artificial intelligence and political greed.'
