= The Hungry Gods =

2025 novella by Adrian Tchaikovsky

- Author: Adrian Tchaikovsky
- Language: English
- Series: Terrible Worlds: Innovations
- Genre: Science fiction
- Published: 12 August 2025
- Publisher: Solaris Books
- Publication place: United Kingdom
- Pages: 176 (hardcover)
- ISBN: 9781837865512

The Hungry Gods is a 2025 science fiction novella by Adrian Tchaikovsky. It is the first entry in his Terrible Worlds: Innovations series.

== Plot ==
Several tribes populate an Earth devastated by pollution, including the Rabbits, Seagulls, and Cockroaches. Amri, a member of the Rabbit tribe, is sent to a ruined city to scavenge for fuel. The city is controlled by Seagulls, a rival tribe. Amri is captured by Beaker, a leader of the Seagulls. Beaker plans to execute her, but his plan is interrupted when four large objects fall from the sky. Amri uses the distraction to escape.

Amri returns to her village just as it is destroyed by the rapid growth of unnatural vegetation. She is approached by a man who introduces himself as Guy Vesten and claims to be a god. Guy states that he and the other three gods left a dying Earth to save the “best” parts of humanity. They have now returned in order to save the Earth.

The other three “gods” are Bruce Mayall, Matthias Fabrey, and Padraig Gramm. Each has their own competing vision of how to terraform Earth. The vegetation that destroyed Amri's village is Bruce's work. Bruce believes that genetically modified plants and fungi can be used to restore the world.

Guy claims that he was cast out by the other gods after attempting to stop their work. Amri enters a sexual relationship with Guy, believing that this will ensure his protection. Guy gathers several members of the Rabbit and Seagull clans, who agree to oppose the other gods. Beaker agrees to join Guy, despite his earlier conflict with Amri. Guy leads the Seagull and Rabbit survivors to confront Bruce. Guy distracts Bruce while Amri kills him.

The survivors are attacked by ants controlled by Matthias, who wants to use insects to control a restored Earth. Amri and Beaker are rescued by Padraig. Padraig intends to recreate the old world through the use of plastics and robotics. He offers a truce with Guy and Matthias, who decline. Guy rescues Amri and Beaker. He uses pheromones to change the behavior of the ants, which then eat Matthias alive.

Guy and Padraig negotiate. Padraig reveals Guy's plan for the restored Earth: he would have put the planet into stasis, awaiting the arrival of extraterrestrial intelligent life to revive them. Guy blackmails Padraig. Guy has obtained a plastic-eating microbe from Matthias's research and threatens to deploy it unless Padraig surrenders. Padraig agrees.

Fifteen years later, Amri, Beaker, and the other survivors have built temples to the four new gods. Amri serves as the high priestess of a new religious movement, using the technology of the gods to rebuild the world. Amri seduces Guy, convincing him to remove his protective armor and allowing Beaker to capture him. Guy remains locked within his own temple, ensuring that he will never control the new world that Amri and her companions are building.

== Major themes ==
Paul Di Filippo wrote that the novel is a satire of the idea of the tech bro. Di Filippo's review compared Guy Vestin and the other "Gods" to famous fictional characters that share characteristics with the modern tech bro. These characters include Captain Nemo, Howard Roark, D. D. Harriman, and Lex Luthor. Guy's ideology culminates in a large speech in Chapter 16 of The Hungry Gods, in which he proclaims his own genius and decries the governments and shareholders that previously held him back. Di Fillipo concludes that "You can’t get more tech-bro-ish than that!"

Zorica Lola Jelic of SFRA Review wrote that the novella evokes The Word for World is Forest by Ursula K. Le Guin. In both works, "humans with advanced technology play Gods in a world where people have no technology." The Hungry Gods explores themes developed in many of Tchaikovsky's other works, including "ecology, advanced technology, and humans playing Gods." Jelic feels that Tchaikovsky has a negative view of humanity, stating that greed and power always seem to win out over compassion. She restates Tchaikovsky's philosophy as: "[H]umanity is trapped in a vicious cycle of war, sacrifice, and conquests. This cycle is broken occasionally only to start from the beginning."

== Reception and awards ==
Writing for Locus, Paul Di Filippo stated that The Hungry Gods is "Tchaikovsky lite," due to its short length. Di Filippo stated that "it embodies less-revolutionary ideas and scenarios than most of his books..." Despite this, the reviewer found the book to be "a highly accomplished, rousing, satisfying, often humorous read."
