= Aldiss Award =

Award for speculative fiction worldbuilding

- Awarded for: A work of speculative fiction with excellence in worldbuilding
- Venue: World Fantasy Convention
- Country: United Kingdom
- Presented by: British Science Fiction Association; British Fantasy Society; UK Interactive Entertainment Association
- First award: 2025; 1 year ago
- Website: thealdissaward.com

The Aldiss Award is an annual award given for worldbuilding in the speculative fiction genre. It is named for British science fiction author Brian Aldiss.

== History ==
The award was launched in 2025, which would have been the year in which Aldiss celebrated his one hundredth birthday. The inaugural award was announced at the World Fantasy Convention.

The Aldiss Award judging panel is composed of select members of the British Science Fiction Association (BSFA), the British Fantasy Society, and the UK Interactive Entertainment Association. The judges for 2025 and 2026 were author David Green; Janet Forbes, founder of World Anvil; and Allen Stroud, outgoing chair of the BSFA.

The winner of the award receives a commemorative bookend.

== Winners and shortlist ==
* Winners and joint winners

Year	Author	Work	Ref.
2025	Rogba Payne*	The Dance of Shadows	
2025	Aman J. Bedi	Kavithri	
2025	Gabriella Buba	Saints of Storm and Sorrow	
2025	Veronica Roth	When Among Crows	
2025	Caitlin Rozakis	Dreadful	
2025	Wole Talabi	Shigidi and the Brass Head of Obalufon	
2026	Tasha Suri*	The Isle in the Silver Sea	
2026	Morgan Ryan	A Resistance of Witches	
2026	Oliver K. Langmead	City Of All Seasons	
2026	Aliya Whiteley	City Of All Seasons	
2026	Adrian Tchaikovsky	Shroud	
2026	Caitlin Rozakis	The Grimoire Grammar School Parent Teacher Association	
