= Ian Sales =

British science fiction author

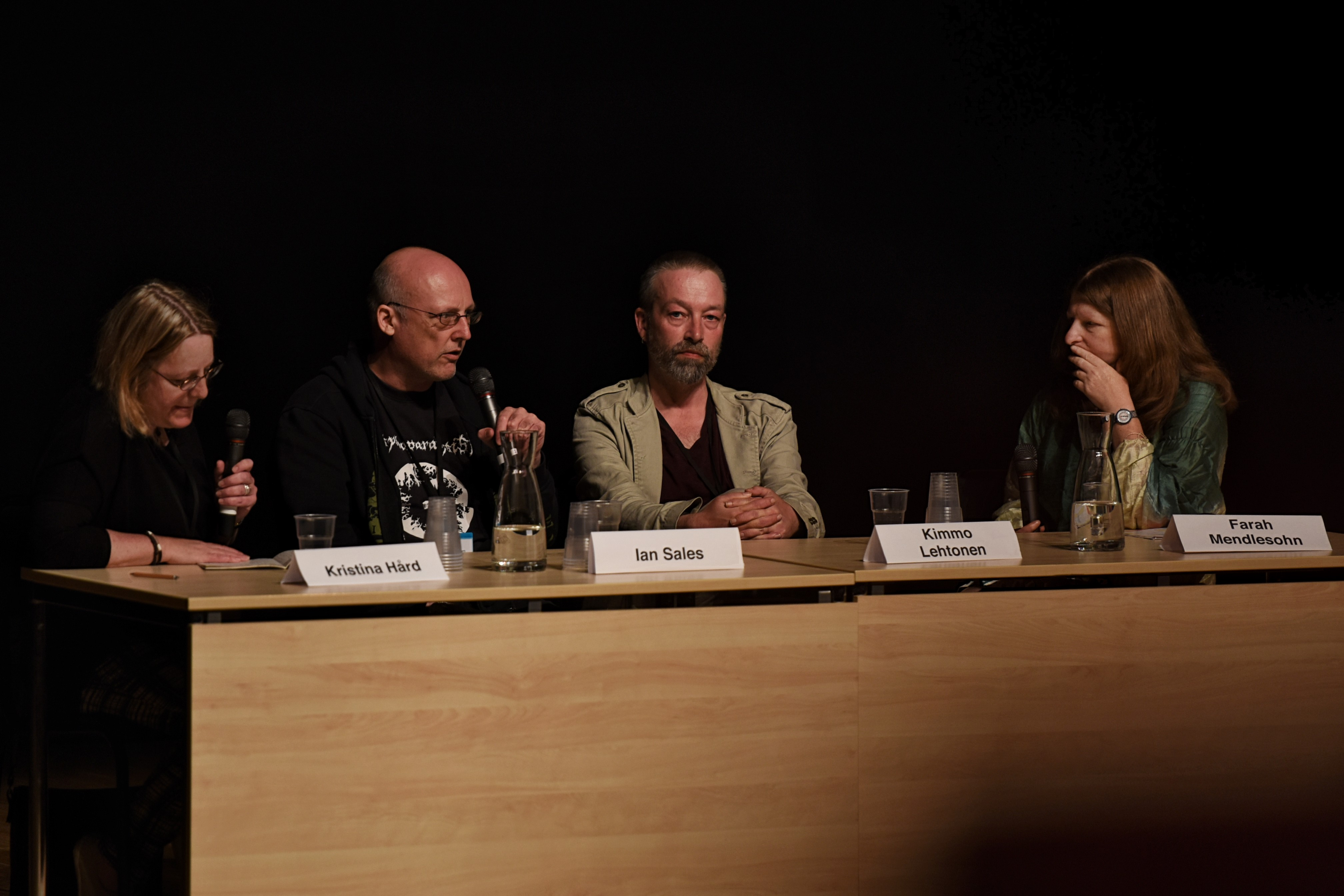
Ian Sales talking during a panel discussion at Archipelacon, Mariehamn, in 2015.

Ian Sales is a British science fiction writer, editor and founder of the SF Mistressworks website. Although born in the UK, he grew up in the Middle-East, in Qatar, Oman, Dubai and Abu Dhabi.

== Biography ==
In the 1990s he was joint editor of The Lyre science-fiction magazine, which published work by authors such as Eric Brown, Stephen Baxter, Gwyneth Jones and Peter F Hamilton.

In 2012, he edited the anthology Rocket Science for Mutation Press. One of the non-fiction articles in the anthology, 'The Complexity of the Humble Spacesuit' by Karen Burnham was nominated for the BSFA Award in the non-fiction category.

His self-published novella Adrift on the Sea of Rains, the first book of the Apollo Quartet, was described by the Guardian national newspaper as "one of the most outstanding self-published books of the year". It won the 2012 BSFA Award in the short fiction category, and was a finalist for the 2012 Sidewise Award for Alternate History Best Short-Form. The second book of the quartet, The Eye With Which The Universe Beholds Itself, was published in early 2013, and the third book, Then Will The Great Ocean Wash Deep Above, in late 2013. The final book of the quartet, a novel titled All That Outer Space Allows, was published in April 2015, and was selected for the James Tiptree, Jr Award honor list in April 2016. Also published in April 2015 was the first book of a space opera trilogy, A Prospect of War. It was followed by A Conflict of Orders in October 2015, and A Want of Reason is due in 2016.

== Bibliography ==
- Rocket Science. Glasgow: Mutation Press, 2012. ISBN 978-1-907553-03-5
- Aphrodite Terra: Stories About Venus, Sheffield: Whippleshield Books, 2015. ISBN 978-0-9931417-5-1
- Dreams of the Space Age, Sheffield: Whippleshield Books, 2015. ISBN 978-0-9931417-7-5
- Apollo Quartet
  - Adrift on the Sea of Rains. Sheffield: Whippleshield Books, 2012. ISBN 978-0-9571883-0-3
  - The Eye With Which The Universe Beholds Itself. Sheffield: Whippleshield Books, 2013. ISBN 978-0-9571883-3-4
  - Then Will The Great Ocean Wash Deep Above. Sheffield: Whippleshield Books, 2013. ISBN 978-0-9571883-7-2
  - All That Outer Space Allows. Sheffield: Whippleshield Books, 2015. ISBN 978-0-9931417-3-7
- An Age of Discord
  - A Prospect of War. North Blyth: Tickety Boo Press, 2015. ISBN 978-0-9929077-9-2
  - A Conflict of Orders. North Blyth: Tickety Boo Press, 2015.
