= Made Things =

2019 novella by Adrian Tchaikovsky

- Author: Adrian Tchaikovsky
- Illustrator: Christine Foltzer; Red Nose Studio
- Language: English
- Genre: Fantasy
- Publisher: Tor Books
- Publication date: 5 November 2019
- Publication place: United Kingdom
- Pages: 189
- ISBN: 9781250232991
- Preceded by: "Precious Little Things" (short story)

Made Things is a 2019 novella by Adrian Tchaikovsky. It tells the story of Coppelia, a puppeteer and thief, and her companions, a group of homunculi.

== Plot ==
Coppelia is a street thief and puppeteer in the city of Loretz, which is ruled by a Convocation of mages. Coppelia’s companions are homunculi named Tef and Arc. Homunculi were created by a magician living in an isolated tower, but they have recently begun to spread to cities throughout the world. Tef and Arc work with Coppelia to steal magical trinkets; they use the stolen magic to create more homunculi. The decision to work with Coppelia is controversial among the other homunculi of Loretz, as secrecy is a tenet of their society.

Coppelia and her mentor, Auntie Countless, are summoned before the crime lord Ferrulio. Ferrulio orders the women to investigate a golem. Auntie Countless, Coppelia join a team of four other thieves: Doublet, Rosso, Doctor Losef, and Shabby Lilith. They break into an underground workshop where the golem was last spotted. They accidentally awaken the golem; Auntie Countless, Rosso, and Doublet are killed. Shabby Lilith, Doctor Losef, and the homunculi escape. Coppelia is left behind.

As revenge for the attempted theft, the Convocation kills Ferrulio and many of his subordinates in a magical attack. The homunculi reveal themselves to Shabby Lilith and Doctor Losef. They also recruit Kernel Jointmaker, Ferrulio’s lieutenant. They all agree to work together. The homunculi plan to rescue Coppelia, while the humans want revenge for Ferrulio’s death.

The golem reveals to Coppelia that it is Archmage Phenrir, the leader of Loretz. The aging Phenrir created a new immortal body for himself and transferred his spirit into the golem. He forces Coppelia to use her puppeteering skills to repair his artificial body.

The thieves attempt to break into the workshop, but are apprehended by a mage named Firmin. Coppelia and the thieves are all brought before the golem. Coppelia manipulates the golem into fighting Firmin. She also accuses the golem of faking its identity as Archmage Phenrir; she believes it is actually a large homunculus. During the ensuing fight, Tef dismantles the golem and Arc kills Firmin. The survivors escape from the workshop with stolen valuables in tow.

In an epilogue, Coppelia continues to help create new bodies for the homunculi of Loretz. The golem's head sits in her workshop.

== Reception and awards ==
Eric Brown of The Guardian praised the book's "impressive characterization and worldbuilding" despite a short page length. Brown called the work "a thrilling parable about the abuse of power and the ability of the disenfranchised to effect change."

Don Vicha of Booklist wrote that the author "reaffirms his mastery of gritty fantasy settings with this sublime novella..." Vicha further praised the characterization and setting, concluding that the works shows "Tchaikovsky at the top of his form."

Publishers Weekly called the novella "charming." The review praised the commentary on "what makes people human." The review concluded that the author "makes expert use of the novella form to tell a self-contained story, and the dashingly roguish cast, clever prose, ... and well-placed moments of heartfelt emotion are sure to delight."

Ernest Lilley Amazing Stories included the novella on its list of "Science Fiction Books to Look for November 2019." Lilley noted that the line between fantasy and science fiction literature is often blurry. The review stated that Made Things was included on the science fiction recommendation list, despite being "firmly on the fantasy side", because of its thematic exploration of the relationship between humans and automatons.
