= Walking to Aldebaran =

2019 science fiction novella by Adrian Tchaikovsky

- Author: Adrian Tchaikovsky
- Audio read by: Adrian Tchaikovsky
- Language: English
- Series: Terrible Worlds: Destinations
- Release number: 1
- Genre: Science fiction
- Publisher: Solaris Books
- Publication date: 18 May 2019
- Publication place: United Kingdom
- Followed by: One Day All This Will Be Yours

Walking to Aldebaran is a 2019 science fiction novella by Adrian Tchaikovsky. It is the first entry in his Terrible Worlds: Destinations series.

== Plot ==
Astronaut Gary Rendell is trapped in a labyrinth. He has been alone for an unknown period of time, possibly for months. As a result, he is experiencing paranoia and dissociation. He narrates his story to a figment of his imagination, whom he calls "Toto".

In a series of flashbacks, Rendell recounts how a space probe discovers a Trans-Neptunian Object of alien origin. This Artefact is a massive circular object full of holes of varying sizes. Further investigations reveal that these are tunnels which can connect to other solar systems.

Rendell is selected as one of the first human explorers to investigate the Artefact. After several years of spaceflight, Rendell and his crew reach the Artefact. While many of the tunnels are inimicable to human survival, the team identifies one area with the correct atmospheric pressure, gravity, and oxygenation for a crewed mission. Rendell and the other explorers are sent inside the Artefact.

The team of six astronauts journeys into a labyrinth, which Rendell calls "the Crypts". They are ambushed by a local predator. Four astronauts are killed outright, and Rendell is separated from the only other survivor. Rendell wanders through the Crypts for several days. Weak and hungry, he encounters a structure which he calls the mother machine. The machine swallows Rendell, tearing him apart and remaking him at a cellular level. As a result of these modifications, he will never starve or suffocate in the harsh environments of the Crypts.

As he continues to wander, Rendell encounters several other sentient species. Some, such as a group of metallic eggs, appear friendly. Others are aggressive; he kills a worm-like creature that attacks him. The Crypts contain many dangerous environments, including areas where gravity changes unexpectedly. The loneliness and constant threats begin to wear on Rendell's mind. Rendell begins hearing a "scritching" noise in his mind and becomes convinced that an alien creature is transmitting signals into his brain.

Rendell finds a humanoid creature which he dubs the "iron hunchback". It attempts to speak to him in Danish and hands him a food wrapper, indicating it has had contact with humans. Rendell attacks the creature and chases it off. Rendell encounters a group of smaller creatures, which he calls goblins. He suspects they may be causing the scritching. Toto tells him to kill them all. Rendell kills the goblins and begins to eat them. The goblins are revealed to be human explorers. Even after realizing their true identities, Rendell continues to hunt the surviving humans. The scritching sound is revealed to be a result of the mother machine's alterations, as Rendell has gained the ability to sense human thoughts.

Rendell finds the exit from the labyrinth, bringing him back to where his journey began. He attacks a group of humans, but they are defended by the iron hunchback. The creature severely injures Rendell by tearing off his arm. Rendell flees back into the Crypts. He cries out to the mother machine for help as he dies.

== Style ==
The novel is written in first person, narrated by Gary Rendell. Mark Yon wrote that the "rather manic" style reflects Gary's panicked state, particularly at the beginning of the story.

Rendell makes frequent literary allusions, including references to The Wonderful Wizard of Oz and T. S. Eliot. The novel's ending references the character of Grendel from Beowulf, with a particular clue being that Gary's name can be abbreviated to G. Rendell. Tadiana Jones compared the novella to the book Grendel, a 1971 novel by John Gardner which retells Beowulf from the antagonist's perspective.

== Reception ==
Elizabeth Tabler of Grimdark Magazine stated that the novella combines elements of psychological horror, cosmic horror, comedic horror, and science fiction. Initially, the "humor lulls the reader into a false sense of normalcy" before the more horrific elements are revealed. Additionally, the way in which the story is told out of chronological order "adds to the narrative's wobbliness. Gary is off his damn rocker, and so is the way the story is being told." Tabler recommended the novella for "readers looking for a little horror flavored science fiction" and concluded that Tchaikovsky shows his skill by packing "so much terror into a such a short story."

In a review for Science Fiction Book Review Podcast, Luke Burrage stated that Walking to Aldebaran features a "big dumb object in space." Burrage praised the author's ability to fit the plot, characters, and ideas into a shorter work, calling it "perfectly calibrated" in some aspects. Burrage stated that the novel was "fun enough while it lasts" but "not enough to sink your teeth into". Ultimately, he awarded it 3.5 stars out of a possible 5. Civilian Reader called the book "an interesting, amusing and rather peculiar short novel." The reviewer praised Rendell's unreliable narration, stating that Walking to Aldebaran shows off Tchaikovsky's versatility as an author.

Tadiana Jones of fantasyliterature.com gave the novella five stars out of a possible five. The review stated that the tone was reminiscent of The Martian by Andy Weir, though Tchaikovsky's tone is "darker and more erudite." Jones praised the novella as an example of science fiction with "unusual literary depth." Mark Yon of SFF World also compared the book to The Martian. Yon was ambivalent about this stylistic choice, noting that it portrayed Rendell as a "man of the people" but could be read as overbearing or condescending. Nevertheless, Yon stated that it was impressive "to convey a real sense of time, character and place in a hundred or so pages."
