= BSFA Award for Best Media =

- Awarded for: The best media science fiction or fantasy published in the previous calendar year
- Country: UK
- Presented by: British Science Fiction Association
- First award: 1979
- Currently held by: Discontinued
- Website: www.bsfa.co.uk/awards/

The BSFA Awards are given every year by the British Science Fiction Association. The BSFA Award for Best Media was given for the best media science fiction or fantasy published in the previous calendar year. It was discontinued in 1992.

== Winners ==
- 1978: The Hitchhiker's Guide to the Galaxy, first series (radio series)
- 1979: The Hitchhiker's Guide to the Galaxy (record)
- 1980: The Hitchhiker's Guide to the Galaxy, second series (radio series)
- 1981: Time Bandits (film)
- 1982: Blade Runner (film)
- 1983: Android (film)
- 1984: The Company of Wolves (film)
- 1985: Brazil (film)
- 1986: Aliens (film)
- 1987: Star Cops (television series)
- 1988: Who Framed Roger Rabbit (film)
- 1989: Red Dwarf (television series)
- 1990: Twin Peaks (television series)
- 1991: Terminator 2: Judgment Day (film)
