= Dogs of War (2017 novel) =

2017 novel by Adrian Tchaikovsky

Dogs of War is a dystopian sci-fi, cyberpunk novel by UK author Adrian Tchaikovsky, published in 2017 by Head of Zeus. It forms the first part of the Bioforms (also known as the Dogs of War) trilogy, and is followed by Bear Head (2021) and Bee Speaker (2025).

== Background ==
The title, Dogs of War, refers to a phrase spoken by Mark Antony in Act 3, Scene 1 of Shakespeare's play Julius Caesar, "Cry 'Havoc!', and let slip the dogs of war."

Tchaikovsky acknowledges that Dogs of War came directly from his reading of H.G. Wells’ novel, The Island of Dr Moreau. He also mentions the influence of Steinbeck's Of Mice and Men in relation to Rex, his main protagonist. Although Tchaikovsky says in interview that he had a childhood phobia of dogs, he goes on to say that his research into the science of domestication and the study of how dogs' brains work led him to "like dogs in the abstract."

== Plot ==
The novel is set in the near future, in a world in which warfare has evolved to include bio-engineered, non-human soldiers.

The main protagonist and first-person narrator, Rex, is a human/canine Bioform, heavily armed and genetically engineered to be a weapon of war. Along with his companions, Honey (a hyperintelligent bear), Dragon (a camouflaging sniper) and a swarm of sentient, electronic Bees, he exists to serve his master as part of a Multiform Assault Pack in war-torn Campeche, in southeastern Mexico. His responses controlled by biofeedback implants, all Rex wants is to be a Good Dog for his master. But when his master, a mercenary, is put on trial for the massacre of civilians, Rex and his companions find themselves directionless, and are forced to reassess their understanding of morality and their role within the world.

Further complications arise when it becomes clear that in the context of their master's war crimes, the Assault Pack are perceived by humans as weapons of war, rather than individuals with the capacity to learn. Faced with calls for their destruction, the team must not only survive, but persuade their human masters that they are sentient, autonomous beings who deserve to exist, rather than a dangerous experiment that needs to be erased.

The novel is followed by Bear Head, which continues Honey's story as she re-emerges as part of a data download in the mind of a human, and by Bee Speaker, published in 2025.

== Themes ==
The main themes in Dogs of War are those of free will, personal agency and what it means to be an individual. The novel also explores the concept of modern slavery, the moral implications of creating artificial intelligence, the ethics of warfare and the right to life. In an interview, Tchaikovsky says that one of the book's main themes is: "a sort of extreme iteration of societal control, the idea of ‘collaring’ someone so that they cannot say no."

== Reception ==
The book was well-received, and was nominated for the BSFA Best Novel Award. A starred review from Publishers Weekly praised the worldbuilding and Rex's character development. Grimdark Magazine praised the author's characterization and skill in creating relatable non-human protagonists, while criticizing the somewhat "heavy-handed" handling of the main themes. The Guardian praised it as "A timely warning about the dangers of artificial intelligence and super weapons in the hands of unscrupulous powers."
