= Saturation Point (novella) =

2024 novella by Adrian Tchaikovsky

- Author: Adrian Tchaikovsky
- Language: English
- Series: Terrible Worlds: Transformations
- Genre: Science fiction
- Published: 30 March 2024
- Publisher: Solaris Books
- Publication place: United Kingdom
- Pages: 176 (Hardcover)
- Awards: 2024 BSFA Award for Shorter Fiction
- ISBN: 9781837861743
- Followed by: Preaching to the Choir

Saturation Point is a 2024 novella by Adrian Tchaikovsky. It is the first entry in his Terrible Worlds: Transformations series. It won the 2024 BSFA Award for Shorter Fiction.

== Plot ==
The Hygrometric Dehabitation Region, or the “Zone,” is a growing band of rainforest near the equator, a result of climate change. The heat and humidity there make it impossible for humans to survive. Graduate student Jasmine Marks travels into the Zone with a group of researchers led by Dr. Elaine Fell. Their goal is to find a way to use the Zone for agriculture, alleviating the problem of world hunger. Corporate funding dries up, several expedition members die, and the project is eventually canceled.

Two decades later, Dr. Marks is a biologist in a dead-end job. Corporate magnate Maxwell Glasshower hires her for an expedition. Because expeditions to the Zone are extremely rare, Glasshower hopes that Marks's first-hand experience will be useful. The group arrives at the Zone, supplied with high-tech hazard suits that allow them to survive the fatal wet-bulb temperatures. Despite this, half of the expedition's members perish on the first night after a tent failure.

One of the group's soldiers shoots at a figure near the survivors’ tent, killing it. The dead stranger appears human, but has pale green skin. An autopsy reveals that someone has genetically modified humans to be able to survive in the Zone; these green people are ectotherms. Glasshower states that Dr. Fell was performing illegal human experimentation; finding out more information is the true purpose of this expedition.

More disasters befall Marks's crew. Attacks from the green men and native fauna decimate their numbers. Glasshower is shot by green men. Marks flees into the woods with Chella, Glasshower's personal assistant. Chella is wounded and their suit is punctured. Marks receives an electronic message from Dr. Fell promising safety. Dr. Fell states that she orchestrated the attacks on the expedition, but feels that Marks will be in agreement with her research goals.

Marks and Chella reach an underground research station, where the heat is oppressive but not lethal. Marks speaks to Dr. Fell via radio. Fell reveals that large corporations wanted to develop a resilient human subspecies in order to provide slave labor for agriculture in the Zone. Glasshower appears, along with several surviving soldiers. They chose Marks for the expedition in the hopes that Fell would try to recruit her, thus revealing Fell's location. Glasshower plans to assassinate Fell, steal her research, and destroy the green men. Glasshower fears that the green men are too adaptable, and that they will out-compete standard humans as the Zone continues to grow. A fight breaks out; Glasshower and Chella are both killed.

Marks enters Fell's office, where she meets a green woman who has been using a voice emulator to impersonate Dr. Fell. The real Fell has been dead for years. Marks learns that the green pigment is a result of colonization with a species of algae, which can be removed. Many green people have begun to move outside the Zone, replacing standard humans. Global warming allows them to survive outside the Zone, despite their status as ectotherms. Marks is taken prisoner, and a green woman is sent back outside the Zone to take her place. The story ends as the imposter Dr. Marks prepares a fictional report explaining the deaths of Glasshower and the other members of the expedition.

== Style ==
The story is narrated in first-person. It is an epistolary novel consisting of "a somewhat broken and fragmentary transcript" of audio recordings by Dr. Marks.

== Reception ==
Writing for Locus, Paul Di Filippo praised the character of Jasmine Marks, finding her believable and sympathetic. He wrote that the first half of the book featured a "cinematic rollercoaster" involving the journey into the Zone. Di Filippo compared this half of the novel to Deathworld by Harry Harrison, with its ever-present threat of mortality. Di Filippo wrote that the second half of the book was more philosophical, exploring the implications of another offshoot of humanity. The review compared the second half of the book to works including Rogue Moon and The Man in the Maze. Di Filippo concluded that the two halves "slot together like hand and glove" and that Tchaikovsky's "artistry takes on and endorses an almost cosmic point of view."

Sébastien Doubinsky of Ancillary Review of Books wrote that the book draws from numerous other works, including The Island of Doctor Moreau by H.G. Wells, Annihilation by Jeff VanderMeer, and Heart of Darkness by Joseph Conrad. It also draws from the film Apocalypse Now, itself based on the Conrad novel. Doubinsky criticized the book's colonial setting, writing that it leans into stereotypes of native people. Doubinsky stated that "Tchaikovsky’s intention is obviously critical" but that the use of classic archetypes "might make a few readers cringe." The review concluded that Saturation Point "is definitely a fun read, but also seems to lack reflection on what tropes and archetypes we should use in speculative fiction today."

The book won the 2024 BSFA Award for Shorter Fiction.

== Adaptations ==
In June 2025, Universal Pictures acquired the rights to adapt the film. Cynthia Erivo and Michael Bay were attached as producers. Minnie Schedeen was set to write the script, which will be her debut as a screenwriter.
