= Guns of the Dawn =

2015 novel by Adrian Tchaikovsky

- Author: Adrian Tchaikovsky
- Language: English
- Genre: Fantasy
- Published: 12 Feb 2015
- Publisher: Tor Books, Pan Macmillan
- Publication place: United Kingdom
- Pages: 658 (Hardcover)
- ISBN: 9781447272670

Guns of the Dawn is a 2015 novel by Adrian Tchaikovsky. It tells the story of Emily Marshwic, an upper-class woman who becomes a soldier. The novel has been described as a "flintlock fantasy" and draws inspiration from the works of Jane Austen. It was shortlisted for the 2016 British Fantasy Award for Best Fantasy Novel.

== Plot ==
The story starts with a flashforward. Soldier Emily Marshwic watches as her friend Elise is killed in battle.

Three years prior to the events of the novel, revolutionaries in Denland overthrow their king. Denland invades its neighboring kingdom, Lascanne. King Luthrian institutes a draft.

Emily Marshwic lives with her sisters Alice and Mary at Grammaine, their family manor. Their younger brother Rodric is conscripted when he turns fifteen. Emily attempts to intervene with the Mayor-Governor, Mr. Northway, but he refuses to grant Rodric a dispensation. The Marshwics have a contentious relationship with Northway; they blame his corrupt dealings for their father's suicide.

As the economy deteriorates, Mr. Northway begins sending food to Grammaine; the Marshwics dole it out to other needy families, refusing to accept Northway's charity. Alice is kidnapped by bandits. Northway assists in rescuing her, earning Emily's grudging respect. Emily and Alice attend a ball. She meets Giles Scavian, a warlock in service to King Luthrian. She dances with Northway and Luthrian. Emily laters offers Northway a truce.

In the following months, the King institutes a draft for women. Emily volunteers as the Marshwic family's representative. Northway offers her an exemption. She initially plans to accept, but learns that Rodric has been killed and changes her mind.

Emily begins her training as a soldier. She meets Elise, a former criminal. Emily is made an ensign, and the women are sent to war despite being unprepared for combat. Emily volunteers for the Levant front, which is filled with difficult, swampy terrain. During their first battle at the Levant, Elise is killed.

Sergeant Mallen introduces Emily to the indigenes, intelligent humanoid creatures native to the swamps. During her time at the Levant, Emily corresponds with Northway and reunites with her brother-in-law, Mary's husband Tubal. Emily is inducted into the Survivors' Club, a group of upper-class soldiers. Other members include the quartermaster Rocky and Giles Scavian.

Emily proves herself capable in several more battles, earning promotions. Lascari, a warlock, tortures a Denlander prisoner to death. Emily is repulsed by his actions and begins to doubt the righteousness of her country's cause. She is captured by Denlanders. She meets Dr. Lam, the Denlander commander. He tells Emily that Luthrian has lied to her. Dr. Lam claims that Luthrian ordered the assassination of Denland's king and that Lascanne started the war.

Indigenes bring word of Emily's capture to Mallen. Mallen rescues Emily and returns her to the Lascanne camp. Lascari attempts to rape Emily, but she fights him off. Scavian arrives, and the warlocks duel. Lascari is shot and killed when Denlanders ambush the camp. After a savage battle, the Denlanders are driven back. At night, Emily and Scavian have sex.

Emily and Mallen discuss terms with Dr. Lam. Although their front has fought well, Denland has defeated other parts of the Lascanne army and controls most of the country. Emily surrenders. Emily and Tubal return to Grammaine. She reunites with Mr. Northway, who is now helping Denland administer their conquered territory. Northway admits that Lascanne started the war. He confesses that he loves her; she asks for time to consider.

Emily has difficulty reintegrating into society. Brocky arrives at Grammaine and reveals that Scavian has been arrested. The Denlanders are arresting the King's warlocks, fearful of a rebellion. Emily asks Northway for help, confessing that she loves Scavian.

Emily is recruited by a rebel group and brought before King Luthrian, who is staging a guerrilla campaign against the occupying Denlanders. She asks him to help rescue Scavian, but he declines. He brings forth Northway, accusing him of collaboration. He orders Emily to shoot Northway. Emily turns her gun on Luthrian and kills him. With the king dead, Scavian loses his magic and is be released. Emily states that Scavian's loyalty would always be divided between her and the king. She confesses to Northway that she loves him. Emily and Northway trudge back to Grammaine; she comments that her war is finally over.

== Background and publication history ==
Tchaikovsky began working on the novel in the mid-1990s.

In an interview with Bristol Book Blog, Tchaikovsky stated that he drew from real-life wars and periods in history when designing the novel. The overall setting is based on the Regency era, while the Levant front is based on the Vietnam War. The characters pay homage to the works of Jane Austen. Emily Marshwic is the middle of three sisters; the character of Mr. Northway is an homage to Mr. Collins.

== Reception and awards ==
Tadiana Jones of fantasyliterature.com gave the novel five stars, commenting on its combination of brutal combat and homages to Jane Austen. Jones felt that Emily Marshwic was similar to the character of Elizabeth Bennet. The review praised Tchaikovsky's well-rounded characters, as well as the subtle inclusion of magical elements. Jones stated that the author "has assembled an engrossing, enchanting novel." Ed Fortune of Starburst also compared Marshwic to Bennet, noting that the novel mashes up Pride and Prejudice with Sharpe. Fortune praised the worldbuilding which is never bogged down by exposition, despite the novel's length. The reviewer felt that some scenes could have been shorter, but that overall the novel was "strongly recommended."

Eugene Volokh reviewed the book for Reason, stating that it was darker in tone that the works of Austen, or than Temeraire by Naomi Novik. The review felt that the work was "Austenesque" due to its fascination with the characters' inner lives rather than their physical actions. Volokh also praised Tchaikovsky's ability to write a well-crafted female protagonist.

Adrian Collins of Grimdark Magazine described the novel's genre as "flintlock fantasy", writing that it is "sad, at times suffocating, and action-packed". Collins felt that the novel portrayed war realistically, praising the way in which Tchaikovsky explored PTSD and the characters' psyches as a result of combat. Collins compared the book to other works with similar themes, including Band of Brothers and All Quiet on the Western Front, concluding that the novel is a "magnificent read."

Writing for Strange Horizons, Martin Cahill stated that the novel uses familiar tropes to tell a satisfying story. Cahill was initially frustrated by the fact that novel's combat scenes appear relatively late in the story; he later realized that this was intentional and that Tchaikovsky used the opening third of the novel to successfully develop Emily's world. Cahill praised the novel's characterization and the romantic subplot, as well as Tchaikovsky's "elegant, dynamic, smart" prose.

Guns of the Dawn was shortlisted for the 2016 British Fantasy Award for Best Fantasy Novel.
