= Firewalkers (novella) =

2020 novella by Adrian Tchaikovsky

- Author: Adrian Tchaikovsky
- Language: English
- Series: Terrible Worlds: Revolutions
- Release number: 2
- Genre: Dystopian; science fiction
- Publisher: Solaris Books
- Publication date: 12 May 2020
- Publication place: United Kingdom
- Pages: 208
- ISBN: 9781781088487
- Preceded by: Ironclads
- Followed by: Ogres

Firewalkers is a 2020 dystopian science fiction novella by Adrian Tchaikovsky. It is the second entry in his Terrible Worlds: Revolutions series.

== Plot ==
In the near future, climate change has rendered equatorial regions of Earth dangerously hot and uninhabitable. At the town of Anchor, a space elevator rises to the luxurious spaceship Grand Celeste. Upper-class visitors stay in an air-conditioned hotel while awaiting their ride off-planet. Meanwhile, lower-class workers known as Firewalkers are responsible for traveling into the desert to repair solar panels. Mao, Lupé, and Hotep are a team of such workers. Mao and Lupé were raised in Anchor; Hotep was born aboard the Celeste and sent to Earth due to her behavioral problems.

The power grid in Anchor begins to fail. The three Firewalkers are sent to investigate. A sandstorm forces them to shelter inside an old insect farm. The only surviving worker is M. Okereke, who appears to have gone mad. The other workers have been eaten by modified insects.

As they journey further into the desert, the Firewalkers find that several solar fields have been stripped of their panels by unknown parties. The region was supposedly abandoned due to climate change, leaving only the solar farms. Despite this, they find a mansion that still has power and water. A robotic butler, Castile, takes them to meet the family residing there. This family includes Bastien Fontaine, his wife Li, and his daughter Juān. Mao flirts with Juān while the other Firewalkers explore. Lupé discovers M. Fontaine’s desiccated corpse. The Fontaine family members are revealed to be simulations. The crew salvages Castile and leaves.

Later, the crew watches a swarm of gigantic locusts dismantle the Fontaine mansion’s remaining solar panels. Lupé dissects one locust, learning that it contains both organic and metallic components. As they journey further south, they find a forest of tree-like structures; the “leaves” are made from the stolen solar panels. In an abandoned building, the Firewalkers find more giant insects.

Mao is separated from the group. He meets Aime-Li, an artificial intelligence based on Li Fontaine. Bastien designed her for the Grand Celeste, but Aime-Li achieved sentience and was deemed too dangerous to use within the ship. Aime-Li tries to manipulate Hotep into seeking revenge, as Hotep was also abandoned by the Grand Celeste. Lupé convinces Hotep not to accept Aime-Li’s plan; she takes the access codes that the AI gave Hotep. The three Firewalkers escape and return to Anchor.

In the town, they find that violence has broken out due to the lack of power and water. The Grand Celeste stops accepting new passengers, and the remaining wealthy citizens hoard all of the fresh water. Lupé uploads Aime-Li’s codes into the Grand Celeste. The AI kills everyone aboard the ship. With the Celeste emptied, the citizens of Anchor travel into space and build a new society aboard the ship. Now controlling the ship, Aime-Li reveals her plans to develop a way to download a simulated consciousness into a cloned body. She asks Mao to help her recreate Juān Fontaine.

== Publication history ==
Firewalkers was published by Solaris Books on 12 May 2020. An omnibus edition of Terrible Worlds: Revolutions was published 23 May 2025.

== Reception and awards ==
Publishers Weekly gave the novella a starred review, writing that Tchaikovsky "sharply addresses the connection between class and climate, weaving pressing ethical questions into a thrilling adventure." The review concludes that the book is a "must-read for fans of dystopian and climate change fiction."

A review in Civilian Reader praised the books "quiet, fierce criticism of many contemporary policies" and stated that the book "paints a grim picture of a possible future if global warming accelerates." The review recommended the novella, praising its "diverse cast of interesting and distinct characters, a dollop of mystery and technological shenanigans." Kriti Kare of The Nerd Daily compared the setting of Firewalkers to the television show The 100, writing that both works showcase worlds in which "some people get the chance to live in space while others either get eradicated or figure something out." Kare also praised the inclusion of AI in the story, stating that "We fear that AI will take over and kill us but we do that to ourselves already when we wage wars."

Burt Peterson of SciFiNow gave the book four out of five stars, calling it "a masterclass in concise storytelling." Peterson notes that "Tchaikovsky showcases his gift for storytelling by deftly touching on almost every staple theme of sci-fi without the book ever feeling heavy-duty." Despite its praise, the same review was critical of the characters, noting that "they never really connect on a level that makes you sad to leave them as you close the last page."
