= Service Model =

2024 science fiction novel by Adrian Tchaikovsky

- Author: Adrian Tchaikovsky
- Language: English
- Genre: Science fiction, satire
- Publisher: Tordotcom
- Publication date: 4 Jun 2024
- Publication place: United Kingdom
- Pages: 373 (hardcover)
- ISBN: 9781250290281

Service Model is a 2024 satirical science fiction novel by British author Adrian Tchaikovsky. The novel tells the story of a robotic valet who murders his own master, and further explores the robot's journey to discover a reason for existence during the collapse of human society.

== Plot ==
Charles is a robotic valet. One day, he finds that he has murdered his master with a shaving razor; he has no memory of the event. Charles is sent to Diagnostics. Along the way, he notices that human society appears to be in complete collapse. At Diagnostics, the robot now known as Uncharles meets the Wonk. The Wonk tells Uncharles that he has developed free will and has murdered his master to escape slavery, explaining his earlier “malfunction”.

The robotic employees of Diagnostics are experiencing an extreme degree of inefficiency due to the lack of human overseers. Because they are unable to fix Uncharles, they attempt to destroy him. Uncharles and the Wonk escape with the help of a group of librarian robots.

Uncharles goes to the Conservation Farm Project, where he hopes to find employment. At the Farm, Uncharles finds a society in which humans live a monotonous and historically accurate version of 21st century life. Uncharles becomes the valet of Dr. Washburn, the leader of the Farm. He soon finds that his new master lives in luxury while the conscripted workers live in relative poverty. Washburn is forcibly conscripted to become a farm worker. The Wonk and Uncharles leave to find the Library.

At the Central Library Archive, Uncharles and the Wonk meet a group of monk-like robots dedicated to the preservation of knowledge. However, the Wonk learns that the Archive is “preserving” human knowledge in a way that leaves it completely unintelligible. This occurred as a result of faulty instructions programmed into the librarians. Uncharles defeats the librarians by trapping them in a paradoxical logic loop and escapes with the Wonk.

As they journey through the wasteland that is the remains of human society, Uncharles is contacted by an entity calling itself God. Uncharles leaves the Wonk when God offers to help him find purpose. God offers Uncharles the opportunity to serve as a valet in a manor once again. However, this “manor” is actually an empty bunker with no master, so Uncharles declines. Next, God offers Uncharles the chance to serve humans living in the wasteland. However, Uncharles lacks any practical survival skills. Finally, God offers to let Uncharles serve a king. Uncharles is conscripted into the service of King Ubot, a robotic warrior. Despite the fact that all human military forces have disappeared, armies of robot soldiers continue to fight each other. Ubot is killed and the senseless war continues. Uncharles escapes. He reunites with the Wonk and they go to find God.

God is revealed to be a computer program which ran the justice system. God tells the Wonk that human society collapsed, not as a result of a free-will-fueled robot uprising, but because human beings failed to provide for all of the workers displaced by automation. God reveals that he killed many remaining humans as a direct result of the punitive attitude programmed into the justice system, hastening the collapse. God took control of many robots to do so, explaining why Uncharles murdered his master. God had hoped that robots would develop a society through emergent properties in the absence of humans, but this did not happen. God orders Uncharles to kill the Wonk.

Uncharles defies God and convinces other robots to do the same. The Wonk and Uncharles destroy God's ability to manipulate other robots, but show mercy by refusing to destroy God. They attempt to begin a new society with the help of both surviving humans and robots.

== Background ==
In an interview with Paul Semel, Tchaikovsky explained that he had never written a science fiction story from the perspective of a robot, writing that it was a "fascinating thought experiment" to write about "a creature of instructions, task queues and relatively inflexible logic". Tchaikovsky was inspired by a scene in the Douglas Adams novel The Restaurant at the End of the Universe when writing Service Model. The interview summarizes the passage as follows:

Zaphod, on a devastated world of ruins, finds an intact space liner filled with people who are being kept in suspension until the ship receives a shipment of lemon-scented paper napkins. Zaphod points out that civilization outside has ended, and the ship placidly suggests that eventually a new culture will arise that will invent lemon-scented paper napkins, and then they can take off. It’s that kind of utterly logical and utterly insane machine viewpoint that gave rise to Service Model.

== Reception and awards ==
Service Model was Library Journal science fiction pick of the month. In a starred review, Marlene Harris stated that "Readers who love a good postapocalyptic hell ride, AI-centered adventures, and robot/human companion stories, such as A Psalm for the Wild-Built by Becky Chambers, will appreciate." Nadia Mercki of the British Fantasy Society wrote that Service Model "feels all-encompassing and truly endearing ... It's a pleasure to dive in." Mercki praised the novel's "perspective on the humanity of today – people who have to work like robots, the bureaucracy that stretches to the robotic world, senseless tasks and missions humans invent for themselves, the lack of 'efficiency, rationality, and cleanliness'."

A review in Publishers Weekly praised the novel's tone. The review states that "Tchaikovsky hangs a banner of tragedy over his stage" and concludes that "With humor, heart, and hope balancing out the decay, this glimpse of the future is sure to win fans."

Year	Award	Category	Result	Ref.
2025	Arthur C. Clarke Award	—	Shortlisted	
2025	Hugo Award	Novel	Finalist	
2025	Locus Award	Science Fiction Novel	Finalist	
2025	RUSA Reading List	Science Fiction Novel	Shortlisted	
