= Adrian Tchaikovsky =

British fantasy and science fiction author (born 1972)

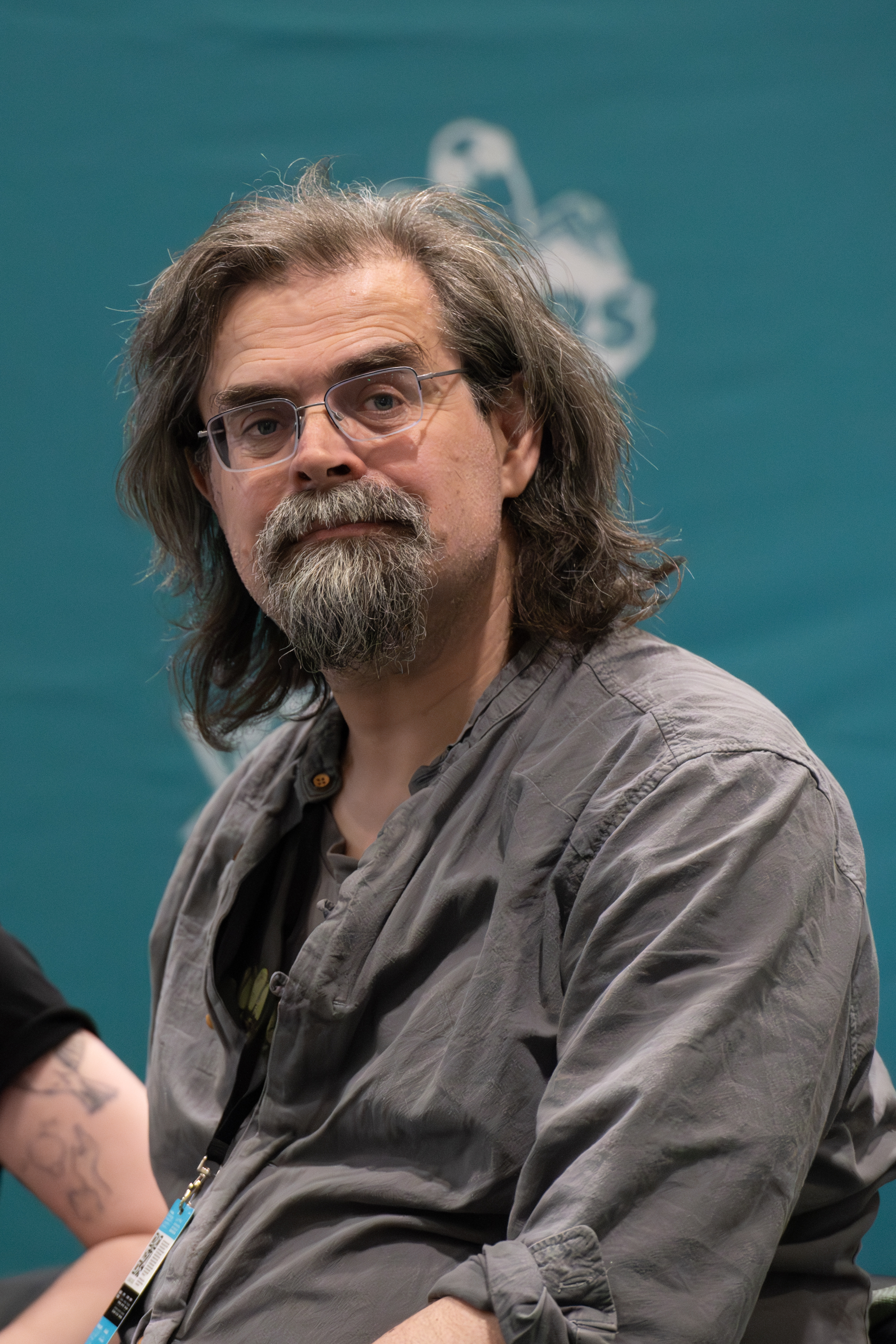
- At MCM Comic Con London, May 2025
- Born: 1972 (age 53–54); Woodhall Spa, Lincolnshire, England
- Education: University of Reading
- Occupations: Author and legal executive
- Children: 1
- Writing career
- Language: English
- Period: 2008 – present
- Genres: Fantasy and science fiction
- Subjects: Zoology and psychology
- Notable works: Shadows of the Apt series Children of Time
- Notable awards: Arthur C. Clarke Award (2016); Hugo Award for Best Series (2023) (Note: Tchaikovsky has since disavowed the award due to the subsequent controversy regarding that year's Hugo ballot.)
- Website: www.adriantchaikovsky.com

Adrian Czajkowski (writing as Tchaikovsky; born June 1972) is a British fantasy and science fiction author. Heavily influenced by the natural world, his books frequently deal with themes of artificial intelligence and alienness, often in the context of non-human characters. He is best known for his series Shadows of the Apt, and for his Hugo Award-winning Children of Time series.

Tchaikovsky has received numerous awards for his work. Children of Time was awarded the 30th Arthur C. Clarke Award in 2016. Author James Lovegrove described it as "superior stuff, tackling big themes – gods, messiahs, artificial intelligence, alienness – with brio".

== Biography ==
Adrian Czajkowski was born in Woodhall Spa, Lincolnshire in June 1972. He is of Polish descent. He cites the natural world as an early influence, along with naturalists such as Gerald Durrell and David Attenborough, and he was fascinated by the Natural History Museum. "From there", he says in interview, "wanting to understand the behaviour – the minds – of the nonhuman started to take precedence."

He studied zoology and psychology at the University of Reading although he eventually became disillusioned with the content of the course. He then qualified as a legal executive. He was employed as a legal executive for the Commercial Dispute Department of Blacks, Solicitors, of Leeds until late 2018 when he became a full-time writer.

Tchaikovsky's first foray into writing was in 1996 when he submitted several stories for publication in Xenos magazine. In the early 2000s, he won Xenos's annual competition with the short story The Roar of the Crowd, only for the magazine to fold pre-publication.

In 2008, after Tchaikovsky had spent fifteen years trying to get published, his novel Empire in Black and Gold was finally published by Tor Books (UK) – an imprint of Pan Macmillan – in the United Kingdom. The series was later published in America by Pyr Books. Tchaikovsky expressed the desire that the Polish editions of his novels feature the original Polish spelling of his surname, but these too used "Tchaikovsky".

On 23 January 2019, Tchaikovsky was awarded an Honorary Doctorate of the Arts by the University of Lincoln.

He lives in Leeds with his wife and son.

== Writing career ==
Tchaikovsky revealed the basis of Shadows of the Apt in an online essay entitled "Entering the Shadows" at Upcoming4.me.

Whilst studying at the University of Reading, he managed a role-playing game named Bugworld. The game concerned the story of the insect-people of the Lowlands threatened by the encroaching Wasp Empire. From this original scenario, the entire series of books grew.

Tchaikovsky still uses role-playing games to help develop his stories, but now also uses live action role-playing, which assists in describing the numerous action and battle sequences in his books. He has previously been involved with the LARP game Empire.

Tchaikovsky has regularly expressed his intention regarding the Shadows of the Apt series not to make technology better than magic, or vice versa: "This is another key element, really: the magic/tech divide is a concept that turns up here and there in fantasy, but usually one side is good (mostly magic) and the other (dirty polluting tech) is bad. With the world of the kinden, they're basically both as bad as the people who use them, whether it's blood sacrifice in a Mantis-kinden grove or the Wasp Empire's city-levelling weaponry."

In 2025, with Emma Newman, he launched a new podcast, Starship Alexandria. In this the presenters alternate presenting a work (novel, film, comic book) for the other to read and judge whether the work should be preserved for posterity.

== Themes ==
Themes in Tchaikovsky's books include: "the frailties of human bureaucracy and the difficulty we have in seeing beyond the human perspective," and "the terrible things we do to each other and the dogged resistance offered by the victim-participants in the vile mills of misery that are totalizing governments and wars of aggression." Critics have commented positively on his "definitive" depiction of alien civilizations and his treatment of "huge themes about belief, artificial intelligence, legacy, discovery, alienness and much more." In an interview with Jon Sutton for the British Psychological Society, Tchaikovsky says that "Human perception of time is one of the biggest limitations of being human," and that this shortcoming lies behind many current problems, such as climate change.

== Awards and nominations ==
Tchaikovsky has received the following literary awards and nominations:

Table key
§	Indicates a declined award

Year	Work	Award	Category	Result	Ref.
2014	"Family Business"	British Fantasy Award	Short Story	Shortlisted	
2016	Children of Time	Arthur C. Clarke Award	—	Won	
2016	Guns of the Dawn	British Fantasy Award	Fantasy Novel	Shortlisted	
2017	The Tiger and the Wolf	British Fantasy Award	Fantasy Novel	Won	
2019	Children of Ruin	BSFA Award	Novel	Won	
2020	Cage of Souls	Arthur C. Clarke Award	—	Shortlisted	
2020	The Doors of Eden	Sidewise Award for Alternate History	Long-form	Won	
2021	The Doors of Eden	Philip K. Dick Award	—	Nominated	
2021	Shards of Earth	BSFA Award	Novel	Won	
2022	City of Last Chances	BSFA Award	Novel	Won	
2022	Elder Race	Hugo Award	Novella	Finalist	
2022	Elder Race	Ursula K. Le Guin Prize	—	Shortlisted	
2022	Ogres	BSFA Award	Short Fiction	Shortlisted	
2022	Shards of Earth	Dragon Award	Science Fiction Novel	Nominated	
2022	Shards of Earth	Locus Award	Science Fiction Novel	Finalist	
2023	And Put Away Childish Things	BSFA Award	Shorter Fiction	Won	
2023	Children of Memory	Dragon Award	Science Fiction Novel	Nominated	
2023	The Children of Time series	Hugo Award	Series	Won_{§}	
2023	Eyes of the Void	Locus Award	Science Fiction Novel	Finalist	
2023	Ogres	British Fantasy Award	Novella	Shortlisted	
2023	Ogres	Hugo Award	Novella	Finalist	
2023	Ogres	Locus Award	Novella	Finalist	
2024	Alien Clay	BSFA Award	Novel	Shortlisted_{§} (Note: Alien Clay was originally nominated for the 2024 BSFA Award for Best Novel, but was removed from the ballot at the request of the author.)	
2024	City of Last Chances	Locus Award	Fantasy Novel	Finalist	
2024	The Final Architecture	Hugo Award	Series	Finalist	
2024	House of Open Wounds	Dragon Award	Fantasy Novel	Nominated	
2024	Lords of Uncreation	Locus Award	Science Fiction Novel	Finalist	
2024	Saturation Point	BSFA Award	Shorter Fiction	Won	
2025	Alien Clay	Hugo Award	Novel	Finalist	
2025	Alien Clay	Locus Award	Science Fiction Novel	Finalist	
2025	Alien Clay	Philip K. Dick Award	—	Special Citation	
2025	Service Model	Arthur C. Clarke Award	—	Shortlisted	
2025	Service Model	Hugo Award	Novel	Finalist	
2025	Service Model	Locus Award	Science Fiction Novel	Finalist	
2025	Service Model	RUSA Reading List	Science Fiction Novel	Shortlisted	
2025	The Tyrant Philosophers	Hugo Award	Series	Finalist	
2026	Lives of Bitter Rain	Locus Award	Novella	Finalist	
2026	Shroud	Hugo Award	Novel	Finalist	
2026	Shroud	Locus Award	Science Fiction Novel	Finalist	
2026	Shroud	Aldiss Award	—	Shortlisted	

== Film adaptations ==
In June 2025, Universal Pictures acquired the rights to adapt Saturation Point. Cynthia Erivo and Michael Bay were attached as producers. Minnie Schedeen was set to write the script, which will be her debut as a screenwriter.

== Bibliography ==
=== Novels ===
Shadows of the Apt

- Novels
  - — (1 January 2008). Empire in Black and Gold. Tor Books. ISBN 9780230736467.
  - — (3 March 2009). Dragonfly Falling. Tor Books. ISBN 9780230704152.
  - — (7 August 2009). Blood of the Mantis. Tor Books. ISBN 9780230704169.
  - — (5 February 2010). Salute the Dark. Tor Books. ISBN 9780330511445.
  - — (6 August 2010). The Scarab Path. Tor Books. ISBN 9780330511452.
  - — (4 February 2011). The Sea Watch. Tor Books. ISBN 9780330511469.
  - — (7 October 2011). Heirs of the Blade. Tor Books. ISBN 9780230756991.
  - — (2 August 2012). The Air War. Tor Books. ISBN 9780230757004.
  - — (1 August 2013). War Master's Gate. Tor Books. ISBN 9780230757011.
  - — (3 July 2014). Seal of the Worm. Tor Books. ISBN 9780230770010.
- Tales of the Apt (short story collections)
  - — (11 July 2016). Spoils of War. NewCon Press. ISBN 9781910935217.
  - — (24 April 2017). A Time for Grief. NewCon Press. ISBN 9781910935460.
  - — (10 April 2018). For Love of Distant Shores. NewCon Press. ISBN 9781910935712.
  - — (23 October 2018). The Scent of Tears. NewCon Press. ISBN 9781910935934.

Children of Time

- — (4 June 2015). Children of Time. Tor UK. ISBN 9781447273288.
- — (14 May 2019). Children of Ruin. Tor UK. ISBN 9781509865857.
- — (24 November 2022). Children of Memory. Tor UK. ISBN 9781529087178.
- — (17 March 2026). Children of Strife. Tor UK. ISBN 9781035057788.

Echoes of the Fall

- — (11 February 2016). The Tiger and the Wolf. Tor UK. ISBN 9780230770065.
- — (10 August 2017). The Bear and the Serpent. Tor UK. ISBN 9781509830220.
- — (5 April 2018). The Hyena and the Hawk. Tor UK. ISBN 9781509830268.

Bioforms

- — (2 November 2017). Dogs of War. Head of Zeus. ISBN 9781786693884.
- — (7 January 2021). Bear Head. Head of Zeus. ISBN 9781800241541.
- — (3 June 2025). Bee Speaker. Head of Zeus. ISBN 9781035901456.

The Tyrant Philosophers

- Main novels
  - — (8 December 2022). City of Last Chances. Head of Zeus. ISBN 9781801108423.
  - — (7 December 2023). House of Open Wounds. Head of Zeus. ISBN 9781035901388.
  - — (5 December 2024). Days of Shattered Faith. Head of Zeus. ISBN 9781035901524.
  - — (12 February 2026). Pretenders to the Throne of God. Head of Zeus. ISBN 9781035914975.
  - Forthcoming: — (9 February 2027). The Grave of Perfection. Head of Zeus. ISBN 9781035915040.
- Novellas
  - — (14 October 2025). Lives of Bitter Rain. Head of Zeus. ISBN 9781035911448.

The Final Architecture

- — (27 May 2021). Shards of Earth. Tor Books. ISBN 9781529051889.
- — (3 May 2022). Eyes of the Void. Tor Books. ISBN 9781529051933.
- — (2 May 2023). Lords of Uncreation. Tor Books. ISBN 9781529051988.

Standalone novels

- — (2013). Spiderlight. Aethernet. ISBN 9780765388353. (Note: Originally published in 2013 as a serial in Aethernet; later published in 2016 by Tor Books.)
- — (12 February 2015). Guns of the Dawn. Tor UK. ISBN 9780230770034.
- — (4 April 2019). Cage of Souls. Head of Zeus. ISBN 9781788547246.
- — (18 August 2020). The Doors of Eden. Orbit Books. ISBN 9781509865888.
- — (28 March 2024). Alien Clay. Orbit Books. ISBN 9780316578967.
- — (4 June 2024). Service Model. Tordotcom. ISBN 9781250290281.
- — (27 February 2025). Shroud. Tor Books. ISBN 9781035013791.
- — (3 June 2026). Green City Wars. Tor Books. ISBN 9781250290335.
- Forthcoming: — (9 March 2027). The Eighth Face. Orbit Books. ISBN 9780316587471.

Black Library

- — (1 February 2022). Day of Ascension. Black Library. ISBN 9781800260917.
- — (26 October 2024). "On the Shoulders of Giants". On the Shoulders of Giants and Other Stories. Black Library. ISBN 9781836090014. (Note: Tchaikovsky's work is a novella included in a multi-author anthology)
- — (14 November 2025). Starseer's Ruin. Black Library. ISBN 9781836093718.

Multi-author series

- — (1 July 2014). The Bloody Deluge. The Afterblight Chronicles. Abaddon Books. ISBN 9781849977647.
- — (24 July 2018). Redemption's Blade. After the War. Solaris Books. ISBN 9781781085790.

=== Novellas ===
Expert Systems

- — (17 June 2018). The Expert System's Brother. Tordotcom. ISBN 9781250197566.
- — (26 January 2021). The Expert System's Champion. Tordotcom. ISBN 9781250766397.

Terrible Worlds

- Revolutions
  - — (7 November 2017). Ironclads. Solaris Books. ISBN 9781781085684.
  - — (12 May 2020). Firewalkers. Solaris Books. ISBN 9781781088487.
  - — (15 March 2022). Ogres. Solaris Books. ISBN 9781786185280.
- Destinations
  - — (18 May 2019). Walking to Aldebaran. Solaris Books. ISBN 9781781087060.
  - — (2 March 2021). One Day All This Will Be Yours. Solaris Books. ISBN 9781781088746.
  - — (28 March 2023). And Put Away Childish Things. Solaris Books. ISBN 9781786188793..
- Transformations
  - — (30 March 2024). Saturation Point. Solaris Books. ISBN 9781837861743..
  - — (11 August 2026). Preaching to the Choir. Solaris Books. ISBN 9781837867301.
- Innovations
  - — (12 August 2025). The Hungry Gods. Solaris Books. ISBN 9781837865512..

Elder Race

- — (16 November 2021). Elder Race. Tordotcom. ISBN 9781250768728.
- — (1 September 2026). Engines of Reason. Tordotcom. ISBN 9781250388292.

Standalone Novellas

- — (5 November 2019). Made Things. Tor Books. ISBN 9781250232991.
- — (12 June 2021). The House on the Old Cliffs. BOTH Press. ISBN 9781913603045.

=== Short stories ===
- — (31 August 2014). "Where the Brass Band Plays". In Edwards, Jan; Barber, Jenny (eds.). The Alchemy Press Book of Urban Mythic 2. Alchemy Press. ISBN 9780957348998.
- — (7 October 2014). "The Final Conjuration". In Moore, David Thomas (ed.). Two Hundred and Twenty-One Baker Streets: An Anthology of Holmesian Tales Across Time and Space. Abaddon Books. ISBN 9781781082225.
- — (8 March 2016). "Even in the Cannon's Mouth". In Oliver, Jonathan; Moore, David Thomas (eds.). Monstrous Little Voices: New Tales from Shakespeare's Fantasy World. Abaddon Books. ISBN 9781849979993.
- — (14 March 2017). "Shadow Hunter". Grimdark Magazine. Shadows of the Apt. No. 1.
- — (20 November 2019). "Precious Little Things". Made Things. Reactor.
- — (4 September 2023). "The Long and Hungry Road: A Tyranids Short Story". Warhammer 40,000. Black Library. ASIN B0CG98YV51.
- — (30 April 2025). Harris, Lee (ed.). "Human Resources". Service Model. Illustrated by George Wylesol. Reactor. ISBN 9781250375933.

=== Collections ===
- — (2 September 2013). Feast and Famine. NewCon Press. ISBN 9781907069543.
- —; McDonald, Keris; Gauntless, Adam (3 September 2016). The Private Life of Elder Things. Alchemy Press. ISBN 9781911034025.
- — (28 February 2026). The Best of Adrian Tchaikovsky. Subterranean Press. ISBN 9781645243120.

== Critical studies and reviews of Tchaikovsky's work ==
The Doors of Eden

- West, Michelle (July–August 2020). "Musing on Books". F&SF. 139 (1&2): 88‒94. Archived from the original on 18 July 2020.
