= Elder Race (novella) =

2021 novella by Adrian Tchaikovsky

- Author: Adrian Tchaikovsky
- Language: English
- Publisher: Tordotcom
- Publication date: 16 Nov 2021
- Pages: 208
- ISBN: 9781250768728

Elder Race is a 2021 novella by British author Adrian Tchaikovsky. It was a finalist for the 2022 Hugo Award for Best Novella and was shortlisted for the inaugural Ursula K. Le Guin Prize.

== Plot ==
Earth sends generation ships to space to establish colony worlds. After Earth's society collapses, these colonies are separated from their home planet. Centuries later, Earth rebuilds and seeks information about these lost colonies. Nyr Illim Tevich is an anthropologist from Earth currently living on the colony world Sophos 4. His foremost instruction is non-intervention; he is to record the history and culture of the planet without interacting.

Lynesse “Lyn” Fourth Daughter is a princess of the Royal Line of Lannesite. She and Esha Free Mark visit the Tower of Nyrgoth Elder, whom they view as a powerful and ancient sorcerer. Lyn requests that Nyr honour a promise made to her great-grandmother. A century ago, Nyr had helped the queen Astresse fight off a warlord in violation of his instructions. Nyr wakes from suspension to find that Earth has not contacted him in the previous three centuries. Lyn tells Nyr that a demon is attacking the countryside; he agrees to help.

Lyn promises a crowd of villagers that Nyr will save them from the demon. Nyr snaps and tells her that there is no such thing as magic. He tells them the true story about their colony's origins. Due to cultural and linguistic barriers, Lyn and Esha do not understand his concerns.

They are led to the demon's location by a man named Allwer. Along the way, they see wildlife and humans mutilated and combined into various shapes; the “demon” is infecting them and changing them. Nyr cannot understand the entity, believing it to be similar to a virus. He learns that the demonic infection is transmitted through radiation. Esha contracts the disease, but Nyr is able to restrict the infection's EM field and save her. They find an arch that leads to an unknown dimension; the radiation is coming from within.

Lyn cuts some of Nyr's equipment out of his body; Nyr uses the anthropologists’ anti-contamination measures to destroy the arch with a missile from a satellite. Because of that act, Nyr is permanently cut off from contacting his satellite and gives up hope of ever hearing from Earth. He decides that he will no longer be a detached anthropologist, but he will instead return to the queen's court with Lyn and experience life firsthand.

== Major themes ==
According to Lucy Nield, language barriers and cultural differences play a large role in the story. The split narrative, alternating between Nyr's chapters and Lyn's chapters, allows the reader to "comprehend the intention of each character". Nield also gives an example of scenes in which the language barrier is apparent in the narrative:

Nyr’s hypothesis is that, should he attempt to dispel Lyn and Esha of their belief that he is an ancient wizard, he might end up saying “I’m not a wizard; I’m a wizard, or at best a wizard,” an imagined interaction that he finds less than amusing.

In a later scene, Nyr violates the principal role of anthropology and tells Lyn and Esha the truth about the history of Sophos 4.

Nyr tells stories of humans arriving from Earth, then adapting to their new planet, engineering body modifications for humans and the native livestock, as well as the machinery used in the colonisation process, but all Esha and Lyn hear is that the Elders used “magic” to travel from the “otherworld” (111) and began “teaching the beasts and plants their place, naming them and giving them their roles,” and about the “monsters” that did the will of men (112). Nyr tries his best to remove magic from the conversation, but once he is finished, Lyn simply states, “yes, that is how we tell it,” unable to grasp the concepts he has tried so delicately and desperately to explain (115).

Nield concludes by stating that Tchaikovsky uses these juxtapositions to explore ideas including Arthur C. Clarke's well-known adage that any sufficiently advanced technology is indistinguishable from magic. Furthermore, Tchaikovsky uses the language and cultural barriers to draw distinctions between science fiction and fantasy genre tropes.

Tobias Carroll of Tor.com also writes about the language barrier present in the novel; sometimes, it is used for comedic effect. Nyr's translations into Lyn's dialect are always "a little fancier" than intended. For example, Nyr intends to say “Why are you here?”, but Lynesse hears “For what purpose do you disturb the Elder?”

Carroll also discusses the way in which Nyr's experience with clinical depression impacts the narrative. Nyr has a modified biochemical system called the Dissociative Cognition System (DCS) that can separate him from his own emotional experiences. Nyr attempts to describe depression to Lyn, yet there is no word for it in her language.

== Structure ==
The story alternates between the viewpoints of Lyn and Nyr. Lyn's chapters are told in third person, while Nyr's are narrated in first person.

== Background ==
The novella was inspired by Gene Wolfe's 1967 short story "Trip, Trap". The earlier story also features a dual narrative split between events in a fantasy-medieval setting and a futuristic setting headlined by an anthropologist.

== Reception ==
Lucy Nield of the Science Fiction Research Association praised Tchaikovsky as a "commanding, imaginative writer, who can master and manipulate genre in any way he sees fit".

Writing for Locus, Russell Lesson called the book a "tale with a lot of heart" and praised its mashup of the science fiction and fantasy genres. Publishers Weekly called Tchaikovsky a "master of the genre mash-up", writing that he "wows with this inventive and empathetic story of courage, science, and magic".

A review for Tor.com called the novella's conclusion "unexpectedly moving" and praised the growth of the relationship between Lyn and Nyr over the course of the story.

Year	Award	Result	Ref.
2022	Hugo Award for Best Novella	Finalist	
2022	Ursula K. Le Guin Prize	Shortlisted	

== See also ==
- Elder race
- Prime Directive
