= BSFA Award =

British science fiction awards

BSFA Awards
- Awarded for: Awarded each year to the best Novel, Short fiction, Audio fiction, Collection, Artwork and work of Non-Fiction published in the previous calendar year as voted for by the members of the British Science Fiction Association.
- Country: UK
- Presented by: British Science Fiction Association
- First award: 1970
- Website: bsfa.co.uk/awards

The BSFA Awards are literary awards presented annually since 1970 by the British Science Fiction Association (BSFA) to honour works in the genre of science fiction. Nominees and winners are chosen based on a vote of BSFA members. More recently, members of the Eastercon convention have also been eligible to vote.

== BSFA Award categories ==
The award originally included only a category for novels. A category for artists was added in 1979 and for short works in 1980. A category for younger readers was added in 2021. The artists category became artwork in 1986, and a category for related non-fiction was added in 2002. A number of new awards were created in 2023. A media category was awarded for 1978 to 1991. The ceremonies are named after the year that the eligible works were published, despite the awards being given out in the next year. The current standard award categories are:

- BSFA Award for Best Novel (from 1969)
- BSFA Award for Best Shorter Fiction (from 2023)
- BSFA Award for Best Short Fiction (from 1980)
- BSFA Award for Best Collection (from 2023)
- BSFA Award for Best Fiction for Younger Readers (from 2021)
- BSFA Award for Best Translated Short Fiction (from 2023)
- BSFA Award for Best Artwork (from 1979)
- BSFA Award for Best Original Audio Fiction (from 2023)
- BSFA Award for Best Long Non-Fiction (from 2001)
- BSFA Award for Best Short Non-Fiction (from 2023)

Previous categories:

- BSFA Award for Best Media (1978 to 1991)

== BSFA Award winners ==
Year	Category	Work	Author(s)
1969	Novel	Stand on Zanzibar	John Brunner
1970	Novel	The Jagged Orbit	John Brunner
1971	Collection	The Moment of Eclipse	Brian W. Aldiss
1972	No award — insufficient votes.		
1973	Novel	Rendezvous with Rama	Arthur C. Clarke
1973	Special Award	Billion Year Spree	Brian W. Aldiss
1974	Novel	Inverted World	Christopher Priest
1975	Novel	Orbitsville	Bob Shaw
1976	Novel	Brontomek!	Michael G. Coney
1976	Special Award	A Pictorial History of Science Fiction	David Kyle
1977	Novel	The Jonah Kit	Ian Watson
1978	Novel	A Scanner Darkly	Philip K. Dick
1978	Collection	Deathbird Stories	Harlan Ellison
1978	Media	The Hitchhiker's Guide to the Galaxy (original radio series)	Douglas Adams
1979	Novel	The Unlimited Dream Company	J. G. Ballard
1979	Short	"Palely Loitering"	Christopher Priest (F&SF)
1979	Media	The Hitchhiker's Guide to the Galaxy	
1979	Artist		Jim Burns
1980	Novel	Timescape	Gregory Benford
1980	Short	"The Brave Little Toaster"	Thomas M. Disch (F&SF)
1980	Media	The Hitchhiker's Guide to the Galaxy second radio series	Douglas Adams
1980	Artist		Peter Jones
1981	Novel	The Shadow of the Torturer	Gene Wolfe
1981	Short	"Mythago Wood"	Robert Holdstock (F&SF)
1981	Media	Time Bandits film	
1981	Artist		Bruce Pennington
1982	Novel	Helliconia Spring	Brian W. Aldiss
1982	Short	"Kitemaster"	Keith Roberts (Interzone 1)
1982	Media	Blade Runner film	
1982	Artist		Tim White
1983	Novel	Tik-Tok	John Sladek
1983	Short	"After-Images"	Malcolm Edwards (Interzone 4)
1983	Media	Android film	
1983	Artist		Bruce Pennington
1984	Novel	Mythago Wood	Robert Holdstock
1984	Short	"The Unconquered Country"	Geoff Ryman (Interzone 7)
1984	Media	The Company of Wolves film	
1984	Artist	Jim Burns	
1985	Novel	Helliconia Winter	Brian W. Aldiss
1985	Short	"Cube Root"	David Langford (Interzone 11)
1985	Media	Brazil film	
1985	Artist		Jim Burns
1986	Novel	The Ragged Astronauts	Bob Shaw
1986	Short	"Kaeti and the Hangman"	Keith Roberts (in collection Kaeti & Company)
1986	Media	Aliens film	
1986	Artist		The Clocktower Girl by Keith Roberts
1987	Novel	Grainne	Keith Roberts
1987	Short	"Love Sickness"	Geoff Ryman (Interzone 20/21)
1987	Media	Star Cops television series	
1987	Artwork	Cover of Worldcon Programme Book	Jim Burns
1988	Novel	Lavondyss	Robert Holdstock
1988	Short	"Dark Night in Toyland"	Bob Shaw (Interzone 26)
1988	Media	Who Framed Roger Rabbit film	
1988	Artwork	Cover of Lavondyss	Alan Lee
1989	Novel	Pyramids	Terry Pratchett
1989	Short	"In Translation"	Lisa Tuttle (Zenith)
1989	Media	Red Dwarf television series	
1989	Artwork	Cover of Other Edens III	Jim Burns
1990	Novel	Take Back Plenty	Colin Greenland
1990	Short	"The Original Doctor Shade"	Kim Newman (Interzone 36)
1990	Media	Twin Peaks television series	
1990	Artist	Covers of The Difference Engine and Interzone 40	Ian Miller
1991	Novel	The Fall of Hyperion	Dan Simmons
1991	Short	"Bad Timing"	Molly Brown (Interzone 54)
1991	Media	Terminator 2: Judgment Day film	
1991	Artwork	Cover of Interzone 45	Mark Harrison
1992	Novel	Red Mars	Kim Stanley Robinson
1992	Short	"Innocents"	Ian McDonald (New Worlds 2)
1992	Artwork	Cover of Hearts, Hands and Voices	Jim Burns
1993	Novel	Aztec Century	Christopher Evans
1993	Short	"The Ragthorn"	Robert Holdstock and Garry Kilworth (Interzone 74)
1993	Artwork	Cover for Red Dust by Paul J. McAuley	Jim Burns
1993	Special Award	The Encyclopedia of Science Fiction	ed. John Clute and Peter Nicholls
1994	Novel	Feersum Endjinn	Iain M. Banks
1994	Short	"The Double Felix"	Paul di Filippo (Interzone 87)
1994	Artist	Cover for Interzone 79	Jim Burns
1995	Novel	The Time Ships	Stephen Baxter
1995	Short	"The Hunger and Ecstasy of Vampires"	Brian Stableford (shorter version, Interzone 91/92)
1995	Artist	cover for Seasons of Plenty	Jim Burns
1996	Novel	Excession	Iain M. Banks
1996	Short	"A Crab Must Try"	Barrington J. Bayley (Interzone 103)
1996	Artist	cover for Ancient Shores	Jim Burns
1997	Novel	The Sparrow	Mary Doria Russell
1997	Short	"War Birds"	Stephen Baxter (Interzone 126)
1997	Artist	'The Black Blood of the Dead' cover Interzone 116	SMS
1998	Novel	The Extremes	Christopher Priest
1998	Short	"La Cenerentola"	Gwyneth Jones (Interzone 136)
1998	Artwork	'Lord Prestimion' (cover, Interzone 138)	Jim Burns
1999	Novel	The Sky Road	Ken MacLeod
1999	Short	"Hunting the Slarque"	Eric Brown (Interzone 141)
1999	Artwork	Darwinia (cover of Darwinia, Robert Charles Wilson)	Jim Burns
2000	Novel	Ash: A Secret History	Mary Gentle
2000	Short	"The Suspect Genome"	Peter F. Hamilton (Interzone 156)
2000	Artwork	Hideaway (Cover, Interzone 157)	Dominic Harman
2001	Novel	Chasm City	Alastair Reynolds
2001	Short Story	"Children of Winter"	Eric Brown (Interzone 163)
2001	Artwork	cover of Omegatropic	Colin Odell
2001	Non-fiction	Omegatropic	Stephen Baxter
2002	Novel	The Separation	Christopher Priest
2002	Short Fiction	Coraline	Neil Gaiman
2002	Artwork	cover, Interzone 179	Dominic Harman
2002	Related Publication	Introduction to Maps: The Uncollected John Sladek	David Langford
2003	Novel	Felaheen	Jon Courtenay Grimwood
2003	Short Fiction	The Wolves in the Walls	Neil Gaiman & Dave McKean
2003	Artwork	cover, The True Knowledge of Ken MacLeod	Colin Odell
2003	Non-fiction	Reading Science Fiction	Farah Mendlesohn
2004	Novel	River of Gods	Ian McDonald
2004	Short Fiction	Mayflower II	Stephen Baxter
2004	Artwork	cover, Newton's Wake (US Edition)	Stephan Martinière
2005	Novel	Air	Geoff Ryman
2005	Short Fiction	Magic for Beginners	Kelly Link
2005	Artwork	cover, Interzone 200	Pawel Lewandowski
2005	Non-fiction Award	Soundings: Reviews 1992-1996	Gary K. Wolfe
2006	Novel	End of the World Blues	Jon Courtenay Grimwood
2006	Short Fiction	The Djinn's Wife (Asimov's Science Fiction, July 2006)	Ian McDonald
2006	Artwork	Angelbot, cover of Time Pieces	Christopher "Fangorn" Baker
2007	Novel	Brasyl	Ian McDonald
2007	Short Fiction	Lighting Out	Ken MacLeod (disLocations)
2007	Artwork	Cracked World, cover of disLocations	Andy Bigwood
2008	Novel	The Night Sessions	Ken MacLeod
2008	Short Fiction	Exhalation	Ted Chiang
2008	Artwork	cover of Subterfuge	Andy Bigwood
2008	Non-fiction	Rhetorics of Fantasy	Farah Mendlesohn
2009	Novel	The City & the City	China Miéville
2009	Short Fiction	The Beloved Time of Their Lives	Ian Watson and Roberto Quaglia
2009	Artwork	cover of Desolation Road	Stephan Martinière
2009	Non-fiction	Mutant Popcorn	Nick Lowe
2010	Novel	The Dervish House	Ian McDonald
2010	Short Fiction	The Ship Maker	Aliette de Bodard
2010	Artwork	cover of Zoo City	Joey Hi-Fi
2010	Non-Fiction	Blogging the Hugos: Decline	Paul Kincaid
2011	Novel	The Islanders	Christopher Priest
2011	Short Fiction	The Copenhagen Interpretation	Paul Cornell
2011	Artwork	cover of The Noise Revealed	Dominic Harman
2011	Non-Fiction	The Encyclopedia of Science Fiction 3rd edition	John Clute, Peter Nicholls, David Langford and Graham Sleight
2012	Novel	Jack Glass	Adam Roberts
2012	Short Fiction	Adrift on the Sea of Rains	Ian Sales
2012	Artwork	cover of Jack Glass	Blacksheep
2012	Non-Fiction	The World SF Blog	chief editor Lavie Tidhar
2013	Novels (tie)	Ancillary Justice	Ann Leckie
2013	Novels (tie)	Ack-Ack Macaque	Gareth L. Powell
2013	Short Fiction	Spin	Nina Allan
2013	Artwork	cover of Dream London	Joey Hi-Fi
2013	Non-Fiction	Wonderbook	Jeff VanderMeer
2014	Novel	Ancillary Sword	Ann Leckie
2014	Short Fiction	The Honey Trap	Ruth E. J. Booth, La Femme
2014	Artwork	The Wasp Factory after Iain Banks	Tessa Farmer
2014	Non-Fiction	Science Fiction and Fantasy Writers and the First World War	Edward James
2015	Novel	House of Shattered Wings	Aliette de Bodard
2015	Short Fiction	Three Cups of Grief, by Starlight	Aliette de Bodard
2015	Artwork	cover of Pelquin's Comet	Jim Burns
2015	Non-Fiction	Rave and Let Die: the SF and Fantasy of 2014	Adam Roberts
2016	Novel	Europe in Winter	Dave Hutchinson
2016	Short Fiction	Liberty Bird	Jaine Fenn
2016	Artwork	cover of Central Station	Sarah Anne Langton
2016	Non-Fiction	100 African Writers of SFF	Geoff Ryman
2017	Novel	The Rift	Nina Allan
2017	Short Fiction	The Enclave	Anne Charnock
2017	Artwork (tie)	Cover of The Ion Raider	Jim Burns
2017	Artwork (tie)	Waiting on a Bright Moon	Victo Ngai
2017	Non-Fiction	Iain M. Banks (University of Illinois Press)	Paul Kincaid
2018	Novel	Embers of War	Gareth L Powell
2018	Short Fiction	Time Was	Ian McDonald
2018	Artwork	In the Vanishers' Palace: Dragon I and II	Likhain
2018	Non-Fiction	On motherhood and erasure: people-shaped holes, hollow characters and the illusion of impossible adventures	Aliette de Bodard
2019	Novel	Children of Ruin	Adrian Tchaikovsky
2019	Shorter Fiction	This Is How You Lose the Time War	Amal El-Mohtar & Max Gladstone
2019	Artwork	Cover of Wourism and Other Stories (Luna Press)	Chris "Fangorn" Baker
2019	Non-Fiction	The Pleasant Profession of Robert A. Heinlein	Farah Mendlesohn
2020	Novel	The City We Became	N. K. Jemisin
2020	Short Fiction	Infinite Tea in the Demara Cafe	Ida Keogh
2020	Artwork	Shipbuilding over the Clyde	Iain Clark
2020	Non-Fiction	It's the End of the World: But What Are We Really Afraid Of	Adam Roberts
2021	Novel	Shards of Earth	Adrian Tchaikovsky
2021	Short Fiction	Fireheart Tiger	Aliette de Bodard
2021	Best Fiction for Younger Readers	Iron Widow	Xiran Jay Zhao
2021	Artwork	Glasgow Green Woman	Iain Clark
2021	Non-Fiction	Worlds Apart: Worldbuilding in Fantasy and Science Fiction	edited by Francesca T. Barbini
2022	Novel	City of Last Chances	Adrian Tchaikovsky
2022	Short Fiction	Of Charms, Ghosts and Grievances	Aliette de Bodard
2022	Best Fiction for Younger Readers	Unraveller	Frances Hardinge
2022	Artwork	Cover of The Red Scholar's Wake (Gollancz)	Alyssa Winans
2022	Non-Fiction	Terry Pratchett: A Life with Footnotes	Rob Wilkins
2023	Novel	The Green Man's Quarry	Juliet E. McKenna
2023	Shorter Fiction	And Put Away Childish Things	Adrian Tchaikovsky
2023	Short Fiction	"How to Raise a Kraken in Your Bathtub"	P. Djèlí Clark
2023	Collection	The Best of British Science Fiction 2022	Donna Scott
2023	Best Fiction for Younger Readers	The Library of Broken Worlds	Alaya Dawn Johnson
2023	Long Non-Fiction	A Traveller in Time: The Critical Practice of Maureen Kincaid Speller	Nina Allan
2023	Short Non-Fiction	Project Management Lessons from Rogue One	Fiona Moore
2023	Translated Short Fiction	Vanishing Tracks in the Sand	Jana Bianchi, tr. Rachael Amoruso
2023	Artwork	Cover of The Surviving Sky (Titan)	Leo Nickolls
2023	Original Audio Fiction	The Dex Legacy	Emily Inkpen
2024	Novel	Three Eight One	Aliya Whiteley
2024	Shorter Fiction	Saturation Point	Adrian Tchaikovsky
2024	Short Fiction	Why Don't We Just Kill the Kid In the Omelas Hole	Isabel J. Kim
2024	Collection	Punks4Palestine: An Anthology of Hopeful SciFi for an Uncertain Future	Jasen Bacon
2024	Best Fiction for Younger Readers	Doctor Who: Caged	Una McCormack
2024	Long Non-Fiction	Track Changes	Abigail Nussbaum
2024	Short Non-Fiction	Why A.I. Isn’t Going to Make Art	Ted Chiang
2024	Translated Short Fiction	Bone by Bone	Mónika Rusval, translated from Hungarian by Vivien Urban
2024	Artwork	Cover of Nova Scotia Vol 2	Jenni Coutts
2024	Original Audio Fiction	The Personal Touch	Rick Danforth
2025	Novel	When There Are Wolves Again	E. J. Swift
2025	Shorter Fiction	The Apologists	Tade Thompson
2025	Short Fiction	Godzilla as a Young Man Named Mike	E.M. Faulds
2025	Collection/Anthology	Blood in the Bricks	Neil Williamson
2025	Fiction for Younger Readers	Doctor Who: The Robot Revolution	Una McCormack
2025	Long Non-Fiction	Colourfields: Writing About Writing About Science Fiction	Paul Kincaid
2025	Short Non-Fiction	Spec Fic and the Politics of Identity: Finding the Self in Other	Eugen Bacon
2025	Translated Short Fiction	Liecraft	Anita Moskát, translated by Austin Wagner
2025	Artwork	Fractal Series	Nick Wells
2025	Original Audio Fiction	The Dex Legacy Series 3	Emily Inkpen

== See also ==
- Hugo Award – Annual award for science fiction or fantasy
- Locus Award – Speculative fiction literary awards by Locus magazine
- Nebula Award – Literature prize for science fiction and fantasy works from the United States

== External resources ==
- BSFA website
- List of all winning and nominated novels
