= BSFA Award for Best Novel =

British science fiction literary award

- Awarded for: The best science fiction or fantasy novel published in the previous calendar year
- Country: UK
- Presented by: British Science Fiction Association
- First award: 1970
- Currently held by: E. J. Swift (When There Are Wolves Again)
- Website: BSFA Awards

The BSFA Awards are given every year by the British Science Fiction Association. The Best Novel award is open to any novel-length work of science fiction or fantasy that has been published in the UK for the first time in the previous year. Serialised novels are eligible, provided that the publication date of the concluding part is in the previous year. If a novel has been previously published elsewhere, but it hasn't been published in the UK until the previous year, it is eligible.

== Winners and Shortlists ==
The ceremonies are named after the year that the eligible works were published, despite the awards being given out in the next year.

Table key
§	Indicates a declined award or nomination
*	Winners and joint winners

Year	Author(s)	Work	Publisher/Publication	Ref.
1969	John Brunner*	Stand on Zanzibar	Doubleday	
1970	John Brunner*	The Jagged Orbit	Ace	
1971	Brian W. Aldiss*	The Moment of Eclipse	Faber and Faber	
1973	Arthur C. Clarke*	Rendezvous with Rama	Gollancz	
1974	Christopher Priest*	Inverted World	Faber and Faber	
1975	Bob Shaw*	Orbitsville	Gollancz	
1976	Michael G. Coney*	Brontomek!	Gollancz	
1977	Ian Watson*	The Jonah Kit	Gollancz	
1978	Philip K. Dick*	A Scanner Darkly	Doubleday	
1979	J. G. Ballard*	The Unlimited Dream Company	Jonathan Cape	
1979	Rob Swigart	A.K.A.: A Cosmic Fable	Magnum	
1979	Tom Reamy	Blind Voices	Sidgwick & Jackson	
1979	Arthur C. Clarke	The Fountains of Paradise	Gollancz	
1979	Thomas M. Disch	On Wings of Song	Gollancz	
1980	Gregory Benford*	Timescape	Simon & Schuster	
1980	Frederik Pohl	Beyond the Blue Event Horizon	Del Rey	
1980	John Crowley	Engine Summer	Doubleday	
1980	Keith Roberts	Molly Zero	Gollancz	
1980	Michael Bishop	Transfigurations	Gollancz	
1980	Norman Spinrad	A World Between	Pocket	
1981	Gene Wolfe*	The Shadow of the Torturer	Sidgwick & Jackson	
1981	Christopher Priest	The Affirmation	Faber and Faber	
1981	J. G. Ballard	Hello America	Jonathan Cape	
1981	Robert Holdstock	Where Time Winds Blow	Faber and Faber	
1982	Brian W. Aldiss*	Helliconia Spring	Jonathan Cape	
1982	Philip K. Dick	The Divine Invasion	Timescape	
1982	John Crowley	Little, Big	Bantam	
1982	Michael Bishop	No Enemy But Time	Timescape	
1982	Gene Wolfe	The Sword of the Lictor	Timescape	
1983	John Sladek*	Tik-Tok	Gollancz	
1983	Michael G. Coney	Cat Karina	Ace	
1983	Gene Wolfe	The Citadel of the Autarch	Timescape	
1983	Mary Gentle	Golden Witchbreed	Gollancz	
1983	Brian W. Aldiss	Helliconia Summer	Jonathan Cape	
1984	Robert Holdstock*	Mythago Wood	Gollancz	
1984	J. G. Ballard	Empire of the Sun	Gollancz	
1984	Christopher Priest	The Glamour	Jonathan Cape	
1984	William Gibson	Neuromancer	Gollancz	
1984	Angela Carter	Nights at the Circus	Chatto & Windus	
1985	Brian W. Aldiss*	Helliconia Winter	Jonathan Cape	
1985	Tim Powers	The Anubis Gates	Chatto & Windus	
1985	Gene Wolfe	Free Live Free	Gollancz	
1985	Keith Roberts	Kiteworld	Gollancz	
1985	Geoff Ryman	The Warrior Who Carried Life	Allen & Unwin	
1986	Bob Shaw*	The Ragged Astronauts	Gollancz	
1986	Greg Bear	Blood Music	Gollancz	
1986	William Gibson	Count Zero	Gollancz	
1986	Josephine Saxton	Queen of the States	The Women's Press	
1986	Bruce Sterling	Schismatrix	Penguin	
1987	Keith Roberts*	Gráinne	Kerosina	
1988	Robert Holdstock*	Lavondyss	Gollancz	
1988	Iain M. Banks	The Player of Games	Macmillan	
1988	William Gibson	Mona Lisa Overdrive	Gollancz	
1988	Gwyneth Jones	Kairos	Allen & Unwin	
1988	Bob Shaw	The Wooden Spaceships	Gollancz	
1988	Lucius Shepard	Life During Wartime	Bantam	
1989	Terry Pratchett*	Pyramids	Gollancz	
1989	Jonathan Carroll	A Child Across the Sky	Legend	
1989	Geoff Ryman	The Child Garden	Allen & Unwin	
1989	C. J. Cherryh	Cyteen	Warner	
1989	Kim Stanley Robinson	The Gold Coast	Orbit	
1990	Colin Greenland*	Take Back Plenty	Allen & Unwin	
1990	William Gibson & Bruce Sterling	The Difference Engine	Gollancz	
1990	Dan Simmons	Hyperion	Headline	
1990	Mary Gentle	Rats and Gargoyles	Bantam	
1990	Iain M. Banks	Use of Weapons	Orbit	
1991	Dan Simmons*	The Fall of Hyperion	Headline	
1991	Mary Gentle	The Architecture of Desire	Bantam	
1991	Paul J. McAuley	Eternal Light	Gollancz	
1992	Kim Stanley Robinson*	Red Mars	HarperCollins	
1992	Connie Willis	Doomsday Book	Bantam	
1992	Ian McDonald	Hearts, Hands and Voices	Gollancz	
1992	Simon Ings	Hot Head	Grafton	
1992	Lisa Tuttle	Lost Futures	Grafton	
1993	Christopher Evans*	Aztec Century	Gollancz	
1993	Nicola Griffith	Ammonite	Grafton	
1993	Kim Stanley Robinson	Green Mars	HarperCollins	
1993	Colin Greenland	Harm's Way	HarperCollins	
1993	Neal Stephenson	Snow Crash	Roc	
1994	Iain M. Banks*	Feersum Endjinn	Orbit	
1994	Eric Brown	Engineman	Pan	
1994	Ian McDonald	Necroville	Gollancz	
1994	Gwyneth Jones	North Wind	Gollancz	
1994	Greg Egan	Permutation City	Millennium	
1995	Stephen Baxter*	The Time Ships	HarperPrism	
1995	Michael Moorcock	Blood	Unknown	
1995	Ian McDonald	Chaga	Gollancz	
1995	Paul J. McAuley	Fairyland	Gollancz	
1995	Peter F. Hamilton	The Nano Flower	Pan	
1995	Christopher Priest	The Prestige	Simon & Schuster	
1996	Iain M. Banks*	Excession	Orbit	
1996	Kim Stanley Robinson	Blue Mars	HarperVoyager	
1996	Bruce Sterling	Holy Fire	Orion	
1996	Stephen Bury	Interface	Orion	
1996	Gill Alderman	The Memory Palace	HarperVoyager	
1996	Ken MacLeod	The Stone Canal	Legend	
1997	Mary Doria Russell*	The Sparrow	Black Swan	
1997	Tim Powers	Earthquake Weather	Legend	
1997	Michael Swanwick	Jack Faust	Orion	
1997	Jack Deighton	A Son of the Rock	Orbit	
1998	Christopher Priest*	The Extremes	Simon & Schuster	
1998	Ken MacLeod	The Cassini Division	Orbit	
1998	Iain M. Banks	Inversions	Orbit	
1998	Kathleen Ann Goonan	Queen City Jazz	HarperVoyager	
1998	John Meaney	To Hold Infinity	Bantam	
1999	Ken MacLeod*	The Sky Road	Orbit	
1999	Mary Doria Russell	Children of God	Black Swan	
1999	Simon Ings	Headlong	HarperVoyager	
1999	Justina Robson	Silver Screen	Macmillan	
1999	Eugene Byrne	ThigMOO	Earthlight	
2000	Mary Gentle*	Ash: A Secret History	Gollancz	
2000	John Meaney	Paradox	Bantam	
2000	China Miéville	Perdido Street Station	Macmillan	
2000	Jon Courtenay Grimwood	redRobe	Earthlight	
2000	Alastair Reynolds	Revelation Space	Gollancz	
2001	Alastair Reynolds*	Chasm City	Gollancz	
2001	Neil Gaiman	American Gods	Headline	
2001	Gwyneth Jones	Bold as Love	Gollancz	
2001	Geoff Ryman	Lust	Flamingo	
2001	Jon Courtenay Grimwood	Pashazade: The First Arabesk	Earthlight	
2001	Paul McAuley	The Secret of Life	HarperVoyager	
2002	Christopher Priest*	The Separation	Scribner	
2002	Gwyneth Jones	Castles Made of Sand	Gollancz	
2002	Jon Courtenay Grimwood	Effendi: The Second Arabesk	Earthlight	
2002	M. John Harrison	Light	Gollancz	
2002	China Miéville	The Scar	Macmillan	
2002	Kim Stanley Robinson	The Years of Rice and Salt	HarperCollins	
2003	Jon Courtenay Grimwood*	Felaheen: The Third Arabesk	Earthlight	
2003	Alastair Reynolds	Absolution Gap	Gollancz	
2003	Tricia Sullivan	Maul	Orbit	
2003	Gwyneth Jones	Midnight Lamp	Orbit	
2003	Justina Robson	Natural History	Macmillan	
2003	William Gibson	Pattern Recognition	Viking	
2004	Ian McDonald*	River of Gods	Simon & Schuster	
2004	Alastair Reynolds	Century Rain	Gollancz	
2004	Kim Stanley Robinson	Forty Signs of Rain	HarperCollins	
2004	Susanna Clarke	Jonathan Strange & Mr Norrell	Bloomsbury	
2004	Ken MacLeod	Newton's Wake	Orbit	
2004	Jon Courtenay Grimwood	Stamping Butterflies	Gollancz	
2005	Geoff Ryman*	Air	Gollancz	
2005	Jon Courtenay Grimwood	9tail Fox	Gollancz	
2005	Charles Stross	Accelerando	Orbit	
2005	Ken MacLeod	Learning the World	Orbit	
2005	Justina Robson	Living Next Door to the God of Love	Macmillan	
2006	Jon Courtenay Grimwood*	End of the World Blues	Gollancz	
2006	Liz Williams	Darkland	Tor	
2006	Roger Levy	Icarus	Gollancz	
2006	James Morrow	The Last Witchfinder	Weidenfeld & Nicolson	
2006	M. John Harrison	Nova Swing	Gollancz	
2007	Ian McDonald*	Brasyl	Gollancz	
2007	Bryan Talbot	Alice in Sunderland	Jonathan Cape	
2007	Richard Morgan	Black Man	Gollancz	
2007	Ken MacLeod	The Execution Channel	Orbit	
2007	Alastair Reynolds	The Prefect	Gollancz	
2007	Michael Chabon	The Yiddish Policemen's Union	Fourth Estate	
2008	Ken MacLeod*	The Night Sessions	Orbit	
2008	Neal Stephenson	Anathem	William Morrow	
2008	Stephen Baxter	Flood	Gollancz	
2008	Nick Harkaway	The Gone-Away World	Heinemann	
2009	China Miéville*	The City & the City	Macmillan	
2009	Stephen Baxter	Ark	Gollancz	
2009	Ursula K. Le Guin	Lavinia	Gollancz	
2009	Adam Roberts	Yellow Blue Tibia	Gollancz	
2010	Ian McDonald*	The Dervish House	Gollancz	
2010	Tricia Sullivan	Lightborn	Orbit	
2010	Ken MacLeod	The Restoration Game	Orbit	
2010	Paolo Bacigalupi	The Windup Girl	Orbit	
2010	Lauren Beukes	Zoo City	Angry Robot	
2011	Christopher Priest*	The Islanders	Gollancz	
2011	Adam Roberts	By Light Alone	Gollancz	
2011	Kim Lakin-Smith	Cyber Circus	NewCon	
2011	China Miéville	Embassytown	Macmillan	
2011	Lavie Tidhar	Osama	PS	
2012	Adam Roberts*	Jack Glass	Gollancz	
2012	Kim Stanley Robinson	2312	Orbit	
2012	Chris Beckett	Dark Eden	Corvus	
2012	M. John Harrison	Empty Space	Gollancz	
2012	Ken MacLeod	Intrusion	Orbit	
2013	Ann Leckie*	Ancillary Justice	Orbit	
2013	Gareth L. Powell*	Ack-Ack Macaque	Solaris	
2013	Christopher Priest	The Adjacent	Gollancz	
2013	Paul McAuley	Evening's Empires	Gollancz	
2013	Kameron Hurley	God's War	Del Rey	
2014	Ann Leckie*	Ancillary Sword	Orbit	
2014	Frances Hardinge	Cuckoo Song	Macmillan	
2014	Dave Hutchinson	Europe in Autumn	Solaris	
2014	Claire North	The First Fifteen Lives of Harry August	Orbit	
2014	Nnedi Okorafor	Lagoon	Hodder & Stoughton	
2014	Neil Williamson	The Moon King	NewCon	
2014	Nina Allan	The Race	NewCon	
2014	Simon Ings	Wolves	Gollancz	
2015	Aliette de Bodard*	The House of Shattered Wings	Gollancz	
2015	Dave Hutchinson	Europe at Midnight	Solaris	
2015	Justina Robson	Glorious Angels	Gollancz	
2015	Ian McDonald	Luna: New Moon	Gollancz	
2015	Chris Beckett	Mother of Eden	Corvus	
2016	Dave Hutchinson*	Europe in Winter	Solaris	
2016	Nick Wood	Azanian Bridges	NewCon	
2016	Becky Chambers	A Closed and Common Orbit	Hodder & Stoughton	
2016	Chris Beckett	Daughter of Eden	Corvus	
2016	Tricia Sullivan	Occupy Me	Gollancz	
2017	Nina Allan*	The Rift	Titan	
2017	Anne Charnock	Dreams Before the Start of Time	47North	
2017	Mohsin Hamid	Exit West	Hamish Hamilton	
2017	Ann Leckie	Provenance	Orbit	
2018	Gareth L. Powell*	Embers of War	Titan	
2018	Dave Hutchinson	Europe at Dawn	Solaris	
2018	Yoon Ha Lee	Revenant Gun	Solaris	
2018	Emma Newman	Before Mars	Ace	
2018	Tade Thompson	Rosewater	Orbit	
2019	Adrian Tchaikovsky*	Children of Ruin	Tor	
2019	Juliet E. McKenna	The Green Man’s Foe	Wizard's Tower Press	
2019	Emma Newman	Atlas Alone	Gollancz	
2019	Gareth L. Powell	Fleet of Knives	Titan	
2019	Tade Thompson	The Rosewater Insurrection	Orbit	
2020	N. K. Jemisin*	The City We Became	Orbit	
2020	Tiffani Angus	Threading the Labyrinth	Unsung Stories	
2020	Susanna Clarke	Piranesi	Bloomsbury	
2020	M. John Harrison	The Sunken Land Begins to Rise Again	Gollancz	
2020	Gareth L. Powell	Light of Impossible Stars	Titan	
2020	Kim Stanley Robinson	The Ministry for the Future	Orbit	
2020	Nikhil Singh	Club Ded	Luna	
2020	Adrian Tchaikovsky	The Doors of Eden	Tor	
2020	Liz Williams	Comet Weather	NewCon	
2020	Nick Wood	Water Must Fall	NewCon	
2021	Adrian Tchaikovsky*	Shards of Earth	Tor	
2021	Liz Williams	Blackthorn Winter	NewCon	
2021	Arkady Martine	A Desolation Called Peace	Tor	
2021	Aliya Whiteley	Skyward Inn	Solaris	
2021	Adam Roberts	Purgatory Mount	Gollancz	
2021	Juliet E. McKenna	The Green Man's Challenge	Wizard's Tower Press	
2022	Adrian Tchaikovsky*	City of Last Chances	Head of Zeus	
2022	Adam Roberts	The This	Gollancz	
2022	Gareth L. Powell	Stars and Bones	Titan	
2022	Aliette de Bodard	The Red Scholar's Wake	Gollancz	
2022	E.J. Swift	The Coral Bones	Unsung Stories	
2023	Juliet E. McKenna*	The Green Man’s Quarry	Wizard's Tower Press	
2023	Christopher Priest	Airside	Gollancz	
2023	Gareth L. Powell	Descendant Machine	Titan	
2023	Geoff Ryman	HIM	Angry Robot	
2023	Wole Talabi	Shigidi and the Brass Head of Obalufon	Gollancz	
2024	Aliya Whiteley*	Three Eight One	Solaris Books	
2024	Oliver K. Langmead	Calypso	Titan	
2024	Fiona Moore	Rabbit in the Moon	Epic Publishing	
2024	Adrian Tchaikovsky_{§} (Note: Alien Clay was removed from the ballot at the request of the author.)	Alien Clay	Orbit Books	
2025	E. J. Swift*	When There Are Wolves Again	Arcadia	
2025	Lorraine Wilson	The Salt Oracle	Solaris Books	
2025	Kirk Weddell	Edge of Oblivion	Troubador Publishing	
2025	Stewart Hotston	Project Hanuman	Angry Robot	
2025	Nina Allan	A Granite Silence	Riverrun	
