= Iron fish =

Iron fish may refer to:

- Lucky iron fish, a dietary iron supplement
- Code word for "submarine" used by the Navajo code talkers
- The Iron Fish, one of the Beano comic strips
- "The Iron Fish", a submersible used by Jimmy Grey in The League of Extraordinary Gentlemen comic book series
- City of the Iron Fish, a novel by Simon Ings
