= Cosmonaut Keep =

2000 novel by Ken MacLeod

- First ed. cover
- Author: Ken MacLeod
- Cover artist: Lee Gibbons
- Language: English
- Series: Engines of Light Trilogy
- Genre: Science fiction
- Publisher: Orbit Books
- Publication date: 2003 (first edition)
- Publication place: United Kingdom
- Media type: Print
- Pages: 308 p.
- ISBN: 1857239865
- OCLC: 53096139
- Followed by: Dark Light

Cosmonaut Keep is a science fiction novel by Scottish writer Ken MacLeod, published in 2000. It is the first book in the Engines of Light Trilogy, a 2001 nominee for the Arthur C. Clarke Award, and a 2002 Hugo Award Nominee for best novel.

== Reception ==
Publishers Weekly had mostly praise for the novel saying:

MacLeod handles the strands of the plot deftly, weaving one beautifully realized world with the other and highlighting the parallels between the two. Rarely does a book demand so much of the reader and then deliver. Densely written with a remarkable depth of cultural texture, though occasionally confusing in its politics (which includes socialists, "Webblies" and libertarian capitalists), MacLeod's story is spoiled only by the false notes of two parallel love interests.

== Reference in other work ==
In Cosmonaut Keep, MacLeod makes fleeting reference to a future programmers' union called the "Information Workers of the World Wide Web", or the Webblies, a reference to the Industrial Workers of the World, who are nicknamed the Wobblies. The idea of the Webblies formed a central part of a later novel For the Win by Cory Doctorow, where it is given much greater prominence. MacLeod is acknowledged by Doctorow as coining the terms.
