= Keeping It Real (novel) =

2006 novel by Justina Robson

- First edition
- Author: Justina Robson
- Cover artist: Larry Rostant
- Language: English
- Series: Quantum Gravity
- Genre: Science fiction
- Publisher: Gollancz
- Publication date: May 2006
- Publication place: United Kingdom
- Media type: Print (Hardcover & Paperback)
- ISBN: 978-0-575-07907-6
- Followed by: Selling Out

Keeping It Real is a science fiction novel by British writer Justina Robson, the first in the Quantum Gravity series.

== Synopsis ==
Agent Lila Black is a cyborg operative for Earth Security, six years after the quantum bomb fractured reality and allowed elves, fairies, demons and other magical creatures access to the Earth. Agent Black is assigned to protect the first Elven rock star, Zal, whose decision to live amongst humans and 'go native' has been met with considerable animosity amongst his own people. Black has to protect Zal from death or capture whilst uncovering secrets that threaten the relationships between the realms.

== Reception ==
Publishers Weekly called it "entertaining", with "deft prose". GamesRadar described it as "serious fun", emphasizing its "breakneck pace, oneliners and action set-pieces", but also its "deeper themes surrounding identity, sexual politics and the clash of cultures".

Infinity Plus praised its "well-written characters, witty dialogue and, in this case, tons of popcultural references", particularly commending Robson for having addressed "the sheer weight of extensive prosthetics and how it must feel when the servos quit working", but faulted the extent to which "the fast-paced narrative gets muddled by a lot of elven intrigue, which is difficult to follow and which didn't engage [the reviewer's] interest enough to really try."

At Strange Horizons, Colin Harvey found it to be "the most densely plotted fantasy novel" since Roger Zelazny's The Chronicles of Amber, lauding "Robson’s efforts to give magic logical underpinnings", with Lila being a "credible and sympathetic überspy" despite having "a huge backstory for a twenty-one-year-old, perhaps too much to be entirely credible".
