= Dissent (disambiguation) =

Dissent is an opinion, philosophy or sentiment of non-agreement or opposition to a prevailing idea or policy enforced under the authority of a government, political party or other entity or individual.

Dissent may also refer to:

- Dissent (American magazine), an American political magazine
- Dissent (Australian magazine), an Australian political magazine
- Dissent (EP), a 2004 EP by Misery Index
- Dissent!, an advocacy group
- Dissent, a 1997 album by Linoleum; also a song from the album

== See also ==
- Dissension (disambiguation)
- Dissident (disambiguation)
