= Ken MacLeod =

Scottish science fiction writer (born 1954)

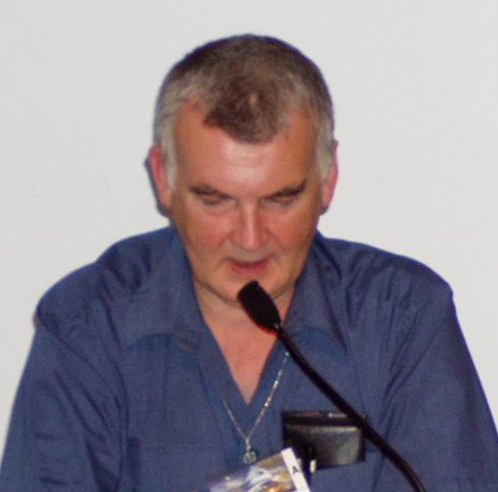
- Addressing the 63rd World Science Fiction Convention, Glasgow, August 2005
- Born: Kenneth Macrae MacLeod; 2 August 1954 (age 72); Stornoway, Ross and Cromarty, Scotland
- Education: University of Glasgow (BS)
- Occupation: Writer
- Children: 2
- Writing career
- Language: English
- Genre: Science fiction
- Notable awards: BSFA Award, Prometheus Award
- Website: kenmacleod.blogspot.com

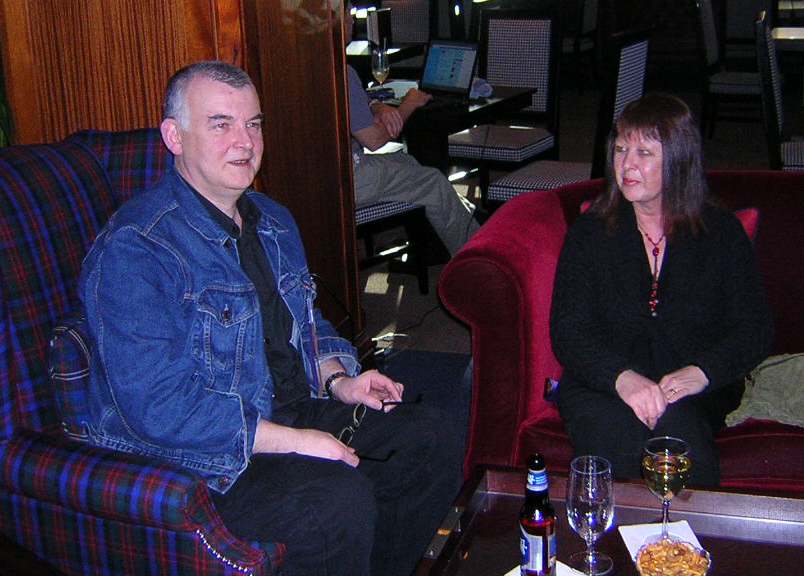
Ken and Carol MacLeod at Boskone 43, 2006

Kenneth Macrae MacLeod (born 2 August 1954) is a Scottish science fiction writer. His novels The Sky Road and The Night Sessions won the BSFA Award. MacLeod's novels have been nominated for the Arthur C. Clarke, Hugo, Nebula, Locus, and Campbell Memorial awards for best novel on multiple occasions. In 2024 MacLeod was one of the Guests of Honour at the 82nd World Science Fiction Convention in Glasgow.

A techno-utopianist, MacLeod makes frequent use of libertarian socialist themes in his work; he is a three-time winner of the libertarian Prometheus Award. He sits on the advisory board of the Edinburgh Science Festival.

== Biography ==
MacLeod was born in Stornoway, Scotland, in 1954. He graduated from University of Glasgow with a degree in zoology in 1976, and he worked as a computer programmer and wrote a master's thesis on biomechanics. He was a Trotskyist activist during the 1970s and early 1980s. MacLeod is opposed to Scottish independence.

== Personal life ==
Married with two children, MacLeod lived in South Queensferry near Edinburgh, before moving to Gourock (on the Firth of Clyde) in June 2017. His wife died in August 2024.

== Writing ==
MacLeod belongs to a group of British science fiction writers who specialise in hard science fiction and space opera. His contemporaries include Neal Asher, Stephen Baxter, Iain M. Banks, Peter F. Hamilton, Paul J. McAuley, Alastair Reynolds, Adam Roberts, Charles Stross, Richard K. Morgan, and Liz Williams.

MacLeod's science fiction novels often explore socialist, communist, and anarchist political ideas, especially Trotskyism and anarcho-capitalism (or extreme economic libertarianism). Technical themes encompass singularities, divergent human cultural evolution, and post-human cyborg-resurrection. MacLeod's general outlook can be best described as techno-utopian socialist, though unlike a majority of techno-utopians, he has expressed great scepticism over the possibility and especially the desirability of strong AI.

MacLeod is known for frequent in-jokes and puns on the intersection between socialist ideologies and computer programming, as well as other fields. For example, his chapter titles such as "Trusted Third Parties" or "Revolutionary Platform" usually have double (or multiple) meanings. A fictional future programmers union is called "Information Workers of the World Wide Web", or the Webblies, a reference to the real Industrial Workers of the World union, who are nicknamed the Wobblies. The Webblies concept formed a central part of the novel For the Win by Cory Doctorow, and MacLeod is acknowledged as coining the term. Doctorow and Charles Stross also used one of MacLeod's references to the singularity—as "the rapture for nerds"—as the title for their collaborative novel Rapture of the Nerds (although MacLeod denies coining the phrase). There are also many references to or puns on zoology and palaeontology. For example, in the novel The Stone Canal, the title of the book and many of its described places are named after anatomical features of marine invertebrates such as starfish.

== Bibliography ==
=== Novels ===
- Newton's Wake: A Space Opera (2004; US paperback edition ISBN 0-7653-4422-X) – BSFA nominee, 2004; Campbell Award nominee, 2005
- Learning the World: A Novel of First Contact (2005; UK hardback edition ISBN 1-84149-343-0) Prometheus Award winner 2006; Hugo, Locus SF, Campbell and Clarke Awards nominee, 2006; BSFA nominee, 2005
- The Execution Channel (2007; UK hardback edition ISBN 978-1841493480) – BSFA Award nominee, 2007; Campbell, and Clarke Awards nominee, 2008
- The Night Sessions (2008; UK hardback edition ISBN 978-1841496511) – Winner Best Novel 2008 BSFA
- The Restoration Game (2010). According to the author, "In The Restoration Game I revisited the fall of the Soviet Union, with a narrator who is at first a piece in a game played by others, and works her way up to becoming to some extent a player, but – as we see when we pull back at the end – is still part of a larger game."
- Intrusion (2012): "an Orwellian surveillance society installs sensors on pregnant women to prevent smoking or drinking; and these women also have to take a eugenic 'fix' to eliminate genetic anomalies."
- Descent (2014): "My genre model for Descent was bloke-lit – that's basically first-person, self-serving, rueful confessional by a youngish man looking back on youthful stupidities... ... Descent is about flying saucers, hidden races, and Antonio Gramsci's concept of passive revolution, all set in a tale of Scottish middle class family life in and after the Great Depression of the 21st Century. Almost mainstream fiction, really."

Fall Revolution series

1. The Star Fraction (1995; US paperback ISBN 0-7653-0156-3) – Prometheus Award winner, 1996; Clarke Award nominee, 1996
2. The Stone Canal (1996; US paperback ISBN 0-8125-6864-8) – Prometheus Award winner, 1998; BSFA nominee, 1996
3. The Cassini Division (1998; US paperback ISBN 0-312-87044-2) – BSFA nominee, 1998; Clarke, and Nebula Awards nominee, 1999
4. The Sky Road (1999; US paperback ISBN 0-8125-7759-0) BSFA Award winner, 1999; Hugo Award nominee, 2001 – represents an 'alternate future' to the second two books, as its events diverge sharply due to a choice made differently by one of the protagonists in the middle of The Stone Canal (Note: "The Falling Rate of Profit, Red Hordes and Green Slime: What the Fall Revolution Books Are About" – Nova Express, Volume 6, Spring/Summer 2001, pp 19–21)

This series is also available in two volumes:

1. Fractions: The First Half of the Fall Revolution (2009; US paperback ISBN 0-7653-2068-1)
2. Divisions: The Second Half of the Fall Revolution (2009; US paperback ISBN 0-7653-2119-X)

Engines of Light trilogy

1. Cosmonaut Keep (2000; US paperback ISBN 0-7653-4073-9) – Clarke Award nominee, 2001; Hugo Award nominee, 2002 Begins the series with a first contact story in a speculative mid-21st century where a resurgently socialist USSR (incorporating the European Union) is once again in opposition with the capitalist United States, then diverges into a story told on the other side of the galaxy of Earth-descended colonists trying to establish trade and relations within an interstellar empire of several species who travel from world to world at the speed of light.
2. Dark Light (2001; US paperback ISBN 0-7653-4496-3) – Campbell Award nominee, 2002
3. Engine City (2002; US paperback ISBN 0-7653-4421-1)

The Corporation Wars

1. Dissidence (2016)
2. Insurgence (2016)
3. Emergence (2017)

Lightspeed Trilogy

1. Beyond the Hallowed Sky (2021; Orbit ISBN 9780356514796)
2. Beyond the Reach of Earth (2023; Orbit ISBN 9780356514819)
3. Beyond the Light Horizon (2024; Orbit ISBN 9780356514826)

=== Short fiction ===
Collections

- Poems & Polemics (2001; Rune Press: Minneapolis, MN) Chapbook of non-fiction and poetry.
- Giant lizards from another star (2006; US trade hardcover ISBN 1-886778-62-0) Collected fiction and nonfiction.
- A Jura for Julia. NewCon Press. 2024.

Chapbooks

- Cydonia. The Web. Dolphin Paperbacks. 1998. (Note: Collected in Giant lizards from another star.)
- The human front. PS Publishing. 2001. (Note: Winner of the 2001 Short Form Sidewise Award for Alternate History (announced 2002).)
- The highway men. Sandstone Press. 2006.

Stories (Note: Short stories unless otherwise noted.)

Title	Year	First published	Reprinted/collected	Notes
Lighting out	2007	disLocations	MacLeod, Ken (2024). "Lighting out". A Jura for Julia. NewCon Press. pp. 37–61.	
Nineteen Eighty-Nine	2021	ParSec	MacLeod, Ken (2024). "Nineteen Eighty-Nine". A Jura for Julia. NewCon Press. pp. 6–36.	
Sidewinders	2010	The mammoth book of alternate histories	MacLeod, Ken (2024). "Sidewinders". A Jura for Julia. NewCon Press. pp. 71–86.	
The surface of last scattering	2011	TRSF : the best new science fiction	MacLeod, Ken (2024). "The surface of last scattering". A Jura for Julia. NewCon Press. pp. 87–98.	
The Vorkuta Event	2011	The new and perfect man (Postscripts #24/25)	MacLeod, Ken (2024). "The Vorkuta Event". A Jura for Julia. NewCon Press. pp. 99–124.	Novelette
Wilson at Woking	2008	Celebration	MacLeod, Ken (2024). "Wilson at Woking". A Jura for Julia. NewCon Press. pp. 63–70.	

- "Who's Afraid of Wolf 359?" (The New Space Opera, 2007; nominated for Hugo Award for Best Short Story)
- "Ms Found on a Hard Drive" (Glorifying Terrorism, 2007)
- "Earth Hour" (2011)
- "'The Entire Immense Superstructure': An Installation" (Reach for Infinity, 2014)

=== Critical studies and reviews of MacLeod's work ===
- The true knowledge of Ken MacLeod, edited by Andrew M. Butler and Farah Mendlesohn (Science Fiction Foundation).

In addition to critical essays, it contains material by MacLeod himself, including his introduction to the German edition of Iain M. Banks' novel Consider Phlebas.

———————

Bibliography notes

Preceded by James White	ESFS award for Best Author; 2000	Succeeded by Valerio Evangelisti
