= Highwayman (disambiguation) =

A highwayman was a criminal who robbed travelers on the road.

Highwayman, highwaymen, or highway men may also refer to:

== People ==
- The Highwaymen (country supergroup), a 1985–1995 country music supergroup
- The Highwaymen (folk band), a 1960s collegiate folk band
- The Highwaymen (landscape artists), a group of 20th-century African-American landscape painters from Florida

== Arts, entertainment, and media ==
=== Films ===
- Highwaymen (film), a 2004 film
- The Highwayman (1951 film), a 1951 film
- The Highwaymen (film), a 2019 film

=== Literature ===
- The Highway Men (MacLeod novel), a 2006 novella by Ken MacLeod
- "The Highwayman" (poem), a 1906 poem by Alfred Noyes
- "The Highwayman", a short story by Lord Dunsany later made into a short film
- The Highwayman, a 1962 novel by Sylvia Thorpe
- The Highwayman, a 1955 novel by Noel Gerson
- The Highwayman, a 1955 novel by Frank Gruber (writer)
- The Highwayman, a 1996 novel by Madeline Harper
- The Highwayman (novel), a 2004 novel by R. A. Salvatore

==== Comics ====
- The Highwayman, a comic book adaptation of Salvatore's novel by Matthew Hansen
- The Highwaymen, a limited series comic book by Lee Garbett

=== Music ===
==== Albums ====
- Highwayman (The Highwaymen album) (aka Highwayman 1), 1985, from the country music supergroup; including a cover of the Jimmy Webb song
- Highwayman 2 (The Highwaymen album), 1990; from the country music supergroup
- Highwayman (Glen Campbell album), including a cover of the Jimmy Webb song
- The Highwayman, 1960, from the folk music group The Highwaymen

==== Songs ====
- "Highway Man", a song by Hoffmaestro & Chraa
- "Highwayman" (song), a song by Jimmy Webb
- "Highwayman", a song by Brotherhood of Man from Images
- The Highwayman, an operetta by Reginald De Koven and Harry B. Smith
- "The Highwayman", a song by Loreena McKennitt from The Book of Secrets, based on the Noyes poem (see above)
- "The Highwayman", a song by Phil Ochs from I Ain't Marching Anymore, based on the Noyes poem
- "The Highwayman", a song by Stevie Nicks from Bella Donna
- "The Highwayman", a song by The White Buffalo from The Highwayman Single

=== Other uses in arts, entertainment, and media ===
- Highwayman, a vehicle in the video game Fallout 2
- The Highwayman (musical), an Australian musical comedy by Edmond Samuels
- The Highwayman (TV series), a short-lived (1987–1988) American action-adventure series starring Sam J. Jones

== Other uses ==
- B5470 road, in Cheshire, England; referred to as The Highwayman after a roadside pub
- Highwaymen Motorcycle Club, an American motorcycle club
- Highwayman's hitch, a type of quick-release knot
