= Headlong =

Headlong may refer to:

- Headlong (theatre company), a British theatre company
- Headlong (Williams novel), a 1980 novel by Emlyn Williams
- Headlong (Frayn novel), a 1999 novel by Michael Frayn
- Headlong (Ings novel), a 1999 novel by Simon Ings
- "Headlong" (song), a song by Queen from Innuendo
- "Headlong", a song by IQ from The Wake
