= Helen Hart =

Helen Hart may refer to:

- Helen Hart (author), writer of children's books
- Helen Hart (plant pathologist) (1900–1971), American plant pathologist
- Helen Hart (suffragist) (1839–1908), British born Australian suffragist, lecturer, poet, and preacher
- Helen Hart (wrestling) (1924–2001), née Smith, matriarch of the Hart wrestling family
- Helen Hart, née Cooper, a character from the soap opera Family Affairs
