= Colin Harvey (disambiguation) =

Colin Harvey (born 1944) is an English former professional footballer, coach and manager.

Colin Harvey may refer to:

- Colin Harvey (writer) (1960–2011), British science fiction writer, editor and reviewer
- Timothy Colin Harvey Luckhurst (born 1963), British journalist and academic
