= Jeapes =

Jeapes is a surname. Notable people with the surname include:

- Ben Jeapes (born 1965), British science fiction writer
- Tony Jeapes (born 1935), British soldier
