= Wizard's Tower Press =

Independent small press

- Status: Current
- Founded: 2010
- Founder: Cheryl Morgan
- Country of origin: United Kingdom
- Publication types: Salon Futura
- Fiction genres: Science fiction, Speculative fiction, Fantasy
- Official website: wizardstowerpress.com

Wizard's Tower Press is an independent small press, specializing in the publication of new and minority authors and the republication of out of print works of science fiction and fantasy fiction with the aim of improving access for writers to the e-book market. It was founded in 2010 by Cheryl Morgan. The press produces the literary review magazine Salon Futura.

The company has published work by Joanne Hall, Roz Clarke, Colin Harvey, Ben Jeapes, Andy Bigwood, Juliet E. McKenna and Lyda Morehouse.
