= Dissident (disambiguation) =

A dissident is a person who actively challenges an established political or religious system, doctrine, belief, policy, or institution.

Dissident or Dissidence may also refer to:

- Dissident (album), a 1991 album by Deadline
- "Dissident" (song), a 1994 song by Pearl Jam
- The Dissident, a 2020 American film directed by Bryan Fogel
- The Dissidents, a 2017 Estonian film directed by Jaak Kilmi
- Dissidence (novel), a 2016 novel by Ken MacLeod
- "The Dissident", an episode of the television series V

== See also ==
- Dissent (disambiguation)
