= Alien space bats =

Implausible plot device in fiction

"Alien space bats" ("ASBs") is a neologism for plot devices used in alternate history to mean an implausible point of divergence.

== Definition ==
"Alien space bats" was originally used as a sarcastic attack on poorly written alternate histories seen as being implausible. The attacks are usually phrased as the need for "alien space bats" or by saying that the alternate history has gone into "ASB territory". The term eventually evolved into a reference to deus ex machina to create an impossible point of divergence. Examples include changes to the physical laws of nature, time travel, and advanced aliens interfering in human affairs. An example of the last change is Harry Turtledove's Worldwar series.

== History ==
The term "alien space bats" was coined and popularized in the Usenet group "soc.history.what-if" in 1998. Alison Brooks (1959–2002), credited as the creator of the term, used it to debunk the possibility of a successful Operation Sea Lion by saying that Nazi Germany could successfully invade the United Kingdom across the English Channel only if they had the help of alien space bats. Brooks regretted the use of the ASBs as a supernatural agency and preferred to restrict them to rhetoric.

S. M. Stirling credited Brooks with creating the term in the acknowledgments section of Dies the Fire in which he changed the laws of physics and also used the plot device to send Nantucket back in time in Island in the Sea of Time. One character throughout Dies the Fire and its sequels believes the change to the laws of nature to have been done by an advanced alien race because the changes were finely tailored and refers to the race as alien space bats. In a review of Dies the Fire, Dale Cozort addressed the perceived implausibility of the novel by saying, "Just say to yourself, 'The elder gods or alien space bats took our toys away and that’s all there is to it.'" Paul Di Filippo often uses the term in reviewing the series. The term also appeared in John Birmingham's 2008 novel Without Warning.

== In popular culture ==
- In Ken MacLeod's Learning the World, alien space bats actually appear as characters in the novel as an in-joke.
- The gaming magazine Pyramid published an article describing how someone could play as an alien space bat in a role-playing game.
- In Failbetter Games' browser game Fallen London, Victorian-era London is stolen by alien bats from space, though the creators said that this was a coincidence.

== See also ==
- Assiti Shards series
- Jonbar hinge
