= Engine City =

Engine City may refer to:

- Engine City (comics), a fictional city in DC Comics
- Engine City (novel), a 2002 novel by Ken MacLeod
