= Europe in Winter =

2016 novel by Dave Hutchinson

- Cover of the first edition, published by Solaris.
- Author: Dave Hutchinson
- Cover artist: Clint Langley
- Language: English
- Series: The Fractured Europe
- Genre: Science fiction thriller
- Publisher: Solaris Books
- Publication date: Nov 03, 2016
- Publication place: United Kingdom
- Pages: 295
- ISBN: 978-1-78108-463-2
- Preceded by: Europe at Midnight (2015)
- Followed by: Europe at Dawn (2018)

Europe in Winter is a 2016 science fiction novel by English writer Dave Hutchinson. It is the third novel in The Fractured Europe series. In 2017 Europe in Winter won the BSFA Award for Best Novel.
