= Dissension =

Dissension may refer to:

- An expression of dissent
- Dissension (Magic: The Gathering), an expansion set of the collectible card game

== See also ==
- Dissent (disambiguation)
