= The Human Front =

Novella by Ken MacLeod

- Cover of the 2013 PM Press edition
- Author: Ken MacLeod
- Language: English
- Publication date: 2001

The Human Front is a 2001 science fiction/alternate-history novella by Ken MacLeod. It was reissued with added content (an afterword and an additional essay by MacLeod, along with an interview) by PM Press in 2013.

The novel takes place in an alternate-history 1960s in which the Cold War has turned hot. After World War II the US conquered the Soviet Union, leaving China as the sole socialist power. However, by the 1960s Communist insurgents (including the main character) are fighting guerrilla wars in the UK and Western Europe. Flying saucers (fighting on the American side) add a science fictional element.

MacLeod explains in the afterword that real-world Western Maoism was one inspiration for this premise: "The world that Matheson sees is a distorted reflection of the world that his equivalents in our world saw in imagination: one in which the Soviet Union no longer existed as a socialist state, and in which every struggle was part of the apocalyptic confrontation of U.S. imperialism and its allies versus the revolutionary peoples rallied behind the Chinese banner."
