= Sisters of the Sword =

Sisters of the Sword is a historical fiction series written by Helen Hart under the pseudonym Maya Snow. It is made up of four books, the first of which, Sisters of the Sword 1: The Warrior’s Path, was published in June 2008. The other three books in the series, Sisters of the Sword 2: Blade’s Edge (also released as Chasing the Secret), Sisters of the Sword 3: Walking Through Fire (also released as Journey Through Fire), and the fourth installment, Crushing the Stone were published in 2009, June 2009, and June 2012 respectively.

Sisters of the Sword tells the tale of two sisters in Japan during the feudal era who are from an aristocratic family, namely, the daughters of the local "jitō" or lord. Their world is ripped apart when treachery strikes and they must flee for their lives. They disguise themselves as boys and enter a dojo as servants until the time they can exact their revenge.

Kimi is the narrator and main character of the story. She tells her story of her escape with her sister, Hana, and how they come to realize how hard commoner life is.

== Plot ==
Kimi's uncle, Hidehira, comes over for what seems to be a normal visit. It appears as if Kimi's father was leaving and her uncle was taking his place as jitō. As Kimi and Hana watch the sacred ceremony in secrecy, they witness their uncle plunge a knife into their father and then proceed to do away with their older brothers. After witnessing the struggle, they flee and hide in a family shrine. There they find a note from their mother saying that she and Moriyasu, the youngest brother had escaped and that they would some day meet when Moriyasu was old enough to take their house back from Hidehira. This was all in the disguise of a poem.

Kimi and Hana make a plan to disguise themselves as boys and make their way to a prestigious dojo that had taught all of the men in their family. They are not allowed in at first and are confronted by their cousin, the son of Hidehira, Ken-ichi. Luckily he does not recognize the girls and simply looks down upon them as two poor farm boys. It appears he is not even aware of his father's doings. He challenges Kimi to a sword fight after an accidental clash of swords (a sign of disrespect) and, though she loses, her potential catches the attention of the master of the dojo, Master Goku. He lets the girls in as servants and allows them to attend classes when they are not working.

During their time there they begin to realize their cousin's ignorance and ill behavior. Along the way; they befriend a boy named Tatsuya whom they aid through the book. Slowly their skill increases, and to the point Kimi can knock down a tree. During this time; Tatsuya figures out they are the daughters of the deceased jitō.

As time goes by, they realize that Goku has known from the start who they were.

In time, there is a tournament held at the school that takes place every year in which anyone, in or outside of the school, may compete. Kimi and Hana decide to participate in a way to get revenge and to challenge her uncle. But Tatsuya in the process takes Hana out of the tournament. Kimi blows through the tournament; making her way into the top six students participating. During a competition, Ken-ichi injures Tatsuya on purpose as a trick. Then his father disowns him and leaves. Ken-ichi then challenges Master Goku in anger and poisons him before hand. Then he kills Goku and leaves after Kimi defeats him in combat. The book then ends with Kimi and Hana finding a note from their mother.

== Blurb ==
Kimi and Hana are daughters of the jitō, a powerful samurai lord, but their privileged lives are shattered when their father is murdered. Hunted by his killer, it is up to the sisters to salvage what is left of their broken family-and avenge their father's death.

The story continues in the second book, Sisters of the Sword 2: Chasing the Secret.
