= Gold farming =

Practice of professional video game players

Gold farming is the practice of playing a massively multiplayer online game (MMO) to acquire in-game currency, later selling it for real-world money.

Gold farming is distinct from other practices in online multiplayer games, such as power leveling, as gold farming refers specifically to harvesting in-game currency, not rank or experience points. The actual labor mechanics of these practices may be similar, and those who hold employment as gold farmers may also work as power levelers.

While most game operators ban the practice of selling in-game currency for real-world cash, gold farming is lucrative because it takes advantage of economic inequality and the fact much time is needed to earn in-game currency. Rich players from developed countries, wishing to save many hours of playing time, are willing to pay substantial sums to gold farmers from developing countries. Gold farming has also been linked to credit card fraud, with game accounts used for gold farming being paid for with stolen credit cards.

The term has also been used to describe the wait times and chore-like activities players may perform in some freemium mobile phone games, allowing them to play without paying fees.

== History ==
What began as a cottage industry in the late 1990s became increasingly more commercialized in the 2000s with the growing popularity of massively multiplayer online games.

While in the past players used eBay and PayPal to sell each other items and gold from games like Ultima Online and Lineage, contemporary, commercialized gold farming may have its origins in South Korea. 2001 reports describe Korean cybercafes being converted into gold farming operations to serve domestic demand. This model, with full-time gold farmers working long hours in cybercafes, was outsourced to China and initially served demand from Korean players. Gold farming in China was experiencing swift growth c. 2004. Cheap labor from inland provinces had washed into more cosmopolitan cities, and these real-life farmers were promptly pressed into service farming gold. In 2011, The Guardian reported that prisoners in some Chinese re-education camps were forced to engage in gold farming for the benefit of prison authorities.

Gold farming has also been linked to credit card fraud. According to the developers of World of Warcraft and Runescape, most gold-farming and botting accounts in those games were paid for using stolen credit card numbers. Dealing with these fraudulent accounts incurs costs for the game companies not only in terms of employee time, but also monetarily in the form of chargeback fees from credit card companies. In addition, this large-scale fraud can risk a developer's transactions being refused by credit card companies and banks, posing an existential risk to game studios.

Academic studies of gold farming have revealed that the social networks of gold farmers are similar to those of drug dealers.

Similar to gold farming, people may be hired to level up in-game avatars by harvesting experience points. The term elo boosting may refer to a similar activity in games that feature the Elo rating system or some other competitive ladder system.

== Figures ==
While reliable figures for gold farming are hard to come by, there are some estimates of the market for in-game currency.

In 2005, The New York Times estimated that there were over 100,000 full-time gold farmers in China alone, and by 2009, the number had increased to one million. And in 2006–2007, the market for such virtual goods was thought to amount to somewhere between US$300 million and US$900 million.

Another estimate, drawn from 2005/2006 data, valued the market at not less than US$200 million per year and suggested that over 150,000 people were employed as gold farmers with average monthly earnings of US$145. This same report estimated that 80-85% of all gold farmers were from China, a fact which has led to prejudice towards Chinese players. 2008 figures from China valued the Chinese trade in virtual currency at over several billion yuan, nearly US$300 million.

== Rules and enforcement ==
Many game developers expressly ban gold farming in their game's EULA or terms of service. In order to combat this, game developers such as Blizzard and ArenaNet are attempting to discourage third-party gold farming by implementing official real-money transaction systems within their games. For example, in 2015, Blizzard implemented in-game items and tokens that cost players real money to purchase. These can then be auctioned off to other players for in-game currencies.

== Secondary effects on in-game economy ==
Gold farming and power leveling can affect a game's economy by causing inflation. They may degrade the game experience for users as was noted in a legal case against IGE. It is often a source of annoyance for players who can find themselves being "spammed" by sellers via the game's messaging system.

These ill effects can occur whether or not such practices are sanctioned by the game operator. Citing such concerns, Activision Blizzard shut down their real-money transaction system for Diablo III in 2014.

During the crisis in Venezuela, Venezuelans became gold-farmers and could be seen playing online video games such as RuneScape to sell in-game currency or characters for real currency. In many cases, these gamers made more money than salaried workers in Venezuela even though they were earning just a few dollars per day. So many Venezuelans began this practice that it increased inflation with multiple game currencies.

== Law, regulation and taxation ==
Some governments, perhaps recognizing that current regulatory systems may be ill-suited to address activities such as gold farming, have made statements concerning the sale of virtual goods.

=== Australia ===
In 2006, a spokesperson for the Australian Government stated normal earned income rules also apply to income from the sale of virtual goods.

=== China ===
Gold farming in China is more pervasive than in any other country, as 80% of all gold farmers are in mainland China as of 2011, with a total of 100,000 full-time gold farmers in the country as of 2005. Gold farming in China is done in Internet cafes, abandoned warehouses, small offices, private homes and even "re-education through labor" camps. When organized as an actual informal business, they are known as "gaming workshops" (Simplified Chinese: 游戏工作室; Pinyin: Yóuxì gōngzuòshì) or "play-money workshops" (打钱工作室 Dǎqián gōngzuò shì). The abbreviation is 打G, where the G stands for "gold". Prisoners in Laogai camps have been forced to engage in gold farming for the financial benefit of prison authorities. A popular massively multiplayer online role-playing game subject to gold farming in China is World of Warcraft. The Chinese government banned using virtual currency to buy real-world items in 2009 but not the reverse.

=== Japan ===
In response to increases in gold farming, in 2006, the Japanese Government urged the computer game industry to self-regulate as well as vowing to investigate this species of fraud.

=== South Korea ===
A Korean high court's 2010 ruling meant that exchanging virtual currency for real money was legal in this country although subject to taxation. However, in 2012, this practice was set to be banned alongside a raft of other means to cheat in games, and gold farmers could face stiff penalties—up to $45,000 in fines and five years in jail.

=== United States ===
A United States Congressional committee investigated taxation of virtual assets and incomes derived from them in 2006, and the IRS has, in its National Taxpayer Advocate's 2008 Annual Report to Congress, expressed concern that virtual worlds are a growing source of tax noncompliance.

=== Venezuela ===
Due to hyperinflation in Venezuela and the devalued Venezuelan currency, popular MMOs like Runescape and Tibia have been subject to mass gold mining. In Reddit, a user published a racially abusive guide on how to kill Venezuelans in the “player-v-player” places where the gold farming takes place; the guide was followed by intemperate comments. The moderators removed the post and the comments afterwards. Considering many gold farmers utilize Bitcoin as an intermediate currency, regulation or taxation isn't feasible at the moment. During the 2019 Venezuelan blackouts, RuneScape's trading market suffered an "economic crisis" due to the reduced number of goods, as Venezuelans could not access the game.

=== Lawsuits by game companies ===
Zynga, the makers of FarmVille, filed a lawsuit to stop online sales of its in-game currency. The lawsuit never went to trial.

Jagex, the makers of RuneScape, have engaged in legal actions against several gold farmers and bot programmers.

On February 1, 2008, Blizzard Entertainment, the makers of World of Warcraft, won a lawsuit against In Game Dollar, trading under the name Peons4Hire. The court ordered an injunction that immediately halted all business operations within said game.

== Game sweatshop ==
A business producing avatars and in-game currency in MMORPGs is sometimes labelled a game sweatshop. Workers employed by these companies either collect in-game currency (known as gold farming) or generate high-level avatars (known as power leveling). Such organizations are referred to as sweatshops because the gold farmers are usually paid very low wages.

== Development potential ==
Gold farming has been discussed as a tool for socioeconomic development by the United Kingdom's Department for International Development and University of Manchester professor Richard Heeks. The money involved is small enough to flow easily from many first-world players but large enough to make a difference to the people doing the work. Gold farmers receive a higher percentage of sale revenue from their work than do farmers of fair trade coffee.

== In the media ==
Neal Stephenson's 2011 novel Reamde has a plot centered on an online game that encourages gold farming.

Cory Doctorow's 2004 short story "Anda's Game", 2010 novel For The Win, and 2014 graphic novel In Real Life (based on his short story, "Anda's Game", and illustrated by Jen Wang) include references to gold farming.

Alan Harris's radio play The Gold Farmer was broadcast on BBC Radio 3 as part of The Wire series on February 6, 2010. It features a man who plays an online role-playing game and whose next door neighbour is a gold farmer.

A 2006 art project by UBERMORGEN.COM, Chinese Gold, used found video and machinima to document and explore the Chinese gold farming phenomenon.

Julian Dibbell's 2006 book Play Money: Or, How I Quit My Day Job and Made Millions Trading Virtual Loot chronicles the author's efforts to earn so much virtual money playing online games that he could quit his day job.

== Discourse ==
In the game World of Warcraft, friction resulted from U.S. players of the 2004 release finding themselves competing with Chinese-based players who were employed to generate in-game resources to be sold on trading sites. In addition to these differences in play style, the game had no translation features for in-game chat and therefore there was little communication between English-speaking and non-English speaking players. In her analysis of gold farming, media scholar Lisa Nakamura wrote that although "players cannot see each other's body while playing, specific forms of game labor, such as gold farming and selling, as well as specific styles of play, have become racialized as Chinese, producing new forms of networked racism that are particularly easy for players to disavow."

== See also ==
- Digital currency
- Blockchain game
- Powerleveling
- Virtual economy
- Virtual goods
- Cheating in videogames
