= Engine City (novel) =

2002 novel by Ken MacLeod

First edition (publ. Orbit Books) Cover artist: Lee Gibbons

Engine City is a science fiction novel by Scottish writer Ken MacLeod, published in 2002. It is the third novel in the Engines of Light Trilogy.

The novel follows on from Dark Light and is also set in the "Second Sphere", primarily in the city of Nova Babylonia, the plot centering on the arrival of humans from the edge of the sphere offering immortality and warning of an impending alien invasion.

== Literary significance and reception ==
The Publishers Weekly review for the novel said:

MacLeod (Dark Light) includes several of his trademark political debates and these are as engaging as always. The Multipliers, eight-legged creatures whose appendages subdivide to the point where they can manipulate matter on the atomic level, are fascinating and very alien indeed. The novel doesn't stand well on its own, but should please fans of the series as well as readers who appreciate hard SF with a political bent.
