= Who's Afraid of Wolf 359? =

- Short story by Ken MacLeod
- Language: English
- Genre(s): Science fiction

Publication
- Published in: The New Space Opera
- Publication type: Book
- Publication date: June 2007

"Who's Afraid of Wolf 359?" is a science fiction short story by British writer Ken MacLeod, published in 2007. It was nominated for the 2008 Hugo Award for Best Short Story. It is set in the same fictional universe as MacLeod's 2005 novel Learning the World. It was reprinted in 2017 in Clarkesworld.

== Plot summary ==
The story follows a man who is running from security officers on a space station after he was caught having an affair with the station's owner. He is apprehended and fined a very large amount of money. To pay off his huge debt, he accepts a dangerous and time-consuming assignment to find out what happened to an experimental colony around the red dwarf Wolf 359. When he arrives, he finds that the remains of the space habitats have been used to create a new planet, before helping the barbaric inhabitants save themselves from destruction and found a new galactic empire.
