= Ben Jeapes =

British speculative fiction writer

- Jeapes along with a Cyberman character
- Born: 14 February 1965 (age 61); Belfast

Ben Jeapes (born 14 February 1965) is a British science fiction writer living in Abingdon-on-Thames, Oxfordshire.

== Early life and education ==
Jeapes was born in Belfast in 1965. He was educated at Hampton Dene Primary School, Hereford, Little Chalfont Primary School, Lorraine Primary School, Camberley, Dumpton Prep School, and Sherborne School, and studied Philosophy and Politics at the University of Warwick.

== Literary career ==
Jeapes began writing science fiction at the age of 18. He has published over 18 short stories, and 7 novels. His first full-length novel was His Majesty's Starship, which concerns the actions of several Earth countries competing for the chance to start again on a new world.

His fourth novel The New World Order, is an alternate history novel set during the English Civil War in which technologically advanced Neanderthals come to England at the peak of the conflict. The leader of the invading forces attempts to avoid inflicting suffering upon the English people, but soon comes under pressure from superiors who disapprove of his soft-footed approach.

His novel Phoenicia's Worlds, a space opera, was published in August 2013 by Solaris Books.

== Published books ==
=== Standalone ===
- His Majesty's Starship (1998) - published as The Ark in the US in 2000
- Wingèd Chariot (2000) - republished as Time's Chariot in 2008
- The Xenocide Mission (2002)
- The New World Order (2004)
- Phoenicia's Worlds (2013)

=== Vampire Plague ===
As a ghostwriter, Jeapes wrote the first three books in the Vampire Plagues series (Scholastic UK, 2004 to 2006), published under the collective pseudonym Sebastian Rook. The series was completed with three subsequent books written by Helen Hart.

- London (2004); US title, London, 1850
- Paris (2004); US title, Paris, 1850
- Mexico (2005); US title, Mexico, 1850

=== Collections ===
- Jeapes Japes (2009), published by Wizard's Tower Press.
