= Dave Hutchinson =

English author

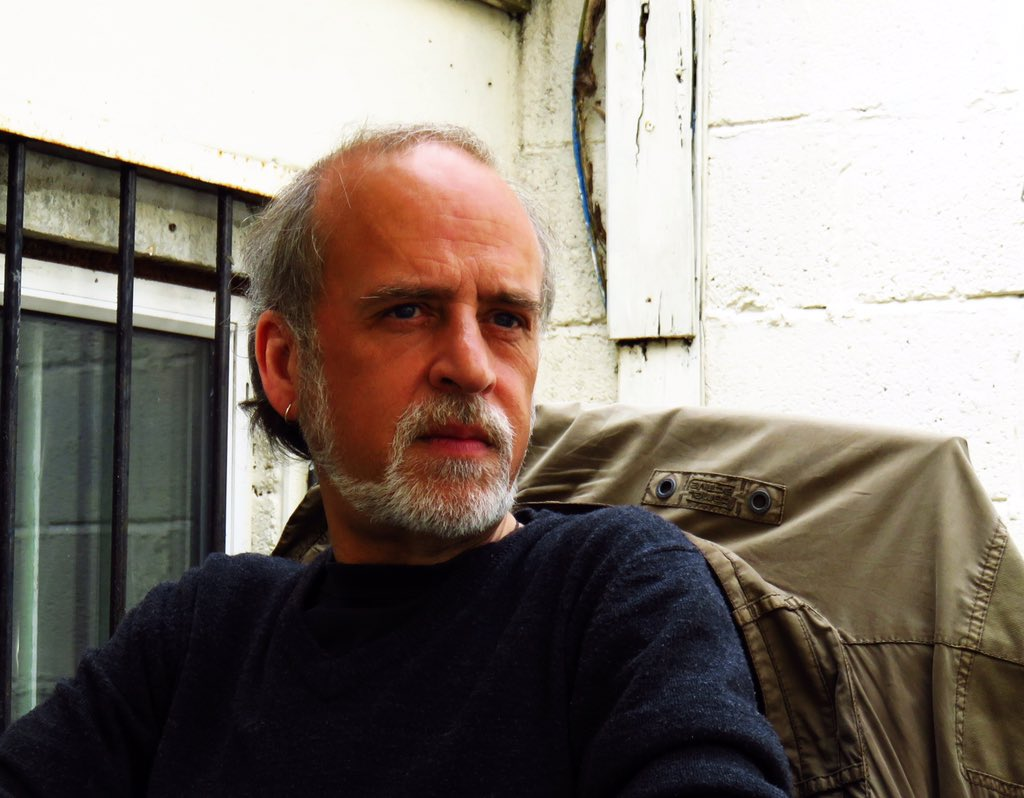
Portrait photograph of Dave Hutchinson (author) by Cecilia Weightman, copyright 2015

Dave Hutchinson is a science fiction writer who was born in Sheffield in England in 1960 and read American Studies at the University of Nottingham. He subsequently moved into journalism, writing for The Weekly News and The Courier for almost 25 years.

He is best known for his Fractured Europe series, which has received multiple award nominations, with the third novel, Europe in Winter, winning the BSFA Award for Best Novel.

== Early writing career ==
By the age of 21, Hutchinson had published four volumes of stories: Thumbprints (1978), Fools' Gold (1979), Torn Air (1980) and The Paradise Equation (1981), all under the name David Hutchinson.

Writing as Dave Hutchinson, in 2004 he published As the Crow Flies, his fifth collection of short fiction, and combined elements of horror, science fiction and fantasy. His first novel, The Villages (2001), blends elements of fantasy, science fiction and the supernatural. It was followed by a novella, The Push (2009, NewCon Press), a science fiction story set in space, describing the inception of faster-than-light travel and speculating on the possible consequences of humans settling on planets populated by alien beings. It was shortlisted for the 2010 BSFA award for short fiction.

Hutchinson has also edited two anthologies and co-edited a third. His short story "The Incredible Exploding Man" was included in the first Solaris Rising anthology and appeared in the 29th Year’s Best Science Fiction collection.

== Recent works ==
Hutchinson's novel Europe in Autumn (2014), published by Solaris Books (now Rebellion Publishing), is a speculative espionage thriller and takes place in a fragmenting near-future Europe. The central plot involves the protagonist, Estonian chef Rudi, becoming involved in Les Coureurs des Bois, a mysterious postal service that also delivers humans across borders. The novel featured in a number of annual best-of-the-year round-ups, including those of The Guardian, The Huffington Post and Locus magazine. The Los Angeles Review of Books described Europe in Autumn as "one of the most sophisticated science fiction novels of the decade". Europe at Midnight (2015), also published by Solaris/Rebellion, is neither a sequel nor a prequel, but rather a standalone title set in the world created for Europe In Autumn. The second book was included in the 2015 Locus Recommended Reading List.

A third novel in the series, Europe in Winter, was published in November 2016, with the first book's protagonist returning. Hutchinson completed the series with Europe at Dawn in 2018, but indicated there may be a further novella at some point in the future. A fifth Fractured Europe novel, Cold Water, with "a new cast of characters", was published in 2022.

== Achievements ==
In 2010 Hutchinson’s novella The Push was nominated for the BSFA Short Fiction Award.

Europe in Autumn received multiple award nominations, including the British Science Fiction Association's BSFA Award for Best Novel and the John W. Campbell Award. In 2015 the novel was shortlisted for the Arthur C. Clarke Award and John W. Campbell Memorial Award, and appeared on the Locus Recommended Reading list.

In 2016 Europe at Midnight was nominated for the BSFA Award for Best Novel, the Kitschies, Arthur C. Clarke Award, and the John W. Campbell Memorial Award.

In 2017 Europe in Winter won the BSFA Award for Best Novel.

In 2019, Europe at Dawn was nominated for the BSFA Award for Best Novel and Dragon Award for Best Science Fiction Novel, and was in the Locus Recommended Reading list. Shelter also appeared in the Locus list.

== Selected bibliography ==
=== Novels ===
==== Fractured Europe Sequence ====
1. Europe in Autumn (2014)
2. Europe at Midnight (2015)
3. Europe in Winter (Nov 2016)
4. Europe at Dawn (Nov 2018)
5. Cold Water (2022)

==== Other novels ====
- The Villages (2002)
- Shelter (2018)
- The Return of the Incredible Exploding Man (2019)
- Sanctuary (2023)

=== Short fiction collections ===
- Thumbprints (1978) [as David Hutchinson]
- Fool's Gold (1979) [as David Hutchinson]
- Torn Air (1980) [as David Hutchinson]
- The Paradise Equation (1981) [as David Hutchinson]
- As the Crow Flies (2004)
- Sleeps with Angels (2015)

=== Anthology series ===
- Strange Pleasures
- Strange Pleasures 2 (2003) with John Grant
- Strange Pleasures 3 (2005)

=== Stories in anthologies ===
- Under the Rose (2009)
- World's Collider: A Shared-World Anthology (2012)

=== Novellas ===
- The Push (2009)
- Lord Huw and the Romance of Stone (2012)
- Acadie (2017)
- Nomads (2019)

=== Short fiction ===
- "(I've Got) Fairies at the Bottom of My Garden" (1980) [as David Hutchinson]
- "Abyss" (1980) [as David Hutchinson]
- "Encroachments" (1980) [as David Hutchinson]
- "How to Save the World and Influence People" (1980) [as David Hutchinson]
- "Sleepy Eyes" (1980) [as David Hutchinson]
- "The Transplacement Trick" (1980) [as David Hutchinson]
- "The Visible Man" (1980) [as David Hutchinson]
- "Thumbprints" (1980) [as David Hutchinson]
- "Treasure Love" (1980) [as David Hutchinson]
- "What Makes the Flowers Grow?" (1980) [as David Hutchinson]
- "Zone of Silence" (1980) [as David Hutchinson]
- "Wspomnienia" (1994)
- "The Trauma Jockey" (1997)
- "Tir-na-nOg" (2000)
- "Mice" (2001)
- "Discreet Phenomena" (2001)
- "Scuffle" (2002)
- "Fear of Strangers" (2002)
- "All the News, All the Time, from Everywhere" (2003)
- "A Dream of Locomotives" (2004)
- "Henry's Eden" (2004)
- "Life on Mars" (2004)
- "On the Windsor Branch" (2004)
- "Pavane of the Sons of the Morning" (2004)
- "Suburban Angels" (2004)
- "The Pavement Artist" (2004)
- "When We Learn to Fly" (2004)
- "You Can't Get Off at Cockfosters" (2004)
- "Mellowing Grey" (2008)
- "Multitude" (2008)
- "The Incredible Exploding Man" (2011)
- "Beyond the Sea" (2012)
- "Dalí's Clocks" (2015)
- "Sic Transit Gloria Mundi" (2015)
- "Sugar Engines" (2015)
- "The Fortunate Isles" (2015)
- "The Silver Monkey" (2015)
- "Catacomb Saints" (2016)

=== Essays ===
- "We Really Liked This, But ..." (2003) with John Grant
- "Introduction" to Sleeps with Angels (2015)

=== Online interviews, podcasts, etc. ===
- Interview: Dave Hutchinson, author of Europe in Autumn
- Catching up with Dave Hutchinson, author of Europe at Midnight
- https://www.sffworld.com/2015/11/dave-hutchinson-interview/
- https://brsbkblog.blogspot.co.nz/2016/09/interview-with-dave-hutchison.html
