= The Star Fraction =

1995 novel by Ken MacLeod

- First edition
- Author: Ken MacLeod
- Cover artist: Angus McKie
- Language: English
- Genre: Science fiction
- Publisher: Legend Books
- Publication date: 1995
- Publication place: United Kingdom
- Media type: Print (Paperback)

The Star Fraction is a science fiction novel by Scottish writer Ken MacLeod, his first, published in 1995. The major themes are radical political thinking, a functional anarchist microstate, oppression, and revolution. The action takes place in a balkanized UK, about halfway into the 21st century. The novel was nominated for the Arthur C. Clarke Award in 1996. It is the first book of two series, including a trilogy ending with The Cassini Division and a parallel universe series with The Sky Road.

== Plot summary ==
The world is controlled by the US/UN, a sort of semi-benign meta-dictatorship which does not rule directly but enforces a series of basic laws on a vast number of microstates, many of which are in a near-constant state of low-intensity warfare. Among the laws enforced on them is a prohibition on certain directions of research, such as intelligence augmentation or artificial intelligence. Precisely what is prohibited is of course secret, and as violation of the prohibitions will result in the swift and efficient death of everyone directly involved, scientific research is a dangerous proposition at best.

The main characters (a Trotskyist mercenary, a libertarian teenager from a fundamentalist microstate, and an idealistic scientist) find themselves caught up at the centre of a global revolution against the US/UN. The revolution was planned and partially automated by financial software, and it was set to break out after a certain set of conditions are met.

The stakes are raised at the end of the book, when it is revealed that the autonomous financial software has evolved into an intelligent form, which might cause the paranoid US/UN to make a "clean break" with Earth, knocking the planet back to the Stone Age with the orbital defence lasers.

== Series ==
The Star Fraction is the first book of two series: one is a trilogy, and ends in The Cassini Division with a war between humans and a society of uploads inhabiting the massively re-engineered Jupiter; the other consists of The Star Fraction and The Sky Road, and occupies a parallel universe, in which one of the main characters makes a different decision at the end of the first novel, which results in a very different, catastrophic outcome.

== Reception ==
Gideon Kibblewhite reviewed The Star Fraction for Arcane magazine, rating it a 5 out of 10 overall. Kibblewhite comments that "Pluses of the book [...] include a clever and well-described future culture that might be fun to play in (its institutions and factions have armed militia who act as legal terrorists in a game) and a great set of baddies who operate from cyberspace."

== Reviews ==
- Review by David Langford (1995) in SFX, #4
- Review by Paul J. McAuley (1995) in Interzone, #100 October 1995
- Review by Ian Covell (1995) in The Edge, Vol. 2, #1, November 1995
- Review by Chris Amies (1995) in Vector 184 Summer 1995
- Review by Tom Shippey (1996) in The New York Review of Science Fiction, February 1996
- Review by John D. Owen (1996) in Vector 190
- Review by John Newsinger (1996) in Foundation, #67 Summer 1996
- Review by Lawrence Person (1997) in Science Fiction Eye, #15, Fall 1997
- Review [French] by Jan Bardeau (1998) in Yellow Submarine, #125
- Review by Russell Letson (2001) in Locus, #488 September 2001
- Review by uncredited (2002) in Vector 225
- Review [German] by Gregor Jungheim (2003) in Alien Contact, Jahrbuch #1 2002

== See also ==
- The Dispossessed
