= Vampire Plagues =

Series of young adult historical horror novels

- London, 1850; Paris, 1850; Mexico, 1850; Outbreak; Epidemic; Extermination
- Author: Ben Jeapes (books 1-3); Helen Hart (books 4-6)
- Publisher: Scholastic Publishing
- Published: 2004
- No. of books: 6

Vampire Plagues (sometimes also titled Vampire Dusk) is a historical horror young adult series of six novels (London, 1850, Paris, 1850, Mexico, 1850, Outbreak, Epidemic and Extermination). The series is credited under the pseudonym Sebastian Rook (this being due to the plot being devised by a third party not writing) with the first three books were written by Ben Jeapes and released in 2004 while the last three were written by Helen Hart and released in 2005 and 2006. The first three books are a trilogy that follow the three children, Jack Harkett, Benedict Cole and Emily Cole as they battle an ancient evil spreading in 1850 while the later three are their own trilogy with separate plots.
