= Intrusion (novel) =

2012 novel by Ken MacLeod

- First edition
- Author: Ken MacLeod
- Cover artist: Nico Taylor
- Language: English
- Genre: Science fiction
- Publisher: Orbit Books
- Publication date: March 2012
- Publication place: United Kingdom
- Media type: Print (Hardcover and Paperback)
- Pages: 387
- ISBN: 1-84149-939-0

Intrusion is a 2012 science fiction novel by British writer Ken MacLeod.

== Plot summary ==
The protagonists are Hugh and Hope Morrison, a couple with a young son in a near-future, post-climate change London during the "Warm War". The United Kingdom is governed by the Labour Party in a technocratic government that pursues a policy of a "free and social market" by, in the words of one of its MPs, intervening to allow people to make the choices they would have made if only they had had all the information. In practice, this amounts to an attempt to create a conformist dystopia, "strongly encouraging" its citizens to make "the right choice". This brings the pregnant Hope into conflict with the state when she decides that she does not want to take "the Fix", a single-dose pill that would correct genetic errors in her unborn child. This draws her, Hugh and the state into a moral dilemma as she struggles against the pressure to conform.

== Reception ==
Cory Doctorow reviewed Intrusion as "a new kind of dystopian novel: a vision of a near future "benevolent dictatorship" run by Tony Blair-style technocrats who believe freedom isn't the right to choose, it's the right to have the government decide what you would choose, if only you knew what they knew."

The SFX review concluded "Intrusion is a finely-tuned, in-your-face argument of a novel that will annoy just about every reader (including this reviewer!) at some point. Whichever end of the political spectrum you fall, on MacLeod will push your buttons – and make you think."

The novel made it onto the Locus Recommended Reading List for 2012 and is one of five novels nominated for the 2013 BSFA Award for Best Novel. It has also been shortlisted for the 2013 Arthur C. Clarke Award.
