= City of the Iron Fish =

1994 novel by Simon Ings

- First UK edition cover
- Author: Simon Ings
- Language: English
- Genre: Fantasy novel
- Publisher: HarperCollins
- Publication date: 1994
- Publication place: United Kingdom
- Media type: Print (paperback original, e-book)
- Pages: 314
- ISBN: 978-0-00-647653-5

City of the Iron Fish is a fantasy novel by English science fiction and fantasy author Simon Ings. It was first published in July 1994 in the United Kingdom as a paperback original by HarperCollins. The book is about an isolated city bounded by nothing that transforms itself every 20 years through magic evoking rituals.

The novel has been compared to Mervyn Peake's Gormenghast (1950), and M. John Harrison's fictional city Viriconium. Ings said that he wrote City of the Iron Fish in six weeks while in a brothel in Oporto, Portugal, "on the run from my reputation as a cyberpunk writer".

== Plot summary ==
The story opens when a 12-year-old Thomas Kemp experiences his first Ceremony of the Stuffing and Hanging of the Iron Fish. Tom lives in the City, (Note: The city is unnamed and is referred to as "the City" throughout the book.) which is built on two steep hills separated by a deep gorge with a marble river running through it. The hills are connected by a bridge. The City is located in the middle of a desert, surrounded by mountains, beyond which, it is said, there is nothing. The inhabitants' dream of the ocean, have boats and fishing nets, yet have never seen the sea.

Every 20 years Ceremonies are performed to renew the City. The construction of the huge fish and the associated rituals are performed according to rules passed down over generations, and the magic enacted changes the City in unpredictable ways: streets and houses move, the ground rises and falls. Tom's father is a dedicated follower of the rituals and has access to ancient books detailing their procedures. But the City has modernized, and less attention is paid to these rituals, resulting in fewer changes with each Ceremony.

One day a gypsy from outside the City visits Tom's father, and Tom learns that there is literally nothing beyond the mountains. The gypsies believe there was once a world of oceans and forests, but that it was lost. They still search the borders for a way back to this "given world". Later Tom queries the gypsy beliefs but is told by his father that they are just stories. To quell Tom's curiosity, he tells him to perform the ritual of making a doll, climbing the huge girders that support the bridge, and placing it at their apex.

After Tom's father dies, he enters the Academy. There he is exposed to philosophies on the nature of the City, its isolation, and the role of the Ceremonies, which, it is believed, evoke real magic to keep the City from degrading. Tom meets Blythe, an art student, and takes her to the bridge to show her the doll he placed in the girders as a child. They argue that if they dream of forests and oceans, a wider world must exist, a Greater Realm in which the City resides. Tom and Blythe decide to see if they can break out of the City's "bubble", but find that beyond the mountains there really is nothing. At the edge, they see that objects become blocky, like crude drawings, and reality breaks down. Tom observes that "shade by shade, subtlety by subtlety, the world was going out—".

Back in the City, and disillusioned by their discovery, Tom immerses himself in art. But later black-clad women invade the City. Originally thought to be beggars, they are gypsies disillusioned by their inability to break out of the City's bubble. They become destructive, attack artists and their art, and burn books. Disturbed by these events, Tom abandons art, believing that "the time for art was past and the time for bonfires was upon us".

As the next 20-year Ceremony approaches, Tom discovers that Dr. Binns from the Academy, with the aid of his father's books, is determined to save the City by reenacting the rituals exactly as they used to be performed. He shows Blythe how to make a new Iron Fish. However, very few people are interested in these "superstitions", and the new Ceremony is performed by a small band of devotees. But as it nears completion, black-clad women interrupt proceedings by building a pyre. Unbeknown to Tom, Binns plans on sacrificing the Fishmaker (Blythe) on the pyre in accordance with the rituals. He had enlisted the help of the black-clad women, who believed they would be disrupting the Ceremony. But Tom rescues Blythe and Binns is murdered by the women who realise he was using them.

Believing that the Ceremony has failed, Tom and Blythe are surprised to see Tom's doll rise from the bridge, tower over the City, and proceed to consume it. They realise that it was not Binns's rituals that evoked the magic, but Tom's doll that was waiting for the next Ceremony. The City transforms and reassembles itself on an island surrounded by an ocean. Tom and Blythe, still convinced that there is a Greater Realm, set out once again to try to break out of the City's bubble.

== Reception ==
Regina Schroeder wrote in a review in Booklist that she found City of the Iron Fish a "compelling" book, and described it as "a strangely fascinating view of a terribly bounded existence". A reviewer on Novel Reflections described it as "a deeply strange book", and was pleased that Ings made no attempt to resolve the city's mystery, or explain how the iron fish's magic transforms it.

American writer and critic Gary K. Wolfe called City of the Iron Fish "baroque and wildly inventive". In a review in Locus, Wolfe described the novel as "dense with imagery and incident" and full of "hints and mysteries". He described Ings as having "a genuinely original visual imagination", and said the novel is "a rare treat" for those "willing to enjoy mysteries of artifice and meaning".

In a review in Vector, the critical magazine of the British Science Fiction Association, Steve Jeffery called City of the Iron Fish "a fabulous construct" filled with characters equally "strange and fabulous", all trapped in a "desperate fatalism". In it he saw shades of Harrison's Viriconium, the ritual observations of Peake's Gormenghast, and Delany's Nevèrÿon, The work's "baroque architectur[e] ... and distorted perspectives" reminded him of Bosch, Esher and Miller. Jeffery said City of the Iron Fish "is as often disconcerting as it is both funny and occasionally horrifying".

== Works cited ==
- Ings, Simon (2014) [1994]. City of the Iron Fish (e-book ed.). London: Orion Publishing Group.
