= Dissent (Australian magazine) =

Australian national magazine

- Editor: Kenneth Davidson and Lesley Vick
- Categories: News magazine
- Frequency: 3 issues per annum
- Founded: 2000
- Final issue: Autumn/Winter 2014
- Company: Dissent Publications Pty Ltd (ABN 87 089 625 490)
- Country: Australia
- Based in: Melbourne
- Language: Australian English
- Website: dissent.com.au
- ISSN: 1443-2102

Dissent (rendered on the masthead as D!SSENT) was an Australian national magazine devoted to the analysis of politics, economics and issues in Australian society in general. It was published three times a year in Melbourne, Australia. The Co-editors were Kenneth Davidson and Lesley Vick. Kenneth Davidson also has a monthly column with the Melbourne newspaper The Age.

The magazine has no formal ties with any political party or group but as stated on its website the content reflects the Editors' views which dissent from the prevailing orthodoxy that the welfare state should be cut back in favour of economic efficiency and unfettered individual liberty.

An earlier journal with the same title was published in Melbourne, Australia, from 1961 until 1978. It was subtitled, "A radical quarterly". The later issues were published in co-operation with the Students' Representative Council of the University of Melbourne.

In April 2014 it was announced that Number 44, Autumn/Winter 2014 would be the final edition of D!ssent.

== Contributors ==
Contributors have included Andrew Wilkie, Beatrice Faust, Marilyn Lake, Brian Walters, John Quiggin, David Hill, Barry Jones, Kerry Nettle, Mark Diesendorf, Don Aitkin, Evan Whitton, Mick Dodson, James Jupp, John Langmore, and Graham Palmer.
