= Ark (novel) =

2009 novel by Stephen Baxter

- First edition
- Author: Stephen Baxter
- Language: English
- Genre: Hard science fiction
- Publisher: Gollancz
- Publication date: 20 August 2009
- Publication place: United Kingdom
- Media type: Print (hardback)
- Pages: 512
- ISBN: 0-575-08057-4
- OCLC: 320406261
- Preceded by: Flood

Ark is a 2009 hard science fiction novel by English author Stephen Baxter. It is a sequel to his 2008 novel Flood. Ark deals with the journey of the starship Ark One, and the continuing human struggle for survival on Earth after the catastrophic events of Flood. The series continues in three pendant stories, which are described in the plot summary below.

Being hard SF, Ark contains many references to unrealised or hypothesised technology (Project Orion, the Alcubierre drive), physics (antimatter), and hypotheses about extraterrestrial life. Baxter credits several books and academic works in an afterword: See Scientific background below.

== Plot summary ==
The events of Ark overlap with those of Flood: in preparation for a flood that will completely submerge the Earth's continents by 2052, the billionaire Nathan Lammockson builds Ark Three, a gigantic ship that will sail the waters of the drowned Earth. Skeptical of the project's viability, the U.S. government recruits billionaires Edward Kenzie, Patrick Groundwater, and Jerzy Glemp to fund the construction of Ark One (later renamed Project Nimrod), a generation ship capable of superluminal travel using an Alcubierre warp drive. The plan is to fly Ark One to an Earth-like exoplanet and rebuild civilisation on the new world. The nature of Ark Two is top secret.

Ark One requires 80 humans of maximum genetic diversity to prevent inbreeding among their descendants, to be trained from a young age in spaceship maintenance. These "Candidates" include: Holle Groundwater, daughter of Patrick, specialising in life support systems; Zane Glemp, son of Jerzy, specialising in warp drive physics; Kelly Kenzie, daughter of Edward, a natural leader who is named mission commander; and Wilson Argent, a pilot. They train in an academy in Denver, Colorado, repurposed as the U.S. capital after the flooding of Washington, D.C.

Progress on the Ark's construction is slow, so the military takes over the Project. Initial plans to assemble the Ark in space are scrapped in favor of a Project Orion-style nuclear drive, which will send the ground-built Ark towards Jupiter. There, it will gather antimatter particles created by gravitational interactions with Io to power the warp drive; in addition, a sunshade will allow its telescopes to conduct spectroscopic analysis of exoplanets in the hopes of discovering the chemical signatures of life.

Mere weeks before the launch, some Candidates are forced out to make room for "gatecrashers," whose presence on the ship was guaranteed in exchange for funding from their affluent parents. Grace Gray, a protagonist of Flood, is one of them. In addition, military mutineers (nicknamed "Illegals" by the crew) force their way onto the ship. Nevertheless, the launch is successful, and by 2042, they have gathered more than enough antimatter and head for a promising "Earth II" planet in the 82 Eridani system. During transit, it emerges that Zane has dissociative identity disorder due to abusive parenting and sexual molestation by his Academy tutor, while Wilson begins challenging Kelly's leader status. A pregnant Grace gives birth to a daughter, Helen, and the crew suffer deaths and damage during a fire caused by a Candidate's attempted murder of an Illegal. Kelly loses respect when she amputates the instigator as punishment, which increases Wilson's power.

9 years later, they arrive and discover that Earth II is sub-optimal: its high axial tilt creates temperature extremes on either side of its equator, making minimal land livable. It is also poor in minerals, presumably exhausted by a previous civilisation that left ruined buildings behind. The crew are of three minds over what to do next: Wilson, Holle, and Grace join a majority deciding to push on to "Earth III", which is 30 years' travel away in the constellation of Lepus. Kelly leads a group returning to Earth while a minority colonises Earth II. Once the colonists land, the remaining passengers split up the ship's two hulls, and the warp drive to go their separate ways, losing simulated gravity in the process.

When Kelly's group water land on the flooded Earth, they make radio contact with scientist Thandie Jones, who discovered the cause of the flooding in Flood. She, in turn, contacts Edward Kenzie, who dispatches a submarine to take them to Ark Two, which turns out to be an underwater habitat powered by the geothermal heat of Yellowstone. Edward berates his daughter for failing him, and Kelly learns that former Candidate Don Meisel and Ground Control commander Gordo Alonzo have both died battling angry displaced persons. She awkwardly reunites with her estranged son and her lover from her Academy days. Edward hopes to eventually colonise the Earth's mantle with a race of genetically modified humans. (Baxter had explored a similar idea in the novel Flux).

Meanwhile, the situation in Holle's hull deteriorates as Wilson leads a corrupt gang with his Illegal henchmen. Kelly had kidnapped the ship's only doctor, so Zane is no longer undergoing therapy and spreads rumours that the ship is a virtual reality simulation. The shipborn children, having never seen Earth for themselves, believe him and start a mutiny. Hoping to reveal the ship to be a simulation, they remove a metal plate from the hull, causing an uncontrolled decompression which kills and injures many passengers. Wilson escapes in a landing shuttle, but it has been sabotaged, so he returns to the ship in a space suit while the shuttle disintegrates from the warp drive's gravitational effects. A despondent Zane later commits suicide.

Holle assumes control of the ship and executes the head mutineer but keeps Wilson alive because she needs his piloting skills to land on Earth III, a cold tidally locked planet with dense air, a dynamic atmosphere, and a red dwarf sun that fortunately appears a familiar white to the human eye. Since the remaining shuttle cannot seat all the passengers, Holle encourages the passengers to reproduce copiously. Since children weigh little, many will fit on the shuttle, thus increasing genetic diversity. She sends three adults to accompany them: Wilson, Helen Gray, and the Illegal Jeb. Helen and Jeb, whose children are not allowed on the shuttle due to genetic proximity, resentfully board. Wilson sets them down safely on a lake, and they prepare to settle in their new world. The remaining crew on the Ark plan to survey the planetary system and beyond until they die.

=== Pendant stories ===
Three pendant stories have been published since, two in Asimov's Science Fiction: "Earth II" and "Earth III." They were all later published together as "Landfall: Tales From the Flood/Ark Universe."

"Earth II" is set approximately 400 years after the events in Ark and deals with the struggles of the descendants of the 15 Ark One crew members who choose to settle there rather than continue the journey to Earth III. Since Earth II lacks many of the resources needed to build an advanced society (e.g., oil, coal, uranium, precious metals), its peoples (who have now split into warring nations and city states) have reverted mainly to pre-industrial technology, primarily reliant on stone, iron, and wood.

"Earth III" is set approximately 1000 years after the events in Ark and deals with the struggles of the Ark One crew members who choose to settle on Earth III. It is revealed that Helen Gray, Wilson Argent, and Jeb Holden fought and killed each other several years after their shuttle landed, forcing the 37 children who went with them to grow up on their own and develop their society. Zane's quasi-religious idea of the world as a simulated reality persists; however, there is a growing movement of disbelievers.

A third tale, "Earth I," followed in a collection called "Universes" (also published under the title "Landfall"); it is set approximately 10,000 years later. It brings characters from several of the now colonised worlds together and reveals the fate of the raft–dwelling survivors on the original, flooded Earth.

== Critical reception ==
Ark received critical acclaim. Writing in The Guardian, Eric Brown gave the novel a very positive review, concluding that "Never has Baxter presented a more thrilling and moving glimpse of a possible future: Ark could well be his masterpiece." In The Times, Lisa Tuttle also wrote approvingly, calling Ark "a grim but exciting tale of the ultimate in pioneering adventure, in the most unforgiving environment of all." Reviews at Strange Horizons were also very positive.

== Scientific background ==
- George Dyson: Project Orion: Holt: 2002.
- Casoli and Encranz: The New Worlds: Springer-Praxis: 2007.
- Paul Glister: Centauri Dreams: Copernicus: 2004.
- Extraterrestrial Life and Planetary System Ages: Icarus: 151: 307–313: 2001.
- Yoji Kondo: Interstellar Travel and Multi-Generation Space Ships: Apogee: 2003.

Warp Drive and Field References:

- Miguel Alcubierre: Classical and Quantum Gravity: Volume 11: L73-L77: 1994.
- C. Clark et al.: Classical and Quantum Gravity: Volume 16: 3965–72 (1999).
- C.Van Broek: Classical and Quantum Gravity: Volume 16: 3973–9 (1999).
- D.Weiskopf: Visualisation of Four Dimensional Spacetimes: Dissertation, University of Tübingen: 2001.
- Journal of the British Interplanetary Society: 61:9: September 2008: Seminar on Interstellar Propulsion Systems.

== See also ==
- Doomsday event
- Extrasolar planets
- Flood (Baxter novel)
- Red dwarfs
- Faster than light
- 82 Eridani
- Lepus (constellation)
