= Hot Head (novel) =

1992 novel by Simon Ings

- First edition
- Author: Simon Ings
- Cover artist: Stephen Player
- Language: English
- Genre: Science fiction novel
- Publisher: Grafton
- Publication date: 1992
- Publication place: United Kingdom
- Media type: Print
- Pages: 300
- ISBN: 0586214968

Hot Head is a 1992 science fiction novel by English author Simon Ings. Part cyberpunk, part neo-noir, Ings attracted positive reviews from sci-fi enthusiasts for what was his debut novel.

== Plot summary ==
The protagonist is Malise Arnim, a European Muslim who became a cybernetically enhanced warrior. Malise was once the saviour of the world and a socially renowned heroine. However, the authorities removed her artificial enhancements once her skills had ceased to be useful, and left her to sink or swim. In the time being, Malise had been reduced to making porn films to survive. However, she is needed again when a huge artificial asteroid is heading for Earth and destroying everything in its path.
