= The Highway Men (MacLeod novel) =

2006 novella by Ken MacLeod

- Cover of "The Highway Men".
- Author: Ken MacLeod
- Language: English
- Publisher: Sandstone Vista
- Publication date: 2006

"The Highway Men" is a 2006 science fiction novella by British writer Ken MacLeod. It plays out in the Scottish Highlands in a near future dominated by war with China and by climate-change. The book was published by Sandstone Vista, an imprint of Sandstone Press "developed for readers who are not used to full-length novels, or for those who simply want to enjoy a 'quick read.'"

== Plot summary ==
Jase (Jason Mason) works as a lagger, one of a gang of labourers considered "too dumb to draft" into the army and thus conscripted into labour on public works. His group has the task of connecting a new nuclear power station to the grid in the Highlands of Scotland, which have become colder and sparsely inhabited due to climate-change. This takes place against the backdrop of a long-running war between China and the West, which started due to an air-rage incident when a Chinese businessman, under stress due to a smoking-ban, got mistaken for a terrorist.

Jase and his fellow laggers encounter a hitchhiker named Ailiss, whom Jase identifies as one of a group of New Age Settlers (also known as crusties or bandits), people who foresee the imminent end of modern society and who have retreated to a semi-hidden rural commune. However, their presence worries the authorities, who become concerned about the security of their nuclear-power station.

Believing that they have inadvertently set the settlers up for arrest or worse, three laggers travel to the commune to warn them. Discovering the commune under attack, they accidentally defeat the government forces by allowing their truck to crash into and destroy a helicopter. Jase finds himself acclaimed a hero by the settlers, and decides to join them.

== Editions ==
- Dingwall: Sandstone, 2006. ISBN 1-905207-06-9
