= Learning the World =

2005 novel by Ken MacLeod

Learning the World: A Scientific Romance
- Cover of first edition (hardcover)
- Author: Ken MacLeod
- Cover artist: Lee Gibbons
- Language: English
- Genre: Science fiction
- Publisher: Orbit
- Publication date: 2005
- Publication place: United Kingdom
- Media type: Print (Hardback & Paperback)
- Pages: 303
- ISBN: 1-84149-343-0 (hardcover), ISBN 1-84149-344-9 (paperback)
- OCLC: 59878405

Learning the World is a science fiction novel by British writer Ken MacLeod, published in 2005. It won the 2006 Prometheus Award, was nominated for the Hugo, Locus, Clarke, and Campbell Awards that same year, and received a BSFA nomination in 2005. Since the book's publication MacLeod has written two short stories set in the same universe, "Lighting Out" and "Who's Afraid of Wolf 359?".

== Premise ==
A human generation ship named But the Sky, My Lady! The Sky! approaches the Destiny Star to make first contact. The discovery of an industrial age-level alien species (the first encountered by humans) upsets the established protocols of the ship and causes social unrest.

== Reception ==
Carl Hays in his review for Booklist said that "MacLeod continues to dazzle readers with vividly rendered landscapes of technological splendor and fascinating yet plausible visions of humanity's future." Kirkus Reviews writes "MacLeod flips back and forth between stories of the humans and aliens, avoiding the usual pro-human slant and presenting both sides as equally complex. And as humans advance on their planet, the aliens are beginning to wonder why their slave race, the "trudges," is starting to act uppity." Ted Rose in his review for Entertainment Weekly described this novel as "a compelling first-contact scenario, but MacLeod's confusing characters lead to a lackluster close encounter."

== References to other works ==
In the novel MacLeod uses "alien space bats", a science fiction MacGuffin, as characters in the novel as an in-joke. The text of the novel is interlarded with recontextualised quotations from the works of well-known science fiction writers.
