= The Night Sessions =

2008 novel by Ken MacLeod

- First edition (publ. Orbit Books)
- Author: Ken MacLeod
- Language: English
- Publisher: Orbit Books
- Publication date: 2008

The Night Sessions is a 2008 novel by Scottish writer Ken MacLeod. Set in the year 2037, the novel follows Edinburgh police officers investigating the murder of a priest in a world in which religious believers are a small and marginalized minority. The novel won the British Science Fiction Award for Best Novel in 2008.
