= Flood (Baxter novel) =

2008 science fiction novel by Stephen Baxter

- First edition
- Author: Stephen Baxter
- Language: English
- Genre: Science fiction
- Publisher: Gollancz
- Publication date: July 2008
- Publication place: United Kingdom
- Pages: 473
- ISBN: 0-575-08058-2
- OCLC: 219991463
- Followed by: Ark

Flood is a 2008 work of hard science fiction by English author Stephen Baxter. It describes a near future world where deep submarine seismic activity leads to seabed fragmentation, and the opening of deep subterranean reservoirs of water. Human civilisation is almost destroyed by the rising inundation, which covers Mount Everest in 2052. Baxter issued a sequel to this work, entitled Ark, in 2009.

Flood was nominated for the British Science Fiction Award in 2008.

== Synopsis ==
The above effects are catastrophic and exceed current estimates of climate change-related sea level rise. In the opening chapter, four main characters (former USAF Captain Lily Brooke, British military officer Piers Michaelmas, English tourist Helen Gray, and NASA scientist Gary Boyle) are liberated by a private megacorporation called AxysCorp from a Christian extremist Catalan terrorist bunker in Barcelona in 2016, after five years of captivity. AxysCorp was hoping to save a fifth prisoner, John Foreshaw, but he was executed minutes before the rescue. Nonetheless, the corporation continues to look after the four hostages and search for Helen's daughter, Grace, who was conceived in captivity by the son of a Saudi royal and taken by his family. Helen befriends Foreign Office official Michael Thurley, hoping to find her daughter, and the four rescued hostages make a pact to keep in contact.

At this point, sea level changes have already submerged Tuvalu, a low-lying South Pacific island whose inhabitants have been evacuated to New Zealand. London and Sydney are prone to constant flooding. However, as a tidal surge hits London and Sydney, killing many in both cities, scientists become aware that this cannot be explained solely by the consequences of climate change. American oceanographer Thandie Jones uncovers the truth, through deep-sea diving missions to oceanic ridges and trenches, revealing that the seabed has fragmented. There is turbulence that can only be attributable to the infusion of vast underground reservoirs of hitherto hypothesised but undetected oceanic masses of water (see below).

Over the next 30 years, sea levels rise exponentially, inundating the world as the main characters struggle for survival in a vast, ever-changing environment. Lily, her sister Amanda, and Amanda's children Benj and Kristie experience the flooding and abandonment of London. Amanda and her children settle into a refugee settlement in Dartmoor, but the rising floodwaters make that only a temporary respite. In 2019, a tsunami obliterates western coastal cities in the UK, killing Helen Gray and tens of thousands of others. At the same time, NYC is demolished by a storm surge, and DC is evacuated. For the next 20 years, Denver becomes the capital of the steadily diminishing USA, which fragments as individual states assert their own survival needs.

By 2020, much of the eastern coast of the USA, as well as Sacramento, on its western coast, is underwater. AxysCorp CEO Nathan Lammockson, the man who ordered the main characters' rescue and an indirect friend of Lily, has a contingency plan for the survival of an affluent Western minority, which involves evacuation to the mountainous Peruvian Andes. Lily, Amanda, her children, and Piers tag along to the settlement, where Nathan discloses that he knows the extent of global inundation, which will not stop until all land on Earth is submerged. As the USA is eroded, a contingent of refugees, including Gary, Thandie, and Grace, heads south to meet Lily. When they reach Nathan's 'Project City' in Peru, they are swept up in a revolt that tries to seize control of the former elite settlement, which results in the deaths of Amanda, Benj, and Kristie's husband, Ollantay, a self-claimed Inca descendant who leads the revolt. Gary parts ways with Lily as he hands over Grace, so they, along with Piers and Kristie, board Nathan's "Ark Three," a Queen Mary- sized (and shaped) ocean vessel that sets sail in 2035. By then, most of Europe, Russia, the Americas, Oceania, and Africa are inundated.

Ark Three sails the global ocean in search of trading partners and finding higher ground; despite running into skirmishes with pirates that lead to Lily falling overboard and staying on a submarine with Thandie for a year, the survivors head for Tibet. However, when they arrive, Nepal's Maoist rulers have devastating news – Tibet is ruled by a Khmer Rouge-like regime that practices human slavery and cannibalism. Ark Three heads out to sea but has nowhere to go, given that the floods are now lapping around the Rocky Mountains. Seaborn piracy is rife from those refugee Seaborn populations who have taken to scavenging the refuse from the posthumous remains of human civilization, and after a visit to coastal Colorado, the pirates ultimately board and destroy Ark Three.

By 2048, the Andes, Rocky Mountains, and elsewhere have been submerged. Tibet's regime is no more, and Australia, North America, South America, Africa, and most of Asia except for the highest mountains in the Himalayas have been flooded. As Lily, Gary, and Thandie settle into life as sea-dwelling survivors, Piers, Nathan, and Kirstie die in staggered succession since the sinking of Ark Three. The novel ends in 2052, as a group of survivors watches the submergence of the peak of Mount Everest. Lily has survived and wonders what the grandchildren of her late sister's family and her old hostage comrades from 30 years ago will make of post-deluge Earth, now at a new environmental equilibrium, with a vast global storm system that is reminiscent of those on Jupiter and Neptune.

Civilization is virtually dead at the novel's end. Survivors exist only on the rafts and some decrepit surviving former navy vessels. The children of the rafts, raised on the water, begin to build their own aquatic culture. By the novel's end, extinction seems inevitable for humanity on Earth. However, we learn later in the book that Ark Three (the aforementioned ocean liner) was one of many projects created by AxysCorp and a few other groups. One of these (Ark One) was a starship project, which was taken over by the remnant government of the USA and launched as Denver flooded in 2041; at that time, earlier in the novel, Lily had managed to get Grace aboard it just before it launched, and at the time she was unwillingly pregnant with the child of Nathan's snobbish and estranged son, Hammond. In 2044, a lunar eclipse occurs, just as a massive burst of light is sighted near Jupiter, and the survivors realise it must be Ark One, and Grace's survival is thus ensured.

As they prepare to leave the former site of Mount Everest, Lily realizes something. She sailed on Ark Three, and Ark One is a starship. In closing, she asks, "What is Ark Two?" This question ends the novel and sets the scene for Baxter's sequel, Ark, in which it is resolved.

== "Hard science" basis for novel ==
In a short afterword, Baxter claims to have based his work on a hypothesis related to possible subterranean oceans within the Earth's mantle. His other references are cursory, although one refers to the presence of such immense reservoirs approximately below Beijing. In 2014, an ultra-deep diamond found in Juína, Mato Grosso in western Brazil, contained inclusions of ringwoodite—the only known sample of natural terrestrial origin—thus providing evidence of significant amounts of water as hydroxide in the Earth's mantle.

== See also ==
- Ark
- Deluge
- Waterworld
- Flood myth
  - List of flood myths
  - Flood#Society and culture
- Doomsday event
- Greenhouse and icehouse Earth
