= The Execution Channel =

2007 novel by Ken MacLeod

First edition (publ. Orbit Books)

The Execution Channel is an alternate history science fiction novel by British writer Ken MacLeod, which focuses on the early decades of the 21st century. The military of the United States of America and some of its allies have conducted a war on terror for some time and additional terrorist acts have continued, including an unspecified one at Rosyth in Scotland. Divisions between ethnic groups have formed as a result. The Execution Channel was nominated for a British Science Fiction award in 2007, and for both the Campbell and Clarke Awards in 2008.

The novel takes its title from a mysterious TV channel that broadcasts state-sponsored executions.

== Plot ==
The novel follows the lives of software developer James Travis and his daughter Roisín. Roisín, a pacifist living at a peace camp outside RAF Leuchars, has witnessed and recorded the unloading of a strange device from an aircraft. She then receives a text-message from her brother Alec — who serves in the British Army in Central Asia — apparently warning her of impending trouble. As she and her fellow protestors leave the area, an enormous explosion devastates both the air-base and the neighbouring town.

She also witnesses an attack on Grangemouth Refinery.

Unknown to her, her father has been working as a spy. He witnesses the ethnic cleansing of Britain's Muslims and their migration to France. He also witnesses an attack on Spaghetti Junction.

Other characters include a blogger who specialises in conspiracy theories, Mark Dark; and his mother, Sandra Hope, who works at a camp for eco-refugees in the United States. Some other bloggers work for an intelligence agency, writing under various pseudonyms to spread disinformation.

In the novel's alternate universe, Al Gore won the 2000 presidential election over George W. Bush. He is reelected in 2004 and is succeeded by Hillary Clinton in 2008. However, the September 11, 2001 attacks still occurred, although they targeted Boston and Philadelphia rather than New York City and Washington D.C. MacLeod explains, "the point made...is that these matters are affected by more powerful forces than the personality of a particular president. In practice the Democratic Party leadership in Congress is just as committed to the war's continuation and possible extension as the Republicans. I didn't want the book to be read as just a fictional form of partisan 'Bush-bashing'."
