= Dissidence (novel) =

2016 science fiction novel by Ken MacLeod

- Author: Ken MacLeod
- Language: English
- Publication date: 2016

Dissidence is a 2016 science fiction novel by Ken MacLeod, the first book in a trilogy collectively called The Corporation Wars. The novel's main characters are far-left and far-right terrorists who have been resurrected in the far future (through mind uploading) and forced to put down an uprising by robots that have spontaneously developed sentience. Like MacLeod's other novels, Dissidence draws inspiration from real-life political currents, including accelerationism and neoreaction.

The novel was positively reviewed by The Scotsman and Locus Magazine.
