= The Restoration Game =

2010 novel by Ken MacLeod

- First edition
- Author: Ken MacLeod
- Genre: science fiction/techno-thriller novel
- Publisher: Orbit Books
- Publication date: 2010

The Restoration Game is a 2010 science fiction/techno-thriller novel by Ken MacLeod.

The novel's main character and narrator, Lucy Stone, a computer programmer, grew up in the fictional Caucasian Soviet republic of Krassnia and in 2008 works for a videogame company in Edinburgh. After Stone's mother, who once worked for the CIA, commissions her company to create an MMORPG based on Krassnian mythology, Stone becomes entangled in the region's politics and her own family history.

The story is set in the year 2008. MacLeod has said that he originally intended to set it in the near future, but the 2008 South Ossetia war made this impossible.

Reviews of the novel have generally been positive. Financial Times reviewer James Lovegrove writes that "Where his novel excels is in its depiction of the machinations used both by governments and families to coerce others into doing their bidding, and in its inquiry into the nature of reality."

The novel was nominated for the Prometheus Award.

== See also ==
- Simulated reality
