= Silver Screen (novel) =

1999 novel by Justina Robson

- First edition
- Author: Justina Robson
- Cover artist: Steve Stone
- Language: English
- Genre: Science fiction novel
- Publisher: Macmillan
- Publication date: 13 August 1999
- Publication place: United Kingdom
- Media type: Print (Paperback)
- Pages: 374
- ISBN: 0-333-75437-9
- OCLC: 42310207

Silver Screen is a science fiction novel by Justina Robson, first published by Macmillan in 1999. It features Anjuli O'Connell, employed as a psychologist to monitor an artificial intelligence named 901. She has a photographic memory and perfect recall. The story concerns events following the death of Roy Croft, Anjuli's colleague and friend. The book's themes include machine rights and evolution.
