= Dark Light (novel) =

2001 novel by Ken MacLeod

First edition (publ. Orbit Books) Cover artist: Lee Gibbons

Dark Light is a science fiction novel by Scottish writer Ken MacLeod, published in 2001. It is the second book in the Engines of Light Trilogy and a 2002 nominee for the Campbell Award.

The novel continues the plot from Cosmonaut Keep, but this time is set on the "Second Sphere", a number of clustered solar systems artificially seeded with intelligent life forms by a mysterious and transcendent alien species. Within this system, the main character, Matt Cairns, develops a form of interstellar travel and sets out to discover the motivation of the aliens.

== Literary significance and reception ==
Publishers Weekly had a mixed review for the novel saying:

This middle book in what will be at least a trilogy doesn't stand well on its own, so readers are advised to begin with Cosmonaut Keep. The novel features several interesting alien species, some fascinating speculations on the relationship between sex and gender, and MacLeod's trademark mix of radical socialist and libertarian politics. Both novels are worth reading but not quite up to the high mark established by his previous series, The Fall Revolution.
