= Justina Robson =

British writer

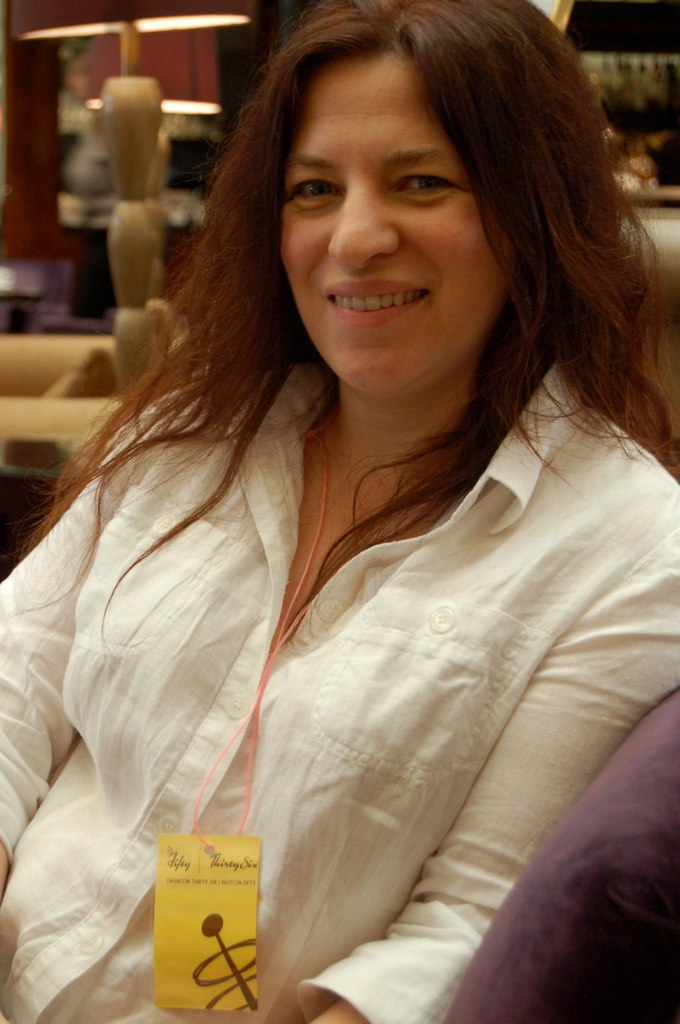
- Born: 11 June 1968 (age 58); Leeds, England
- Writing career
- Genre: Speculative fiction
- Notable work: Quantum Gravity Series
- Notable awards: Arthur C Clarke (nominee), BSFA (nominee), John W Campbell (nominee)

Justina Robson (born 11 June 1968 in Leeds, England) is a science fiction author from Leeds, England.

== Biography and publishing history ==
Justina Robson was born in Leeds on 11 June 1968, and studied philosophy and linguistics at the University of York. She worked in a variety of jobs – including secretary, technical writer, and fitness instructor – until becoming a full-time writer.

Robson attended the Clarion West Writing Workshop and was first published in 1994 in the British small press magazine The Third Alternative, but is best known as a novelist. Her debut novel Silver Screen was shortlisted for both the Arthur C Clarke Award and the BSFA Award in 2000. Her second novel, Mappa Mundi, was also shortlisted for the Arthur C Clarke Award in 2001. It won the 2000 Amazon.co.uk Writer's Bursary. In 2004, Natural History, Robson's third novel, was shortlisted for the BSFA Award, and came second in the John W Campbell Award.

Robson's novels have been noted for sharply-drawn characters, and an intelligent and deeply thought-out approach to the tropes of the genre. She has been described as "one of the very best of the new British hard SF writers".

Living Next-Door to the God of Love is a loose sequel to Natural History, inasmuch as it is set in the same universe. Keeping It Real marks the beginning of a series, the Quantum Gravity Books.

On 27 July 2008, she spoke on BBC Radio 3 about Doctor Who and various other science fiction shows for 25 minutes during the interval of the Doctor Who Prom.

Robson was announced in November 2008 as the guest of honour at the following year's Novacon.

Robson was announced in April 2010 as an international guest of honour at Swancon 36 to be held 21 to 25 April 2011 in Perth Australia.

Robson announced in November 2010 the forthcoming publication of her first story collection, Heliotrope, to be published in April 2011 by Australian independent publisher Ticonderoga Publications.

== Bibliography ==
=== Novels ===
Name	Published	ISBN	Notes
Silver Screen	London: Macmillan, 1999 (paper)	ISBN 0-333-75437-9	British Science Fiction Award nominee, 1999; Arthur C. Clarke Award nominee, 2000; Philip K. Dick Award nominee, 2005
Mappa Mundi	London: Macmillan, 2001 (paper)	ISBN 0-333-75438-7	Arthur C. Clarke Award nominee, 2002
Glorious Angels	London: Gollancz, March 2015	ISBN 978-0-575-13401-0	British Science Fiction Award nominee, 2015
The Switch	London: Gollancz, Mai 2018	ISBN 978-0-575-13407-2	

Natural History (Stuff Universe) series

Name	Published	ISBN	Notes
Natural History	London: Macmillan, 2003	ISBN 0-333-90745-0	British Science Fiction Award nominee, 2003; Campbell Award nominee, 2004; Philip K. Dick Award nominee, 2005
Living Next-Door to the God of Love	London: Macmillan, 2005	ISBN 1-4050-2116-0	British Science Fiction Award nominee, 2005; Philip K. Dick Award nominee, 2006; Campbell Award nominee, 2007

Quantum Gravity series

Name	Published	ISBN	Notes
Keeping It Real	London: Gollancz, 2006	ISBN 0-575-07861-8	
Selling Out	London: Gollancz, 2007	ISBN 0-575-07863-4	
Going Under	London: Gollancz, 2008	ISBN 0-575-07866-9	
Chasing the Dragon	London: Gollancz, August 2009	ISBN 978-1-59102-746-1	
Down to the Bone	London: Gollancz, January 2011	ISBN 978-0-575-08565-7	

Transformers Aligned Continuity family

Name	Published	ISBN	Notes
Transformers: The Covenant of Primus	47North, December 2013	ISBN 978-1477805992	Historical backdrop material

=== Story collection ===
Name	Published	ISBN	Notes
Heliotrope	Greenwood: Ticonderoga Publications, April 2011	ISBN 978-0-9807813-3-5	

== Literary universes ==
=== Natural History (Stuff) universe ===
Based on M-Theory, the Unity lives in all 11 dimensions and watches our 4 dimensions for individual intelligences to entice into the Unity aggregate. It reads mental attitudes, desires, and intentions and can alter 4-D reality by action in the other 7 dimensions. While a mind is never truly lost translating into Unity, its identity is soon subsumed into the collective.

About translation into Unity: "Nobody has died. They are all within, every life perfectly recorded, every experience distributed." "Translated individuals remain alive in the sense they are able to continue the natural process of consciousness." "the Translated were in a state of superposition, being both themselves and alive and conscious, but also unified with all other conscious beings within Unity." Physical bodies are gone from 4-D, but theoretically can be re-manifest as they were.

Stuff is Unity's manifestation in 4-D, appearing as an atomically undistinguishable mass that responds to intense thought and adapts itself to satisfy implicit need or desire. For example, Stuff appears as an instantaneous transfer FTL engine to a stranded inter-stellar ship, and transforms into a weapon needed by a scientist to defend himself against torture.

Physical contact with Stuff can bleed one's intellect into Unity, normally transferring consciousness into 7-D after several uses unless Unity agrees otherwise. Strong personalities with disciplined minds can resist longer, or minds can voluntary translate immediately. While Unity purports to be benevolent and respectful, it has arbitrarily translated million-plus sized groups of individuals.

Sidebar pocket realities have been negotiated with Unity, who manifests them in Stuff and moves 4-D people between them and mainline human reality. They are maintained by Unity created engines, similar to today's computer games which implement a rule based virtual reality. Sidebars include Metropolis (the DC Comics Justice League of America), Dindsenchas (historical Celtic), Sankhara (Buddhist Saṅkhāra).

An ancient galactic race boot-strapped itself into 11-D and Unity, leaving a mechanism built of stuff as two artificial moons around an earth-like planet. The continued existence/operation of these is probably essential to Unity. The Unity mechanism allows for multiple unconnected Unities, whose uncoordinated actions in 11-D can destroy the conditions that permit the existence of expanded 4-D space-times.

=== Quantum Gravity universe ===
Robson's Quantum Gravity series is set in a future Earth, also called Otopia, after a quantum bomb has opened connections between Earth and several other realities, including Alfheim, a realm of elves. The series mixes science fiction and fantasy elements, presenting a setting in which advanced technology, artificial intelligence, magic, elves, demons, and other nonhuman societies coexist.

The central character is Lila Black, a young security agent whose body has been rebuilt with cybernetic and artificial-intelligence enhancements after she was severely injured. In Keeping It Real, she is assigned to protect Zal, an elven rock musician, after threats against him expose conflicts between human and nonhuman cultures. Reviewers noted the series' combination of espionage, fantasy, cybernetics, and genre-crossing themes, including identity, sexuality, technology, and cultural conflict.
