= Simon Ings =

English writer

Simon Ings is an English novelist and science writer living in London. He was born in July 1965 in Horndean and educated at Churcher's College, Petersfield and at King's College London and Birkbeck College, London.

Ings has written a number of novels, short prose and articles for national newspapers. He was culture editor at New Scientist for a while and as of 2021 continues to write for the magazine on cultural subjects. His non-fiction book The Eye: A Natural History delved into the science of vision exploring the chemistry, physics and biology of the eye.

Ings has collaborated with M. John Harrison on short fiction including "The Dead" (1992) and "The Rio Brain". The latter was published as a separate booklet by Night Shade Books and was available only with the limited edition of Harrison's collection Things That Never Happen. He has also collaborated on short fiction with Charles Stross.

== Bibliography ==
=== Novels ===
- Hot Head, Grafton Books, 1992, ISBN 0-586-21496-8
- City of the Iron Fish, Collins, 1994, ISBN 0-00-647653-8
- Hotwire, Collins, 1995, ISBN 0-00-647724-0
- Headlong, HarperCollins, 1999, ISBN 0-00-647725-9
- Painkillers, Bloomsbury, 2000, ISBN 0-7475-4787-4
- The Weight of Numbers, Atlantic Books, 2006, ISBN 1-84354-463-6
- Dead Water, Corvus Books/Atlantic Books, 2010, ISBN 978-1-84887-888-4
- Wolves, Gollancz, 2014, ISBN 978-0-575-11973-4
- The Smoke, Orion, 2018, ISBN 978-0-575-12007-5

=== Non-fiction ===
- The Eye: A Natural History, Bloomsbury, 2007, ISBN 978-0-7475-7805-5
- A Natural History of Seeing, W. W. Norton, 2008, ISBN 978-0-393-06719-4
- Stalin and the Scientists: A History of Triumph and Tragedy 1905–1953, Faber & Faber, 2016, ISBN 978-0571290079

=== Selected short fiction ===
- "The Braining of Mother Lamprey" (1990)
- "The Black Lotus" (1993)
- "Grand Prix" (1993)
- "Volatile" (1995)
- "Open Veins" (1997)
- "Myxamatosis" (2000)
- "Ménage" (2001)
- "Russian Vine" (2001)
- "Myxomatosis" (2001)
- "Menage" (2001)
- "The Convert" (2002)
- "Elephant" (2003)
- "The Wedding Party" (2007)
- "Zoology" (2009)
