= For the Win =

2010 science fiction novel by Cory Doctorow

For The Win
- Author: Cory Doctorow
- Language: English
- Genre: Young adult
- Publisher: Tor Teen
- Publication date: 11 May 2010
- Publication place: United States
- Media type: Print (Hardback & Paperback) & e-book & unabridged audiobook
- Pages: 480 pp (Hardback edition)
- ISBN: 978-0-7653-2216-6 (Hardback edition)

For the Win is the second young adult science fiction novel by Canadian author Cory Doctorow. It was released in May 2010. The novel is available free on the author's website as a Creative Commons download, and is also published in traditional paper form by Tor Books.

The book is centered on massively multiplayer online role-playing games. Even though the novel is targeted toward young adults, it takes on significant concepts such as macroeconomics and labor rights. It covers the new and fast evolving concept of virtual economy. It also deals with MMORPG specific topics like gold farming and power-leveling.

== Plot ==
=== Part 1: The gamers and their games, the workers at their work ===
In the near future, virtual economies play a key role in geopolitics. These economies share a common virtual world known as "game-space", essentially a more evolved form of the Internet with no borders or separate countries. However, in game-space, income inequality is staggeringly high and exacerbated by the exploitative practices of robber baron-type figures, including Boss Wing and Mr Banerjee.

Matthew Fong lives in Shenzhen, China. He uses his talents at gold-farming to find the optimal way to earn virtual gold in a dungeon in minimal time. Together with a couple of friends and roommates, they leave their greedy employer Boss Wing, a virtual economy kingpin who steals their profits. Matthew finds a place in the fictional MMORPG Svartalfaheim Warriors where it is possible to earn much more gold in a short time, and exploits this to make a month's living in a single night, before the administrators of the game discover and block him. However, Boss Wing sends his goons to raid Matthew's home and beat him up to lure him back; they agree that Matthew can work on his own but has to surrender 60% of his income to Boss Wing, who handles turning game-gold into real money for him in turn.

Leonard Goldberg is a wealthy American boy in Los Angeles. His father built up a big shipping company, but Leonard is mostly interested in playing games with his guilds in China. He teaches himself Mandarin and takes on the pseudonym "Wei-Dong" (meaning "strength of the East"). His team mentors other Angelenos in leveling up their avatars for money in another game, Savage Wonderland. After one customer makes a series of missteps, they nearly fail but Wei-Dong is able to save them with luck. His stern, disapproving father discovers him playing at night due to time differences and decides to send his son off to a boarding school, Martindale Academy, for better discipline. On the way there, they get into a car accident and amidst the confusion, Wei-Dong manages to run away to Santee Alley, where he rents a cheap room and starts to live on his own, making money as Mechanical Turk, a player who slips into NPCs when other players trigger something not implemented in the game's AI. While he barely earns enough to make a living, Wei-Dong enjoys his newfound freedom playing for Coca-Cola Games, a huge subsidiary of The Coca-Cola Company that runs some of the biggest virtual worlds.

Mala moves with her mother and little brother from a small village in India to Mumbai, where her mother hopes to earn a better living. She ends up in a plastic recycling factory in Dharavi. With her friend Yasmin Gardez, Mala plays a game called Zombie Mecha in Mrs Dibyendu's internet cafe for fun after school, but her mastery of tactics and leadership skills quickly attract a huge following who call her General Robotwallah. Soon, she is approached by Mr Banerjee, who recruits her to attack his business rivals in the game, allowing her family to leave the factory and make a better living. One day, her army gets defeated by a mysterious army; their charismatic leader identifies herself to Mala as "Big Sister Nor". Nor tells her that they are trying to recruit and organize game-workers all over the world into the IWWWW (Industrial Workers of the World Wide Web, a pun on IWW). The members of the IWWWW similarly call themselves "Webblies", a pun on Wobblies and the web. While companies may move their production from one country to another whenever powerful unions arise, because no borders or separate countries exist in game-space, there will always be a chance to reach the replacement workers and have them join the union, too. Mala dismisses the idea at first, however, and begins to believe the Webblies are sabotaging her career.

=== Part 2: Hard work at play ===
Connor Prikkel, a PhD student in economics at Stanford University, develops a mathematical model for predicting values of virtual goods in games based on how much fun the game is. With this discovery (which he calls "Prikkel equations"), he quits his studies and begins speculating on in-game items. Eventually, he makes big wins, and his equations and understanding of the game economies earn him the leader's post in Coca-Cola Games' Command Central.

Boss Wing locks in his employees at his main office after one of the boys discovers a new way to earn gold quickly. Angered at this lock-in, the boys in Shenzhen go on a wildcat strike, breaking out of the internet cafes, cutting their network connections and protesting in the street out front. Big Sister Nor supports them together with her two co-organizers, The Mighty Krang and Justbob. They talk to the media and spread the word about the strike to all the other Webblies. In addition, the Webblies extend the strike to the online worlds of Mushroom Kingdom, where they use their game characters to fend off Boss Wing's replacement players attempting to earn gold in-game. Boss Wing retaliates with corrupt virtual detectives known as Pinkerton players, and the Webblies and Pinkerton players fight a huge virtual battle. Conner and his colleagues look on in interest (and even bet on the battle outcome), until they eventually block all the involved player accounts.

During the fight, a group of hired bullies attack Nor's hide-out and inflict serious injuries. Shenzhen police raid the strikers and arrest Matthew. He is sent to a labour camp for three months, while one of his co-workers, Lu, manages to escape. He briefly talks to Wei-Dong, one of his guildies in gamespace, and learns that videos of the strike and subsequent police raid are going viral in game-space and in Los Angeles. At Shenzhen railway station, Lu is recognized as one of the strikers by Jiandi, a girl who broadcasts a dissident Internet radio show centered around advice on labor organizing, with a huge following of millions of Chinese factory girls. Massive revenues from her show's advertisements for other illegal movements, including Falun Gong, allow her to stay ahead of the police and escape arrest. She takes Lu into her custody, interviews him on her show, and they initiate a romantic relationship and travel the country together.

While Mala harbors antipathy toward the Webblies, Yasmin joins them and gets expelled from Mala's army. Yasmin is recruited by Ashok Balgangadhar Tilak, an economist in Mumbai working on behalf of the Webblies. They go together to Andheri, where Ashok has scheduled a meeting with Indian union leaders. He hopes to win their support for the Webblies, and Yasmin tells them about their work as gold-farmers and gamers. However, the "old guard" of union leaders do not take them seriously and decline to provide money or other support. When they arrive back in Dharavi, Mala and her army are already waiting to attack them. Mala attempts to use a petrol bomb, but Yasmin manages to bring her down and wound her, bringing the old friends together again. Yasmin convinces Mala and her army to declare their support for the Webblies, but they secretly continue to work as double-agents for Mr Banerjee.

Upon Wei-Dong's eighteenth birthday, he resumes contact with his mother. She tells him that his father is dying in the hospital. Wei-Dong decides to come home and visit him, only to arrive too late. From then on, he moves back in with his mother, and becomes part-owner of their shipping company.

=== Part 3: Ponzi ===
Wei-Dong comes into contact with the Webblies, and, partly out of his desire for adventure, helps them. Abusing his position as part-owner of his family's shipping company, he modifies a shipping container into a makeshift flat and smuggles himself into China, along with boxes of prepaid cards for games valid on servers in the United States, so the Webblies can then distribute and use the codes for their online activities.

After three months in the labour camp, Matthew is released. He rejoins Lu and Jiandi in Shenzhen, along with Wei-Dong, who has successfully distributed his smuggled prepaid cards. Jiandi agrees to house more and more Webblies in her spare flats, motivating her to continue with her broadcasts. This attracts police suspicion, however, and one night, they raid her residence. Jiandi and Lu flee via a secret exit, while all the Webblies are arrested at the front door. Wei-Dong follows Jiandi and Lu, but while Jiandi and Wei-Dong escape the police, Lu is shot. The rest of the boys are also shot after being arrested.

As their "chief economist", Ashok (working at the backroom of Mrs Dibyendu's cafe) devises a plan to destabilize the in-game economies. There are multiple references to Ponzi schemes in the plot, but it is not entirely clear how the plan works. One day, Ashok, Mala and her army find the cafe locked and Mrs Dibyendu gone. They are ambushed by a gang hired by Mr Banerjee; but Mala and her group drive them off. When Mr Banerjee returns with more thugs, Ashok and Mala finally persuades the union leaders to side with them, allowing them to defend themselves and keep the cafe to continue their work.

Eventually, Ashok and the Webblies are able to set up a virtual doomsday device of bad financial assets based on game values. With that power in their hands, the Webblies blackmail Connor and his colleagues by demanding Coca-Cola Games give their workers more freedom to farm gold and sell it to players, in exchange for sparing the game economies. With their extensive inside knowledge, Connor and his employees reluctantly accept the Webblies' proposal and work together with Ashok on re-stabilizing the game economy. Mala gets kidnapped by Banerjee, who refuses to set her free even after Yasmin pays him ransom. Ashok and Connor tamper with his in-game assets, getting Banerjee to finally release Mala.

Police in Hong Kong raid Big Sister Nor's house, only to find that she had already moved to an apartment above a massage parlor to continue her work. One night afterwards, arsonists attack the massage parlor. The Mighty Krang and Justbob escape, but Big Sister Nor dies in the fire. Krang and Justbob hear this and tell the other Webblies about the fire, revealing that Nor's last words were "You all lead yourselves", giving them new hope as their unionization efforts spread to more countries.

Wei-Dong, Jiandi, and their teams decide to flee China aboard another of Wei-Dong's ships. They meet with Ashok, Yasmin, and Mala in Mumbai and see each other face to face for the first time. Connor surprises them by revealing his defection, having used his security department to hack their accounts and find their location. The book ends with the protagonists resolving to figure out what to do next.

== Reception ==
Reception of the novel has been mixed; some reviews praised its righteous message, but others said that this didacticism may detract from the novel for those who are not interested. One review from Kirkus praised the novel's coverage of social issues: "His story spans the globe and exposes levels of exploitation running from Ponzi schemes to sweatshop thuggery." However, the same publication also criticized the novel's moralizing, explaining that "it is shot through with economics lectures; regularly, the focus shifts from the large cast of characters to a gentle exposition on union history or social contracts or some other complex economic idea. Fans, future bankers and future gametechs will be in heaven; those without interest will skim or give up by the halfway mark."

== See also ==
- Digital sweatshop
