= Headlong (Ings novel) =

1999 book by Simon Ings

- Author: Simon Ings
- Cover artist: Jacey (Jason Cook)
- Language: English
- Genre: Science fiction novel
- Publisher: HarperCollins Voyager
- Publication date: 1999
- Publication place: United Kingdom
- Pages: 335 pp
- ISBN: 0-00-647725-9
- OCLC: 43881297

Headlong is a 1999 science fiction novel by English author Simon Ings. It is Ings's fourth novel and depicts the struggle of a man trying to find his humanity after his previously enhanced senses have been removed. A review of the novel in New Scientist praised it as "mature and thoughtful".

== Plot summary ==
Headlong is set England in the mid-21st century. There has been a civil war and reconstruction after a period of corporate excess. Advances in nanoelectronics and robotics have led to the hybridization of human and artificial intelligence (AI). These expensive interfaces have only been installed on a few architects to facilitate their direction of nanobots that are constructing beautiful cities on the Moon. However, a few years before the novel begins, the AIs take over the Moon and precipitate an economic collapse on Earth by subtle market manipulations.

The novel's posthuman protagonist Christopher Yale and his wife Joanne have enhanced senses and are telepathically linked. Christopher has lived on the Moon for years. When his interfaces are removed following the economic collapse, he struggles with Epistemic Appetite Imbalance (EAI), a disorder precipitated by the loss of his enhanced senses. Christopher and his wife divorce, and she is killed a few months later. Christopher is pursued by both his wife's murderers and the police.
