= Juliet E. McKenna =

British author (born 1965)

Juliet McKenna
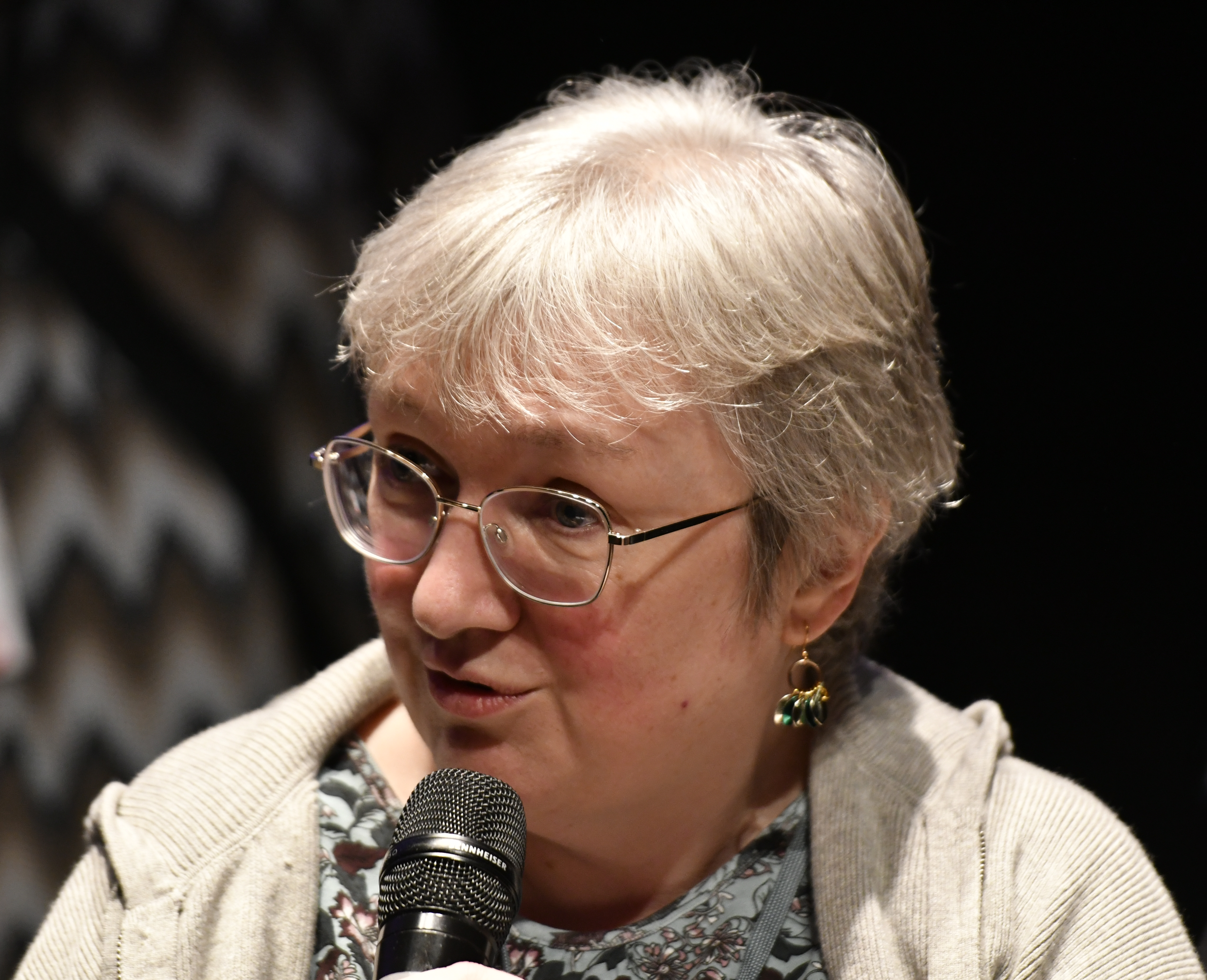
- Juliet E. McKenna at Swecon in Stockholm, 2024.
- Born: 1965 (age 60–61); Lincolnshire, England
- Occupation: Author
- Writing career
- Pen name: Juliet E. McKenna; J. M. Alvey
- Period: 1999–
- Genres: Fantasy; Historical murder mysteries
- Notable awards: Karl Edward Wagner Award; BSFA Award
- Website: www.julietemckenna.com

Juliet E. McKenna (pen name, J. M. Alvey; born 1965) is a British fantasy author. Her novels mostly form part of series, five series as of 2022. She is a Karl Edward Wagner Award and BSFA Award laureate.

== Early life and education ==
McKenna was born in Lincolnshire in 1965, and studied Greek and Roman history and literature at St Hilda's College, Oxford.

== Career ==
After college McKenna had a career in personnel management before changing to work in book-selling. She also fitted in becoming a mother around her writing. McKenna is one of the British boom of fantasy writers.

McKenna also writes historical murder mysteries as 'J. M. Alvey'.

As well as her various novel series, McKenna writes articles and reviews for magazines. She has worked as a judge for various awards such as the Arthur C. Clarke Award in 2013, the 2011 James White Award and the World Fantasy Awards in 2018. McKenna is also a contributing editor for the Irish anthology magazine Albedo One. In 2013 McKenna was the chair of the British National Science Fiction Convention, EightSquaredCon. She was also one of the authors, along with others such as Sarah Ash and Mark Chadbourn, behind The Write Fantastic, which was an initiative by a group of fantasy authors to promote the fantasy genre, and to display the scope of current fantasy writing.

McKenna joined forces with a group of micro business owners to form EU VAT ACTION to resolve the VAT issue caused by the EU VAT regulations which came into force on 1 January 2015. She spent considerable time working with businesses and experts in the UK and EU to create a way that small businesses online could work with the VAT regulations.

She regularly attends fantasy conventions and hosted FantasyCon 2015's awards night, gives talks, and teaches creative writing courses.

== Critical reception ==
Financial Times reviewer James Lovegrove described McKenna's 2012 She-who-thinks-for-herself, as "a cunning, funny... feminist rewrite" of H. Rider Haggard's She: A History of Adventure.

== Personal life ==
McKenna is married, with two sons. She lives with her husband in Oxfordshire.

== Awards ==
- Karl Edward Wagner Award for special achievement (2015)
- BSFA Award shortlist for best non-fiction (2017) for The Myth of Meritocracy and the Reality of the Leaky Pipe and Other Obstacles in Science Fiction & Fantasy
- British Fantasy Award shortlist for best fantasy novel (2019) for The Green Man's Heir
- BSFA Award shortlist for best novel (2021) for The Green Man's Challenge
- BSFA Award winner for best novel (2023) for The Green Man's Quarry

== Bibliography ==
=== Novels ===
==== The Tales of Einarinn ====
1. The Thief's Gamble (1999)
2. The Swordsman's Oath (1999)
3. The Gambler's Fortune (2000)
4. The Warrior's Bond (2001)
5. The Assassin's Edge (2002)

==== The Aldabreshin Compass ====
1. Southern Fire (2003)
2. Northern Storm (2004)
3. Western Shore (2005)
4. Eastern Tide (2006)

==== The Chronicles of the Lescari Revolution ====
1. Irons in the Fire (2009)
2. Blood in the Water (2010)
3. Banners in the Wind (2010)

==== The Hadrumal Crisis ====
1. Dangerous Waters (2011)
2. Darkening Skies (2012)
3. Defiant Peaks (2012)

==== The Green Man ====
1. The Green Man's Heir (2018)
2. The Green Man's Foe (2019)
3. The Green Man's Silence (2020)
4. The Green Man's Challenge (2021)
5. The Green Man's Gift (2022)
6. The Green Man's Quarry (2023)
7. The Green Man's War (2024)
8. The Green Man's Holiday (2025)

==== Standalone novels ====
- Shadow Histories of the River Kingdom (2016)
- The Cleaving (2023)

==== As J. M. Alvey ====
- Shadows of Athens (2020)
- Scorpions in Corinth (2020)
- Justice for Athena (2020)

=== Other fiction ===
==== Short stories ====
1. Losing Track of Time (2003) (a Big Finish Short Trips story)
2. Urban Renewal (2006)
3. Identify Theft (2006)
4. Now You See Him, Now You Don't (2006)
5. The Wizard's Coming (2007) (in The Solaris Book of New Fantasy)
6. Walking Shadows (2008)
7. Noble Deceit (2008)
8. Is This My Last Testament? (2008)
9. Patience: A Womanly Virtue (2009)
10. Reflections (2010)
11. Fear Itself (2010)
12. The Grand Tour (2010)
13. An Unforeseen Legacy (2010)
14. The Wisdom of the Ages (2011) (in Voices from the Past)
15. She-who-thinks-for-herself (2012) (in Resurrection Engines: Sixteen Extraordinary Tales of Scientific Romance)
16. Remembrance (2010)
17. An Unforeseen Legacy (2011)
18. Game, Set and Match (2013)
19. The Legend of the Eagle (2013)
20. The Ties That Bind (2013)
21. Do You Want to Believe in Magic? (2014)
22. Coins, Fights and Stories Always (2015)
23. Notes and Queries (2015)
24. Truth, Lies and Consequences (2015)
25. A Warning Shiver (2016)
26. Speak Softly and Carry a Big Stick (2016)
27. The Sphere (2016)
28. Through the Veils/Trace Elements (2016)
29. A Constant Companion (2017)
30. The Road to Hadrumal (2017)
31. The Unforeseen Path (2018)
32. Wanderlust (2018)
33. The Echoes of a Shot (2019)
34. The Hand that Rocks the Cradle (2019)
35. Taking Note (2020)
36. Old Gods, New Tricks (2021)
37. The Golden Rule (2022)
38. The End of the Road (2023)

==== Short fiction featuring characters from The Tales of Einarinn ====
1. The Tormalin Necklace (2001)
2. The Wedding Gift (2003) (illustrated)
3. Turns and Chances (2004) (novella)
4. Win Some, Lose Some (2005)
5. A Spark in the Darkness (2006)
6. A Few Further Tales of Einnarin (2012) (electronic publication collecting "The Wedding Gift", "Win Some, Lose Some", "A Spark in the Darkness", "Absent Friends", "Why the Pied Crow Always Sounds Disappointed" [which had originally been published as The Tormalin Necklace] and the illustrations from "The Wedding Gift")
