= Liz Williams =

English science fiction writer

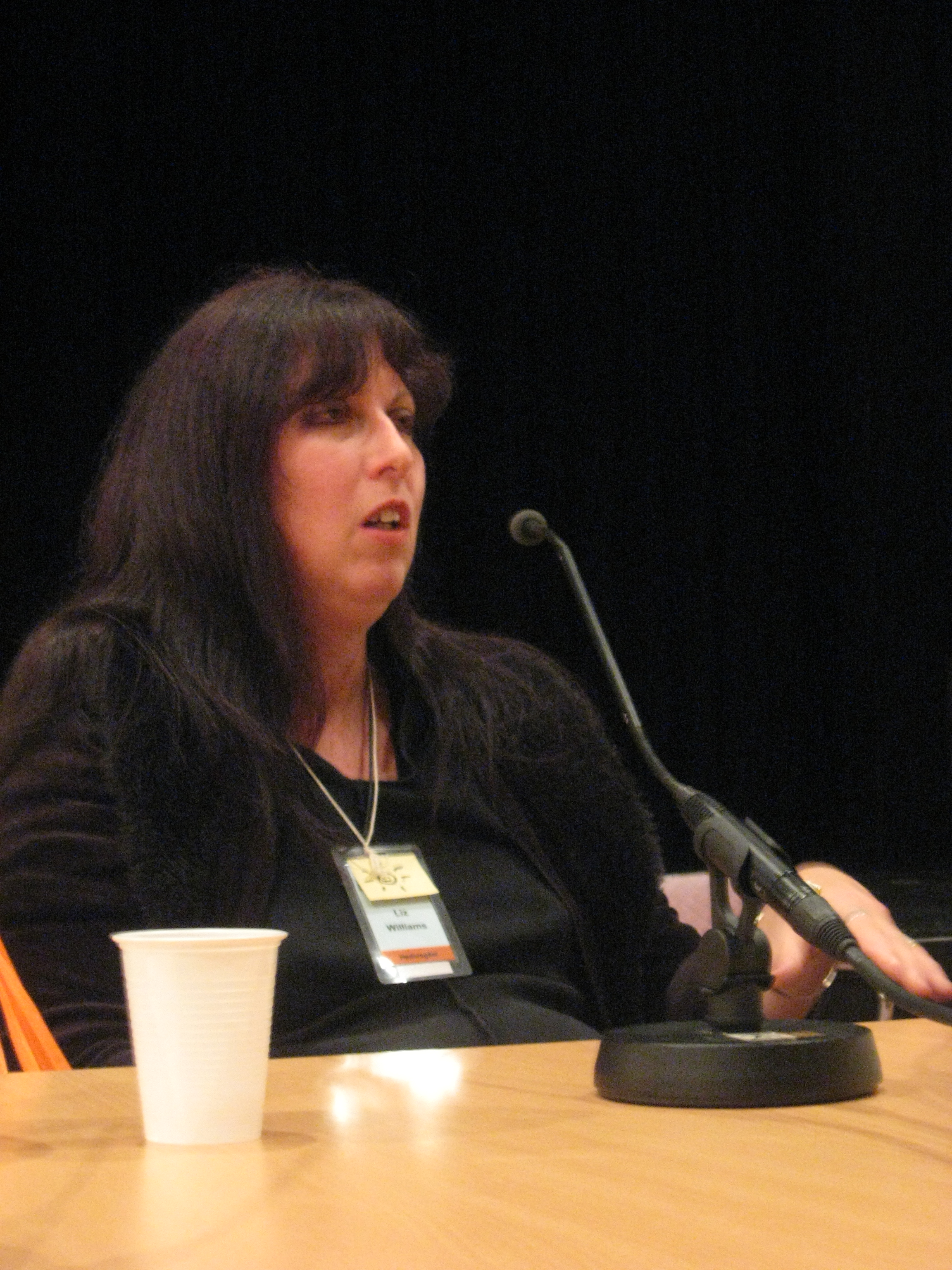
- Born: February 26, 1965 (age 61); Gloucester, England
- Occupation: Novelist
- Writing career
- Genres: Science fiction and fantasy

Liz Williams (born 1965) is a British science fiction writer, historian and occultist. The Ghost Sister, her first novel, was published in 2001. Both this novel and her next, Empire of Bones (2002) were nominated for the Philip K. Dick Award. She is also the author of the Inspector Chen series.

Williams is the daughter of a stage magician and a Gothic novelist. She holds a PhD in Philosophy of Science from Cambridge (for which her supervisor was Peter Lipton). She has had short stories published in Asimov's, Interzone, The Third Alternative and Visionary Tongue. From the mid-nineties until 2000, she lived and worked in Kazakhstan. Her experiences there are reflected in her 2003 novel Nine Layers of Sky. This novel brings into the modern era the Bogatyr Ilya Muromets and Manas the hero of the Epic of Manas. Her novels have been published in the US and the UK, while her third novel The Poison Master (2003) has been translated into Dutch.

Williams practices modern Druidry and co-owns a pagan and esoteric store in Glastonbury. In 2020, she published a popular history book about modern paganism in the United Kingdom, Miracles of Our Own Making.

== Bibliography ==
=== Novels ===
- The Ghost Sister (June 2001) - Philip K. Dick Award nominee
- Empire of Bones (March 2002) - Philip K. Dick Award nominee
- The Poison Master (January 2003)
- Nine Layers of Sky (August 2003)
- Worldsoul (June 2012)

Banner of Souls

- Banner of Souls (September 2004) - Shortlisted for the 20th Arthur C. Clarke Award, Philip K. Dick Award nominee
- Winterstrike (September 2008)
- Phosphorus (February 2018)

The Fallow Sisters

- Comet Weather (2020)
- Blackthorn Winter (January 2021)
- Embertide (October 2023)
- Salt on the Midnight Fire (June 2024)

Darkland

- Darkland (February 2006)
- Bloodmind (February 2007)

Detective Inspector Chen

- Snake Agent (September 2005) - Published in French as La traite des âmes (2014)
- The Demon and the City (August 2006)
- Precious Dragon (June 2007)
- The Shadow Pavilion (August 2009)
- The Iron Khan (December 2010)
- Morningstar (January 2015, self-published)

=== Short fiction ===
Collections

- The Banquet of the Lords of Night and Other Stories (2004)
- A Glass of Shadow (2011)
- Vodyanoy/Loosestrife (2015)
- The Light Warden (2015)

Stories (Note: Short stories unless otherwise noted.)

Title	Year	First published	Reprinted/collected	Notes
Tycho and the Stargazer	2003	Asimov's Science Fiction Vol 27, No 12		
Out of Scarlight	2013	Old Mars (anthology)		
The marriage of the sea	2015	Williams, Liz (April–May 2015). "The marriage of the sea". Asimov's Science Fiction. 39 (4–5): 79–82.		

=== Nonfiction ===
- Miracles of Our Own Making (2020)
- Modern Handfasting (2021)

Diary of a Witchcraft Shop (with Trevor Jones)

- Diary of a Witchcraft Shop (2011)
- Diary of a Witchcraft Shop 2 (2013)

———————
