= Helen Hart (author) =

British children's writer

- Occupation: Writer
- Writing career
- Pen name: Maya Snow, Sebastian Rook
- Language: English
- Years active: 1999–present
- Genres: Children's literature, Young Adult fiction
- Notable works: Sisters of the Sword series, The Black Banner, Vampire Plagues series

Helen Hart is a British children's writer best known for writing under the pseudonym Maya Snow.

== Career ==
Hart has been a published author since 1999, predominantly under pseudonyms, and has been published by Scholastic, Virgin Books, OUP and HarperCollins. Her work has been translated into many languages including Swedish, Danish, Japanese and Greek.

Hart is one of the founding partners of the self-publishing consultancy, SilverWood Books. She is the co-founder of the 'Get Published Masterclass' in Bristol and was a judge for the Bristol Short Story Prize in 2010 and 2011.

== Works ==
- Vampire Plagues series as Sebastian Rook
  - Book 4: Outbreak (Scholastic) 2005, ISBN 9781407117232
  - Book 5: Epidemic (Scholastic) 2005, ISBN 9781407117225
  - Book 6: Extermination (Scholastic) 2006, ISBN 9781407117218
- Sisters of the Sword Series as Maya Snow
  - Sisters of the Sword. HarperCollins. 6 October 2009. ISBN 978-0-06-198563-8.
  - Sisters of the Sword 2: Chasing the Secret. HarperCollins. 27 January 2009. ISBN 978-0-06-124390-5.
  - Sisters of the Sword 3: Journey Through Fire. HarperCollins. 9 June 2009. ISBN 978-0-06-191999-2.
  - Sisters of the Sword 4: The Battle Dawns, HarperCollins, 2010, ISBN 9780061244032
- The Black Banner as Helen Hart (SilverWood Originals) 2011, ISBN 9781906236465
