= Colin Harvey (writer) =

British science fiction writer, editor, and reviewer

- Born: 11 November 1960; Cornwall, England
- Died: 15 August 2011 (aged 50)
- Citizenship: United Kingdom
- Education: Bath Spa University
- Spouse: Katie Harvey
- Writing career
- Period: 2001–2011
- Genre: Science fiction
- Website: www.colin-harvey.com

Colin Harvey (11 November 1960 – 15 August 2011) was a British science fiction writer, editor, and reviewer. He published six novels and more than 30 short stories.

== Life and career ==
Harvey was born in 1960 Cornwall, England, and later lived between Bristol and Bath. After working on a kibbutz and at a night shelter in the Midlands, Harvey was employed for two decades by Unilever. While at Unilever he helped launch Ben & Jerry's ice cream in Iceland.

He reviewed genre fiction for a number of publications, including Strange Horizons. His short fiction was published in magazines such as Interzone, Daily Science Fiction, Apex Magazine, and Albedo One along with different anthologies. In 2007, he became a freelance writer, with his novels released by Swimming Kangaroo Books and Angry Robot. In reference to his fiction, Harvey noted that "Nothing apart from fantasy and sf really interests me enough to write about it ... that's probably because to a large extent we're living sf."

Harvey edited Killers: An Anthology, released in 2008 by Swimming Kangaroo Books. The anthology focused on "speculative mystery" by "crossing crime fiction with science fiction, fantasy, and horror."

He died in 2011 a day after suffering a massive stroke.

== Critical reception ==
Harvey's novel Lightning Days was called a mix of "Raymond Feist's Riftwars crossed with Stephen Baxter's love of large timescales" while Winter Song was described as "a novel about many things, not least the shape and form a culture will revert to when the hard times come, and to what extent both individual and communal freedoms are lost as a result." The Guardian also praised Winter Song, saying in the novel "Harvey paints a grimly convincing portrait of a subsistence existence on the inhospitable world."

== Awards ==
Harvey was nominated for both the British Fantasy Award and the Black Quill Award for editing the anthology Killers.

== Bibliography ==
=== Novels ===
- Vengeance (2001)
- Lightning Days (2006)
- The Silk Palace (2007)
- Blind Faith (2008)
- Winter Song (2009)
- Damage Time (2010)

=== Collections ===
Most of Harvey's short works are found in the 2009 collection Displacement.

=== Anthologies ===
Harvey edited four anthologies:

- Killers (2008)
- Future Bristol (2009)
- Dark Spires (2010)
- Transtories (2011)
