= Cat in a box =

Cat in a box or cat in the box may refer to:

- Schrödinger's cat, a thought experiment concerning quantum superposition

== Film and television ==
- Cat in the Box, a 1993 unreleased film by Valeria Golino
- "Cat in the Box", an episode of the television series You Me Her
- "Cat in the Box", an episode of the television series Super Wings

== Literature ==
- "Cat in a Box", a short story by Gareth L. Powell in his 2008 short story collection The Last Reef and Other Stories
- The Cat in the Box, a 2019 book by Chris Ferrie

== Music ==
- "Cat in a Box", a song by Morningwood from their 2009 album Diamonds & Studs
- "Cat in the Box", a 2015 parody song of "Man in the Box" by Chris Senter

== Games ==
- Cat in a Box Games, the Canadian video game developer and publisher of Blue Defense
- Cat in the Box, a 2020 trick-taking card game

== See also ==
- Letting the cat out of the bag, a colloquialism that means to reveal facts previously hidden
- Maru (cat), a cat who became popular for squeezing into small boxes
