= 2022 in science fiction =

In 2022, the following events occurred in science fiction.

== Events ==
- 1 to 5 September – 80th World Science Fiction Convention was held in Chicago, United States.
- 25 October – 47th Saturn Awards was held in Los Angeles, United States.

== Deaths ==
- 5 January – John J. Miller, American author (born 1954)
- 13 January – Rick Cook, American author (born 1944)
- 14 January – Ron Goulart, American historian and author (born 1933)
- 18 April – Valerio Evangelisti, Italian author (born 1952)
- 16 July – Herbert W. Franke, Austrian scientist and author (born 1927)
- 17 July – Eric Flint, American author (born 1947)
- 26 July – Felix Thijssen, Dutch author (born 1933)
- 21 August – Alexei Panshin, American author (born 1940)
- 24 September – Chandler Davis, American-Canadian mathematician and author (born 1926)
- 19 November – Greg Bear, American author (born 1951)
- 30 November – Ray Nelson, American author (born 1931)

== Literary releases ==
=== Novels ===
- Dreams Bigger Than Heartbreak by Charlie Jane Anders
- Goliath by Tochi Onyebuchi
- Nona the Ninth by Tamsyn Muir
- RCE - Remote Code Execution by Sibylle Berg
- Stars and Bones by Gareth L. Powell
- Station Eternity by Mur Lafferty
- The Kaiju Preservation Society by John Scalzi
- Upgrade by Blake Crouch

== Films ==
=== Original ===
- Alienoid
- Attack: Part 1
- Bigbug
- Captain
- Chariot
- Corrective Measures
- Crimes of the Future
- Dual
- Everything Everywhere All at Once
- Expired
- Firestarter
- I'm Totally Fine
- Linoleum
- LOLA
- M3GAN
- MEAD
- Monolith
- Moonfall
- Moonshot
- Morbius
- Naai Sekar
- Nope
- Ordinary Failures
- Petrópolis
- Phi 1.618
- Relax, I'm from the Future
- Samaritan
- Significant Other
- Slash/Back
- Something in the Dirt
- Spiderhead
- Strange World
- TeraStorm
- The Adam Project
- The Hunteress
- The In Between
- The Legend
- The Orbital Children
- The Ordinaries
- The Other Shape
- The Time Capsule
- Timescape
- Vesper
- Viking
- Warriors of Future
- We Are Not Alone

=== Sequels, spin-offs and remakes ===
- 2025 Armageddon
- Avatar: The Way of Water
- Black Adam
- Black Panther: Wakanda Forever
- Boonie Bears: Back to Earth
- Dobaaraa
- Doctor Strange in the Multiverse of Madness
- Jurassic World Dominion
- Kids vs. Aliens
- Koogle Kuttappa
- Lightyear
- Moon Man
- Prey
- Shin Ultraman
- Sonic the Hedgehog 2
- Thor: Love and Thunder

== Television ==
=== New series ===
- Andor
- Baymax!
- Farzar
- From
- Halo
- I Am Groot
- Into the Deep
- Kindred
- Life After Life
- Moonhaven
- Night Sky
- Obi-Wan Kenobi
- Outer Range
- Pantheon
- Paper Girls
- Quantum Leap
- Raised by Wolves
- Salvage Marines
- Saving Me
- Severance
- She-Hulk: Attorney at Law
- Silverpoint
- Star Trek: Strange New Worlds
- Tales of the Jedi
- The Imperfects
- The Last Bus
- The Lazarus Project
- The Man Who Fell to Earth
- The Midwich Cuckoos
- The Peripheral
- The Time Traveler's Wife
- Transformers: BotBots
- Transformers: EarthSpark

=== Returning series ===
- Avenue 5, season 2
- Doctor Who, specials
- Doom Patrol, season 2
- For All Mankind, season 3
- Jurassic World Camp Cretaceous, season 5 and specials
- Kid Cosmic, season 3
- La Brea, season 2
- Love, Death & Robots, season 3
- Made for Love, season 2
- Mystery Science Theater 3000
- Nova Jones, series 2
- Paradise, season 2
- Power Rangers Dino Fury, season 2
- Raising Dion, season 2
- Resident Alien, season 2
- Rick and Morty, season 6
- Roswell, New Mexico, season 4
- See, season 3
- Solar Opposites, season 3
- Star Trek: Lower Decks, season 3
- Star Trek: Picard, season 2
- Stranger Things, season 4
- The Orville, season 3
- The Umbrella Academy, season 3
- Titans, season 4
- UFOs, season 2
- Upload, season 2
- Westworld, season 4

== Video games ==
- Anonymous;Code
- Citizen Sleeper
- Iron Lung
- Scorn
- The Callisto Protocol
- The Last of Us Part I

Preceded by 2021	2022	Succeeded by 2023
