= Cat in the Box =

Trick-taking card game

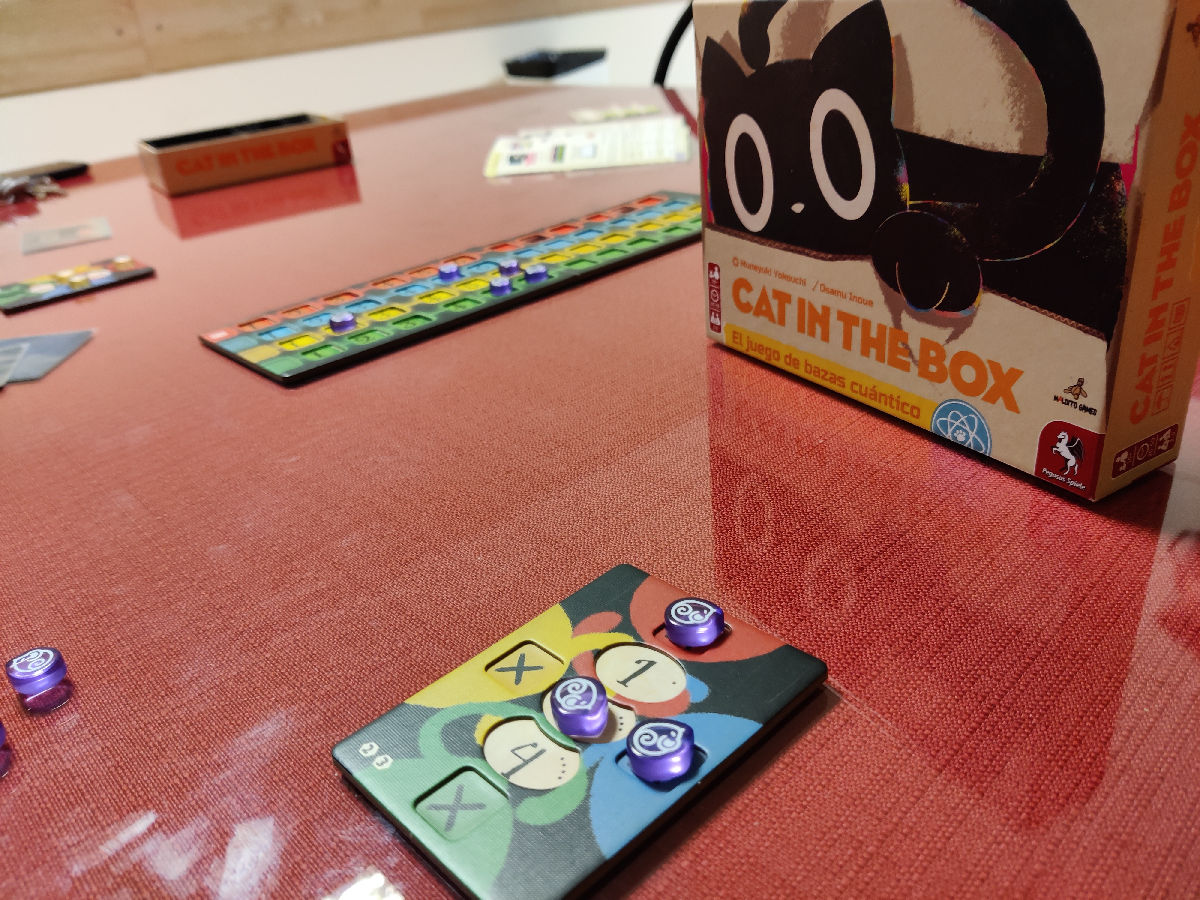
- Other names: Cat in the Box: Deluxe Edition
- Designers: Muneyuki Yokouchi (横内宗幸)
- Illustrators: Osamu Inoue (井上磨)
- Publishers: Ayatsurare Ningyoukan; Hobby Japan; Bézier Games
- Publication: 2020; 6 years ago (1st ed.); 2022; 4 years ago (2nd ed.)
- Genres: Card game; Trick-taking game
- Players: 3–4 (1st ed.); 2–5 (2nd ed.)
- Playing time: 20–40 minutes
- Age range: 13+

Cat in the Box, is a trick-taking card game designed by Muneyuki Yokouchi (横内宗幸) and published by Ayatsurare Ningyoukan (操られ人形館) in 2020 based on the Schrödinger's cat thought experiment. A second edition, Cat in the Box: Deluxe Edition was released by Hobby Japan and Bézier Games in 2022.

== Publishing history ==
Cat in the Box was announced at Game Market in 2020 and released in Japan by Ayatsurare Ningyoukan later that year for 3–4 players. A second edition, Cat in the Box: Deluxe Edition, for 2–5 players was released by Hobby Japan in July 2022 with updated game artwork and rules. This edition was also released in English by Bézier Games in August 2022. Bézier Games released a Kickstarter for Colossal Cat in the Box, an edition where all game pieces are four times larger than the base game, which was funded, and published in 2024.

== Gameplay ==
Cat in the Box is played using a deck of cat cards labelled 1–9, where the number of copies of each type is determined by number of players to a maximum of 45 cards. Each player begins with a player board with four colours on it (red, yellow, green, blue) and a set of player tokens; player tokens are placed on each of the coloured spaces on the player boards at the stat of the game. A research board with four coloured rows of spaces labelled from 1–9 is placed in between all players.

The number of players is the number of rounds the game is played over, with each round consisting of three phases: Preparation, Trick, and Scoring. In the Preparation phase, all cards are re-shuffled and dealt evenly between all players. Each player simultaneously plays a card face down from their hand, then, going in a clockwise order, predicts the number of tricks they will win during the round by placing a token on the corresponding number on their player board. In the Trick phase, each player plays a cat card from their hand in a clockwise order and declares what its observed colour is. All the cards are black so what colour is observed is chosen by the player, representing that within the Copenhagen interpretation the card is simultaneously every colour until its colour is observed. The colour declared must still have a player token on that colour on their player board, and the number on the card being played must be free in the row of the declared colour on the research board. The colour declared by the first player in the round is called the "led colour," and players who declare colours that differ from the led colour must remove the player token from the led colour on their player board. To determine the winner of the trick, the played cards with the strongest declared colour are found (red is the strongest, then the led colour, then the other colours) and the trick winner is the player who played highest number in that set. The Trick phase repeats until only one card remains in players' hands, with the winner of the trick from the previous Trick phase being the first player in the next round. If a player is ever unable to play any card according to the guidelines, then a "paradox" occurs and the Trick phase immediately with no winner of the current trick. In the Scoring phase, players are awards points based on the number of tricks they won, the number of tokens in their longest token chain on the research board, and whether they had a correct prediction. A player who created a paradox loses points based on the number of tricks won and receives no points for a correct prediction.

The player with the most points by the end of the game is the winner.

== Reception ==
James Austin, writing for Wirecutter, listed Cat in the Box: Deluxe Edition as one of the best board games of 2025, praising the game for its balance of game mechanics and "deliciously thematic twist," and writing that it "improve[s] on the format [of trick-taking games] by giving more opportunities for players to feel clever." However, he also criticized the game's crammed token organizer and ineffective two-player experience. In an article for Paste, Keith Law similarly criticized the game's two player gameplay and "fiddly" scoring system, but also praised it for the intellectual puzzle it creates, concluding that "it’s kind of a blast to play, and the sort of game you can teach quite easily." Matt Thrower, writing for IGN, praised the game for its spin on the trick-taking genre, concluding that "head-spinning innovation of this game will take your breath away."

Cat in the Box: Deluxe Edition has been nominated for a number of board game awards, including the 2022 Casual Games American Tabletop Award, Fairplay's 2023 Á la Carte award, the 2024 Intermediate As D'Or, and the 2024 Best Advanced Game Nederlandse Spellenprijs. It won third in the Voters' Selection Japan Boardgame Prizes in 2022.
