= Werewords =

Board game

- Designers: Ted Alspach
- Illustrators: Jason Boles
- Publishers: Bézier Games (2017)
- Players: 4-10
- Setup time: 2 minutes
- Playing time: 10 minutes
- Chance: Low
- Skills: Word games, Party game

Werewords is a board game for 4 to 10 players designed by Ted Alspach and published by Bézier Games in 2017. Players guess a secret word by asking questions. There are different roles randomly assigned at the start of play. Villagers try to find out the magic word before the time is up while the werewolves are trying to mislead them.

The Deluxe edition was released via Kickstarter. The German version of the game, Werwörter was nominated for the 2019 Spiel des Jahres.

== Gameplay ==
In Werewords, players receive first their secret roles: villagers or werewolves. Then the players ask questions to the mayor in order to guess the secret word before the time is up. The werewolves try to misguide the other players in their quest for the magic word. If the villagers don't guess the word in time, they can still win by identifying the werewolf.

To help the villagers out, one player is the Seer, who knows the word but must not be too obvious when helping them figure it out; if the word is guessed, the werewolf can pull out a win by identifying the Seer.

The design and the ambiance of Werewords is taken from the original game Werewolf, edited in an upgraded version by Ted Alspach known as Ultimate Werewolf. A smartphone app is available to provide words.

== Release and reception ==
Werewords was initially released in 2017. Then a Deluxe version in 2018 was sold via Kickstarter, with about 2,400 backers contributing almost $100,000 during the campaign.

Werewords was nominee and won the 2017 Golden Geek Best Party Game Nominee.

The German version of Werewords, Werwörter was nominated for the 2019 Spiel des Jahres.
