= Acknowledgment =

Acknowledge, acknowledgment, or acknowledgement may refer to:

== Arts, entertainment and media ==
- Acknowledgment (creative arts and sciences), a statement of gratitude for assistance in producing a work
  - Acknowledgment index, a method for indexing and analyzing acknowledgments in the scientific literature
- "Acknowledgement" (song), a 1965 song from John Coltrane's album A Love Supreme

== Technology ==
- Acknowledgement (data networks), a signal used to indicate acknowledgement
  - ACK, a flag used in the Transmission Control Protocol (TCP) to acknowledge receipt of a packet

== Other uses ==
- Acknowledgment (law), a declaration of one's own act, to give it legal validity
  - Service of process, acknowledgment of service
- Acknowledgement of receipt, a postal service

== See also ==
- ACK (disambiguation)
- Credit (creative arts), acknowledgment given to someone in the creative arts
