= Gareth L. Powell =

British science fiction author (born 1970)

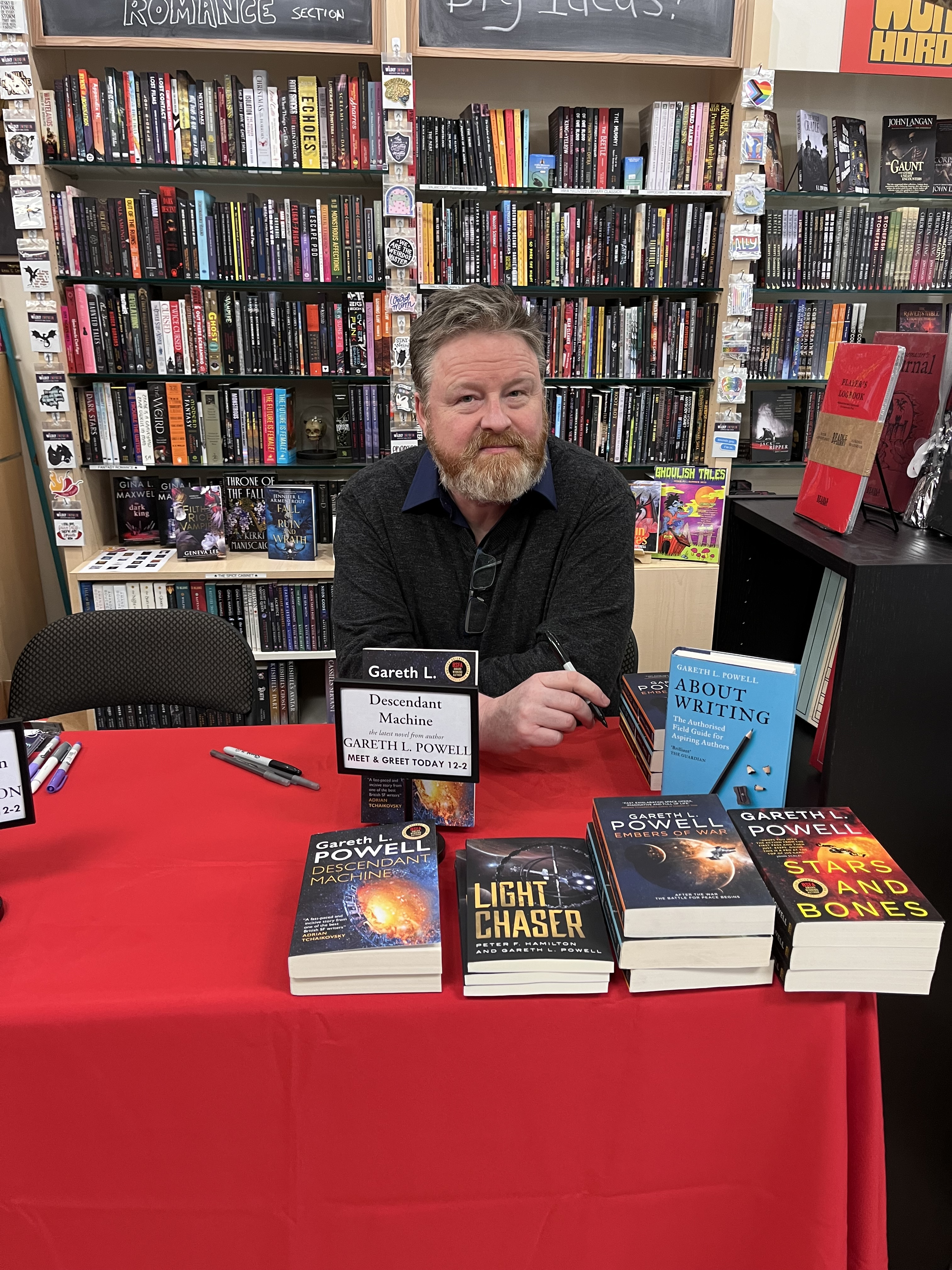
Gareth L. Powell at an author event in Petaluma, California.

Gareth Lyn Powell (born 1970) is a British author of science fiction. His works include the Embers of War trilogy, the Continuance series, the Ack-Ack Macaque trilogy, Light Chaser (co-written with Peter F. Hamilton), and About Writing, a guide for aspiring authors. He has also co-written stories with authors Peter F. Hamilton and Aliette de Bodard.

He has twice won the BSFA Award for Best Novel, for Ack-Ack Macaque in 2013 and Embers of War in 2019. Ack-Ack Macaque also became a finalist of the 2016 Seiun Award for Best Translated Long Work. He has also been shortlisted for the Locus Award, the British Fantasy Award, and the Canopus Award.

Powell's short stories have appeared in a host of magazines and anthologies, including Interzone, Solaris Rising 3, and The Year's Best Science Fiction, and his story "Ride The Blue Horse" made the shortlist for the 2015 BSFA Award. Many of his shorter works have been brought together in the collections, The Last Reef (2008) and Entropic Angel (2017). His work has been translated into French, Spanish, Italian, German, Japanese, Russian, Czech, Catalan, and Croatian.

Born and brought up in the West Country, Powell started writing sci-fi stories at an early age. He studied humanities and creative writing at the University of Glamorgan (now the University of South Wales), where he cites Diana Wynne Jones and Helen Dunmore as early mentors. He has given guest lectures on creative writing at Bath Spa University, Aberystwyth University and Buckingham New University and has written a series of non-fiction articles on science fiction for The Irish Times.

His first four novels were favourably reviewed in The Guardian by Eric Brown. In 2021 it was announced that His Embers of War series would be adapted into a television series, directed by Breck Eisner.

== Professional works ==
Powell's first book was a collection, The Last Reef and Other Stories. It compiles much of his short fiction from before 2008, including the Interzone reader's choice poll winner "Ack-Ack Macaque".

Silversands was Powell's debut novel. It was initially produced in a run of three hundred hardcover copies and an ebook edition, featuring the additional short story "Memory Dust", was made available by Anarchy Books. The reception was mostly favourable, including reviews from Interzone and Eric Brown in The Guardian. Brown regarded the novel as a "fine hi-tech romp" but was critical of what he called "a rushed and melodramatic dénouement."

The Recollection is the second novel by Powell. The novel received mostly favourable reviews, including reviews from Locus and Powell's second review from Eric Brown in his column in The Guardian. Brown said that the novel's set-pieces were "brilliantly realised" and that the book balanced its high concepts with the human story. He ended his review with "If you read only one space opera this year, it's got to be The Recollection".

In 2012, Powell released his third novel via Solaris Books, Ack-Ack Macaque, based on the short story of the same name. A sequel, Hive Monkey, followed in 2014. The third volume of the trilogy, Macaque Attack, was released in January 2015.

Titan Books published his sixth novel Embers of War in 2018. A sequel, Fleet of Knives, followed in 2019; the trilogy was concluded with Light of Impossible Stars in 2020. A news series, Also from Titan Books, began in 2022 with Stars and Bones and continued in 2023 with Descendant Machine. All five of these novels were finalists for the British Science Fiction Association Award for Best novel, and Embers of War and Fleet of Knives were both finalists for the Locus Award.

== Personal life ==
Powell lives in his native South West of the UK.

== Achievements ==
- 2023 BSFA Awards – Best Novel – Descendant Machine (finalist)
- 2023 Canopus Awards – Published Long-Form Fiction – Light Chaser (finalist)
- 2022 BSFA Awards – Best Novel – Stars and Bones (finalist)
- 2021 BSFA Awards – Best Shorter Fiction – 'Light Chaser' (finalist)
- 2021 Seiun Awards – Best Translated Novel – Embers of War (finalist)
- 2020 BSFA Awards – Best Novel – Light of Impossible Stars (finalist)
- 2020 British Fantasy Awards – Best Novella – 'Ragged Alice' (finalist)
- 2020 Locus Awards – Best SF Novel – Fleet of Knives (finalist)
- 2019 BSFA Awards – Best Novel – Fleet of Knives (finalist)
- 2019 BSFA Awards – Best Shorter Fiction – 'Ragged Alice' (finalist)
- 2019 BSFA Awards – Best Non-fiction – About Writing (finalist)
- 2019 Locus Awards – Best SF Novel – Embers of War (finalist)
- 2018 BSFA Award – Best Novel – Embers of War (winner)
- 2016 Seiun Awards – Best Translated Novel – Ack-Ack Macaque (finalist)
- 2015 BSFA Awards – Best Short Fiction – ‘Ride The Blue Horse’ (finalist)
- 2013 BSFA Award – Best Novel – Ack-Ack Macaque (winner)

== Bibliography ==
The Last Reef and Other Stories
- Author: Gareth L. Powell
- Language: English
- Genre: Science fiction
- Publisher: Elastic Press
- Publication date: August 2008
- Publication place: United Kingdom
- Media type: Print (Paperback)
- ISBN: 978-0-9553181-7-7

Silversands
- Author: Gareth L. Powell
- Language: English
- Genre: Science fiction
- Publisher: Pendragon Press
- Publication date: 10 April 2008
- Publication place: United Kingdom
- Media type: Print (Hardcover)
- Pages: 160
- ISBN: 978-1906864064

The Recollection
- Author: Gareth L. Powell
- Language: English
- Genre: Science fiction
- Publisher: Solaris Books
- Publication date: September 2011
- Publication place: United Kingdom
- Media type: Print (Paperback)
- Pages: 400
- ISBN: 978-1907519994

Ack-Ack Macaque
- Author: Gareth L. Powell
- Language: English
- Genre: Science fiction
- Publisher: Solaris Books
- Publication date: December 2012
- Publication place: United Kingdom
- Media type: Print (Paperback)
- Pages: 405
- ISBN: 978-1781080603
- Followed by: Hive Monkey

Hive Monkey
- Author: Gareth L. Powell
- Language: English
- Genre: Science fiction
- Publisher: Solaris Books
- Publication date: January 2014
- Publication place: United Kingdom
- Media type: Print (Paperback)
- Pages: 384
- ISBN: 978-1-78108-165-5
- Preceded by: Ack-Ack Macaque
- Followed by: Macaque Attack

Macaque Attack
- Author: Gareth L. Powell
- Language: English
- Genre: Science fiction
- Publisher: Solaris Books
- Publication date: January 2015
- Publication place: United Kingdom
- Media type: Print (Paperback)
- Pages: 347
- ISBN: 978-1-78108-285-0
- Preceded by: Hive Monkey

=== Novels ===
- Silversands (Pendragon Press, 2010)
- The Recollection (Solaris Books, 2011)
- Ack-Ack Macaque (Solaris Books, 2012) — Ack-Ack Macaque #1
- Hive Monkey (Solaris Books, 2014) — Ack-Ack Macaque #2
- Macaque Attack (Solaris Books, 2015) — Ack-Ack Macaque #3
- Embers of War (Titan Books, 2018) — Embers of War #1
- Fleet of Knives (Titan Books, 2019) — Embers of War #2
- Light of Impossible Stars (Titan Books, 2020) — Embers of War #3
- Stars and Bones (Titan Books, 2022) — Continuance #1
- Descendant Machine (Titan Books, 2023) — Continuance #2
- Future's Edge (Titan Books, 2025)
- Doctor Who - The Well (BBC books/Target, 2025) - Target novelisation of a TV episode by Sharma Angel-Walfall and Russell T. Davies
- Jitterbug (Titan Books, 2025)

=== Novellas ===
- Ragged Alice (Tor.com, 2019)
- Light Chaser (Tor.com, 2021), with Peter F. Hamilton

=== Short story collections ===
- The Last Reef and Other Stories (Elastic Press, 2008)
- Entropic Angel (NewCon Press, 2018)
- Who Will You Save? (Titan Books, 2025)

=== Non-fiction ===
- About Writing (Gollancz, 2022)

=== Short stories ===
- "Red Lights, And Rain" - Solaris Rising 3 (2014)
- "This is How You Die" - Interzone 251 (March 2014)
- "Ack-Ack Macaque: Indestructible" - 2000 AD (December 2012)
- "Biz Be Biz" (with Paul Graham Raven) - Colinthology (October 2012)
- "Another Apocalypse" - Solaris Rising 1.5 (August 2012)
- "Railroad Angel" - Interzone 241 (July 2012)
- "Eleven Minutes" - Interzone 231 (July 2011) (also on StarShipSofa #225)
- "The New Ships" - Further Conflicts (Newcon Press, 2011)
- "Entropic Angel" - Dark Spires (Wizard's Tower Press, 2010)
- "The Bigger The Star, The Faster It Burns" - 2020 Visions (M-Brane Press) -
- "Fallout" - Conflicts (Newcon Press, 2010)
- "The Church of Accelerated Redemption" (with Aliette de Bodard) - Shine (Solaris Books, April 2010)
- "Gonzo Laptop" - Hub Magazine (January 2010)
- "What Would Nicolas Cage Have Done?" - Future Bristol (Swimming Kangaroo Books, April 2009) (also available as an audio file on Dark Fiction Magazine)
- "Memory Dust" - Interzone (January 2009). Included in the ebook edition of Silversands.
- "Flotsam" - The Last Reef and Other Stories (Elastic Press, August 2008). Set in the same milieu as "The Last Reef" and "Hot Rain".
- "Arches" - The Last Reef and Other Stories (Elastic Press, August 2008). Elements of this story were later incorporated into The Recollection.
- "Hot Rain" - The Last Reef and Other Stories (Elastic Press, August 2008). A story expanding on an incident mentioned in "The Last Reef".
- "Falling Apart" - The Last Reef and Other Stories (Elastic Press, August 2008). A dark, entropic, near future story set in a decaying Weston-super-Mare.
- "The Long Walk Aft" - Illuminations (Odd Two Out Press, April 2008) (Also on Powell's website.) Collected in The Last Reef and Other Stories.
- "Coffee House" - Illuminations (Odd Two Out Press, April 2008)
- "Fresh Meat" - Illuminations (Odd Two Out Press, April 2008)
- "Lost Toys" - Illuminations (Odd Two Out Press, April 2008)
- "Natalie" - Illuminations (Odd Two Out Press, April 2008)
- "Snowball" - Illuminations (Odd Two Out Press, April 2008)
- "Thai Curry" - Illuminations (Odd Two Out Press, April 2008)
- "The Point Furthest From The Sun" - Illuminations (Odd Two Out Press, April 2008)
- "The Winding Curve" (with Rob Starr) - Sophistry By Degrees (Stonegarden.net, January 2008)
- "The Redoubt" - Aphelion (December 2007). A first person narrative telling of the memories of one of the last humans alive. Reprinted in The Last Reef and Other Stories.
- "Pod Dreams of Tuckertown" - Byzarium (October 2007). Collected in The Last Reef and Other Stories.
- "A Necklace of Ivy" - Fiction Online (September 2007). A rewritten version of a 1995 short story. Also in The Last Reef and Other Stories.
- "Ack-Ack Macaque" - Interzone (September 2007) (An audio version is found on Transmissions From Beyond). Winner of the 2007 Interzone reader's poll for best short story. It will be incorporated into a novel of the same name, Powell's third. Collected in The Last Reef and Other Stories.
- "The Kitten Box" - Aphelion's (November 2005). Later retitled as "Cat in a Box" in The Last Reef and Other Stories. Part of Aphelion's "Mare Inebrium" setting.
- "Dear Colleague" - Quantum Muse (April 2006)
- "The Last Reef" - Interzone (February 2006) (Reprinted on Best SF.). Powell's first Interzone sale, a story featuring the technical concept of a machine that can be used to transform its user. Reprinted in The Last Reef and Other Stories.
- "Sunsets and Hamburgers" - Byzarium (January 2006). This was an experimental story based around the concept of Transrealism. Also collected in The Last Reef and Other Stories.
- "Six Lights off Green Scar" - Aphelion (April 2005) (Archived on Infinity Plus). A story featuring starship pilots engaging in the sport of "random-jumping" via hyperdrives into unknown areas of space. Elements of this story were later incorporated into The Recollection. Also collected in The Last Reef and Other Stories.
- "Distant Galaxies Colliding" - Quantum Muse (February 2005) (Archived on Infinity Plus). Elements of this story were later incorporated into The Recollection. Also collected in The Last Reef and Other Stories.
- "Jaguars Falling From The Sky" - Quantum Muse (July 2004)
- "Catch A Burning Star" - Aphelion (April 2004). Later revised as "Morning Star" for The Last Reef and Other Stories.
- "Tranquility" - TANK Magazine (2002)
- "Providence" - TANK Magazine (2002)
