= St Andrew's Academy, Paisley =

Secondary school in Paisley, Scotland

Coordinates: 55.8307°N 4.3922°W

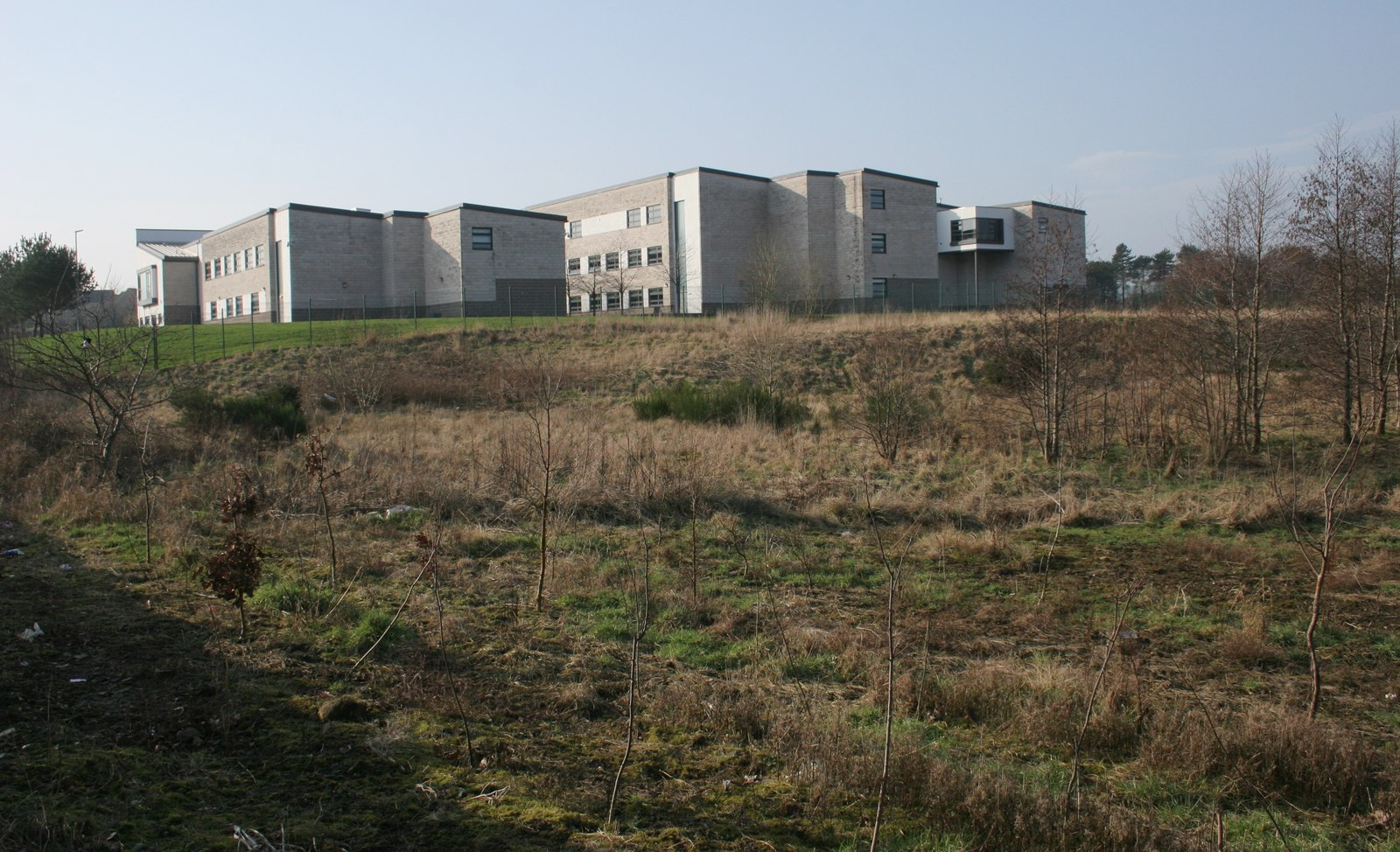
- St Andrew's Academy in 2017

Information
- Established: 1990
- Head teacher: Mr Kevin Henry

St Andrew's Academy is a Catholic secondary school in Paisley. The school was opened in 1990, with its importance growing in 2001 when St Mirin's and St Margaret's High School closed. New buildings were completed in 2006. It has eight feeder primary schools in the town. The current headteacher is Mr Kevin Henry.

In 2008, the pupil roll was 1145. By 2017, this had risen to a full capacity of 1260, causing a situation when local children who applied to attend the school but were not in the associated primaries were subject to a ballot, with some being denied a place even when their older siblings were already pupils there.

== Alumni ==
- Gillian Lindsay (b. 1973) – rower
- Paolo Nutini (b. 1987) – singer
- Angela Taylor (b. 1987) – ice hockey player
- Lucy Halliday (b. 2004) – actress

== Notable members of staff ==
- Marion Arnott, crime fiction writer (member of staff in 2001)

== Bibliography ==
- "St Andrew's Academy - Renfrewshire". Education Scotland. S
- Brady, Jon (26 March 2015). "How well is your kids' school performing? Check our table for the latest exam statistics". Daily Record.
