= Silversands =

2010 novel by Gareth L. Powell

- First edition cover
- Author: Gareth L. Powell
- Language: English
- Genre: Science fiction
- Publisher: Pendragon Press
- Publication date: 10 April 2010
- Publication place: United Kingdom
- Media type: Print (Hardcover)
- Pages: 160
- ISBN: 978-1906864064

Silversands (ISBN 1906864063, published by Pendragon Press) is a science fiction novel by British writer Gareth L. Powell. It was his debut novel.

== Plot summary ==
In an age where interstellar travel is dangerous and unpredictable, and no-one knows exactly where a trip ends up, Avril Bradley is a Communications officer on board a ship sent to re-contact as many of these lost travellers as possible. A mysterious explosion strands her in a world of political intrigue, espionage and subterfuge, where retired police officers, digital ghosts and corporate assassins who fight for possession of computer data that had lain undisturbed for almost a century.

== Ebook edition ==
As Silversands was only produced in a limited run in hardcover, online publisher Anarchy Books released a mass-market ebook edition in April 2012, including the bonus short story "Memory Dust".

== Critical reception ==
The novel received mostly favorable reviews, including reviews from Interzone and Eric Brown in The Guardian. Brown regarded the novel as a "fine hi-tech romp" but was critical of what he called "a rushed and melodramatic dénouement."
