= The Last Reef and Other Stories =

- First edition cover
- Author: Gareth L. Powell
- Language: English
- Genre: Science fiction
- Publisher: Elastic Press
- Publication date: August 2008
- Publication place: United Kingdom
- Media type: Print (paperback)
- ISBN: 978-0-9553181-7-7

The Last Reef and Other Stories (ISBN 0-9553181-7-3, published by Elastic Press) is a collection of science fiction short stories by British writer Gareth L. Powell. It compiles much of his short fiction from before 2008.

== Stories ==
- "Sunsets and Hamburgers": A 2006 short story originally in Byzarium. This was an experimental story based around the concept of Transrealism.
- "The Last Reef": A 2006 story and Powell's first Interzone sale. The story features the technical concept of a machine that can be used to transform its user. Reprinted on Best SF.
- "The Redoubt": A 2007 story, archived in Aphelion. The story is a first person narrative telling of the memories of one of the last humans alive.
- "Ack-Ack Macaque": Powell's second Interzone sale and winner of the 2007 Interzone reader's poll for best short story. It will be incorporated into a novel of the same name, Powell's third. An audio version is found on Transmissions From Beyond.
- "Pod Dreams of Tuckertown": A 2007 story, archived in Byzarium.
- "Six Lights off Green Star": A 2005 story featuring starship pilots engaging in the sport of "random-jumping" via hyperdrives into unknown areas of space. Archived on Infinity Plus. Elements of this story were later incorporated into The Recollection.
- "Distant Galaxies Colliding": a 2005 short story, originally in Quantum Muse. Also archived on Infinity Plus. Elements of this story were later incorporated into The Recollection.
- "Falling Apart": A dark, entropic, near future story from 2008 set in a decaying Weston-super-Mare.
- "Morning Star": a revised edition of the cyberpunk-inspired "Catch A Burning Star" from 2004. The original was published on Aphelion.
- "A Necklace of Ivy": A rewritten version of a 1995 short story.
- "Hot Rain": A 2008 story expanding on an incident mentioned in "The Last Reef".
- "The Long Walk Aft": Flash Fiction from 2008. Collected on Powell's website.
- "Arches": A 2008 story inspired by the London skyline. Elements of this story were later incorporated into The Recollection.
- "Flotsam": A 2008 story set in the same milieu as "The Last Reef" and "Hot Rain".
- "Cat in a Box": A retitled version of Powell's 2005 story "The Kitten Box". Part of Aphelion's "Mare Inebrium" setting.
