= ACK =

ACK, Ack or Acks may refer to:

== Computing ==
- Acknowledgement (data networks)
  - ACK (TCP), the control character used in the Transmission Control Protocol to acknowledge receipt of a packet
- Amsterdam Compiler Kit, a retargetable compiler suite and toolchain

== People ==
- Ack Kinmonth, 21st century Australian composer
- Ack van Rooyen (1930–2021), Dutch jazz trumpeter and flugelhornist
- Ron Acks (1944–2023), American National Football League player

== Transportation ==
- Nantucket Airlines or ACK Air, an American airline
- Nantucket Memorial Airport, Massachusetts, US (IATA airport code ACK)
- Acklington railway station, Acklington, Northumberland, UK (station code "ACK")

== Other uses ==
- Anglican Church of Kenya
- Amar Chitra Katha, an Indian comic book publisher
- Assumption College, Kilmore, an Australian school
- Akakhora, an extinct Great Andamanese language (ISO 639-3 code "ack")
- TNK2 or ACK or ACK1, an enzyme that in humans is encoded by the TNK2 gene

== See also ==
- Armstrong Whitworth F.K.8, an early biplane known as the "Big Ack"
- Ack Ack (disambiguation)
