= Marion Arnott =

Scottish writer (born 1952/53)

Marion Arnott (born 1952 or 1953) is a Scottish mystery, science fiction and fantasy writer. Arnott also worked as an English and history secondary school teacher at St Andrew's Academy in Paisley, Renfrewshire.

She won the Crime Writers' Association Short Story Dagger Award in 2001 with Prussian Snowdrops which focuses on a journalist who is sent to a remote part of Germany by the Nazis after making fun of the regime. She was also shortlisted for the award in 2002 for her short story "Marbles", and in 2003 for Dollface.

Her fantasy short story, "The Little Drummer Boy", was nominated for the 2007 British Fantasy Award for best short fiction. The story focuses on Francis, a boy who is routinely beaten by his father, who discovers he can leave his own body at will and enter other people's.

Her short story collection Sleepwalkers was published in 2003 by Elastic Press (ISBN 978-0954374730). Paul Kane described it as "her excellent first collection". Her "When We Were Five" was included in Elasticity: The Best of Elastic Press, an anthology published in 2017 after the closure of Elastic Press in 2009. "Another One in from the Cold" was included in The Mammoth Book of Ghost Stories Written by Women, edited by Marie O'Regan.
