= Ack Ack =

Ack Ack commonly refers to the artillery fire of anti-aircraft warfare, derived from the initials "AA".

Ack Ack or Ack-Ack may also refer to:

- Ack Ack (horse), American Hall of Fame racehorse
  - Ack Ack Handicap (Hollywood Park), a former horse race held at Hollywood Park named for the racehorse
  - Ack Ack Stakes, a horse race held at Churchill Downs named for the racehorse
- Ack-Ack Macaque, a science fiction novel by English writer Gareth L. Powell
- Andrew Haldane, nicknamed "Ack-Ack", captain in the United States Marine Corps during World War II
- Imitation of the Martian speech in the 1996 American film Mars Attacks!
