= Ted Alspach =

American game designer

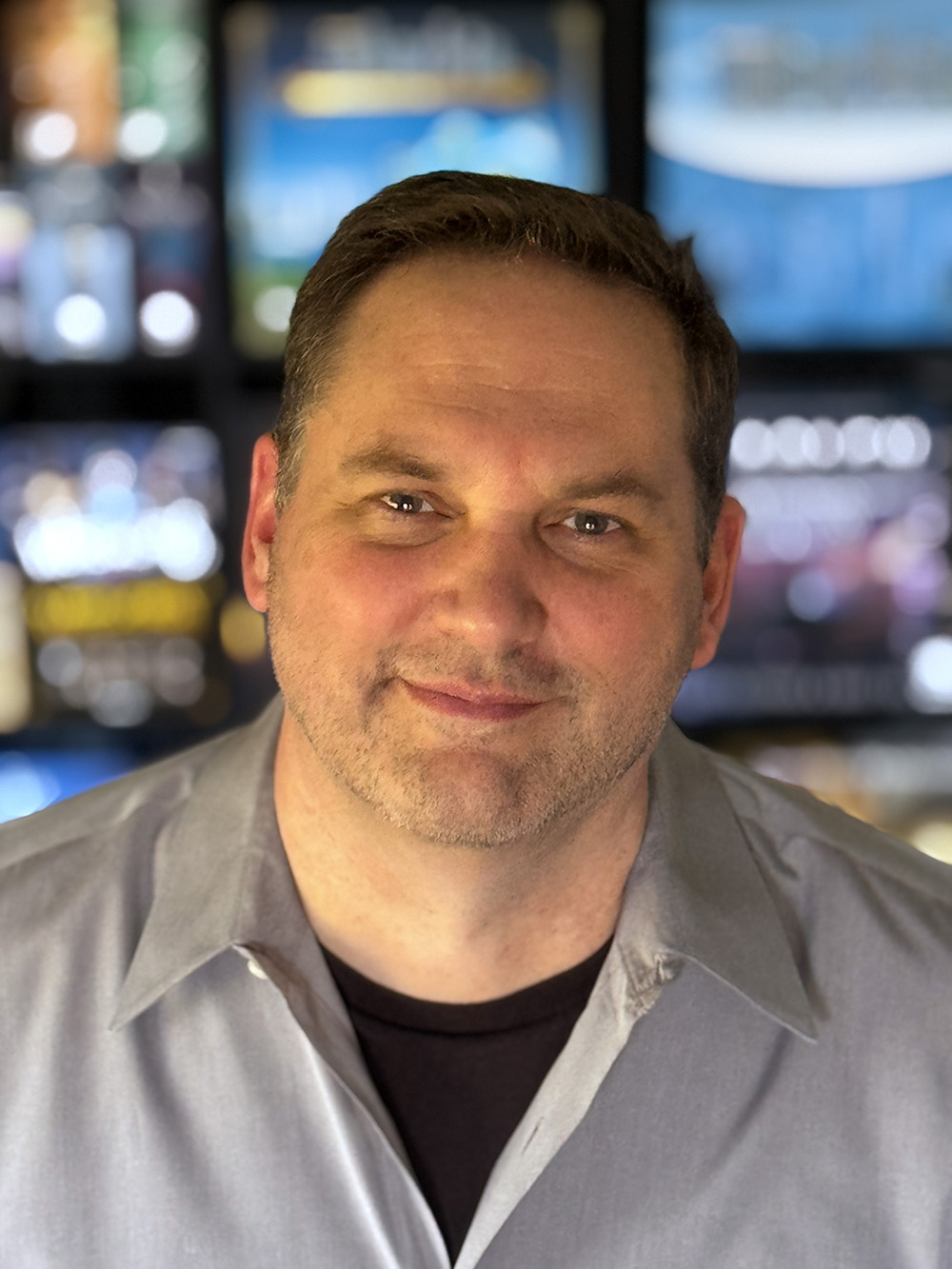
- Ted Alspach in 2024
- Born: February 1, 1968 (age 58); New York, U.S.
- Occupations: Game Designer, Founder of Bezier Games
- Known for: Werewords, Ultimate Werewolf, One Night Ultimate Werewolf Series, Suburbia, Castles of Mad King Ludwig

Ted Alspach is an American game designer and CEO of Bezier Games, Inc. He is best known as the designer of Castles of Mad King Ludwig, Suburbia, One Night Ultimate Werewolf, Ultimate Werewolf, and Werewords. Alspach is also one of the world's leading experts on Adobe Illustrator. He served as its Group Product Manager for several releases and published 18 books on it over the course of 20 years.

== Early life and education ==
Alspach was born in New York on February 1, 1968, and grew up in Southeastern Pennsylvania. He credits his father and grandfather with instilling in him a love of board games from a very early age. He received a B.S. in Marketing from Messiah College in Grantham, PA. While there, he founded and published a school magazine there, The Grand Tham, funded entirely by local business advertisements.

== Career ==
As a college senior, Alspach interned at Laser Graphics 2000, one of the country's first graphics service bureaus. This turned into an opportunity in system design and training as the small company transitioned into Teeple Graphics (which enabled printing and graphics companies to move from analog to digital tools). During this time, Alspach designed two popular typefaces: RansomNote and LeftyCasual, the latter of which has been used for branding for Comedy Central, Pixar, and Levi Strauss & Co.

=== Writing ===
As a result of developing training curriculum, Alspach began writing reviews and how-to articles for magazines such as MacAddict and Macworld. He published his first book, The Macworld Illustrator Bible, in 1995, which contained a foreword written by Pierre Bézier. Over the next several years, Alspach wrote more than 30 books on graphics and desktop publishing, including the bestselling Illustrator For Dummies series.

=== Artwork and Graphic Design ===
Alspach has also created artwork and graphic design for many projects, including most of the books and articles he's written, many of both his games and those published by Bezier Games, Inc., and was the sole creator of the Board 2 Pieces online comic, which ran twice a week from 2006 through 2012 on Boardgamenews.com and then OpinionatedGamers.com (he's the uncredited designer of that site's logo).

=== Product Management ===
Alspach worked at Adobe as Group Product Manager for Illustrator and the Creative Suite from 1999 to 2006. He oversaw the release of Illustrator 9, 10, CS, CS2, and Creative Suite CS, CS2, and was responsible for many transformative Illustrator features including Live Effects, Transparency, Envelopes, and the integration of Adobe Dimensions 3D software into Illustrator. At Adobe, he also authored a patent for vector-based flares.

Alspach also worked in product management at Intuit and Corel, as well as gamification software company Bunchball, before leaving the software industry completely in 2013.

=== Bezier Games, Inc. ===
Alspach's journey in the game industry began with publishing several expansions for Age of Steam. He founded Bezier Games in 2006 with the release of Start Player.

Alspach's games range from social deduction and party games to mid-weight strategy games. He has carved out a unique niche with werewolf themed games, from Ultimate Werewolf to Werewords to the Silver series of card games. Alspach is credited as having designed over 80 stand-alone games and expansions.

Bezier Games, Inc. now publishes many games designed by Alspach, as well as other distinguished designers such as Tom Lehmann, Freidemann Friese, Scott Caputo, and Rob Daviau. In addition to being the CEO of Bezier Games, Inc., Alspach continues to design new games and to develop titles from other designers.

== Awards ==
Suburbia and Castles of Mad King Ludwig won the Mensa Select award. His 2015 title One Night Ultimate Werewolf was on the Spiel des Jahres Recommended list due to its revolutionary app integration. In 2019, Werewords was a Spiel des Jahres finalist.

== Game Designer list ==
The following are the games and game expansions designed by Alspach, including original publication date:

- Age of Steam Expansion: Bay Area (self-published) 2005
- Seismic (Atlas Games) 2006
- Age of Steam Expansion: 1830s Pennsylvania / Northern California (self-published) 2006
- Age of Steam Expansion: Disco Inferno / Soul Train (Bezier Games) 2006
- Start Player: A Kinda Collectible Card Game (Bezier Games) 2006
- Age of Steam Expansion: Mississippi Steamboats / Golden Spike (Bezier Games) 2007
- Age of Steam Expansion: America/Europe (Bezier Games) 2007
- Age of Steam Expansion: Barbados / St. Lucia (Bezier Games) 2007
- Age of Steam Expansion: Jamaica / Puerto Rico (Bezier Games) 2007
- Ultimate Werewolf: Whitebox Edition (Bezier Games) 2007
- Rapscallion (Bezier Games) 2008
- Smarty Party - Gamers' Expansion (Bezier Games) 2008
- Age of Steam Expansion: Secret Blueprints of Steam (Bezier Games) 2008
- Ubongo Extrem Craxy Expansion (Bezier Games) 2008
- Age of Steam Expansion: Vermont, New Hampshire & Central New England (Bezier Games) 2008
- Age of Steam Expansion: Special 2008 Spiel Limited Edition: Essen Spiel & Secret Blueprints of Steam Plan #3 2008
- Ultimate Werewolf: Ultimate Edition (Bezier Games) 2008
- Start Player (Z-Man Games, daVinci Games) 2008
- FITS Expansion #1: MOTS: More of the Same (Bezier Games) 2009
- FITS Expansion #2: LOTS: Letters on the Spaces (Bezier Games) 2009
- FITS Expansion #3: BOTS: Big Obnoxious Terrible Spaces (Bezier Games) 2009
- Start Spieler (BeWitched Spiele) 2009
- Age of Steam Expansion: 1867 Georgia Reconstruction, South Carolina & Oklahoma Land Rush (Bezier Games) 2009
- Age of Steam Expansion: Alabama Railways, Antebellum Louisiana & Four Corners (Bezier Games) 2009
- Age of Steam Expansion: Beer & Pretzels (Bezier Games) 2009
- Beer & Pretzels (Bezier Games) 2009
- Beer & Pretzels: Purple Coaster Expansion (Bezier Games) 2009
- Ultimate Werewolf: Classic Movie Monsters (Bezier Games) 2010
- Ultimate Werewolf: Compact Edition (Bezier Games) 2010
- Perpetual Motion Machine (Bezier Games) 2010
- Age of Steam Expansion: California Gold Rush & Underground Railroad (Bezier Games) 2010
- Age of Steam Expansion: Amazon Rainforest & Sahara Desert (Bezier Games) 2010
- Age of Steam Expansion: Atlantis & Triland (Bezier Games) 2010
- Age of Steam Expansion: Sharing & Really Friendly Sharing (Bezier Games) 2010
- Ticked Off (R&R Games) 2011
- TieBreaker (Bezier Games) 2011
- Ultimate Werewolf: Night Terrors (Bezier Games) 2011
- Ultimate Werewolf Artifacts (Bezier Games) 2011
- Age of Steam Expansion: Australia & Tasmania (Bezier Games) 2011
- Age of Steam Expansion: African Diamond Mines & Taiwan Cube Factories (Bezier Games) 2011
- Age of Steam Expansion: Outer Space & Reversteam (Bezier Games) 2011
- Age of Steam Expansion: Orient Express & Disoriented Express (Bezier Games) 2011
- Mutant Meeples (Bezier Games, Pegasus Spiele) 2012
- Enter the Passage (Bezier Games) 2012
- Suburbia (Bezier Games, Lookout Games) 2012
- Kniffel das KartenSpiel (Schmidt Spiele) 2013
- Ultimate Werewolf: Urban Legends (Bezier Games) 2013
- You Suck (Bezier Games) 2013
- Suburbia Inc (Bezier Games) 2013
- One Night Ultimate Werewolf (with Akihisa Okui) (Bezier Games) 2014
- Ultimate Werewolf (Bezier Games) 2014
- Ultimate Werewolf: Deluxe Edition (Bezier Games) 2014
- Ultimate Werewolf: Wolfpack (Bezier Games) 2014
- Castles of Mad King Ludwig (Bezier Games) 2014
- Start Player Express (Bezier Games) 2014
- One Night Ultimate Werewolf Daybreak (with Akihisa Okui) (Bezier Games) 2015
- One Night Ultimate Werewolf Bonus Pack 1 (with Akihisa Okui) (Bezier Games) 2015
- Suburbia 5 Star (Bezier Games) 2015
- One Night Revolution (Indie Boards & Cards) 2015
- Castles of Mad King Ludwig Secrets (Bezier Games) 2015
- One Night Ultimate Vampire (Bezier Games) 2016
- One Night Ultimate Bonus Pack 2 (Bezier Games) 2016
- America (with Friedemann Friese) (Bezier Games) 2016
- Colony (with Toryo Hojo and Yoshihisa Nakatsu) (Bezier Games) 2016
- One Night Ultimate Alien (Bezier Games) 2017
- One Night Ultimate Bonus Pack 3 (Bezier Games) 2017
- Werewords (Bezier Games) 2017
- Ultimate Werewolf: Hunting Party (Bezier Games) 2017
- The Palace of Mad King Ludwig (Bezier Games) 2017
- Werewords Deluxe Edition (Bezier Games) 2018
- Ultimate Werewolf Legacy (with Rob Daviau) (Bezier Games) 2018
- One Week Ultimate Werewolf (Bezier Games) 2018
- One Night Ultimate Super Villains (Bezier Games) 2019
- Silver (Bezier Games) 2019
- Suburbia Collector's Edition (Bezier Games) 2019
- Silver Bullet (Bezier Games) 2019
- One Night Ultimate Super Heroes (Bezier Games) 2019
- One Night Ultimate Bonus Roles (Bezier Games) 2019
- Silver Coin (Bezier Games) 2020
- Silver Dagger (Bezier Games) 2020
- Maglev Metro (Bezier Games) 2021
- Suburbia 2nd Edition (Bezier Games) 2021
- Suburbia Expansions (Bezier Games) 2021
- Ultimate Werewolf Extreme (Bezier Games) 2021
- Ultimate Werewolf Bonus Roles (Bezier Games) 2021
- Ultimate Werewolf Pro (Bezier Games) 2021
- Castles of Mad King Ludwig Collector's Edition (Bezier Games) 2022
- Maglev Metro: Mechs & Monorails (Bezier Games) 2023
- Maglev Metro: Moonbases & Mars (Bezier Games) 2023
- Scram! (Bezier Games) 2023
- Castles of Mad King Ludwig: Renovations (Bezier Games) 2023
- Castles of Mad King Ludwig 2nd Edition (Bezier Games) 2023
- Castles of Mad King Ludwig: Expansions (Bezier Games) 2023
- Blueprints of Mad King Ludwig (Bezier Games) 2023
- Sandbag (Bezier Games) 2024
- The Search for UAPs (Renegade Game Studios & Bezier Games) 2024
- Silver Collector's Edition (Bezier Games) 2024
- Colossal Cat in the Box (Bezier Games) 2024
- Silver Eye (Bezier Games) 2025
- Silver Fang (Bezier Games) 2025
- Scream! (Bezier Games) 2025
- Maglev Metro: Ghost Train & Outback (Bezier Games) 2026
- Maglev Metro: Nanobots Inc. & Nanotech University (Bezier Games) 2026
- Maglev Metro: Barcelona & Chicago (Bezier Games) 2026
- Zombie Princess (Bezier Games) 2026
- Warp 99: Hyperdrive (Bezier Games) 2026

== Game Developer list ==
The following are the games and game expansions developed by Alspach, including original publication date:

- Age of Steam Expansion: Sun & London (2006)
- Ultimate Werewolf Inquisition (2013)
- Terra (English Edition) (2014)
- Favor of the Pharaoh (2015)
- Ultimate Werewolf Inquisition: Full Moon (2015)
- New York Slice (2017)
- New York Slice 2017 Specials (2017)
- Whistle Stop (2017)
- Whistle Stop PAX Promo Pack (2018)
- Werebeasts (2018)
- Werebeasts Deluxe Edition (2018)
- Whistle Stop Rocky Mountains Expansion (2018)
- CABO 2nd edition (2019)
- Whistle Mountain (2020)
- Sync or Swim (2022)
- Sync or Swim: Promo Routine Cards 2022)
- Maglev Metro: London & Paris (2023)
- Colossal Cat in the Box (2024)
- Xylotar (2024)
- Seers Catalog (2024)
- Seers Catalog: Lyin' Werewolf Promo card (2024)
- Rebel Princess 2nd Edition (2024)
- Rebel Princess Deluxe Edition (2024)
- Rebel Princess Deluxe Edition: Carmesina (2024)
- Rebel Princess: Verborgene Kräfte (2024)
- Xylotar Unhinged (2025)
- Rebel Princess: Happily Never After (2025)

== Book list ==
The following are the books written by Alspach, including original publication date (English versions only):

- Macworld Illustrator 5.0/5.5 Bible 1994
- The Complete Idiot's Guide to QuarkXPress 1994
- The Complete Idiot's Guide to Photoshop 1994
- Microsoft Bob 1995
- Internet E-Mail Quick Tour 1995
- The Mac Internet Tour Guide 1995
- Macworld Illustrator 6 Bible 1996
- Official Kai's Power Tools Studio Secrets 1996
- The Macintosh Bible, 6th Edition (with 8 co-authors) 1996
- The Complete Idiot's Guide to Word on the Macintosh 1996
- Photoshop 4 Complete 1997
- The Complete Idiot's Guide to PageMaker 1997
- Acrobat 3 Visual QuickStart Guide 1997
- Illustrator Filter Finesse 1997
- Illustrator 7 Bible 1997
- PageMaker 6.5 for Windows Visual QuickStart Guide 1997
- PageMaker 6.5 for Macintosh Visual QuickStart Guide 1997
- ImageReady Visual QuickStart Guide 1998
- Illustrator Effects Magic 1998
- PhotoDeluxe 2 Visual QuickStart Guide 1998
- Illustrator 7 Studio Secrets 1998
- Illustrator 8 Bible 1998
- PageMaker 6.5 Plus for Windows Visual QuickStart Guide 1999
- PDF with Acrobat 4 Visual QuickStart Guide 1999
- PhotoDeluxe Home Edition 4 for Windows Visual QuickStart Guide 2000
- Illustrator 9 for Dummies 2000
- Illustrator 9 Bible 2000
- PageMaker 7 for Windows and Macintosh Visual QuickStart Guide 2001
- Illustrator 10 Bible 2002
- Illustrator CS for Dummies 2003
- Illustrator CS Bible 2003
- Illustrator CS2 Bible 2005
- Illustrator CS3 Bible 2007
- Illustrator CS4 for Dummies 2008
- Illustrator CS4 Bible 2008
- Illustrator CS5 Bible 2010
- Board 2 Pieces: Of Dice and Meeples 2011
- Board 2 Pieces: Something Smells Gamey 2011
- One Night Ultimate Compendium 2017
