= Suburbia (board game) =

City-building tile-laying board game

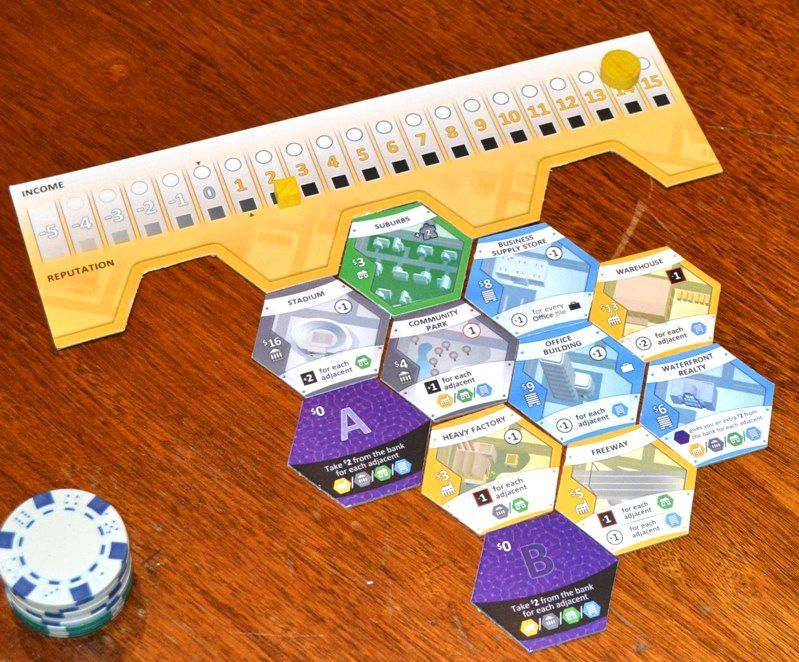
- Designers: Ted Alspach
- Publishers: Bézier Games
- Publication: 2012; 14 years ago
- Genres: City-building
- Players: 1–4
- Playing time: 60–90 minutes
- Age range: 8+

Suburbia is a city-building tile-laying board game designed by Ted Alspach and published in 2012 by Bézier Games.

The company released an app in 2013, and a game called Subdivision in 2014, as part of the Suburbia family of games. In 2015, it released the expansion set Suburbia 5 Star. In 2019, a Kickstarter campaign established to develop Suburbia Collector's Edition raised $1.8 million. An expansion called Nightlife was released for the collector's edition of the game and the app, but is incompatible with the base version.

== Gameplay ==
All players start with a Borough Board, adjacent to which are arranged three hex tiles (one Suburbs, one Community Park, and one Heavy Factory), $15 in coins, and three investment markers. Each player adds a population marker to the population board.

Once the game setup is complete, each player chooses a personal objective from two random draws. All players must also achieve a set of public objectives, the number of which is based on the number of players. Upon achieving a personal or public goal, the player receives a population bonus.

On their turn, players execute four actions: obtain one tile or investment marker and place it in their borough, collect income, recalculate their borough's population, and add a new tile to the real estate market. A tile is obtained from one of the seven tiles in the real estate market by paying its face value cost (if it is one of the two rightmost tiles), or its face value cost and an additional positional cost (for the remaining five tiles). An investment marker is used to double all values printed on a tile already placed in the player's borough. The income a player collects is based on their position on the income track, and the population adjustment is based on their position on the reputation track. The turn is completed by sliding all tiles in the real estate market to the right and adding a new tile at the leftmost position.

The population board has a number of red markers at various points. Upon reaching each marker, the player loses a point of income, to reflect the greater costs of municipal services, and one point of reputation, to reflect an increase in crime and pollution accompanying greater density.

When the "1 More Round" tile is drawn, each player takes a final turn, then the game ends. Players determine if any objectives have been achieved and adjust their borough's population per the objective's criteria. The winner is the player with the greatest population, which is the game's victory points measure.

== Reception ==
In a review for Board Game Quest, Tony Mastrangeli states that the art and design are "really well done" and the artwork to be "colorful and thematic". He also states that the game involves a "decent amount of player interaction" and has substantial replay value.

Andrew Holmes, in a review for Meeple Mountain, states that the game is "balanced and it's brilliant". Quintin Smith said it is a "masterfully designed game" in his review for The Guardian and that he would "happily recommend ... to everyone". Jon Seagull, in a review for Boing Boing, stated that there is little luck involved in the gameplay, but that "keeping track of the interdependent effects" of various tiles could be tedious. Aaron Zimmerman stated in Ars Technica that the app eliminates some of the "tedious bookkeeping" of the physical game.

The expansion set Suburbia 5 Star was poorly received.

== Awards ==
Suburbia was one of five recipients of the 2013 Mensa Select award.
