= Chris Ferrie =

Canadian physicist and children's book author (born 1982)

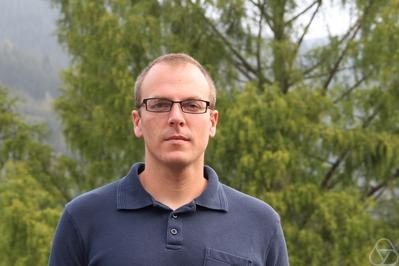
- Ferrie at Oberwolfach in 2014
- Born: Christopher Ferrie; 1982 (age 43–44); Canada
- Education: University of Waterloo, University of New Mexico and University of Technology Sydney
- Occupations: mathematician, researcher, lecturer, and children's book author

Chris Ferrie (born 1982) is a Canadian physicist and children's book author.

Ferrie studied at the University of Waterloo in Waterloo, Ontario Canada, where he earned a BSc in mathematical physics, a masters in applied mathematics, and a PhD in applied mathematics on Theory and Applications of Probability in Quantum Mechanics from the Institute for Quantum Computing and University of Waterloo.

From 2013 to 2014 he worked as a postdoctoral fellow at the Center for Quantum Information and Control of the University of New Mexico.

From 2015 to 2017 he was a postdoctoral research associate and since 2017 he has been working as a senior lecturer at the Centre for Engineer Quantum Systems of the University of Technology Sydney.

Ferrie is the creator and author of the children's book brand Baby University, a series of board books and picture books that introduce complex subjects to children. His popular Quantum Physics for Babies book, a part of this series, has seven scholarly citations on Google Scholar.

In 2017, Ferrie joined the production of a 52-episode online video course titled "Physics For Babies". In the video series, Dr. Chris and Mengmeng, an animated koala, together introduce some basic concepts of physics such as quantum physics, optics and electromagnetism to school age kids through stories, classes and interactive games. The series was produced by Mecoo Media in Australia and was broadcast from May 2017 to May 2018 on China’s online platforms. This is also the first marketing of Dr. Chris’ image in the Chinese market.

From February 2018 to November 2019, Ferrie worked with CCPPG (China Children's Press & Publication Group) and Mecoo Media and published a 50 book series "Red Kangaroo Thousands Physics Whys". The series explains various science phenomenons around kids’ everyday life in simple terms through lively conversation between Dr. Chris and a very cute Red Kangaroo. The series cover 5 themes including everyday physics, quantum physics, newtonian physics, optical physics and aerodynamics. This set of books has become a must read book for children in many kindergartens in China. Sourcebooks has preempted world English rights to the Red Kangaroo series in 2018.

On 30 April 2020 Ferrie announced that he was joining an Australian science podcast called Sci-gasm.

Ferrie is married and father of four children.

== Books ==
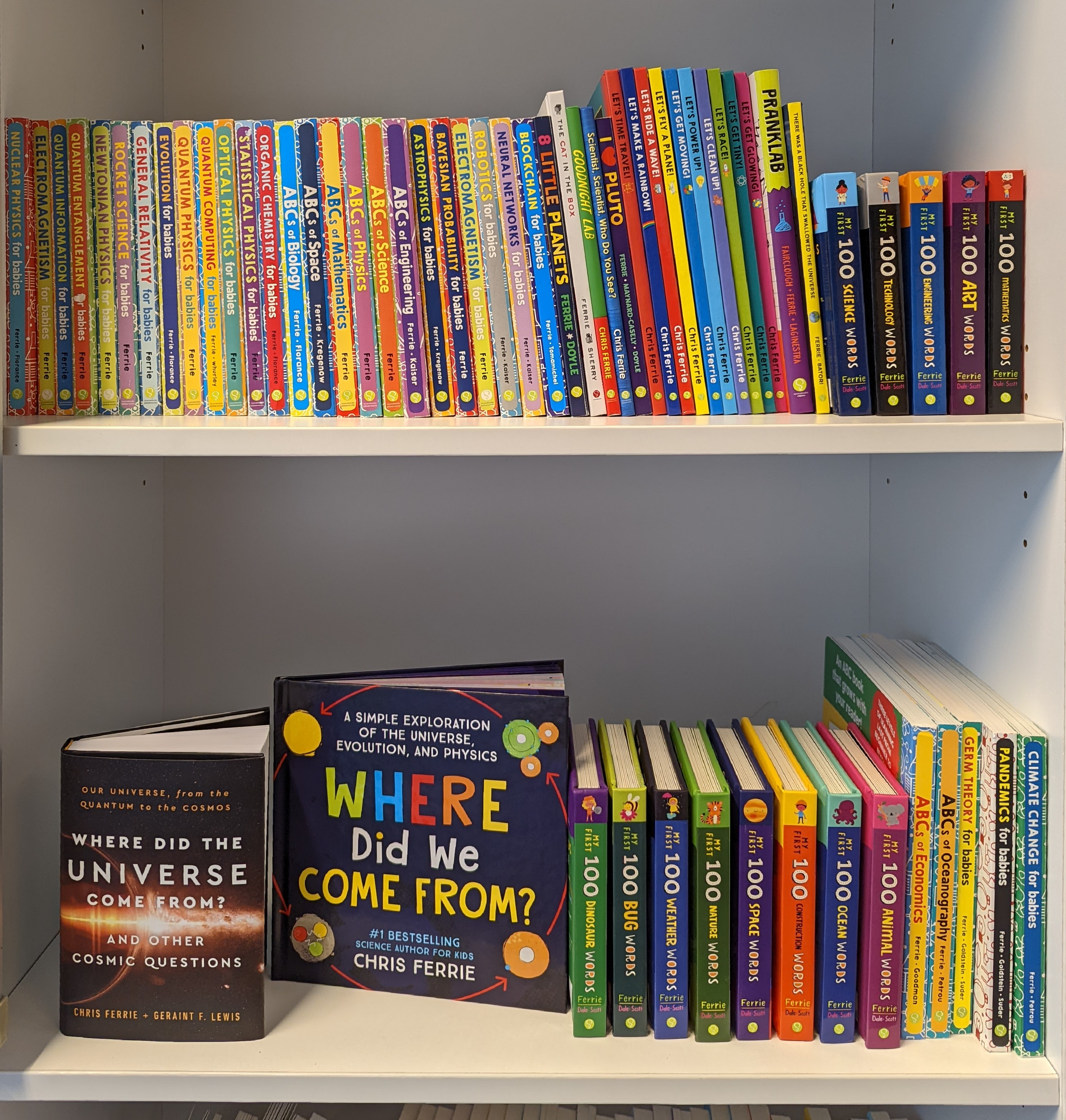
A bookshelf full of Chris Ferrie's books

| Series | Title | Publisher | Place | ISBN13 | First publication | Format | Dimensions |
|---|---|---|---|---|---|---|---|
| Baby University | 8 Little Planets | Sourcebooks Inc. | Naperville, US | ISBN 9781492671244 | 2018-10-02 | Board book / 18 p. | 203 x 203 x 25mm ~ 295g |
| Baby University | I (Heart) Pluto | Sourcebooks Inc. | Naperville, US | ISBN 9781728205243 | 2020-04-07 | Board book / 18 p. | 203 x 203 x 25mm ~ 329g |
| Baby University | There Was a Black Hole that Swallowed the Universe | Sourcebooks Inc. | Naperville, US | ISBN 9781492680772 | 2019-09-03 | Hardback / 40 p. | 210 x 260 x 38mm ~ 385g |
| Baby University | The Cat in the Box | Sourcebooks Inc. | Naperville, US | ISBN 9781492671237 | 2019-07-04 | Hardback / 48 p. | 144 x 220 x 38mm ~ 225g |
| Baby University | Pranklab (announced) | Sourcebooks Inc. | Naperville, US | ISBN 9781728223742 | 2021-04-01 | Paperback / 224 p. | 146 x 203 x 38.1mm |
| Baby University. | Z Is for Zoom: A Scientific Alphabet of How Things Go, from Alternator to Zerk Fitting | Sourcebooks Inc. | Naperville, US | ISBN 9781728205786 | 2020-04-21 | Board book / 26 p. | 203 x 203 x 25mm ~ 329g |
| Baby University. Let's | Let's Fly a Plane! : Launching into the Science of Flight with Aerospace Engineering | Sourcebooks Inc. | Naperville, US | ISBN 9781492680574 | 2020-06-02 | Hardback / 40 p. | 235 x 235 x 38mm ~ 365g |
| Baby University. Let's | Let's Ride a Wave! : Diving into the Science of Light and Sound Waves with Physics | Sourcebooks Inc. | Naperville, US | ISBN 9781492680581 | 2020-06-02 | Hardback / 40 p. | 235 x 235 x 38mm ~ 365g |
| Baby University. Let's | Let's Get Moving! : Speeding into the Science of Motion with Newtonian Physics | Sourcebooks Inc. | Naperville, US | ISBN 9781492680598 | 2020-06-02 | Hardback / 40 p. | 235 x 235 x 38mm ~ 385g |
| Baby University. Let's | Let's Make a Rainbow! : Seeing the Science of Light with Optical Physics | Sourcebooks Inc. | Naperville, US | ISBN 9781492680604 | 2020-06-02 | Hardback / 40 p. | 235 x 235 x 38mm ~ 365g |
| Baby University. Let's | Let's Race! : Sprinting into the Science of Light Speed with Special Relativity | Sourcebooks Inc. | Naperville, US | ISBN 9781492680611 | 2020-08-04 | Hardback / 40 p. | 235 x 235 x 38mm ~ 365g |
| Baby University. Let's | Let's Clean Up! : Unpacking the Science of Messy Rooms with Statistical Physics | Sourcebooks Inc. | Naperville, US | ISBN 9781492680628 | 2020-08-04 | Hardback / 40 p. | 235 x 235 x 38mm ~ 365g |
| Baby University. Let's | Let's Time Travel! : Zooming into the Science of Space-Time with General Relativity | Sourcebooks Inc. | Naperville, US | ISBN 9781492680635 | 2020-10-06 | Hardback / 40 p. | 235 x 235 x 38mm ~ 365g |
| Baby University. Let's | Let's Power Up! : Charging into the Science of Electric Currents with Electrical Engineering | Sourcebooks Inc. | Naperville, US | ISBN 9781492680642 | 2020-10-06 | Hardback / 40 p. | 235 x 235 x 38mm ~ 365g |
| Baby University. Let's | Let's Get Tiny! : Jumping into the Science of the Smallest Part of Matter with Quantum Physics | Sourcebooks Inc. | Naperville, US | ISBN 9781492680659 | 2020-12-01 | Hardback / 40 p. | 235 x 235 x 38mm ~ 385g |
| Baby University. Let's | Let's Get Glowing! : Revealing the Science of Radioactivity with Nuclear Physics | Sourcebooks Inc. | Naperville, US | ISBN 9781492680666 | 2020-12-01 | Hardback / 40 p. | 235 x 235 x 38mm ~ 329g |
| Baby University. A Scientific Parody | Goodnight Lab | Sourcebooks Inc. | Naperville, US | ISBN 9781728213323 | 2019-10-01 | Board book / 26 p. | 203 x 203 x 25mm ~ 480g |
| Baby University. A Scientific Parody | Scientist, Scientist, Who Do You See? | Sourcebooks Inc. | Naperville, US | ISBN 9781728213330 | 2020-01-07 | Board book / 26 p. | 203 x 203 x 25mm ~ 380g |
| Baby University. A Scientific Parody | Goodnight Lab | Sourcebooks Inc. | Naperville, US | ISBN 9781492656173 | 2017-11-27 | Hardback / 32 p. | 210 x 260 x 38mm ~ 375g |
| Baby University. A Scientific Parody | Scientist, Scientist, Who Do You See? | Sourcebooks Inc. | Naperville, US | ISBN 9781492656180 | 2018-04-03 | Hardback / 32 p. | 210 x 260 x 38mm ~ 385g |
| Baby University. ABCs of | ABC's of Physics | Sourcebooks Inc. | Naperville, US | ISBN 9781492656241 | 2018-02-26 | Board book / 26 p. | 203 x 203 x 25mm ~ 410g |
| Baby University. ABCs of | ABC's of Mathematics | Sourcebooks Inc. | Naperville, US | ISBN 9781492656289 | 2018-02-26 | Board book / 26 p. | 203 x 203 x 25mm ~ 375g |
| Baby University. ABCs of | ABC's of Space | Sourcebooks Inc. | Naperville, US | ISBN 9781492671121 | 2018-05-01 | Board book / 26 p. | 203 x 203 x 25mm ~ 365g |
| Baby University. ABCs of | ABC's of Biology | Sourcebooks Inc. | Naperville, US | ISBN 9781492671145 | 2018-06-05 | Board book / 26 p. | 203 x 203 x 25mm ~ 329g |
| Baby University. ABCs of | ABC's of Science | Sourcebooks Inc. | Naperville, US | ISBN 9781492656319 | 2018-09-04 | Board book / 26 p. | 203 x 203 x 25mm ~ 385g |
| Baby University. ABCs of | ABC's of Engineering | Sourcebooks Inc. | Naperville, US | ISBN 9781492671213 | 2019-01-01 | Board book / 26 p. | 203 x 203 x 25mm ~ 365g |
| Baby University. ABCs of | ABC's of Oceanography | Sourcebooks Inc. | Naperville, US | ISBN 9781492680819 | 2020-08-18 | Board book / 26 p. | 203 x 203 x 25mm ~ 329g |
| Baby University. ABCs of | ABC's of Economics | Sourcebooks Inc. | Naperville, US | ISBN 9781728220406 | 2020-08-18 | Board book / 26 p. | 203 x 203 x 25mm ~ 365g |
| Baby University. ABCs of | ABC's of Geography (announced) | Sourcebooks Inc. | Naperville, US | ISBN 9781728232584 | 2022-02-06 | Board book / 26 p. | 203 x 203 x 25mm ~ |
| Baby University. for Babies | Newtonian Physics for babies | Sourcebooks Inc. | Naperville, US | ISBN 9781492656203 | 2017-09-26 | Board book / 24 p. | 203 x 203 x 25mm ~ 375g |
| Baby University. for Babies | Optical Physics for babies | Sourcebooks Inc. | Naperville, US | ISBN 9781492656210 | 2017-10-02 | Board book / 24 p. | 203 x 203 x 25mm ~ 295g |
| Baby University. for Babies | Quantum Entanglement for babies | Sourcebooks Inc. | Naperville, US | ISBN 9781492656234 | 2017-10-02 | Board book / 24 p. | 203 x 203 x 25mm ~ 375g |
| Baby University. for Babies | Quantum Physics for babies | Sourcebooks Inc. | Naperville, US | ISBN 9781492656227 | 2017-10-09 | Board book / 24 p. | 203 x 203 x 25mm ~ 375g |
| Baby University. for Babies | Rocket Science for babies | Sourcebooks Inc. | Naperville, US | ISBN 9781492656258 | 2017-10-09 | Board book / 24 p. | 203 x 203 x 25mm ~ 375g |
| Baby University. for Babies | General Relativity for babies | Sourcebooks Inc. | Naperville, US | ISBN 9781492656265 | 2017-12-18 | Board book / 24 p. | 203 x 203 x 25mm ~ 300g |
| Baby University. for Babies | Statistical Physics for babies | Sourcebooks Inc. | Naperville, US | ISBN 9781492656272 | 2018-01-02 | Board book / 24 p. | 203 x 203 x 25mm ~ 365g |
| Baby University. for Babies | Electromagnetism for babies | Sourcebooks Inc. | Naperville, US | ISBN 9781492656296 | 2018-01-02 | Board book / 24 p. | 203 x 203 x 25mm ~ 365g |
| Baby University. for Babies | Quantum Information for babies | Sourcebooks Inc. | Naperville, US | ISBN 9781492656302 | 2018-01-02 | Board book / 24 p. | 203 x 203 x 25mm ~ 410g |
| Baby University. for Babies | Quantum Computing for babies | Sourcebooks Inc. | Naperville, US | ISBN 9781492671183 | 2018-04-03 | Board book / 24 p. | 203 x 203 x 25mm ~ 329g |
| Baby University. for Babies | Organic Chemistry for babies | Sourcebooks Inc. | Naperville, US | ISBN 9781492671169 | 2018-05-01 | Board book / 24 p. | 203 x 203 x 25mm ~ 410g |
| Baby University. for Babies | Nuclear Physics for babies | Sourcebooks Inc. | Naperville, US | ISBN 9781492671176 | 2018-05-01 | Board book / 24 p. | 203 x 203 x 25mm ~ 410g |
| Baby University. for Babies | Evolution for babies | Sourcebooks Inc. | Naperville, US | ISBN 9781492671152 | 2018-06-05 | Board book / 24 p. | 203 x 203 x 25mm ~ 365g |
| Baby University. for Babies | Astrophysics for babies | Sourcebooks Inc. | Naperville, US | ISBN 9781492671138 | 2018-07-03 | Board book / 24 p. | 203 x 203 x 25mm ~ 295g |
| Baby University. for Babies | Blockchain for babies | Sourcebooks Inc. | Naperville, US | ISBN 9781492680789 | 2019-01-01 | Board book / 24 p. | 203 x 203 x 25mm ~ 295g |
| Baby University. for Babies | Robotics for babies | Sourcebooks Inc. | Naperville, US | ISBN 9781492671190 | 2019-03-01 | Board book / 24 p. | 203 x 203 x 25mm ~ 329g |
| Baby University. for Babies | Neural Networks for babies | Sourcebooks Inc. | Naperville, US | ISBN 9781492671206 | 2019-03-01 | Board book / 24 p. | 203 x 203 x 25mm ~ 365g |
| Baby University. for Babies | Bayesian probability for babies | Sourcebooks Inc. | Naperville, US | ISBN 9781492680796 | 2019-07-02 | Board book / 24 p. | 203 x 203 x 25mm ~ 329g |
| Baby University. for Babies | Climate change for babies | Sourcebooks Inc. | Naperville, US | ISBN 9781492680826 | 2020-08-18 | Board book / 24 p. | 203 x 203 x 25mm ~ 295g |
| Baby University. for Babies | Pandemics for babies | Sourcebooks Inc. | Naperville, US | ISBN 9781728234168 | 2020-10-27 | Board book / 24 p. | 203 x 203 x 25mm ~ 365g |
| Baby University. for Babies | Germ Theory for babies | Sourcebooks Inc. | Naperville, US | ISBN 9781728234076 | 2021-02-02 | Board book / 24 p. | 203 x 203 x 25mm ~ 300g |
| Baby University. for Babies | Archaeology for babies (announced) | Sourcebooks Inc. | Naperville, US | ISBN 9781728232553 | 2022-03-01 | Board book / 24 p. | 203 x 203 x 25mm ~ |
| My first STEAM words | My First 100 Engineering Words | Sourcebooks Inc. | Naperville, US | ISBN 9781728214375 | 2020-04-01 | Board book / 24 p. | 254 x 254mm |
| My first STEAM words | My First 100 Bug Words (announced) | Sourcebooks Inc. | Naperville, US | ISBN 9781728232614 | 2020-04-01 | Board book / 24 p. | 133 x 159 x 32mm ~ |
| My first STEAM words | My First 100 Science words | Sourcebooks Inc. | Naperville, US | ISBN 9781728211244 | 2020-04-07 | Board book / 24 p. | 133 x 159 x 32mm ~ 275g |
| My first STEAM words | My First 100 Engineering Words | Sourcebooks Inc. | Naperville, US | ISBN 9781728211251 | 2020-04-07 | Board book / 24 p. | 133 x 159 x 32mm ~ 275g |
| My first STEAM words | My First 100 Art Words | Sourcebooks Inc. | Naperville, US | ISBN 9781728211268 | 2020-04-07 | Board book / 24 p. | 133 x 159 x 32mm ~ 275g |
| My first STEAM words | My First 100 Mathematics Words | Sourcebooks Inc. | Naperville, US | ISBN 9781728211275 | 2020-04-07 | Board book / 24 p. | 133 x 159 x 32mm ~ 275g |
| My first STEAM words | My First 100 Science words | Sourcebooks Inc. | Naperville, US | ISBN 9781728211282 | 2020-04-07 | Board book / 24 p. | 133 x 159 x 32mm ~ 275g |
| My first STEAM words | My First 100 Technology Words | Sourcebooks Inc. | Naperville, US | ISBN 9781728220345 | 2020-11-03 | Board book / 24 p. | 133 x 159 x 32mm ~ 275g |
| My first STEAM words | My First 100 Ocean Words | Sourcebooks Inc. | Naperville, US | ISBN 9781728220376 | 2020-12-01 | Board book / 24 p. | 133 x 159 x 32mm ~ 275g |
| My first STEAM words | My First 100 Nature Words | Sourcebooks Inc. | Naperville, US | ISBN 9781728228600 | 2020-12-01 | Board book / 24 p. | 133 x 159 x 32mm ~ 275g |
| My first STEAM words | My First 100 Weather Words (announced) | Sourcebooks Inc. | Naperville, US | ISBN 9781728228624 | 2021-01-05 | Board book / 24 p. | 133 x 159 x 32mm ~ 275g |
| My first STEAM words | My First 100 Space Words | Sourcebooks Inc. | Naperville, US | ISBN 9781728228617 | 2021-02-01 | Board book / 24 p. | 133 x 159 x 32mm ~ 275g |
| My first STEAM words | My First 100 Construction Words | Sourcebooks Inc. | Naperville, US | ISBN 9781728232614 | 2021-08-03 | Board book / 24 p. | 133 x 159 x 32mm ~ |
| My first STEAM words | My First 100 Animal Words | Sourcebooks Inc. | Naperville, US | ISBN 9781728232676 | 2021-08-03 | Board book / 24 p. | 133 x 159 x 32mm ~ |

== Awards ==
- Australian Research Council Discovery Early Career Researcher Award (2017)
