= Blue Defense =

Blue Defense!
- Developer: Cat in a Box Games
- Publisher: Cat in a Box Games
- Platform: iOS
- Release: Jan 31, 2009

Blue Defense! (formerly Defend!) is an iOS game by Canadian developer John Kooistra and released on Jan 31, 2009. A sequel entitled Blue Defense: Second Wave! was developed by Cat in a Box Games and released on September 30, 2010. Blue Attack! is a spin-off.

== Critical reception ==
=== Blue Defense! ===
TouchArcade said "Progressive levels are increasingly challenging and provides a good amount of gameplay. Normally, we frown upon games without sound, but for $0.99 and an otherwise fun game, we can overlook it". Appadvice wrote "Blue Defense! is a fun little game that doesn't clutter up the experience with anything. Those looking for something reminiscent of arcade classics like Space Invaders, Galaga, or other vertical shooters will be pleased. If you don't like primary colors, silence, or are afraid of your iPhone getting motion sickness, this game is not for you. Personally, I enjoyed it for a day and didn't open it up again until this review". TouchMyApps said "Blue Defense! is tastefully designed and brimming with twists, turns and tongue biting. Its polished graphics, smooth animation and habit-forming gameplay are praiseworthy, but without sound and a global scoring system it feels somewhat unfinished. So, is it worth the 99 cents? Absolutely". 148Apps wrote "Fantastic, simple, fun, wonderful game. Very unexpected but very much appreciated. Easily one of my favorite games thus far for the iPhone.

=== Blue Defense: Second Wave! ===
Blue Defense: Second Wave! has a Metacritic score of 85% based on 7 critic reviews.

AppSmile said "Following in the style of the original Blue Defense, Second Wave offers some additional control methods and a bunch of game modes to keep you busy as you blast invading forces and climb the leaderboards. " NoDPad wrote "As a sequel, Blue Defense: Second Wave captures everything that was great about the first game, refines it, builds upon it, ups the ante manifold. " 148Apps said "It's just hard to come up with a list of complaints about this game, because of how well made it is. Blue Defense: Second Wave is original, intense, addictive, and most of all, fun. Fan of action games on iOS deserve to give this game a shot. " AppSpy said "Blue Defense: Second Wave! is a great sequel to what was already a great title and while the tilt controls may be a bit gimmicky, the gameplay is almost second to none. " Touchgen said "A brilliant game to play for that ten minute break, or on the bus. It lacks long term appeal due to both being so intense, and because there are too many modes and choices to make. " Multiplayer.it wrote "Although way better than the previous chapter, Blue Defense: Second Wave! is certainly less ambitious than Red Conquest. It must be said though that even if the game lacks any real additional mode, plot or multiplayer experience, the new units and the deeper control system will satisfy any hardcore gamer that thought the first Blue Defense was too easy. " Pocket Gamer UK said "Blue Defense: Second Wave! is amusing when played to fill a free minute or two, but it lacks the depth needed to encourage extended play. "

=== Blue Attack! ===
IGN said "This is a great little space shooter for $2. I like the weapon upgrades and different formations. The game is a challenge when it comes to beating the clock, perhaps too much of a challenge that it closes off parts of the game. Still, it's a worthy addition to your shooter library."
