= Ack-Ack Macaque =

2012 novel by Gareth L. Powell

- First edition
- Author: Gareth L. Powell
- Language: English
- Genre: Science fiction
- Publisher: Solaris Books
- Publication date: 26 December 2012
- Publication place: United Kingdom
- Media type: Print (Paperback)
- Pages: 416
- ISBN: 978-1-78108-060-3

Ack-Ack Macaque is a 2012 science fiction novel by English writer Gareth L. Powell.

== Plot summary ==
Ack-Ack Macaque is based on Powell's earlier short story of the same name, which won the Interzone reader's poll in 2007. The original short story is included as an appendix to the novel. The novel has aspects of alternative history as in this version of reality the United Kingdom and France merged in the 1950s to form the nation of Brittany. The macaque of the title is the star of a highly regarded, exclusive massively multiplayer online role-playing game (with the roguelike feature of character death being final) which is itself set in an alternate reality World War II. The main character in the novel is former journalist Victoria Valois, who attempts to track down the man who murdered her husband and stole her neural implant while the heir to the throne of Brittany becomes a fugitive after breaking into a Parisian research laboratory. As the novel progresses, these strands are drawn together and the true purpose of the macaque is revealed.

A sequel, Hive Monkey, was released in 2014.

== Critical reception ==
The novel gained Powell a third review from Eric Brown in The Guardian. Brown described the novel as "inventive" with "brilliant cliffhangers" and a "satisfying conclusion".

Philip Reeve said that the novel "could all be quite exhausting, but it's done with such obvious enthusiasm that it's impossible not to be carried along by it."

The novel was a joint winner of the 2013 BSFA Award for Best Novel with Ann Leckie's Ancillary Justice.
