= Stars and Bones =

2022 science fiction novel by Gareth L. Powell

- First edition cover
- Author: Gareth L. Powell
- Language: English
- Genres: Science fiction, space opera, cosmic horror
- Publisher: Titan Books
- Publication date: March 2022
- Publication place: United Kingdom
- Media type: Trade paperback
- Pages: 352
- ISBN: 978-1-78909-428-2

Stars and Bones is a science fiction novel by British writer Gareth L. Powell. It was first published in the United Kingdom in March 2022 by Titan Books, and is the first book of Powell's Continuance series. Stars and Bones is about the Thousand Arks of the Continuance, a fleet of sentient starships that are home to the entire human population who had been evicted from Earth by an alien intelligence known as the Benevolence, for slowly destroying their planet.

Stars and Bones was nominated for the 2023 British Science Fiction Association Award for Best Novel.

== Plot summary ==
The Benevolence, an alien intelligence that observes and catalogues life in the galaxy, noted with disapproval the way humans on Earth were slowly destroying their world. To save the planet, the Benevolence constructed a thousand sentient spaceships or arks, and filled them with the entire human population. Each ark is an artificial world with Earth-like environments, and their inhabitants are provided with all they need in terms of provisions, equipment and resources.

Seventy-five years later, the arks are adrift amongst the stars. Scout ships fan out ahead of the fleet to check for any threats or opportunities. The scouts also investigate planetary systems they pass for any signs of life and potential colonisation. But a visit to a planet called Candidate-623 stirs an unseen alien force which destroys the scout ship and dismembers its crew. After locating the scout ship's home base, the force begins to infiltrate and infect the arks, one by one.

== Background ==
Powell said in an interview that the idea behind Stars and Bones came from a comment he made to someone on climate change about "how good it would be if aliens came and sorted it all out for us." This led him to consider what could happen if something like that really did happen. Powell cited Iain Banks, Samuel R. Delany, Ann Leckie and Peter F. Hamilton as influences for the book's technology, and Michael Moorcock, Becky Chambers, Ursula K. Le Guin and Octavia E. Butler for the characters.

Powell explained that he chose to set the story 75 years in the future "because I felt that was the farthest I could push it before the effects of climate change altered society beyond all recognition. And also because I wanted to make sure it was far enough from today that I'd be safely dead and gone before my predictions were proved false."

== Critical reception ==
In a review of Stars and Bones in Booklist, David Pitt wrote "[w]ith a strong heroine, some really imaginative supporting characters ... and a story that packs a serious emotional wallop, the novel spotlights Powell's gifts for character-building and plotting." Pitt added that with Powell having won several best-novel awards for some of his previous works, "it wouldn't be surprising to see this one getting a nomination, too." In a starred review, Publishers Weekly stated: "Powell balances plot, action, and character development perfectly. This promising start will especially appeal to James S. A. Corey fans."

Writing in GeekDad, Robin Brooks described Stars and Bones as "a hi-concept monster thriller" with an unexpected "human core". He said the book's characters, including the ships' AIs, "are well-realized and interesting people". He called Eryn "a great narrator", and added that she is "a trademark Powell character", namely "[s]trong, independent, and sarcastic". Brooks concluded that "Powell shows himself to be the master of pace and setting, with great sci-fi concepts and impeccable dialogue."
