= Ultimate Werewolf =

Board game adaptation of the social deduction game Warewolf

- Cover art for the deluxe edition released in 2014
- Designers: Ted Alspach
- Publishers: Bézier Games, Inc.
- Players: 5 to 75
- Setup time: 5 minutes
- Playing time: 15-45 minutes (depending on number of players)
- Age range: 9 & up
- Skills: Bluffing, Partnership, Social skills, Roleplay, Negotiation, Deduction

Ultimate Werewolf is a card game designed by Ted Alspach and published by Bézier Games. It is based on the social deduction game, Werewolf, which is Andrew Plotkin's reinvention of Dimitry Davidoff's 1987 game, Mafia. The Werewolf game appeared in many forms before Bézier Games published Ultimate Werewolf in 2008.

== Gameplay ==
Ultimate Werewolf can be played with 5 to 75 players of all ages. Each player has an agenda: as a villager, hunt down the werewolves; as a werewolf, convince the other villagers that you are innocent, while secretly attacking those same villagers each night. A third major team working to kill off all others are the Vampires, who must kill both werewolves and villagers to win, and other neutral roles are available, each vying to achieve their own goals. Dozens of special roles are available to help both the villagers and the werewolves achieve their goals.

The game has 12 unique roles being a set of sixteen fully illustrated cards, a moderator score pad to keep track of games, and a comprehensive game guide. (Sometimes packages come with a free poster.)

== Expansion packs ==
- Ultimate Werewolf: Classic Movie Monsters
- Ultimate Werewolf: Night Terrors
- Ultimate Werewolf: Artifacts
- Ultimate Werewolf: Urban Legends
- Ultimate Werewolf: Wolfpack
- Ultimate Werewolf: Hunting Party

== One Night Ultimate Werewolf ==
One Night Ultimate Werewolf, published by Bézier Games, is based on a similar concept to Ultimate Werewolf although the differences are significant enough to change the style and feel of gameplay. The most notable difference between the two is that in One Night Ultimate Werewolf gameplay develops over a single "night", with only one round of plot development, voting and elimination. As such, games are typically time limited to a small number of minutes with players opting to play successive, unrelated games. This approach makes individual games shorter, does not exclude players who are eliminated early in the game (as in Ultimate Werewolf) and often prompts faster paced games.

One Night Ultimate Werewolf also provides a smartphone app taking the role of the moderator, available on both iOS and Android platforms. The primary role of the app is to read out the moderator script, relieving the need for one of the players to take this impartial role, as required in Ultimate Werewolf.

=== Editions ===
Like Werewolf, a number of extension packs exist for One Night Ultimate Werewolf. One Night Ultimate Daybreak, One Night Ultimate Vampire and two bonus packs comprise additional character roles that can be used instead of or in combination with the roles from One Night Ultimate Werewolf. The One Night smartphone app enables players to include roles from any edition in a single game and adjusts the moderator script accordingly.

Bézier games has released more games in the One Night Ultimate series: One Night Ultimate Alien and One Night Ultimate Super Villains.

A legacy version of the game, Ultimate Werewolf Legacy, was published in 2018.

=== One Night roles ===
There is a general overlap between the roles of Ultimate Werewolf and One Night Ultimate Werewolf; however, the details of characters vary, largely stemming from the differences between the two games. For example, the Doppelgänger role in Ultimate Werewolf takes on the role of the character they have chosen only if that character dies. In Ultimate Werewolf, the Doppelgänger can then take action in the subsequent night phases of the game. This is in contrast to the Doppelgänger role of One Night Ultimate Werewolf, which, because of the single-round nature of game, immediately takes on the role of the player they have chosen and behaves as if they were that role during the night phase.

== Reception ==
One Night Ultimate Werewolf has been well received by critics as a shorter alternative to the original Werewolf game, that also fixes the problem of player elimination and makes the game more interesting for the villager players. The expansions have also been well received for introducing new and interesting player roles.

In a review of Ultimate Werewolf in Black Gate, Andrew Zimmerman Jones said "Will the village kill a werewolf, or will the werewolves fool the villagers into killing an innocent? This continues until either all werewolves are dead, or enough villagers have been killed that they no longer outnumber the werewolves."

The game was nominated for a BoardGameGeek Golden Geek Best Party Board Game Award in 2009.
