= The Hunteress =

Cazadora
- Theatrical release poster
- Directed by: Martín Duplaquet
- Written by: Valeria Hofmann; Antonio Luco
- Produced by: Francisca Barraza; Martín Duplaquet
- Starring: Natalia Reddersen; Willy Semler; Felipe Valenzuela; Alexandra Von Hummel
- Cinematography: Werner Giesen
- Edited by: Camila Mercadal
- Music by: Sebastián Duplaquet
- Production companies: Funky Films; Muvicenter; Plataforma Post
- Distributed by: Storyboard Media
- Release dates: August 2022 (SANFIC); January 19, 2023 (Chile)
- Running time: 72 minutes
- Country: Chile
- Language: Spanish

The Hunteress (Spanish: Cazadora) is a 2022 Chilean science fiction psychological thriller film directed by Martín Duplaquet and written by Valeria Hofmann & Antonio Luco. Starring Natalia Reddersen, Willy Semler, Felipe Valenzuela and Alexandra Von Hummel.

== Synopsis ==
Emilia (40) and her son Mateo (17) have survived a global plague. They live in the mountains, subsisting by hunting rabbits. One day, while out hunting, someone tries to steal their jeep. However, Emilia stops the vehicle with a shot. From the jeep emerges Rena (30), a mysterious woman whose arrival will awaken a series of latent feelings in the trio.

== Cast ==
The actors participating in this film are:

- Natalia Reddersen as Rena
- Willy Semler as Salvador
- Felipe Valenzuela as Mateo
- Alexandra Von Hummel as Emilia

== Production ==
Principal photography began in November 2020 in Farellones, Chile lasting 3 weeks.

== Release ==
The Hunteress had its initial premiere in August 2022 at the 18th Santiago International Film Festival. It had its commercial premiere on January 19, 2023, in Chilean theaters.
