= Bézier Games =

American tabletop game publisher

Bezier Games, Inc.
- Type: Private
- Industry: Game publisher
- Founded: 2006
- Founder: Ted Alspach
- Headquarters: Louisville, Tennessee, United States
- Key people: Ted Alspach
- Products: Werewords, Suburbia, Castles of Mad King Ludwig, Ultimate Werewolf, One Night Ultimate Werewolf, Silver
- Owner: Ted Alspach

Bézier Games, Inc. is a privately owned American tabletop game publisher, known by hobby gamers for Castles of Mad King Ludwig and Suburbia, and known to casual gamers for the One Night Ultimate Werewolf series, Werewords, the Silver series, and Ultimate Werewolf. It was founded in San Jose, California in 2006 by Ted Alspach upon publication of Start Player (also designed by Ted Alspach). In 2013, the company was renamed Bézier Games, Inc. when it incorporated. The company moved to Louisville, Tennessee in 2016 run by Ted & Toni Alspach.

Bézier Games produces a variety of board games and card games, specializing in medium weight strategy and social deduction party games. Several of their games have accompanying mobile applications that assist in gameplay, scorekeeping, or digital play. Their number one seller, One Night Ultimate Werewolf, is well known for this.

Bézier Games has received several awards for their games, including the Mensa Select award for Suburbia, Castles of Mad King Ludwig, and Favor of the Pharaoh. One Night Ultimate Werewolf was recommended by the Spiel des Jahres jury in 2015, and Werewords was a finalist for the Spiel des Jahres in 2019. Bézier Games’ products are distributed worldwide and licensed in over twenty different languages.

== Bezier Games, Inc. productions ==
- Start Player: A Kinda Collectible Card Game (2006) - Out of print, now published by Z-Man Games
- Ultimate Werewolf: Whitebox Edition (2007)
- Rapscallion (2008)
- Smarty Party Gamer's Expansion (2008)
- Ubongo Extrem Craxy Expansion (2008)
- Ultimate Werewolf: Ultimate Edition (2008, 2010)
- Beer & Pretzels (2009)
- Ultimate Werewolf: Classic Movie Monsters (2010)
- Ultimate Werewolf: Compact Edition (2010)
- Perpetual-Motion Machine (2010)
- TieBreaker (2011)
- Ultimate Werewolf: Night Terrors (2011)
- Ultimate Werewolf Artifacts (2011)
- Mutant Meeples (2012)
- Enter The Passage (2012)
- Suburbia (2012)
- Ultimate Werewolf: Urban Legends (2013)
- You Suck (2013)
- Ultimate Werewolf: Inquisition (2013)
- Suburbia Inc (2013)
- One Night Ultimate Werewolf (2014)
- Ultimate Werewolf (2014)
- Ultimate Werewolf: Deluxe Edition (2014)
- Ultimate Werewolf: Wolfpack (2014)
- Ultimate Werewolf: Kickstarter Edition (2014)
- Subdivision (2014)
- Castles of Mad King Ludwig (2014)
- Start Player Express (2014)
- One Night Ultimate Werewolf Daybreak (2015)
- One Night Ultimate Werewolf Bonus Pack (2015)
- Suburbia 5 Star (2015)
- Favor of the Pharaoh (2015)
- Castles of Mad King Ludwig Secrets (2015)
- Terra (2015)
- One Night Ultimate Vampire (2016)
- One Night Ultimate Bonus Pack 2 (2016)
- America (2016)
- Colony (2016)
- One Night Ultimate Alien (2017)
- One Night Ultimate Bonus Pack 3 (2017)
- New York Slice (2017)
- Werewords (2017)
- Whistle Stop (2017)
- Ultimate Werewolf: Hunting Party (2017)
- The Palace of Mad King Ludwig (2017)
- Werebeasts (2018)
- Werebeasts Deluxe Edition (2018)
- Werewords Deluxe Edition (2018)
- Ultimate Werewolf Legacy (2018)
- Whistle Stop: Rocky Mountains Expansion (2018)
- One Week Ultimate Werewolf (2019)
- One Night Ultimate Super Villains (2019)
- CABO (2nd Edition) (2019)
- Silver (2019)
- Suburbia Collector's Edition (2019)
- Silver Bullet (2019)
- One Night Ultimate Super Heroes (2019)
- One Night Ultimate Bonus Roles (2019)
- CABO Deluxe Edition (2020)
- Silver Coin (2020)
- Suburbia: Expansions (2020)
- Whistle Mountain (2020)
- Silver Dagger (2020)
- Maglev Metro (2021)
- Ultimate Werewolf Extreme (2021)
- Ultimate Werewolf Bonus Roles (2021)
- Ultimate Werewolf Pro (2021)
- Castles of Mad King Ludwig Collector's Edition (2022)
- Sync or Swim (2022)
- Cat in the Box: Deluxe Edition (2022)
- Maglev Metro: Mechs & Monorails (2023)
- Maglev Metro: Moonbases & Mars (2023)
- Maglev Metro: London & Paris (2023)
- Scram! (2023)
- Castles of Mad King Ludwig: Renovations (2023)
- Castles of Mad King Ludwig: Expansions (2023)
- Blueprints of Mad King Ludwig (2024)
- Sandbag (2024)
- Xylotar (2024)
- Seers Catalog (2024)
- Rebel Princess (2024)
- Rebel Princess Deluxe Edition (2024)
- The Search for UAPs (2024)
- Colossal Cat in the Box (2024)
- Silver Collector's Edition (2024)
- Silver Eye (2024)
- Silver Fang (2024)
- Rebel Princess: Happily Never After (2025)
- Xylotar Unhinged (2025)
- Scream! (2025)
- Maglev Metro: Barcelona & Chicago (2026)
- Maglev Metro: Ghost Train & Outback (2026)
- Maglev Metro: Nanobots Inc. & Nanotech University (2026)
- Zombie Princess (2026)
- Haunted Mouse (2026)
- Haunted Mouse: It's a Trap! (2026)
- The Game Makers (2026)
- Warp 99 (2026)
- Warp 99: Hyperdrive (2026)
- Age of Steam and Steam Expansions

1830s Pennsylvania & Northern California (2006)
Sun & London (2006)
Disco Inferno & Soul Train (2006)
Mississippi Steamboats & Golden Spike (2007)
America & Europe (2007)
Barbados & St. Lucia (2007)
Jamaica & Puerto Rico (2007)
Essen Spiel Limited Edition & Secret Blueprints of Steam #3 (2008)
Secret Blueprints of Steam 1 & 2 (2008)
Vermont, New Hampshire & Central New England (2008)
Alabama Railways, Antebellum Louisiana & Four Corners (2009)
1867 Georgia Reconstruction, South Carolina & Oklahoma Land Rush (2009)
Beer & Pretzels: The Train Game Expansion (2009)
California Gold Rush & Underground Railroad (2010)
Amazon Rainforest & Sahara Desert (2010)
Atlantis & Trisland (2010)
Sharing & Really Friendly Sharing (2010)
Australia & Tasmania (2011)
Outer Space & Reversteam (2011)
African Diamond Mines & Taiwan Cube Factories (2011)
Orient Express & Disoriented Express (2011)
