= Game Market =

Japanese gaming convention

Coordinates: 35°37′51″N 139°47′48″E

- Status: Active
- Venue: Tokyo Big Sight
- Locations: Ariake, Tokyo and Osaka
- Country: Japan
- Inaugurated: April 2, 2000
- Attendance: 29,300 in 2019 Autumn
- Major events: Marketplace, Gaming space
- Website: www.gamemarket.jp

Game Market (ゲームマーケット) is a Japanese gaming convention featuring "analog games" that do not require electricity, such as board games and card games. The event was first held in Tokyo on April 2, 2000. It is currently held at Tokyo Big Sight twice a year, in spring and autumn, and also once a year in Osaka. The event has seen a rise in popularity, with attendance at the Tokyo event increasing from 2,200 in March 2010 to 7,200 in October 2014, 8,500 in May 2015, 9,500 in November 2015, and 29,300 in 2019.

== Overview ==
As the event is limited to games that do not require electricity, a relatively minor genre within the gaming community, Game Market hosts booths operated by both commercial businesses and enthusiast groups.

The event is attended by many families and couples, and there are many booths aimed at young children and free spaces to be used as play areas. There is also a prohibition on the exhibition of adult games.

Booths operated by industry stakeholders such as Hobby Japan, Adventure Planning Service and Group SNE showcase visits by prominent game creators such as Hitoshi Yasuda and Ginichiro Suzuki. Some companies from overseas, such as Alderac Entertainment Group also attend, due to their distribution of Japanese hobby games outside of Japan.

In 2010, the convention went from being organized by a group of volunteers to being managed by Arclight, which involved significant changes to the management system.

=== Past venues ===
- 2000: Kanda, Tokyo (Kanda Panse)
- 2001–2012: Asakusa, Tokyo (Taito Ward Hall, Tokyo Metropolitan Industrial Trade Center)

=== Current venues ===
==== Game Market Tokyo ====
- 2013–: Ariake, Tokyo (Tokyo Big Sight west area, east area)

A move from Taito Ward Hall to a larger venue had been planned for 2014, but the success of the 2012 convention and the support of Bushiroad prompted an earlier move in 2013 to Tokyo Big Sight West Hall 3.

==== Game Market Osaka ====
- 2012-2014: Osaka Merchandise Mart.
- 2015 (March 1): Hanamizuki Hall (Aqua Hall) in Tsurumi Ryokuchi Park.

==== Game Market Kobe ====
The first Game Market Kobe was scheduled to be held at the Kobe International Exhibition Hall on 21 February 2016.

== Main types of games ==
The convention features only analog games that do not use electricity, in the following main genres:

- War games
- Card games
- Simulation games
- Role-playing games (pen & paper)
- Board games
- Traditional games (such as go and shogi)
- Collectible card games(from 2015 Spring)

The analog games displayed can include dōjinshi (fan fiction) and self-created games, including commercial games. The games are displayed in booths that may be run by clubs or companies. In recent years, some booths have displayed game-related goods such as miniature figurines and accessories. The exhibition venue includes a space for attendees to play with games they have bought. Booth organizers have the option of applying for a play space next to their booth where participants can try out games.

== Past events ==
Bid auction
Public auction
Both auctions not the organizers of royalty.
Bazar
Individual participants, to sell the goods in a format similar to Flea market.
Stamp Rally
Traditional game experience
I can experience the traditional game in the world. So far, Domino, Backgammon, Texas Hold'em, ja:投扇興, Carrom, ja:うんすんカルタ, ja:ごいた, Draughts, Renju experience meetings opened.
Korean companies exhibitors
2008–2009, Korean board game company has exhibited with their own booths.

== Photos ==
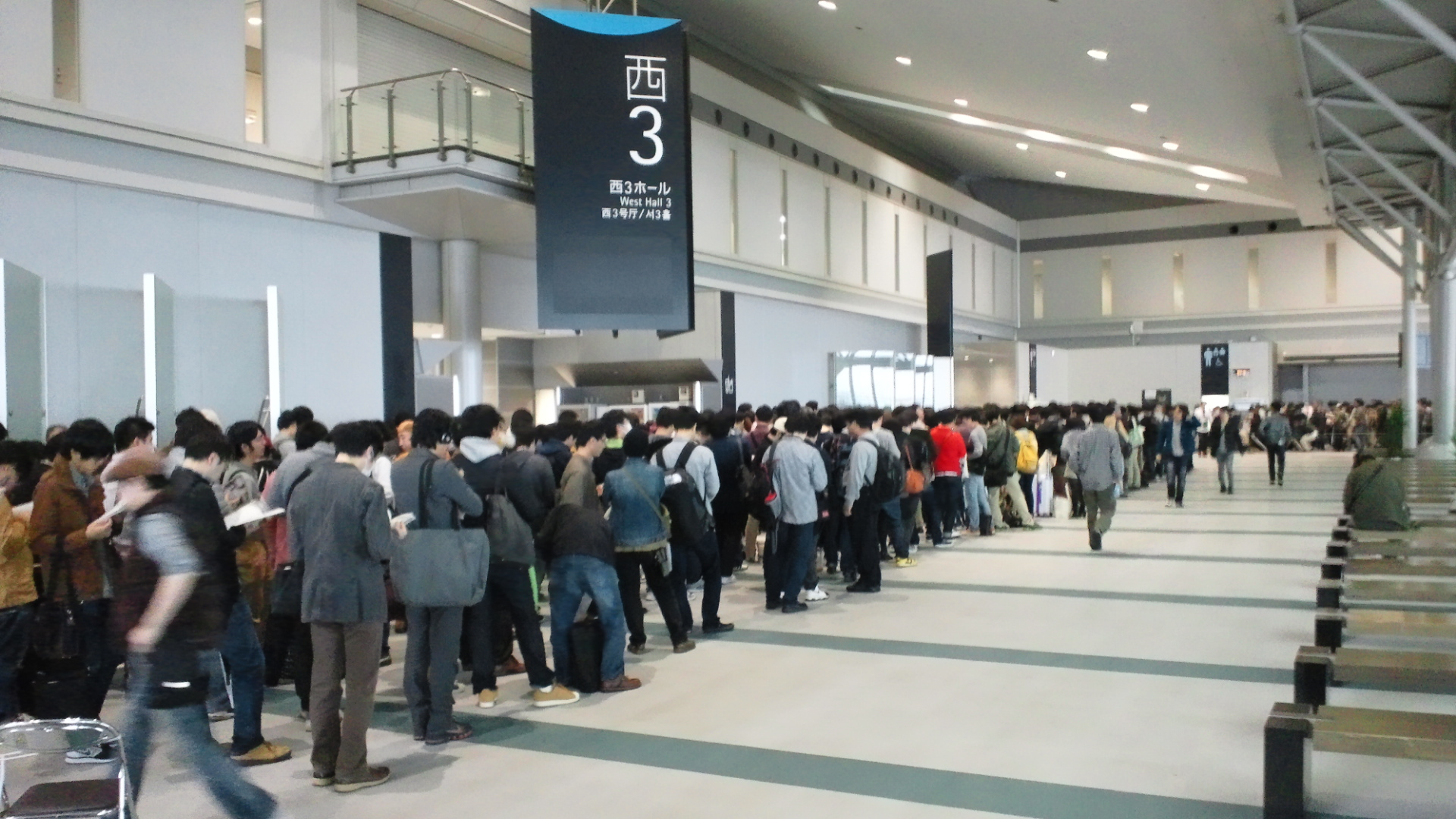
Game Market 2013 Autumn of the venue before the participants wait column. This waiting column is the opening just before ranged up to the outside of the building.

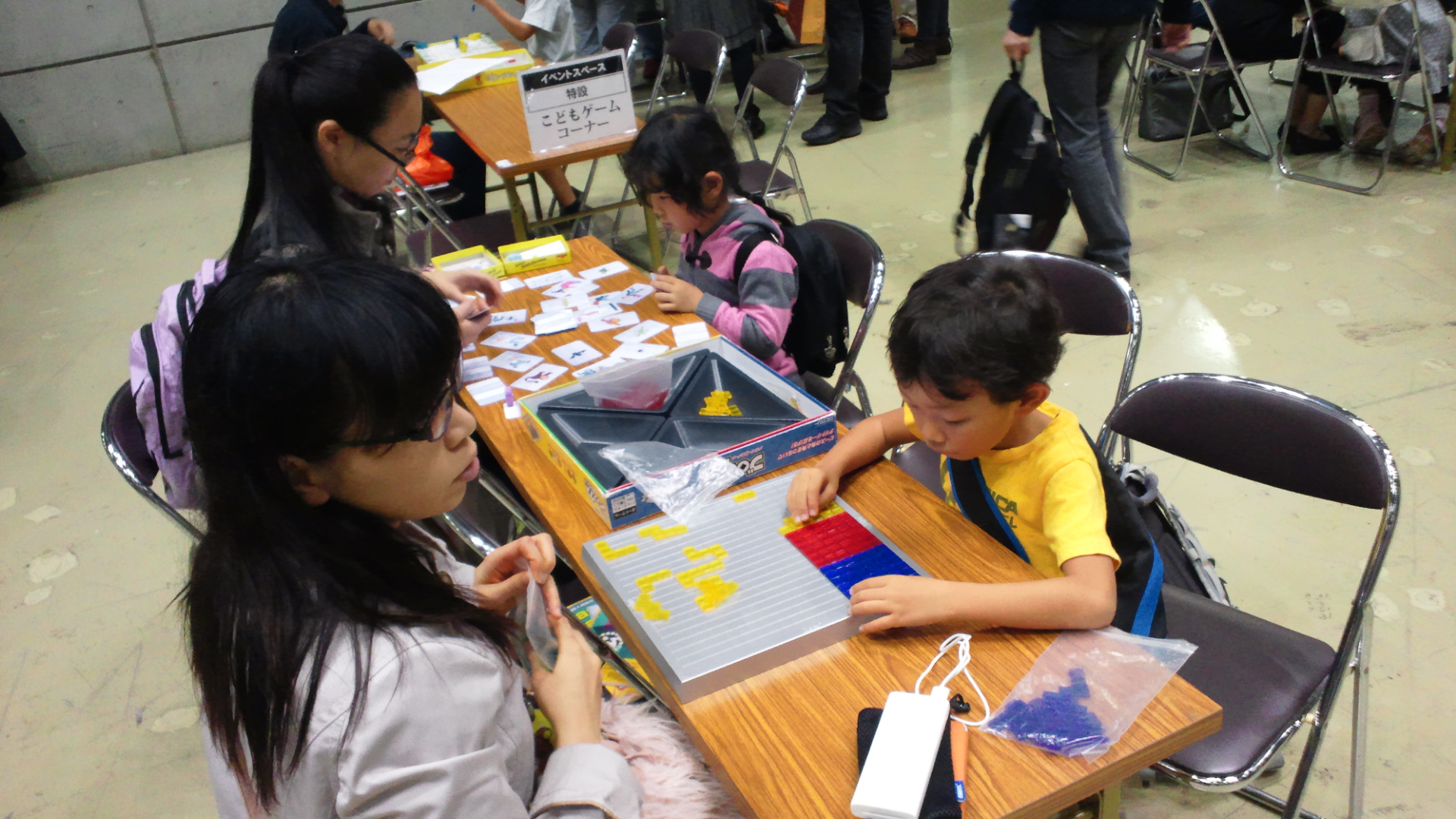
Parents and children to enjoy a board game in the "Children's Game Corner"

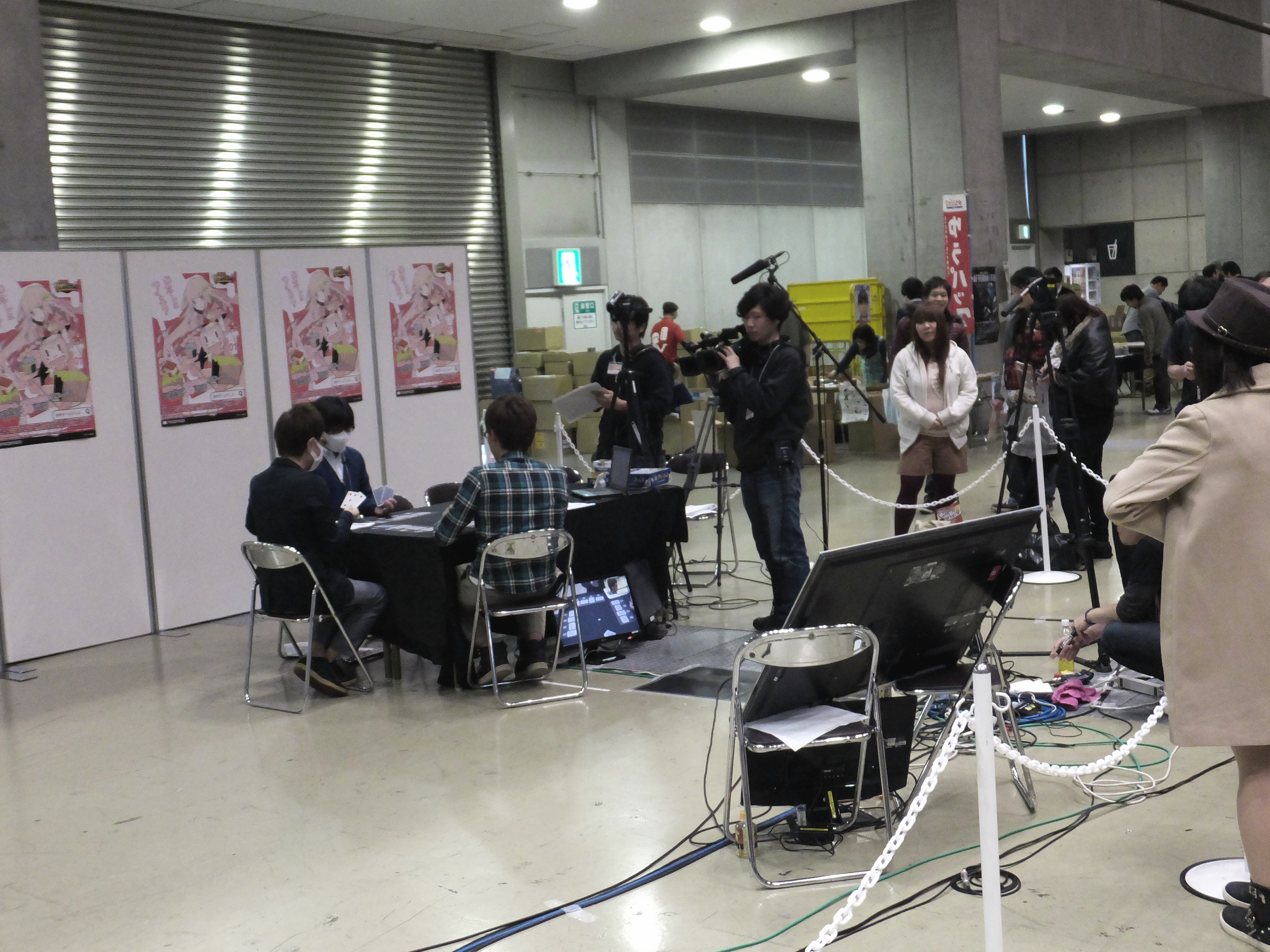
The board game play live spectacle by Niconico live in the venue

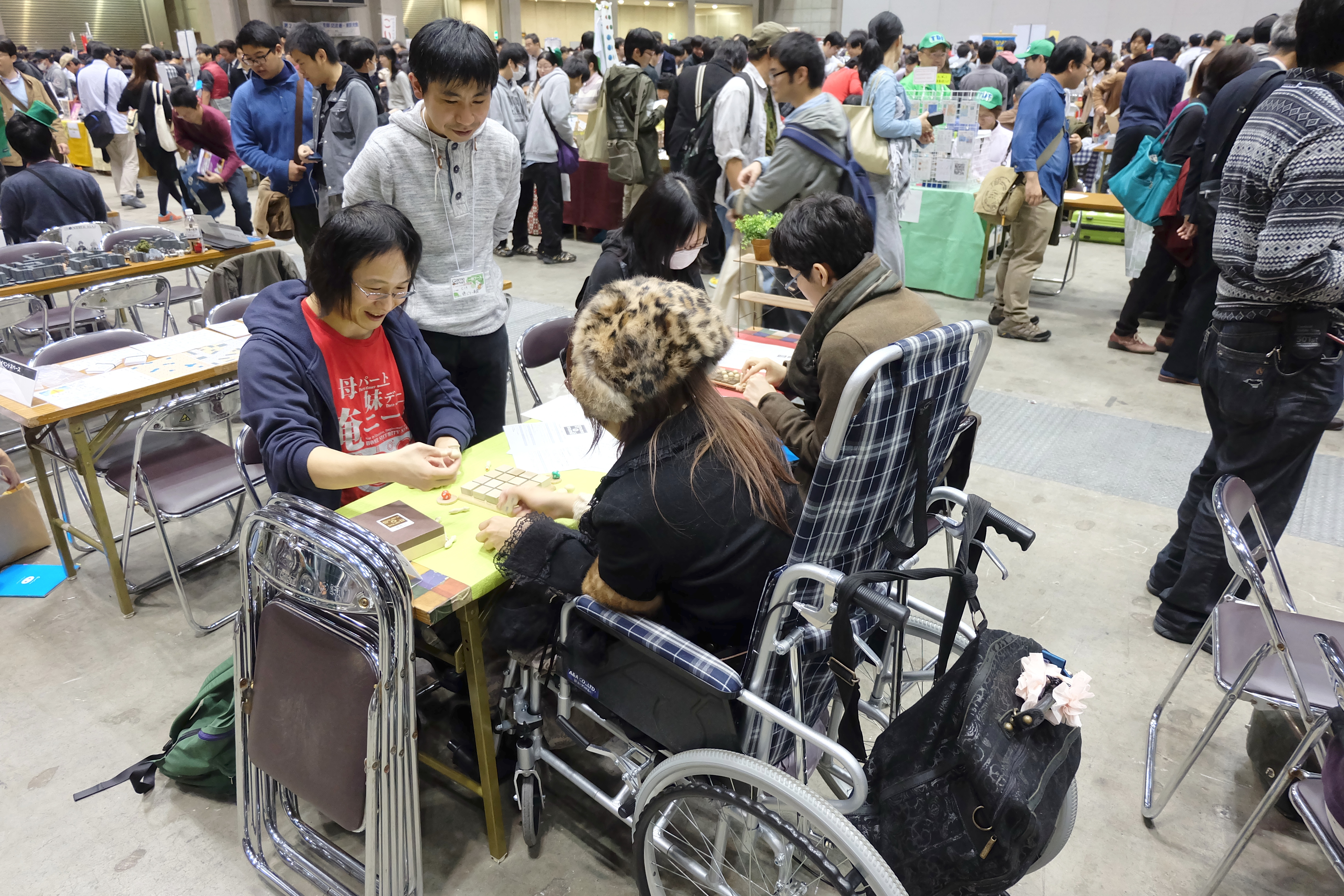
Card game playing with disabled person

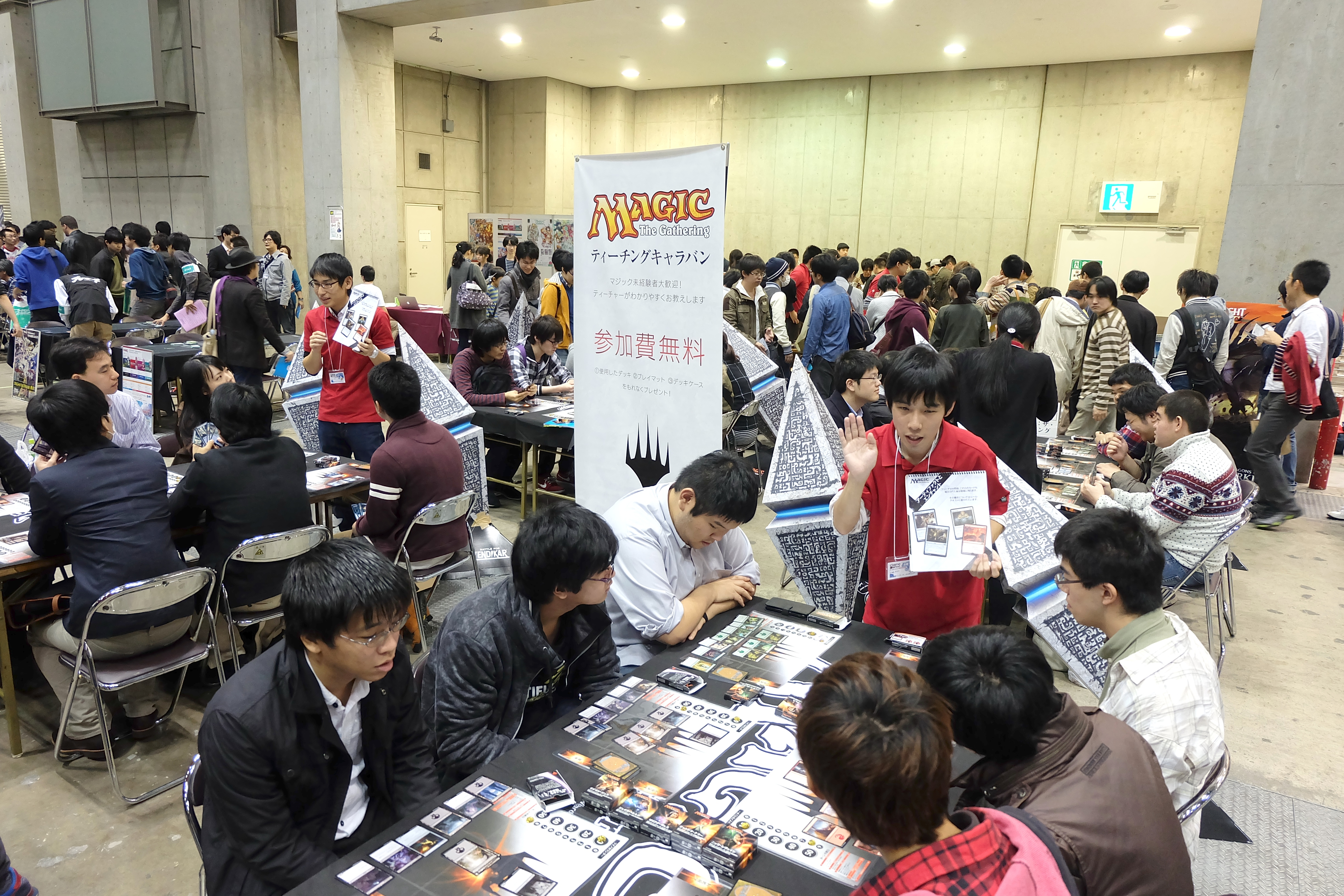
Magic: the Gathering teaching caravan by Wizards of the Coast, free promotion decks distributed.

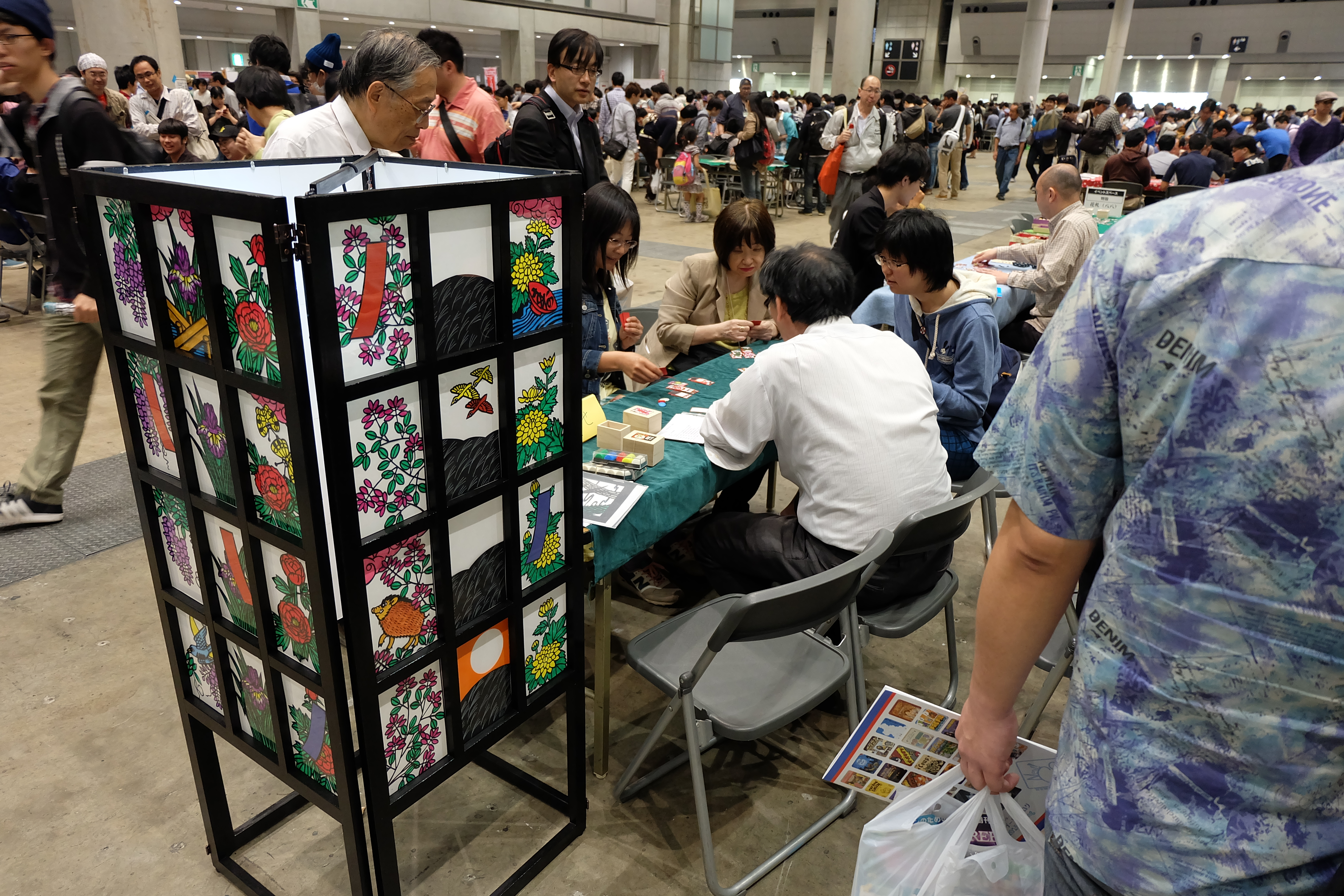
Japanese traditional card game Hanafuda experience play corner

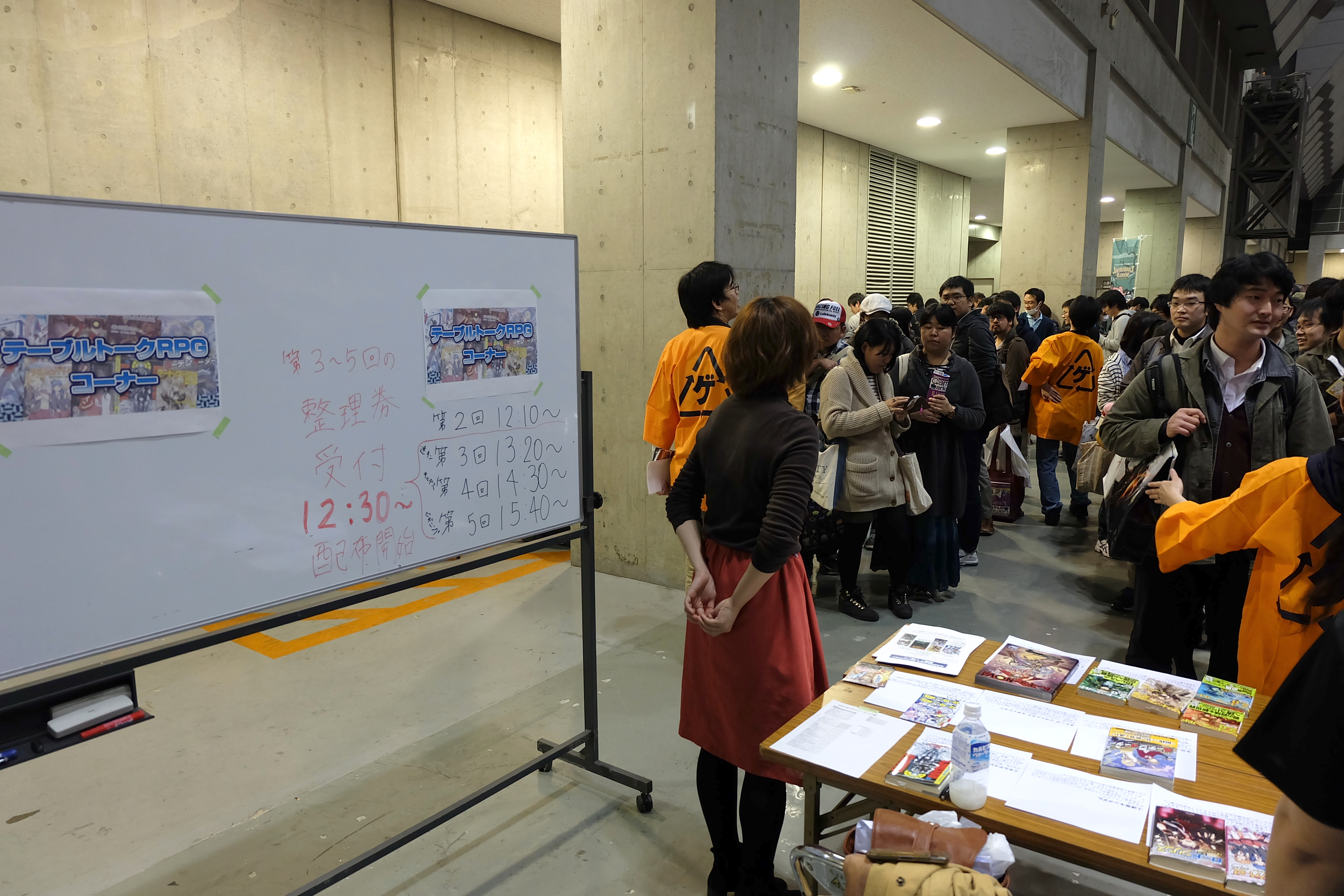
Role-playing games experience play corner,6 games could be played by one hour.

== See also ==
- Spiel
- Origins Game Fair
- Gen Con
