= Elastic Press =

British small press

Elastic Press was a British small press specialising in single-author short story collections. It was run by Andrew Hook between November 2002 and November 2008 and was based in Norwich.

In 2005 and 2009 Elastic received British Fantasy Awards for Best Small Press. They also won the British Fantasy Society Best Anthology award in 2005, 2006, and 2007. In 2008, their title Other Voices by Andrew Humphrey won an East Anglian Book award. In 2009, their title The Turing Test by Chris Beckett won the Edge Hill Short Story Prize, beating many Booker-nominated authors to do so.

In 2017 NewCon Press published an anthology Elasticity - The Best of Elastic Press edited by Andrew Hook as an A5 paperback and a numbered limited edition hardback signed by the editor.

== Books Published by Elastic Press ==
- Six Silly Stories by Geoffrey Maloney
- Subtle Edens: An Anthology of Slipstream Fiction edited by Allen Ashley
- The Turing Test by Chris Beckett
- The Last Reef by Gareth L Powell
- Binding Energy by Daniel Marcus
- Another Santana Morning by Mike Dolan
- Other Voices by Andrew Humphrey
- The Cusp of Something by Jai Clare
- That's Entertainment by Robert Neilson
- Going Back by Tony Richards
- So Far, So Near by Mat Coward
- Photocopies of Heaven by Maurice Suckling
- Extended Play edited by Gary Couzens
- Unbecoming by Mike O'Driscoll
- The Ephemera by Neil Williamson
- The Last Days of Johnny North by David Swann
- The English Soil Society by Tim Nickels
- Trailer Park Fairy Tales by Matt Dinniman
- The Life To Come by Tim Lees
- The Elastic Book of Numbers, an anthology edited by Allen Ashley
- Visits To The Flea Circus by Nick Jackson
- Angel Road by Steven Savile
- Somnambulists by Allen Ashley
- The Sound of White Ants by Brian Howell
- Jung's People by Kay Green
- The Alsiso Project, anthology edited by Andrew Hook
- Milo and I by Antony Mann
- Sleepwalkers by Marion Arnott
- Second Contact by Gary Couzens
- Open The Box by Andrew Humphrey
- The Virtual Menagerie by Andrew Hook
