= Ian McDonald bibliography =

List of works by or about the British author Ian McDonald.

== Novels ==
=== Desolation Road series ===
- Desolation Road (1988)
- The Luncheonette of Lost Dreams (1992) (short story)
- Ares Express (2001)

=== Chaga saga ===
- "Toward Kilimanjaro" (1990) (short story)
- Chaga (1995, US: Evolution's Shore)
- Kirinya (1997)
- "Tendeléo's Story" (2000) (short story)

=== India in 2047 ===
- River of Gods (2004)
- The Djinn's Wife (2006) in Asimov's Science Fiction – Hugo Award for Best Novelette winner

=== Everness series ===
- Planesrunner (2011)
- Be My Enemy (2012)
- Empress of the Sun (2014)

=== Luna series ===
- New Moon (2015) - BSFA award nominee, winner of the Gaylactic Spectrum Award
- Wolf Moon (2017)
- Moon Rising (2019)

=== Standalone novels ===
- Out on Blue Six (1989)
- King of Morning, Queen of Day (1991)
- Hearts, Hands and Voices (1992, US: The Broken Land)
- Necroville (1994, US: Terminal Café)
- Scissors Cut Paper Wrap Stone (1994) - 2013 e-book includes The Tear
- Sacrifice of Fools (1996)
- Brasyl (2007) – Hugo Award nominee, winner of the BSFA award, Nominated for the £50,000 Warwick Prize for Writing
- The Dervish House (2010) – Hugo Award nominee, Clarke Award nominee, winner of the BSFA award
- Time Was (2018)
- Hopeland (2023)
- The Wilding (2024)
- Boy, with Accidental Dinosaur (2026)

== Graphic novels ==
- Kling Klang Klatch (1992) (graphic novel, illustrated by David Lyttleton)

== Short fiction ==
=== Collections ===
- Empire Dreams (1988)
- Speaking in Tongues (1992)
- Cyberabad Days (2009)
- The Best of Ian McDonald (2015)

=== Short stories ===
- "The Islands of the Dead" (1982)
- "The Catharine Wheel" (Our Lady of Tharsis) (1984) (also published as "The Catharine Wheel")
- "Christian" (1984)
- "Scenes from a Shadowplay" (1985)
- "Empire Dreams" (1985)" (also appeared as: Empire Dreams; Ground Control to Major Tom)
- "Approaching Perpendicular" (1988)
- "Radio Marrakech" (1988)
- "The Island of the Dead" (1988)
- "Unfinished Portrait of the King of Pain by Van Gogh" (1988)
- "Visits to Remarkable Cities" (1988)
- "Vivaldi" (1988)
- "King of Morning, Queen of Day" (1988)
- "Gardenias" (1989)
- "Rainmaker Cometh" (1989)
- "Listen" (1989)
- "Atomic Avenue" (1990)
- "Speaking in Tongues" (1990)
- "Winning" (1990)
- "Fronds" (1990)
- "Toward Kilimanjaro" [Chaga] (1990)
- "Floating Dogs" (1991)
- "King of Morning, Queen of Day" (excerpt)" (1991)
- "Fragments of an Analysis of a Case of Hysteria" (1991)
- "Brody Loved the Masai Woman" (1992)
- "Innocents" (1992)
- "The Best and the Rest of James Joyce" (1992)
- "Fat Tuesday" (1992)
- "Big Chair" (1992)
- "Legitimate Targets" (1993)
- "Some Strange Desire" (1993)
- "The Undifferentiated Object of Desire" (1993)
- "Blue Motel" (1994)
- "Scissors Cut Paper Wrap Stone" (1994)
- "Steam" (1995)
- "The Time Garden: A Faery Story" (1995)
- "Frooks" (1995)
- "Faithful" (1996)
- "Islington" (1996)
- "Recording Angel" (1996)
- "The Further Adventures of Baron Munchausen: The Gulf War" (1996)
- "Jesus' Blood Never Failed Me Yet" (1997)
- "The Five O'Clock Whistle" (1997)
- "After Kerry" (1997)
- "The Days of Solomon Gursky" (1998)
- "Breakfast on the Moon, with Georges" (1999)
- "Tendeléo's Story" [Chaga] (2000)
- "The Twenty Five Mile High Club" (2002)
- "The Old Cosmonaut and the Construction Worker Dream of Mars" (2002)
- "The Hidden Place" (2002)
- "Written in the Stars" (2005) in Constellations
- "The Little Goddess" (2005)
- "Kyle Meets the River" (2006)
- "Sanjeev and Robotwallah" (2007)
- "Verthandi's Ring" (2007)
- "The Tear" (2008)
- "[A Ghost Samba]" (2008)
- "The Dust Assassin" (2008)
- "An Eligible Boy" (2008)
- "Vishnu at the Cat Circus" (2009)
- "A Little School" (2009)
- "Tonight We Fly" (2010)
- "Digging" (2011)
- "A Smart Well-Mannered Uprising of the Dead" (2011)
- "Driftings" (2013)
- "The Queen of the Night's Aria" (2013) in Old Mars (anthology)
- "The Revolution Will Not Be Refrigerated" (2013) in Twelve Tomorrows 2014 (anthology)
- "Nanonauts! In Battle with Tiny Death-subs!" (2014) in Robot Uprisings (anthology)
- "The Fifth Dragon" (2014, novelette) in Reach for Infinity (anthology)
- "Botanica Veneris: Thirteen Papercuts by Ida Countess Rathangan" (2015) in Old Venus (anthology)

== Critical studies and reviews of McDonald's work ==
- Clute, John, & Nicholls, Peter (eds). The Encyclopedia of Science Fiction. New York: St Martin's Press, 1993. ISBN 0-312-09618-6.
- Lennard, John, Ian McDonald: Chaga / Evolution's Shore. Tirril: Humanities-Ebooks, 2007.
- Spinrad, Norman (April–May 2013). "Doors to anywhere". On Books. Asimov's Science Fiction. 37 (4&5): 183–191. Reviews Planesrunner.
