= Redeployment (short story collection) =

2014 short story collection by Phil Klay

- Author: Phil Klay
- Language: English
- Subject: Iraq War (2003–2010)
- Genre: Historical Fiction
- Publisher: Penguin Press
- Publication date: March 4, 2014
- Publication place: United States
- Media type: Print
- Pages: 291 pp
- ISBN: 9781594204999
- OCLC: 852221707

Redeployment is a collection of short stories by American writer Phil Klay. His first published book, it won the 2014 National Book Award for Fiction and the National Book Critics Circle's 2014 John Leonard Award given for a best first book in any genre.

== Background ==
The book consists of twelve stories that chronicle the experiences of soldiers and veterans who served during the Iraq War, specifically Operation Iraqi Freedom (2003 – 2010). Klay served in the United States Marine Corps from 2005 to 2009. He was deployed to the Anbar Province in 2007–8.

Klay has said that before and during his service in Iraq he did not have a "clear sense" that he was going to write about war, but that when he shared his plan to enter the military upon graduation, his Dartmouth College teacher and mentor, the American poet Tom Sleigh:

"...made sure that before I went I'd read Tolstoy, Hemingway, Isaac Babel and David Jones. He thought it important to study what the greatest minds had to say about war."

Klay spent four years writing Redeployment. The book's title story first appeared in the literary magazine Granta. It was reprinted in Fire and Forget: Short Stories from the Long War, an anthology of war fiction. Klay has stated that the process of writing the stories that became Redeployment involved years of meticulous research.

Klay has described his own deployment in Iraq as "a mild experience" where he did not see the war itself but only the effects of war second hand. To depict the war, he created a dozen characters, each with a different set of experiences and perspectives. Avoiding cliches and creating "prototypes", he has said, "was something I took very seriously. I did a lot a research, I talked to a lot of Marines, and spent a lot of time thinking about the subjects. Doing the kind of imaginative work, drafting stories over and over again until I had something that felt emotionally honest, which is also not the same as something that's going to please everyone who’s been through that experience." He said he needed multiples voices because:

...each person has such a small piece of the war, and that piece will be powerfully shaped not only by when they were there and where in Iraq they were, but also by what job they did. So rather than writing a unified novel about the experience of war, I wanted twelve different voices—voices that would approach similar themes but from very different perspectives. I don't think all my narrators would get along with each other. I don't think they'd agree with each other about what the war meant. And part of my intent was that that would open a space for the reader to come in and critically engage with the sorts of claims the narrators are making.... Also, it's just fascinating to me to step into very different heads. What was the war like for a mortuary affairs specialist? For a chaplain? For an artilleryman, who never sees the bodies of the enemy he has killed?

He said he had some models in mind of what he did not want to do: "There have been a couple books in the last couple years with almost comical misrepresentations of the military by authors who wanted to talk about Iraq, but clearly didn't want to do the hard work of learning enough about the subject to have something worth saying." Klay included in Redeployment a list of works he read and found valuable in helping to shape his writing. He explained that:

...before writing about a foreign service officer I read a memoir by one who'd served in Iraq, a fairly wonky book about career diplomacy, a lot of Special Inspector General for Iraq Reconstruction reports, and so on. I also read a Czech World War I novel that seemed appropriate to gear me up, in terms of tone, and I talked to Civil Affairs soldiers and Foreign Service Officers, and I read a lot of journalism. Not everything I read was about war. Bernanos's Diary of a Country Priest and Edward P. Jones's The Known World and Nathan Englander's short stories, for example, were all very helpful at different points for different stories.

== Contents ==
Story	Originally published in
"Redeployment"	Granta
"FRAGO "	Original
"After Action Report"	Tin House
"Bodies"	Original
"OIF"	Original
"Money as a Weapons System"	Original
"In Vietnam They Had Whores"	Original
"Prayer in the Furnace"	Original
"Psychological Operations"	Original
"War Stories"	Original
"Unless It's a Sucking Chest Wound"	Original
"Ten Kliks South"	a portion in Guernica

== Reception ==
In the New York Times, Dexter Filkins wrote: "It's the best thing written so far on what the war did to people’s souls." In The Guardian, Edward Docx wrote:

[I]t is definitely in the combined effect of the stories that Redeployment garners its power and earns the comparisons to Tim O'Brien's writing on Vietnam that it has been getting in America. Indeed, Klay's gifts become more apparent with each new narrator and circumstance: his reach, his tonal control, his observational sophistication, the sheer emotional torque of his narratives. By the end, he had convincingly inhabited more than a dozen different voices and I felt I had learned more about Iraq than in any documentary or factual account.

Writing in the Daily Beast, Brian Castner described the book "a clinic in the profanities of war". He wrote:

If there is a flaw to be found here it is only one of narrowness; all of these narrators are American men and most are Marines. But the voices are strong and varied, and we hear from enlisted men and officers, chaplains and lawyers, State Department do-gooders and college students, and, of course, many grunts. The book contains plenty of blood-dead-hajji-fuck-kill-love, but also stories that violate innocence and faith itself. If obscenity scrapes just the skin then through the narrative arc of tragedy and suffering Klay has managed to dig down to the organs.

On November 19, Redeployment received the 2014 National Book Award for fiction. The judges described it as a "brutal, piercing sometimes darkly funny collection" that "stakes Klay's claim for consideration as the quintessential storyteller of America's Iraq conflict." In his acceptance speech, he said: "I can't think of a more important conversation to be having — war's too strange to be processed alone. I want to thank everyone who picked up the book, who read it and decided to join the conversation." National Public Radio reported that:

Across a dozen stories told in first-person, Redeployment is at its heart a meditation on war — and the responsibility that everyone, especially the average citizen, bears for it.

The New York Times included Redeployment on its list of the "Ten Best Books of 2014". On January 19, 2015 it was announced by the National Book Critics Circle that Redeployment received its 2014 John Leonard Award for "a best first book published in any genre."

In May 2015 The Chautauqua Institute announced that Redeployment won the 2015 Chautauqua Prize. The Chautauqua Prize is awarded annually to commemorate a book of fiction or literary/narrative nonfiction that provides a richly rewarding reading experience and honors the author for a significant contribution to the literary arts.

In June 2015, the American Library Association announced that Klay's Redeployment was the 2015 recipient of the W. Y. Boyd Literary Award for Excellence in Military Fiction. In November 2015, Redeployment was awarded the Warwick Prize for Writing for 2015.
