= Rebecca Goss =

Rebecca Goss may refer to:

- Rebecca Goss (poet)
- Rebecca Goss (chemist)
