= Out on Blue Six =

Out on Blue Six may refer to:

- Out on Blue Six (show), BBC Radio One show
- Out on Blue Six (novel), written by Ian McDonald
