= Warwick Prize =

Warwick Prize may refer to:

- Warwick Prize for Women in Translation
- Warwick Prize for Writing
