= Phil Klay =

American writer (born 1983)

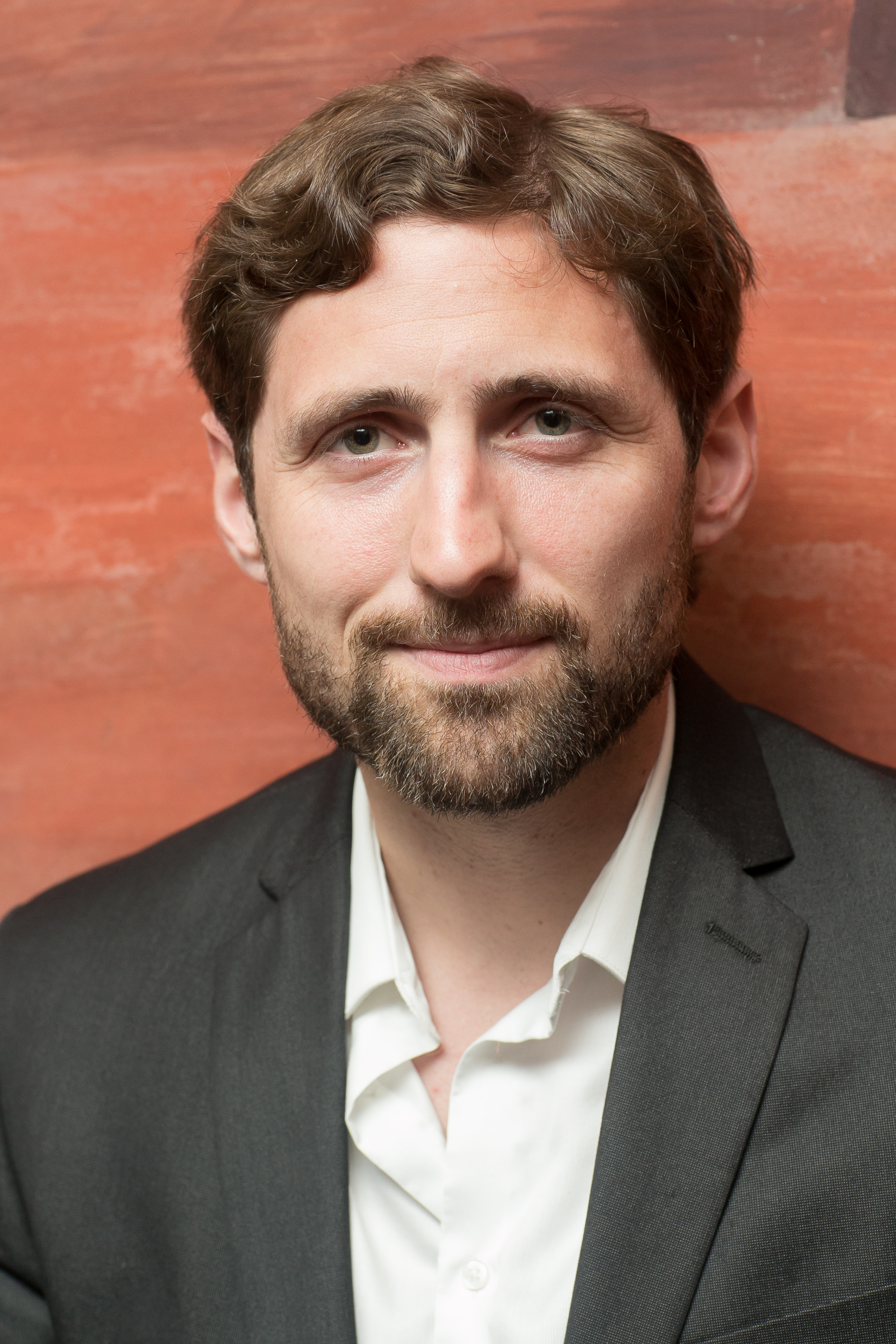
- Klay at the 2015 PEN Literary Awards Ceremony
- Born: 1983 (age 42–43); Westchester, New York, U.S.
- Education: Dartmouth College; Hunter College (MFA)
- Occupation: Writer
- Writing career
- Subjects: Combat, military affairs
- Notable work: Redeployment
- Notable awards: National Book Award for fiction
- Website: philklay.com

Phil Klay (/ˈkleɪ/ KLAY; born 1983) is an American writer. He won the National Book Award for fiction in 2014 for his first book-length publication, a collection of short stories, Redeployment. In 2014 the National Book Foundation named him a 5 under 35 honoree. His 2020 novel, Missionaries, was named as one of Barack Obama's favorite books of the year as well as one of The Wall Street Journal's Ten Best Books of the Year.

Klay was a United States Marine Corps officer from 2005 to 2009. In addition to other projects, he currently teaches in the MFA writing program at Fairfield University. On 17 September 2026, Phil Klay was named president of PEN America.

== Early life ==
Klay grew up in Westchester, New York, the son of Marie-Therese F. Klay and William D. Klay. His family background included several examples of public service. His maternal grandfather was a career diplomat and his father a Peace Corps volunteer; for years his mother worked in international medical assistance. He attended Regis High School in New York City, graduating in 2001.

== Education and military career ==
During the summer of 2004, while a student at Dartmouth College, where he played rugby and boxed, Klay attended Officer Candidate School in Quantico, Virginia. He graduated from Dartmouth College in 2005 and then joined the U.S. Marine Corps, where he was commissioned as a second lieutenant. He later explained that:

I knew we were going to war, and I joined for the reasons that many people serve. My family always had a strong respect for public service. I wanted to be part of a cause greater than myself. I was thinking of it as a historic moment, and I wanted to put myself in a position of responsibility so I could hopefully affect things for the better.

During the U.S. troop surge in Iraq, Klay served for thirteen months in Iraq from January 2007 to February 2008. He left the military in 2009 and then earned an M.F.A. in creative writing from Hunter College in 2011.

He described his time in the military as "a very mild deployment" as a Public Affairs Officer. Klay said that he wrote his collection of short stories based on his service and return to civilian life because:

...what I really want — and I think what a lot of veterans want — is a sense of serious engagement with the wars, because it's important, because it matters, because lives are at stake, and it's something we did as a nation. That's something that deserves to be thought about very seriously and very honestly, without resorting to the sort of comforting stories that allow us to tie a bow on the experience and move on.

Klay has objected to the way civilians distance themselves from military experience:

[V]eterans need an audience that is both receptive and critical. Believing war is beyond words is an abrogation of responsibility — it lets civilians off the hook from trying to understand, and veterans off the hook from needing to explain. You don't honor someone by telling them, "I can never imagine what you've been through." Instead, listen to their story and try to imagine being in it, no matter how hard or uncomfortable that feels.... [I]n the age of an all-volunteer military, it is far too easy for Americans to send soldiers on deployment after deployment without making a serious effort to imagine what that means.

He has described how "the gap between public mythology and lived experience" even affects both veteran-civilian dialogue and the veteran self-perception:

[T]he mythologies are part of the experience of war. Often, we use them to try to make sense of what we've been through. We signed up with all those stories in our heads, after all, and then we came home to all the stories about war our culture was telling itself. Trying to have a conversation with someone (or even an honest conversation with yourself) about your war experience is an exercise in navigating through all the cultural garbage that's out there.

The culture, according to Klay, presents hurdles to communication and a shared understanding:

One of the very strange things about coming home from the modern wars is you're coming home to a country where such a small percentage of the population is serving. You get a positive reception when people find out that you're a veteran, for the most part, but mostly what people feel very keenly is a kind of apathy: a disconnect from the fact that we're a nation at war. You come home and find out that the American people aren't really paying attention and that is profoundly strange. The ability to bridge that gap is important. Veterans don't want to feel isolated, and in order to do that you need to find some way of getting your memories and relationships to those memories across to someone whose notions of what you've been doing are very vague and defined frequently by a variety of clichés.

== Writing and teaching career ==
After Klay left active military service, he enrolled in Hunter College’s Creative Writing program, which was then under the directorship of his former professor, poet Tom Sleigh, whom Klay knew from the English department at Dartmouth. While completing his MFA at Hunter, Klay established important and vital artistic relationships with not only Sleigh, but also Peter Carey, Colum McCann, Claire Messud, Patrick McGrath, and Nathan Englander.

When he was named a Hertog Fellow at Hunter, Klay was able to sharpen his research skills assisting novelist Richard Ford with his novel Canada (2012). Ford personally thanked Klay on the “Acknowledgments” page of the latter novel, writing: “My thanks, too, to Philip Klay, who volunteered precious time to help me research this book.” All would be invaluable to Klay’s writing career, leading to his debut collection of short stories, Redeployment, published in March 2014.

Klay is a contributor to Granta. He has also reviewed fiction for The New York Times, The Washington Post, and Newsweek. His stories have appeared in collections as well, including The Best American Non-Required Reading 2012 (Mariner Books) and Fire and Forget (Da Capo Press, 2013). He has conducted several interviews with other writers and published them on The Rumpus.

Princeton University named him a Hodder Fellow for the 2015-2016 academic year. In 2018, he headed the five-member jury that awarded the first Aspen Words Literary Prize. In July 2018, Klay was named 2018 winner of the George W. Hunt, S.J., Prize for Journalism, Arts & Letters in the category Cultural & Historical Criticism.

Klay’s first novel, entitled Missionaries, was published by Penguin Press in October 2020. It was included on Barack Obama’s perennial list of his favorite books of the year.

As of 2022, Klay was a faculty member in the Masters of Fine Arts (MFA) creative writing program at Fairfield University.

In 2022, Klay returned a second time on the Storybound podcast for a special adaptation of his essay "Citizen Soldier".

Klay wrote a New York Times op-ed entitled "Trump Has Made a Fundamental Miscalculation about Iran" on March 22, 2026. It was published on the website and the New York edition of the print paper.

== Reception and recognition ==
Redeployment —Klay’s debut book publication— received immediate and positive recognition when it appeared. Writing in the Daily Beast, Brian Castner described the book "a clinic in the profanities of war". He wrote:

If there is a flaw to be found here it is only one of narrowness; all of these narrators are American men and most are Marines. But the voices are strong and varied, and we hear from enlisted men and officers, chaplains and lawyers, State Department do-gooders and college students, and, of course, many grunts. The book contains plenty of blood-dead-hajji-fuck-kill-love, but also stories that violate innocence and faith itself. If obscenity scrapes just the skin then through the narrative arc of tragedy and suffering Klay has managed to dig down to the organs.

In the New York Times, Pulitzer Prize-winning journalist Dexter Filkins wrote that "Klay succeeds brilliantly, capturing on an intimate scale the ways in which the war in Iraq evoked a unique array of emotion, predicament and heartbreak.... Iraq comes across not merely as a theater of war but as a laboratory for the human condition in extremis. Redeployment is ... the best thing written so far on what the war did to people’s souls."

In November 2014, Klay won the National Book Award for fiction for Redeployment. In his acceptance speech, he said: "I can't think of a more important conversation to be having — war's too strange to be processed alone. I want to thank everyone who picked up the book, who read it and decided to join the conversation." He was the first author to win the prize for his first book-length work of fiction since Julia Glass in 2002. He had been thought "something of a longshot" to win.

The New York Times included Redeployment on its list of the "Ten Best Books of 2014", and it received the National Book Critics Circle's 2014 John Leonard Award given for a best first book in any genre. In 2015, he received the James Webb Award for fiction dealing with Marines or Marine Corps life from the Marine Corps Heritage Foundation for Redeployment. In June 2015, Redeployment received the W.Y. Boyd Literary Award for Excellence in Military Fiction from the American Library Association.

== Family and personal life ==
Klay married Jessica Alvarez, an attorney, on February 15, 2014. They first met as students at Dartmouth. Together they have three sons.

Klay’s grandfather, Thomas Ryan Byrne, was U.S. ambassador to Norway and Czechoslovakia in the 1970s. Klay's older brother, Byrne Klay, is a musician in the band Megan Jean's Secret Family.

Klay names Colum McCann, author of Let the Great World Spin, as his "mentor". Klay describes himself as a Catholic and a fan of "the great Catholic literature–Flannery O'Connor, Francois Mauriac, Graham Greene, Evelyn Waugh".

Klay has said: "Religion and the tradition of Catholic thought... helps you ask the right kinds of questions about these issues... There's a type of religious sentiment that is very certain of the answers and very certain about what should be proselytized. And then there's another type of religious tradition which is really much more about... doubt and working your way towards more and more difficult questions. And I think that's the tradition that appeals to me."

== Selected bibliography ==
Fiction

- Redeployment. Penguin Books. 2014. ISBN 978-0143126829.
- Missionaries. Penguin Press. 2020. ISBN 978-1984880659.

Nonfiction

- Uncertain Ground: Citizenship in an Age of Endless, Invisible War. Penguin. 2022. ISBN 978-0593299241.

Essays and journalism

- "After War, a Failure of the Imagination'". New York Times. February 8, 2014.
- "Death and Memory". New York Times. October 28, 2010.
- "The Citizen-Soldier: Moral Risk and Modern Military". The Brookings Essay, May 24, 2016. Brookings Institution.
- "What We're Fighting For". New York Times. February 10, 2017.
- "Tales of War and Redemption". The American Scholar. December 4, 2017.
- "Two Decades of War Have Eroded the Morale of America's Troops". The Atlantic. April 13, 2018.
- "The Warrior at the Mall". New York Times. April 14, 2018.
- "The Lesson of Eric Greitens, and the Navy SEALs Who Tried to Warn Us". The New Yorker. May 17, 2018.
- "Public Rage Won't Solve Any of Our Problems". Time. October 25, 2018.
- "Deployment to Iraq changed my view of God, country and humankind. So did coming home". America. November 11, 2018.
- "Trump, Hegseth and the Honor of the American Military". New York Times. January 2, 2025.
- "What Trump Is Really Doing With His Boat Strikes". New York Times. December 5, 2025.
