= Ian McDonald (British author) =

British science fiction novelist

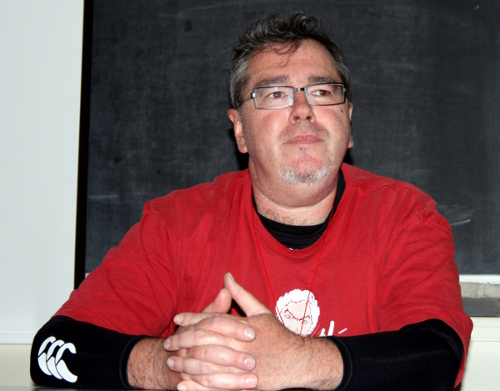
- Ian McDonald at SFeraKon 2010 in Zagreb
- Born: 1960 (age 65–66); Manchester, England
- Occupation: Novelist
- Writing career
- Genre: Science fiction

Ian McDonald (born 1960) is a British science fiction novelist, living in Belfast. His themes include nanotechnology, postcyberpunk settings, and the impact of rapid social and technological change on non-Western societies.

== Early life ==
Ian McDonald was born in 1960, in Manchester, to a Scottish father and Irish mother. He moved to Belfast when he was five and has lived there ever since. He lived through the whole of the Troubles (1968–1999), and his sensibility has been permanently shaped by coming to understand Northern Ireland as a postcolonial society imposed on an older culture.

== Career ==
McDonald sold his first story to a local Belfast magazine when he was 22, and in 1987 became a full-time writer. He has also worked in TV consultancy within Northern Ireland, contributing scripts to the Northern Irish Sesame Workshop production of Sesame Tree.

McDonald's debut novel was Desolation Road (1988), which takes place on a far future Mars in a town that develops around an oasis in the terraformed Martian desert. He published a sequel, Ares Express, in 2001.

Published between 1995 and 2000, the novels Chaga (US title Evolution's Shore) and Kirinya, with the novella Tendeléo's Story, form the 'Chaga Saga', which chronicles the effects of an alien flora introduced to Earth, and also analyses the AIDS crisis in Africa. The protagonist is Ulster journalist Gaby McAslin, whose outsider's eye both observes the African landscape and sees what the "UN quarantine zone" is doing to Kenya and Kenyans. Gaby's story, with that of her daughter, continues in Kirinya. Tendeléo's Story is seen through the eyes of a young Kenyan girl who escapes to the UK, only to be deported back to Kenya as an unwanted alien.

The image of the unstoppable wave of transformation was nicked from [1982 Star Trek movie] The Wrath of Khan: it's the Genesis device, slowed down, and once I had that, it became a rich source of metaphors: for colonialism, new technology, globalisation, change, death. If the Chaga is colonialism, it's a unique kind that allows the people of the poor South to use and transform it to meet their needs and empower themselves: it's a symbiosis.

McDonald's River of Gods (2004) is set in mid-21st-century India; it won the BSFA Award, and was nominated for a Hugo Award and a Arthur C. Clarke Award. Brasyl (2007) is set in the 18th and 21st centuries in Lusophone South America; it won the BSFA award, and was nominated for a Hugo Award and the Warwick Prize for Writing. McDonald began his Everness series of young adult fiction novels in 2011 with Planesrunner. He said in a 2014 interview, "I didn't want to get stuck doing the same SF books over and over, successful though they may be. I didn't want to keep writing books about the developing economy of the year—India, Brazil. I could feel myself getting trapped in that." He has written two Everness sequels, Be My Enemy (2012), and Empress of the Sun (2014).

McDonald published Luna: New Moon, the first volume of a proposed science fiction duology, in 2015. It explores the dangerous intrigue that surrounds the five powerful families who control industry on the Moon. McDonald said of the novel in August 2014, "I’m still writing about developing economies, it’s just that this one happens to be on the Moon." Before critics called the novel "Game of Thrones in space", McDonald himself dubbed it "Game of Domes" and "Dallas in space". Luna was optioned for development as a television series before its release. The sequel, Luna: Wolf Moon, was released in March 2017. A third novel, Luna: Moon Rising, was released in March 2019. McDonald previously published the novelette "The Fifth Dragon", a prequel to Luna in the same setting, in the 2014 anthology Reach for Infinity.

McDonald's Time Was, a time travel romance novella about two men, was released in April 2018.

== Awards ==
=== Won ===
- Locus Award – First Novel (1989): Desolation Road
- Philip K. Dick Award – Best Collection (1991): King of Morning, Queen of Day
- BSFA Award – Best Short Fiction (1992): Innocents
- Kurd Laßwitz Award (1999): Sacrifice of Fools
- Theodore Sturgeon Award (2001): Tendeléo's Story
- BSFA Award – Best Novel (2004): River of Gods
- Hugo Award for Best Novelette (2007): The Djinn's Wife
- BSFA Award – Best Novel (2007): Brasyl
- John W. Campbell Memorial Award (2011): The Dervish House
- BSFA Award – Best Novel (2011): The Dervish House
- Gaylactic Spectrum Award – Best Novel (2016): Luna: New Moon

=== Nominations ===
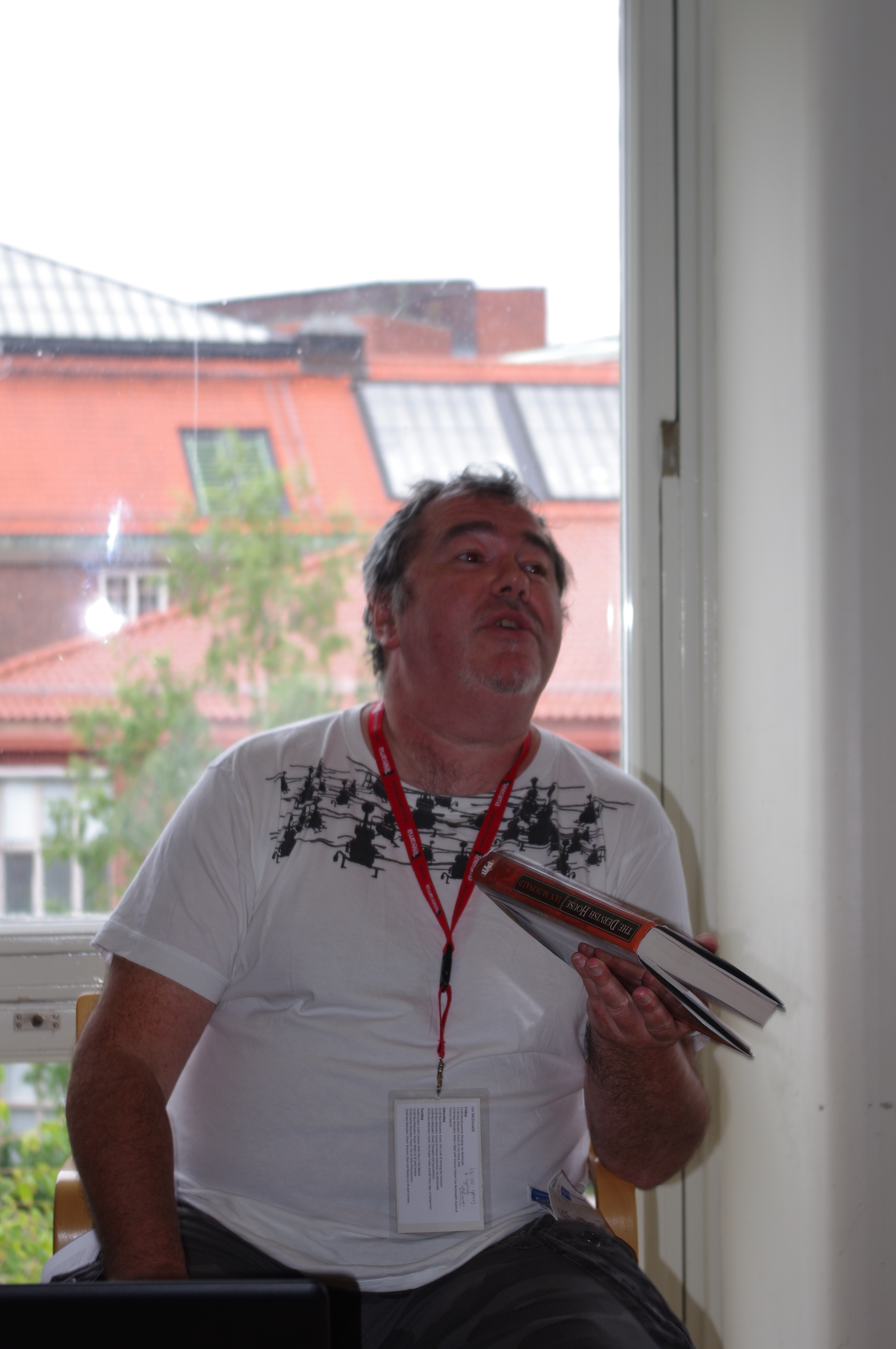
Ian McDonald at Eurocon/Swecon 2011 in Stockholm

- Nebula Award for Best Novelette (1989): Unfinished Portrait of the King of Pain by Van Gogh
- Arthur C. Clarke Award (1990): Desolation Road
- Locus Award for Best Fantasy Novel (1992): King of Morning, Queen of Day
- Arthur C. Clarke Award (1993): Hearts, Hands, and Voices
- BSFA Award for Best Novel (1992): Hearts, Hands, and Voices
- World Fantasy Award—Short Fiction (1994): Some Strange Desire
- Philip K. Dick Award (1994): Scissors Cut Paper Wrap Stone
- BSFA Award for Best Novel (1994): Necroville
- BSFA Award for Best Novel (1995): Chaga
- John W. Campbell Memorial Award (1996): Chaga
- Arthur C. Clarke Award (2005): River of Gods
- Hugo Award for Best Novel (2005): River of Gods
- Hugo Award for Best Novel (2008): Brasyl
- Warwick Prize for Writing (2008/9) and reached prize longlist announced in November 2008: Brasyl
- John W. Campbell Memorial Award (2008): Brasyl
- Locus Award for Best Science Fiction Novel (2008): Brasyl
- Nebula Award for Best Novel (2008): Brasyl
- Hugo Award for Best Novel (2011): The Dervish House
- Locus Award for Best Science Fiction Novel (2011): The Dervish House
- Arthur C. Clarke Award (2011): The Dervish House
- BSFA Award for Best Novel (2015): Luna: New Moon
- Philip K. Dick Award (2018): Time Was
- Locus Award for Best Science Fiction Novel (2018): Luna: Wolf Moon
- Locus Award for Best Science Fiction Novel (2020): Luna: Moon Rising

== Selected bibliography ==
=== Desolation Road series ===
- Desolation Road (1988)
- Ares Express (2001)

=== Chaga saga ===
- Chaga (1995, US: Evolution's Shore)
- Kirinya (1997)

=== India in 2047 ===
- River of Gods (2004)
- Cyberabad Days (2009) (collection)

=== Everness series ===
- Planesrunner (2011)
- Be My Enemy (2012)
- Empress of the Sun (2014)

=== Luna series ===
- Luna: New Moon (2015)
- Luna: Wolf Moon (2017)
- Luna: Moon Rising (2019)
- The Menace from Farside (novella) (2019)

=== Other novels ===
- Out on Blue Six (1989)
- King of Morning, Queen of Day (1991)
- Hearts, Hands and Voices (1992, US: The Broken Land)
- Necroville (1994, US: Terminal Café)
- Sacrifice of Fools (1996)
- Brasyl (2007)
- The Dervish House (2010)
- Time Was (2018)
- Hopeland (2023)
- The Wilding (2024)
- Boy, with Accidental Dinosaur (2026)

== See also ==
- List of science-fiction authors
- List of English writers (K–Q)

== External resources ==
- Official blog
- Ian McDonald at the Internet Speculative Fiction Database
- Ian McDonald at Fantastic Fiction
- "Interview". at The Agony Column
- "Interview". at Cyberpunks
- "Interview". at Locus (excerpts)
- "The Coode Street Episode 72: Live with Gary K. Wolfe and Ian McDonald". Archived from the original on 22 March 2023.
