= Chaga (McDonald novel) =

1995 novel by Ian McDonald

- First edition cover
- Author: Ian McDonald
- Audio read by: Melanie McHugh
- Language: English
- Genre: Science fiction
- Publisher: Gollancz (UK); Bantam Spectra (US)
- Publication date: 12 October 1995 (UK); 1 December 1995 (US)
- Publication place: United Kingdom
- Media type: Print, E-book, Audiobook
- Pages: 416
- ISBN: 978-0-57506-052-4 (UK); 0-553-37435-4 (US)
- Preceded by: "Toward Kilimanjaro"
- Followed by: Kirinya

Chaga (published as Evolution's Shore in the United States) is a 1995 science fiction novel by British author Ian McDonald. It was released in the United Kingdom on 12 October 1995. Told through the eyes of journalist Gaby McAslan, the novel explores the catastrophic effects of an alien flora, dubbed the "Chaga", which is brought to Kenya by a meteor in what has become known as the Kilimanjaro Event.

McDonald said of the novel:

The image of the unstoppable wave of transformation was nicked from The Wrath of Khan: it's the Genesis device, slowed down, and once I had that, it became a rich source of metaphors: for colonialism, new technology, globalisation, change, death. If the Chaga is colonialism, it's a unique kind that allows the people of the poor South to use and transform it to meet their needs and empower themselves: it's a symbiosis.

Chaga was nominated for the British Science Fiction Association Award for Best Novel (1995), and the John W. Campbell Memorial Award for Best Science Fiction Novel (1996).
