= Planesrunner =

2011 novel by Ian McDonald

- Author: Ian McDonald
- Language: English
- Series: Everness
- Genre: Science fiction; Young adult fiction
- Publisher: Pyr
- Publication date: 20 December 2011
- Publication place: United States; United Kingdom
- Media type: Print; E-book; Audiobook
- Pages: 269
- ISBN: 978-1-616-14541-5
- Followed by: Be My Enemy; Empress of the Sun

Planesrunner is a 2011 young adult science fiction novel by British author Ian McDonald, and the first installment of the Everness series. The book follows British teenager Everett Singh as he travels between alternate universes in search of his missing theoretical physicist father.

== Plot ==
British teenager Everett Singh witnesses the kidnapping of his father, theoretical physicist Dr. Tejendra Singh, and begins to suspect a conspiracy when he receives from his father an automated software download called the Infundibulum. Tejendra's colleague, the offbeat research fellow Colette Harte, gives Everett video evidence that Tejendra's theoretical research into the existence of multiple universes is no longer theoretical. Using Heisenberg Gate technology, Tejendra and his team have discovered and contacted nine alternate universes so far. An alliance called the Plenitude of Known Worlds is already in place among the government leaders from these parallel universes—termed planes—which have been numbered E1 through E9, with Everett's plane labeled E10. Before Tejendra's disappearance, he discovered a map of the seemingly infinite number of planes: the Infundibulum. Everett deduces how to manipulate the Infundibulum thanks to a clue from his father, and lets its existence be known to the mysterious people who have been pursuing him in search of it. He is taken by the glamorous but sinister Charlotte Villiers—the Plenipotentiary/ambassador of E3—to the underground bunker where his universe's Heisenberg Gate is located. During a demonstration of his ability to choose any destination in any plane, Everett escapes through the Gate to E3, where Charlotte has put Tejendra to work on the Gate technology.

E3 is an Earth without oil, where giant airships dominate shipping and transportation. Plastic does not exist, but E3 has developed nanotechnology that allows the use of carbon fiber in many applications. Everett meets and is taken in by Sen, the willful adopted daughter of Captain Anastasia Sixsmyth of the airship Everness. Sen is the ship's pilot, Mchynlyth is the engineer, and Miles O'Rahilly Lafayette Sharkey is the weighmaster. Hired as Sixsmyth's chef, Everett enlists Sen to infiltrate Charlotte's headquarters, the Tyrone Tower, to determine where Tejendra is being held. This leads Charlotte—brandishing a jumpgun, a weapon capable of shooting people into a random other plane—to Hackney Great Port, where the Everness is moored. She and her team are rebuffed by a mob, and the Everness leaves for the Goodwin Sands, where Sixsmyth has been challenged to an airship duel by one of her enemies, the arrogant matriarch Ma Bromley. Everett helps sabotage Bromley's airship, and a thankful Sixsmyth agrees to help him save his father. The Everness crew break into the Tyrone Tower on zip-lines and the Singhs are reunited, but Charlotte arrives with her jumpgun and demands the Infundibulum. Everett places his laptop in front of her, and she decides to be rid of the Singhs forever. Charlotte jumps Tejendra to an unknown plane, but Sen intervenes before Charlotte can do the same to Everett. He grabs his computer and Charlotte's jumpgun, and escapes to the Everness with the crew. They are soon intercepted by Charlotte, who has commandeered a Royal Air Navy carrier. Everett uses the jumpgun to jump the entirety of the Everness to another plane, and they find themselves in a frozen tundra, with ice and snow as far as the eye can see.

== Development ==
McDonald has classified the Everness series as "steampunk without steam. Teslapunk. Steampunk without the messed-around Victorian values." He said, "I came up with the image of an airship that can travel between parallel universes, which is probably something every writer's thought of at some point, and I just followed it through." Of the move to young adult fiction, McDonald noted, "It was a nice break to do something different ... I didn't want to get stuck doing the same SF books over and over, successful though they may be. I didn't want to keep writing books about the developing economy of the year—India, Brazil. I could feel myself getting trapped in that ... The kids' book series gives me a chance to play off the leash a bit." Adding that he has been approached about adapting Planesrunner for television, McDonald said that the series "is aimed at the Doctor Who audience quite deliberately. The series has the go-anywhere machine, which is what the Tardis is, but I also wanted a crew like you have in Star Trek."

== Reception ==
Though deeming lead character Everett Singh "too perfect", Publishers Weekly praised the novel's "nonstop action, eccentric characters, and expert universe building". Writing for The Telegraph, Anna Lisinski praised the detail with which McDonald describes E3, including the theme that prejudice is an ever-present potentiality in any culture, no matter its development. However, she found it difficult to empathise with Everett, and called the other characters underdeveloped. Susan Carpenter of the Los Angeles Times wrote that Planesrunner is "not just for kids", calling it thought-provoking and "a visually, if densely, written tale of sci-fi suspense that ponders big questions with wonderment and heart." Stefan Raets of Tor.com agreed that the novel has "a lot to offer" non-young adult readers, complimenting the engaging characters and calling the setting of E3 "so insanely cool that it just about blows any other steampunk London clean out of the water." He added, "Planesrunner is one of those novels that grabs hold of you from the very beginning and then just never lets go until the very end." Kirkus Reviews praised the novel's "shining imagination, pulsing suspense and sparkling writing", and multiple reviews noted McDonald's successful simplification of the theory of quantum mechanics, which makes the concept easy to understand.

== Sequels ==
A sequel, Be My Enemy, was released on 4 September 2012, followed by Empress of the Sun on 4 February 2014.

=== Be My Enemy ===
While the Everness crew assess their location and the condition of the airship, Everett tries to figure out how to interface the Infundibulum with Charlotte's jumpgun so he can choose the destination planes of future jumps. Something large appears on the radar, headed their way: a massive hovercraft battleship, with insignia that identifies the Islamic Britain of E2. It is swallowed by a giant creature that breaks through the ice just as the Everness jumps to Everett's home plane, E10. Meanwhile, an alternate Everett in E4—whose father Tejendra was previously hit by a truck on his bicycle and killed—is hit by a car himself. He awakens in a station on the Moon, where an alien machine intelligence known as the Thryn arrived in 1963. Kept secret from the majority of people on Earth for 20 years, the Thryn Sentiency helped mankind achieve important medical and technological advancements, including the creation of the Heisenberg Gate. Plenipotentiary Charles Villiers—Charlotte's E4 counterpart—asks E4 Everett to become an agent for the Plenitude. The Thryn avatar Madam Moon rebuilds Everett's wrecked body with technology that provides enhanced strength, speed, and agility; heightened senses; and built-in weaponry. He goes to E10 Everett's home, impersonates him, and attacks when E10 Everett arrives to rescue his mother and sister.

The Everness escapes to the quarantined plane E1, where E10 Everett believes the jumpgun was created. He hopes to learn how to track past jumps in order to find his father. E1 has been overrun by a nanotechnology breakthrough gone awry, known as the Nahn, which has already assimilated six billion people and seeks to supplant every living thing on the planet. Sixsmyth and the crew are taken into custody by the government force protecting the few survivors in London, led by a politician called the Agister of Caiaophas and her military commander, the Brigadier. They hope to escape E1 with their people using the jumpgun and the Infundibulum. E10 Everett meets the E1 Tejendra, who guides a strike team to the Nahn-infested remains of Imperial University in search of a device used in a 1969 E1 survey to map thousands of planes. Tejendra is assimilated during their frantic escape back to the Everness with the device, and Everett opens a Heisenberg Gate tuned to the center of a sun that incinerates the whole of the university and the Nahn. Seeing the power of Everett's "sun gun", the Agister decides to stay and use it to rid E1 of the Nahn. The Everness crew depart, with the Panopticon mapping device, to find Everett's father, the E10 Tejendra. Meanwhile, the Villiers send E4 Everett to E1 in Thryn battle armor to attach a tracking device to the Everness. Though outfitted with weaponry designed to neutralize the Nahn, he is overcome by them. E4 Everett makes a deal: in exchange for his life, he agrees to carry some of the Nahn out of E1. Successfully attaching the tracker, he is jumped out by the Villiers, who place him back with E10 Everett's mother and are unaware that he carries a node of the Nahn.

Kirkus Reviews called Be My Enemy "smart, clever and abundantly original, with suspense that grabs your eyeballs". Stefan Raets of Tor.com called the novel "outstanding" and "a blast from start to finish", but found some plot points lacking.

=== Empress of the Sun ===
The Everness is forced to make a random jump, and the airship is seriously damaged by its arrival in the middle of a jungle. Everett soon realizes that this "Earth" is actually an Alderson disk, so his navigation calculations were off. Determining that humans could not be advanced enough to construct the disk, he theorizes that dinosaurs who have evolved over 65 million of years might be capable. This is proven true when just such a dinosaur, Kaz, approaches Everett and is able to learn the English language almost instantly with advanced technology. The Worldwheel is ruled by six factions, or clades, each responsible for a key function: water, weather, agriculture, procreation, defense, and the sun itself. With Everett's help, Kaz defeats her rival and secures her position as heir to the Sun Throne of the Sunlords. Meanwhile, Charlotte Villiers is still hunting the Everness and the Infundibulum. She leads a strike squad into the airship expecting to face only the crew, but the Genequeen clade of Jiju attack the Everness as well, forcing Charlotte to flee and leave her team to be massacred.

E4 Everett begins to settle into the life of his E10 counterpart after destroying the Nahn he brought with him from E1. Though he hides his Thryn abilities as best he can, some of the changes do not go unnoticed, giving Everett a bevy of female admirers and ultimately forcing him to admit to E10 Everett's best friend Ryun that he is E4 Everett. On the Worldwheel, Kaz brings E10 Everett and Sharkey to the Sunlord capital to meet her mother, the Empress of the Sun. After copying the Infundibulum, the Empress uses it to begin an invasion of billions of planes in the extended multiverse, and prompts the Worldwheel's sun to go nova, sanitizing the world and exterminating all of the other clades. The Everness escapes just in time. E10 Everett has a plan: since the Empress copied the Infundibulum exactly, Everett can control it with his smartphone. With Kaz's help, the airship crew infiltrates the Empress's city-ship over E10 London, and Everett sends a signal that jumps all of the Jiju ships into random planes, and then erases all copies of the Infundibulum. Charlotte returns to her true home plane, which she has dubbed E3A. She longs to be reunited with her lover Langdon, who is trapped in the rift between planes after going through an early iteration of the Heisenberg Gate.

Kirkus Reviews described Empress of the Sun as "endlessly fascinating and fun." Stefan Raets of Tor.com deemed it the best novel in the series so far, and praised its dynamic characters.
