= Time Was (novella) =

Science fiction novella by Ian McDonald

- Author: Ian McDonald
- Language: English
- Genre: Time travel; Historical fiction; Gay literature; Romance
- Publisher: Tor Books
- Publication date: 24 April 2018
- Publication place: United Kingdom; United States
- Media type: Print (paperback); E-book
- Pages: 144
- ISBN: 978-0-765-39146-9

Time Was is a time travel romance novella by British author Ian McDonald, published on 24 April 2018 by Tor Books.

== Plot ==
London book dealer Emmett Leigh discovers a love letter, written from Tom to Ben, in a World War II-era book of poetry, Time Was by E.L. After selling the book and posting the letter to online war history groups, Emmett is contacted by Thorn Hildreth, who produces a 1941 diary entry from her great-grandfather, Rev Anson Hildreth, which mentions close friends Tom and Ben at the Heliopolis Club in Alexandria, and is accompanied by photos of the men. Emmett's friend Shahrzad Hejazi at the Imperial War Museum in London recalls and finds a photo of Tom and Ben taken in July 1915, as well as an eyewitness account of them, identified by name, disappearing together into an otherworldly portal. Shahrzad also retrieves a photo of them from a documentary shot in Bosnia in 1995, in which they seem only a decade or so older than the one taken in 1915. Emmett and Thorn hypothesize that Tom and Ben are "emortal"—they age slowly, but are not immortal, in that they can die. Emmett and Thorn—now lovers themselves—travel to Paris to retrieve the copy of Time Was Emmett sold. They learn that the old bookstores which possess copies of the book have generations-old instructions to never sell them, and to pass them along to other bookshops should theirs close. In addition to the one sold by Emmett, the Paris bookstore has their own copy, in which Emmett and Thorn find a letter from Ben to Tom, written in Nanking in 1937. They realize that the men are time travelers, and use the books to communicate. Emmett determines that all known copies of Time Was are held by five bookshops across the world, in Paris, Lisbon, New York, Brussels, and Rome. With further research online and at museums, he discovers multiple traces of Tom and Ben throughout the 19th and 20th century, the earliest of which is in 1856. His obsession with the project has a negative impact on his health. Applying quantum mechanics to the fact that the highest incidence of traces of the men is between 1935 and 1949, Emmett deduces that they are time travelers from the past, not the future. Watching the documentary, Thorn's grandfather, Leland, is able to identify Tom's accent as coming from Woodbridge, Suffolk. This leads Emmett to a purported 1980 UFO sighting at RAF Woodbridge, and a 1940s incident at a hamlet named Shingle Street, which Emmett guesses is Tom and Ben's departure point.

In the early 1940s, Royal Engineer Tom Chappell and Royal Air Force scientist Ben Seligman, a new arrival to RAF Bawdsey, lock eyes at a pub. They are soon romantically involved, in secret. A test of Ben's secret military project, seeking cloaking technology, appears successful, which leads to a larger attempt. This experiment creates a time vortex into which Tom and Ben are drawn.

In the present, Regenbald Howe, the caretaker of the Martello tower at Shingle Street, knows of Chappell and Seligman, who were stationed at RAF Bawdsey during World War II. He produces a diary, left anonymously for the Chappell family in 1980, in which Tom describes a military scientific experiment gone awry. Regenbald has also amassed countless eyewitness accounts, personal notes, and legends about the event. Over the next few years, the Paris and Brussels bookstores close, but Emmett keeps track of their copies of Time Was, both in Rome. He reads of a strange storm in Cyprus, which he believes to be one of Tom and Ben's portals. Tom arrives at one of the bookshops, and recognizes a stunned Emmett as the E.L. who wrote Time Was. Sometime in the near future, Emmett will become a time traveler himself, and meet a young Tom before the experiment. Emmett tells Tom that Ben died in a ship sunk by torpedoes.

== Characters ==
=== 1940s ===
- Tom Chappell, a member of the Royal Engineers, in the 9th Heavy Anti-Aircraft Regiment, Royal Artillery, stationed at RAF Bawdsey
- Ben Seligman, a doctor of physics with Royal Air Force Photoreconnaissance
- Rev Anson Hildreth, padre with the Royal Army Chaplains' Department, assigned to the 9th

=== Present day ===
- Emmett Leigh, an English book dealer
- Thorn Hildreth, a jack of all trades who maintains her family archives
- Leland Hildreth, Thorn's aged grandfather
- Shahrzad Hejazi, a Persian photo archivist at the Imperial War Museum in London
- Regenbald Howe, the caretaker of the Martello tower at Shingle Street

== Themes ==
Time Was touches on a necessarily secret homosexual romance in the World War II-era, with Booklist adding that it "captures the emotional nuances of a decades-long love while exploring issues of military and scientific might and the state of the contemporary book industry."

== Publication ==
In April 2016, the novella was announced as Time There Was, to be released in 2017. By October 2017, the title had changed to Time Was, with an April 2018 publication date. It was released on 24 April 2018.

== Reception ==
In Library Journal, Kristi Chadwick called the story "elegant and delightedly romantic", and praised its "exciting, timeless finish." Booklist wrote that "This tiny novel packs a huge emotional punch as layers upon layers are revealed." Publishers Weekly called the novella compelling and vivid, noting that "The ending's predictability is washed away by beautiful writing that mixes Emmett's excitement with melancholy". Writing for Locus, Gary K. Wolfe called Time Was "one of the most purely beautiful pieces" of McDonald's writing, and praised the device of communicating through bookstores as "both ingenious and romantic in its own way".

In January 2019, Time Was was nominated for a Philip K. Dick Award.
