= Luna: Wolf Moon =

2017 science fiction novel by Ian McDonald

- First edition cover
- Author: Ian McDonald
- Audio read by: Thom Rivera
- Cover artist: Victor Mosquera
- Language: English
- Genre: Science fiction
- Publisher: Gollancz (UK)/Paperback; Tor (US)/Hardcover
- Publication date: 23 March 2017 (UK); 28 March 2017 (US)
- Publication place: United Kingdom; United States
- Media type: Print; E-book; Audiobook
- Pages: 416
- ISBN: 978-1-47320-226-9 (UK); 978-0-76537-553-7 (US)
- Preceded by: Luna: New Moon
- Followed by: Luna: Moon Rising

Luna: Wolf Moon is a 2017 science fiction novel by British author Ian McDonald. It is the second book in a three-part series that also includes Luna: New Moon and Luna: Moon Rising.

The novel explores the aftermath of the Corta family's destruction at the hands of their enemies on the Moon as the survivors seek salvation and revenge. The novel was released in the UK on 23 March 2017, and in the US on 28 March 2017.

== Setting ==
In the future, a near feudal colony has risen up around the industrialisation of the Moon, and though technology keeps the deadly natural environment at bay, the four basic essentials of life—air, water, carbon and data—come at a price. Tiny "chibs" placed in the eye to meter usage of these Four Elementals serve as a constant reminder of this. Everyone also has a "familiar": a personalized, holographic avatar that hovers over one shoulder and serves as an interface with the Moon's network, other familiars, and even one's physical surroundings. There is only contract law and no criminal law, and everything from marriage to divorce to murder is infinitely negotiable; the culture of the Moon's elite features polysexual and polyamorous relationships accented with cocktails, designer drugs, and 3D printed vintage couture. Under contracts granted by the Lunar Development Corporation (LDC), the Moon has been controlled by five families: the Australian Mackenzies dominate mineral extraction, the Asamoahs of Ghana control a vast underground agricultural industry, the Russian Vorontsovs run the transportation systems, the Suns of China are masters of technology, and the upstart Brazilian Cortas mine helium-3 to power Earth's fusion reactors. In Luna: New Moon, the Suns manipulate the Mackenzies and the Cortas to reignite their long-simmering rivalry; the Corta empire is destroyed, and its members killed or scattered.

== Plot ==
Recovering from his near-fatal Moon-run escape through vacuum, Lucas Corta has only one source of potential allies to reclaim his empire: Earth. But as those who have lived on the Moon for an extended period are physically incapable of surviving on Earth, he enlists Dr. Galina Volikova to help him overcome this obstacle on the Vorontsov orbiting cycler Saints Peter and Paul. Months later he makes the journey, knowing a stay longer than four months will kill him. While making connections on Earth, Lucas meets his cousin Alexia Corta, and enlists her as an ally in his plan to reclaim the Corta empire.

Eighteen months after the destruction of the Cortas, the triumphant Mackenzie family gathers for the 105th birthday celebration of patriarch Robert on their smelting train Crucible, which perpetually follows the Sun. The facility's mirror array suddenly turns on itself, and though key members of the family and their guests escape, almost two hundred of the partygoers are incinerated as the compound is destroyed within minutes. Robert himself is left to die by his wife Jade Sun, whom he manages to kill before he perishes. Surviving the catastrophe, the Sun matriarch Cixi takes Jade and Robert's son Darius Mackenzie under her protection. Robert's son Bryce Mackenzie learns that Crucible's destruction was caused by a Trojan horse planted decades before, and connects it to the Cortas. Robson Corta, the orphaned son of Rachel Mackenzie and Rafa Corta who has been living as a veritable Mackenzie hostage, flees Bryce's revenge and joins his uncle, Wagner Corta, in hiding.

In the wake of Robert's death, Bryce seizes control of the Mackenzie helium-3 operations at João de Deus, formerly Corta property, and establishes Mackenzie Helium. His elder brother Duncan solidifies his hold on Mackenzie Metals and reopens the only remaining smelter on the Moon, the original Mackenzie facility at Hadley. Bryce's blades decimate one of Duncan's work crews, nearly killing Duncan's son Denny. Citing Corta honor, Wagner rescues Denny even though he murdered Wagner's brother Carlinhos. As payback, Denny agrees to protect Robson while Wagner is away. Bryce's knives come for Robson, and though Denny and his people intervene, Robson flees.

Paralyzed from the waist down, Ariel Corta is in hiding but performs legal work remotely. Her bodyguard Marina Calzaghe's "Moonday"—when she must decide whether to return to Earth before the Moon's changes to her body are irreversible, or stay on the Moon permanently—is approaching. With the LDC board turning against him, Jonathan Kayode hires Ariel as his legal advisor, knowing that her current lack of family and business alliances makes her the only person he can trust. Without warning Ariel, Jonathan seizes control of the LDC and arrests its board members. Ariel meets with Lady Sun, Lousika Asamoah, and Duncan Mackenzie to confirm whether they will position their families with or against Jonathan. She seeks out banker Vidhya Rao, whom she believes can give her insight into the Vorontsovs, who have gone quiet. Ariel is shocked to learn that the Vorontsovs have begun a brutal coup of their own.

Wagner and his team of surface workers encounter an Asamoah farming facility seemingly crippled by malfunctioning Vorontsov moon-dozers, who are now heading in the direction of the Asamoah city of Twé. The inhabitants of the facility have been assassinated by robots who now pursue Wagner's rover; he loses two teammates, but the survivors rendezvous with a rescue team. With his father Lucas missing and presumed dead, Lucasinho Corta is living under the protection of the Asamoahs in Twé. An attack disables the city's fusion reactor and the dozers begin covering the domes of Twé with surface regolith to render its solar panels useless. Lucasinho flees the city with his nine-year-old cousin Luna, daughter of Rafa and Lousika, but their transport pod is stranded at a remote relay station due to a lack of power. Lucasinho finds a rover, and their journey toward João de Deus is fraught with danger. Running out of energy and air, Luna and an unconscious Lucasinho find refuge in the destroyed subterranean Corta mansion, Boa Vista.

Aided by the Vorontsovs, the Lunar Mandate Authority of Earth has seized control of the Moon. In Meridian, Jonathan is assassinated, and Marina returns to Earth. Ariel is summoned by the mastermind behind the brutal takeover: her brother Lucas. Duncan seeks Robson as leverage against Lucas, but Denny lets the boy flee with Wagner, and is exiled by Duncan. Lucas reclaims Boa Vista.

== Characters ==
- Lucas Corta, former Managing Director of the Corta Hélio corporation and the Corta family's eldest surviving member
- Lucasinho Corta, Lucas' son and heir
- Wagner Corta, Lucas' youngest and only surviving brother
- Ariel Corta, Lucas' sister, a lawyer in the Court of Clavius
- Robson Corta, Rafa Corta's young son by Rachel Mackenzie
- Robert Mackenzie, centenarian Mackenzie patriarch and founder of Mackenzie Metals
- Duncan Mackenzie, son of Robert and Alyssa, father to Rachel and Denny, and CEO of Mackenzie Metals
- Adrian Mackenzie, eldest son of Duncan Mackenzie and Apollonaire Vorontsov, husband to Jonathan Kayode
- Denny Mackenzie, son of Duncan and Apollonaire
- Bryce Mackenzie, Robert's son and Head of Finance of Mackenzie Metals
- Jade Sun, Robert's second wife, elder sister of Amanda Sun
- Darius Mackenzie, son of Robert and Jade
- Jonathan Kayode, Eagle of the Moon, president of the Lunar Development Corporation, husband to Adrian Mackenzie
- Cixi, Lady Sun, the Dowager of Taiyang, matriarch of the Sun family
- Lousika Asamoah, Rafa Corta's second wife
- Luna Corta, Lousika's young daughter by Rafa
- Marina Calzaghe, Ariel's bodyguard
- Vidhya Rao, a gender-neutral economist, consultant to Whitacre Goddard bank and member of the Lunarian Society and the Pavilion of the White Hare
- Hoang Lam Hung, Bryce's adopted son, and Robson's guardian
- Abena Asamoah, Lucasinho's lover
- Kojo Asamoah, one of Lucasinho's former male lovers, and Abena's brother
- Analiese Mackenzie, Wagner's lover
- Valery Vorontsov, patriarch of the Vorontsovs
- Grigori Vorontsov(a), one of Lucasinho's former lovers
- Dr. Galina Volikova, Lucas Corta's physician on Saints Peter and Paul
- Dr. Carolina Macaraeg, former personal physician to Adriano Corta

== Publication ==
Luna: Wolf Moon is the second volume of a planned trilogy, following 2015's Luna: New Moon. McDonald said of the novel on Twitter in January 2016, "volume goes to 11 on this one". An excerpt was released at Tor.com on 6 March 2017.

Wolf Moon was released in paperback by Gollancz in the UK on 23 March 2017, and in hardcover by Tor in the US on 28 March 2017. The cover art is by Victor Mosquera.

== Reception ==
Publishers Weekly called the novel "compelling", adding that "Each of McDonald's viewpoint characters is made human in fascinating and occasionally disturbing detail, and the solar system of the 22nd century is wonderfully delineated." Niall Alexander of Tor.com compares the remaining Cortas to the Starks of George R. R. Martin's A Song of Ice and Fire, and calls Wolf Moon "impossibly taut and profligate with plot". He wrote of the novel's pace and building tension, "It's relentless ... Ever so exhilarating, but also exhausting, at points. But it's not for nothing—for every plot point and every character arc there's either payoff or the promise of—and happily, there are ... moments of much-needed relief."

=== Awards and nominations ===
Luna: Wolf Moon was nominated for the 2018 Locus Award for Best Science Fiction Novel.
