= The Dervish House =

2010 science fiction novel by Ian McDonald

- First edition
- Author: Ian McDonald
- Cover artist: Stephan Martiniere
- Language: English
- Genre: Historical, Postmodern literature, Science fiction, Postcyberpunk
- Publisher: Pyr
- Publication date: July 27, 2010
- Publication place: Ireland
- Pages: 410
- ISBN: 1-61-614204-9

The Dervish House is a 2010 science fiction novel by British author Ian McDonald. The novel was shortlisted for the Arthur C. Clarke Award in 2011, and won the BSFA Award and the John W. Campbell Memorial Award in the same year. It was a nominee for the 2011 Hugo Award for Best Novel. The French translation La maison des derviches won the Planete-SF Blogger's Award in 2012.

== Plot ==
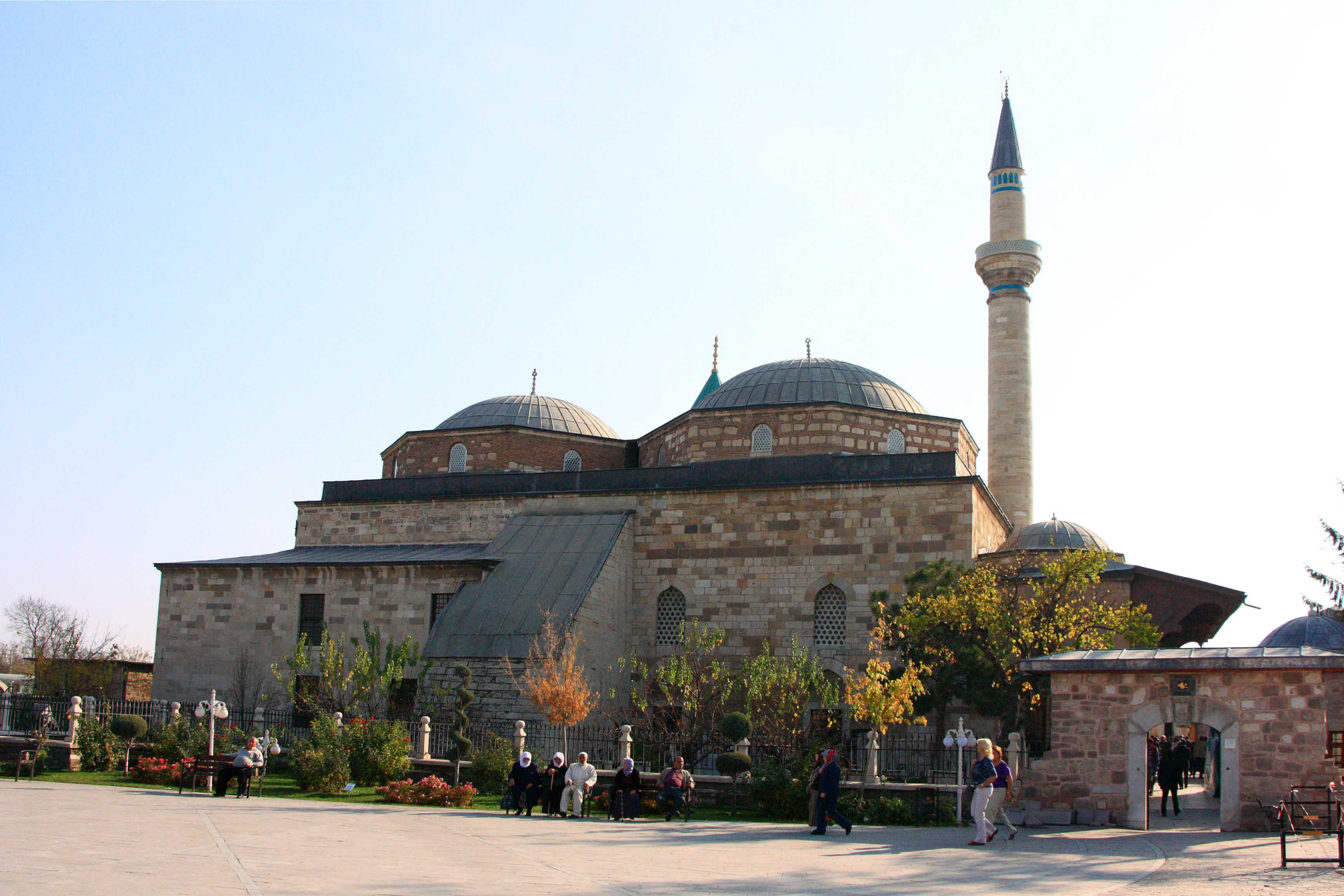
"We went to Rumi's tomb in Konya -- the Adem Dede dancehall, the one in which Ayse has the gallery, is based on the Konya dervish house"

The Dervish House is a near-future science fiction tale that follows a number of characters after a bus bombing incident in Istanbul during a week-long heatwave in April 2027. The characters have little contact with one another, other than they mostly reside or work in the neighborhood of an abandoned dervish house, Adem Dede, located in Eskiköy, within Istanbul's trendy Beyoğlu district. Most of the characters witness the bombing incident from different vantage points, and their actions are indirectly related to this event.

The chapters alternate character perspectives. The primary character threads concern the following characters:

- Necdet, an underachieving pothead who is on the bombed bus and subsequently sees djinn while experiencing a confusing religious awakening.
- Can Durukan, a homebound boy with Long QT syndrome who feels the vibrations of the distant blast. He sets his monkey-bot to investigate the scene and stumbles onto some dangerous clues.
- Georgios Ferentinou, member of the Greek minority and retired experimental economist. Georgios is mentor to young Can, and participates in an intellectual think tank tasked to anticipate future terrorist plots. He is also a member of a group of older Greek men who frequent the neighborhood tea house.
- Adnan Sarioğlu, a scheming big money trader who, along with his "Ultralord" buddies, devises a scam to sell tainted gas from Iran to his corrupt investors.
- Ayşe Erkoç, wife of Adnan, and atheist curator of an upscale religious artifact shop, which is located near the dervish house. A mysterious buyer entices Ayse to locate the legendary mellified man.
- Leyla Gültaşli, a recent marketing graduate whose big interview is thwarted by the aftermath of the bomb. A distant cousin offers her a position in his experimental nanotech company, the success of which is threatened by a contract set upon the lost half of a miniature Koran.

The story itself is a thriller, driven by the curious nature and mysterious motivations of the initial bombing, which resulted in no fatalities, other than the suicide bomber. Through the various character experiences it is revealed that the initial bombing was an experiment to test the effects of a hallucinogenic substance dispersed through a nanopowder vector on an unsuspecting population, in order to catalyze hallucinatory religious visions and usher in a cultural religious awakening. The story culminates when Necdet, Can, and Georgios thwart a final attempt by the terrorists to disperse the hallucinogen through the gas pipes of Istanbul.

== Themes ==
The novel combines old world aesthetics (religious art and cultural history) with high-tech innovations (nanotechnology, auto-piloted cars, robotics), while also addressing the contradictory nature of Istanbul's cultural identity at a time when Turkey has been admitted to the European Union. The effects of progress and technology on postmodern society are illustrated by the variety of disconnected neighborhood characters. The idea of religion as a shared delusion is also introduced through Necdet's unwitting hallucinogenic experience and his interactions with his neighborhood followers.
