= Desolation Road =

1988 science fiction novel by Ian McDonald

- First edition paperback cover
- Author: Ian McDonald
- Language: English
- Genre: Science fiction
- Publisher: Spectra
- Publication date: February 1988
- Publication place: United States
- Media type: Print (Paperback)
- Pages: 355
- ISBN: 978-0-553-27057-0
- Followed by: Ares Express

Desolation Road is a 1988 science fiction novel written by Ian McDonald. It was McDonald's first published novel. The plot takes place on a far future Mars in a town that develops around an oasis in the terraformed Martian desert. McDonald published a sequel, Ares Express, in 2001.

== Plot ==
In the future, scientist Dr. Alimantando is trekking across the desert of a terraformed Mars and meets a humanoid "greenperson", who claims to have traveled through time to make sure Alimantando is in the right place at the right time to fulfill his destiny. It comes in the form of a 700-year-old sentient ROTECH environmental engineering module, or orph, which lies dying in the desert. It bequeaths itself and its resources to Dr. Alimantando, who dismantles the machine and uses its components to build his oasis in the desert, which he names Desolation Road (instead of Destination Road) after consuming too much wine.

Over time, several people find themselves at this settlement in the middle of nowhere, and are welcomed by Dr. Alimantando. Crime lord Jameson Jericho, Pasternoster of the Exalted Families, flees the violent destruction of his empire by his enemies, pursued by assassins and possessing a chip in his brain containing the consciousnesses of his Exalted Ancestors. Would-be pioneers Rael and Eva Mandella, and Rael's father Haran, arrive ahead of a sandstorm, and Eva gives birth to twins Limaal and Taasmin. Rajandra Das, a man with the power to charm machinery, is unceremoniously kicked off a train at a random stop that turns out to be Desolation Road. Industrial chemist Mikal Margolis and his put-upon mother, "the Babooshka" accidentally disembark another train and are stranded. The beautiful pilot Persis Tatterdemalion crash lands her plane near the town and, unable to repair the aircraft, stays. She and Mikal begin a relationship and open the Bethlehem Ares Railroad/Hotel. Identical lothario triplets Ed, Louie, and Umberto Gallacelli arrive at the B.A.R./Hotel having fled their raucous past. A mechanic, a lawyer, and a farmer, respectively, all simultaneously fall in love with Persis at first sight. Mikal, meanwhile, has become infatuated with Marya Quinsana, a veterinarian, whose dentist brother Morton is himself both infatuated with and fiercely possessive of his sister. The feuding Stalin and Tenebrae families arrive, and are given homesteads right next to each other. Mr. and Mrs. Stalin's unpleasant son Johnny is both befriended and abused by the Mandella twins. Meredith Blue Mountain and his daughter Ruthie, whom he secretly created in a genesis-bottle, come to town to avoid persecution by their former neighbors. Ruthie has the power to absorb the beauty around her, and release it outward at will.

Haran Mandella marries the Babooshka, who despite her advanced age is desperate for another child. She commissions an artificial womb to carry their baby, but soon Genevieve Tenebrae, denied a child by her husband Gaston, steals the fetus and has Marya implant it in her. Nine months later, Genevieve gives birth to a daughter she names Arnie, while the artificial womb produces nothing; Hasan realizes what has occurred but cannot prove it. Rajandra Das speaks to a captive angel in a travelling show, and aids in its escape. Dominic Frontera, a representative from ROTECH's planetary maintenance division, arrives to inform the inhabitants of Desolation Road that their settlement will soon be destroyed thanks to an incoming ice comet. Part of the overall terraforming initiative and intended to add needed moisture into the atmosphere, the comet's trajectory was set with no knowledge of the town's existence, and cannot be stopped. Dr. Alimantando is desperate to complete his long-gestating formula for time travel to save the town, and the greenperson appears unexpectedly to provide the final calculations. Dr. Alimantando vanishes back in time to register Desolation Road as a town, effectively negating the threat of the comet, though the residents dream of the alternate timeline. Persis marries all three Gallacelli brothers, eventually having twins named Sevriano and Batisto.

== Reception ==
Cory Doctorow called Desolation Road "one of my most personally influential novels", describing it as "an epic tale of the terraforming of Mars, whose sweep captures the birth and death of mythologies, economics, art, revolution, politics." Doctorow also compared the novel to Kim Stanley Robinson's Mars trilogy (1992–1996), and noted that it pays homage to the David Byrne album The Catherine Wheel as well as the works of Ray Bradbury and Jack Vance. He wrote of Desolation Road, "Spanning centuries, the book includes transcendent math, alternate realities, corporate dystopias, travelling carnivals, post-singularity godlike AIs, geoengineering, and mechanical hobos, each integral to the plot."

== Sequel ==
McDonald published a sequel, Ares Express, in 2001.
