= River of Gods =

2004 novel by Ian McDonald

- First edition
- Author: Ian McDonald
- Cover artist: Darren Wall
- Language: English
- Genre: Science fiction
- Publisher: Simon & Schuster
- Publication date: 2004
- Publication place: United Kingdom
- Media type: Print (Hardback, Paperback)
- Pages: 485 (Paperback 1st edition), 583 (Hardcover 1st edition)
- ISBN: 0-7432-5670-0 (Paperback 1st edition), ISBN 0-7432-5669-7 (Hardcover 1st edition)
- OCLC: 56503983
- Dewey Decimal: 823.914 22
- LC Class: PR6063.C38 R58 2004

River of Gods is a 2004 science fiction novel by British writer Ian McDonald. It depicts a futuristic India in 2047, a century after its independence from Britain, characterized both by ancient traditions and advanced technologies such as artificial intelligences, robots and nanotechnology. The novel won the British Science Fiction Award in 2004 and was nominated for a Hugo. It was followed by a short story collection called Cyberabad Days in 2009.

== Plot introduction ==
The novel follows a number of different characters' viewpoints on and around the date of 15 August 2047, the centenary of India's partition and independence from the colonial British Raj. This future India has become balkanized into a number of smaller competing states, such as Awadh, Bharat, and Bangla. The global information network is now inhabited by artificial intelligences, phonetically called aeais in the novel, of varying levels of intelligence.

Aeais higher than level 2.5 (able to pass the Turing test and imitate humans) are banned, and their destruction ("excommunication") is the responsibility of "Krishna Cops", like Mr. Nandha. While some pockets of the subcontinent are still steeped in ancient tradition and values, mainstream culture is replete with aeais in TV entertainment and robotic swarms in defense. During such a time, Ranjit Ray steps down from his control of Ray Power, a key energy company, and the responsibility falls on his son Vishram Ray. The playboy Vishram is struggling to make it on his own as a stand-up comedian in Scotland when he is flown back to Varanasi to assume his role at Ray Power, for which he finds himself terribly ill-equipped but eventually surprisingly effective. He learns that his company is working on harvesting zero-point energy from other universes, and sees the particle collider built by his father with the help of Odeco, a clandestine investment firm.

After a prolonged drought, a severe water shortage threatens to jeopardize the peace between the subcontinental states. To avert this crisis, governments are melting glaciers and modifying natural systems. To take advantage of the unrest, a Hindu fundamentalist leader named N.K. Jeevanji organises a "rath yatra" on a spectacular juggernaut. He starts releasing key information to the press via Najia Askarzadah, an ambitious Swedish-Afghan reporter with a desire to be part of history as it is being made.

Lisa Durnau notices an apocalyptic crisis brewing in Alterre, a simulated evolution of earth created by AI scientist Thomas Lull, who is currently hiding in a South Indian coastal village. While Lisa is sent into space to investigate an asteroid, Thomas Lull runs into Aj, a girl with mysterious powers that allow her to see into people's lives, pasts and futures. He decides to follow her and protect her during her quest to find her own true identity, but it is soon revealed that Aj's powers extend beyond mere mortals, when she brings a robot army to a halt with the raise of a hand.

Tal is a beautiful nute (of neutral gender) involved in the designing team of India's greatest "soapi", Town & Country, some of the main stars of which are not human actors, but aeais. Tal falls prey to a conspiracy that compromises the career of Shaheen Badoor Khan, Private Secretary to the Prime Minister Sajida Rana, leading to her assassination and the fall of the government. All this leads to riots and popular fury against Muslims and transsexuals across Varanasi.

Lisa Durnau discovers that at the center of the mysterious asteroid is an 8-billion-year-old grey sphere, possibly a black hole remnant, or an alien artifact from another civilization. This "Tabernacle" communicates a message to the scientists, and this leads Lisa to India to find Thomas Lull, who alone can explain this phenomenon.

== Awards and nominations ==
- British Science Fiction Association Best Novel winner, 2004
- Arthur C. Clarke Award Best Novel nominee (2005)
- Hugo Awards, Best Novel nominee (2005)

== Release details ==
- January 2004: United Kingdom. Simon & Schuster. ISBN 0-7432-5670-0 (paperback).
- June 2004: United Kingdom. Simon & Schuster. ISBN 0-7432-5669-7 (hardcover).
- April 2005: United Kingdom. Simon & Schuster. ISBN 0-7434-0400-9 (paperback).
- March 2006: United States. Prometheus Books ISBN 1-59102-436-6 (hardcover).
