= Brasyl =

2007 novel by Ian McDonald

- First edition
- Author: Ian McDonald
- Cover artist: Stephan Martinière
- Language: English
- Genre: Science fiction, Cyberpunk
- Publisher: Pyr
- Publication date: May 3, 2007
- Publication place: United Kingdom
- Media type: Print (Hardcover)
- Pages: 357
- ISBN: 1-59102-543-5
- OCLC: 78790932
- Dewey Decimal: 823/.914 22
- LC Class: PR6063.C38 B73 2007

Brasyl is a 2007 novel by British author Ian McDonald. It was nominated for the 2008 Hugo Awards in the best novel category. In 2008 it was nominated for, and made the longlist of, the £50,000 Warwick Prize for Writing. It was also nominated for the Locus Award and John W. Campbell Memorial Award for Best Novel, and in 2009, it was nominated for the Nebula Award for Best Novel. It won the British Science Fiction Award for best novel in 2008.

== Plot summary ==
Brasyl is a story presented in three distinct strands of time. The main action concerns Marcelina Hoffman; a coked-up, ambitious reality TV producer in contemporary Brazil, a striving amateur capoeirista who transcends the cliches of luvvy television phony and becomes a full-fledged, truly likable person as we watch her embark upon a mad new project. Marcelina is going to find the disgraced goalie who lost Brazil a momentous World Cup half a century before and trick him into appearing on television for a mock trial in which the scarred nation can finally wreak its vengeance.

Another strand is set in mid-21st century São Paulo, at a moment when the first quantum technologies are reaching the street, which industriously finds its own use for these things. Q-blades that undo the information that binds together the universe, Q-cores that break the crypto that powers the surveillance state that knows every movement of every person and object in Sampa and beyond.

The final strand is an 18th-century Heart of Darkness adventure in the deep Amazon jungle, following an Irish-Portuguese Jesuit into slaver territory where he is sent to end the mad, bloody kingdom of a rogue priest who scours the land with plague and fire. He is joined by a French natural philosopher, who intends to reach the equator and discover the shape of the world with a pendulum.
