= Rebecca Goss (poet) =

British poet (born 1974)

Rebecca Goss (born 1974 in Suffolk) is a British poet who was nominated for the 2013 Forward Prize for Best Collection of Poetry for Her Birth. She was one of the Poetry Book Society's 20 poets of the next generation and in 2015 was nominated for the Warwick Prize for Writing.

== Bibliography ==
=== Poetry ===
- —— (2010). The Anatomy of Structures. Flambard Press.
- —— (2013). Her Birth. Carcanet Press.
- —— (2019). Girl. Carcanet Press.

==== Collaborations ====
- ——; Routledge, Chris (2018). Carousel. Guillemot Press.

== Award nominations ==
- Forward Prize (2013)
- Warwick Prize for Writing (2015)
