= Luna: Moon Rising =

2019 science fiction novel by Ian McDonald

- US first edition cover
- Author: Ian McDonald
- Audio read by: Adam Verner
- Cover artist: Victor Mosquera
- Language: English
- Genre: Science fiction
- Publisher: Tor Books
- Publication date: 19 March 2019
- Publication place: United States; United Kingdom
- Media type: Print; E-book; Audiobook
- Pages: 449
- ISBN: 978-0-76539-147-6
- Preceded by: Luna: Wolf Moon

Luna: Moon Rising is a 2019 science fiction novel by British author Ian McDonald. The sequel to Luna: Wolf Moon (2017), it continues that book's story of the fallen Corta family, whose remaining members struggle for survival and revenge in the aftermath of their destruction at the hands of their enemies on the Moon. Moon Rising was released on 19 March 2019.

== Setting ==
In the future, a near feudal colony has risen up around the industrialisation of the Moon, and though technology keeps the deadly natural environment at bay, the four basic essentials of life—air, water, carbon and data—come at a price. Tiny "chibs" placed in the eye to meter usage of these Four Elementals serve as a constant reminder of this. Everyone also has a "familiar": a personalized, holographic avatar that hovers over one shoulder and serves as an interface with the Moon's network, other familiars, and even one's physical surroundings. There is only contract law and no criminal law, and everything from marriage to divorce to murder is infinitely negotiable; the culture of the Moon's elite features polysexual and polyamorous relationships accented with cocktails, designer drugs, and 3D printed vintage couture. Under contracts granted by the Lunar Development Corporation (LDC), the Moon has been controlled by five families: the Australian Mackenzies dominate mineral extraction, the Asamoahs of Ghana control a vast underground agricultural industry, the Russian Vorontsovs run the transportation systems, the Suns of China are masters of technology, and the upstart Brazilian Cortas mine helium-3 to power Earth's fusion reactors. In Luna: New Moon, the Suns manipulate the Mackenzies and the Cortas to reignite their long-simmering rivalry; the Corta empire is destroyed, and its members killed or scattered. In Luna: Wolf Moon, the Mackenzies begin turning on each other, and Lucas Corta initiates a plan to pit the four remaining families against each other and seize control of the Moon himself.

== Plot ==
Transporting a comatose Lucasinho to his father in Meridian, Luna and the Sisters of the Lords of Now are attacked by a Mackenzie Metals security team bent on abducting Lucasinho in his medical pod. They are fought off by Santinho foot-soldiers from João de Deus, but Luna's fleeing spacecraft is downed by chain-gun fire, leaving Luna, Madrinha Elis, and Lucasinho the only survivors. Lucas, having overtaken the Moon with his terrestrial allies, is now the Eagle of the Moon. Lousika tells Lucas that the Asamoahs cannot heal Lucasinho's brain damage, but suggests that the University of Farside can, on the opposite side of the Moon. Lucas's bid in the Court of Clavius for custody of Lucasinho is opposed by his ex-wife Amanda, who is acting on behalf of the Suns. They are both thwarted by Ariel, who outmaneuvers them and has Luna declared Lucasinho's guardian. Biocyberneticists at the university give Ariel the power to walk again using a spinal device.

Alexia, Lucas's Iron Hand, goes into the impoverished upper levels of Meridian and helps the people there build an intricate but illegal system for water collection and filtration. Using the name Lê, she takes their leader, who calls himself "Jack of Blades", as her lover. She soon realizes, however, that he is the exiled Denny Mackenzie, who murdered Lucas's brother Carlinhos, and whose grandfather Alexia herself was responsible for killing. Alexia flees the situation for a meeting with the Vorontsovs and their terrestrial allies, who outline the Lunar Bourse, their plan for converting the Moon into an automated energy resource for Earth. Duncan stresses to the Vorontsovs that the remaining Dragon families must work together against the terrestrials. Gender-neutral economist Vidhya Rao, initially a supporter of the Bourse project, begins to become disillusioned with the business model, and learns the plan involves a complete depopulation of the Moon. The Three August Sages are the AI aspects of a quantum computer which makes startlingly accurate predictions of the future, created for Whitacre Goddard by the Suns. Vidhya is the only human with whom the Sages will communicate, but when e learns that the depopulation effort will utilize deadly plagues, the Three August Sages and Whitacre Goddard attempt to assassinate er. Vidhya is aided in er escape by Madam Sun, an avatar of Lady Sun that exists in the system thanks to a backdoor. Vidhya seeks Ariel's help convincing Lucas to break ties with the terrestrials and oppose the Bourse, but Ariel wants no part of it.

On Earth, Marina is struggling to overcome the Moon's adverse effects to her body, and witnesses first-hand the distrust and hatred the terrestrials have for Moon people. She decides to go back to the Moon, but the Defence Intelligence Agency tries to make her return contingent on her being their spy. Marina's sister Kessie lends her the money she needs for the ticket, and Marina secretly travels to a launch facility in Canada so she can depart before the DIA is able to do anything to stop her.

The Suns accelerate the activation of their Sun Ring, a huge band of solar energy collectors that spans the circumference of the Moon, to undercut the terrestrials by securing a significant share of the Earth's energy market. Duncan and his entourage are killed in the destruction of the Suns' Pavilion of Eternal Light, presumably orchestrated by his absent brother Bryce. Darius and Denny each claim Mackenzie Metals for their own, and a battle between Denny's new Mackenzie jackaroos and Darius's Sun soldiers ends in Denny's victory. Bryce threatens Analiese's family if she does not thwart Wagner and hand over Robson. She complies, but the thugs who take Robson kill her anyway. Wagner seeks help from Lucas, who conspires to assassinate Bryce. Alexia brings Robson's friend Haider to visit him, and Haider slips Robson a set of poisoned needles. Bryce summons Robson with the intent of having sex with the boy, but Robson kills him with the needles, and Lucas retakes João de Deus from the Mackenzies. Ariel serves Lucas with a formal challenge to trial by combat to settle Lucasinho's case. Lucas, in turn, serves a challenge to Amanda. Lucas's champion, or zashitnik, is renowned knife-fighter Mariano Gabriel Demaria, who easily defeats the zashitnik of the Suns, and Amanda's claim is dismissed. Ariel, a lawyer with no combat skills, surprises everyone by stepping in for her own zashitnik. As Ariel hoped, Lucas does the same to keep Mariano from eviscerating his sister. The Cortas break their knives on the fighting floor and move to negotiate. Ariel offers Lucas custody of Lucasinho in exchange for Ariel replacing him as Eagle of the Moon. Lucas agrees, and gives Ariel the codes to control the terrestrials' new combat bots, which he acquired by way of a deal with Amanda.

The Corta entourage, fleeing on a ship with Nik Vorontsov, are pursued by older combat bots immune to Ariel's codes. Luna's ghazi escort Dakota and Ariel's zashitnik Rosario don sasuits and neutralize two dangerous bots sabotaging the ship from out on the hull. Later, Lucas asks Ariel why she wanted to be the Eagle, and she tells him about Vidhya's warning. Ariel has all the terrestrial representatives on the Moon brought to Boa Vista as leverage in her negotiations with Earth. She abolishes the Four Elementals, making air, water, carbon, and data free for everyone on the Moon.

== Characters ==
- Lucas Corta, the Corta family's eldest surviving member, now the Eagle of the Moon
- Lucasinho Corta, Lucas's son and heir
- Wagner Corta, Lucas's youngest and only surviving brother
- Ariel Corta, Lucas's sister, a lawyer in the Court of Clavius
- Robson Corta, orphaned son of Rafa Corta and Rachel Mackenzie
- Lousika Asamoah, Rafa Corta's second wife
- Luna Corta, Lousika's young daughter by Rafa
- Alexia Corta, Lucas's cousin from Earth who serves as his Iron Hand
- Duncan Mackenzie, CEO of Mackenzie Metals
- Denny Mackenzie, son of Duncan and Apollonaire, exiled from the Mackenzie family
- Bryce Mackenzie, Duncan's brother and Head of Finance of Mackenzie Metals
- Darius Mackenzie, Duncan's young half brother, the son of Robert Mackenzie and Jade Sun
- Cixi, Lady Sun, the Dowager of Taiyang, matriarch of the Sun family
- Marina Calzaghe, Ariel's former bodyguard
- Vidhya Rao, a gender-neutral economist, consultant to Whitacre Goddard bank and member of the Pavilion of the White Hare
- Abena Asamoah, Lucasinho's former lover, now legal assistant to Ariel
- Analiese Mackenzie, Wagner's lover
- Mariano Gabriel Demaria, the greatest knife-fighter on the Moon and the director of the School of Seven Bells
- Dakota Kaur Mackenzie: a warrior/scholar, or ghazi, of the Faculty of Biocybernetics at the University of Farside
- Rosario Salgado O'Hanlon de Tsiolkovski, a failed ghazi, and zashitnik to Ariel Corta

== Publication ==
The third novel in a trilogy, Luna: Moon Rising was preceded by Luna: New Moon in 2015, and Luna: Wolf Moon in 2017. The first two chapters were excerpted by Tor.com in January 2019.

Luna: Moon Rising was released in the US by Tor Books on 19 March 2019.

== Reception ==
Publishers Weekly praised McDonald's worldbuilding and characterization, but noted that readers not familiar with the previous novels in the series may "have difficulty mastering the intricacies of the setting and story". Liz Bourke of Tor.com agreed that it would be more difficult to read the novel out of sequence, but wrote that "McDonald's worldbuilding is sharp and glittering, with particular attention to culture".

=== Awards and nominations ===
Luna: Moon Rising was nominated for the 2020 Locus Award for Best Science Fiction Novel.
