= Warwick Prize for Writing =

International literary prize

The Warwick Prize for Writing was an international literary prize, worth £25,000, that was given biennially for writing excellence in the English language, in any genre or form, on a theme that changes with every award. It was launched by the University of Warwick in July 2008. Past nominations included scientific research, novels, poems, e-books and plays. Works were open to be nominated by staff, students and alumni of Warwick University, and since 2014, the publishing industry.

== The Prize Management Group ==
The Prize Management Group of the Warwick Prize for Writing was made up of senior professors and administrative staff drawn from across the faculties and included the Vice-Chancellor of the University of Warwick. The Prize Management Group was responsible for the administration of the prize, including agreeing the rules, the guidelines for the judges and the arrangements for the award of the prize. The Prize Management Group was also responsible for choosing the judging panel.

== History ==
=== 2009 ===
The theme for the inaugural Warwick Prize for Writing was "complexity". A longlist of 20 candidate titles was announced in November 2008, followed by a shortlist of six titles announced on 22 January 2009. The winner, Naomi Klein's The Shock Doctrine, was announced on 24 February 2009.

China Miéville, award-winning writer of weird fiction, chaired the panel of five judges. Professor Ian Stewart, Professor of Mathematics at the University of Warwick, provided a vital link between the Prize Management Group and the Judging Panel. The journalist Maya Jaggi, author and translator Maureen Freely and literary blogger Stephen Mitchelmore completed the Judging Panel.

=== 2011 ===
Michael Rosen chaired the panel of five judges for the 2011 Warwick Prize for Writing, and was joined by the Vice-Chancellor of the University of Warwick, Professor Nigel Thrift, award-winning author Jenny Uglow, Times Literary Editor Erica Wagner and writer, cultural critic, public speaker and broadcaster Baroness Lola Young.

The theme for the 2011 award was "colour". The winning book was Dazzled and Deceived: Mimicry and Camouflage.

=== 2013 ===
The judges for the Warwick Prize for Writing 2013 were Ian Sansom of the Department of English and Comparative Literary Studies at the University of Warwick (chair), Marina Warner CBE and Ed Byrne, Vice-Chancellor and President of Monash University in Melbourne, Australia.

2013 was the first time the prize was won by a poet.

=== 2015 ===
The 2015 judging panel was chaired by A. L. Kennedy, accompanied by author and academic Robert Macfarlane, actress and director Fiona Shaw, physician and writer Gavin Francis, and Lonely Planet founder Tony Wheeler.

The theme for the 2015 prize was "Instinct". The winning book was Redeployment by Phil Klay.

== Winners and nominees ==
Year	Author	Translator(s)	Title	Result	Ref.
2009	Naomi Klein		The Shock Doctrine: The Rise of Disaster Capitalism	Won	
2009	Lisa Appignanesi		Mad, Bad and Sad: A History of Women and the Mind Doctors from 1800	Shortlist	
2009	Francisco Goldman		The Art of Political Murder: Who Killed Bishop Gerardi?	Shortlist	
2009	Stuart Kauffman		Reinventing the Sacred	Shortlist	
2009	Alex Ross		The Rest Is Noise: Listening to the 20th Century	Shortlist	
2009	Enrique Vila-Matas	Jonathan Dunne	Montano's Malady	Shortlist	
2009	Michael Blastland and Andrew Dilnot		The Tiger That Isn't	Longlist	
2009	John Burnside		Glister	Longlist	
2009	Mike Davis		Planet of Slums	Longlist	
2009	Rachel Blau DuPlessis		Torques: Drafts 58–76	Longlist	
2009	John Hughes		Someone Else	Longlist	
2009	Thomas Legendre		The Burning	Longlist	
2009	David N. Livingstone		Adam's Ancestors: Race, Religion and the Politics of Human Origins	Longlist	
2009	Robert Macfarlane		The Wild Places	Longlist	
2009	James Martin		The Meaning of the 21st Century	Longlist	
2009	Ian McDonald		Brasyl	Longlist	
2009	Joseph O'Neill		Netherland	Longlist	
2009	Juan Gabriel Vásquez	Anne McLean	The Informers	Longlist	
2009	Ivan Vladislavic		Portrait with Keys	Longlist	
2009	James Walvin		The Trader, The Owner, The Slave	Longlist	
2011	Peter Forbes		Dazzled and Deceived: Mimicry and Camouflage	Won	
2011	Nadeem Aslam		The Wasted Vigil	Shortlist	
2011	Aminatta Forna		The Memory of Love	Shortlist	
2011	Peter D. McDonald		The Literature Police: Apartheid Censorship and its Cultural Consequences	Shortlist	
2011	Michael Taussig		What Color is the Sacred?	Shortlist	
2011	Derek Walcott		White Egrets	Shortlist	
2011	Mark Bradley		Colour and Meaning in Ancient Rome	Longlist	
2011	Jasper Fforde		Shades of Grey	Longlist	
2011	Rachel Polonsky		Molotov's Magic Lantern	Longlist	
2011	Lisa Robertson		Lisa Robertson's Magenta Soul Whip	Longlist	
2011	Iain Sinclair		Hackney, That Rose Red Empire	Longlist	
2013	Alice Oswald		Memorial	Won	
2013	Jim Al-Khalili		Pathfinders: The Golden Age of Arabic Science	Shortlist	
2013	Amy Espeseth		Sufficient Grace	Shortlist	
2013	Cordelia Fine		Delusions of Gender	Shortlist	
2013	Etgar Keret		Suddenly, a Knock on the Door	Shortlist	
2013	Robert Macfarlane		The Old Ways	Shortlist	
2013	Julian Barnes		The Sense of an Ending	Longlist	
2013	Jonathan Franzen		Freedom	Longlist	
2013	Amitav Ghosh		River of Smoke	Longlist	
2013	Robert Gray		Cumulus	Longlist	
2013	Thomas Keneally		The Daughters of Mars	Longlist	
2013	Nidaa Khoury		Book of Sins	Longlist	
2015	Phil Klay		Redeployment	Won	
2015	Karen Joy Fowler		We Are All Completely Beside Ourselves	Shortlist	
2015	Rebecca Goss		Her Birth	Shortlist	
2015	Karl Ove Knausgaard	Don Bartlett	A Man in Love	Shortlist	
2015	Marilynne Robinson		Lila	Shortlist	
2015	Mark Vanhoenacker		Skyfaring	Shortlist	
2015	Sara Baume		Spill Simmer Falter Wither	Longlist	
2015	Lyndall Gordon		Divided Lives: Dreams of a Mother and a Daughter	Longlist	
2015	Cynan Jones		The Dig	Longlist	
2015	Armand Marie Leroi		The Lagoon: How Aristotle Invented Science	Longlist	
2015	Louise Stern		Ismael and His Sisters	Longlist	
2015	Bryan Stevenson		Just Mercy: A Story of Justice and Redemption	Longlist	
2015	Jeff VanderMeer		Annihilation	Longlist	

== See also ==
- List of British literary awards
- List of literary awards
