= Luna: New Moon =

2015 science fiction novel by Ian McDonald

- UK first edition cover
- Author: Ian McDonald
- Audio read by: Soneela Nankani; Thom Rivera; Suzanne Toren
- Language: English
- Genre: Science fiction
- Publisher: Gollancz (UK)/Paperback; Tor (US)/Hardcover
- Publication date: 17 September 2015 (UK); 22 September 2015 (US)
- Publication place: United Kingdom; United States
- Media type: Print; E-book; Audiobook
- Pages: 416
- ISBN: 978-1-473-20223-8 (UK); 978-0-765-37551-3 (US)
- Followed by: Luna: Wolf Moon

Luna: New Moon is a 2015 science fiction novel by British author Ian McDonald. It is the first of a three-part series that also includes Luna: Wolf Moon and Luna: Moon Rising. The novel explores the dangerous intrigue that surrounds the powerful Corta dynasty, one of the five families who control industry on the Moon. Optioned for development as a television series before it was released, the novel has been called "Game of Thrones in space".

== Setting ==
In the future, a near feudal colony has risen up around the industrialisation of the Moon, and though technology keeps the deadly natural environment at bay, the four basic essentials of life—air, water, carbon and data—come at a price. Tiny "chibs" placed in the eye to meter usage of these Four Elementals serve as a constant reminder of this. Everyone also has a "familiar": a personalized, holographic avatar that hovers over one shoulder and serves as an interface with the Moon's network, other familiars, and even one's physical surroundings. There is only contract law and no criminal law, and everything from marriage to divorce to murder is infinitely negotiable; the culture of the Moon's elite features polysexual and polyamorous relationships accented with cocktails, designer drugs, and 3D printed vintage couture. The Moon is controlled by five families, dubbed the Five Dragons: the Australian Mackenzies dominate mineral extraction, the Asamoahs of Ghana control a vast underground agricultural industry, the Russian Vorontsovs run the transportation systems, the Suns of China are masters of technology, and the upstart Brazilian Cortas mine helium-3 to power Earth's fusion reactors. These families, and all citizens of the Moon, operate under contracts granted by the Lunar Development Corporation (LDC), the Moon's governing body. The Mackenzies and the Cortas—the oldest and the newest lunar families, respectively—are bitter rivals, and as the novel begins, the long-simmering animosity between them seems reignited.

== Plot ==
Young Corta scion Lucasinho has survived the "Moon-run"—a naked and unprotected ceremonial dash through the Moon's vacuum—and the Cortas assemble to celebrate, with members of the other Five Dragon families in attendance. An assassination attempt on Rafa Corta, the heir to the dynasty, is foiled by temporary employee Marina Calzaghe. Lucasinho escapes the locked-down Corta palace, and his finances are cut off by his controlling father, Rafa's harsh and calculating younger brother Lucas. The next youngest Corta brother, Carlinhos, oversees newly-hired Marina's training in the Corta Hélio mining operation, while his youngest brother Wagner—currently disowned—tries to determine the source of the threat against Rafa. Corta sister Ariel, a prominent lawyer in the Court of Clavius, is welcomed into an organization of power brokers known as the White Hare. Meanwhile, matriarch Adriana Corta is secretly dying, and fears that her children may destroy each other before her enemies can.

Mackenzie patriarch Robert forces a marriage contract between eleven-year-old Robson Corta—son of Rafa and his estranged wife, Robert's granddaughter Rachel—and an adult male adopted member of the Mackenzie family. Rachel is killed helping Robson escape to Rafa. The Cortas snatch a lucrative helium-3 claim out from under the Mackenzies, who begin sabotaging Corta resources with the help of their Vorontsov allies. Lucas settles a $20 million divorce from his wife Amanda Sun in hopes of marrying musician Jorge, who loves Lucas but is too intimidated by the family to accept the proposal. Jonathan Kayode, the leader of the LDC called the "Eagle of the Moon", forces the Cortas to agree to marry Lucasinho to Rachel's half-brother Denny Mackenzie by threatening their rights to the new claim. Though Jonathan claims his motive to be peace between the families, Ariel is aware that he is being controlled by his husband Adrian Mackenzie, Denny's brother. Ariel is subsequently stabbed, though thanks to Marina the attack is not fatal. Adriana dies peacefully, leaving her children on tenuous ground with each other and their enemies.

Lucasinho jilts Denny at the altar and seeks sanctuary with the Asamoah family, from whom he is owed a debt for saving one of their lives. Lucas' negotiation with the Mackenzies over the insult results in a court-sanctioned duel to the death between Carlinhos and Hadley Mackenzie, Robert's youngest son. Carlinhos kills Hadley, and a long planned plot by the Mackenzies to destroy the Cortas is immediately set in motion. The Mackenzies bomb the city of João de Deus and the subterranean Corta mansion Boa Vista, and send squads of killers to eliminate the Cortas. An Asamoah robotic spider saves Lucasinho from two assassins, while Marina flees with a semi-paralyzed Ariel in tow. Wagner is warned of the attack by his Mackenzie lover Analiese, but Carlinhos is outnumbered and Denny slits his throat. After ensuring that his children Robson and Luna are safe, Rafa dies in the destruction of Boa Vista. Lucas is trapped in a rover on the Moon's surface after it is hacked by his ex-wife Amanda, who reveals that she and her family have been behind the assassination attempts as part of their plan to manipulate the Cortas and Mackenzies into destroying each other. Amanda leaves him to die in the rover, but Lucas attempts a five meter Moon-run through vacuum to the hatch of a moonloop terminal. He is successful, and flees to a tiny satellite from where he can plot his revenge.

== Characters ==
- Adriana Corta, matriarch of the Corta family and founder of the Corta Hélio corporation
- Rafa Corta, Adriana's charismatic and volatile eldest son
- Lucas Corta, her harsh and calculating second son
- Ariel Corta, Adriana's only daughter, a prominent lawyer in the Court of Clavius
- Carlinhos Corta, Adriana's dashing son who works directly in the family's helium-3 mining operations
- Wagner, the youngest Corta son, a "lone wolf" on the outs with Adriana and Lucas
- Lucasinho Corta, Lucas' beautiful and self-indulgent son who is just coming of age in the family
- Rachel Mackenzie, Rafa's estranged wife and the daughter of Duncan Mackenzie and Anastasia Vorontsov
- Lousika Asamoah, Rafa's second wife
- Amanda Sun, Lucas' wife and Lucasinho's mother
- Robson Corta, Rafa's young son by Rachel Mackenzie
- Luna Corta, Rafa's young daughter by Lousika Asamoah
- Marina Calzaghe, Corta Hélio surface worker
- Jonathan Kayode, Eagle of the Moon, president of the Lunar Development Corporation
- Adrian Mackenzie, eldest son of Duncan Mackenzie and Apollonaire Vorontsov, husband to Jonathan Kayode
- Robert Mackenzie, centenarian Mackenzie patriarch and founder of Mackenzie Metals
- Duncan Mackenzie, son of Robert and Alyssa, father to Rachel and Denny and CEO of Mackenzie Metals
- Denny Mackenzie, son of Duncan and Apollonaire
- Bryce Mackenzie, Robert's son and Head of Finance of Mackenzie Metals
- Jade Sun, second wife of Robert Mackenzie
- Hadley Mackenzie, son of Robert and Jade
- Analiese Mackenzie, Wagner's lover
- Jorge Nardes, musician and Lucas' lover
- Grigori Vorontsov, one of Lucasinho's classmates and male lovers
- Kojo Asamoah, one of Lucasinho's classmates and male lovers
- Abena Asamoah, Kojo's sister and the object of Lucasinho's desire
- Heitor Pereira, Corta Hélio's Head of Security
- Helen de Braga, Corta Hélio's Head of Finance

== Concept and development ==
McDonald said of Luna: New Moon in August 2014, "I'm still writing about developing economies, it’s just that this one happens to be on the Moon." Before critics called the novel "Game of Thrones in space", McDonald himself dubbed it "Game of Domes" and "Dallas in space". Of his inspiration for the story, he said:

It was basically Gary K. Wolfe who was responsible for it. On an ancient Coode Street podcast about invigorating stale subgenres in science fiction, he said he’d love to see a new take on the moonbase story. I don’t know why, but I’ve always loved moon stories ... I thought about it, and Enid, my partner, was watching TV, the new version of Dallas ... My book is Dallas on the moon, so it’s got five big industrial family corps on the moon, called the five dragons, and it’s about their intrigues and battles.

Explaining that Luna's structure was influenced by the films The Godfather and The Godfather Part II, McDonald cited the novel's "corporate intrigue, with a family matriarch getting old but not ready to pass, because there will be a power vacuum", as well as its "battling brothers, basically the Thor/Loki relationship, with the charismatic older brother and the clever younger one." In the isolated environment of the Moon, the author establishes that there is only contract law and no criminal law, and every aspect of life is negotiable: "You can be married to three different people at the same time with three different contracts". He set the novel in the early years of the 22nd century, and modeled the Moon's underground cities on the construction of Dubai. McDonald noted, "The cities and culture of Luna may seem impossibly advanced but a quick look at the history of technology shows that tech can make astonishing advances in a couple of decades ... twenty years ago [in Dubai], there were none of the towers, superhighways, dodgy geoengineering, and Ferrari police cars we see today. The world works faster than we think." He wrote, "When I began writing Luna, I knew I would be building a world from scratch, but also one that adhered to the constraints of the physical realities of the Moon ... I wanted those facts to shape the world and lives of my characters, from low gravity to moon dust, which is seriously nasty stuff ... Hard science technically shapes the lives, loves, jealousies and ambitions of every one of my moon's one point seven million citizens." To this end, he instituted what he calls "a ticking clock", explaining that "if you’re on the Moon for more than two years, your bone structure and musculature will degenerate to the point to where it’s not safe to go back to Earth again, so everyone who goes there to work has to decide, 'Do I stay or do I go?'" McDonald also determined that spirits would be more efficient to produce on the Moon than wine or beer, which influenced his cultural setting:

My Moon is a cocktail culture. The underground cities run on three different time zones so it’s always Happy Hour somewhere ... And so, Dior. Because when you picture a Martini glass, you picture it in the gloved hand of Audrey Hepburn ... I didn’t want a Moon of people in coveralls and shorts and tank tops—these are people who have mastered 3D printing. If you can print clothes, why not in the style of one of the most elegant eras in fashion history? The 1950s. Dior and Balenciaga, Balmain and Jacques Fath.

Science fiction editor and critic Gary K. Wolfe noted in Locus, "[McDonald's] moon colony is resolutely multicultural ... The polyglot moon dialect draws not only on Portuguese and English, but on Chinese, Yoruba, Russian, Spanish, and other languages. Corporate titles are borrowed from Korean, marriage contracts from Arabic, and names of lunar days from Hawaiian." In September 2015, McDonald described his lunar society as "close to ours ... but shaped by its environment, economy and society into one very very different from ours". Wanting to illustrate the various aspects of life on the Moon—industry, economy, social interactions and day-to-day conditions—McDonald noted the importance of the character Marina Calzaghe, a newcomer to the Moon. He said:

The rookie is a fantastic tool for worldbuilding without info-dumping ... [Marina] ends showing us the inner workings of lunar industry, society, law, sex, marriage and the Corta family. Marina is our eyes, ears, fears and hopes. Our way into a dangerous, strange and seductive world. She has all-areas access, and she naturally, organically and without any info-dumps, shows us now the Moon works, because she needs to learn. And we root for her. We always root for the blue-collar hero.

== Publication ==
Luna: New Moon was released in paperback by Gollancz in the UK on 17 September 2015, and in hardcover by Tor in the US on 22 September 2015. It is the first volume of a planned trilogy. A sequel, Luna: Wolf Moon, was released in March 2017.

McDonald previously published the prequel novelette "The Fifth Dragon", featuring a young Adriana Corta, in the 2014 anthology Reach for Infinity. The short work was made available for free at Tor.com on 1 September 2015.

== Television adaptation ==
McDonald said of Luna in August 2014, "It's also developing in parallel as a TV project with a company I’ve worked with before. There’s a gap in the market for an SF series that doesn't look like science fiction, if you know what I mean." Before the novel's September 2015 release, Deadline Hollywood reported in August 2015 that it had been optioned for development as a television series by writer-producer Shane Brennan and CBS Television Studios.

== Reception ==
Reviews of Luna: New Moon have been positive, with multiple critics calling it "Game of Thrones in space". Cory Doctorow wrote for Boing Boing:

Ian McDonald's never written a bad novel, but this is a great Ian McDonald novel ... [it has] the fashion sense of William Gibson, the design sense of Bruce Sterling, the eye for family drama of Connie Willis, the poesie of Bradbury, and the dirty sex of Kathe Koja and Samuel Delany. McDonald's moon is omnisexual, kinky, violent, passionate, beautiful, awful, vibrant and crushing.

Adam Roberts of The Guardian called Luna "as gripping as it is colourful, and as colourful as it is nasty." Publishers Weekly praised the novel, saying "McDonald creates a complex and fascinating civilization featuring believable technology, and the characters are fully developed, with individually gripping stories." Writing for Locus, Gary K. Wolfe called Luna "the best moon novel I've seen in many years", noting that "the most relentless, merciless, unforgiving character of all is the lunar setting, which McDonald manages to present as utterly boring and absolutely terrifying at the same time." Though describing the novel's first third as "tremendously dense" and potentially inaccessible to readers, Niall Alexander of Tor.com called the book "almost monolithic in its ambition" and praises its "unadulterated greatness", writing:

In its gravitas and tension and, alas, tragedy, it’s damn near Shakespearian. Add to that all the compulsive qualities of A Song of Ice and Fire: a setting so brilliantly built and deftly embellished that buying into it isn’t ever an issue; a vast cast of characters as satisfying and sympathetic individually as they are as part of McDonald’s elaborate ensemble; and a plot composed of so many threads that you never know where it’s going to go—except that when it ends, it’s destined to end terribly.

Carrie Mok of SciFiNow wrote, "McDonald certainly shows off the well-developed Cortas to illustrate his knack for creating dynamic human relationships that encompass the whole Moon ... It's compelling and thought-provoking, and all without relying on overbearing sci-fi clichés." Comparing the novel's dynastic struggles to those of Game of Thrones and Frank Herbert's Dune, SFF World's Mark Yon called the last quarter of the book "a tour de force of heart-stopping, page turning moments". Tom Shippey of The Wall Street Journal wrote, "It’s a great scenario, lovingly detailed, and curiously attractive despite its current of unforgiving violence." Andrew Liptak of The Verge called it one of his favorite books of 2015.

=== Awards and nominations ===
Luna: New Moon won the 2016 Gaylactic Spectrum Award and was nominated for the 2015 British Science Fiction Association Award for Best Novel.
