= Out on Blue Six (novel) =

1989 novel by Ian McDonald

- First edition paperback cover
- Author: Ian McDonald
- Language: English
- Genre: Science fiction
- Publisher: Spectra
- Publication date: April 1, 1989
- Publication place: United States
- Media type: Print (Paperback)
- Pages: 320
- ISBN: 978-0-553-27763-0

Out on Blue Six is a 1989 science fiction novel by the British writer Ian McDonald, his third novel. The plot describes the adventures of groups of outcasts and "pain criminals" in the Compassionate Society, a civilization in which all forms of pain and unhappiness have been made illegal.

== Critical reception ==
The book has a small cult following. Author Cory Doctorow (who wrote the foreword to the 2014 reprint) described the book as "a 16-car pileup in Dr Seuss country, where the colliding zithermobiles are piloted by William Gibson's console cowboys and Mad Magazine caricatures". Kat Hooper, described the book as "Really bizarre".

Ian McDonald dislikes the book and has stated "I wish I hadn't written the damn thing" and that "[the book is] too forced, it tries too hard, everything is too artificial".

British radio DJ Mark Radcliffe named his 1991 radio show after this book, although the name of the book was in turn taken from an early 1980s post punk band featuring Kate Sekules.
