= Tom Sleigh =

American dramatist

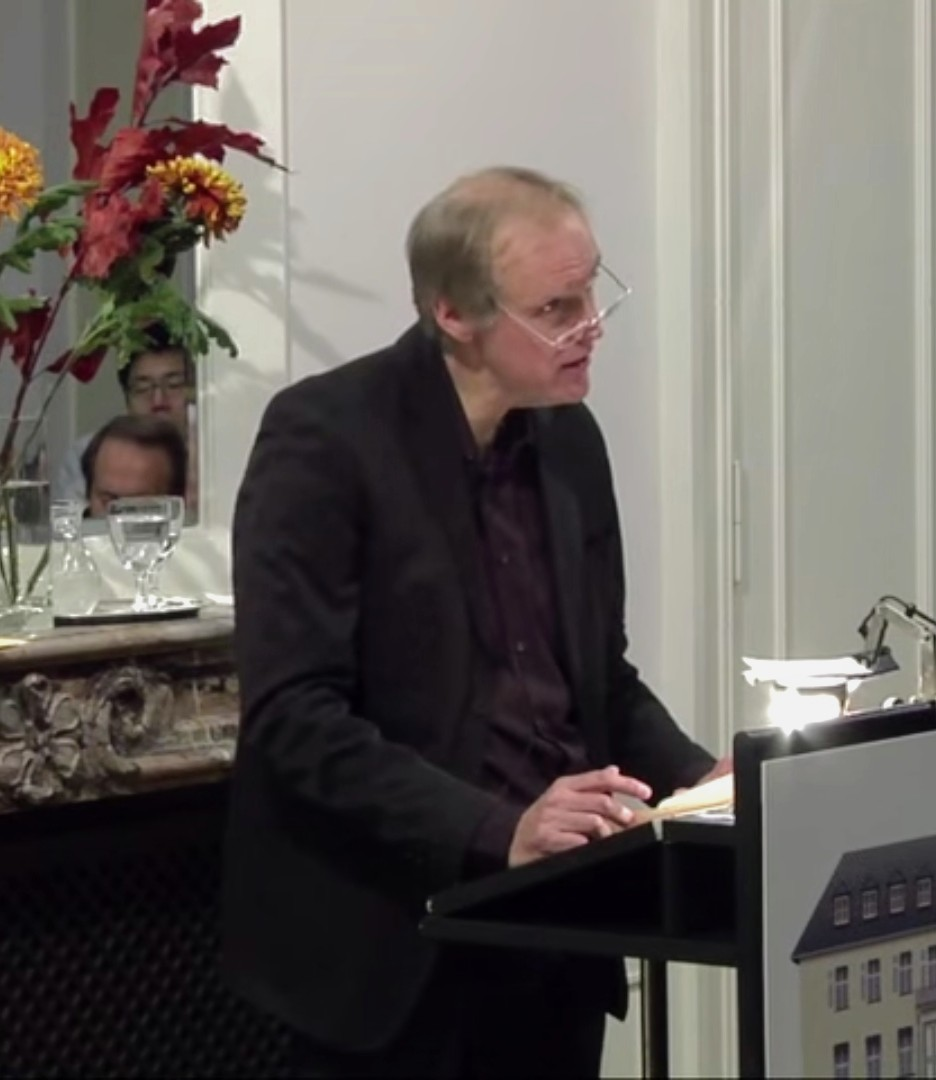
- Tom Sleigh, 2011
- Born: Mount Pleasant, Texas, US
- Occupations: Poet; essayist; professor

Tom Sleigh (/sleɪ/) is an American poet, dramatist, essayist and academic, who lives in New York City. He has published nine books of original poetry, one full-length translation of Euripides' Herakles and two books of essays. His most recent books are House of Fact, House of Ruin: Poems and The Land Between Two Rivers: Writing In an Age of Refugees (essays). At least five of his plays have been produced. He has won numerous awards, including the 2008 Kingsley Tufts Poetry Award, worth $100,000, an Academy Award from the American Academy of Arts and Letters, The Shelley Award from the Poetry Society of America, and a Guggenheim Foundation grant. He currently serves as director of Hunter College's Master of Fine Arts (MFA) program in Creative Writing. He is the recipient of the Anna-Maria Kellen Prize and Fellow at the American Academy in Berlin for Fall 2011.

== Life ==
Tom Sleigh was born in Mount Pleasant, Texas, where he lived until the age of five, when he moved to Utah. He lived in Utah until seventh grade, when he moved to California. He attended the California Institute of the Arts, Evergreen State College, and the Johns Hopkins Writing Seminars for two years, where he graduated with an MA. In his mid-twenties he moved to Massachusetts, to work at the Fine Arts Work Center in Provincetown. He began teaching at Dartmouth College in 1986 and later taught at New York University, the University of Iowa, UC-Berkeley and Johns Hopkins University. He lives in Brooklyn, New York, and serves as director of the Hunter College Master of Fine Arts Program in Creative Writing, where he also teaches poetry writing.

== Artistic influences ==
In an interview published in the literary journal AGNI, Sleigh lists his poetic influences:

I'd have to say that Browning for his technique; Wallace Stevens for a certain quality of gravitas, what Keats feels near his death, when he said he was living a sort of posthumous existence; Philip Larkin for his sense of extremity; Pound for his fluidity of conception and hardness of execution; Baudelaire for his music and intense scrutiny and affection for street life; and Bishop and Lowell for their immersion in the physical world, would be my fathers and mothers.

== Published works ==
Poetry collections

- House of Fact, House of Ruin (Graywolf Press, 2017)
- Station Zed (Graywolf Press, 2015)
- Army Cats (Graywolf Press, 2011)
- Space Walk (Houghton Mifflin Company, 2007)
- Bula Matari/Smasher of Rocks (Arrowsmith Press, 2005)
- Far Side of the Earth (Houghton Mifflin Company, 2003)
- The Dreamhouse (University of Chicago Press, 1999)
- The Chain (University of Chicago Press, 1996)
- Waking (University of Chicago Press, 1990)
- After One (Houghton Mifflin Company, 1983)

Prose works

- ROSIE: A Memoir of Farewell (Unbound Edition Press, 2026)
- The Land Between Two Rivers: Writing in an Age of Refugees (Graywolf Press, 2017)
- Interview with a Ghost (Graywolf Press, 2006)

Dramatic works

- Ice Trucker Pilgrimage, a multi-media opera (presented at San Francisco Film Festival 2006)
- The Knowledge and Conversation of My Holy Guardian Angel, or an Old-Fashioned Love Story (produced in 2004, New York Fringe Theater Festival)
- Rubber (performed at the Midtown International Theatre Festival, Raw Space Theater, New York City, 2002; winner of "Best of the Fest" award and a 2003 OOBR Award from the Off Off Broadway Review)
- Barbarosa (staged reading at Boston University's Playwright's Theater, 1998)
- Ahab's Wife (performed at Loeb's ART Institute, Boston, 1997; and Jim Henson Foundation's International Festival of Puppet Theater, New York City, 1998)

Translations

- Herakles by Euripides (Oxford University Press USA, 2000)

== Honors and awards ==
- Kingsley Tufts Award (2008), for Space Walk
- Academy Award from the American Academy of Arts and Letters
- The Shelley Award from the Poetry Society of America
- Guggenheim Foundation Grant
- Ingram Merill Foundation Grant
- Two National Endowment for the Arts grants

== Sources ==
- http://www.bu.edu/agni/interviews/online/2003/sleigh-wong.html
- http://www.dartmouth.edu/~news/releases/2000/mar00/sleigh.html
- http://www.pshares.org/authors/author-detail.cfm?authorID=1425
- http://www.pw.org/content/poet_tom_sleigh_walks_away_100000
