= 2023 in Ireland =

- Centuries: 19th; 20th; 21st
- Decades: 2000s; 2010s; 2020s
- See also: 2023 in Northern Ireland; Other events of 2023; List of years in Ireland

Events during the year 2023 in Ireland.

== Incumbents ==
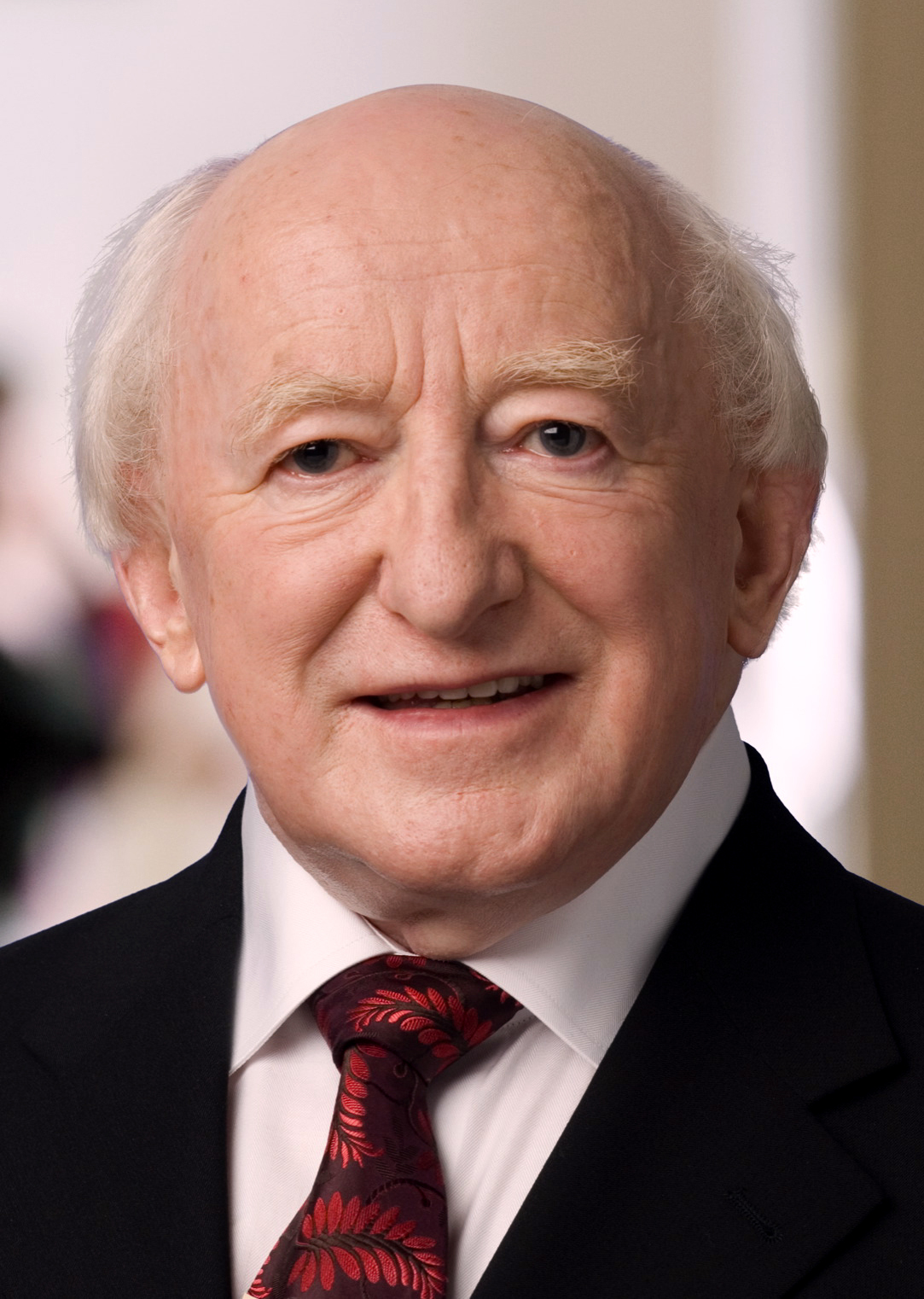
President Michael D. Higgins

- President: Michael D. Higgins
- Taoiseach: Leo Varadkar (FG)
- Tánaiste: Micheál Martin (FF)
- Minister for Finance: Michael McGrath (FF)
- Chief Justice: Donal O'Donnell
- Dáil: 33rd
- Seanad: 26th

== Events ==
=== Continuing events ===
- Irish anti-immigration protests (2022–present)

=== January ===
- 3 January – There were 931 patients without beds in Irish hospitals as the trolley crisis reached a record high.
- 4 January – The Irish data privacy board fined Meta Platforms €390 million for violations of the General Data Protection Regulation on Facebook and Instagram.
- 21 January – Thousands of people marched in Limerick to protest against continued overcrowding at University Hospital Limerick.

=== February ===
- 2 February – The President of the European Parliament Roberta Metsola began a two-day visit to Ireland. She addressed both Houses of the Oireachtas as part of the 50th anniversary (1 January 1973) of Ireland joining the European Economic Community (now the European Union), and met the president, taoiseach, and tánaiste.
- 6 February – The Lia Fáil – the coronation stone for the High Kings of Ireland on the Hill of Tara – was vandalised when the word "Fake" was spray painted on the 5,000-year-old granite stone.
- 7 February
  - Government ministers met with aviation and police authorities for briefing on illegal drone activity at Dublin Airport between 4–6 February which forced suspension of flying and diversions of flights to other airports.
  - Munster Technological University announced that it was investigating a significant breach of its information technology and telephone systems. It was later confirmed that the university suffered a ransomware cyber attack.
- 9 February
  - An Coimisiún Toghcháin (the Irish electoral commission) was established under the Electoral Reform Act 2022 to oversee elections in Ireland.
  - Microsoft announced that it would cut 120 jobs from its Irish-based workforce as part of a global cost-cutting plan.
- 12 February – Munster Technological University announced that information stolen from its computer systems in a cyber attack a week ago had appeared on the dark web.
- 18 February – Up to 50,000 people participated in an "Ireland for All" march and rally in Dublin in support of refugees and asylum seekers, and opposing racism and far-right groups.
- 21 February – The Government agreed a more targeted cost-of-living package, along with some universal payments, with €470m to be allocated for social protection measures.
- 22 February – Róisín Shortall and Catherine Murphy announced that they would stand down as co-leaders of the Social Democrats, with a successor to be appointed "at an early date." On 26 February, Holly Cairns was announced as the next leader of the party.
- 28 February – Minister for Education Norma Foley reversed a plan for Leaving Certificate candidates to sit Paper 1 of their English and Irish exams at the end of fifth year, after facing strong opposition from a number of organisations, including teacher and student representative bodies.

=== March ===
- 8 March
  - The report of a 20-year survey by The Botanical Society of Britain and Ireland revealed that 56% of Ireland's native plant species are in decline due to habitat loss, altered grazing pressure, and degradation (re-seeding, over-fertilising, nitrogen deposition, herbicides, soil drainage, mineral enrichment), rather than rising temperatures whose botanical effects – so far – are minor. By contrast, 80% of non-native plants introduced into Ireland since 1500 have increased.
  - The Taoiseach Leo Varadkar marked International Women's Day by announcing the Government's intention to hold a referendum to enshrine gender equality in the Constitution by amending Articles 40 and 41.
- 13 March – President of the United States Joe Biden announced that he will visit Ireland, north and south, in April for the 25th anniversary of the Good Friday Agreement (signed on 10 April 1998). It was reported two weeks later that Biden will arrive in Belfast on 11 April, then he will be based in Dublin from 12 to 15 April from where he will make trips to other parts of the country. Former US president Bill Clinton and his wife Hillary will visit Belfast the following week.
- 15 March – 46-year-old Stephen Silver was found guilty of the capital murder of Detective Garda Colm Horkan who was shot dead in Castlerea, County Roscommon in June 2020.
- 16 March – Ryan Tubridy announced that he would be stepping down as the presenter of The Late Late Show after 14 years, with his last show in May.
- 21 March – Leo Varadkar launched the Government's national action plan to tackle racism in response to persistent racial discrimination in Ireland. The plan drew on a report published in April 2021 by the Anti Racism Committee, established in 2020 by the Department of Children, Equality, Disability, Integration and Youth.
- 31 March
  - RTÉ announced that Radio 1 would permanently stop broadcasting on the longwave band on 14 April.
  - The Supreme Court ruled that legislation governing the election of senators to the Seanad university panels was unconstitutional due to the failure for over 40 years to legislate for the Seventh Amendment of the Constitution of Ireland.

=== April ===
- 7 April – It was announced that the Leaving Certificate grinds school, the Institute of Education in Dublin with 7,000 pupils, founded by Ray Kearns in 1969, had been sold to a British educational company.
- 9 April – An emergency was declared and flights into Dublin Airport were suspended briefly when the nose landing gear of a Ryanair flight from Liverpool to Dublin experienced a problem during landing. Four other arriving flights were diverted to Shannon Airport.

Visit by Joe Biden

- 12 April – US President Joe Biden arrived in County Louth, one of his ancestral homelands, where crowds lined the streets in Carlingford and Dundalk. This followed a visit to Northern Ireland the previous day, as part of a four-day visit to the island of Ireland.
- 13 April – Biden visited President Michael D. Higgins at Áras an Uachtaráin and Taoiseach Leo Varadkar at Farmleigh House, before addressing a joint sitting of the Oireachtas at Leinster House, with the day ending with a banquet dinner at Dublin Castle.
- 14 April – Biden visited his ancestral homeland in County Mayo, visiting Knock Shrine and Mayo Roscommon Hospice, ending with a big event with around 27,000 in attendance featuring a public address and performances by The Coronas, The Chieftains and The Academic at St Muredach's Cathedral, Ballina.

- 17 April – Gerry Hutch was found not guilty of the 2016 murder of David Byrne at the Regency Hotel.
- 19 April – The 38th Cúirt International Festival of Literature opened in Galway.
- 22 April – It was announced that an investigator with the Garda Síochána Ombudsman Commission (GSOC) had attended a party celebrating the acquittal of Gerry Hutch the previous Monday, and that he was an associate of a relation of Hutch. The officer resigned when it became known, and GSOC intitiated an investigation.
- 23 April – An incorporeal Cabinet meeting agreed to send an Emergency Consular Assistance Team to Sudan, via Djibouti – some of them leaving on the night – on a mission to evacuate 150 Irish people and their families from the armed conflict there. The team consisted of officials from the Department of Foreign Affairs and members of the Defence Forces, including Army Ranger Wing personnel.
- 24 April – Fifty Irish citizens were evacuated on French and Spanish aircraft from Khartoum in Sudan to safety in Djibouti. It was announced that Ireland had purchased two Airbus C295 maritime patrol aircraft capable of future airlift missions, while Airbus will supply an additional military transport aircraft to Ireland in 2025.
- 25 April
  - Seventy-two Irish citizens and their families were rescued with the help of France and Spain from violence in Sudan to safety in Djibouti and Jordan.
  - An Irish metal and polymer lunar soil experiment produced by the Dublin City University School of Chemical Sciences was lost when the Japanese Hakuto-R Mission 1 Moon landing spacecraft carrying the Rashid Lunar Rover built by the United Arab Emirates stopped communicating during the final moments of an automated Moon landing attempt in the Atlas Crater.
- 26 April – Sixteen more Irish citizens and their family members were rescued since the day before via Djibouti, Jordan, and Cyprus, from the fighting which broke out on 15 April in Sudan. More than 100 Irish people remained in the country.
- 30 April – After evacuating 209 Irish people and their families in the past week, the Emergency Civil Assistance Team was withdrawn from Sudan.

=== May ===
- 6 May – Michael D. Higgins and Leo Varadkar, respectively, became the first Irish president and taoiseach in history to attend the coronation of a British monarch, at Westminster Abbey in London.
- 9 May – The Irish band Wild Youth failed to qualify for the final of the Eurovision Song Contest.
- 11 May
  - EirGrid announced plans for four major wind farm projects, three in the Irish Sea off the coasts of Counties Dublin and Wicklow and one off the Atlantic coast, in Connemara. The project is part of the largest ever renewable energy project in Ireland, intended to power six million homes by 2030.
  - The High Court ruled that the diseased leg of an elderly man with dementia should not be amputated against his wishes in an attempt to save his life.
- 13 May – Taoiseach Leo Varadkar and Minister for Justice Simon Harris condemned scenes during a stand-off between pro-and anti-immigrant protesters in Dublin and a homeless asylum seekers' camp was destroyed by fire.
- 18 May
  - Taoiseach Leo Varadkar expressed his dismay for a 14-year-old boy who was subjected to an unprovoked homophobic assault by a group of teenage boys in Navan and humiliated by having the video posted online.
  - A 17-year-old boy who was attacked by a group of people using golf clubs in Bluebell, Dublin remained in a critical condition in hospital and in a coma.
- 20 May – Patrick Kielty was confirmed as the new host of RTÉ's The Late Late Show, taking over from Ryan Tubridy and becoming the show's fourth permanent presenter.
- 26 May
  - The number of homeless people in Ireland exceeded 12,000 for the first time.
  - The mother of an 18-year-old who killed himself in 2021 sued anti-vaccine campaigner Gemma O'Doherty for misrepresenting and sensationalising his death in the freesheet, The Irish Light, last year to support conspiracy theory about the COVID-19 vaccine.
- 30 May – Ireland's 2022 census figures from the CSO show an older population, increased diversity, decreased religiosity, and a population surpassing five million for the first time since the great famine.

=== June ===
- 21 June – Ahead of the unfolding secret payment scandal, the Director General of RTÉ, Dee Forbes, was suspended from her employment by the RTÉ Board, and later issued a statement defending her record.
- 22 June
  - The postal service An Post moved from its historic headquarters in the General Post Office building on O'Connell Street in Dublin to new premises at North Wall Quay.
  - RTÉ admitted that it paid its top presenter Ryan Tubridy €345,000 more than publicly declared between 2017 and 2022, in what the chair of its board said was a "serious breach of trust with the public".
- 24 June – All 30 remaining Argos retail stores in Ireland closed permanently.
- 25 June – Phase 5a of the BusConnects transport infrastructure programme was launched in Dublin
- 26 June – Dee Forbes resigned as Director-General of RTÉ with immediate effect, following ongoing controversy over undisclosed payments to broadcaster Ryan Tubridy.

=== July ===
- 3 July – Seven GAA fans were arrested and 15 others were ejected after a fight broke out on Hill 16 at Croke Park on 1 July, during the All-Ireland SFC quarter-final match between Armagh and Monaghan.
- 10 July – New RTÉ Director-General Kevin Bakhurst stood down the RTÉ Board, and appointed a new temporary leadership team.
- 16 July – The European Commission found components manufactured by Enniscorthy based electronics company Taoglas in Russian bombs used in Ukraine attacks.
- 17 July – The Maritime Area Regulatory Authority (MARA) was established in Wexford town In a press release it was noted that the new agency" will have responsibility for assessing applications for Maritime Area Consents (MACs) which will be required before developers of offshore wind and other projects in the maritime area can make a planning application."
- 19 July – Taoiseach Leo Varadkar paid a surprise visit to embattled Ukraine where he met President Volodymyr Zelenskyy, Prime Minister Denys Shmyhal, Speaker of the Verkhovna Rada (parliament) Ruslan Stefanchuk, and members of the Irish community.
- 20 July – Minister for Justice Helen McEntee condemned an unprovoked attack on a US tourist who suffered serious eye and head injuries after being punched, kicked and knocked to the ground by a group of youths in Dublin city centre.
- 25 July – An All Ireland Rail Review was published to reopen all closed railway lines on the island of Ireland.

=== August ===
- 9 August – The Health Service Executive confirmed that EG.5, a new strain of COVID-19, had been detected in Ireland.
- 11 August – RTÉ Director-General Kevin Bakhurst confirmed that legal firm McCann Fitzgerald had begun a review into voluntary redundancy schemes at the broadcaster in 2017 and 2021.
- 12 August – Three tourists from the UK were hospitalised after an assault in Temple Bar, with calls for public order gardaí to patrol every night following a number of high-profile assaults in the capital.
- 15 August – Bank of Ireland suffered a major technology breakdown which allowed customers who had no money in their accounts to get access to funds, prompting queues at some ATMs around the country, with Gardaí controversially deployed in some areas.
- 18–22 August – The Rose of Tralee International Festival was held, and won by New York Rose Roisin Wiley, giving New York its first victory in the competition since 2007, and the first US winner since 2016.
- 25 August
  - Over 62,000 students received their Leaving Certificate results, which were artificially boosted by an average of almost 8%.
  - Four young people (a man in his early 20s and three women in their teens) died after a car carrying teenagers celebrating their Leaving Certificate results spun out of control and overturned in Clonmel, County Tipperary.
- 28 August – A technical problem with the UK's air traffic service left thousands of airline passengers stranded in Ireland and around Europe causing delays and cancellations.
- 30 August – The Electoral Commission submitted its Constituency Review Report 2023 to the Oireachtas. It recommended that the number of Teachtaí Dála be increased from 160 to 174, and that the number of Dáil constituencies be increased from 39 to 43. The increases take account of a population rise of 8% since 2016.

=== September ===
- 6 September – The Minister for Agriculture, Charlie McConalogue, farming groups, and the Irish Creamery Milk Suppliers Association (ICMSA) reacted to the European Commission decision to cut Ireland's nitrates derogation limits from 250 kg of organic nitrogen per hectare to 220 kg per hectare. The ICMSA president, Pat McCormack, said that the "Government has put a nail in the coffin of many family dairy farms that have been worked for generations".
- 7 September – During an appearance on RTÉ News at One, Taoiseach Leo Varadkar said he believes Ireland is "on the path to unification" and that there will be a United Ireland in his lifetime.
- 26 September – Officials recovered 2,253 kg of cocaine after boarding MV Matthew, a Panamanian-registered ship, off the coast of Ireland. The operation was described by Gardaí as the largest drugs seizure in Ireland's history.
- 27 September – Using Dáil privilege, Mary Lou McDonald revealed details of a letter confirming a meeting between clinicians and a representative from Children's Health Ireland, concerning experimental spinal surgeries on children at Temple Street Hospital. Nineteen children had poor surgical outcomes following surgery at Temple Street, and one of children later died. Whether parental consent had been obtained is in dispute.
- 28 September – TikTok announced that it had shut down a misinformation network of 72 accounts targeting Ireland, that had over 94,000 followers, saying "the operators of the accounts posted divisive views in a bid to intensify social conflict."
- 29 September
  - Gardaí launched a murder investigation after a woman in her 40s died following a violent attack at her home in County Offaly. A 16-year-old boy, known to the victim, was arrested at the scene. The attack was filmed and posted on social media.
  - Homelessness figures were released, showing that there were 12,691 people homeless in Ireland in August – a 17% increase year-on-year – including a record 3,895 homeless children.

=== October ===
- 8 October – Tánaiste Micheál Martin said that the Department of Foreign Affairs had been in touch with the family of Kim Damti (22), an Irish-Israeli woman who was unaccounted for following the previous day's series of attacks launched by Hamas on Israel. On 11 October, Damti was confirmed dead.
- 10 October – Minister for Finance Michael McGrath and Minister for Public Expenditure, National Development Plan Delivery and Reform Paschal Donohoe announced Budget 2024, with three electricity credits for all households, a €12 increase to core social welfare payments and half-price travel for those aged under 25.
- 23 October – Yousef Palani was sentenced to two life sentences plus 20 years for the murder of two men and the stabbing of a third in Sligo, all of who he had sought out on a pretence of dating.
- 25 October – The Health Products Regulatory Authority (HPRA) said it had seized 254 units of falsified Semaglutide, a drug used for type 2 diabetes and as an unofficial aide to weight loss, during 2023.
- 27 October – Latest figures showed that homelessness in Ireland hit new records: 8,923 adults and 3,904 children accessed emergency accommodation in September 2023, bringing the total to 12,827 people.

=== November ===
- 9 November – Jozef Puška was convicted of the murder of Ashling Murphy.
- 12 November – Met Éireann issued a Status Red wind warning for 14 counties, ahead of Storm Debi warning of a "potential danger to life".
- 15 November – The Dáil voted 85–55 to reject a motion by the Social Democrats party to expel the Israeli Ambassador, Dana Erlich. A Sinn Féin party motion to refer Israel to the International Criminal Court because of its actions in Gaza was also defeated, 77–58. Social Democrats leader Holly Cairns argued during the debate that "Israel is killing with impunity. According to the World Health Organisation, Gaza is now a graveyard for children." She also stated, "Words of condemnation are not enough. We need action. There must be consequences for the crimes perpetrated by Israel on a captive civilian population in Gaza." Deputy James Browne (Fianna Fáil party) claimed in the debate that the Social Democrats' motion "seeks to push Ireland to the margins of international opinion". Meanwhile, a large crowd outside Leinster House called for the ambassador's expulsion.
- 17 November – Jozef Puška was sentenced to life imprisonment for the murder of Ashling Murphy.
- 18 November – Gardaí began a murder investigation after a 23-year-old man was shot dead in a gangland shooting in Finglas, Dublin.
- 21 November – The Minister for Justice Helen McEntee sought approval from the Cabinet for the repeal of antique censorship laws. The initiative was a response to far-reaching developments in community values since Censorship of Publications legislation was recommended by the Committee on Evil Literature, established in 1926. Modern laws will continue to allow control of indecent or obscene publications, including child abuse material, while permitting information on contraception, abortion and divorce.
- 23 November – A five-year-old girl and a woman in her 30s were seriously injured, and three others hurt, in a mass stabbing outside a primary school in Parnell Square East, Dublin. Following the knife attack, a riot took place in Dublin city centre, in which Gardaí and civilians were attacked, Garda vehicles, four Dublin Buses and a Luas tram set alight, and projectiles and fireworks were thrown at Gardaí.
- 24 November – Latest figures showed that homelessness hit new records: 9,188 adults and 3,991 children accessed emergency accommodation in October 2023, bringing the total to 13,179 people.
- 25 November – The nine-year-old Irish-Israeli girl, Emily Hand, was released from captivity by Hamas and reunited with her father after being held hostage in Palestine for 50 days. Taoiseach Varadkar and Tánaiste Martin welcomed the news.
- 26 November
  - Singer Jessica McKean represented Ireland in the Junior Eurovision Song Contest 2023, alongside Sophie Lennon, the Irish representative of the previous year, with the song "Aisling".
  - Irish author Paul Lynch won the 2023 Booker Prize with his dystopian novel Prophet Song.
  - Phase 5b of the BusConnects transport infrastructure programme was launched in Dublin

=== December ===
- 1 December – Ireland's first space satellite, EIRSAT-1, was launched from Vandenberg Space Force Base in the United States, propelled by a Falcon 9 rocket.
- 6 December – A no confidence motion in Minister for Justice Helen McEntee was tabled in the Dáil by Sinn Féin and countered with a government motion expressing confidence in the minister. The government's confidence motion won, with 83 TDs voting that they had confidence in the minister and 63 TDs voting that they did not.
- 8 December – The funeral of singer Shane MacGowan took place at St Mary's of the Rosary Catholic Church in Nenagh, County Tipperary.
- 10 December – Property and vehicles were damaged after a tornado struck Leitrim Village in County Leitrim.
- 14 December – Twelve people, including eight Transition Year students, were injured in a serious crash between a school bus and a truck in Kilkenny.
- 16 December – Gymnast Rhys McClenaghan was voted 2023 RTÉ Sports Person of the Year.
- 17 December – Gardaí began investigating a "criminal damage incident" after a fire broke out at a disused hotel in Rosscahill, Oughterard that was due to accommodate asylum seekers.
- 20 December – Tánaiste Micheál Martin announced government plans to "initiate an inter-State case against the United Kingdom under the European Convention on Human Rights" over provisions in the Northern Ireland Troubles (Legacy and Reconciliation) Act 2023 which offers immunity from prosecution for certain Troubles-era related offences.
- 22 December – Circuit Court judge Gerard O'Brien was convicted of the sexual assault of six young men when he was a secondary school teacher during the 1990s. O'Brien is also a former Fianna Fáil party councillor and former State solicitor. He was born with no arms and just one leg as a result of the drug thalidomide.
- 24 December
  - A man in his 20s died and a second man was seriously injured in a gangland gun attack at a restaurant in Blanchardstown, Dublin.
  - Two men appeared in court in Limerick in connection with a seizure of 300 kg of cocaine worth an estimated €21 million.
- 28 December – Met Éireann recorded the warmest year on record, with the overall average temperature for Ireland rising above 11 °C (51.8 °F) for the first time.

== Sport ==
=== Association football ===
==== Men's International friendly matches ====
- 22 March – Ireland 3–2 Latvia.
- 21 November – Ireland 1–1 New Zealand. The Republic of Ireland team manager, Stephen Kenny, was fired from his position, after a three-year tenure, by the Football Association of Ireland the day after the match against New Zealand. His record as manager was 11 wins, 12 draws, and 17 defeats in 40 matches.

==== Men's Euro 2024 qualification ====
- 27 March – Ireland 0–1 France.
- 16 June – Greece 2–1 Ireland. During the match in Athens, Greek supporters were asked repeatedly over the public address system to stop shining laser beams at the Irish footballers.
- 19 June – Ireland 3–0 Gibraltar.
- 7 September – France 2–0 Ireland.
- 10 September – Ireland 1–2 Netherlands.
- 13 October – Ireland 0–2 Greece.
- 16 October – Gibraltar 0–4 Ireland.
- 18 November – Netherlands 1–0 Ireland.

==== Men's Euro 2028 bid ====
- 12 April – The UK–Ireland bid to host the Euro 2028 football tournament was submitted to UEFA, with the Aviva Stadium proposed in Dublin (instead of Croke Park), alongside a redeveloped Casement Park in Belfast.
- 4 October – Turkey withdrew its bid to host Euro 2028 leaving the only remaining bid unopposed – the joint UK–Ireland one.
- 10 October – UEFA officially approved the Republic of Ireland, Northern Ireland, England, Scotland and Wales as Euro 2028 co-hosts.

==== Women's international friendly matches ====
- 22 February – China 0–0 Ireland.
- 8 April – USA 2–0 Ireland.
- 11 April – USA 1–0 Ireland.
- 22 June – Ireland 3–2 Zambia.
- 6 July – Ireland 0–3 France.
- 14 July – A friendly pre-World Cup warmup match against Colombia in Brisbane was abandoned after 20 minutes following harsh incidents by the South Americans against Denise O'Sullivan and Ruesha Littlejohn which earned the offenders yellow cards. O'Sullivan went to hospital with an injury inflicted by Colombian Daniela Caracas who said after the match that the Irish players "are little girls" ("Son unas nenas"), and "let them eat shit" ("que coman mierda").

==== Women's 2023 FIFA World Cup ====
The women's national football team made their World Cup debut in Australia.

- 20 July – Australia 1–0 Ireland (Sydney).
- 26 July – Canada 2–1 Ireland (Perth). Ireland eliminated.
- 31 July – Ireland 0–0 Nigeria (Brisbane).

==== 2023–24 UEFA Women's Nations League B ====
- 23 September – Ireland 3–0 Northern Ireland.
- 26 September – Hungary 0–4 Ireland.
- 27 October – Ireland 5–1 Albania.
- 31 October – Albania 0–1 Ireland.
- 1 December – Ireland 1–0 Hungary.
- 5 December – Northern Ireland 1–6 Ireland.

=== Gaelic games ===
==== 2023 All-Ireland Senior Hurling Championship ====
- 23 July – Defending champions Limerick defeated Kilkenny by 0–30 to 2–15 to claim their four-in-a-row in the All-Ireland SHC final.

==== 2023 All-Ireland Senior Football Championship ====
- 30 July – Dublin won their 31st All-Ireland football title after a 1–15 to 1–13 win against defending champions Kerry in the All-Ireland SFC final.

=== Rugby union ===
==== 2023 Six Nations Championship ====
- 4 February – Wales 10–34 Ireland
- 11 February – Ireland 32–19 France
- 25 February – Italy 20–34 Ireland
- 12 March – Scotland 7–22 Ireland
- 18 March – Ireland won the Grand Slam, after a 29–16 victory over England at the Aviva Stadium.

==== 2023 Rugby World Cup warm-up matches ====
- 5 August – Ireland 33–17 Italy (Dublin).
- 19 August – Ireland 29–10 England (Dublin).
- 26 August – Ireland 17–13 Samoa (Bayonne).

==== 2023 Rugby World Cup ====
- 9 September – Ireland 82–8 Romania, Nouveau Stade de Bordeaux, Bordeaux.
- 16 September – Ireland 59–16 Tonga, Stade de la Beaujoire, Nantes.
- 23 September – South Africa 8–13 Ireland, Stade de France, Saint-Denis.
- 7 October – Ireland 36–14 Scotland, Saint-Denis.
- 14 October – Ireland 24–28 New Zealand. Ireland were eliminated by New Zealand in the quarter final.

== Deaths ==
=== January ===
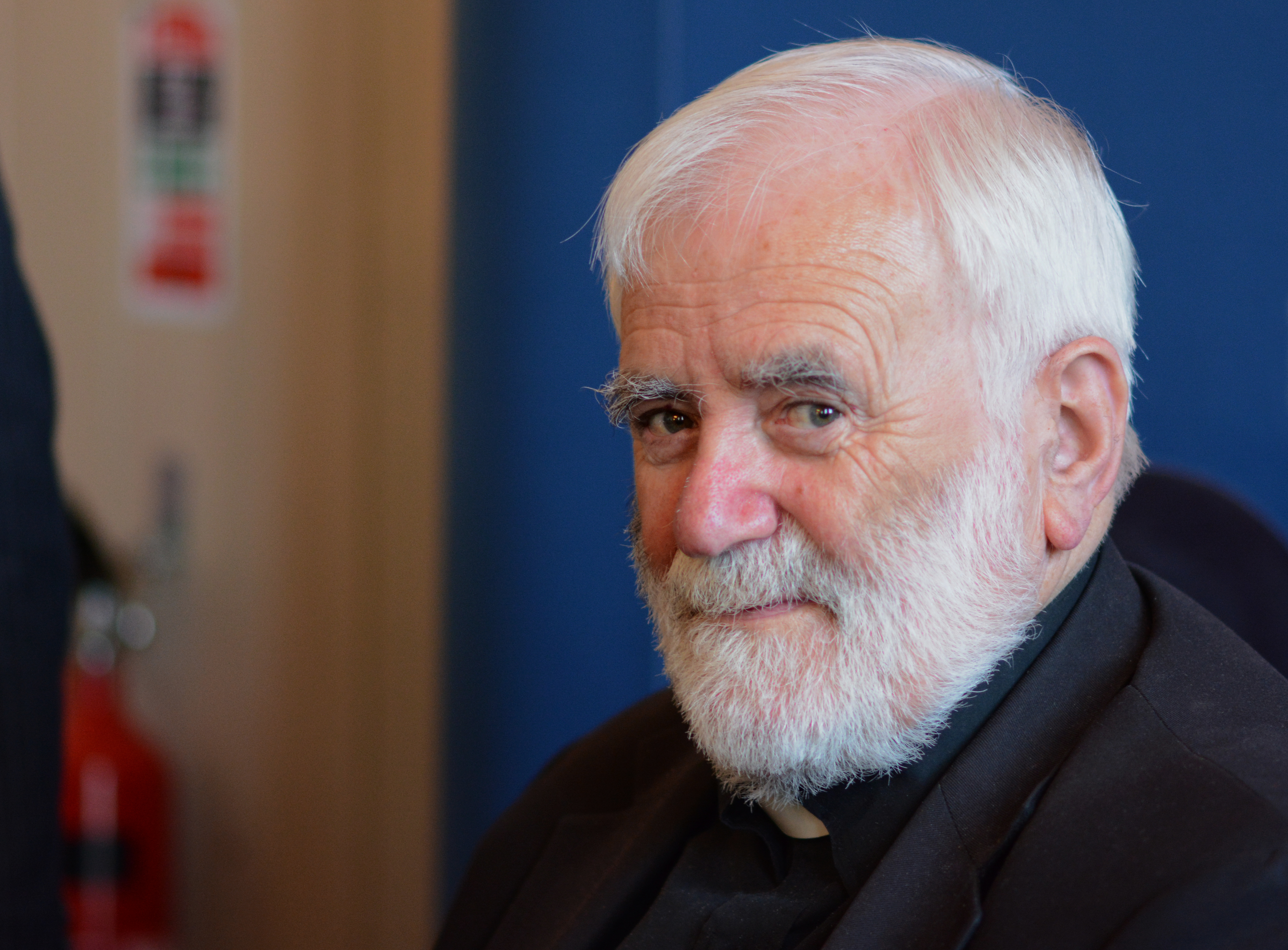
Micheál Mac Gréil

- 9 January – Séamus Begley, 73, traditional musician and singer.
- 16 January
  - Carrie Acheson, 88, politician, TD (1981–1982).
  - Joe Martin, 91, footballer (Dundalk, League of Ireland XI).
- 18 January – John L. Murray, 79, jurist, chief justice (2004–2011), judge of the Supreme Court (1999–2015) and the ECJ (1992–1999).
- 19 January
  - Bertie Cunningham, 83, Gaelic footballer (Ballivor, Meath senior team).
  - Peter Thomas, 78, footballer (Waterford, Galway United, national team). Born in England.
- 20 January – Pierce Higgins, 45, hurler (Tooreen, Ballyhaunis, Mayo senior team), motor neuron disease.
- 21 January – Micheál Mac Gréil, 91, Jesuit priest, sociologist and writer.
- 30 January – Eddie Spence, 97, Gaelic footballer (Belfast O'Connell's, Antrim senior team). Born in Northern Ireland.
- 31 January – Donie Hanlon, 85, Gaelic footballer (Gracefield, Offaly senior team).

=== February ===
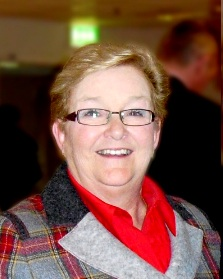
Niamh Bhreathnach

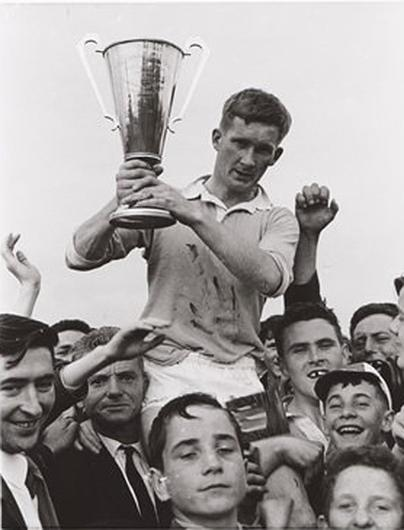
Mick Burns

- 1 February – Billy Galligan, 86, hurler (Charleville, Blackrock, Claughaun, Avondhu, Cork senior team).
- 6 February – Niamh Bhreathnach, 77, politician, TD (1992–1997), Minister for Education (1993–1994 and 1994–1997).
- 7 February – Richard Kell, 95, poet, composer and teacher.
- 11 February – Séamus Ryan, hurler (Cappamore, Limerick senior team).
- 12 February
  - James Flynn, 57, film and television producer (Vikings, The Last Duel, The Banshees of Inisherin).
  - Theo Dunne, 85, footballer (Shelbourne) and manager (UCD).
- 13 February – Deirdre Purcell, 77, actress, journalist, broadcaster and author.
- 18 February – David G. O'Connell, 69, Roman Catholic prelate, Auxiliary Bishop of Los Angeles (2015–2023).
- 22 February
  - Mick Burns, 85, hurler (Nenagh Éire Óg, Tipperary senior team, Munster).
  - Dermot Kelly, 90, hurler (Claughaun, Limerick senior team, Munster).
- 24 February – Tom Tierney, 46, rugby union player (Garryowen, Munster, Leicester, national team) and coach (women's national team).
- 26 February
  - Tony O'Donoghue, 86, athlete and broadcaster.
  - Kieron Wood, 73, barrister, journalist and writer.
- 28 February
  - Brian O'Brien, 83, rugby union player (Shannon, Munster, national team) and manager (Shannon, Munster, national team).
  - Jimmy Hatton, 88, Gaelic footballer and hurler (Kilcoole, Wicklow senior teams) and referee.

=== March ===
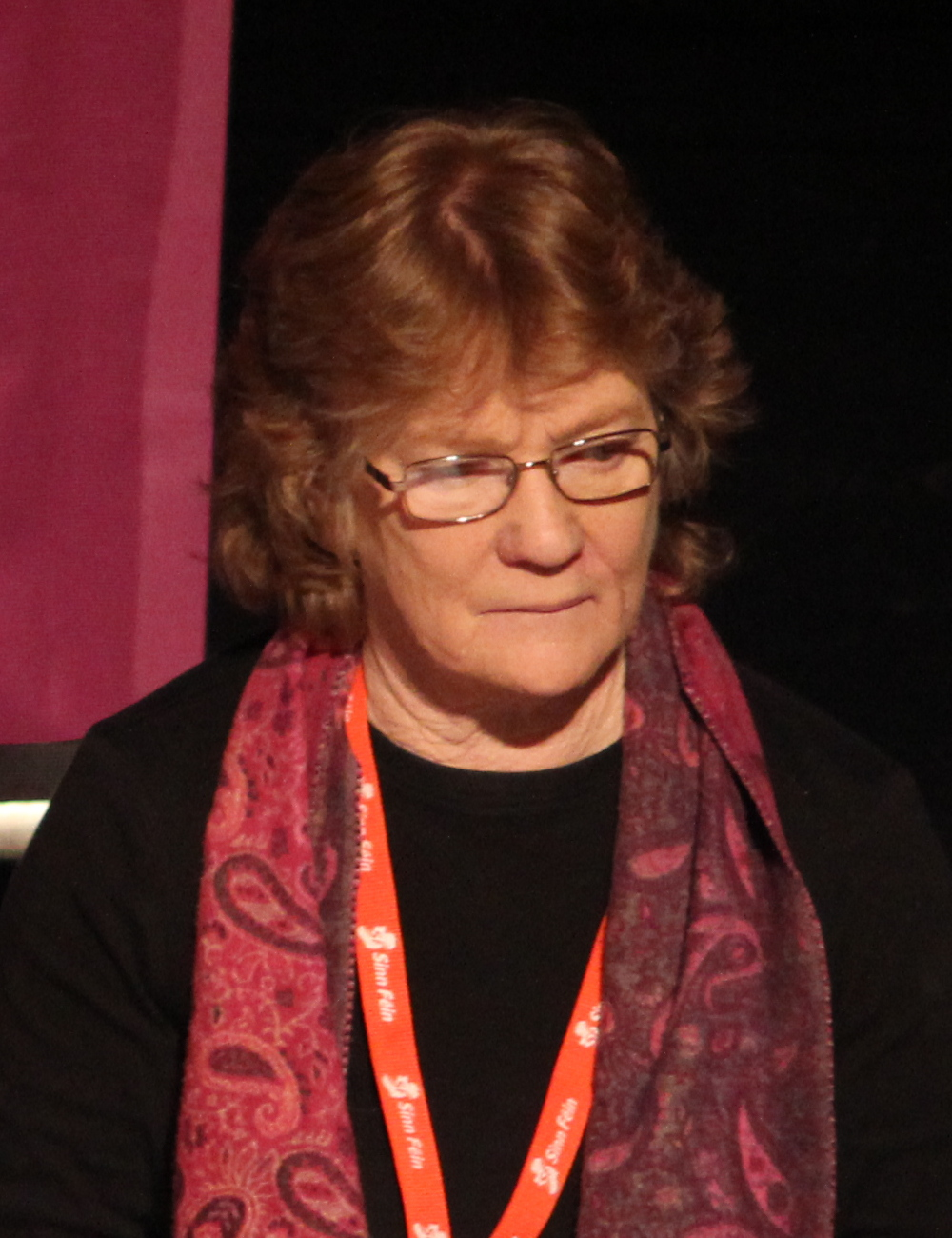
Rita O'Hare

- 2 March – Bertie O'Brien, 71, Gaelic footballer and hurler (St. Finbarr's, Cork senior teams).
- 3 March
  - Camille Souter, 93, artist.
  - Rita O'Hare, 80, Republican activist.
- 5 March – Maurice Scully, 70, poet.
- 10 March – Niall Brophy, 87, rugby union player (Leinster, national team, Lions).
- 12 March – Liam Kearns, 61, Gaelic footballer (Austin Stacks, Kerry senior team) and manager (Limerick, Laois, Tipperary, Offaly).
- 13 March – Tom Ryan, 81, hurler (Killenaule, Éire Óg, James Stephens, Tipperary senior team).
- 22 March – Marcus Wilson, 91, Gaelic footballer (St. Vincent's, Dublin senior teams).
- 25 March – Ger Glavin, 66, hurler (Midleton) and Gaelic footballer (Ballincollig, Imokilly, Cork senior team).
- 28 March – Jimmy Gray, 93, Gaelic footballer and hurler (Na Fianna, Dublin senior teams).
- 31 March – Harry Cassidy, 92, Gaelic footballer and manager (Bellaghy, Derry senior team). Born in Northern Ireland.

=== April ===
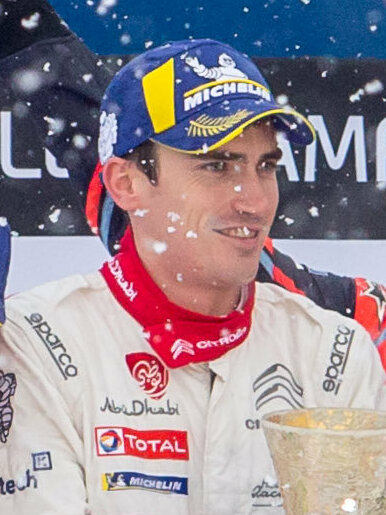
Craig Breen

- 6 April – Jim McKeever, 92, Gaelic footballer (Ballymaguigan, Newbridge, Derry senior team, Ulster). Born in Northern Ireland.
- 10 April
  - John Joe Walsh, 82, Gaelic footballer (St Laurence's, Kildare senior team) and selector (Kildare).
  - Pat Magner, 82, politician, Senator (1982–1982, 1983–1987 and 1993–1997).
- 12 April – Senan Louis O'Donnell, 96, Roman Catholic prelate, bishop of Maiduguri (1993–2003).
- 13 April – Craig Breen, 33, rally driver, car crash.
- 14 April – Mark Sheehan, 46, singer-songwriter, guitarist and producer.
- 18 April – Colm Murphy, 70, Irish republican and convicted arms trafficker (Omagh bombing), degenerative lung disease.
- 22 April
  - Mick Loftus, 93, Gaelic footballer (Mayo senior team), referee and GAA president.
  - Hugh Byrne, 83, politician, TD (1969–1982).
- 28 April – Johnny Fean, 71, guitarist (Horslips).

=== May ===
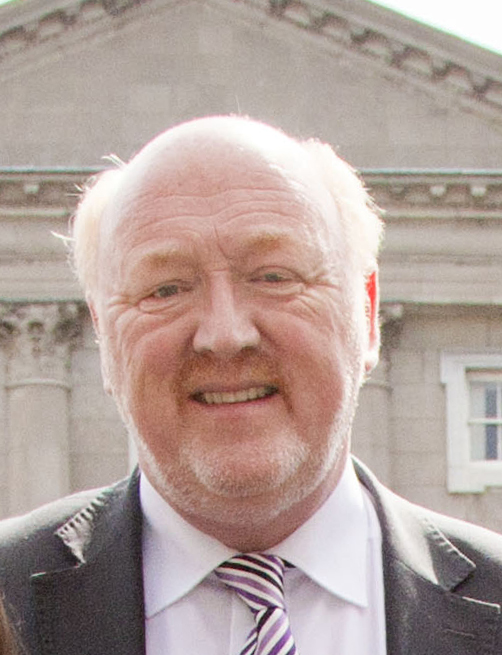
Derek Keating

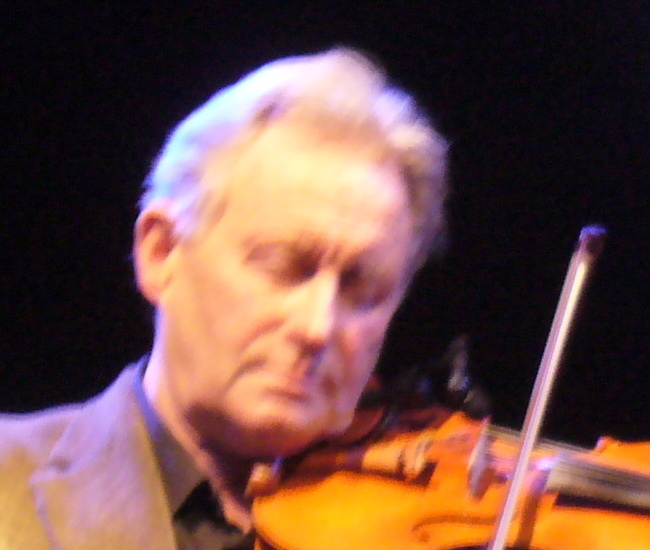
Seán Keane

- 1 May – Brendan Walsh, 50, hurler (Killeagh, Imokilly, Cork senior team).
- 6 May
  - Derek Keating, 67, politician, TD (2011–2016).
  - Joe Young, 89, Gaelic footballer and hurler (St. Vincent's, Dublin junior team, Galway senior teams).
- 7 May
  - Seán Keane, 76, fiddler. (The Chieftains).
  - Patrick Joseph McGrath, 77, Roman Catholic prelate, Bishop of San Jose, California (1999–2019).
- 15 May – Marty Lynch, 59, Gaelic footballer (Newry Mitchels, Newry Bosco, Down senior team). Born in Northern Ireland.
- 19 May – Seán McCormack, 79, Gaelic footballer (Kilmainhamwood, Meath senior team).
- 27 May
  - Hugh Callaghan, 93, a member of the Birmingham Six.
  - Graham Knuttel, 69, painter and sculptor.
- 30 May – Michael Viney, 90, artist, author, journalist and broadcaster.
- 31 May – Peter Harbison, 84, archaeologist.

=== June ===
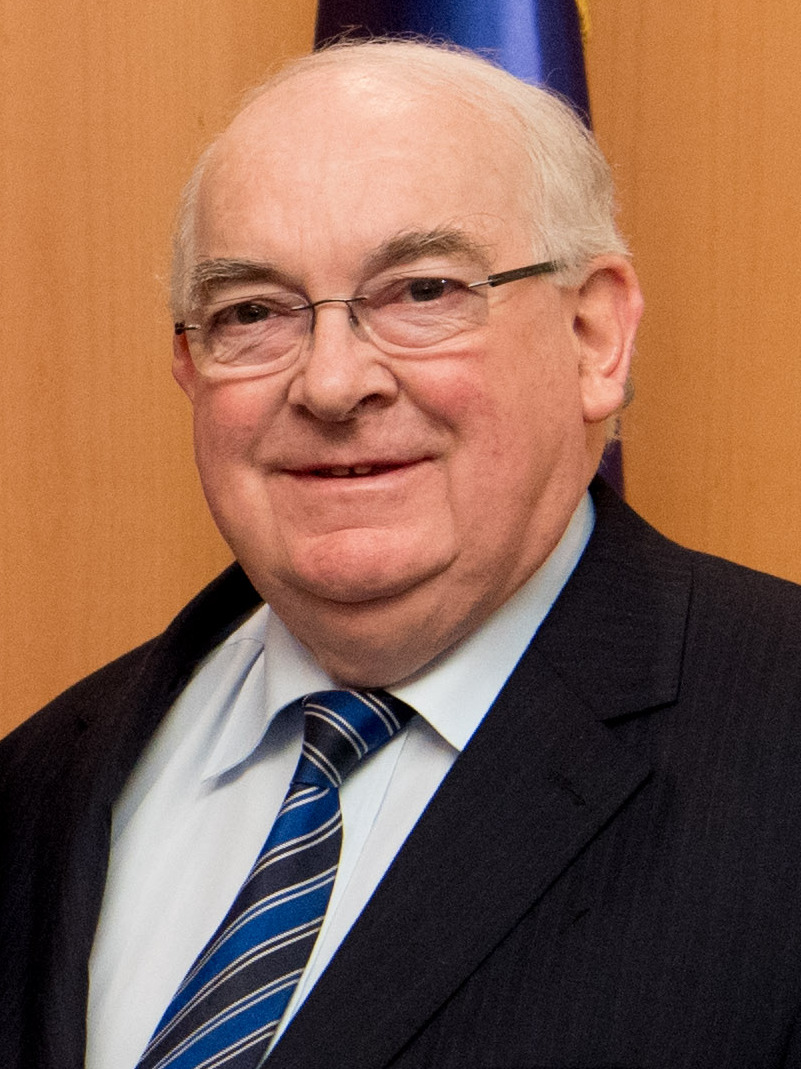
Paul Coghlan

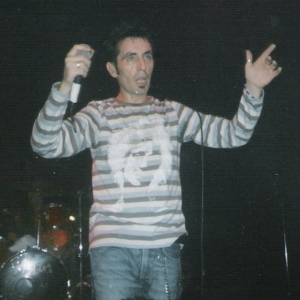
Christy Dignam

- 1 June – Roy Taylor, singer and bass player.
- 3 June – Conor O'Brien, 18th Baron Inchiquin, 79, peer. Born in England.
- 6 June – Teddy McCarthy, 57, hurler and Gaelic footballer (Sarsfields, Glanmire, Cork senior teams, Munster).
- 8 June – Paul Coghlan, 79, politician, Senator (1997–2020).
- 11 June – Michael A. Noonan, 82, television writer.
- 13 June – Christy Dignam, 63, singer (Aslan).
- 19 June – Jim McCourt, 79, boxer, Olympic bronze medallist (1964). Born in Northern Ireland.
- 21 June – Ronnie Nolan, 89, footballer (Shamrock Rovers, Bohermians, national team).
- 24 June – S. M. Cyril, 86, educator.
- 28 June – Willie Carrick, 70, footballer (Chelmsford City, Luton Town).

=== July ===
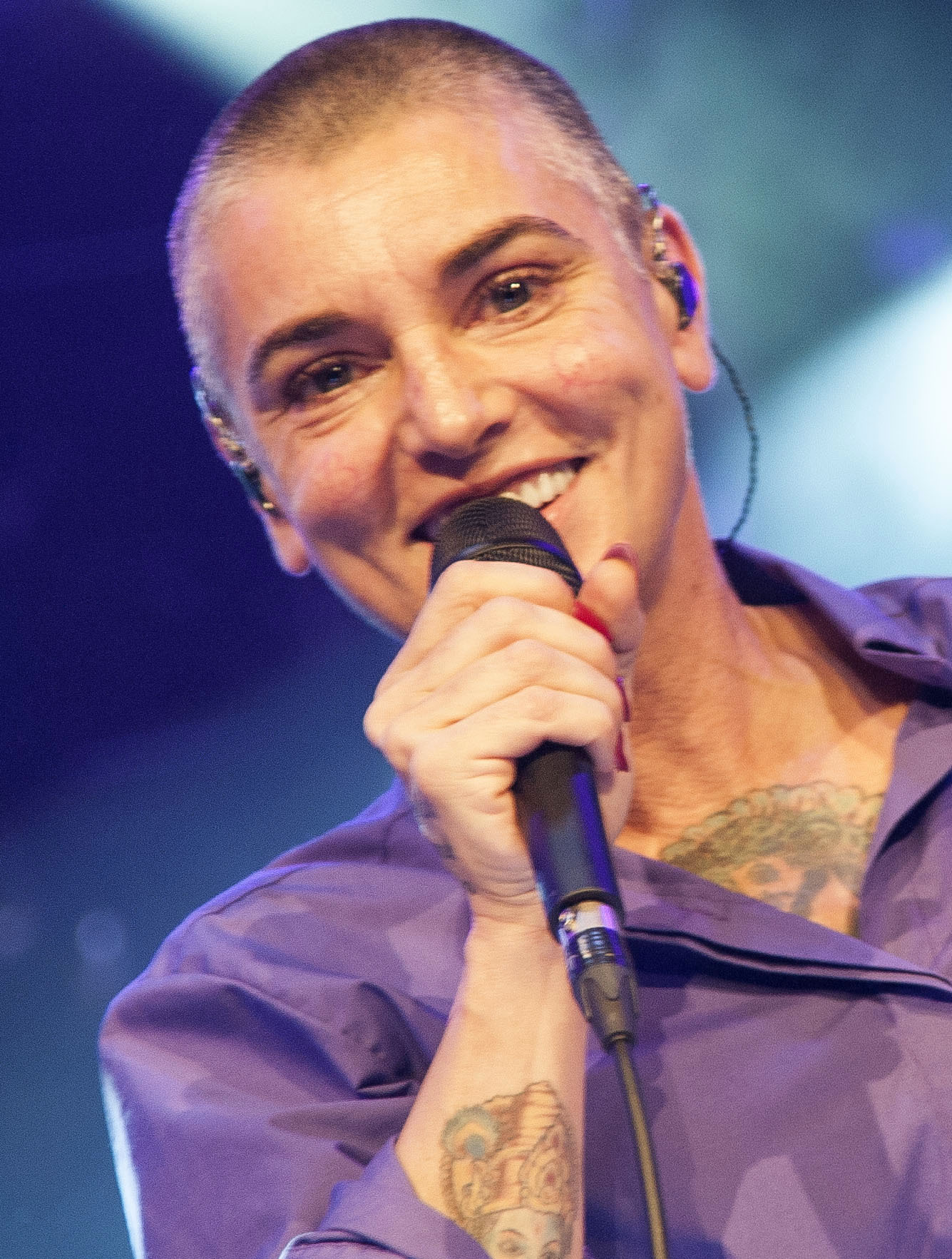
Sinéad O'Connor

- 1 July
  - Gerard Cott, 83, politician, TD (1969–1973).
  - John O'Grady, 83, hurling referee.
- 3 July – Greig Oliver, 58, rugby union coach (Munster, national under-20 team). Born in Scotland.
- 6 July
  - Brendan Daly, 83, politician, TD (1973–1992 and 1997–2002), Minister for the Marine (1987–1989), Minister for Social Welfare (1991–1992).
  - Roly Meates, 85, rugby union player (Dublin University Football Club, Wanderers) and coach (Leinster, national team).
- 10 July – Ben Briscoe, 89, politician, TD (1965–2002) and Lord Mayor of Dublin (1988–1989).
- 22 July – Bill Cashin, 85, politician, Senator (1993–1997).
- 26 July – Sinéad O'Connor, 56, singer-songwriter.
- 28 July – Flor O'Mahony, 77, politician, Senator (1981–1987) and MEP (1983–1984).
- 30 July – Frank Rodgers, 82, Gaelic footballer (Beragh Red Knights, Tyrone senior team) and administrator.
- 31 July – Jimmy Cooney, 68, hurler (Sarsfields, Galway senior team) and referee.

=== August ===
- 1 August
  - Tony Brien, 54, footballer (Leicester City, Chesterfield, Rotherham United, West Bromwich Albion, Mansfield Town, Chester City, Hull City).
  - John Madigan, 76, hurler (Charleville, Avondhu) and rugby union player (UL Bohemians, Munster).
- 4 August – Colin O'Daly, 70, chef.
- 9 August – Art McRory, 82, Gaelic footballer (Dungannon, Tyrone senior team) and manager (Tyrone minor and senior teams). Born in Northern Ireland.
- 15 August – Liam McDaid, 78, Roman Catholic prelate.
- 23 August – Chryss Goulandris, 73, businesswoman, horse breeder and wife of Tony O'Reilly. Born in the United States.

=== September ===
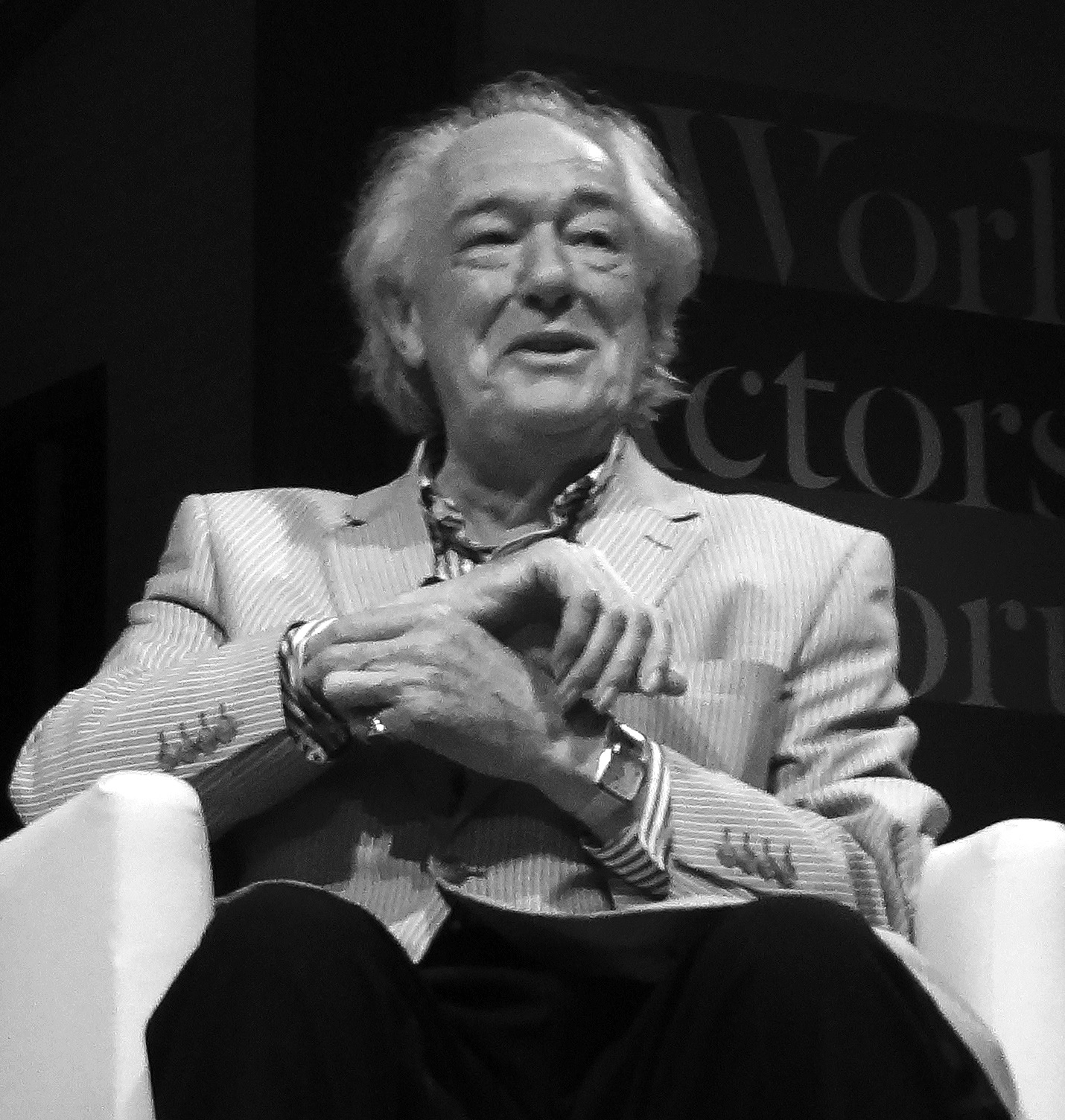
Michael Gambon

- 4 September – Mick Molloy, 85, Olympic long-distance runner (1968).
- 6 September – Dermot Keogh, 78, historian and author.
- 8 September – John Kelly, 78, hurler (Cappawhite, Kilruane MacDonaghs, Tipperary senior team, Munster).
- 19 September
  - Jimmy Brohan, 88, hurler (Blackrock, Cork senior team, Munster).
  - Brendan Devlin, 92, academic.
  - Rónán Mac Aodha Bhuí, 53, broadcaster.
- 28 September – Michael Gambon, 82, Irish-English actor (Harry Potter, Gosford Park, The King's Speech), pneumonia.

=== October ===
- 9 October
  - Críostóir Ó Floinn, 95, writer.
  - Hugh Friel, 71, drummer (The Atrix).
- 10 October – Dónal O'Neill, 56, Gaelic footballer (Edenderry, Offaly senior team).
- 13 October – Hugh Russell, 63, boxer, Olympic bronze medallist (1980).
- 15 October – Gerry Ryan, 68, footballer (Bohemians, Derby County, Brighton, national team).
- 17 October – Paul Reynolds, 50, cricket umpire.
- 29 October – Jimmy Duggan, 93, hurler (Liam Mellows, Galway senior team, Connacht).
- 31 October – Séamus Leydon, 81, Gaelic footballer (Dunmore MacHales, Nemo Rangers, Galway senior team, Connacht).

=== November ===
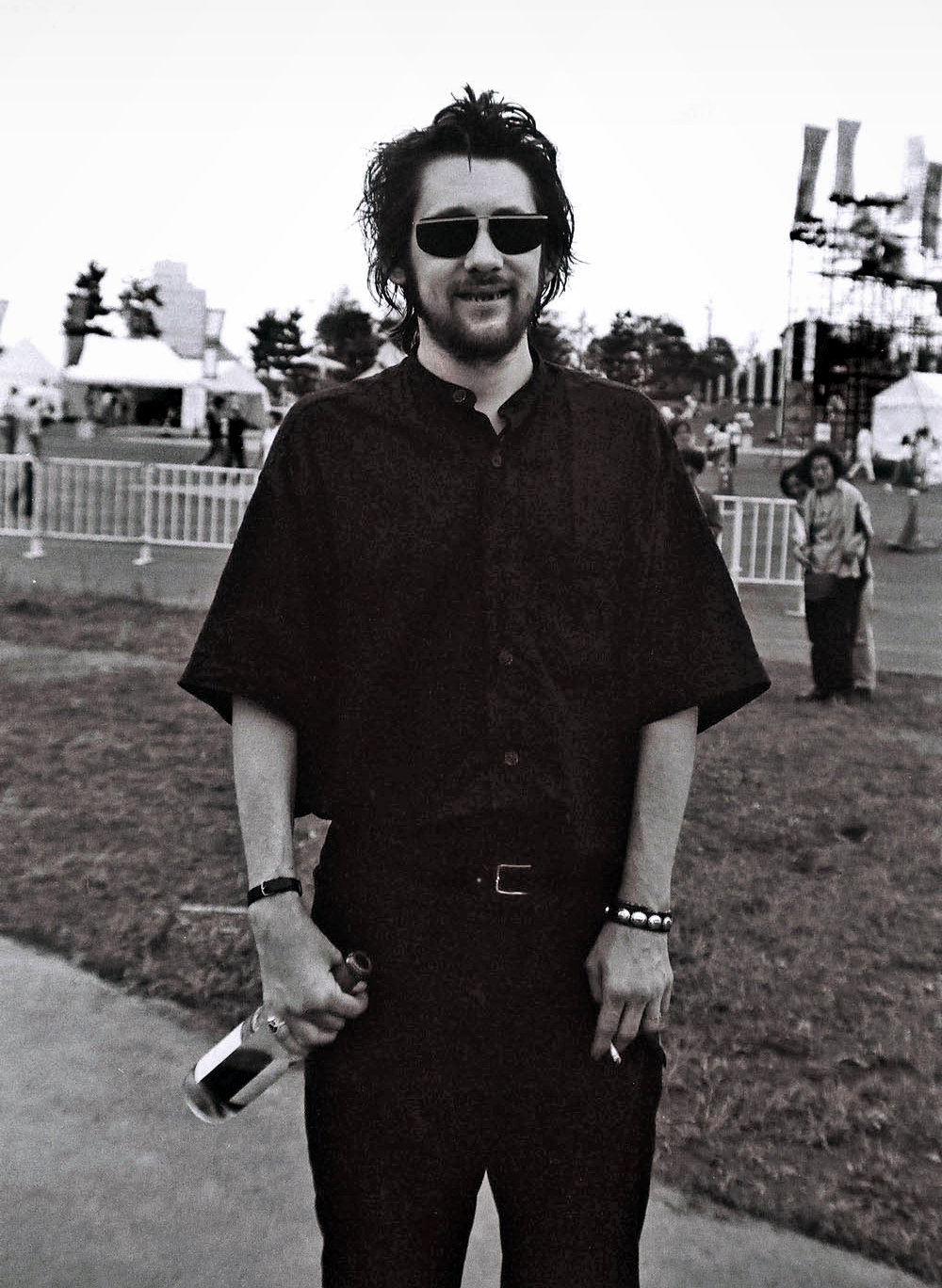
Shane MacGowan

- 5 November – Ross McDonnell, 44, director, cinematographer and photographer.
- 7 November – Dean Byrne, 39, professional boxer.
- 10 November – Miah Dennehy, 73, footballer (Walsall, Bristol Rovers, national team).
- 11 November – Louis Belton, 79, politician, TD (1989–1992 and 1997–2002) and Senator (1993–1997).
- 12 November – Anna Scher, 78, British-Irish drama school founder.
- 17 November – Seóirse Bodley, 90, composer.
- 18 November
  - Ben Dunne, 74, businessman.
  - Anthony Farquhar, 83, Roman Catholic prelate, Auxiliary Bishop of Down and Connor (1983–2015).
- 19 November – Eddie Linden, 88, poet and editor. Born in Scotland.
- 20 November – Frankie Connolly, 78, footballer (Cork Hibernians, Cork Alberts).
- 26 November – Tras Honan, 93, politician, Senator (1977–1992) and Cathaoirleach (1982–1983 and 1987–1989).
- 30 November – Shane MacGowan, 65, singer-songwriter (The Pogues). Born in England.

=== December ===
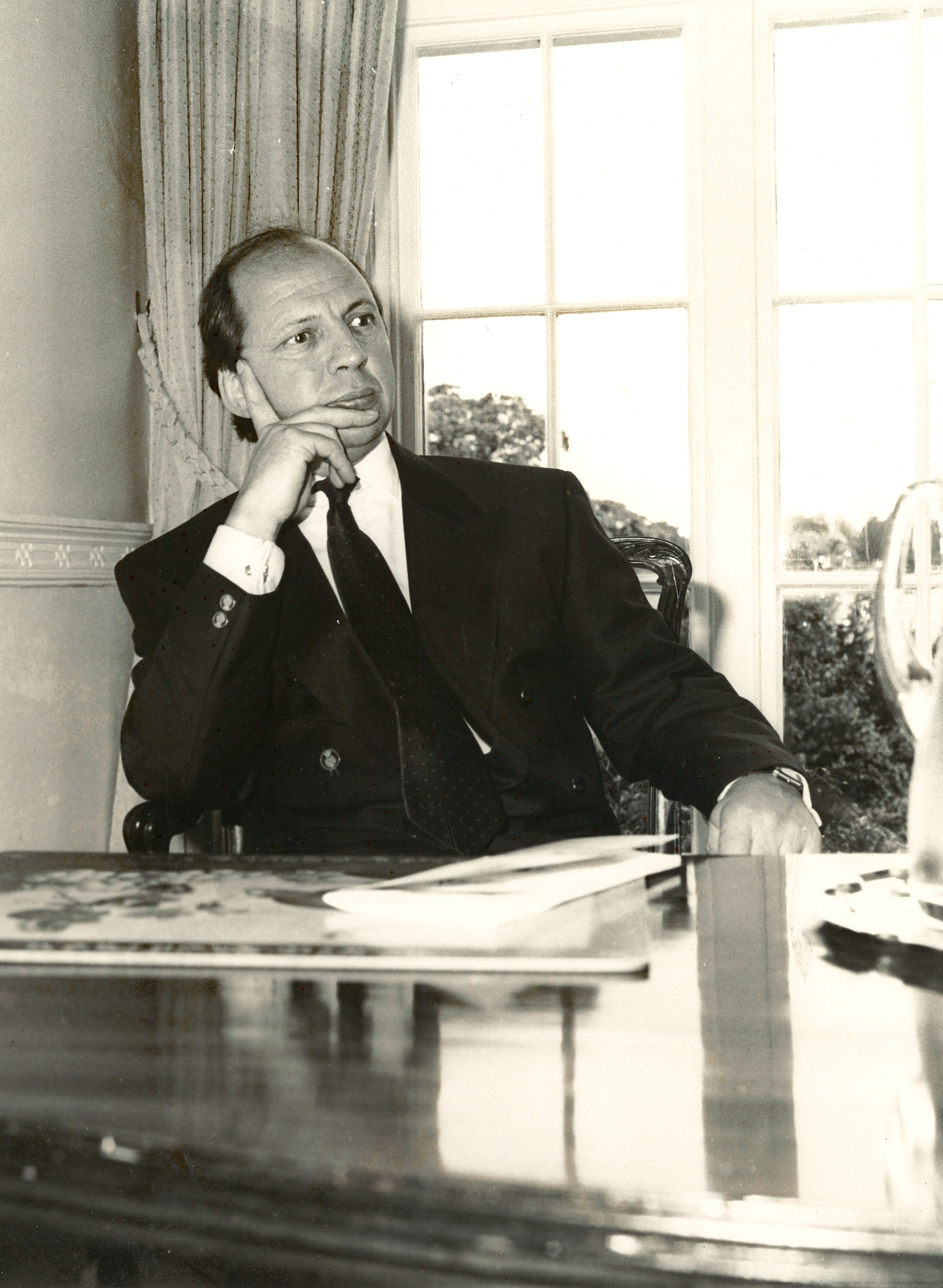
Jonathan Irwin

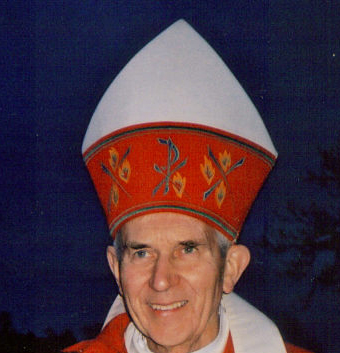
Patrick Walsh

- 2 December – Neville Callaghan, 77, racehorse trainer.
- 5 December – Rosemary Smith, 86, rally driver.
- 7 December – Thomas Kilroy, 89, playwright and novelist.
- 10 December
  - Jonathan Irwin, 82, blood stock agent, auctioneer, stud owner, publisher and founder of the Jack and Jill Foundation.
  - Syd Millar, 89, rugby union player (Ballymena, national team), coach (British & Irish Lions) and International Rugby Board chairman (2003–2007). Born in Northern Ireland.
  - Bill McCarthy, 87, hurler (St Brendan's, Ardfert, Kerry junior team, Munster).
- 11 December – Frank Twomey, 68, children's television entertainer and comedian (Bosco, Bull Island).
- 16 December – Joseph Finnegan, 81, judge.
- 17 December – Maureen Flavin Sweeney, 100, postmistress and formerly a weather forecaster notable for advising on the D-Day landings.
- 20 December – Johnny Flaherty, 76, hurler (Kinnitty, Offaly senior team, Leinster).
- 21 December – Martin Feeley, 73, Olympic rower (1976) and surgeon.
- 27 December – Éamonn Draper, 83, actor and director.
- 28 December – Patrick Walsh, 92, Roman Catholic prelate, bishop of Down and Connor (1991–2008).
- 30 December – Paddy Murphy, 89, Gaelic footballer (Dromtarriffe, Duhallow, Cork senior team.
