= 2023 Booker Prize =

British literary award given in 2023

- Date: 26 November 2023
- Location: Old Billingsgate, London
- Country: United Kingdom & Ireland

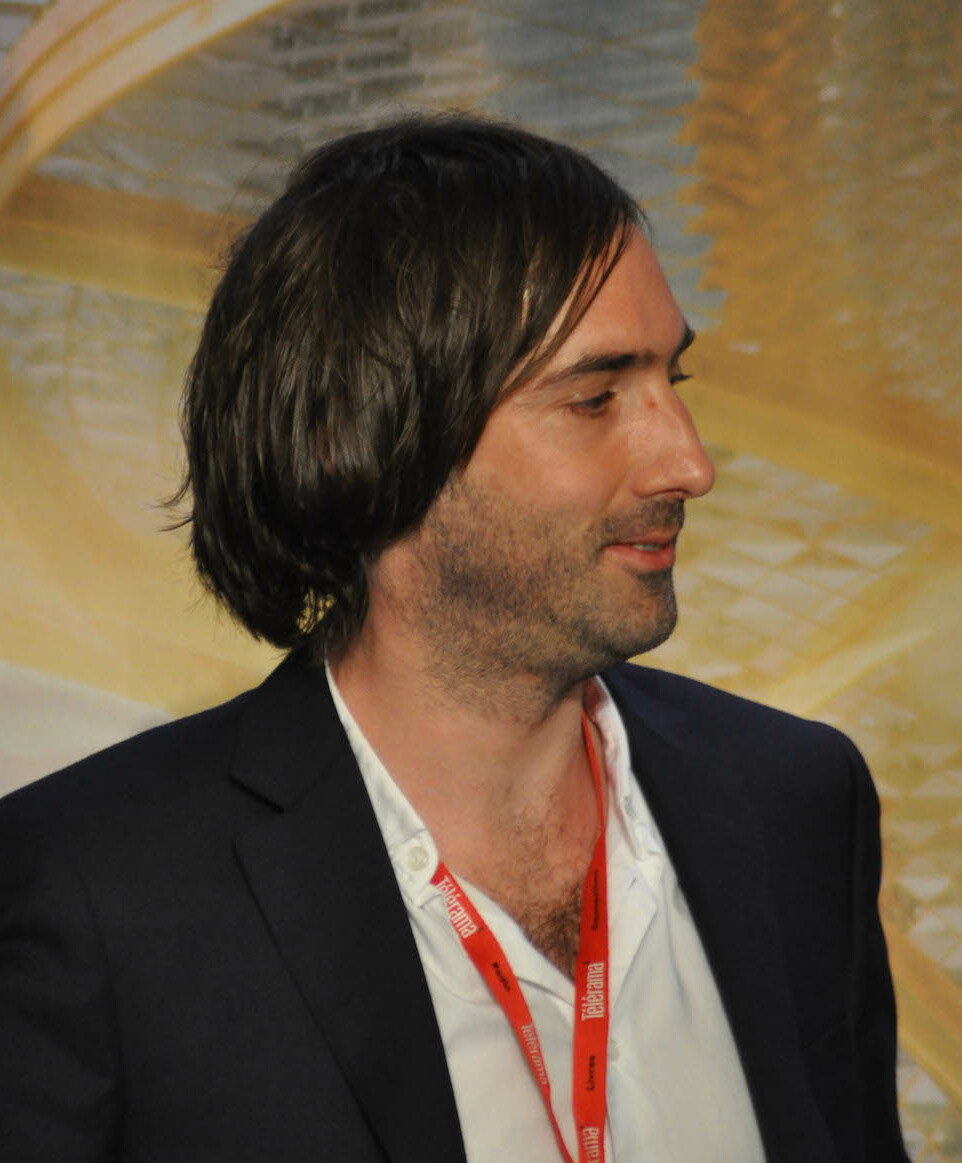
Paul Lynch, winner of the 2023 Booker Prize

The Booker Prize is an annual literary award given for the best English-language novel of the year published in either the United Kingdom or Ireland. The 2023 winner was Paul Lynch's Prophet Song.

The 2023 longlist was announced on 1 August. The shortlist, announced on 21 September, consisted of six books from six different authors, one British, one Canadian, two Irish, and two American. For all six authors, this marked the first time that they had appeared in a Booker Prize shortlist. For two writers, Escoffery and Maroo, the shortlist honour was given for their debut novels. With the 2023 longlisting for her work All the Little Bird-Hearts, Viktoria Lloyd-Barlow became the first person with autism to be nominated for a Booker prize. Regarding the 2023 shortlisted works, novelist and chair of the Booker Prize Judging Panel, Esi Edugyan stated "This year's novels offer a full range of lived experience, the books refuse easy categorization. No one voice, no one vision dominates."

The winner was announced on 26 November 2023, at the Old Billingsgate in London. The £50,000 prize was won by Paul Lynch of Ireland for his novel Prophet Song. Esi Edugyan stated that the work was a "triumph of emotional storytelling, bracing and brave". Edugyan also stated that the book's depiction of war and the migrant crisis "captures the social and political anxieties of our current moment."

The keynote speaker for the award ceremony was Nazanin Zaghari-Ratcliffe, who was detained in an Iranian prison for about six years and released in March 2022. Zaghari-Ratcliffe explained how books that were smuggled to her had helped her during her time in solitary confinement.

== Judging panel ==
- Esi Edugyan (chair)
- Adjoa Andoh
- Robert Webb
- James Shapiro
- Mary Jean Chan

== Nominees ==
All 2023 nominees are novels.

indicates the winner
indicates shortlisted

Author	Title	Country	Publisher
Ayọ̀bámi Adébáyọ̀	A Spell of Good Things	Nigeria/England	Canongate
Sebastian Barry	Old God's Time	Ireland	Faber & Faber
Sarah Bernstein	Study for Obedience	Canada	Granta Books
Tan Twan Eng	The House of Doors	Malaysia	Canongate
Jonathan Escoffery	If I Survive You	USA	4th Estate
Elaine Feeney	How to Build a Boat	Ireland	Harvill Secker
Paul Harding	This Other Eden	USA	Hutchinson Heinemann
Siân Hughes	Pearl	England	Indigo Press
Viktoria Lloyd-Barlow	All the Little Bird-Hearts	England	Tinder Press
Paul Lynch	Prophet Song	Ireland	Oneworld Publications
Martin MacInnes	In Ascension	Scotland	Atlantic Books
Chetna Maroo	Western Lane	Kenya/England	Picador
Paul Murray	The Bee Sting	Ireland	Hamish Hamilton

== See also ==
- List of winners and nominated authors of the Booker Prize
