= Prophet Song =

2023 novel by Paul Lynch

- Author: Paul Lynch
- Language: English
- Publisher: Oneworld Publications
- Publication date: 2023
- Publication place: Ireland
- Pages: 320
- Awards: Booker Prize
- ISBN: 9780861546459

Prophet Song is a 2023 dystopian novel by Irish author Paul Lynch, published by Oneworld. The novel depicts the struggles of the Stack family, in particular Eilish Stack, a mother of four who is trying to save her family as the Republic of Ireland slips into totalitarianism. The narrative is told unconventionally, with run-on sentences, no paragraph breaks and dialogue without quotation marks.

The book won the 2023 Booker Prize. It was Ireland’s bestselling book—including fiction and nonfiction— of 2023.

== Background ==
Lynch stated that one of the main inspirations for the book was Syrian Civil War, the ensuing refugee crisis, and the West's indifference to the plight of refugees. Lynch has also cited the German author Hermann Hesse's work as an inspiration to write his first dystopian novel. (Note: Although book reviewers consistently refer to the novel as dystopian, Lynch himself is not so sure: “I don’t think the book fits in the category of dystopia because a fiction where the events in the book are happening somewhere else in the world right now, ceases to be speculative.”)

== Synopsis ==
In the near future, the far-right National Alliance Party seizes control of the Republic of Ireland, putting into place emergency powers that suspend the Irish constitution, giving the Garda Síochána far-reaching powers and establishing a new secret police force, the Garda National Services Bureau (GNSB). Larry Stack, a teacher and trade union leader living in Dublin, is arrested and held without charge while attending a protest against the new regime. Soon after, he loses all contact with his family: Eilish, his wife; Mark, their eldest son; their only daughter, Molly; thirteen-year-old Bailey; and their infant son, Ben. Eilish initially tries to petition to have her husband freed, but it soon becomes apparent that Larry has been disappeared.

Eilish, however, refuses to believe this, insists that the regime will not hold power for long, and will be removed through international outrage and economic sanctions, as revealed in foreign news. Eilish is forced to care for her father, Simon, who has dementia, with occasional episodes of lucidity in which he pleads with her to leave the country. She refuses, insisting that the situation will improve and Larry will return. Simon eventually leaves for Canada to live with Eilish's sister, Áine.

Mark is called up for military service. He refuses, going into hiding, before deciding he will join a rapidly growing rebel force comprising defected soldiers and civilian volunteers. He soon loses touch with his mother. The fighting advances, and the rebels capture Dublin, but shortly after, the regime government begins bombing the city to flush the rebels out.

In one such attack, Bailey is injured with shrapnel in his skull. Eilish takes him to a hospital with much difficulty, but is forced to leave him overnight. When she returns the next day, she finds her son is not there, and is told he has been sent to a military hospital. She travels to the military hospital, but after several attempts to locate her son, is eventually told by a cleaner to check the morgue. There she finds her young son's corpse, disfigured and showing signs of torture.

Wracked with grief, Eilish and her remaining two children join an exodus of people trying to escape the fighting into Northern Ireland, using money given to them by Áine. The novel ends ambiguously, with Eilish standing on the beach with her two children, about to climb into a refugee boat, telling her daughter "To the sea, we must go to the sea, the sea is life."

== Reception ==
Aimée Walsh of The Observer stated that the novel's style lent it a "breathless, claustrophobic atmosphere", with Walsh concluding that "Lynch's message is crystal clear: lives the world over are experiencing upheaval, violence, persecution. Prophet Song is a literary manifesto for empathy for those in need and a brilliant, haunting novel that should be placed into the hands of policymakers everywhere."

Writing for the Financial Times, Lucy Popescu stated that the lack of paragraph breaks gave the novel a sense of urgency. She stated that the novel gave a new perspective and empathy to those suffering in the migrant crisis, stating: "Lynch describes the unremitting horrors of war, but his fiction also directly challenges the negative rhetoric surrounding refugees by articulating and illuminating their trauma."

Reviewing the novel for The Guardian, Melissa Harrison lauded Lynch's depiction of the main character, stating: "Lynch's depiction of Eilish is nuanced and sympathetic, and in the fiercely embodied quality of her love for her children, entirely successful." Harrison further stated that "the manner in which civil society breaks apart is lingeringly and brutally drawn", with the narrative having insightful parallels to similar crises in recent history.

Not all reviews were positive, however, with The Daily Telegraph's Cal Revely-Calder describing Prophet Song as "the weak link in a strong shortlist – and the real winner [Sarah Bernstein's Study for Obedience] was overlooked". Writing for The New York Times, author Benjamin Markovits explained that, because the political crisis that led to the descent into chaos is never explained, it is hard to sympathize with the Irish citizens who aligned with the National Alliance Party, with Markovits stating: "But without some moral ambiguity, there's a danger that a novel like this can turn into an instance of preaching to the choir: We know who the baddies are, and it's not us. We're not complicit in whatever has gone wrong in this society."

Regarding the novel's prose, Markovits stated that, although the novel contains "many, many lines and passages of great beauty and power", there were also instances when "Lynch doesn't quite trust the situation he has put his characters in to carry the emotional weight, and the metaphors start to get in the way."

=== Booker Prize ===
The novel won the 2023 Booker Prize. The chair of the judging panel, Esi Edugyan, stated that the work was a "triumph of emotional storytelling, bracing and brave". Regarding the novel's depiction of war and the subsequent migrant crisis, Edugyan stated that the book "captures the social and political anxieties of our current moment."

Lynch is the sixth Irish writer to win a Booker Prize.
