= Atrix =

Atrix may refer to:

- Atrix (game), a South Korea online action game
- Motorola Atrix 4G, a smartphone made by Motorola
- The Atrix (band), an Irish new wave/powerpop band
