= Siân Hughes =

UK poet and novelist

Siân Hughes (born 24 September 1965) is a poet and novelist from the United Kingdom.

== Biography ==
Hughes grew up in a small village in Cheshire, which served as the setting of her first novel Pearl.

Siân Hughes began writing poetry on an Arvon course in 1994, and in 1996 won the TLS/Poems on the Underground competition with "Secret Lives". In 2006, she won first prize in the Arvon International Poetry Competition with "The Send-Off", an elegy for her third child. In 2009, her collection of poetry, The Missing, was longlisted for the Guardian First Book Award shortlisted for the Felix Dennis and Aldeburgh prizes for best first poetry collection, and won the First Collection Poetry Prize from the Seamus Heaney Centre.

In 2023, her debut novel Pearl was longlisted for the 2023 Booker Prize. Pearl is a retelling of the Pearl Poet's 14th century poem Pearl about a father struggling with the death of his daughter. The novel Pearl tells the grief experienced by a young mother Marianne as she loses her own mother, making her recollect an earlier loss in her life. Writing for The Guardian, Barney Norris commended Hughes for portraying the permanence of grief: "The way trauma cuts one off from the world and isolates the sufferer in the moment that hurt them is brilliantly rendered here."

Siân Hughes lives in Cheshire with her son, where she owns and runs the independent bookshop Magpie Books.

== Works ==
- The Missing, Salt Publishing, 2009. ISBN 9781844714988.
- Pearl, Penguin Random House, 2023. ISBN 9780593802564.
- No Such Thing As Monday, Henry Holt and Company, 2026. ISBN 9781250459572.
