= Martin MacInnes =

Scottish writer (born 1983)

- Born: 1983 (age 42–43); Scotland
- Occupation: Author
- Writing career
- Period: 2016–present
- Genres: Science fiction; experimental fiction
- Notable works: Infinite Ground; Gathering Evidence; In Ascension
- Notable awards: Scottish Book Trust New Writers Award 2014; Manchester Fiction Prize 2014; Somerset Maugham Award 2017 Infinite Ground; Blackwell's Book of the Year 2023, In Ascension; Saltire Award for Fiction 2023, In Ascension
- Website: martinmacinnes.com

Martin MacInnes (born 1983) is a Scottish author of three novels including Infinite Ground (2016), which won the Somerset Maugham Award, and In Ascension (2023). His work often delves into themes of the human condition in the 21st century, weaving narratives that reflect on the tensions between digital advancement and ecological devastation. MacInnes's work is known for its blend of science fiction and everyday life, earning him the label of "the best experimentalist now working" from The Times.

== Career ==
MacInnes was born in 1983. His short story "Our Disorder" won the Manchester Fiction Prize. His debut novel, Infinite Ground, won the Somerset Maugham Award.

His second novel, Gathering Evidence, was published in 2020. The novel is recognized as an "exquisitely crafted and unsettling story" presenting a prescient vision of the risks of ecological catastrophe, technological dependence, and social isolation.

Macinnes was a Royal Literary Fund fellow at the University of Dundee from 2020 to 2022. His third novel, In Ascension, was published in 2023, and has been called "a far-reaching epic that blends a deep scientific knowledge with a wide-eyed wonder at our place in the universe." It was longlisted for the Booker Prize and won the 2023 Blackwell's Book of the Year and the Saltire Fiction Book of the Year. In 2024, In Ascension was the winner of the Arthur C Clarke award.

== Books ==
- Infinite Ground (Atlantic, 2016)
- Gathering Evidence (Atlantic, 2020)
- In Ascension (Atlantic, 2023)
- The Fields (Atlantic, 2027)
