= Viktoria Lloyd-Barlow =

British author of fiction

Viktoria Lloyd-Barlow is a British writer whose debut novel, All the Little Bird-Hearts, was longlisted for the 2023 Booker Prize. Her work is informed by her background as an autistic woman and activities supporting people with autism; her writing is noted for its introspective tone and lyrical style.

== Biography ==
Lloyd-Barlow obtained her PhD in creative writing from the University of Kent, with Amy Sackville serving as her doctoral adviser. Lloyd-Barlow's debut novel, All the Little Bird-Hearts, was developed as a result of her PhD studies.

The novel tells of a friendship that develops between Sunday, an autistic woman living in a Lake District home, and her newly arrived eccentric neighbor Vita, who emigrated from London with her husband Rollo. The friendship between the two women eventually sours as Sunday's daughter Dolly begins to favor the relationship with Vita while neglecting her mother.

James Smart, writing for The Guardian, described the work as a "tightly focused story, set almost entirely in two neighbouring houses on a quiet street, that's also a gleeful skewering of social codes, a raw portrait of family life and a revealing account of neurodivergence."

She became the first autistic author to be nominated for a Booker Prize with the novel's longlisting in 2023.

== Awards ==
The Booker Prize judging panel stated All the Little Bird-Hearts was a "lyrical and poignant debut novel [that] offers a deft exploration of motherhood, vulnerability and the complexity of human relationships." The novel was awarded the 2024 Authors' Club Best First Novel Award for the most promising debut novel by a UK or Irish based author that is initially published in the UK. Guest judge Samira Ahmed selected the winning work from a shortlist curated by Authors' Club members, with a ceremony being held in May 2024 at the National Liberal Club in London.

== Bibliography ==
- All the Little Bird-Hearts, Hachette Book Group, 2023. ISBN 9781472288004.
