= If I Survive You =

2022 book by Jonathan Escoffery

- First edition cover
- Author: Jonathan Escoffery
- Language: English
- Genre: Literary fiction, historical fiction
- Publisher: MCD Books
- Publication date: September 6, 2022
- Publication place: United States
- Pages: 272
- ISBN: 978-0-374-60598-8
- OCLC: 1289250366

If I Survive You is the debut book by Jonathan Escoffery, published on September 6, 2022, by MCD Books. It is a collection of eight interlinked short stories that follow the struggles of an immigrant family from Jamaica who build a new home in Miami. The story's main character is Trelawny, an American-born son of immigrants who grapples with identity, familial and cultural issues through various phases of adolescence and adulthood.

The book was released to wide acclaim, with reviewers praising Escoffery's narrative style, technical skill, and use of humor. It was shortlisted for the 2023 Booker Prize, and was a finalist or longlisted for several other awards.

== Plot ==
The story follows a Jamaican immigrant family that moves to Miami in the 1970s. It is told through eight connected short stories.

The main character is Trelawny, the young son of Topper and Sanya; they moved to Miami in the 1970s in search of stability after political violence erupted in their hometown of Kingston, Jamaica. The parents struggle to build a home and find meaning in their new circumstances, faced with long-standing systemic inequities in America, and a feeling of living outside the mainstream. They deal with the havoc of Hurricane Andrew, economic uncertainty and a disconnect from their two sons, Trelawny and Delano, both who face their own struggles with identity. Much of the book is delivered from Trelawny's perspective, with stories following his coming of age, his turbulent relationship with his father, as well as his struggle to belong in any one place and with any one community.

Growing up, Trelawny does not feel accepted by his family or with peers, caught between the cultural pressures imposed by his family and the draw of fitting in with American ideals. His identity and allegiances are regularly questioned because, as the book depicts, these are typically determined around racial lines in America. Trelawny feels pressure to live up to his Jamaican roots at times while being drawn by America's promises of opportunity and individualism. Trelawny perceives his brother Delano, as preferred by his father. This is especially true following a rift between his parents that leads to their separation, and him living with his mother, while his father agrees to custody of Delano.

Nonetheless, Trelawny survives the pains of adolescence and decides to pursue college in the Midwest. Here, he faces an alternate view of his race. He is decidedly perceived as Black in the predominantly white Midwestern college he chooses. Any ambiguity around his race which he faced in Miami, a city of many backgrounds, ethnicities, and cultures is gone. At first, he takes comfort in this different space, but begins to miss Miami and moves back with hopes of building a life. Jobless, he seeks help from his father. But after a violent fight between them, he finds himself homeless. He begins to take on odd gigs, answering off-beat Craigslist ads, and eventually landing himself a job at a building management office of a Miami Beach apartment complex. His main responsibility becomes badgering financially distressed tenants to pay rent.

Meanwhile, his brother Delano's luck deteriorates. The contracting business he runs goes under and his wife takes his two sons and leaves for another state. Trelawny eventually moves in with his brother to their childhood home, which Delano rents from their father. Their relationship remains competitive and tense, leading to a battle to buy their father's house. Underlying every struggle in the book is a will to survive, and, ultimately, hope.

== Release ==
If I Survive You was published by MCD Books in hardback and paperback; both were 272 pages long. Variously described as being a novel, short-story collection, or even autobiographical, it was released to the public on September 6, 2022. Macmillan Audio simultaneously released an audiobook edition produced by Farrar, Straus and Giroux and narrated by Torian Brackett. Its quality was commended by AudioFile Magazine, which gave it their Earphones Award.

== Reception ==
=== Reviews ===
If I Survive You was released to wide acclaim. In a universally positive review, Katy Waldman at The New Yorker said that Escoffery's "fiction is marked by ingenuity [...] The book feels thrillingly free". Waldman called out Escoffery's adept sense of humor, often expressed in what she called the "comedy of infighting", and applauded his portrayal of "the disorienting effects of race as they fall". NPR's Maureen Corrigan felt that the ending of one of the short stories, "Splashdown", and its sink or swim spirit favorably compared to the classic novel Moby-Dick. She also highlighted Escoffery's writing about the effects of race in the United States, whether due to explicit racism, the effects of the Great Recession, or in the aftermath of Hurricane Andrew.

Michael Ferry at BookTrib lauded Escoffery's technical skill, noting that his perspective shifts between first, second, and third person, along with his tense shifts between past, present, and future, could have been distracting if done by a "less-skilled writer". Instead, Ferry continued, "Escoffery uses each transition with purpose. The reader is given a multitude of angles and distances from which to view each character and their environment. A strong connection is created with the subject, conflict and emotion become more intense, and the setting gains additional layers of texture." The Guardian's reviewer Ian Williams wrote out similar sentiments, and added praise for the unusual use of second person, which they thought cemented the "estrangement Trelawny feels from himself" and for the sense of empathy it fostered between the reader and main character. Williams additionally highlighted Escoffery's "interracial sensitivity", writing that his "courage to move beyond the politeness that silences meaningful conversations on race" brought on moments where Williams "wanted to snap my fingers, like at a poetry slam."

In a measured article for The New York Times Book Review, Andrew Martin also applauded Escoffery's "disarming" and "irreverent" humor, along with his ability to make him empathize with the main characters. However, Martin critiqued Escoffery's pacing, saying that he "wished at times that I was caught more forcefully in a current of narrative momentum with them", and added that parts of the book felt "less than convincing".

In a starred review, Kirkus succinctly called If I Survive You "a fine debut that looks at the complexities of cultural identity with humor, savvy, and a rich sense of place." The Financial Times' Suzi Feay wrote that If I Survive You was "jaunty, irrepressible and full of energy even in moments of horror. A fine achievement."

=== Awards and honors ===
Time and The New York Times Book Review included If I Survive You in their 100 top books of 2022. Booklist listed it as a 2022 "Booklist Editors' Choice" for adult books, as well as their 2023 list of the best historical fiction books by debut authors.

If I Survive You was one of six shortlisted for the 2023 Booker Prize, having made the cut from a thirteen-strong longlist. Escoffery made the short list alongside another author's debut novel, Chetna Maroo's Western Lane.

The Booker Prize judges called If I Survive You "an astonishingly assured debut novel, lauded by the panel for its clarity, variety and fizzing prose. As the stories move back and forth through geography and time, we are confronted by the immigrants' eternal questions: who am I now and where do I belong?"

Awards for If I Survive You
Year	Award	Category	Result	Ref.
2022	National Book Award	Fiction	Longlisted	
2022	National Book Critics Circle Award	John Leonard Prize	Shortlisted	
2023	Aspen Words Literary Prize	—	Longlisted	
2023	Booker Prize	—	Shortlisted	
2023	Gordon Burn Prize	—	Shortlisted	
2023	PEN/Faulkner Award for Fiction	—	Shortlisted	
2023	Southern Book Prize	—	Shortlisted	
2024	International Dublin Literary Award	—	Shortlisted	
