= In Ascension =

2023 book by Martin MacInnes

- Cover of 1st edition
- Author: Martin MacInnes
- Language: English
- Genre: Science fiction
- Publisher: Atlantic Books; Grove Atlantic
- Publication date: 2023
- Publication place: England
- Media type: Print (Hardcover)
- Pages: 496 (first edition)
- ISBN: 978-1-83895-624-0
- LC Class: PR6113.A2628 I53 2023
- Website: https://atlantic-books.co.uk/book/in-ascension/

In Ascension is a 2023 science fiction novel by British writer Martin MacInnes, published in the UK by Atlantic Books and in the US by Grove Atlantic. It is published or forthcoming in ten languages.

The book was longlisted for the 2023 Booker Prize. It was the winner of Blackwell's 2023 Book of the Year, the Saltire Fiction Book of the Year, and the 2024 Arthur C. Clarke Award.

== Premise ==
Leigh grows up in the Netherlands amid the specter of climate change and eventually becomes a marine scientist exploring ocean trenches and investigating an anomaly at the edge of the Solar System.

== Plot ==
Leigh Hasenbosch grows up in a near-future version of Rotterdam - a city which has built an elaborate network of dikes, dams and other barriers to hold back rising sea levels. Leigh is physically abused by her father, a hydraulic engineer for the regional water board. She resents her passive mother Fenna, who works as a mathematician. As a child, Leigh finds an escape in water, including the man-made beach in Rotterdam and the Nieuwe Maas river.

As an adult, Leigh has studied marine ecology and microbiology before attending the Max Planck Institute for graduate school. She takes part in a research trip to investigate a newly discovered thermal vent, which appears to be significantly deeper than the Mariana Trench. To explore it, the team deploy a remotely operated underwater vehicle developed by NASA; however, connection is lost with the vehicle and the contents of the trench remain mysterious. After volunteering to dive into the trench, Leigh and the other divers experience a strange pull to return to its depths. Leigh believes this is related to archaea, the earliest forms of life, which remain preserved deep in the trench's water.

A breakthrough in space propulsion allows humans to travel much faster and further into space. Leigh takes a job with a mysterious space company, who are interested in Leigh's work developing an algae-based food source. Despite her sister urging her to spend time with her declining mother, Leigh throws herself more deeply into work. She discovers that the food source will be used for a space mission to investigate Datura, an anomalous object which may bear an extraterrestrial message. However, Datura suddenly disappears without trace. Voyager 1, a space probe which was thought to be no longer operational, transmits a strange message which may be influenced by Datura. The mission is reconfigured to intercept Voyager 1.

Believing she is unlikely to actually go to space, Leigh agrees to be part of the third backup space crew. However, ecological groups are concerned by the damaging effects of the new power, and succeed in attacking the first crews. Leigh travels into the Oort cloud, but her crew suffer from various unpredictable psychological and physical ailments, made worse by the delays in communicating with Earth. Abruptly, the crew lose all connection with Earth and their technological systems beyond the purely functional. Noticing that the constellations look different, the crew theorise they have been displaced in time, and wonder if the same thing happened to Datura. Having lost their navigation, they expect to travel further into space indefinitely.

Leigh's younger sister travels to Ascension Island, where Leigh was supposed to be rehabilitated after re-entry to Earth, looking for answers about what happened to Leigh. In the last section of the book, Leigh describes the spacecraft returning to Earth, which is entirely water with no land masses. As the only survivor of re-entry, Leigh muses on the cyclical nature of life beginning and ending with water.

== Reception ==
In a review for The Guardian, Adam Roberts stated: "The whole novel is beautifully written: richly atmospheric, full of brilliantly evoked detail, never sacrificing the grounded verisimilitude of lived experience to its vast mysteries, but also capturing a numinous, vatic strangeness that hints at genuine profundities about life. Nobody else writes like MacInnes, and this magnificent book is his best yet." In The Observer, John Self stated: "The mystery of where Leigh will end up is so enticing that it's a shame when the last substantive section of the book returns us to Earth and family life, with a thud of crammed backstory and a few future shocks. But an uncertain finish doesn't damage what went before. Indeed, it's an apt approach for a book that reminds us to value above all the journey we are on, and the world we live in." Writing for The Financial Times, Carl Wilkinson stated: "MacInnes deftly interweaves the science of cellular biology with the politics of familial relationships while using the tropes of science fiction to expand his novel’s horizons." With Wilkinson concluding that: "The control, the subtlety, the nuance and the richness of the novel is endlessly rewarding." Writing for The Times Literary Supplement, Beejay Silcox praised MacInnes for his insightful depiction of different characters in the book, stating: "In Ascension finds as much poetry in the human microbiome as it does in the grand revolutions of the planets."
