= Mick Burns (hurler) =

Irish hurler (1937–2023)

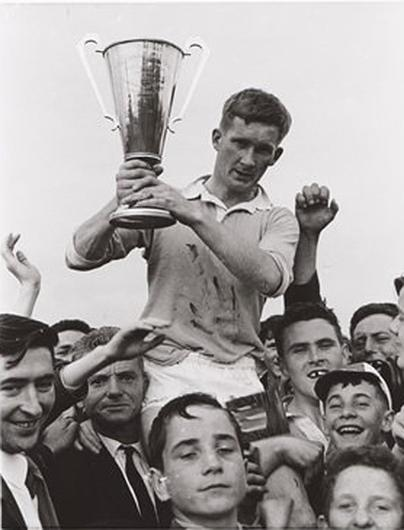

Personal information
- Native name: Mícheál Ó Broin (Irish)
- Born: 1937 Nenagh, County Tipperary, Ireland
- Died: 22 February 2023 (aged 85) Nenagh, County Tipperary, Ireland
- Height: 5 ft 9 in (175 cm)

Sport
- Sport: Hurling
- Position: Right wing-back
Club
- Years: Club
- Nenagh Éire Óg
Inter-county
- Years: County
- 1958–1968: Tipperary
Inter-county titles
- Munster titles: 8
- All-Irelands: 5
- NHL: 6

Mick Burns (1937 – 22 February 2023) was an Irish hurler who played for his local club Nenagh Éire Óg and was a member of the Tipperary senior inter-county team in the 1950s and 1960s.

== Career ==
Burns was born in Nenagh, County Tipperary. He won five All-Ireland titles and eight Munster titles with Tipperary between 1958 and 1968. He won two North Tipperary Senior Hurling Championships with Éire Óg in 1957 and as captain in 1964.

== Death ==
Burns died on 22 February 2023, at the age of 85.

== Honours ==
Tipperary

- All-Ireland Senior Hurling Championship (5): 1958, 1961, 1962, 1964, 1965
- Munster Senior Hurling Championship (8): 1958, 1960, 1961, 1962, 1964, 1965, 1967, 1968
- National Hurling League (6): 1958–59, 1959–60, 1960–61, 1963–64, 1964–65, 1967–68
- Oireachtas Cup (4): 1960, 1961, 1963, 1964
- All-Ireland Minor Hurling Championship (1): 1955
- Munster Minor Hurling Championship (2): 1954, 1955

Munster

- Railway Cup (1): 1963

Nenagh Éire Óg

- North Tipperary Senior Hurling Championship (2): 1957, 1964 (c)
- North Tipperary Minor A Hurling Championship (3): 1951, 1953, 1955
