= Taoglas =

RF equipment manufacturer

- Founded: Enniscorthy, County Wexford, Ireland (2004)
- Founder: Dermot O'Shea; Ronan Quinlan
- Headquarters: Dublin, Ireland
- Number of employees: 400
- Website: www.taoglas.com

Taoglas, headquartered in Dublin, Ireland, is a manufacturer of RF antennas, RF Receivers, speakers and other modules.

The company was founded in 2004 in Enniscorthy, County Wexford and in 2021, with their main headquarters located in Dublin.

In February 2023, the company was purchased by US based [Graham Partners].

In July 2023, the European Commission engaged with the Irish Government after Taoglas components were discovered in Russian bombs used to attack Ukraine during the Russo-Ukrainian War.

In March 2026, a YouTube video showed the debris of a Shahed drone launched at the Sovereign Base Area (SBA) of Akrotiri, in Cyprus, on March 1. The clip showed the drone contained a Russian Kometa electronic warfare [EW] system, which was itself built using components from Taoglas.

== Worldwide locations ==
US headquarters:

- San Diego, California

Production sites:

- Taiwan: Taoyuan, Tainan
- Other: India: Ahmedabad

== See also ==
- Radio frequency
- Antenna (radio)
