= Pierce Higgins =

Irish hurler (1977–2023)

Personal information
- Native name: Piaras Ó hUiginn (Irish)
- Born: 1977 Ballyhaunis, County Mayo, Ireland
- Died: 20 January 2023 (aged 45) Ballyhaunis, County Mayo, Ireland
- Occupation: Cabinet maker

Sport
- Sport: Hurling
- Position: Full-forward
Clubs
- Years: Club
- 1994–1996 1997–2016: Tooreen; Ballyhaunis
Club titles
- Mayo titles: 14
Inter-county
- Years: County
- 1997–2010: Mayo
Inter-county titles
- All-Irelands: 0
- NHL: 3
- All Stars: 0

Pierce Higgins (1977 – 20 January 2023) was an Irish hurler. At club level he played with Ballyhaunis and was also a member of the Mayo senior hurling team.

== Career ==
Higgins first played hurling with the Tooreen club and won consecutive Mayo SHC titles in 1994 and 1995. He was later a founder-member of the Ballyhaunis club in 1997 and spent 20 seasons with the club's senior team. Higgins won a further 12 Mayo SHC titles between 2002 and 2016. He was joint-manager of the Ballyhaunis team that won the Mayo SHC title in 2020.

At inter-county level, Higgins first appeared for Mayo as a member of the minor team that won All-Ireland MCHC titles in 1994 and 1995. He later had a 14-year association with the senior team and was part of the panel that won the All-Ireland JHC title in 2003. Higgins also won several National League medals in Division 3 and Division 4.

== Personal life and death ==
His brother, Keith Higgins, is a six-time All-Ireland SFC runner-up with the Mayo senior football team. Higgins was diagnosed with motor neuron disease in 2017.

Higgins died on 20 January 2023, at the age of 45.

== Honours ==
=== Player ===
Tooreen

- Mayo Senior Hurling Championship: 1994, 1995

Ballyhaunis

- Mayo Senior Hurling Championship: 2002, 2004, 2005, 2006, 2008, 2009, 2010, 2011, 2012, 2014, 2015, 2016, 2020

Mayo

- All-Ireland Junior Hurling Championship: 2003
- Connacht Junior Hurling Championship: 2003, 2004
- National Hurling League Division 3: 1998, 2003
- National Hurling League Division 4: 2002
- All-Ireland Minor C Hurling Championship: 1994, 1995

=== Manager ===
Ballyhaunis

- Mayo Senior Hurling Championship: 2020
