= Tony O'Donoghue (sports commentator) =

Irish athlete and broadcaster (1936–2023)

- Born: 1936; Raheny, Dublin, Ireland
- Died: 26 February 2023 (aged 86); Raheny, Dublin, Ireland
- Occupation: Broadcaster
- Years active: 1972–2012
- Employer: Raidió Teilifís Éireann (RTÉ)
- Spouse: Maureen O'Neill (died 2012)
- Children: 4

Tony O'Donoghue (1936 – 26 February 2023) was an Irish sports broadcaster who was active on Raidió Teilifís Éireann (RTÉ).

== Career ==
O'Donoghue was a noted middle-distance runner in his youth. He was one of the home representatives in the Golden Mile race in Santry in 1958 when Herb Elliott, Murray Halberg, Ronnie Delany, Albie Thomas and Merv Lincoln all ran sub four-minute miles in the same race. O'Donoghue later became involved in administrative affairs and was appointed to the first committee of Bord Lúthchleas na hÉireann in 1967.

O'Donoghue subsequently enjoyed a 40-year career as athletics commentator with RTÉ. He commentated at every Olympic Games from Munich 1972 to London 2012. One of O'Donoghue's most memorable commentaries was Eamonn Coghlan's victory in the 5,000m at the 1983 World Championships.

== Personal life and death ==
O'Donoghue was married to Maureen O'Neill and the couple had four children - two boys and two girls. His wife predeceased him in January 2012.

O'Donoghue died at his home in Raheny on 26 February 2023, at the age of 86.
