= Study for Obedience =

2023 book by Sarah Bernstein

- Author: Sarah Bernstein
- Language: English
- Publisher: Knopf Canada
- Publication date: 2023
- Publication place: Canada
- Pages: 208
- ISBN: 9781039009066

Study for Obedience is a 2023 novel by Canadian author Sarah Bernstein, published by Knopf Canada, a subsidiary of Penguin Random House. The novel tells of an unnamed narrator who moves to a secluded area of an unnamed northern country to care for her older brother. The narrator soon realizes that the townspeople revile her, an allegory for antisemitism.

The novel was shortlisted for the 2023 Booker Prize, and was the winner of the 2023 Giller Prize.

The novel was published in French by Éditions Alto in a translation by Catherine Leroux in 2024.

== Narrative ==
The unnamed narrator moves to a remote part of an unnamed northern country to become her brother's caretaker after his divorce. A series of unexplained and bizarre events occur in the town shortly after her arrival, including a dog's "phantom pregnancy", a sow crushing her own piglets, a potato blight, and cattle becoming demented. She soon realizes that the townspeople blame her for these events. The townspeople revile and often fear her. They are seen crossing themselves at times when interacting with her, covering their children's eyes, and huddling behind counters at her presence. The narrator explains that she and her brother belonged to "an obscure though reviled people who had been dogged across borders and put into pits."

== Reception ==
The CBC stated that the novel is "a finely tuned, unsettling novel that confirms Bernstein as one of the most exciting voices of her generation." In a negative review in The Guardian, literary critic Chris Power criticized the novel's abstract plot and lack of detail as being inadequate to portray the immigrant or the Jewish experience. He states: "The nature of her crisis, withheld like so much else, is revealed as a generational form of survivor’s guilt, but its rapid resolution, and the vagueness of her engagement with its root cause, makes for an oddly frictionless, even privileged, journey into trauma." Also writing for The Guardian, Miriam Balanescu states that "The narrator's encounters with modern-day antisemitism are captured acutely and absurdly." Balanescu concluded that "This masterly follow-up to her debut acts as a meditation on survival, the dangers of absorbing the narratives of the powerful, and a warning that the self-blame of the oppressed often comes back to bite."
