= Aimée Walsh =

Irish writer

- Born: Belfast, Northern Ireland
- Education: Liverpool John Moores University, Queen's University Belfast
- Occupations: Novelist, journalist, academic
- Writing career
- Language: English
- Genres: Fiction, literary criticism, journalism
- Notable work: Exile (2024)

Aimée Walsh (born Belfast, Northern Ireland) is an Irish novelist, journalist, and academic. Her debut novel Exile was published in 2024. Walsh is a Columnist and Deputy Editor at the Daily Mirror, where she writes on books, feminism, and culture, and has been shortlisted for the Society of Editors Media Freedom Awards. She has written for The Irish Times, RTÉ Culture, The Observer, and The Independent, and her scholarly work focuses on Irish literature, gender, and cultural history, including the monograph Writing Resistance in Northern Ireland (Liverpool University Press, 2024). Walsh also led and presented a three-part investigative documentary series on an online suicide forum for the Daily Mirror YouTube channel.

== Early life and education ==
Walsh was born in Belfast, Northern Ireland. She attended Belfast Royal Academy. She studied an undergraduate degree at Liverpool John Moores University (LJMU), before undertaking a Master's degree at Queen's University Belfast. She returned to Liverpool John Moore's University, where she completed a PhD in Irish Literature and Cultural History in 2020.

== Academic work ==
Walsh's research focuses on Irish literature, gender, nationalism, and cultural history.

Her monograph, Writing Resistance in Northern Ireland, was published by Liverpool University Press in 2024. Reviewers praised the breadth of materials used as evidence; Walsh discusses historical accounts, fictional narratives, documentaries, testimonies, pamphlets and poetry. Critics argued that this study added to the knowledge of both republicanism and feminism in Northern Ireland, with a review in Irish Studies Review calling it an "exciting contribution" to the field.

== Journalism and commentary ==
Walsh contributes opinion, social commentary, and literary criticism to a range of publications. As of 2026, she works as a Columnist and Deputy Editor at the Daily Mirror. There, she led and presented a three-part investigative documentary series called 'Buy To Die' on an online suicide forum and a legal poison, available on the Daily Mirror YouTube channel. Before joining the Daily Mirror, she wrote regularly for: The Irish Times and RTÉ Culture as a book critic. Walsh has also written for: The Observer; Refinery29; Service95; The Independent; Dublin Review of Books; Stylist Magazine. In 2025, she was shortlisted for the Society of Editors Media Freedom Awards under the "Commentator of the Year (Popular)" category.

== Literary career ==
Walsh's debut novel, Exile, was published by John Murray on 23 May 2024. It follows a young Irish woman who is assaulted shortly before leaving moving from Belfast to Liverpool for university. Walsh described it as "a novel primarily about the aftermath of sexual violence, the shifting nature of friendships, and that particular feeling of leaving home at 18".

The Irish Times described the novel as "somewhere between Nikolai Gogol and Sally Rooney", praising it as "among the best of contemporary Irish fiction". The Irish Examiner called it "a brilliant novel about friendship, consent and displacement from a vibrant new voice."

== Selected works ==
=== Novels ===
- Exile (John Murray, 2024)

=== Academic publications ===
- Walsh, Aimée. "'Curiosity with corpses': Poetry, nationalism and gender in Seamus Heaney's North (1975) and Medbh McGuckian's The Flower Master (1982)." Journal of Gender Studies, 30(3): 317–328 (2021).
- Writing Resistance in Northern Ireland (Liverpool University Press, 2024).
