= Chetna Maroo =

Indian-British author

Chetna Maroo is a British Indian author. Her debut novel, Western Lane, was shortlisted for the 2023 Booker Prize.

== Personal life ==
Maroo was born in Kenya. As of 2023, she lived in London.

== Career ==
Maroo was originally employed as an accountant before devoting herself to writing full time.

In 2023, she published her debut novel, Western Lane, with Farrar, Straus and Giroux.

== Western Lane ==
Maroo's debut novel, Western Lane, was published February 7, 2023 by Farrar, Straus and Giroux. The novel follows Gopi, an 11-year-old girl who has been playing squash since she could first grasp a racket. Following her mother's death, her father begins training her more intensely. With this training, she drifts away from her sisters and cares only about squash. When she's on the court, she feels more connected to her father and connects with Ged, who also excels playing squash. Further, she feels connected to everyone who played on the court before her.

Western Lane received a starred review from Kirkus Reviews, who called it "a debut novel of immense poise and promise."

Given the familiar storyline presented, The Guardian's Caleb Klaces noted that readers "might expect Western Lane to feel formulaic, but it doesn’t. It feels like the work of a writer who knows what they want to do, and who has the rare ability to do it."

American novelist and squash player Ivy Pochoda, writing for The New York Times Book Review, called Western Lane "polished and disciplined", saying, "The beauty of Maroo’s novel lies in that unfolding, the narrative shaped as much by what is on the page as by what’s left unsaid". Similarly, Shelf Awareness's Shahina Piyarali called Maroo "a marvelous and restrained storyteller".

Publishers Weekly called Western Lane "compact and powerful," highlighting how "Maroo skillfully balances" the novel's varied dramas.

Booklist also reviewed the novel, as well the audiobook, noting that "London actor [Maya] Saroya is a gentle, measured cipher, moving seamlessly between the crisper British English of the sisters and their contemporaries and the more lyrical South Asian accents of the older generation. Hers is an unhurried performance, as if leaving open breathing room for the unspeakable, the absent, and perhaps even a little space for hopeful potential."

== Awards and honors ==
Awards for Maroo's writing
Year	Title	Award	Result	Ref.
2022	"Brothers and Sisters"	Plimpton Prize for Fiction	Won	
2023	Western Lane	Booker Prize	Shortlisted	
2023	Western Lane	William Hill Sports Book of the Year	Longlisted	
2024	Western Lane	Women's Prize for Fiction	Longlisted	

== Publications ==
- Western Lane. Farrar, Straus and Giroux. 2023. ISBN 9780374607494.
