= John Joe Walsh =

Irish Gaelic footballer and administrator (1940–2023)

Personal information
- Native name: Seán Seosamh Breathnach (Irish)
- Born: 1940 Swinford, County Mayo, Ireland
- Died: 10 April 2023 (aged 82) Athy, County Kildare, Ireland
- Occupations: Bord na Móna, Roadstone

Sport
- Sport: Gaelic football
- Position: Left corner-forward
Clubs
- Years: Club
- St Laurence's; St Mary's Rochfortbridge
Club titles
- Kildare titles: 0
Inter-county
- Years: County
- 1960–1961: Kildare
Inter-county titles
- Leinster titles: 0
- All-Irelands: 0
- NFL: 0

John Joseph Walsh (1940 – 10 April 2023) was an Irish Gaelic footballer, selector and administrator. At club level he played with St Laurence's and St Mary's Rochfortbridge, and also lined out at inter-county level with Kildare, Mayo and Westmeath.

== Playing career ==
Walsh first played Gaelic football as a student at St Nathy's College in Ballaghaderreen. He won a Connacht Colleges SFC medal in 1959, however, St Nathy's were beaten by St Joseph's CBS in the subsequent All-Ireland final.

At inter-county level, Walsh first appeared as a member of the Kildare team in 1960 and 1961. He won a Connacht JFC medal with Mayo in 1963, before later playing with Westmeath. Walsh ended his inter-county career by winning a Leinster JFC medal with Kildare in 1970.

Walsh played his club football at one time with St Mary's Rochfortbridge, however, it was as a member of the St Laurence's club that he had the longest association. He won a Kildare JBFC medal in 1975 before adding a Kildare IFC medal to his collection in 1980.

== Administrative career ==
Walsh served as selector and manager at all levels with various St Laurence's teams. He became involved in the management of the Kildare senior team as selector under Eamon O'Donoghue, Dermot Earley and Mick O'Dwyer. Walsh was also heavily involved in the administrative affairs of his club, first as secretary and 17 years as chairperson. Walsh represented the club at County Board level and acted as Kildare's delegate on the Leinster Council, becoming Leinster PRO.

== Death ==
Walsh died on 10 April 2023, at the age of 82.

== Honours ==
=== Player ===
St Nathy's College

- Connacht Colleges Senior Football Championship: 1959

St Laurence's

- Kildare Intermediate Football Championship: 1980
- Kildare Junior B Football Championship: 1975

Mayo

- Connacht Junior Football Championship: 1963

Kildare

- Leinster Junior Football Championship: 1970

=== Management ===
Kildare

- Leinster Senior Hurling Championship: 2000
