= EIRSAT-1 =

Irish space satellite (2023)

- Names: Educational Irish Research Satellite-1
- Mission type: Technology demonstration
- Operator: University College Dublin
- COSPAR ID: 2023-185L
- SATCAT no.: 58472
- Website: eirsat1.ie
- Mission duration: Planned: 9-24 months Final: 1 year, 9 months, 8 days

Spacecraft properties
- Spacecraft: CubeSat
- Spacecraft type: 2U CubeSat
- Manufacturer: University College Dublin
- Launch mass: 2.305 kg (5.08 lb)
- Dimensions: 10.67 cm × 10.67 cm × 22.7 cm (4.20 in × 4.20 in × 8.94 in)
- Power: 2.217 watts

Start of mission
- Launch date: 1 December 2023, 18:19 UTC
- Rocket: Falcon 9 B1061-17
- Launch site: Vandenberg SLC-4E
- Contractor: SpaceX

End of mission
- Decay date: 4 September 2025

Orbital parameters
- Reference system: Geocentric
- Regime: Sun-synchronous

Transponders
- Band: UHF
- Frequency: 437.1 MHz
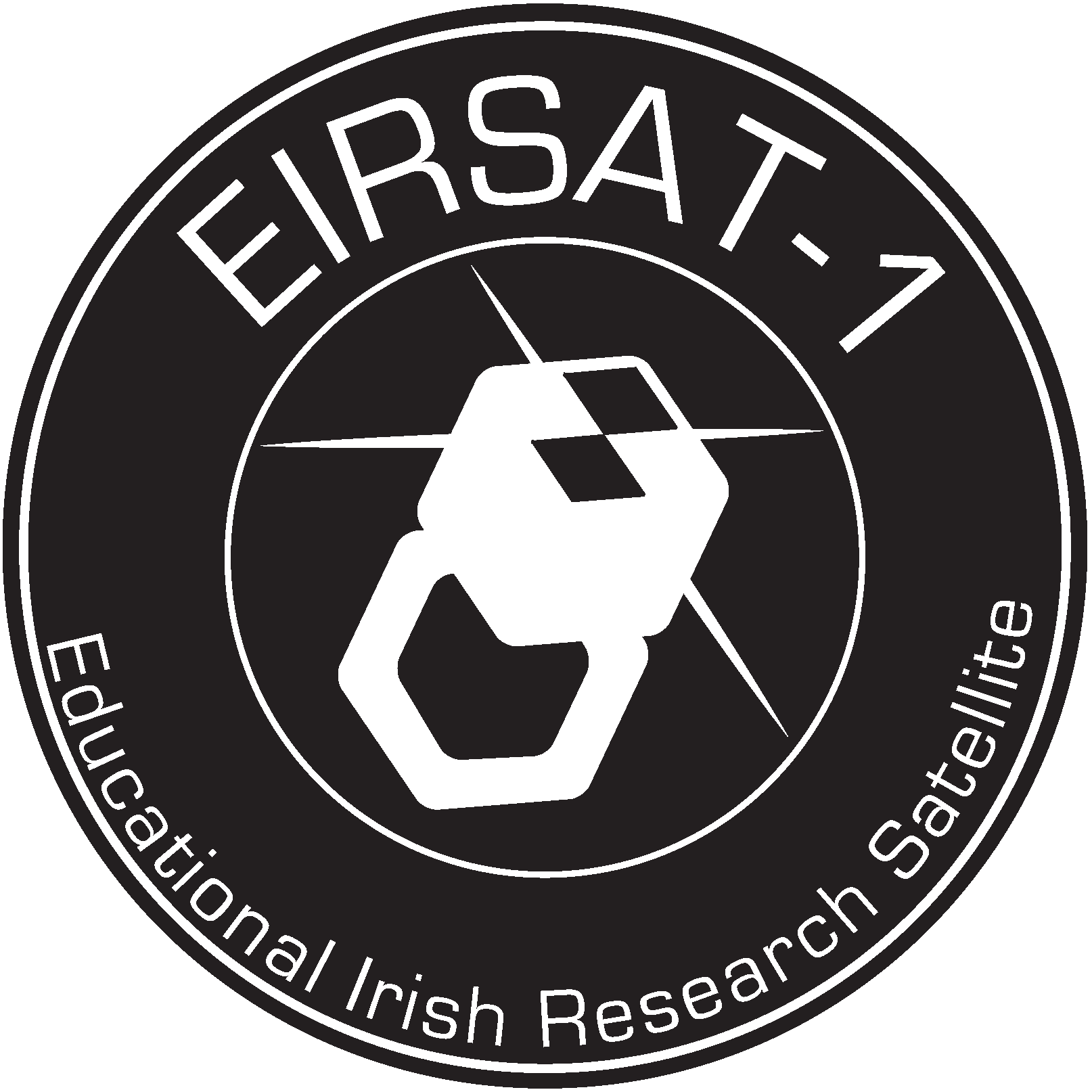
- Fly Your Satellite!

EIRSAT-1 (Educational Irish Research Satellite-1) was a European Space Agency-sponsored 2U CubeSat developed and built by University College Dublin (UCD) in Dublin, Ireland.

The satellite was launched on 1 December 2023 by a Falcon 9 rocket from Vandenberg Space Force Base, California. Upon reaching orbit, it became Ireland's first satellite. It reentered the atmosphere on 4 September 2025.

== Background ==
In March 2017, UCD students and professors proposed the satellite to the European Space Agency (ESA) Fly Your Satellite! 2 (FYS 2) educational program for universities. In May 2017, UCD was one of six university teams selected to participate in the ESA FYS2 program. The mission passed its Preliminary Design Review (PDR) with both institutions involved, and following the Critical Design Review (CDR) in 2018, the mission was developed and implemented by UCD with the support of the ESA Education Office. Lorraine Hanlon, EIRSAT-1 Endorsing Professor, introduced the project during a panel after the Irish premiere of the film "16 Levers de Soleil" on 31 January 2019.

The satellite cost €1,500,000 and was funded jointly by the ESA, the Irish Research Council, and Science Foundation Ireland.

== Mission ==
The mission of EIRSAT-1 was to advance education in space science and engineering across the whole island of Ireland through collaboration between student teams, higher education institutions, and high-tech companies.

The objectives of EIRSAT-1 were to:

- develop the know-how of the Irish higher education sector in space science and engineering by supporting student teams to build, test, and operate the satellite;
- address skills shortages in the Irish space sector by fostering collaboration between student teams and industry through the launch of three payloads that demonstrated innovative Irish technology;
- inspire the next generation of students towards the study of science and technology subjects by launching the first Irish satellite.

== Payloads ==
EIRSAT-1 carried three Irish-developed experiments, or payloads.

=== GMOD - The Gamma-ray Module ===
The first payload element (called the ‘Gamma-ray Module’ or ‘GMOD’) was a miniaturised sensor for use in the detection of gamma-rays from both cosmic and atmospheric phenomena. The sensor was a silicon photomultiplier (SiPM) that was developed by SensL Ltd. in County Cork (currently part of ON Semiconductor). The SiPM has the potential to revolutionise in-situ and remote sensing of gamma-rays in space by removing the need for conventional photomultiplier tubes that are typically very bulky, fragile and require high voltages to operate.

=== EMOD - the ENBIO Module ===
The second payload element (called the ‘ENBIO Module’ or ‘EMOD’) provided in-orbit demonstration of novel protective oxide surface treatments made by ENBIO Ltd. (SolarWhite and SolarBlack). These surface treatments were developed for use on the ESA Solar Orbiter mission, and EIRSAT-1 provided the opportunity for these coatings to be thermally tested. The temperature of the coatings were measured throughout the mission.

=== WBC - Wave Based Control ===
The third payload was a novel, software-based attitude control system developed by the Dynamics and Control Group in the UCD School of Mechanical and Materials Engineering (a spacecraft's "attitude" is its orientation in space). In this case it used the Earth's magnetic field to turn itself in any desired direction. The UCD control technique is called “Wave-Based Control” (WBC). EIRSAT-1 used a standard control system, initially. During the mission, in response to an instruction from Earth, the on-board computer began using WBC to control the satellite's attitude, thereby evaluating its performance and, it was hoped, qualifying WBC for space flight.

== Launch and operations ==
Subject to successful reviews, the spacecraft was initially scheduled to be launched in 2023 on a Vega-C rocket as part of the Small Satellites Mission Service #5 rideshare mission. However, after delays, the CubeSat was remanifested on the maiden flight of the Ariane 6 rocket. This was later changed to a rideshare payload of the South Korean 425 Project SAR satellite launch, which took place at 18:19 UTC on 1 December 2023 on a SpaceX's Falcon 9 Block 5 launch vehicle. The payload was launched into a Sun-synchronous orbit.

The European Space Agency announced on 15 March 2024 that the satellite had been in space for 100 days and had performed more than 1,500 orbits at an altitude of 515 kilometres.

On 21 August 2024, the Gamma-ray Module onboard EIRSAT-1 detected its first gamma-ray burst (GRB), a long type GRB which was given the official designation GRB240821B. This type of GRBs is caused by the death of a high-mass star. Gamma-ray Module's second detection of a GRB was made one hour and 19 minutes after the first one and it was a short one, a much rarer type which is likely caused by the collision of two neutron stars and the formation of a black hole. This second detection was given the official designation GRB240821A.

The satellite eventually reentered Earth's atmosphere on 4 September 2025, after 643 days in space.
