= Paul Lynch (writer) =

Irish writer (born 1977)

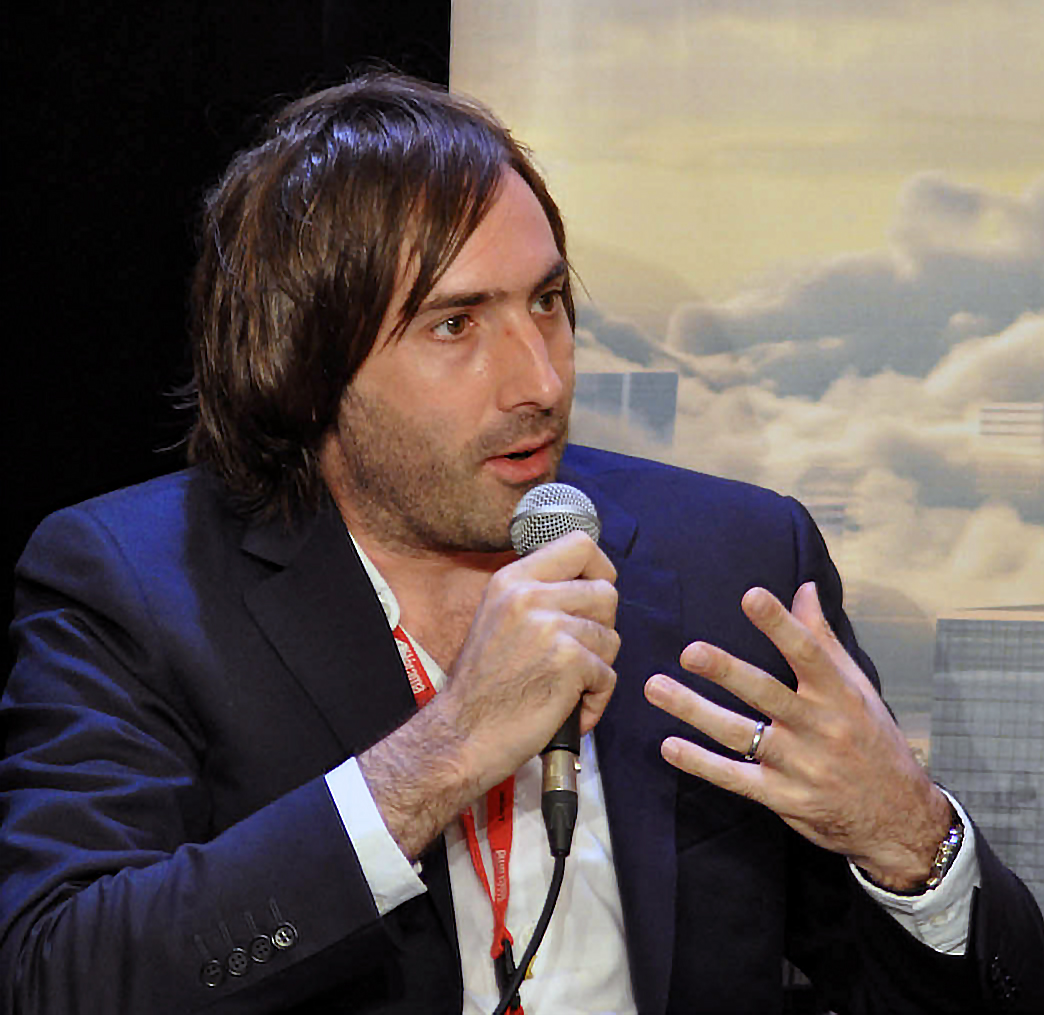
- Lynch in 2014
- Born: May 9, 1977 (age 49); Limerick, Ireland
- Occupation: Novelist
- Writing career
- Genre: Fiction
- Notable works: The Black Snow (2014); Grace (2017); Prophet Song (2023)
- Notable awards: Prix Libr'à Nous (2016); Kerry Group Irish Novel of the Year (2018); Booker Prize (2023)
- Website: Official website

Paul Lynch (born 1977) is an Irish novelist known for his poetic, lyrical style and exploration of complex themes. He has published five novels and has won several awards, including the 2018 Kerry Group Irish Fiction Award and the 2023 Booker Prize, for Prophet Song.

== Early life and education ==
Lynch was born in Limerick in the south-west of Ireland in 1977; his parents and all his family are from Limerick and other parts of County Limerick. However, when he was nine months old, his parents moved to the north of County Donegal in Ulster, the northern province in Ireland, where he was raised. They settled in the north of Inishowen, a peninsula on the northern coastline of Ulster, with Lynch spending the rest of his childhood and teenage years at Malin Head and, later, in Carndonagh. His parents moved to Inishowen because of his father's job with the then Coast and Cliff Rescue Service (CCRS), which later became, in 1991, the Irish Marine Emergency Service (IMES; now called the Irish Coast Guard). His mother was an adult literacy teacher, and Paul is the eldest child of his parents' three children.

Lynch has not lived in County Donegal since 1995. He read English and Philosophy at University College, Dublin (UCD), but did not graduate. He is a longtime resident of Dublin, where he was formerly both deputy chief sub-editor and chief film critic for The Sunday Tribune, before he turned to writing fiction.

== Writing career ==
His debut novel, Red Sky in Morning, was the subject of a six-publisher auction in London, and won him acclaim in the United States and France, where the book was a finalist for France's Prix du Meilleur Livre Étranger (Best Foreign Book Award). The novel was inspired by a TV documentary about the excavation of Duffy's Cut, a site near Philadelphia where, in the 1830s, Irish emigrants, mainly from Ulster, were discovered in an unmarked mass grave. It explores themes of emigration, racism and brutality and was described by NPR's Alan Cheuse as the work of a "lapidary young master".

Lynch's second novel, The Black Snow, describes the return of an Irish emigrant to his native community in County Donegal and the subsequent descent into tragedy when a byre catches fire. The novel was shortlisted for many prizes and won France's Prix Libr'à Nous for best foreign novel. In The Sunday Times Ireland, Theo Dorgan called the book "a significant achievement".

His third novel, Grace (2017), is both a bildungsroman and picaresque set during the Irish Famine and tells the story of a young girl's struggle for survival. The novel won the Kerry Group Irish Novel of the Year prize and was shortlisted for many awards, including The Walter Scott Prize for Historical Fiction. In a review, The New York Times said: "Lynch is a sure-footed tightrope walker...his lush, poetic prose [in Grace] deliberately and painfully acts as a foil to the reality of the famine."

Lynch's fourth novel, Beyond the Sea (2019), was inspired by a true event and is an existential tale involving two castaways set on a boat in the Pacific Ocean. The novel has been compared to the work of Ernest Hemingway, Samuel Beckett, Herman Melville, William Golding, Fyodor Dostoyevsky and Pablo Neruda by various reviewers, and won France's Prix Gens de Mers in 2022.

Lynch's fifth novel, Prophet Song, has been described as "a chilling study of Ireland becoming a fascist state". According to The New York Times, the novel received mixed reviews in Ireland and Britain upon its initial publication. Prophet Song was described by The Guardian as "an impressive novel in stylistic as well as political terms", and it went on to receive the Booker Prize for 2023.

Maynooth University appointed Lynch as Distinguished Writing Fellow in 2024, contributing to their MA in Creative Writing program.

== Literary themes and style ==
Lynch's novels often focus on the trials of the human spirit and examine metaphysical and existentialist themes in both Irish and exotic settings. His work explores topics such as alienation, displacement, suffering, reality, belief, religion, and transcendence, as well as meditations on memory and identity.

Lynch's writing has been described as "bold, grandiose, mesmeric," and he has been compared to authors such as Cormac McCarthy, William Faulkner, Herman Melville, Seamus Heaney, and Samuel Beckett. He has been praised for his ability to blend poetic language with gritty realism and for his insights into the human condition. He is considered one of the most important Irish writers of his generation.

== Personal life ==
Lynch has two children and is separated from his wife.

== Awards ==
- 2013: Best Newcomer at Bord Gáis Irish Books of the Year, shortlisted
- 2014: Prix du Meilleur Livre Étranger, finalist
- 2014: Prix du Premier Roman, nominated
- 2015: Prix du Roman Fnac, nominated
- 2015: Prix Femina, nominated
- 2016: Ireland Francophonie Ambassadors' Literary Award, shortlisted
- 2016: Prix des Lecteurs Privat, winner
- 2016: Prix Libr'à Nous for Best Foreign Novel, winner
- 2018: Kerry Group Irish Novel of the Year Award, winner
- 2018: Walter Scott Prize, shortlisted
- 2018: William Saroyan International Prize, shortlisted
- 2019: Grand Prix de L'Héroïne, shortlisted
- 2019: Prix Littérature Monde, shortlisted
- 2019: Prix Jean-Monnet de Littérature Européenne, shortlisted
- 2020: Ireland Francophonie Ambassadors' Literary Award, winner
- 2022: Prix Gens de Mer, winner
- 2023: Booker Prize, winner
- 2025: International Dublin Literary Award, for Prophet Song, Longlisted

== Works ==
- —— (2013). Red Sky in Morning. London: Quercus.
- —— (2014). The Black Snow. London: Quercus.
- —— (2017). Grace. London: Oneworld Publications.
- —— (2019). Beyond the Sea. London: Oneworld Publications.
- —— (2023). Prophet Song. London: Oneworld Publications.
