= John O'Grady (referee) =

Irish hurling referee (1940–2023)

John O'Grady (1940 – 1 July 2023) was an Irish hurling referee.

Born in Mungret, County Limerick, O'Grady first played hurling with Young Irelands and Gaelic football with the Commercials club in Limerick. He later played with the Mungret/St Paul's club and was part of the team that won the Limerick JHC title after a defeat of Bruff in 1969.

O'Grady was just 18 years old when he first became involved in refereeing. His first refereeing engagement was a tournament game between Patrickswell and Ballybrown. O'Grady was later added to the provincial and national panel of referees. He famously sent off Cork's Denis Coughlan in the 1972 Munster final, however, his decision was later rescinded with O'Grady writing him an apology. He also refereed the 1977 All-Ireland final between Cork and Wexford.

O'Grady died on 1 July 2023, at the age of 83.
