= St Mary of the Rosary Church =

St Mary's
- St Mary of the Rosary Church
- St Mary's
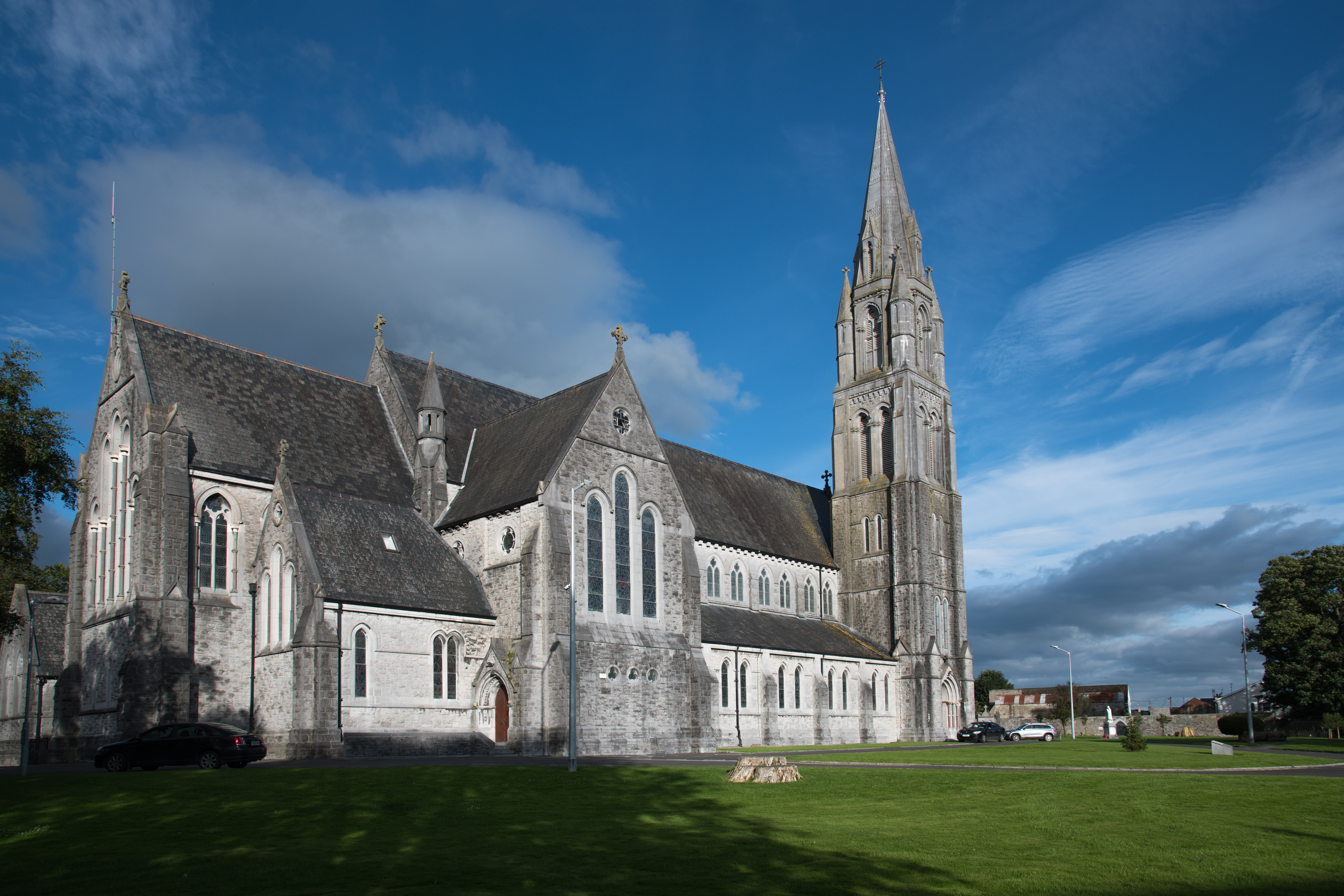
- Location: Nenagh
- Denomination: Catholic
- Website: Our Website

History
- Status: Active
- Dedication: Michael Flannery
- Dedicated: 23 August 1896
- Consecrated: 23 August 1896

Administration
- Archdiocese: Killaloe

Clergy
- Archbishop: Bishop of Killaloe

St Mary of the Rosary Church is a Catholic Church in the Diocese of Killaloe in the town of Nenagh, Ireland.

== History ==
It was Bishop of Killaloe Michael Flannery who first proposed St Mary's as Cathedral Church of Killaloe Diocese. It is thus to be reckoned as one of the finest churches to be found in its country. The foundation stone of St Mary's was laid on 2 October 1892, and later was consecrated and dedicated on 23 August 1896. The church building including its 60.7 m (199 feet) spire was completed in 1906.

== Operations and events ==
St Mary of the Rosary Church shuts its doors, during the summer, at 8 p.m. on weekdays and 7 p.m. on Sundays. As of 2023, the parish priest was Father Patrick Gilbert.

The church has hosted many attendees and events. Nick Cave has attended. The funeral of Shane MacGowan was held in St Mary's on 8 December 2023, after his death. Johnny Depp said a prayer from the pulpit.
