= Eddie Spence =

Northern Irish Gaelic footballer (1925–1923)

Personal information
- Native name: Éamonn Mac Spealáin (Irish)
- Born: 9 August 1925 Belfast, Northern Ireland
- Died: 31 January 2023 (aged 97) Antrim, Northern Ireland

Sport
- Sport: Gaelic football
- Position: Forward
Club
- Years: Club
- Belfast O'Connell's
Club titles
- Antrim titles: 0
Inter-county
- Years: County
- Antrim
Inter-county titles
- Ulster titles: 1
- All-Irelands: 0
- NFL: 0

Edward Spence (9 August 1925 – 31 January 2023) was a Northern Irish Gaelic footballer. At club level he played with Belfast O'Connell's and at inter-county level with the Antrim senior football team. Spence usually lined out as a forward.

== Career ==
Spence first played Gaelic football as a schoolboy at St Malachy's College in Belfast. His performances saw him join the Belfast O'Connell's junior team while still underage, before making his first senior appearance as an 18-year-old.

After being overlooked for the Antrim minor football team, Spence first appeared on the inter-county scene as a member of the junior team. He soon progressed to the senior team. Spence was a member of the Antrim team that won the Ulster SFC title in 1946.

== Death ==
Spence died on 31 January 2023, at the age of 97.

== Honours ==
Antrim

- Ulster Senior Football Championship: 1946
