= Jonathan Escoffery =

Jamaican-American author of fiction

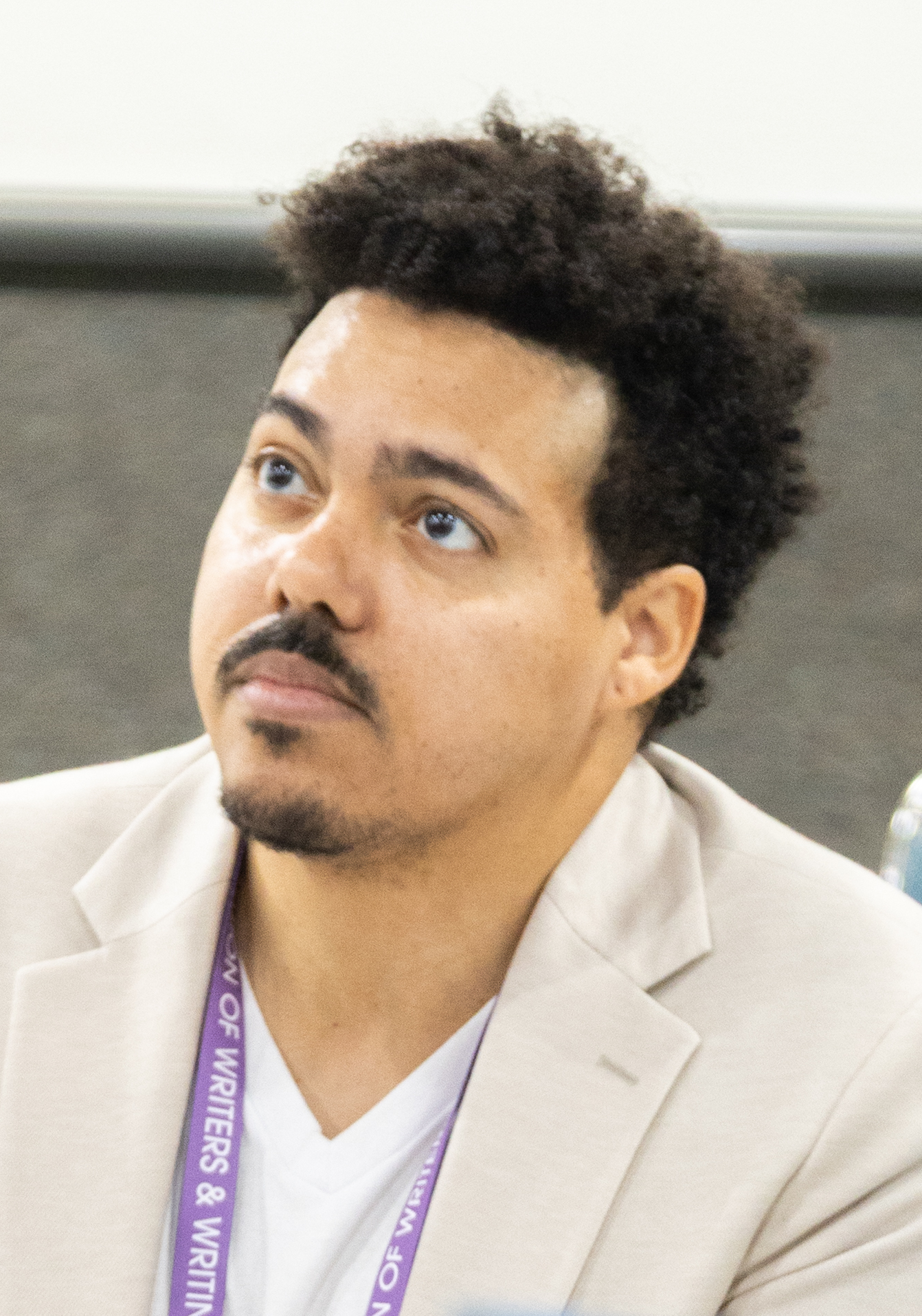
- Escoffery at AWP 2025
- Born: Houston, Texas, United States
- Education: Florida International University (BA); University of Minnesota (MFA)
- Notable works: If I Survive You (2022)

Website
- jonathanescoffery.com

Jonathan Escoffery is an American writer. His debut novel, If I Survive You, was longlisted for the 2022 National Book Award for Fiction and shortlisted for the 2023 Booker Prize, among other honors. The novel was well received by critics with reviews applauding Escoffery's humor, narrative style, and exploration of identity in the immigrant experience.

== Biography ==
Escoffery was born in Houston, Texas, to Jamaican parents and grew up in Miami, Florida. Escoffery graduated from Florida International University and received a Masters of Fine Arts from the University of Minnesota. As of 2022, he was a Ph.D. candidate at the University of Southern California and was a Stegner Fellow at Stanford University.

Escoffery has cited Sandra Cisneros, Langston Hughes, and Nella Larsen as literary influences. He worked as the program coordinator for the writing center Grubstreet in Boston, where he started the Boston Writers of Color group. His short story "Under the Ackee Tree", which was published in The Paris Review, was awarded the Plimpton Prize.

== Awards and honors ==
In 2020, Escoffery received a fellowship from the National Endowment for the Arts.

In September 2022, If I Survive You was the Belletrist Book Club pick. Booklist included it on their 2022 "Booklist Editors' Choice list for adult books", as well as their 2023 list of the "Top 10 Historical Fiction Debuts".

Awards for Escoffery's writing
Year	Title	Award		Result	Ref.
2020	"Under the Ackee Tree"	Plimpton Prize	—	Won	
2022	If I Survive You	National Book Award	Fiction	Longlist	
2022	If I Survive You	National Book Critics Circle Award	John Leonard Prize	Shortlisted	
2023	If I Survive You	Aspen Words Literary Prize	—	Longlist	
2023	If I Survive You	Booker Prize	—	Shortlisted	
2023	If I Survive You	PEN/Faulkner Award for Fiction	—	Shortlisted	
2023	If I Survive You	Southern Book Prize	—	Shortlisted	
2023	If I Survive You	Gordon Burn Prize	—	Shortlisted	
2024	If I Survive You	International Dublin Literary Award	—	Shortlisted	

== Bibliography ==
=== Short story collections ===
- —— (2022). If I Survive You. New York: Farrar, Straus and Giroux. ISBN 9781982191818.
