= Sarah Bernstein =

Canadian writer and scholar

- Born: 23 April 1987 (age 38) Montreal, Quebec, Canada
- Occupation: Writer and academic
- Education: Concordia University; University of New Brunswick
- Notable works: Study for Obedience
- Notable awards: Giller Prize (2023)

Website
- thebookerprizes.com/the-booker-library/authors/sarah-bernstein

Sarah Bernstein (born April 23, 1987) is a Canadian writer and scholar. She was born in Montreal, Quebec, and now lives in Scotland where she teaches literature and creative writing. She has taught at the universities of Sheffield, Edinburgh and Strathclyde.

Her collection of prose poems Now Comes the Lightning appeared in 2015 and was shortlisted for the Robert Kroetsch Award for Innovative Writing. Her debut novel The Coming Bad Days was published in 2021. Her next novel, Study for Obedience, was shortlisted for the 2023 Booker Prize and won the 2023 Giller Prize.

In 2023, Bernstein was named by Granta as one of their twenty Best of Young British Novelists.

== Education ==
Bernstein earned a combined undergraduate degree in English and Creative Writing from Concordia University before pursuing a Master of Arts at the University of New Brunswick.

== Awards ==
Year	Title	Award	Category	Result	Ref.
2023	Study for Obedience	Booker Prize	—	Shortlisted	
2023	Study for Obedience	Giller Prize	—	Won	
2024	Study for Obedience	Scotland's National Book Awards	Fiction Book of the Year	Shortlisted	
2025	Study for Obedience	International Dublin Literary Award	—	Longlisted	

== Works ==
Novels

- The Coming Bad Days (2021)
- Study for Obedience (2023)

Poetry

- Now Comes the Lightning (2015)
