= The Atrix (band) =

Irish band

The Atrix were an Irish new wave/power pop band formed in mid 1978 by John Borrowman (guitar/vocals) and Chris Green (keyboards), both ex Berlin, Alan Finney on bass (ex Schoolkids) and drummer Hugh Friel, ex Slow Motion Orchestra. This lineup made the first demo recording ("Circus Tragedy") and appeared at the Carnsore Point Anti-Nuclear Rally in 1978. Finney was later replaced by Dick Conroy on bass.

They came out of the same Dublin theatre/cabaret scene as Jim Sheridan, The Radiators, Neil Jordan, Agnes Bernelle, Peter Sheridan and The Virgin Prunes. The Atrix combined a strong theatrical element to quirky but memorable tunes, the most striking examples being the singles "The Moon Is Puce" and "Treasure on the Wasteland".

The band released its first single "The Moon is Puce" on Seamus O'Neill's Mulligan label in late 1979 to modest acclaim in its local market. This first single was produced by Philip Chevron, then a member of The Radiators From Space and later of The Pogues. The band signed to Dave Dee's DoubleDee Records label in 1980 and the follow-up single "Treasure on the Wasteland" was produced by Ultravox guitarist and singer [Midge Ure] who later co-wrote and produced the biggest selling record ever in UK chart history - the 1984 Band Aid single "Do They Know It's Christmas?". The Atrix also supported then-chart toppers The Boomtown Rats (led by Live Aid founder Bob Geldof) on a 1981 four-week tour of Britain ending at The Rainbow in Finsbury Park, London on 18 January 1981. They released Procession, their only album (which included a free single "Procession"), in 1981.

Borrowman later teamed up with Frank West and the two wrote and recorded songs, playing gigs as Very Much in Love and The Atrix. They released two further singles as The Atrix: "Very Much in Love" and "Your Halo is Burning" (with Chris Green on keyboards and Dick Conroy on bass, produced by Andrew Boland). "Very Much in Love" was subsequently released in Denmark using the band name Afghan Trucks.

Borrowman also published two books of poetry: Weak Ends (self-published in Dublin, 1977) and Master of None (Beaver Row Press, Dublin, 1984).

John Borrowman died in Copenhagen in 1998. Chris Green died in August 2022. Hugh Friel died on 9 October 2023, at the age of 71.

== Regrouping ==
On 19 September 2019, The Atrix re-grouped (minus John and Chris) with Hughie Friel on vocals, Horslips' Jim Lockhart on keyboards and Paddy Goodwin on guitar for a live event celebrating the release of a special anthology album entitled Dublin 1979-1981 on both CD and vinyl. Before the live show at the Sugar Club, historian Donal Fallon hosted a discussion on the band's impact on Irish music which included the band's former manager Billy McGrath, and he also introduced performances from long-time friends, the poet and playwright Paula Meehan and the Irish stand-up comedian Kevin McAleer.

== Band members ==
- John Borrowman (guitar/vocals) (died 1998)
- Alan Finney (bass)
- Dick Conroy (bass)
- Chris Green (keyboards) (died August 2022)
- Hugh Friel (drums) (died October 2023)

== Discography ==
Singles

- "The Moon Is Puce"/"Wendy's In Amsterdam" (1979), Mulligan
- "Treasure On The Wasteland"/"Graphite Pile" (1980), Double D
- "Procession"/"The Eleventh Hour" (1981), Scoff
- "Very Much In Love"/"Continental Sites" (1986), Scoff; Trax On Wax (Denmark)
- "Your Halo is Burning"/"The Going Away Party (1986), Scoff

EP

- Triad ("Triad", "Circus Tragedy", "She Moves") (1982), Scoff

Albums

- Procession (1981), Scoff/Sound Products
- Dublin 1979-1981 (2019), Atrix

Compilations

- Just for Kicks (1979), Kick
- Non-Stop Pop (1982), RTE
- Stock 'n Trade (1983), Scoff

Solo Album by John Borrowman

- Stoned Circle
