= Arthur C. Clarke Award =

Award for best science fiction novel published in the UK in the previous year

- Awarded for: The best science fiction novel published in the United Kingdom in the prior calendar year
- Country: United Kingdom
- Presented by: British Science Fiction Association, Science Fiction Foundation, Sci-Fi-London
- First award: 1987
- Currently held by: E. J. Swift (When There Are Wolves Again)
- Website: www.clarkeaward.com

The Arthur C. Clarke Award is a British award given for the best science fiction novel first published in the United Kingdom during the previous year. It is named after British author Arthur C. Clarke, who gave a grant to establish the award in 1987. The book is chosen by a panel of judges from the British Science Fiction Association, the Science Fiction Foundation, and a third organisation, which as of 2019 is the Sci-Fi-London film festival. The award has been described as "the UK's most prestigious science fiction prize".

Any "full-length" science fiction novel written or translated into English is eligible for the prize, provided that it was first published in the United Kingdom during the prior calendar year. There is no restriction on the nationality of the author, and the publication history of works outside the United Kingdom is not taken into consideration. Books may be submitted for consideration by their publishing company, and, beginning in 2016, self-published titles have been eligible with certain qualifications. An official call for entries is issued to UK publishers every year and members of the judging panel and organisation committee also actively call in titles they would like to see submitted. A title must be actively submitted in order to be considered. The judges form a shortlist of six works that they feel are worthy of consideration, from which they select a winning book. The winner receives an engraved bookend and a prize consisting of a number of pounds sterling equal to the current year, such as £2012 for the year 2012. Prior to 2001, the award was £1000.

During the 40 nomination years, 166 authors have had works nominated, 36 of whom have won. China Miéville has won three times, while Pat Cadigan and Geoff Ryman have won twice each; no other author has won multiple times. Stephen Baxter and Gwyneth Jones have the most nominations, at seven each, and Baxter has the most nominations without winning. Neal Stephenson has won once out of six nominations; Ken MacLeod and Kim Stanley Robinson have also been nominated six times. Paul J. McAuley and Miéville have been nominated five times; McAuley has one win, whereas MacLeod and Robinson have none.

== Winners and nominees ==
In the following table, the years correspond to the date of the ceremony, rather than when the novel was first published. Each year links to the corresponding "year in literature". Entries with a yellow background and an asterisk (*) next to the writer's name have won the award; the other entries are the other nominees on the shortlist.

* Winners

Winners and nominees
Year	Author	Novel	Publisher	Ref.
1987	Margaret Atwood*	The Handmaid's Tale	McClelland & Stewart	
1987	Bob Shaw	The Ragged Astronauts	Victor Gollancz Ltd	
1987	Greg Bear	Eon	Victor Gollancz Ltd	
1987	Samuel R. Delany	Stars in My Pocket Like Grains of Sand	Grafton	
1987	Gwyneth Jones	Escape Plans	Allen & Unwin	
1987	Kim Stanley Robinson	The Memory of Whiteness	Futura/Macdonald	
1987	Josephine Saxton	Queen of the States	The Women's Press	
1987	Lucius Shepard	Green Eyes	Chatto & Windus	
1988	George Turner*	The Sea and Summer	Faber and Faber	
1988	Stanisław Lem	Fiasco	André Deutsch Publishing	
1988	Michael Bishop	Ancient of Days	Grafton	
1988	John Crowley	Aegypt	Victor Gollancz Ltd	
1988	Ken Grimwood	Replay	Grafton	
1988	Keith Roberts	Gráinne	Kerosina Books	
1988	H. F. Saint	Memoirs of an Invisible Man	Viking UK	
1989	Rachel Pollack*	Unquenchable Fire	Century Publishing	
1989	Brian Stableford	Empire of Fear	Simon & Schuster UK	
1989	Michael Bishop	Philip K. Dick is Dead, Alas	Grafton	
1989	Richard Grant	Rumours of Spring	Bantam UK	
1989	Gwyneth Jones	Kairos	Unwin Hyman	
1989	Lucius Shepard	Life During Wartime	Grafton	
1989	Ian Watson	Whores of Babylon	Grafton	
1990	Geoff Ryman*	The Child Garden	Unwin Hyman	
1990	Jonathan Carroll	A Child Across the Sky	Century Publishing	
1990	Lisa Goldstein	A Mask for the General	Arrow Books	
1990	Ian McDonald	Desolation Road	Bantam UK	
1990	Paul Park	Soldiers of Paradise	Grafton	
1990	Mike Resnick	Ivory	Century Publishing	
1990	David Zindell	Neverness	Grafton	
1991	Colin Greenland*	Take Back Plenty	Unwin Hyman	
1991	Mary Gentle	Rats and Gargoyles	Bantam UK	
1991	Iain M. Banks	Use of Weapons	Macdonald Publishing	
1991	Misha Nogha	Red Spider White Web	Morrigan Publications	
1991	K. W. Jeter	Farewell Horizontal	Grafton	
1991	Pat Murphy	The City, Not Long After	Pan Books	
1992	Pat Cadigan*	Synners	HarperCollins	
1992	Paul J. McAuley	Eternal Light	Victor Gollancz Ltd	
1992	Stephen Baxter	Raft	Grafton	
1992	Gwyneth Jones	White Queen	Victor Gollancz Ltd	
1992	Richard Paul Russo	Subterranean Gallery	Grafton	
1992	Dan Simmons	The Hyperion Cantos	Headline Publishing Group	
1993	Marge Piercy*	Body of Glass	Michael Joseph	
1993	Kim Stanley Robinson	Red Mars	HarperCollins UK	
1993	Ian McDonald	Hearts, Hands and Voices	Victor Gollancz Ltd	
1993	Richard Paul Russo	Destroying Angel	Headline Publishing Group	
1993	Michael Swanwick	Stations of the Tide	Legend Publishing	
1993	Sue Thomas	Correspondence	The Women's Press	
1993	Lisa Tuttle	Lost Futures	Grafton	
1993	Connie Willis	Doomsday Book	New English Library	
1994	Jeff Noon*	Vurt	Ringpull	
1994	John Barnes	A Million Open Doors	Millennium	
1994	Nicola Griffith	Ammonite	Grafton	
1994	Neal Stephenson	Snow Crash	Roc UK	
1994	Michael Swanwick	The Iron Dragon's Daughter	Millennium	
1994	David Zindell	The Broken God	HarperCollins UK	
1995	Pat Cadigan*	Fools	HarperCollins UK	
1995	John Barnes	Mother of Storms	Millennium	
1995	Gwyneth Jones	North Wind	Victor Gollancz Ltd	
1995	Paul J. McAuley	Pasquale's Angel	Victor Gollancz Ltd	
1995	James K. Morrow	Towing Jehovah	Arrow Books	
1995	Kristine Kathryn Rusch	Alien Influences	Millennium	
1996	Paul J. McAuley*	Fairyland	Victor Gollancz Ltd	
1996	Ken MacLeod	The Star Fraction	Legend Publishing	
1996	Patricia Anthony	Happy Policeman	New English Library	
1996	Stephen Baxter	The Time Ships	HarperCollins UK	
1996	Christopher Priest	The Prestige	Simon & Schuster UK	
1996	Neal Stephenson	The Diamond Age	Viking UK	
1997	Amitav Ghosh*	The Calcutta Chromosome	Picador	
1997	Stephen Baxter	Voyage	HarperCollins Voyager	
1997	Jack McDevitt	The Engines of God	HarperCollins Voyager	
1997	Kim Stanley Robinson	Blue Mars	HarperCollins Voyager	
1997	Sheri S. Tepper	Gibbon's Decline and Fall	HarperCollins Voyager	
1997	N. Lee Wood	Looking for the Mahdi	HarperCollins Voyager	
1998	Mary Doria Russell*	The Sparrow	Black Swan	
1998	Stephen Baxter	Titan	HarperCollins Voyager	
1998	Elizabeth Hand	Glimmering	HarperCollins Voyager	
1998	James Lovegrove	Days	Phoenix Books	
1998	Jeff Noon	Nymphomation	Doubleday	
1998	Sheri S. Tepper	The Family Tree	HarperCollins Voyager	
1999	Tricia Sullivan*	Dreaming in Smoke	Millenium	
1999	John Barnes	Earth Made of Glass	Orion Publishing Group	
1999	Peter Delacorte	Time on My Hands	Victor Gollancz Ltd	
1999	Ken MacLeod	The Cassini Division	Orbit Books	
1999	Christopher Priest	The Extremes	Simon & Schuster UK	
1999	Alison Sinclair	Cavalcade	Millennium	
2000	Bruce Sterling*	Distraction	Millennium	
2000	Stephen Baxter	Manifold: Time	HarperCollins Voyager	
2000	Kathleen Ann Goonan	The Bones of Time	HarperCollins Voyager	
2000	Justina Robson	Silver Screen	Macmillan UK	
2000	Neal Stephenson	Cryptonomicon	Heinemann	
2000	Vernor Vinge	A Deepness in the Sky	Millennium	
2001	China Miéville*	Perdido Street Station	Macmillan Publishers	
2001	Octavia E. Butler	Parable of the Talents	The Women's Press	
2001	Mary Gentle	Ash: A Secret History	Victor Gollancz Ltd	
2001	Ken MacLeod	Cosmonaut Keep	Orbit Books	
2001	Alastair Reynolds	Revelation Space	Victor Gollancz Ltd	
2001	Adam Roberts	Salt	Victor Gollancz Ltd	
2002	Gwyneth Jones*	Bold As Love	Victor Gollancz Ltd	
2002	Jon Courtenay Grimwood	Pashazade	Earthlight	
2002	Peter F. Hamilton	Fallen Dragon	Macmillan Publishers	
2002	Paul J. McAuley	The Secret of Life	HarperCollins Voyager	
2002	Justina Robson	Mappa Mundi	Macmillan Publishers	
2002	Connie Willis	Passage	HarperCollins Voyager	
2003	Christopher Priest*	The Separation	Scribner UK	
2003	David Brin	Kiln People	Orbit Books	
2003	M. John Harrison	Light	Victor Gollancz Ltd	
2003	China Miéville	The Scar	Macmillan Publishers	
2003	Elizabeth Moon	Speed of Dark	Orbit Books	
2003	Kim Stanley Robinson	The Years of Rice and Salt	HarperCollins	
2004	Neal Stephenson*	Quicksilver	Heinemann	
2004	Stephen Baxter	Coalescent	Victor Gollancz Ltd	
2004	Greg Bear	Darwin's Children	HarperCollins UK	
2004	William Gibson	Pattern Recognition	Viking Press	
2004	Gwyneth Jones	Midnight Lamp	Victor Gollancz Ltd	
2004	Tricia Sullivan	Maul	Orbit Books	
2005	China Miéville*	Iron Council	Macmillan Publishers	
2005	Ian McDonald	River of Gods	Simon & Schuster	
2005	David Mitchell	Cloud Atlas	Sceptre	
2005	Richard K. Morgan	Market Forces	Victor Gollancz Ltd	
2005	Audrey Niffenegger	The Time Traveler's Wife	Jonathan Cape	
2005	Neal Stephenson	The System of the World	Heinemann	
2006	Geoff Ryman*	Air	Victor Gollancz Ltd	
2006	Ken MacLeod	Learning the World	Orbit Books	
2006	Alastair Reynolds	Pushing Ice	Victor Gollancz Ltd	
2006	Kazuo Ishiguro	Never Let Me Go	Faber and Faber	
2006	Charles Stross	Accelerando	Orbit Books	
2006	Liz Williams	Banner of Souls	Tor UK	
2007	M. John Harrison*	Nova Swing	Victor Gollancz Ltd	
2007	Jon Courtenay Grimwood	End of the World Blues	Victor Gollancz Ltd	
2007	Lydia Millet	Oh Pure and Radiant Heart	Heinemann	
2007	Jan Morris	Hav	Faber and Faber	
2007	Adam Roberts	Gradisil	Victor Gollancz Ltd	
2007	Brian Stableford	Streaking	PS Publishing	
2008	Richard K. Morgan*	Black Man	Victor Gollancz Ltd	
2008	Matthew de Abaitua	The Red Men	Snowbooks	
2008	Sarah Hall	The Carhullan Army	Faber and Faber	
2008	Steven Hall	The Raw Shark Texts	Canongate Books	
2008	Ken MacLeod	The Execution Channel	Orbit Books	
2008	Stephen Baxter	The H-Bomb Girl	Faber and Faber	
2009	Ian R. MacLeod*	Song of Time	PS Publishing	
2009	Paul J. McAuley	The Quiet War	Victor Gollancz Ltd	
2009	Alastair Reynolds	House of Suns	Victor Gollancz Ltd	
2009	Neal Stephenson	Anathem	Atlantic Books	
2009	Sheri S. Tepper	The Margarets	HarperCollins	
2009	Mark Wernham	Martin Martin's on the Other Side	Jonathan Cape	
2010	China Miéville*	The City & the City	Macmillan Publishers	
2010	Gwyneth Jones	Spirit: The Princess of Bois Dormant	Victor Gollancz Ltd	
2010	Adam Roberts	Yellow Blue Tibia	Victor Gollancz Ltd	
2010	Kim Stanley Robinson	Galileo's Dream	HarperCollins	
2010	Marcel Theroux	Far North	Faber and Faber	
2010	Chris Wooding	Retribution Falls	Victor Gollancz Ltd	
2011	Lauren Beukes*	Zoo City	Angry Robot	
2011	Patrick Ness	Monsters of Men	Walker Books	
2011	Ian McDonald	The Dervish House	Victor Gollancz Ltd	
2011	Richard Powers	Generosity: An Enhancement	Atlantic Books	
2011	Tim Powers	Declare	Corvus Books	
2011	Tricia Sullivan	Lightborn	Orbit Books	
2012	Jane Rogers*	The Testament of Jessie Lamb	Sandstone Press	
2012	Greg Bear	Hull Zero Three	Victor Gollancz Ltd	
2012	Drew Magary	The End Specialist	HarperCollins Voyager	
2012	China Miéville	Embassytown	Macmillan Publishers	
2012	Charles Stross	Rule 34	Orbit Books	
2012	Sheri S. Tepper	The Waters Rising	Victor Gollancz Ltd	
2013	Chris Beckett*	Dark Eden	Corvus	
2013	Kim Stanley Robinson	2312	Orbit Books	
2013	Nick Harkaway	Angelmaker	Heinemann	
2013	Peter Heller	The Dog Stars	Headline Publishing Group	
2013	Ken MacLeod	Intrusion	Orbit Books	
2013	Adrian Barnes	Nod	Bluemoose Books	
2014	Ann Leckie*	Ancillary Justice	Orbit Books	
2014	Kameron Hurley	God's War	Del Rey Books	
2014	Phillip Mann	The Disestablishment of Paradise	Victor Gollancz Ltd	
2014	Ramez Naam	Nexus	Angry Robot	
2014	Christopher Priest	The Adjacent	Victor Gollancz Ltd	
2014	James Smythe	The Machine	Blue Door	
2015	Emily St. John Mandel*	Station Eleven	Picador	
2015	Michel Faber	The Book of Strange New Things	Canongate Books	
2015	Dave Hutchinson	Europe in Autumn	Solaris Books	
2015	Claire North	The First Fifteen Lives of Harry August	Orbit Books	
2015	M. R. Carey	The Girl with All the Gifts	Orbit Books	
2015	Emmi Itäranta	Memory of Water	HarperVoyager	
2016	Adrian Tchaikovsky*	Children of Time	Tor Books	
2016	Becky Chambers	The Long Way to a Small, Angry Planet	Hodder & Stoughton	
2016	Dave Hutchinson	Europe at Midnight	Solaris Books	
2016	Nnedi Okorafor	The Book of Phoenix	Hodder & Stoughton	
2016	Iain Pears	Arcadia	Faber and Faber	
2016	James Smythe	Way Down Dark	Hodder & Stoughton	
2017	Colson Whitehead*	The Underground Railroad	Fleet Publishing	
2017	Becky Chambers	A Closed and Common Orbit	Hodder & Stoughton	
2017	Yoon Ha Lee	Ninefox Gambit	Solaris Books	
2017	Emma Newman	After Atlas	Roc Books	
2017	Tricia Sullivan	Occupy Me	Gollancz Books	
2017	Lavie Tidhar	Central Station	PS Publishing	
2018	Anne Charnock*	Dreams Before the Start of Time	47North	
2018	Omar El Akkad	American War	Picador	
2018	Jeff VanderMeer	Borne	Fourth Estate	
2018	Jennie Melamed	Gather the Daughters	Tinder Press	
2018	C. Robert Cargill	Sea of Rust	Gollancz Books	
2018	Jaroslav Kalfar	Spaceman of Bohemia	Sceptre	
2019	Tade Thompson*	Rosewater	Orbit Books	
2019	Sue Burke	Semiosis	HarperVoyager	
2019	Yoon Ha Lee	Revenant Gun	Solaris Books	
2019	Ahmed Saadawi	Frankenstein in Baghdad	Oneworld Publications	
2019	Simon Stålenhag	The Electric State	Simon and Schuster	
2019	Aliya Whiteley	The Loosening Skin	Unsung Stories	
2020	Namwali Serpell*	The Old Drift	Hogarth Press	
2020	Adrian Tchaikovsky	Cage of Souls	Head of Zeus	
2020	Charlie Jane Anders	The City in the Middle of the Night	Tor Books, Titan Books	
2020	David Wellington	The Last Astronaut	Hachette	
2020	Kameron Hurley	The Light Brigade	Saga Press, Angry Robot	
2020	Arkady Martine	A Memory Called Empire	Tor Books	
2021	Laura Jean McKay*	The Animals in That Country	Scribe	
2021	Patience Agbabi	The Infinite	Canongate Books	
2021	Simon Jimenez	The Vanished Birds	Titan Books	
2021	Hao Jingfang	Vagabonds	Head of Zeus	
2021	RB Kelly	Edge of Heaven	NewCon Press	
2021	Valerie Valdes	Chilling Effect	Orbit Books	
2022	Harry Josephine Giles*	Deep Wheel Orcadia	Picador	
2022	Arkady Martine	A Desolation Called Peace	Tor UK	
2022	Kazuo Ishiguro	Klara and the Sun	Faber and Faber	
2022	Courttia Newland	A River Called Time	Canongate Books	
2022	Aliya Whiteley	Skyward Inn	Solaris Books	
2022	Mercurio D. Rivera	Wergen: The Alien Love War	NewCon Press	
2023	Ned Beauman*	Venomous Lumpsucker	Hodder & Stoughton	
2023	E. J. Swift	The Coral Bones	Unsung Stories	
2023	Tom Watson	Metronome	Bloomsbury	
2023	Hervé Le Tellier	The Anomaly	Michael Joseph	
2023	Aliette de Bodard	The Red Scholar's Wake	Gollancz Books	
2023	Lucy Kissick	Plutoshine	Gollancz Books	
2024	Martin MacInnes*	In Ascension	Atlantic Books	
2024	Nana Kwame Adjei-Brenyah	Chain-Gang All-Stars	Harvill Secker	
2024	Isabel Waidner	Corey Fah Does Social Mobility	Hamish Hamilton	
2024	Ray Nayler	The Mountain in the Sea	Weidenfeld & Nicolson	
2024	Emily Tesh	Some Desperate Glory	Orbit Books	
2024	Lavanya Lakshminarayan	The Ten Percent Thief	Solaris Books	
2025	Sierra Greer*	Annie Bot	The Borough Press	
2025	Ian Green	Extremophile	Head of Zeus	
2025	Kaliane Bradley	The Ministry of Time	Sceptre	
2025	Julia Armfield	Private Rites	Fourth Estate	
2025	Adrian Tchaikovsky	Service Model	Tor Books	
2025	Maud Woolf	Thirteen Ways to Kill Lulabelle Rock	Angry Robot	
2026	E. J. Swift*	When There Are Wolves Again	Arcadia	
2026	Matt Dinniman	Dungeon Crawler Carl	Michael Joseph	
2026	Laila Lalami	The Dream Hotel	Bloomsbury Circus	
2026	Silvia Park	Luminous	Magpie	
2026	qntm	There Is No Antimemetics Division	Del Rey	
2026	Lorraine Wilson	The Salt Oracle	Solaris	
