= Caragh (disambiguation) =

Caragh may refer to:

- Caragh, County Kildare, hamlet in Ireland
  - Caragh GAA, based in Prosperous, near Caragh, County Kildare
- Caragh River, County Kerry, Ireland
  - Caragh Lake, on the river
- Caragh Donley, American writer and television producer
- Caragh M. O'Brien, author of the Birthmarked young-adult books

== See also ==
- Cara (disambiguation)
- Carra (disambiguation)
