= Steven Hall (author) =

British author

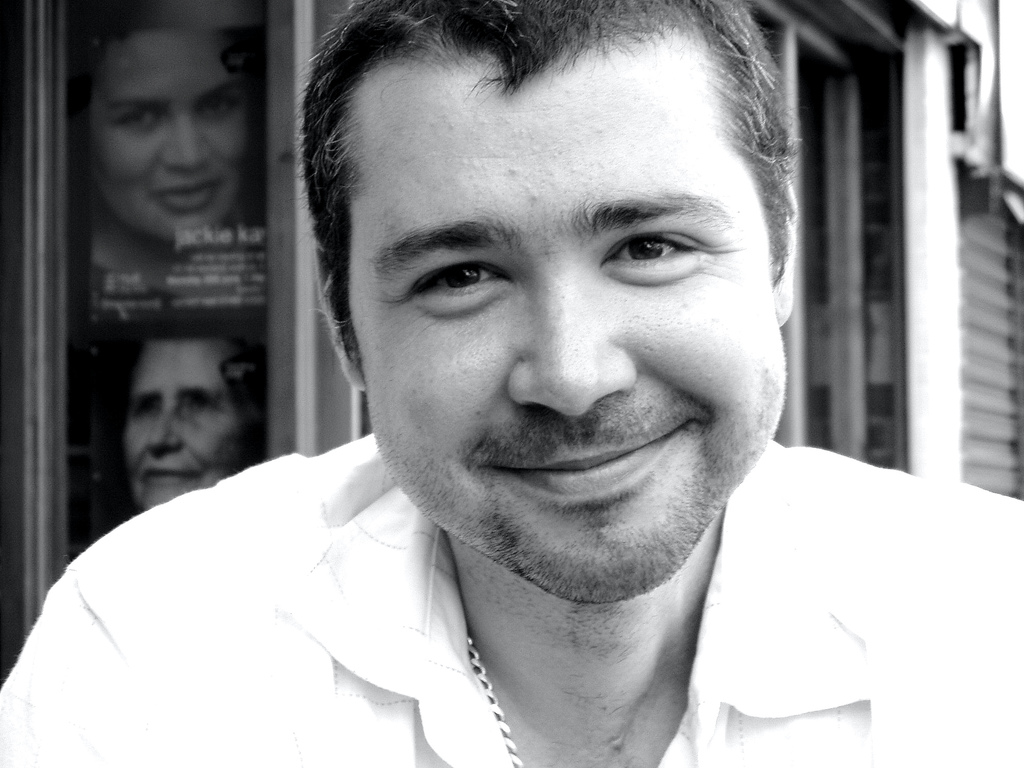
- Steven Hall at the "Humber Mouth" Hull literature festival 2006
- Born: 1975 (age 50–51); Derbyshire, England
- Occupation: Writer

Steven Hall (born 1975 in Derbyshire) is a British writer. He is the author of The Raw Shark Texts, lead writer of the video game Battlefield 1, and writer on Nike's World Cup short film The Last Game.

His debut novel, The Raw Shark Texts won the 2008 Somerset Maugham Award and a 2007 Borders Original Voices Award, and was shortlisted for the 2008 Arthur C. Clarke Award. The book has been translated into 29 different languages, and a screenplay for a film adaptation has been written by Simon Beaufoy (Slumdog Millionaire).

Hall has written for Granta Magazine and Lonely Planet. He has also written scripts for Doctor Who radio dramas and was the lead writer for the video games Crysis 3, Ryse: Son of Rome, Battlefield 1, and Battlefield V.

In 2007, Hall was named as one of Waterstone's "25 Authors for the Future". In 2010, Hall was named as one of the best 20 novelists under 40 by The Daily Telegraph. In 2013, Hall was named as one of Granta′s Best of Young British Novelists 2013 out of 20 novelists listed in total.

== Works ==
=== Novels ===
- The Raw Shark Texts (2007)
- Maxwell's Demon (2021)

=== Short stories ===
- "Stories for a Phone Book," in New Writing 13 (2005)
- "Ten Tickets," in "A Couple of Stops (Light Transit)" (2006)
- "What I Think About When I Think About Robots," in Granta 109: Work (2010)
- "The End of Endings," in Granta 123: Best of Young British Novelists 4 (2013)

=== Computer games ===
- Crysis 3 (2013)
- Ryse: Son of Rome (2013)
- Battlefield 1 (2016)
- Battlefield V (2018)

=== Radio plays ===
- "The Word Lord," in Doctor Who: Forty-Five (2008)
- Doctor Who: A Death in the Family (2010)

=== Advertising ===
- The Last Game for Nike (2014)

== Awards and prizes ==
- Waterstones 25 authors for the Future (2007)
- Borders Original Voices Award (2007) for The Raw Shark Texts
- Somerset Maugham Award (2008) for The Raw Shark Texts
- Granta Best of Young British Novelists (2013)
