= Pashazade =

Pashazade may refer to:

- An Ottoman form of address or epithet, meaning 'son of a Pasha'
- Pashazade, the first novel in the Arabesk trilogy by Jon Courtenay Grimwood
