= Fishy =

Fishy may refer to:

- Fishy, a film written and directed by Maria Blom
- Fishy, a 2006 short film by Steve Koren
- Aunt Fishy, a character in the 2015 American film Love the Coopers
- Fishy, a character in the 2010 novel Boxer, Beetle by British author Ned Beauman
- "Fishy", a 2000 single by Lithuanian pop band SKAMP
- Fishy Pete, a character in the supernatural crime comic book series The Goon

== See also ==
- "Fishies", a track from the 2007 album So Many Nights by The Cat Empire
- Fish
