= RedRobe =

2000 novel by Jon Courtenay Grimwood

redRobe
- First edition cover
- Author: Jon Courtenay Grimwood
- Language: English
- Genre: Speculative fiction
- Publisher: Victor Gollancz Ltd
- Publication date: October 2005
- Publication place: United Kingdom
- Media type: Print (Hardcover)
- ISBN: 0-671-02260-1 (first edition, paperback)
- OCLC: 42875998

redRobe is a 2000 novel by Jon Courtenay Grimwood. Details in the text suggest that it is set in the same world as that of his earlier speculative fiction novels neoAddix, Lucifer's Dragon and reMix, and like them it is also an SF thriller.

== Plot summary ==
The book opens in Mexico City in the future, where sometime assassin Axl Borja is about to try to make one last hit, which goes drastically wrong when he takes three rounds to do the job. Losing his gun in the process, he is caught by the police, and throws himself on the mercy of the Cardinal Santo Duque - his former boss, a minister of the Vatican, and someone given to unusual methods of revenge. The Cardinal agrees to grant clemency if Axl returns to his service, an offer he can't refuse but one with serious consequences.

Axl's mission is to track down the late Pope Joan (specifically, a data-holding bracelet of hers), who drained the Vatican's immense assets to buy aid and other kinds of support for the Third World before being apparently dismembered by a horde of the people she helped save. The Cardinal is interested in tracking down what remains of his organisation's money, but there's one problem; the only lead is in space, on the refugee-only space habitat Samsara. As a man responsible for much of the ringworld's population, the Cardinal can't send an agent officially, so he tortures and seriously injures Axl - fitting a ceramic neural-interface port into his head, removing both his eyes, and running him through a set of SQUID probes designed to pillage what's left of his memories.

Axl's gun, a mostly-sentient Colt armed with explosive flechettes, incendiary phosphorus rounds, and all-purpose ceramic smart rounds and capable of full battlefield analysis and giving tactical advice when needed, has since changed hands a number of times, from a pimp to a gutter-boy to a voodoo priest to a cleric to the Cardinal himself. With his assistance its AI is uploaded to the networks and thus to Samsara, where it has to earn the favour of resident AI Tsongkhapa if it can help Axl in his mission.

One of the most interesting features of the book is its soundtrack. Axl has a Korg music synthesiser implanted in his brain, capable of generating pretty much any kind of music, precisely tuned to what he experiences; it will create heavy basslines and drum 'n' bass music to go with a gunfight, for instance, while going completely silent in moments of great suspense and working out signature riffs for people Axl meets. This device, inactive at the start of the book, is fixed about halfway through and is used to add a sense of pacing to the action scenes towards the novel's end.

Another recurring theme is battlefield medicine, reminiscent of the use of superglue in the Vietnam War. Axl's eyesockets are filled, first by a "plug-and-play" Red Cross-issue eye, so cheap it only works in black and white and very low-res; and later by a more complex eyeball capable of night-vision and with a digital counter in the corner to remind him of his deadline.
