= Jon Courtenay Grimwood =

Maltese-born British science fiction and fantasy author

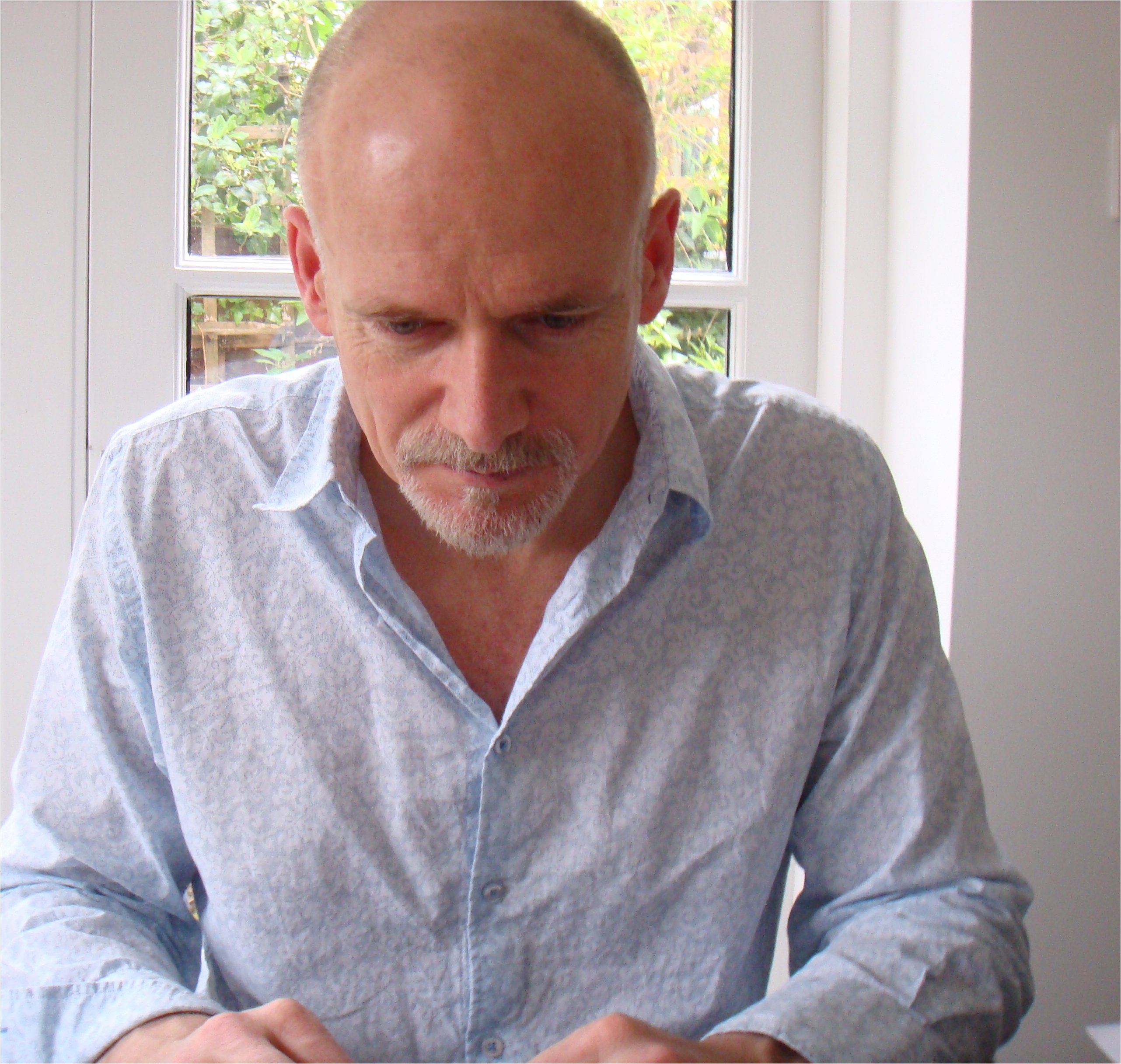
- Photograph of author taken by his partner Sam Baker, 2009.
- Born: 1953 (age 72–73); Valletta, Malta
- Education: Kingston University University of St Andrews
- Occupation: Writer
- Writing career
- Pen name: Jonathan Grimwood; Jack Grimwood
- Period: 1990s–present
- Genres: Science fiction, fantasy, literary fiction & thrillers
- Website: j-cg.co.uk jonathangrimwood.com jackgrimwood.com

Jon Courtenay Grimwood (born 1953 in Valletta, Malta) is a Maltese-born British science fiction and fantasy author. He also writes literary fiction as Jonathan Grimwood, and crime fiction and thrillers as Jack Grimwood.

== Biography ==
Grimwood was born in Valletta, Malta, grew up in Malta, Britain, Southeast Asia and Norway in the 1960s and 1970s. He studied at Kingston University, then worked in publishing and as a freelance writer for magazines and newspapers including The Guardian, The Daily Telegraph, The Times, and The Independent. He recently finished writing Swimming to the Moon, a memoir of his childhood; and in July 2025 graduated with a PhD from the School of English at the University of St Andrews, he lives in Edinburgh, Scotland, and is married to the journalist and novelist Sam Baker, with a son, Jamie, from a previous marriage.

In May 2026, Simon Taylor, editorial director at Transworld, preemptively bought two 'JCG' historical fantasies in a world rights deal. The first, Thrones & Powers, which builds of John Milton's War in Heaven, is due in Spring 2028.

Much of Grimwood's early work within SF&F has been described as post-cyberpunk. His fourth book is loosely based on Stanley Weyman's Victorian novel Under the Red Robe. He won a British Science Fiction Association (BFSA) award for Felaheen in 2003, was short-listed for the Arthur C. Clarke Award for Pashazade the year before, and won the 2006 BSFA award for Best Novel with End of the World Blues. He was short-listed for the John W. Campbell Memorial Award in 2002 for Pashazade. End of the World Blues was also short-listed for the 2007 Arthur C. Clarke Award. The following were nominated in the SF novel category in the Locus Awards – Felaheen, The Third Arabesk (2004); Stamping Butterflies (2005); 9Tail Fox (2006); End of the World Blues (2007).

The French translation of his 2013 literary novel The Last Banquet, written as Jonathan Grimwood, was shortlisted in January 2015 for Le Prix Montesquieu, as Le Dernier Banquet, 2014, Éditions Terra Nova, translation by Carole Delporte.

Grimwood's SF&F work tends to be of a quasi-alternate history genre. In the first four novels, set in the 22nd century, the point of divergence is the Franco-Prussian War of 1870, where Grimwood posits a reality where Napoleon III's France defeats Otto von Bismarck's Prussia, causing the German Empire never to form and the Second French Empire never to collapse. In the Arabesk trilogy, the point of divergence is in 1914, with Woodrow Wilson brokering an earlier peace so that World War I never expanded outside of the Balkans; the books are set in a liberal Islamic Ottoman North Africa in the 21st century, mainly centring on El Iskandriya (Alexandria). By contrast, there is little in Stamping Butterflies, 9tail Fox or End of the World Blues to suggest that the books are not set in our reality.

The Fallen Blade is the first of three novels set in an alternative early-15th century featuring Tycho, fallen angel and assassin, at the Venetian court, in a Venice where Marco Polo's family have been hereditary dukes for five generations and the Mongol emperor Tamberlaine has conquered China, making him the most powerful ruler in the world. The second novel in the Assassini series, The Outcast Blade was published in 2012, with the third The Exiled Blade published 2013. The novels take as a template sequences and tropes from Shakespeare's plays Othello, Hamlet and Romeo and Juliet. The novels have been sold into a number of languages.

His first literary novel, The Last Banquet, as Jonathan Grimwood, was published in 2013 by Canongate Books in the UK, Europa Editions in the US, and Éditions Terra Nova in France, among others. Referencing Benjamin Franklin, Voltaire and the Marquis de Sade — and picaresque in the style of Candide — it tells the semi magic realist tale of an aristocrat prepared to eat anything, and covers the run up to the French Revolution from the early to late 18th century. The French France 5 critic Gérard Collard called Le Dernier Banquet "le livre de l’année" (the book of the year). It was an NPR Best Book of the Year for 2013 "Foodies and Francophiles alike will relish this debut novel about Jean-Marie d'Aumout, whom we first meet crunching beetles as a starving orphaned son of nobility in 1723...". In January 2015, it was shortlisted for Le Prix Montesquieu. The book was also nominated for the Bad Sex Awards for a scene involving Brie and breast milk.

As Jack Grimwood, he writes thrillers for Penguin Books. The first, Moskva, Spring 2016, is set in 1980s Soviet Moscow. The second, Nightfall Berlin, was published in May 2018.

2021's Island Reich, the first stand-alone novel written as Jack Grimwood, mixes the story of the fictional safe cracker and conman Bill O'Hagan, with the Battle of France in June 1940, the German occupation of the Channel Islands, the Duke of Windsor's exile in Portugal and Operation Willi, the supposed Nazi plot to kidnap the duke and return him to the British throne as a puppet monarch.

Arctic Sun, the third Tom Fox novel, was published in 2023.

Grimwood was guest of honour at Novacon in 2003, at Kontext (in Uppsala, Sweden) in 2008, at Eastercon LX (the 60th British National Science Fiction Convention) in 2009, and at Bristolcon in 2014.

He was a judge for the 2010 Arthur C. Clarke Award presented to China Miéville for The City & the City; and for the 2011 award presented to Lauren Beukes for Zoo City. He also judged The James White Award given at Eastercon 2012.

== Novels ==
Name	Published	ISBN	Notes
neoAddix	1997	ISBN 0-340-67472-5	
Lucifer's Dragon	1998	ISBN 0-7434-7827-4	
reMix	1999	ISBN 0-671-02222-9	
redRobe	2000	ISBN 0-671-02260-1	British Science Fiction Award nominee, 2000
Pashazade	2001	ISBN 0-7434-6833-3	First in the Arabesk trilogy British Science Fiction Award nominee, 2001; John W. Campbell Memorial Award nominee, 2002; Arthur C. Clarke Award shortlisted, 2002
Effendi	2002	ISBN 0-671-77369-0	Second in the Arabesk trilogy British Science Fiction Award nominee, 2002
Felaheen	2003	ISBN 0-671-77370-4	Third in the Arabesk trilogy British Science Fiction Award winner, 2003; British Fantasy Award nominee, 2004
Stamping Butterflies	2004	ISBN 0-575-07613-5	British Science Fiction Award nominee, 2004
9tail Fox	2005	ISBN 0-575-07615-1	British Science Fiction Award nominee, 2005; Best Novel, Vector 2006
End of the World Blues	2006	ISBN 0-575-07616-X	British Science Fiction Award winner, 2006; Arthur C. Clarke Award shortlisted, 2007
The Fallen Blade	2011	ISBN 0-316-07439-X	First in the Assassini trilogy
The Outcast Blade	2012	ISBN 1841498475	Second in the Assassini trilogy
The Exiled Blade	2013	ISBN 9781841498508	Third in the Assassini trilogy
The Last Banquet	2013	ISBN 1-4448-2021-4	As Jonathan Grimwood shortlisted for Le Prix Montesquieu. 2015
Moskva	2016	ISBN 0-7181-8155-7	As Jack Grimwood
Nightfall Berlin	2018	ISBN 978-0-7181-8157-4	As Jack Grimwood
Island Reich	2021	ISBN 978-0-2413-4831-4	As Jack Grimwood
Arctic Sun	2023	ISBN 978-0-2413-4833-8	As Jack Grimwood
