= Interference (novel) =

2019 science fiction novel by Sue Burke

- First edition cover
- Author: Sue Burke
- Cover artist: Jeff Rotman
- Language: English
- Series: Semiosis Trilogy
- Genre: Science fiction
- Publisher: Tor Books
- Publication date: October 22, 2019
- Publication place: United States
- Media type: Hardback
- Pages: 318
- ISBN: 978-1-250-31784-1
- Preceded by: Semiosis
- Followed by: Usurpation

Interference is a 2019 science fiction novel by American writer and translator Sue Burke. It is the second novel of her Semiosis Trilogy series, the first being Semiosis (2018). Interference was first published in October 2019 in the United States by Tor Books. The novel takes place on the planet Pax about 100 years after the events in Semiosis when a new expedition from Earth arrives.

== Plot summary ==
About a hundred years after the events in Semiosis, a new expedition to Pax from Earth is launched. Contact with the Pax colonists had been lost soon after they landed on the planet. On Pax the new arrivals find descendants of the original colonists living side-by-side in a glass city with alien arthropod-like Glassmakers, and Stevland, a sentient rainbow bamboo. Stevland oversees a fragile peace between the Pax humans and the Glassmakers. The Earthlings, as the new arrivals are called, interfere with this delicate balance, causing divisions in the colony and amongst themselves.

The Earthlings partake in an expedition with the Pax humans and Glassmakers to explore the plains surrounding the city. There they discover colonies of sentient corals who begin infiltrating the city's territory. The Earthlings, the Pax humans and the Glassmakers put aside their differences and unite with Stevland to fight the corals. Stevland takes remote control of one of the Earthling's heli-planes using their radio network and destroys the corals.

Once calm is restored to the city, most of the Earthlings return home with specimens of Pax's fauna and flora, including some of Stevland's seeds. The seeds are planted on Earth and grow into a young rainbow bamboo named Levanter, who becomes aware of his sentience and soon learns how to exploit it.

== Background ==
Burke said in an interview that ideas for Interference came to her while she was writing Semiosis. Earth would want to know the fate of the mission to Pax, and she considered what impact a new mission to the planet would have on the original colonists. She also felt that the vast unexplored regions of Pax needed to be visited. Burke added that she wanted Stevland to have "an existential foe", but who or what that foe would be changed as she progressed with the novel.

When asked if there were any books that were a source of inspiration for Interference, Burke cited Manuel Lacarta's biography of Lope de Aguirre, Lope de Aguirre: el loco del Amazonas, the Spanish conquistador sent down the Amazon River to locate the mythical El Dorado. She said David Attenborough's documentary series, The Private Life of Plants also influenced many aspects of both Semiosis and Interference.

== Reception ==
Reviewing Interference in SFRevu, Ernest Lilley called the book "as good" and "thought-provoking" as Semiosis. He opined that the book's linear timeline, as opposed to the previous book's generation-hopping, tells each major character's story in "a more satisfying way". Lilley said that while Interference "wrap[s] up the [duology] fairly well", the book's Epilogue opens up the possibility of more stories to come. David Walton wrote in New York Journal of Books that Interference is, like its predecessor, "a rich and engaging exploration of different forms of intelligent life". He stated that Stevland is "much more sympathetic and likeable" than any of the other characters, and "carries this novel". Walton found the book's conclusion "satisfying", and added that he would like to see more from Burke about Stevland and others like him.

In a review of Interference in Locus, Adrienne Martini said that genetics and their role in a species' survival are central to Burke's writing, and when she dwells on the nature versus nurture question, her stories are "gripping". Martini was impressed by Stevland and his manipulation of the creatures around him for his own benefit, but felt that many of Burke's other characters tended to be "emotionally opaque". Martini concluded that Interference "doesn't quite set an inviting table", although it has "a lot of thoughts to chew on". Tadiana Jones was a little more critical of the book in a review in Fantasy Literature. She said that Burke keeps switching the point of view from one character to the next, which does not give the reader an opportunity to become attached to any of them. Jones added that while Pax is an intriguing planet and the book successfully conveys the dangers the characters face, she felt that Burke's prose is "merely serviceable". Jones gave Interference 3/5 stars.

== Works cited ==
- Burke, Sue (2019). Interference (e-book ed.). New York City: Tor Books. ISBN 978-1-250-31782-7.
