= Skyward Inn =

2021 sci-fi novel by Aliya Whiteley

- First edition cover
- Author: Aliya Whiteley
- Cover artist: Dominic Forbes
- Language: English
- Genres: Science fiction
- Publisher: Solaris
- Publication date: 16 March 2021
- Publication place: United Kingdom
- Media type: Hardcover
- Pages: 336
- ISBN: 978-1-78108-882-1

Skyward Inn is a 2021 science fiction novel by British writer Aliya Whiteley. The novel was a finalist for the 2021 BSFA Award for Best Novel and Arthur C. Clarke Award, as well as being named one of the five best science fiction novels of the year by the Financial Times.

== Summary ==
The novel follows the stories of Jem and Isley, two veterans who served on opposite sides of the human invasion of the planet Qita, where the native inhabitants surrendered immediately. The two now run an inn in the isolated Western Protectorate.

== Publishing history ==
Whiteley has stated that the idea behind the novel was inspired by a radio documentary she heard while driving about a Scottish man who moved to Japan to start a pub. She has further stated that the novel was influenced by Angela Carter and Daphne du Maurier.

== Reception ==
Beret Petersen of SciFiNow said that the book explored "themes of loneliness and isolation," calling it a "startling study on the impact of colonial and imperialist attitudes and actions." Kibby Robinson of The Nerd Daily said the novel "crafts an atmosphere of creeping uncertainty and strangeness that will follow readers past its pages" and "ultimately boils down to an intimate story of identity, belonging, and fractured relationships." Lisa Tuttle of The Guardian described the book as combining "an intriguing, character-driven plot with great splashes of science fictional weirdness," saying that it "feels like an instant classic of the genre."
