= E. J. Swift =

UK author of speculative fiction

E.J. Swift
- Occupation: Author
- Writing career
- Subject: Speculative fiction
- Notable work: When There Are Wolves Again
- Notable awards: Arthur C. Clarke Award; 2026 When There Are Wolves Again
- Website: ejswift.co.uk

E. J. Swift is a British author of speculative fiction, based in London, UK. She writes novels and short fiction, and her 2025 novel When There Are Wolves Again won the Arthur C. Clarke Award for science fiction in 2026.

== Education ==
Swift attended the University of Manchester, where she studied English and American Literature, following which she attended Royal Holloway, University of London, to complete her MA in Creative Writing.

== Career ==
Swift's short fiction has appeared in several anthologies, including The Endling Market in both The Best of British Science Fiction in 2017, and 2084: A Science Fiction Anthology in 2017. The Spiders of Stockholm appeared in both Irregularity in 2014, and the small press Jurassic London's last anthology The Extinction Event in 2016.

In 2012, Swift published her debut novel Osiris, the first in The Osiris Project trilogy, with the manuscript having been originally completed shortly after finishing her MA in Creative Writing, but before finding an agent and publisher. Osiris is written four hundred years in the future, and deals with themes of inequality a world affected by climate catastrophe, which Niall Harrison of the Los Angeles Review of Books described as echoing Julie Bertagna's Exodus. Osiris was followed by Cataveiro in 2014 and Tamaruq in 2015.

Paris Adrift, published in 2018, deals with time travel and an attempt to prevent the world from ending in 2070. The setting was influenced by Swift's experience of having lived in the Montmartre area of Paris.

The Coral Bones was published in 2022, and was followed by When There Are Wolves Again in 2025, which Swift has described as "sister novels", with both addressing issues of climate breakdown.

=== Climate themes ===
The climate crisis and climate breakdown are recurrent themes in Swift's writing, with the author having become more aware of climate issues whilst at university. Chelsea Haith, in the podcast Narrative Futures, based at the University of Oxford, has used the term "climate fiction" to describe Swift's work. Her first novel, Osiris is set in a post-apocalyptic world, fifty years after climate breakdown causes the earth to be flooded. In a review for Library Journal, Jackie Cassada praised the work for its "brilliant near-future vision of an ecologically and socially devastated world."

Both The Coral Bones and When There Are Wolves Again address issues of climate breakdown, but as companion novels, where the first looks at a failure to adapt to the climate crisis, and the second exploring a more successful engagement with Climate change adaptation. In an interview with the Chartered Institution of Water and Environmental Management's magazine The Environment, interviewer Jo Caird characterised the latter novel as "shifting into a more hopeful mode." In an interview with Paul March-Russell at the 2025 joint AGM of the British Science Fiction Association and the Science Fiction Foundation, Swift said that she hoped that the novel would "contribute to more hopeful narratives around climate change and green, sustainable futures."

When There Are Wolves Again discusses rewilding, and her research for When There Are Wolves Again including visiting the Cairngorms, and the Knepp Rewilding Estate. Swift has stated that the inspiration for her 2017 short story The White Fox and the Red was a photograph from a Wildlife Photographer of the Year finalist.

== Awards and recognition ==
When There Are Wolves Again was awarded Arthur C Clarke Award for Science Fiction in 2026, with Tom Hunter, award director, calling it "an ambitious study in the power of long-term hope in the face of climate breakdown." The novel also won the British Science Fiction Association award for Best Novel in 2025, and was named one of The Guardian's best science fiction books in 2025.

The Coral Bones was shortlisted for both the Arthur C Clarke Award in 2023, and the British Science Fiction Association's Best Novel award in 2022.

The short story Saga's Children, published in the 2013 anthology The Lowest Heaven was shortlisted for Best Short Fiction by the British Science Fiction Association's 2013 awards, and The Spiders of Stockholm, published in the 2014 anthology Irregularity, was placed on the longlist for the Sunday Times EFG Short Story Award in 2015.

== Bibliography ==
=== Selected Short fiction ===
- Saga's Children (2013)
- The Spiders of Stockholm (2014)
- The White Fox and the Red (2017)

=== Novels ===
- The Osiris Project (trilogy)
  - Osiris (2012)
  - Cataveiro (2014)
  - Tamaruq (2015)
- Paris Adrift (2018)
- The Coral Bones (2022)
- When There Are Wolves Again (2025)
