= The First Fifteen Lives of Harry August =

2014 novel by Catherine Webb

- First UK edition
- Author: Claire North
- Audio read by: Peter Kenny
- Cover artist: Sophie Burdess (pictured)
- Language: English
- Genre: Science fiction / fantasy
- Publisher: Orbit Books (UK); Redhook Books (US)
- Publication date: 8 April 2014
- Publication place: United Kingdom
- Media type: print
- Pages: 416 (UK), 405 (US)
- Awards: John W. Campbell Memorial Award
- ISBN: 0-356-50257-0

The First Fifteen Lives of Harry August is a novel by Claire North, a pseudonym of British author Catherine Webb, published in April 2014. It won the John W. Campbell Memorial Award for Best Science Fiction Novel, was nominated for the Arthur C. Clarke Award for Best Science Fiction Novel and the BSFA Award for Best Novel, and was featured in both the Richard and Judy Book Club and the BBC Radio 2 Book Club.

As of 2020, a film adaptation directed by Wes Ball is in the works.

== Plot ==
Harry August is born in the women's washroom of Berwick-upon-Tweed station in 1919, leads an unremarkable life, and dies in hospital in Newcastle upon Tyne in 1989. He then finds himself born again back in 1919 in the same circumstances, gaining the knowledge of his earlier life at an early age. He learns he is an Ouroboran or Kalachakra and is destined to be reborn again and again. He is not alone and is soon contacted by the Cronus Club, an organization of similarly affected members, who look after him in childhood in subsequent lives.

In later lives, Harry studies biology, chemistry, and physics. With knowledge from previous lives, he easily becomes a professor of physics at the University of Cambridge, where he meets an intelligent undergraduate student named Vincent Rankis. Vincent and Harry become friends as they talk about theoretical physics and the nature of time. Eventually, Harry and Vincent both realize the other is also an Ouroboran. Other members of the Cronus Club later inform Harry that the world is ending and that with each life Harry lives, the ending is becoming closer.

== Reception ==
Eric Brown writing in The Guardian praises the novel "a gripping read that is often quietly profound, emotionally affecting and intellectually dizzying." and concludes "As might be expected from such a narrative, the novel is an examination of determinism and free will, but also a subtle study of friendship, love and the fluid complexity of existence."

Nancy Hightower in The Washington Post highlights the relationship of Harry to Vincent: "The true heart of the book lies in Harry’s twisted relationship with this nemesis, because the only way to kill a kalachakra is to get him to reveal the specifics regarding his birth. Harry’s arch enemy ends up becoming, in a sense, his best friend as well as colleague, making their mutual betrayals all the more wrenching."

Ana Grilo in Kirkus Reviews describes the book as being "Groundhog Day on Red Bull", it "raises a lot of questions. It features an intriguing premise to start with and the fact that Harry is a member of a group of people who undergo the same process every time they die is all the more fascinating: Who are they? Why are they like that?...Are they living in exactly the same world every time? Or is every life a wholly new one lived in an alternate universe?'. Grilo does though criticize Harry's narrative voice : "Mostly, he experiences life with a strong sense of detachment, a blankness that is partly due to survival instinct, partly due to the fact that he is mnemonic. This blankness unfortunately seeps into the narrative." She concludes: 'Inasmuch as the plot is engaging and I was driven to find out how would Harry sort out the impending apocalypse, the question of authenticity of the narrative mode and the blankness of Harry as a character considerably detracted from the overall experience."

== See also ==
- Eternal return – concept
- Groundhog Day – film
- Life After Life – novel
- Replay – novel
- Sliding Doors – film
- The Devil's Hour – television series
- Moira MacTaggert - comic book character
