= Harry Josephine Giles =

Scottish writer and performer (born 1986)

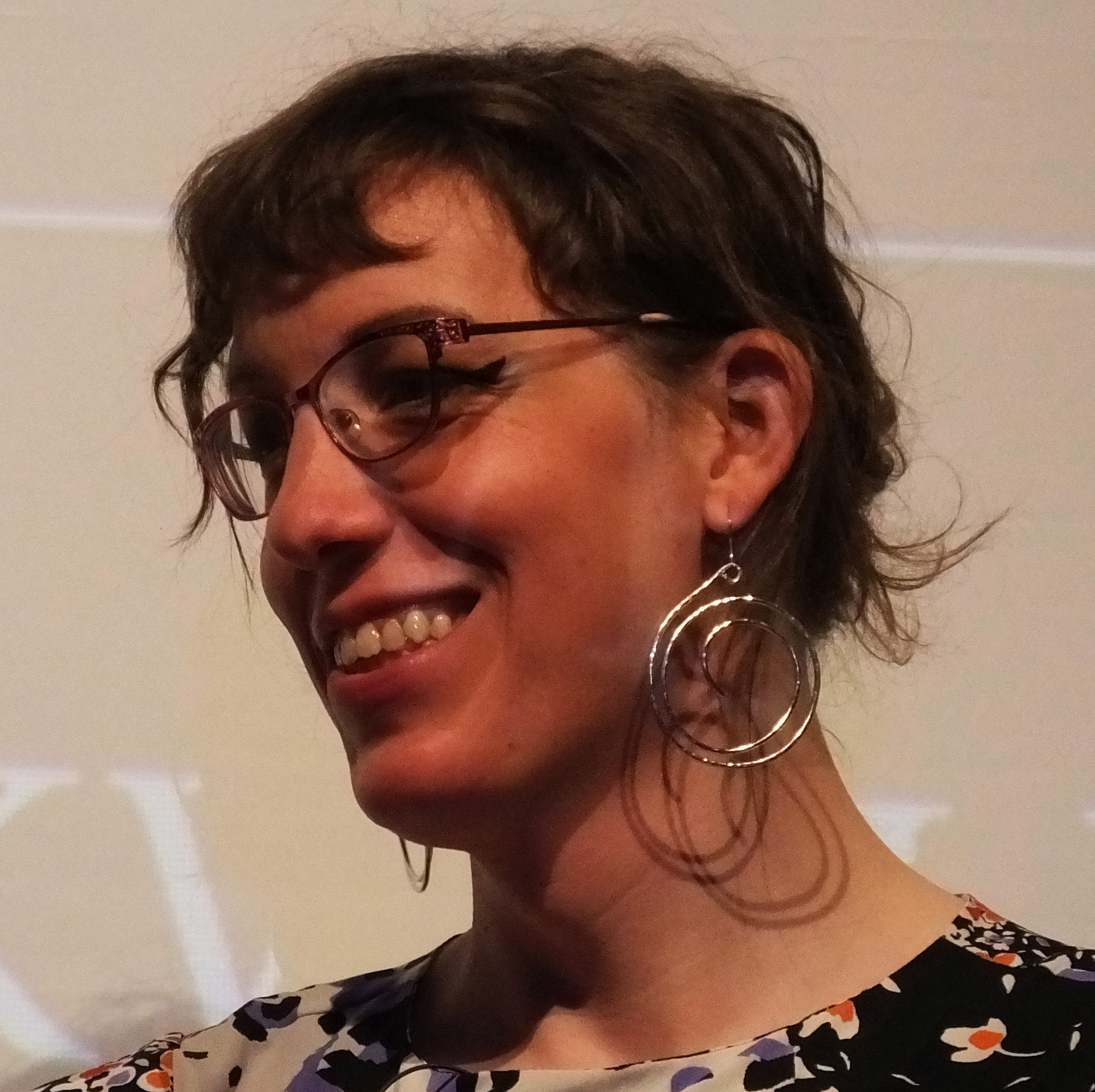
- Giles in 2022
- Born: December 1986 (age 39)
- Education: University of St Andrews (MA); East 15 Acting School (MA); University of Stirling (PhD)
- Occupations: Poet; writer; singer
- Website: harryjosephine.com

Harry Josephine Giles (born 1986) is a Scottish writer, singer and poet who previously lived in Orkney. In 2022, she won the Arthur C. Clarke Award for her novel Deep Wheel Orcadia.

== Biography ==
Giles was brought up in Orkney and currently lives in Edinburgh. She obtained a Master of Arts degree in Sustainable Development from the University of St Andrews in 2009, and another MA in Theatre Directing from the East 15 acting school. In 2020, she successfully defended a PhD thesis at the University of Stirling. Her supervisors were Kathleen Jamie and Scott Hames.

In March 2020, Giles was one of 100 poets and writers who signed an open letter to the Scottish Poetry Library after the library declined to censure Scots feminist poets who did not recognise transgender people and their rights.

== Writing career ==
Giles became widely known after winning the 2009 BBC poetry slam and has won or been shortlisted for other poetry awards since. In particular, two volumes of poetry, Tonguit (2015) and The Games, were shortlisted for the Edwin Morgan Poetry Award. Tonguit was also shortlisted for the Forward Prize for Best First Collection. In October 2010, Giles co-founded Inky Fingers, a poetry and spoken-word performance collective in Edinburgh, that claimed in 2020 to be Edinburgh's oldest open-mic night still running.

In 2021, Giles published a verse novel called Deep Wheel Orcadia. It won the 2022 Arthur C. Clarke Award. It was also longlisted for the Highland Book Prize, but Giles withdrew it in protest against the all-white longlist.

== Personal life ==
Giles identifies as non-binary and uses she/they pronouns.

== Works ==
- Visa Wedding (2013); Pamphlet
- Oam (2014); Pamphlet
- Farmform (2014); Series of postcards, website
- Drone (2014); Sequence
- Tonguit (2015); Collection
- Casual Games for Casual Hikers (2015); Art print
- Funding a Ritual (2015); Pamphlet
- Raik (2015); Game
- 14 Ways To Reread a Favourite Novel (2016); Pamphlet
- Casual Games for City Walkers (2016); Art print, website
- Trump/Pattinson (2017); Pamphlet, website
- Travellers' Lexicon (2017); Artbook, website
- New Minstrelsy of the Scottish Border (2018); Pamphlet, website
- The Games (2018); Book
- Some Definitions (2019); Zine
- Stim (2019); Zine
- Moon, Sun, and All Things (2019); Zine
- Wages for Transition (2019); Zine
- Deep Wheel Orcadia (2021); Novel
- Them (2024); Poems
