= Dreaming in Smoke =

1998 novel by Tricia Sullivan

Dreaming in Smoke is a science fiction novel by American writer Tricia Sullivan. The book is Sullivan's third science fiction novel and was first published as a hardcover by Millennium (an imprint of Orion Publishing Group) in January 1998. The novel won the 1999 Arthur C. Clarke Award for best novel.

== Plot summary ==
Kalypso Deed is the professionally disappointing test tube offspring of genius Earth based parents that she has never met. In her role as shotgun on the environmentally inhospitable planet T'nane, Kalypso is charged with the unchallenging responsibility of babysitting Earthborn colonist Azamat Marcsson, as he enters a virtual reality world, called Alien Life, in order to solve the terraforming obstacles that prevent the Earthborn colonists and their T'nane born children (such as Kalypso) from venturing outside the man-made station. Through the merging of high level mathematics and the dream world controlled by an artificial intelligence entity named Ganesh, Marcsson attempts to solve the 'oxygen problem' that makes their lives so precarious but instead he crashes the system, thanks to an unauthorised bridge from Alien Life to the core processing unit (The Core), that was created by the rebellious Kalypso so that she could listen to jazz music.

With the life supporting systems that underpin their lives crashing around them, Kalypso takes on the real-world responsibility of shepherding a now seemingly crazy Marcsson to the witch doctors who are trying to fix Ganesh, whilst fielding angry accusations of sabotage from those she loves the most. When the much larger Marcsson turns aggressive, and kidnaps Kalypso, she is plunged further into the madness, and her life placed on a knife edge, as Marcsson drags her into the dangerous landless outside world of T'nane (the wild) to meet a biologically altered Earthborn colonist who was supposed to be dead.

Forced to accompany, the stranger, Neko, in a small canoe like boat, Kalypso learns that much of the knowledge she has been brought up to believe is instead, a lie. The fact that Neko and the rest of 'the dead' can breathe and survive in the wild without a protective suit is one such revelation. That these genetically altered, part-humans secrete the addictive drug Picasso Blue from their bodies and trade it to the drug addicted mothers is beyond revelation, it turns her understanding of her world, upside down.

Before Kalypso has time to process her new knowledge she is once again kidnapped by Marcsson, along with the biologically morphing corpse of the legendary mother, Sieng, who is revered by the dead (her research transformed them into genetical mutants but enabled them to breathe and survive in the wild). When Marcsson begins to splice parts of Sieng's corpse with her own, in what appears to be a mad plan to continue Sieng's research, Kalypso realises that she must act or die. While Marcsson is deep inside a dream like trance, connecting with the remaining links of Ganesh to further pursue his research, Kalypso strips him of his protective suit, and runs down the oxygen in the canoe's protective tent. When he awakes, they scuffle, and Marcsson ends up outside the boat and seemingly dead.

Out of immediate danger, Kalypso has little time to reflect and is reminded that without Ganesh to protect the station, the station is being slowly destroyed by the hostile environment of T'nane. Meanwhile, a war has broken out between the dead and the colonists, the former of whom decide to strip the station of anything of value before it is destroyed.

Kalypso realises that her mission hasn't changed since Marcsson first started berking and everything went bad. She retrieves Marcssons unconscious body and returns to the station with both his and Sieng's corpses. Once there she realises that her deep connection to Ganesh (through her time as a shotgun) makes her the only person who can save the A.I. and with it the station. She enters the sensory tank and does battle with a dreaming Marcsson, whose very essence is linked into the fabric of Ganesh. No longer completely human, thanks to Sieng's flesh, she not only succeeds in restoring Ganesh, but transforms it, as the full potential of Marcsson's research is realised. As the revitalised Ganesh spreads its new awareness through the station, and then into the planetary luma, it triggers a positive transformation in the environmental fabric of T'nane. The planet becomes hospitable to human life.

== Main characters ==
=== The children ===
T'nane born colonists who left Earth in a test tube and whose parents were chosen from the genetically best that Earth has to offer. They live in clusters that act as surrogate families.

==== Kalypso's Cluster ====
- Kalypso Deed is the rebellious female lead character who has a special relationship with the artificial intelligence life support system, Ganesh. She loves jazz, avoids responsibility and in her role as a lowly shotgun, is a professional disappointment to those who know her.
- Liet, female, "who always seemed to have misplaced her own head until you asked her something she knew, and then you found out she knew everything and would tell you."
- Sharia is the cell's alpha female and a "class A worrywort" who would never make a mistake on a task once she was involved.
- Ahmad has a direct manner that can get under Kalypso's skin. He and Liet share a romantic involvement. Joins Robere's security team when the conflict with the dead begins.
- Xiaxiang is a kind, giving male whose "generosity is compulsive."
- Tehar, is a witch doctor responsible for fixing problems with Ganesh. Kalypso is attracted to him although she admits there is, "No way of knowing what to think of him."

=== The mothers ===
Earthborn women chosen for colonisation based on a combination of personality, academic and child bearing capabilities. They give birth to and raise 'the children' despite having no biological connection to their offspring. They run the station.

- Helen - gave birth to Kalypso
- Lassare - when Kalypso was caught doing something wrong during her childhood, "It was Lassare who always found a way to make her suffer." Kalypso is afraid of her.
- Others: Rasheeda, Mari, Naomi, Korynne

=== The grunts ===
Earthborn males chosen for their amiable personalities, physical prowess and scientific or technical skills. Their primary role was to support the mothers during the early childbearing phase.

- Azamat Marcsson - the last of the earthborn exobiologists and specialist in colonial organisms. "Classic grunt profile. Stable, subordinate, good at moving heavy objects."
- Jianni - chief witch doctor whose personal views sometimes put him in opposition to the mothers.
- Robere - a more militant colonist who acts as leader of the grunts when the dead attack the station.
- Kessel - follower of Robere, who was out for blood during the conflict with the dead.

=== The dead ===
Earthborn women, and former mothers, who were cast out into 'the wild' when they were unable to perform their main task, giving birth to 'the children'. Believed dead by the children, they were in fact alive and trading the addictive Picasso Blue to the mothers.

- Sieng - the brilliant scientist who discovered that luma's cellular structure was a compatible conduit to Ganesh. She was kicked out of the station after she used her own body as a guinea pig for scientific experimentation. Her now dead body is used for biological experiments due to its unique, and changing molecular structure.
- Neko - acted as mentor to Kalypso, after Marcsson handed her over in the wild.
- Teres - the apparent leader of the dead.

== Book specific language ==
Alien Life - the online dream world overseen by Ganesh. Colonists enter this area via sensory baths in an attempt to solve complicated scientific problems.

Berk - to lose one's head. Temporary or prolonged insanity triggered by some event.

Ganesh - the continuously evolving artificial intelligence system that is infused into the luma.

Grok - to understand something completely.

Luma - the fundamental building block of all things on T'nane.

Picasso Blue - the addictive substance sourced from the bodies of 'the dead.'

Shotgun - colonists responsible for babysitting more academically productive members of their society who enter Ganesh in a dream like state.

The core - Ganesh's most basic, root programming that does not evolve. Is supposed to be inaccessible.

The wild - the natural environment of T'nane that is inhospitable to human life.

Witch doctors - the colonists responsible for monitoring and fixing the artificial intelligence system, Ganesh. Futuristic I.T. specialists.

== Publication history ==
Dreaming in Smoke has been published in numerous forms:

1998, hardcover, Millennium (290 pages)

1998, April 20, paperback, Millennium / Orion (320 pages)

1998, May 4, mass market paperback, Spectra / Bantam Books (416 pages)

1999, August 12, mass market paperback, Orion (304 pages)

2013, September 24, ebook, Gateway (290 pages)

2013, September 26, Kindle edition, Gateway (250 pages)

2013, September 26, Kindle edition, Gateway (290 pages)

2016, June 21, audio CD, Audible Studios

2018, August 23, paperback, Gollancz / Orion (304 pages)

== Awards and nominations ==
Dreaming in Smoke won the 1999 Arthur C. Clarke Award for best novel.
