= Deep Wheel Orcadia =

Science-fiction novel by Harry Josephine Giles

- Author: Harry Josephine Giles
- Language: Scots, English
- Genre: Science fiction, verse novel
- Published: 2021
- Publisher: Picador Poetry
- Publication place: United Kingdom
- Media type: Print
- ISBN: 978-1-5290-6660-9

Deep Wheel Orcadia is a science-fiction novel by Harry Josephine Giles. It is a verse novel written in the Orcadian dialect of the Scots language in parallel with an English translation. The book won the 2022 Arthur C. Clarke Award. It was published by Picador Poetry in 2021.

== Plot ==
The story is a romance set on a space station orbiting a gas giant.

== Style ==
The book is written in Orcadian verse, with an English translation provided in smaller text. Translations for Orcadian words provide several possible English translations in a compound word. The English translations were formatted to draw attention to the Orcadian, a technique also used by Gaelic poet Rody Gorman.

== Awards ==
The book was longlisted for the Highland Book Prize longlist, but was withdrawn by Giles over the lack of minority representation. Deep Wheel Orcadia was the only work withdrawn.

In 2022, Deep Wheel Orcadia won the Arthur C. Clarke Award, where it was praised for its writing and its use of language.

== Reception ==
The Guardian called the book "a book of astonishments". The Orkney News made favourable comparisons between elements of the story and life on Orkney, such as bad internet speeds, but felt the ending was unsatisfying and the cast list excessive.

The Scotsman said the book "lacked direction" and criticised the use of Orcadian.

The chair of the judges for the Arthur C. Clarke Award described the book as "the sort of book that makes you rethink what science fiction can do and makes the reading experience feel strange in a new and thrilling way. It's as if language itself becomes the book's hero and the genre is all the richer for it."
