= Misha (writer) =

American science fiction writer

- Born: April 1955 (age 71); Saint Paul, Minnesota, U.S.
- Education: Eastern Washington University; Portland State University; Eastern Oregon University
- Occupation: Science fiction writer
- Notable work: Red Spider White Web (1990)

Misha Nogha Chocholak (born April 1955) is an American science fiction writer. Of Métis background, she is known for her 1990 cyberpunk novel Red Spider White Web.

== Biography ==
Misha Nogha Chocholak, of Cree-Métis and Norwegian ancestry, was born in April 1955 in Saint Paul, Minnesota and studied at Eastern Washington University, Portland State University, and Eastern Oregon University. In 1986, she published the short story "The Wishing Well" in the May issue of New Pathways. In 1989, she published Prayers of Steel, a story collection with poetry.

In 1990, Misha published Red Spider White Web, a cyberpunk/romantic novel about a Native American artist turned human–wolverine hybrid struggling in a Japan-dominated United States damaged by the climate crisis. Stina Attebery described Misha "as an important figure for both Indigenous futurisms and Indigenous cyberpunk", citing the novel's "ecological and feminist themes" in contrast to the masculinity of first-wave cyberpunk. She won the 1991 Readercon novel award for Red Spider White Web. She was also shortlisted for the 1991 Arthur C. Clarke Award for the book, but lost to Colin Greenland's Take Back Plenty.

Misha was an editor at science fiction magazine New Pathways; John Clute later described her as "influential". In 1993, she published Ke-Qua-Hawk-As, another story collection with poetry, and Dr. Ihoka's Cure, a non-fiction title. She is also a musician.

In 2007, Misha published another poetry book Magpies & Tigers. She also began working on another novel, Yellowjacket.

As of 2008, Misha and her husband, composer Michael Chocholak, lived in Cove, Oregon.

== Works ==
- Prayers of Steel (1989)
- Red Spider White Web (1990)
- Dr. Ihoka's Cure (1993)
- Ke-Qua-Hawk-As (1993)
- Magpies & Tigers (2007)
