= Semiosis (novel) =

2018 science fiction novel by Sue Burke

- First edition cover
- Author: Sue Burke
- Cover artist: Nigel Cattlin
- Language: English
- Series: Semiosis Trilogy
- Genre: Science fiction
- Publisher: Tor Books
- Publication date: February 6, 2018
- Publication place: United States
- Media type: Hardback
- Pages: 333
- ISBN: 978-0-7653-9135-3
- OCLC: 1021057780
- Dewey Decimal: 813/.6—dc23
- LC Class: PS3602.U7556S46 2018
- Followed by: Interference

Semiosis is a 2018 science fiction novel by American writer and translator Sue Burke. It is her debut novel and is the first book of her Semiosis Trilogy series. It was first published in February 2018 in the United States by Tor Books, and in August 2018 in the United Kingdom by HarperVoyager. The book was translated into French by Florence Bury, and published in France in September 2019 by Albin Michel.

Semiosis is about colonists starting a new life on the planet Pax and their alliances with sentient indigenous plant species. The title of the book refers to semiosis, a communicative process using signs. It was shortlisted for the 2019 Arthur C. Clarke Award, the John W. Campbell Memorial Award for Best Science Fiction Novel, the Kitschies Golden Tentacle for Best Debut Novel, and the Locus Award for Best First Novel. Semiosis also featured in the Chicago Review of Books' "10 Best Science Fiction Books of 2018".

The sequel to Semiosis, Interference was published in October 2019 by Tor Books. The third book in the series is Usurpation. Burke also wrote three short stories set on the planet Pax: "Adaptation", written before she began Semiosis, and "Spiders" and "Cinderella Faraway", written after she completed the novel, but before it was published.

== Plot summary ==
To escape war and ecological disasters on Earth in the 2060's, a group of colonists attempt to forge a new life on a distant earth-like planet they name Pax (Latin for "peace"). They find the world is rich in flora and fauna, and appears to be ideally suited for establishing a new colony. But they soon notice that some of the plant life is sentient, and are manipulating them to further their own ends.

The colonists find an abandoned alien city made of glass and relocate their colony there. But they discover that the city is controlled by an intelligent bamboo-like plant they later call Stevland. (Note: Stevland was named after Stevland Jamil Barr, the first colonist to die en route to Pax from Earth. Barr's first name was taken from Stevie Wonder's birth name, Stevland Hardaway Morris.) It attempts to domesticate them in order to flourish and expand, and the humans realize that to survive, they need to share the city with it. Over time, the colonists learn to converse with Stevland using signs, and an uneasy, but mutually beneficial alliance is formed.

During one of the colonist's expeditions further inland, they meet the city's creators, the Glassmakers. The arthropod-like Glassmakers were themselves colonists and coexisted with Stevland, but they abandoned their home and became nomadic. (Note: No reason is given in the text as to why the Glassmakers left the city. After receiving queries about this, Burke said she realized she had cut the explanation from an earlier draft of the novel, believing she had already stated it elsewhere. This is the text that was removed from one of Stevland's monologues in "Lucille and Stevland: Year 107–Generation 7": We have also learned why they left, according to their oral tradition. Their colony was failing, and because their genus is nomadic like moths or certain large crabs, they decided to return to the old ways in hopes that it would prove more helpful, but nomadic life did not increase survival since the problem was malnutrition and illness. Females were especially vulnerable, perhaps due to the strain of childbirth, and the orphans grew ungovernable. Finally, after many decades of unceasing decline and in desperation, they decided to return to the city, only to find it occupied. I am sorry I was unable to provide better care when they lived here earlier. I will do so now, and I have learned what I must do to keep them in the city.) Disease and illness decimated them and their social structures collapsed. The encounter with the Glassmakers is not friendly and leads to an attack on the city. With Stevland's assistance, the Glassmakers are repelled, and the humans, a few Glassmakers willing to coexist with them, and Stevland, form an alliance of peaceful coexistence.

== Background ==
In the mid-1990s Burke wrote an essay entitled "When Plants Kill". She had noticed that one of her house plants had killed another plant, and decided to undertake some research into plant behavior. She discovered that plants fight for light and nutrients, and will manipulate and even kill each other to get what they want. This formed the basis of the essay, which was published as "The Photosynthetic War" in 1997 in a science fiction magazine, Terra Incognita. In 1996 Burke participated in a Clarion Workshop, and the instructor gave the attendees a writing prompt about a wall that materializes between two warring armies. Burke considered the possibility of a planet with plants at war with each other and human colonists coming between them. This resulted in a short story "Adaptation", which she published in 1999 in LC-39, a science fiction magazine. Burke later expanded "Adaptation" into Semiosis, with the short story becoming the first chapter.

Burke finished writing Semiosis in 2004, but she was unable to find a publisher. In an attempt to generate interest in the universe she had created, Burke wrote two short stories, "Spiders" and "Cinderella Faraway". "Spiders" was published in the March 2008 issue of Asimov's Science Fiction, and was later reprinted in 2009 in Year's Best SF 14. The success of "Spiders" attracted the attention of several publishers, but it was not until 2016 that a deal with Tor Books was signed. Semiosis was finally published by Tor in 2018.

== Reception ==
In a review at Tor.com, Liz Bourke described Semiosis as "a quiet, measured sort of science fiction". She said the book's central theme is about power and its use and abuse, with a "deep vein of kindness" that probes the "weaknesses and flaws of all sentient being". Bourke praised the author's "excellent grasp of voice and characterisation", despite Stevland coming across as "a little too human for an alien plant". She called the book "a very strong debut, and well worth checking out", but felt it could have been even "stronger" had not all the central characters been "cisgender straight [people]". Bourke opined that being a story about a "future attempted-utopian society", the absence of "queer people rather strains at my disbelief".

A review in Kirkus Reviews described Burke's worldbuilding in Semiosis as "astonishing", with "magnificently alien" flora and fauna, and a "richly detailed" human society. But it felt that the novel's periodic jump to the next generation makes it feel like a collection of short stories in a shared universe. The book "feel[s] rushed", plot threads "end abruptly", and "genuinely engrossing characters" remain underdeveloped. The review called Semiosis "[a]n outstanding science-fiction novel hobbled by its rushed story structure." Craig Clark also felt that Semiosis comes across as "linked short stories". Reviewing the book in Booklist, he wrote that the "multigenerational" structure of the book leads to a large cast of characters that can be "overwhelming", but praised the author's worldbuilding and the way she integrates colonization with botany, mutualism and predation. Overall, Clark called the novel "a thought-provoking look into the politics of survival."

Laci Gerhart wrote in a review of Semiosis in the journal Nature Plants that biologists may find that Pax's ecology and the depiction of its sentient plants "leaves something to be desired". The planet's fauna and flora are largely named after Earth species, which she felt lacks imagination and makes their added abilities compared to their Earth counterparts "feel less realistic". What also weakens its realism is that the indigenous sentient species "feel very human in their thoughts and behaviour". Gerhart complained about how unscientific the human scientists are. They "leap to incredible conclusions, [using] single observations and extremely limited information [as] irrefutable evidence". She acknowledged the fine line a science fiction author has to walk to appease both lay- and scientific-audiences, and concluded: "Despite these drawbacks, a plant biologist can enjoy Semiosis, particularly if one is capable of suspending disbelief on developmental capabilities in plants."

== Awards ==
Award	Year	Result
Arthur C. Clarke Award	2019	Shortlisted
John W. Campbell Memorial Award for Best Science Fiction Novel	2019	Shortlisted
Kitschies Golden Tentacle for Best Debut Novel	2019	Shortlisted
Locus Award for Best First Novel	2019	Shortlisted

== Works cited ==
- Burke, Sue (2018). Semiosis (e-book ed.). New York City: Tor Books. ISBN 978-0-7653-9137-7.
