= Tricia Sullivan =

American science fiction writer

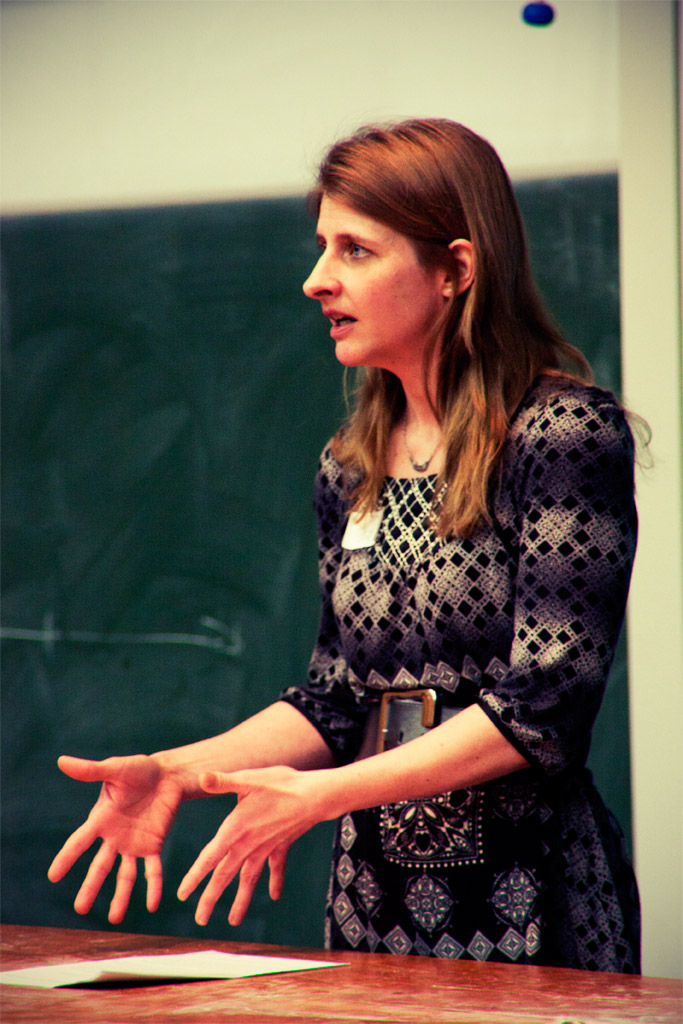
Tricia Sullivan

Tricia Sullivan (born July 7, 1968 in New Jersey, United States) is an American science fiction writer. She also writes fantasy under the pseudonym Valery Leith.

She moved to the United Kingdom in 1995. In 1999 she won the Arthur C. Clarke Award for her novel Dreaming in Smoke. Her novels Maul, Lightborn, and Occupy Me have also been shortlisted for the Clarke award, in 2004, 2011, and 2017 respectively.

Sullivan has studied music and martial arts. Her partner is the martial artist Steve Morris, with whom she has three children. They live in Shropshire.

== Bibliography ==
=== Science fiction ===
- The Question Eaters (1995) (Short Story)
- Lethe (1995)
- Someone to Watch over Me (1997)
- Dreaming in Smoke (1998)
- Maul (2003)
- Double Vision (2005)
- Sound Mind (2007)
- Lightborn (2010)
- Occupy Me (2016)
- Sweet Dreams (2017)
- A Mound Dug by Two (2023)

=== Fantasy fiction ===
- Shadowboxer (2014)

==== Everien series (as Valery Leith) ====
- The Company of Glass (1999)
- The Riddled Night (2000)
- The Way of the Rose (2001)
