= 9tail Fox =

2005 novel by Jon Courtenay Grimwood

- First edition cover
- Author: Jon Courtenay Grimwood
- Language: English
- Genre: Speculative fiction novel
- Published: 2005 (Victor Gollancz Ltd)
- Publication place: United Kingdom
- Media type: Print (Hardcover)
- ISBN: 0-575-07615-1 (first edition, hardback)
- OCLC: 61302292

9tail Fox is a 2005 novel by Jon Courtenay Grimwood.

== Plot summary ==
The plot centres on Bobby Zha, a Sergeant at the fictional SFPD Chinatown station in San Francisco. The claimed shooting of a burglar by eleven-year-old Natalie Persikov conflicts with Zha's intuition on the matter, but before he has a real chance to investigate he is shot himself.

After meeting the Jinwei hu (the nine-tailed fox of the title) while dead, Bobby wakes up in a hospital. However, there are a few surprises for him on waking; not least that apparently he isn't Bobby Zha anymore. The doctors tell him he's in New York, not San Francisco; he was never shot; and that he's Robert Van Berg, sole survivor of a car crash that killed both his parents and put him into a coma since he was seven. Now adult and sole inheritor of his family's considerable fortune, Bobby wastes no time in getting back to the West Coast to investigate.

In between looking into the case of his own murder, finding out what really happened at the Persikov's house and following up the leads from his contacts among the homeless of San Francisco, Bobby becomes increasingly concerned over his own identity. Changing identities at a whim — an FBI agent, a CIA investigator, a special forces agent direct from the White House — he questions his old acquaintances about Sergeant Zha, finding out more about himself than he ever knew.

The novel is set "a few years in the future", and frequently references Soviet author Mikhail Bulgakov. Grimwood notes in the Acknowledgments that "the choice of Persikov for Dr Misha's surname is entirely intentional."

== Literary significance and reception ==
Booklist described the story in 9tail Fox as a "typical revenge story transformed into a story of personal redemption—and a darn good one at that." Publishers Weekly said that "Grimwood does sustain interest with a premise that could have fallen flat in lesser hands."
