= The Raw Shark Texts =

2007 novel by Steven Hall

- Author: Steven Hall
- Language: English
- Genre: Literary fiction
- Publisher: Canongate, HarperCollins
- Publication date: 2007
- Publication place: United Kingdom
- Media type: Print (Hardback)
- Pages: 428 (first edition, hardback)
- ISBN: 978-0-00-200840-2 (first edition, hardback)
- OCLC: 81601270

The Raw Shark Texts is the debut novel by British author Steven Hall, released in 2007. The book was released by Canongate Books in the US and the UK and published by HarperCollins in Canada. The title is a play on "Rorschach Tests", which are inkblot tests. The novel is a work of Meta-fiction which uses Concrete poetry, linguistic jokes and cultural references. It is the story of an amnesiac re-discovering his past life through a surreal collection of clues he has left himself while evading a steampunk villain and the shark of the title.

== Plot summary ==
Eric Sanderson wakes up with no memory of who he is or any past experiences. He is told by a psychologist that he has a dissociative condition known as fugue but a trail of written clues purporting to be from his pre-amnesiac self describe a more fantastic and sinister explanation for his lack of memories. According to these, he has activated a conceptual shark called a Ludovician which "feeds on human memories and the intrinsic sense of self" and is relentlessly pursuing him and will eventually erase his personality completely.

When the Ludovician attacks Eric Sanderson, he decides to go in search of a doctor named Trey Fidorous, identified by the letters from his previous self, in the hope he may be able to help to explain what happened to him and how to defeat the shark. Eric travels through Britain in search of clues and is contacted by a mysterious figure called Mr. Nobody, who is part of a megalomaniac network intelligence called Mycroft Ward. Mr. Nobody attempts to subdue and control Eric but Eric manages to escape with the help of an associate of Fidorous named Scout. Scout takes Eric to meet Fidorous, travelling through un-space (an underground network of empty warehouses and unused cellars). They begin a romantic relationship during the journey but Eric feels betrayed when he discovers that Scout has brought him to Fidorous to use him as bait for the shark in the hope of destroying Ward.

With their help Fidorous builds a conceptual shark-hunting boat and they sail out on a conceptual ocean. After a battle with the shark they throw a laptop hooked up to the Mycroft Ward database into its mouth, destroying both Ward and the shark. Eric and Scout remain in the conceptual universe while Eric's dead body is discovered back in the real world.

== Visual style ==
The book uses different typographical sizes and structures to create pictures as a literal way of highlighting the cross-over between the objective reality and its description. Several pages form a flip book animation of a shark attack made out of text. The author has stated that he was interested in "text imagery" and "exploring ideas about language and the evolution of ideas and language in a visual sense".

== Negatives or un-chapters ==
The Raw Shark Texts consists of 36 core chapters bound into the novel itself, and an additional 36 "lost" sections, known as "negatives" or "un-chapters" which exist outside of the main printed text. These extra 'un-chapters' (also written by Steven Hall) have been found periodically since the book's initial release, hidden either online or in the real world. Unique negative content has also been discovered in several translated editions of the Raw Shark Texts since publication of the original English language edition in 2007.

On August 15, 2007, in The Raw Shark Texts Forum, Steven Hall wrote the following statement about The Raw Shark Texts negatives:

For each chapter in The Raw Shark Texts there is, or will be, an un-chapter, a negative. If you look carefully at the novel you might be able to figure out why these un-chapters are called negatives.

Not all the negatives are as long as a full novel chapter - some are only a page, some are only a couple of lines. Some are much longer than any chapters in the novel. About a quarter of them are out there so far. (It’s an ongoing project set to run for a while yet) Not all of the negatives are online, some are, but they're hiding. Some are out there in the real world, waiting to be found. Anyone with the Raw Shark UK special edition will already have Negative 6/36 and anyone with a Canadian edition will have Negative 36/36 (and also a good idea of what some of the other negatives are).

The negatives are not deleted scenes, they are very much a part of the novel but they are all splintered from it in some way.

Several sections of the Raw Shark Texts Forum are devoted to the ongoing process of discovering and documenting the negatives. Many negatives are still unaccounted for.

== Characters ==
Eric Sanderson

Eric narrates the story. Before losing his memory, Eric's partner Clio Aames is killed in a scuba diving accident. According to the accounts from his previous self, he attempted to use the conceptual shark to create a conceptual version of Clio from his memories of her but that it had caused him to lose his memory and sense of identity. The "2nd Eric Sanderson", post-amnesia, is lost and confused, unable to get a handle on who he is or what is real.

Scout

Scout is described as a young woman who has been damaged by the powerful Mycroft Ward. Her relationship with Eric develops from his rescuer and guide to romantic partner complicated by the fact that she has ulterior motives for seeking him out. The connection between her and Clio is ambiguous: they have an identical tattoo and the damage by Ward appears similar to Clio's cancer.

Dr. Trey Fidorous

One of two characters to know Sanderson both before and after his amnesia, Fidorous is described as an archetypal eccentric academic who is the definitive expert on the pseudo-scientific world that conceptual sharks and Mycroft Ward inhabit.

Clio Aames

Clio Aames is the first Eric Sanderson's girlfriend, revealed only in the text through various letters and fragments.

Ian the cat

A large cat of unfriendly temperament, who belongs to Sanderson before his amnesia and accompanies him on his journey afterwards.

Mycroft Ward

Described as a 19th-century alchemist who, in his search for immortality, manages to download his personality into other people. In the present of the narrative Ward is seen as an internet-based network of linked intelligences with the single-minded purpose of self-preservation through absorbing people's personalities.

Dr. Randle

Dr. Randle is a retired doctor, presumably of psychology who counsels Sanderson on his condition.

Mr. Nobody

An agent of Mycroft Ward who attempts to trap Sanderson.

== Awards ==
The Raw Shark Texts won the Borders Original Voices Award (2007), the Somerset Maugham Award (2008), and was shortlisted for the Arthur C Clarke Award (2008).

== Film adaptation ==
Screenwriter Simon Beaufoy (Slumdog Millionaire) has completed a Raw Shark Texts screenplay for Blueprint Films. No director or cast have been confirmed for this project.
