= Venomous Lumpsucker =

2022 novel by Ned Beauman

- Author: Ned Beauman
- Language: English
- Genre: Science fiction; climate fiction
- Publisher: Soho Press
- Publication date: 12 July 2022
- Publication place: United Kingdom
- Pages: 336
- Awards: 2023 Arthur C. Clarke Award
- ISBN: 9781641294126

Venomous Lumpsucker is a 2022 novel by Ned Beauman. It won the 2023 Arthur C. Clarke Award. The novel tells the story of Karin Resaint, a scientist researching the titular species of fish.

== Plot ==
In the near future, humanity is driving many species to extinction. The process is regulated by the World Commission on Species Extinction (WCSE). If a company wishes to exterminate an intelligent species, they must pay a large number of "extinction credits" as recompense. Non-intelligent species cost only a single credit.

Karin Resaint is hired by Brahmasumudram, a multinational mining corporation. Her task is to determine whether the venomous lumpsucker, a species of fish, should be certified as intelligent for the WCSE. Resaint discovers that the lumpsuckers are among the most intelligent fish in the world. Before she can submit her report, the lumpsuckers’ last-known habitat is accidentally destroyed by mining robots.

A new change in the WCSE's regulations is voted upon. As long as the DNA and neural structure of species has been preserved in a “biobank,” it will not legally be considered extinct, even if there are no current living members of said species. This causes the price of extinction credits to fall.

Meanwhile, Mark Halyard works for Brahmasumudram. Halyard has stolen and short-sold the company's extinction credits, hoping to gain a windfall when the price plummets. A terrorist attack hits the largest known biobanks, deleting their repositories of information. This causes the price of credits to rise sharply, meaning that Halyard will be caught if he cannot produce evidence of a living population of lumpsuckers.

Resaint and Halyard go to Sanctuary North, a nature preserve, searching for surviving lumpsuckers. Due to technological errors and bureaucratic mismanagement, all of the local fish have died. Halyard and Resaint are later attacked by an ecoterrorist and are almost shot. Resaint does not attempt to stop the man, revealing that she harbors an antipathy regarding the value of human life due to humanity's role in species extinction. Resaint harbors a fantasy in which she teaches lumpsuckers about humanity and is stung to death in revenge.

Halyard and Resaint then visit a refugee camp for workers from the Hermit Kingdom, referring to a United Kingdom which has withdrawn from the world stage. Halyard learns that a woman known as the mermaid may have information about the attack on the biobanks. He hopes to trade this information for clemency. They go to Surface Wave, a floating city which is currently being overrun by genetically modified gnats. During their investigation, Resaint discovers a population of lumpsuckers living in a kelp forest under Surface Wave. A Surface Wave scientist plans to dump chlorine into the kelp forest, which will kill the gnats but have the side effect of destroying the lumpsuckers. Halyard and Resaint stop the gnats, but are too late as the chlorine is deployed anyway.

During their escape, they encounter the mermaid, revealed to be a high-ranking British politician who has fled her own country. Large portions of Britain have recently been sold to a billionaire named Barker to form a reserve for endangered species. Resaint, Halyard, and the mermaid sneak into the Hermit Kingdom, hoping to find lumpsuckers at this reserve.

Resaint speaks to Barker, who reveals that his purpose for creating the reserve was not preservation, but rather to form his own private hunting ground. The mermaid betrays her fellow travelers and attacks Barker, viewing the reserve as an attack on her nation's sovereignty. Resaint and Halyard flee. Resaint falls to her apparent death. Halyard is forced to leave her behind as he leaves the Hermit Kingdom.

In an epilogue, Halyard becomes an animal rights activist. He plans to poison a group of extinction industry leaders during a dinner event, but begins to reconsider during their discussion.

In a second epilogue, a copy of Resaint's consciousness is uploaded and has a conversation with a sentient AI. It discusses the Holocene extinction and offers her a chance to observe the future of evolution over the course of millions of years.

== Reception and awards ==
Kevin Power of The Guardian wrote that Venomous Lumpsucker is a systems novel, a style which has recently fallen out of favor in the literary world. Powers notes that "this is a pity, because the systems that systems novels exist to describe and satirise have not exactly gone away." The review called Venomous Lumpsucker a "near-faultless technical performance" and stated that it is Beauman's best novel to date. The review concluded that "to read the book is to be told a story that is at once extremely funny in its details and darkly grief-stricken in its totality."

Paul Di Filippo of Locus praised the relationship between Resaint and Halyard, commenting on their "intense, witty, bantering philosophical dialogue." Beauman avoids portraying either as entirely correct in their approach; Di Filippo states that "each one gets off stimulating arguments in his or her favor, presenting the reader with the equivalent of a vivid enjoyable Socratic teach-in." The same review praised the postmodern style and Beauman's omniscient narration, noting that it rises to the level of author authors including Neal Stephenson, Matt Ruff, and Nick Harkaway.

Ben Walker of London Review of Books wrote that Beauman's system of extinction credits closely parallels the real-world practice of biodiversity offsetting. Walker also stated that Beauman's worldbuilding includes "institutional machinery that fills the gap between the market and reality." The review compared the bureaucracy of Beauman's novel to works by Franz Kafka and David Foster Wallace. According to Walker, Surface Wave was the most interesting setting in the novel, "a floating city in the Gulf of Finland full of eco-Elon Musks, where residents pay no income tax and all business is conducted off-grid using cryptocurrencies. This is a version of the future – one in which biotech and libertarian governance are intertwined – that’s surprisingly underexplored in contemporary speculative fiction."

The novel won the 2023 Arthur C. Clarke Award.
