= RB Kelly =

Irish science fiction author

RB Kelly (born 1979) is a Northern Irish science fiction writer from Belfast. Her debut novel Edge of Heaven was a winner of the Irish Writers Centre Novel Fair and shortlisted for the 2021 Arthur C Clarke Award and the 2022 European Science Fiction Association Award for Best Written Work of Fiction. The sequel, On The Brink, was longlisted for the BSFA Award for Best Novel.

Kelly attended Methodist College Belfast and Ulster University, where she completed a degree in Media Studies and a Ph.D. in film theory. Her non-fiction book, Mark Antony and Popular Culture, was drawn from her doctoral research. From 2020 to 2023, she was a judge, with Lucy Caldwell, of the Mairtín Crawford Award for Short Stories.

== Bibliography ==
=== Novels ===
- Edge of Heaven (2016); (reprinted 2020)
- On the Brink (2022)

=== Non-fiction ===
- Mark Antony and Popular Culture: Masculinity and the Construction of an Icon (2014 - as Rachael Kelly)

== Awards ==
=== Won ===
- The Irish Writers Centre Novel Fair (2014): Edge of Heaven
- The Orange Northern Woman Short Story Award (2003): Long Anna River

=== Nominations ===
- The European Science Fiction Society Award - Best Written Work of Fiction (2022) - Edge of Heaven
- The Arthur C Clarke Award (2021) - Edge of Heaven
