= Ned Beauman =

British novelist and journalist (born 1985)

Ned Beauman (born 1985) is a British novelist, journalist and screenwriter. The author of five novels, he was selected as one of the Best of Young British Novelists by Granta magazine in 2013.

== Biography ==
Born in London, Beauman is the son of Persephone Books founder Nicola Beauman and economist Christopher Beauman. He attended Winchester College and studied philosophy at Trinity College, Cambridge. His influences include Jorge Luis Borges, Raymond Chandler and John Updike, along with more recent writers such as Michael Chabon, William Gibson and David Foster Wallace. All of his novels are published in the UK by Sceptre. In addition to novels, he has contributed journalism and literary criticism to The Guardian, The White Review, the London Review of Books, Cabinet and Fantastic Man.

== Awards and honours ==
- 2011: Desmond Elliott Prize shortlist for Boxer, Beetle
- 2011: National Jewish Book Award winner in Debut Fiction for Boxer, Beetle
- 2012: Guardian First Book Award shortlist for Boxer, Beetle
- 2012: Man Booker Prize longlist for The Teleportation Accident
- 2012: Encore Award winner for The Teleportation Accident
- 2013: Somerset Maugham Award winner for The Teleportation Accident
- 2013: Granta list of 20 best young writers
- 2023: Arthur C. Clarke Award winner for Venomous Lumpsucker

== Works ==
- 2010: Boxer, Beetle
- 2012: The Teleportation Accident
- 2014: Glow
- 2017: Madness Is Better Than Defeat
- 2022: Venomous Lumpsucker
- 2025: The Captive (as Kit Burgoyne)
