= Simon Beaufoy =

British screenwriter

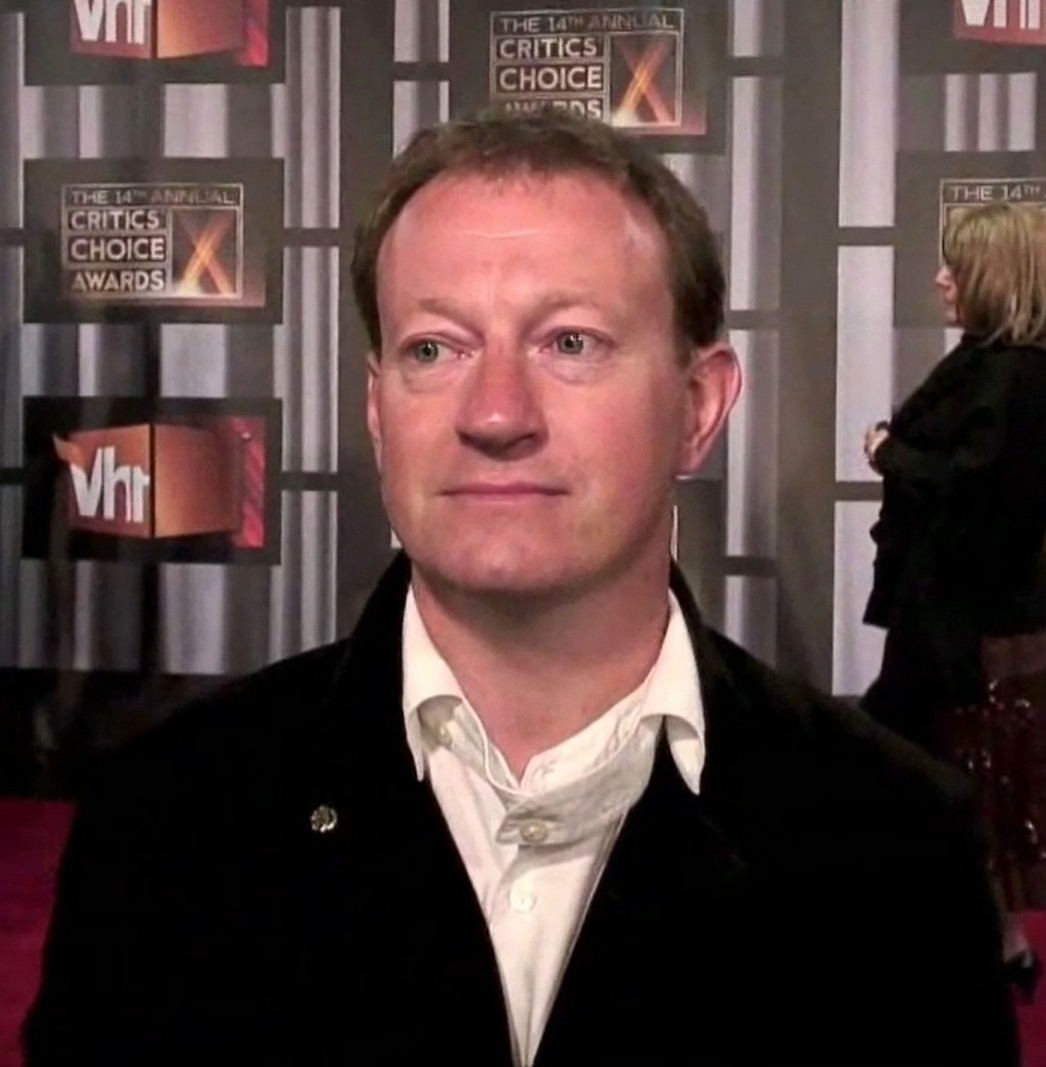
- Beaufoy in 2009
- Born: 26 December 1966 (age 59); Keighley, West Riding of Yorkshire, England
- Occupation: Screenwriter

Simon Beaufoy (/ˈboʊfɔɪ/; born 26 December 1966) is a British screenwriter. Born in Keighley, West Riding of Yorkshire, he was educated at Malsis School in Glusburn, Ermysted's Grammar School and Sedbergh School, he read English at St Peter's College, Oxford and graduated from Arts University Bournemouth. In 1997, he earned an Oscar nomination for Best Original Screenplay for The Full Monty. He went on to win the 2009 Academy Award for Best Adapted Screenplay for Slumdog Millionaire as well as winning a Golden Globe and a BAFTA award. Beaufoy also earned further Oscar, BAFTA and Golden Globe nominations for his co-written adaptation of Aron Ralston's autobiography Between a Rock and a Hard Place titled 127 Hours.

Beaufoy has also completed adaptations of The Raw Shark Texts by Steven Hall and the 2011 film version of Salmon Fishing in the Yemen by Paul Torday, as well as new adaptations of The Full Monty as both a stage play and limited television series.

== Filmography ==
- Yellow (1996) (short film)
- The Full Monty (1997)
- Among Giants (1998)
- Closer (1998) (short film)
- The Darkest Light (1999)
- This Is Not a Love Song (2001)
- Blow Dry (2001)
- Yasmin (2004)
- Miss Pettigrew Lives for a Day (2008)
- Burn Up (2008) (miniseries)
- Slumdog Millionaire (2008)
- 127 Hours (2010)
- Salmon Fishing in the Yemen (2011)
- The Hunger Games: Catching Fire (2013)
- Everest (2015)
- Battle of the Sexes (2017)
- Trust (2018) (TV series)
- The Full Monty (2023) (TV series)
- The Spy Who Came in from the Cold (TBA) (TV miniseries) (adaptation)
- A Matter of Time (TBA)
