= Angélica Gorodischer =

Argentine writer (1928–2022)

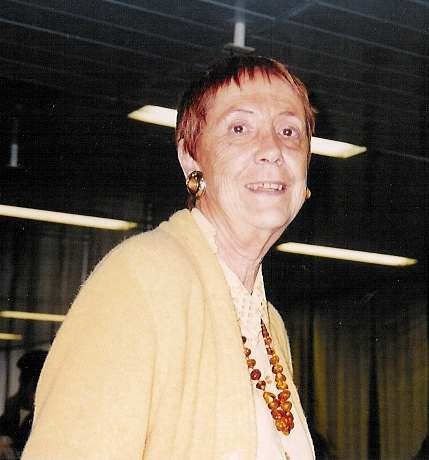
- Gorodischer in 1998
- Born: 28 July 1928; Buenos Aires, Argentina
- Died: 5 February 2022 (aged 93); Rosario, Argentina
- Occupation: Writer

Angélica Gorodischer (Angélica Beatriz del Rosario Arcal de Gorodischer)(28 July 1928 – 5 February 2022) was an Argentine writer whose short stories and novels belong to a wide variety of genres, including science fiction, fantasy, and crime. Her literature has a feminist perspective. The Encyclopedia of Science Fiction labels Gorodischer's work as more closely resembling the "highly literary work of Jorge Luis Borges or Italo Calvino than it does the...Magic Realism of authors like Gabriel García Márquez or Mario Vargas Llosa".

== Biography ==
Gorodischer was born in Buenos Aires on 28 July 1928. She lived in Rosario from the age of eight, and the city appeared very frequently in her work. One of her well-known characters, Trafalgar Medrano, is from the city. In 2007 the city council of Rosario awarded her the title of Illustrious Citizen.

In 1948 she married architect Sujer Gorodischer. She studied at University of Philosophy and Letters of the National University of the Litoral but did not complete a degree. She was awarded a Fulbright scholarship in 1988 and participated in the International Writing Program at the University of Iowa. She also used the Fulbright Program to teach at the University of Northern Colorado.

In the English-speaking world, Gorodischer might be best known for Kalpa Imperial (In Argentina volume 1 appeared in 1983 and both volumes by 1984). A collection of short stories, it details the history of a vast imaginary empire through tales of fantasy, fable, and allegory. Its English translation by notable United States speculative fiction author Ursula K. Le Guin was published by Small Beer Press in 2003. A part of the translated work appeared in the American anthology Starlight 2.

She also produced many works before Kalpa Imperial, including the collections Opus dos [Opus two, 1967], Bajo las jubeas en flor [Under the Flowering Jubeas,1973], and Casta Luna Electrónica [Chaste Electric Moon, 1977]. She was a science fiction author noted for her work on the inequality of power between men and women. She focused on powerful people and corrupt rulers in her writing.

Gorodischer was author of two novels within the genre of detective fiction. Her detective character is a grand dame who reluctantly and haphazardly engages in the world of international intrigue, making her debut in her 1985 novella entitled Floreros de alabastro, alfombras de Bokhara, which won the Emecé Literary Prize (1984–85) by unanimous decision. This detective character reappeared later in a different form in Jugo de mango (1988).

In an interview with Small Beer Press, Gorodischer says she was an avid reader from a young age. When asked her favorite authors she replied "Borges, of course. Borges always. Balzac, also, always. Alejo Carpentier, Clarice Lispector, Armonía Somers, Juan Rulfo, Mercè Rodoreda, Grace Paley, Marcel Proust. Oh, so many people, so many!".

She received the World Fantasy Award for Life Achievement in 2011. In 2014 she received a Special Mention Konex Award for her career achievements. In addition to her literary awards, Gorodischer received the Dignity Award from the Permanent Assembly for Human Rights because of her work for women's rights.

Angélica Gorodischer died on 5 February 2022, at the age of 93.

== Novels ==
- Opus dos. Buenos Aires: Ediciones Minotauro, 1967.
- Kalpa imperial. Buenos Aires: Ediciones Minotauro, 1983.
- Floreros de alabastro, alfombras de Bokhara. Lyndhurst, NJ: Lectorum Publications, 1985.
- Jugo de mango. Buenos Aires: Emecé Editores, 1988.
- Fábula de la virgen y el bombero. Buenos Aires: Editiones de la Flor, 1993.
- Mujeres de palabra. San Juan: University of Puerto Rico Press, 1994.
- Prodigios. Barcelona: Ed. Lumen, 1994.
- La noche del inocente. Buenos Aires: Emecé Editores, 1996.
- Menta (1st ed.). Buenos Aires: Emecé Editores. 2000. ISBN 978-950-04-2187-4.
- Tumba de jaguares. Buenos Aires: Emecé Editores, 2005.
- A la tarde, cuando llueve (1. ed.). Buenos Aires: Emecé. 2007. ISBN 978-950-04-2913-9.
- Tres colores (1a ed.). Buenos Aires: Emecé. 2008. ISBN 978-950-04-3022-7.
- La cámara oscura (1a ed.). Buenos Aires Argentina: Emecé Editores. 2009. ISBN 978-950-04-3184-2.

== Collections ==
- Cuentos con soldados. Santa Fe: Premio Club del Orden, 1965.
- Las pelucas. Buenos Aires: Editorial Sudamericana, 1968.
- Bajo las jubeas en flor. Buenos Aires: Ediciones De La Flor, 1973.
- Casta luna electrónica. Buenos Aires: Ediciones Andrómeda, 1977.
- Trafalgar. El Cid Editor, Buenos Aires, 1979.
- Mala noche y parir hembra. Buenos Aires: Ediciones La Campana, 1983.
- Las repúblicas. Buenos Aires: Ediciones de la Flor, 1991.
- Técnicas de supervivencia. Rosario: Ed. Municipal Rosario, 1994.
- Cómo triunfar en la vida. Buenos Aires: Emecé, 1998.
- Las nenas. Buenos Aires: Emecé, 2016

== Translations into English ==
- "The End of a Dynasty." Chapter from Kalpa Imperial. Translated by Ursula K. Le Guin. In Starlight 2. Edited by Patrick Nielsen Hayden. New York: Tor, 1999.
- Kalpa Imperial: The Greatest Empire That Never Was. Translated by Ursula K. Le Guin. Small Beer Press, 2003. ISBN 978-1-9315-2005-8. Reissued by Penguin Modern Classics in 2026.
- Trafalgar. Translated by Amalia Gladhart. Small Beer Press, 2013. ISBN 978-1-6187-3032-9. Reissued by Penguin Modern Classics in 2026.
- Prodigies. Translated by Sue Burke. Small Beer Press, 2015. ISBN 978-1-6187-3099-2
- Jaguars' Tomb. Translated by Amalia Gladhart. Vanderbilt University Press, 2021. ISBN 978-0-8265-0140-0
