= Catherine Webb =

British writer (born 1986)

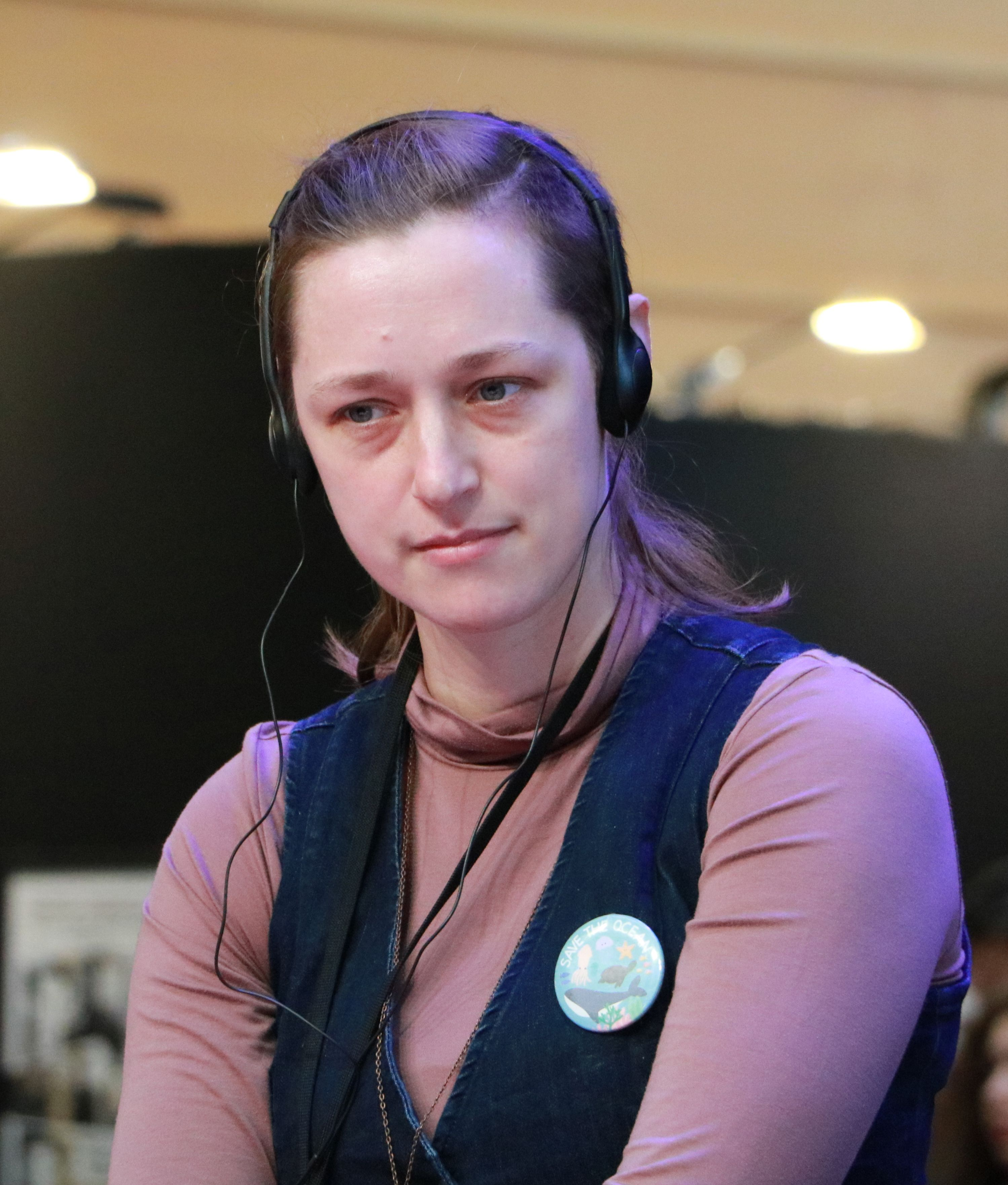
- Born: 27 April 1986 (age 40); United Kingdom
- Citizenship: UK
- Education: Godolphin and Latymer School; London School of Economics (BS); Royal Academy of Dramatic Art (GrDip)
- Occupation: Novelist
- Writing career
- Pen name: Kate Griffin; Claire North
- Language: English
- Genres: Fantasy, adventure, science fiction
- Notable works: The First Fifteen Lives of Harry August; Timekeepers; The Extraordinary and Unusual Adventures of Horatio Lyle; A Madness of Angels
- Notable awards: John W. Campbell Award (2015); World Fantasy Award (2017)

Catherine Webb (born 1986) is a British author. Under the pseudonym Kate Griffin, they write fantasy novels for adults. As Claire North, they write science fiction and novels based upon the work of Homer.

== Early life and education ==
They were 14 years old when they completed Mirror Dreams, which was written during their school holidays. Their father is author and publisher Nick Webb, and he suggested they should send the manuscript to an agent he knew, who eventually offered to represent them. The book was published in 2002 by ATOM Books.

Webb was educated at the Godolphin and Latymer School and the London School of Economics. They studied at the Royal Academy of Dramatic Art, from which they graduated in 2010.

== Career ==
After Mirror Dreams was published, Webb was named Young Trailblazer of the Year by the magazine CosmoGirl UK. Webb has published eight young adult novels, all with Atom Books. They appeared in interviews with CBBC and The Daily Telegraph when they were 15.

== Personal life ==
In a 2025 interview with The Fantasy Hive, Webb stated that they are non-binary and use "she/they" pronouns with a preference for "they". Webb is autistic.

== Publications ==
=== As Catherine Webb ===
- Mirror Dreams (2002)
- Mirror Wakes (2003)
- Waywalkers (2003)
- Timekeepers (2004)
- The Extraordinary and Unusual Adventures of Horatio Lyle (2006)
- The Obsidian Dagger: Being the Further Extraordinary Adventures of Horatio Lyle (2006)
- The Doomsday Machine: Another Astounding Adventure of Horatio Lyle (2008)
- The Dream Thief: An Extraordinary Horatio Lyle Mystery (2010)

=== As Kate Griffin ===
- A Madness of Angels (2009) (Matthew Swift series, book 1)
- The Midnight Mayor (2010) (Matthew Swift series, book 2)
- The Neon Court (2011) (Matthew Swift series, book 3)
- The Minority Council (2012) (Matthew Swift series, book 4)
- Stray Souls (2012) (Magicals Anonymous series, book 1)
- The Glass God (2013) (Magicals Anonymous series, book 2)

=== As Claire North ===
- The First Fifteen Lives of Harry August (2014)
- Touch (2015)
- The Gameshouse (2015)
- The Sudden Appearance of Hope (2016)
- The End of the Day (2017)
- 84K (2018)
- The Pursuit of William Abbey (2019)
- Sweet Harmony (2020) (Novella)
- Notes from the Burning Age (2021)
- The Songs of Penelope trilogy
  - Ithaca (2022)
  - House of Odysseus (2023)
  - The Last Song of Penelope (2024)
- Slow Gods (2025)
- As We Fall Through Time (2026)

== Awards and nominations ==
- 2005, Timekeepers nominated for the Carnegie Medal
- 2006, The Extraordinary and Unusual Adventures of Horatio Lyle nominated for the Carnegie Medal
- 2014, The First Fifteen Lives of Harry August (as Claire North) nominated for the BSFA Award for Best Novel
- 2015, The First Fifteen Lives of Harry August (as Claire North) nominated for the Arthur C. Clarke Award
- 2015, The First Fifteen Lives of Harry August (as Claire North) won the John W. Campbell Memorial Award
- 2017, The Sudden Appearance of Hope (as Claire North) won the World Fantasy Award—Novel
- 2026, Slow Gods (as Claire North) shortlisted for the Ursula K. Le Guin Prize
- 2026, Slow Gods (as Claire North) finalist for the Locus Award for Best Science Fiction Novel
- 2026, Slow Gods (as Claire North) finalist for the Dragon Award for Best Science Fiction Novel
- 2026, Slow Gods (as Claire North) won the 2026 Prix Utopiales, awarded by Les Utopiales International Science Fiction Festival.
