= Caragh Donley =

American writer and producer

- Occupations: Television producer; writer; journalist

Caragh Donley Tomashoff is an American television producer, writer, and journalist. In 2023, while working as senior producer on The Kelly Clarkson Show, she came out as a trans woman.

== Career ==
In the 1990s, Donley worked as a journalist and associate bureau chief for PEOPLE, covering pop culture and events including the murder trial of O. J. Simpson and the cast of the television show Beverly Hills, 90210. She later became a television producer and worked on The Queen Latifah Show and VH1's Behind the Music before becoming a senior producer for The Kelly Clarkson Show.

Donley also worked for TV Guide, The New York Times, The Los Angeles Times, The Boston Globe, Emmy Magazine, and Vanity Fair. She also authored the book The Can’t-idates: Running for President When Nobody Knows Your Name.

In April 2025, she performed in a one-woman show He Said, She Says as part of the New York City Fringe Festival, making her debut on April 5, 2025.

== Personal life ==
In 2023, Donley moved from Los Angeles to New York City. Later that year, she came out as a trans woman at sixty-three years old.

She is divorced and has two children.
