= Caragh M. O'Brien =

American novelist

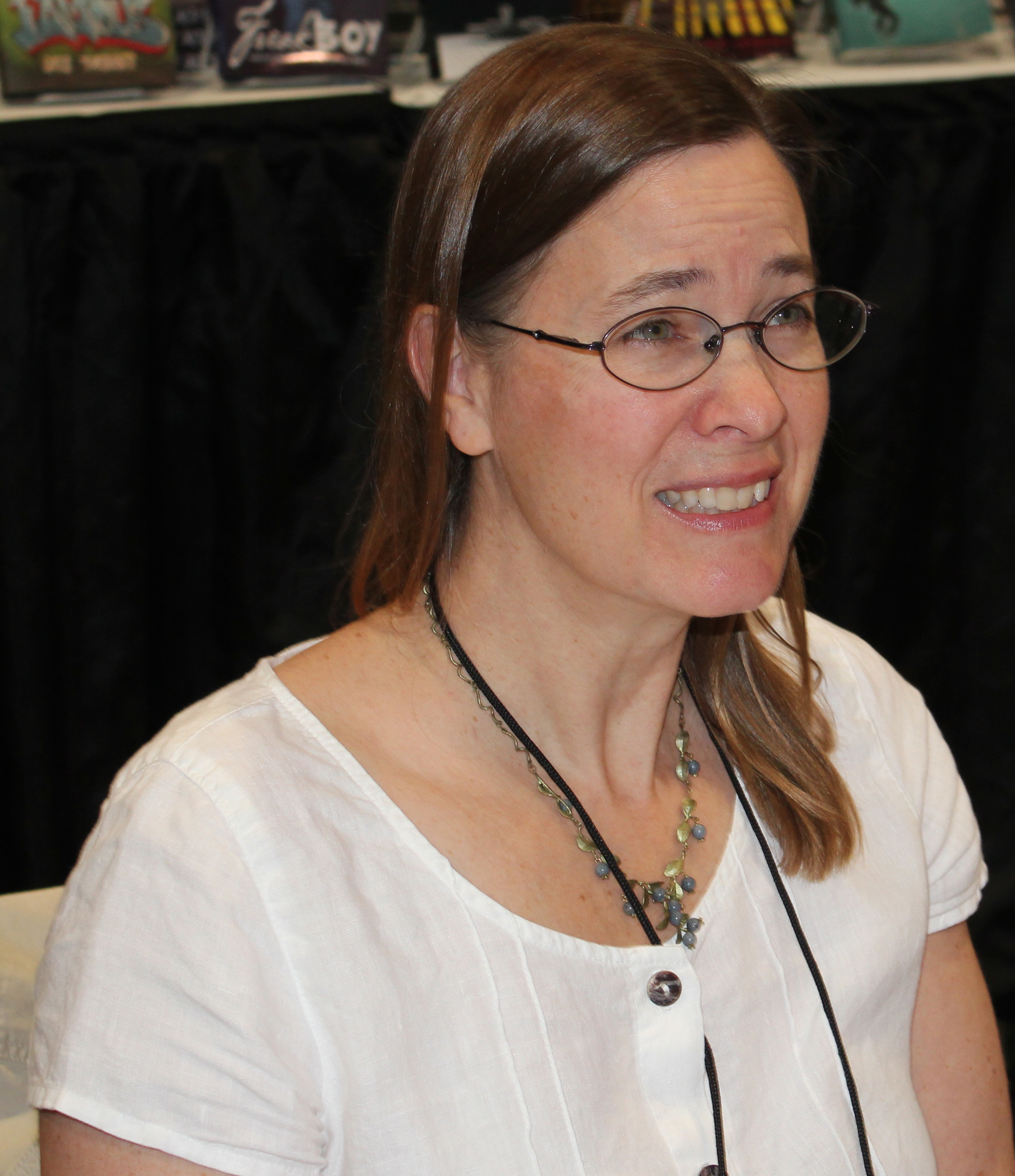
- O'Brien in 2014
- Born: Saint Paul, Minnesota, U.S.
- Education: Williams College (BS); Johns Hopkins University (MA)
- Children: 3
- Website: www.caraghobrien.com

Caragh M. O'Brien is an American novelist, best known as the author of the Birthmarked trilogy, a series of young adult, dystopian novels. Her books take place in a world destroyed by climate change. She also wrote an adult novel, Annie Bot, about a malfunctioning gynoid companion, under the pen name Sierra Greer.

== Early life ==
O'Brien was born in Saint Paul, Minnesota. She graduated from Williams College with a Bachelor of Science in physics, and earned her MA in the Writing Seminars at Johns Hopkins University.

== Career ==
Before becoming a full-time writer, O'Brien was a high school teacher. She also published romance novels.

In June 2025, O'Brien won the Arthur C. Clarke Award for best science fiction novel published in the UK for her novel Annie Bot, published under her pen name Sierra Greer.

== Personal life ==
O'Brien is married with three children; two sons and one daughter. She is one of seven children in her family and she has sixteen nieces and six nephews.

== Bibliography ==
=== Birthmarked Trilogy ===
- Birthmarked, Roaring Brook Press, 2010
- Prized, Roaring Brook Press, 2011
- Promised, Roaring Brook Press, 2012

Short stories in the Birthmarked universe:

- "Tortured", set between Birthmarked and Prized; published online at Tor.com, and in Fierce Reads: Kisses and Curses
- "Ruled", set between Prized and Promised; published online at Tor.com
- Additional tie-in stories are available from Caragh O'Brien's personal website

=== Vault of Dreamers Trilogy ===
- The Vault of Dreamers, Roaring Brook Press, 2016
- The Rule of Mirrors, Roaring Brook Press, 2016
- The Keep of Ages, Roaring Brook Press, 2017

=== As Sierra Greer ===
- Annie Bot, HarperCollins Mariner, 2024.
