= Neverness =

1988 novel by David Zindell

- Author: David Zindell
- Cover artist: Loretta Trezzo (limited ed.); Mick van Houten (Grafton ed.)
- Language: English
- Genre: Science fiction
- Publisher: Donald I. Fine (limited ed.), Grafton
- Publication date: March 1988
- Publication place: United Kingdom
- Media type: Print (Hardcover)
- ISBN: 0-917657-97-7 (limited ed.); 0-246-13435-6 (Grafton ed.)
- OCLC: 16867831
- Dewey Decimal: 813/.54
- LC Class: PS3576.I5183N4 1988
- Followed by: The Broken God

Neverness is a science fiction novel by American writer David Zindell, published in 1988. The related novelette "Shanidar" won the Writers of the Future contest in 1985. Zindell has said that it was partly based on Le Morte d'Arthur, with the pilots as "knights zipping around the universe in search of the Holy Grail".

== Synopsis ==
Neverness concerns a far-future world where interstellar travel is controlled by a group of mathematicians called pilots, because of their abilities to do the calculations needed for space travel, and posthuman or AI computer brains called "gods" rule much of the galaxy. It follows the deeds of Mallory Ringess, a young pilot, as he travels through the universe and discovers secrets and strangeness. He encounters a god, lives as a Neanderthal caveman, and eventually discovers that the lord of the pilots' order is thousands of years old and immortal, and that enlightened aliens have hidden profound secrets in humanity's genes.

== Reception ==
Mark Spencer praised the book for its unusual approach to showing an unfamiliar world, and the complexity of its story.

The novel won the Gigamesh Award for best novel in 1991, and Zindell was nominated for the Astounding Award for Best New Writer in 1986. Gene Wolfe described Zindell as "one of the finest talents to appear since Kim Stanley Robinson and William Gibson—perhaps the finest", and David Barrett described its style as "poetic prose that is a joy to read".
