= Arabesk trilogy =

Series of three novels by British author Courtenay Grimwood

The Arabesk trilogy is a sequence of alternate history novels by the British author Jon Courtenay Grimwood.

Starting with the 2001 novel Pashazade and continuing with Effendi (2002) and Felaheen (2003), the point of divergence occurs in 1914 with US President Woodrow Wilson brokering an earlier peace so that World War I never expanded outside the Balkans. The books are set in a liberal Islamic Ottoman North Africa in the 21st century, mainly centring on Alexandria, referred to as El Iskandriyah.

The central character, Raf, is an enigma. Genetically enhanced, frequently wired on various drugs, occasionally accompanied by the hallucinatory fox Tiriganiaq, and strongly conscientious in everything he does, Raf's past is as much a mystery as his future.

== Pashazade ==
Pashazade

ISBN 0-7434-6833-3 (shortlisted for the 2002 Arthur C. Clarke Award, BSFA award for Best Novel and John W. Campbell Memorial Award)

The first book centres on the arrival in Alexandria of Bey Ashraf al-Mansur, claimed to be the son of the Emir of Tunis. Shortly after his arrival, though, Raf's tendency to do exactly what he thinks is right leads to unexpected consequences. Between caring for his niece, Hani, and attempting to understand Zara, the girl he was to marry, Raf ends up suspected of his Aunt Nafisa's murder, running from the police as he tries desperately to work out who really killed her.

The main story is intercut with out-of-order flashbacks to Raf's past as a schoolboy in Swiss and Scottish boarding schools and as 'ZeeZee', a low-ranking agent of Hu San, an influential Triad boss in Seattle.

== Effendi ==
Effendi

Effendi was shortlisted for the BSFA award for Best Novel.

The second book opens with the discovery of a body near the mansion of billionaire Hamzah Effendi, Zara's father. As the new Chief of Detectives, Raf is obliged to investigate, he uncovers a past as a child soldier under the infamous Colonel Abad that Hamzah would rather forget. Meanwhile, as agents from Berlin, Washington, DC, and Paris battle diplomatically for influence over North Africa's most influential port, its nominal ruler, the young Khedive, is sent on holiday by the Governor General Koenig Pasha, whose cryptic notes Raf is left struggling to understand. The whole city hangs in the balance, and this time, Raf will need help to save it.

This novel includes a second narrative dealing with the young Hamzah's actions as a prepubescent soldier surviving famine and desert to carry out his lethal mission for the mysterious Abad.

== Felaheen ==
Felaheen

Felaheen was the winner of the BSFA award for Best Novel and shortlisted for the British Fantasy Award.

The third book starts with the near-death of the Emir of Tunis, forcing Raf to investigate the biggest mystery of all, his own origins. As the 11-year-old Hani races to get to the Emir's banquet, Raf is forced underground to discover the truth about his father. Kashif Pasha, the Emir's other son, is intent on removing any threat Raf might pose to his own claim to the throne, but he could get more than he bargained for if Raf's djinn-like abilities are as real as Hani thinks.

Frequent flashbacks tell the story of Sally Welham, Raf's mother, from New York to Tunis via Thailand as she sets out to get what she wants.
