= Boxer, Beetle =

2010 novel by Ned Beauman

First edition

Boxer, Beetle is a novel by British author Ned Beauman. It was first published by Sceptre on 5 August 2010. The novel was shortlisted for the Guardian First Book Award in 2010.

== Overview ==
The story is divided into two parallel arcs, one occurring in modern-day London and the other in 1930s England. The initial connection between the two narratives occurs in 2010 when a Nazi memorabilia collector discovers a hand-written note from Adolf Hitler. The letter is addressed to Doctor Erskine, a young aristocrat and eugenics researcher. Evidently, he had sent a gift to Hitler and it had been very well received. The finder of the note, "Fishy", so called because of a rare medical condition that causes the sufferer's sweat to smell of rotten fish, appeals to the users of a Nazi memorabilia message board to help in solving the mystery.

== Reception ==
The novel has received broadly positive reviews. Scarlett Thomas of The Guardian wrote that it was a "gripping and clever" story, and while the parts of the novel set in the modern day "occasionally strays too far into postmodern whimsy", the parts of the novel set in the 1930s are "wonderfully evoked, and [...] taut, thematically rich and extremely well written". She added that Beauman had successfully "take[n] an old and predictable structure and allow[ed] it to produce new and unpredictable connections." Keith Miller of The Telegraph described parts of the book as "very funny" with a "smooth narrative flow" and praised the relationship between Seth and Erskine, but believed that parts of the rest of the book were "narratively overdetermined". Rob Sharp of The Independent concluded that it was "a fine debut: clever, inventive, intelligently structured, genre-spanning, [...] and above all, an enjoyable, high-octane read through a fascinating period in history."
