= Sue Burke =

American writer and translator (born 1955)

- Born: 1955 (age 69–70)
- Occupations: Writer; translator
- Known for: Semiosis; Interference

Sue Burke (born 1955) is an American writer and translator. She has written the science fiction Semiosis trilogy, Semiosis (2018), Interference (2019), and Usurpation (2024). Semiosis attracted favorable attention and acclaim and appeared on numerous lists of the best books of 2018.

== Awards ==
In 2017, Burke received the Alicia Gordon Award for Word Artistry in Translation from the American Translators Association for her English translation of an excerpt from Joseph de la Vega’s Confusión de confusiones, written in Spanish in 1688. The book, the first analysis of stock markets ever written, was a commission from Bolsas y Mercados Españoles for an institutional gift.

== Personal life ==
Burke grew up in Milwaukee, Wisconsin and attended the University of Wisconsin. She moved with her husband, a trilingual businessman, to Madrid, Spain, in December 1999. She moved to Chicago in July 2016.

== Bibliography ==
=== Novels ===
- Semiosis trilogy
  - Semiosis (February 2018, Tor Books)
  - Interference (October 2019, Tor Books)
  - Usurpation (October 2024, Tor Books)
- Standalone
  - Immunity Index (May 2021, Tor Books)
  - Dual Memory (May 2023, Tor Books)

=== Short fiction ===
Stories

Title	Year	First published	Reprinted/collected	Notes
Who Won the Battle of Arsia Mons?	2017	Burke, Sue (November 2017). "Who won the Battle of Arsia Mons?". Clarkesworld. No. 134.		Novelette
Life from the Sky	2018	Burke, Sue (May–June 2018). "Life from the sky". Asimov's Science Fiction.		Novelette
"Summer Home"	2014	Burke, Sue (December 2014). "Summer home". Asimov's Science Fiction. 38 (12): 66–67.		

=== Translations ===
- Amadis of Gaul Book I (January 2012, BurglarHouse Books) – translation from the Spanish of Amadís de Gaula (1508) by Garci Rodríguez de Montalvo
- Gorodischer, Angélica (2015). Prodigies : a novel. Translated from the Spanish by Sue Burke. Easthampton, Mass.: Small Beer Press.
- Confusion of Confusions (December 2016, Comisión Nacional del Mercado de Valores) – translation from the Spanish of Confusión de Confusiones (1688) by Joseph de la Vega
- Amadis of Gaul Book II (September 2017, BurglarHouse Books) – translation from the Spanish of Amadís de Gaula (1508) by Garci Rodríguez de Montalvo
- Amadis of Gaul Book III (January 2018, BurglarHouse Books) – translation from the Spanish of Amadís de Gaula (1508) by Garci Rodríguez de Montalvo
- Canción Antigua – An Old Song: Anthology of Poems (April 2018) – with Christian Law, translation from the Spanish of poems by Vicente Núñez
- Amadis of Gaul Book IV (November 2018, BurglarHouse Books) – translation from the Spanish of Amadís de Gaula (1508) by Garci Rodríguez de Montalvo
