= A Requiem for Homo Sapiens =

Trilogy of science fiction novels by David Zindell

A Requiem for Homo Sapiens is a trilogy of science fiction novels by American writer David Zindell, made up of The Broken God (1993), The Wild (1995), and War in Heaven (1998). The trilogy is a sequel to the standalone novel Neverness (1988).

The series has been described as containing "some of the most striking writing, vivid spectacles, memorable characters, and insightful presentations of philosophy and religion seen in SF for many a year." David Langford commented on similarities between the trilogy's hero Danlo and Paul Atreides, protagonist of Frank Herbert's Dune.

== Books ==
=== The Broken God ===
Set 10 years after the events of Neverness, and narrated by its protagonist, Mallory Ringess, this book tells the story of the early life of his son, Danlo. After Danlo's tribe, the Devaki, is destroyed by a plague, he undertakes a perilous journey to Neverness City, where he is taken in and instructed by an alien Fravashi named "Old Father", joins the Academy, and becomes a pilot like his father. A new religion forms around the various tales told about Mallory Ringess, and Danlo comes into conflict with his former friend, Hanuman li Tosh, who assumes control of the "Way of Ringess" for his own purposes.

=== The Wild ===
Danlo's story continues as he explores the galaxy on a dual quest: first, to locate the home of the Architects of the Universal Cybernetic Church and persuade them to stop the Program of Increase that has resulted in the continual explosions of stars in the Vild (or Wild); and second, to find the cure for the engineered plague that killed the Devaki and will kill the rest of the primitive Alaloi back on Neverness. Like his father, Danlo penetrates the Solid State Entity and interacts with her. Based on her information, he seeks out a remnant of the great cybernetic god Ede. With Ede's help, Danlo at last reaches the distant planet of Tannahill, home of the Architects. His coming sparks a bloody war between various factions. The defeated faction escapes with a star-killer weapon, headed for Neverness.

=== War in Heaven ===
Danlo rejoins the pilots who were commissioned to find Tannahill and discovers that Hanuman li Tosh has taken dictatorial control over Neverness, and has begun construction of his "Universal Computer". Fearing that this will excite the anger of the galaxy's other cybernetic "gods", the rest of the pilots mobilize the Civilized Worlds in a great war. Danlo returns alone to Neverness and, after a series of adventures, succeeds in toppling Hanuman, restoring order, and pointing the way for the rest of humanity to counteract the power of the "gods" by realizing its full potential.
