= David Zindell =

American writer (born 1952)

- Born: November 28, 1952 (age 73); Toledo, Ohio, U.S.
- Education: University of Colorado Boulder (BA)
- Occupation: Fiction writer
- Writing career
- Genre: Speculative fiction
- Website: davidzindell.com

David Zindell (born November 28, 1952) is an American science fiction and fantasy writer.

== Writing career ==
Zindell's first published story was "The Dreamer's Sleep" in Fantasy Book in 1984. His novelette "Shanidar" won the Writers of the Future contest in 1985 and gave rise to his first novel, Neverness (1988), a science fiction epic. It was followed by a sequel trilogy called A Requiem for Homo Sapiens (1992–1998). He since added new books to the Neverness universe; in 2023 The Remembrancer's Tale, and The Scryer’s Tale will be published in 2027.

The Neverness universe has been hailed as Dune for the 1990s. Human civilization has explored and settled the galaxy using ships that interface a pilot's mind to the mathematical underpinnings of the physical universe. Artificial intelligences live as super-intelligent gods running on clusters of moon-sized computer brains. Humans have modified themselves to create a tapestry of religions and philosophies that interweave with alien cultures to amplify human potential and seek transcendence. The books often employ anthropological and ecological perspectives to examine the nature of consciousness, memory and evolution.

Zindell's fantasy epic The Ea Cycle (2001–2007) examines the evolution of consciousness through the struggle between good and evil, exploring themes of empathy, morality, war and fate. The plot concerns a prince named Valashu Elahad searching for a relic called the Lightstone to stop the immortal Morjin, Lord of Lies, who seeks to create a world filled with madness.

In 2015 he published Splendor, a memoir. In 2017 he published The Idiot Gods, a novel told from the point of view of killer whales, which are sapient. It is the first of the Xanayan series, followed by If I Am God in 2024 and The Woman and the Whale in 2025.

Zindell's work has been translated into German, Dutch, French, Spanish, Portuguese, Japanese, Russian and Italian.

== Reception and themes ==
John Clute wrote that Zindell was a "romantic, ambitious, and skilled" writer.

New Scientist wrote that: ‘David Zindell writes of interstellar mathematics in poetic prose that is a joy to read’ and that he presents ‘A disturbing vision of the impending collapse of a transgalactic society…the ideas are hard SF with philosophical undertones, and the story is compelling. Zindell makes you think’.

Zindell has described his style as an attempt to communicate the connectedness of things, the connection between mysticism and evolution, and the possibilities of life, and his fiction as an attempt to heal false dichotomies such as materialism and spirituality.

== Personal life ==
Zindell was born in Toledo, Ohio, and resides today in Boulder, Colorado, where he works as a test coach; he received a BA in mathematics and minored in anthropology at the University of Colorado Boulder.

== Publications ==
=== Fiction ===
==== Neverness universe ====
- "Shanidar", Writers of the Future (March 1985); online reprint at infinity plus
- Neverness (New York: D. I. Fine, 1988)
- A Requiem for Homo Sapiens (trilogy):
  - The Broken God (HarperCollins, 1992); United States ed., Bantam, 1994
  - The Wild (Harper Voyager, 1995); United States ed., Bantam, 1996
  - War in Heaven (Voyager, Bantam, 1998)
- The Remembrancer's Tale (Harper Voyager, 2023)
- The Scryer's Tale (Harper Voyager, 2027)

==== Ea Cycle ====
- The Lightstone (London: Harper Voyager, August 2001), (Tor Books, June 2006), also published as two volumes, The Ninth Kingdom (June 2006) and The Silver Sword (Voyager, 2002, Tor, 2887) and again together as The Lightstone: The Complete Novel (2022)
- Lord of Lies (Voyager, 2003); United States ed., Tor, 2008
- Black Jade (Voyager, 2005); released in U.S. only as e-book
- The Diamond Warriors (Voyager, 2007); released in U.S. only as e-book

==== Xanayan Novels ====
- The Orca's Song (originally published as The Idiot Gods, Harper Voyager, July 2017)
- If I am God (2024)
- The Woman and the Whale (2026)

==== Collections ====
- Shanidar and Other Stories (Bhodi Books, 2020)

==== Short fiction ====
- "The Dreamer's Sleep", Fantasy Book, December 1984
- "Shanidar", L. Ron Hubbard Presents Writers of the Future, 1985
- "Caverns", Interzone (UK), Winter 1985/86
- "When the Rose Is Dead", Full Spectrum 3, June 1991
- "Martian Compassion", The War of the Worlds: Fresh Perspectives, 2005
- "The Tiger", Shanidar and Other Stories, 2020

=== Nonfiction ===
- Read This (1994)
- Splendor – A Memoir (Bhodi Books, 2015)
