= Risk Everything =

2014 Nike advertisement campaign

- The Risk Everything campaign symbol
- Agency: Wieden+Kennedy
- Client: Nike
- Market: Global
- Language: English/multi-language
- Media: Television, print, hoarding, online
- Running time: During the 2014 FIFA World Cup
- Product: Nike Football
- Slogan: "Risk Everything."
- Preceded by: Write the Future
- Official website: nike.com/riskeverything

Risk Everything was an advertisement campaign created for American sports apparel company Nike by the American advertising agency Wieden+Kennedy. The advertisement campaign, spanning radio, television, out-of-home, online advertising and print media, was specially made for the 2014 FIFA World Cup and starring well-known football players from national teams and clubs. This campaign emphasizes the mantra of "risk everything" – taking every dangerous life-or-death chance to succeed and outshine your rivals.

== Concept ==
The campaign, created by ad agency Wieden+Kennedy, emphasizes risk-taking and what it takes to carry on a nation's hopes. The ads show players feeling the heat from intense neck-to-neck competition, fighting for glory and victory who suddenly arrive at a turning point in the football world – or match – and take a risk: giving an amateur the opportunity for a penalty kick or challenging perfect gameplay.

== Television ==
Nike released three television advertisements in the Risk Everything series across the United States, the United Kingdom and other European countries: Risk Everything, Winner Stays, and The Last Game

=== Risk Everything ===
Starring Portuguese footballer Cristiano Ronaldo, Brazil's Neymar and England's Wayne Rooney, the advertisement focuses on the pressure superstar players face when playing for their country in the FIFA World Cup. Ronaldo is surrounded by his fans – and advertisements depicting him – everywhere and Portugal's hopes seem to be riding on Ronaldo. Rooney, on the other hand, faces skepticism everywhere he goes and Neymar, who is wearing Brazil's prestigious number 10 shirt, is trying to live up to his country's football fanaticism, the legend of the players who wore the number 10 for Brazil and World Cup aspirations. The ad ends the three players walking with their team to the pitch, preparing themselves for the onslaught and the tagline "Pressure shapes Legends".

=== Winner Stays ===
A group of friends agree to a pick-up football match in a park, with the winning team getting to stay on the field. The players pretend to be (and transform into) players such as Cristiano Ronaldo, Neymar, Wayne Rooney, Zlatan Ibrahimović, David Luiz, Andrea Pirlo, Thibaut Courtois, Gonzalo Higuaín, Eden Hazard, Gerard Piqué, Andrés Iniesta, Mario Götze, Thiago Silva, Frank Ribery and Tim Howard. The ad features cameos by Irina Shayk, Kobe Bryant, Jon Jones, Anderson Silva, Rick Baster and the Incredible Hulk. As the match nears the end with a 2–2 tie and a "next goal wins" scenario, a young boy takes the ball off Ronaldo, and with immense pressure upon him from people across the globe watching the match, scores the penalty by doing a panenka and wins the game for his team.

=== The Last Game ===
An animated feature created in collaboration with Passion Pictures, the ad shows the Scientist, promoter of "Perfect Inc.", giving a presentation on how football players are reckless in their game play and "take too many risks". He unveils clones, which are programmed for perfect, no-risk-taken football and focus on efficiency, accuracy, and risk mitigation by guaranteed results. The world of football (and sports) suffers from these clones, as they defeat the real players, put them out of business, and drive sports to near-extinction.

Retired Brazilian football legend Ronaldo, who is saddened by this state of football, watches a young boy practicing football tricks all alone and an interview of the Scientist, in which he expresses little regard for the players forced out of the game by the clones, which fires him up and embarks on a mission to save football. He rescues the now-forgotten players: Zlatan Ibrahimović, trying to sell copies of his autobiography I Am Zlatan Ibrahimović; Cristiano Ronaldo, who now works as a mannequin in "Sport-U-Gal" sports equipment store; Andrés Iniesta, now a farmer; Neymar and David Luiz, barbers at a beauty salon, trimming the hair of their clones; and Wayne Rooney, a fisherman. Along with Franck Ribéry and Tim Howard who were rescued off-screen, their spirits are raised by Ronaldo, who motivates them by showing them glimpses of their former glory and the death football is facing. The Players question if it is possible to defeat the clones, and Ronaldo declares it is possible due to their risk taking skills. The Players challenge the clones to a football match; the team with the first goal wins, and the losers quit football forever.

The Players outsmart the clones with their skills despite the Scientist activating a fail-safe which introduces more clones to the field; the match ends with Cristiano Ronaldo effortlessly scoring a goal. As the players celebrate and the Scientist sulks, the entire world cheers and human players start returning to sports. A jubilant Ronaldo looks at the players celebrating, and exclaims, "Clone that!"

== Internet ==
=== Ask Zlatan ===
On 9 March 2014, Nike organized a question-and-answer session on Twitter with then-Paris Saint-Germain striker Zlatan Ibrahimović; Twitter users asked questions to Ibrahimović by tweeting with the hashtag #DareToZlatan.
