= Aliya Whiteley =

British author (born 1974)

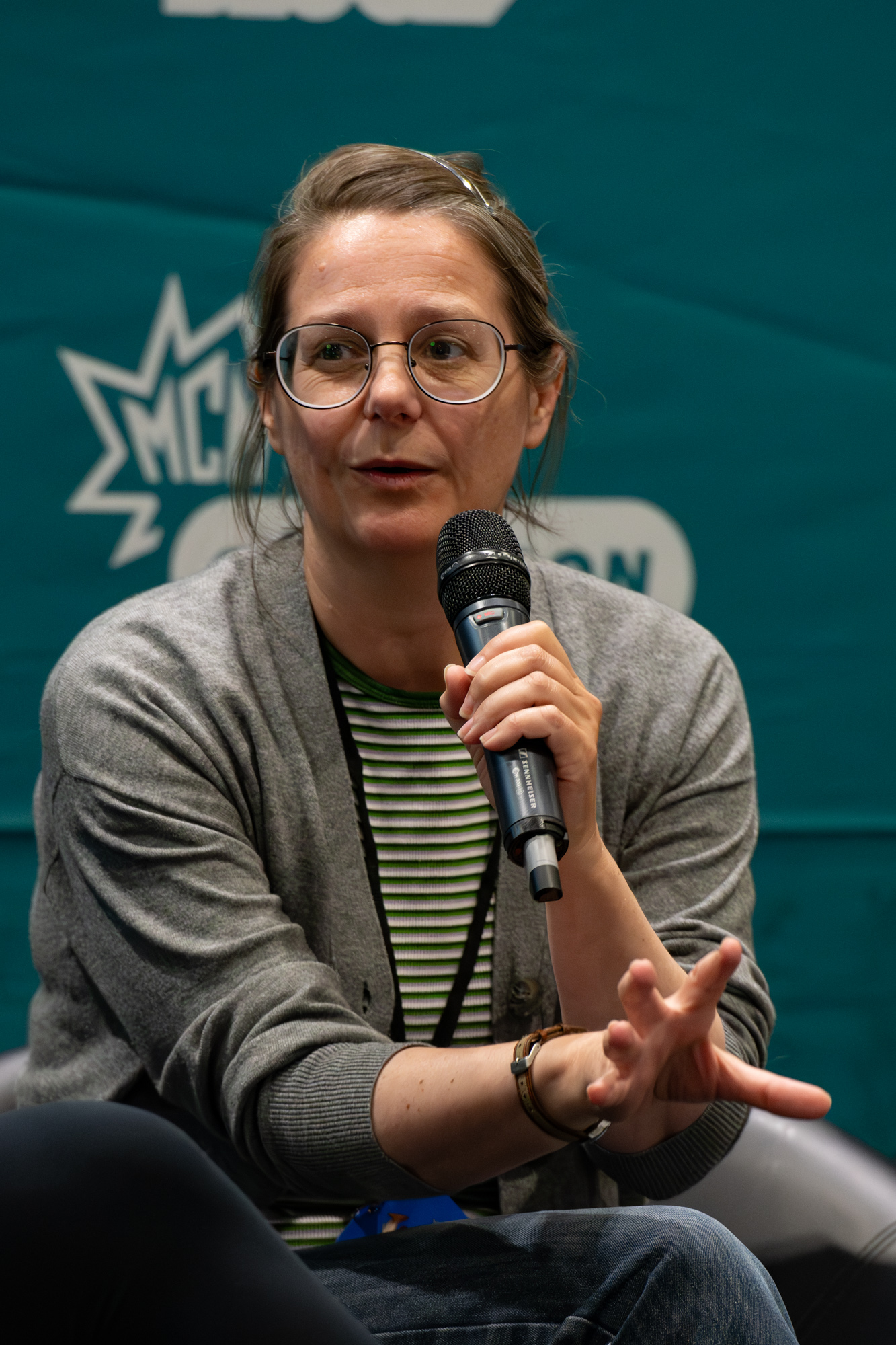
At the MCM Comic Con London, May 2025

Aliya Whiteley (born 1974) is a British novelist, short story writer and poet.

== Biography ==
Aliya Whiteley was born in Barnstaple, North Devon, in 1974 and grew up in the seaside town of Ilfracombe which formed the inspiration for many of her stories and novels. She graduated from Ilfracombe College in 1995, gaining a BA (Hons) degree in theatre, Film and Television Studies from the University of Wales, Aberystwyth.

In 2011 she was awarded an MSc in Library and Information Management by the University of Northumbria; her dissertation involved conducting a case study into the research techniques of modern novelists. She currently lives in West Sussex.

== Works ==
=== Novels ===
- Three Things About Me (2006)
- Light Reading (2008)
- The Loosening Skin (2018)
- Skein Island (2019)
- Skyward Inn (2021)
- Three Eight One (2024)
- City of All Seasons (2025) (with Oliver K Langmead)
- The Misheard World (2026)

=== Novellas ===
- Mean Mode Median (2004)
- The Beauty (2014)
- The Arrival of Missives (2018)

=== Short stories ===
- Witchcraft in the Harem (collection, 2013)
- "Sieve" (The Guardian 2004)
- "Sebastian Bugs" (Word Riot)
- "1926 in Brazilian Football" (Word Riot)
- "Penelope Napolitano and the Butterflies" (Strange Horizons)
- "Flushed" (3:AM Magazine)
- "Wingspan" (The Future Fire)
- "House of Infinite Diversions" (included in the anthology Strange Little Girls, 2016)
- "Territory Blank" (included in Best of British Science Fiction 2018)

== Awards ==
Whiteley's short story "Green River" was awarded second place in the 2012 British Fantasy Society Short Story Competition. Her novel The Loosening Skin was nominated for a British Fantasy Award in 2019.

Whiteley's Jelly Park won the Drabblecast 2007 People's Choice Award for best short story.

Three Eight One was the winner of the BSFA Award for Best Novel in 2025.

Her novel City Of All Seasons (written with Oliver K. Langmead) was nominated for the 2026 Aldiss Award.
