= Kitschies =

British literary prizes for speculative fiction

- Awarded for: Literary award
- Country: United Kingdom
- First award: 2009
- Final award: 2024
- Website: thekitschies.com

The Kitschies were British literary prizes presented annually from 2009 to 2024 for "the year's most progressive, intelligent and entertaining works that contain elements of the speculative or fantastic" published in the United Kingdom. The awards discontinued after November 2024 when the final winners were announced. The organisers said the award would discontinue due to the increasing and unsustainable amount of work it required of the volunteer staff.

== Awards and criteria ==
The Kitschies were administered by a non-profit association with the stated mission of "encouraging and elevating the tone of the discussion of genre literature in its many forms". The founders, Anne C. Perry and Jared Shurin, said that they sought to bring attention to works with a fantastic or speculative element that were progressive in terms of content and composition.

The award was a juried prize that selected the books which "best elevate the tone of genre literature." Qualifying books needed to contain "an element of the fantastic or speculative" and have been published in the UK. Winners received prize money and a textile tentacle trophy.

The Kitschies were initially established in 2009 by the website pornokitsch.com. The Kraken Rum was the sponsor between 2010 and 2013. For 2014 and 2015, Fallen London (a creation of UK game developer Failbetter Games) was the sponsor. The award did not run in 2016. From 2017 the sponsor was Blackwell's Bookshop.

For the last ten or eleven years of operation, the Kitschies were awarded in five categories:

- Red Tentacle for the best novel (£1,000, since 2009)
- Golden Tentacle for the best debut novel (£500, since 2010)
- Inky Tentacle for the best cover art (£500, since 2011)
- Invisible Tentacle for the best natively digital fiction (since 2014)
- Glentacle, awarded at the judges' discretion (since 2010, called "Black Tentacle" until 2020)

== Organisation ==
The judging panel changes annually and the unpaid directors have changed due to workload or illness. The number of submissions increased from 70 in 2009 to 234 in 2013.

For each year, the judges, directors, and the number of submissions for each year were as follows:

Year	Literary	Art	Natively digital fiction	Award Directors	Submissions
2009	Anne C. Perry and Jared Shurin	N/A	N/A	Jared Shurin and Anne C. Perry	70
2010	Anne C. Perry and Jared Shurin	N/A	N/A	Jared Shurin and Anne C. Perry	50
2011	Anne C. Perry, Jared Shurin, Lauren Beukes, and Rebecca Levene	Hayley Campbell, Craig Kennedy, Catherine Hemelryk, and Darren Banks	N/A	Jared Shurin	150
2012	Jared Shurin, Rebecca Levene, and Patrick Ness	Lauren O'Farrell, Gary Northfield, and Ed Warren	N/A	Jared Shurin	211
2013	Nick Harkaway, Catherine Webb, Will Hill, Anab Jain, and Annabelle Wright	Hazel Thompson, Sarah Anne Langton, Emma Vieceli, and Craig Kennedy	N/A	Glen Mehn	234
2014	Catherine Webb, Adam Roberts, Kim Curran, Frances Hardinge, and Glen Mehn	Ed Warren, Dapo Adeola, Jim Kay, and Siân Prime	Laura Grace, James Wallis, Phil van Kemenade, and Clwere Reddington	Glen Mehn	198
2015	Sarah Lotz, James Smythe, Nazia Khatun, Nikesh Shukla and Glen Mehn	Sarah McIntyre, Regan Warner, Dapo Adeola, and Lauren O'Farrell	John Wallis, Emily Short, and Rebecca Levene	Glen Mehn	176
2016	No award				
2017	Jon Courtenay Grimwood, Leila Abu El Hawa, Joshua Idehen, Alasdair Stuart, and Ewa Scibor-Rylska	Dapo Adeola, Sharan Dhaliwal, Jet Purdie, and Stuart Taylor	N/A	Glen Mehn and Leila Abu El Hawa	142
2018	Adam Roberts, Sharan Dhaliwal, Daniel Carpenter, Lucy Smee, and Matt Webb	Dapo Adeola, Lily Ash Sakula, and Maeve Rutten	N/A	Glen Mehn and Leila Abu El Hawa	178
2019	Catherine Webb, Kirsty Logan, Tasha Suri, Michaela Grey, and Alasdair Stuart	Kim Curran, James Spackman, Kaiya Shang, and Sharan Matharu	N/A	Leila Abu El Hawa and Anne Perry	196
2020	M. R. Carey, Clwere Rees, Mahvesh Murad, Kaiya Shang, and Daphne Lao Tong	Paul Wiseall, Fleur Clarke, Claire Richardson, and Jeffrey Alan Love	N/A	Leila Abu El Hawa and Anne Perry	177

== Recipients ==
All award information, unless otherwise referenced, is from the Kitschies Award's blog and tumblr, or from the sponsor Blackwell's website.

=== Red Tentacle (best novel) ===
Red Tentacle winners and finalists
Year	Author	Nominated work	Result	Ref
2009	China Miéville	The City & the City	Won	
2009	Joe Abercrombie	Best Served Cold	Nominated	
2009	Jane Austen (posth.) and Seth Grahame-Smith	Pride and Prejudice and Zombies	Nominated	
2009	Lev Grossman	The Magicians	Nominated	
2009	Reif Larsen	The Selected Works of T. S. Spivet	Nominated	
2010	Lauren Beukes	Zoo City	Won	
2010	Scott K. Andrews	Children's Crusade	Nominated	
2010	China Miéville	Kraken	Nominated	
2010	K. J. Parker	The Folding Knife	Nominated	
2010	Jean-Christophe Valtat	Aurorarama	Nominated	
2011	Siobhan Dowd and Patrick Ness	A Monster Calls	Won	
2011	Jesse Bullington	The Enterprise of Death	Nominated	
2011	China Miéville	Embassytown	Nominated	
2011	Jane Rogers	The Testament of Jessie Lamb	Nominated	
2011	Lavie Tidhar	Osama	Nominated	
2012	Nick Harkaway	Angelmaker	Won	
2012	Jesse Bullington	The Folly of the World	Nominated	
2012	Frances Hardinge	A Face Like Glass	Nominated	
2012	Adam Roberts	Jack Glass	Nominated	
2012	Juli Zeh	The Method	Nominated	
2013	Ruth Ozeki	A Tale for the Time Being	Won	
2013	Anne Carson	Red Doc	Nominated	
2013	Patrick Ness	More Than This	Nominated	
2013	Thomas Pynchon	Bleeding Edge	Nominated	
2013	James Smythe	The Machine	Nominated	
2014	Andrew Smith	Grasshopper Jungle	Won	
2014	Nina Allan	The Race	Nominated	
2014	William Gibson	The Peripheral	Nominated	
2014	Nnedi Okorafor	Lagoon	Nominated	
2014	Will Wiles	The Way Inn	Nominated	
2015	Margaret Atwood	The Heart Goes Last	Won	
2015	Dave Hutchinson	Europe at Midnight	Nominated	
2015	N. K. Jemisin	The Fifth Season	Nominated	
2015	Adam Roberts	The Thing Itself	Nominated	
2015	Hugo Wilcken	The Reflection	Nominated	
2016	No awards held			
2017	Nina Allan	The Rift	Won	
2017	Deon Meyer, translated by L. Seegers	Fever	Nominated	
2017	Jess Richards	City of Circles	Nominated	
2017	William Sutcliffe	We See Everything	Nominated	
2017	Michelle Tea	Black Wave	Nominated	
2018	Madeline Miller	Circe	Won	
2018	Becky Chambers	Record of a Spaceborn Few	Nominated	
2018	Simon Ings	The Smoke	Nominated	
2018	Tade Thompson	Rosewater	Nominated	
2018	Lavie Tidhar	Unholy Land	Nominated	
2019	Jan Carson	The Fire Starters	Won	
2019	Amal El-Mohtar and Max Gladstone	This Is How You Lose the Time War	Nominated	
2019	Vicki Jarrett	Always North	Nominated	
2019	Yōko Ogawa	The Memory Police	Nominated	
2019	Jane Rawson	From the Wreck	Nominated	
2020	Susanna Clarke	Piranesi	Won	
2020	Curdella Forbes	A Tall History of Sugar	Nominated	
2020	N. K. Jemisin	The City We Became	Nominated	
2020	Natasha Pulley	The Lost Future of Pepperharrow	Nominated	
2020	Kim Stanley Robinson	The Ministry for the Future	Nominated	
2021	No awards held			
2022	Becky Chambers	The Galaxy, and the Ground Within	Won	
2022	Zen Cho	Black Water Sister	Nominated	
2022	Un-su Kim, trans. by Sean Lin Halbert	The Cabinet	Nominated	
2022	Adrian Tchaikovsky	Bear Head	Nominated	
2022	Catriona Ward	The Last House on Needless Street	Nominated	
2023	W. P. Wiles	The Last Blade Priest	Won	
2023	Paul McAuley	Beyond the Burn Line	Nominated	
2023	E. J. Swift	The Coral Bones	Nominated	
2023	Mariana Enriquez translated by Megan McDowell	Our Share of Night	Nominated	
2023	Emily McGovern	Twelve Percent Dread	Nominated	
2024	Sandra Newman	Julia	Won	
2024	Martin MacInnes	In Ascension	Nominated	
2024	M. R. Carey	Infinity Gate	Nominated	
2024	Julianne Pachico	Jungle House	Nominated	
2024	Banana Yoshimoto	The Premonition	Nominated	

=== Golden Tentacle (best debut novel) ===
Year	Author	Nominated work	Result	Ref
2009	Not awarded			
2010	Maurice Broaddus	King Maker	Won	
2011	Kameron Hurley	God's War	Won	
2011	Douglas Hulick	Among Thieves	Nominated	
2011	Erin Morgenstern	The Night Circus	Nominated	
2011	Ransom Riggs	Miss Peregrine's Home for Peculiar Children	Nominated	
2011	Fred Venturini	The Samaritan	Nominated	
2012	Karen Lord	Redemption in Indigo	Won	
2012	Madeline Ashby	vN	Nominated	
2012	Jenni Fagan	Panopticon	Nominated	
2012	Rachel Hartman	Seraphina	Nominated	
2012	Tom Pollock	The City's Son	Nominated	
2013	Ann Leckie	Ancillary Justice	Won	
2013	Anne Charnock	A Calculated Life	Nominated	
2013	Monica Hesse	Stray	Nominated	
2013	Ramez Naam	Nexus	Nominated	
2013	Robin Sloan	Mr. Penumbra's 24-Hour Bookstore	Nominated	
2014	Hermione Eyre	Viper Wine	Won	
2014	Monica Byrne	The Girl in the Road	Nominated	
2014	Becky Chambers	The Long Way to a Small, Angry Planet	Nominated	
2014	Emmi Itäranta	Memory of Water	Nominated	
2014	Hanya Yanagihara	The People in the Trees	Nominated	
2015	Tade Thompson	Making Wolf	Won	
2015	A. Igoni Barrett	Blackass	Nominated	
2015	Kirsty Logan	The Gracekeepers	Nominated	
2015	Paul Meloy	The Night Clock	Nominated	
2015	Sara Taylor	The Shore	Nominated	
2016	No awards held			
2017	Alex Wells	Hunger Makes the Wolf	Won	
2017	RJ Barker	Age of Assassins	Nominated	
2017	Carmen Marcus	How Saints Die	Nominated	
2017	JY Yang	The Black Tides of Heaven	Nominated	
2017	Liz Ziemska	Mandelbrot the Magnificent	Nominated	
2018	Ahmed Saadawi	Frankenstein in Baghdad	Won	
2018	Tomi Adeyemi	Children Of Blood and Bone	Nominated	
2018	Sue Burke	Semiosis	Nominated	
2018	R. F. Kuang	The Poppy War	Nominated	
2018	Rebecca Ley	Sweet Fruit, Sour Land	Nominated	
2019	Clare Rees	Jelly	Won	
2019	Katie Hale	My Name Is Monster	Nominated	
2019	Wayétu Moore	She Would Be King	Nominated	
2019	Alix E. Harrow	The Ten Thousand Doors of January	Nominated	
2019	Rory Power	Wilder Girls	Nominated	
2020	Micaiah Johnson	The Space Between Worlds	Won	
2020	Kawai Strong Washburn	Sharks in the Time of Saviours	Nominated	
2020	Laura Jean McKay	The Animals in That Country	Nominated	
2020	Deepa Anappara	Djinn Patrol on the Purple Line	Nominated	
2020	Jordan Ifueko	Raybearer	Nominated	
2021	No awards held			
2022	Hilary Leichter	Temporary	Won	
2022	Caroline Hardaker	Composite Creatures	Nominated	
2022	Calvin Kasulke	Several People Are Typing	Nominated	
2022	Everina Maxwell	Winter's Orbit	Nominated	
2022	Xiran Jay Zhao	Iron Widow	Nominated	
2023	Julia Armfield	Our Wives Under the Sea	Won	
2023	Zain Khalid	Brother Alive	Nominated	
2023	Vauhini Vara	The Immortal King Rao	Nominated	
2023	Ray Nayler	The Mountain in the Sea	Nominated	
2023	Ayanna Lloyd Banwo	When We Were Birds	Nominated	
2024	Ayesha Manazir Siddiqi	The Centre	Won	
2024	Aubrey Wood	Bang Bang Bodhisattva	Nominated	
2024	Katy Hays	The Cloisters	Nominated	
2024	Emily Habeck	Shark Heart	Nominated	
2024	Deena Mohamed	Your Wish Is My Command	Nominated	

=== Inky Tentacle (best cover art) ===
Year	Work	Author	Artist(s)	Result	Ref
2009			Not awarded		
2010			Not awarded		
2011	The Last Werewolf	Glen Duncan	Peter Mendelsund (designer)	Won	
2011	Rivers of London	Ben Aaronovitch	Stephen Walter (illus.) and Patrick Knowles (design)	Nominated	
2011	The Prague Cemetery	Umberto Eco	Suzanne Dean (design) and John Spencer (illus.)	Nominated	
2011	Equations of Life	Simon Morden	Lauren Panepinto (design)	Nominated	
2011	A Monster Calls	Patrick Ness and Siobhan Dowd	Jim Kay (illus.)	Nominated	
2012	A Boy and a Bear in a Boat	Dave Shelton	Dave Shelton (illus.)	Won	
2012	The Teleportation Accident	Ned Beauman	La Boca (design)	Nominated	
2012	The Terrible Thing That Happened to Barnaby Brocket	John Boyne	Oliver Jeffers (illus.)	Nominated	
2012	Costume Not Included	Matthew Hughes	Tom Gauld (illus.)	Nominated	
2012	Flame Alphabet	Ben Marcus	Peter Mendelsund (design)	Nominated	
2013	The Age Atomic	Adam Christopher	Will Staehle (art)	Won	
2013	Dreams and Shadows	C. Robert Cargill	Sinem Erkas (design and illus.)	Nominated	
2013	Homeland and Pirate Cinema	Cory Doctorow	Amazing15 (design)	Nominated	
2013	Stray	Monica Hesse	Gianmarco Magnani (art)	Nominated	
2013	Apocalypse Now Now	Charlie Human	Joey Hi-Fi (art)	Nominated	
2014	Tigerman	Nick Harkaway	Glenn O'Neill (cover)	Won	
2014	The Ghost of the Mary Celeste	Valerie Martin	Steve Marking (design)	Nominated	
2014	A Man Lies Dreaming	Lavie Tidhar	Ben Summers (cover)	Nominated	
2014	Through the Woods	Emily Carroll	Emily Carroll and Sonja Chaghatzbanian (cover)	Nominated	
2014	The Book of Strange New Things	Michel Faber	Rafaela Romaya and Yehring Tong (cover)	Nominated	
2015	The Door That Led to Where	Sally Gardner	Jet Purdie (art direction and design)	Won	
2015	The Vorrh	Brian Catling	Pablo Declan (design)	Nominated	
2015	Monsters	Emerald Fennell	Jet Purdie (art design) and Patrick Leger (illus.)	Nominated	
2015	The Honours	Tim Clare	Peter Adlington (design and illus.)	Nominated	
2015	Get in Trouble	Kelly Link	Alex Merto	Nominated	
2016	No awards held				
2017	The History of Bees	Maja Lunde	Jack Smyth and the Simon & Schuster Art Department (cover)	Won	
2017	The Land of Neverendings	Kate Saunders	David Dean (illus.)	Nominated	
2017	Black Wave	Michelle Tea	Rose Stafford (illus.) and Hannah Naughton (design)	Nominated	
2017	The Real-Town Murders	Adam Roberts	Black Sheep (illus. and jacket design)	Nominated	
2017	Our Memory like Dust	Gavin Chait	Richard Shailer (design)	Nominated	
2018	Killing Commendatore	Haruki Murakami	Suzanne Dean (cover)	Won	
2018	The Book of Joan	Lidia Yuknavitch	Rafaela Romaya (design)	Nominated	
2018	The Smoke	Simon Ings	James Nunn (design)	Nominated	
2018	Squwere Eyes	Anna Mill and Luke Jones	Anna Mill and Luke Jones (design)	Nominated	
2018	Slender Man	Anonymous	Mike Topping (design)	Nominated	
2019	The Memory Police	Yoko Ogawa	Tyler Comrie (cover)	Won	
2019	Across The Void	S. K. Vaughan	Ceara Elliot (cover)	Nominated	
2019	The Heavens	Sandra Newman	Leo Nickolls (cover)	Nominated	
2019	Zed	Joanna Kavenna	Faber & Faber (cover)	Nominated	
2019	This Is How You Lose the Time War	Amal El-Mohtar and Max Gladstone	Greg Stadnyk (cover)	Nominated	
2020	The Arrest	Jonathan Lethem	Allison Saltzman (cover) and Dexter Maurer (illus.)	Won	
2020	Little Eyes	Samantha Schweblin	Ben Summers (cover)	Nominated	
2020	Monstrous Heart	Clair McKenna	Andrew Davis (cover)	Nominated	
2020	The Harpy	Megan Hunter	Lucy Scholes (cover) and Amy Judd (illus.)	Nominated	
2020	The City We Became	N. K. Jemisin	Lauren Panepinto (cover)	Nominated	
2021	No awards held				
2022	The Seep	Chana Porter	Julia Lloyd (art and design)	Won	
2022	Nightbitch	Rachel Yoder	Suzanne Dean	Nominated	
2022	Velvet Was the Night	Silvia Moreno-Garcia	Tim Green	Nominated	
2022	A Desolation Called Peace	Arkady Martine	Jaime Jones	Nominated	
2022	Iron Widow	Xiran Jay Zhao	Ashley Mackenzie	Nominated	
2023	Paper Crusade	Michelle Penn	Klara Smith	Won	
2023	Celestial	M. D. Lachlan	Nick Shah, Tomas Almeida, Joanna Ridley & Helen Ewing	Nominated	
2023	Motherthing	Ainslie Hogarth	Mark Abrams	Nominated	
2023	Poster Girl	Veronica Roth	Lydia Blagden	Nominated	
2023	The Seven Moons of Maali Almeida	Shehan Karunatilaka	Peter Dyer	Nominated	
2024	Out There Screaming	Jordan Peele & John Joseph Adams	Janay Nachel Frazier, Stuart Wilson & Arnold J. Kemp	Won	
2024	Julia	Sandra Newman	Luke Bird	Nominated	
2024	Lioness	[[Emily Perkins (novelist)|Emily Perkins]]	Greg Heinimann Design	Nominated	
2024	Remember, Mr Sharma	A. P. Firdaus	Nathan Burton	Nominated	
2024	The Vegan	Andrew Lipstein	Cecilia R. Zhang	Nominated	

=== Invisible Tentacle (best natively digital fiction) ===
Year	Author / Developer	Nominated work	Form of Media	Result	Ref
2014	Cardboard Computer written by Jake Elliott	Kentucky Route Zero Act III	video game	Won	
2014	Jeff Noon and others	@echovirus12	Twitter fiction	Nominated	
2014	Inkle Studios written by Meg Jayanth and Jon Ingold, directed by Joseph Humfrey and Jon Ingold	80 Days	video game	Nominated	
2014	Simogo	Sailor’s Dream	video game	Nominated	
2015	Dontnod Entertainment	Life Is Strange	video game	Won	
2015	Iain Pears	Arcadia	interactive novel	Nominated	
2015	@FrogCroakley	Daniel Barker’s Birthday	Twitter fiction	Nominated	
2015	BBC Writers Room	The Last Hours of Laura K		Nominated	
2015	Hidetaka Miyazaki / FromSoftware	Bloodborne	video game	Nominated	

=== Glentacle (Discretionary award previously called the Black Tentacle) ===
This award was called "Black Tentacle" until 2020, when it was renamed in memory of Kitschies co-founder Glen Mehn.

Year	Winner	Citation
2009	No award	
2010	Memory, novel by Donald Westlake.	"to recognize a novel that doesn't quite fit the award description but is so exceptional it merits the highest praise...noir, pure and simple, by a master of the genre … while we're sorry that Memory went unpublished while Westlake was alive, we're delighted that Hard Case brought the manuscript to light"
2011	SelfMadeHero, comics publisher	"for their 2011 body of work and their contribution to elevating geek culture"
2012	Lavie Tidhar, Charles Tan, and Sarah Newton	"for the World SF Blog, a website showcasing international speculative fiction"
2013	Malorie Blackman, British writer, Children's Laureate for 2013	"for outstanding achievement in encouraging and elevating the conversation around genre literature"
2014	Sarah McIntyre, author and illustrator	"for tireless work to promote the rights of artists and to encourage others to value their work"
2015	The genre community, personified by Patrick Ness	"for its response to the humanitarian refugee crisis" Ness began a fund that raised over £690,000 for Save the Children
2016	No awards held	
2017	No award	
2018	No award	
2019	Nazia Khatun, Claire North, and Leila Abu El Hawa	"for services to the SF/F community."
2020	Simon Key of the Big Green Bookshop in Hastings	"demonstrated extraordinary generosity and selflessness to readers, introducing and running his "Buy a Stranger a Book" initiative every Wednesday to allow readers to access books at a time that even libraries were closed."
2021	No awards held	
2022	Comma Press	"for their remarkable 'book of' and +100 series of anthologies"
