= Hopepunk =

Subgenre of speculative fiction

Hopepunk is a subgenre of speculative fiction, conceived of as the opposite of grimdark. Works in the hopepunk subgenre are about characters fighting for positive change, radical kindness, and communal responses to challenges.

== Origin ==
In 2017, fantasy author Alexandra Rowland proposed the term hopepunk as the opposite of grimdark, which is a subgenre that is particularly dystopian, amoral, or violent. Their initial Tumblr post, "The opposite of grimdark is hopepunk. Pass it on," received over 50,000 comments.

Rowland expanded the concept further in an article on the subject, "One Atom of Justice, One Molecule of Mercy, and the Empire of Unsheathed Knives." As more people engaged with the concept, the definition of hopepunk took on more specific parameters. The aesthetic of hopepunk is generally agreed to incorporate a mood of gentleness or softness and a sense of self-awareness of weaponized optimism, with a worldview that fighting for positive social systems is a worthwhile fight. There is an emphasis on cooperation as opposed to conflict. There is an awareness within hopepunk works that happy endings are not guaranteed and that nothing is permanent.

In 2019, hopepunk was one of Collins English Dictionary's new and notable terms. A 2022 BBC article further explored the concept, describing it as "a literary and artistic movement that celebrates the pursuit of positive aims in the face of adversity." It highlighted Rowland's perspective that "kindness and softness doesn't equal weakness" and identified works like The Lord of the Rings and The Handmaid’s Tale as examples of stories with hopepunk elements.

== Description ==
The various "-punk" subgenres are connected by the idea of social disruption. Hopepunk in speculative fiction explores resistance, rebellion, and resilience as counters to apathy and cynicism. Hopepunk describes works such as books, movies, and television shows, that reveal hope in the face of challenges and act as a counter to pessimism. Scholar Elin Kelsey describes it as "a narrative of positive resistance" and contrasts it with noblebright, which takes as its premise that not only are there good fights worth fighting, but that they are also winnable and result in a happy ending. Where noblebright is the narrative of the hero, hopepunk instead celebrates the collective response.

Rowland has pointed out that anger is also a part of hopepunk, saying "sometimes the kindest thing you can do for someone is to stand up to a bully on their behalf, and that takes guts and rage." Initially describing a subgenre, its use has extended to refer to motivations, narrative tone, outlook. The editors of Uncanny Magazine define it as "radical empathy" and "radical kindness", contrasting it to the hopelessness of grimdark. Rowland wrote that "Hopepunk isn’t pristine and spotless. Hopepunk is grubby, because that’s what happens when you fight." Although they may include horrible events, injustice, and inequality, hopepunk stories have characters who choose to act, rejecting pessimism and passivity. Positive human traits and community contribute to solutions.

Stories in the hopepunk subgenre reject the fatalism and cynicism of grimdark. Hopepunk characters persevere, believing in the possibility of something better in the face of difficult realities. Hopepunk is an approach in which characters choose to fight to make things better, and are motivated by noble motives. Some critics and fans considered the awards of both the Hugo Award and Nebula Award to The Calculating Stars by Mary Robinette Kowal as industry recognition of hopepunk literature. Hopepunk, a reaction to decades of dystopian, nihilistic fiction, explores how goodness and optimism can be acts of rebellion. A hopepunk narrative is driven by fierce caring and the will to fight for something. The worlds described in hopepunk works are not utopian or even necessarily hopeful; the genre is expressed in the ways characters approach issues.

When considered as a philosophical movement, hopepunk presents a model for surviving the contemporary exigencies of life and combatting complacency.

== Popularization ==
Hopepunk emerged during bleak sociopolitical times within a broader culture emphasis on extreme self-care, communal care, and wellness. In May, 2018, the Nebula Conference included a hopepunk panel. Vox described N. K. Jemisin's third Hugo Award in 2018 as real-world activism in the spirit of hopepunk, recognizing the themes of humanity and love in her work.

The state of the world around the 2020s (pandemic, climate change, economic and geopolitical crises) gave hopepunk a greater appeal to readers. Sales of young-adult dystopian fiction were in decline. In 2018, Cat Rambo, then the president of Science Fiction and Fantasy Writers of America, said that more nominees for the Nebula Awards featured "strong, feel-good elements" than in previous years.

Intended to describe a literary subgenre, people have used the term to describe films, politics, religion, and everyday activities. It has been popularized in discussions about "everything from politics to pregnancy", according to America magazine associate editor Jim McDermott. He posits that the foundation of the Catholic faith is a form of hopepunk.

In 2019, the BBC allocated £150,000 for hopepunk podcasts. BBC executive Jason Phipps says people want "detailed, diverse characters who are unafraid to be fighting for something, choosing hope even when things are bleak." A thriller called The Cipher was selected for its debut hopepunk podcast.

A paper in the International Journal of Educational Technology in Higher Education describes the hopepunk as a movement toward "speculating, changing, and bettering the world and its future(s) through its emphasis on optimism, cooperation, community-building, the rejection of apathy, and the embodiment of radical hope" and argues for its approach in directing futures in higher education.

In 2024, The Guardian highlighted hopepunk's influence beyond literature, describing how the concept inspired the video game Monument Valley 3. The article noted that the game drew on hopepunk themes, focusing on community and rebuilding together, aligning with the genre's emphasis on positive change in adversity.

== Criticism ==
In a 2021 paper, Cecilia Mancuso states that, as a science fiction genre, hopepunk fails to provide a clear and consistent definition, leading to the label being applied to disparate works. In an interview, journalist and author Annalee Newitz disputed that hopepunk is a genre, saying "Any kind of story can have elements of hopepunk". Newitz views hopepunk as the opposite of apathy. Lee Konstantinou, associate professor of English Literature at University of Maryland, College Park, is skeptical of the genre, saying "You can't just depict an imagined world ravaged by environmental disaster or war or oppression, and then sprinkle a little bit of hope at the end. Hope has to be earned."

Some critics have called hopepunk "pious", "sentimental", and "microaesthetics with marketing ambitions".

== Examples ==
The Goblin Emperor by Katherine Addison has been described as the "quintessential hopepunk fantasy novel". Other science fiction books that have been characterized as hopepunk include The Long Way to a Small, Angry Planet and A Prayer for the Crown-Shy by Becky Chambers. Additionally, Harry Potter by J. K. Rowling, and The Lord of the Rings by J. R. R. Tolkien have been described as hopepunk.

Beyond science fiction books, the term hopepunk has been applied to television shows, movies, and fictional characters. The Den of Geek hopepunk explainer gives examples such as Snowpiercer, when Curtis blows up the train; Mad Max: Fury Road, when Max and Furiosa return to the Citadel; and The Expanse, when Naomi allows desperate refugees from Ganymede aboard Rocinante. Other examples include fictional character Jean-Luc Picard in the Star Trek franchise and Doctor Who.

== See also ==
- Solarpunk
- Cottagecore
- Hygge
