= A Psalm for the Wild-Built =

2021 novella by Becky Chambers

- First edition
- Author: Becky Chambers
- Cover artist: Fei Fei Ruan
- Language: English
- Series: Monk & Robot #1
- Genre: Science fiction, solarpunk
- Publisher: Tor.com
- Publication date: July 13, 2021
- Publication place: United States
- Pages: 160
- ISBN: 9781250236210 (1st ed hardcover)
- OCLC: 1240266570
- Dewey Decimal: 813/.6
- LC Class: PS3603.H347 P73 2021
- Followed by: A Prayer for the Crown-Shy

A Psalm for the Wild-Built is a 2021 solarpunk novella written by American author Becky Chambers, published by Tor Books on July 13, 2021. It is the first book in the Monk & Robot duology, followed by A Prayer for the Crown-Shy, which was released on July 12, 2022. It won the Hugo Award in 2022.

== Background ==
In 2018, for its Tor.com Publishing imprint, Tor Books commissioned science fiction author Becky Chambers to write a two-book novella series in the emerging solarpunk genre. Chambers's debut novel, The Long Way to a Small, Angry Planet (2014), and its sequel, A Closed and Common Orbit (2016), in the Wayfarers series, had both been nominated for the Arthur C. Clarke Award; she would continue writing that series as she worked on these new solarpunk novellas. By the time of the first novella's release in 2021, the 36-year-old Chambers, living in northern California, had won the Hugo Award for Best Series for the Wayfarers series whose fourth novel, The Galaxy, and the Ground Within, had been published earlier that year.

== Synopsis ==
On a habitable moon called Panga, AI and robots used to have a central role in the urbanized, industrialized society. However, several hundred years ago, the robots left human society and disappeared to the wilderness. Without their AI and robot workers and high-tech automated factories, the humans switch to a sustainable solarpunk lifestyle, with farms and small communities.

Dex, a non-binary tea-serving monk, is traveling around the human-populated areas of their moon, going from one community to another. Dex's goal is to meet villagers and townsfolk and custom-blend tea to fit the people's needs and personalities. In addition to being an act of service, Dex also uses tea serving as an "ice-breaker" to enable people to confide their misgivings and concerns to them.

One day, Dex, seeking a change in their routine, travels far beyond the agrarian communities into the unsettled wilderness. They are shocked to encounter a robot, as humans have not seen robots for centuries, ever since the robots left for the wild. The robot, named Splendid Speckled Mosscap, joins Dex on a road trip deeper into the wilderness to find an abandoned monastery. Dex and Mosscap are both searching to find "What do people need?"

== Publication ==
The novella was published by the Tom Doherty Associates division of Macmillan Publishers and released on July 13, 2021, as a hardcover, ebook and audiobook. Its 4 hour long audiobook is narrated by Emmett Grosland.

== Major themes ==
The setting of the story, Panga, is seen undergoing rewilding. The story also depicts humans and robots having independence from one another, while issues such as overpopulation and oil overusage taking up landscape are seen in the foreground. Also touched on are issues of therapy, satisfaction and finding a purpose.

== Reception ==
Critics praised the novella as a feel-good, "joyful experience" with Jacob Aron of New Scientist saying that it left a "warm, fuzzy feeling inside" after reading. Publishers Weekly enjoyed the "characteristic nuance and careful thought" offered by Chambers, touching on the way A Psalm for the Wild-Built was a "cozy, wholesome meditation on the nature of consciousness and its place in the natural world." Writer Amal El-Mohtar criticized "moments...found jarring in their familiarity, where the thing depicted is so fundamentally at odds with the society Dex seems to inhabit that [it feels] dislocat[ing]." She found that seeing issues such as social media usage being pitted against "Dex's world of generosity and equity" was jarring, but praised the hopeful and optimistic tone all the same.

== Awards ==
| Year | Award | Category | Result | Ref |
|---|---|---|---|---|
| 2021 | Nebula Award | Novella | Shortlisted | |
| 2022 | Hugo Award | Novella | Won | |
| 2022 | RUSA CODES Reading List | Fantasy | Won | |
| 2023 | Grand Prix de l'Imaginaire | Novella étrangère | Shortlisted | |
| 2025 | Kurd Laßwitz Award | Foreign Work | Won | (Note: Awarded to the two volume series) |
