= Record of a Spaceborn Few =

2018 science fiction novel by Becky Chambers

- First edition (US)
- Author: Becky Chambers
- Language: English
- Series: Wayfarers series
- Genre: Science fiction
- Publisher: Harper Voyager (US); Hodder & Stoughton (UK)
- Publication date: 2018
- Publication place: United States
- Pages: 368
- ISBN: 978-1473647640
- Preceded by: A Closed and Common Orbit
- Followed by: The Galaxy, and the Ground Within

Record of a Spaceborn Few is a 2018 science fiction novel by Becky Chambers, published by Harper Voyager in the US and Hodder & Stoughton in the UK. It is a sequel to The Long Way to a Small, Angry Planet and A Closed and Common Orbit.

== Synopsis ==
The novel explores life in the Exodus fleet that was mentioned in passing in the preceding books, from the viewpoint of five characters: Tessa (sister of Ashby from The Long Way to a Small, Angry Planet), a laborer and mother to two children; Kip, a restless teenager; Isabel, an elderly archivist; Sawyer, a recent immigrant; and Eyas, a "caretaker" who performs Exodan funerary practices.

== Reception ==
Record of a Spaceborn Few was a finalist for the Red Tentacle (Best Novel) at the 2018 Kitschies and the 2019 Hugo Award for Best Novel.

| Year | Award | Category | Result | Ref |
|---|---|---|---|---|
| 2018 | BSFA Award | Novel | Longlisted | |
| 2018 | Goodreads Choice Awards | Science Fiction | Nominated—11th | |
| 2018 | Kitschies | Red Tentacle (Novel) | Shortlisted | |
| 2019 | Dragon Award | Science Fiction Novel | Shortlisted | |
| 2019 | Hugo Award | Novel | Shortlisted | |
| 2019 | Locus Award | Science Fiction Novel | Nominated—4th | |
