= The Space Between Worlds =

Science fiction novel by Micaiah Johnson

- Author: Micaiah Johnson
- Language: English
- Genre: Science Fiction; Dystopian fiction; Romance
- Publisher: Del Rey
- Publication date: 4 August 2020
- Pages: 336
- Awards: Compton Crook Award (2021); The Kitschies Golden Tentacle (2021); The Subjective Chaos Kind of Awards Best Science Fiction (2021)
- ISBN: 9780593135051

The Space Between Worlds is a 2020 science fiction novel by Micaiah Johnson. It is Johnson's debut novel. The novel takes place in the near future, where travel between parallel universes is possible.

== Setting and synopsis ==
The Space Between Worlds centers on Cara, a young woman who works as a 'traverser', someone who is able to travel to an Earth in a parallel universe. Travel is only possible if the traveler is already dead on the destination Earth. Due to growing up in a dystopian wasteland, most versions of Cara are already dead, making her uniquely able to traverse to numerous worlds. Cara refers to poor and disadvantaged people like herself as "trash people".

The narrative takes place in two settings, each of which is visited across multiple universes: the upscale, corporate Wiley City and Ashtown, Cara's downtrodden hometown set in the wasteland. The story explores Cara's multiple relationships across different versions on different Earths: with her family, with the emperor of the wasteland, and with her watcher Dell, with whom Cara fears the class distance between them would keep a romantic relationship from ever forming.

== Reception ==
The New York Times praised The Space Between Worlds, calling it "profoundly satisfying" and a metaphor for neoliberal imperialism. New Scientist said it was a "witty, deep and savvy tale about traveling through the multiverse", comparing it to Terry Pratchett and Stephen Baxter's The Long Earth and Luiza Sauma's Everything You Ever Wanted. The Nerd Daily praised the spiritual convictions of the traversers, and their belief in the "goddess Nyame who guides them across different universes, that it is she who they feel in that space between worlds".

=== Awards ===
The Space Between Worlds won the following awards:

Awards won by The Space Between Worlds
Year (awarded)	Award	Category	Result	Ref
2020	Goodreads Choice Awards	Fantasy	4th Place	
2021	Compton Crook Award	—	Won	
2021	The Kitschies	Golden Tentacle (debut novel)	Won	
2021	Subjective Chaos Kind of Awards	Best Science Fiction	Won	
2021	Locus Award	Best First Novel	Final	

== Themes ==
Identity is a central thematic element in The Space Between Worlds. The narrative explores how choice and circumstance influence one's personality and life. The novel also examines "borders, crossings, and interstices": between parallel universes, between communities, and between people. The novel was cited for reflecting "the diversity inherent in our society—social, racial, sexual, and religious."
