= The Galaxy, and the Ground Within =

2021 novel by Becky Chambers

- First edition
- Author: Becky Chambers
- Language: English
- Series: Wayfarers series
- Genre: Science fiction
- Publisher: Harper Voyager (US); Hodder & Stoughton (UK)
- Publication date: 2021
- Publication place: United States
- Pages: 336
- ISBN: 978-0062936035
- Preceded by: Record of a Spaceborn Few

The Galaxy, and the Ground Within is a 2021 science fiction novel by Becky Chambers, published by Harper Voyager. It is a sequel to The Long Way to a Small, Angry Planet, A Closed and Common Orbit and Record of a Spaceborn Few.

== Synopsis ==
The novel takes place at the Five-Hop One-Stop, a refueling and licensing station located on the planet Gora, which had no life on it before it was settled by the various alien races who set up shop there. Gora was settled only because of its close proximity to a transit hub where several tunnels meet. A technical failure causes nearly all of the satellites in orbit around Gora to crash and all traffic is halted for several days. The five protagonists are trapped together in the Five-Hop One-Stop for several days and end up confronting their similarities, differences, prejudices and personal challenges.

== Main characters ==
- Pei, an Aeluon, is a cargo runner on her way to meet her secret lover Ashby, the human captain of the Wayfarer from The Long Way to a Small, Angry Planet.
- Speaker, an Akarak, is a trader who helps other members of her species, which has a difficult history.
- Roveg, a Quelin, is an exiled artist on his way to see his children for the first time in many years.
- Ouloo, a Laru, is the owner of the Five-Hop One-Stop, the place where nearly all of the novel takes place.
- Tupo, a Laru, is Ouloo's child who assists in running the Five-Hop One-Stop.
- Tracker, an Akarak, is Speaker's twin sister who stays on their ship in orbit during the events of the novel.

== Reception ==
Vanessa Armstrong at Tor.com noted that "While it’s likely Chambers started this book before the events that were 2020, a post-pandemic (well, almost post, hopefully) reading can’t help but resonate with our own unexpected pause, how an unplanned and undesired halt to where we think we’re going can change things irrevocably."

Publishers Weekly noted "There are some real moments of anxiety to keep the pages turning, but the highlights are the characters’ meaty debates and Chambers’s delightful exploration of cultural difference."

The novel was a finalist for the 2022 Hugo Award for Best Novel.
