= To Be Taught, If Fortunate =

2019 science fiction novel by Becky Chambers

- First edition
- Author: Becky Chambers
- Language: English
- Genre: Science fiction
- Publisher: Hodder & Stoughton
- Publication date: 2019
- Pages: 153
- ISBN: 978-0062936011

To Be Taught, If Fortunate is a 2019 science fiction novella by Becky Chambers set in the 22nd century featuring speculative astrobiology. It follows four scientists as they explore habitable worlds 15 light years from Earth.

== Development ==
Chambers wrote the novel out of a desire to see "real people" centered in a narrative that takes place in space, as science fiction generally focuses on what she refers to as "the elite".

The title phrase comes from the opening audio recording on the Voyager Golden Record, spoken by Kurt Waldheim, Secretary-General of the United Nations, and launched into space in 1977:

I send greetings on behalf of the people of our planet. We step out of our solar system into the universe seeking only peace and friendship, to teach if we are called upon, to be taught if we are fortunate. We know full well that our planet and all its inhabitants are but a small part of the immense universe that surrounds us and it is with humility and hope that we take this step.

== Style ==
To Be Taught, If Fortunate is told in epistolary style, narrated by the crew leader Ariadne as she directly addresses the reader. It is novella-length.

== Synopsis ==
To Be Taught, If Fortunate follows four astronauts -- Ariadne, Chikondi, Elena, and Jack -- as they travel beyond the Solar System on a research mission to document extraterrestrial life on four planets. The explorers are put into suspended animation for extended periods of time while they travel between the planets. The book chronicles their adventures and explores how they decide what is important to them. As they leave the second planet, they realize that they have received no communication from Earth for months; as they arrive at the fourth, they receive a message indicating that a natural disaster has crippled Earth's technological capability, rendering them potentially the last astronauts. They decide to send a message back to Earth to ask whether they should return as planned, or head outward to explore more planets; if they never receive an answer, they will remain in suspended animation indefinitely.

=== Somaforming ===
The novella develops the fictional idea of somaforming, the process by which the crew adapt their DNA to the diverse environments they encounter on each planet. While they are in deep sleep, their bodies gain new traits for the particular situation they are in, from higher gravity to a new atmosphere. In one instance, their blood produces antifreeze in order to adapt to a colder temperature.

== Principal characters ==
Ariadne is the narrator of the novella. She is the leader and crew engineer. Chikondi, Elena, and Jack are her crew members, and they are in a communal relationship. She sometimes has sexual relationships with Jack and Elena.

Chikondi is the youngest and specializes in plants and biology. He is asexual, and he has a close, non-sexual bond with Ariadne.

Elena is the eldest and a meteorologist. She has traditionally masculine personality traits; at times, she can be aloof and focused on accomplishing the task at hand.

Jack is a handsome geologist who specializes in rocks and fossils. He is a transgender man who takes hormones during his sormaforming.

== Reception ==
Emily St. James, writing for Vox, praised the novella as a "quick read [...] but ultimately a rewarding one, as it considers what it is that makes us human on both an individual and a collective level".

Lee Mandelo, writing for Reactor, says:

Chambers's brief tale is intimate but vast, wondrous and simple, crafted with technical precision toward a purposeful argument about human progress, science, and the small personal futures that create grand-scale futurity.

== Awards ==
- Nominated for the Hugo Award for Best Novella in 2020.
- Listed as one of the five best First Contact books on SciFiNow.
