= Becky Chambers =

American science-fiction writer (born 1985)

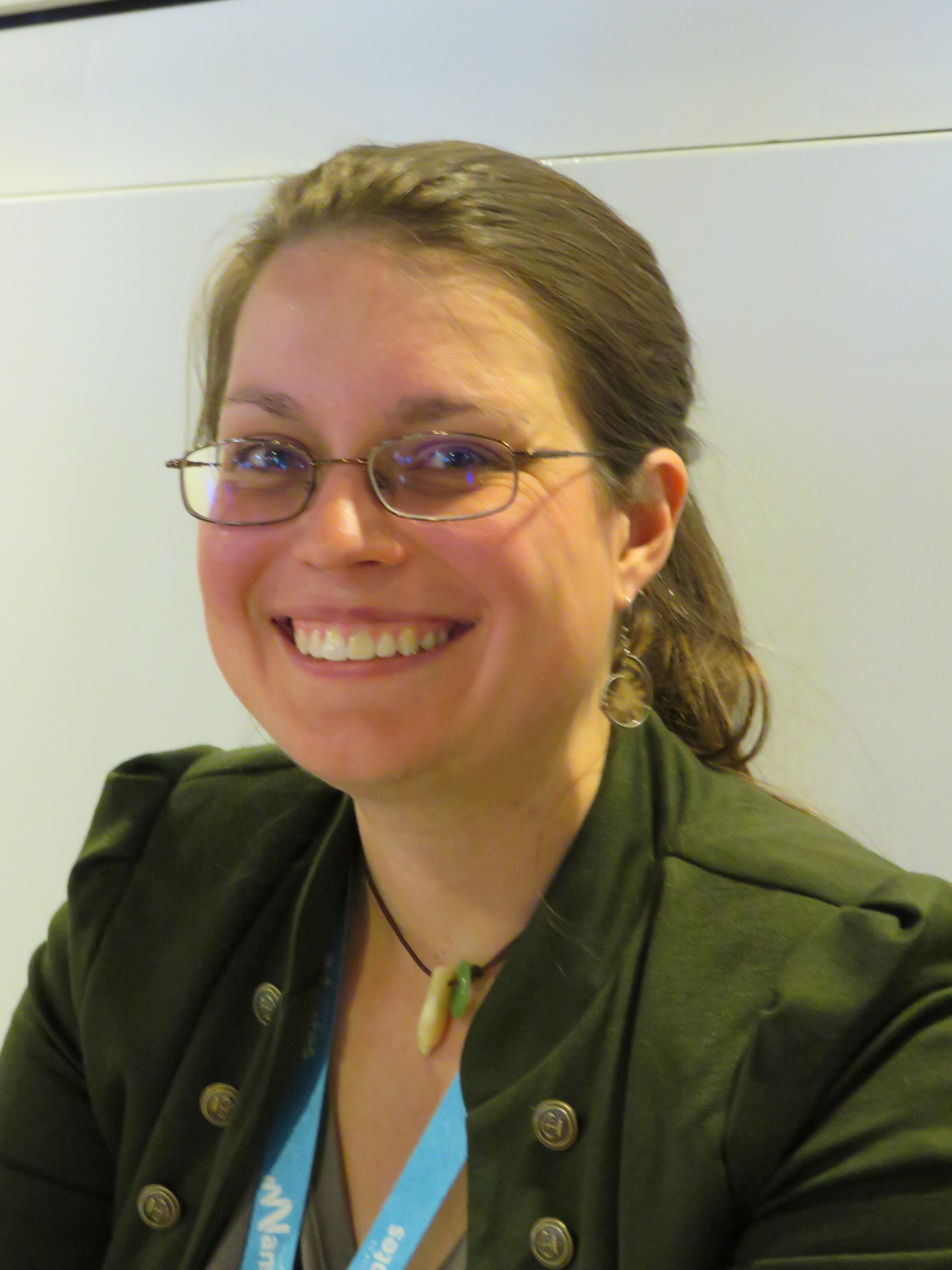
- Born: Rebecca Marie Chambers; May 3, 1985 (age 41); Los Angeles County, California, U.S.
- Occupation: Science fiction writer
- Writing career
- Genres: Solarpunk, hopepunk
- Notable awards: 2019 Hugo Award for Best Series; 2022 Hugo Award for Best Novella
- Website: www.otherscribbles.com

Becky Chambers (born May 3, 1985) is an American science fiction writer. She is the author of the Hugo Award-winning Wayfarers series as well as novellas including To Be Taught, If Fortunate (2019) and the Monk & Robot series, which begins with the Hugo Award-winning A Psalm for the Wild-Built (2021). She is known for her innovative worldbuilding and character-driven stories, and is a pioneer of the hopepunk genre.

== Early life, family and education ==
Chambers was born in 1985 in Southern California and grew up in Torrance. Chambers' family included several people with an interest in various NASA space exploration efforts. Her parents are an astrobiology educator and a satellite engineer. She became fascinated with space and its exploration at an early age. During her youth, after she first encountered a person who believed that such programs were unwise and that their funding would be better applied to solving Earth's problems, she began studying in detail humans' efforts to explore the cosmos, concluding that these efforts were commendable, although the present methods of funding could be improved. This deep analysis provided much inspiration for her writing.

She moved to San Francisco to study theater arts at the University of San Francisco.

== Career ==
Chambers worked in theater management and as a freelance writer before self-publishing her first novel, The Long Way to a Small, Angry Planet, in 2014, after successfully raising funds on Kickstarter. The novel received critical acclaim and a Kitschies nomination, becoming the first self-published novel to do so. This prompted Hodder & Stoughton and Harper Voyager to pick up and republish the novel. The novel was the first book in the Wayfarers series, which includes three sequels: A Closed and Common Orbit, in 2016; Record of a Spaceborn Few, in 2018; and The Galaxy, and the Ground Within, in 2021. The series won the 2019 Hugo Award for Best Series. She has announced that the Wayfarers series has concluded.

She published a novella, To Be Taught, If Fortunate, in August 2019, with a story that was not connected to the Wayfarers books.

In July 2018, it was announced that she signed a two-book deal with Tor Books. The first book, A Psalm for the Wild-Built, was published in May 2021. The story introduced Dex, a travelling tea monk, and Mosscap, a sentient robot. The second book, A Prayer for the Crown-Shy, was published in July 2022 and continued the story of Dex and Mosscap.

== Style and themes ==
Her Wayfarers series novels take place in a fictional universe, governed by the Galactic Commons to which humans are relative newcomers. She has been lauded for the strong world-building in the series, including multiple unique alien races. Reviewers have cited her complex and likeable characters who drive the story. Her work has been alternately criticized and praised for the deliberate, character-driven pacing and lack of the propulsive plots typical of other space opera novels.

== Personal life ==
Chambers lived in Iceland and Scotland before returning to California, where she currently resides with her wife, Berglaug Asmundardottir, in Humboldt County.

== Awards ==
Year	Work	Award	Category	Result	Ref
2014	The Long Way to a Small, Angry Planet	Kitschies	Golden Tentacle (Best Debut Novel)	Nominated	
2015	The Long Way to a Small, Angry Planet	Otherwise Award	—	Longlisted	
2016	The Long Way to a Small, Angry Planet	British Fantasy Award	Best Newcomer (Sydney J. Bounds Award)	Nominated	
2016	The Long Way to a Small, Angry Planet	Women's Prize for Fiction	—	Longlisted	
2016	The Long Way to a Small, Angry Planet	Arthur C. Clarke Award	—	Nominated	
2017	The Long Way to a Small, Angry Planet	Grand prix de l'Imaginaire	Foreign Novel	Nominated	
2016	A Closed and Common Orbit	BSFA Award	Novel	Nominated	
2017	A Closed and Common Orbit	Arthur C. Clarke Award	—	Nominated	
2017	A Closed and Common Orbit	Hugo Award	Novel	Nominated	
2017	Wayfarers series	Prix Julia Verlanger	—	Won	
2018	Record of a Spaceborn Few	Kitschies	Red Tentacle (Best Novel)	Nominated	
2019	Record of a Spaceborn Few	Locus Award	Science Fiction Novel	Nominated	
2019	Record of a Spaceborn Few	Hugo Award	Novel	Nominated	
2019	Wayfarers series	Hugo Award	Series	Won	
2019	To Be Taught, If Fortunate	BSFA Award	Shorter Fiction	Nominated	
2020	To Be Taught, If Fortunate	Hugo Award	Novella	Nominated	
2020	To Be Taught, If Fortunate	Locus Award	Novella	Nominated	
2021	A Psalm for the Wild-Built	Nebula Award	Novella	Nominated	
2022	A Psalm for the Wild-Built	Hugo Award	Novella	Won	
2022	A Psalm for the Wild-Built	Locus Award	Novella	Nominated	
2022	The Galaxy, and the Ground Within	Hugo Award	Novel	Nominated	
2022	The Galaxy, and the Ground Within	Locus Award	Science Fiction Novel	Nominated	
2023	A Prayer for the Crown-Shy	Locus Award	Novella	Won	

== Bibliography ==
=== Novels ===
- The Vela, co-written with Yoon Ha Lee, S. L. Huang, and Rivers Solomon (2019)
- As You Wake, Break the Shell (2026)
- As You Grow, Seek the Light (TBA)

==== Wayfarers series ====
- The Long Way to a Small, Angry Planet (2014)
- A Closed and Common Orbit (2016)
- Record of a Spaceborn Few (2018)
- The Galaxy, and the Ground Within (2021)
- "A Good Heretic" (short story, Infinite Stars: Dark Frontiers, 2019)

=== Novellas ===
- To Be Taught, If Fortunate (2019)

==== Monk & Robot series ====
- A Psalm for the Wild-Built (2021)
- A Prayer for the Crown-Shy (2022)

=== Short stories ===
- "Chrysalis", Jurassic London's Stocking Stuffer, 2014; republished in Women Invent the Future, 2018
- "The Deckhand, The Nova Blade, and the Thrice-Sung Texts", Cosmic Powers: The Saga Anthology of Far-Away Galaxies, 2017
- "Last Contact", 2001: An Odyssey in Words, 2018
- "The Tomb Ship", Lost Worlds & Mythological Kingdoms, 2022
