= Solarpunk =

Literary, political and artistic movement

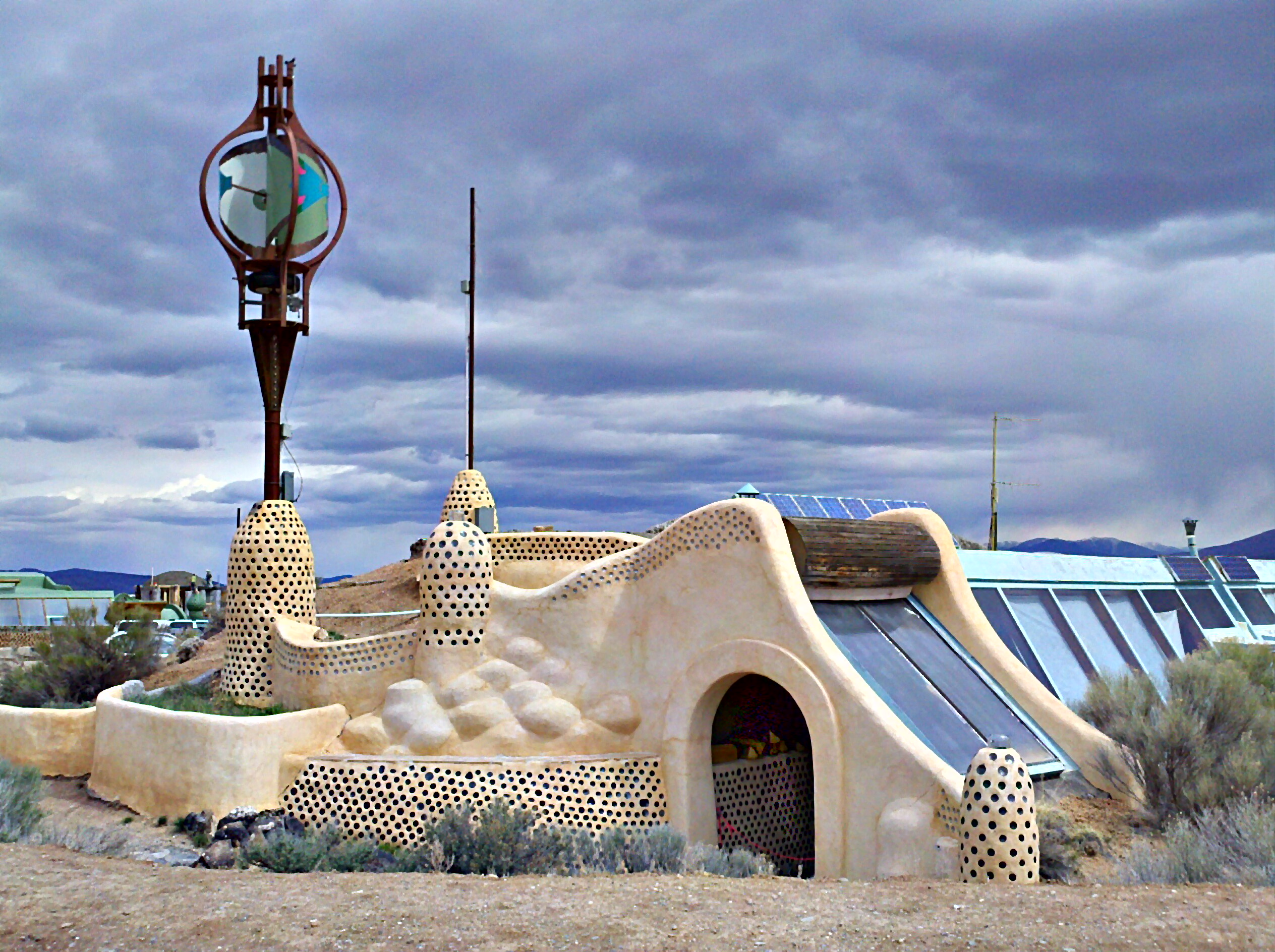
Solarpunk may take practical inspiration from Earthships, which are an example of sustainable architecture.

Solarpunk is a genre of speculative art and fiction which centers on depictions of ecologically sustainable futures. It has been described as the inverse of cyberpunk. The "solar" represents solar energy as a renewable energy source and an optimistic vision of the future that rejects environmental pessimism, while the "punk" refers to do it yourself and the countercultural, post-capitalist, anarchic and decolonial aspects of creating such a future.

Solarpunk works to address how the future might look if humanity succeeded in solving major contemporary challenges with an emphasis on sustainability, human impact on the environment, and addressing climate change and pollution. It borrows elements from utopian and fantasy genres, and retrofuturism. The term originated in 2008, with the term and associated works gaining popularity online over the following years.

== Characteristics ==
Solarpunk is a sub-genre of speculative fiction which imagines positive futures driven by clean energy without scarcity. The solarpunk aesthetic typically utilizes natural colors, bright greens and blues, and allusions to diverse cultural origins. Examples of this aesthetic include the depiction of Wakanda in Marvel Studios' Black Panther, Auroa in Tom Clancy's Ghost Recon Breakpoint, and some Studio Ghibli movies, particularly Castle in the Sky and Nausicaä of the Valley of the Wind. In contrast to cyberpunk, which is portrayed as having a dark, grim aesthetic surrounded by an artificial and domineering built environment reflective of alienation and subjugation, solarpunk is bright, with light often used as a motif and in imagery to convey feelings of cleanliness, abundance, and equability.

== Origin and spread ==
The term solarpunk was coined in 2008 in a blog post titled "From Steampunk to Solarpunk", The anonymous author, taking the design of the MS Beluga Skysails (the world's first ship partially powered by a computer-controlled kite rig) as inspiration, conceptualizes a new speculative fiction subgenre with steampunk's focal point on specific technologies but guided by practicality and modern economics.

Fictional genres with a "-punk" suffix started with cyberpunk in the 1980s describing fiction incorporating computers and the internet, followed by steampunk which was set in the Victorian era and named after steam power in contrast to cyberpunk.

In a similar vein, in 2009, literary publicist Matt Staggs posted a "GreenPunk Manifesto" on his blog describing his vision of a technophilic genre focused on knowable, do it yourself technologies and with emphasis on positive ecological and social change.

Solarpunk was popularized in the 2010s as a reaction to the prevalence of bleak post-apocalyptic and dystopian media alongside an increased awareness of perceived problems with social injustice economic inequality, and impacts of climate change or environmental problems. As post-apocalyptic and dystopian was ubiquitous in media, solarpunk became an attractive alternative to some. Solarpunk is perceived as optimistic yet realistic in confronting contemporary problems. In 2015, journalist Jeet Heer said solarpunk was "more a call to arms than a substantial body of literature."

After a visual artist posted concept art on Tumblr of a solarpunk aesthetic in 2014, researcher Adam Flynn contributed to the science fiction forum Project Hieroglyph with further definition of the emerging genre. Based on Flynn's notes and contributions on the website solarpunks.net, A Solarpunk Manifesto was published in 2019. It describes solarpunk as "a movement in speculative fiction, art, fashion, and activism that seeks to answer and embody the questions 'what does a sustainable civilization look like, and how can we get there?'". In 2024, solarpunk entered The Encyclopedia of Science Fiction. James Machell points to Songs from the Stars by Norman Spinrad as the subgenre's first text, and goes on to contrast solarpunk with cyberpunk, stating, "It is a rebellion against a rebellion, born out of dystopia fatigue."

== Themes and philosophy ==
=== Renewable energy ===
While solarpunk has no specific political ideation, it does by default embrace the need for a collective movement away from polluting forms of energy. It practices prefigurative politics, creating spaces where the principles of a movement can be explored and demonstrated by enacting them in real life. Solarpunks practice the movement in various ways, including creating and living in communities (such as ecovillages), growing their own food, and a DIY ethic of working with what is available, including the thoughtful application of technology.

=== Refusing pessimism ===
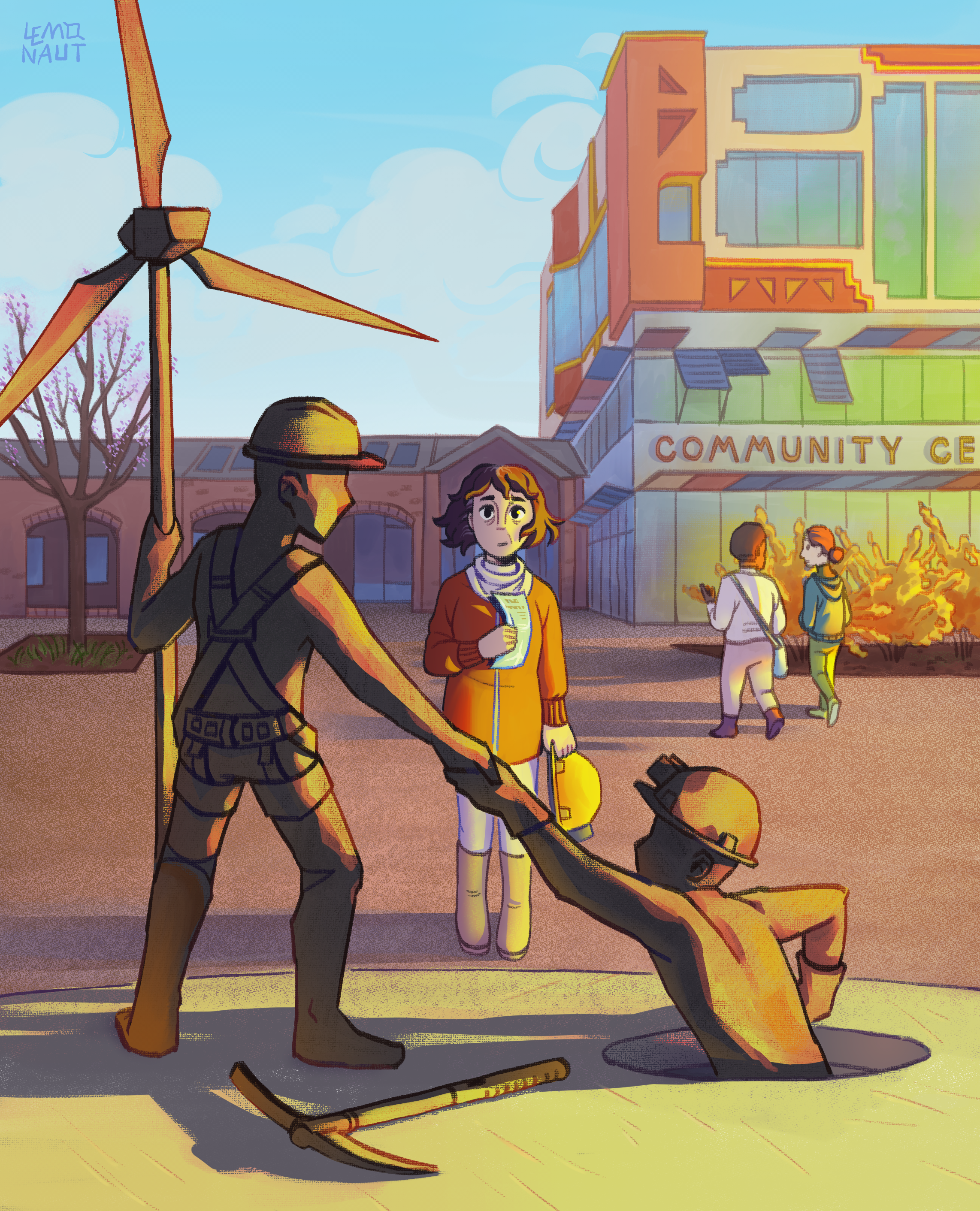
Solarpunk works often include visions of positive social change, like the above illustration of a respecialization center for former miners who lost their profession as the world abandoned fossil fuels.

Stories set in the far future or in fantasy worlds often portray societal failures recognizable to contemporary audiences. These failures may include oppressive imbalances of wealth or power, degradation of natural habitat or processes, and impacts of climate change. Evidence of injustices, like social exclusion and environmental racism, may be present. Disastrous consequences are not necessarily averted but solarpunk tends to present a counter-dystopian perspective. Their worlds are not necessarily utopian but rather solarpunk seeks to present an alternative to a pessimistic, consequential dystopian outcome. To achieve this, themes of do it yourself ethics, convivial conservation, self-sustainability, social inclusiveness and positive psychology are often present. This perspective also more closely embeds the ideals of punk ideologies, such as anti-consumerism, egalitarianism and decentralization, than cyberpunk which typically includes protagonists with punk beliefs but in settings that are used more as a warning of a potential future.

=== Sustainable technology ===
The integration of technologies into society in a manner that improves social, economic and environmental sustainability is central to solarpunk. It is starkly contrasted to cyberpunk which portrays highly advanced technologies that have little influence on, or otherwise exacerbate social, economic, and environmental problems. Whereas cyberpunk envisions humanity becoming more alienated from its natural environment and subsumed by technology, solarpunk envisions settings where technology enables humanity to better co-exist with itself and its environment. Solarpunk stories usually borrow ideas from nature and work it into things like buildings and inventions. They tend to favor technology that is sustainable and fits with the natural world.

Solarpunk is more similar to steampunk than cyberpunk. Both steampunk and solarpunk imagine new worlds but with different primary sources of energy; respectively, the steam engines, and renewable energy. Though, whereas steampunk focuses more on history and uses Victorian era aesthetics, solarpunk uses more Art Nouveau style and looks to the future. Solarpunk also shares some elements with retrofuturism, Afrofuturism, Bionics and Arts and Crafts. The retrofuturist reevaluation of technology, its desire for understandable mechanics, and rejection of mysterious black box technology, and in favor of appropriate technology, are found in solarpunk works. As is the Afrofuturist's counter to mass-cultural homogeneity, the reckoning of injustices, and use of architecture and technology to correct power imbalances and problems in accessibility.

=== Do-it-yourself ethos ===
Although solarpunk is concerned with technology, it also embraces low-tech ways of living sustainably such as gardening, permaculture, regenerative design, tool libraries, maker spaces, open-source, positive psychology, metacognition, and do-it-yourself ethics. Its themes may reflect on environmental philosophy such as bright green environmentalism and social ecology, as well as punk ideologies such as anarchism, socialism, anti-consumerism, anti-authoritarianism, anti-capitalism, civil rights, commoning, and decentralization.

=== Decolonization ===
Solarpunk acts as a future imaginary to subvert climate fatalism. It tends to advocate for the decolonization of energy, challenging eco-capitalism where renewable mega-products, also called green veils, harm indigenous communities. By prioritizing energy democracy and non-hierarchal governance, the movement promotes the reintegrations of human and ecological systems, replacing commodification with community-oriented environmental optimism.

=== Social equity ===
Solarpunk often includes elements of racial and gender equality, drawing this theme from earlier utopian works. Ursula K. Le Guin's 1969 book The Left Hand of Darkness included gender fluidity. Her book The Dispossessed eliminated compulsory monogamy. Becky Chambers' 2021 solarpunk novel A Psalm for the Wild-Built included a main character who is non-binary.

== Fiction ==
=== Literature ===
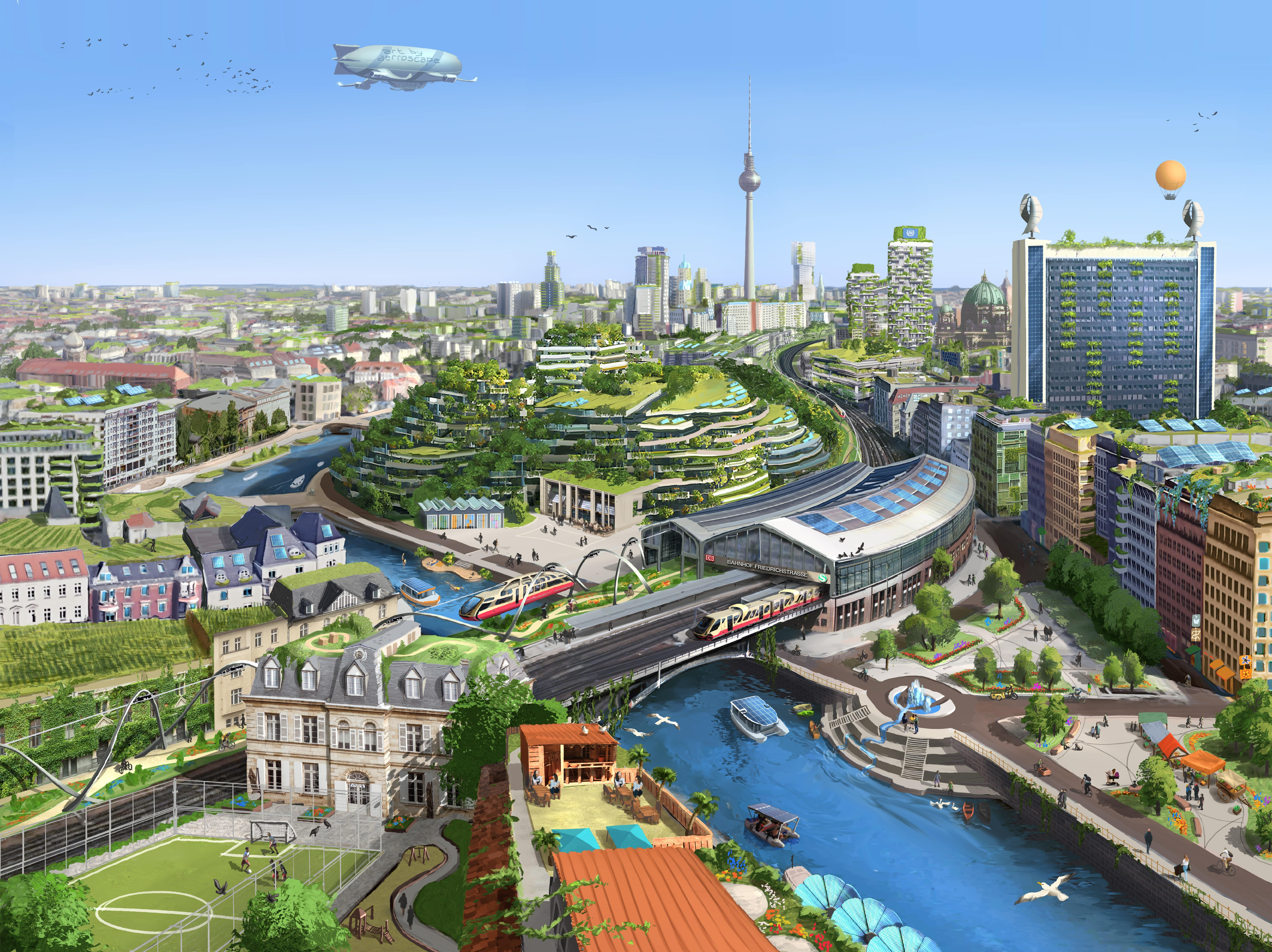
An artist's impression of a futuristic, sustainable Berlin—with rooftop solar power, trees and greenery, airships, walkable streets, and clean water

In literature, solarpunk is a subgenre within science fiction, though it may also include elements of other types of speculative fiction such as fantasy and utopian fiction. It is a cyberpunk derivative, contrasted to cyberpunk for its particular extrapolation of technology's impact on society and progress. Cyberpunk characters are typically those marginalized by rapid technological change or subsumed by technology, while the solarpunk archetype has been described as a "maker-hero" who has witnessed environmental disaster or failures by central authorities to adapt to crises or injustice, often in defense of nature and in ways that allow the story to illustrate optimistic outcomes. Its fictions illustrate feasible worlds that do not ignore the mechanics or ingredients of how it was arrived at.

Previously published novels that fit into this new genre included Ursula K. Le Guin's Always Coming Home (1985) and The Dispossessed (1974), Ernest Callenbach's Ecotopia (1975), Kim Stanley Robinson's Pacific Edge (1990), and Starhawk's The Fifth Sacred Thing (1993), largely for their depictions of contemporary worlds transitioning to more sustainable societies. However, the first explicit entries published into the genre were the short stories in anthologies Solarpunk: Ecological and Fantastical Stories in a Sustainable World (2012) (which was the third part of the publisher's trilogy of short story collections preceded by Vaporpunk and Dieselpunk), Wings of Renewal: A Solarpunk Dragons Anthology (2015), Sunvault: Stories of Solarpunk and Eco-Speculation (2017) and Glass and Gardens (2018). In 2018, author Becky Chambers agreed to write two solarpunk novellas for Tor Books and published A Psalm for the Wild-Built (2021) and A Prayer for the Crown-Shy (2022).

In a 2019 Slate article, author Lee Konstantinou stated that solarpunk authors "proclaim their commitment to "ingenuity, generativity, independence, and community", while going against the "nihilistic tendencies of cyberpunk and the reactionary tendencies of steampunk". He argues that solarpunk is aspirational, as it aims to provide "suggestions for the kind of science fiction or fantasy we ought to be writing". Solarpunk can include elements of mundane science fiction. In a Solarpunk Futures interview with Nina Munteanu about her solarpunk novel A Diary in the Age of Water, Munteanu said she incorporated elements of mundane science fiction to add "the gritty realism of the mundane" to the story.

=== Film ===
In a study of the 44 most popular American science fiction films, nature was found to be ignored in visions of the future, depicted in cities with monoculture lawns and ornamental gardens. Nature is never portrayed in these films in an innovative or integrated way with future human civilization. At best, nature is simply portrayed as a background motif. The study suggested for artists to "collaborate to imagine how to integrate nature and biodiversity into the depictions of future cities".

== Criticism ==
Some, like solarpunk researcher Adam Flynn, worry that solarpunk can risk being greenwashed through aesthetics that give the appearance of sustainability without addressing the root causes of actual environmental issues. Flynn characterizes depictions such as luxury condominiums with green roofs that price out existing communities and may ultimately cause greater environmental harm as examples of "fake solarpunk urbanism".

== See also ==
- Back-to-the-land movement – Agrarian movement of former urbanites
- Climate fiction – Fiction in a setting defined in part by climate crisis
- Degrowth – Philosophy calling for reduced consumption and production to achieve sustainability
- Ecocriticism – Interdisciplinary study of literature and environment
- Ecofiction – Nature or environment-oriented literature
- Environmental art – Genre of art engaging nature and ecology
- Environmental justice – Social movement
- Green anarchism – Branch of anarchism focused on the environment
- Noor – 2021 novel by Nnedi Okorafor
- Open Source Ecology – Ecology organisation
- Rewilding – Restoring of wilderness environments
- Social ecology – Study of relationships between people and their environment
- Technogaianism – Favor of technology to fight environmental threats
- The Venus Project – American nonprofit organization
