= The Erstwhile =

Dark Fantasy/Historical Fiction Novel by Brian Catling

- First Edition
- Author: B. Catling
- Language: English
- Genre: Fantasy Fiction; Dark Fantasy; Historical Fantasy
- Publisher: Vintage Books
- Publication date: March 7th, 2017
- Publication place: United Kingdom
- Media type: Print
- Pages: 480
- ISBN: 978-1-1019-7272-4
- Preceded by: The Vorrh
- Followed by: The Cloven

The Erstwhile is a dark historical fantasy novel by multi-disciplinary artist B. Catling that was first published in March of 2017. It is the second in a trilogy of novels focusing on 'the Vorrh,' a massive and magical African forest.

== Critical reception ==
The Erstwhile received generally positive critical reception, garnering coverage from a wide variety of publications.

By contrast, the review at Kirkus calls the book "slow and murky" and criticizes its relentless focus on imagery over plot, characterization, or theme.

== Editions ==
- The Erstwhile (1st ed.). Vintage Books. 2017. ISBN 978-1-1019-7272-4.
