= The Enterprise of Death =

Historical fantasy novel by Jesse Bullington

- Author: Jesse Bullington
- Language: English
- Genre: Historical fantasy
- Publisher: Orbit Books
- Publication date: 24 March 2011
- ISBN: 978-0-316-08734-6

The Enterprise of Death is a historical fantasy novel by Jesse Bullington, published in 2011. It recounts the journeys of Awa, a lesbian Moor necromancer, through an irreverently portrayed 16th-century Europe, helped by friends who include historical figures such as the polymath Paracelsus and the artist-mercenary Niklaus Manuel.

== Synopsis ==
The story follows the life of Awa, a lesbian Moor slave girl, who is captured near early 16th-century Granada by a powerful necromancer. After several years of tormented apprenticeship, Awa finally manages to kill the necromancer, only for her to discover this to be a key element of the necromancer's plan to reincarnate himself in her young body after a decade has passed. Leaving Andalusia on a search for the necromancer's grimoire, she is caught on the order of the overzealous inquisitor Kahlert manipulated by a shadow from her past, her undead ex-lover Omorose. Fortunately, she is freed by artist-turned-mercenary Niklaus Manuel Deutsch of Bern, with whom she strikes up an improbable friendship, soon followed by further friends in the form of polymath Paracelsus and the lesbian weaponsmith Monique. Though Awa settles down in Monique's brothel in Paris for a while, making good use of her magical healing talents and falling in love with the plucky prostitute Chloé, her impending doom makes her resume her search for the necromancer's grimoire. Further encounters with Kahlert and Omorose and a sect of vampires in the Schwarzwald as well as Chloé's death bring her close to desperation. Shortly before running out of time, however, she - with help from Manuel, Monique and Paracelsus - manages to turn the spirits of the casualties of the Battle of Bicocca against the necromancer's spirit, banishing him forever and thereby escaping his curse.

== Reception ==
Critics well received the novel. The A.V. Club praised it as "beautifully balancing putridity, profanity, and poignancy", and Publishers Weekly appreciated its "relentless dark humor blended with occasional tragedy". The Wall Street Journal's reviewer characterized the novel as "macabre, gruesome, foul-mouthed and much more complex than the usual vampire-and-zombie routine". In January 2012, it was named a finalist for the 2011 Kitschies Red Tentacle award.
