= Sandra Newman =

American writer (born 1965)

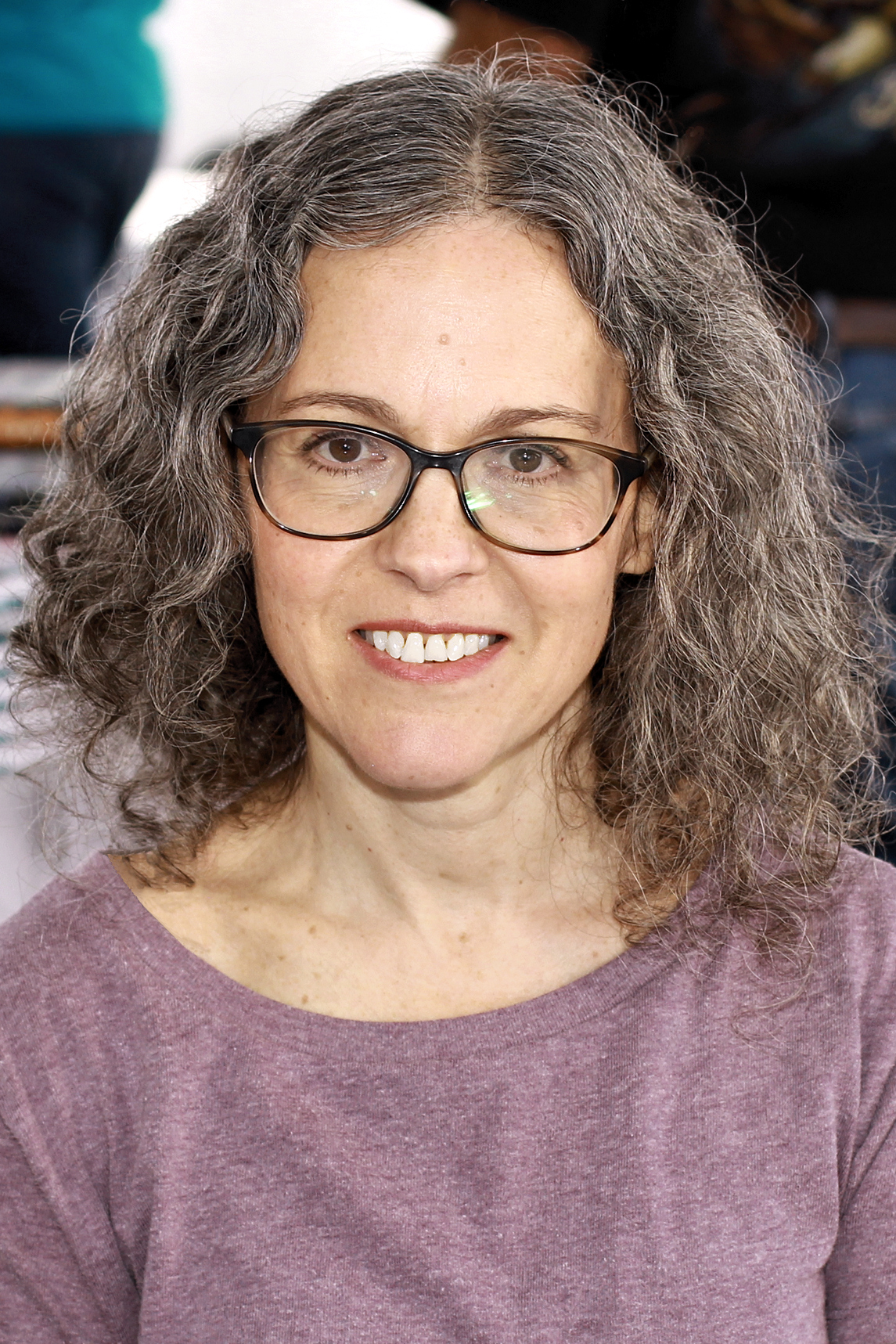
- Newman at the 2019 Texas Book Festival
- Born: November 6, 1965 (age 60); Boston, Massachusetts, U.S.
- Education: Polytechnic of Central London (BA); University of East Anglia (MA)
- Occupation: Writer

Sandra Newman (born November 6, 1965, in Boston, Massachusetts) is an American writer. She has a BA from Polytechnic of Central London, and an MA from the University of East Anglia.

Newman's first novel, The Only Good Thing Anyone Has Ever Done, was first published in 2002 and received a nomination for the 2002 Guardian First Book Award. The novel features an American adoptee from Guatemala named Chrysalis Moffat and focuses on events in her and her family's lives using an unusual style reminiscent of notes taken while composing the novel.

Newman's third novel, The Country of Ice Cream Star (2014), was among eighty titles nominated for 2015 Folio Prize, and among twenty works nominated for the 2015 Baileys Women's Prize for Fiction. The novel follows the protagonist, Ice Cream Fifteen Star, through a dystopian future United States while she searches for a cure for her brother's inherited disease.

Her fourth novel, The Heavens (2019), published by Grove Atlantic, tells the story of a woman who lives in the early twenty-first century, but who returns every night in dreams to Elizabethan era England, where she lives as Emilia Lanier, a Jewish poet whose circle of acquaintances includes an obscure poet named William Shakespeare. The New York Times Book Review called it “a strange and beautiful hybrid.”

She is the author of the novel Cake (2008); a memoir, Changeling (2010); and a guide to Western literature, The Western Lit Survival Kit: How to Read the Classics Without Fear (2012). She is the co-author of How Not To Write A Novel (2008) and Read This Next (2010).

Her fifth novel, The Men (2022), published by Grove Atlantic, recounts a story in which all people with a Y chromosome vanish from the face of the Earth. The book was controversial, with some critical of its focus on biology and exclusion of trans women. However, in The Telegraph, Claire Allfree cites discussion of trans women in the book, and in Publishers Weekly, David Varno says "The Men is at once accessible and surprisingly complex," and notes that "trans characters do feature in it." In a review for The Times, Jessa Crispin described The Men as "the most ill-conceived and badly executed novel of the year". In Financial Times, Erica Wagner wrote that the novel was a "confused and confusing book, a tangled mess of threads that never knit up into a satisfying whole." In The Spectator, Sarah Ditum called The Men "a gripping, haunting novel," and in The Telegraph, Nina Power called it "compelling and enjoyable." The Men was one of five books shortlisted for the 2024 Lattes Grinzane Award for international fiction in Italy.

Her sixth novel, Julia (2023), published by Granta in the UK and Mariner Books in the US, and written at the request of George Orwell's estate, revisits the events of the dystopian classic 1984 through the eyes of Winston Smith's love interest, Julia. The LA Times called the book "a stunning look into what happens when a person of strength faces the worst in humanity, as well as a perfect specimen of derivative art". The Financial Times called it "a richly envisaged, frightening dystopia, wholly alive to Orwell's text", while Erica Wagner dubbed it a "masterpiece" in The Telegraph. Julia was one of ten finalists for the 2024 Grand Prix de littérature américaine in France, and it won the Red Tentacle Award for best science fiction novel of 2024 at the Kitschies.

== Bibliography ==
=== Novels ===
- The Only Good Thing Anyone Has Ever Done (2002)
- Cake (2006)
- The Country of Ice Cream Star (2014)
- The Heavens (2019)
- The Men (2022)
- Julia (2023)
