= The Vorrh =

Dark Fantasy/Historical Fiction Novel by Brian Catling

- First Edition
- Author: B. Catling
- Language: English language
- Genre: Fantasy fiction; Dark fantasy; Historical fantasy
- Publisher: Honest Publishing
- Publication date: November 12th, 2012
- Publication place: United Kingdom
- Media type: Print (Paperback)
- Pages: 485 (First Edition)
- ISBN: 978-0-9571-4271-8
- Followed by: The Erstwhile

The Vorrh is a dark historical fantasy novel by multi-disciplinary artist B. Catling that was first published in November of 2012. Aided in its publicity by a glowing foreword from author and graphic-novelist Alan Moore, it garnered significant critical coverage in the media when republished for an international audience in 2015. The first in a trilogy of novels (rounded out by 2017's The Erstwhile and 2018's The Cloven), it investigates themes as wide-ranging as colonialism, mythology, sentience, and guilt, in prose noted for its lyrical structure and flow.

== Summary ==
The town of Essenwald is an expression of colonialism so pure it was moved brick by brick from Germany to sit nestled on the edge of a vast, time-bending, and quite possibly sentient African forest, known locally as "the Vorrh". With the recent events of World War One casting a pallid glow on the entirety of the colonial project, the secrets of this ancient forest are among the last things Essenwald's managers are concerned with. Though it is mostly ignored in this manner by the colonial intruders, a renegade British soldier penetrates deep into the forest's mysteries when he finds a close relationship crumbling into a strange and tangled series of magical occurrences. Along the way, a sizeable cast of characters both fantastic and historical are drawn into the Vorrh's embrace.

== Critical reception ==
The Vorrh received generally positive critical reception, garnering coverage from a wide variety of publications.

== Editions ==
- The Vorrh (1st ed.). Honest Publishing. 2012. ISBN 978-0-9571-4271-8. Original cover, British release
- The Vorrh (2nd ed.). Vintage Books. 2015. ISBN 978-1-1018-7378-6. Alternate cover, international release
