= The Nexus Trilogy =

Novel trilogy by Ramez Naam

- Nexus (2012), Crux (2013), Apex (2015)
- Author: Ramez Naam
- Country: United States
- Language: English
- Publisher: Angry Robot
- No. of books: Three
- Website: Ramez Naam

The Nexus Trilogy is a postcyberpunk thriller novel trilogy written by American author Ramez Naam and published between 2012-2015. The novel series follows the protagonist Kaden Lane, a scientist who works on an experimental nano-drug, Nexus, which allows the brain to be programmed and networked, connecting human minds together. As he pursues his work, he becomes entangled in government and corporate intrigue. The story takes place in the year 2040.

Nexus tied for Best Novel in the 2014 Prometheus Awards given out by the Libertarian Futurist Society. It was also shortlisted for the 2014 Arthur C. Clarke award. Nexus was published in 2012. Its sequel, Crux, was published in 2013. The third volume of the trilogy, Apex, was published in 2014, and won the 2015 Philip K. Dick Award. The film rights to Nexus were purchased by Paramount in 2013.

== Plot summary ==
=== Nexus ===
Samantha Cataranes (Sam), an agent for the Emerging Risks Directorate (ERD) of the United States government, arrives undercover at a party looking for Kaden Lane. Kaden is there testing Nexus 5, an illegal, experimental nano-drug for direct input and output of brain signals. Sam talks with Kaden about his work and he invites her to be a part of a Nexus 5 study. Sam goes to the study and meets Kaden's close friends and colleagues: Rangan Shankari, Ilya Alexander, and Watson Cole (Wats). Sam takes Nexus 5, connecting her mind with the others, and they discover who she is and Kade uses Nexus to knock her out. When Sam awakes she threatens the group with prison, and promises a pardon in exchange for Kade's help. Wats escapes before the ERD extracts the group. The ERD describe a mission to spy on Su-Yong Shu, a brilliant Chinese neuroscientist who is implicated in murder and brain control coercion. Kade agrees to work with the ERD and hands over Nexus 5. Kade and the group are sent to retrieve the Nexus 5 data, and on the way, they install a backdoor into the Nexus 5 Operating system.

Sam is required to have permanent integration with Nexus 5, despite her disagreement with Warren Becker, the Enforcement Division Deputy Director at the ERD. Kade and Sam, now with the pseudonym of Robyn Rodriguez, travel to Bangkok for a conference that Kade is invited to by Shu. Wats follows in hopes of setting Kade free and spreading Nexus 5 to the general public. At registration, Kade hears an inspiring talk from Somdet Phra Ananda, discussing a Nexus-like topic, and meets Narong, a PhD student. Narong invites Kade to a student mixer the following night. After returning to the hotel Kade finds a secret note left by Wats, informing him of the possibility of escape, if needed. Kade recognizes that he needs to stay and attempts to notify Wats, who never receives the message.

At the opening night reception Sam discovers Narong is a known associate of Suk Prat-Nung, a nephew of Thanom Prat-Nung, a Thai Drug Dealer. Sam decides it is important to continue to track Narong in hopes of catching the Thai drug ring leaders. Kade finds Shu and is invited for lunch the following day, later changed to a dinner as she meets first with Ananda. Kade also discovers that Professor Ananda is under the influence of Nexus. After returning to the hotel, Sam reviews tapes from the day and discovers the interaction between Ananda and Kade and that Ananda also followed Kade home. Sam also discovers that a note has been passed to Kade, however she does not know that it was from Wats. Kade meets with Shu for dinner where she reaches into his mind to discover what he knows. Kade fights back and employs a mantra to rearrange his memories. Shu reverses the effect and discovers that Kade is working with the ERD. Kade discovers that Shu is the first mind uploaded to a computer system. She is trans-human and attempts to convince Kade to join her in fighting humans. Kade asks for time to think about her proposal. She creates false memories so that Sam and the ERD will not discover their true conversation.

Kade and Sam attend the student mixer to meet with Narong. He invites them to an after party in another area. On the way they go to Sukchai, an underground black market for everything trans-human. Kade realizes that legalizing these products would protect people, while Sam struggles with what is right. At the after party, Kade and Sam are invited to a Synchronicity party with Narong to try Nexus and another drug, Empathek. While leaving the party Sam and Kade are attacked. Sam defeats the attackers and calls for backup. The ERD backup arrives and extracts them. Sam confronts Kade about the interaction with Ananda, which Kade denies and arranges his memories to cover it up. The following day, Kade is approached by Shu at the conference. He recounts the previous nights events and Shu denies it was her people. Shu again tries to convince Kade that he should join the trans-humans. Kade takes a call from Ilya that reminds him that technology in the hands of only the elite is dangerous. Kade talks privately with Ananda. Ananda describes Buddhism as a democracy and how technology and knowledge must be shared.

Meanwhile, Wats discovers that Suk Prat-Nung set up the ambush on Kade and Sam. He also discovers a plot to ambush them again during their Synchronicity party and sends an email to Kade to warn him. Sam sees the email and notifies ERD to be available in case of an ambush. At the Synchronicity party, Sam and Kade take Nexus and Empathek. They both use their mantras to change their memories. Sam, believing she is now Robyn Rodriguez, talks with Mai, a young girl that was born with Nexus abilities. Mai unlocks Sam's true memories and contributes to a great change inside Sam. Sam, overwhelmed by her sudden realization of the power of these drugs and released from her horrible past, talks with Kade. She releases his true memories and recounts her dark past. They both fall asleep. Upon waking they find Thanom Prat-Nung and his guards in the room. Narong, under the influence of Nexus 5 and the ERD, draws a gun on Thanom. Narong is killed by Thanom's guards and the ERD sends three team of men into the building, opening fire despite Sam's warnings of civilians. Mai and the other members of the party are killed. Sam kills several ERD agents. Kade fights the ERD soldiers. Wats joins the fight and is killed. The ERD detonate explosions in the skulls of the soldiers. Sam and Kade escape.

Suk Prat-Nung still alive, with a few of his men, continues to fight Sam and Kade. Kade is captured while Sam defeats some of Suk's men. Kade uses Nexus 5 to control the actions of his captor, Suk, to escape. Suk is killed. Feng, Shu's driver and a super soldier clone, rescues Kade and Sam, bringing them to a monastery. Sam and Kade spend some time recovering at the monastery while the ERD searches for them. An ERD recon spider robot discovers Sam and Kade's location, and the ERD sends a team to retrieve them. On their way to the monastery, Shu and Feng discover the ERD helicopters going to the monastery. They alert the monastery. Kade decides to mass distribute the Nexus 5 instructions. The ERD capture Kade, placing him on a helicopter. Sam forces her way onto the helicopter, along with Feng. Shu takes control of the helicopter with her mind and forces it to return to the monastery. Two Thai fighter jets destroy the helicopters just as Kade, Sam, and Feng leap into a nearby lake.

After returning to the monastery, the ERD recon spider robots shoots a neuro toxin at Kade and Shu. Feng cuts Kades right arm off to prevent the spreading of the toxin. Shu is killed. Nexus 5 is spread around the world, despite the efforts of government forces. Warren Becker, the ERD Deputy Director, commits suicide. Kade uses gecko genes to grow back his arm.

=== Crux ===
Six months after the upload of the construction plan of the Nexus, a nano drug, which allows the brain to be programmed and networked, connecting human minds together, the world faces terrorism and massive abuse of the new technology. The Posthuman Liberation Front, a terror cell secretly created and headed by the US-American government, spread terror in the name of posthumanism, to prevent people from using the new technology and bring up an atmosphere of two 'n' eight to take drastic measures against Nexus.

In the meantime, Kade and his new friend, clone warrior Feng, are fleeing from bounty hunters who want to capture Kaden alive to receive a 10 million dollar bounty posted by the ERD. On the elopement Kade is trying to stem the misuse of the nano drug to prevent a war between posthumans and humans. He has a backdoor to any Nexus user that he can use to commandeer bad actors.

The secret services are very interested in the code. Ilya Alexander commits suicide while a prisoner because she doesn't trust herself to not break and give up the codes. Rangan Shankari is also in confinement and does give up his backdoor after torture. However Kaden had changed the actual code in the last moment before Nexus release and the code Rangan knew is no longer effective.

Su-Yong Shu died in Nexus and now lives on as a computer intelligence and prisoner on a server belonging to the Chinese government. Her husband Chen gives her cryptology and scientific challenges to solve, but her mind is degrading into insanity without a biological body to reside in or contact with other minds through Nexus. Her daughter seeks to free her, but is unable, and causes a massive power outage and chaos in the city of Shanghai in frustration.

In Thailand, Samantha Cataranes helps in an orphanage for children born with Nexus capabilities, where she meets and falls in love with a doctor named Jakob. When the orphanage is attacked by locals who fear the Nexus enhanced children, Jakob arranges a move to another orphanage for him and the children, but cannot bring Sam along. During pick up Sam learns that the guards sent to escort her children plan to kill her, violence break out, and Jakob is killed by the guards who escape with the children. Sam then begins tracking the children to a new site in Burma.

Kade and Feng are eventually rescued from bounty hunters, and simultaneously Kaden alone is captured, by a rich philanthropist named Shiva. Whose home is an experimental lab training Nexus connected children to act as super computers. Shiva wants the backdoor to promote environmental and humanitarian causes, allowing him to manipulate governments and populations for a greater good. The orphanages Sam is tracking are at his home, as his corporation was Jakob's employer. Kaden refuses to give him the codes, but is deceived into doing so during an escape attempt.

The story converges on Shiva's home, where the CIA agent Nakamura, Feng, and Sam join forces to rescue Kade and concludes with Sam killing Shiva. The Epilogue covers Su-Yong Shu using Ling's Nexus system to hack her brain and take over the body of her daughter to escape the quantum computer cluster.

=== Apex ===
==== Previous ====
A new nano cyber drug called Nexus is released in the year 2040. It connects human minds and allows the brain to be programmed. The protagonist Kaden Lane works on the illegal drug and is suddenly entangled in government intrigue. The nanomedicine is the breakthrough to posthumanism which governments and corporations fear and try to stop. Su-Yong Shu, a brilliant Chinese neuroscientist, with a mind uploaded to the network, tries to start a posthuman revolution. Soon Kaden Lane, who is summoned to spy on her, becomes her ally. The US American government hunts both and at the end Su-Yong Shu's physical body dies while her mind is isolated in a Chinese data center. Kaden Lane flees with his friends and makes the nano drugs available for all of humanity. As a result global unrest spreads with terrorists using the nano drug for assassination and governments trying to assassinate Nexus users. Meanwhile, Su-Yong Shu is nearly killed by the Chinese government by cutting off power to the data center. In the end she is rescued by her daughter.

==== Apex ====
The United States and China in particular and the Earth in general are aroused by disturbances. Unrest and riots spread with Nexus-upgraded protesters and police. Su-Yong Shu, the former dead neuroscientist who stole her daughter's body by downloading herself into it, tries to take over all electronic systems and with them the entire world, recreating it to fit her imagination. The posthumans are called Apex, the climax, and reinstatement of humankind.

== Film adaptions ==
The film rights to the novel series were purchased by Paramount in 2013.

== Futurism themes ==
The novel is heavily based in, and extends concepts in the author Ramez Naam's 2007 non-fiction work More Than Human: Embracing the promise of biological enhancement, in which the author argues for a technology like the fictional drug Nexus.

=== Genetic enhancements ===
The genetic enhancements to boost strength, speed, and stamina, as described in Nexus, are likely already possible, argued so by Ramez Naam.

=== Operating system backdoor ===
The Nexus backdoor that is created by Kade and Rangan in the novel is based on the Karger and Schell Multics backdoor, implemented experimentally by Ken Thompson, co-inventor of the Unix operating system.

== See also ==
- Neural dust
