= Brian Catling =

British artist and writer (1948–2022)

- Born: Brian David Catling; 23 October 1948; Isle of Sheppey, Kent, England
- Died: 26 September 2022 (aged 73)
- Occupations: Artist, novelist, writer
- Writing career
- Genre: Science fiction
- Notable work: The Vorrh

Brian David Catling RA (23 October 1948 – 26 September 2022) was a British sculptor, poet, novelist, filmmaker and performance artist.

== Early life and career ==
Catling was born in the Isle of Sheppey in Kent, on 23 October 1948. He was educated at North East London Polytechnic and the Royal College of Art.

He held the post of Professor of Fine Art at the Ruskin School of Drawing and Fine Art in Oxford and was a fellow of Linacre College. He exhibited his work internationally since the 1970s. Some of his most notable works and performances included: Quill Two at Matt's Gallery, Dilston Grove in 2011, Antix at Matt's Gallery in 2006, a commissioned memorial to the Site of Execution, Tower of London in 2006, Vanished! A Video Seance made with screenwriter Tony Grisoni in 1999 and Cyclops at South London Gallery 1996.

In 2001 he co-founded the international performance collective WitW.

As a writer he published poetic works, including one compendium, A Court of Miracles, in 2009. His first prose book Bobby Awl was published in 2007. He completed The Vorrh trilogy of novels in 2018.

In 2019 Company Carpi, the partnership of choreographer Bettina Carpi and composer Gary Lloyd, based their hybrid dance piece The Stumbling Block on the poetry cycle by Catling, which includes sections of the cycle recorded with Catling himself at his home in Wytham, Oxford. Catling was the subject of a BBC Arena programme about his life and work, entitled Where Does it All Come From?, which aired in November 2021.

Catling died from small cell neuroendocrine carcinoma, a rare form of cancer, on 26 September 2022, at the age of 73. He was survived by his fourth wife, Caroline Ullman, and his children.

== The Vorrh ==
The first title of The Vorrh trilogy was published in 2012 and features a foreword by writer Alan Moore. Taking inspiration from the imaginary forest of the same name in Raymond Roussel's Impressions of Africa, the Vorrh is the backdrop to an epic fantasy/surrealist narrative led by hunter Tsungali and the Cyclops, Ishmael. Also appearing in The Vorrh are real-life figures Eadweard Muybridge and Raymond Roussel.

- The Vorrh (2012)
- The Erstwhile (2017)
- The Cloven (2018)

== Solo exhibitions ==
- 2011 Quill Two Matt's Gallery at Dilston Grove
- 2010 Bluecoat Gallery Liverpool bienalle
- 2008 Ingleby Gallery, Edinburgh. Scotland
- 2006 Antix. Matt's Gallery. London. 16 night Performance installation
- 2002 Antic (Norwegian version) Video installation. Trans-Art Gallery Trondheim. Norway
- 2002 Buhl Cyclops. Video installation. AKW. Stadt Buhl. Germany
- 2000 Man in the Moon. Galleri e.s. Bergen
- 1999 Were : The Chamber works, ICA, London
- 1998 Were, durational performance, Matt's Gallery, London
- 1997 Cyclops (video installation in German language), Project Gallery, Leipzig
- 1997 Country of the Blind, text, drawings & video, The Economist, London
- 1997 Nordic Cyclops (video installation), Museet for Samtidskunst, Oslo
- 1996 Cyclops (video installation), South London Gallery
- 1995 Cyclops, Galerie Satellite, Paris
- 1994 The Blindings, Serpentine Gallery, London
- 1993 Ten Gallery, Fukuoka, Japan
- 1993 La Bas, Galerie Satellite, Paris
- 1991 At The Lighthouse, Matt's Gallery, London
- 1989 Museum of Modern Art, Oxford
- 1988 Atrium, Neuw Gallery, Sammalung Ludwig, Aachen, Germany
- 1987 White Breath / Red Heart, Hordaland Kunstnercentrum, Bergen, Norway
- 1987 Lair, Matt's Gallery, London
- 1986 On Touching And Haunting A Noble Silent Room, Leifsgade 22, Copenhagen

== Publications ==
=== Poetry ===
- A Court of Miracles (2009)
- Thyhand (2001)
- Large Ghost (2001)
- Late Harping (2001)
- The Blindings (1995)
- The Stumbling Block, Its Index (1990)
- The tulpa index: a stairway half locked at the human gate (1983)

=== Fiction ===
- Bobby Awl (2007)
- The Vorrh (first on The Vorrh trilogy) (2012)
- The Erstwhile (second book on The Vorrh trilogy) (2017)
- The Cloven (third book on The Vorrh trilogy) (2018)
- Only the Lowly (2019)
- Earwig (2019)
- Munky (2020)
- Hollow (2021)
- A Mystery of Remnant (2025)

=== Anthologies ===
- Twentieth- Century British and Irish Poetry(2001)
- Vanishing Points (2004)
- Pittancer (2002)
- Conductors of Chaos (1996)
- The New British Poetry (1988)
- Future Exiles (1992)
