= International Journal of Educational Technology in Higher Education =

- Discipline: Education
- Language: English
- Edited by: Josep M. Duart, Álvaro Galvis, Mairéad Nic Giolla Mhichíl, Airina Volungevičienė

Publication details
- Former names: Universities and Knowledge Society Journal
- History: 2004-present
- Publisher: Springer Science+Business Media
- Frequency: Continuous
- Open access: Yes
- License: Creative Commons Attribution License 4.0
- Impact factor: 7.611 (2021)

Standard abbreviations
- ISO 4: Int. J. Educ. Technol. High. Educ.

Indexing
- ISSN: 2365-9440
- LCCN: 2018240104
- OCLC no.: 1112866676

Links
- Journal homepage; Online archive; Online archive of Universities and Knowledge Society Journal

The International Journal of Educational Technology in Higher Education is a peer-reviewed academic journal that covers all aspects of educational technology in higher education. The journal is diamond open access: authors do not need to pay an article-processing charge. The journal was established in 2004 as the Universities and Knowledge Society Journal, published by the Open University of Catalonia. It obtained its current name in 2016 when it moved to Springer Science+Business Media. The editors-in-chief are Josep M. Duart (Universitat Oberta de Catalunya), Álvaro Galvis (Universidad de los Andes), Mairéad Nic Giolla Mhichíl (Dublin City University), and Airina Volungevičienė (Vytautas Magnus University).

== Abstracting and indexing ==
The journal is abstracted and indexed:

- Current Contents/Social and Behavioral Sciences
- EBSCO databases
- HeinOnline
- Scopus
- Social Sciences Citation Index

According to the Journal Citation Reports, the journal has a 2021 impact factor of 7.611.
