= Ramez Naam =

American novelist

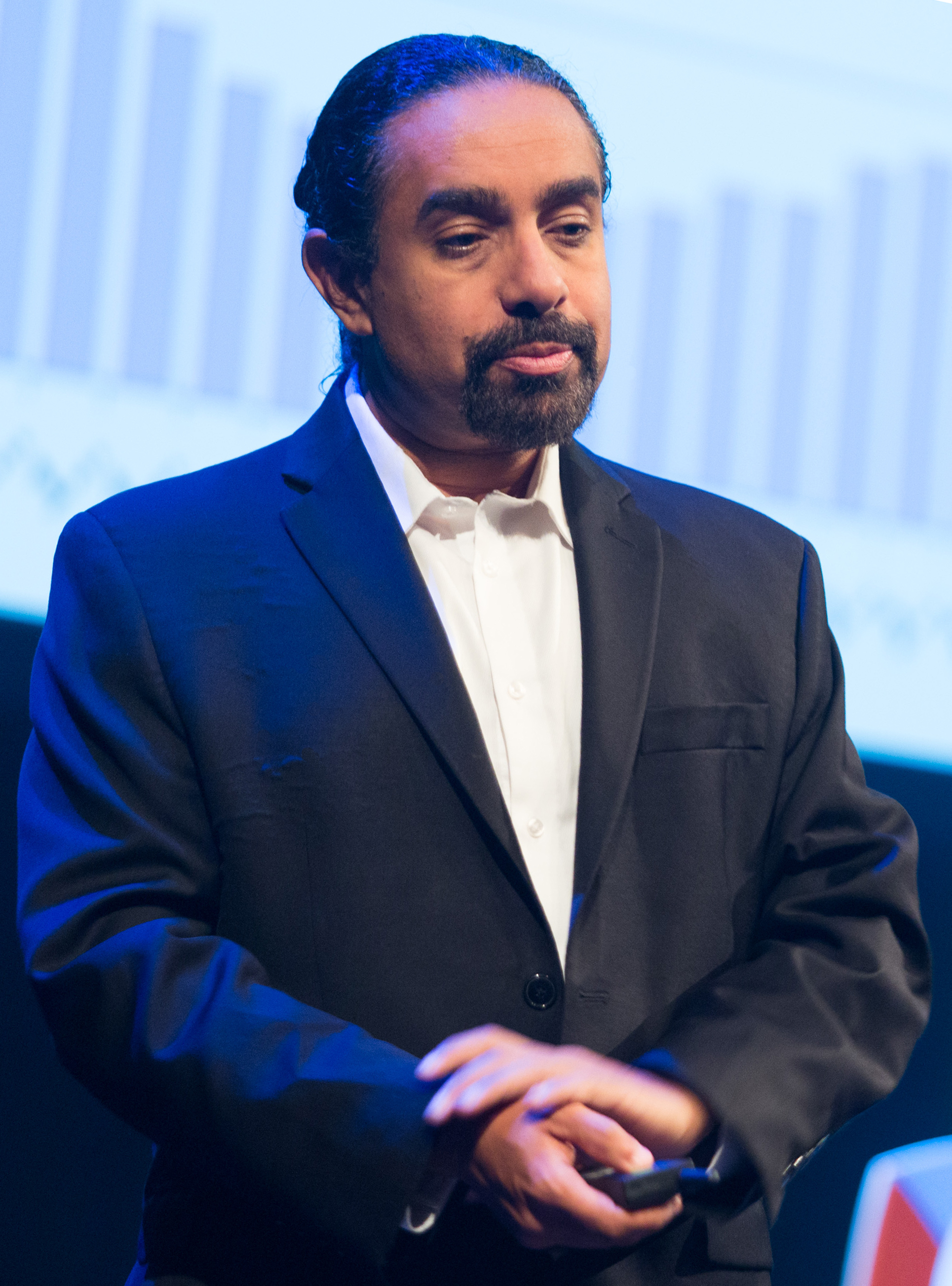
- Naam at the SingularityU The Netherlands Summit 2016
- Born: Cairo, Egypt
- Citizenship: United States
- Occupations: Author; speaker; futurist
- Writing career
- Notable awards: H.G. Wells Award, Prometheus Award, Nomination for the John W. Campbell Award for Best New Writer, Philip K. Dick Award
- Website: rameznaam.com

Ramez Naam is an American technologist and science fiction writer. He is best known as the author of the Nexus Trilogy. His other books include The Infinite Resource: The Power of Ideas on a Finite Planet and More than Human: Embracing the Promises of Biological Enhancement. He is currently co-chair for energy and the environment at Singularity University.

Earlier in his life, Naam was a computer scientist at Microsoft for 13 years and led teams working on Outlook, Internet Explorer, and Bing.

== Early life ==
Naam was born in Cairo, Egypt to a Coptic Christian family, and came to the United States when he was three years old. He has worked as a lifeguard. Naam worked at Microsoft for 13 years and led teams working on Outlook, Internet Explorer, and Bing.

== Career ==
Ramez Naam is an adjunct professor at Singularity University, where he lectures on energy, environment, and innovation. He has appeared on Sunday morning MSNBC, Yahoo! Finance, China Cable Television, BigThink, and Reuters.FM. His work has appeared in, or has been reviewed by, The New York Times, The Wall Street Journal, The Los Angeles Times, The Atlantic, Slate, Business Week, Business Insider, Discover, Popular Science, Wired, and Scientific American.

Naam's book Nexus was one of NPR’s best books of 2013. Nexus and its sequels explore the risks and potential rewards of a technology allowing humans to link their mind directly to one another.

== Awards ==
In 2005 he received the H.G. Wells Award for Contributions to Transhumanism.

In 2014 Nexus won the Prometheus Award, and he was nominated for the John W. Campbell Award for Best New Writer. In 2015 Apex won the Philip K. Dick Award.

== Books ==
=== Non-fiction ===
- More than Human: Embracing the Promise of Biological Enhancement. Broadway Books, 2005
- The Infinite Resource: The Power of Ideas on a Finite Planet. University Press of New England, 2013

=== Fiction ===
==== The Nexus Trilogy ====
1. Nexus (December 2012)
2. Crux (August 2013)
3. Apex (May 2015)
