= Jesse Bullington =

American writer

- Born: February 14th Pennsylvania
- Education: Florida State University (BA)
- Occupation: Novelist
- Writing career
- Language: English
- Genres: Fantasy; Historical Fiction; Dark Comedy; Dark fantasy Gothic Fiction; Horror; Picaresque novel Sword and Sorcery
- Notable works: Sad Tale of the Brothers Grossbart, The Enterprise of Death, The Folly of the World
- Literary movement: New Weird
- Website: jessebullington.com

Jesse Bullington is an American fantasy writer from Boulder, Colorado. He has also published as Alex Marshall.

== Biography ==
Bullington grew up in Pennsylvania, before his family moved to the Netherlands, and then back to the United States. In 2000, Bullington received his high school diploma from SAIL High School, an arts-focused magnet school in Tallahassee, Florida. In 2005, he obtained a dual bachelor's degree in literature and history from Florida State University.

== Works ==
He is the author of several stand-alone historical fantasy novels, Sad Tale of the Brothers Grossbart, The Enterprise of Death, and The Folly of the World, all published by Orbit Books. He has also written an epic fantasy trilogy consisting of the installments A Crown for Cold Silver, A Blade of Black Steel and A War in Crimson Embers under the pen name Alex Marshall.

His novels all use a picaresque, darkly humorous theme, and include numerous references to medieval art or renaissance art and large elements of satire. His novels are heavily informed by his love of the Gothic novel and by his passion for medieval European literature and history.

On his use of gallows humor, Bullington has remarked that "unless you live an extremely sheltered and privileged life, reality is a sea teeming with the grim and the gruesome, and finding humor in otherwise bleak situations can be one of our best lifebuoys."
