= A Prayer for the Crown-Shy =

2022 novella by Becky Chambers

- Author: Becky Chambers
- Language: English
- Series: Monk & Robot #2
- Genre: Science fiction
- Publisher: Tor.com
- Publication date: July 12, 2022
- Publication place: United States
- Pages: 160
- ISBN: 978-1-250-23623-4
- Preceded by: A Psalm for the Wild-Built

A Prayer for the Crown-Shy is a 2022 solarpunk novella written by American author Becky Chambers and published by Tor.com on July 12, 2022. It is the second book in the Monk & Robot series, preceded by A Psalm for the Wild-Built (2021). A Prayer for the Crown-Shy won the 2023 Locus Award for Best Novella and was nominated for the Hugo Award in the same category.

== Background ==
In 2018, for its Tor.com Publishing imprint, Tor Books commissioned Chambers to write a two-book novella series within the emerging solarpunk genre. The first novel in the series, A Psalm for the Wild-Built, was released on July 13, 2021, and won the 2022 Hugo Award for Best Novella.

== Release ==
The novella was released by Tor Books in hardcover, paperback and ebook editions. It was then translated to several languages, including Spanish, Polish, French, Czech, German, Finnish, and Italian.

== Synopsis ==
After meeting in A Psalm for the Wild-Built, Dex the tea monk and Mosscap the robot travel through the human communities of the Earth, now called Panga. Mosscap has been sent by its fellow robots as an ambassador after centuries of no contact. Dex has agreed to accompany it, and the two become friends. Mosscap gets acquainted with human society, and asks all humans the question "What do people need?", a question that was agreed upon by the gathered robots. Along the way, they meet a range of different characters, including Dex's family, who all offer different answers to the question, as it turns out to be difficult to answer.

== Reception ==
A Prayer for the Crown-Shy was the bestseller within the Pacific Northwest Booksellers Association.

The Washington Post stated that it was one of the best science fiction and fantasy novels of 2022. The Big Issue praised the novel, stating that "it takes great skill to write deeply about such seemingly ordinary things and fill them with wide-eyed wonder." Writer Maya Gittelman described the book as "a bit cheekier than Psalm, but no less of a meditative warm hug."

In 2022, was nominated for the Nebula Award for Best Novella. It went on to win the 2023 Locus Award for Best Novella.
