= A Closed and Common Orbit =

2016 science fiction novel by Becky Chambers

- First edition
- Author: Becky Chambers
- Language: English
- Series: Wayfarers series
- Genre: Science fiction
- Publisher: Hodder & Stoughton
- Publication date: 2016
- Publication place: United States
- Pages: 384
- ISBN: 978-1473621442
- Preceded by: The Long Way to a Small, Angry Planet
- Followed by: Record of a Spaceborn Few

A Closed and Common Orbit is a 2016 science fiction novel by Becky Chambers, published by Hodder and Stoughton. It is a sequel to her 2014 novel The Long Way to a Small, Angry Planet.

== Synopsis ==
In the aftermath of the events in The Long Way to a Small, Angry Planet, Lovelace the artificial intelligence illegally loads herself into an android body and leaves the starship Wayfarer to pursue an independent existence in the company of Pepper, a technician. A parallel narrative strand explores the early years of Pepper's life, growing up as a genetically modified child slave.

== Reception ==
A Closed and Common Orbit was a finalist for the 2017 Hugo Award for Best Novel.

At The Guardian, Adam Roberts noted that, although the novel is a sequel, it "works as a standalone story"; he also observed that it shares the first book's strengths (including "complex characters" and "sheer likability") and weaknesses (including "a tendency for characters to pootle about rather than move the larger plot forward"). Publishers Weekly called it "worthy", with a "friendly, soothing atmosphere" and "beautiful pacing and structure".

Strange Horizons lauded Chambers both for her "delightful world-building", and for her skillful presentation thereof. The A.V. Club considered it to be "more intimate than its predecessor", while James Nicoll described it as "more focused (and) more effective".
