= Lee Konstantinou =

American novelist

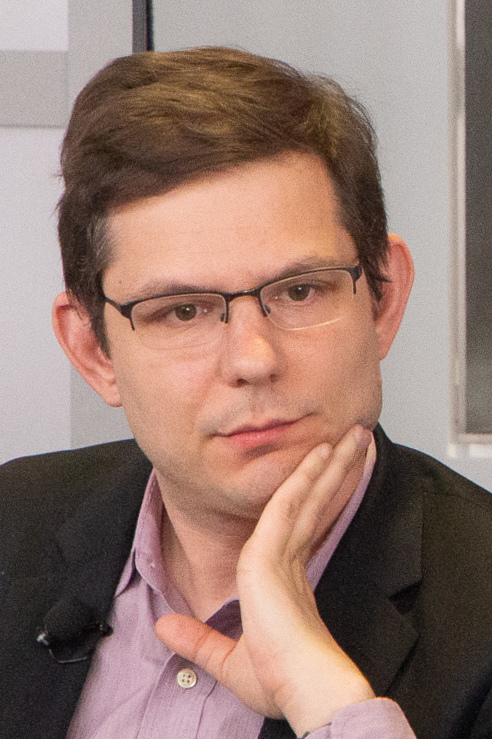
- Konstantinou in 2019
- Born: December 29, 1978 (age 47); New York City, U.S.

Education
- Education: Cornell University; Stanford University (MA, PhD)

Philosophical work
- Institutions: University of Maryland; Princeton University
- Main interests: Postmodernism, Post-irony, Post-postmodernism, Pop culture, Comics, American fiction, David Foster Wallace

Lee Konstantinou (born December 29, 1978) is the department chair and professor of English Literature at University of Maryland, College Park.

== Biography ==
Lee Konstantinou was born in New York City. Konstantinou received his Bachelor of Arts in English, Psychology, and College Scholar from Cornell University. His bachelors thesis was titled "Comics and the Holocaust: A(n) (Auto/bio)graphical Analysis of Art Spiegelman's Maus," about Art Spiegelman's Maus. Konstantinou then went on to receive his MA and PhD from Stanford University in 2009 with a dissertation titled "Wipe That Smirk off Your Face: Postironic Literature and the Politics of Character." Konstantinou joined the faculty of the department of English Literature at University of Maryland, College Park in 2012.

== Fiction ==
Konstantinou wrote Pop Apocalypse: A Possible Satire, which was published in 2009 by Ecco/Harper Perennial. The novel details a future in which "California is an occupied territory, the United Nations is for poor countries, and America's president is named Friendly, but the media-obsessed, personal-computer-equipped denizens[...] are blissfully unconcerned about the brink of armageddon."

In a review for The A.V. Club, Ellen Wernecke awarded the novel a "B," noting, "Pop Apocalypse buzzes with biblical references (the giant neon halo over the Omni Science headquarters is the most obvious) and constant reminders of the end times, but that isn't necessarily bad: The occasionally overwrought imagery is useful for organizing the technology and history of this Department Of Homeland Security-meets-YouTube world[....]The process of building that world is initially a distraction from Eliot's cringe-inducing metamorphosis from rich party kid to concerned citizen, but the details of his known universe are just close enough to terror fantasies and current corporate skullduggery as to be riveting." Publishers Weekly presented another positive look at the novel, writing, "This playful and witty novel takes our celebrity-obsessed and media-hijacked culture, mixes in geopolitics and a dash of cyberpunk dystopia to create an intelligent and blistering what-if." Margaret Wappler of the Los Angeles Times offered a more mixed review of the novel, stating, "His best skill is his imagination. The book is so breathless with concepts that the prose too often serves merely as a delivery device and his characters suffer."

== Non-fiction ==
In 2012, Konstantinou co-edited The Legacy of David Foster Wallace with University of Missouri professor Samuel Cohen. The collection discusses American author David Foster Wallace's legacy following his death in 2008 and includes pieces by other American writers such as Don DeLillo, George Saunders, Dave Eggers and Jonathan Franzen as well as other figures in Wallace's life, such as his editor, Michael Pietsch. The collection also includes a chapter by Konstantinou, titled "No Bull: David Foster Wallace and Postironic Belief," which would later be included in Konstantinou's 2016 book Cool Characters: Irony and American Fiction. In the piece, Konstantinou discusses Wallace's fiction, especially his 1996 novel Infinite Jest, his 1993 essay, "E Pluribus Unum," and Wallace's desire for "a viable postironic ethos for U.S. literature and culture at the End of History"

In his 2016 book, Cool Characters: Irony and American Fiction, Konstantinou expands on the idea of postironic literature. The book first details the "political history of irony" in American fiction, which Konstantinou contends "Wallace misread" as having an "unambiguously critical mission at midcentury," instead offering that "irony offered a vision of political freedom troublingly imbricated with Cold War liberalism." In the introduction, Konstantinou examines the character of irony, first noting the ambivalence of postmodern authors such as Wallace or Zadie Smith about irony and other features of postmodernism. He contends that the most important goal for writers seeking to move beyond postmodernism is transcending irony, though these writers don't have any illusions about returning to a pre-postmodern world. He details four types of political irony: the cognitive, the antifoundational, the historicist, and the characterological. The cognitive form of political irony "sees its political power as arising from its status as a speech act." In Konstantinou's view, the characterological form of irony is the most effective. He contends that the debate over the use and history of irony is characterological, as "[w]hether they are concerned with irony's cognitive, epistemic, or historical dimensions, those who argue about irony use a rich language of character, attitude, sensibility, disposition, and ethos" Konstantinou also discusses the movement of New Sincerity in his introduction, arguing that it is "closest in spirit to postirony," but its "focus on sincerity too narrowly maps the contemporary literary field[....]Why, after all, would sincerity be the aspired state one might want to attain if one was concerned about irony? Why not commitment, or passion, or emotion, or decision?" He also notes, "[m]ore importantly, [Adam] Kelly's focus on the 'ethical' accounts for only a narrow sector of contemporary efforts to move beyond the postmodern," as movements beyond postmodernism should not only address "questions of traditional ethical or moral concern but also a broader universe of mental training, including political life, of which the ethical aspiration to sincerity is indeed one important dimension"

Konstantinou examines figures of American life, the hipster and the punk, and their relation to irony. He contends that "by studying the hipster, the Ur-ironist of postwar life - a character type many artists and intellectuals thought was best adapted to the age of abundance - we can reconstruct the foundations of our contemporary picture of irony and, in doing so, revise many deeply ingrained assumptions about its subversive power" He then traces the concept of "hipness" through American history, beginning in 1938 with Cab Calloway and jive and moving through authors such as Ralph Ellison and Thomas Pynchon. Konstantinou concludes the chapter by contending that "the quest for hip became a branch of a more general postwar quest for criticality as such, which was neither at odds with the liberal 'status quo' nor just another form of positivism[...]Hipness became a characterological weapon in an intellectual conflict that pitted increasingly stale critical institutions against newer forms of knowingness, newer places outside of society that were, simultaneously, inside emerging subcultural groups or coteries that claimed to occupy advantageous epistemic vantage points on American life. We must conclude that the hipster - who signaled his exclusive knowledge through irony - lived in accord with the dominant spirit of the Age of Criticism" In his next chapter, "Punk's Positive Dystopia," he labels the punk in the 1970s as a "frustrated agent within the specific contradictions that marked the boundary between the midcentury welfare state[...]and a still-inchoate (at least at the level of public policy) neoliberalism" Konstantinou notes that the punk sought Do it yourself or DIY culture as a solution to the era in which they existed. He contends that the punk's use of irony, seen in works by authors such as William S. Burroughs and Kathy Acker, is "positive dystopia," an "ironic narrative mode that finds the conditions for survival in destruction" He differentiates the punk from the hipster, noting, "Punk escalates the critical irony of the hipster. Whereas the hipster used irony to draw attention to the polysemy of language, to manipulate language in pursuit of what he saw as human freedom, the punk uses linguistic polysemy in an effort to stop or arrest language itself." Konstantinou then examines punk's connection to irony through its resistance to "selling out" and how this resistance became co-opted, Burroughs' writing, and contemporary punk and its usage of "temporary autonomous zones" or TAZs.

The second half of Cool Characters analyzes postirony, looking at "the believer," the "coolhunter," and members of the Occupy Wall Street movement. In the chapter "How to Be a Believer," Konstantinou discusses David Foster Wallace and Dave Eggers' attempts to construct a feasible postironic movement. He notes that "[f]or Wallace, postironic belief underwrites the possibility of genuine communication" He contends that Wallace's attempts to construct an ethos centered around belief differs from one tied to religion like seen in the series Left Behind, as "Wallace wants to invent a new form of secular belief, a religious vocabulary (God, prayer) that is emptied out of any specific content and is engineered to confront the possibly insuperable condition of postmodernity" Konstantinou argues that like Wallace, Eggers "means to make his readers into believers. Eggers has asked his readers to believe in him, in the truthfulness of his memoir, the sincerity of his various enterprises" Konstantinou concludes that while "Wallace's brand of postirony, for all its power, was more concerned with overthrowing the rule of a particular type of person, the ironist, than with changing the institutional relations that facilitated the rise to this type[....]Because he did not focus on transforming postmodern institutions, Wallace may have been doomed to fail to achieve his aims in strictly literal terms" Eggers "by contrast, seems to have understood the importance of constructing alternative institutions" He lauds Eggers (and the institutions he has created, such as McSweeney's) for "creat[ing] a relatively optimistic ethos of belief that mixes a quirky aesthetic sensibility with an urge toward philanthropy and the active construction of alternative institutional structures" In his next chapter, Konstantinou examines the "coolhunter," a figure that seeks out "cool" cultural items for use by corporations and other capitalist institutions. He discusses the use of this figure in fiction, such as in Jennifer Egan's A Visit from the Goon Squad, where Egan envisions "a near future in which the advanced understanding and manipulation of the cool leads to the rise of a postironic youth culture" He contends that "[a]fter all, Egan seems to show, new forms of authentic experience can still emerge unexpectedly even in a world whose social life is fully enclosed within corporate platforms" Konstantinou concludes the chapter by asserting that "[t]he lesson the coolhunter teachers is that such sensitivity requires, at a minimum, both a critically distant and aesthetically invested sense of the market and the world"

In his conclusion, Konstantinou discusses the Occupy movement. Examining a controversy in the movement in which a group attempting to sell a print of an iconic image related to the movement, he notes, "[t]hough seemingly minor, this controversy showcases the political paradoxes of Occupy, illuminating how difficult it can be to differentiate 'speaking with' from 'speaking for' within the context of Occupy's style of anarchist politics" and contends "[t]he characterological question Occupy raised was nothing less than what form our collective subjectivity should take." He also combats the "[c]ondemnations of the contemporary hipster," writing that the view taken by critics in which the mid-century hipster and other iconoclast figures were entirely authentic and oppositional is "an idealized past[...][s]tories about the dire need to move beyond contemporary hipster irony, toward some new form of oppositional political sincerity, are written in a narrative genre that I will call the postironic Bildungsroman" Konstantinou concludes the book by arguing that irony is "always political," but "does not have a predetermined fate or political content": "As my discussions of the hipster and the punk have tried to show, irony did not, even at its most avowedly countercultural forms, necessarily aid projects of human liberation. Nor, as my discussions of the believer and the coolhunter sought to demonstrate, will we be able to predict in advance the future political significance of postirony." Instead, he offers, "[w]e must, therefore, cultivate within ourselves an ironic understanding of our own countercultural inheritance while simultaneously developing a nonironic commitment to learning how to build enduring institutions that have the capacity not only to rouse spirits but also to dismantle the power of those whose strength partly depends on our cynicism"

In a review of Cool Characters for Times Higher Education, Robert Eaglestone praises the book. He argues, "All of these analyses are complex and detailed, led by a deep engagement with literary texts, their cultural surroundings, and are astutely theoretically informed." Eaglestone labels the book "another insightful, provocative and necessary book in literary studies from Harvard University Press."

In a publication from The Chronicle of Higher Education, Konstantinou responds to Rita Felski's remarks on the dependency of literary scholars on critique: "There's actually quite a diverse range of intellectual frameworks, politically, theoretically, philosophically, yet there's an underlying similarity in terms of this mood of vigilance, wariness, suspicion, distrust, which doesn't really allow us to grapple with these really basic questions about why people actually take up books in the first place, why they matter to people." Felski emphasizes the need to move past critique and the Danish National Research Foundation has awarded her $4.2 million to a study led by Felski "to investigate the social uses of literature." However, Konstantinou has rebuked her claims. In his opinion, "Literary critics are not handcuffed to the project of critique" and as he did his research, put a premium on visiting archives and documenting the past.

Konstantinou has also written for Slate. In a publication there, Konstantinou writes about the phenomenon of the Unmanned aerial vehicle, or more colloquially known as the drone, in combination with Adult Swim's Infomercials short, 'Fartcopter'. Konstantinou explains that this fake informercial aims at selling a product, namely "a small yellow helicopter—a drone—with a speaker hanging from its underside. The drone does one thing and does it well: It makes obnoxious fart noises'. Fartcopter is sold to violent children, to distract them from being violent to other children. The eleven minute infomercial also tells the story of Michael, a boy who loves to terrorize children with his fartcopter. However, one day his family stages an intervention and each one of them uses a fartcopter for the last time. After it farts, the fartcopters report that they are "out of farts." Michael is finally freed of his addiction and murders his family. Konstantinou is of the opinion that Fartcopter can teach us about our relationship with drones. The weapon turned toy "can use weaponized farts to murder America's many enemies, the general explains—at birthday parties, graduations, funerals, yacht launches, dog adoption fairs, quinceañeras, and so on." Fartcopter makes it clear that the whole world is a battlefield. Furthermore, Konstantinou sees the short infomercial as making a critique of the global war on terrorism. Now a remote person can wage war from across the globe. Detached from the experience and reality of warfare, piloting a drone becomes reminiscent to playing a video game. Furthermore, Konstantinou sees something uncanny in the drones, namely that "the human agency behind them is, by design, ambiguous.". The viewer or even victim of the drone does not know if they are being attacked by a human or a robot.

== Bibliography ==
=== Books ===
- Cool Characters: Irony and American Fiction. Harvard University Press, 2016.
- Pop Apocalypse: A Possible Satire. Ecco/Harper Perennial, 2009.
- The Legacy of David Foster Wallace. Co-edited with Samuel Cohen. University of Iowa Press, 2012.
- The Last Samurai Reread. Columbia University Press, 2022.

=== Book chapters ===
- "Neorealism." In American Literature in Transition: 2000-2010, Ed. Rachel Greenwald Smith. Cambridge University Press, forthcoming.
- "Four Faces of Postirony." In Metamodernism: Historicity, Affect, and Depth after Postmodernism. Ed. Robin van den Akker, Alison Gibbons, and Timotheus Vermeulen. Rowman & Littlefield International, forthcoming.
- "Barack Obama's Postironic Bildungsroman." In Barack Obama's Literary Legacy: Readings of Dreams from My Father. Ed. Richard Purcell and Henry Veggian. Palgrave MacMillan, 2016. 119-140.
- "The Camelot Presidency: John F. Kennedy and Postwar Style." In The Cambridge Companion to John F. Kennedy. Ed. Andrew Hoberek. Cambridge University Press. 149-163.
- "Another Novel is Possible: Muckraking in Chris Bachelder's U.S.! and Robert Newman's The Fountain at the Center of the World." In Blast, Corrupt, Dismantle, Erase: Contemporary North American Dystopian Literature. Ed. Brett Josef Grubisic, Gisèle M. Baxter, and Tara Lee. Wilfrid Laurier University Press, 2014. 453-473.
- "Introduction: Zoologists, Elephants, and Editors." With Samuel Cohen. In The Legacy of David Foster Wallace. Ed. Samuel Cohen and Lee Konstantinou. University of Iowa Press, 2012. xi-xxv.
- "No Bull: David Foster Wallace and Postirony." In The Legacy of David Foster Wallace. Ed. Samuel Cohen and Lee Konstantinou. University of Iowa Press, 2012. 83-112.

=== Articles ===
- "'Fartcopter' Has the Answer," Slate, May 26, 2016.
- "We had to get beyond irony: How David Foster Wallace, Dave Eggers, and a new generation of believers changed fiction." Salon, Mar. 27, 2016. Excerpt from Cool Characters: Irony and American Fiction.
- "A Theory of Here." The Account, no. 4 (2015).
- "William Gibson's Breakfast Burrito." Review of William Gibson, The Peripheral (New York: Putnam, 2014). Los Angeles Review of Books, Dec. 12, 2014.
- "Only Science Fiction Can Save Us!" Slate, Sept. 17, 2014.
- "The Eccentric Polish Count Who Influenced Classic SF's Greatest Writers," io9, Sept. 5, 2014.
- "The One Incorruptible Still Point." Review of Thomas Pynchon, Bleeding Edge (New York: Penguin, 2013). The Iowa Review 43.3 (Winter 2013/2014): 170-174.
- "Dave Eggers is Worried About America." Review of Dave Eggers, The Circle (New York: Knopf, 2013). The American Prospect, Oct. 30, 2013.
- "Kingsley Amis's SF Addiction." Review of Kingsley Amis, The Green Man (New York: NYRB Classics, 2013) and The Alteration (New York: NYRB Classics, 2013). Los Angeles Review of Books, Oct. 27, 2013.
- "Outborough Destiny." Review of Jonathan Lethem, Dissident Gardens (New York: Doubleday, 2013). Los Angeles Review of Books, Sept. 8, 2013.
- "Periodizing the Present." Review of Jeffrey Nealon, Post-Postmodernism, or, The Cultural Logic of Just-in-Time Capitalism (Stanford: Stanford University Press, 2012). Contemporary Literature 54.2 (Summer 2013): 411-423.
- "Barbarians at the Wormhole: On Anthony Burgess." Review of Anthony Burgess, A Clockwork Orange (New York: Norton, 2012) and The Wanting Seed (New York: Norton, 2012). Los Angeles Review of Books, Nov. 14, 2012. [Republished as "When Sci-Fi Went Mainstream," Salon, Nov. 15, 2012.]
- "Too Big to Succeed: On William Gaddis's J R." Review of William Gaddis, J R (New York: Dalkey Archive Press, 2012). Los Angeles Review of Books, Oct. 28, 2012.
- "'We'd Hate to Lose You': On the Biography of David Foster Wallace." Review of D.T. Max, Every Love Story is a Ghost Story: A Life of David Foster Wallace (New York: Vintage, 2012). Los Angeles Review of Books, Sept. 9, 2012.
- "Comics in the Expanded Field: Harkham's Most Ambitious Anthology Yet." Review of Kramers Ergot 8 (Brooklyn: PictureBox, 2012). Los Angeles Review of Books, July 13, 2012.
- "Relatable Transitional Objects." Review of Alison Bechdel, Are You My Mother? (New York: Vintage, 2012). The New Inquiry, July 3, 2012.
- "Watching Watchmen: A Ripost to Stuart Moulthrop." electronic book review, Jan. 25, 2012.
- "Anti-Comprehension Pills." Review of Ben Marcus, The Flame Alphabet (New York: Knopf, 2012). Los Angeles Review of Books, Mar. 28, 2012.
- "Never Again, Again." Review of Art Spiegelman, MetaMaus: A Look Inside a Modern Classic, Maus (New York: Pantheon, 2011). Los Angeles Review of Books, Jan. 30, 2012.
- "Hurricane Helen." Review of Helen DeWitt, Lightning Rods (New York: New Directions, 2011). Los Angeles Review of Books, Nov. 21, 2011.
- Review of Sarah Palin in Andrew Altschul, Deus Ex Machina: A Novel (New York: Counterpoint, 2011). The Believer, Sept. 2011: 48-50.
- "Unfinished Form." Review of David Foster Wallace, The Pale King: An Unfinished Novel (New York: Little, Brown, 2011). Los Angeles Review of Books, July 6, 2011. Web.
- "William S. Burroughs' Wild Ride with Scientology." io9, May 11, 2011.
- "WikiLeaks vs. Top Secret America," AOL News, Aug. 5, 2010.
- "Learning to Be Yourself." Review of Abigail Cheever, Real Phonies: Cultures of Authenticity in Post-World War II America (Atlanta: University of Georgia Press, 2009). Twentieth-Century Literature 56.2 (Summer 2010): 277-85.
- "Round or Flat?" Center: A Journal of the Literary Arts 8 (2009): 79-81.

== Sources ==
- Konstantinou, Lee. Cool Characters: Irony and American Fiction. Harvard University Press, 2016.
