= The Long Way to a Small, Angry Planet =

2014 science fiction novel by Becky Chambers

- First edition
- Author: Becky Chambers
- Language: English
- Series: Wayfarers series
- Genre: Science fiction
- Publisher: Self-published (first edition); Hodder & Stoughton
- Publication date: 2014
- Publication place: United States
- Pages: 432
- ISBN: 978-1473619791
- Followed by: A Closed and Common Orbit

The Long Way to a Small, Angry Planet is the 2014 debut science fiction novel by Becky Chambers, set in her fictional universe, the Galactic Commons. Chambers originally self-published the novel via a Kickstarter campaign; it was subsequently re-published by Hodder & Stoughton.

== Synopsis ==
Fleeing her old life, Rosemary Harper joins the multi-species crew of the Wayfarer as a file clerk, and follows them on their various missions throughout the galaxy. The novel concerns itself with character development rather than adventure. Each member of the crew has a story that unfolds, or a crisis to face. They encounter several alien environments on the slow path to their destination. At the end, the ship is damaged by hostile aliens, precipitating changes in the relationships between the characters, setting them on new paths.

== Characters ==
Name	Species	Description
Rosemary Harper	Human	Mars-born, she leaves her home planet to join the crew of the tunneling ship Wayfarer, where she works as the ship's clerk. She has started a new period of her life and tries to conceal her past.
Ashby Santoso	Human	Captain of the Wayfarer who grew up on the Exodus Fleet and is familiar with space-bound life.
Dr Chef	Grum	Both the doctor and chef on board the Wayfarer.
Kizzy Shao	Human	One of the Wayfarer's two technicians. Extremely talkative.
Jenks	Human	One of the Wayfarer's two technicians. Shorter than most people in the Galactic Commons, but chooses not to get this changed.
Sissix	Aandrisk	Pilot of the Wayfarer.
Artis Corbin	Human	The ship's algaeist. He does not often leave the algae labs where he grows the Wayfarer's fuel.
Lovelace or Lovey	AI	The onboard artificial intelligence (AI) of the Wayfarer who runs the processes on the ship and helps during communications.
Ohan	Sianat Pair	The ship's Navigator, they are able to understand the complexities of the sublayer. Without them, the Wayfarer's tunneling would be impossible. They keep to themselves when not directing Sissix's piloting through the sublayer.
Gapei Tem Seri (Pei)	Aeluon	Civilian cargo runner.

== Production ==
In 2012, Becky Chambers started a crowdfunding campaign on Kickstarter, hoping to raise $2,500 so that she could work part-time for two months to finish the book. She stated her intent to find a regular publisher, but noted that self-publication would be a fallback option.

At the end of February 2013, she announced the book's completion, and acquired a literary agent; the book was published by Hodder & Stoughton in 2015.

== Reception ==
The book was shortlisted for the 2016 Arthur C. Clarke Award, and earned Chambers a nomination for the British Fantasy Awards' 2016 "Sydney James Bounds Award for Best Newcomer". It was the first self-published novel to be shortlisted for the Kitschies Golden Tentacle for Best Debut Novel.

The Guardian called it "a quietly profound, humane tour de force that tackles politics and gender issues with refreshing optimism". Io9 considered it to be "exciting, adventurous, and ... cozy", and comparable to "the best space opera universes".

Adam Roberts felt that it was "a huge amount of space-opera-y fun, with some interestingly nuanced perspectives on gender woven into the whole", while James Nicoll observed that although the setting was evocative of the Traveller roleplaying game, he was "more strongly reminded of James Tiptree, Jr.'s short story "And I Awoke and Found Me Here on the Cold Hill's Side" … that is, if James Tiptree, Jr. instead of being relentlessly, inexorably depressing, had been a cheerful optimist." Strange Horizons' Linda Wilson commended Chambers for portraying naturalistic conversation and exposition, and for the relationships between characters. Paul Kincaid, conversely, lambasted it as "too comfortable, too easy, [where] every challenge was overcome with the minimum of bother and no genuine sense of threat."

At the Financial Times, James Lovegrove described it as "SF for the Tumblr generation, a feel-good tale of non-conformity, gender fluidity, multiculturalism and unorthodox sexual relationships", and "perfectly pleasant", but faulted it for "somewhat lacking ... dramatic tension". Similarly, Locus's Adrienne Martini stated that although the novel's opening was "catnip for space opera fans", and although she felt that readers will "love these characters and the exquisitely developed universe they inhabit", ultimately "nothing much happens" until the last 40 pages; Martini emphasized, however, that the novel is worth reading because of its characters and worldbuilding. At Tor.com, Niall Alexander noted that although it is not a "balls-to-the-wall blockbuster", and although it has a "simplistic plot (that) can't compete with either the depth and complexity of Chambers' cast of characters or the sense of wonder suggested by her stellar setting," it is nonetheless a "delight" and a "genuine joy"; ultimately, Alexander concluded, the novel "isn't really about the eponymous angry planet—it's about the long way there."
