= Evening's Empires =

2013 novel by Paul J. McAuley

- Hardcover edition
- Author: Paul J. McAuley
- Language: English
- Series: Quiet War #4
- Genre: Science fiction
- Publisher: Gollancz
- Publication date: July 1, 2013
- Publication place: United Kingdom
- Media type: Print, e-book
- Pages: 384
- ISBN: 978-0575100787
- Preceded by: In the Mouth of the Whale

Evening's Empires is a 2013 science fiction novel by Paul J. McAuley, the fourth in his Quiet War sequence.

== Summary ==
Evening’s Empires is a 2013 science fiction novel by British author Paul McAuley. It is the third standalone novel set in McAuley’s Quiet War universe, following In the Mouth of the Whale (2012). The book continues the series’ exploration of posthuman cultures, political fragmentation, and ecological engineering across a far‑future Solar System. Although part of an extended sequence, the novel is structured to be read independently, combining elements of adventure, political thriller, and space opera. Set centuries after a catastrophic conflict and environmental collapse, Evening’s Empires portrays a Solar System populated by genetically modified clades, religious movements, posthuman polities, and vast engineered habitats, all competing for power and ideological survival.

== Reception ==
Dave Hardy of SF Crowsnest noted "In essence, this is a quest. Not a magical one, of course, but, for most of the book, this is about the search for Dr. Gagarian’s head. It is also a good example of modern space opera."

Greg L. Johnson of SF Site wrote "That's plenty of story for any novel, and Paul McAuley places it in a setting that is both decaying, and, from our perspective, full of wonders. For the characters, life in the Solar System is akin to Europe after the collapse of the Western Roman Empire, with pockets of civilization and relative prosperity separated by lengthy and dangerous travel. It's a far cry from the beginnings of a Solar System wide civilization depicted in The Quiet War and Gardens of the Sun, and from the cultural struggles going on in distant Fomalhaut in In The Mouth of the Whale, yet McAuley provides enough of an historical background to tie them all together. The life of genetic engineer Sri Hong-Owen is one of the connecting threads in the novels and, in a way, influences every character in Evening's Empires, though it is separated from the other novels by vast distances in time and space".
