= Pasquale's Angel =

1994 novel by Paul J. McAule

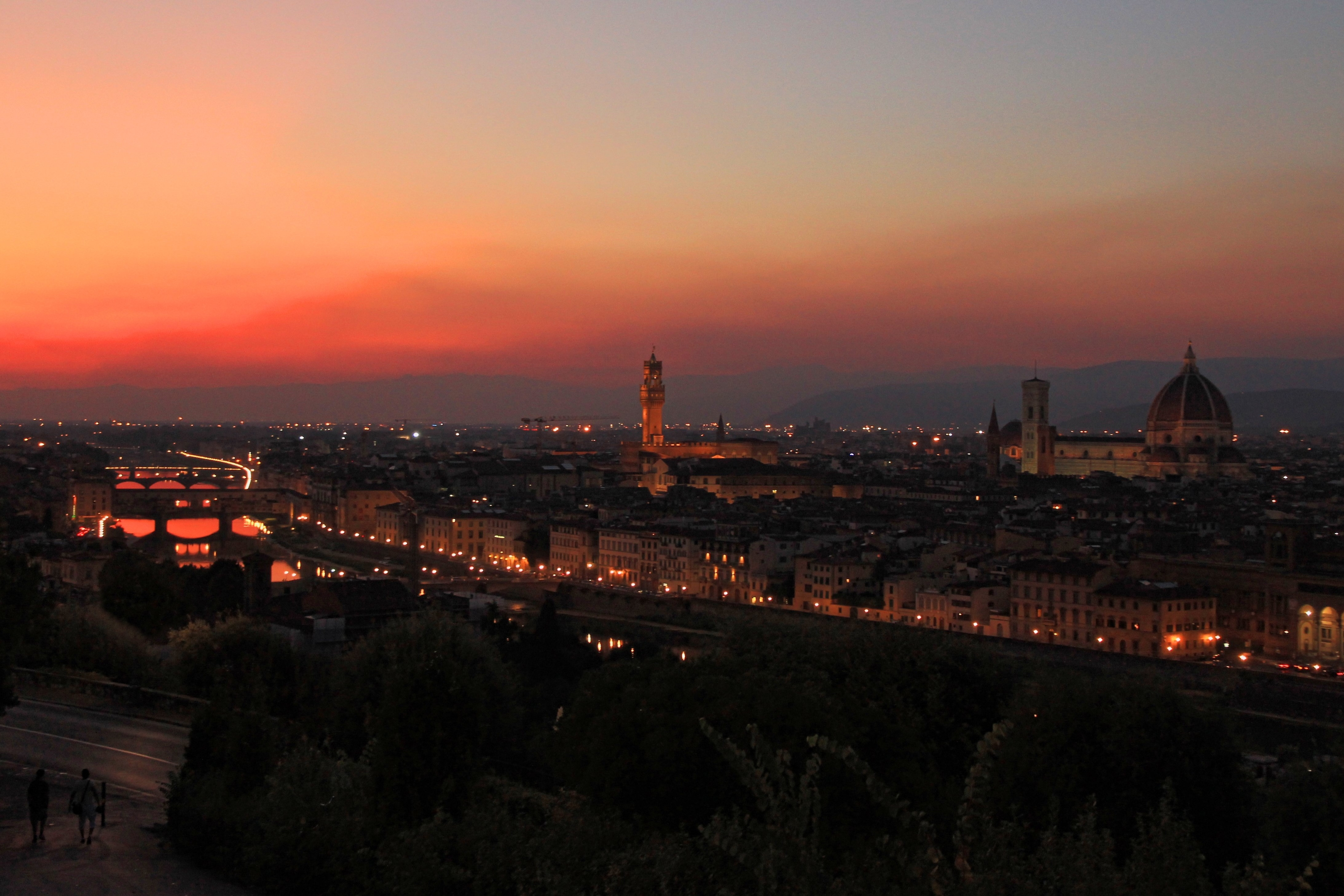
- Night view of Florence.
- Author: Paul J. McAuley
- Language: English
- Genre: Novel; Science fiction Uchronia
- Publisher: Victor Gollancz Ltd
- Publication date: March 31, 1994
- Publication place: United Kingdom
- Pages: 320
- Awards: Sidewise Award for Alternate History (1995)
- ISBN: 0-575-05489-1

Pasquale's Angel is an alternate history novel by Paul J. McAuley, published in 1994. Set in early 16th-century Florence, the novel depicts a world where Leonardo da Vinci has abandoned art for engineering, triggering an industrial revolution during the Italian Renaissance. The story follows Pasquale, a young painter and pupil of Giovanni Battista Rosso, who, after the murders of the artist Raphael and his assistant Giulio Romano, partners with the political journalist Machiavelli to investigate. Their inquiry uncovers a broad conspiracy against the backdrop of tensions with Spain and a Savonarolan uprising.

Pasquale’s Angel combines steampunk-inspired alternate history, detective fiction, fantasy, and coming-of-age elements. The novel includes references to Sherlock Holmes, Edgar Allan Poe, and Frankenstein cinema, while exploring themes of scientific and technological progress and its societal consequences.

The novel received positive critical reception and won the 1995 Sidewise Award for Best Long Form Alternate History. Its companion short story, The Temptation of Dr. Stein, set in the same universe, won the British Fantasy Award for Best Short Story in the same year.

== Description ==
=== Setting ===
Map of the Italian Peninsula at the time of the story.

The point of divergence in this alternate history is Leonardo da Vinci’s career choice. Forty years before the novel’s events, following the assassination of Lorenzo de’ Medici—killed in a plot orchestrated by the Pope—Leonardo abandons painting to focus on engineering. His inventions and rediscoveries, including rocket-launching cannon, tanks, and Greek fire, enabled the Republic of Florence to defeat the armies of Rome and Venice. During the brief reign of Lorenzo’s successor, his brother Giuliano, a purge of dissenters takes place before a revolt removes his dynasty from power. (Note: The Medici were at that time banished from the Florentine Republic.) Leonardo, known as the “Grand Engineer,” established a university where inventions such as Hero’s engine, the printing press, and a steam-powered automobile (vaporetto) were developed or improved, initiating an early industrial revolution and creating a division between craftsmen (the “artificers”) and artists.

In this alternate world, Christopher Columbus, serving the Tuscan Republic rather than Spain, discovers the Friendly Islands of the New World. Amerigo Vespucci establishes peaceful trade relations with Moctezuma’s Aztec Empire. Tobacco, rubber, and marijuana become common consumer goods. Ten years before the novel’s events, the Spanish fleet under Admiral Cortés attacks Florence and its New World colonies. Despite Florence’s victory, aided by the Grand Engineer’s use of Greek fire, the city undergoes political instability following the fall of the government led by Pietro Soderini, (Note: Until then, lifelong gonfaloniere, Soderini had committed suicide during the Spanish attack) before regaining stability. Meanwhile, the Grand Engineer gradually retreats to the tower at the center of his university, reducing his involvement in public life.

=== Summary ===
==== Part one: The Feast of Saint Luke ====
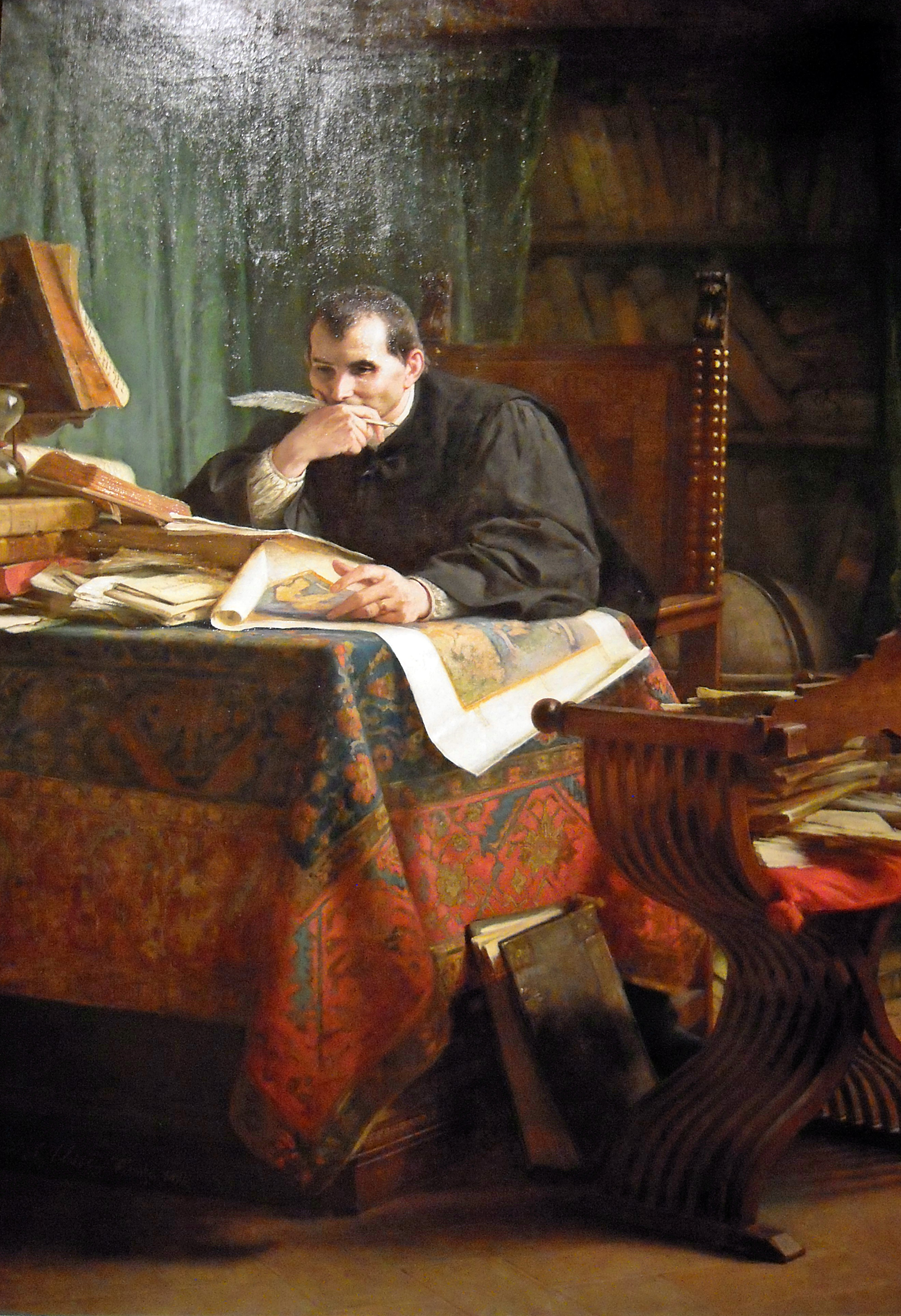
Niccolò Machiavelli, political journalist at the Gazette of Florence.

Set in 1519, the novel follows eighteen-year-old Pasquale de Cione Fiesole, a student of painter Giovanni Battista Rosso. Aspiring to gain recognition by painting an angel, Pasquale currently undertakes small commissions amid the rising status of artisans in Florence. At the annual Saint Luke’s Mass, a key event for the city’s painters, he witnesses a heated exchange between Salai, a member of the Grand Engineer’s circle, and the visiting artist Raphael, who is in Florence ahead of Pope Leo X’s arrival. Pasquale’s account attracts the attention of Niccolò Machiavelli, a former government official turned journalist, who invites him to illustrate an article on the incident. Soon after, a murder occurs at Palazzo Taddei, where Raphael is staying. Machiavelli and Pasquale discover the body of Giulio Romano, one of Raphael’s disciples, in a locked tower room, holding a model of a propeller-driven flying machine.

The signal operator reveals Giulio had bribed him to stay in the tower, though the reason is unknown. The captain of the militia discreetly assigns Machiavelli to investigate. Machiavelli enlists Pasquale’s help in questioning suspects, including Michelangelo and Raphael, who hints at a conspiracy but offers little information. That night, the pair observe someone signaling from the tower and follow him, Giovanni Francesco, another of Raphael’s students, to the villa of Paolo Giustiniani, a Venetian mystic linked to Marsilio Ficino and rumored to practice sorcery. They witness Giustiniani kill Francesco with a poisoned smoke bomb during an argument. Machiavelli and Pasquale intervene too late to save him, but Pasquale retrieves a small glass-framed image Giustiniani tried to destroy. After evading the villa’s guards, they escape.

===== Part two: On Earth as in Heaven =====
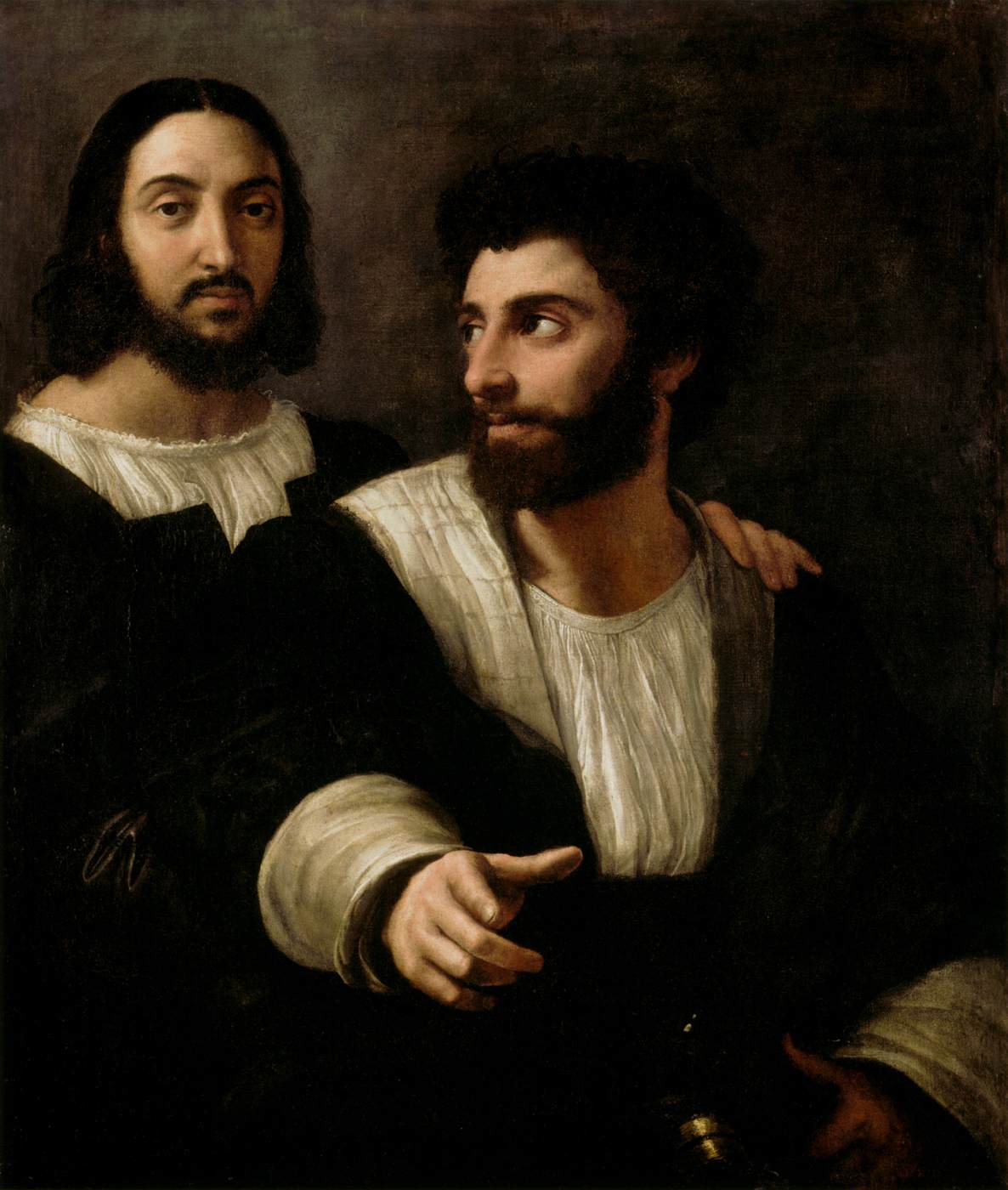
Raphael (left) with a friend, possibly his student Giulio Romano.

As Pope Leo X arrives in Florence to public celebration, Pasquale and Machiavelli reflect on the previous night and examine the recovered image, which depicts Giustiniani participating in a black mass. Machiavelli theorizes that Giovanni Francesco had evidence of Giustiniani’s involvement in occult rituals and was blackmailing him for unknown reasons. They are then visited by Mona Lisa Giocondo, wife of government official Francesco del Giocondo and secret lover of Raphael, who offers Machiavelli a purse of florins to support the investigation. That evening, they use the funds to consult Doctor Pretorius, a physician rumored to practice black magic. He confirms that Raphael has no connection to Giustiniani.

After escaping an ambush by Giustiniani’s men, who had discovered their presence at his villa, Pasquale and Machiavelli head to the Palazzo della Signoria to inform Raphael. At the palace, Raphael is dining with Pope Leo X and his entourage after a presentation by the Grand Engineer, who unveiled an invention that creates images by capturing light. Upon arrival, they learn Raphael has been poisoned via the rim of his wine glass, suggesting Machiavelli was the intended target. The palace is then attacked by Giustiniani’s men using stilts and toxic smoke bombs. In the chaos, Pasquale is separated from Machiavelli but is rescued by servants of Palazzo Taddei and brought to their master, Signor Taddei. Accompanied by his astrologer Girolamo Cardano and Cardinal Jules de Medici, Taddei questions Pasquale and informs him that Raphael’s body has been stolen. The kidnapper demands Pasquale’s release in exchange. To avoid a diplomatic crisis with Rome, Pasquale is chloroformed and taken to the Ponte Vecchio for the exchange.

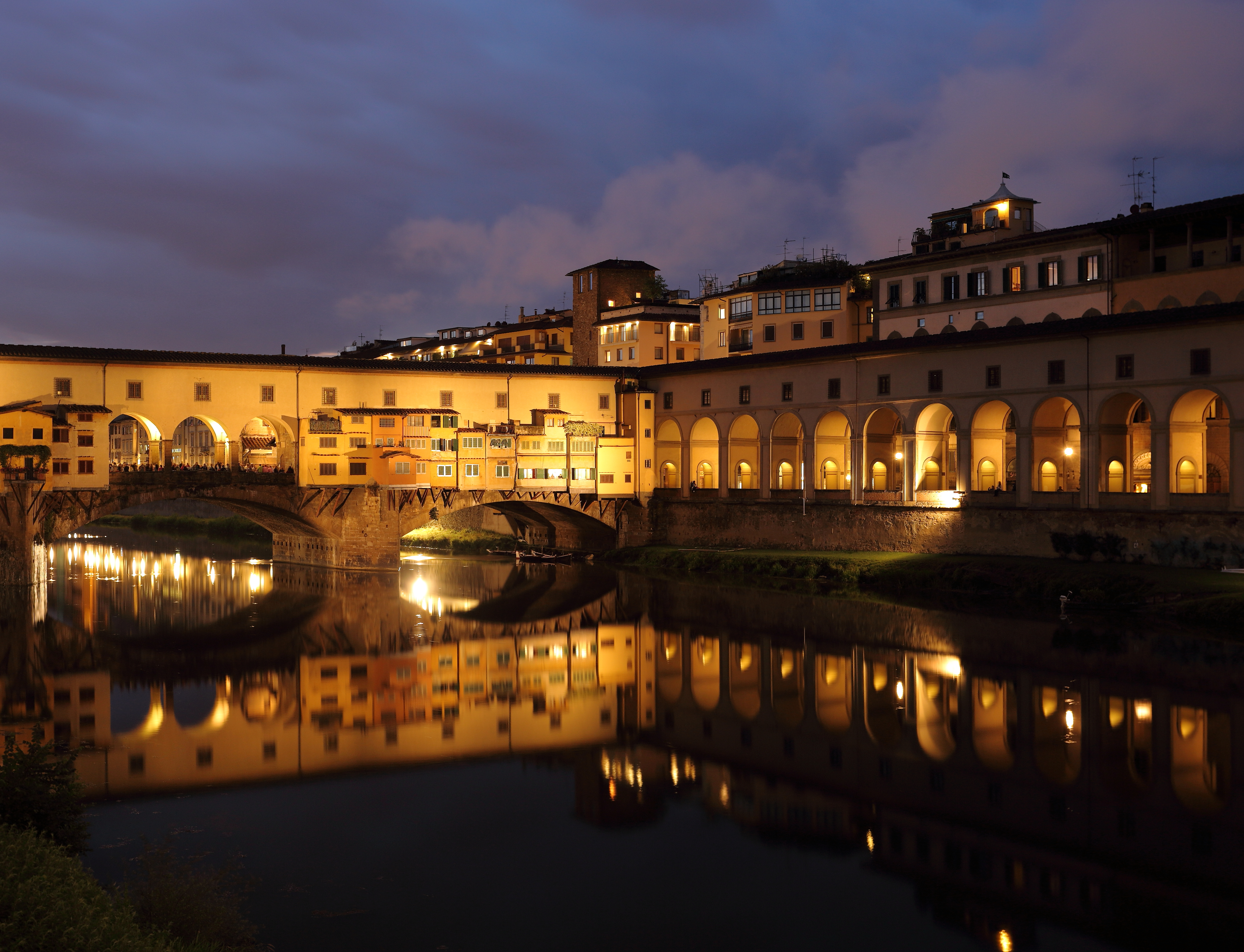
The Ponte Vecchio bridge over the Arno river.

There, the bridge is set ablaze by the ciompi, rebellious workers incited by the Savonarolists. (Note: The disciples of Savonarola, who had taken refuge in Spain after establishing a brief theocracy in Florence several years earlier.) Amid the confusion, Pasquale regains consciousness and escapes with help from his master, Rosso, who appears with his pet monkey, Ferdinand. Rosso leads him to a building where Salai, the Savonarolist monk Fra Perlata, and a captive Machiavelli—about to be tortured—are being held. The conspirators transport their captives across the Arno by barge, but an unexpected attack by Giustiniani’s men causes confusion, allowing Pasquale to escape with Rosso’s help.

==== Part three: The Interrupted Measure ====
After reaching the Arno’s bank, Pasquale, Rosso, and the monkey Ferdinand spend the night outside Florence. Rosso reveals that Giustiniani orchestrated the conspiracy to obtain the Grand Engineer’s latest invention—a flying machine he intended to sell to Spain. Acting on Salai’s instructions, Giulio Romano stole the model during a visit to the Grand Engineer’s tower. Fearing discovery by the secret police, Romano attempted to send the model to Rosso using the semaphore at Palazzo Taddei. Ferdinand was meant to retrieve it but, possibly mistaking Romano for an intruder, accidentally killed him. The model remained in the tower, later discovered by Machiavelli and Pasquale. Giustiniani demanded the model, but Giovanni Francesco attempted to negotiate independently and was killed. The conspirators then distanced themselves from Giustiniani, who continued plotting Raphael’s assassination and allied with Savonarolist factions financially backed by Spain.

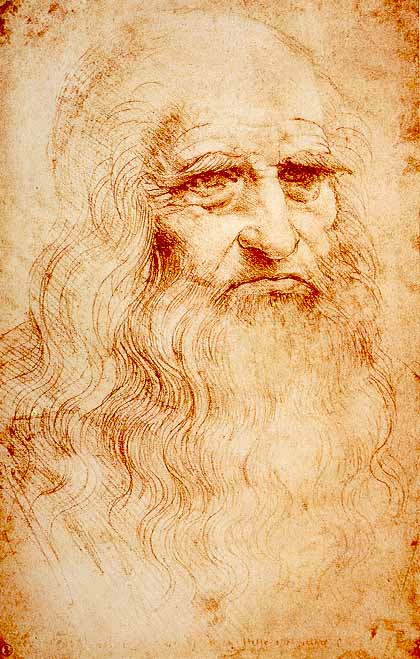
Leonardo da Vinci, the Great Engineer.

The next morning, Pasquale finds that Rosso has died by suicide. Determined to end the violence, he decides to return the model to the Grand Engineer. He retrieves it from Machiavelli’s home before Giustiniani’s agents can. To access the Grand Engineer’s tower, Pasquale hides among cadavers bound for dissection. Discovered and arrested by Salai, he is confined in a room filled with skulls, and the model is confiscated. The Grand Engineer later frees him upon learning of Salai’s betrayal—delivering the model to Giustiniani. With the Grand Engineer’s support, Pasquale and Machiavelli seek assistance from Signor Taddei to launch an assault on Giustiniani’s villa. The plan involves Pasquale infiltrating the villa under the pretense of possessing the Grand Engineer’s secret notes, necessary to operate the flying machine. The aim is to recover both the model and Raphael’s body while distracting Giustiniani long enough for Taddei’s forces—equipped with the Grand Engineer’s inventions—to strike.

Inside the villa, Pasquale finds Giustiniani performing an occult ritual around Raphael’s body, accompanied by Salai, a Spanish emissary sent for the model, and a captured Machiavelli. During negotiations, the villa is attacked prematurely due to a betrayal by Cardano, the astrologer secretly aligned with the Savonarolists. The building is set ablaze, and in the chaos, Pasquale and Machiavelli escape, though the model is destroyed. The Spanish emissary's death provides Spain with a pretext to declare war on Florence. As the republic prepares for conflict and offers Machiavelli a return to political office, Pasquale departs for the New World.

== Characters ==
=== Painters and their circle ===
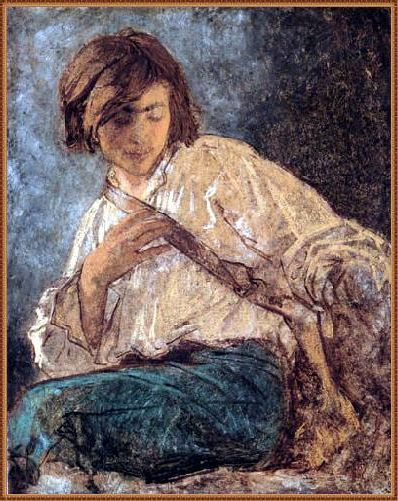
Portrait of the young painter Anselm Feuerbach (1852).

A significant number of characters in the novel are painters. The protagonist, Pasquale de Cione Fiesole, is an 18-year-old painter from Fiesole who aspires to depict the angel expelling Adam and Eve from Eden. His experiences during the investigation with Machiavelli shape his artistic vision. Pasquale is a student of Giovanni Battista Rosso, a 24-year-old painter nostalgic for a time when artists held greater influence in Florence before being overshadowed by pyrotechnicians. Financial hardship drives Rosso to join the Spanish plot to steal the Grand Engineer’s flying machine. Wracked with guilt, he ultimately dies by suicide. Rosso is accompanied by Ferdinand, his tame macaque, named after Ferdinand of Aragon, who dies during the final attack on Giustiniani’s villa when Giustiniani kills him, mistaking him for a demon.

The novel includes several prominent painters of the Cinquecento, notably Raffaello Sanzio da Urbino, widely regarded as the leading painter of his era. He is dispatched to Florence in advance of the pope’s visit to help ease longstanding tensions between the Tuscan Republic and Rome, dating back to a war forty years earlier. During the annual Saint Luke’s Mass, a major event for Florentine painters, Raphael is publicly insulted by Salai. He later visits the Grand Engineer’s tower and is subsequently poisoned during a banquet with the pope. Among his disciples, Giulio Romano, implicated in the conspiracy, is accidentally killed by the monkey Ferdinand while attempting to deliver the flying model to Rosso. Another student, Giovanni Francesco, threatens to expose Paolo Giustiniani’s alleged involvement in occult practices after Romano’s failure but is killed by Giustiniani. A third student, Baverio, assists Pasquale by providing critical information during the investigation.

The novel also features Michelangelo Buonarroti, depicted as Raphael’s rival, who accuses him of appropriating his artistic ideas. Another notable figure of the Florentine Renaissance, the elderly painter Piero di Cosimo, is regarded by Pasquale as his “secret master.” Piero is portrayed as a reclusive figure who, following a journey to the land of the Wixárika in the New World, habitually consumes híkuri, a psychoactive plant, in pursuit of visionary experiences. Piero advises Pasquale to contact Nicolaus Copernicus to gain entry to the Grand Engineer’s tower, based on their prior acquaintance. He lives with Pelashil, his servant and a member of the Wixárika people, who considers him a mara'akame (shaman) and has become his disciple. She also assists Pasquale and Machiavelli during their escape from Giustiniani’s villa in the final stages of the narrative.

Several Florentine painters are referenced in the novel. Pontormo is briefly mentioned through his twelve-year-old student, Bernardo, who is fatally struck by a vaporetto (steam-powered vehicle) at the beginning of the narrative, on the eve of Saint Luke’s Day. Andrea del Sarto, the former teacher of Rosso and a prominent member of the Florentine painters’ brotherhood, also appears. His student, Andrea Squazella, is portrayed as a friend of the protagonist, Pasquale.

=== Journalists and circles of power ===
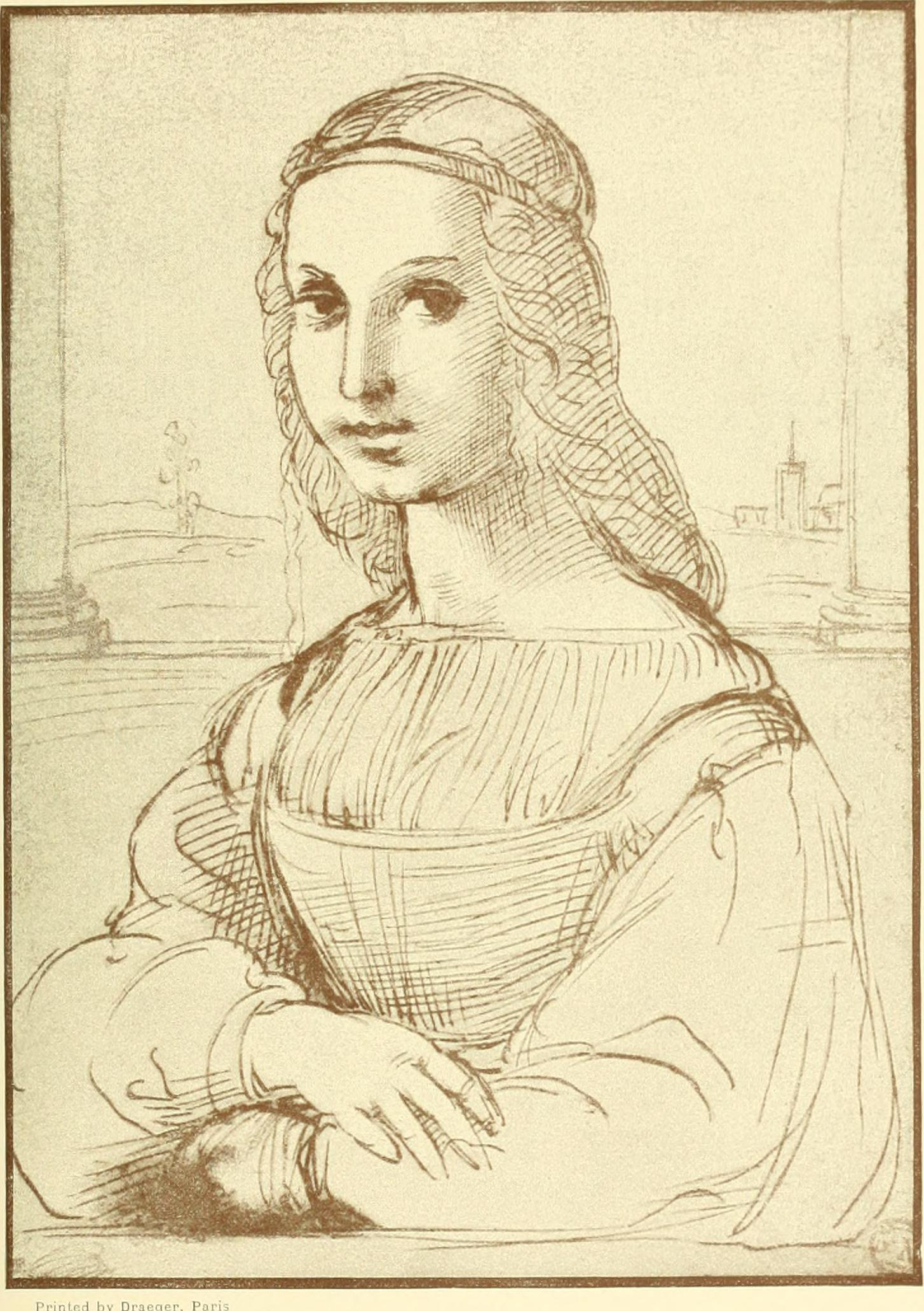
Copy of Leonardo da Vinci's Mona Lisa by Raphael.

Pasquale's Angel explores themes of media and political power in an alternate-history version of Florence. A central character is Niccolò Machiavelli, portrayed as a former Secretary of the Ten (Minister of Defense) under the administration of Pietro Soderini. Following the fall of Soderini's government during the war with Spain, Machiavelli was imprisoned for two years in the dungeons of the Palazzo del Bargello, accused of attempting to restore Medici influence. After his release, he became a political columnist for the Florence Gazette, a tabloid publication based in the former premises of the publisher Vespasiano da Bisticci. (Note: Who went bankrupt due to his refusal to adopt new typographic presses.) Despite a tendency toward excessive drinking, Machiavelli plays a key role in the investigation into the deaths of Romano and Raphael. Other figures associated with the press include Pietro Aretino (Pietro Aretino), the director of the Florence Gazette, and Giambattista Gellia, a former cobbler and revolutionary known for his pamphlets.

Another prominent character is Signor Taddei, a merchant and owner of the Palazzo Taddei, where the character Romano is killed. Taddei is depicted as maintaining strong connections with the Vatican and is advised by Girolamo Cardano (Jerome Cardan), a mathematician and astrologer who is later revealed to be secretly aligned with the Savonarolists. Cardano escapes at the end of the novel, taking Salai with him. The narrative also includes Mona Lisa Giocondo, portrayed as the wife of Francesco Giocondo, Secretary of the Ten of War in the Florentine government, and the secret lover of Raphael.

=== Engineers and magicians ===
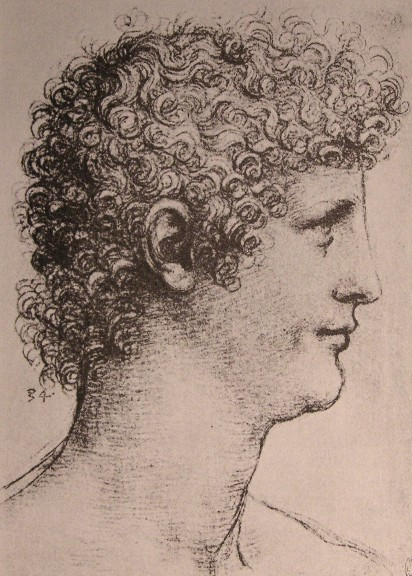
Sketch of Salai by Leonardo da Vinci.

One of the central figures in McAuley’s alternate history is Leonardo da Vinci, referred to as the Grand Engineer. As the narrative's point of divergence, he is portrayed as the inventor who initiated an industrial revolution that enabled Florence to surpass other European powers. In the novel, he is depicted as an aging, contemplative figure who has retired to a self-constructed tower at the center of the city, where he continues his research. His latest invention, a flying machine, becomes the focal point of the conspiracy. Leonardo’s former student and companion, Giacomo Caprotti—known as Salai—is portrayed as gaining increasing control over both Leonardo and his university. Salai plays a key role in the plot to acquire the flying machine, alternating his allegiance between Giustiniani and the Savonarolists. He is eventually captured and taken from Florence by Cardano and the Savonarolists. Jacopo, Leonardo’s guard, appears as a loyal figure who assists Pasquale in gaining the Grand Engineer’s trust, motivated by his opposition to Salai. The narrative also includes Nicolaus Copernicus (Niklas Koppernigk), described as a Prussian scientist credited with the heliocentric model of the solar system. Resentful over the appropriation of his work, (Note: Initially imperfect, as they required a series of artificial adjustments (epicycles) to be applied to the movement of celestial bodies.) he is portrayed as embittered and reclusive, primarily teaching his theories to Prussian students in taverns in exchange for payment or alcohol.

Another character in the novel is Benozzo Berni, an artificer and distant relative of the satirical poet Francesco Berni. He collaborates with Rosso and Pasquale to illuminate the façade of a bank on the Piazza della Signoria during festivities in honor of the pope. The narrative also features Paolo Giustiniani (Paul Giustiniani), a Venetian-born writer and mystic. Formerly a priest, he is depicted as knowledgeable in occult practices and influenced by Marsilio Ficino. Initially leading the conspiracy to sell the Grand Engineer’s flying machine to Spain, he later pursues an independent agenda. Giustiniani dies during the final assault on his villa while attempting to invoke the archangel Uriel through a sacrificial ritual involving Raphael’s body. The poisoning of Raphael is carried out by one of Giustiniani’s associates, known as the “redhead,” who is later killed by Pelashil during the villa assault. The character of Doctor Pretorius also appears in the novel. He is a physician and occultist from whom Machiavelli obtains information. Reputed for conducting experiments on corpses, he is portrayed as a figure with extensive knowledge of events in Florence. In the related short story The Temptation of Dr. Stein, it is revealed that Pretorius once attempted to resurrect a body using electricity and to create a being called the “Virgin of the Seas” from assembled body parts.

=== Men of the church ===
The novel includes several clerical figures. Pope Leo X, son of former Florentine leader Lorenzo de’ Medici, visits Florence in an attempt to reconcile the Tuscan Republic with Rome. However, he departs soon after the assassination of Raphael and the outbreak of a Savonarolist uprising. He is accompanied by his cousin, Cardinal Giulio de’ Medici, who engages in discussions with Signor Taddei, Girolamo Cardano, and Pasquale following Raphael’s death. The narrative also features Fra Perlata, a Savonarolist monk involved in the conspiracy linked to Spain.

== Genesis of the novel ==
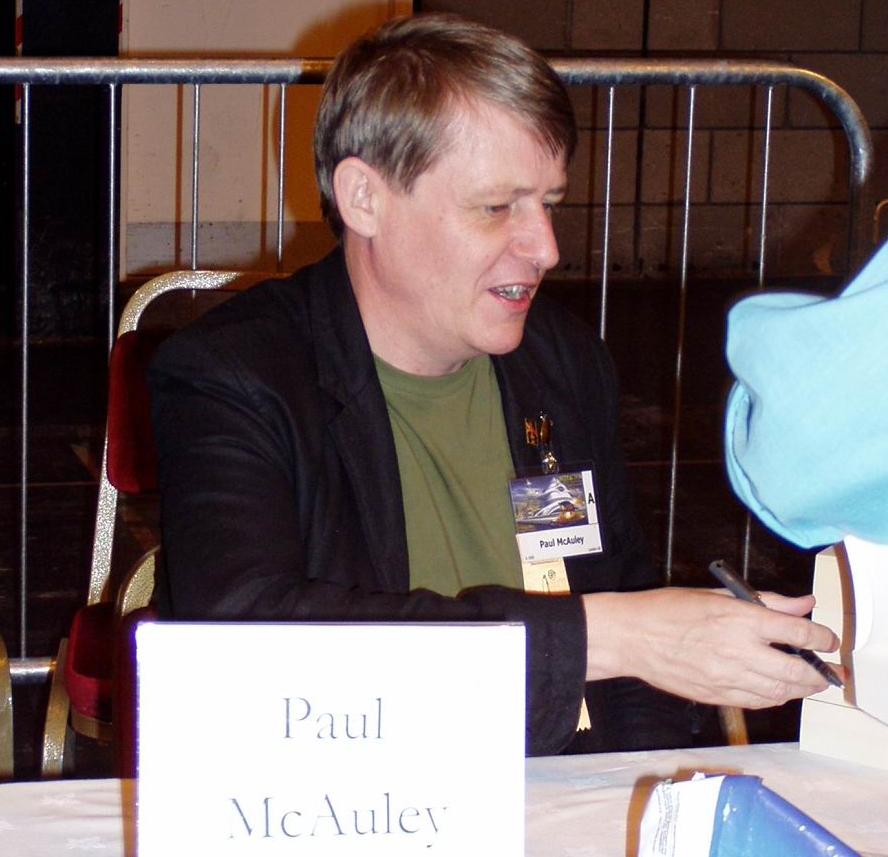
Paul J. McAuley in 2005.

When writing Pasquale's Angel, Paul J. McAuley was an established science fiction author, having received the Philip K. Dick Award in 1989 for Four Hundred Billion Stars. Following the publication of Red Dust in 1993, he began work on Pasquale's Angel, inspired by the idea of transposing Renaissance characters into a Victorian-like setting.

McAuley’s interest in Leonardo da Vinci and his machines forms the point of divergence in the novel’s alternate history. Setting the story several decades after this divergence required extensive research to ensure historical plausibility. He spent six months consulting contemporary sources, benefiting from the emergence of early biographies of da Vinci. This research enabled him to incorporate machines based on authentic designs and inventions, such as 13th-century floating mills from Paris, as well as numerous historical figures. Only the protagonist, Pasquale, born after the divergence, and a few minor characters are fictional.

Among the historical figures featured in the novel, the character of Machiavelli posed a particular challenge for the author. Originally intended to appear briefly as a means for Pasquale to access the crime scene, Machiavelli ultimately became central to the plot, despite McAuley’s efforts to reduce his role, including scenes in which the character is tortured. The detective storyline involving Machiavelli forms a core element of the novel, although McAuley considers Pasquale’s artistic quest—the search for the angel he aims to paint, which also inspired the novel’s original title, Pasquale’s Angel—to be the primary focus.

== Reception ==
=== Critical reception ===
The novel was generally well received upon its 1994 release, and its reputation grew steadily thereafter. In 2005, seven years after the French translation by Olivier Deparis, literary critic Gilbert Millet described it as a “classic of alternate history.” In 1995, Publishers Weekly called it “ambitious and often brilliant,” praising its “masterfully constructed chiaroscuro world” and noting that Machiavelli is portrayed as “Machiavellian even in everyday conversation.” Canadian author Jean-Louis Trudel wrote that McAuley “takes steampunk to an unprecedented level,” highlighting the novel’s attention to detail, from “a Machiavelli playing the Sherlock Holmes of the Renaissance” to “a cameo of a Polish canon named Copernicus.” Although Trudel questioned the plausibility of an industrialized Florence and noted occasional narrative slowdowns, he concluded that the book “will delight lovers of the unexpected juxtapositions offered by steampunk: the roaring engines of modernity transposed into old alleyways, and the lost heroes of our history brushing shoulders with characters born of the author’s imagination.” Kirkus Reviews was more reserved, describing the work as “meticulously constructed, with a fascinating blend of real and imaginary historical characters,” but critiquing its “grim, hermetic nature” and reluctance to engage the reader. New Scientist offered one of the most negative appraisals, lamenting the emphasis on the detective plot and “political complexities” at the expense of setting and mysticism, and faulting an “awkward writing style, littered with verbless sentences […], subordinate clauses attached to the wrong noun […], clichés […] and repetitions.”

In the French-speaking world, the novel received a generally positive reception and contributed to Paul J. McAuley’s recognition among French readers. French author Claude Ecken praised the novel for striking “the right balance in his collage of historical elements and speculative shifts,” describing it as “delightful, clever, full of references” and able to appeal to both general literature readers and fans of quality science fiction. The French fantasy site Elbakin.net rated Pasquale’s Angel 8/10, noting that although the connection between the two parallel plots—the detective mystery and Pasquale’s artistic quest—was somewhat weak, “the plots themselves are captivating” and the detailed style effectively immerses readers in the alternate Florence. Gilbert Millet of Galaxies described the novel as “lively and mischievous,” offering a “festive alternate history, rich in winks and twists,” and considered it “more imaginative than The Da Vinci Code.” Among more critical responses, Laurent Deneuve from ActuSF found the pacing too rapid in the middle section, which he felt diminished reader engagement with the plot. Conversely, Belgian writer Karine Gobled regarded the novel as “accessible and exciting to read,” recommending it as an introduction to alternate history, while Jérôme Vincent of ActuSF included it among the ten essential works of the genre.

=== Awards ===
Pasquale’s Angel received the 1995 Sidewise Award for long-form alternate history. In the same year, it was a finalist for the Arthur C. Clarke Award, placed 29th in the Locus Awards for Best Science Fiction Novel, and was nominated for the August Derleth Award for Best Fantasy Novel, the Hugo Award for Best Novel, and the Grand Prix de l’Imaginaire (foreign novel category).

The related short story Dr. Pretorius’s Temptation, which explores the actions of Doctor Pretorius ten years prior to the events of Pasquale’s Angel, won the British Fantasy Award for Best Short Story in 1995 and was nominated for the 1996 Sidewise Award (short form).

== Analysis ==
=== A work at the crossroads of literary genres ===
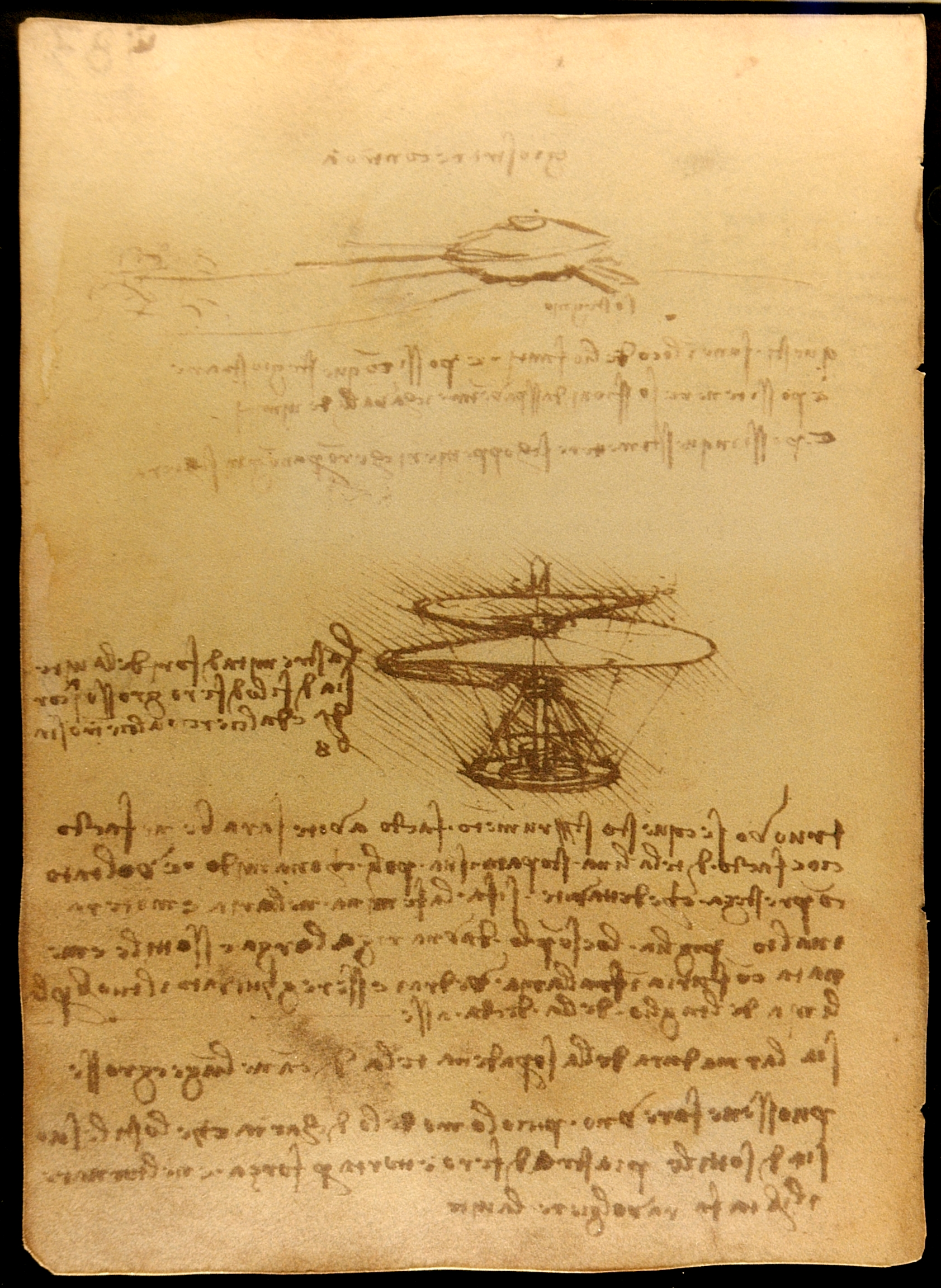
The Great Engineer's flying invention, coveted by all.

The Pasquale's Angel by McAuley is a novel that spans multiple literary genres, primarily classified as alternate history. This subgenre of science fiction, originating in the 19th century with Charles Renouvier, involves the "fictional reconstruction of history, recounting events as they might have happened." Alternate history is defined by a divergence from a specific historical point, creating a new narrative explored by the author. In Pasquale's Angel, the point of divergence is twofold: Lorenzo de’ Medici, rather than his brother Giuliano, is assassinated during the Pazzi conspiracy in 1478; and Leonardo da Vinci chooses to focus on engineering instead of art. These changes set in motion a transformation of the world depicted in the novel, leading to an industrialized Florence that dominates the West and the New World approximately four decades later.

The industrial setting of Pasquale's Angel aligns the novel with steampunk, a subgenre of alternate history that envisions a fictional past where the Industrial Revolution occurred earlier than in reality. Benoît Domis compares the novel to Tim Powers' The Anubis Gates, a foundational work in the genre, while John Clute draws parallels with The Difference Engine by William Gibson and Bruce Sterling. However, since steampunk is typically set in Victorian England rather than Renaissance Italy, classifying McAuley’s novel as steampunk is debated. Writer Ned Beauman considers it more accurately an example of clockpunk, a subgenre that places modern technological developments in the Renaissance period. Kirkus Reviews describes the novel as “oldmasterpunk,” combining steampunk with references to old master painters featured among the characters.

Pasquale's Angel can also be classified as a detective novel, with its plot centered on the investigation of two murders—the killing of Raphael’s assistant and the subsequent poisoning of Raphael himself—pursued by Pasquale and Machiavelli. The narrative is driven by multiple twists in the crime mystery. The novel incorporates elements of the supernatural and fantasy, including events linked to the occultist Giustiniani that often have rational explanations, as well as mysticism associated with the shamanic practices of the Wixárika Amerindians, introduced to Pasquale by his former mentor Piero di Cosimo and the Wixárika woman Pelashil. Additionally, through Pasquale’s artistic development and personal growth, the novel can also be regarded as a Bildungsroman.

=== A tribute to popular culture ===
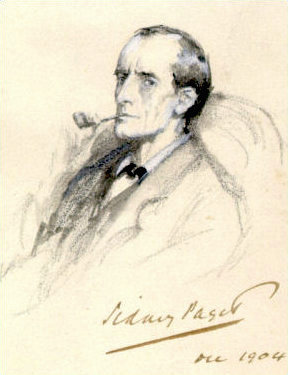
Sherlock Holmes, McAuley's inspiration for the character of Machiavelli.

Writing Pasquale's Angel allowed McAuley to include numerous references to popular literature and cinema, especially within the supernatural-detective genre. A prominent comparison is drawn between Machiavelli and Sherlock Holmes, the detective created by Arthur Conan Doyle. Like Holmes, Machiavelli applies observation and deduction to investigate crimes, functioning as an early form of private detective. Literary critic Robert K. J. Killheffer highlights Machiavelli’s principle to Pasquale—“Once all materially inadmissible hypotheses have been discarded, it is among those that remain, however improbable they may seem, that the true solution must be sought.”—as an inverted reference to Holmes’s famous maxim. The partnership between Machiavelli and Pasquale parallels the Holmes-Watson dynamic, with an experienced investigator mentoring a less experienced assistant in crime-solving techniques.

Parallels can be drawn between Pasquale's Angel and other detective works, particularly those of Edgar Allan Poe. The adventures of Poe’s character Auguste Dupin, a private investigator in Paris during the July Monarchy, are reflected in the novel’s plot, especially in “the nature of the mysteries posed and the manner of solving them,” according to critic Benoît Domis. The murder of Giulio Romano, Raphael’s assistant, resembles the killings in Poe’s The Murders in the Rue Morgue, where victims are found in a locked room under seemingly inexplicable circumstances until the detective reveals the unusual perpetrator. Additionally, the discovery of the crime’s motive—an insignificant model found at the scene and later placed in plain sight—echoes The Purloined Letter, in which a stolen letter is hidden by its ordinary appearance and obvious placement, eluding detection. Machiavelli’s fondness for alcohol also alludes to Poe’s reputed alcoholism; McAuley has described both men as “drunken journalists.”

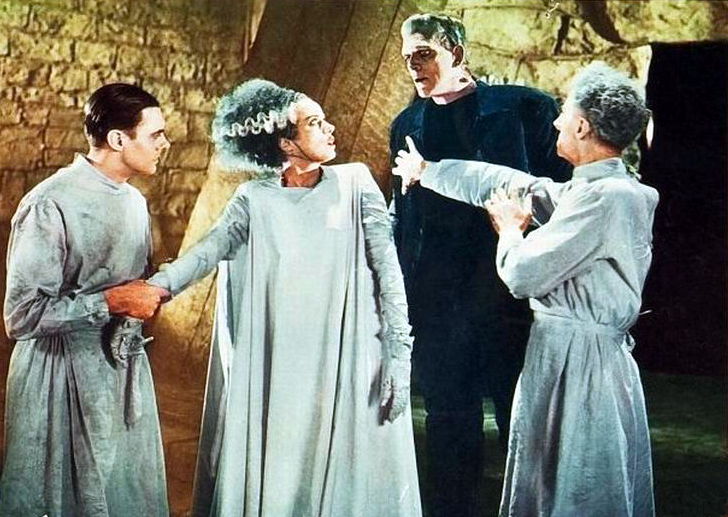
Dr. Pretorius (Ernest Thesiger, right) in the film The Bride of Frankenstein.

The novel has been compared to the works of Gaston Leroux, who combines detective fiction with the fantastic, and to The Name of the Rose by Umberto Eco, whose monk-detective William of Baskerville shares investigative qualities with Machiavelli. McAuley, however, clarifies that this similarity arises from the shared Holmesian influence on both novels rather than direct inspiration from Eco’s work. Another reference to popular culture appears in the character of Doctor Pretorius, taken from James Whale’s 1935 film The Bride of Frankenstein. In the film, loosely based on Mary Shelley’s Frankenstein; or, The Modern Prometheus, the mad scientist Septimus Pretorius conducts experiments to animate inanimate flesh, paralleling McAuley’s portrayal. The character is further developed in McAuley’s short story The Temptation of Dr. Stein, which incorporates elements from the golem legend—an artificial being from Jewish mythology lacking free will and entirely subject to its master.

=== Reflection on scientific progress ===
In Pasquale's Angel, McAuley, primarily a science fiction author, explores the theme of scientific and technological progress, defined as an improvement in production methods through the refinement of machines and the mechanization of labor. In the novel, Leonardo da Vinci introduces innovative inventions that lead, as writer John Clute notes, to a transition “from organic life to industrial life (from Gemeinschaft to Gesellschaft (Note: That is, according to the work of sociologist Ferdinand Tönnies, from community to society, from a collective entity founded on reciprocal sentiments to a group of individuals bound by reasoning or calculation. According to Tönnies, the advent of the industrial era in the 19th century had as its main sociological consequence the transformation of humanity from a state of Gemeinschaft, or community, to that of Gesellschaft, or society.)), from ad hoc technical creation to a feared engineering,” reflecting aspects of the 19th-century industrial revolution. McAuley also highlights the separation of art and technique as one of these developments.

This distinction between the activity of the artist and that of the engineer is apparent in da Vinci, but it did not exist before simply because it was not recognized. No one saw any real difference between the condition of the artist and that of the craftsman. It was the same thing: since there was no mass production, making frames for paintings was valued just as much as painting them, as an important aspect of the artist’s work. And if you look at the very old frames that surround Renaissance paintings, you’ll see what I mean. Learning how to make them was part of an artist’s training. Since then, we’ve experienced a specialization, and da Vinci embodies the first appearance of this modern dichotomy between art and science, which is why, in my opinion, we’re so fascinated by him.

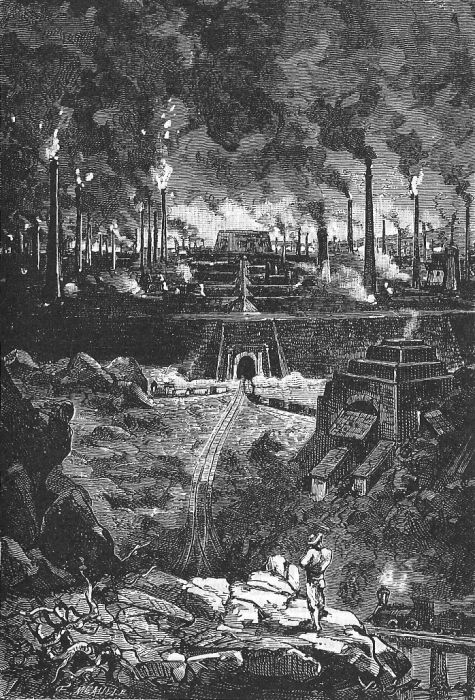
Stahlstadt, the industrial city of the Five Hundred Million of the Begum by Jules Verne.

John Clute observes that, unlike other alternate history novels such as Pavane by Keith Roberts, where characters appear isolated amid decline, societal change is central in McAuley’s work, with characters actively engaging with transformation. The theme of progress is therefore central to the novel. However, progress is not presented uncritically; Pasquale's Angel depicts the negative consequences of technological advancement, including pollution, social violence, and worker exploitation. According to critic Robert K. J. Killheffer, this serves as a critique of "the worst weaknesses of the capitalist system." Some characters, such as an old worker encountered by Pasquale and Machiavelli, express skepticism or hostility toward industrialization, reflecting concerns relevant to contemporary society:

They say the artificers have given men the freedom to progress, but keeping up with the pace of their machines, men like me become less than beasts of burden: they work us as long as we can still stand, and when we collapse, they toss us aside.

The dystopian aspect of the novel is reinforced by the extreme centralization of power in the hands of a single figure, the Grand Engineer:

At the heart of the new Florence rises a vast building, the tower where old Leonardo lives in solitude with his catamite and his servants, like a kind of satanic anthropologist. This tower is the center of a vast network of communication relays. Like the sentient computer in The Difference Engine, it is all eyes: through various openings, high above the dominated city, complex optical systems constantly monitor human lives, reduced to counters on a map.

According to Benoît Domis, McAuley thus follows the continuity of his previous works by “once again raising the question of scientific responsibility. Can the artificers […] so easily take refuge behind an inevitable progress to avoid feeling guilty for the upheavals caused by their work? Who is responsible for the division of the city into two, between very wealthy merchants and a labor force that is very poor and deskilled by the wonders developed by da Vinci? Of course, Paul McAuley does not provide the answer, but his questions echo for a long time in the attentive reader’s mind: progress, yes, but for whom?”

== Sequel project ==
In an interview published in August 1998 in Locus magazine, Paul J. McAuley announced plans for a sequel to Pasquale's Angel, set one hundred years after the original novel. The sequel was intended to explore European colonization of the Americas under a more scientific context, with implications for slavery and the fate of indigenous peoples, potentially involving a “counterfactual Holocaust.” In December 1999, McAuley provided further details, stating the story would take place fifty years after Pasquale's Angel and follow a quest for the legendary golden cities of Cibola across the Americas. However, the project was hindered by the publisher Gollancz, which retained rights to the original novel, preventing other publishers from releasing the sequel. As a result, the sequel was ultimately abandoned.

== See also ==
- Paul J. McAuley
- Republic of Florence
- Uchronia
- Steampunk

== Bibliography ==
- McAuley, Paul J. (1994). Pasquale's Angel. Illustrated by Jim Burns. Victor Gollancz Ltd. ISBN 0-575-05489-1.
- McAuley, Paul J. (1994). "The Temptation of Dr Stein". The Mammoth Book of Frankenstein. Constable & Robinson. ISBN 1-85487-330-X.
- McAuley, Paul J. (2004). Les Conjurés de Florence, suivi de La Tentation du Dr Stein [Pasquale's Angel, followed by The Temptation of Dr. Stein]. Folio SF (in French). Translated by Deparis, Olivier; Caillava, Marie-Catherine. Illustrated by Gil Formosa. Éditions Gallimard. ISBN 2-07-030286-5.
