= Allohistory =

The term "allohistory" may refer to:

- Alternate history, a form of historical fiction that speculates what would have happened had history gone differently
- Counterfactual history, this speculation used in a real-world setting
- Uchronia, a form of historical fantasy that posits a fictional "what may have happened" (as in The Lord of the Rings)
