= In the Mouth of the Whale =

2012 novel by Paul J. McAuley

- Author: Paul J. McAuley
- Cover artist: Sidonie Beresford-Browne
- Language: English
- Series: Quiet War #3
- Genre: Science fiction
- Publisher: Gollancz
- Publication date: January 2012
- Publication place: United Kingdom
- Pages: 376
- ISBN: 978-0575079366
- Preceded by: Gardens of the Sun
- Followed by: Evening's Empires

In the Mouth of the Whale is a 2012 science fiction novel by Paul J. McAuley, the third in his Quiet War sequence.

== Summary ==
While The Quiet War and Gardens of the Sun were set in a mid-term future Solar System, In the Mouth of the Whale is spatially and temporally much further out, set thousands of years in the future around a Fomalhaut system long since colonised by refugees from the Quiet War. The first settlers, the Quick, have since been superseded by the True who are in turn challenged by the posthuman Ghosts.

The story is told from the point of view of three characters. The first, the Child, believes she lives in a village in the conflict-torn Amazon. She becomes transfixed by a mysterious boy with the head of the jaguar but in reality, her world is part of an elaborate, failing, simulation created on a damaged starship that is finally on the verge of reaching Fomalhaut. The crew created the simulation based on her experiences of life before the Quiet War and hold her in high regard, however, those already at Fomalhaut know of her impending arrival.

The second, Ori, is one of the Quick. She remotely pilots maintenance spacecraft around the Whale space station, which orbits the gas giant Cthunga. The Whale station is attempting to make contact with a mind which had crashed into the planet long ago and is thought by the True to have transcended. It is Ori who witnessed what could be a sign from the Mind, which quickly attracts the attention of the True.

The third strand is the Librarian, who with his assistant Horse kills demons to atone for having caused the death of two of his comrades. These "demons" are the corrupted remains of Quick technology but when he is faced with a mission which parallels the tragedy from his past, he begins to see a way in the Library itself. These three strands converge as the Ghosts and True are drawn inexorably into conflict.

== Reception ==
The reception for In the Mouth of the Whale was more mixed than the previous two novels in the series. In Strange Horizons, Paul Kincaid received the novel positively, praising how McAuley "draws us in to the story, and holds us there, feverishly turning the pages to keep up with rapidly evolving events." However, he didn't feel that the novel matched the high standards of its predecessors, noting that "[a] layer of political and emotional complexity is missing from the new novel. Maybe it is better to read it as a standalone work, completely detached from what went before."

Greg L. Johnson's review was more positive, concluding "[i]n short, everything we've come to expect from Paul McAuley at his best."
