= The Invisible Country =

- Author: Paul J. McAuley
- Language: English
- Publication date: 1996

The Invisible Country is a 1996 novel written by Paul J. McAuley.

== Plot summary ==
The Invisible Country is a novel in which the stories are structured as a series of interconnected narratives—each introduced with commentary and supported by recurring motifs—the novel skips across various European settings, including England and Holland.

== Reception ==
Jonathan Palmer reviewed The Invisible Country for Arcane magazine, rating it an 8 out of 10 overall, and stated that "This is the author's first outing since Fairyland, which I preferred, but it is still a good book, made all the more commendable for its timely comment on the global fragmentation of our society. If you're hoping to bring real politics into your campaigns, as inevitably you must, there are some interesting angles for consideration here."

== Reviews ==
- Review by Gary K. Wolfe (1996) in Locus, #431 December 1996
- Review by Peter Crowther [as by Pete Crowther] (1997) in Interzone, September 1997
- Review by K. V. Bailey (1998) in Vector 197
- Review by Paul Di Filippo (1998) in Asimov's Science Fiction, October-November 1998
- Review by Russell Letson (1998) in Locus, #455 December 1998
- Review by Greg L. Johnson (1998) in SF Site, Mid-December 1998, (1998)
- Review by F. Brett Cox (2000) in The New York Review of Science Fiction, March 2000
- Review by Colin Steele (2001) in SF Commentary, #77
