= Paul J. McAuley =

British botanist and science fiction author (born 1955)

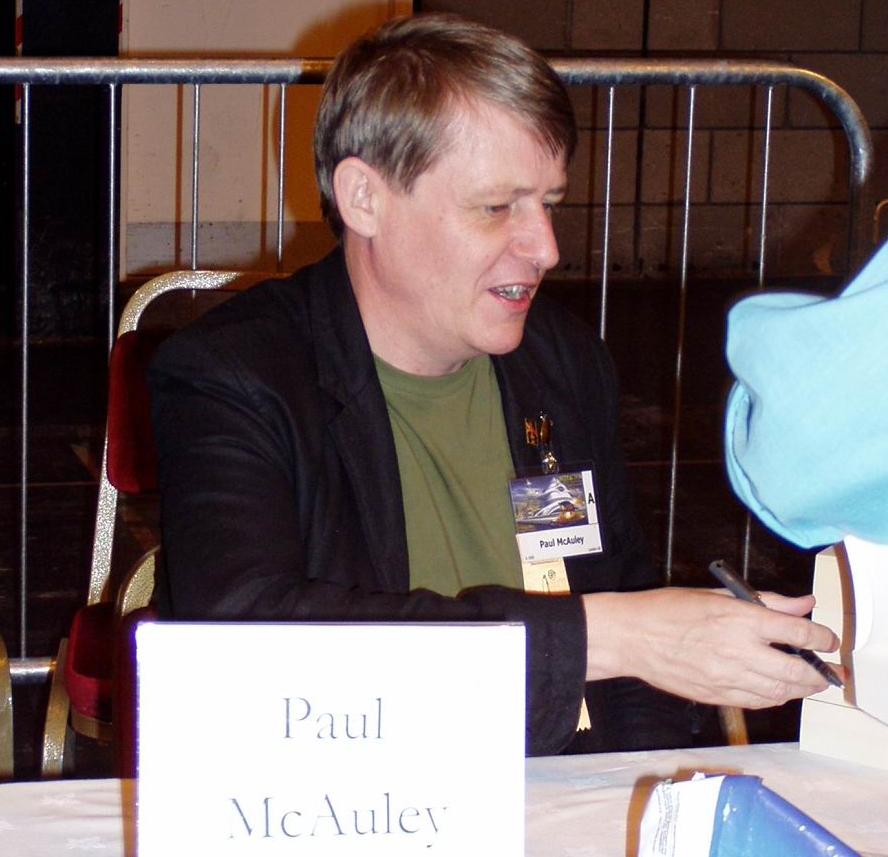
Paul McAuley at Worldcon 2005 in Glasgow

Paul J. McAuley (born 23 April 1955) is a British botanist and science fiction author. A biologist by training, McAuley writes mostly hard science fiction. His novels deal with themes such as biotechnology, alternative history/reality, and space travel.

McAuley began writing science fiction with the far-future space-opera novel Four Hundred Billion Stars, its sequel Eternal Light, and the planetary-colony adventure Of the Fall. The novel Red Dust, set on a far-future Mars colonized by the Chinese, is a planetary romance featuring many emerging technologies and science fiction motifs: nanotechnology, biotechnology, artificial intelligence, personality downloads, and virtual reality. His Confluence series, set in an even more distant future (about ten million years from now), is one of multiple novels that use Frank J. Tipler's Omega Point Theory as a theme; in this theory, the universe seems to be evolving toward a maximum degree of complexity and consciousness. Around the same time, McAuley published the novel Pasquale's Angel, set in an alternative Italian Renaissance; it features Niccolò Machiavelli and Leonardo da Vinci as major characters.

McAuley has also used biotechnology and nanotechnology themes in near-future settings: the novel Fairyland describes a dystopian, war-torn Europe where genetically engineered "dolls" are used as disposable slaves. Since 2001, he has produced several techno-thriller novels based on science fiction, such as The Secret of Life, Whole Wide World, and White Devils.

Four Hundred Billion Stars, his first novel, won the Philip K. Dick Award in 1988. Fairyland won the 1996 Arthur C. Clarke Award and the 1997 John W. Campbell Memorial Award for Best SF Novel. The short story "The Temptation of Dr. Stein" won the British Fantasy Award. Pasquale's Angel won the Sidewise Award for Alternate History (Long Form).

== Bibliography ==
=== Novels ===
- Red Dust. London: Gollancz, 1993. ISBN 9780575054882
- Pasquale's Angel. London: Gollancz, 1994. ISBN 9780575054899 — Clarke and British Fantasy Awards nominee, 1995, Sidewise Award winner
- Fairyland. London: Gollancz, 1995. ISBN 9780575060708 — BSFA Award nominee, 1995; Clarke Award winner, 1996; Campbell Award winner, 1997
- The Secret of Life. London: Voyager, 2001. ISBN 9780002259040 — BSFA Award nominee, 2001; Clarke Award nominee, 2002
- Whole Wide World. London: Voyager, 2002. ISBN 9780002259033
- White Devils. London: Simon & Schuster, 2004. ISBN 9780743238854 — Campbell Award nominee, 2005
- Mind's Eye. London: Simon & Schuster, 2005. ISBN 9780743238878 — Campbell Award nominee, 2006
- Players. London: Simon & Schuster, 2007. ISBN 9780743276177
- Cowboy Angels. London: Gollancz, 2007. ISBN 9780575079342
- Austral: London: Gollancz, 2017. ISBN 9781473217317
- War of the Maps. London: Gollancz, 2020. ISBN 9781473217348
- Beyond the Burn Line. London: Gollancz, 2022. ISBN 9781399603713
- Loss Protocol. London: Gollancz, 2026. ISBN 9781399635561

Four Hundred Billion Stars series

- Four Hundred Billion Stars. London: Gollancz. 1988. [Philip K. Dick Award winner, 1988]
- Secret Harmonies. London: Gollancz, 1989. ISBN 9780575045804. (Published in the United States as Of the Fall)
- Eternal Light. London: Gollancz, 1991. ISBN 9780575049314 — BSFA Award nominee, 1991 and Clarke Award nominee, 1992

The Confluence series

- Child of the River. London: Gollancz, 1997. ISBN 9780575064270
- Ancients of Days. London: Gollancz, 1998. ISBN 9780575064287
- Shrine of Stars. London: Gollancz, 1999. ISBN 9780575064294
- Confluence - The Trilogy. London: Gollancz, 2014. ISBN 9780575119420

The Quiet War series

- The Quiet War. London, Gollancz, 2008. ISBN 9780575079335 — Clarke Award nominee, 2009
- Gardens of the Sun. London: Gollancz, 2009. ISBN 9780575079373
- In the Mouth of the Whale. London: Gollancz, 2012. ISBN 9780575100732
- Evening's Empires: London, Gollancz, 2013. ISBN 9780575100794
- Stories from the Quiet War (2011), a collection of five stories:
  - "Making History", first published in 2000
  - "Incomers", first published in 2008
  - "Second Skin", first published in 1997 in Asimov's
  - "Reef", first published in 2000
  - "Karyl's War", first published in this collection
- Blade and Bone (2023) (novella)

The Jackaroo series

- Something Coming Through: London, Gollancz, 2015.
- Into Everywhere. London: Gollancz, 2016.
- Dust (short story) (2006)
- Winning Peace (short story) (2007)
- City of the Dead (short story) (2008)
- Adventure (short story) (2008)
- Crimes and Glory (short story) (2009)
- Bruce Springsteen (short story) (2012)
- The Man (short story) (2012)
- Something Happened Here, But We're Not Quite Sure What It Was (short story) (2016)
- Maryon's Gift (short story) (2022)

=== Short fiction ===
- The King of the Hill. London: Gollancz, 1991. ISBN 9780575050013
1. The King of the Hill
2. Karl and the Ogre
3. Transcendence
4. The Temporary King
5. Exiles
6. Little Ilya and Spider and Box
7. The Airs of Earth
8. The Heirs of Earth
- The Invisible Country. London: Gollancz, 1996. ISBN 9780575060722 — Philip K. Dick Award nominee, 1998
1. Gene Wars (1991)
2. Prison Dreams
3. Recording Angel (1995)
4. Dr. Luther's Assistant
5. The Temptation of Dr Stein (1996) (Note: Set in the same timeline than Pasquale's Angel (1994).)
6. Children of the Revolution
7. The True History of Doctor Pretorius
8. Slaves
- Little Machines. Harrogate: PS Publishing, 2005. ISBN 9781902880945
1. The Two Dicks
2. Residuals
3. 17
4. All Tomorrow's Parties
5. Interstitial
6. How We Lost the Moon, a True Story by Frank W. Allen
7. Under Mars
8. Danger: Hard Hack Area
9. The Madness of Crowds
10. The Secret of My Success
11. The Proxy
12. I Spy
13. The Rift
14. Alien TV
15. Before the Flood
16. A Very British History
17. Cross Roads Blues
- A Very British History. Harrogate: PS Publishing, 2013.
1. Little Ilya and Spider and Box
2. The Temporary King
3. Cross Roads Blues
4. Gene Wars
5. Prison Dreams
6. Children of the Revolution
7. Recording Angel
8. Second Skin
9. All Tomorrow's Parties
10. 17
11. Sea Change, With Monsters
12. How We Lost the Moon, A True Story by Frank W. Allen
13. A Very British History
14. The Two Dicks
15. Meat
16. Rocket Boy
17. The Thought War
18. City of the Dead
19. Little Lost Robot
20. Shadow Life
21. The Choice

Stories (Note: Short stories unless otherwise noted.)

Year	Title	First published	Reprinted/collected	Notes
2000	Making History	Making History. Harrogate: PS Publishing, 2000. ISBN 9781902880082		Novella
2003	The Eye of the Tyger	The Eye of the Tyger. Tolworth, Surrey: Telos Publishing, 2003. ISBN 9781903889244 (a Doctor Who novella)		Novella
2011	The Choice	"The Choice". Asimov's Science Fiction. February 2011.		The Jackaroo series
2012	Antarctica Starts Here	"Antarctica Starts Here". Asimov's Science Fiction. 36 (10&11): 48–56. October–November 2012.		
2015	Wild Honey	McAuley, Paul (August 2015). "Wild Honey". Asimov's Science Fiction. 39 (8): 36–45.		
2023	Gravesend, or, Everyday Life in the Anthropocene	Gravesend, or, Everyday Life in the Anthropocene (2023)		Novella

- "A Brief Guide to Other Histories"
- "Dead Men Walking". Asimov's Science Fiction. 30 (3): 80–93. March 2006.
- "Edna Sharrow"
- "Inheritance"
- "Planet of Fear" (2015) in Old Venus (anthology)
- "Rocket Boy"
- Set in the Jackaroo universe:
  - "Winning Peace" (2016), in the collection Galactic Empires by Neil Clarke.
  - "Something Happened Here, But We're Not Quite Sure What It Was" (2016), published as a freebie on Tor.com.

=== Non-fiction ===
- McAuley, Paul (2014). Brazil. BFI Film Classics. London: Palgrave Macmillan.

———————

Bibliography notes

== Critical studies and reviews of McAuley's work ==
- Spinrad, Norman (April–May 2013). "Doors to anywhere". On Books. Asimov's Science Fiction. 37 (4&5): 183–191. Reviews Cowboy Angels.
