= Charles Renouvier =

French philosopher (1815–1903)

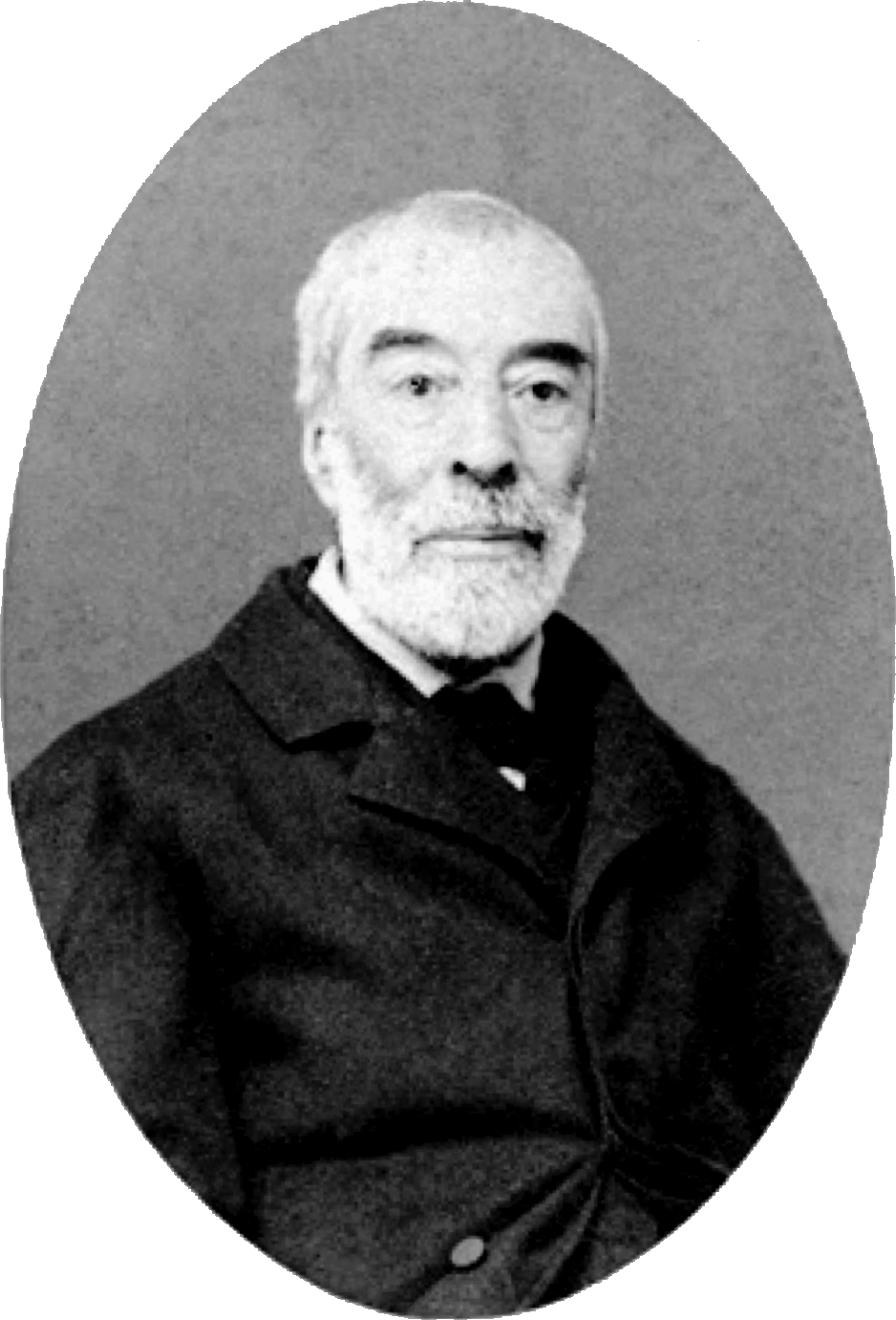
- Portrait, 1883
- Born: Charles Bernard Renouvier; 1 January 1815; Montpellier, France
- Died: 1 September 1903 (aged 88); Prades, Pyrénées-Orientales, France

Education
- Education: École Polytechnique
- Academic advisor: Auguste Comte

Philosophical work
- Era: 19th-century philosophy
- Region: Western philosophy
- School: Neo-Kantian critical philosophy
- Notable students: Émile Durkheim
- Main interests: Metaphysics, epistemology
- Notable ideas: Neocriticism, uchronia

Charles Bernard Renouvier (French: [ʁənuvje]; 1 January 1815 – 1 September 1903) was a French philosopher. He considered himself a "Swedenborg of history" who sought to update the philosophy of Kantian liberalism and individualism for the socio-economic realities of the late nineteenth century, and influenced the sociological method of Émile Durkheim.

== Biography ==
Renouvier was born in Montpellier and educated in Paris at the École Polytechnique. He took an early interest in politics, but never held public office, spending his time writing, away from public scrutiny.

== Philosophy ==
Renouvier was the first French philosopher after Nicolas Malebranche to formulate a complete idealistic system, and had a vast influence on the development of French thought. His system is based on Immanuel Kant's, as his chosen term neocriticism (néo-criticisme) indicates; but it is a transformation rather than a continuation of Kantianism.

The two leading ideas are the dislike of the "unknowable" in all its forms, and a reliance on the validity of personal experience. The former accounts for Renouvier's acceptance of Kant's phenomenalism, combined with rejection of the thing-in-itself. It accounts, too, for his polemic on the one hand against a Substantial Soul, a Buddhistic Absolute, an Infinite Spiritual Substance; on the other hand against the no less mysterious material or dynamic substratum by which naturalistic Monism explains the world. He maintains that nothing exists except presentations, which are not merely sensational, and have an objective aspect no less than a subjective. To explain the formal organization of our experience, Renouvier adopts a modified version of the Kantian categories.

The insistence on the validity of personal experience leads Renouvier to a yet more important divergence from Kant in his treatment of volition. Liberty, he says, in a much wider sense than Kant, is man's fundamental characteristic. Human freedom acts in the phenomenal, not in an imaginary noumenal sphere. Belief is not merely intellectual, but is determined by an act of will affirming what we hold to be morally good.

Renouvier's dislike of the unknowable also led him to take up arms against the notion of an actual infinite. He believed that an infinite sum must be a name for something incomplete. If one begins to count, "one, two, three ..." there never comes a time when one is entitled to shout "infinity"! Infinity is a project, never a fact, in the neocritical view.

Renouvier became an important influence upon the thought of American psychologist and philosopher William James. James wrote that "but for the decisive impression made on me in the 1870s by his masterly advocacy of pluralism, I might never have got free from the monistic superstition under which I had grown up."

== Religious views ==
In his religious views, Renouvier makes a considerable approximation to Gottfried Leibniz. He holds that we are rationally justified in affirming human immortality and the existence of a finite God who is to be a constitutional ruler, but not a despot, over the souls of people. He nevertheless regards atheism as preferable to a belief in an infinite Deity.

Renouvier rejected absolute idealism, Spinozism and classical Christian theology finding its views on an infinite, omniscient and omnipotent God to be deterministic. Instead he posited a finite personal God that was good but limited in knowledge and power. His theology preserved human free will and absolved God from evil that humans commit. He described God as the "permanent personality in the world".

== Selected publications ==
- Essais de critique générale (1854–64)
- Science de la morale (1869)
- Uchronie (1876)
- Comment je suis arrivé à cette conclusion (1885)
- Esquisse d'une classification systématique des doctrines philosophiques (1885–86)
- Philosophie analytique de l'histoire (1896–97)
- La Nouvelle Monadologie (1899)
- Histoire et solution des problèmes métaphysiques (1901)
- Victor Hugo: Le Poète (1893)
- Victor Hugo: Le Philosophe (1900)
- Les Dilemmes de la métaphysique pure (1901)
- Le Personnalisme (1903)
- Critique de la doctrine de Kant (1906)

== See also ==
- Victor Brochard – French philosopher associated with Renouvier's neo-criticism
