= Gardens of the Sun =

2009 novel by Paul J. McAuley

- Author: Paul J. McAuley
- Language: English
- Series: Quiet War #2
- Genre: Science fiction
- Publisher: Gollancz
- Publication date: 19 November 2009
- Publication place: United Kingdom
- Media type: Print, e-book
- Pages: 439
- ISBN: 978-0575079366
- Preceded by: The Quiet War
- Followed by: In the Mouth of the Whale

Gardens of the Sun is a 2009 science fiction novel by Paul J. McAuley. It was initially published by Gollancz on November 19, 2009, as a sequel to the 2008 novel The Quiet War.

== Summary ==
Although The Quiet War and Gardens of the Sun can be read as standalone novels, taken together they form the two halves of the story of the "Quiet War" of the title. The primary conflict is between the radical environmentalism of the inner system, led by the new superpower governments (such as Greater Brazil) and the posthumanism of the Outers. Having narrowly avoided the destruction of Earth's ecosystems, the feudal Greater Brazil attempted to return most of the planet to a "natural" state, to the extent that most of Earth's population inhabits a few megacities. The Outers, by contrast, survive by terraforming the moons of Jupiter and the other outer planets and practicing genetic engineering, which caused ideological tension with Greater Brazil, ultimately flaring into a full-scale conflict called the "Quiet War".

By the time of Gardens of the Sun, the war is over. The surviving Outers have been forced to Uranus, Neptune and Pluto as the superpowers of Earth raid the moons of Jupiter and Saturn for Outer knowledge. However, Greater Brazil's policies are starting to come apart under the strain of their inflexible opposition to change and democracy. The novel follows the major characters from The Quiet War in the aftermath, including the clone assassin Dave #8, ecologist Macy Minnot, Greater Brazilian diplomat Loc Ifrahim, and genetic engineer Sri Hong-Owen as they adjust to the new order of the Solar System.

Parts of the novel are modified versions of elements from the earlier short stories "The Gardens of Saturn", "The Assassination of Faustino Malarte", "The Passenger" and "Dead Man Walking".

== Reception ==
In his review for the SF Site, Rich Horton recommended The Quiet War and Gardens of the Sun as "among the best hard SF novels of recent years," giving particular praise to McAuley's construction of the setting and politics. Adam Roberts found the ending of the novel to be its weakest aspect and excessively "neat" as well as noting that the books should be combined as an omnibus but concluded that the diptych "is a very major work of contemporary science fiction, amongst the great genre achievements of the noughties, a long novel that will still be being read and remembered fifty years from now."
