= Uchronia =

Term for alternate history

Uchronia is currently an English word-in-formation, a neologism, that is sometimes used in its original meaning as a straightforward synonym for alternate history, a genre of speculative fiction that reimagines historical events going in new, imaginary directions. However, it has also begun to refer to other related concepts.

In the Spanish, French, German, Portuguese, Italian, Catalan, and Galician languages, the words uchronie, ucronia, and ucronía are native terms for alternate history from which the English loanword uchronia derives. The word is composed of the Greek prefix οὐ- ("not", "not any", and "no") and the Greek word χρόνος (chronos) "time", to describe a story set in "no time"; it was formed by analogy with the word utopia, a story set in "no place". It was coined by Charles Renouvier for his 1876 novel Uchronie, whose full title translated into English is Uchronia (Utopia in History), an Apocryphal Sketch of the Development of European Civilization Not as It Was But as It Might Have Been.

The English word, as a synonym for alternate history, has been applied for example to novels like Philip K. Dick's The Man in the High Castle and Philip Roth's The Plot Against America. However, another developing definition of uchronia is a larger umbrella category of fiction that encompasses alternate history, parallel universes, and stories based in futuristic or non-temporal settings. Yet another use of the term is for a genre of story rooted in divergences from actual history that originate as more gradual or micro-level changes, in contrast to alternate history, whose divergences have tended to be rooted in sudden and macro-level changes.

Furthermore, the goal of uchronia is sometimes now focused away from the traditional purpose of fiction as mere entertainment instead towards more practical applications in social and political discourse. In this context, it can refer to a re-imagining of a more positive history of a place than the current one, with real-world value in its implications and proposed solutions to social problems. Thus, as used by some scholars, uchronia is an alternative or whole new model for sociopolitical thinking, and not simply a genre of storytelling.

== See also ==
- Anachronism
- Steampunk
