= The Quiet War =

2008 novel by Paul J. McAuley

- Author: Paul J. McAuley
- Language: English
- Series: Quiet War #1
- Genre: Science fiction
- Publisher: Gollancz
- Publication date: 16 October 2008
- Publication place: United Kingdom
- Media type: Print, e-book
- Pages: 439
- ISBN: 978-0575079335
- Followed by: Gardens of the Sun

The Quiet War is a 2008 science fiction novel written by Paul McAuley. It was initially published by Gollancz on 16 October 2008. The novel was an Arthur C. Clarke Award Nominee in 2009.

== Summary ==
=== Premise ===
In the early 21st century, climate change and overpopulation lead to the Overturn, a cataclysmic climate event on Earth. Earth has been partially restored by climate scientists and divided into three major nation-states: Greater Brazil, the European Union, and the Pacific Community. These three great powers are oligarchies that value preservation at all costs. The Greater Brazilian government is controlled almost entirely by the powerful Peixoto family.

Decades before the main plot, war broke out between Mars and Earth. The population of Mars was wiped out. The survivors traveled to the moons of Jupiter and Saturn, becoming the Outers. The Outers evolved into a loosely connected group of city-states which prioritize democracy and practice gene manipulation antithetical to the prevailing morals on Earth.

A new fusion motor has shortened the trip between Earth and the outer systems, allowing for closer contact and increasing the opportunity for both cooperation and open conflict.

=== Plot ===
Pro-peace factions of the Greater Brazilian government hope to build a new biome in the city of Rainbow Bridge, Callisto. They are supported by genetic engineer Avernus, who was born on Earth and now lives with the Outers, promoting peace and reconciliation. Greater Brazilian scientist Macy Minnot is selected for the biome project. Several important pro-peace figures are murdered. Pro-war elements try to pin these crimes on Macy, who seeks refuge with the Outers.

Great Brazilian scientist Sri Hong-Owen is asked to spy on the biome project by a pro-war faction in Greater Brazil. Sri is constantly pulled between her loyalty to Earth and her admiration for the technical achievements of the Outers. She also secretly operates a lab on the Moon, where a group of clones (all named Dave) are being trained for military action. Dave #8 is eventually given a cover identity as an Outer and is sent to Paris, Dione.

Meanwhile, Greater Brazilian army captain Cash Baker trains as a pilot in expectation of war against the Outers. He has experimental wiring placed which allows him to have greater control over his ship.

In East of Eden, Ganymede, Macy meets drug dealer Newt Jones and teenage rebel Sada. Greater Brazilian diplomat Loc Ifrahim wants Macy to spy on the Outers, but she refuses. Newt, Sada, and Macy escape to Dione.

Cash Jones is sent on a mission to Saturn. He is chased by Outers from Dione, who believe that Earth should not claim any territory in the Saturn or Jovian systems. Tensions escalate as many Outers believe that the Earthers are encroaching on their sovereign territory. Marisa Bassei, mayor of Paris, Dione, wants to use Macy for his propaganda interviews. She responds by interviewing with Avernus instead.

Dave #8 arrives in Paris and begin to sabotage the city. During this process, Dave falls in love with Zi Lei, a Parisian woman. Macy, Loc, Avernus, and many pro-peace citizens are arrested by Marisa Bassi.

The Pacific Community seizes the uninhabited moon Phoebe, further straining tensions between Earth and the Outers. Outers drop an asteroid on Phoebe. During this action, Cash Jones is severely wounded and left alone in space.

Dave attempts to take Macy and Avernus prisoner, but fails when he is distracted by Zi Lei, who has also been arrested. Loc Ifrahim escapes. Macy and Avernus flee. As a battle rages through Paris, Loc is picked up by Brazilian troops. The Brazilians eventually defeat the Parisians and take control of the badly damaged city. Newt, Macy, and Avernus are pursued by both Sri and the wounded Cash Baker. Baker’s missiles are defused and he is killed after crashing through Saturn’s rings.

On Titan, Sri offers Avernus sanctuary and further work in genetic engineering if she surrenders. Avernus rejects this offer and uses genetically engineered filaments to tie up Sri. Avernus remains on Titan as Newt and Macy flee toward Titania.

Dave #8 wakes, having been rescued by Greater Brazilian forces. He runs away, hoping to find Zi Lei.

== Critical notes ==
Eric Brown of The Guardian noted "Few writers conjure futures as convincingly as McAuley: his latest novel deftly combines bold characterisation, a thorough understanding of political complexity, and excellent science - in this case the biology of terraforming. It's the 23rd century and humanity has split into two competing blocs: the citizens of Earth, ruled by a few powerful families, and the Outers, the descendants of dissidents who fled the repressive regimes of Earth and settled on the moons of Jupiter and Saturn. After a slow start, the novel picks up pace to present a future that is wondrous yet marred by human frailty".

Abigail Nussbaum of Strange Horizons wrote "between the flatness of its narrative and the predictability of its characters, there's not much to feel passionate about in The Quiet War, and for the first part in a series this may be a fatal flaw. The novel is undercut by not amounting to a single story—it ends as the war ends, but with the solar system still in turmoil, the political situation and ultimate disposition of Earth and the Outer colonies still unclear, and our characters hanging in limbo. On the other hand, the novel's ending isn't nearly open-ended enough to create the suspense that'll whet its readers' appetite for the next installment, and since the story itself is not much more than enjoyable, I for one don't feel any compulsion to read the next chapter. ".
