= List of audio roles of Adjoa Andoh =

British actress Adjoa Andoh has worked in several theatre, audio, radio, television, film, and video games productions since her professional debut in 1984. She has been a regular on BBC Radio 4 since the 80s, including segments of Books at Bedtime, Poetry Please, and several radio dramas.

Andoh has narrated over 150 audiobooks and has won several awards for her work.

== Audio dramas ==
Year	Title	Role	Publisher	Notes	Ref.
2004	The Tempest	Iris	Penguin Classics	A part of "Arkangel Shakespeare" collection	
2004	A Midsummer Night's Dream	Titania	Penguin Classics	A part of "Arkangel Shakespeare" collection	
2004	Two Noble Kinsmen	Hippolyta	Penguin Classics	A part of "Arkangel Shakespeare" collection	
2006	Doctor Who: The Monthly Adventures	Nurse Albertine	Big Finish Productions	Episode: "Year of the Pig"	
2016	Les Liaisons Dangereuses	Madame de Volanges	Audible	Read by the cast of the stage play	
2017	Doctor Who: Classic Doctors, New Monsters 2	Racnoss Consort	Big Finish Productions		
2018	The Soul-Breaker		Audible		
2018	Torchwood One	Fiona	Big Finish Productions	Episode: "Machine"	
2018	Doctor Who: Tales from New Earth	Sister Jara	Big Finish Productions	Episode: "The Cats of New Cairo"	
2021	Doctor Who: The Year of Martha Jones	Francine Jones	Big Finish Productions	3 episodes	
2022	Don't Mind: Cruxmont	Dr. Gwendolyn Kingston	Fool & Scholar Productions	Main role	

== Radio dramas ==
Year	Title	Role	Radio		Ref.
1991	A Midsummer Night's Dream	Titania	BBC Radio 3		
1991	Blade of the Poisoner	Dorrina	BBC Radio 5		
1991	A Woman of No Importance	Lady Stofield	BBC Radio 4		
1991	Crown Kings	American Nurse	BBC Radio 4		
1991	Grisly Tales from the Cabaret of Dr. Caligari	Donna / Ali / Estate Agent / Mrs Meagre	BBC Radio 4	4 episodes	
1991	Killing Orders	Sal / Regina	BBC Radio 4	Episodes: "Forging Ahead," "Acid Test," "Dinner Date"	
1991	The Personal History of David Copperfield	Martha	BBC Radio 4	Episodes: "The Question of My Future," "Mischief," "My Beloved Dora"	
1993	Twelfth Night	Maria	BBC Radio 4		
1994	The Green Hill	Liz	BBC Radio 4		
1996	Moths	Jeanna Duchess of Sonnaz	BBC Radio 4		
1996	The Libertine	Elizabeth Malet	BBC Radio 3		
1996	Talking to Mars	Tanya	BBC Radio 3		
1998	The Grey Woman	Amante	BBC Radio 4		
1999	Sorry About Last Night	Mrs Abasanjo	BBC Radio 4		
2000–2001	Romantic Friction	Fertility Doll	BBC Radio 4		
2004	Measure for Measure	Mariana	BBC Radio 3		
2005	Pericles	Dionyza	BBC Radio 3		
2005	Hold Back the Night	Sharon	BBC Radio 4	Episode: "Runaways"	
2006	Weak at the Top	Marian Davis / Tibet / Sam	BBC Radio 7	Episodes: "Conference," "Booty," "Values"	
2007	Caesar!	Barbaria	BBC Radio 7	Episode: "An Empire Without End"	
2007	Let Them Call It Jazz		BBC Radio 4		
2008	HMS Surprise	Diana Villiers	BBC Radio 4		
2008	Oliver Twist		BBC Radio 7	Episode: "Masks and Pistols"	
2009	Planet B	Planet B	BBC Radio 7		
2009	HighLites	Harriet	BBC Radio 4		
2009	The Great Squanderland Roof	Helen Dunkel	BBC Radio 4		
2010	The Jubilee Singers		BBC Radio 4		
2011	Our Country's Good	Duckling Smith	BBC Radio 4		
2011	I'm Still the Same Paul	Essie Robeson	BBC Radio 3		
2011	Weird Tales	Jess	BBC Radio 4		
2012	Blurred	Caroline	BBC Radio 4		
2012	Ethan Frome	Post Mistress	BBC Radio 4		
2012	Noughts & Crosses	Meggie / Jasmine	BBC Radio 4		
2012	The Great Squanderland Roof	Helen Dunkel	BBC Radio 4		
2012	The Resistance of Mrs Brown	Mrs. Crace	BBC Radio 4		
2012	The People's Passion	Priest	BBC Radio 4		
2012	A Short Gentleman		BBC Radio 4 Extra		
2012	Sea Change	Queen Elizabeth	BBC Radio 4		
2012	The Haunted Hotel	Countess Narona	BBC Radio 4		
2012	The Cave	Oracle Lady	BBC Radio 4	Episodes: "Beyond the Vermilion Border," "Cave of Faith," "The Cave Horse"	
2012–2014	Can't Tell Nathan Caton Nothing	Mum	BBC Radio 4	16 episodes	
2013	Cash Cow	Cheri	BBC Radio 4		
2014	Polyoaks	Dr. Pitcher	BBC Radio 4	Episode: "Who's Afraid of the CQC?"	
2014	The Havana Quartet	Tamara	BBC Radio 4		
2015	The Left Hand of Darkness	Ong Tot	BBC Radio 4	Episode: 1	
2015	Being Human (The Debate at Valladolid)	Alicia	BBC Radio 3		
2016	Robert Louis Stevenson: Terror in the South Seas	Uma	BBC Radio 4	Episode: "The Beach of Falesa"	
2017	A Burnt-Out Case	Narrator	BBC Radio 4		
2017	Anansi Boys	Bird Woman	BBC Radio 4		
2017	King Solomon's Mines	Gagool	BBC Radio 4		
2017	Tony Law: 21st Century Adventurer	Martha	BBC Radio 4		
2017	Oedipus the King	Jocasta	BBC Radio 3		
2018	Proposal		BBC Radio 2	Part of Radio 2's Comedy Showcase	
2018	Gather Together in My Name	Older Maya Angelou	BBC Radio 4	5 episodes	
2018	I Know Why the Caged Bird Sings	Older Maya Angelou	BBC Radio 4	5 Episodes	
2018	Singin' and Swingin' and Gettin' Merry Like Christmas	Older Maya Angelou	BBC Radio 4	5 episodes	
2018	The Heart of a Woman	Older Maya Angelou	BBC Radio 4	5 episodes	
2019	All God's Children need Travelling Shoes	Older Maya Angelou	BBC Radio 4	5 episodes	
2019	A Song Flung up to Heaven	Older Maya Angelou	BBC Radio 4	5 episodes	
2019	The Archers	Fiona Lloyd	BBC Radio 4		
2020	Riot Girls: Trumpet	Joss	BBC Radio 4		
2021	Angela Carter Collection		BBC Radio 4		
2021	Briony	Narrator	BBC Radio 4		
2022	Soloparentpals.com	Barb	BBC Radio 4		
2022	Severus	Julia	BBC Radio 4		
2022	Make Death Love Me: Antony and Cleopatra Re-Imagined	Cleopatra	BBC Radio 3		
2024	The Farewell Glacier	Announcer	BBC Radio 3		
2024	Tales of London: Hawksmoor and Others		BBC Radio 4		
2025	Venus and Adonis	Venus	BBC Radio 4		

== Audiobooks ==
Year	Author(s)	Title	Role	Ref.
2006	Diana Evans	26a	Narrator	
2006	Dorothy Koomson	My Best Friend's Girl	Narrator	
2007	Alexander McCall Smith	Tears of the Giraffe	Narrator	
2007	Alexander McCall Smith	Morality for Beautiful Girls	Narrator	
2007	Alexander McCall Smith	The Kalahari Typing School for Men	Narrator	
2007	Alexander McCall Smith	Blue Shoes and Happiness	Narrator	
2007	Alexander McCall Smith	The No. 1 Ladies Detective Agency	Narrator	
2007	Alexander McCall Smith	The Girl Who Married a Lion	Narrator	
2007	Dorothy Koomson	Marshmallows for Breakfast	Narrator	
2007	Georgie Adams	The Three Little Princesses	Narrator	
2007	Joanne Harris	The Lollipop Shoes	Narrator	
2007	Lauren St. John	The White Giraffe	Narrator	
2007	Malorie Blackman	Checkmate	Narrator	
2007	Martin Day	Doctor Who: Wooden Heart		
2008	Alexander McCall Smith	The Miracle at Speedy Motors	Narrator	
2008	Eva Ibbotson	Not Just a Witch	Narrator	
2008	Georgie Adams	The Nursery Storybook	Narrator	
2008	Julia Golding	Ringmaster	Narrator	
2008	Mende Nazar, Damien Lewis	Slave	Narrator	
2008	Nicci French	Losing You	Narrator	
2008	Olivia Lichtenstein	Mrs Zhivago of Queen's Park	Narrator	
2008	Patrick Augustus	Don't Make Me Laugh	Narrator	
2009	Alexander McCall Smith	Tea Time for the Traditionally Built	Narrator	
2009	Alexander McCall Smith	In the Company of Cheerful Ladies	Narrator	
2009	Alexander McCall Smith	The Full Cupboard of Life	Narrator	
2009	Alexander McCall Smith	The Good Husband of Zebra Drive	Narrator	
2009	Eva Ibbotson	A Company of Swans	Narrator	
2010	Alexander McCall Smith	The Double Comfort Safari Club	Narrator	
2010	Alison Weir	The Captive Queen	Narrator	
2010	Molly Brown	Angel's Day	Narrator	
2010	Nicci Gerrard	The Winter House	Narrator	
2011	Alexander McCall Smith	The Saturday Big Tent Wedding Party	Narrator	
2011	Alexander McCall Smith	Precious and the Monkeys	Narrator	
2011	Julia Jarman	The Jessame Stories	Narrator	
2011	Julia Jarman	More Jessame Stories	Narrator	
2011	Monique Roffey	The White Woman on the Green Bicycle	Narrator	
2011	Nicci French	Until It's Over	Narrator	
2011	William Nicholson	The Secret Intensity of Everyday Life	Narrator	
2011	William Nicholson	All the Hopeful Lovers	Narrator	
2012	Alexander McCall Smith	The Great Cake Mystery: Precious Ramotswe's Very First Case	Narrator	
2012	Alexander McCall Smith	The Cleverness of Ladies	Narrator	
2012	Alexander McCall Smith	The Limpopo Academy of Private Detection	Narrator	
2012	Christie Watson	Tiny Sunbirds Far Away	Narrator	
2012	Dorothy Koomson	The Rose Petal Beach	Narrator	
2012	Dreda Say Mitchell	Hit Girls	Narrator	
2012	John Harvey	Good Bait	Narrator	
2012	Kate Clanchy	Iced (The Wire)	Narrator	
2012	Noo Saro-Wiwa	Looking for Transwonderland	Narrator	
2013	Alastair Reynolds	On the Steel Breeze	Narrator	
2013	Alexander McCall Smith	The Mystery of Meerkat Hill	Narrator	
2013	Alexander McCall Smith	The Minor Adjustment Beauty Salon	Narrator	
2013	Christie Watson	Where Women Are Kings	Narrator	
2013	Dorothy Koomson	The Woman He Loved Before	Narrator	
2013	Dorothy Koomson	The Day You Left	Narrator	
2013	Dorothy Koomson	The Ice Cream Girls	Narrator	
2013	Jackie Kay	Why Don't You Stop Talking	Narrator	
2013	Jackie Kay	Reality, Reality		
2013	J.W. Ironmonger	The Coincidence Authority	Narrator	
2013	Stella Duffy	To Brixton Beach	Narrator	
2013	Stella Duffy	Lido	Narrator	
2013	Taiye Selasi	Ghana Must Go	Narrator	
2014	Alexander McCall Smith	The Mystery of the Missing Lion	Narrator	
2014	Alexander McCall Smith	The Handsome Man's De Luxe Café	Narrator	
2014	Alex Howard	Time to Die	Narrator	
2014	Ann Leckie	Ancillary Sword	Narrator	
2014	Howard Jacobson	J	Narrator	
2014	Nnedi Okorafor	Lagoon		
2014	Penny Hancock	The Darkening Hour	Narrator	
2014	Zelda la Grange	Good Morning, Mr. Mandela	Narrator	
2015	Ann Leckie	Ancillary Mercy	Narrator	
2015	Alastair Reynolds	Poseidon's Wake	Narrator	
2015	Alex Howard	Cold Revenge	Narrator	
2015	Alexander McCall Smith	The Woman Who Walked in Sunshine	Narrator	
2015	Aminatta Forna	Ancestor Stones	Narrator	
2015	Aminatta Forna	The Devil That Danced on the Water	Narrator	
2015	Ann Leckie	Ancillary Mercy	Narrator	
2015	Dorothy Koomson	That Girl from Nowhere	Narrator	
2015	Gertrude Bell, Georgina Howell	A Woman in Arabia	Narrator	
2015	Janice Hadlow	The Strangest Family: The Private Lives of George III, Queen Charlotte and the Hanoverians	Narrator	
2015	Jennifer Teege, Nikola Sellmair	My Grandfather Would Have Shot Me	Narrator	
2015	Justin Richards	Doctor Who: Time Lord Fairy Tales		
2015	Vanessa Lafaye	Summertime	Narrator	
2016	Alexander McCall Smith	Precious and Grace	Narrator	
2016	Alex Howard	A Hard Woman to Kill	Narrator	
2016	Eliot Schrefer	Endangered	Narrator	
2016	Giuseppe Catozzella	Don't Tell Me You're Afraid	Narrator	
2016	Jacquie Sharples	If Your Body Could Talk	Narrator	
2016	Jacqueline Rayner, Colin Brake, Richard Dungworth, Mike Tucker Cor Pas, Scott Handcock, Gary Russell	Doctor Who: Twelve Doctors of Christmas		
2016	Louise Millar, Alex Marwood, Tammy Cohen	Killer Women	Narrator	
2016	Maisie Reade	Read Me to Sleep	Narrator	
2016	Neil Gaiman	The Sleeper and the Spindle	Narrator	
2016	Robert Glancy	Please Do Not Disturb	Narrator	
2017	Ann Leckie	Provenance	Narrator	
2017	Ayobami Adebayo	Stay with Me	Narrator	
2017	Chimamanda Ngozi Adichie	The Thing Around Your Neck	Narrator	
2017	David Gemmell	Stormrider	Narrator	
2017	David Gemmell	Ravenheart	Narrator	
2017	David Gemmell	The Midnight Falcon	Narrator	
2017	David Gemmell	Sword in the Storm	Narrator	
2017	Ellen Wiles	The Invisible Crowd	Narrator	
2017	Fiona Barton	The Child		
2017	Jaqueline Rayner, Stephen Cole	Doctor Who: Tenth Doctor Novels	Narrator	
2017	Jaqueline Rayner, Mike Tuckerr, Paul Magrs, Richard Dungworth, Scott Handcock, Craig Donaghy	Doctor Who: Tales of Terror		
2017	Jennifer Ryan	The Chilbury Ladies' Choir	Narrator	
2017	Jesse Loncraine	In the Field	Narrator	
2017	Joanna Trollope	City of Friends	Narrator	
2017	Lesley Nneka Arimah	What It Means When a Man Falls from the Sky	Narrator	
2017	Lucinda Roy	The Freedom Race	Narrator	
2017	Lucy Hughes-Hallet, Maggie Ollerenshaw	Peculiar Ground	Narrator	
2017	Marcus Chown	The Ascent of Gravity	Narrator	
2017	Mel McGrath	Give Me the Child	Narrator	
2017	Miranda Emmerson	Miss Treadway & the Field of Stars	Narrator	
2017	Naomi Alderman	The Power	Narrator	
2017	Natasha Cooper	No More Victims	Narrator	
2017	Robyn Travis	Mama Can't Raise No Man	Narrator	
2017	S.E. Durrant	Little Bits of Sky	Narrator	
2017	Vanessa Lafaye	At First Light	Narrator	
2017	Yewande Omotoso	The Woman Next Door	Narrator	
2018	Adam Shaw, Lauren Callaghan	OCD, Anxiety, Panic Attacks and Related Depression	Narrator	
2018	Aida Edemariam	The Wife's Tale	Narrator	
2018	Alexander McCall Smith	The Colours of all the Cattle	Narrator	
2018	Ana Sampson	She is Fierce	Narrator	
2018	Angela Carter	Nights at the Circus	Narrator	
2018	Ann Leckie	Ancillary Justice	Narrator	
2018	Ann Leckie	Provenance: Booktrack Edition	Narrator	
2018	Cecelia Ahern, Lara Sawalha	Roar	Narrator	
2018	Christopher Edge	The Infinite Lives of Maisie Day	Narrator	
2018	David Gemmell	Ironhand's Daughter	Narrator	
2018	David Gemmell	The Hawk Eternal	Narrator	
2018	Michael Donkor	Housegirl	Narrator	
2018	Michael Donkor	Hold	Narrator	
2019	Alexander McCall Smith	To the Land of Long Lost Friends	Narrator	
2019	Anne Brontë	The Tenant of Wildfell Hall	Narrator	
2019	Ann Leckie	The Raven Tower	Narrator	
2019	Ann Morgan	Crossing Over	Narrator	
2019	David Williams, Morgana Robinson	Fing	Narrator	
2019	Deborah Frances-White	The Guilty Feminist	Narrator	
2019	Dorothy Koomson	Tell Me Your Secret	Narrator	
2019	Lindsey Kelk	Cinders and Sparks: Magic at Midnight	Narrator	
2019	Lindsey Kelk	Cinders and Sparks: Faries in the Forest	Narrator	
2019	Mark Billingham	In the Dark	Narrator	
2019	Namwali Serpell	The Old Drift	Narrator	
2019	Philppa Gregory	A Respectable Trade	Narrator	
2019	S.K. Vaughn	Across the Void	Narrator	
2019	Steve Cole	Ten Nasty Little Toads	Narrator	
2019	Talia Hibbert	Get a Life, Chloe Brown	Narrator	
2020	Abi Dare	The Girl with the Louding Voice	Narrator	
2020	Achala Upendran, Cassandra Khaw, Jeanette Ng, Raymond Gates, Paul Krueger, Tauriq Moosa	Not So Stories	Narrator	
2020	Adrian Tchaikovsky	Firewalkers	Narrator	
2020	Alexander McCall Smith	How to Raise an Elephant	Narrator	
2020	Bonnie Greer	Entropy	Narrator	
2020	Bonnie Greer	Hanging by Her Teeth	Narrator	
2020	David Williams	Code Name Bananas	Narrator	
2020	Dorothy Koomson	All My Lies Are True	Narrator	
2020	Elizabeth Bear	Machine	Narrator	
2020	John Bierce	The Wrack	Narrator	
2020	Karrie Fransman, Jonathan Plackett	Gender Swapped Fairy Tales		
2020	Kate London	Gallowstree Lane	Narrator	
2020	Kate Pankhurst	Fantasically Great Women Who Worked Wonders	Narrator	
2020	Kate Pankhurst	Fantastically Great Women Who Made History	Narrator	
2020	Kate Pankhurst	Fantasically Great Women Who Changed the World	Narrator	
2020	Kate Pankhurst	Fantasically Great Women Who Saved the Planet	Narrator	
2020	Kristy Applebaum	The Middler	Narrator	
2020	Lindsey Kelk	Cinders and Sparks: Goblins and Gold	Narrator	
2020	Menna van Praag	The Sisters Grimm	Narrator	
2020	Nana Oforiatta Ayim	The God Child	Narrator	
2020	Shola von Reinhold	Lote	Narrator	
2020	Sulaiman Addonia	Silence is My Mother Tongue	Narrator	
2020	Susan Goldman Rubin	Mary Seacole	Narrator	
2020	Talia Hibbert	Get a Life, Chloe Brown	Narrator	
2020	Ukamaka Olisakwe	Ogadinma, Or Everything Will Be Alright	Narrator	
2021	Alexander McCall Smith	The Joy and Light Bus Company	Narrator	
2021	Andre Norton	Gryphon in Glory	Narrator	
2021	Andre Norton	Silver May Tarnish	Narrator	
2021	Andre Norton	The Crystal Gryphon	Narrator	
2021	Andre Norton, A.C. Crispin	Gryphon's Eyrie	Narrator	
2021	Andre Norton, A.C. Crispin	Songsmith	Narrator	
2021	Buki Papillon	An Ordinary Wonder	Narrator	
2021	Fanny Blake, Mark Watson, Veronnica Henry, Eva Verde, Richard Madeley, Katie Fforde, Dorothy Koomson, Vaseem Khan, Helen Lederer, Rachel Hore, Jenny Eclair	Stories to Make You Smile	Narrator	
2021	Florence Ọlájídé	Coconut	Narrator	
2021	Jackie Kay	Bessie Smith	Narrator	
2021	Jelani Cobb, David Remnick	The Matter of Black Lives	Narrator	
2021	Judith Kerr	Out of the Hitler Time	Mama	
2021	Kate Pankhurst	Fantasically Great Women	Narrator	
2021	Lauren Groff	Matrix	Narrator	
2021	Laurie Ann Thompson	Emmanuel's Dream	Narrator	
2021	Nancy Mitford	Don't Tell Alfred	Narrator	
2021	Niel Bushnell	Doctor Who: The Ashes of Eternity	Narrator	
2021	Neil Gaiman, Terry Pratchett	Good Omens	Ensemble	
2021	Neil Gaiman	The Monarch of the Glen	Ensemble	
2021	Neil Gaiman	Black Dog	Ensemble	
2021	Nicola Williams, Bernardine Evaristo	Without Prejudice	Narrator	
2021	Nnedi Okorafor	Remote Control	Narrator	
2021	Robert Peal	Meet the Georgians	Narrator	
2021	Tina Andrews	Charlotte Sophia	Narrator	
2021	Vanessa Riley	Island Queen	Narrator	
2022	Agatha Christie, Naomi Alderman, Leigh Bardugo, Alyssa Cole, Lucy Foley, Elly Griffiths, Natalie Haynes, Jean Kwok, Val McDermid, Karen M. McManus, Dreada Say Mitchel, Kate Mosse, Ruth Ware	Marple: Twelve New Mysteries	Narrator	
2022	Alexander McCall Smith	A Song of Comfortable Chairs	Narrator	
2022	Dreda Say Mitchel, Ryan Carter	Say Her Name	Narrator	
2022	Jane Austen	Pride and Prejudice	Narrator	
2022	Manjeet Mann	Small's Big Dream	Narrator	
2022	Neil Gaiman	Coraline	Miss Forcible / Other Miss Forcible	
2022	Onyi Nwabineli	Someday, Maybe	Narrator	
2022	Philip Pullman	The Ruby in the Smoke	Narrator	
2022	Philip Pullman	The Tiger in the Well	Narrator	
2022	Philip Pullman	The Tin Princess	Narrator	
2022	Philip Pullman	The Shadow in the North	Narrator	
2022	Ruby Yayra Goka	Even When Your Voice Shakes	Narrator	
2022	Vanessa Riley	Sister Mother Warrior	Narrator	
2023	Alexander McCall Smith	From a Far and Lovely Country	Narrator	
2023	Ann Leckie	Translation Slate	Narrator	
2023	Farah Karim-Cooperr	The Great White Bard	Narrator	
2023	Jane Riordan, A.A. Milne	Once There Was a Bear	Narrator	
2023	Maria Isabel Sanchez Vegara	Little People, BIG DREAMS: Women in Science	Narrator	
2023	Maria Isabel Sanchez Vegara	Little People, BIG DREAMS: Inspiring Musicians	Narrator	
2023	Maria Isabel Sanchez Vegara	Little People, BIG DREAMS: Nature Champions	Narrator	
2023	Philippe Sands	The Last Colony	Narrator	
2023	Talia Hibbert	Talia Hibbert's Brown Sisters Book Set	Narrator	
2023	Tobi Rachel, Lady T	Discover Me	Narrator	
2024	Ann Leckie	Lake of Souls: The Collected Short Fiction	Narrator	
2024	Chimamanda Ngozi Adichie	Americanah	Narrator	
2024	Esmie Jikiemi-Pearson	The Principle of Moments	Narrator	

== Video games ==
Year	Title	Role(s)	Notes
2001	Wave Rally		
2004	Fable		
2005	Kameo	Lenya	English translation
2008	Age of Conan: Hyborian Adventures		
2008	Fable II	Supporting cast	
2010	Dante's Inferno	Background Shades / Innocents of Acre / Semiramis	
2010	Fable III	Supporting cast	
2010	Age of Conan: Rise of the Godslayer		
2012	The Secret World	Zhara / Additional Voices	
2012	Fable: The Journey		
2014	Dreamfall Chapters	Shepherd / Mother Utana / Adala	
2017	Horizon Zero Dawn	Sona / Cpl. Vandana Sarai	
2019	Doctor Who: The Edge of Time	Additional voices	
2021	Doctor Who: The Edge of Reality	Additional voices	

== Audio awards and nominations ==
=== Audiobooks ===
Year	Award/Honor	Category	Work	Result	Ref.
2013	Audie Award	Children, ages up to 8	The Great Cake Mystery: Precious Ramotswe's Very First Case by Alexander McCall Smith	Won	
2016	Audie Award	Science Fiction	Ancillary Mercy by Ann Leckie	Nominated	
2016	Audie Award	Audio Drama	The Sleeper and the Spindle by Neil Gaiman	Nominated	
2016	Audie Award	Young Adult Title	The Sleeper and the Spindle by Neil Gaiman	Nominated	
2017	Audie Award	Short Story/Collections	Killer Women: Crime Club Anthology #1 by Louise Millar, Alex Marwood, and Tammy Cohen	Nominated	
2017	Audie Award	Multi-Voiced Performance	Les Liaisons Dangereuses (1782) by Choderlos de Laclos	Nominated	
2018	Audie Award	Science Fiction & Fantasy	Provenance by Ann Leckie	Won	
2019	Audie Award	Literary Fiction or Classics	Housegirl by Michael Donkor	Nominated	
2019	AudioFile Earphones Awards	Sci-Fi, Fantasy & Horror	The Raven Tower (2019) by Ann Leckie	Won	
2019	AudioFile Earphones Awards	Romance	Get a Life, Chloe Brown (2019) by Talia Hibbert	Won	
2021	Audie Award	Romance	Get a Life, Chloe Brown (2019) by Talia Hibbert	Nominated	
2021	AudioFile Earphones Awards	Science Fiction & Fantasy	Remote Control (2021) by Nnedi Okorafor	Won	
2021	AudioFile Earphones Awards	Fiction	Matrix by Lauren Groff	Won	
2022	Audie Award	Literary Fiction or Classics	Matrix by Lauren Groff	Nominated	
2022	AudioFile Earphones Awards	Golden Voice Narrator			
2023	AudioFile Earphones Awards	Sci-Fi, Fantasy & Horror	Translation Slate (2023) by Ann Leckie	Won	

=== Audio dramas ===
Year	Award	Category	Work	Result	Ref
2023	Indie Series Awards	Best Actress - Audio Fiction	Don't Mind: Cruxmont	Nominated	
2023	NZ Web Fest	Best Performance	Don't Mind: Cruxmont	Nominated	
2023	NZ Web Fest	Best Fiction Podcast	Don't Mind: Cruxmont	Nominated	

=== Video games ===
Year	Award	Category	Work	Result	Ref.
2018	Behind the Voice Actors Awards	Best Vocal Ensemble in a Video Game	Horizon Zero Dawn	Nominated	
