= We Are the People =

We Are the People may refer to:

- "We Are the People" (Empire of the Sun song), 2008
- "We Are the People" (Feeder song), 2008
- "We Are the People" (Martin Garrix song), 2021, featuring Bono and the Edge
- We Are the People Party, an Egyptian political party

== See also ==
- Wir sind das Volk! (We are the people!)
- We the People (disambiguation)
- We Are the People We've Been Waiting For, 2009 documentary film
