= We Are the People We've Been Waiting For =

- Directed by: Daryl Goodrich
- Produced by: Caroline Rowland
- Starring: Tony Blair; Richard Branson; David Bryant; Bill Clinton; Natasha Cooper; Germaine Greer; Scott Harflett; Sandra Leaton Gray; Ken Robinson; Amy Scott; Henry Winkler
- Cinematography: Lee Pulbrook
- Edited by: Chris Barwell, Angela Trabucco
- Music by: Sacha Puttnam
- Production company: New Moon Television
- Release date: 17 November 2009
- Running time: 90 minutes
- Country: United Kingdom
- Language: English

We Are the People We've Been Waiting For is a 2009 documentary film directed by Daryl Goodrich and produced by Caroline Rowland. It explores the education system in the UK and asks whether the current system provides young people with the opportunity to develop their talents.

== Synopsis ==
We Are the People We've Been Waiting For was inspired and guided by producer Lord Puttnam, and focuses on the educational experiences of five young people in Swindon, England. The film examines three pillars on which the current education system globally is built: curriculum, testing, and teaching. It observed how millions of young people are essentially being failed by the system and explores alternative ways of tapping into the talent that exist in the rising generation.

== Cast ==
- Tony Blair
- Richard Branson
- David Bryant
- Bill Clinton
- Natasha Cooper
- Germaine Greer
- Scott Harflett
- Sandra Leaton Gray
- Ken Robinson
- Amy Scott
- Henry Winkler
