= Lake of Souls =

2024 short story by Ann Leckie

"Lake of Souls" is a 2024 science fiction short story by Ann Leckie. It was first published in her collection Lake of Souls.

== Synopsis ==
A stranded human anthropologist wanders an alien planet, and encounters a native, who is on a quest regarding souls, names, and personhood.

== Reception ==
"Lake of Souls" was a finalist for the 2025 Hugo Award for Best Novelette. In Locus, Gary K. Wolfe called it "surprisingly moving". Writing in Reactor, Natalie Zutter suggested that readers who are uncomfortable with "humans' tendency to assert what folks today call Main Character Energy" may "be more likely to identify with the lobster-dogs (...) than [with] the human anthropologists".
