= Rebekah Weatherspoon =

American author

- Occupation: Writer
- Writing career
- Language: English
- Years active: 2011 – present
- Genres: Romance; Erotica
- Notable awards: Lambda Literary Award (2017)
- Website: www.rebekahweatherspoon.com

Rebekah Weatherspoon is an American author and romance novelist. Her books often feature heroines who are black, plus-size, disabled, and LGBTQ. She founded the website WOC in Romance. Weatherspoon received a 2017 Lambda Literary Award for her novel Soul to Keep and was an honoree at the inaugural Ripped Bodice Awards for Excellence in Romance Fiction for Xeni.

== Career ==
Weatherspoon previously worked at Disney and was asked by an executive to read Twilight due to the buzz around it. She then began to read fan fiction based on the book, as well as romance novels. Weatherspoon wrote her own fanfic in digital fandom communities and received positive feedback. Her debut novel, Better Off Red, was sold un-agented to Bold Strokes Books after about three months of querying and published in 2011. She published a trilogy called FIT featuring a BDSM story line under Bold Strokes Books in 2014.

Weatherspoon has self-published and released her work through traditional publishers. She is known for featuring Black women protagonists in her books, many who are LGBTQ or plus-size. Her books often combine romance and erotica.

In 2015, Weatherspoon was influenced by the We Need Diverse Books and #WeNeedDiverseRomance campaigns to found the website WOC in Romance. The site shares information about romance novels written by women of color and those who are non-binary and gender fluid.

On February 25, 2020, she published the debut novel in the Cowboys of California series, a Cowboy to Remember, a Western romance and a remake of Sleeping Beauty. It received a starred review from Publishers Weekly. Kirkus Reviews described the book: "an amnesia plot done right and a fantastic heroine mark a strong series debut." Maureen Lee Lenker wrote in a review for EW, "most refreshingly, her cowboys don't fall prey to any of the traps of toxic masculinity that can overwhelm the sub-genre. Instead, it engages only with the positive aspects – the boot-knocking inherent sexiness of cowboys; the hard work of maintaining a ranch; and the natural ethos of family and community." A television series adaptation is in development by Valerie C. Woods' MVC Productions.

In February 2021, Weatherspoon's upcoming YA romance novel Her Good Side was acquired by Razorbill. It was published in May 2023.

== Personal life ==
Weatherspoon lives in Exeter, New Hampshire; she previously lived in southern California. She has identified as queer and pansexual.

== Accolades ==
- 2014 – Lambda Literary Award for Lesbian Erotic Fiction, Nominee (for At Her Feet)
- 2017 – Lambda Literary Award for LGBT Erotica, Winner (for Soul to Keep)
- 2018 – GO, 100 Women We Love
- 2020 – The Ripped Bodice Awards for Excellence in Romance Fiction, Honoree (for Xeni)
- 2021 – Booklist Editors' Choice (for A Thorn In the Saddle)

== Bibliography ==
- The Fling. Bold Strokes Books. 2012. ISBN 9781602826564.
- At Her Feet. 2013. ISBN 9781602829480
- Treasure. 2014. ISBN 9781626393165
- Her Good Side. 2023. ISBN 978-0-593-46530-1
- A Man For Mrs. Claus. 2024. ISBN 9798224404551.
- Summer Official. 2026. ISBN 9780593465356.

=== Series ===
==== Vampire Sorority Series ====
- Better off Red. Bold Strokes Books. 2011. ISBN 9781602825741.
- Blacker than Blue. 2013. ISBN 9781602827745
- Soul to Keep. 2016. ISBN 9781626396166

==== Beards and Bondage ====
- Haven. 2017 ISBN 9781545487273
- Sanctuary. 2017. ISBN 9781386643838
- Harbor. 2020 ISBN 9781545487273

==== Fit Trilogy ====
- Fit. 2014.
- Tamed. 2014.
- Sated. 2015.
- Wrapped. 2017.

==== Sugar Baby ====
- So Sweet. 2015. ISBN 9781539733768
- So Right. 2016. ISBN 9781539734772
- So For Real. 2016.

==== Loose Ends ====
- Rafe. 2018. ISBN 9781386119883
- Xeni: A Marriage of Inconvenience. 2019. ISBN 9780578592077

==== Cowboys of California ====
- A Cowboy to Remember. 2020. ISBN 9781496725400
- If the Boot Fits. 2020. ISBN 9781496725417
- A Thorn In the Saddle. 2021. ISBN 9781496725424
