= Adriana Herrera =

Dominican romance author

Adriana Herrera is an author of romantic fiction and erotica. She was born and raised in the Dominican Republic and now resides in New York City.

Herrera's novels overturn conventions of the historical romance genre, such as heterosexuality; for example she has written about openly lesbian relationships in Paris during the 1889 Exposition Universelle.

She was inspired to write because of a lack of romance books with Dominican, Latina, and queer characters. She was influenced by Edith Wharton. Herrera writes "unapologetically happy endings" to her stories.

A story by Herrera was collected in Best Women's Erotica of the Year by Simon & Schuster in 2021.

== Awards and honours ==
Awards for Adriana Herrera
Year	Nominated work	Category	Award	Result	Notes	Ref.
2019	American Love Story		Ripped Bodice Award for Excellence in Romantic Fiction	Won		
2022	A Caribbean Heiress in Paris		New York Public Library Best Books for Adults 2022	Listed		
2023	On the Hustle	Erotica	Audie Award	Won		
2023	An Island Princess Starts a Scandal		New York Public Library Best Books for Adults 2023	Listed		
2025	A Tropical Rebel Gets the Duke		New York Public Library Best Books for Adults 2025	Listed		
