= The Ripped Bodice =

California romance novel bookstore

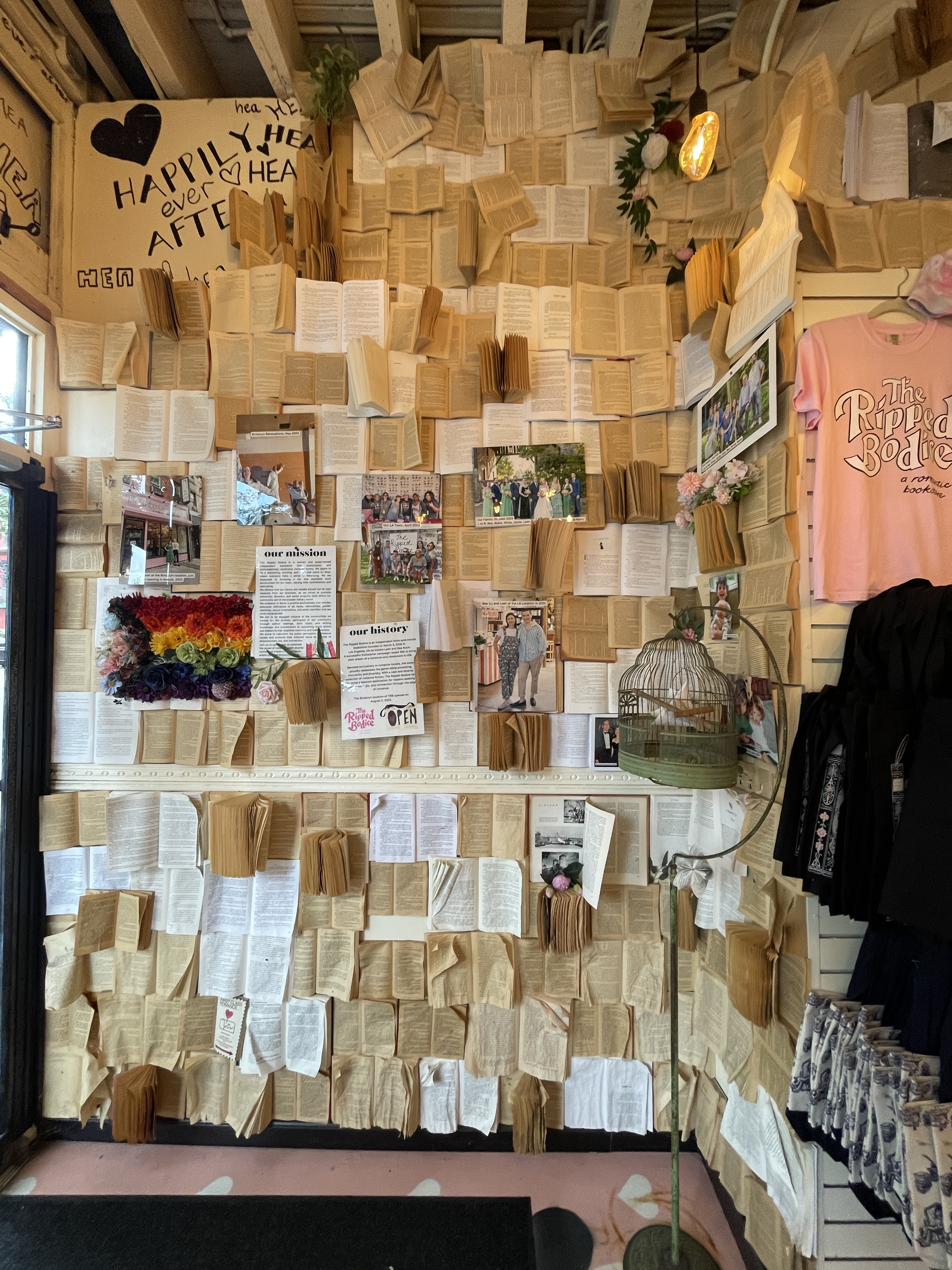
- Interior of the Brooklyn branch

General information
- Type: Bookstore
- Location: Culver City, California; Brooklyn, New York, United States
- Coordinates: 34°1′31″N 118°23′41″W

Website
- www.therippedbodice.com

The Ripped Bodice, established on March 4, 2016, is a bookstore in Culver City, California, in the United States, which sells only romance novels. It was the first romance book store opened in the Northern Hemisphere and expanded to a second location in Brooklyn, New York, in 2023.

== Description ==
The store was established in 2016 by Bea and Leah Koch. The sisters started a crowdfunding campaign on Kickstarter, eventually raising the $90,000 needed to open The Ripped Bodice.

Books sold in The Ripped Bodice span a variety of sub-genres within romance and erotica including historical, contemporary, paranormal, sci-fi, LGBTQ, and multilingual. The books are arranged according to these topics, rather than being organized by title or author's last name.

The Ripped Bodice hosts events in their physical store, including author signings, romantic comedy nights, book clubs and general literary events. They also arrange online book discussions. Their annual book club event, The Great Big Romance Read, has nationwide participation and has financially benefited books chosen to be discussed because of the widespread nature of the event.

In September 2018, the Koch sisters signed a contract with Sony Pictures Television to develop romance television projects.

== Diversity in Romance ==
Starting the year the store opened in 2016, the Koch sisters began releasing an annual report titled The State of Racial Diversity in Romance Publishing. This annual review displays the percentages of authors of color (AOCs) being published by the top romance publishing companies including Harlequin, Kensington, Avon Romance, Entangled, and Crimson Romance. Repeatedly, the study has revealed a disconnect between the small percentage of AOCs published, and the percentage of The Ripped Bodice's best-selling titles written by AOCs. Over the four years the study has been conducted, the percentage of published works by authors of color has increased by less than one percent.

== Romance Awards ==
In February 2020, the Ripped Bodice announced the first winners of their newly established awards for romance. The contest is titled The Ripped Bodice's Awards for Excellence in Romance Fiction and acknowledges the chosen best romance titles for 2019. Twelve books were honored, chosen by experts associated with the genre, and the winners each received $1,000. The winners included Xeni by Rebekah Weatherspoon, Mrs. Martin’s Incomparable Adventure by Courtney Milan, Get a Life, Chloe Brown by Talia Hibbert, A Prince on Paper; One Ghosted, Twice Shy; and An Unconditional Freedom by Alyssa Cole, American Love Story by Adriana Herrera, Trashed by Mia Hopkins, and The Austen Playbook by Lucy Parker. The 2020 winners were Go Deep by Rilzy Adams, Harbor by Rebekah Weatherspoon, Spoiler Alert by Olivia Dade, Take a Hint, Dani Brown by Talia Hibbert, The Care and Feeding of Waspish Widows by Olivia Waite, The Duke Who Didn’t by Courtney Milan, The Rakess by Scarlett Peckham, The Roommate by Rosie Danan, The Worst Best Man by Mia Sosa, You Had Me at Hola by Alexis Daria, You Should See Me in a Crown by Leah Johnson, and Written in the Stars by Alexandria Bellefleur.
