= Translation State =

2023 science fiction novel by Ann Leckie

- Author: Ann Leckie
- Language: English
- Series: Imperial Radch
- Release number: 5
- Genre: Science Fiction
- Publisher: Orbit Books
- Publication date: 6 Jun 2023
- Pages: 432 (hardcover)
- ISBN: 9780316289719
- Preceded by: Provenance

Translation State is a 2023 science fiction novel by Ann Leckie. Set after the events of her Imperial Radch trilogy and her novel Provenance, it follows three characters whose paths intersect with the Presger, an alien species instrumental to the universe's political balance.

The novel was a finalist for the 2024 Hugo Award for Best Novel.

== Setting ==
The Presger are a dangerous alien race; nevertheless, they respect other sentient species. By reverse engineering dissected humans, the Presger create Translators to use as diplomatic representatives to other species. Translators can pass as human, despite their different internal biology.

The Presger do not understand individuality in the same way that humans do; adult Translators have multiple bodies shared by a single mind, and whether the Presger exist as individuals at all is unclear. As a result, the Presger do not recognize or establish diplomatic relations with nations or factions, only with entire species.

A joint treaty between the Presger and recognized sentient species protects the peace. At the conclusion of Ancillary Mercy, artificial intelligences declared themselves to be a sentient species separate from humanity and requested recognition from the Presger. This set into motion the renegotiation of the treaty for all species.

== Plot ==
After hir (Note: Enae's personal pronouns are sie / hir / hirself) grandmother dies, Enae Athtur is forced to leave the family home. Sie is assigned to track down a Presger Translator who disappeared in human territory 200 years ago. Hir superiors do not expect any new results, but need to reopen the case to prevent it from being used politically against humanity during the treaty renegotiation. Regardless, Enae begins a thorough investigation.

Reet Hluid is an adoptee with no information about his biological family. He suffers from urges to vivisect or consume other humans. Reet is told by members of the Hikipi, a diasporal ethnic minority, that he could be a lost descendant of their royal family. Many Hikipi believe that the Presger are a hoax created by the Radchaai (Note: The dominant human empire introduced in Ancillary Justice.) to maintain their cultural supremacy over other human groups. Reet accepts the Hikipi beliefs to advance his status and fulfill a need for community and belonging.

Qven is a juvenile Presger Translator. As part of their life cycle, Translator juveniles must “match”, a process by which they will completely merge with another Translator to form one or two adult bodies. It is originally planned for Qven to be merged into a single body of Translator Dlar to extend Dlar's lifespan. However, the plan is scrapped after a rival juvenile attempts to forcibly match with Qven, resulting in a dangerous and traumatic partial merge. Qven learns that juveniles must match, or else they will die young.

Enae follows a lead to Rurusk Station, where Reet is assigned as hir liaison. When sie examines Reet’s DNA to test the Hikipi theory, sie discovers he is not royalty at all, but rather a descendant of the missing Translator. When Enae’s report is published, Reet is arrested and detained by Translators at the Presgers’ Treaty Administration Facility. Enae helps Reet's parents legally pursue his freedom. Meanwhile, Qven is ordered to match with Reet, since the Translators consider Reet disposable. Reet befriends Qven by teaching em (Note: Presger Translators do not have gender, considering this to be a "human thing". After meeting Reet, Qven chooses to use the nonbinary pronouns e / em / emself.) about human culture, but both desire to maintain their individuality. Dlar offers the pair a career maintaining the Presgers' system of portals if they willingly match, but threatens them with death if they appeal to the other species and fail.

Various interest groups debate whether to classify Reet as legally human. The Radchaai wish to define human as narrowly as possible in order to weaken AI rights; this also means that they would turn Reet over to the Translators. Other species and humans with nonhuman citizenship offer support for Reet both out of compassion and because the case could shift the balance of treaty politics. Qven and Reet are summoned before a committee composed of various sentient species and their ambassadors. Both Reet and Qven claim to be human. The hearing is interrupted when a Hikipi protester stabs Dlar. One of Dlar's bodies is able to transport many of the committee into a pocket dimension but is severely injured. Simultaneously, a Hikipi ship threatens to attack the facility. The threat causes a crisis, since the Presger would interpret an attack as hostile action by humanity at large.

Reet, Qven and Enae are trapped within Dlar's dimension, but Qven learns how to open the Presgers' portals. They use the portals to navigate the pocket dimension's non-Euclidean space and rescue the trapped ambassadors and staff. The committee decides Reet and Qven are both human. Qven opens a portal for security forces to assault the Hikipi ship. Reet is nearly killed by a Hikipi but is saved by Qven. Having grown close, Reet and Qven decide to merge into a single entity spread across two bodies. An AI invites them to live in the Republic of Two Systems. (Note: The independent nation established in Ancillary Mercy.) Hir assignment complete, Enae returns home.

== Major themes ==
According to a review for Locus, the novel opens with "a dollop of Austenian social machineries". When the Athtur family matriarch dies, Enae is "nearly sixty [with] no career, no friends, no lovers, no marital partners, no children". Despite the fact that Enae is not female, sie is coded as a "maiden aunt". The new matriarch's desire to "provide for" Enae in a socially acceptable way leads to the beginning of hir quest.

David M. Higgins of the Los Angeles Review of Books writes that one of the hallmarks of Leckie's work is "that small details (like a character’s obsession with trashy adventure serials) can ultimately shape and influence the largest possible events (such as the fall of an empire)". For example, Reet and Qven first bond by watching "a trashy pulp adventure series called Pirate Exiles of the Death Moons". This sparks Qven's desire to be known by e/em pronouns, and eventually to declare emself to be human and have that identity recognized by the committee. Higgins also writes that Translation State "represents an extraordinary leap forward in Leckie’s approach to representations of gender identity". In her initial novels beginning with Ancillary Justice, Leckie "thoughtfully explores an agender society", namely the Radchaai. However, the Radchaai Empire imposes their cultural norms onto others "with staggering imperial arrogance". The diversity of gender and sexuality outside the Radchaai Empire "helps to highlight how jarring it can be when Radchaai characters thoughtlessly refer to everyone as “she,” regardless of their gender identities and pronouns." Eventually, Qven and Reet declare themselves to be human. This draws attention to Leckie's belief that "individuals should have indisputable rights to self-determination and legal recognition around key categories of identity ... but that these categories are very often imposed by others." In this way, Higgins found, the novel critiques contemporary issues in the United States, such as anti-trans legislation supported by politicians like Ron DeSantis.

== Style ==
The story is told from the perspective of three point of view characters: Enae, Reet, and Qven. Enae's and Reet's chapters are narrated in third person. Qven's chapters are narrated in first person.

According to the Berkeley Fiction Review, "language is an important backdrop for the novel". The Radchaai language has only one gendered pronoun (she/her), but the novel explores how language can be adapted for new purposes. Non-Radchaai characters speaking the Radchaai language often add new pronouns such as he/him, sie/hir, and e/em to their speech. While "sie/hir" and "e/em" are used to indicate nonbinary genders, "they/them" pronouns are used to indicate genderless identities. In one scene, a Presger Translator states that "gender is something humans have", contrasting humanity's individuality against Presger culture.

== Reception ==
The novel has received critical acclaim. In a starred review, Kirkus Reviews called the novel "another of Leckie’s beautiful mergings of the political, philosophical, and personal". Publishers Weekly also gave the novel a starred review, praising Leckie's "humane, emotionally intelligent, and deeply perceptive writing ". Isabel Hinchliff of Berkeley Fiction Review gave the novel 4.5 out of 5 stars. Hinchliff called the book "a coming-of-age novel for all who need a reminder that our ongoing quest to find where we belong doesn’t stop when we turn twenty, or thirty, or even fifty."

In a review for Locus, Russell Letson praised the novel, calling it "a story about nature, identity, role – the need to belong – and pathological versions of that need: to invent an identity or place in the world, and to deny or control roles and identities of others". In another review for Locus, Adrienne Martini states that Leckie "asks big questions about trauma, power, and secrets". Martini predicted that the novel would deservedly "be on most of the award slates at the end of the year". A review for Los Angeles Review of Books called the novel "daring" and "thoughtful", stating that novels such as Translation State are performing "vital cultural work".

A review for Paste Magazine called Leckie a "luminary of modern SFF", praising the novel's exploration of deep questions and its simultaneously relatable characters. Liz Bourke of Tor.com wrote that the novel is "rooted in more personal, bounded concerns" than Leckie's previous Imperial Radch trilogy, and that the "intimate, personal stakes ... give it even more power and force than its predecessors."
