= Ancillary Mercy =

Science-fiction novel by Ann Leckie

- Author: Ann Leckie
- Cover artist: John Harris
- Language: English
- Genre: Science fiction
- Publisher: Orbit Books
- Publication date: October 6, 2015
- Publication place: United States
- Media type: Print (paperback); Ebook; Audiobook
- ISBN: 978-0-356-50242-7
- Preceded by: Ancillary Sword

Ancillary Mercy is a science fiction novel by the American writer Ann Leckie, published in October 2015. It is the conclusion of Leckie's "Imperial Radch" space opera trilogy, which began with Ancillary Justice (2013), followed by Ancillary Sword (2014). Three other novels, Provenance (2017), Translation State (2023), and Radiant Star (2026), and two short stories, "Night's Slow Poison" and "She Commands Me and I Obey", are set in the same fictional universe.

== Synopsis ==
While searching Athoek Station's slums, Fleet Captain Breq finds someone who appears to be an ancillary from a ship that has been hiding beyond the Radch's reach for three thousand years. Meanwhile, Translator Zeiat, a messenger from the alien and mysterious Presger empire arrives, as does Breq's enemy, the reactionary faction of the divided Anaander Mianaai – ruler of an empire at war with herself.

Anaander captures Athoek Station and executes members of its governing body on a live newsfeed. After this incident, Breq forges an alliance with the AI in charge of Athoek Station and begins work to disable Anaander's ships and render Station and other AIs immune to her overrides. She returns to Athoek Station and confronts Anaander with the aid of Zeiat. During the confrontation, she claims that AIs are independent, autonomous, and sentient species distinct from humanity, and thus protected by the terms of humanity's treaty with the Presger. Unwilling to risk violating the treaty, Anaander is forced to retreat.

== Reception ==
Kirkus Reviews says the novel "[w]raps up the story arc with plenty of room to tell many more tales in this universe" and praised the delivery of its central message as deft and meaningful.

== Awards ==
Ancillary Mercy received the 2016 Locus Award for Best Science Fiction Novel. It was also nominated for the 2015 Nebula Award for Best Novel and the 2016 Hugo Award for Best Novel.

== See also ==
- Provenance (novel)
- Translation State
