= The Raven Tower =

2019 fantasy novel by Ann Leckie

- Cover art for The Raven Tower
- Author: Ann Leckie
- Language: English
- Genre: Fantasy literature
- Published: February 26, 2019
- Publisher: Orbit Books
- Media type: Print, ebook
- Pages: 465 pages
- ISBN: 978-0316388696
- Website: https://annleckie.com/novel/the-raven-tower/

The Raven Tower is a 2019 fantasy novel by Ann Leckie and her first fantasy novel. The novel recounts the story of Mawat, a prince seeking to overthrow his usurper uncle and regain his rightful place as the servant of a local god. He is accompanied by Eolo, his loyal retainer. The story is told by a nature deity in both a first-person narrative and a second-person narrative.

== Plot ==
In the Raven Tower universe, many gods of varying levels of power exist. Gods may take the physical forms of animals or landmarks. Gods always speak the truth. If a god says something that is false at the time, the god must expend its energy changing the world so that the statement becomes true. A god may expend all of its energy and die doing this.

The story is narrated by The Strength and Patience of the Hill, a god who inhabits a large boulder. Strength and Patience also discusses its long life, from prehistoric times through the arrival of humans. The country of Iraden is protected by various gods, including the Raven, a god that inhabits a living raven. The capital of Iraden is the port city of Vastai. It is ruled by the Raven’s Lease, a human who is granted vast power in exchange for committing suicide when the Raven’s possessed bird dies. This act of human sacrifice provides vast power to the incubating egg from which the next raven will hatch, and be inhabited by the Raven god.

Mawat, son of the Lease and commander of Iraden’s army, receives a message that his father is ill. Mawat is accompanied by his retainer, a transgender man named Eolo. When they arrive in Vastai, Mawat’s father has disappeared, the raven is dead, and his uncle Hibal is the new Lease. Mawat publicly accuses Hibal of foul play, of threatening Vastai’s stability, and of disrupting trade relationships with other territories. In particular, members of the Xulhan Empire and their snake god are seeking a new alliance with Hibal.

The Strength and Patience of the Hill describes how the Raven once said, "The gods of Vastai will destroy the gods of Ard Vusktia," the city visible just across a strait to the north. Over many years the Raven expended his power to make this true. The war's effects spread far enough to cause the death of the High Priest and worshipers of Strength and Patience. Strength and Patience moved south to Ard Vusktia to help in its defense, but was careful to disguise its true nature. The war ended with the destruction of all of the gods in both countries except the Raven and Strength and Patience.

Eolo discovers that Mawat’s father is being held prisoner in the dungeons of the Raven Tower. He also discovers that Strength and Patience has been used by the Raven to supply the power needed to fulfill the Raven's promises to protect Vastai. In the many years since the end of the war, the Raven’s power has secretly been weakening.

Mawat, believing he is serving the Raven, inadvertently frees Strength and Patience from the mechanism the Raven had used to extract its power. The continued existence of Strength and Patience, an Ard Vusktian god, in contradiction of the statement the Raven made, slowly drained the Raven of power. It is revealed that the Raven ceased to exist just before the story begins.

Mawat is then framed for murdering a high-ranking politician. A flood causes a dysentery outbreak, and a hostile army is advancing through Iraden, revealing that the Raven is no longer able to protect Vastai. Mawat kills Hibal, thinking this human sacrifice will strengthen the Raven; however, since the Raven is dead, it instead gives power to Strength and Patience. Mawat is then killed by the snake god. Strength and Patience says, "I will kill the Snake god, protect Eolo, and leave Vastai to its fate."

As the story ends, an armada, coming from the far north, bent on destroying Vastai, is just coming into sight on the far horizon.

== Style ==
Strength and Patience describes its existence through first person narrative. It describes Eolo in the second person. This allows the reader to see the thoughts of Strength and Patience, while Eolo is only described from an external perspective. Thus, though we can see Eolo's actions, the reader is blind to his internal monologue. The contrast between the two styles invites the reader to consider whether Strength and Patience is omitting important details. Many of Strength and Patience's statements are written in the subjunctive mood or are framed as rumors.

== Background ==
The Raven Tower is a loose retelling of Hamlet by William Shakespeare. While Strength and Patience's narration is original, the plot which takes place inside Vastai parallels the plot of the original Shakespearean story. Mawat serves as the analogue for Hamlet, while his loyal retainer Eolo serves as Horatio. Other similarities include the presence of a woman named Tikaz, who embodies some of the characteristics of Ophelia. Despite the similarities to Shakespeare's plot, a reviewer for Tor.com found that the presence of multiple gods in the story "reweaves the fabric of Shakespeare’s play into cloth of a different colour entirely."

== Reception ==
The novel received acclaim from critics. Kirkus Reviews gave a positive review, praising its "philosophical musings about politics, power, and revenge" and applauding its depth despite a relatively short page count for a fantasy novel. A reviewer for The Guardian called it "groundbreaking" and "a gripping tale of intrigue and politics". A reviewer for NPR praised its exploration of the political system of Vastai, as well as the contrast between the narratives of the human characters and the gods. Reviews for Locus magazine praised the story's originality despite its use of familiar building blocks. The review called it "a thoughtful reimagining of a genre, a re-examination featuring... variations, inversions, and overturned expectations." The book was also praised by a reviewer from Spectrum Culture for its inclusion of a well-written transgender lead character in a genre that has not historically been kind to queer characters.

The Raven Tower was shortlisted for the 2020 Hugo Award for Best Novel; however, Leckie chose to withdraw it from the ballot, on the grounds that her works had already been Best Novel finalists on four occasions, and she felt that there had been many works by other authors in 2019 which were equally deserving of the nomination.
