= Talia Hibbert =

British novelist

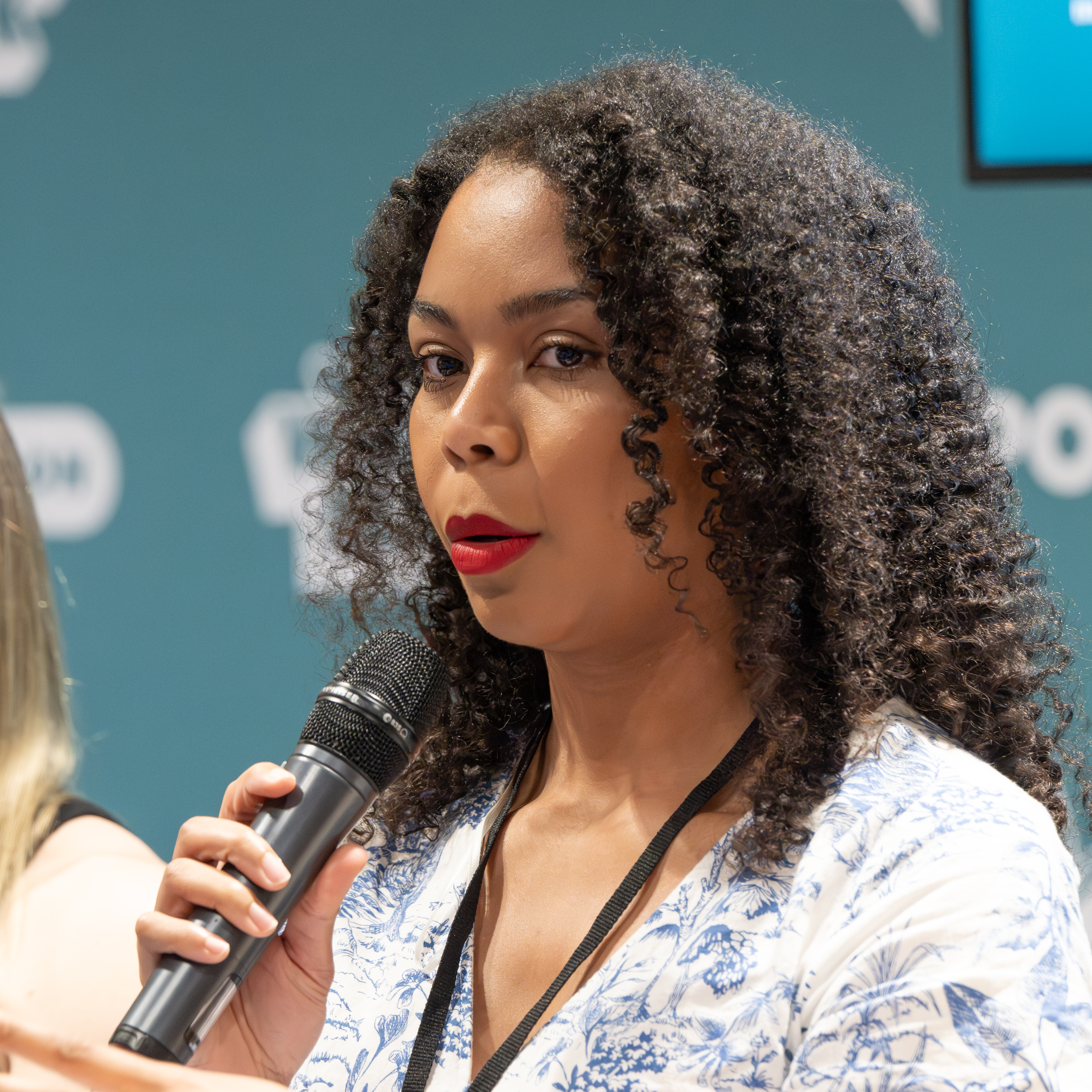
- At MCM London Comic Con, 22 May 2026
- Occupation: Novelist
- Writing career
- Language: English
- Years active: 2017–present
- Genre: Romance fiction
- Notable work: Get a Life, Chloe Brown
- Website: taliahibbert.com

Talia Hibbert is a British romance novelist. She writes contemporary and paranormal romance. She is known for writing diverse narratives with characters of varying life experiences. She is best known for her 2019 novel Get a Life, Chloe Brown.

== Early life and education ==
Hibbert was born to a mixed Roma and Sierra Leonean mother and a father of Jamaican heritage whose parents arrived in Britain as part of the Windrush generation. Hibbert studied at the University of Leicester. It was during her final year at university that she decided to pursue writing professionally.

== Career ==
Hibbert used an inheritance from her great-grandmother to finance the beginning of her writing career. She writes under the name Talia Hibbert as her legal name is "apparently difficult to pronounce." She began self-publishing in 2017, putting out ten books in that first year. Her first traditionally published book Get a Life, Chloe Brown was released in 2019 with Avon Romance and is the first book of a family romance trilogy.

Her debut fantasy romance, The Last Thorn, will be published in summer 2026.

=== Themes ===
Many of Hibbert's books can be described as part of the #ownvoices movement, with her characters being part of marginalized groups with which Hibbert also identifies. Many of her protagonists are Black women. The main character in Get a Life, Chloe Brown lives with chronic pain. In her book A Girl Like Her, the main character is autistic. The third book in The Brown Sisters series, Act Your Age, Eve Brown, features two autistic leads.

Hibbert's stories include characters with a diverse range of body types. She has stated that "it's always been really, really important to me that I represent diverse body types in my romance to show that all different kinds of people can be attractive and all different kinds of people deserve happy endings."

In Get a Life, Chloe Brown, she explores the strain that chronic pain can place on both familial and romantic relationships while also showing people with chronic pain are deserving and capable of having loving relationships.

Hibbert's books reflect a larger change in the romance genre moving toward explicit consent during sex scenes.

In the author's LGBTQ romance Work For It, one of the protagonists deals with finding love while living with depression.

== Personal life ==
For much of her life, Hibbert struggled with undiagnosed health issues, until she was diagnosed with fibromyalgia. She also has Ehlers–Danlos syndrome. Hibbert's issues with doctors inspired her to write about medical discrimination in Get a Life, Chloe Brown.

Hibbert is queer and autistic. She uses she, he, and they pronouns.

== Bibliography ==
Title	Series	Publication year	ISBN/ASIN
Always with You		2017	B074P1NY4T
Operation Atonement		2017	B075W2PL6N
Bad for the Boss	Just for Him #1	2017	B076XJJZHT
Merry Inkmas		2017	B077NTCPVP
Undone by the Ex-Con	Just for Him #2	2018	B078JM9D7Y
The Princess Trap	Dirty British Romance #1	2018	B079K8MFJD
A Girl Like Her	Ravenswood #1	2018	B07B9Z6846
The Roommate Risk (previously named Wanna Bet?)	Dirty British Romance #2	2018	B07C5LMBJ6
Damaged Goods	Ravenswood #1.5	2018	B07DFQXNM9
The Fake Boyfriend Fiasco (previously named Sweet on the Greek)	Just for Him #3	2018	B07FK6LQ7V
Untouchable	Ravenswood #2	2018	B07G4KDTKK
Mating the Huntress		2018	B07HLV1R85
Rogue Nights	Rogue #6	2018	B07JKQPZ9B
That Kind of Guy	Ravenswood #3	2019	9781916404335
Work For It		2019	1230003333167
Get a Life, Chloe Brown	The Brown Sisters #1	2019	9780062941220
Guarding Temptation		2020	1230003816226
Take a Hint, Dani Brown	The Brown Sisters #2	2020	9780062941237
Wrapped Up in You		2020	9781774532645
Act Your Age, Eve Brown	The Brown Sisters #3	2021	9780062941275
Highly Suspicious and Unfairly Cute		2023	9780593482339

== Awards ==
Awards for Talia Hibbert
Year	Nominated work	Category	Award	Result	Notes	Ref.
2019	Get a Life, Chloe Brown		The Ripped Bodice Award for Excellence in Romantic Fiction	Won		
2021	Take a Hint, Dani Brown	Bisexual Fiction	Lambda Literary Award for Bisexual Literature	Finalist		
2021	Act Your Age, Eve Brown		New York Public Library Best Books of 2021	Listed		
