= Lauren St John =

Author

- Born: December 1966 (age 59); Gatooma, Rhodesia (now Kadoma, Zimbabwe)
- Occupation: Author
- Writing career
- Notable work: The White Giraffe
- Notable awards: 2011 Blue Peter Book Award

Lauren St John (born December 1966) is an author born in Rhodesia, now Zimbabwe. She is best known for her children's novels including The White Giraffe and Dead Man's Cove which won her a Blue Peter Book Award in 2011.

== Life and career ==
Lauren St John was born in December 1966 in Gatooma, Rhodesia (now Kadoma, Zimbabwe). When she was eleven, St John and her family moved to a nature reserve called Rainbow End's farm in Gadzema. It was later the focus of her memoir, Rainbow's End and many of her children's books are influenced by the nature reserve in which she grew up.

After studying journalism in Harare St John moved to London where she was the golf correspondent for The Sunday Times for almost a decade.

In 2011, St John won the Blue Peter Book of the Year Award for her book Dead Man's Cove, about an eleven year old girl called Laura Marlin who becomes a detective. It is the first in a series of books. Dead Man's Cove was also shortlisted for a Galaxy National Book Award for Children's Book of the Year. The book was optioned by Centurion Television in 2016.

As well as writing, St John has also done work with the wildlife charity, Born Free Foundation. She became involved after contacting the Foundation while she was running a school conservation project called Animals Are Not Rubbish in 2009.

=== Children's fiction ===
Early Readers series

- Shumba's Big Adventure (2013) ISBN 1444008021
- Anthony Ant Saves the Day (2015) ISBN 1444008048
- A Friend for Christmas (2016) ISBN 1444008064
- Mercy and the Hippo (2017) ISBN 1444008099

Animal Healer series

- The White Giraffe (2006) ISBN 0803732112
- Dolphin Song (2007) ISBN 1842555332
- The Last Leopard (2008) ISBN 1842556673
- The Elephant's Tale (2009) ISBN 1842556193
- Operation Rhino (2015) ISBN 144401272X

Laura Marlin mysteries

- Dead Man's Cove (2010) ISBN 1444000209
- Kidnap in the Caribbean (2011) ISBN 1444000217
- Kentucky Thriller (2012) ISBN 1444000225
- Rendezvous in Russia (2013) ISBN 9781444009446
- The Midnight Picnic (2014) ISBN 9781444012286
- The Secret of Supernatural Creek (2017) ISBN 1510102647

Wolfe and Lamb Mysteries

- Kat Wolfe Investigates (2018) ISBN 9780374309589
- Kat Wolfe Takes the Case (2019) ISBN 9780374309619
- Kat Wolfe on Thin Ice (2021) ISBN 9780374309640

Stand-alone novels

- The Snow Angel (2017) ISBN 9781786695895
- Wave Riders (2022) ISBN 9780374309671

=== Young adult fiction ===
The One Dollar Horse series

- The One Dollar Horse (2012) ISBN 1444002694
- Race the Wind (2013) ISBN 1444002708
- Firestorm (2014) ISBN 1444002716

Stand-alone books

- The Glory (2015) ISBN 9781444012750

=== Adult fiction and non-fiction ===
Fiction

- The Obituary Writer (2013) ISBN 1409127184

Non-fiction

- Rainbow's End: A Memoir of Childhood, War and an African Farm (2007) ISBN 0743286790
- Hardcore Troubador: The Life and Near Death of Steve Earle (2002) ISBN 0007161255
