= Ancillary Sword =

Science fiction novel by Ann Leckie

- Author: Ann Leckie
- Cover artist: John Harris
- Language: English
- Genre: Science fiction
- Publisher: Orbit Books
- Publication date: 7 October 2014
- Publication place: United States
- Media type: Print (paperback); Ebook; Audiobook (read by Adjoa Andoh)
- Awards: Locus Award for Best Science Fiction Novel (2015)
- ISBN: 978-0-316-24665-1
- Preceded by: Ancillary Justice
- Followed by: Ancillary Mercy

Ancillary Sword is a science fiction novel by the American writer Ann Leckie, published in October 2014. It is the second novel in Leckie's "Imperial Radch" space opera trilogy, which began with Ancillary Justice (2013) and ended with Ancillary Mercy (2015). The novel was generally well-received by critics, received the BSFA Award for Best Novel and the Locus Award for Best Science Fiction Novel, and was nominated for the Nebula and Hugo awards.

== Synopsis ==
Anaander Mianaai, the Lord of the Radch – or the part of her personality that opposes the further militant expansion of the empire – adopts Breq into her house, appoints her Fleet Captain, puts her in command of the warship Mercy of Kalr, and charges her to protect the remote Athoek system. Breq's crew includes her old comrade Seivarden and the young Lieutenant Tisarwat, who is revealed to be a hastily converted ancillary copy of Anaander herself. After Breq recognizes Tisarwat as an unwilling ancillary of Anaander, she has the ancillary's implants removed, allowing Tisarwat to develop a hybrid personality.

At Athoek Station, Breq seeks out Basnaaid, the sister of Awn, an officer that Breq as the ship Justice of Toren, once loved and, on Anaander's orders, killed. She meets Dlique, translator for the alien race the Presger. Dlique is killed in a scuffle with ancillaries of Sword of Atagaris – the other warship on station commanded by Captain Hetnys, Breq's nominal subordinate. To hopefully placate the powerful aliens, Breq and Hetnys enter formal mourning on the estate of Fosyf, a prominent tea planter who holds her workers, transportees from other Radch-conquered worlds, in conditions akin to serfdom.

After Breq survives an attempt on her life by Raughd, Fosyf's abusive heir, she suspects that somebody is abducting suspended transportees, possibly an ancient warship seeking to replenish its crew of ancillaries. Hetnys and her ship move against Breq, apparently serving the other half of Anaander Mianaai, but they are subdued after Breq holds Hetnys hostage.

== Reception ==
=== Critical reception ===
Liz Bourke of Tor.com characterized Ancillary Sword as surpassing Leckie's debut novel, being more of a character-focused "extended meditation on power, and identity, and morality" than its predecessor, and exhibiting Leckie's broad and deep worldbuilding. But she considered that it fell "prey to a certain amount of Middle Book Problem", with a narrative that felt slower because it lacked the parallel past and present plotlines of the prequel. In io9, Annalee Newitz appreciated the novel as "a gripping read, with top-notch worldbuilding and a set of rich subtexts about human rights, colonialism – and (yes) hive mind sex", but noted the lack of a strong narrative thread, as well as Breq's "holier-than-thou facade" reducing the impression of ambivalence that characterizes a realistic character.

Kirkus Reviews called the novel "something of a retread but still interesting". The reviewer appreciated the characterization of Breq as a former AI who feels "lonely and limited" in her human body rather than wanting to become human (a more common trope in science fiction), but noted the "groaningly obvious moral" in Leckie's portrayal of a highly stratified society. In The New York Times, N. K. Jemisin similarly focused on the "quintessentially inhuman" Breq's difficulty to understand other people as the novel's most powerful element, and as a challenge to sci-fi's tropes of "disabled people being made whole by technology, and (...) nonhumans inexplicably yearning for humanity".

NPR notes that "Ancillary Sword is, quite contentedly, a different beast" in comparison to its predecessor and says "Sword is more directly political than Justice". A reviewer for Canada's National Post called the all-female pronoun usage an "almost alienating trick" referring to the first book but yields to the usage by saying it "has become imperceptible by the end of Ancillary Sword". The Portsmouth Review appreciated the fusion of emotion with AI and said the series "dominates in the genre of artificial intelligence by fusing it with the perfect amount of human emotion".

=== Awards ===
Ancillary Sword received the 2014 BSFA Award for Best Novel and the 2015 Locus Award for Best Science Fiction Novel. It was also nominated for the 2014 Nebula Award for Best Novel and the 2015 Hugo Award for Best Novel.
