= Get a Life, Chloe Brown =

2019 novel by Talia Hibbert

- Author: Talia Hibbert
- Language: English
- Series: The Brown Sisters
- Genre: Fiction, Romance
- Publisher: Avon Romance
- Publication date: 2019
- ISBN: 9780062941206
- Followed by: Take a Hint, Dani Brown

Get a Life, Chloe Brown is a 2019 romance novel written by Talia Hibbert and published by Avon Romance. It is Hibbert's first traditionally published book from and is the first book of a trilogy following the Brown sisters. The novel was followed by Take A Hint, Dani Brown in 2020 and Act Your Age, Eve Brown in 2021.

The audiobook of Get a Life, Chloe Brown was narrated by Adjoa Andoh and published by HarperAudio.

== Background ==
Hibbert has identified Get a Life, Chloe Brown as an #OwnVoices work; the main character lives with chronic pain, like Hibbert herself. For much of her life, Hibbert struggled with undiagnosed health issues, until it was diagnosed as fibromyalgia. Hibbert's multiple issues with doctors influenced the topic of medical discrimination in her novel.

The novel explores the strain that chronic pain can place on both familial and romantic relationships, as well as showing a person with chronic pain is deserving and capable of having a loving relationship. The book explores methods of reasserting a sense of control within a life that was once ruled by illness.

== Reception ==
Get a Life, Chloe Brown was featured on the Today show and reached the best seller lists of both USA Today and The Wall Street Journal. It reached #77 on the USA Today Bestseller list.

Get a Life, Chloe Brown has been reviewed in The Washington Post. and twice on NPR. Jaime Green's review for The New York Times called Hibbert a "brilliant writer."

The novel received the Ripped Bodice Awards for Excellence in Romance Fiction in 2019.
