= Ann Leckie =

American science fiction author (born 1966)

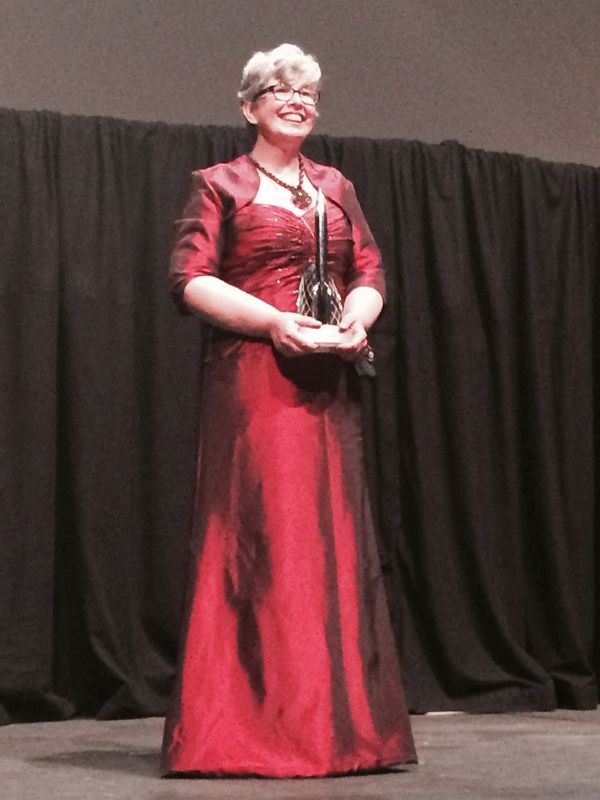
- Ann Leckie receiving the Hugo Award in 2014
- Born: March 2, 1966 (age 60); Toledo, Ohio, U.S.
- Occupation: Author
- Writing career
- Period: 2006–present
- Genres: Science fiction, fantasy
- Notable work: Ancillary Justice
- Notable awards: Hugo Award, Nebula Award, Arthur C. Clarke Award, BSFA Award, Locus Award
- Website: annleckie.com

Ann Leckie (born March 2, 1966) is an American author of science fiction and fantasy. Her 2013 debut novel Ancillary Justice, which features artificial consciousness and gender-blindness, won the 2014 Hugo Award for Best Novel, as well as the Nebula Award, the Arthur C. Clarke Award, and the BSFA Award. The sequels, Ancillary Sword and Ancillary Mercy, each won the Locus Award for Best Science Fiction Novel and were both nominated for the Nebula Award. Provenance, published in 2017, Translation State, published in 2023, and Radiant Star, published in 2026, are also set in the Imperial Radch universe.

Leckie's first fantasy novel, The Raven Tower, was published in February 2019.

== Career ==
Having grown up as a science fiction fan in St. Louis, Missouri, Leckie's attempts in her youth to get her science fiction works published were unsuccessful. One of her few publications from that time was an unattributed bodice-ripper in True Confessions.

After giving birth to her children in 1996 and 2000, boredom as a stay-at-home mother motivated her to sketch a first draft of what would become Ancillary Justice for National Novel Writing Month 2002. In 2005, Leckie attended the Clarion West Writers Workshop, where she studied under Octavia Butler. After that, she wrote Ancillary Justice over a period of six years; it was picked up by the publisher Orbit in 2012 and published the following year.

Leckie has published numerous short stories, in outlets including Subterranean Magazine, Strange Horizons, and Realms of Fantasy. Her short stories have been selected for inclusion in Year's Best collections, such as The Year's Best Science Fiction & Fantasy, edited by Rich Horton.

She edited the science fiction and fantasy online magazine Giganotosaurus from 2010 to 2013, and is assistant editor of the PodCastle podcast. She served as the secretary of the Science Fiction and Fantasy Writers of America from 2012 to 2013.

=== Imperial Radch trilogy ===
Leckie's debut novel Ancillary Justice, the first book of the Imperial Radch space opera trilogy, was published to critical acclaim in October 2013 and won all of the principal English-language science fiction awards (see Ann Leckie#Awards and nominations). It follows Breq, the sole survivor of a starship destroyed by treachery and vessel of that ship's artificial consciousness, as she attempts to avenge herself on the ruler of her empire.

The sequel, Ancillary Sword, was published in October 2014, and the conclusion, Ancillary Mercy, was published in October 2015. "Night's Slow Poison" (2014) and "She Commands Me and I Obey" (2014) are short stories set in the same universe.

=== Other novels ===
In 2015, Orbit Books purchased two additional novels from Leckie. The first, Provenance (published on 3 October 2017), is set in the Imperial Radch universe. The second was to have been an unrelated science fiction novel. In April 2018, Orbit announced that Leckie's first fantasy novel, The Raven Tower, would be published in early 2019. Another standalone novel set in the Imperial Radch universe entitled Translation State was published on June 6, 2023.

== Bibliography ==
=== Novels ===
==== Set in the Ancillary universe ====
Imperial Radch trilogy

1. Ancillary Justice. (1 October 2013). Orbit. ISBN 978-0-356-50240-3.
2. Ancillary Sword. (7 October 2014). Orbit. ISBN 978-0-356-50241-0.
3. Ancillary Mercy. (6 October 2015). Orbit. ISBN 978-0-356-50242-7.

Other novels

- Provenance. (26 September 2017). Orbit. ISBN 978-0-316-38867-2.
- Translation State. (6 June 2023). Orbit. ISBN 978-0316-28971-9.
- Radiant Star. (12 May 2026). Orbit. ISBN 978-0316290357.

==== Standalone novels ====
- The Raven Tower. (26 February 2019). Orbit. ISBN 978-0316388696.

=== Collections ===
- Lake of Souls: The Collected Short Fiction. (9 Jul 2024). Orbit. ISBN 978-0-356-52346-0.

=== Short fiction ===
- "Hesperia and Glory". (2006). Subterranean Magazine, Issue #4. (Reprinted in Science Fiction: The Best of the Year 2007 Edition, edited by Rich Horton)
- "Footprints". (2007). Postcards from Hell: The First Thirteen.
- "The Snake's Wife". (2007). Helix, Issue #6. (Reprinted on Transcriptase)
- "Needle and Thread" - co-authored by Rachel Swirsky. (2008). Lone Star Stories, Issue #29.
- "The Nalendar". (2008). Andromeda Spaceways Inflight Magazine, Issue #36. (Reprinted in Uncanny Magazine #2, January 2015 and as audio on PodCastle #52, May 2009)
- "Clickweed". (July 2008). A Field Guide to Surreal Botany.
- "Marsh Gods". (7 July 2008). Strange Horizons.
- "The God of Au". Helix, Issue #8. (Reprinted in The Year's Best Science Fiction & Fantasy, 2009, edited by Rich Horton)
- "The Endangered Camp". (2009). Clockwork Phoenix 2. (Reprinted in The Year's Best Science Fiction & Fantasy, 2010, edited by Rich Horton, and Forever Magazine, March 2015)
- "The Sad History of the Tearless Onion" (12 June 2009). PodCastle Miniature, #33.
- "The Unknown God". (February 2010). Realms of Fantasy.
- "Beloved of the Sun". (21 October 2010). Beneath Ceaseless Skies.
- "Maiden, Mother, Crone". (December 2010). Realms of Fantasy. (Reprinted in Lightspeed, January 2015 and as audio on PodCastle #500, 11 December 2017)
- "Saving Bacon". (30 July 2014). PodCastle, #322.
- "The Creation and Destruction of the World" (25 February 2015). PodCastle, #352.
- "Sheep Among Easter Werewolves". (6 October 2015). PodCastle, #384.
- "Another Word for World". (2015). Future Visions: Original Science Fiction Stories Inspired by Microsoft.
- "The Justified". (2019). The Mythic Dream.
- "We Continue" - co-authored by Rachel Swirsky. (2020). In The Book of Dragons, edited by Jonathan Strahan. HarperCollins.
- The Long Game. (2023). Chapbook published by Amazon Original Stories. ISBN 978-1-6625-1567-5. (Reprinted in The Best American Science Fiction and Fantasy 2024, edited by Hugh Howey.)
- "Lake of Souls". (2024). In Lake of Souls. Orbit.
- "Five-Eyed Jane". (2026). In Revolution in the Heart: Stories Inspired by Ursula K. Le Guin, edited by Jonathan Strahan. Titan.

==== Set in the Ancillary universe ====
- "Night's Slow Poison". (2012). Electric Velocipede. (Reprinted by Tor.com in 2014.)
- "She Commands Me and I Obey". (10 November 2014). Strange Horizons.

=== Critical studies and reviews of Leckie's work ===
- Higgins, David M. (29 November 2022). Ann Leckie's Ancillary Justice: A Critical Companion. Palgrave Macmillan. ISBN 978-3031182600.
- Sparks, Cat (February–March 2014). "[Untitled review of Ancillary Justice]". Coda. Reviews. Cosmos. 55: 105.

== Awards and nominations ==
- Ancillary Justice (2013)
  - 2013: Won the Nebula Award for Best Novel
  - 2013: Won the BSFA Award for Best Novel (tie with Ack-Ack Macaque)
  - 2013: Won the Kitschies Award Golden Tentacle (Debut)
  - 2014: Won the Hugo Award for Best Novel
  - 2014: Won the Arthur C. Clarke Award
  - 2014: Won the Locus Award for Best First Novel
  - 2014: Won the British Fantasy Award for the Best Newcomer (the Sydney J. Bounds Award)
  - 2016: Won the Prix Bob-Morane for Best Translated Novel
  - 2016: Won the Seiun Award for Best Translated Novel (Japan)
  - 2013: Honor Listed for the James Tiptree, Jr. Award
  - 2013: Nominated for the Philip K. Dick Award
  - 2014: Finalist for the John W. Campbell Memorial Award for Best Science Fiction Novel
  - 2014: Finalist for the Compton Crook Award
- Ancillary Sword (2014)
  - 2014: Won the BSFA Award for Best Novel
  - 2015: Won the Locus Award for Best Science Fiction Novel
  - 2014: Nominated for the Nebula Award for Best Novel
  - 2015: Finalist for the Hugo Award for Best Novel
- Ancillary Mercy (2015)
  - 2016: Won the Locus Award for Best Science Fiction Novel
  - 2015: Nominated for the Nebula Award for Best Novel
  - 2016: Finalist for the Hugo Award for Best Novel
  - 2016: Nominated for the Dragon Award for Best Science Fiction Novel
- Imperial Radch
  - 2017: Patrick Marcel won Grand Prix de l'Imaginaire for Best Translator (Jacques Chambon Translation Prize) for Les Chroniques du Radch, tomes 1 à 3 (France)
  - 2017: Nominated for Grand Prix de l'Imaginaire for Best Foreign Novel (France)
  - 2017: Nominated for the Seiun Award for Best Translated Novel
  - 2024: Won the Hugo Award for Best Series
- Provenance (2017)
  - 2018: Nominated for the Hugo Award for Best Novel
- Translation State (2023)
  - 2024: Nominated for the Hugo Award for Best Novel
- "Lake of Souls"
  - 2025: Nominated for the Hugo Award for Best Novelette
- Lake of Souls (collection)
  - 2025: Won the Locus Award for Best Collection

== Personal life ==
Leckie was born in Toledo, Ohio, U.S., on March 2, 1966. She grew up in St. Louis, Missouri and earned a degree in music from Washington University in St. Louis in 1989. She has since held various jobs, including as a waitress, a receptionist, a land surveyor, a lunch lady, and a recording engineer. She is married to David Harre, with whom she has a son and daughter, and lives with her family in St. Louis.
