= Ancillary Justice =

2013 science fiction novel by Ann Leckie

- Cover art
- Author: Ann Leckie
- Cover artist: John Harris
- Language: English
- Genre: Science fiction
- Publisher: Orbit Books
- Publication date: 1 October 2013
- Publication place: United States
- Media type: Print (paperback); Ebook; Audiobook (read by Adjoa Andoh)
- Pages: 409
- Awards: Hugo Award for Best Novel (2014); Nebula Award for Best Novel (2014); BSFA Award for Best Novel (2013); Arthur C. Clarke Award (2014); Locus Award for Best First Novel (2014); Kitschies Golden Tentacle for best debut novel (2013); Seiun Award for Best Translated Novel (2016)
- ISBN: 978-0-316-24662-0
- Followed by: Ancillary Sword

Ancillary Justice is a science fiction (SF) novel by the American writer Ann Leckie, published in 2013. It is Leckie's debut novel and the first in her Imperial Radch space opera trilogy, followed by Ancillary Sword (2014) and Ancillary Mercy (2015). The novel follows Breq—who is both the sole survivor of a starship destroyed by treachery and the vessel of that ship's artificial consciousness—as she seeks revenge against the ruler of her civilization.

Ancillary Justice received critical praise and won the Hugo Award, Nebula Award, BSFA Award, Arthur C. Clarke Award, and Locus Award for Best First Novel. It is the only novel to have won the Hugo, Nebula, and Arthur C. Clarke awards.

Three other novels, Provenance (2017), Translation State (2023), and Radiant Star (2026), and two short stories, "Night's Slow Poison" and "She Commands Me and I Obey", are set in the same fictional universe.

== Setting and synopsis ==
Ancillary Justice is a space opera set thousands of years in the future in which the principal power in human space is the expansionist Radch empire. The empire uses spaceships controlled by artificial intelligences (AIs), who control human bodies ("ancillaries") to use as soldiers. The Radchaai do not distinguish people by gender, which Leckie conveys by using "she" pronouns for everybody, and by having the Radchaai main character guess, frequently incorrectly, when she has to use languages with gender-specific pronouns.

The narrative begins nearly twenty years after the disappearance of a Radch starship, the Justice of Toren, when the sole surviving ancillary, Breq, a fragment of the Justice of Toren's consciousness, encounters an officer, Seivarden, who had been a lieutenant on the Justice of Toren 1,000 years earlier. The two are on an ice planet, and Seivarden is in precarious condition. The plot switches between two strands: Breq's "present-day" quest for justice for the Justice of Toren's destruction and flashbacks from 19 years earlier when the Justice of Toren was in orbit around the planet of Shis'urna, which was then being annexed into the empire.

It eventually becomes clear that the Justice of Toren's destruction was the result of a covert war between two opposed strands of consciousness of the Lord of the Radch, Anaander Mianaai, who uses multiple synchronized bodies to rule her far-flung empire. At the novel's end, Breq associates herself with the more peaceful aspect of Anaander Mianaai while waiting for an opportunity to exact her revenge.

== Critical reception ==
The novel received critical acclaim and recognition but also some criticism. Russell Letson's Locus review appreciated the ambitious structure of Leckie's novel, which interweaves several past and present strands of action in a manner reminiscent of Iain M. Banks's Use of Weapons, and its engagement with the tropes of recent space opera as established by Banks, Ursula K. Le Guin, C. J. Cherryh and others. He concluded that "[t]his is not entry-level SF, and its payoff is correspondingly greater because of that."

According to Genevieve Valentine, writing for NPR, the novel is "assured, gripping, and stylish," succeeding both as a tale of an empire and as a character study. Tor.com's Liz Bourke praised Leckie's worldbuilding and her writing as "clear and muscular, with a strong forward impetus, like the best of thriller writing", concluding that Ancillary Justice was "both an immensely fun novel, and a conceptually ambitious one".

Nina Allan's review in Arc was more critical: while she found "nothing lazy, cynical or even particularly commercial-minded" in the novel, she criticized its characterization and considered that its uncritical adoption of space opera tropes and the "disappointingly simple" ideas it conveyed (such as that empires are evil) made Ancillary Justice "an SF novel of the old school: tireless in its recapitulation of genre norms and more or less impenetrable to outsiders".

== Awards ==
Ancillary Justice won the following awards:

- Arthur C. Clarke Award for best science fiction novel of the year, 2014
- British Science Fiction Association BSFA Award for Best Novel
- Hugo Award for Best Novel from the World Science Fiction Society (WSFS), 2014
- Kitschies Golden Tentacle for best debut novel, 2013.
- Locus Award for Best First Novel, 2014
- Nebula Award for Best Novel from the Science Fiction and Fantasy Writers of America, 2013
- Seiun Award for Best Translated Novel, 2016.

The novel was also nominated for the following awards:

- Finalist for the Compton Crook Award for best first science fiction/fantasy/horror novel from the Baltimore Science Fiction Society.
- Named to the James Tiptree Jr. Award Honor List, for science fiction or fantasy that expands or explores our understanding of gender.
- Shortlisted for the Philip K. Dick Award for distinguished original science fiction paperback.

== Television adaptation ==
The novel was optioned for television in October 2014 by the production company Fabrik and Fox Television Studios. Leckie wrote that the producers responded positively to her concerns about how the ungendered, dark-skinned Radchaai characters could be presented in a visual medium. She later wrote that the option had been exercised, but that the project had collapsed in 2024.

== Relevant literature ==
- de Vogel, M. E. "Serious Shenanigans The New Space Opera and Social Commentary: An Analysis of Iain M. Banks's Surface Detail and The Hydrogen Sonata and Ann Leckie's Imperial Radch Trilogy." Utrecht University: Master's thesis, 2018.
- Gibson, Rebecca. In Gibson, Rebecca. “Blood Stays Inside Your Arteries, Dlique”: Aliens, Cyborgs, Death, and Tea Ceremonies in Ann Leckie's Imperial Radch Trilogy. Global Perspectives on the Liminality of the Supernatural, Edited by Rebecca Gibson And James M. Vanderveen. Rowman and Littlefield.
- Töyrylä, Roosa. "“I Might As Well Be Human. But I’m Not.”: Focalization and Narration in Ann Leckie’s Imperial Radch Trilogy." (2020).
- Wright, Wendy L. 2022. Ann Leckie's Ancillary Trilogy and the revolutionary potential of care. In ContactZone : Rivista dell'Associazione Italiana per lo Studio della fantascienza e del Fantastico, ed. by Paolo Loffredo. 1,57-69.
