= The White Giraffe =

2006 novel by Lauren St John

- First edition cover
- Author: Lauren St John
- Original title: The Kudu Clan
- Language: English
- Series: African Adventures
- Subject: Caring about animals
- Genre: Fictional
- Publisher: Orion Children's Books
- Publication date: 1 August 2006
- Publication place: United Kingdom
- Pages: 192
- ISBN: 1-84255-520-0
- Followed by: Dolphin Song

The White Giraffe is a children's novel by Lauren St John first published in 2006. It is the first in the African Adventures series. Lauren St. John picked out a giraffe for the story because she always wanted to ride one. When St. John was a child living in Zimbabwe, Africa, she owned several wild animals including a giraffe. This book was the winner of the 2008 East Sussex Children’s Book Award.

The book is about a girl, Martine, who moves to an African game reserve to live with her grandmother after her parents die in a house fire.
