= Hugo Award for Best Novel =

Annual award for science fiction or fantasy

- Awarded for: Best science fiction or fantasy story of 40,000 words or more published in the prior calendar year
- Presented by: World Science Fiction Society
- First award: 1953
- Most recent winner: Alix E. Harrow (The Everlasting)
- Website: thehugoawards.org

The Hugo Award for Best Novel is one of the Hugo Awards given each year by the World Science Fiction Society for science fiction or fantasy stories published in, or translated to, English during the previous calendar year. The novel award is available for works of fiction of 40,000 words or more; awards are also given out in the short story, novelette, and novella categories. The Hugo Awards have been described as "a fine showcase for speculative fiction", and "the best known literary award for science fiction writing".

The Hugo Award for Best Novel has been awarded annually by the World Science Fiction Society since 1953, except in 1954 and 1957. In addition, between 1996 and 2025, Retrospective Hugo Awards or "Retro-Hugos" were available for works published 50, 75, or 100 years prior. Retro-Hugos could only be awarded for years after 1939 in which no awards were originally given. Retro-Hugo awards were given for novels for 1939, 1941, 1943–1946, 1951, and 1954.

Hugo Award nominees and winners are chosen by supporting or attending members of the annual World Science Fiction Convention, or Worldcon, and the presentation evening constitutes its central event. The final selection process is defined in the World Science Fiction Society Constitution as instant-runoff voting with six finalists, except in the case of a tie. The novels on the ballot are the six most-nominated by members that year, with no limit on the number of stories that can be nominated. The 1953, 1955, and 1958 awards did not include a recognition of runner-up novels, but since 1959 all final candidates have been recorded. Initial nominations are made by members from January through March, while voting on the ballot of six finalists is performed roughly from April through July, subject to change depending on when that year's Worldcon is held. Prior to 2017, the final ballot was five works; it was changed that year to six, with each initial nominator limited to five nominations. Worldcons are generally held in August or early September, and are held in a different city around the world each year.

During the 80 nomination years, 182 authors have had works as finalists and 56 have won (including co-authors, ties, and Retro-Hugos). Two translators have been noted along with the author of a novel written in a language other than English: Ken Liu, in 2015 and 2017, for translations of two works from Chinese; and Rita Barisse, in 2019, who was retroactively noted as the translator of a 1963 French novel. Robert A. Heinlein has won the most Hugos for Best Novel, and also appeared on the most final ballots; he has six wins (four Hugos and two Retro-Hugos) out of twelve finalists. Lois McMaster Bujold has received four Hugos out of ten finalists. Five authors have won three times: Isaac Asimov and Fritz Leiber (with two Hugos and one Retro-Hugo each), N. K. Jemisin, Connie Willis, and Vernor Vinge. Ten other authors have won the award twice. The next-most finalists by a winning author are held by Robert J. Sawyer and Larry Niven, who have been finalists nine and eight times, respectively, and have each only won once. With nine finalist appearance, Robert Silverberg has the greatest number of finalists without winning any. Three authors have won the award in consecutive years: Orson Scott Card (1986 and 1987), Lois McMaster Bujold (1991 and 1992), and N. K. Jemisin (2016, 2017, and 2018).

== Winners and finalists ==
In the following table, the years correspond to the date of the ceremony, rather than when the novel was first published. Each year links to the corresponding "year in literature". Entries with a yellow background have won the award; those with a grey background are the finalists on the short-list.

* Winners and joint winners

Winners and finalists
Year	Author(s)	Novel	Publisher	Ref.
1953	Alfred Bester*	The Demolished Man	Galaxy Science Fiction	
1955	Mark Clifton*	They'd Rather Be Right (also known as The Forever Machine)	Astounding Science-Fiction	
1955	Frank Riley*	They'd Rather Be Right (also known as The Forever Machine)	Astounding Science-Fiction	
1956	Robert A. Heinlein*	Double Star	Astounding Science-Fiction	
1956	Eric Frank Russell	Call Him Dead (also known as Three to Conquer)	Astounding Science-Fiction	
1956	Isaac Asimov	The End of Eternity	Doubleday	
1956	Cyril M. Kornbluth	Not This August	Doubleday	
1956	Leigh Brackett	The Long Tomorrow	Doubleday	
1958 (Note: The 1958 award was officially for "Best Novel or Novelette". It was won by a novel.)	Fritz Leiber*	The Big Time	Galaxy Science Fiction	
1959	James Blish*	A Case of Conscience	Ballantine Books	
1959	Poul Anderson	We Have Fed Our Sea (also known as The Enemy Stars)	Astounding Science-Fiction	
1959	Algis Budrys	Who?	Pyramid Books	
1959	Robert A. Heinlein	Have Space Suit — Will Travel	The Magazine of Fantasy & Science Fiction	
1959	Robert Sheckley	Time Killer (also known as Immortality, Inc.)	Galaxy Science Fiction	
1960	Robert A. Heinlein*	Starship Troopers	The Magazine of Fantasy & Science Fiction	
1960	Gordon R. Dickson	Dorsai! (also known as The Genetic General)	Astounding Science-Fiction	
1960	Murray Leinster	The Pirates of Ersatz (also known as The Pirates of Zan)	Astounding Science-Fiction	
1960	Mark Phillips	That Sweet Little Old Lady (also known as Brain Twister)	Astounding Science-Fiction	
1960	Kurt Vonnegut	The Sirens of Titan	Dell Publishing	
1961	Walter M. Miller, Jr.*	A Canticle for Leibowitz	J. B. Lippincott & Co.	
1961	Poul Anderson	The High Crusade	Astounding Science-Fiction	
1961	Algis Budrys	Rogue Moon	The Magazine of Fantasy & Science Fiction	
1961	Harry Harrison	Deathworld	Astounding Science-Fiction	
1961	Theodore Sturgeon	Venus Plus X	Pyramid Books	
1962	Robert A. Heinlein*	Stranger in a Strange Land	Putnam Publishing Group	
1962	Daniel F. Galouye	Dark Universe	Bantam Books	
1962	Harry Harrison	Planet of the Damned (also known as Sense of Obligation)	Analog Science Fact & Fiction	
1962	Clifford D. Simak	The Fisherman (also known as Time Is the Simplest Thing)	Analog Science Fact & Fiction	
1962	James White	Second Ending	Fantastic	
1963	Philip K. Dick*	The Man in the High Castle	Putnam Publishing Group	
1963	Marion Zimmer Bradley	The Sword of Aldones	Ace Books	
1963	Arthur C. Clarke	A Fall of Moondust	Harcourt Trade Publishers	
1963	H. Beam Piper	Little Fuzzy	Avon Publications	
1963	Jean Bruller (French) (Note: Sylva was the first translated work to appear on the Hugo ballot. The translator was not officially recognized until 2019.)	Sylva	Putnam Publishing Group	
1963	Rita Barisse (translator)	Sylva	Putnam Publishing Group	
1964	Clifford D. Simak*	Here Gather the Stars (also known as Way Station)	Galaxy Science Fiction	
1964	Robert A. Heinlein	Glory Road	The Magazine of Fantasy & Science Fiction	
1964	Andre Norton	Witch World	Ace Books	
1964	Frank Herbert	Dune World (Note: Dune World was the title of the 1964 serialized novel; when "Dune World" and its sequel, "The Prophet of Dune", were incorporated into the 1965 edition of Dune, the book edition was allowed to be nominated in 1966.)	Analog Science Fact & Fiction	
1964	Kurt Vonnegut	Cat's Cradle	Holt, Rinehart and Winston	
1965	Fritz Leiber*	The Wanderer	Ballantine Books	
1965	John Brunner	The Whole Man	Ballantine Books	
1965	Edgar Pangborn	Davy	Ballantine Books	
1965	Cordwainer Smith	The Planet Buyer (also known as The Boy Who Bought Old Earth)	Pyramid Books	
1966	Frank Herbert*	Dune	Chilton Company	
1966	Roger Zelazny*	...And Call Me Conrad (also known as This Immortal)	The Magazine of Fantasy & Science Fiction	
1966	John Brunner	The Squares of the City	Ballantine Books	
1966	Robert A. Heinlein	The Moon Is a Harsh Mistress (Note: The Moon Is a Harsh Mistress was serialized in 1965–66, and was allowed to be nominated for both years.)	If	
1966	Edward E. Smith	Skylark DuQuesne	If	
1967	Robert A. Heinlein*	The Moon Is a Harsh Mistress	If	
1967	Samuel R. Delany	Babel-17	Ace Books	
1967	Randall Garrett	Too Many Magicians	Analog Science Fact & Fiction	
1967	Daniel Keyes	Flowers for Algernon	Harcourt Trade Publishers	
1967	James H. Schmitz	The Witches of Karres	Chilton Company	
1967	Thomas Burnett Swann	Day of the Minotaur	Ace Books	
1968	Roger Zelazny*	Lord of Light	Doubleday	
1968	Samuel R. Delany	The Einstein Intersection	Ace Books	
1968	Piers Anthony	Chthon	Ballantine Books	
1968	Chester Anderson	The Butterfly Kid	Pyramid Books	
1968	Robert Silverberg	Thorns	Ballantine Books	
1969	John Brunner*	Stand on Zanzibar	Doubleday	
1969	Alexei Panshin	Rite of Passage	Ace Books	
1969	Samuel R. Delany	Nova	Doubleday	
1969	R. A. Lafferty	Past Master	Ace Books	
1969	Clifford D. Simak	The Goblin Reservation	Galaxy Science Fiction	
1970	Ursula K. Le Guin*	The Left Hand of Darkness	Ace Books	
1970	Robert Silverberg	Up the Line	Ballantine Books	
1970	Piers Anthony	Macroscope	Avon Publications	
1970	Kurt Vonnegut	Slaughterhouse-Five	Delacorte Press	
1970	Norman Spinrad	Bug Jack Barron	Avon Publications	
1971	Larry Niven*	Ringworld	Ballantine Books	
1971	Poul Anderson	Tau Zero	Doubleday	
1971	Robert Silverberg	Tower of Glass	Charles Scribner's Sons	
1971	Wilson Tucker	The Year of the Quiet Sun	Ace Books	
1971	Hal Clement	Star Light	Analog Science Fact & Fiction	
1972	Philip José Farmer*	To Your Scattered Bodies Go	Putnam Publishing Group	
1972	Ursula K. Le Guin	The Lathe of Heaven	Amazing Stories	
1972	Anne McCaffrey	Dragonquest	Ballantine Books	
1972	Roger Zelazny	Jack of Shadows	The Magazine of Fantasy & Science Fiction	
1972	Robert Silverberg	A Time of Changes	Galaxy Science Fiction	
1973	Isaac Asimov*	The Gods Themselves	Galaxy Science Fiction	
1973	David Gerrold	When HARLIE Was One	Ballantine Books	
1973	Poul Anderson	There Will Be Time	Signet Books	
1973	Robert Silverberg	The Book of Skulls	Charles Scribner's Sons	
1973	Robert Silverberg	Dying Inside	Galaxy Science Fiction	
1973	Clifford D. Simak	A Choice of Gods	Putnam Publishing Group	
1974	Arthur C. Clarke*	Rendezvous with Rama	Galaxy Science Fiction	
1974	Robert A. Heinlein	Time Enough for Love	Putnam Publishing Group	
1974	Larry Niven	Protector	Ballantine Books	
1974	Poul Anderson	The People of the Wind	Analog Science Fact & Fiction	
1974	David Gerrold	The Man Who Folded Himself	Random House	
1975	Ursula K. Le Guin*	The Dispossessed	Harper & Row	
1975	Poul Anderson	Fire Time	Doubleday	
1975	Philip K. Dick	Flow My Tears, the Policeman Said	Doubleday	
1975	Larry Niven	The Mote in God's Eye	Simon & Schuster	
1975	Jerry Pournelle	The Mote in God's Eye	Simon & Schuster	
1975	Christopher Priest	Inverted World	Galaxy Science Fiction	
1976	Joe Haldeman*	The Forever War	St. Martin's Press	
1976	Roger Zelazny	Doorways in the Sand	Analog Science Fact & Fiction	
1976	Larry Niven	Inferno	Galaxy Science Fiction	
1976	Jerry Pournelle	Inferno	Galaxy Science Fiction	
1976	Alfred Bester	The Computer Connection (also known as The Indian Giver)	Berkley Putnam	
1976	Robert Silverberg	The Stochastic Man	Harper & Row	
1977	Kate Wilhelm*	Where Late the Sweet Birds Sang	Harper & Row	
1977	Joe Haldeman	Mindbridge	St. Martin's Press	
1977	Frank Herbert	Children of Dune	Analog Science Fact & Fiction	
1977	Frederik Pohl	Man Plus	The Magazine of Fantasy & Science Fiction	
1977	Robert Silverberg	Shadrach in the Furnace	Analog Science Fact & Fiction	
1978	Frederik Pohl*	Gateway	Galaxy Science Fiction	
1978	Marion Zimmer Bradley	The Forbidden Tower	DAW Books	
1978	Larry Niven	Lucifer's Hammer	Playboy Press	
1978	Jerry Pournelle	Lucifer's Hammer	Playboy Press	
1978	Gordon R. Dickson	Time Storm	St. Martin's Press	
1978	George R. R. Martin	Dying of the Light	Analog Science Fact & Fiction	
1979	Vonda N. McIntyre*	Dreamsnake	Houghton Mifflin	
1979	Anne McCaffrey	The White Dragon	Del Rey Books	
1979	C. J. Cherryh	The Faded Sun: Kesrith	Galaxy Science Fiction	
1979	Tom Reamy	Blind Voices	Berkley Putnam	
1980	Arthur C. Clarke*	The Fountains of Paradise	Victor Gollancz Ltd	
1980	John Varley	Titan	Berkley Putnam	
1980	Frederik Pohl	Jem	St. Martin's Press	
1980	Patricia A. McKillip	Harpist in the Wind	Atheneum Books	
1980	Thomas M. Disch	On Wings of Song	The Magazine of Fantasy & Science Fiction	
1981	Joan D. Vinge*	The Snow Queen	Dial Press	
1981	Robert Silverberg	Lord Valentine's Castle	The Magazine of Fantasy & Science Fiction	
1981	Larry Niven	The Ringworld Engineers	Galileo Magazine of Science & Fiction	
1981	Frederik Pohl	Beyond the Blue Event Horizon	Del Rey Books	
1981	John Varley	Wizard	Berkley Putnam	
1982	C. J. Cherryh*	Downbelow Station	DAW Books	
1982	Gene Wolfe	The Claw of the Conciliator	Timescape Books	
1982	Julian May	The Many-Colored Land	Houghton Mifflin	
1982	Clifford D. Simak	Project Pope	Del Rey Books	
1982	John Crowley	Little, Big	Bantam Books	
1983	Isaac Asimov*	Foundation's Edge	Doubleday	
1983	C. J. Cherryh	The Pride of Chanur	DAW Books	
1983	Arthur C. Clarke	2010: Odyssey Two	Del Rey Books	
1983	Robert A. Heinlein	Friday	Holt, Rinehart and Winston	
1983	Donald Kingsbury	Courtship Rite	Timescape Books	
1983	Gene Wolfe	The Sword of the Lictor	Timescape Books	
1984	David Brin*	Startide Rising	Bantam Books	
1984	R. A. MacAvoy	Tea with the Black Dragon	Bantam Books	
1984	John Varley	Millennium	Berkley Books	
1984	Anne McCaffrey	Moreta: Dragonlady of Pern	Del Rey Books	
1984	Isaac Asimov	The Robots of Dawn	Doubleday	
1985	William Gibson*	Neuromancer	Ace Books	
1985	David R. Palmer	Emergence	Bantam Books	
1985	Vernor Vinge	The Peace War	Bluejay Books	
1985	Robert A. Heinlein	Job: A Comedy of Justice	Del Rey Books	
1985	Larry Niven	The Integral Trees	Del Rey Books	
1986	Orson Scott Card*	Ender's Game	Tor Books	
1986	C. J. Cherryh	Cuckoo's Egg	DAW Books	
1986	David Brin	The Postman	Bantam Spectra	
1986	Larry Niven	Footfall	Del Rey Books	
1986	Jerry Pournelle	Footfall	Del Rey Books	
1986	Greg Bear	Blood Music	Arbor House	
1987	Orson Scott Card*	Speaker for the Dead	Tor Books	
1987	Bob Shaw	The Ragged Astronauts	Victor Gollancz Ltd	
1987	William Gibson	Count Zero	Asimov's Science Fiction	
1987	Vernor Vinge	Marooned in Realtime	Analog Science Fact & Fiction	
1987	L. Ron Hubbard	Black Genesis	Bridge Publications	
1988	David Brin*	The Uplift War	Bantam Spectra	
1988	George Alec Effinger	When Gravity Fails	Arbor House	
1988	Orson Scott Card	Seventh Son	Tor Books	
1988	Greg Bear	The Forge of God	Tor Books	
1988	Gene Wolfe	The Urth of the New Sun	Tor Books	
1989	C. J. Cherryh*	Cyteen	Warner Books	
1989	Orson Scott Card	Red Prophet	Tor Books	
1989	Lois McMaster Bujold	Falling Free	Analog Science Fact & Fiction	
1989	Bruce Sterling	Islands in the Net	Arbor House	
1989	William Gibson	Mona Lisa Overdrive	Victor Gollancz Ltd	
1990	Dan Simmons*	Hyperion	Doubleday	
1990	George Alec Effinger	A Fire in the Sun	Doubleday	
1990	Orson Scott Card	Prentice Alvin	Tor Books	
1990	Poul Anderson	The Boat of a Million Years	Tor Books	
1990	Sheri S. Tepper	Grass	Doubleday	
1991	Lois McMaster Bujold*	The Vor Game	Baen Books	
1991	David Brin	Earth	Bantam Spectra	
1991	Dan Simmons	The Fall of Hyperion	Doubleday	
1991	Michael P. Kube-McDowell	The Quiet Pools	Ace Books	
1991	Greg Bear	Queen of Angels	Warner Questar	
1992	Lois McMaster Bujold*	Barrayar	Analog Science Fact & Fiction	
1992	Emma Bull	Bone Dance	Ace Books	
1992	Anne McCaffrey	All the Weyrs of Pern	Del Rey Books	
1992	Joan D. Vinge	The Summer Queen	Warner Questar	
1992	Orson Scott Card	Xenocide	Tor Books	
1992	Michael Swanwick	Stations of the Tide	Asimov's Science Fiction	
1993	Vernor Vinge*	A Fire Upon the Deep	Tor Books	
1993	Connie Willis*	Doomsday Book	Bantam Spectra	
1993	Kim Stanley Robinson	Red Mars	HarperCollins	
1993	Maureen F. McHugh	China Mountain Zhang	Tor Books	
1993	John Varley	Steel Beach	Ace Books/Putnam Publishing Group	
1994	Kim Stanley Robinson*	Green Mars	HarperCollins	
1994	Greg Bear	Moving Mars	Tor Books	
1994	Nancy Kress	Beggars in Spain	Morrow AvoNova	
1994	David Brin	Glory Season	Bantam Spectra	
1994	William Gibson	Virtual Light	Bantam Spectra	
1995	Lois McMaster Bujold*	Mirror Dance	Baen Books	
1995	John Barnes	Mother of Storms	Tor Books	
1995	Nancy Kress	Beggars and Choosers	Tor Books	
1995	Michael Bishop	Brittle Innings	Bantam Books	
1995	James K. Morrow	Towing Jehovah	Harcourt Brace	
1996	Neal Stephenson*	The Diamond Age	Bantam Spectra	
1996	Stephen Baxter	The Time Ships	HarperPrism	
1996	David Brin	Brightness Reef	Bantam Books	
1996	Robert J. Sawyer	The Terminal Experiment (also known as Hobson's Choice)	Analog Science Fiction and Fact	
1996	Connie Willis	Remake	Bantam Spectra	
1997	Kim Stanley Robinson*	Blue Mars	HarperCollins Voyager	
1997	Lois McMaster Bujold	Memory	Baen Books	
1997	Elizabeth Moon	Remnant Population	Baen Books	
1997	Robert J. Sawyer	Starplex	Analog Science Fiction and Fact	
1997	Bruce Sterling	Holy Fire	Bantam Spectra	
1998	Joe Haldeman*	Forever Peace	Ace Books	
1998	Walter Jon Williams	City on Fire	HarperPrism	
1998	Dan Simmons	The Rise of Endymion	Bantam Spectra	
1998	Robert J. Sawyer	Frameshift	Tor Books	
1998	Michael Swanwick	Jack Faust	Avon Publications	
1999	Connie Willis*	To Say Nothing of the Dog	Bantam Spectra	
1999	Mary Doria Russell	Children of God	Villard Books	
1999	Robert Charles Wilson	Darwinia	Tor Books	
1999	Bruce Sterling	Distraction	Bantam Spectra	
1999	Robert J. Sawyer	Factoring Humanity	Tor Books	
2000	Vernor Vinge*	A Deepness in the Sky	Tor Books	
2000	Lois McMaster Bujold	A Civil Campaign	Baen Books	
2000	Neal Stephenson	Cryptonomicon	Avon Publications	
2000	Greg Bear	Darwin's Radio	HarperCollins	
2000	J. K. Rowling	Harry Potter and the Prisoner of Azkaban	Bloomsbury Publishing	
2001	J. K. Rowling*	Harry Potter and the Goblet of Fire	Bloomsbury Publishing	
2001	George R. R. Martin	A Storm of Swords	HarperCollins Voyager	
2001	Robert J. Sawyer	Calculating God	Tor Books	
2001	Ken MacLeod	The Sky Road	Tor Books	
2001	Nalo Hopkinson	Midnight Robber	Warner Aspect	
2002	Neil Gaiman*	American Gods	William Morrow and Company	
2002	Lois McMaster Bujold	The Curse of Chalion	Eos	
2002	Connie Willis	Passage	Bantam Books	
2002	China Miéville	Perdido Street Station	Macmillan Publishers	
2002	Robert Charles Wilson	The Chronoliths	Tor Books	
2002	Ken MacLeod	Cosmonaut Keep	Orbit Books	
2003	Robert J. Sawyer*	Hominids	Analog Science Fiction and Fact	
2003	David Brin	Kiln People (UK: Kil'n People)	Tor Books	
2003	Michael Swanwick	Bones of the Earth	Eos	
2003	China Miéville	The Scar	Del Rey Books	
2003	Kim Stanley Robinson	The Years of Rice and Salt	Bantam Books	
2004	Lois McMaster Bujold*	Paladin of Souls	Eos	
2004	Dan Simmons	Ilium	Eos	
2004	Charles Stross	Singularity Sky	Ace Books	
2004	Robert Charles Wilson	Blind Lake	Tor Books	
2004	Robert J. Sawyer	Humans	Tor Books	
2005	Susanna Clarke*	Jonathan Strange & Mr Norrell	Bloomsbury Publishing	
2005	Ian McDonald	River of Gods	Simon & Schuster	
2005	Iain M. Banks	The Algebraist	Orbit Books	
2005	Charles Stross	Iron Sunrise	Ace Books	
2005	China Miéville	Iron Council	Del Rey Books	
2006	Robert Charles Wilson*	Spin	Tor Books	
2006	Ken MacLeod	Learning the World	Orbit Books	
2006	George R. R. Martin	A Feast for Crows	Voyager Books	
2006	John Scalzi	Old Man's War	Tor Books	
2006	Charles Stross	Accelerando	Ace Books	
2007	Vernor Vinge*	Rainbows End	Tor Books	
2007	Charles Stross	Glasshouse	Ace Books	
2007	Naomi Novik	His Majesty's Dragon	Voyager Books	
2007	Michael F. Flynn	Eifelheim	Tor Books	
2007	Peter Watts	Blindsight	Tor Books	
2008	Michael Chabon*	The Yiddish Policemen's Union	HarperCollins	
2008	John Scalzi	The Last Colony	Tor Books	
2008	Charles Stross	Halting State	Ace Books	
2008	Robert J. Sawyer	Rollback	Tor Books	
2008	Ian McDonald	Brasyl	Pyr	
2009	Neil Gaiman*	The Graveyard Book	HarperCollins	
2009	Cory Doctorow	Little Brother	Tor Books	
2009	Neal Stephenson	Anathem	Morrow	
2009	Charles Stross	Saturn's Children	Ace Books	
2009	John Scalzi	Zoe's Tale	Tor Books	
2010	Paolo Bacigalupi*	The Windup Girl	Night Shade Books	
2010	China Miéville*	The City & the City	Del Rey Books	
2010	Cherie Priest	Boneshaker	Tor Books	
2010	Robert J. Sawyer	Wake	Ace Books	
2010	Catherynne M. Valente	Palimpsest	Bantam Spectra	
2010	Robert Charles Wilson	Julian Comstock: A Story of 22nd-Century America	Tor Books	
2011	Connie Willis*	Blackout/All Clear	Spectra Books	
2011	Lois McMaster Bujold	Cryoburn	Baen Books	
2011	Ian McDonald	The Dervish House	Gollancz / Pyr	
2011	Mira Grant	Feed	Orbit Books	
2011	N. K. Jemisin	The Hundred Thousand Kingdoms	Orbit Books	
2012	Jo Walton*	Among Others	Tor Books	
2012	George R. R. Martin	A Dance with Dragons	Bantam Spectra	
2012	Mira Grant	Deadline	Orbit Books	
2012	China Miéville	Embassytown	Macmillan Publishers / Del Rey Books	
2012	James S. A. Corey	Leviathan Wakes	Orbit Books	
2013	John Scalzi*	Redshirts	Tor Books	
2013	Kim Stanley Robinson	2312	Orbit Books	
2013	Mira Grant	Blackout	Orbit Books	
2013	Lois McMaster Bujold	Captain Vorpatril's Alliance	Baen Books	
2013	Saladin Ahmed	Throne of the Crescent Moon	DAW Books	
2014	Ann Leckie*	Ancillary Justice	Orbit Books	
2014	Charles Stross	Neptune's Brood	Ace Books	
2014	Mira Grant	Parasite	Orbit Books	
2014	Larry Correia	Warbound	Baen Books	
2014	Robert Jordan	The Wheel of Time (Note: The entire The Wheel of Time series of novels was nominated as a whole under an interpretation of the rules, confirmed by the World Science Fiction Society, which permit multi-part works to be nominated as long as no individual part (or book) had ever been on the shortlist.)	Tor Books	
2014	Brandon Sanderson	The Wheel of Time	Tor Books	
2015 (Note: Lines of Departure by Marko Kloos was initially nominated for Best Novel in 2015, but was withdrawn by the author after the nominees were announced in protest for being promoted by the Sad Puppies and Rabid Puppies nomination slates, the first time a nominee was withdrawn after announcement. It was replaced on the ballot by The Three-Body Problem by Cixin Liu, the eventual winner.)	Cixin Liu (Chinese)* (Note: Cixin Liu's 2015 winner The Three-Body Problem and 2017 nominee Death's End are the only novels for which both the author and the translator (Ken Liu) were officially recognized during the awards process)	The Three-Body Problem	Chongqing Press (original); Tor Books (translation)	
2015	Ken Liu (translator)*	The Three-Body Problem	Chongqing Press (original); Tor Books (translation)	
2015	Katherine Addison	The Goblin Emperor	Tor Books	
2015	Kevin J. Anderson	The Dark Between the Stars	Tor Books	
2015	Jim Butcher	Skin Game	Roc Books	
2015	Ann Leckie	Ancillary Sword	Orbit Books	
2016	N. K. Jemisin*	The Fifth Season	Orbit Books	
2016	Naomi Novik	Uprooted	Del Rey Books	
2016	Ann Leckie	Ancillary Mercy	Orbit Books	
2016	Neal Stephenson	Seveneves	William Morrow and Company	
2016	Jim Butcher	The Cinder Spires: The Aeronaut's Windlass	Roc Books	
2017	N. K. Jemisin*	The Obelisk Gate	Orbit Books	
2017	Charlie Jane Anders	All the Birds in the Sky	Tor Books	
2017	Becky Chambers	A Closed and Common Orbit	Hodder & Stoughton	
2017	Cixin Liu (Chinese)	Death's End	Chongqing Press (original); Tor Books (translation)	
2017	Ken Liu (translator)	Death's End	Chongqing Press (original); Tor Books (translation)	
2017	Yoon Ha Lee	Ninefox Gambit	Solaris Books	
2017	Ada Palmer	Too Like the Lightning	Tor Books	
2018	N. K. Jemisin*	The Stone Sky	Orbit Books	
2018	John Scalzi	The Collapsing Empire	Tor Books	
2018	Kim Stanley Robinson	New York 2140	Orbit Books	
2018	Ann Leckie	Provenance	Orbit Books	
2018	Yoon Ha Lee	Raven Stratagem	Solaris Books	
2018	Mur Lafferty	Six Wakes	Orbit Books	
2019	Mary Robinette Kowal*	The Calculating Stars	Tor Books	
2019	Becky Chambers	Record of a Spaceborn Few	Hodder & Stoughton	
2019	Yoon Ha Lee	Revenant Gun	Solaris Books	
2019	Naomi Novik	Spinning Silver	Del Rey Books	
2019	Rebecca Roanhorse	Trail of Lightning	Saga Press	
2019	Catherynne M. Valente	Space Opera	Saga Press	
2020	Arkady Martine*	A Memory Called Empire	Tor Books	
2020	Charlie Jane Anders	The City in the Middle of the Night	Tor Books	
2020	Tamsyn Muir	Gideon the Ninth	Tor.com Publishing	
2020	Kameron Hurley	The Light Brigade	Saga Press	
2020	Seanan McGuire	Middlegame	Tor.com Publishing	
2020	Alix E. Harrow	The Ten Thousand Doors of January	Redhook	
2021	Martha Wells*	Network Effect	Tor.com Publishing	
2021	Rebecca Roanhorse	Black Sun	Saga Press	
2021	N. K. Jemisin	The City We Became	Orbit Books	
2021	Tamsyn Muir	Harrow the Ninth	Tor.com Publishing	
2021	Susanna Clarke	Piranesi	Bloomsbury Publishing	
2021	Mary Robinette Kowal	The Relentless Moon	Tor Books	
2022	Arkady Martine*	A Desolation Called Peace	Tor Books	
2022	Becky Chambers	The Galaxy, and the Ground Within	Harper Voyager/Hodder & Stoughton	
2022	Ryka Aoki	Light From Uncommon Stars	Tor Books/St. Martin's Press	
2022	P. Djèlí Clark	A Master of Djinn	Tordotcom/Orbit UK	
2022	Andy Weir	Project Hail Mary	Ballantine Books/Del Rey Books	
2022	Shelley Parker-Chan	She Who Became the Sun	Tor Books/Mantle Books	
2023 (Note: Voting statistics for the 2023 Hugo Awards from the 81st World Science Fiction Convention, which was held in Chengdu, China, later came into question due to the multiple works and people declared ineligible without explanation.)	Ursula Vernon (as T. Kingfisher)*	Nettle & Bone	Tor Books	
2023	John Scalzi	The Kaiju Preservation Society	Tor Books	
2023	Travis Baldree	Legends & Lattes	Tor Books	
2023	Tamsyn Muir	Nona the Ninth	Tordotcom	
2023	Silvia Moreno-Garcia	The Daughter of Doctor Moreau	Del Rey Books	
2023	Mary Robinette Kowal	The Spare Man	Tor Books	
2024	Emily Tesh*	Some Desperate Glory	Tordotcom/Orbit Books	
2024	Shannon Chakraborty	The Adventures of Amina al-Sirafi	Harper Voyager	
2024	Vajra Chandrasekera	The Saint of Bright Doors	Tordotcom	
2024	John Scalzi	Starter Villain	Tor Books	
2024	Ann Leckie	Translation State	Orbit Books	
2024	Martha Wells	Witch King	Tordotcom	
2025	Robert Jackson Bennett*	The Tainted Cup	Del Rey Books/Hodderscape	
2025	Adrian Tchaikovsky	Alien Clay	Orbit Books/Tor UK	
2025	Kaliane Bradley	The Ministry of Time	Avid Reader Press/Sceptre	
2025	Adrian Tchaikovsky	Service Model	Tordotcom	
2025	John Wiswell	Someone You Can Build a Nest In	DAW Books	
2025	Ursula Vernon (as T. Kingfisher)	A Sorceress Comes to Call	Tor Books	
2026	Alix E. Harrow*	The Everlasting	Tor Books	
2026	Robert Jackson Bennett	A Drop of Corruption	Del Rey Books/Hodderscape	
2026	Nnedi Okorafor	Death of the Author	William Morrow/Victor Gollancz Ltd	
2026	Adrian Tchaikovsky	Shroud	Tor Books	
2026	Emily Tesh	The Incandescent	Tor Books/Orbit Books	
2026	Antonia Hodgson	The Raven Scholar	Orbit Books/Hodderscape	

=== Retro-Hugos ===
Between the 1996 Worldcon and 2025 Worldcon, the World Science Fiction Society had the concept of "Retro-Hugos", in which the Hugo award could be retroactively awarded for 50, 75, or 100 years prior. Retro-Hugos could only be awarded for years after 1939 (the year of the first Worldcon) in which no Hugos were originally awarded. Retro-Hugos were awarded eight times, for 1939, 1941, 1943–46, 1951, and 1954.

Retro Hugo winners and nominees
Year	Year awarded	Author(s)	Novel	Publisher or publication	Ref.
1939	2014	T. H. White*	The Sword in the Stone	William Collins, Sons	
1939	2014	Edgar Rice Burroughs	Carson of Venus	Argosy	
1939	2014	E. E. Smith	Galactic Patrol	Astounding Stories	
1939	2014	Jack Williamson	The Legion of Time	Astounding Science-Fiction	
1939	2014	C. S. Lewis	Out of the Silent Planet	The Bodley Head	
1941	2016	A. E. van Vogt*	Slan	Astounding Science Fiction	
1941	2016	E. E. Smith	Gray Lensman	Astounding Science Fiction	
1941	2016	T. H. White	The Ill-Made Knight	William Collins, Sons	
1941	2016	Karin Boye	Kallocain	Bonniers	
1941	2016	Jack Williamson	The Reign of Wizardry	Unknown	
1943	2018	Robert A. Heinlein (as Anson MacDonald)*	Beyond This Horizon	Astounding Science Fiction	
1943	2018	Olaf Stapledon	Darkness and the Light	Methuen Publishing	
1943	2018	Curt Siodmak	Donovan's Brain	Black Mask	
1943	2018	Austin Tappan Wright	Islandia	Farrar & Rinehart	
1943	2018	E. E. Smith	Second Stage Lensmen	Astounding Science Fiction	
1943	2018	Dorothy Macardle	The Uninvited	Doubleday	
1944	2019	Fritz Leiber*	Conjure Wife	Unknown Worlds	
1944	2019	C. L. Moore	Earth's Last Citadel	Argosy	
1944	2019	Henry Kuttner	Earth's Last Citadel	Argosy	
1944	2019	Fritz Leiber	Gather, Darkness!	Astounding Science-Fiction	
1944	2019	Hermann Hesse	Das Glasperlenspiel (The Glass Bead Game)	Fretz & Wasmuth	
1944	2019	C. S. Lewis	Perelandra	John Lane, The Bodley Head	
1944	2019	A. E. van Vogt	The Weapon Makers	Astounding Science-Fiction	
1945	2020	Leigh Brackett*	"Shadow Over Mars" (The Nemesis from Terra)	Startling Stories	
1945	2020	Robert Graves	The Golden Fleece	Cassell	
1945	2020	Edgar Rice Burroughs	Land of Terror	Edgar Rice Burroughs, Inc.	
1945	2020	Olaf Stapledon	Sirius: A Fantasy of Love and Discord	Secker & Warburg	
1945	2020	Eric Linklater	The Wind on the Moon	Macmillan Publishers	
1945	2020	A. E. van Vogt	"The Winged Man"	Astounding Science-Fiction	
1945	2020	Edna Mayne Hull	"The Winged Man"	Astounding Science-Fiction	
1946	1996	Isaac Asimov*	The Mule	Astounding Science-Fiction	
1946	1996	A. E. van Vogt	The World of Null-A	Astounding Science-Fiction	
1946	1996	C. S. Lewis	That Hideous Strength (also known as The Tortured Planet)	John Lane	
1946	1996	Fritz Leiber	Destiny Times Three	Astounding Science-Fiction	
1946	1996	Edmond Hamilton (as Brett Sterling)	Red Sun of Danger (also known as Danger Planet)	Startling Stories	
1951	2001	Robert A. Heinlein*	Farmer in the Sky	Boys' Life	
1951	2001	Isaac Asimov	Pebble in the Sky	Doubleday	
1951	2001	C. S. Lewis	The Lion, the Witch and the Wardrobe	Geoffrey Bles	
1951	2001	E. E. Smith	First Lensman	Fantasy Press	
1951	2001	Jack Vance	The Dying Earth	Hillman Periodicals	
1954	2004	Ray Bradbury*	Fahrenheit 451	Ballantine Books	
1954	2004	Arthur C. Clarke	Childhood's End	Ballantine Books	
1954	2004	Hal Clement	Mission of Gravity	Astounding Science-Fiction	
1954	2004	Isaac Asimov	The Caves of Steel	Galaxy Science Fiction	
1954	2004	Theodore Sturgeon	More Than Human	Farrar, Straus and Giroux	

== Authors with multiple wins ==
4 wins

- Robert A. Heinlein
- Lois McMaster Bujold

3 wins

- Vernor Vinge
- Connie Willis
- N. K. Jemisin

2 wins

- Fritz Leiber
- Roger Zelazny
- Ursula K. Le Guin
- Arthur C. Clarke
- Isaac Asimov
- Orson Scott Card
- David Brin
- C. J. Cherryh
- Kim Stanley Robinson
- Joe Haldeman
- Neil Gaiman
- Arkady Martine

== Authors with multiple nominations ==
10 nominations

- Robert A. Heinlein
- Lois McMaster Bujold

9 nominations

- Robert Silverberg
- Robert J. Sawyer

8 nominations

- Larry Niven

7 nominations

- Poul Anderson
- David Brin
- Charles Stross
- John Scalzi

6 nominations

- Orson Scott Card
- Kim Stanley Robinson

5 nominations

- Clifford D. Simak
- C. J. Cherryh
- Greg Bear
- Vernor Vinge
- Connie Willis
- China Miéville
- N. K. Jemisin
- Ann Leckie
- Robert Charles Wilson
- Seanan McGuire (Note: Four of these under her pen name Mira Grant)

4 nominations

- Roger Zelazny
- Frederik Pohl
- Arthur C. Clarke
- Isaac Asimov
- Jerry Pournelle
- Anne McCaffrey
- John Varley
- William Gibson
- Dan Simmons
- George R. R. Martin
- Neal Stephenson

3 nominations

- John Brunner
- Samuel R. Delany
- Kurt Vonnegut
- Ursula K. Le Guin
- Frank Herbert
- Gene Wolfe
- Joe Haldeman
- Bruce Sterling
- Michael Swanwick
- Ken MacLeod
- Ian McDonald
- Naomi Novik
- Yoon Ha Lee
- Becky Chambers
- Mary Robinette Kowal
- Tamsyn Muir
- Adrian Tchaikovsky

== See also ==
- Nebula Award for Best Novel
- List of joint winners of the Hugo and Nebula awards
- List of literary awards
- Locus Award for Best Novel
