= Caroline Rowland (filmmaker) =

- Born: 13 May 1968 (age 58)
- Education: Rhodes University
- Occupations: Producer, Entrepreneur
- Known for: The Official Film of the London 2012 Olympic Games

Caroline Rowland (born 13 May 1968) is a British producer, director, strategic business advisor, and entrepreneur. She is the founder of New Moon Television and Egoli Media.

== Early life and education ==
Rowland attended St. Agnes High School in Welkom. She graduated from Rhodes University in English and Journalism in 1989.

== Career ==
Rowland started her career by working as an Account Director at J. Thompson in 1993. In 1996, she founded New Moon Television Limited, and her company produced two films Sport at Heart and Inspiration for the London bid for Summer Olympics in 2012, and have since earned 26 awards between them. Rowland's directorial debut, FIRST: The Official Film of the London 2012 Olympic Games, was nominated for a 2014 Emmy and was awarded "Best Documentary: Feature at the Moondance Film Festival.

Rowland's production credits include the film Belief for the Beijing 2008 Summer Olympics, the films for Sochi's successful bid to host the 2014 Winter Olympics the films for the successful Qatar 2022 FIFA World Cup bid, and the films for PyeongChang's successful bid to host the 2018 Winter Olympics.

== Filmography ==
Rowland has produced multiple films. She has produced a reinterpretation of W. H. Auden’s Night Mail for the royal opening of St. Pancras railway station.

Films/Documentaries
S.No.	Name of the film/documentaries	Year
1	Sport at Heart	2005
2	Florida Fatbusters	2006
3	Festival of Taste	2006
4	Vision Beijing: Belief	2008
5	We Are the People We’ve Been Waiting For	2009
6	First	2012
7	Legends Live On	2016
8	SEVE Artist Fighter Legend	2022

== Awards ==
In 2011, Rowland received the South African Business Club Woman in Business of the Year award. She has been regarded as one of the Influential People in the Bid for the London 2012 Olympics by The Observer. In 2016, Rowland received the Distinguished Rhodian Award from Rhodes University. In 2019, she was inducted into the Fédération Internationale Cinéma Télévision Sportifs (FICTS) Hall of Fame.
