= Natasha Cooper =

English crime fiction writer

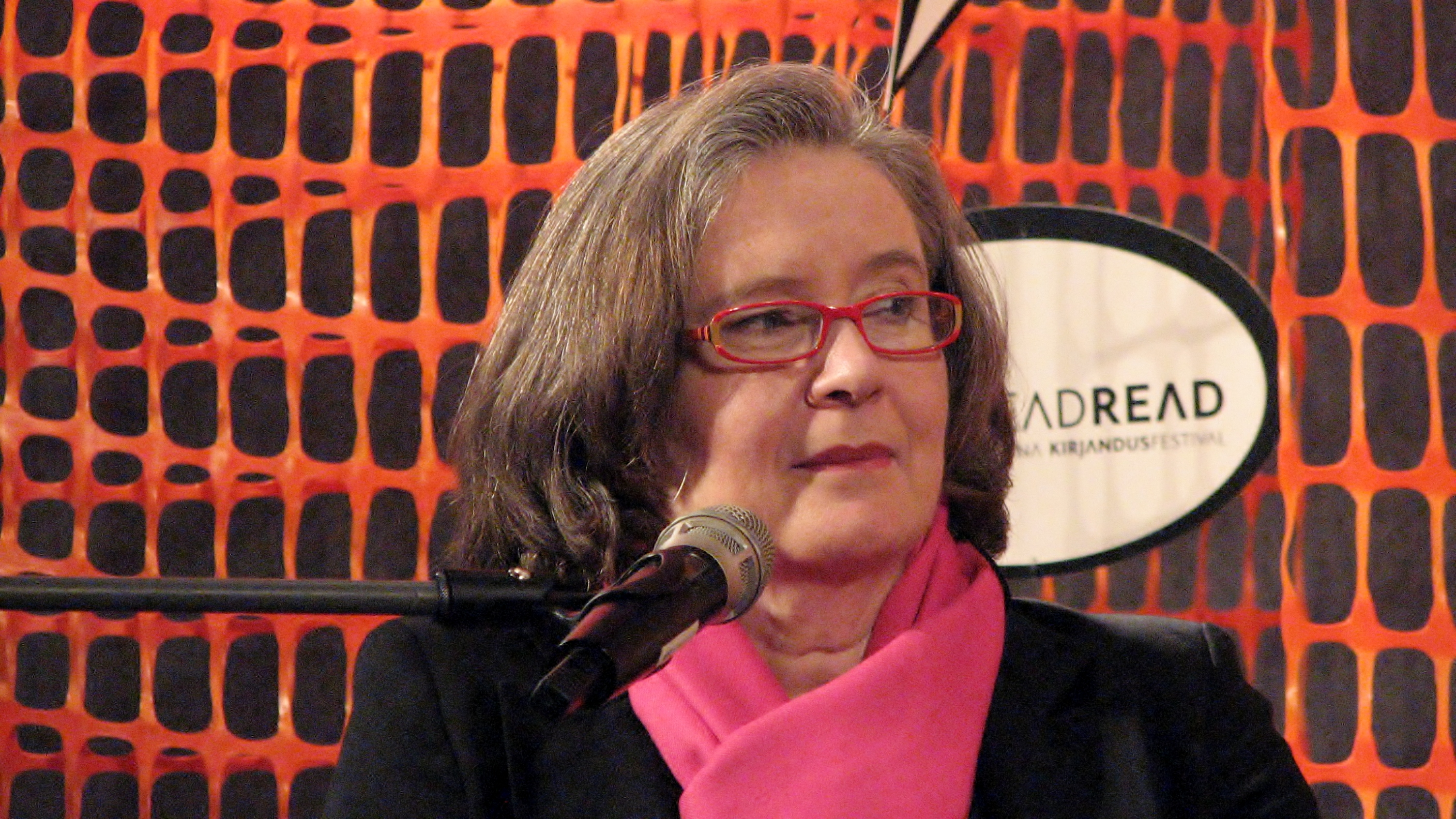
Natasha Cooper performing in HeadRead festival

Natasha J. Cooper (born 1951 in Kensington, London) is an English crime fiction writer.

== Biography ==
Cooper is the second of five children. She was born into a family of academics. Since childhood Cooper dreamed of becoming a writer. But due to her dyslexia this seemed impossible. Nevertheless, her grandmother, Catherine Wright, encouraged her to try making her dream come true.

After her formal education she started working in publishing. As a young editor she won the Tony Godwin Memorial Trust Award. After ten years in publishing Cooper decided to begin writing herself. She started with historical novels using a pen name. While working on her first series about the civil servant and romantic novelist Willow King, Cooper discovered her favored genre: crime fiction. Cooper wrote her second series about a fictional barrister named Trish Maguire. Trish has a sensitive social conscience and is always meddling in affairs outside her professional scope. Cooper's third series focuses on the character Karen Taylor, a forensic psychologist. the fourth in this series, Vengeance in Mind, was shortlisted for the CWA Gold Dagger.

Additionally Cooper writes book reviews for the Times, the Times Literary Supplement, and the Globe and Mail. She also has a column in Crime Time. In 2007 she chaired the Harrogate Crime Writing festival.

== Bibliography ==
=== Aliases ===
- as Daphne Wright
  - Distant Kingdom (1987)
  - The Longest Winter (1989)
  - Parrot Cage (1990)
  - Never Such Innocence (1991)
  - Dreams of Another Day (1992)
  - The Tightrope Walkers (1993)
- as Kate Hatfield
  - Drowning in Honey (1995)
  - Angels Alone (1996)
  - Marsh Light (1997)
- as Clare Layton
  - Those Whom the Gods Love (2001)
  - Clutch of Phantoms (2007)

=== Willow King ===
- Festering Lilies (1990)
- Poison Flowers (1991)
- Bloody Roses (1992)
- Bitter Herbs (1994)
- Rotten Apples (1995)
- Fruiting Bodies (1996)
- Sour Grapes (1997)

=== Trish Maguire ===
- Creeping Ivy (1998)
- Fault Lines (1999)
- Prey to All (2000)
- Out of the Dark (2002)
- A Place of Safety (2003)
- Keep Me Alive (2004)
- Gagged and Bound (2005)
- A Greater Evil (2007)
- A Poisoned Mind (2008)

=== Karen Taylor ===
- No Escape (2009)
- Life Blood (2010)
- Face of the Devil (2011)
- Vengeance in Mind (2012)

=== More books ===
- No More Victims (2008)

== Sources ==
- Natasha Cooper (2007). "about Natasha".
- "Natasha Cooper". Euro Crime. 21 June 2009. Archived from the original on 1 October 2011.
- "Cooper, Natasha". Gregory & Company.
