= Provenance (novel) =

2017 science fiction novel by Ann Leckie

- First edition cover
- Author: Ann Leckie
- Cover artist: John Harris
- Language: English
- Genre: Science fiction
- Publisher: Orbit Books
- Publication date: September 26, 2017
- Publication place: USA
- Media type: Print; ebook
- Pages: 448
- ISBN: 978-0316388672 Hardcover

Provenance is a 2017 science fiction novel by Ann Leckie. Although it is set in the same universe as her 2013 Ancillary Justice and its sequels, it is not itself a sequel. It is published by Orbit Books.

== Plot summary ==
The bulk of the story is set on the human world of Hwae and its space station. Hwae is an independent system, but its convenient wormhole gates making it a strategically valuable target to the nearby Omkem Federacy and Tyr Siilas systems.

Ingray Aughskold is the adopted daughter of Netano Aughskold, a politically influential figure on Hwae. She and her brother Danach compete to be named Netano’s heir. To prove her worth, Ingray devises a bold plan: she spends her savings to rescue Pahlad Budrakim from a high-security prison on Tyr. Pahlad was arrested for the theft of eir (Note: Pahlad is a neman, a third gender in Hwaen society. Pahlad’s pronouns are e/em/eirs) family’s “vestiges”. These artifacts are highly valued in Hwae society for their cultural and historical significance. Ingray hopes to recover these vestiges and use them to enhance her political standing. Pahlad assumes the false identity Garal Ket.

Captain Tic Uisine, Ingray’s ride off Tyr Siilas, is detained due to diplomatic pressure from the alien Geck. Uisine is from the Geck homeworld, but wishes to renounce his Geck citizenship and legally identify as human. Uisine angers the Geck ambassador but is released.

The group returns to Hwae. Police officers arrest Garal for the murder of Excellency Zat, an Omkem Federacy politician. However, evidence soon reveals that Zat was murdered by Hevom, another Omkem citizen. The Omkem government wishes to pin the murder on Garal for political reasons.

Garal reveals that the Budrakim family’s vestiges were all fake; in fact, many vestiges on Hwae are forgeries, a fact that is well-known in other human systems. When Pahlad discovered this and tried to reveal the truth, eir father concocted the lie about the vestiges being stolen and had em imprisoned.

Captain Uisine impersonates the Geck ambassador and asks for Garal to be released into Geck custody. The real ambassador agrees to accept Garal as a Geck citizen. Simultaneously, Hwae arrests Hevom for murdering Zat.

The Omkem Federacy launches an attack on Hwae Station. Netano Aughskold is captured. Ingray exchanges herself for her mother and several other prisoners. With the assistance of Tic Uisine, Ingray sabotages her captors’ attempts to steal vestiges. Ingray is portrayed as a hero by local media. She declines an offer to become her mother’s heir and decides to return home to focus on her own goals, which include reforming the prison system which once held Garal.

== Reception ==
Kirkus Reviews praised the book as "more Leckie to love", and described its theme as "what binds children to their families", while noting that the title "Provenance" has multiple meanings – not only the provenance of antiquities, but also the question of "where people come from and how it made them what they are". Publishers Weekly lauded its "charm and wit", but faulted it for not "quite hav(ing) the depth and richness Leckie fans might expect".

At the Guardian, Adam Roberts considered the novel to be "intricately, if linearly and rather shallowly, plotted", with Ingray being a "likeable heroine, but not a terribly remarkable one", while at National Public Radio, Genevieve Valentine described it as a cozy mystery that "makes (...) a fitting addition to the Ancillary world" (while conceding that Provenance's characters "do not possess the immediate power of Breq", the protagonist of the Ancillary novels).

James Nicoll observed that the plot is largely driven by "angling for advantage in the next election", and compared it to the works of C. J. Cherryh (albeit with "more transparent" prose and a protagonist who was "not chronically sleep-deprived"), and correctly predicted that it would be a nominee for the 2018 Hugo Award for Best Novel.
