= Christine Feehan bibliography =

This bibliography contains is a list of works from American author Christine Feehan.

== The Carpathian novels ==
This series tells the stories of the Carpathians, an ancient race with near-immortal lifespans that feeds on human blood, but the Carpathians are nearing extinction due to a scarcity of females to mate with. With their lifemates, male Carpathians live emotion-filled colorful lives. Without them, the males fight the madness that causes them to choose between suicide or the thrill of killing humans by draining their blood, becoming soulless vampires in the process. Learning that special human women can possibly become lifemates, the Carpathians realize there may be hope of saving their species from extinction.

Book #	Title	Publication date	Lifemates	New York Times best sellers lists
1	Dark Prince	August 1, 1999	Mikhail Dubrinsky & Raven Whitney	Hardcover Fiction
2	Dark Desire	December 1, 1999	Jacques Dubrinsky & Shea O'Halloran	--
3	Dark Gold	April 1, 2000	Aidan Savage & Alexandria Houton	--
4	Dark Magic	July 1, 2000	Gregori Daratrazanoff & Savannah Dubrinsky	--
5	Dark Challenge	November 1, 2000	Julian Savage & Desari Daratrazanoff	--
6	Dark Fire	August 14, 2001	Darius Daratrazanoff & Tempest Trine; Barack & Syndil	--
7	Dark Dream	September 1, 2001	Falcon & Sara Marten	--
8	Dark Legend	January 1, 2002	Gabriel Daratrazanoff & Francesca Del Ponce	--
9	Dark Guardian	May 1, 2002	Lucian Daratrazanoff & Jaxon Montgomery	--
10	Dark Symphony	March 1, 2003	Byron Justicano & Antonietta Scarletti	Paperback Fiction
11	Dark Descent	November 1, 2003	Traian Trigovise & Joie Sanders	--
12	Dark Melody	November 1, 2003	Dayan & Corrine Wentworth	Paperback Fiction
13	Dark Destiny	July 1, 2004	Nicolae Von Shrieder & Destiny	Paperback Fiction
14	Dark Hunger	August 31, 2004	Riordan De La Cruz & Juliette Sangria	--
15	Dark Secret	February 1, 2005	Rafael De La Cruz & Colby Jansen	Paperback Fiction
16	Dark Demon	April 1, 2006	Vikirnoff Von Shrieder & Natalya Shonski	Paperback Fiction
17	Dark Celebration	August 1, 2006	--	Paperback Fiction
18	Dark Possession	August 28, 2007	Manolito De La Cruz & MaryAnn Delaney	Paperback Mass Market Fiction
19	Dark Curse	September 2, 2008	Nicolas De La Cruz & Lara Callidine	Best Sellers: Fiction
20	Dark Slayer	September 1, 2009	Ivory Malinov & Razvan Shonski	Best Sellers: Fiction
21	Dark Peril	September 31, 2010	Dominic Dragonseeker & Solange Sangria	Best Sellers: Fiction
22	Dark Predator	September 6, 2011	Zacarias De La Cruz & Marguarita Fernandez	Best Sellers: Fiction
23	Dark Storm	October 2, 2012	Danutdaxton (Dax) & Riley Parker	--
24	Dark Lycan	September 3, 2013	Fenris Dalka & Tatijana Dragonseeker	--
25	Dark Wolf	January 7, 2014	Dimitri Tirunul & Skyler Daratrazanoff	Hardback Fiction
26	Dark Blood	September 2, 2014	Zev Hunter & Branislava Dragonseeker	--
27	Dark Crime	August 4, 2015	Maksim Volkov & Blaze McGuire	--
28	Dark Ghost	September 1, 2015	Andre Boroi & Teagan Joanes	--
29	Dark Promises	March 15, 2016	Gabrielle Sanders & Aleksei; Trixie Joanes & Fane	--
30	Dark Carousel	August 2, 2016	Tariq Asenguard & Charlotte Vintage	--
31	Dark Legacy	September 5, 2017	Dragomir Koziel & Emeline Sanchez	--
32	Dark Sentinel	September 4, 2018	Andor Katona & Lorraine Peters	--
33	Dark Illusion	September 3, 2019	Isai Florea & Julija Brennan	#3 Combined Print & E-Book Fiction
34	Dark Song	September 1, 2020	Ferro Arany & Elisabeta Trigovise	#3 Combined Print & E-Book Fiction
35	Dark Tarot	November 9, 2021	Sandu Berdardi & Adalasi Ravasio	--
36	Dark Whisper	October 11, 2022	Afanasiv "Siv" Balan & Vasilisa Sidkorolyavolkva	--
37	Dark Memory	October 3, 2023	Petru Cioban & Safia Meziane	--
38	Dark Hope	January 7, 2025	Benedek Kovak & Silke Vriese Reinders	--

== Sea Haven novels ==
These novels take place in (or the vicinity of) the town of Sea Haven. Each book is included in one of the three series forming this collection: the Drake Sisters, the Sisters of the Heart, and Torpedo Ink.

=== The Drake Sisters ===
The first series, Drake Sisters, focuses on the seven Drakes sisters, discovering their magical powers and finding the men they are destined to be with.

Book #	Title	Publication date	Couple	New York Times best sellers list
1	Magic in the Wind	October 2003	Sarah Drake & Damon Wilder	--
2	The Twilight Before Christmas	December 2003	Kate Drake & Matt Granite	--
3	Oceans of Fire	April 2005	Abigail Drake & Aleksandr Volstov	Paperback Best Sellers
4	Dangerous Tides	June 2006	Libby Drake & Tyson Derrick	Paperback Best Sellers
5	Safe Harbor	June 2007	Hannah Drake & Jonas Harrington	Paperback Best Sellers
6	Turbulent Sea	July 2008	Joley Drake & Ilya Prakenskii	Paperback Best Sellers: Mass Market Fiction
7	Hidden Currents	June 2009	Elle Drake & Jackson Deveau	Paperback Best Sellers: Mass Market Fiction

=== Sisters of the Heart ===
In the second Sea Haven series, six women meet after each is the victim of a violent crime. In the process of working through their grief, they form a sisterhood, learning to love and trust each other. Each novel is about one of the women and her chosen man, one of the Prakenskii brothers.

Book #	Title	Publication date	Couple	New York Times best sellers list
1	Water Bound	July 2010	Rikki Sitmore & Lev Prakenskii	Paperback Best Sellers: Fiction: Mass-Market
2	Spirit Bound	December 2011	Judith Henderson & Stefan Prakenskii	Best Sellers: Hardcover and Paperback Fiction
3	Air Bound	May 2014	Airiana Ridell & Maxim Prakenskii	--
4	Earth Bound	June 2015	Lexi Thompson & Gavriil Prakenskii	--
5	Fire Bound	April 2016	Lissa Piner & Casimir Prakenskii	--
6	Bound Together	March 2017	Blythe Daniels & Viktor "Czar" Prakenskii	--

=== Torpedo Ink ===
The third series focuses on the Torpedo Ink motorcycle club, led by Viktor Prakenskii, which was introduced in Bound Together.

Book #	Title	Publication date	Couple	New York Times best sellers list
1	Judgment Road	January 2018	Savva "Reaper" Pajari & Anya Rafferty	#1 NYT
2	Vengeance Road	January 2019	Lyov "Steele" Russak & Breezy Simmons	#2 NYT
3	Vendetta Road	January 2020	Isaak "Ice" Koval & Soleil Brodeur	#2 NYT combined list
4	Desolation Road	June 2020	Aleksei "Absinthe" Solokov & Scarlet Foley	--
5	Reckless Road	February 2021	Gedeon "Player" Lazaroff & Zyah Gamal	--
6	Annihilation Road	December 28, 2021	Savin "Savage" Pajari & Seychelle Dubois	--
7	Savage Road	January 25, 2022	Savin "Savage" Pajari & Seychelle Dubois	--
8	Recovery Road	January 31, 2023	Kir "Master" Vasiliev & Ambrielle Moore	--
9	Betrayal Road	August 20, 2024	Andrii "Maestro" Federoff and Azelie Vargas	--

== Ghostwalkers novels ==
The Ghostwalker novels revolve around an elite squadron of men and women who, through secret experimentation, can be transformed into extraordinary weapons.

Book	Title	Publication date	Couple	New York Times best seller
1	Shadow Game	August 26, 2003	Ryland "King" Miller & Lily Whitney	--
2	Mind Game	July 27, 2004	Nicolas "Nico" Trevane & Dahlia Le Blanc	Paperback Best Sellers
3	Night Game	November 1, 2005	Raoul "Gator" Fontenot & Iris "Flame" Johnson	--
4	Conspiracy Game	October 31, 2006	Jack Norton & Briony "Bri" Jenkins	Paperback Best Sellers
5	Deadly Game	February 27, 2007	Ken Norton & Marigold "Mari" Smith	Paperback Best Sellers
6	Predatory Game	February 26, 2008	Jess "Jesse" Calhoun & Saber Wynter	Paperback Best Sellers: Fiction: Mass-Market
7	Murder Game	December 30, 2008	Kadan "Bishop" Montague & Tansy Meadows	Paperback Best Sellers: Fiction: Mass-Market
8	Street Game	December 29, 2009	Mack McKinley & Jaimie Fielding	Paperback Best Sellers: Fiction: Mass-Market
9	Ruthless Game	December 28, 2010	Kane Cannon & Rose Patterson	Paperback Best Sellers: Fiction: Mass-Market
10	Samurai Game	July 3, 2012	Sam "Knight" Johnson & Azami "Thorn" Yoshiie	Best Sellers: Combined Hardcover & Paperback Fiction
11	Viper Game	January 27, 2015	Wyatt Fontenot & Pepper	--
12	Spider Game	January 26, 2016	Trap Dawkins & Cayenne	--
13	Power Game	January 24, 2017	Ezekiel Fortunes & Bellisia Adams	--
14	Covert Game	March 20, 2018	Gino Mazza & Zara Hightower	--
15	Toxic Game	March 12, 2019	Dr. Draden Freeman & Shylah Cosmos	--
16	Lethal Game	March 3, 2020	Malichai Fortunes and Amaryllis	--
17	Lightning Game	March 2, 2021	Rubin Campo and Jonquille	--
18	Phantom Game	March 1, 2022	Jonas "Smoke" Harper and Camellia Mist	--
19	Ghostly Game	May 2, 2023	Gideon "Eagle" Carpenter and Laurel "Rory" Chappel	--
20	Thunder Game	May 6, 2025	--	--

== Leopard novels ==
This series focuses on shape-shifting leopards. Each book focuses on a mated couple who are destined to be together and have been together in other lifetimes.

Book #	Title	Publication date	Mates	New York Times best sellers lists
1	The Awakening	March 2003	Brandt Talbot & Maggie Odess	--
2	Wild Rain	February 2004	Rio Santana & Rachael Lospostos	--
3	Burning Wild	April 2009	Jake Bannaconni & Emma Reynolds	--
4	Wild Fire	April 2010	Connor Vega & Isabeau Chandler	--
5	Savage Nature	April 2011	Drake Donovan & Saria Boudreaux	--
6	Leopard's Prey	May 2013	Remy Boudreaux & Bijou Breaux	--
7	Cat's Lair	May 2015	Catarina Benoit & Eli Perez	--
8	Wild Cat	November 2015	Sienna Arnotta & Elijah Lospostos	--
9	Leopard's Fury	November 2016	Alonzo Massi/Fyodor Amurov & Evangeline Tregre	--
10	Leopard's Blood	October 2017	Joshua Tregre & Sonia Lopez	--
11	Leopard's Run	October 2018	Timur Amurov & Ashe Bronte	--
12	Leopard's Wrath	November 2019	Mitya Amurov & Ania Dover	--
13	Leopard's Rage	November 2020	Sevastyan Amurov & Flambe Carver	--
14	Leopard's Scar	November 2022	Meiling & Gideon	--
15	Leopard's Hunt	February 2024	Gorya Amurov & Maya Averina	--

== Shadow Riders novels ==
This series is about a Chicago crime family that hides a dark, mystical secret.

Book #	Title	Publication date	Couple	New York Times best sellers lists
1	Shadow Rider	June 2016	Stefano Ferraro & Francesca Cappello	--
2	Shadow Reaper	May 2017	Rico Ferraro & Mariko Tanaka (Majo)	--
3	Shadow Keeper	May 2018	Giovanni Ferraro & Sasha Provis	--
4	Shadow Warrior	June 2019	Vittorio Ferraro & Grace Murphy	--
5	Shadow Flight	May 2020	Taviano Ferraro & Nicoletta Gomez	--
6	Shadow Storm	May 2021	Emanuelle Ferraro & Valentino Saldi	--
7	Shadow Fire	April 2022	Elie Archambault & Brielle Couture	--
8	Shadow Dance	August 2023	Geno Ferraro & Amaranthe Aubert	--

== Sunrise Lake novels ==
Stand-alone novels that take place at Sunrise Lake resort.

Book #	Title	Publication date	Couple	New York Times best sellers lists
1	Murder at Sunrise Lake	June 2021	Stella Harrison & Sam Rossi	--
2	Red on the River	June 2022	Vienna Mortenson & Zale Vizzini	--
3	Deadly Storms	TBD	--	--

== Stand alone novels ==
Title	Publication date	Couple	New York Times best sellers lists
The Scarletti Curse	March 2001	Nicoletta Sigmora & Don Giovanni Scarletti	--
Lair of the Lion	September 2002	Isabella Vernaducci & Don Nicolai DeMarco	--
After the Music	November 2002	Jessica Fitzpatrick & Dillon Wentworth	--
Rocky Mountain Miracle	November 2004	Maia Armstrong & Cole Steele	--

== Collections and anthologies ==
Title	Publication date	Books included	Co-authors	NY Times best sellers list
After Twilight	September 2001	Dark Dream	Amanda Ashley, Ronda Thompson	--
Fantasy	March 2002	The Awakening	Sabrina Jeffries, Emma Holly, Elda Minger	--
A Very Gothic Christmas	November 2002	After the Music	Melanie George	--
The Only One	May 2003	Dark Descent	Susan Squires, Susan Grant	--
Lover Beware	July 2003	Magic in the Wind	Katherine Sutcliffe, Fiona Brand, Eileen Wilks	--
Hot Blooded	August 2004	Dark Hunger	Maggie Shayne, Emma Holly, Angela Knight	--
The Wicked and the Wondrous	October 2004	After the Music, The Twilight Before Christmas	--	--
The Shadows of Christmas Past	October 2004	Rocky Mountain Miracle	Susan Sizemore	--
Fever	January 2006	The Awakening, Wild Rain	--	--
Dark Dreamers	August 2006	Dark Dream	Marjorie M. Liu	Paperback Best Seller
A Christine Feehan Holiday Treasury	November 2006	After the Music, The Twilight Before Christmas, Rocky Mountain Miracle	--	--
Sea Storm	November 2010	Magic in the Wind, Oceans of Fire	--	--
Darkest at Dawn	November 2011	Dark Hunger, Dark Secret	--	Best Sellers: Paperback Trade Fiction
Dark Nights	October 2012	Dark Dream, Dark Descent	--	--
Magic Before Christmas	December 2013	Magic in the Wind, The Twilight Before Christmas	--	--
Edge of Darkness	August 2015	Dark Crime	Maggie Shayne, Lori Herter	--
