= Dark Celebration =

2006 novel by Christine Feehan

- First edition
- Author: Christine Feehan
- Language: English
- Series: Dark Series
- Genre: Romance, paranormal, fantasy
- Publisher: Berkley Books
- Publication date: 2006
- Publication place: United States
- Media type: Print (hardback & paperback)
- Pages: 384 pp (US paperback)
- ISBN: 0425211673
- Preceded by: Dark Demon
- Followed by: Dark Possession

Dark Celebration is a paranormal/suspense novel written by American author Christine Feehan. Published in 2006, it is the 17th book in her Dark Series, and is unique among the other books in the series, as the novel offers glimpses of life from previous characters from the series as well as introducing new characters.

== Plot summary ==
Raven Dubrinsky, lifemate to the Prince has contacted other lifemates in an effort to join the Carpathians in a Christmas celebration. Jacques' lifemate Shea is due to give birth at any time and the women feel that a gathering of the Carpathian community will help aid her. Before the celebration begins, Mikhail feels obliged to visit all of the Carpathian couples who appeared in the previous books. All the while there is a plot set by their enemies in an effort to destroy the Prince and the Carpathian people, making this a dark celebration.

== Main characters ==
Unlike other books in the series this one offers a glimpses of life from previous characters from the series as well as introducing new characters without having a main couple. Previous characters include:

- Mikhail and Raven from Dark Prince
- Gabriel and Francesca from Dark Legend
- Jacques and Shea from Dark Desire
- Gregori and Savannah from Dark Magic
- Aiden and Alexandria from Dark Gold
- Julian and Desari from Dark Challenge
- Darius and Tempest from Dark Fire
- Barack and Syndil from Dark Fire
- Lucian and Jaxon from Dark Guardian
- Byron and Antonietta from Dark Symphony
- Riordan and Juliette from Dark Hunger
- Rafael and Colby from Dark Secret
- Traian and Joie from Dark Descent
- Nicolae and Destiny from Dark Destiny
- Vikirnoff and Natalya from Dark Demon
- Dayan and Corrine from Dark Melody
- Falcon and Sara from Dark Dream

== Awards and nominations ==
- New York Times Bestseller List
- USA Today Bestseller List
- Publishers Weekly Bestseller List
- Barnes & Noble Mass Market Bestseller List
- Bookscan Bestseller List
- Border's Group Bestseller List
- Amazon Bestseller List
- Walmart Bestseller List
