= Mind Games =

Mind games are a struggle for psychological one-upmanship.

Mind Games or Mind Game may also refer to:

== Sports and games ==
- Mind sport, sports that require significant mental rather than physical effort
- In Your House 10: Mind Games, a WWE pay-per-view event
- Mind Games, an annual gaming convention sponsored by American Mensa where the Mensa Select prize is awarded
- Mind Games (Champions), a 1989 supplement for the role-playing game Champions

== Books ==
- Mind Game (novel), by Christine Feehan
- Mindgame (play), a play by Anthony Horowitz, published 2000
- The Mind Game (1980) by Norman Spinrad, a novel about the power of cults
- Mind Games (book), a 2010 collection of short stories by Richard Thieme
- BBC MindGames Magazine, a BBC puzzle magazine
- Mind Games: The Guide to Inner Space, a book by Robert Masters PhD and Jean Houston, from which John Lennon took the title for his song and album
- Mind Games: Amazing Mental Arithmetic Made Easy, a book by George Lane
- Mind Games (2010) by Carolyn Crane, her debut novel
- Mind Games (2019) by Annabel Vernon, about the psychology of elite sport

== Film and television ==
- Mind Game (film), a 2004 Japanese animated film
- Mindgame (1998 film), a direct-to-video Doctor Who title
- Mind Games (1989 film), a 1989 American thriller film
- Mind Games (2001 film), a 2001 British crime drama film
- Mind Game (TV series), a 2015 Singaporean television series
- Mind Games (TV series), a 2014 US television series
- "Mind Games" (Dawson's Creek), a 2001 television episode
- "Mind Games" (Generator Rex), a 2013 television episode
- "Mind Games" (Kim Possible), a 2002 television episode
- "Mind Games" (NCIS), a 2005 television episode
- Mind Games, a 2006 television movie starring Paul Johansson

== Music ==
- Mindgames (band), a rock band from Belgium

=== Albums ===
- Mind Games (John Lennon album), 1973
- Mind Games (Palisades album), 2015
- Mindgames (Greg Osby album), 1988
- Mind Games, a 2010 album by Paul Lamb

=== Songs ===
- "Mind Games" (Banks song), 2016
- "Mind Games" (John Lennon song), 1973
- "Mind Games" (Zard song), 1999
- "Mind Games", a song by Devo from their 2010 album Something for Everybody
