= 1980 in science fiction =

The year 1980 was marked, in science fiction, by the following:

== Events ==
- The first Nihon SF Taisho Award, for Japanese science fiction, is awarded
- Tor Books is founded by Tom Doherty
- The 38th annual Worldcon, Noreascon Two, was held in Boston, USA.

== Births and deaths ==
=== Births ===
- Christopher Paolini

=== Deaths ===
- Tom Godwin

== Literary releases ==
=== Novels ===
- Congo, by Michael Crichton
- Songs from the Stars, by Norman Spinrad

=== Comics ===
- Domu, by Katsuhiro Otomo
- La Foire aux immortels, by Enki Bilal
- The Incal, by Alejandro Jodorowsky and Mœbius, begins serialization in Métal Hurlant magazine

== Movies ==
- Battle Beyond the Stars, dir. by Jimmy T. Murakami
- The Empire Strikes Back, dir. by Irvin Kershner

== Television ==
- Space Runaway Ideon

== Video games ==
- Star Raiders

== Other media ==
- Car Wars board game

== Awards ==
=== Hugos ===
- Best novel: The Fountains of Paradise, by Arthur C. Clarke
- Best novella: Enemy Mine, by Barry B. Longyear
- Best novelette: "Sandkings", by George R. R. Martin
- Best short story: "The Way of Cross and Dragon", by George R. R. Martin
- Best related work: The Science Fiction Encyclopedia, by Peter Nicholls
- Best dramatic presentation: Alien, dir. by Ridley Scott; screenplay by Dan O'Bannon; story by Dan O'Bannon and Ronald Shusett
- Best professional editor: George H. Scithers
- Best professional artist: Michael Whelan
- Best fanzine: Locus, ed. by Charles N. Brown
- Best fan writer: Bob Shaw
- Best fan artist: Alexis Gilliland

=== Nebulas ===
- Best novel: Timescape, by Gregory Benford
- Best novella: Unicorn Tapestry, by Suzy McKee Charnas
- Best novelette: "The Ugly Chickens", by Howard Waldrop
- Best short story: "Grotto of the Dancing Deer", by Clifford D. Simak

=== Other awards ===
- BSFA Award for Best Novel: Timescape, by Gregory Benford
- Locus Award for Best Science Fiction Novel: Titan, by John Varley
- Saturn Award for Best Science Fiction Film: The Empire Strikes Back
