= Dark Fire (Feehan novel) =

Novel by Christine Feehan

- First edition
- Author: Christine Feehan
- Cover artist: John Ennis
- Language: English
- Series: Dark Series
- Genre: Romance, paranormal, fantasy
- Publisher: Love Spell
- Publication date: 2001
- Publication place: United States
- Media type: Print (hardback & paperback)
- Pages: 390 (US paperback)
- ISBN: 0-505-52447-3
- OCLC: 47760548
- LC Class: CPB Box no. 1841 vol. 13
- Preceded by: Dark Challenge
- Followed by: Dark Dream

Dark Fire is the sixth book in the paranormal/romance series Dark Series by American author Christine Feehan. It is the second book in a trilogy written within the Dark Series, and it starts several months after the events in Dark Challenge.

== Synopsis ==
When Darius, the leader of a group of Carpathian musicians, first sees the new mechanic hired to work on the band's touring vehicles, he is astonished to see the red color of her hair. It has been centuries since he last saw colors or even felt emotions.

Although the mechanic Tempest Trine needs the job, she quickly realizes that in touring with Darius, she's bitten off more than she can chew. Tempest has always felt different, apart from others, but from the moment his arms close around her, enveloping her in a sorcerer's spell, Darius seems to understand her unique gifts.

== Plot ==
Months after the events of Dark Challenge, Darius takes a look at the new mechanic, Tempest Trine. Darius takes a while to realize that she is his true lifemate, a concept newly introduced to him by Julian Savage, his sister Desari's new lifemate. Julian is also the first person to note the fact, and is certain that a good show is coming for the family unit to watch.

Tempest, however, has no intention of staying with Darius, whom she thinks is a vampire. After being persuaded that they are not, in fact, vampires, "Rusti" Tempest Trine proves a loyal ally.

She is another (the fourth) female human to undergo conversion to a Carpathian, after Darius completes the transfusion.

== Awards ==
2001 PEARL AWARDS

- ParaNormal Excellence Awards in Romantic Literature
- Best Shapeshifter
- Best Overall Paranormal

2001 Romantic Times Reviewers' Choice Awards

- Won - Best Vampire Romance
- Nominee - Mainstream Novels

2001 RIO Dorothy Parker Awards

- 3rd Place - Paranormal Romances

2001 Reader's Choice Awards from Love Romances

- Honorable Mention - Best Paranormal Romance
- Honorable Mention - Best Vampire Romance

2001 RBL Romantica Hughie Awards

- Won - Best Cover

== See also ==
- Dark Prince
- Dark Desire
- Dark Gold
- Dark Magic
- Carpathians
