= Dark Legend =

Dark Legend may refer to:

- Dark Legend (novel), by American author Christine Feehan
- Dark Legend (video game)
- Overlord: Dark Legend, an action role-playing game
