= Ghostwalker series =

Novel series by Christine Feehan

- First twelve books
- Shadow Game (2003); Mind Game (2004); Night Game (2005); Conspiracy Game (2006); Deadly Game (2007); Predatory Game (2008); Murder Game (2008); Street Game (2009); Ruthless Game (2010); Samurai Game (2012); Viper Game (2015); Spider Game (2016); Power Game (2017); Covert Game (2018); Toxic Game (2019); Lethal Game (2020); Lightning Game (2021); Phantom Game (2022); Ghostly Game (2023); Thunder Game (2025)
- Author: Christine Feehan
- Country: United States
- Language: English
- Genre: Romance, paranormal, fantasy
- Publisher: Jove Books
- Published: August 26, 2003–present
- No. of books: 20
- Website: Christine Feehan's website

The Ghostwalker series is the name for a collection of paranormal/romance novels by the American author Christine Feehan which feature the a group of men in the Special Forces and young women who have had their psychic abilities enhanced in a secret experiment.

== Novels in the series ==
1. Shadow Game (August 26, 2003)
2. Mind Game (July 27, 2004)
3. Night Game (November 1, 2005)
4. Conspiracy Game (October 31, 2006)
5. Deadly Game (February 27, 2007)
6. Predatory Game (February 26, 2008)
7. Murder Game (December 30, 2008)
8. Street Game (December 29, 2009)
9. Ruthless Game (December 28, 2010)
10. Samurai Game (July 3, 2012)
11. Viper Game (January 27, 2015)
12. Spider Game (January 26, 2016)
13. Power Game (January 24, 2017)
14. Covert Game (March 20, 2018)
15. Toxic Game (March 12, 2019)
16. Lethal Game (March 3, 2020)
17. Lightning Game (March 2, 2021)
18. Phantom Game (March 1, 2022)
19. Ghostly Game (May 2, 2023)
20. Thunder Game (May 6, 2025)

== Ghostwalkers ==
The Ghostwalker series has groups of men (and a few women), called Ghostwalkers who go on special missions. Ghostwalkers have psychic abilities and genetic enhancements, some abilities and enhancements are more rare than others. Each Ghostwalker team must have an "anchor" who draws the psychic backlash, especially of violence, away from the other team-members. Without an anchor, the Ghostwalkers' abilities are limited because of the psychic backlash and the inability to manage in crowds.

== Ghostwalker teams and corresponding book ==
Team One (11)

- Ryland "King" Miller & Lily Whitney – Shadow Game
- Raoul "Gator" Fontenot & Iris "Flame" Johnson - Night Game
- Kaden "Bishop" Montague & Tansy Meadows - Murder Game
- Jeff Hollister - ?
- Ian McGillicuddy - ?
- Tucker Addison - ?
- Nicolas "Nico" Trevane & Dahlia Le Blanc - Mind Game
- Sam "Knight" Johnson & Azami "Thorn" Yoshiie – Samurai Game
- Kyle "Ratchet" Forbes - ?
- Jonas "Smoke" Harper & Camellia Mist - Phantom Game
- Tom "Shark" Delaney - married to Angela Delaney (part of Murder Game)

Team One deceased members: Dwayne Gibson, Morrison, Ron Shaver, Russell Cowling

Team Two (9)

- Jess "Jesse" Calhoun & Saber Wynter - Predatory Game
- Logan Maxwell - ?
- Neil Campbell - ?
- Martin Howard - ?
- Todd Aikens - ?
- Trace Aikens - ?
- Jack Norton & Briony "Bri" Jenkins – Conspiracy Game
- Ken Norton & Marigold "Mari" Smith - Deadly Game
- Antonio Martinez - ?

Team Three (11)

- Kane Cannon & Rose Patterson – Ruthless Game
- Mack McKinley & Jaimie Feildings - Street Game
- Javier Enderman & Rihanna Bonds -Ruthless Game
- Gideon Carpenter & Laurel "Rory" Chappel - Ghostly Game
- Paul Mangan - ?
- Brian Hutton - ?
- Jacob Princeton - ?
- Ethan Myers - ?
- Marc Lands - ?
- Lucas Atherton - ?

Team Four (10)

- Wyatt Fontenot & Pepper - Viper Game
- Joe Spagnola - ? (possibly paired with Violet Smyth)
- Malichai Fortunes & Amaryllis Johnson - Lethal Game
- Ezekiel Fortunes & Bellisia - Power Game
- Mordechai Fortunes - ?
- Trap Dawkins & Cayenne - Spider Game
- Draden Freeman & Shylah Cosmos - Toxic Game
- Gino Mazza & Zara Hightower - Covert Game
- Diego Campo & Leila - Thunder Game
- Ruben Campo & Jonquille - Lightning Game
