= Dark Dream =

2001 novel by Christine Feehan

- First standalone publication (HarperCollins)
- Author: Christine Feehan
- Language: English
- Series: Dark Series
- Genre: Romance, paranormal, fantasy
- Publisher: 2001 in After Twilight (Love Spell)
- Publication place: United States
- Media type: Print (hardback & paperback), audio (MP3, CD & Cassette)
- Followed by: Dark Legend

Dark Dream is a paranormal/suspense novel written by American author Christine Feehan. It was originally published in the anthologies After Twilight (2001) and Dark Dreamers (2006) before appearing on its own in 2010. It is the seventh book in her Dark Series, which to date has 38 titles.

== Plot summary ==
Dark Dream tells the story of Falcon and Sara. Sara is Falcon's lifemate, as he has returned to his homeland to meet the now Prince Mikhail Dubrinsky and his lifemate Raven. When he rescues Sara Marten from a gang of street punks, he knows he has found the woman he has sought all his life. Sara has spent fifteen years hiding from a vampire who destroyed her family when she was a girl. At first, she believes Falcon to be him, or something like him. When she learns the truth, she accepts what must be, but holds off on committing to him until the children she has been rescuing and caring for are safe.

== Awards ==
2001 PEARL AWARDS

- ParaNormal Excellence Awards in Romantic Literature
- Best Shapeshifter
- Best Overall Paranormal

2001 Romantic Times Reviewers' Choice Awards

- Won - Best Vampire Romance
- Nominee - Mainstream Novels

2001 RIO Dorothy Parker Awards

- 3rd Place - Paranormal Romances

2001 Reader's Choice Awards from Love Romances

- Honorable Mention - Best Paranormal Romance
- Honorable Mention - Best Vampire Romance

2001 RBL Romantica Hughie Awards

- Won - Best Cover

== See also ==
- Dark Prince
- Dark Desire
- Dark Gold
- Dark Magic
- Carpathians
