= Dark Guardian =

Dark Guardian may refer to:

- Dark Guardian (novel series), a series of young-adult paranormal romance novels by Rachel Hawthorne
- Dark Guardian (novel), a paranormal/suspense novel by Christine Feehan
