= Shadow Game =

Shadow Game or variants may refer to:

- Shadow Game (CBS Playhouse), a 1969 teleplay as part of the CBS Playhouse series

== Books ==
- Shadow Games (novel), the 1989 novel by Glen Cook
- Shadow Game (novel), the 2003 novel by Christine Feehan
- Shadow Games, a 1990s novel by Ed Gorman
  - Shadow Games and Other Sinister Stories of Show Business, a 2016 short story collection by Ed Gorman
- Shadow Games, a 2011 Star Wars Legends novel by Michael Reaves and Maya Kaathryn Bohnhoff

== Other ==
- A type of game played in Yu-Gi-Oh!
