= The Shadow Riders (disambiguation) =

The Shadow Riders (film) is a 1982 TV film starring Tom Selleck and Sam Elliott based on the Louis L'Amour novel.

The Shadow Riders or Shadow Riders may also refer to:

- Shadow Riders, a fictional villain group in the Yu-Gi-Oh! GX series
- The Shadow Riders, a 1982 novel by Louis L'Amour
- Shadow Riders, a series of novels by Christine Feehan

== See also ==
- The Shadow Rider, a 1943 novel by William Colt MacDonald
- "Shadow Rider", a song by King Kobra from Ready to Strike (1985)
- Shadow Raiders animated television series
