= Dark Fire =

Dark Fire(s) may refer to:

== Literature ==
- Dark Fire (Feehan novel), a novel by Christine Feehan
- Dark Fire (Sansom novel), a novel by C. J. Sansom
- Dark Fire (The Last Dragon Chronicles), a novel by Chris D'Lacey
- Dark Fire, a novel by Ann Maxwell
- Dark Fire, a novel by Peggy Webb
- Dark Fire, a novel by Robyn Donald
- Dark Fires, a novel by Brenda Joyce
- Dark Fires, a novel by Rosemary Rogers

== Other uses ==
- Gibson Dark Fire, a Robot Guitar made by Gibson
