= Dark Secret =

Dark Secret may refer to:

- Dark Secret (novel), a 2005 novel by Christine Feehan
- Dark Secret (horse) (1929–1934), American Thoroughbred racehorse
- Dark Secret (film), 1949 UK film based on play The Crime at Blossoms
- Dark Secret (novel), a 2016 novel by Edward M. Lerner
