= Clarion West Writers Workshop =

US non-profit organization

Clarion West is a non-profit organization best known for their intensive six-week workshop for writers preparing for professional careers in speculative fiction. The Six-Week Workshop is a space for writing short stories and learning how to workshop them under the guidance of staff and luminaries of the speculative fiction field. The workshop runs annually from late June through the end of July. Each of the six weeks is instructed by a different professional writer or editor. The roster of guest instructors changes yearly. Founded in Seattle, Washington, in 1971, the workshop has been held continuously since 1984.

Clarion West, has added through the years a variety of online classes, events, and two to four day workshops, as well as a library of on-demand classes accessible to members anytime. 2025 saw the first nine-month online workshop geared toward writers interested in working on their novels.

The Clarion West board of directors as of 2024 includes Shweta Adhyam, Izzy Wasserstein, M. Huw Evans, Kris Millering, M. L. Krishnan, Jon Lasser, Alexandra Manglis, Tod McCoy, Dominica Phetteplace, Nisi Shawl, and Yang-Yang Wang.

== History ==
The 1971 Clarion West Writers Workshop was founded by Vonda N. McIntyre, a Clarion Workshop graduate and Nebula and Hugo Award-winning author, with the support of original Clarion founder Robin Scott Wilson. It was modeled after the original Clarion Workshop founded in 1968 at Clarion University of Pennsylvania (itself inspired by the Milford Writer's Workshop). The original Clarion Workshop was slated to close after holding final classes in 1970, and the effort was made to establish and continue Clarion workshops in other locations. The 1971 successor workshops that sprang from this effort were Clarion West Workshop founded in Seattle, and Clarion Workshop revived in New Orleans (later moved to Michigan in 1972, and San Diego in 2007). Clarion West operated until 1973, before a hiatus.

In 1984, Clarion West graduate J. T. Stewart and Seattle writer, Marilyn J. Holt, reconvened the workshop with the support of founder Vonda N. McIntyre. Clarion West incorporated as a nonprofit organization with a board of directors in 1986 with the help of many dedicated Clarion West alumni. Currently the workshop is administered by Jae Steinbacher. Although the workshop is located in close proximity to the University of Washington, it is not associated with the university. It has operated continuously to the present day.

== Workshop format ==
The workshop is combination of instruction and mutual student critique using the Clarion Method. The emphasis of learning is primarily geared toward hours spent reading, writing and critiquing. Normally, students are expected to write one complete draft of a story per week, to be critiqued the following week. Ideas for these stories are up to the student, but the emphasis is that the writing takes place on premises where fresh lessons and insight can be immediately applied to new story ideas. Work on 'trunk' stories, written before the workshop, is discouraged.

The class lecture and critique runs weekdays from morning to early afternoon. The remainder of the day is typically divided between writing for the next week's story deadline, reading, and preparing critiques. The workload is intense, but breaks and socializing are typical at all hours. Weekends are free time to socialize, explore the local sights, and catch up on unfinished writing and reading.

Each student typically gets a weekly private conference with each instructor to ask questions and gain insight from that professional writer or editor.

Although the focus of the workshop is on speculative fiction, such as science fiction and fantasy, other genres, including horror, comedy, mystery, and literary writing (and mixtures thereof) regularly grace the workshop stories. The workshop focuses on writing and critiquing short stories, but many aspects of novel writing are also discussed in workshop.

== Extracurricular activities ==
The speculative fiction community around the Seattle area has built support for the workshop over the years, and many special events have become part of the Clarion West tradition.

- Clarion West Parties: These invitation-only events are attended by the students and administrators, graduated alumni, and many established writers, editors, agents, and fans in the industry.
- Readings and Book Signings: These public events allow students and the public to experience readings by the instructing writers. They are regularly hosted by the Seattle Public Library, local bookstores, Hugo House, and Town Hall Seattle.

== Traditions ==
There are a number of class traditions passed down from one class to the next in the manner of a secret society. Traditions that are publicly known include the yearly Clarion West class shirt (designed by the class and limited only to the classmates and instructors of that year), and the practice of presenting unusual gifts to each of the instructors. Classes often come up with new traditions and items to pass on to the next year's class.

== Applications ==
Space in the workshop is awarded to the top 18 applicants of all submissions received. The average number of applications is not disclosed and varies year to year.

The application window typically opens December 1 and runs through March 1 for the year attending. Students are usually selected and informed of acceptance by the end of March.

Although Clarion West and Clarion are run independently, they follow the same workshop method and are considered sister schools. Since both workshops run concurrently, students are often encouraged to apply to both workshops to increase their chances of attending that year. Students accepted to both programs must choose their preferred workshop. Each of the schools has similar but distinct guidelines.

Students that graduate one of the Clarion workshops are considered alumni of all the Clarion programs, and may not re-apply for any other Clarion Workshop.

== Notable Clarion West instructors ==
- Ted Chiang
- Octavia E. Butler
- Ellen Datlow
- Samuel R. Delany
- Gardner Dozois
- Harlan Ellison
- Neil Gaiman
- Joe Hill
- George R. R. Martin
- James Patrick Kelly
- Ursula K. Le Guin
- Robert Silverberg
- Michael Swanwick
- Gene Wolfe
- Roger Zelazny
- N. K. Jemisin
- Stephen Graham Jones
- Sheila Williams

== Notable Clarion West graduates ==
- Daniel Abraham
- Cassandra Rose Clarke
- Andy Duncan
- Kij Johnson
- Fiona Kelleghan
- Ann Leckie
- David D. Levine
- Carlton Mellick III
- Mary Anne Mohanraj
- Eric Nylund
- Susan Palwick
- Cat Rambo
- Benjamin Rosenbaum
- Diana Rowland
- Lawrence Schimel
- John Shirley
- Gordon Van Gelder
- N. Lee Wood
- Ibi Zoboi
- Cadwell Turnbull
- Nisi Shawl
- Zin E. Rocklyn

== Other Clarion workshops ==
Other Clarion workshops that use the same workshop format, but are independently run include:

- Clarion Writers Workshop, held annually in San Diego, California, since 2007. It was founded at Clarion University of Pennsylvania in 1968.
- Clarion South Writers Workshop, held biennially in Brisbane, Australia. It was founded in 2004 and has since ceased operation.
