= The Void Captain's Tale =

1983 science fiction novel by Norman Spinrad

- Author: Norman Spinrad
- Language: English
- Genre: Science fiction novel
- Publication date: 1983
- Publication place: United States
- Media type: Print
- Followed by: Child of Fortune

The Void Captain's Tale is a 1983 science fiction novel by the American author Norman Spinrad. The Void Captain's Tale takes place three or four thousand years in the future in an era called the Second Starfaring Age, a setting Spinrad revisited in the 1985 novel Child of Fortune. The book contains elements of confession, love story, eroticism, and horror.

== Plot ==
Like Child of Fortune, The Void Captain's Tale is written in a unique mix of English words, foreign words, and invented words—the first-person perspective of a possibly unreliable narrator, the voidship captain Genro Kane Gupta. Genro's starship is part transport, part pleasure vessel. While the majority of passengers are kept in suspended animation, a wealthy few, the Floating Cultura, spend the voyage in the pursuit of pleasure—it is Genro's job to entertain these passengers. Unlike the technological focus of many science fiction novels, Genro claims the exact nature of space travel is not understood; the ship's interstellar drive is powered by the psychic energy of a young woman pilot. Theodore Sturgeon explained the "erotic form of space travel" in the Los Angeles Times Book Review: "Spinrad's ingenious space-drive has the ship's machine create a field ... which at peak and at captain's command melds with the pilot's psyche, causing the ship to cease to exist in one spatial locus and reappear in another." During transit, the pilot experiences orgasm. Typically pilots are not part of the social life of the ship, and the occupation takes a physical toll.

Spinrad outlines the entire plot of the book in the first few pages. The remainder of the novel simply goes into more detail. Most of the book deals with Genro's obsession with his pilot, Dominique Alia Wu. Pilots experience a quasi-religious ecstasy during jump, and Dominique believes she can permanently merge with the Great and Only with the captain's help. Eventually, when Genro cannot resist the temptation, he has sexual intercourse with the pilot, setting off a chain reaction of events which result in the captain losing both his sexual prowess and his status as leader of the floating cultura. His growing disassociation from society and his allegiance to the succubus-like hold of the pilot's psychic siren call lead to his eventual submission to Dominique's will, and he jumps the ship without first laying in any coordinates—freeing Dominique from both the physical world and her sexual servitude to the jump circuit, but trapping his ship and its passengers in the void between the stars.

== Reception ==
According to some sources, The Void Captain's Tale, and Child of Fortune received "considerable attention". Many of Spinrad's books have provoked controversy, and The Void Captain's Tale, with numerous sexually-explicit passages, was no exception. The novel received positive reviews in the Los Angeles Times and The New York Times, although the New York Times reviewer noted readers would need to meet the author halfway. A Library Journal review made a similar point but came to a different conclusion, noting "one may be able to wring a highly rewarding experience from this dense and difficult novel," but calling Spinrad's use of language "laborious reading".

Dave Langford reviewed The Void Captain's Tale for White Dwarf #64, and stated that "the story succeeds. It's over-long, it bogs down in portentousness, but the chase of the metaphysical white whale still compels. Worth a look, though younger readers may need to protect impressionable parents from the many sex scenes."

The Void Captain's Tale was nominated for the 1983 Nebula Award for best novel and the 1984 Locus Award for Best Science Fiction Novel.
