= Dark Slayer =

2009 novel by Christine Feehan

- First edition
- Author: Christine Feehan
- Cover artist: Larry Rostant
- Language: English
- Series: Dark Series
- Genre: Romance, paranormal, fantasy
- Published: Berkley Books
- Publication date: 2009
- Publication place: United States
- Media type: Print (hardback & paperback)
- Pages: 416 pp (US paperback)
- ISBN: 0425229734
- Preceded by: Dark Curse
- Followed by: Dark Peril

Dark Slayer is the twentieth title in Christine Feehan's Dark Series, a series of paranormal/romance novels featuring the Carpathians.

== Awards and nominations ==
The novel appeared in several bestseller lists:

- New York Times
- USA Today
- Publishers Weekly
- Barnes & Noble Mass Market
- Bookscan
- Borders
- Amazon
- Walmart
