= N. Lee Wood =

American author (born 1955)

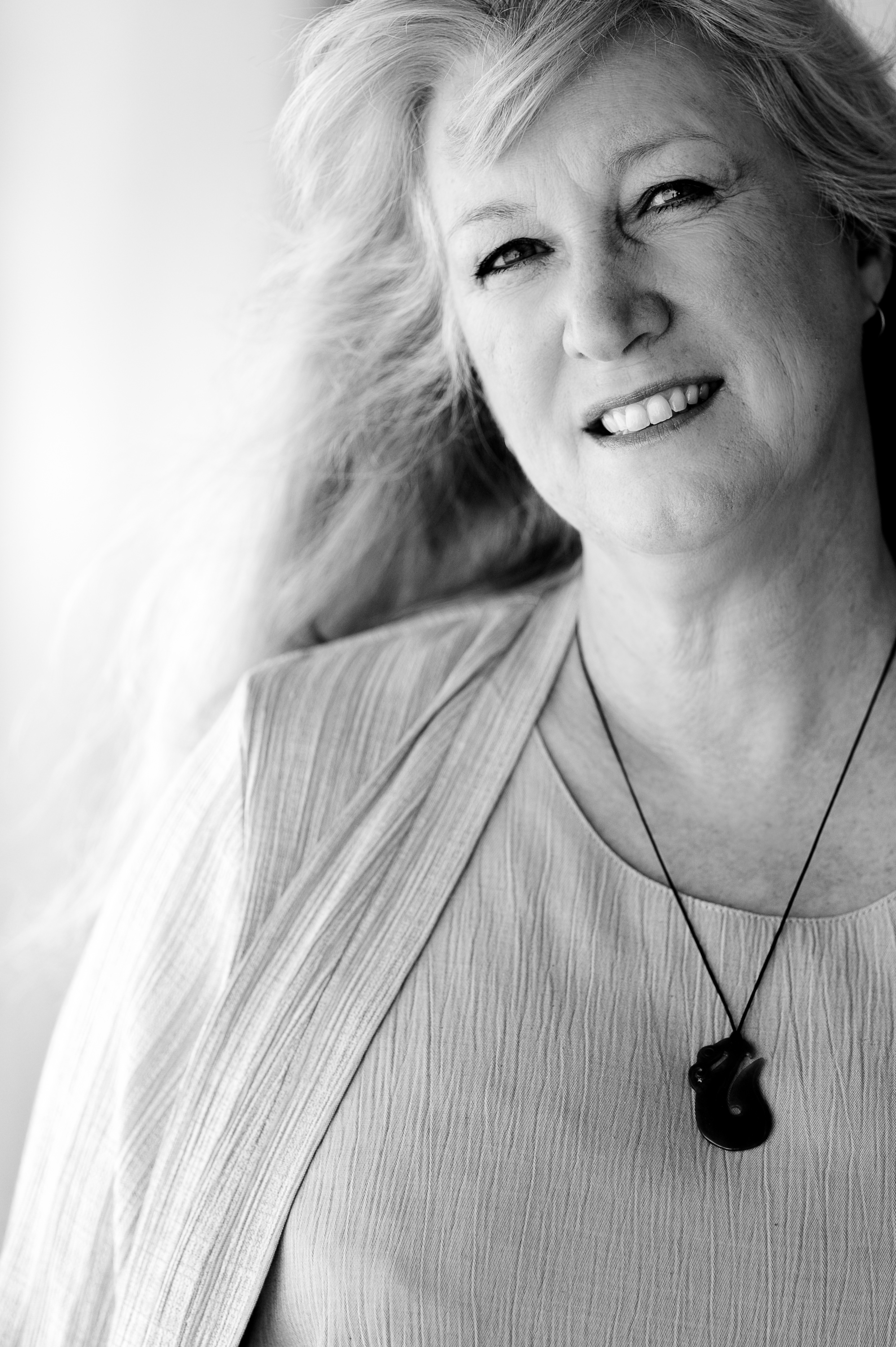
- Born: November 15, 1955 (age 70); Hartford, Connecticut, U.S.
- Citizenship: New Zealand
- Education: Open University
- Occupation: Writer
- Spouse: Norman Spinrad (m. 1990–2005)

N. Lee Wood (born November 15, 1955) is an American author. She has written science fiction, fantasy, crime and mainstream novels.

== Biography ==
N. Lee Wood was born November 15, 1955, in Hartford, Connecticut. She became a naturalized citizen of New Zealand in November, 2020, and currently lives in Taranaki.

She earned a master's degree in English literature from the Open University of Great Britain.

She is an alumna of the Clarion West Writers Workshop. Wood has travelled widely, and lived in the UK, France, Australia, and New Zealand.

She was married to author Norman Spinrad from 1990 to 2005.

== Awards and honors ==
Her novel Looking for the Mahdi was nominated for the 1997 Arthur C. Clarke Award.

== Selected works ==
=== Novels ===
- Faraday's Orphans (1995)
- Looking for the Mahdi (1996)
- Bloodrights (1999)
- Master of None (2002)
- Redemption (as Lee Jackson, 2007)

=== Inspector Keen Dunliffe Series ===
- Kingdom of Lies (2005)
- Kingdom of Silence (2009)

=== Short fiction ===
- "Molly Haskowin" (1990)
- "Memories that Dance Like Dust in the Summer Heat" (1990)
- "In the Land of No" (1991)
- "Three Merry Pranksters at the Louvre" (2000)
- "Thicker than Water" (2001)
- "Balzac" (2003)
- "Scapegoats" (2014)

=== Anthologies ===
- Nemira '94 with Romulus Bărbulescu, George Anania and Norman Spinrad (1994)

=== Essays ===
- "Report from Clarion West" (1985)
- "Magnum Opus Con (III)" (1988)
- "1988 World Sf Meeting in Budapest" (1989)
- "ABA, Parisienne Style" (1989)
- "SF in France" (Locus #357) (1990)
- "World SF Meeting at Den Haag" (1990)
- "Parcon '90 Report" (1991)
- "SF in France" (Locus #372) (1992)
- "1992 Salon du Livre" (1992)
- "Freucon/1992 World SF Meeting" (1992)
- "Étonnants Voyaguers Festival" (1993)
- "1993 Salon du Livre" (1993)
