= Bug Jack Barron =

1969 novel by Norman Spinrad

- Cover of first edition (hardcover)
- Author: Norman Spinrad
- Cover artist: Jack Gaughan
- Language: English
- Genre: Science fiction
- Publisher: Walker & Co.
- Publication date: 1969
- Publication place: United States
- Media type: Print (hardcover)
- Pages: 372
- OCLC: 5497
- LC Class: LCCN 69-16094

Bug Jack Barron is a 1969 science fiction novel by American writer Norman Spinrad, first serialized in the New Worlds magazine under the editorship of Michael Moorcock. It was nominated for the 1970 Hugo Award. The novel is notable for its lyrical style and unique use of cut-up phrases. In this regard, Spinrad has cited the influence of Beat writers William S. Burroughs, Allen Ginsberg, and Jack Kerouac.

== Plot ==
The "Bug Jack Barron" talk show begins Wednesday evening with an on-air call from Rufus W. Johnson, who has been refused service by the Foundation for Human Immortality, an organization which allows people to have themselves cryonically frozen. Johnson accuses the Foundation of being unwilling to offer Freezer contracts to African Americans. Show host Jack Barron is appalled to hear this and after making a few calls, finds a supporter in the Governor of Mississippi, Lukas Greene.

The following day, Barron receives a visit from Foundation Chair Benedict Howards, who tries to gain Barron's support by offering him a free Freezer Contract and immortal life. Though tempted, Barron refuses the bribe. Howards later makes the same offer to Barron's ex-wife Sara. Sara dreams about being frozen together with Jack, and being revived together after an immortality treatment has been discovered.

The next morning, the Governor of California, Gregory Morris, suggests that Barron consider running as the next President of the United States. Though Barron is reluctant, his friend Lukas Greene (who is black and of radical political views) encourages Barron to accept. Barron then gets a call from Sara. The two argue about why they broke up and soon reconcile. Howards visits Barron again with new contracts for both Jack and Sara to sign. The new contracts not only guarantee being frozen, but also the immortality treatment. Jack cannot see any drawback in the contract, and he and Sara agree to sign.

On the next broadcast of “Bug Jack Barron”, a man named Henry George Franklin calls in and complains that he sold his young daughter to some wealthy men for $50,000. Even though the men promised to provide his daughter with a better life, Henry claims he was duped, and wants Barron to help him get his daughter back. Howards is furious that Franklin was on the show, and tells Barron to abandon the story. Intrigued by Howards's reaction, Barron flies to Evers, Mississippi to meet Franklin and speak with him. They meet in a restaurant in a low-income neighborhood and start by walking to the governor's mansion, when a sniper kills Franklin and attempts to shoot Barron as well. Barron deduces that Benedict Howards must have been behind the shooting and realizes in turn that the Foundation must also be responsible for buying Franklin's daughter. Barron later confirms his suspicion by using computer records to search for other children who are now missing.

Upon his return home, Barron shares all his suspicions with Sara. To get to the bottom of the mystery, Barron unveils a plan. He and Sara will receive their immortality treatment, and make Howards think he really has them trapped. Then when Howards admits to all his crimes, Jack will use a concealed very small portable telephone to record the confession. Sara agrees. The next day, they go to Howards's office and proceed with the treatment. When the treatment is over, Howards explains that the treatment consists of transplanting glands from the abducted children into new bodies. The children are killed off by radiation poisoning. Howards threatens if Barron exposes Howards, Howards will suborn witnesses to testify that Barron and Sara knew everything about the treatment, meaning that he and Sara will also be charged with murder.

Barron and Sara return home where he reveals to her the truth about the children and that he will support the Foundation in his next shows. When he goes to the show, he gets a call from Sara, who commits suicide in order to change his mind. With nothing left to lose, Barron reveals the truth during the show, while Howards goes paranoid on air, threatening to kill him. Barron begs the viewers to believe that he didn't know anything about the children beforehand.

Eventually, Barron does run for President, planning to give his position to future Vice-President Lukas Greene after his election.

== Reception ==
The book was serialised in the British New Wave science fiction magazine New Worlds during Michael Moorcock's editorship. Its explicit language and cynical attitude toward politicians, as well as the fact that the magazine was partially funded by the Arts Council of Great Britain, angered British Members of Parliament. Jennie Lee, then Minister of State for the Arts, defended the Arts Council's funding of the magazine without referring to the serialisation specifically. Later, it was banned by W. H. Smith, a major British chain of bookstores.

Algis Budrys gave the novel a mixed review, describing it as "a good book, an excellent idea and fair piece of writing." Budrys faulted the central science-fictional device as "absolute nonsense," saying that Spinrad "did not care enough about credibility to even be graceful," and noted that "Spinrad often uses representations of things, rather than the things themselves, and this doesn't always work." Still, he concluded, the book "is a flawed but acceptable telling of a magnificent story, a representation of nobility, one might say, with a Mickey Mouse ending." Joanna Russ, however, found the book to be "a bad book [where] the author is not in control of his material, but is in the process of being smothered by it." She faulted Spinrad's writing style ("Everybody talks like everybody else"), his plotting ("a novel of political intrigue ought to have an intelligible intrigue in it"), and characterization (the main antagonist is "only a villain-shaped hole crammed with super-high-gear prose"), concluding that the book was a "romantic, half-innocent, youthfully bouncy, exasperatingly schlocky and ultimately silly book."

In 1992, The New York Times noted that in Jack Barron, "Norman Spinrad created the talk-show host as powerful public-opinion maker."

== Adaptations ==
In 1983, author Harlan Ellison was hired to write a screenplay for a film to be directed by Costa-Gavras for Universal Pictures. After the project went nowhere, Ellison published this screenplay, titled "None of the Above," including casting suggestions that had Martin Sheen as Jack Barron and Sigourney Weaver as Sara.

== See also ==
- Sex and sexuality in speculative fiction
