= Other Americas =

1988 collection of stories by Norman Spinrad

- First edition
- Author: Norman Spinrad
- Cover artist: Todd Schorr
- Language: English
- Genre: Science fiction
- Publisher: Bantam Spectra
- Publication date: 1988
- Publication place: United States
- Media type: Print (paperback)
- Pages: 273 pp
- ISBN: 0-553-27214-4
- OCLC: 18632700

Other Americas is a collection of science fiction stories by author Norman Spinrad. It was originally published by Bantam Spectra in 1988.

== Contents ==
- "Street Meat". This novelette was originally published in Isaac Asimov's Science Fiction Magazine, Mid-December 1983
- "The Lost Continent". This novelette was originally published in Science Against Man in 1970
- "World War Last". This novella was originally published in Isaac Asimov's Science Fiction Magazine, August 1985
- "La Vie Continue", novella.
