= A World Between =

1979 novel by Norman Spinrad

Cover of the first edition, published by Pocket Books. Art by Peter Goodfellow.

A World Between is a science fiction novel by American writer Norman Spinrad, published in 1979.

== Plot summary ==
A World Between is a novel set on the planet Pacifica, where the government is a media democracy whose elections take place on a world-wide computer network.

== Reception ==
Greg Costikyan reviewed A World Between in Ares Magazine #1. Costikyan commented that "In Spinrad's firm hands, the result is a gripping story from start to finish. His portrayal of Pacifican society is so convincing that the reader takes for granted its differences from our own, and his depiction of all three sides' propaganda would be like. If Spinrad sometimes succumbs to the urge to preach, what he preaches is democracy, sexual equality, and human understanding; surely, we can forgive him for this."

== Reviews ==
- Review by Doug Fratz (1979) in Thrust, #13, Fall 1979
- Review by Charles Platt (1980) in Foundation, #18 January 1980
