= The Druid King =

2003 novel by Norman Spinrad

- Cover of the 2003 Alfred A. Knopf edition
- Author: Norman Spinrad
- Language: English
- Publication date: 2003

The Druid King is a 2003 historical novel by American novelist Norman Spinrad. The novel is set during the Gallic Campaigns of Julius Caesar. The main protagonist of the novel is Vercingetorix and the plot follows his rise to power to become king of the Gauls and his eventual surrender to Caesar at the Battle of Alesia. The book is a novelisation of an early version of the script for Vercingétorix, la Légende du Druide Roi, a French language film.

== Development ==
While working on the script for the French Language film Vercingétorix, la Légende du Druide Roi, Spinrad collaborated on many revisions with the director Jacques Dorfmann. Friends of Spinrad had really enjoyed earlier versions of the script, but when the fourteenth revision was produced, Spinrad was unhappy with it, so decided to revive the earlier third revision as a novel.

In researching the novel, Spinrad was forced to largely rely on Caesar's accounts of the events, however he used the internet to help do additional research into the lifestyle and culture of the Gauls.

== Genre ==
The novel is set in a historical setting and uses conventions of historical fiction. However, one reviewer noted that the novel felt like high fantasy without the magic and magical creatures.

== Plot ==
The novel begins as Caesar searches for an excuse to use his Roman legions in Gaul in order to gain political capital in Rome. He makes a deal with Diviaxc of the Edui tribe, to allow the Romans to trade with the tribe and hurt another tribe attacking the Gauls. Caesar means to use the alliance and trade activities to provoke some sort of war with the Gauls and precipitate war between Rome and the Gauls. Meanwhile, Vercingetorix follows his father, who is the elected leader of the Arverni. and observes a gathering held by his father which seeks to bring together the Gallic tribes in order to oppose Roman expansion. His father attempts to become a king over all the tribes, but the other leaders resist and capture Vercingetorix's father and kill him. Vercingetorix barely escapes their pursuit with the help of the arch druid, Guttuatr. Guttuatr takes Vercingetorix under his wing, and trains him to become a druid. While training with the Druids he encounters the amazon warrior, Rhea, who teaches him how to fight and vows to always be his sister warrior upon her virginity.

Caesar decides to invade Britain, offering the Gauls half of the pillage if they accompany him. However, unbeknownst to the Gallic allies, Caesar plans to send the Gauls ahead of him into battle in order for many of their warriors and leaders to be killed. While traveling north with his column of Roman infantry and his Gallic allies, Caesar encounters Vercingetorix who has left the druid training in order to reclaim his father's wealth amongst the Arverni. Vercingetorix is again elected their leader. Soon, Vercingetorix takes a military force to join Caesar's invasion of Britain. At the camp, Vercingetorix is again reintroduced to his childhood love Marah, who has become enamoured with Caesar. Though Caesar attempts to bring Vercingetorix under his wing, Vercingetorix has a falling out with Caesar after the death of another Gallic leader. Vercingetorix becomes outlawed and Caesar leaves a portion of his army to subdue the Gallic forces which rebelled against him. This force effectively subdues Gaul before Caesar returns victorious from Britain and when Caesar returns, they have garrisoned all of the major Gallic cities.

Vercingetorix resists, and eventually, through support of the high druid and political maneuvering, gains the support of the various Gallic factions. United, the next year they resist the Roman Army through a combination of scorched earth and guerrilla tactics, overcoming the Roman superiority through discipline. However, Caesar realises that the Gauls could not resist a siege, and after months of maneuvering, forces Vercingetorix to move his army to Alesia where the superior siege technology of the Romans traps Vercingetorix in the city, and successfully resists the reinforcements of all the tribes of Gaul.

== Style ==
The language of the novel has been called full of "vivid details" and one reviewer noted that the language was the most enticing part of the novel. John Snider noted that the novel is particularly good at retelling the details of battle scenes.

== Themes ==
Selfless heroism is central to the novel, one reviewer noting that the heroism could be compared to that represented in the Arthurian legends.

== Reception ==
John Snider of the online Science Fiction magazine Scifidimensions called the book fantastic, noting it as particularly vivid novel which beautifully retells the story of Vercingetorix. The Copperfield Review also noted that Spinrad immerses the reader in a vivid retelling of the historical setting.

However, The Independent noted that the book was highly professional and predictable but did not have as much passion and depth as other novels.
