= Night Game (novel) =

- First edition
- Author: Christine Feehan
- Language: English
- Series: Ghostwalker
- Genre: Romance, paranormal, fantasy
- Publisher: Jove Books
- Publication date: November 1, 2005
- Publication place: United States
- Media type: Print (hardback & paperback)
- ISBN: 0-515-13976-9
- OCLC: 62125215
- LC Class: CPB Box no. 2410 vol. 22
- Preceded by: Mind Game
- Followed by: Conspiracy Game

Night Game is the third title in the Ghostwalker series of paranormal romance novels by Christine Feehan.

The novel appeared on several bestseller lists including those of The New York Times, Publishers Weekly and USA Today.

== Plot introduction ==
Gator Fontenot of the Special Forces paranormal squad can't refuse an urgent response to save the Iris "Flame" Johnson, a victim of the same horrific experiments that warped Gator. Now unleashed, she is a flame-haired weapon of unimaginable destructive powers, a walking time bomb bent on revenge in the sultry bayous of New Orleans, and hunted by a shadowy assassin. It is Gator's job to reel Iris in.

== See also ==
- Shadow Game
- Mind Game
- Conspiracy Game
- Deadly Game
