= Dark Possession =

2007 novel by Christine Feehan

- First edition
- Author: Christine Feehan
- Cover artist: Larry Rostant
- Language: English
- Series: Dark Series
- Genre: Romance, paranormal, fantasy
- Published: Berkley Books
- Publication date: 2007
- Publication place: United States
- Media type: Print (hardback & paperback)
- Pages: 368 pp (US paperback)
- ISBN: 0425217094
- Preceded by: Dark Celebration
- Followed by: Dark Curse

Dark Possession is a paranormal/suspense novel written by American author Christine Feehan. Published in 2007, it is the 18th book in the Dark Series.

== Plot summary ==
In the previous novel, Dark Celebration, Manolito De La Cruz was very close to turning and when he happened upon Mary Ann Delaney he found his lifemate. Mary Ann, however, was complaining about Carpathian men and how she would never be with one and would count on the Prince to protect her. Upon hearing this, Manolito manipulates Mary Ann unbeknownst to the others and makes a blood bond and leaves her with no memory of it. Mary Ann is a counselor for battered women and is visiting the Carpathian mountains with her best friend Destiny and her lifemate Nicolae. Upon learning this, Manolito goes to his brother Riordan's lifemate, Juliette, and convinces her to seek out Mary Ann to help her sister back in South America. During the celebration, however, he puts himself between a mage trying to kill a pregnant woman and is mortally injured.

Mary Ann is approached by Juliette De La Cruz who convinces her to go to South America to help counsel her younger sister, but during the celebration she witnessed the death of a man, Manolito, and can't seem to get over it. She goes to South America but is so depressed and abnormal she is unable to treat Juliette's sister. Manolito is not dead, however, as he is saved by the race's best healer, and awakens in South America with only the memory of going to the celebration. While sick, healer must basically resurrect him from the dead. Riordan attempts to aid him but Manolito's broken mind sees him as a threat. Convinced something is wrong with Manolito, Riordan and Juliette also notice something wrong with Mary Ann. Putting the pieces together they realize that she is the only one who can save Manolito and they set out to aid him.

Mary Ann views herself as just a human, but there is more to her than she realizes. She is able to go head to head with Manolito, who has no memory of creating the blood bond, but Manolito's brain isn't as damaged as they thought, for there is a nefarious plot that could bring both the Carpathian and human worlds crashing down.

== Main characters ==
- Manolito De La Cruz
- Mary Ann Delaney

== Awards and nominations ==
- New York Times Bestseller List
- Publishers Weekly Bestseller List
- USA Today Bestseller List
- Barnes & Noble Mass Market Bestseller List
- Borders Bestseller List
- Amazon Bestseller List
- Booksense Bestseller List
- Wall Street Journal Bestseller List
- Washington Post Bestseller List
