= The Last Hurrah of the Golden Horde =

1970 collection of science fiction stories by Norman Spinrad

- First edition cover
- Author: Norman Spinrad
- Cover artist: David Chestnutt
- Language: English
- Genre: Science fiction
- Publisher: Nelson Doubleday
- Publication date: July 1970
- Publication place: United States
- Media type: Print (paperback)
- Pages: 223 pp
- OCLC: 4048462

The Last Hurrah of the Golden Horde is the first collection of science fiction stories by author Norman Spinrad. It was originally published by Nelson Doubleday in August 1970 with a Science Fiction Book Club edition and by Avon Books the following month.

The Last Hurrah of the Golden Horde placed eighth in the Locus Poll for best SF anthology or collection of the year. Norman Spinrad himself recommended the collection for first-time readers of his work.

== Contents ==
- "Carcinoma Angels" (Dangerous Visions, 1967)
- "The Age of Invention" (F&SF 1966)
- "Outward Bound" (Analog 1964)
- "A Child of Mind" (Amazing 1965)
- "The Equalizer" (Analog 1964)
- "The Last of the Romany" (Analog 1963)
- "Technicality" (Analog 1966)
- "The Rules of the Road" (Galaxy 1964)
- "Dead End" (Galaxy 1969)
- "A Night in Elf Hill" (The Farthest Reaches 1968)
- "Deathwatch" (Playboy 1965)
- "The Ersatz Ego" (Amazing 1964)
- "Neutral Ground" (F&SF 1966)
- "Once More, with Feeling" (Knight 1969)
- "It’s a Bird! It’s a Plane!" (Gent 1967)
- "Subjectivity" (Analog 1964)
- "The Entropic Gang Bang Caper" (New Worlds 1969)
- "The Last Hurrah of the Golden Horde" (New Worlds 1969)

"The Ersatz Ego" was originally published as "Your Name Shall Be . . . Darkness."

== Reception ==
Reviewing the collection in Galaxy, Algis Budrys noted that "you become struck by Spinrad's breadth of awareness and by his ability to write a number of different styles well," but that "[Spinrad] never rises above the level of simple, straightforward competence." Budrys concluded that "alarmingly, it's taking Spinrad a very long time to stop synthesizing and start speaking with his own voice."
