= Druids (film) =

2001 film by Jacques Dorfmann

- French theatrical release poster
- French: Vercingétorix: La Légende du druide roi
- Directed by: Jacques Dorfmann
- Screenplay by: Rospo Pallenberg; Norman Spinrad; Jacques Dorfmann
- Story by: Jacques Dorfmann; Anne de Leseleuc
- Produced by: Jacques Dorfmann
- Starring: Christopher Lambert; Klaus Maria Brandauer; Max von Sydow; Inès Sastre; Maria Kavardjikova; Bernard-Pierre Donnadieu; Yannis Baraban
- Cinematography: Stefan Ivanov
- Edited by: Marie Castro
- Music by: Pierre Charvet
- Production companies: TF1 International; Eiffel Productions; Transfilm; La Mutualité Française; SMK Limited
- Distributed by: Lolistar
- Release dates: 14 January 2001 (France); 31 August 2001 (Canada)
- Running time: 124 minutes
- Countries: France; Belgium; Canada
- Language: English
- Budget: $15 million

Druids (French: Vercingétorix: La Légende du druide roi) is a 2001 epic historical drama film directed by Jacques Dorfmann. It stars Christopher Lambert, Klaus Maria Brandauer, Inés Sastre, Maria Kavardjikova, Bernard-Pierre Donnadieu, and Max von Sydow.

The film tells the story of the Gallic chieftain Vercingetorix, from his childhood through to his battle to save Gaul from Roman domination at the hands of Julius Caesar. The film culminates with the decisive Battle of Alesia.

The novel The Druid King by Norman Spinrad is a derivative work of an early version of the Druids script.

== Plot ==
In 60 B.C. Gaul, Druid chieftain Gutuart and his tribe witness the passing of a comet and interpret it as the sign of the coming of a new king for Gaul. Guttuart goes to Gergovia, the capital of the Arvernes tribe, for a gathering of chieftains. The young boy Vercingetorix, along with the young girl Eponia, sneak into the cavern where Celtill, Vercingetorix's father and chieftain of the Arvernes, hosts the meeting. Celtill intends to proclaim himself king of the Gauls, and as he shows off the crown once worn by the old kings, a disguised Roman spy shoots Celtill with an arrow. Gobanittio, Celtill's brother, places Celtill under arrest while the spy flees with the crown. Vercingetorix tries to reach his father, but Guttuart prevents the young boy from intervening and explains that destiny requires Celtill to meet his fate. The young Vercingetorix, watching his uncle burn his father alive, swears revenge.

Years later, the adult Vercingetorix continues to seek revenge against his uncle. He and Guttuart go to a road being built by the Romans, but Guttuart flees upon seeing the approach of Julius Caesar and his legionaries. Caesar acknowledges Vercingetorix as leader of the Arvernes, and invites him to participate in an invasion of Britain. Vercingetorix returns to Gergovia and avenges his father's death by killing Gobanittio, then tells his tribe of Caesar's offer to give one half of the booty if the tribe joins in the expedition to Britain. At Bibracte, capital of the Eduens tribe, various chieftains gather to hear Caesar speak of his invasion plan. Dumnorix, chieftain of the Eduens, is skeptical, so Caesar takes his children as hostages.

Vercingetorix is reunited with Eponia at a private meeting with Caesar, where Caesar reveals the crown of the kings of Gaul, and suggests that Rome choose Vercingetorix as king of the united tribes; Vercingetorix refuses, saying that the king should be chosen by destiny. When Dumnorix attacks a Roman garrison, Caesar orders Vercingetorix to capture him. Vercingetorix finds Dumnorix, who tells him that it was the Romans who orchestrated Celtill's death. Two Roman officers, who have been following Vercingetorix, kill Dumnorix. Vercingetorix kills one Roman and sends the other one back to Caesar, who learns that he has made an enemy rather than an ally.

Vercingetorix, after being elected as leader of the Arvernes at Gergovia, uses scorched earth tactics against the Romans. After Vercingetorix kills the garrison at Avaricum, Caesar orders the massacre of the Gallic inhabitants of Avaricum, then leads his army to Gergovia. The Eduens also arrive at Gergovia, but they abruptly end their alliance with Rome because of Caesar's massacre of Avaricum. Caesar curses all Gauls and retreats.

The Gallic chieftains elect Vercingetorix as commander-in-chief of a united Gallic army, while Caesar forms a pact with the fearsome Teutons at the Rhine River. Vercingetorix goes to Alesia but Caesar also arrives there with a large army to besiege the city. During this Battle of Alesia, the Romans quickly build a circle of siege-fortifications around the city, trapping Vercingetorix and his forces. Problems in the election of a commander for this Gallic relief army delays its arrival, but they finally reach the battleground. Vercingetorix orders the new force to surround the Romans, trapping them in a siege between the two Gallic forces. Caesar is aware that his army will starve to death, but destiny intervenes when the Gauls demand that Vercingetorix lead them into what they believe will be a decisive battle. Vercingetorix reluctantly agrees, and the Gallic warriors rush towards the Roman fortifications. The fortifications prove formidable, the Romans shoot volleys of arrows and javelins, and Caesar unleashes the Teutons into the battle. The Gauls are defeated, conquered by the Romans, and Vercingetorix lays down his weapons and kneels before Caesar.

The film ends with Guttuart's narration that Vercingetorix, imprisoned in Rome, was executed by order of Caesar; two years later, Caesar was assassinated on the Ides of March 44 B.C. on the steps of the Roman Senate.

== Cast ==
- Christopher Lambert as Vercingetorix
- Klaus Maria Brandauer as Julius Caesar
- Max von Sydow as Guttuart
- Inés Sastre as Eponia
- Denis Charvet as Cassivelaun
- Bernard-Pierre Donnadieu as Dumnorix
- Vincent Moscato as Moscatos
- Jean-Pierre Rives as Teuton Chief
- Maria Kavardjikova as Rhia
- Yannis Baraban as Litavic
- Jean-Pierre Bergeron as Diviciac

== Reception ==
The film was a critical and commercial failure. The production cost was $15 million, and the film was never widely released anywhere outside France. It is largely considered one of the worst French movies ever made.

The film's low budget, anachronistic costuming, poor writing, and lackluster acting were all cited as reasons for its box-office failure.

== See also ==
- List of historical drama films
- Gallic Wars
