= Little Heroes (novel) =

1987 novel by Norman Spinrad

- First edition cover
- Author: Norman Spinrad
- Cover artist: Todd Schorr
- Language: English
- Genre: Science fiction, dystopian
- Publisher: Bantam Books
- Publication date: 1987
- Publication place: United States
- Media type: Print (hardcover)
- Pages: 486 pp
- ISBN: 0-553-05207-1
- OCLC: 15198644

Little Heroes is a 1987 science fiction novel by American author Norman Spinrad.

== Plot ==
In the near-future, a music conglomerate called Muzik Inc. hires Glorianna O'Toole. Dubbed the "Crazy Old Lady of Rock and Roll", she never made it as a rock star but was present at rock and roll's creation. She, along with two young computer geniuses, goes on create a fleshless, Artificial Personality rock-and-roll star.
