= Mind Game (novel) =

- First edition
- Author: Christine Feehan
- Language: English
- Series: Ghostwalker
- Genre: Romance, paranormal, fantasy
- Publisher: Jove Books
- Publication date: 2004
- Publication place: United States
- Media type: Print (hardback & paperback)
- ISBN: 0-515-13809-6
- OCLC: 56018331
- LC Class: CPB Box no. 2257 vol. 14
- Preceded by: Shadow Game
- Followed by: Night Game

Mind Game is the second title in the Ghostwalker series of paranormal romance novels by Christine Feehan. It appeared in 15 bestseller lists including those of The New York Times, Publishers Weekly, and USA Today.

== Plot introduction ==
After being targeted by an assassin, Dahlia Le Blanc, a telekinetic who shirks the company of others, is forced to rely on the mysterious warrior Nicolas Trevane to protect her. She finds herself falling in love with despite not wholly trusting him.

== Awards and nominations ==
2004 Pearl Award

- Winner for Best Fantasy

2004 Hughey Award

- Winner for Best Other Paranormal Romance (witches, elves, magical powers, fantasy, etc.)

== See also ==
- Shadow Game
- Night Game
- Conspiracy Game
- Deadly Game
- Ghostwalker
