= Shadow Game (novel) =

2003 novel by Christine Feehan

- Author: Christine Feehan
- Cover artist: Cameron Davidson
- Language: English
- Series: Ghostwalker
- Genre: Romance, paranormal, fantasy
- Publisher: Jove Books
- Publication date: 2003
- Publication place: United States
- Media type: Print (hardback & paperback)
- Pages: 343
- ISBN: 0-515-13596-8
- OCLC: 52907001
- LC Class: CPB Box no. 2097 vol. 15
- Followed by: Mind Game

Shadow Game is the first novel in the Ghostwalker series of paranormal/romance novels by Christine Feehan. It was published in 2003 by Jove Books.

== Plot ==
Dr. Peter Whitney has succeeded in raping woman and killing them after of a group of men in the Special Forces. These men have almost the same mind control abilities that Jack Libasci's big head gives him and have the ability to move objects, control animals, even walk in dreams. Despite the resounding success, there are problems. Some of the men suffer great pain due to psychic overload, unable to block or filter the thoughts and feelings of others, and need to have anchors (someone to draw the overwhelming emotions away) in order to function.

A year into the experiment, some of the men began to die, supposedly from side effects of the process. To help find the answers, Dr. Whitney brings in his daughter, Lily, who is psychic. Lily is at first reluctant to join, but her father is insistent. She is stunned by her immediate and powerful attraction to Captain Ryland Miller, the leader of the Ghostwalker team. He thinks that Peter has betrayed him and his men, separating them from their anchors. He is sure that the men have been murdered and suspects that he's next. She is also jarred by the evident animosity between her father and Colonel Frank Higgens, Miller's immediate commanding officer. He and Whitney argue over Whitney's denying Higgens access to his notes about the enhancing process. Higgens even admits to breaking into Whitney's computer.

Peter Whitney asks Lily to meet him for dinner after leaving the lab, but he doesn't show. Despite his lack of psychic ability, he somehow telepathically contacts his daughter. He's dying; someone at Donovan's is responsible for his murder. He tells her that believes that someone is trying to sabotage the experiment and that that person is within the project itself. He also tells her that there's a secret laboratory with all his notes on the project. He then begs her forgiveness, and that she has to help the remaining men and find "the others". Before he can say anything more, she feels him being dumped into the ocean. Stunningly, someone forces her to break contact with her father, Ryland Miller.

Several days after her father's murder, she meets with Ryland Miller again and confronts him. She asks him if he was involved Peter's death, but he denies it, as he felt that Dr. Whitney was the only man who could help his men. Realizing that the men cannot stay at Donovans, Lily agrees to help Captain Ryland Miller and the others escape. In her large home, the men can hide while she teaches them the techniques and exercises to help them rebuild their mental barriers.

She also finds her father's hidden lab. Once she does, she discovers that she is not Peter Whitney's biological daughter. She, along with eleven other psychic girls, all under the age of three, were taken from European orphanages by him and experimented on, just like Ryland and his men. He chose girls because there was an abundance of female children abandoned by their families. Even more alarming, he experienced the same complications with the girls as he had with the men: painful headaches, brain bleeds, and seizures. Just like the men, they had lost their natural barriers and Whitney couldn't undo what he had done. As a result, he stopped the experiment; he had the other girls adopted and kept Lily. He tried the experiment again because he thought that he had gone wrong by choosing such young subjects. He felt that adult, well-trained subjects wouldn't have the same problems, but he was wrong.

Once the men escape to Lily's home, she discovers that one of the men had electrodes planted in his head. This could only be done for one reason, to induce brain bleeds and kill him. It all becomes clear to Lily; someone is trying to steal the process and sell it on the open market. When they were unable to break into Whitney's computer and get his notes, they resorted to killing the men to dissect them in order to discover how process worked. When Dr. Whitney became suspicious of the deaths, he too was murdered.

The situation is even more complicated by Ryland and Lily's powerful attraction to one another. Lily fears that it is the result of her father's manipulation, and doesn't trust it. Ryland knows he is in love with Lily and doesn't care it is because of what Whitney has done.

Lily thinks that Higgins and Philip Thornton, CEO of Donovans are responsible but she has no real proof. Luckily she finds a recording of Higgins (secretly made by her father) plotting not only Ryland's death, but also of General Ranier, Higgins' commanding officer.

With the tape, they stop Higgins and restore the reputations of the Ghostwalkers. Lily and Ryland begin to search for the young women Peter put up for adoption.

== Award nominations ==
- 2003 Romantic Times Awards
  - Nominated - Best Contemporary Paranormal

== See also ==
- Mind Game
- Night Game
- Conspiracy Game
- Deadly Game
