= Child of Fortune =

1985 novel by Norman Spinrad

- The cover of the first edition
- Author: Norman Spinrad
- Cover artist: Yee Chea Lin
- Language: English
- Genre: Science fiction novel
- Publisher: Bantam Books
- Publication date: 1985
- Publication place: United States
- Media type: Print (hardcover, paperback)
- Pages: 467 (hardcover)
- ISBN: 978-0-7653-0155-0
- Preceded by: The Void Captain's Tale

Child of Fortune is a 1985 science fiction novel by the American author Norman Spinrad. Like his previous book The Void Captain's Tale, Child of Fortune takes place three or four thousand years in the future in an era called the Second Starfaring Age. It is a coming of age story about a young girl's wanderjahr, a rite of passage that all adolescents in the Second Starfaring Age are expected to undertake before they become adults. Critical reaction to the book was mixed, with some critics dissatisfied with Spinrad's long ornate polyglot writing. Others were more positive, finding the difficult language worth the effort.

== Plot ==
The book is presented as an autobiographical tale, CHILD OF FORTUNE, A Historie of the Second Starfaring Age by Wendi Shasta Leonardo, and it includes an introduction written by the fictional narrator. Adolescents in the Second Starfaring Age are expected to embark on a journey of self-discovery called a wanderjahr, "the eternal journey from childhood to maturity through the wondrous and terrible chaos of the region between." The wanderers are known as "Children of Fortune", and their culture contains elements of the carnivalesque and 1960s flower Children. The wanderjahr is typically a fairly long journey that only ends when the wanderer adopts her adult name (her freenom) and chooses her life's work. Some never complete this rite of passage, and remain Children of Fortune their whole lives. The novel is the story of Wendi Shasta Leonardo's wanderjahr.

The story begins when Wendi (known by her childhood name Moussa) leaves her home planet, Glade, with only a return ticket home, a small amount of spending money, and a sex-enhancing ring. She travels to the planet-sized city of Edoku, where she quickly burns through all her money and becomes a mendicant. She is adopted by a group of Children of Fortune known as the Gypsy Jokers. Moussa falls in love with the leader of the Gypsy Jokers, Pater Pan, who teaches her the art of ruespieling (story-telling) and gives her the name Sunshine.

After the abrupt disappearance of Pater Pan, Sunshine leaves Edoku with a wealthy Child of Fortune named Guy Vlad Boca. They sample the hedonistic life of the Honored Passengers aboard the interstellar Void Ships and eventually arrive on the planet Belshazaar.

On Belshazzar, there is a large forest known as the Bloomenwald, which is the source of a plethora of naturally occurring psychedelic drugs. The trees use intoxicants to induce mammals to perform pollination duties, and many Children of Fortune are trapped by the forest ecosystem. Through her force of will, Sunshine is able to lead a group back to reality. This becomes the basis for her first original composition as a ruespieler, "The Pied Piper of the Bloomenwald".

Sunshine's tale attracts the attention of an author who convinces her to go find Pater Pan, so that the story will have an ending. Sunshine finds Pater Pan addicted to the Charge, a kind of electronic drug. As he is dying, she experiences his entire life story in a kind of ecstatic vision. Sunshine ends her wanderjahr and adopts the freenom Wendi.

== Style and themes ==
In a 1999 interview, Spinrad spoke about his use of language in his "far-future" novels, Child of Fortune and The Void Captain's Tale: "In these books, people speak this kind of mélange language of human languages, to the point where everybody speaks their own dialect of this common language – their own sprach of lingo, I call it. I hasten to say, these books are at least 80% in English! But in Void Captain's Tale, the starship captain speaks a more Germanic form, and in Child of Fortune it's more latinate and Italian."

Critic Wendy Erisman saw Child of Fortune as a work of utopian science fiction. Spinrad's wanderjahr is a prototypical rite of passage that takes place in three stages: separation, margin, and reintegration. Traditional "stagnant" utopias are based on oppressive social controls, but the freedom or the "margin" phase of the wanderjahr "becomes an impetus for creativity and social change" that allows young people to take their place in a constantly evolving utopia.

Spinrad has called the book "an Anarchist novel, because there's no government".

== Criticism ==
In The Globe and Mail, book reviewer H. Kirchhoff felt that "[f]or all its invention and flash, the book is irretrievably marred by Spinrad's arch, self-consciously ornate language." A common criticism was that the book was too long and "overblown". A short review in the Los Angeles Times was guardedly positive: "Entertaining if you read it in long stretches, but picking up the rhythm of the in-house jargon, a pastiche of German, French, Spanish and Hindu (I believe) takes some getting used to." The New York Times was also mostly positive, stating that the difficult language was "worth the effort".
