= Dark Guardian (novel) =

2002 novel by Christine Feehan

- First edition
- Author: Christine Feehan
- Cover artist: John Ennis
- Language: English
- Series: Dark Series
- Genre: Romance, paranormal, fantasy
- Publisher: Leisure Books
- Publication date: 2002
- Publication place: United States
- Media type: Print (hardback & paperback), audio (MP3, CD & Cassette)
- Pages: 348 pp. (US paperback)
- Preceded by: Dark Legend
- Followed by: Dark Symphony

Dark Guardian is a paranormal/suspense novel written by American author Christine Feehan. Published in 2002, it is the 9th book in the Dark Series, and focuses on Jaxon Montgomery and Lucian Daratrazanoff.

== Plot summary ==
Jaxon Montgomery has spent nearly her entire life as the obsession of a sick serial killer. From a young age she was always exceptional and as the daughter of a Navy SEAL she was provided the best training available. Her father's best friend, Tyler Drake, however, believed that her father did not care about her enough and killed him in order to take his place as her step-father. After her father's death her mother became a junkie, leaving her to care for her younger brother. She finds it odd that Tyler treats her with so much love and respect yet seems hateful to her family. When Tyler finally snaps he kills her mother and her younger brother and as a highly trained Navy SEAL he avoids all capture. Whenever she is sent to another foster home, Tyler once again shows up and kills the family, and then disappears once more. She spends her life paranoid of showing any emotion and caring toward anyone, lest she set off Tyler's murderous habits.

Jaxon, unable to join the SEALS because she is a woman, instead becomes a cop. She lives her life without any attachments, forever on the look out for Tyler, but someone else this time has their eye on her. He is Lucian, one of the oldest Carpathian hunters still in existence. He has come to claim Jaxon as his lifemate and after he saves her life during a drug bust, he takes it upon himself to protect her. She is drawn to Lucian, which only frightens her for she believes that will get him killed. Little does she know that he is from an ancient species with powers she has never seen.

== Awards and nominations ==
- Winner for the 2002 PEARL Award for Best Overall Paranormal
- Honorable Mention for the 2002 PEARL Award for Best Shapeshifter
- Winner for 2002 Golden Rose Readers Choice Award from Love Romances for Best Paranormal
- Winner for 2002 Golden Rose Readers Choice Award from Love Romances for Best Vampire Romance
- Winner for 2002 Waldenbooks Bestselling Paranormal (tied with Lair of the Lion)
