= The Mind Game =

1980 novel by Norman Spinrad

First edition (publ. Jove Books)

The Mind Game is a novel by Norman Spinrad published in 1980.

== Plot summary ==
The Mind Game is a novel in which the wife of a television director joins a religious cult, Transformationalism.

== Reception ==
Greg Costikyan reviewed The Mind Game in Ares Magazine #6 and commented that "it is a gripping, tense thriller to which these ideas form an intricate backdrop."

Dave Pringle reviewed The Mind Game (as The Process) for Imagine magazine, and stated that "This is an angry book, full of ambition, frustration, and depictions of torrid sex. It is overwritten and overlong, as all Spinrad's novels are, but it packs an unavoidable punch."

== Reviews ==
Review by Andrew M. Andrews (1985) in Fantasy Review, August 1985
