= Mind Games (Champions) =

Role-playing game supplement

Mind Games is a 1989 role-playing game supplement published by Hero Games for Champions.

== Contents ==
Mind Games details the evil Parapsychological Studies Institute.

== Reception ==
Mind Games was reviewed in Space Gamer Vol. II No. 2. The reviewer commented that "This has all the psychic psupervillains psuperheroes can swallow. Buy it. Its the best from Hero Games since Strike Force."

== Reviews ==
- Dragon #162
- Alarums & Excursions (Issue 175 - Mar 1990)
