= Dark Destiny =

2004 novel by Christine Feehan

- First edition
- Author: Christine Feehan
- Language: English
- Series: Dark Series
- Genre: Romance, paranormal, fantasy
- Publisher: Leisure Books
- Publication date: 2004
- Publication place: United States
- Media type: Print (hardback & paperback)
- Pages: 383 pp (US paperback)
- ISBN: 0843950501
- Preceded by: Dark Melody
- Followed by: Dark Hunger

Dark Destiny is a paranormal/suspense novel written by American author Christine Feehan. Published in 2004, it is the 13th book in her Dark Series.

== Plot summary ==
As a young girl, Destiny unknowingly let a vampire into her home, who then slaughtered her family and held her captive, forcing her to become like him. During this time she was able to connect with another being who was able to guide her in her abilities to defeat the vampire who held her captive. Even though defeated the blood of the vampire still lives inside her, burning and calling to other vampires. She uses this calling card to slay vampires in the city of Seattle, a place she has laid claim to protect from the vile creatures. All the while she believes herself to be evil, just as the vampire who tortured her was, but the voice of the mysterious being claims she is instead like him, a Carpathian. She believes herself responsible for the death of her family and therefore refuses to put her trust in him.

Nicolae is an ancient Carpathian hunter who was almost lost to the darkness, but then he connected with a scared female child. He tried to aid her but she was too mistrusting to even speak to him. With her unwilling to trust him, he instead sent her his ancient knowledge he had gained from hunting vampires for centuries to help aid her. For years he has searched for her, believing that their connection must be caused because she is his lifemate, but she still refuses to trust him.

Finally, in Seattle he has found her and intends to claim her. Destiny is distraught because she believes that he is vampire, which she has vowed to destroy all who come to Seattle, yet she hesitates to break their strange connection that has been her only lifeline. Destiny must deal with what she really is and put away the past, all while fighting to keep the city safe. With the help of Nicolae's love she can finally be free from the vampires taint and be whole once more.

== Main characters ==
- Nicolae
- Destiny

== Awards and nominations ==
- New York Times Bestseller List
- USA Today Bestseller List
- B Dalton Bestseller List
- Barnes & Noble Bestseller List
- Barnes & Noble Online Bestseller List
- Barnes & Noble Best of 2004 Staff Favorites Bestseller List
- Amazon Bestseller List
- Publishers Weekly Bestseller List
- Sirenbooks Bestseller List
- Walmart Bestseller List
- Waldenbooks Bestseller List
