= Songs from the Stars =

1980 novel by Norman Spinrad

First edition (publ. Simon & Schuster)

Songs from the Stars is a novel by Norman Spinrad published in 1980.

== Plot summary ==
Songs from the Stars is a novel in which Clear Blue Lou and Sunshine Sue help manage the society of Aquaria, the only earth-based human civilization that survived a devastating nuclear war. However, the technocratic Space Systems Inc has also survived in Earth orbit and schemes to displace the technological stasis in which they perceive Aquaria to have lingered in order to resurrect spaceflight on this post-apocalyptic world.

== Reception ==
Kirkus Reviews states "Debates on communications and karma ensue. Gassy."

Tom Easton reviewed Songs from the Stars for Analog Science Fiction/Science Fact, and commented that "I enjoyed Songs, and I believe it should be read widely. Spinrad has split human life into technophilia and technophobia, and effectively dramatized the necessity of reconciling the two if anyone is to have a life of freedom and comfort."

Greg Costikyan reviewed Songs from the Stars in Ares Magazine #8 and commented that "Whatever dialectical disagreements one may have with Spinrad's themes, Songs from the Stars shows once again that he is an extremely powerful writer – among the best science fiction has to offer."

== Reviews ==
- Review by Algis Budrys (1981) in The Magazine of Fantasy & Science Fiction, January 1981
- Review by Tom Staicar (1981) in Amazing Stories, January 1981
- Review by Theodore Sturgeon (1981) in Rod Serling's The Twilight Zone Magazine, June 1981
- Review by Paul Kincaid (1981) in Vector 103
