= Dark Challenge =

2000 novel by Christine Feehan

- First edition
- Author: Christine Feehan
- Language: English
- Series: Dark Series
- Genre: Romance, paranormal, fantasy
- Publisher: Love Spell
- Publication date: 2000
- Publication place: United States
- Media type: Print (hardback & paperback)
- Pages: 368 (US paperback)
- ISBN: 0-505-52409-0
- OCLC: 45295904
- LC Class: CPB Box no. 1925 vol. 2
- Preceded by: Dark Magic
- Followed by: Dark Fire

Dark Challenge is the fifth book in the paranormal romance series Dark Series by American author Christine Feehan. It is the first book in a trilogy written within the Dark Series, and it starts several months after the events in Dark Magic.

== Plot summary ==
Julian Savage, the twin brother of Aidan (Dark Gold), is sent to warn a young singer, Desari, that she and her band have come under suspicion by a fanatical vampire hunting society. Believing this to be his last task to his Prince, Mikhail, Julian was prepared to greet the dawn and his own destruction. Upon hearing the singer's hauntingly beautiful voice, however, he was mesmerized. The colours he hadn't seen in over eight hundred years were now vivid and bright. Julian instantly knew he had found his lifemate because of his ability to see in colour, accompanied by the return of emotions.

While he revels in his discovery, gunfire rings out on stage. Julian rushes in to find three of the band members, including Desari, lying amongst blood-spattered instruments. To save her life, Julian heals her wounds and provides her with a large volume of his blood, while performing the ritual to bind Desari to him. Weak from blood loss, he is surprised by a huge panther. To counter the attack, he in turn shape-shifts into a large, golden leopard. The two cats seemed evenly matched until the arrival of two more leopards. With these unfavourable odds, Julian makes good on his escape, deciding to hunt down the assassins. To his puzzlement, he finds all six of the humans slaughtered in a Carpathian fashion. Julian gathers the bodies, reduces them to ashes and scatters them into the ocean in an effort to throw off the vampire hunting society.

As Julian courts Desari, he and Desari's older brother, Darius, test each other's strengths. Meanwhile, Julian's lifelong enemy hunts his lifemate. In light of a common goal, the two Carpathian men strike an uneasy truce to destroy the vampire.

== Awards ==
2000 PEARL Awards

- Honorable Mention - Best Shape-Shifter
- Finalist - Best Overall Paranormal Romance

Dark Challenge appeared in several bestseller lists: USA Today, Waldenbooks, Amazon, Siren Books, and Wal-Mart.

2000 Francis Awards

- Finalist - Other paranormal

2000 All About Romance Awards

- Finalist - Favorite Other Romance

2000 RBL Hughie Book Awards

- Best Paranormal Romance
