= Dark Curse =

2008 novel by Christine Feehan

- First edition
- Author: Christine Feehan
- Cover artist: Larry Rostant
- Language: English
- Series: Dark Series
- Genre: Romance, paranormal, fantasy
- Publisher: Berkley Books
- Publication date: September 2, 2008
- Publication place: United States
- Media type: Print (hardback and paperback)
- Pages: 416 pp (US paperback)
- ISBN: 978-0-515-14699-8
- Preceded by: Dark Possession
- Followed by: Dark Slayer

Dark Curse is a 2008 dark fantasy vampire novel written by American author Christine Feehan, and a part of the Dark Series saga.

== Plot introduction ==
Lara Calladine is an expert in the study of ice caves. As a child she was kept prisoner by Razvan, her father and Xavier, her great-grandfather, and used as a blood source. With the help of her aunts she was able to escape the ice caves into the world above. Years later, Lara searches for the cave of her nightmares in an effort to rescue her aunts. Finally she believes she has found what she is looking for in the Carpathian mountains.

Nicolas De La Cruz has come to the Carpathian mountains on one last mission to give information to the Prince of the Carpathian race. Afterwards, he intends to seek the dawn and commit suicide. The darkness in his soul has nearly completely taken over and he wants to end things before he turns into one of the very creatures he has hunted and killed for centuries, each kill worsening the situation.

In the midst of discovering the cave, Lara's companions are injured and she seeks the shelter of the local inn. There she meets Nicholas whose inner demons have finally won, as he attempts to kill her. She thwarts his attack and he is able to regain his sanity, along with the knowledge that she is his lifemate.

Even though Lara, naturally, distrusts Nicolas he will stop at nothing to possess her. As they seek to free her aunts from their confinement and along the way they discover a malicious plot set in motion centuries earlier by Xavier which has been slowly destroying the Carpathian people. Together they can save the Carpathians from extinction and create a passion and love so fierce it can break a dark curse.

== Awards and nominations ==
The novel appeared in several bestseller lists:

- New York Times #1 Bestseller List
- USA Today Bestseller List
- Publishers Weekly Bestseller List
- Barnes & Noble Mass Market Bestseller List
- Bookscan Bestseller List
- Borders Bestseller List
- Amazon Bestseller List
- Walmart Bestseller List
- Boston Glob Bestseller List
- Washington Post Bestseller List
- Wall Street Journal Bestseller List
