= Lair of the Lion =

- First edition
- Author: Christine Feehan
- Language: English
- Genre: Romance, paranormal, fantasy
- Publisher: Dorchester Publishing
- Publication date: 2002
- Publication place: United States
- Media type: Print (hardback & paperback)
- Pages: 384 pp (US paperback)
- ISBN: 0-8439-5048-X
- OCLC: 50512788
- LC Class: CPB Box no. 1987 vol. 16

Lair of the Lion is a paranormal/romance novel written by American author Christine Feehan. Unlike most of her other works, this novel is not part of an ongoing series and isn't set in the present day. Lair of the Lion is set in Italy.

== Plot summary ==
Isabella Vernaducci is a young aristocratic woman desperate to save her imprisoned brother. He has been falsely accused of treason and is slated to be executed within the month. She feels she has one chance to save him, the powerful Don DeMarco. The Don is respected and feared throughout the land, and is said that he is gifted with strange powers. She makes the arduous journey to his isolated palazzo.

Once she is granted an audience with the Don and explains her plight, he agrees to help her on one condition: she must become his wife. Stunned but relieved, she agrees, and the plans are set into motion. For all her joy at saving her brother, there are powerful undercurrents of unease. It is said that there is a curse on the DeMarcos, that all marriages are doomed to fail, end in betrayal and murder.

== Awards and nominations ==
2002 Golden Rose Readers' Choice Award at Love Romance

- Won - Best Shapeshifter

2002 Romantic Times Reviewer's Choice Award

- Won - Best Historical Paranormal Fantasy
