= Norman Spinrad =

American science fiction writer and critic (born 1940)

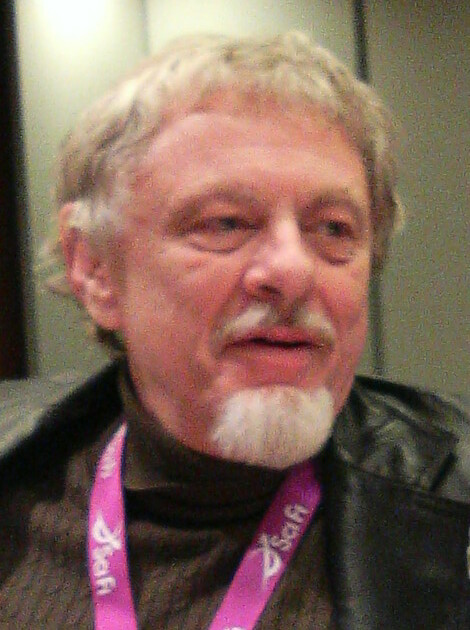
- Spinrad in 2006
- Born: September 15, 1940 (age 86); New York City, U.S.
- Education: City College of New York (BS)
- Occupation: Novelist
- Spouse: N. Lee Wood (m. 1990; div. 2005)
- Writing career
- Genre: Science fiction

Norman Richard Spinrad (born September 15, 1940) is an American science fiction author, essayist, and critic. His fiction has won the Prix Apollo and been nominated for numerous awards, including the Hugo Award and multiple Nebula Awards.

== Personal life ==
Born in New York City, Spinrad is a graduate of the Bronx High School of Science. In 1957 he entered City College of New York and graduated in 1961 with a Bachelor of Science degree as a pre-law major. He has lived in San Francisco, Los Angeles, London, Paris, and New York City. He married fellow novelist N. Lee Wood in 1990; they divorced in 2005. Spinrad served as President of the Science Fiction and Fantasy Writers of America (SFWA) from 1980 to 1982 and again from 2001 to 2002. He has also worked as a phone-in radio show host, a vocal artist, a literary agent, and President of World SF.

In an interview with Locus magazine in 1999, Spinrad described himself as an "anarchist" and a "syndicalist".

== Style ==
Some critics have noted utopian themes in Spinrad's works. In a 1999 interview, he talked about his hopes for the role of science fiction in society:

How much science fiction is being published now that's set in worlds that are better than ours? Not that have bigger shopping malls or faster space ships, but where the characters are morally superior, where the society works better, is more just? Not many. It becomes difficult to do it, and that's a feedback relationship with what's happening in the culture, with science fiction being the minor note. People don't credit it anymore! Not just better gizmos and more virtual reality gear, but better societies. People don't believe the future will be a better place. And that is very scary.

According to critic Galen Strickland, "Spinrad has never taken the easy course of artistic repetition, nor tailored his thoughts to the dictates of any editor. Each of his books is unique, and explores avenues of thought and speculation few others have traveled. Sex and power are usually his primary themes". Consciousness-altering drugs often feature prominently in his stories. According to Spinrad:

If there's one gaping void in the story of American literary history in the second half of the twentieth century as currently promulgated, it's the influence of grass and psychedelic drugs, not only on the lives of writers, but on the content of what's been written, and on the form and style too. It's hard to be critically or biographically courageous when so much creative work was done under the influences of jailable offenses.

== Controversies ==
Spinrad had difficulty finding a publisher willing to print Bug Jack Barron as a book. Publisher Michael Moorcock printed the novel in installments in the magazine New Worlds. The newsstand company WHSmith refused to distribute one of the issues because of the installment of Spinrad's novel. The Arts Council of Great Britain, which subsidized New Worlds, put public pressure on WHSmith and forced the company to distribute the issue. This led to denunciations of Spinrad, The Arts Council, and New Worlds in the British Parliament.

Spinrad could not find an American publisher for his 2007 novel Osama the Gun. "[O]ne rejection letter, foaming at the mouth, declared that no American publisher would touch it." He decided to self-publish the novel as an e-book. The book, which features several scenes set in Paris, has been published in French by Fayard as Oussama (2011).

== Major works ==
An early edition cover of The Solarians

=== The Solarians ===
The Solarians (1966), was Spinrad's first published novel. Unlike Spinrad's controversial later work, this novel is a mainstream space opera featuring space battles, faster-than-light spacedrives, and an alien enemy of humanity, the Duglaari. The plot of the novel concerns a fleet commander named Palmer who makes contact with a self-isolated human clan, in possession of Earth, race called the Solarians, who emerge to help humanity in its long war against the Duglaari. Through subterfuge, the Solarians convince the computationally perfect Duglaari that Sol is a threat. The Duglaari attack our solar system, but are caught by a gambit where Sol is destroyed and the Duglaari diminished so that humanity remains.

=== Bug Jack Barron ===
Bug Jack Barron (1969), a pre-cyberpunk tale of a cynical, exploitative talk-show host who gradually uncovers a conspiracy concerning an immortality treatment and the methods used in that treatment, was serialised in the British magazine New Worlds during Michael Moorcock's editorship. With its explicit language and cynical attitude to politicians, it roused one British Member of Parliament's ire at the magazine's partial funding by the British Arts Council.

=== The Iron Dream ===
The Iron Dream (1972) is an alternate history novel, the bulk of which is the middle part consisting of a fictional fantasy classic entitled Lord of the Swastika, written by Adolf Hitler, who took up science fiction after failing as a politician. The first part explains that the deceased author Hitler was a science-fiction writer and that this novel was widely praised by fandom. The third part is a critical review of the novel and its aftermath. According to Spinrad, the book was banned for twenty-five years in Germany, but was finally exonerated after appeals. More accurately, the book was indexed by the Federal Department for Media Harmful to Young Persons, thus the sale of the book was permitted, but the public display of the book or its covers was prohibited, despite the fact that there were no swastikas on the cover of the first German edition. The Iron Dream won a Prix Tour-Apollo Award, and was nominated for an American Book Award.

=== A World Between ===
A World Between (1979) tells of a mildly turbulent period on the planet of Pacifica, a utopic, democratic electronically mediated society, on which lands a ship from each of the two factions in the "Pink and Blue War": the patronizingly paternalistic Institute of Transcendental Science on the one side, and the rabidly man-hating lesbian Femocrats on the other. Nobody suffers a worse fate than political embarrassment, and status quo is restored by the simple fact of Pacifican society being better than that of either of the off-world factions.

=== The Void Captain's Tale ===
The Void Captain's Tale (1983) takes place three or four thousand years in the future in an era called the Second Starfaring Age, a setting Spinrad revisited in the 1985 novel Child of Fortune. The book contains elements of confession, love story, eroticism, and horror.

=== Child of Fortune ===
Child of Fortune (1985) deals with the adventures of a young woman, Moussa, in her search for her true calling. In Moussa's culture, young people of her age and class undertake a wanderjahr during which they wander from planet to planet, free to go wherever and do whatever they wish. While on their travels they are known as Children of Fortune, and are treated with indulgence and kindness by most in memory of their own wanderjahr. The Children of Fortune blend elements of gypsies, hippies of 1960s America, and other groups and legends, including Peter Pan. While some parents give their children a great deal of money for the trip, Moussa's parents believe that she will learn more with a true wanderjahr rather than a subsidized tour, so they give her little but a voucher for a one-way ticket home. Moussa becomes a "ruespieler" or storyteller, and takes the name "Wendy" in honor of Pater Pan, the man she meets, loves, and loses during her wanderjahr. The wanderjahr bears a superficial resemblance to the Grand Tour which many upper-class young men undertook after finishing school, the difference being that Children of Fortune are expected to have explored themselves as well as the world during their travels, and to come home knowing who they are and what place they want for themselves.

=== The Druid King ===
The Druid King (2003) is a historical novel about the conflict between Vercingetorix and the Roman Empire.

== Film and television ==
Spinrad wrote the script for an episode of the original Star Trek television series, titled "The Doomsday Machine" (1967). This episode was nominated for a Hugo Award. He also wrote an unproduced Star Trek script for Star Trek: Phase II, and episodes for Land of the Lost and Werewolf.

He has been credited as a writer on two feature films, The Red Siren and Druids. Universal Pictures bought the film rights to Bug Jack Barron, and Costa-Gavras was slated to direct. Harlan Ellison wrote an early version of the script, but the movie was never made.

== Bibliography ==
=== Novels ===
- The Solarians (1966)
- Agent of Chaos (1967)
- The Men in the Jungle (1967)
- Bug Jack Barron (1969)
- The Iron Dream (1972)
- Passing Through the Flame (1975)
- A World Between (1979)
- Songs from the Stars (1980)
- The Mind Game (1980)
- The Void Captain's Tale (1983)
- Riding the Torch (1984)
- Child of Fortune (1985)
- Little Heroes (1987)
- The Children of Hamelin (1991)
- Russian Spring (1991)
- Deus X (1993)
- Pictures at 11 (1994)
- Vampire Junkies (1994)
- Journals of the Plague Years (1995)
- Greenhouse Summer (1999)
- He Walked Among Us (2003)
- The Druid King (2003)
- Mexica (2005)
- Osama the Gun (2011)
- The People's Police (2017)

=== Short fiction ===
Collections

- The Last Hurrah of the Golden Horde (1970)
- No Direction Home (1975)
- The Star-Spangled Future (1979)
- Other Americas (1988)
- Deus X and Other Stories (2003)

Stories (Note: Short stories unless otherwise noted.)

- Up and Out (2023)

=== Teleplays ===
- "The Doomsday Machine" (Star Trek: The Original Series)
- "Tag Team" (Land of the Lost)
- "Grey Wolf" (Werewolf)

=== Non-fiction ===
- Fragments of America (2013)
- Science Fiction in the Real World. Carbondale, Illinois: Southern Illinois University Press, 1990.
