= Conspiracy Game =

2006 novel by Christine Feehan

- First edition book cover
- Author: Christine Feehan
- Series: Ghostwalker
- Genre: Paranormal romance
- Publisher: Penguin Group
- Publication date: November 1, 2006
- ISBN: 978-0-515-14216-7
- Preceded by: Night Game
- Followed by: Deadly Game

Conspiracy Game is the fourth title in the Ghostwalker series of paranormal romance novels by Christine Feehan, published in 2006 by Penguin Group.

== Plot summary ==
Jack Norton, one of a group of Navy SEALs that were psychically and physically enhanced by Dr. Peter Whitney, called Ghostwalkers, is on a mission to the Democratic Republic of the Congo to rescue his twin brother, Ken from rebel forces. Ken had led a team sent to save an American senator whose plane had gone down, but Ken himself was then captured and tortured before he was retrieved. When he rescued his brother, Jack too was captured, but was able to escape.

Briony Jenkins takes a walk in the jungle, despite the danger of encountering rebel forces. She is a member of a circus family, called the Flying Five, but she has always been different, as she cannot be around people without feeling constant pain. She is also stronger and faster than either of her four brothers.

Jack encounters Briony while hiding in the jungle, and is immediately aware that she is a Ghostwalker like himself. He is also stunned by his powerful attraction to her. Briony in turn is amazed that even with his numerous injuries, she cannot feel his pain nor hear his thoughts; it is the first time that has ever happened. She is also surprised to learn that Jack knows her older brother Jebediah, having served with him when Jeb was a SEAL.

Briony is able to get Jack to her hotel and treat his wounds. The next day, Jeb arrives and is at first stunned then alarmed to see Jack with his sister. Jack has always had a formidable reputation, and he is surprised that his sister seems comfortable in his presence. Jeb agrees to help Jack, and suggest he hides in the arena where they have been permitted to practice. Throughout the next few days as Jack waits to be picked up by his people, the attraction and intimacy between him and Briony grows. When it is time to leave, Jack coolly informs her that he doesn't want to continue their relationship.

Almost three months later, Briony discovers that she is pregnant. Before she can get over that shock, her doctor tries to drug her and kidnap her. She and her brother escape and go on the run. Twice more enhanced soldiers find her and try to "return her to the lab". Then a man calling himself Kaden Montague appears and shows her a file of her life. The story told to her adoptive family is a lie; she is not the daughter of a man whose wife died in childbirth. She is one of several orphaned girls who have been psychically and physically enhanced by a man named Peter Whitney. She was given to her family because he wanted to see if she was tough enough to survive the constant bombardment of human emotion without an anchor (a psychic who can filter strong emotion). Not only that, but the overwhelming attraction between Jack and Briony is no accident. Whitney designed pheromones that would insure strong physical compatibility. All he needed to do was get them both at the same place at the time and nature would take care of the rest. All of this was done so that Briony and Jack would be the parents of the second generation of Whitney's supersoldiers.

Briony knows that she can't remain with her family; as her pregnancy advances, she will be less able to defend herself. She turns to the one person who might be able to protect her and her unborn child, Jack Norton.

When Briony and Jeb appear on the doorstep of Jack and his twin brother's remote cabin, he is stunned by her revelation that she is pregnant. He is even more surprised by the information that not only is Whitney still alive, but he is also plotting to kidnap Briony. Somewhat to even Briony's surprise, he agrees to protect her and the baby. It is not all good news however, as the attraction manufactured by Whitney is intense and stronger than before.

As they spend time together, Briony realizes that Jack is not the "badass" he purports to be, but a man shattered by an abusive and painful childhood. His own father killed his mother and tried to kill him and his brother because of his intense jealousy. Jack has always feared that he too would be like that if he were ever to fall in love.

Just as Jack and Briony reach this new understanding, the house comes under attack. Whitney's men have found her again. Briony realizes that the only way they could be tailing her is with a tracking devise. She finds and removes it. She also makes another revelation; she remembers that she has a twin sister, a fact that Luther, one of the men sent to reacquire her confirms. Luckily, Jack and Ken are able to fight off the soldiers until they can be rescued by their comrades.

Both Jack and Ken pledge to help find Briony find her sister, Mari.

== Awards ==
In 2003, Conspiracy Game was nominated for the Romantic Times Award for Best Contemporary Paranormal.
