= Dark Magic (novel) =

- First edition
- Author: Christine Feehan
- Language: English
- Series: Dark Series
- Genre: Romance, paranormal, fantasy
- Publisher: Love Spell
- Publication date: 2000
- Media type: Print (hardback & paperback)
- Pages: 368 (US paperback)
- ISBN: 0-505-52389-2
- OCLC: 44587855
- LC Class: CPB Box no. 1984 vol. 12
- Preceded by: Dark Gold
- Followed by: Dark Challenge

Dark Magic is the fourth book in Christine Feehan's Dark Series. It takes place within a few months of the events in Dark Gold. It was published in July 2000.

== Background ==
Gregori, often called the Dark One, knows he is very close to turning into a monster. He has always known that a child of Mikhail will be his lifemate, so when Raven, Mikhail's lifemate, is attacked (in Dark Prince) he gives her his blood to build a bond between them. Raven is attacked again (in Dark Desire) while she carries the baby, and Gregori gives blood to the fetus, even communicates with it, further sealing the bond between him and the child.

When Savannah comes of age, she refuses to mate with Gregori out of fear. Knowing he will dominate her life once he takes her, he gives her five years of freedom before he claims her. Savannah goes to America and becomes an illusionist, but this promise costs him dearly. In case he turns vampire, he appeals to Aidan not to hunt him alone, but to get his brother Julian to join him. After Gregori said this he told Aidan that he would "go to ground" (when a Carpathian shuts down heart and lungs in order to sleep in soil).

== Plot ==
The five-year period has passed; Gregori has come to San Francisco, where Savannah has ended her tour to claim her. The bombardment of new emotions prevents him from detecting the presence of a vampire. Before he can stop it, the vampire kills Savannah's friend Peter and attempts to claim her for himself. Gregori is forced to kill him in front of her. Savannah still refuses to bond with him, but Gregori informs her that there is no choice for either of them.

Knowing that she is in shock and grief because of her friend, he takes her to his property to heal, intending to complete the mating ritual the next day, but their closeness is too powerful to ignore and they begin to mate. Gregori has waited to long and loses control and nearly kills Savannah. It is only her acceptance of him that pulls him back from the abyss.

Savannah and Gregori must learn how to live with and love one another while staying one step ahead of the vampires and the human vampire hunting society who have targeted them.

== Awards ==
Winner of two of nine 2000 PEARL Awards

- Best Shape-Shifter
- Best Overall Paranormal Romance

2001 Rita Finalist

- Paranormal

2000 Romantic Times Reviewers' Choice Nominee

- Best Mainstream Novel—Reviewers' Choice Best Vampire for Dark Magic
- Career Achievement in Contemporary New Reality

2000 Awards Romance Books and Readers

- 1st for Contemporary
- 1st for Hero—Gregori
- 1st for Hottest Scenes—All

2000 All About Romance Awards

- Final in Most Tortured Hero - Gregori

2000 RBL Hughie Book Awards

- Favorite Hero—Gregori
- Hottest scene—bathtub

== See also ==
- Carpathians
- Dark Desire
- Dark Gold
- Dark Prince
