= Dark Secret (novel) =

2005 novel by Christine Feehan

- First edition
- Author: Christine Feehan
- Cover artist: Danny O'Leary; Julia Rogers
- Language: English
- Series: Dark Series
- Genre: Romance, paranormal, fantasy
- Publisher: Jove Books
- Publication date: 2005
- Publication place: United States
- Media type: Print (hardback & paperback)
- Pages: 367 pp (US paperback)
- ISBN: 0-515-13885-1
- OCLC: 57470448
- Preceded by: Dark Hunger
- Followed by: Dark Demon

Dark Secret is a novel written by American author Christine Feehan.

== Plot introduction ==
Rafael De La Cruz has spent centuries hunting vampires alongside his brothers. Over time, his ability to feel emotions has diminished almost entirely, leaving only sheer willpower to prevent him from becoming the very creature he hunts. Yet it may take more than willpower to keep him from the woman who is destined to be his alone.

For five years, rancher Colby Jansen has been the sole protector of her younger half-siblings, and with fierce determination and work she has kept her family together and the ranch operational. De La Cruz brothers are threatening that stability. Colby was illegitimate, but she viewed Armando Chevez as her father. The Chevez family have worked closely with De La Cruz family for centuries. When Armando Chevez married Colby's mother the Chevez family patriarch was displeased and disinherited Armando. A plane crash left Colby's mother dead and Armando paralyzed. On his death bed, Armando wrote to his family for aid but went unanswered. Several years after Armando's death, the Chevez families patriarch has died as well and the letters from Armando are uncovered. The Chevez family want very much to heal the tear in their family and want custody of Colby's younger brother Paul and sister Ginny. Colby vows to fight them, as she believes that they left Armando to suffer and die without so much as a letter.

Unable to reconcile with Colby the Chevez family have gone to the De La Cruz brothers for aid, Rafael and Nicholas De La Cruz. Nicholas scares Colby to death and she marks him as dangerous, but Rafael frightens her on another level for he is after more than her family, as he wants Colby and will not let anything stand between them. After ages of loneliness, he has a raw desire to claim her as his life mate, though she has nothing to do with him. She believes that he is nothing but a rich playboy and is trying to seduce her to steal her brother and sister from her.

Colby has another problem: for several years, she has been assisted on the ranch by an old cow hand named Pete Jessup, who is now missing. Several days after the De La Cruz brothers show up she goes to search the outskirts of the ranch and finds him murdered. Colby is horrified and confused as to who and why someone would do such a thing. Rafael and Nicholas, both powerful Carpathians, immediately realize that a vampire, the most vilest of all creatures, is to blame. This triggers Rafael defensive instincts and his intense need to protect Colby at all costs, even against her will.

Their relationship is fragile and tenuous. Colby believes he is out to get her brother and sister, and Rafael, an ancient Carpathian hunter, is completely clueless with dealing with a modern, fiercely independent woman. It is revealed that Colby has strong psychic talents and for a while she believes that Rafael might just be special as she is. Then she is forced to confront the knowledge that he is from a different species entirely. To make matters worse the vampire begins to attack her family and she is forced to accept the knowledge that vampires of myth really do exist. When Colby's younger brother Paul is attacked by the vampire, Rafael recognizes him as an old boyhood friend, Kirja Malinov. Only when Rafael faces off and nearly dies defending her and her family from Kirja does Colby let herself realize her feelings for Rafael.

== Awards and nominations ==
The novel appeared in several bestseller lists:

- New York Times
- Amazon
- Publishers Weekly
- USA Today
- Barnes & Noble Mass Market
- Barnes & Noble Romance
- Barnes & Noble Online
- B Daltons
- Borders
- Bookscan
- Waldenbooks Mass Market
- Waldenbooks
- Walmart
