= Dark Desire =

1999 novel by Christine Feehan

- First edition cover
- Author: Christine Feehan
- Language: English
- Series: Dark Series
- Genre: Romance; Paranormal; Fantasy
- Publisher: Love Spell
- Publication date: 1999
- Publication place: United States
- Media type: Print (hardback & paperback)
- Pages: 369 (US paperback)
- Preceded by: Dark Prince
- Followed by: Dark Gold

Dark Desire is the second novel in Christine Feehan's Dark Series. It takes place roughly 25 years after the events in Dark Prince (1999).

== Plot summary ==
The book begins with Jacques Dubrinsky, younger brother to Mikhail, being tortured and buried alive by members of the same fanatical group that attacked Raven and killed his sister some 25 years earlier in Dark Prince. As time goes on he loses much of his memory (perhaps even his sanity), the only thing he has a clear memory of is of the faces of his human tormentors, and the fact that he was betrayed by someone close to him.

Shea O'Halloran is a brilliant American surgeon and researcher trying to find the cure for a rare blood disorder. Her pursuit of a cure is personal, as she also suffers from the disease, and she fears that one day it will kill her. She occasionally has to have blood transfusions in order to survive. It is only after her mother Maggie commits suicide that she learns that she has inherited this disorder from her father. In her diary, her mother writes of having an affair with a man named Rand. She writes that he takes her blood when they make love, but he is a married man whose wife recently gave birth to a son and disappears before Maggie can tell him of her pregnancy. She believes that his wife Noelle discovered his infidelity and murdered him.

The loss of Shea's father devastates Maggie, and she retreats from the world, even her own child. Shea suffers a stark and painful childhood. Maggie commits suicide when Shea turns 18.

This disorder is not her only difference. No human medicine works on her; she can hear and feel the thoughts of others. When she touches a patient, she instantly knows what is wrong with him/her. Because of this, she is tracked by the same vampire hunting society that has imprisoned Jacques, believing she too is a vampire. They even show her pictures of seven others that they have caught and murdered. No matter where she goes, they always track her down.

One day Shea is racked by horrendous pain and visions of a man being tortured. For years she dreams of this man. After the society finds her again, she goes to the Carpathian Mountains to do further research on her disorder. She feels that since there are many legends of vampires in the region that this may be the epicenter of the disease.

When she goes for a walk, she's compelled to go to a spot deep in the forest. She finds a cellar where a man has been tortured and buried alive with a stake driven through his body. Suddenly he awakens and attacks her, twice feeding on her blood. She has a compulsion to help him, despite his violent assault. She takes him to her home and treats his wounds.

After he takes her blood for the third time, she becomes violently ill. He tells her that she doesn't have a disease, but that they are a different race of people who need blood to survive. Shea refuses to believe this at first. Then she realizes that she doesn't have normal human bodily functions. She soon realizes that this is the truth and that her father was a being just like Jacques.

After a few days, Shea has to leave Jacques to get more blood from the blood bank. She is spotted by another Carpathian, Byron, who realizes by her smell that she's been in contact with Jacques. He immediately informs Mikhail.

When they arrive, they see Shea apparently torturing Jacques; Mikhail attacks her thinking she is deranged. This triggers Jacques' protective instincts and he tries to kill them. Mikhail calls Gregori, their race's most powerful healer, who convinces Jacques to allow them to heal him.

The next evening, Shea and Jacques tell her life story. Shea was (before being converted by Jacques) half-human, half-Carpathian, something that was considered impossible. They also think that her birth confirms that a psychic human woman who is a lifemate to a Carpathian is capable of giving birth to female children. This is vitally important because their people are on the verge of extinction; no female has been born in more than 500 years. They inform her that her father is not dead, and it was Noelle who was murdered. They also tell her that her half-brother was also killed by the society.

Jacques also relates what happened to him, that he was betrayed and delivered to human killers. Before they can discover who the betrayer might be, Byron is taken. Raven is able to connect with him and determine that he is in a dark and dank room. Shea realizes that he is being housed in the same place the humans buried Jacques seven years earlier.

While the men go to the cellar to rescue him, the women stay behind. Shea is almost immediately uneasy, but Raven senses no threat. Suddenly, the humans attack the women, shooting the pregnant Raven. Luckily Shea and Gregori are able to save Raven and her child. The attack is puzzling because no one but Shea felt any threat. There is only one explanation for this; her father, Rand, is the one who betrayed Jacques and is a vampire. Gregori is selected to hunt Rand, but Rand attacks Jacques, who is forced to destroy him.

== Awards and nominations ==
1999 All About Romance Readers Awards

- Finalist for Most Tortured Hero
- Nominee for Best Other Paranormal Romance

2000 Awards Romance Books and Readers

- 3rd Place Fantasy

== See also ==
- Dark Gold
- Dark Magic
