= Dark Prince =

1999 paranormal romance novel by Christine Feehan

- First edition
- Author: Christine Feehan
- Audio read by: Juanita Parker
- Language: English
- Series: Dark Series
- Genre: Romance, paranormal, fantasy novel
- Publisher: Love Spell
- Publication date: 1999
- Publication place: United States
- Media type: Print (hardback & paperback), audio (MP3, CD & Cassette)
- Pages: 314 pp (US paperback)
- ISBN: 0-505-52372-8
- Followed by: Dark Desire

Dark Prince is a 1999 paranormal romance written by American author Christine Feehan. Published in 1999, it is the first book in her Dark Series, which to date has 38 titles. The audiobook is read by Juanita Parker.

== Plot summary ==
Dark Prince introduces the Carpathians, a powerful and ancient race. They have many gifts, including the ability to shape-shift, and extended life spans, living well over many years. Though they feed on human blood, they don't kill their human prey, and for the most part live among them without detection. Despite their gifts, the Carpathians are on the edge of extinction. There have been few children born to them in the past few centuries, those that have been born are all male and often die in the first year. It has been more than 500 years since a female has been born. Without females, many of the males are turning, becoming vampires, the monsters of human legend. After 200 years, a male Carpathian loses the ability to feel emotions and see in color. These will only return to him when he finds his lifemate, the other half of his soul.

Mikhail Dubrinsky, Prince of the Carpathians, has worked tirelessly for centuries to discover why so many of their children die in the first years, but his efforts have come to no avail. It is at this time, when he is on the brink of despair and self-destruction that he meets a beautiful human psychic, Raven Whitney. Raven is a strong telepath, and has worked with the police to capture four serial killers, but her gift has come with a price: a life of isolation, and pain whenever she uses her gift. When he meets her, he is shocked and amazed when he suddenly is able to see colors in her presence; he realizes that she is his lifemate. Despite his joy, there is doubt in his mind. No human woman has ever been a lifemate to a Carpathian. All human females who were converted had become deranged creatures, feeding on children and had to be destroyed.

He knows she is the only woman for him, the other half of his soul. He is determined to live as a human with her and to die when she does, but this is not to be, as Raven is attacked by fanatics, and he is forced to convert her to save her life. Her survival brings new hope to him and his people, for if one psychic human female can be a lifemate, surely there are others.

== Main characters ==
- Mikhail
- Raven

== Awards and nominations ==
- Winner of three out of the nine 1999 Pearl ParaNormal Excellence Awards in Romantic Literature
  - Best New Author of Paranormal Romance
  - Best Overall Paranormal Romance
  - Best Shape-Shifter
- 1999 All about Romance Readers Awards
  - Honorable Mention - Favorite New Author
  - Honorable Mention - Favorite 'Other' Romance
  - Finalist - Most Luscious
  - Finalist - Favorite Romance of the Year
  - Finalist - Favorite Villain-Rand
  - Finalist - Best New Discovery
  - Finalist - Best New Author
- 1999 Romance Journal's Francis Award
  - Semi-finalist - Best Other Paranormal Romance
- 1999 RBL Romantica Awards
  - Best Paranormal
  - Best Secondary Character (Gregori)
- 2000 Awards Romance Books and Readers
  - 1st Place - Fantasy
