= Christine Feehan =

American writer

Christine King Feehan
- Born: Christine King; Ukiah, California, U.S.
- Occupation: Novelist
- Writing career
- Period: 1999–present
- Genres: Romance, paranormal romance, fantasy, paranormal, military thriller, suspense, adventure
- Notable work: Dark Prince
- Website: www.christinefeehan.com

Christine Feehan (born Christine King in Ukiah, California) is an American author of paranormal romance, paranormal military thrillers, and fantasy. She is a #1 New York Times, #1 Publishers Weekly, and International bestselling author of seven series; Carpathian (aka Dark Series), GhostWalker Series, Drake Sisters, Sister of the Heart (Sea Haven) Series, Shadow Riders Series, Leopard Series and Torpedo Ink Series. Six of the seven series have made #1 on the New York Times bestseller list. As of January 2020 she has 80 published novels. The first in her Torpedo Ink Series, Judgment Road, debuted at #1 on the New York Times bestsellers list.

== Biography ==
Christine Feehan was born in Ukiah, California. She grew up with three brothers and ten sisters. She spent a lot of time getting in trouble at school for writing instead of doing the things she was supposed to do. Later she forced her ten sisters to read every word.

Feehan's first job was working in a library, then she went on to take journalism classes and worked at the Ukiah Journal.

Feehan trained in martial arts, earning a 3rd degree black belt in Tang Soo Do, going on to acquire her instructor's license. She taught martial arts for over twenty years, specializing in women's self-defense.

== Career ==
Time magazine said, "After Bram Stoker, Anne Rice, and Joss Whedon (who created the venerated Buffy the Vampire Slayer), Christine Feehan is the person most credited with popularizing the neck gripper." USA Today called her "The Queen of paranormal romance."

Feehan has been published in multiple languages and in many formats, including audio book, e-book, hardcover and large print. In October 2007 her first manga comic, Dark Hunger, was released in stores. This was the first manga comic released by Berkley Publishing and it made #11 on Publishers Weekly Bestseller's List.

Feehan's ground-breaking book trailer commercials have been shown on TV and in movie theaters. She has been featured on local TV, and appeared on The Montel Williams Show. Dark Legend was featured on the cover of Romantic Times Magazine, Dark Challenge was seen in the movie Kate & Leopold starring Meg Ryan and Hugh Jackman, and several of her books appeared in the 2017 movie Happy Death Day.

Feehan has appeared as an honored guest at numerous writers’ conventions, including Romantic Times Convention, Get Caught Reading at Sea Cruise, Celebrate Romance Conference, Emerald City Conference, and numerous Romance Writers of America Conferences. She was also a special guest at the 2013 San Diego Comic-Con.

== Personal life ==
Feehan has eleven children and several grandchildren, as well as fourteen brothers and sisters. Her son, Calvert, passed away in the 1990s following a motorcycle accident.

In 2015 her family home in Cobb, California, burned down in the Valley Fire.

Feehan lives in Mendocino, California, near the ocean in the Redwoods. She has several dogs, including two large black Russian terriers.

== Awards ==
Feehan is a #1 New York Times best selling author of seven series. She has won multiple Paranormal Excellence Awards for Romantic Literature (PEARL) and Romantic Times awards. She has been on bestsellers list, including those of Publishers Weekly and USA Today. Feehan has also received a Career Achievement Award from Romantic Times and has been nominated for a RITA award by the Romance Writers of America.

=== #1 New York Times Best Sellers List ===
Novel	Publication Date	New York Times Best Seller List
Safe Harbor	June 2007	Paperback Best Sellers
Dark Curse	September 2008	Best Sellers: Fiction
Murder Game	December 2008	Paperback Best Sellers: Fiction: Mass-Market
Hidden Currents	June 2009	Paperback Best Sellers: Mass Market Fiction
Street Game	December 2009	Paperback Best Sellers: Fiction: Mass-Market
Burning Wild	April 2009	Paperback Best Sellers: Fiction: Mass-Market
Dark Slayer	September 2009	Hardcover Fiction
Wild Fire	April 2010	Paperback Best Sellers: Fiction: Mass-Market
Air Bound	May 2014	Paperback Best Sellers: Fiction: Mass-Market
Viper Game	January 2015	Paperback Best Sellers: Fiction: Mass-Market
Earth Bound	July 2015	Paperback Best Sellers: Fiction: Mass-Market
Wild Cat	November 2015	Paperback Best Sellers: Fiction: Mass-Market
Fire Bound	April 2016	Paperback Best Sellers: Fiction: Mass-Market
Judgment Road	January 2018	Combined Print & E-Book Fiction
Desolation Road	July 2020	Combined Print & E-Book Fiction

=== Romantic Times Awards ===
Novel	Year	Category	Award
Dark Magic	2000	Vampire paranormal romance	Reviewer's Choice Award
Dark Fire	2001	Vampire paranormal romance	Reviewer's Choice Award
Dark Guardian	2002	Vampire romance	Reviewer's Choice Award
Lair of the Lion	2002	Historical paranormal romance	Reviewer's Choice Award
--	2003	Contemporary new reality	Career Achievement Award
Dark Destiny	2004	Vampire romance	Reviewer's Choice Award
--	2015	Paranormal romance	Career Achievement Award

=== Paranormal Excellence Awards in Romantic Literature (PEARL) Awards ===
Novel	Year	Award
Dark Prince	1999	Best new author, best shapeshifter, and best overall
Dark Magic	2000	Best shapeshifter and best overall
Dark Dream	2001	Best novella and in best anthology
Dark Fire	2001	Best shapeshifter and best overall
After the Music	2001	In best anthology
Dark Guardian	2002	Best overall
Dark Melody	2003	Best shapeshifter and favorite overall
Dark Descent	2003	Best novella and in best anthology
Dark Hunger	2004	In best anthology
Mind Game	2004	Best fantasy
Dark Possession	2007	Best vampire

=== Other Awards ===
Novel	Year	Category	Award
Dark Magic	2001	Paranormal	Rita Awards Finalist
Dark Fire	2001	Best heroine and other paranormal	Francis Award
--	2004	--	RIO Award of Excellence
Water Bound	2011	Paranormal	Rita Awards Finalist
--	--	--	Golden Leaf Awards (New Jersey Romance Writers)
