= Social cycle theory =

Type of social theories

Social cycle theories are among the earliest social theories in sociology. Unlike the theory of social evolutionism, which views the evolution of society and human history as progressing in some new, unique direction(s), sociological cycle theory argues that events and stages of society and history generally repeat themselves in cycles.

Such a theory does not necessarily imply that there cannot be any social progress. In the early theory of Sima Qian and the more recent theories of long-term ("secular") political-demographic cycles, an explicit accounting is made of social progress.

== Historical forerunners ==
Interpretation of history as repeating cycles of Dark and Golden Ages was a common belief among ancient cultures. Kyklos (Ancient Greek: κύκλος [kýklos], "cycle") is a term used by some classical Greek authors to describe what they considered as the cycle of governments in a society. It was roughly based on the history of Greek city-states in the same period. The concept of the kyklos is first elaborated by Plato, Aristotle, and most extensively Polybius. They all came up with their own interpretation of the cycle, and possible solutions to break the cycle, since they thought the cycle to be harmful.

Later writers such as Cicero and Machiavelli commented on the kyklos. The more limited cyclical view of history defined as repeating cycles of events was put forward in the academic world in the 19th century in historiosophy (a branch of historiography) and is a concept that falls under the category of sociology. However, Polybius, Ibn Khaldun (see Asabiyyah), and Giambattista Vico can be seen as precursors of this analysis. The saeculum was identified in Roman times. In recent times, P. R. Sarkar in his social cycle theory has used this idea to elaborate his interpretation of history.

=== Plato ===
Plato describes his cycle of governments in his work Republic, Book VIII and IX. He distinguishes five forms of government: aristocracy, timocracy, oligarchy, democracy, and tyranny, and writes that governments devolve respectively in this order from aristocracy into tyranny. Plato's cycle of governments is linked with his anthropology of the rulers that come with each form of government. This philosophy is intertwined with the way the cycle of governments plays out.

An aristocracy is ruled by aristocratic people whose rule is guided by their rationality. The decline of aristocracy into timocracy happens when people who are less qualified to rule come to power. Their rule and decision-making is guided by honour. Timocracy devolves into oligarchy as soon as those rulers act in pursuit of wealth. Oligarchy devolves into democracy when the rulers act on behalf of freedom. Lastly, democracy devolves into tyranny if rulers mainly seek power. Plato believes that having a philosopher king, and thus having an aristocratic form of government is the most desirable.

=== Polybius ===
According to Polybius, who has the most fully developed version of the kyklos, it rotates through the three basic forms of government: democracy, aristocracy, and monarchy, and the three degenerate forms of each of these governments: ochlocracy, oligarchy, and tyranny. Originally society is in ochlocracy but the strongest figure emerges and sets up a monarchy. The monarch's descendants, who lack virtue because of their family's power, become despots and the monarchy degenerates into a tyranny.

Because of the excesses of the ruler, the tyranny is overthrown by the leading citizens of the state, who set up an aristocracy. They too, quickly forget about virtue, and the state becomes an oligarchy. These oligarchs are overthrown by the people, who set up a democracy. Democracy soon becomes corrupt and degenerates into ochlocracy, beginning the cycle anew. Polybius's concept of the cycle of governments is called anacyclosis.

Polybius, in contrast to Aristotle, focuses on the idea of mixed government: the idea that the ideal government is one that blends elements of monarchy, aristocracy, and democracy. Aristotle mentions this notion but pays little attention to it. Polybius saw the Roman Republic as the embodiment of this mixed constitution, and this would explain why the Roman Republic was so powerful and why it remained stable for a longer amount of time. Polybius' full description can be found in Book VI of his Histories.

=== Cicero ===
Cicero describes anacyclosis in his philosophical work De re publica. His version of the anacyclosis is heavily inspired by Polybius' writings. Cicero argues, contrary to Polybius, that the Roman state can prevail and will not succumb to the harmful cycle despite its mixed government, as long as the Roman Republic will return to its ancient virtues (mos maiorum).

=== Machiavelli ===
Machiavelli, writing during the Renaissance, appears to have adopted Polybius' version of the cycle. Machiavelli's adoption of anacyclosis can be seen in Book I, Chapter II of his Discourses on Livy. Although Machiavelli adopts the idea of the circular structure in which types of governments alternate, he does not accept Polybius' idea that the cycle naturally devolves through the exact same pattern of governments. He mixes the concept of the "cycle of regimes" with the cycle of civilizations, which are two separate and distinct concepts.

== 19th and 20th century theories ==
Thomas Carlyle conceived of history as though it were a phoenix, growing and dying in stages akin to the seasons. He saw the French Revolution as the ashes or winter of European civilisation, and that it would necessarily build out of the rubble.

Russian philosopher Nikolai Danilewski in Rossiia i Evropa (1869), differentiated between various smaller civilizations (Egyptian, Chinese, Persian, Greek, Roman, German, and Slav, among others). He wrote that each civilization has a life cycle, and by the end of the 19th century the Roman-German civilization was in decline, while the Slav civilization was approaching its Golden Age. A similar theory was put forward by Oswald Spengler, who in his Der Untergang des Abendlandes (1918) also argued that the Western civilization had entered its final phase of development and its decline was inevitable.

The first social cycle theory in sociology was created by Italian sociologist and economist Vilfredo Pareto in his Trattato di Sociologia Generale (1916). He centered his theory on the concept of an elite social class, which he divided into cunning 'foxes' and violent 'lions'. In his view of society, the power constantly passes from the 'foxes' to the 'lions' and vice versa.

Sociological cycle theory was also developed by Pitirim A. Sorokin in his Social and Cultural Dynamics (1937, 1943). He classified societies according to their 'cultural mentality', which can be ideational (reality is spiritual), sensate (reality is material), or idealistic (a synthesis of the two). He interpreted the contemporary West as a sensate civilization dedicated to technological progress, and prophesied its fall into decadence and the emergence of a new ideational or idealistic era.

Alexandre Deulofeu developed a mathematical model of social cycles, that he claimed fit historical facts. He argued that civilizations and empires go through cycles in his book Mathematics of History, written in Catalan, published in 1951. He claims that each civilization passes through a minimum of three 1,700-year cycles. As part of civilizations, empires have an average lifespan of 550 years. He stated that by knowing the nature of these cycles, it could be possible to modify the cycles in such a way that change could be peaceful, instead of leading to war. Deulofeu believed he had found the origin of Romanesque art, during the 9th century, in an area between Empordà and Roussillon, which he argued was the cradle of the second cycle of western European civilization.

== Literary expressions ==
Much of post-apocalyptic fiction depicts various kinds of cyclical history, with depictions of civilization collapsing and being slowly built up again to collapse again and so on.

An early example is Anatole France's 1908 satirical novel Penguin Island (French: L'Île des Pingouins) which traces the history of Penguinia—a thinly disguised analogue of France—from medieval times to the modern times and into a future of a monstrous super-city—which eventually collapses. This is followed by a renewed Feudalism and agrarian society, and a gradual building up of increasingly advanced civilization—culminating with a new monstrous super-city which would eventually collapse again, and so on.

A later example is Walter M. Miller Jr.'s A Canticle for Leibowitz, which begins in the aftermath of a devastating nuclear war, with the Catholic Church seeking to preserve a remnant of old texts, as it did in the historical Early Middle Ages, and ends with a new civilization, built up over two thousand years, once again destroying itself in a nuclear war. A new group of Catholic clergy again set out to preserve a remnant of civilized knowledge.

In the future depicted in October the First Is Too Late, a 1966 science fiction novel by astrophysicist Fred Hoyle, the protagonists fly over where they expected to see the United States, but see no sign of urban civilization. At first assuming they were in the pre-1750 past, they later find it was a future time. Humanity is doomed to go through repeated cycles of industrialization, overpopulation, collapse—followed by rebuilding, and then again industrialization, overpopulation and collapse and so on, over and over again. In the far future, a civilization which is aware of this history no longer wants progress.

== Contemporary theories ==
=== Political-Demographic Cycle Theory ===
One recent argument in the study of the long-term dynamic social processes is based on assumptions that political-demographic cycles are basic features of the dynamics of complex agrarian systems, where demographic change is inferred to be the independent variable causing other dependent variables like political changes, revolutions, dynastic collapses, etc.

Arguments about the explanatory power of political-demographic cycles in the pre-modern history of Europe and China, and in chiefdom level societies worldwide has been asserted for quite a long time, and already in the 1980s more or less developed mathematical models of demographic cycles started to be produced (first of all for Chinese "dynastic cycles") (Usher 1989). At the moment there are a considerable number of such models (Chu and Lee 1994; Nefedov 1999, 2002, 2003, 2004; S. Malkov, Kovalev, and A. Malkov 2000; S. Malkov and A. Malkov 2000; Malkov and Sergeev 2002, 2004a, 2004b; Malkov et al. 2002; Malkov 2002, 2003, 2004; Turchin 2003, 2005a; Korotayev et al. 2006).

=== Long cycle theory ===
George Modelski, who presented his ideas in the book Long Cycles in World Politics (1987), is the chief architect of long cycle theory. Long cycle theory describes the connection between war cycles, economic supremacy, and the political aspects of world leadership.

Long cycles, or long waves, offer perspectives on global politics by permitting "the careful exploration of the ways in which world wars have recurred, and lead states such as Britain and the United States have succeeded each other in an orderly manner." Not to be confused with Simon Kuznets' idea of long-cycles, or long-swings, long cycles of global politics are patterns of past world politics.

The long cycle, according to Dr. Dan Cox, is a period of time lasting approximately 70 to 100 years. At the end of that period, "the title of most powerful nation in the world switches hands." Modelski divides the long cycle into four phases. When periods of global war, which could last as much as one-fourth of the total long cycle, are factored in, the cycle can last from 87 to 122 years.

Many traditional theories of international relations, including the other approaches to hegemony, believe that the baseline nature of the international system is anarchy. Modelski's long cycle theory, however, states that war and other destabilizing events are a natural product of the long cycle and larger global system cycle. They are part of the living processes of the global polity and social order. Wars are "systemic decisions" that "punctuate the movement of the system at regular intervals." Because "world politics is not a random process of hit or miss, win or lose, depending on the luck of the draw or the brute strength of the contestants", anarchy does not play a role; long cycles have provided, for the last five centuries, a means for the successive selection and operation of numerous world leaders.

Modelski used to believe that long cycles were a product of the modern period. He suggests that the five long cycles, which have taken place since about 1500, are each a part of a larger global system cycle, or the modern world system.

Under the terms of long cycle theory, five hegemonic long cycles have taken place, each strongly correlating to economic Kondratieff Waves (or K-Waves). The first hegemon would have been Portugal during the 16th century, then the Netherlands during the 17th century. Next, Great Britain served twice, first during the 18th century, then during the 19th century. The United States has been serving as hegemon since the end of World War II.

In 1988, Joshua S Goldstein advanced the concept of the political midlife crisis in his book on "Long Cycle Theory", Long Cycles: Prosperity and War in the Modern Age, which offers four examples of the process:

- The British Empire and the Crimean War (1853–1856): A century after Britain's successful launch of the Industrial Revolution, and following the subsequent British railway boom of 1815–1853, Britain, in the Crimean War, attacked the Russian Empire, which was perceived as a threat to British India and to eastern Mediterranean trade routes to India. The Crimean War highlighted the poor state of the British Army, which were then addressed, and Britain concentrated on colonial expansion and took no further part in European wars until the outbreak of World War I in 1914.
- The German Empire and World War I (1914–1918): Under Chancellor Otto von Bismarck, Germany had been unified between 1864 and 1871, and then had seen 40 years' rapid industrial, military, and colonial expansion. In 1914 the Schlieffen Plan for conquering France in eight weeks was to have been followed by the subjugation of the Russian Empire, leaving Germany the master of Mitteleuropa (Central Europe). In the event, France, Britain, Russia, and the United States fought Germany to a standstill, to defeat, and to a humiliating peace settlement at Versailles (1919) and the establishment of Germany's unstable Weimar Republic (1919–1933), in a prelude to World War II.
- The Soviet Union and the Cuban Missile Crisis (1962): The Soviet Union had industrialised rapidly under Joseph Stalin and, following World War II, had become a rival nuclear superpower to the United States. In 1962 Soviet Premier Nikita Khrushchev, intent on securing strategic parity with the United States, covertly, with the support of Fidel Castro, shipped nuclear missiles to Castro's Cuba, 70 miles from the US state of Florida. US President John F. Kennedy blockaded (the term "quarantined" being used because a blockade is an act of war), the island of Cuba and negotiated the Soviet missiles' removal from Cuba (in exchange for the subsequent removal of US missiles from Turkey).
- The United States and the Vietnam War (1955–1975): During World War II and the ensuing postwar period, the United States had greatly expanded its military capacities and industries. After France, supported financially by the US, had been defeated in Vietnam in 1954 and that country had been temporarily split into North and South Vietnam under the 1954 Geneva Accords; and when war had broken out between the North and South following South Vietnam President Ngo Dinh Diem's refusal to permit all-Vietnam elections in 1956 as stipulated in the Geneva Accords, the ideologically anti-communist United States supported South Vietnam with materiel in a Cold War proxy war and by degrees allowed itself to be drawn into South Vietnam's losing struggle against communist North Vietnam and the Viet Cong acting in South Vietnam. Ultimately, following the defeat of South Vietnam and the United States, the US's governing belief that South Vietnam's defeat would result in all of remaining Mainland Southeast Asia "going communist" (as proclaimed by the US's "domino theory"), proved erroneous.

=== Kondratiev waves ===
In economics, Kondratiev waves, also called supercycles, great surges, long waves, K-waves or the long economic cycle, are hypothesized cycle-like phenomena in the modern world economy. It is stated that the period of a wave ranges from forty to sixty years. The cycles have alternating intervals of high sectoral growth and intervals of relatively slow growth.

Such theories are dismissed by most economists on the basis of econometric analysis, which has found that recessions are essentially random events, and the probability of a recession does not show any kind of pattern across time. Despite frequent use of the term business cycles to refer to changes in an economy around its trend line, the phrase is considered a misnomer. It is widely agreed that fluctuations in economic activity do not exhibit any kind of predictable repetition over time, and the appearance of cycles is a result of pareidolia.

=== Secular cycles theory ===
Recently the most important contributions to the development of the mathematical models of long-term ("secular") sociodemographic cycles have been made by Sergey Nefedov, Peter Turchin, Andrey Korotayev, and Sergey Malkov. What is important is that on the basis of their models Nefedov, Turchin and Malkov have managed to demonstrate that sociodemographic cycles were a basic feature of complex agrarian systems, and not a specifically Chinese or European phenomenon.

The basic logic of these models is as follows:

- After the population reaches the ceiling of the carrying capacity of land, its growth rate declines toward near-zero values.
- The system experiences significant stress with decline in the living standards of the common population, increasing the severity of famines, growing rebellions etc.
- As has been shown by Nefedov, most complex agrarian systems had considerable reserves for stability, however, within 50–150 years these reserves were usually exhausted and the system experienced a demographic collapse (a Malthusian catastrophe), when increasingly severe famines, epidemics, increasing internal warfare and other disasters led to a considerable decline of population.
- As a result of this collapse, free resources became available, per capita production and consumption considerably increased, the population growth resumed and a new sociodemographic cycle started.

It has become possible to model these dynamics mathematically in a rather effective way. Note that the modern theories of political-demographic cycles do not deny the presence of trend dynamics and attempt at the study of the interaction between cyclical and trend components of historical dynamics.

The models have two main phases, each with two subphases.

- Integrative phase
  - Expansion (growth)
  - Stagflation (compression)
- Disintegrative phase
  - Crisis phase (state breakdown)
  - Depression / intercycle

An intercycle is where a functioning state collapses and takes some time to rebuild.

Characteristic features of structural-demographic phases
Feature	Integrative phase		Disintegrative phase	
Feature	Expansion phase (growth)	Stagflation phase (compression)	Crisis phase (state breakdown)	Depression / Intercycle
Population	Increases	Slow increase	Decreases	Slow decrease
Elites	Low population and consumption	Increasing population and competition and consumption	High population, conflicts, high inequality	Reduction of population, downward mobility, reduced consumption
State strength and collective solidarity	Increasing	High but decreasing	Collapse	Attempts at rebuilding
Sociopolitical instability	Low	Increasing	High	Decreasing

Disintegrative phases typically do not have continuous disorder, but instead periods of strife alternating with relatively peaceful periods. This alternation typically has a period of about two human generation times (40 – 60 years), and Turchin calls it a "fathers and sons" cycle.

=== Fourth Turning theory ===
The Strauss–Howe generational theory, also known as the Fourth Turning theory or simply the Fourth Turning, which was created by authors William Strauss and Neil Howe, describes a theorized recurring generation cycle in American history. According to the theory, historical events are associated with recurring generational personas (archetypes). Each generational persona unleashes a new era, called a turning, in which a new social, political, and economic climate exists. Turnings tend to last around 20–22 years.

They are part of a larger cyclical "saeculum", a long human life, which usually spans between 80 and 90 years, although some saecula have lasted longer. The theory states that after every saeculum, a crisis recurs in American history, which is followed by a recovery (high). During this recovery, institutions and communitarian values are strong. Ultimately, succeeding generational archetypes attack and weaken institutions in the name of autonomy and individualism, which ultimately creates a tumultuous political environment that ripens conditions for another crisis.

=== Schlesinger liberal–conservative cycles of United States history ===
The cyclical theory (United States history) is a theory of US history developed by Arthur M. Schlesinger Sr. and Arthur M. Schlesinger Jr. It states that US history alternates between two kinds of phases:

- Liberal, increasing democracy, public purpose, human rights, concern with the wrongs of the many
- Conservative, containing democracy, private interest, property rights, concern with the rights of the few

Each kind of phase generates the other. Liberal phases generate conservative phases from activism burnout, and conservative phases generate liberal phases from accumulation of unsolved problems.

=== Huntington's creedal-passion episodes of United States history ===
Historian Samuel P. Huntington has proposed that American history has had several bursts of "creedal passion" roughly every 60 years. These are efforts to bring American government closer to the "American creed" of being "egalitarian, participatory, open, noncoercive, and responsive to the demands of individuals and groups."

=== United States party systems ===
The United States has had six party systems over its history. Each one is a characteristic platform and set of constituencies of each of the two major parties. A new party system emerges from a burst of reform, and in some cases, the disintegration of a party in the previous system (1st: Federalist, 2nd: Whig).

=== Skowronek United States regimes and presidency types ===
Political scientist Stephen Skowronek has proposed that American history has gone through several regimes, with four main types of presidencies. Each regime has a dominant party and an opposition party. The President involved in starting it is a "reconstructive" one, and that President's successors in the dominant party are "articulating" ones. However, opposition-party Presidents are often elected, "preemptive" ones. A regime ends with having a President or two from its dominant party, a "disjunctive" President.

=== Klingberg cycles of United States foreign policy ===
Frank Klingberg has proposed a cyclic theory of US foreign policy. It states that the US alternates between extroverted phases, phases involving military adventures, challenging other nations, and annexing territory, and introverted phases, phases with the absence of these activities.

== Green/Environmental Perspectives in Social Cycle Theory ==
Comparative historical environmental sociologist Mark D. Whitaker in Ecological Revolution (2010) analyzed approximately 2,500 years of world history across mostly China, Japan, and Europe (Roman Republic/Empire and beyond to the modern period). Most argue environmental movements are a novel feature of world politics. Whitaker argued that they are a durable feature of a degradative political economy. Past or present, environmental politics and scientific movements became expressed in religious change movements as oppositions to state environmental degradation using discourses available.

This is similar to the secular cycle arguments from world-systems theorist Sing C. Chew about recurring cycles of degradative cultural politics and environmental and cultural recovery in his book The Recurring Dark Ages (2006). Chew argued that there were three "Dark Ages" in world environmental history characterized by periods of state collapse and reorientation in the world economy associated with more localist frameworks of community, economy, and identity coming to dominate the nature/culture relationships after environmental destruction. Thus, recreated communities were founded in these so-called 'Dark Ages,' novel religions were popularized, and perhaps most importantly to him the environment had several centuries to recover from previous destruction. Chew argues that modern green politics and bioregionalism is the start of a similar movement of the present day potentially leading to wholesale system transformation. Therefore, we may be on the edge of yet another global "dark age" which is bright instead of dark on many levels since he argues for human community returning with environmental healing as empires collapse.

Different than Chew's secular cycle of 'culture and nature,' the secular cycle theory in Ecological Revolution is an institutional argument. It follows what happens after unrepresentative states develop. So, first, it is an institutional argument per se instead of a cultural argument, and second, it is an equally institutional recovery/reinvention movement of what happens in environmental recovery instead of only a cultural recovery.

Whitaker describes characteristics why our unrepresentative historical states collapse because of unrepresentative and violent conquest-oriented beginnings. Because of these characteristics, what follows are elaborations of growing environmental problems, economic consolidation, growing inequality, and privatization. These become opposed predictably by a welter of heterodox religio-scientific-ecological movements reinventing regional political representative opposition against such unrepresentative consolidation. As a result, origins of our large scale humanocentric ‘axial religions' and periods of scientific advance in human history have been connected to such heterodox anti-systemic environmental movements. Many major religious movements of the past were ‘environmentalist’ by being representative and regionalist "health, ecological, and economic" movements, rolled into one. The empirical data reviewed by Whitaker concentrates on the material concerns of religious and scientific movements of the past that regularly join in these three topical areas of movements about health, ecology, and economic/technical changes to fit an autonomous regional economy with restorative ethics as separate from an extractive state political economy.

So in comparative retrospect, unrepresentative states create a major organizationally-caused secular cycle (not a population-based Malthusian cycle) that causes their own later self-destruction over time because of their unrepresentative drive of political economic consolidation, enclosure, privatization, and environmental degradation. At the beginning, such state leaderships may attempt ongoing repression of any environmental and social risk feedback against themselves. However, as state capacities decline, that feedback can expand by default and catalyze many different more regionalized 'ecological revolutions' against such a declining state. Three paths may happen here: (1) the state elites might buckle and become more representative and integrate such a more representative and confederative multi-regional group within them; (2) another path is the same unrepresentative elites try to sponsor only the most religiously violent and conquest oriented groups in this 'ecological revolution' in a renewal of their unrepresentative state framework; (3) the whole state framework may collapse and end for a time in its cultural legitimacy and institutional capacities. In that third path, in comparative retrospect, after a period of more regional representation or even more confederative regionalism, the next unrepresentative state typically develops violently in military consolidation. It 'renews' the tragic unrepresentative and degradative political relationships once more, leading to the next state self-destruction and ecological degradation period. In this process of reconsolidation, a conquering state attempts to co-opt cultural, religious, scientific, or other institutional factors of the previous rebels into its fresh military consolidation in order to try to legitimate itself, while it tries to crush and stop cultural transmissions or even historical memory of any more regionally autonomous institutions that may still exist or would be remembered.

However, if another unrepresentative state is the only result, expect the same secular cycle of repetition and another ongoing ecological revolution as a repeating tragedy of history. In other words, religio-ecological and scientific movements get paired against chosen forms of state-led environmental degradation in a predictable fashion.

Alternatively, a triumph of history is when people choose to make a more representative and sustainable state out of "strong confederative" arrangements. First, this is noted in Whitaker's other book Toward a Bioregional State (2005) which argues for an institutionally representative and regionally sustainable polity design forestalls or blocks such a tragic secular cycle from ever repeating institutionally. Second, this is noted in other updated research about these historical precursors of "strong confederations" that were some of the most long-lived, representative, and sustainable polities humanity ever invented. These 'eco-confederations' of the past merged strong confederations with shared and regional commons institutions.

Whitaker's institutionally-driven views are similar to Bauwens's views on the Pulsation of the Commons, described as:

"...[The] concept...that human history evolves in recurring patterns, whereby more extractive/degradative phases of human history, driven by competitive state elites, are followed by regenerative phases, during which the more strategic roles of the commons revives....[There is]...historic and contemporary evidence of a regular 'pulsation of the commons' in which periodically, local populations and spiritual reformers engage in the reorganizations of their local economy and social order by re-instituting commons institutions and practices, which heal the land and protect resources for the longer term, paradoxically recreating a surplus that generates a new expansive cycle."

== See also ==
- Cyclic model (cosmology)
- Historic recurrence
- List of cycles
- Revolutionary wave
- Societal collapse
- State collapse
