= Darwinia (novel) =

1998 novel by Robert Charles Wilson

- Cover of first edition (hardcover)
- Author: Robert Charles Wilson
- Cover artist: Jim Burns
- Language: English
- Genre: Science fiction, alternate history
- Publisher: Tor Books
- Publication date: 1998
- Publication place: United States
- Media type: Print (hardback & paperback)
- Pages: 320
- ISBN: 0-312-86038-2
- OCLC: 38495316
- Dewey Decimal: 813/.54 21
- LC Class: PR9199.3.W4987 D37 1998

Darwinia is a 1998 science fiction/alternate history novel by American-Canadian writer Robert Charles Wilson.

Darwinia was written in segments, in Vancouver, Whitehorse (Yukon), and Toronto.

== Plot summary ==
In March 1912, in the event some called the "Miracle", Europe and parts of Asia and Africa, including its inhabitants, disappear suddenly overnight and are replaced with a slice of an alien planet, a land mass of roughly equal outlines and terrain features, but with a strange new flora and fauna which seem to have followed a different path in evolution.

Seen by some as an act of divine retribution, the "Miracle" affects the lives of people all around and transforms world history. Having been "The New World" settled by Europeans, America now becomes involved in an effort to re-settle the strange new Europe. Lord Kitchener – who, with no World War I breaking out, lives on past 1916 – tries to hold together the remnants of the British Empire and re-settle Britain, though the refounded London is little more than "a raw frontier town".

Against this background, the book describes the life and the adventures of Guilford Law, a young American photographer. As a 14-year-old boy, Guilford Law witnessed the "Miracle" as shimmering lights moving eerily across the ocean sky. As a grown man, he is determined to travel to the strange continent of Darwinia and explore its mysteries. To that end, he enlists as a photographer in the Finch expedition, which plans to travel up the river that used to be known as the Rhine and penetrate the bizarre new continent's hidden depths as far as possible. He lands in the middle of the jungle in the midst of nationalistic skirmishes, in which partisans attack and wipe out most of the party of the Finch expedition on the continent that they believe to belong to them.

Law brought an unwanted companion with him, a mysterious twin who seems to have both lived and died on an alternate Earth unchanged by the Miracle. The twin first appears to Guilford in dreams, and he brings a message that Darwinia is not what it seems to be, and Guilford is not who he seems to be.

At the end of the story, it is revealed that the end of time is swiftly approaching and that the universe, the Earth, and all the consciousness that ever existed are really being preserved in a computer-like simulation known as the Archive. The Archive was built by a coalition of all the sentient beings in the universe in an effort to save consciousness from death. However, "viruses" (parasitic artificial life-forms) known as psions have invaded the system of the Archive. Guilford Law eventually learns that he and those like him serve as instruments in a cosmic struggle against the psions for the survival of consciousness itself.

== Reception ==
Darwinia won the Prix Aurora Award (Canadian science fiction and fantasy) for Best Long Form in 1999, and was nominated for the 1999 Hugo Award for Best Novel.

John Clute considers the novel to follow the themes of Canadian literature, despite an opening which indicates that it would follow the themes of American literature; he has also criticized Wilson for "not (...) creat(ing) any single character capable either of understanding [the] story, or effecting it in his own person."

== See also ==
- October the First Is Too Late
- Omega Point
- Simulated reality
