= Ossian's Ride =

1959 novel by Fred Hoyle

- Cover of the first edition (UK)
- Author: Fred Hoyle
- Cover artist: Brian Sanders
- Language: English
- Genre: Science fiction
- Publisher: Heinemann
- Publication date: 1959
- Media type: Print (book)

Ossian's Ride is a science fiction novel by British astrophysicist Fred Hoyle, published in 1959.

== Plot summary ==
In the 1970 of this story, Eire has become an authoritarian police state, made somewhat acceptable to the population by the vast wealth flowing from a secret and forbidden science zone occupying a large area of the South-West. Here is based the mysterious 'Industrial Corporation of Éire' which has produced a range of new technologies. Its enigmatic founders are not Irish: they settled there and resist all attempts to find out who they are. A young British scientist agrees to be sent as a spy to find out just what is going on.

Although labelled as Science Fiction by the publisher, the bulk of the novel owes more to the thriller style of the John Buchan tradition, as the Cambridge hero battles across wild Irish landscapes fighting a series of murderous thugs and secret policemen.

The science fiction denouement is confined almost to the last chapter and foreshadows the theme of Hoyle's later A for Andromeda, though in a far more cursory manner. Also of note is the way the young hero seems to come to accept the notion of an authoritarian society ruled by a few self-appointed "supermen".

The link with the legendary Irish hero Ossian is peripheral to the plot and is explained near the end.

== Reception ==
Galaxy reviewer Floyd C. Gale rated the novel with five stars, saying that Hoyle's craftsmanship has "improved tremendously since his first effort" (The Black Cloud 1957); he described the novel as "a science-mystery-spy story that has no apparent forebear in the SF repertory."
