= Vortex (Wilson novel) =

2011 novel by Robert Charles Wilson

- Author: Robert Charles Wilson
- Language: English
- Series: Spin
- Genre: Science fiction
- Publisher: Tor Books
- Publication date: July 2011
- Publication place: United States
- Pages: 331 (first edition, hardback)
- ISBN: 978-0-7653-2342-2
- Preceded by: Axis

Vortex is a science fiction novel by American-Canadian writer Robert Charles Wilson, published in July 2011. It is the third book in the Spin series, following the Hugo Award-winning Spin and Axis.

== Plot summary ==
Vortex tells the story of Turk Findley, the protagonist introduced in Axis, who is transported ten thousand years into the future by the mysterious entities called "the Hypotheticals." In this future humanity exists on a chain of planets connected by Hypothetical gateways; but Earth itself is a dying world, effectively quarantined.

Turk and his young friend Isaac Dvali are taken up by a community of fanatics who use them to enable a passage to the dying Earth, where they believe a prophecy of human/Hypothetical contact will be fulfilled. The prophecy is only partly true, however, and Turk must unravel the truth about the nature and purpose of the Hypotheticals before they carry him on a journey through warped time to the end of the universe itself.

== Timeline ==
The chapters of the book alternate between two timelines: one approximately 40 years following the events of Spin and the other approximately 10,000 years following the events of Axis.

== Reception ==
Reviewer David Mead writes that readers will be very pleased with the final adventure:

Wilson provides a hopeful conclusion to a narrative that foresees the death of all life on Earth, first as a result of global climate change and then of the destructive expansion of the dying sun when the Hypotheticals remove the barrier that has protected the planet. In each of the novels of the trilogy, the wondrous events that precipitate the story - the imposition of the barrier, the Archways, the experience of life aboard a gigantic floating archipelago that sails from Equatoria to a ruined Earth - are registered or reported by finely drawn characters.
