= Julian: A Christmas Story =

2006 novella by Robert Charles Wilson

- First edition
- Author: Robert Charles Wilson
- Cover artist: Edward Miller
- Language: English
- Genre: Fiction
- Publisher: PS Publishing
- Publication date: 2006
- Media type: Novella
- Pages: 86 (hardcover edition); 50 (online edition)
- ISBN: 978-1-905834-26-6

Julian: A Christmas Story is a dystopian speculative fiction novella written by Robert Charles Wilson.

== Synopsis ==
Julian is told from the perspective of teenager Adam Hazzard, who lives in the rural town of Williams Ford, in the state of Athabaska (today a region in Canada, but in the story, a part of the greater United States) in 2172, at a time when technology has regressed to 19th century levels. The story deals with his relationship with his friend Julian Comstock (later in life called Julian Conqueror or Julian the Agnostic), an aristocratic boy of his age with radical beliefs about God, science, and evolution, notably his beliefs in DNA and the Moon Landings, in defiance of the omnipresent and theocratic Church of the Dominion of Jesus Christ on Earth, which came about as a result of the end of oil in the 21st century, a time which was later interpreted as a Biblical Tribulation. Julian is the nephew of the President, Deklan Comstock, and it is rumored that Deklan may send Julian to fight in the Labrador War against the European powers, in order to quiet dissent against him that his family does not care about the soldiers. The story centers on how Adam and Julian will avoid the coming draft and remain alive despite Julian's beliefs.

Robert Charles Wilson has created a full-length novel of the story of Julian, titled Julian Comstock: A Story of 22nd-Century America.

== Reception ==
Ray Olson in his review for Booklist said that "Wilson realizes that, along with old technology, old speech patterns and words are likely to revive in the world he imagines. His use of such diction makes his prose sound euphoniously as well as piquantly old-fashioned."
