= Fifth Planet (novel) =

1963 novel by Fred Hoyle

- First edition
- Author: Fred Hoyle and Geoffrey Hoyle
- Language: English
- Genre: Science fiction
- Publisher: Heinemann
- Publication date: 1963
- Media type: Print (book)
- Pages: 224

Fifth Planet is a science fiction novel written by astrophysicist Sir Fred Hoyle and his son Geoffrey Hoyle.

== Plot summary ==
Another star, named Helios, is due to pass close to the sun, close enough for conventional spacecraft to reach it. The first planets observed orbiting around Helios are four gas giants, but then an inner "Fifth Planet", named Achilles, is found. Signs of chlorophyll are detected, suggesting that it supports life. Rival Soviet and US expeditions are launched to visit it. (The world balance as it existed in 1963 is assumed to be still in place, although Britain now holds the neutral position once held by Switzerland.)

The theme of the novel is embodied in a conversation between two of the US spacecraft's crew as they begin exploring Achilles, which appears to have a benign and predominantly grassy environment. One of them feels uneasy in this landscape and suggests a similarity of their position to fish in a pond on earth "swimming around thinking fishy thoughts". The crew member comments "Well, what if we're like those bloody fish, swimming about our own little pond, and not knowing something else is very near us." Soon after these remarks are made, an alien influence starts to manifest itself.

One element of the plot is that the Soviet expedition includes the first woman in space. This fictional milestone was eclipsed by reality soon after publication, when Valentina Tereshkova became the first woman in space on Vostok 6 in June 1963.
