= The Chronoliths =

2001 novel by Robert Charles Wilson

- Cover of first edition (hardcover)
- Author: Robert Charles Wilson
- Cover artist: Jim Burns
- Language: English
- Genre: Science fiction novel
- Publisher: Tor Books
- Publication date: 2001
- Publication place: Canada
- Media type: Print (Hardcover & Paperback)
- Pages: 301
- ISBN: 0-312-87384-0
- OCLC: 46634404
- Dewey Decimal: 813/.54 21
- LC Class: PR9199.3.W4987 C48 2001

The Chronoliths is a 2001 science fiction novel by American-Canadian writer Robert Charles Wilson. It was nominated for the 2002 Hugo Award for Best Novel and tied for the 2002 John W. Campbell Memorial Award for Best Science Fiction Novel.

== Plot summary ==
Software designer Scott Warden is living with his family in early twenty-first century Thailand after his latest contract has ended. He and his friend Hitch Paley are among the first to find an enormous monolith which appears out of nowhere in the jungle. On closer examination, it is found to be a monument made of a mysterious, indestructible substance. It bears an inscription commemorating a military victory by someone named "Kuin", presumably an Asian warlord—twenty years in the future.

Over the next twenty years, increasingly grand monuments to Kuin continue to appear—first in Asia, then in much of the rest of the world. Pro-Kuin and anti-Kuin political movements spring up, leading to the rise of economic problems, fatalistic cults, and open war.

Scott has become entangled with his former teacher and mentor Sue Chopra, a scientist who has assembled a team of fellow researchers to investigate the chronoliths and learn to predict their appearances. With Sue's team, Scott witnesses a new chronolith that appears in Jerusalem.

Kaitlin, his daughter, becomes caught up in the hysteria and joins a pro-Kuin youth cult; while trying to find her, Scott meets Ashlee, a single mother whose son Adam Mills joined the same cult. This leads to Scott and his companions being on hand to witness yet another chronolith appearance in Mexico in which Adam apparently dies. Scott quits his work with Sue and marries Ashlee, trying to live a normal life.

Sue Chopra comes to believe that Kuin has made the chronoliths in order to inspire fear and defeatism, making the future victories inevitable by gaining support ahead of time. In an effort to fight Kuin's growing influence, she uses the revelation that Adam is alive and leading a Kuin worshipper group to recruit Scott back into her work, with the plan to destroy the first chronolith predicted to appear in the United States.

The chronolith appears, but shortly after, it self-destructs, apparently sabotaged by a maker who exceeded the limits of the technology.

A militant faction led by Adam Mills attacks their base of operations, takes Chopra hostage, and menaces Scott's family. Before allowing herself to be taken hostage, Sue entrusts Scott with a secret: she believes it's her fate to be made prisoner in order to be able to sabotage this chronolith. After this, a twenty year-long war ensues. While no physical Kuin ever appears to led the factions fighting on his name, Scott finds out by chance that Adam's middle name was Quinn, which may hint to him being the closest to a real Kuin.

Scott lives to see the collapse of the Kuinist movement and a scientific renaissance sparked by Chopra's chronolith research. At the end of the story he and Kaitlin watch the launch of an interstellar probe that seems to be based on this research.

== Publication history ==
- First hardcover edition, 2001, Tor Books, ISBN 0-312-87384-0.
- First paperback edition, 2002, Tor Books, ISBN 0-8125-4524-9.
