= Julian Comstock: A Story of 22nd-Century America =

Book by Robert Charles Wilson

- Hardcover, first edition
- Author: Robert Charles Wilson
- Language: English
- Genre: Fiction
- Publisher: Tor Books
- Publication date: June 23, 2009
- Publication place: United States
- Media type: Print (hardcover)
- Pages: 416
- ISBN: 978-0-7653-1971-5
- OCLC: 276335004
- Dewey Decimal: 813/.54 22
- LC Class: PR9199.3.W4987 J85 2009
- Preceded by: Julian: A Christmas Story

Julian Comstock: A Story of 22nd-Century America is a dystopian speculative fiction novel written by Robert Charles Wilson, and an expansion of Wilson's 2006 novella Julian: A Christmas Story.

== Plot summary ==
In the 22nd century year of 2172, long after the end of the Oil Age, the United States of America has become a neo-Victorian oligarchy, with the reintroduction of feudal indenture, a rigid class hierarchy, property-based representation in the federal United States Senate, de facto hereditary succession of the Presidency, establishment of the "Dominion of Jesus Christ" (premised on evangelicalism and organizationally based at Colorado Springs, Colorado) and the abolition of the Supreme Court. With the evacuation of Washington DC due to an unspecified cataclysm, Manhattan, New York has become the national capital. The United States has also annexed most of Canada and comprises sixty states, but is fighting German-controlled Mitteleuropa ("the Dutch") in the contested territory of Labrador. Climate change and peak oil have caused technological reversion, exacerbated by the Dominion's repressive social policies.

Deklan Comstock, the hereditary President, has already arranged the death of his brother Bryce. The latter's widow, Emily, sends her son Julian to the remote rural western boreal district of Athabaska, where the egalitarian and free-thinking young man befriends Adam Hazzard, a fledgling writer. The two travel east by railroad, but are press-ganged into the "Army of the Laurentians", and are sent to the campaigns in Labrador. Julian becomes a war hero and foils his uncle's machinations. During the celebrations in Manhattan that follow, his actual identity is disclosed. A coup d'etat deposes his uncle and Julian is appointed President. He proceeds to upset the status quo through liberalising censorship policy, rehabilitating the image of Charles Darwin (the authorities have suppressed the ideas of Darwinian evolution in this world) and reimposing separation of church and state as public policy. He also emerges as gay, falling for Magnus, a Unitarian-style minister.

Unfortunately, the Dominion and the armed forces revolt and Julian and Magnus catch "the Pox" and die alongside one another, but Adam and Calyxa, his equally free-thinking and feminist wife, escape to Mediterranean France, where Adam writes his friend's posthumous biography twenty years later, in 2192. Julian Comstock's life parallels that of Julian the Apostate, with the new America being modeled on the Roman Empire. The President is modeled on the Roman Emperor, with the military having significant power in the choice of President (as in the Roman Empire).

== Awards and honors ==
In April 2010, the novel was nominated for the 2010 Hugo Award in the Best Novel category.
