= The Harvest (Wilson novel) =

1992 novel by Robert Charles Wilson

First edition (publ. Bantam Spectra) Cover art by Pamela Lee

The Harvest is a science fiction novel by American-Canadian writer Robert Charles Wilson, first published in 1993.
