= Geoffrey Hoyle =

English science fiction writer (born 1941)

Geoffrey Hoyle (12 January 1941 - 9 September 2024) was an English science fiction writer, who co-wrote with his father, the astronomer Fred Hoyle. About half of Fred Hoyle's science fiction works were co-written with his son.

== Biography ==
He was educated at Bryanston School in Dorset, and then entered Cambridge where he read Economics. After 1964, Hoyle worked in London in the field of modern communications and the film/television industry.

He worked as a scientific advisor to some television series such as Timeslip.

In 2010, his book 2010: Living in the Future was popularised by a blog which compared Hoyle's 38-year-old predictions with the reality of modern life. This led to a Facebook campaign to track down Hoyle and talk to him about his visions.

== Works ==
(Novels unless otherwise specified)

With his father, Fred Hoyle:

- Fifth Planet (1963)
- Rockets in Ursa Major (1969), based on a play by Fred
- Seven Steps to the Sun (1970)
- The Inferno (1973)
- The Molecule Men and the Monster of Loch Ness (1973), short story collection
- Into Deepest Space (1974)
- The Incandescent Ones (1977)
- The Westminster Disaster (1978)
- Commonsense in Nuclear Energy (1980), non-fiction
- The Professor Gamma series
  - The Energy Pirate (1982)
  - The Frozen Planet of Azuron (1982)
  - The Giants of Universal Park (1982)
  - The Planet of Death (1982)

With Janice Robertson:

- Ask Me Why (1976), non-fiction

As sole author:

- 2010: Living in the Future (1972), illustrated by Alasdair Anderson
- Disaster (1975)
- Flight (Achievements) (1984), illustrated by Gerald Witcomb
