= Saeculum =

Unit of time roughly equal to the potential lifetime of a person

A saeculum (plural saecula) is a length of time roughly equal to the potential lifetime of a person or, equivalently, the complete renewal of a human population.

== Background ==
Originally it meant the time from the moment that something happened (for example the founding of a city) until the point in time that all people who had lived at the first moment had died. At that point a new saeculum would start. According to legend, the gods had allotted a certain number of saecula to every people or civilization; the Etruscans, for example, had been given ten saecula.

By the 2nd century BC, Roman historians were using the saeculum to periodize their chronicles and track wars. At the time of the reign of emperor Augustus, the Romans decided that a saeculum was 110 years. In 17 BC, Caesar Augustus organized Ludi saeculares ("saecular games") for the first time to celebrate the "fifth saeculum of Rome". Augustus aimed to link the saeculum with imperial authority.

Emperors such as Claudius and Septimius Severus celebrated the passing of saecula with games at irregular intervals. In 248, Philip the Arab combined Ludi saeculares with the 1,000th anniversary of the founding of Rome. The new millennium that Rome entered was called the saeculum novum, a term that received a metaphysical connotation in Christianity, referring to the worldly age (hence "secular").

Roman emperors legitimised their political authority by referring to the saeculum in various media, linked to a golden age of imperial glory. In response, Christian writers began to define the saeculum as referring to 'this present world', as opposed to the expectation of eternal life in the 'world to come'. This results in the modern sense of 'secular' as 'belonging to the world and its affairs'.

The English word secular, an adjective meaning something happening once in an eon, is derived from the Latin saeculum. The descendants of Latin saeculum in the Romance languages generally mean "century" (i.e., 100 years): French siècle, Spanish siglo, Portuguese século, Italian secolo, Romanian secol, etc.

== See also ==
- Aeon, comparable Greek concept
- Century
- Generation
- In saecula saeculorum
- New world order (politics)
- Social cycle theory
- Strauss–Howe generational theory
- Saeculum obscurum
