= Spin (novel) =

2005 science fiction novel by author Robert Charles Wilson

- Hardcover
- Author: Robert Charles Wilson
- Cover artist: Drive Communications
- Language: English
- Series: Spin / Hypotheticals
- Genre: Science fiction
- Publisher: Tor Books
- Publication date: March 10, 2005
- Publication place: United States
- Media type: Print (Hardcover)
- Pages: 364
- ISBN: 0-7653-0938-6
- OCLC: 56517962
- Dewey Decimal: 813/.54
- LC Class: PR9199.3.W4987 S65 2005
- Followed by: Axis

Spin is a science fiction novel by American-Canadian writer Robert Charles Wilson. It was published in 2005 and won the Hugo Award for Best Novel in 2006. It is the first book in the Spin trilogy, with Axis (the second) published in 2007 and Vortex published in July 2011.

In January 2015, Syfy announced it was developing a six-hour miniseries based on the book.

== Plot ==
The story opens when Tyler Dupree is twelve years old. Tyler and his mother live in a guest house on the property of aerospace millionaire E. D. Lawton and his alcoholic wife, Carol. Tyler is friends with the couple's thirteen-year-old twins: Jason, a brilliant student who is being groomed to take over the family business, and Diane, with whom Tyler falls in love. One night the three children witness all the stars simultaneously disappear. Telecommunications suffer as every satellite falls out of orbit simultaneously.

An opaque black "spin membrane" has been placed around Earth. This slows time so that approximately 3.17 years pass outside the membrane for every second within, or 100 million years for every year. A simulated star on the inside of the membrane allows for a largely normal life to continue. However, the passage of time outside the membrane means that all life on Earth will end in a few decades of subjective Earth time, when the Sun's expansion will make that region of the Solar System uninhabitable.

Jason, now a trained scientist, becomes obsessed with the membrane. He joins Perihelion, an aerospace research firm owned by his father but with close links to the government. Diane joins the quasi-religious "New Kingdom" movement, a Christian sect that endorses hedonism and indulgence, where she meets and later marries Simon Townsend. Tyler attends medical school and becomes a doctor. Jason hires Tyler as a staff physician.

Perihelion terraforms Mars. The process takes millions of years but is finished in months Earth time. When the terraforming is complete, Perihelion and its counterparts in other nations launch crewed colonization missions. Two years after the terraforming process begins, Earth receives satellite images confirming the existence of agriculture and sophisticated human civilizations on Mars.

Suddenly, Mars is enclosed in its own Spin membrane, just as their ambassador Wun Ngo Wen is traveling to Earth to deliver advanced items of nanotechnology. Wun cures Jason of multiple sclerosis elevating him into a new form of life which the Martians term the "fourth stage" and extending his potential lifespan. Perihelion then seeds other Martian nanotechnology throughout the outer Solar System, hopefully to expand gradually to other star systems and discover other similarly time-trapped worlds.

Tyler leaves Perihelion and moves to California. There he gets a desperate call from Simon, stating that Diane is terribly sick. Diane and Simon had moved from the ashes of the NK movement to join a more cult-like fringe movement that was trying to hasten the Second Coming through genetic engineering of cattle. As Tyler heads to meet Diane, the Spin membrane seems to falter and fail, allowing the stars to return to the sky. The next day, the sun rises huge and red in the sky causing terrible heat and high winds. Millions across the world panic as the apparent end has come. Tyler finds Diane suffering from a fatal cardiovascular disease that crossed from cows to humans during the attempts by the religious fringe to breed a totally red calf, which they think will bring out the end of the world. The only cure is to give her the same treatment that Jason has taken. He and Simon drive Diane back to Diane's childhood home where Tyler had hidden some of the Martian biotech. Simon, however, leaves Tyler and Diane and gives them his blessing, and is never seen again. Tyler discovers that Jason is at the house, dying of a mysterious ailment. Jason explains that he has become a human receiver for the nanotechnology they seeded throughout the galaxy. He also explains his conclusions about the nature of the Spin and the Hypotheticals who created it. The Hypotheticals are intelligent Von Neumann machines that spread throughout the galaxy billions of years ago. Horrified at the rise and fall of biological societies, they devised a plan to enclose planets on the verge of societal collapse in Spin membranes to slow their advancement until a way could be found to save them. Jason dies shortly after explaining this and has Tyler mail copies of the information to trusted informants.

Tyler gives the Martian treatment to Diane, who recovers. Shortly after, the membrane partially reasserts itself, allowing the stars to be seen and synchronizing Earth time with that of the universe, but filtering the solar radiation to a survivable level. It's discovered that the Spin membrane had been retracted to let a massive ring descend and embed itself in the Indian Ocean. The "Arch", as it becomes known, acts as a portal to another world, one engineered by the Hypotheticals to give mankind a new chance at life. A decade after the appearance of the Arch, Diane and Tyler, now married, flee from agents of the United States government who seek to arrest them for possessing forbidden Martian technology. Tyler takes the same cure that Jason and Diane did, becoming a "Fourth" himself, and Tyler and Diane pass through the Arch with a group of Indonesian refugees. They scatter Jason's ashes in the crossing between Earth and the other world so that he finally can be at peace.

== Awards ==
- Hugo Award winner, 2006
- John W. Campbell Memorial Award nominee, 2006
- Locus Award nominee, 2006
- Geffen Award (translated science fiction book), 2006
- Kurd-Laßwitz-Preis (foreign fiction), 2007
- Grand Prix de l'Imaginaire (foreign-language novel), 2008
- Seiun Award (best foreign language novel), 2009
