= Element 79 (anthology) =

Science fiction anthology edited by Fred Hoyle

First edition (publ. New American Library) Cover art by Stanislaw Zagorski

Element 79 is a collection of science fiction short stories authored by English astronomer and writer Fred Hoyle and published in 1969. Included in the collection is the eponymous short story, Element 79. The collection takes its name from the atomic number of the seventy-ninth element, gold.

== Contents ==
The anthology includes fifteen short stories:

- Zoomen

The story involves the interactions of a group of largely unrelated humans confined to a compartment complex of an interplanetary spaceship that appears to have collected them as part of an expedition to find and study different planetary species.

- Pym Makes His Point

Pym, a retired university professor of physics, feels dissatisfied with the mediocrity of his lifelong scientific accomplishments, and so accepts a deal with the devil that allows him to contribute a new significant finding to the scientific world.

- The Magnetosphere

On a space expedition to a distant planet, a “life” form manifests itself by dramatically increasing the mental capability of the one crew member who most appreciates the conditions on the new planet.

- A Play's the Thing

A playwright engaged in the process of constructing a play explores plot ideas concerning the sexual relationship of a male university professor with two women.

- Cattle Trucks

The ancient Greek god Dionysus having slept for a few millennia, awakens and visits California of the 1960s where he experiences freeway driving and crowded commercial airline flight.

- Welcome to Slippage City

The deterioration of an unnamed city (obviously Los Angeles) is described as due to a devil's plot, and the experience of an innocent girl at an interplanetary devils convention in the city is related.

- The Ax

An elderly, competent mountain climber, during a descent, reminisces about the mountaineering ax he now uses, and how he had once risked his life to retrieve it.

- Agent 38

The four men aboard a spaceship expedition to circumnavigate the planet Venus are forced to abandon ship by a denizen of the planet, Agent 38.

- The Martians

This story traces an imagined progression of future NASA-funded explorations, first to the Moon and then to Mars. On Mars, human explorers interact indirectly with Martians who live beneath the surface of the planet, but are never seen directly. The Martian lifeforms are not based on biochemistry, as are humans, but do have a vast calculation ability. The Martians use this ability to gradually and systematically dominate human civilization.

- Shortsighted

A bird watcher, driving back from an unsuccessful attempt to sight a member of a rare bird species, accidentally runs into a pair of these birds, killing them.

- A Jury of Five

A two-car collision leads to the death of one male driver, while the other male driver wanders off in a daze. Five individuals who knew one or the other of the two drivers visit the morgue to identity the dead driver. However, before the body is uncovered, the identity of the deceased is in an undetermined state due to a principle in quantum physics. The actual determination, as to who is dead and who is alive, is made, however, on the basis of how the five attendees viewed their relationships to the two drivers.

- Blackmail

An eccentric genius teaches combinations of animals, for example a cat, a dog and a bear, to enjoy the companionship of together watching TV programs such as sports, Westerns, suspense plays, and films of violence.

- Element 79

Meteoroids in interplanetary space undergo a sequence of interactions that results in a particular meteoroid composed of a large quantity of element 79 (gold) landing violently in Scotland. The fragments of the meteorite are collected by the government and subsequently released only in limited amounts in order to maintain gold's value. This process enriches England, allowing it to develop automated technology so that many people, although not out of a job, do not actually have to work.

- The Judgment of Aphrodite

The Greek gods Hermes and Aphrodite sit in judgment over four different bizarre individuals, each representing a different aspect of humanity, to determine which one should be given domination over humanity.

- The Operation

Far in the future of human society, a rebellious young man resists the imposed status quo where all adolescent boys and girls are subjected to brain surgery to promote harmony, individuals are conditioned to be uninterested in sex, and where human populations exist as small isolated communities separated by wilderness areas.

== Reception ==
Joy Williams of The Birmingham News praised the anthology, writing, "the author suspends the reader in a cloud of psychological titillation". In a negative commentary, the Houston Post reviewer Hugh Nations found the author's "writing and plotting skill shrunk by too many scientific treaties". Publishers Weekly wrote, "Fred Hoyle's lively science fiction has special interest because he is a noted astronomer, and his fancies are conjectured from a solid scientific background." In a positive review, C. May of The Tennessean said, "The entire collection is stimulating, fresh and if not literature it is at least as serious as any batch of so-called 'frivolous' writing done recently in the SF field."
