= The Incandescent Ones =

1977 novel by Fred Hoyle and Geoffrey Hoyle

- First edition (US)
- Author: Fred and Geoffrey Hoyle
- Cover artist: Muriel Nasser
- Language: English
- Genre: Science fiction
- Publisher: Harper & Row
- Publication date: May 1977
- Publication place: United Kingdom
- Media type: Print (Hardcover)
- Pages: 183
- ISBN: 0-06-011956-X
- OCLC: 2944877

The Incandescent Ones is a science fiction novel by British astrophysicist Fred Hoyle and his son Geoffrey Hoyle. It was first published in 1977. The novel describes the eventful epic journey of the narrator, which seems to begin as a story of Cold War espionage but, involving life forces beyond Earth, finally leads to Jupiter.

== Plot summary ==
The story is set in a future time where, after civilization decayed because of fuel shortage, the Outlanders came to Earth and provided energy from power beams, one to each of the political blocs; there is world peace because of the threat to cut off the power to either the Eastern or Western Bloc.

Peter, the narrator of the story, lives in Idaho, USA; he is a student of Byzantine art and a part-time ski instructor. His father Anaxagoras, known as Alex, was a grandson of a Russian priest; Alex taught Peter to ski; he disappeared in the mountains while skiing, presumed dead, when Peter was fifteen. Peter arranges to spend a year at a Moscow university; before going, he finds he is being recruited as a spy. In Moscow, after a sequence of planned encounters, he acquires instructions for a journey to Georgia; on the way he is instructed to cross into Turkey by ski via a mountain pass.

In the snow in the mountains of Georgia he meets his father Alex. They continue the journey; during a break Alex heats food with a battery, a source of power which he says would last billions of years. He says that he and Peter are Outlanders; there are two batteries, the one which was in America having been already removed from Earth after humans realized they could be independent of the power beams, which would threaten world peace; the remaining battery must be sent back. Alex says he will not go with him; that Peter is to go over the pass, where he will meet someone he recognizes. Telling Peter to leave and return, he turns up the battery's power and there is a huge explosion which produces a crater and melts the surrounding snow. At the centre of the crater Peter retrieves the battery and continues his journey.

After a difficult crossing of the pass, he finds a mountain hut and meets Edelstam, a physicist whom he once taught to ski back in Idaho; he must be the man Alex mentioned, and presumably an Outlander. He says that the explosion was to make the world powers think the battery was destroyed, and to delay matters with fear of radiation. To cause a diversion, Peter is to continue with a substitute pack instead of the battery, which Edelstam takes away.

In Turkey, Peter is picked up by local people in a truck; there is an explosion, seemingly caused by his replacement pack, and he later finds himself in hospital in Erzerum. Trying to leave the hospital, he is picked up outside and driven to a house in Ankara where he is interrogated by Russians. After eventually giving a muddled account of his contacts, he is given an injection which is meant to kill him; however he is revived and rescued from a coffin by another Outlander, who takes him to a farm to recover. Peter realizes that each Outlander has a particular function.

Peter is taken to a house where there is a gathering of upper-class people, some of whom he supposes are Outlanders; the host receives him as an expert on Byzantine art. He talks to another guest and realizes he is to go to Mars to take part in an energy conference.

From the Outlander space terminal in Anatolia he travels with other conference delegates to Mars; however on arrival he is unexpectedly transferred to another spaceship destined for Jupiter. On this second voyage Peter is accompanied by a Yorkshireman who plays cards extremely well but who seems unable to answer any of his questions. At the end of the journey Peter finds himself in a strange hall close to Jupiter itself.

The hall is empty except for the physicist Edelstam, who has the battery. He says that he himself is not an Outlander, but is there to learn. He says that Outlanders are like robots, each with a speciality; the real power, says Edelstam, is with the Incandescent Ones, who have been around longer than mankind; they operate the power beams, and they control the Outlanders "through ideas in the mind; ideas appear which seem spontaneous, but which are not really so." Peter is different from other Outlanders, "more complex, more all purpose, more given to responding to events as they arise." The Outlanders Peter met regarded him as their boss.

They see on a wall of the room an image of a skier on Jupiter, which seems to be a message from the Incandescent Ones. In a space suit and equipped with the two batteries (one on each ski), Peter skis on Jupiter towards a ball of light; arriving, he realizes he has come home.

== Technical details ==
=== The battery ===
In the mountain hut in Georgia, Edelstam tells Peter that he has a notion of how the battery works, although the details are beyond him. He compares it to an ordinary battery, in which there are changes in how atoms fit themselves into molecules; in the Outlanders' battery he thinks the reconfiguration happens not amongst atoms, but in the nucleus of atoms, which has constituent particles and perhaps an unknown fine structure within that. Such reconfiguration would have the power of an H-bomb, which somehow is tightly controlled in the battery.

The battery has no visible controls; Peter was unable to operate it. Edelstam, talking to Peter near Jupiter, speculates that Alex's specialty as an Outlander was to be able to send signals to the battery.

=== The power beams ===
There are two power beams, which originate in the region of Jupiter and are directed towards the Sun. They are out of the plane of Jupiter's orbit so that they are never intercepted by another planet or asteroid; they are reflected to Earth, one directed to the Eastern Bloc and one to the West. Nuclear research is forbidden on Earth, in order to ensure reliance on the power beams.
