= Axis (novel) =

2007 novel by Robert Charles Wilson

- Hardcover, First Edition
- Author: Robert Charles Wilson
- Cover artist: Dave Seeley
- Language: English
- Series: Spin
- Genre: Science fiction
- Publisher: Tor Books
- Publication date: 2007
- Publication place: United States
- Media type: Print (Hardcover)
- Pages: 303
- ISBN: 978-0765348265
- Dewey Decimal: 813'.54
- LC Class: PR9199.3.W4987A97
- Preceded by: Spin
- Followed by: Vortex

Axis is a science fiction novel by American-Canadian writer Robert Charles Wilson, published in 2007. It is a direct sequel to Wilson's Hugo Award-winning Spin, published two years earlier. The novel was a finalist for the 2008 John W. Campbell Award.

== Plot summary ==
Axis takes place on the new planet introduced at the end of Spin, a world the Hypotheticals engineered to support human life and connected to Earth by way of the Arch that towers hundreds of miles over the Indian Ocean. Humans are colonizing this new world — and, predictably, fiercely exploiting its resources, chiefly large deposits of oil in the western deserts of the continent of Equatoria.

Lise Adams is a young woman attempting to uncover the mystery of her father's disappearance ten years earlier. Turk Findley is an ex-sailor and sometimes-drifter. They come together when showers of cometary dust seed the planet with tiny remnant Hypothetical machines. Soon, this seemingly hospitable world becomes very alien, as the nature of time is once again twisted by entities unknown.

A quasi-religious group of "Fourths" from Earth, led by Dr. Avram Dvali, lives in the desert seeded by falling dust. They've created a child they call Isaac with a Martian upgrade (fatal to adults) that connects him with the Hypotheticals. The Fourth-hunting "Department of Genomic Security" is searching for this group or for a visiting Martian Fourth who disapproves of Isaac's creation.

== Sequel ==
A third book in the series, titled Vortex, was published in July 2011.

== Sources ==
- "Axis". Publishers Weekly 254.31 (6 August 2007): 173–173.
- Schroeder, Regina. "Axis", Booklist 104.1 (September 2007): 65.
- "Axis". Kirkus Reviews 75.13 (July 2007): 8–8.
- Cassada, Jackie. "Axis". Library Journal 132.15 (15 Sep. 2007): 54–55.
