= Blind Lake (novel) =

2003 novel by Robert Charles Wilson

- First edition
- Author: Robert Charles Wilson
- Cover artist: Jim Burns
- Language: English
- Genre: Science fiction
- Publisher: Tor Books
- Publication date: August 2, 2003
- Publication place: United States
- Media type: Print (hardback & paperback)
- Pages: 399
- ISBN: 0-765-30262-4
- OCLC: 51969172
- Dewey Decimal: 813/.54 21
- LC Class: PR9199.3.W4987 B59 2003

Blind Lake is a science fiction novel by Canadian writer Robert Charles Wilson. It was published in 2003, and won a Prix Aurora Award for Best Long Form and was nominated for the Hugo Award for Best Novel, both in 2004.

== Plot summary ==
The novel deals with a government installation at Blind Lake, Minnesota where scientists observe sentient life on a planet 51 light-years away, using telescopes powered by Bose-Einstein condensate-based quantum computers that have advanced beyond human understanding. A sudden and unexplained facility lockdown extends into a long-term quarantine.

The Observation department, observing a civilisation on 47 Ursa Majoris E, headed by Marguerite Hauser tries to carry on with the work of studying the alien life while taking care of her socially-challenged daughter Tess, warding off her ex-husband Ray, and deciding how she feels about houseguest and disgraced journalist Chris. Hauser and her fellow scientists observe everyday life in a city of lobster-like aliens; they cannot contact the aliens in any way and do not understand their language.

Then, without warning, a military cordon is imposed on the Blind Lake site. All communication with the outside world is cut off. Food and other vital supplies are delivered by remote control. The scientists, nevertheless, go on with their research. The ending provides an inconceivable surprise, as it turns out, the alien on 47 Ursa Majoris E has been aware that it has been watched and has in turn been observing the humans at Blind Lake.
