= Bios (novel) =

1999 novel by Robert Charles Wilson

- Cover of first edition (hardcover)
- Author: Robert Charles Wilson
- Language: English
- Genre: Science fiction
- Publisher: Tor Books
- Publication date: 1998
- Publication place: Canada
- Media type: Print (Hardcover & Paperback)
- Pages: 224
- ISBN: 978-0812575743
- Dewey Decimal: 813/.54 21

Bios is a 1999 science fiction novel by Robert Charles Wilson, published by Tor Books. It was a nominee for the 2000 Best Novel Aurora Award.

== Plot summary ==
The novel is set in the 2100s, about a century after a series of pandemics decimate humanity. Existing governments prove to be unable to deal with the crisis and are discredited; their core functions come to be exercised by the Trusts, corporate entities dominated by the oligarchic Families, which function as both business conglomerates and charitable NGOs. Having restored order, the Trusts evolve into a quasi-feudal political structure resembling an enormous worldwide company town, with managerial cadres serving the owner-class Families and having vast authority over their subordinates. The wider solar system also contains a society of asteroid settlers, who did not experience the pandemic crisis; they retain a more liberal mode of existence, and maintain cautious links with the Trusts, cooperating on matters of mutual interest.

Interstellar travel via quantum teleportation is possible, but difficult and hugely expensive; each launch is enormously energy-intensive, consuming a medium-sized Kuiper belt ice body. The Trusts and the asteroid dwellers collaborate to send a large scientific expedition to the planet Isis, the only world found so far to possess a complex biota. A significantly older world than Earth, Isis features a rich ecology which is – like Earth's – DNA-based. However, Isian life violently outcompetes terrestrial biology; any exposure to Isian microorganisms causes death within hours. The human research stations on Isis and the expedition's HQ in orbit must be kept sealed and sterile, with elaborate anti-contamination countermeasure. The world is nonetheless deemed worthy of intensive investigation, as understanding an entire evolutionary process parallel to Earth's could provide important biological insights.

As firsthand research on Isis is extremely difficult, an initiative within the Trusts produces a small group of genetically engineered children specially designed to survive its environment, with enhanced immune systems capable of countering the ravenous Isian microbiome. During a Byzantine power struggle among the Trusts' ruling Families, however, the project is deprecated and the children – all girls – callously disposed of to a brutal orphanage, where most of them die. The sole survivor, Zoe Fisher, is rescued when her patron finally prevails in the inter-Trust power struggle, and is sent to the Isis system, where the researchers are having increasing difficulty maintaining their quarantine. The Isian biota seems to be adapting to their containment measures in ways that seems almost purposeful, with the seeming goal of breaching the seals of the human surface stations.

Zoe is dispatched to one of the surface stations, where she meets and befriends a young man from the asteroid-dweller contingent, and begins making unprotected exploratory trips through the Isian ecology. The marine station is eventually lost when its seals are compromised by a heretofore unknown Isian organism. Some evacuees are quarantined aboard the orbital HQ, where they eventually sicken and die as well, after first experiencing strange hallucinations. The orbital station is found to be contaminated with a microscopic agent capable of tunneling through rubber seals. Its population becomes increasingly ill and erratic; the manager in charge destroys the quantum-entanglement transceiver that is the expedition's only means of communication with Earth. On Isis, the microbiota begins degrading equipment, including the drones and robots necessary for external maintenance of the surface stations. Zoe's patron arrives on a quantum transport, and assumes command of the expedition. With evacuation of the surface stations looming, Zoe is sent on a last-ditch effort to investigate the "diggers," a primitive Isian species that is suspected to be near-sentient.

Zoe encounters the diggers, but the poor condition of her escorting drones makes them unable to intervene when the diggers assault and abduct her. The surface station is abandoned; Zoe's asteroid-dweller friend (who has become her lover) stays behind, going on a hopeless mission in a suit of hazmat armor to rescue her. He finds Zoe dying inside the diggers' underground colony; his own suit breached, they wait to die together. In space, the inhabitants of the orbital station quietly die. Its badly-ill and no longer rational manager attempts to launch the expedition's only Earth-return vehicle to evacuate the senior staff, but all of them also die during the shuttle ride out to it. Meanwhile, a feverish Zoe experiences a hallucinatory quantum link with a Gaian super-organism consisting of not only all the life of Isis, but a vast number of worlds throughout the galaxy whose life shares a common origin via panspermia, all of them sharing a connection on a quantum level. This line of descent includes Earth life, which however descends from a genetically damaged branch in which the quantum link has been broken. The emergent intelligence cherishes the sentient life that occasionally evolves on its worlds, and regrets that it cannot communicate with humans or control the virulence of the Isian biome. Zoe, her lover, and – it is implied – all the humans who had died after being infected by Isis are "remembered" by the super-organism, in a sense living forever within the immortal quantum "cloud."

The remaining ground stations fail one by one. Zoe's patron – having been implanted with the same experimental anti-Isian-life countermeasures before leaving Earth – is left alone on the slowly deteriorating orbital station, as the only living human in the Isis system.

In a distant epilogue, a second Earth expedition arrives a century later. It is revealed that the Trusts have fallen, and a more humane regime now rules the Solar System. The new arrivals have advanced synthetic immune systems that make it possible for them to live on Isis without protection.

== Publication history ==
- First hardcover edition, 1999, Tor Books, ISBN 978-0812575743.
