= Robert Charles Wilson =

American-Canadian science fiction author (born 1953)

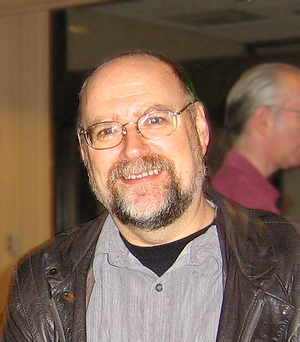
- Wilson in 2010
- Born: December 15, 1953 (age 72); California, U.S.
- Occupation: Author
- Spouse: Sharry Wilson
- Children: 2
- Writing career
- Years active: 1985-present
- Genre: Science fiction
- Website: robertcharleswilson.com

Robert Charles Wilson (born December 15, 1953) is an American-Canadian science fiction author.

== Career ==
Wilson's first publication, "Equinocturne", appeared in the February 1975 issue of Analog Science Fiction, under the name Bob Chuck Wilson.

His early novels were published between the mid-1980s and mid-1990s and received nominations for the Philip K. Dick Award and the Aurora Award for Best Novel. In 1995, Mysterium won the Philip K. Dick Award for best original paperback, and in 1996 he won the Aurora Award for Best Short Fiction for "The Perseids".

Starting in 1998, many of his books (including Darwinia, Blind Lake, and the Spin trilogy) have been edited by Teresa Nielsen Hayden of Tor Books.

In 2000, his first collection of short stories was published, The Perseids and Other Stories, set in Toronto.

In 2005, he published his best known novel, Spin, the first in a trilogy that continued with Axis (2007) and Vortex (2011). Spin won the Hugo Award for Best Novel in 2006 and was included in the Tor Essentials series in 2020.

In 2007, author Stephen King called Wilson "probably the finest science-fiction author now writing".

Wilson's literary agent is Shawna McCarthy and his most recent novel, Last Year, was published December 6, 2016.

== Personal life ==
Wilson was born in the United States in California, but grew up near Toronto, Ontario. Apart from another short period in the early 1970s spent in Whittier, California, he has lived most of his life in Canada, and in 2007 he became a Canadian citizen. He resided for a while in Nanaimo, British Columbia, and briefly in Vancouver. Currently he lives with his wife Sharry in Concord, a neighbourhood of Vaughan, Ontario located north of Toronto. He has two sons, Paul and Devon.

== Awards and honours ==
- 1995: Philip K. Dick Award for Mysterium
- 1996: Aurora Award for Best Short Fiction for "The Perseids"
- 1999: Aurora Award for Best Novel for Darwinia
- 2002: John W. Campbell Memorial Award for Best Science Fiction Novel for The Chronoliths
- 2004: Aurora Award for Best Novel for Blind Lake
- 2006: Hugo Award for Best Novel for Spin
- 2007: Theodore Sturgeon Award for "The Cartesian Theater"

== Bibliography ==
=== Novels ===
- A Hidden Place (Bantam Spectra, 1986)
  - Nominated for the Philip K. Dick Award for best original paperback, 1986
- Memory Wire (Bantam Spectra, 1988)
- Gypsies (Doubleday, 1989)
- The Divide (Doubleday, 1990)
- A Bridge of Years (Doubleday, 1991)
  - Nominated for the Philip K. Dick Award for best original paperback, 1991
- The Harvest (Bantam Spectra, 1993)
- Mysterium (Bantam Spectra, 1994)
  - Winner of the Philip K. Dick Award for best original paperback, 1994
- Darwinia (Tor, 1998)
  - Nominated for the Hugo and Locus SF Awards for Best Novel, 1999
- Bios (Tor, 1999)
- The Chronoliths (Tor, 2001)
  - Winner of the Campbell Award, nominated for the Hugo and Locus SF Awards for Best Novel, 2001
- Blind Lake (Tor, 2003)
  - Nominated for the Hugo Award for Best Novel, 2004
- Magic Time: Ghostlands (2004, with Marc Scott Zicree)
- Julian Comstock: A Story of 22nd-Century America (Tor, 2009)
  - Nominated for the Hugo Award for Best Novel, 2010
- Burning Paradise (Tor, 2013)
- The Affinities (Tor, 2015)
- Last Year (Tor, 2016)
- Forty Million Summers (Tachyon Publications, 2027)

==== Spin series ====
- Spin (Tor, 2005)
  - Winner of the Hugo Award for Best Novel, nominated for Campbell and Locus SF Awards, 2006
  - On 2006-10-12 won the Geffen Award as the Best Translated SF Novel in Israel for 2006.
  - In 2007 won the Kurd-Laßwitz-Preis as the Best Foreign Fiction of the Year for 2006.
  - In 2009 won the Seiun Award as the Best Foreign Language Novel of the Year in Japan for 2008.
- Axis (Tor, 2007)
  - Nominated for the John W. Campbell Award, 2008
- Vortex (Tor, 2011)
  - A Spin and Axis sequel published on July 5, 2011

=== Short stories and novellas ===
- The Perseids and Other Stories (Tor, 2000)
  - includes "Divided by Infinity" (1998)
- Julian: A Christmas Story (PS Publishing, 2006)
  - Nominated for Hugo Award for Best Novella, 2007

=== Nonfiction ===
- Owning the Unknown: A Science Fiction Writer Explores Atheism, Agnosticism, and the Idea of God (2023)

=== Anthology ===
- Tesseracts Ten with Edo van Belkom (2006)

== Critical studies, reviews and biography ==
- West, Michelle (Jun 2000). "[Review of 'Bios']". Musing on Books. F&SF. 98 (6): 41–46. Archived from the original on December 27, 2004.
