= Fred Hoyle =

English astronomer (1915–2001)

Sir Fred Hoyle FRS
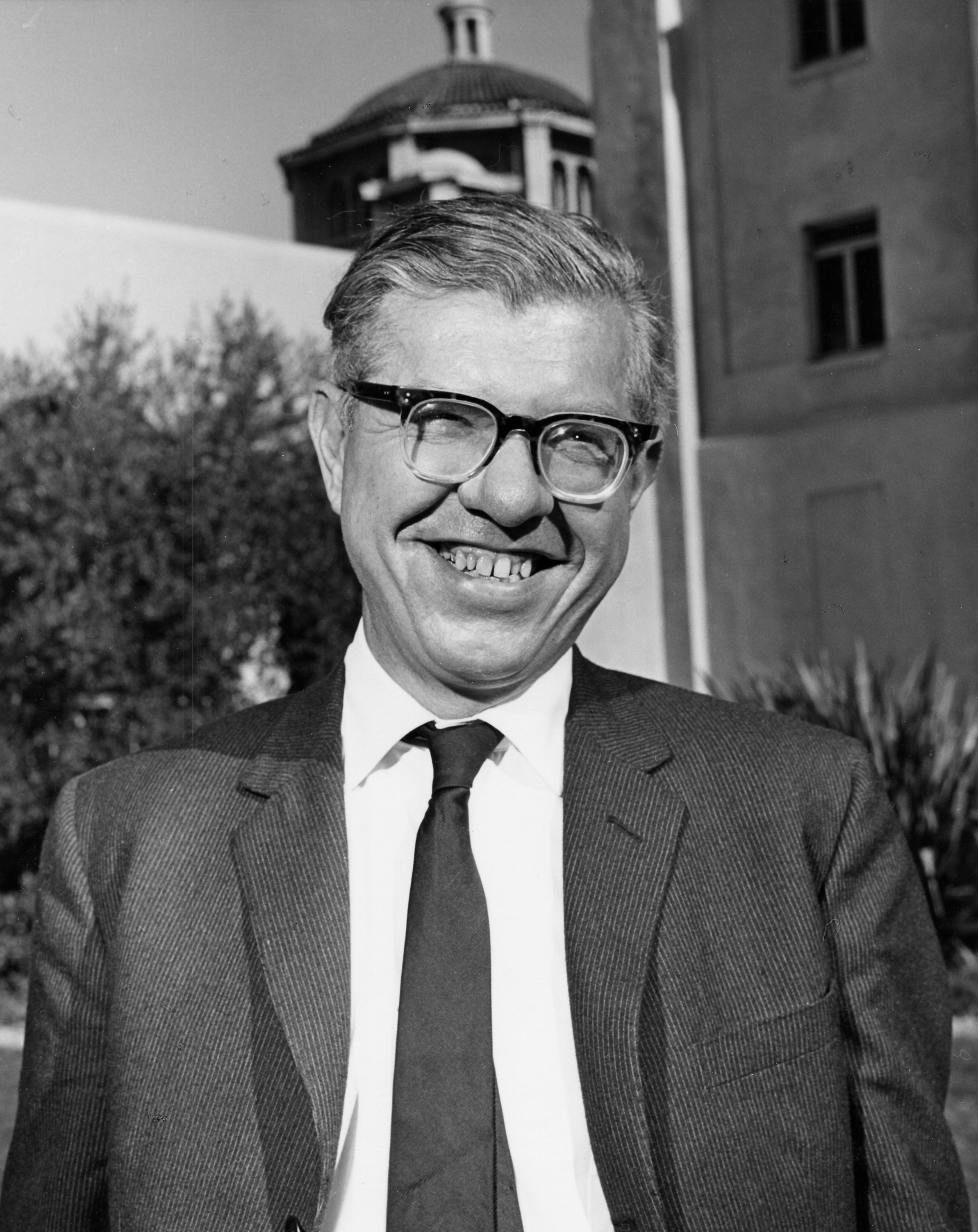
- Hoyle in 1967
- Born: 24 June 1915; Gilstead, Bingley, West Riding of Yorkshire, England
- Died: 20 August 2001 (aged 86); Bournemouth, England
- Education: Emmanuel College, Cambridge
- Known for: Coining the phrase 'Big Bang'; Steady-state theory Stellar nucleosynthesis theory Triple-alpha process Panspermia; Hoyle state Hoyle's fallacy Hoyle's model B^{2}FH paper Hoyle–Narlikar theory Bondi–Hoyle–Lyttleton accretion
- Spouse: Barbara Clark (m. 1939)
- Children: Geoffrey Hoyle; Elizabeth Butler
- Relatives: Samantha Butler (grandchild)
- Awards: Mayhew Prize (1936); Smith's Prize (1938); FRS (1957); Rittenhouse Medal (1960); Kalinga Prize (1967); Bakerian Medal (1968); RAS Gold Medal (1968); Jansky Lectureship (1969); Bruce Medal (1970); Henry Norris Russell Lectureship (1971); Royal Medal (1974); Balzan Prize (1994); Klumpke-Roberts Award (1977); Crafoord Prize (1997)
- Scientific career
- Fields: Astronomy
- Workplaces: St John's College, Cambridge; Institute of Astronomy, Cambridge
- Academic advisors: Rudolf Peierls; Maurice Pryce; Philip Worsley Wood
- Doctoral students: John Moffat; Chandra Wickramasinghe; Cyril Domb; Jayant Narlikar; Leon Mestel; Peter Alan Sweet; Sverre Aarseth
- Other notable students: Paul C. W. Davies; Douglas Gough

Sir Fred Hoyle (24 June 1915 – 20 August 2001) was an English astronomer. With Margaret and Geoffrey Burbidge and William Alfred Fowler, he formulated the theory of stellar nucleosynthesis in the influential B^{2}FH paper.

He held controversial views on some scientific matters – in particular, in his rejection of the "Big Bang" theory (a term he jokingly coined on BBC Radio, though he later denied doing so in derision) in favour of a "steady-state model", and his promotion of panspermia as the origin of life on Earth.

He spent most of his working life at St John's College, Cambridge, and served as the founding director of the Institute of Theoretical Astronomy at Cambridge.

Hoyle also wrote science fiction novels, short stories, and radio plays, co-created television serials, and, with his son, Geoffrey Hoyle, co-authored twelve books.

== Biography ==
=== Early life ===
Hoyle was born near Bingley in Gilstead, West Riding of Yorkshire, England. His father Ben Hoyle was a violinist and worked in the wool trade in Bradford, and served as a machine gunner in the First World War. His mother, Mabel Pickard, had studied music at the Royal College of Music in London and later worked as a cinema pianist. Hoyle was educated at Bingley Grammar School and read mathematics at Emmanuel College, Cambridge. As a youth, he sang in the choir at the local Anglican church.

In 1936, Hoyle shared the Mayhew Prize with George Stanley Rushbrooke.

=== Career ===
In late 1940, Hoyle left Cambridge to go to Portsmouth to work for the Admiralty on radar research, for example, devising a method to get the altitude of incoming aeroplanes. He was also put in charge of countermeasures against the radar-guided guns found on the Graf Spee after its scuttling in the River Plate. Britain's radar project was a large-scale operation, and was probably the inspiration for the large British project in Hoyle's novel The Black Cloud. Two colleagues in this war work were Hermann Bondi and Thomas Gold, and the three had many discussions on cosmology. The radar work involved several trips to North America, where he took the opportunity to visit astronomers. On one trip to the US, he learned about supernovae at Caltech and Mount Palomar and, in Canada, the nuclear physics of plutonium implosion and explosion, noticed some similarity between the two and started thinking about supernova nucleosynthesis. He had an intuition at the time "I will make a name for myself if this works out" (he published his prescient and groundbreaking paper in 1954). He also formed a group at Cambridge exploring stellar nucleosynthesis in ordinary stars and was bothered by the paucity of stellar carbon production in existing models. He noticed that one existing process would be made a billion times more productive if the carbon-12 nucleus had a resonance at 7.7 MeV, but nuclear physicists at the time omitted such an observed value. On another trip, he visited the nuclear physics group at Caltech, spent a few months of sabbatical there and persuaded them against their scepticism to find the Hoyle state in carbon-12, from which a full theory of stellar nucleosynthesis was developed, co-authored by Hoyle and members of the Caltech group.

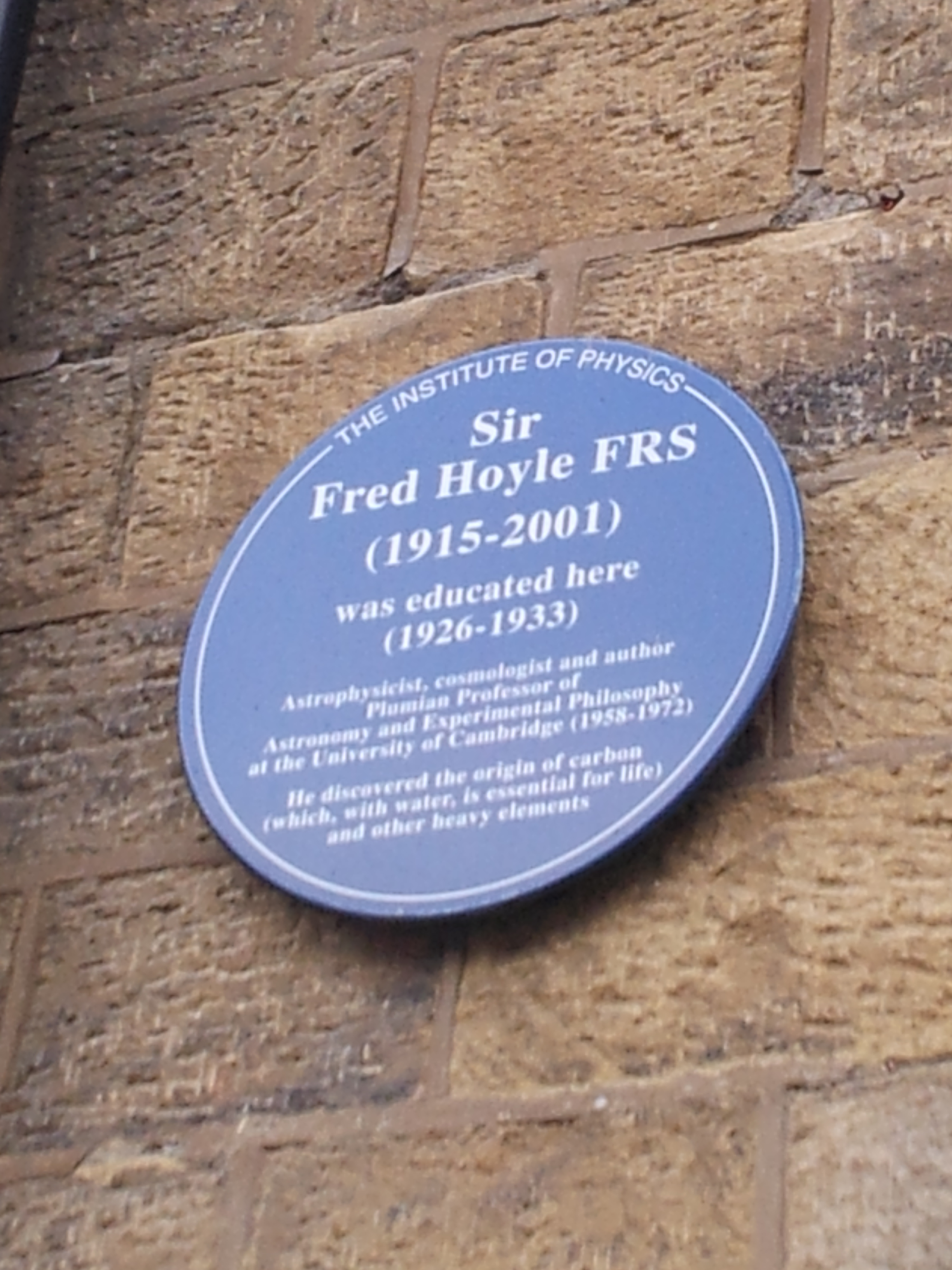
Blue plaque at Bingley Grammar School commemorating Hoyle

In 1945, after the war ended, Hoyle returned to Cambridge University as a lecturer at St John's College, Cambridge (where he had been a Fellow since 1939). Hoyle's Cambridge years, 1945–1973, saw him rise to the top of world astrophysics theory, on the basis of a startling originality of ideas covering a wide range of topics. In 1958, Hoyle was appointed Plumian Professor of Astronomy and Experimental Philosophy in Cambridge University. In 1967, he became the founding director of the Institute of Theoretical Astronomy (subsequently renamed the Institute of Astronomy, Cambridge), where his innovative leadership quickly led to this institution becoming one of the premier groups in the world for theoretical astrophysics. In 1971, he was invited to deliver the MacMillan Memorial Lecture to the Institution of Engineers and Shipbuilders in Scotland. He chose the subject "Astronomical Instruments and their Construction". Hoyle was knighted in the 1972 New Year Honours.

Although the occupant of two distinguished offices, by 1972 Hoyle had become unhappy with his life in Cambridge. A dispute over election to a professorial chair led to Hoyle resigning as Plumian professor in 1972. The following year he also resigned the directorship of the institute. Explaining his actions, he later wrote: "I do not see any sense in continuing to skirmish on a battlefield where I can never hope to win. The Cambridge system is effectively designed to prevent one ever establishing a directed policy – key decisions can be upset by ill-informed and politically motivated committees. To be effective in this system one must for ever be watching one's colleagues, almost like a Robespierre spy system. If one does so, then of course little time is left for any real science."

After leaving Cambridge, Hoyle wrote several popular science and science fiction books, as well as presenting lectures around the world, partly to provide a means of support. Hoyle was still a member of the joint policy committee (since 1967), during the planning stage for the 150-inch Anglo-Australian Telescope at Siding Spring Observatory in New South Wales. He became chairman of the Anglo-Australian Telescope board in 1973, and presided at its inauguration in 1974 by Charles, Prince of Wales.

=== Decline and death ===
After his resignation from Cambridge in 1972, Hoyle moved to the Lake District and occupied his time with treks across the moors, writing books, visiting research centres around the world, and working on science ideas (that have been largely rejected); the topics he wrote about include "Stonehenge, panspermia, Darwinism, paleontology, and viruses from space". On 24 November 1997, while hiking across moorlands in west Yorkshire, near his childhood home in Gilstead, Hoyle fell into a steep ravine called Shipley Glen. He was located about 12 hours later by a party using search dogs. He was hospitalised for two months with a broken shoulder bone. In 2001, he suffered a series of strokes and died in Bournemouth on 20 August of that year.

== Views and contributions ==
=== Origin of nucleosynthesis ===
Hoyle authored the first two research papers ever published on synthesis of chemical elements heavier than helium by stellar nuclear reactions. The first of these in 1946 showed that cores of stars will evolve to temperatures of billions of degrees, much hotter than temperatures considered for thermonuclear origin of stellar power in main-sequence stars. Hoyle showed that at such high temperatures the element iron can become much more abundant than other heavy elements owing to thermal equilibrium among nuclear particles, explaining the high natural abundance of iron. This idea would later be called the e Process. Hoyle's second foundational nucleosynthesis publication, published in 1954, showed that the elements between carbon and iron cannot be synthesised by such equilibrium processes. He attributed those elements to specific nuclear fusion reactions between abundant constituents in concentric shells of evolved massive, pre-supernova stars. This startlingly modern picture is the accepted paradigm today for the supernova nucleosynthesis of these primary elements. In the mid-1950s, Hoyle became the leader of a group of talented experimental and theoretical physicists who met in Cambridge: William Alfred Fowler, Margaret Burbidge, and Geoffrey Burbidge. This group systematised basic ideas of how all the chemical elements in our universe were created, with this now being a field called nucleosynthesis. Famously, in 1957, this group produced the B^{2}FH paper (known for the initials of the four authors) in which the field of nucleosynthesis was organised into complementary nuclear processes. They added much new material on the synthesis of heavy elements by neutron-capture reactions, the so-called s process and the r process. So influential did the B^{2}FH paper become that for the remainder of the twentieth century it became the default citation of almost all researchers wishing to cite an accepted origin for nucleosynthesis theory, and as a result, the path-breaking Hoyle 1954 paper fell into obscurity. Historical research in the 21st century has brought Hoyle's 1954 paper back to scientific prominence. Those historical arguments were first presented to a gathering of nucleosynthesis experts attending a 2007 conference at Caltech organised after the deaths of both Fowler and Hoyle to celebrate the 50th anniversary of the publication of B^{2}FH. Ironically the B^{2}FH paper did not review Hoyle's 1954 supernova-shells attribution of the origin of elements between silicon and iron despite Hoyle's co-authorship of B^{2}FH. Based on his many personal discussions with Hoyle Donald D. Clayton has attributed this seemingly inexplicable oversight in B^{2}FH to the lack of proofreading by Hoyle of the draft composed at Caltech in 1956 by G. R. Burbidge and E. M. Burbidge.

The second of Hoyle's nucleosynthesis papers also introduced an interesting use of the anthropic principle, which was not then known by that name. In trying to work out the steps of stellar nucleosynthesis, Hoyle calculated that one particular nuclear reaction, the triple-alpha process, which generates carbon from helium, would require the carbon nucleus to have a very specific resonance energy and spin for it to work. The large amount of carbon in the universe, which makes it possible for carbon-based life-forms of any kind to exist, demonstrated to Hoyle that this nuclear reaction must work. Based on this notion, Hoyle therefore predicted the values of the energy, the nuclear spin and the parity of the compound state in the carbon nucleus formed by three alpha particles (helium nuclei), which was later borne out by experiment.

This energy level, while needed to produce carbon in large quantities, was statistically very unlikely to fall where it does in the scheme of carbon energy levels. Hoyle later wrote:

Would you not say to yourself, "Some super-calculating intellect must have designed the properties of the carbon atom, otherwise the chance of my finding such an atom through the blind forces of nature would be utterly minuscule. A common sense interpretation of the facts suggests that a superintellect has monkeyed with physics, as well as with chemistry and biology, and that there are no blind forces worth speaking about in nature. The numbers one calculates from the facts seem to me so overwhelming as to put this conclusion almost beyond question."

— Fred Hoyle

His co-worker William Alfred Fowler eventually won the Nobel Prize for Physics in 1983 (with Subrahmanyan Chandrasekhar), but Hoyle's original contribution was overlooked by the electors, and many were surprised that such a notable astronomer missed out. Fowler himself in an autobiographical sketch affirmed Hoyle's pioneering efforts:

The concept of nucleosynthesis in stars was first established by Hoyle in 1946. This provided a way to explain the existence of elements heavier than helium in the universe, basically by showing that critical elements such as carbon could be generated in stars and then incorporated in other stars and planets when that star "dies". The new stars formed now start off with these heavier elements and even heavier elements are formed from them. Hoyle theorized that other rarer elements could be explained by supernovas, the giant explosions which occasionally occur throughout the universe, whose temperatures and pressures would be required to create such elements.

— William Fowler

=== Rejection of the Big Bang ===
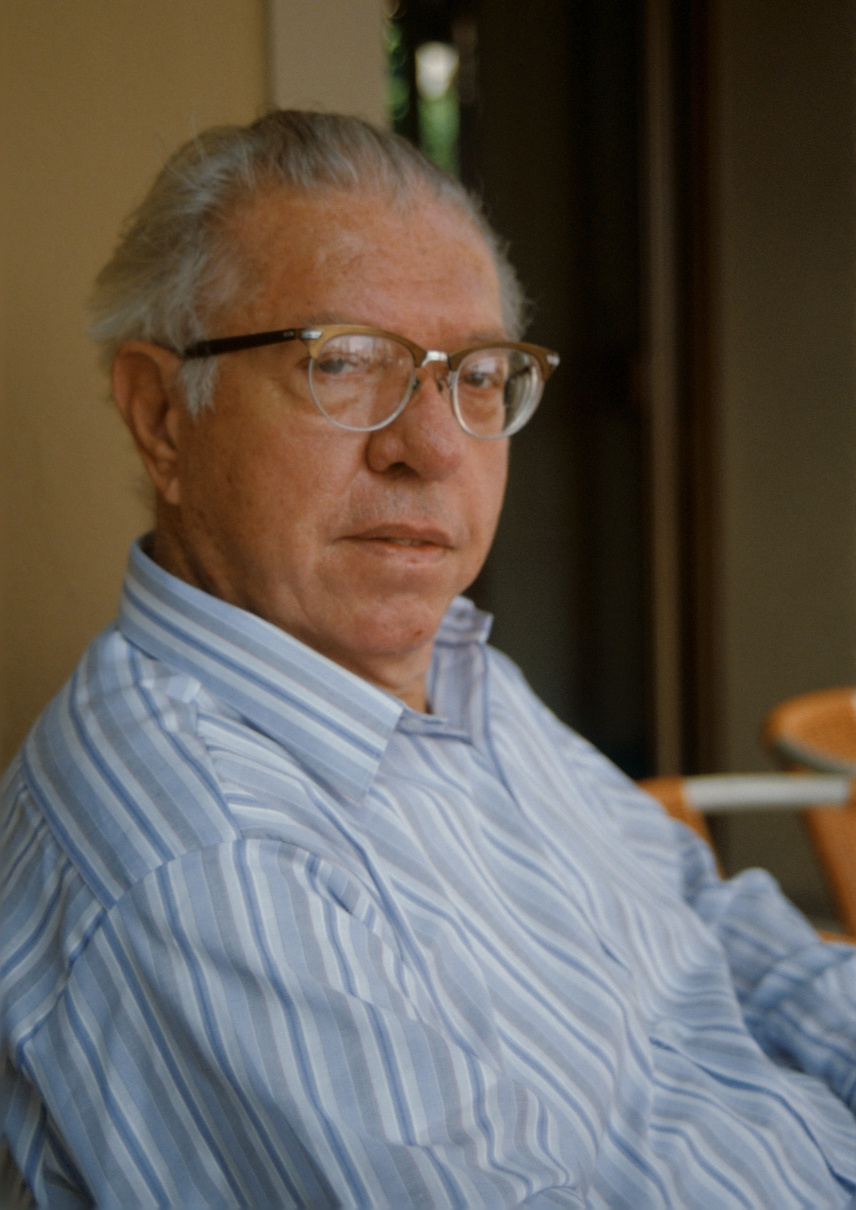
Hoyle in 1988

While having no argument with the Lemaître theory (later confirmed by Edwin Hubble's observations) that the universe was expanding, Hoyle disagreed on its interpretation. He found the idea that the universe had a beginning to be pseudoscience, resembling arguments for a creator, "for it's an irrational process, and can't be described in scientific terms" (see Kalam cosmological argument). Instead, Hoyle, along with Thomas Gold and Hermann Bondi (with whom he had worked on radar in the Second World War), in 1948 began to argue for the universe as being in a "steady state" and formulated their Steady State theory. The theory tried to explain how the universe could be eternal and essentially unchanging while still having the galaxies we observe moving away from each other. The theory hinged on the creation of matter between galaxies over time, so that even though galaxies get further apart, new ones that develop between them fill the space they leave. The resulting universe is in a "steady state" in the same manner that a flowing river is – the individual water molecules are moving away but the overall river remains the same.

The theory was one alternative to the Big Bang which, like the Big Bang, agreed with key observations of the day, namely Hubble's red shift observations, and Hoyle was a strong critic of the Big Bang. He coined the term "Big Bang" on BBC radio's Third Programme broadcast on 28 March 1949. It was said by George Gamow and his opponents that Hoyle intended to be pejorative, and the script from which he read aloud was interpreted by his opponents to be "vain, one-sided, insulting, not worthy of the BBC". Hoyle explicitly denied that he was being insulting and said it was just a striking image meant to emphasise the difference between the two theories for the radio audience. In another BBC interview, he said, "The reason why scientists like the "Big Bang" is because they are overshadowed by the Book of Genesis. It is deep within the psyche of most scientists to believe in the first page of Genesis".

Hoyle had a famously heated argument with Martin Ryle of the Cavendish Radio Astronomy Group about Hoyle's steady state theory, which somewhat restricted collaboration between the Cavendish group and the Cambridge Institute of Astronomy during the 1960s.

Hoyle, unlike Gold and Bondi, offered an explanation for the appearance of new matter by postulating the existence of what he dubbed the "creation field", or just the "C-field", which had negative pressure in order to be consistent with the conservation of energy and drive the expansion of the universe. This C-field is the same as the later "de Sitter solution" for cosmic inflation, but the C-field model acts much slower than the de Sitter inflation model. They jointly argued that continuous creation was no more inexplicable than the appearance of the entire universe from nothing, although it had to be done on a regular basis. In the end, mounting observational evidence convinced most cosmologists that the steady-state model was incorrect and that the Big Bang theory agreed better with observations, although Hoyle continued to support and develop his theory. In 1993, in an attempt to explain some of the evidence against the steady-state theory, he presented a modified version called "quasi-steady state cosmology" (QSS), but the theory is not widely accepted.

The evidence that resulted in the Big Bang's victory over the steady-state model included discovery of cosmic microwave background radiation in the 1960s, and the distribution of "young galaxies" and quasars throughout the Universe in the 1980s indicate a more consistent age estimate of the universe. Hoyle died in 2001 having never accepted the validity of the Big Bang theory.

How, in the big-bang cosmology, is the microwave background explained? Despite what supporters of big-bang cosmology claim, it is not explained. The supposed explanation is nothing but an entry in the gardener's catalogue of hypothesis that constitutes the theory. Had observation given 27 Kelvins instead of 2.7 Kelvins for the temperature, then 27 kelvins would have been entered in the catalogue. Or 0.27 Kelvins. Or anything at all.

— Hoyle, 1994

=== Theory of gravity ===
Together with Narlikar, Hoyle developed a particle theory in the 1960s, the Hoyle–Narlikar theory of gravity. It made predictions that were roughly the same as Einstein's general relativity, but it incorporated Mach's Principle, which Einstein had tried but failed to incorporate in his theory. The Hoyle-Narlikar theory fails several tests, including consistency with the microwave background. It was motivated by their belief in the steady-state model of the universe.

=== Rejection of Earth-based abiogenesis ===
In his later years, Hoyle became a staunch critic of theories of abiogenesis to explain the origin of life on Earth. With Chandra Wickramasinghe, Hoyle promoted the hypothesis that the first life on Earth began in space, spreading through the universe via panspermia, and that evolution on Earth is influenced by a steady influx of viruses arriving via comets. His belief that comets had a significant percentage of organic compounds was well ahead of his time, as the dominant views in the 1970s and 1980s were that comets largely consisted of water-ice, and the presence of organic compounds was then highly controversial. Wickramasinghe wrote in 2003: "In the highly polarized polemic between Darwinism and creationism, our position is unique. Although we do not align ourselves with either side, both sides treat us as opponents. Thus we are outsiders with an unusual perspective – and our suggestion for a way out of the crisis has not yet been considered."

Hoyle and Wickramasinghe advanced several instances where they say outbreaks of illnesses on Earth are of extraterrestrial origins, including the 1918 flu pandemic, and certain outbreaks of polio and mad cow disease. For the 1918 flu pandemic, they hypothesized that cometary dust brought the virus to Earth simultaneously at multiple locations – a view almost universally dismissed by experts on this pandemic. In 1982, Hoyle presented Evolution from Space for the Royal Institution's Omni Lecture. After considering what he thought of as a very remote possibility of Earth-based abiogenesis he concluded:

If one proceeds directly and straightforwardly in this matter, without being deflected by a fear of incurring the wrath of scientific opinion, one arrives at the conclusion that biomaterials with their amazing measure of order must be the outcome of intelligent design. No other possibility I have been able to think of...

— Fred Hoyle

Published in his 1982/1984 books Evolution from Space (co-authored with Chandra Wickramasinghe), Hoyle calculated that the chance of obtaining the required set of enzymes for even the simplest living cell without panspermia was one in 10^{40,000}. Since the number of atoms in the known universe is infinitesimally tiny by comparison (10^{80}), he argued that Earth as life's place of origin could be ruled out. He claimed:

The notion that not only the biopolymer but the operating program of a living cell could be arrived at by chance in a primordial organic soup here on the Earth is evidently nonsense of a high order.

Though Hoyle declared himself an atheist, this apparent suggestion of a guiding hand led him to the conclusion that "a superintellect has monkeyed with physics, as well as with chemistry and biology, and ... there are no blind forces worth speaking about in nature." He would go on to compare the random emergence of even the simplest cell without panspermia to the likelihood that "a tornado sweeping through a junk-yard might assemble a Boeing 747 from the materials therein" and to compare the chance of obtaining even a single functioning protein by chance combination of amino acids to a solar system full of blind men solving Rubik's Cubes simultaneously. This is known as "the junkyard tornado", or "Hoyle's Fallacy". Those who advocate the intelligent design (ID) philosophy sometimes cite Hoyle's work in this area to support the claim that the universe was fine tuned to allow intelligent life to be possible.

=== Other opinions ===
While Hoyle was well-regarded for his works on nucleosynthesis and science popularisation, he held positions on a wide range of scientific issues that were in direct opposition to the prevailing theories of the scientific community. Paul Davies describes how he "loved his maverick personality and contempt for orthodoxy", quoting Hoyle as saying "I don't care what they think" about his theories on discrepant redshift, and "it is better to be interesting and wrong than boring and right".

Hoyle often expressed anger against the labyrinthine and petty politics at Cambridge and frequently feuded with members and institutions of all levels of the British astronomy community, leading to his resignation from Cambridge in September 1971 over the way he thought Donald Lynden-Bell was chosen to replace retiring professor Roderick Oliver Redman behind his back. According to biographer Simon Mitton, Hoyle was crestfallen because he felt that his colleagues at Cambridge were unsupportive.

In addition to his views on steady state theory and panspermia, Hoyle also supported the following controversial hypotheses and speculations:

- The correlation of flu epidemics with the sunspot cycle, with epidemics occurring at the minimum of the cycle. The idea was that flu contagion was scattered in the interstellar medium and reached Earth only when the solar wind had minimum power.
- Two fossil Archaeopteryx were man-made fakes.
- The theory of abiogenic petroleum, held by Hoyle and by Thomas Gold, where natural hydrocarbons (oil and natural gas) are explained as the result of deep carbon deposits, instead of fossilised organic material. This theory is dismissed by the mainstream petroleum geochemistry community.
- In his 1977 book On Stonehenge, Hoyle supported Gerald Hawkins's proposal that the fifty-six Aubrey holes at Stonehenge were used as a system for Neolithic Britons to predict eclipses, using them in the daily positioning of marker stones. Using the Aubrey holes for predicting lunar eclipses was originally proposed by Gerald Hawkins in his book of the subject Stonehenge Decoded (1965).

=== Nobel Prize for Physics ===
Hoyle was also at the centre of two unrelated controversies involving the politics for selecting recipients of the Nobel Prize for Physics. The first arose when the 1974 prize went in part to Antony Hewish for his leading role in the discovery of pulsars. Hoyle made an off-the-cuff remark to a reporter in Montreal that "Yes, Jocelyn Bell was the actual discoverer, not Hewish, who was her supervisor, so she should have been included." This remark received widespread international coverage. Worried about being misunderstood, Hoyle carefully composed a letter of explanation to The Times.

The 1983 prize went in part to William Alfred Fowler "for his theoretical and experimental studies of the nuclear reactions of importance in the formation of the chemical elements in the universe" despite Hoyle having been the inventor of the theory of nucleosynthesis in the stars with two research papers published shortly after WWII. So some suspicion arose that Hoyle was denied the third share of this prize because of his earlier public disagreement with the 1974 award. British scientist Harry Kroto later said that the Nobel Prize is not just an award for a piece of work, but a recognition of a scientist's overall reputation and Hoyle's championing many disreputable and disproven ideas may have invalidated him. In his obituary, Nature editor and fellow steady-state-universe supporter John Maddox called it "shameful" that Fowler had been rewarded with a Nobel prize and Hoyle had not.

Because of his many unorthodox views, Hoyle was described as "the scientist whose rudeness cost him a Nobel prize"; Donald D. Clayton wrote that "He made himself look like a sorehead who only cared about the steady state universe and life from outer space. … He made himself look foolish."

== Media appearances ==
Hoyle appeared in a series of radio talks on astronomy for the BBC in the 1950s; these were collected in the book The Nature of the Universe, and he went on to write a number of other popular science books.

In the play Sur la route de Montalcino, the character of Fred Hoyle confronts Georges Lemaître on a fictional journey to the Vatican in 1957.

Hoyle appeared in the 1973 short film Take the World From Another Point of View.

In the 2004 television movie Hawking, Fred Hoyle is played by Peter Firth. In the movie, Stephen Hawking (played by Benedict Cumberbatch) publicly confronts Hoyle at a Royal Society lecture in summer 1964, about a mistake he found in his latest publication.

== Honours ==
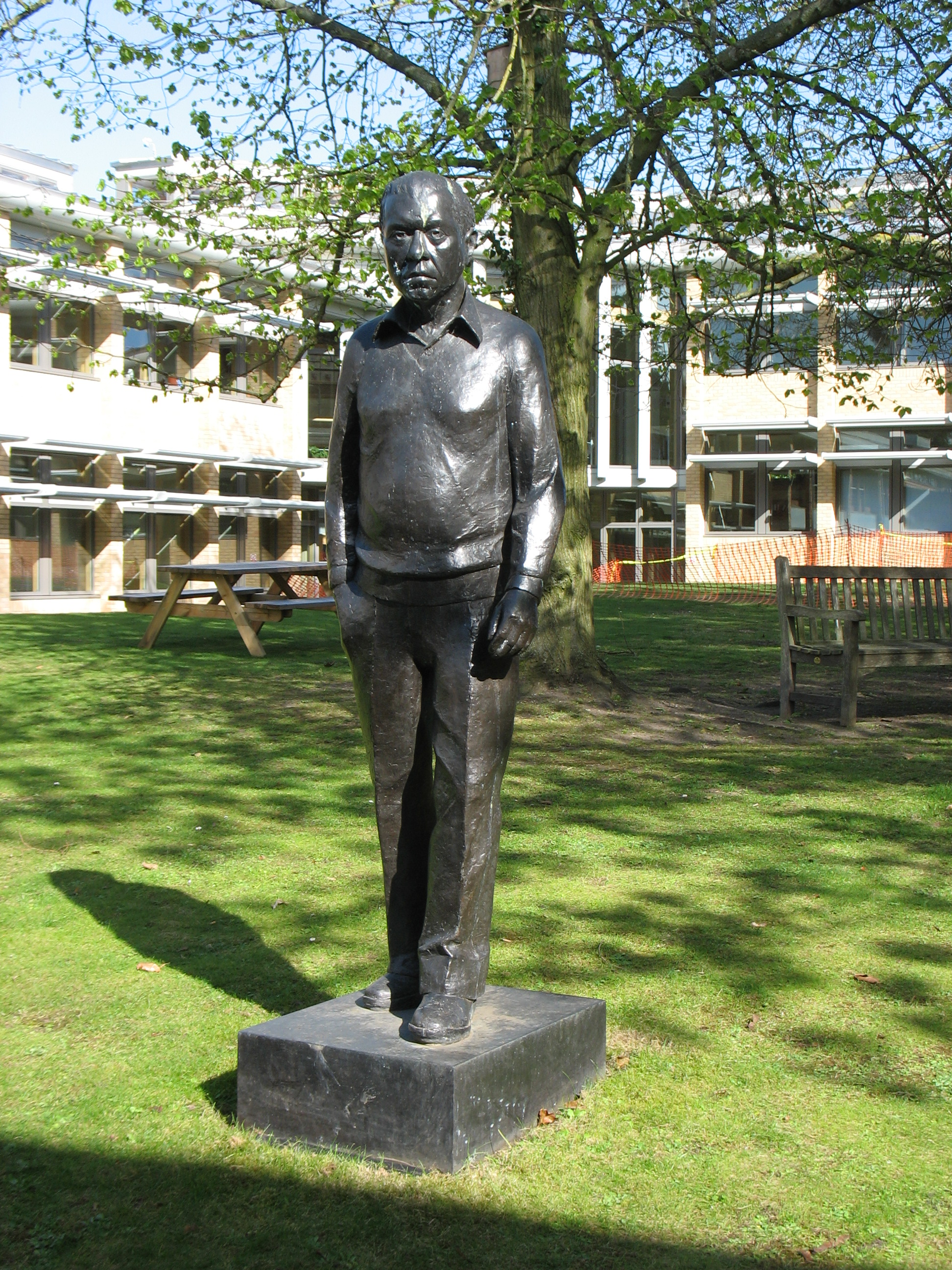
Statue of Hoyle at the Institute of Astronomy, Cambridge

Awards

- Elected a member of the American Academy of Arts and Sciences (1964)
- Elected a Fellow of the Royal Society (FRS) in 1957
- Gold Medal of the Royal Astronomical Society (1968)
- Bakerian Lecture (1968)
- Elected member of the United States National Academy of Sciences (1969)
- Bruce Medal (1970)
- Henry Norris Russell Lectureship (1971)
- Jansky Lectureship before the National Radio Astronomy Observatory
- Knighthood (1972)
- President of the Royal Astronomical Society (1971–1973)
- Honorary Fellow of St John's College, Cambridge (1973–2001)
- Royal Medal (1974)
- Klumpke-Roberts Award of the Astronomical Society of the Pacific (1977)
- Elected member of the American Philosophical Society (1980)
- Balzan Prize for Astrophysics: evolution of stars (1994, with Martin Schwarzschild)
- Crafoord Prize from the Royal Swedish Academy of Sciences, with Edwin Salpeter (1997)

Named after him

- Hoyle Building, Institute of Astronomy, Cambridge
- Asteroid 8077 Hoyle
- Janibacter hoylei, species of bacteria discovered by ISRO scientists
- Sir Fred Hoyle Way, a stretch of the A650 dual carriageway in Bingley.
- Institute of Physics Fred Hoyle Medal and Prize

=== Memorabilia ===
The Fred Hoyle Collection at St John's College Library contains "a pair of walking boots, five boxes of photographs, two ice axes, some dental X-rays, a telescope, ten large film reels and an unpublished opera" in addition to 150 document boxes of papers.

== Bibliography ==
=== Non-fiction ===
- The Nature of the Universe – a series of broadcast lectures, Basil Blackwell, Oxford 1950 (early use of the Big Bang phrase)
- Frontiers of Astronomy, Heinemann Education Books Ltd, London, 1955. The Internet Archive. HarperCollins, ISBN 978-0060027605
- Burbidge, E. M., Burbidge, G. R., Fowler, W. A. and Hoyle, F., "Synthesis of the Elements in Stars", Revs. Mod. Physics 29:547–650, 1957, the famous B^{2}FH paper after their initials, for which Hoyle is most famous among professional cosmologists.
- Astronomy, A history of man's investigation of the universe, Crescent Books, Inc., London 1962, LCCN 62-14108
- Of Men and Galaxies, the University of Washington Press, Seattle, 1964, ASIN B0087VKR70
- Galaxies, Nuclei, and Quasars, Harper & Row, Publishers, New York, 1965, LCCN 65-20996
- Encounter with the Future, Trident Press, New York, 1965, LCCN 65-26309
- Nicolaus Copernicus, Heinemann Educational Books Ltd., London, p. 78, 1973
- Astronomy and Cosmology: A Modern Course, 1975, ISBN 0716703513
- Energy or Extinction? The case for nuclear energy, 1977, Heinemann Educational Books Limited, ISBN 0435544306. In this provocative book Hoyle establishes the dependence of Western civilisation on energy consumption and predicts that nuclear fission as a source of energy is essential for its survival.
- Ten Faces of the Universe, 1977, W.H. Freeman and Company (San Francisco), ISBN 071670384X, 0716703831
- On Stonehenge, 1977, London : Heinemann Educational, ISBN 978-0435329587; San Francisco: W.H. Freeman and Company, ISBN 0716703645, 0716703637 pbk.
- Lifecloud – The Origin of Life in the Universe, Hoyle, F. and Wickramasinghe C., J.M. Dent & Sons, 1978. ISBN 0460043358
- Diseases from Space (with Chandra Wickramasinghe) (J.M. Dent, London, 1979)
- Commonsense in Nuclear Energy, Fred Hoyle and Geoffrey Hoyle, 1980, Heinemann Educational Books Ltd., ISBN 0435544322
- The big bang in astronomy, New Scientist 92(1280):527, 19 November 1981.
- Ice: The Ultimate Human Catastrophe, Continuum, New York, 1981, ISBN 0826400647
- The Intelligent Universe, 1983
- From Grains to Bacteria, Hoyle, F. and Wickramasinghe N. C., University College Cardiff Press, 1984 ISBN 0906449642
- Evolution from space (the Omni lecture) and other papers on the origin of life 1982, ISBN 0894900838
- Evolution from Space: A Theory of Cosmic Creationism, 1984, ISBN 0671492632
- Viruses from Space, 1986, ISBN 0906449936
- With Jayant Narlikar and Chandra Wickramasinghe, The extragalactic universe: an alternative view, Nature 346:807–812, 30 August 1990.
- The Origin of the Universe and the Origin of Religion,1993, ISBN 1559210834
- Home Is Where the Wind Blows: Chapters from a Cosmologist's Life (autobiography) Oxford University Press 1994, ISBN 0198500602
- Mathematics of Evolution, (1987) University College Cardiff Press, (1999) Acorn Enterprises LLC., ISBN 0966993403
- With G. Burbridge and Narlikar J. V. A Different Approach to Cosmology, Cambridge University Press 2000, ISBN 0521662230

=== Science fiction ===
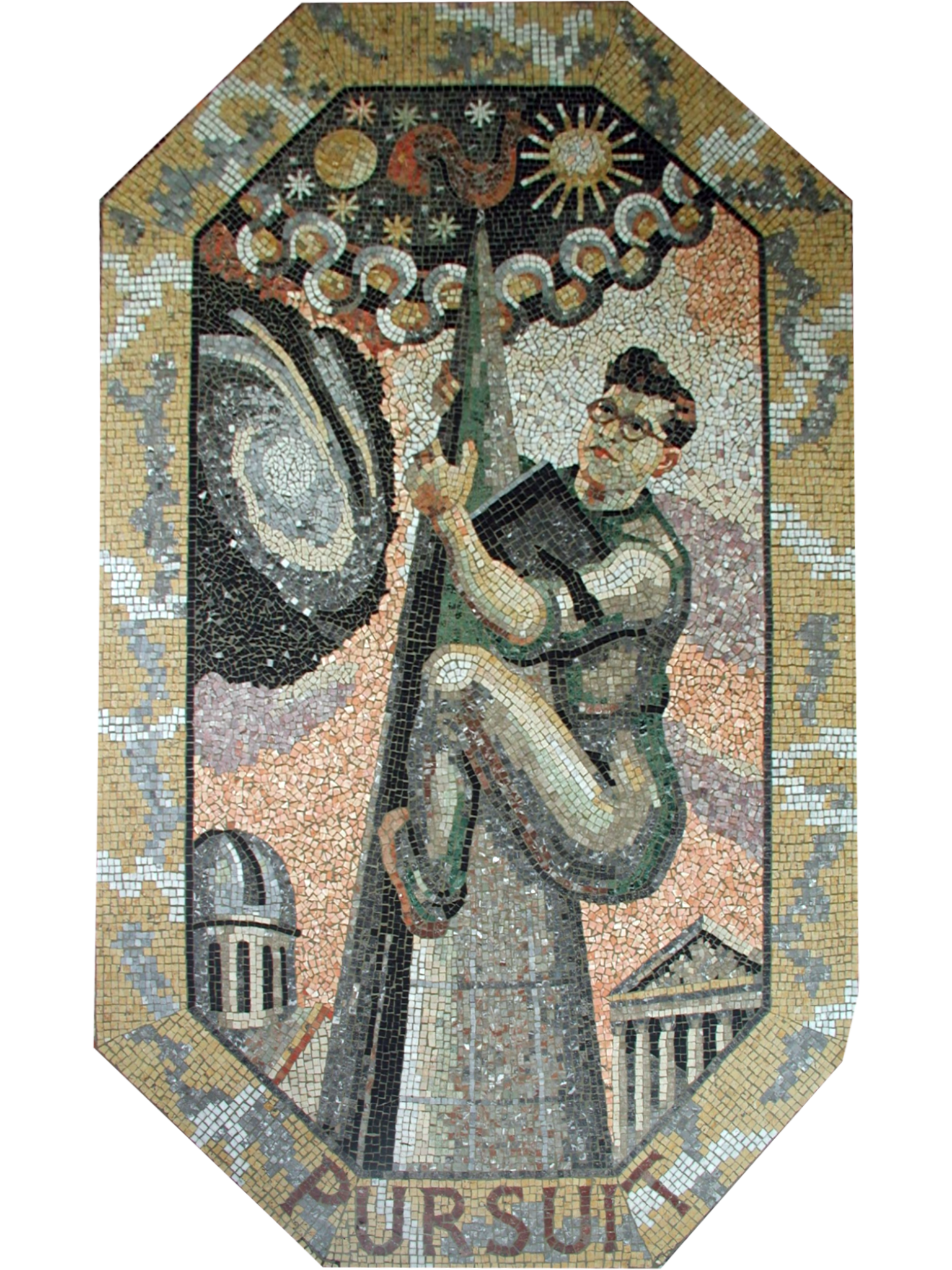
Mosaic by Boris Anrep, in the National Gallery, London, depicting Hoyle as a steeplejack climbing to the stars, a book under his arm

Hoyle also wrote science fiction. In his first novel, The Black Cloud, most intelligent life in the universe takes the form of interstellar gas clouds; they are surprised to learn that intelligent life can also form on planets. He wrote a television series, A for Andromeda, which was also published as a novel. His play Rockets in Ursa Major had a professional production at the Mermaid Theatre in 1962.

- The Black Cloud, 1957
- Ossian's Ride, 1959
- A for Andromeda, 1962 (co-authored with John Elliot)
- Fifth Planet, 1963 (co-authored with Geoffrey Hoyle)
- Andromeda Breakthrough, 1965 (co-authored with John Elliot)
- October the First Is Too Late, 1966
- Element 79 (collection of short stories), 1967
- Rockets in Ursa Major, 1969 (co-authored with Geoffrey Hoyle)
- Seven Steps to the Sun, 1970 (co-authored with Geoffrey Hoyle)
- The Inferno, 1973 (co-authored with Geoffrey Hoyle)
- The Molecule Men and the Monster of Loch Ness, 1973 (co-authored with Geoffrey Hoyle)
- Into Deepest Space, 1974 (co-authored with Geoffrey Hoyle)
- The Incandescent Ones, 1977 (co-authored with Geoffrey Hoyle)
- The Westminster Disaster, 1978 (co-authored with Geoffrey Hoyle and Edited by Barbara Hoyle)
- The Frozen Planet of Azuron, 1982 (Ladybird Books, co-authored with Geoffrey Hoyle)
- The Energy Pirate, 1982 (Ladybird Books, co-authored with Geoffrey Hoyle)
- The Planet of Death, 1982 (Ladybird Books, co-authored with Geoffrey Hoyle)
- The Giants of Universal Park, 1982 (Ladybird Books, co-authored with Geoffrey Hoyle)
- Comet Halley, 1985

Most of these are independent of each other. Andromeda Breakthrough is a sequel to A for Andromeda and Into Deepest Space is a sequel to Rockets in Ursa Major. The four Ladybird Books are intended for children.

Some stories of the collection Element 79 are fantasy, in particular "Welcome to Slippage City" and "The Judgement of Aphrodite". Both introduce mythological characters.

The Telegraph (UK) called him a "masterful" science fiction writer.
