= The Black Cloud =

1957 novel by Fred Hoyle

- Cover of the first edition
- Author: Fred Hoyle
- Cover artist: Desmond Skirrow
- Language: English
- Published: 1957 William Heinemann Ltd
- Media type: Print (book)
- ISBN: 0-451-11432-9

The Black Cloud is a 1957 science fiction novel by British astrophysicist Fred Hoyle. It details the arrival of an enormous cloud of gas that enters the Solar System and appears about to destroy most of the life on Earth by blocking the Sun's radiation.

== Plot summary ==
In 1964, astrophysicists on Earth became aware of a cloud of gas and dust, initially thought to be a Bok globule, that is heading for the Solar System. The cloud, if interposed between the Sun and the Earth, could wipe out most of the life on Earth by blocking solar radiation, thus the name "The Black Cloud". A cadre of astronomers and other scientists is drawn together in Nortonstowe, England, to study the cloud and report to the British government about the consequences of its presence.

The cloud unexpectedly decelerates as it approaches and comes to rest around the Sun, causing disastrous climatic changes on Earth and immense mortality and suffering for the human race. As the behaviour of the cloud proves to be impossible to predict scientifically, the team at Nortonstowe eventually come to the conclusion that it might be a life-form with a degree of intelligence. The scientists try to communicate with the cloud, and succeed. The cloud is revealed to be an alien gaseous superorganism, many times more intelligent than humans, which is surprised to find intelligent life-forms on a solid planet. It reconfigures itself to allow sunlight to return to the Earth and humanity is saved.

Although its ill-effects on humanity have ceased, several governments are mistrustful of the cloud and prepare a nuclear attack upon it. When the scientists alert the cloud of this plot – risking imprisonment for treason and passing on military secrets – it turns the missiles back upon their senders, killing thousands of people, but does not otherwise retaliate. When the astronomers ask the cloud how its lifeform originated, it replies that they have always existed. One of the characters suggests this is incompatible with the Big Bang theory.

The cloud announces that another nearby (by the cloud's standards) intelligent cloud has suddenly stopped communicating and may have vanished. This has apparently happened many times before, often in conjunction with attempts to understand if there is a super-intelligence even more powerful than the clouds, and is a long-standing mystery to the clouds; the cloud therefore decides to leave the Solar System to investigate. During their last few days of communication two of the scientists try to learn some of the cloud's vast store of knowledge through visual signals, in order to gain further insights about the Universe. Both of them die in the attempt, their brains being overloaded.

However, a comrade of theirs gives a roll of punched paper-tape to a young man about 50 years later, saying it contains the code to contact the cloud. The young man wonders what to do with the information, and whether humanity should be a "big fish in a small pond", cut off from the cloud, or a "small fish in a big pond", in communication with a higher intelligence in the galaxy.

== Reception ==
The Spectator described it as "delightful and fascinating", despite the "slightly chilling" implication of the scientists' attitude to the victims. Galaxy reviewer Floyd C. Gale stated that he had not expected "such a noted cosmological theorist" as Hoyle to be a fiction writer but praised the novel "for the high quality of the narrative". Gale stated that "[w]ith the utmost of apparent ease, Hoyle writes a brand of humor that eludes the pens of pros", and hoped that he would "write more superior fictional ventures like this". Damon Knight described Hoyle's plotting as "masterly", saying the novel was "more elaborately convincing and a lot livelier than the usual gloom-laden treatment" in similar stories. Richard Dawkins (writing in the 2010 Penguin Classics reissue) claimed the novel was "one of the greatest science fiction novels ever written".

== Scientific background ==
Although the presence of a sentient cloud of gas may seem unlikely, the story is grounded in hard science. The detection of the cloud is described using physics equations, all of which are included in the book. Hoyle brought his experience and knowledge as the Director of the Institute of Astronomy, Cambridge, a Fellow of the Royal Society, into the book.

In a plot twist that foreshadows Hoyle's stance on panspermia, the cloud expresses surprise that intelligent life is capable of forming on planets.

Speculative discussions among the fictional scientists about the nature of an encountered extraterrestrial life form (the black cloud), and the reasoning applied to decide that this new entity can be regarded as a form of life, is a major theme of the novel. These scientific discussions relative to a broadly inclusive definition of life, including extraterrestrial life, likely reflected possibilities considered plausible by Fred Hoyle.

The novel has a recurrent theme of the duplicity and shallowness of politicians compared with scientists.

== Adaptations ==
The book was adapted as a radio drama by the BBC, broadcast on Saturday 14 December 1957, at 21:15 on the BBC Home Service. The drama was written by Stephen Grenfell.
