= October the First Is Too Late =

1966 novel by Fred Hoyle

October the First is Too Late
- First edition
- Author: Fred Hoyle
- Language: English
- Genre: Science fiction
- Publisher: William Heinemann
- Publication date: 1966
- Publication place: United Kingdom
- Media type: Print (Hardcover)
- Pages: 200
- OCLC: 12712329

October the First is Too Late is a science fiction novel by astrophysicist Fred Hoyle. It was first published in 1966.

The novel describes an extraordinary temporary phase through which the world passes, eventually presenting a civilization of the distant future and history leading to that future. The events are made plausible as one of the main characters, a physicist, thinks aloud as he tries to interpret, according to his scientific awareness, the events that unfold.

== Plot summary ==
The story is set in 1966. The main characters are the narrator (Dick), who is a composer, and John Sinclair, a physicist; they were at school and at Cambridge University together.

They happen to meet at London airport as Dick returns home after conducting a premiere of a composition of his in Cologne, which got a mixed reception. John suggests going on a mountaineering expedition in the Scottish Highlands, as they had once planned. Odd events happen during their excursion: John disappears for several hours and does not remember what happened during his disappearance: Dick takes a nap and more time passes than he expects; bathing in a mountain lake, Dick notices that a birthmark John used to have has disappeared.

The holiday is abandoned after John makes a phone call; there is a development concerning research he is involved with. Detectors in space are detecting unexpected radiation; John has to travel to America and wants Dick to come with him. In California John meets other scientists in the project; it seems the space probe is detecting modulated radiation, i.e. signals, coming from the Sun. At a party, Dick begins an affair with Lena whom he meets there; it is part of a world which will soon be lost to him.

John and Dick go to Hawaii, where there is the radiotelescope which receives the data from the space probe. There are more discussions with scientists in the project; they have found that the Sun is beaming an enormous amount of information into space and they wonder what that information is. John, later talking about this with Dick, is interrupted by news that Los Angeles has been destroyed; this is assumed to be so because radio signals from there have ceased. John and Dick join passengers in an aeroplane which is to travel over the USA; they see no sign of civilization - they guess it is about 1750 there - and, finding nowhere to land, travel on to Europe. They land in England; it is the present day there (although a month later than expected) but in France it is 1917, and the British government is trying to stop World War I. John thinks that the Sun was sending information in order to make copies of parts of the world; the odd events during their holiday were when he and Dick were replaced by copies.

John and Dick join an aeroplane excursion: in Russia, they find only a flat glass surface; Greece is in classical times. They later realize that the glass surface they found was the world long after all life was extinct.

Dick, without John, joins an expedition by sea to Ancient Greece. They get to know a Greek family and, having brought a piano, Dick plays to them. Composing music in a temple, he meets a priestess who suggests a musical competition. He agrees; the priestess's music has a strange quality. After the decision that it is a draw, Dick and the priestess spend the night together.

He later wakes alone in a futuristic room; John is there and explains that they are in a part of the world (Mexico) which is in the distant future; the priestess, Melea, is part of this civilization. Melea has a machine for Dick which sounds like a piano (which he plays) and a large metal disc which, when placed in a device, plays a realization of the music he composed in the temple.

Dick and John are shown a documentary film, covering the thousands of years since 1966, during which there were several crises where humanity became almost extinct, followed by a re-emerging civilization. The USA which they thought was in 1750 was actually in a period of collapse after one of the crises. The present civilization, aware of this history, no longer wants progress.

Dick and John have to decide soon whether to go back to the England of 1966 or stay in this non-progressing world; they are aware that the present phase, in which parts of the world are in various times, will end, and to stay will mean living permanently in this future world. Dick decides to stay, and John returns. The story concludes as Dick, two years later, considers his new life as a composer in this new civilization.

== The pigeon-hole theory ==
After meeting some government ministers in the London of 1966 who are considering how to deal with the situation in the France of 1917, which is in the midst of World War I, John Sinclair (in the last few pages of Chapter 7) talks to Dick about his theory that might explain what has happened.

He considers each moment of time as a state represented by a pigeon-hole; the sequence in which they might be accessed might not be in time sequence. "A sequence is a logical concept in which time doesn't really enter at all," he says. "... Our consciousness corresponds to just where the light falls, as it dances about among the pigeon-holes... What is this light? ... My strong hunch is that it's the spot of light that permits decisions which lie outside the laws of physics." He considers that there might be more than one set of pigeon-holes, but only one light. "For every different person, you need a separate set of pigeon-holes. But the consciousness could be the same."

John thinks that their new situation, a world made of parts of the old world, might be due to a new set of pigeon-holes, made of some of the pigeon-holes in the other system.

(This pigeon-hole theory is similar to and predates the one developed by Julian Barbour in his book The End of Time, as Barbour himself acknowledges.)

== See also ==
- Time's Eye (2003 novel) depicting a similar Earth with segments from different times
- Permutation City
- Mathematical universe hypothesis
