= No Equal Entertainment =

Canadian production company

- Industry: Live-action
- Genre: Production
- Founded: 1998; 28 years ago
- Founder: J.B. Sugar
- Headquarters: Toronto, Ontario, Canada

No Equal Entertainment is a Canadian television and film production company owned and operated by Emmy Award Nominated and Student Academy Award winning producer/director J.B. Sugar based in Toronto, Ontario, Canada. No Equal develops and produces both scripted and documentary projects. In addition to producing their original projects, No Equal provides production services for studios, networks and broadcasters around the world. To date, No Equal has produced over 300 episodes of television.

== History ==
Founded in 1998 by Larry Sugar, No Equal Entertainment was originally based in Vancouver, Canada and got its start providing production services for projects such as Dead Man's Gun, Nightwatching, and First Wave. No Equal added original television productions to their slate with The Collector, JPod, and Bitten.

J.B. Sugar took over as President of No Equal prior to the company producing Bitten based on the Women of the Otherworld book series by Kelley Armstrong. Starring Laura Vandervoort, the series marked No Equal's shift to Toronto where the show was filmed.

== Television series ==
=== Bitten (2014-2016) ===
Produced for Space (now CTV Sci-Fi) and Syfy, Bitten is an adaptation of the Women of the Otherworld book series by Kelley Armstrong. The series stars Laura Vandervoort as Elena Michaels, Greg Bryk, Greyston Holt, Steve Lund, and Michael Xavier. The series ran for three seasons with the last episode airing in 2016.

=== jPod (2008) ===
Based on Douglas Coupland's novel of the same name, jPod is a comedy series produced for CBC Television. Douglas Coupland co-created the show with Michael MacLennan. JPod ran for one season before being cancelled.

=== The Collector (2004-2006) ===
Created by Jon Cooksey and Ali Marie Matheson, The Collector is a supernatural drama that originally aired on CHUM Television (now Citytv) and ran for three seasons. The show premiered in 2004 and starred Chris Kramer.

== Movies ==
=== Don't Hang Up (2022) ===
Don't Hang Up is an action thriller that aired on Bounce TV and premiered on March 20, 2022. Starring Wendell Pierce (The Wire), Lauren Holly (NCIS), and Eden Cupid (The Umbrella Academy). The film follows Chris Daniels (Wendell Pierce) who faces an uphill task to save his family. With just one phone call, his whole world turns upside down. Not only is his daughter, Sarah (Eden Cupid), taken as a hostage, but in order to get her back, he must complete a series of tasks. It was directed and produced by J.B. Sugar and written by Byl Caruthers.

=== Faith Heist (2021) ===
Faith Heist is an ensemble comedy that originally aired on Bounce TV. The film premiered on April 4, 2021. Starring Jonathan Langdon and directed by J.B. Sugar, the film is about a preacher and his congregation concocting a plan to steal back the church's money that was embezzled by a financial advisor.

=== The Guardians (2018) ===
The Guardians is an investigative documentary that premiered at the Hot Docs Canadian International Documentary Festival about the abuse of the court-appointed guardian system in Las Vegas, Nevada. A number of cases of abusive guardianship are covered in the film and it features the stories of victims of professional guardian April Parks who was convicted of elder abuse and sentenced to up to 40 years in prison. The film was commissioned by Documentary Channel and was highlighted in an episode of Last Week Tonight with John Oliver in his segment on guardianship.

== Development ==
Throughout the years there have been announcements about projects in development at No Equal. Some notable projects are:

=== The Powder Mage trilogy ===
In January 2021, No Equal announced that they are developing an adaptation of Brian McClellan's Powder Mage novels with Frantic Films. The adaptation is being done by writer Joseph Mallozzi who previously worked on the Stargate shows.

=== Mezcalero ===
Together with OutTV, No Equal announced an adaptation of the Detective Sanchez novel series. Written by T.E. Wilson, the books follows Ernesto Sanchez a transgender detective hired to solve the case of a missing woman.

=== Moon Knight ===
In the fall of 2006, No Equal announced an agreement with Marvel Entertainment to develop a live-action television series based on the character Moon Knight. Since the announcement, there have been no further details on the status of the series with No Equal and in 2020 Disney+ announced they were internally developing a Moon Knight series.

=== WWW Trilogy ===
An adaptation of Robert J. Sawyer's WWW Trilogy was announced in 2019. The science fiction series follows a blind teenage girl who gains sight thanks to a signal-processing implant. The trilogy consists of Wake, Watch and Wonder and is set to be adapted by Shelley Scarrow who has recently written on Wynonna Earp and V Wars.
