= Quintaglio Ascension Trilogy =

Science Fiction Novel Series

The Quintaglio Ascension Trilogy is a series of novels written by Canadian science fiction author Robert J. Sawyer. The books depict an Earth-like world on a moon which orbits a gas giant, inhabited by a species of highly evolved, sentient Tyrannosaurs, among various other creatures from the late Cretaceous period, imported to this moon by aliens 65 million years prior to the story. The series consists of three books: Far-Seer, Fossil Hunter, and Foreigner.

== The trilogy ==
Cover	Title	Year	ISBN
	Far-Seer	1992	ISBN 0-441-22551-9
Far-Seer is the first book in the Quintaglio Ascension. Sixty-five million years ago, aliens transplanted Earth's dinosaurs to another world. Now, intelligent saurians -- the Quintaglio -- have emerged. Afsan, the Quintaglio counterpart of Galileo, must convince his people of the truth about their place in the universe before astronomical forces rip the dinosaurs' new home apart.
	Fossil Hunter	1993	ISBN 978-0-441-24884-1
Fossil Hunter is the second book in the series. Toroca, a Quintaglio geologist (and son of Afsan, from the previous book), is under attack for his controversial theory of evolution. But the origins of his people turn out to be more complex than he ever imagined, for he soon discovers the wreckage of an ancient starship -- a relic of the aliens who transplanted Earth's dinosaurs to this planetary system. Now Toroca must convince Emperor Dybo that evolution is true; otherwise, the territorial violence inherited from their Tyrannosaur ancestors will destroy the last survivors of Earth's prehistoric past. Meanwhile, Emperor Dybo's rule is challenged by his brother Dy-Rodlox, lord of Edz-Toolar.
	Foreigner	1994	ISBN 978-0-441-00017-3
Foreigner is the final book in the series. In Far-Seer and Fossil Hunter, readers met the Quintaglios, a race of intelligent dinosaurs and learned the threat to their existence. Now they must quickly advance from a culture equivalent to Earth's Renaissance to the point where they can leave their world. While the Quintaglios rush to develop space travel, the discovery of a second species of intelligent dinosaurs rocks their most fundamental beliefs. Meanwhile, blind Afsan -- the Quintaglio Galileo -- undergoes the newfangled treatment of psychoanalysis, throwing everything he thought he knew about his people into a startling new light.

== The Quintaglios ==
The Quintaglio are a fictional species of sapient theropods which first appeared in Robert J. Sawyer's short story "Uphill Climb", and later on starred in his Quintaglio Ascension Trilogy. Descended from earth's dinosaurs, (specifically, Tyrannosaurs), they live on a moon orbiting a gas giant that they refer to as "The Face of God".

=== Evolution ===
As stated above, Quintaglios are Tyrannosaurs. It is stated in Fossil Hunter that they're directly descended from Nanotyrannus. Isolation on the Quintaglio Moon (along with some genetic modifications to their Tyrannosaur ancestors by the aliens that transplanted them there to push them in the right direction), ensured that one day they would evolve into a sentient species. 65 million years later, they did, and the Quintaglio race emerged.

=== Physiology and comparison to Tyrannosaurs ===
Quintaglios resemble miniature Tyrannosaurs, and share many features in common with their ancestors. They eat only meat, and have massive heads with jaws filled with rows of sharp, serrated teeth. They have short, muscular necks, stocky torsos, solid black forward-facing eyes, thick muscular tails, and powerful hind legs ending with three birdlike talons.

However, due to the 65 million years they have had to evolve, Quintaglios vary from tyrannosaurs in several significant ways. Tyrannosaurs have very stubby forelimbs, with only two visible fingers. Quintaglios, on the other hand, have longer, more well developed arms with dexterous five-fingered hands, (four fingers and an opposable digit) similar to a human, (unlike humans, though, most Quintaglios are left-handed). The fingers terminate in curved, retractable claws, which can be extended at will (such as when threatened). They are much smaller than a Tyrannosaur, although still large; an old adult Quintaglio standing about 8 feet (2.4 m) high. Rather than standing with their backs parallel to the ground like a normal theropod, they usually maintain a semi-erect posture, although while running they do stoop forward into a traditional theropod-like stance. They are far more intelligent than their ancestors.

While they are indeed dinosaurs, Quintaglios possess a variety of traits that are more reminiscent of lizards. They are capable of limited regeneration; a Quintaglio can grow back a severed limb or tail, although complex, vital structures such as organs cannot be grown back. Male Quintaglios possess a dewlap sack on their throats, similar to a frog's or those on some types of birds, which they can inflate with air when they are sexually aroused or in "dagamant" (likely "battle frenzy" though no literal translation is given, dagamant is brought on by extreme territorial encroachment and occasionally other factors). Quintaglios continue to grow throughout their entire lives, like crocodiles, although their growth rate slows with age. Similar to certain lizards, Quintaglios have a small salt-secretion gland beneath the surface of the muzzle, but the opening for it is simply a very tiny hole halfway down the side of the muzzle. Except in an extreme close-up view, it would be all but invisible.

Quintaglio hide is tough and leathery. As humans have lost most body hair, Quintaglios have lost most scales and scutes, but these may be present in individuals. Quintaglio skin is almost entirely green, although it may be freckled, mottled, or splotched with brown or yellow in some individuals, and with black in old individuals. Oddly enough, Quintaglios cannot lie; their muzzles turn blue when they say something untrue, and for this reason the colour blue is reviled among Quintaglios as "The Liars' Tint". Those who can lie without their muzzles turning blue are called demons or "Aug-Ta-Rot", which literally means "Those who can lie in the light of day", and though there exist Quintaglios capable of doing so, this is not widely known, and Aug-Ta-Rot are believed to exist only in mythology.

=== Lifestyle ===
Quintaglios are exclusively carnivorous, like their Tyrannosaur ancestors. They bring down larger prey by hunting in packs. While they are advanced enough to use weapons to kill prey, their culture forbids it; Quintaglios hunt the old-fashioned way, running prey down and dispatching it via tooth and claw. Quintaglio hunts are led by special female Quintaglios who perpetually emit the pheromones characteristic of being in heat, though they are typically also sterile.

Quintaglios live a mostly nomadic lifestyle, travelling in packs and following herds of animals. They set up camp for a short while, then move on so that prey can repopulate extensively hunted areas. Quintaglio population density is kept fairly low for this reason, and also due to the culling of egglings by the Bloodpriests. The culling of eggs is necessary as Quintaglios have a large sense of territoriality, socially acceptable close quarters means anywhere from 7 to 10 paces between each person. Quntaglios who feel that their space has been violated, along with other factors (such as having not hunted in a long time) tend to get fierce, and if not calmed might enter dagamant and fight the intruder(s) to the death.

Quintaglios are sparsely clad, and wear little clothing beyond simple sashes, hats, belts and jewellery. Priests, however, wear robes; junior priests wear robes of black and red, senior priests wear colourful, banded robes coloured like The Face of God (these are changed to white robes after Far-Seer), and Bloodpriests wear purple robes.

=== Religion and tradition ===
Quintaglios are a very religious people. Their original creation myth tells of a goddess who laid the "Eight Eggs of Creation". From the first egg came all the water, and from the second came the land. From the third came all the air, and from the fourth came the sun. From the fifth came the stars, planets and moons, and from the sixth came all the plants. Finally, from the seventh came all the herbivores (Ceratopsians, Ankylosaurs, Sauropods and Hadrosaurs, among others), and from the eighth and final egg came the carnivores which preyed upon them, (Tyrannosaurs, Ornithomimids and Dromaeosaurids, among others.) God created the five original female hunters by biting off her left arm, each of her fingers becoming a Quintaglio. They wished to create as God did, so she bit off her right arm and these became the first males, the mates of the original hunters.

Quintaglio tradition states that a Quintaglio must go on at least one proper hunt in their life in order to go through the rites of passage. After a successful hunt, the Quintaglio gets a hunting tattoo which symbolises their passage into adulthood. Adults with no hunting tattoo are accorded no status at all.

The Quintaglio mythos was further expanded when roughly 150 years prior to the story, the Quintaglio prophet "Larsk" discovered what he believed to be the face of God, and a religion was built around the worship of The Face of God. Larsk's descendants became the Royal Family, and rule all of land. Dy-Dybo, former Prince and current Emperor, is a part of the Royal Family and a direct descendant of Larsk. This religion adds a new tradition to Quintaglio society; that of sailing across the ocean to retrace Larsk's voyage and gaze upon The Face of God. The story of the first book in the series revolves around Afsan (the main character), discrediting this notion while on one of these voyages, and challenging Quintaglio tradition by proving that the Face of God was nothing more than a planet.

There also exists a cult known as the Lubalites. This cult is based around the worship of the original five hunters, particularly Lubal, and rejects the notion that The Face of God is actually God, adhering more closely to the original creation myths set forth in the sacred scrolls. Worship of the original five was banned by Larsk, but after Far-Seer the Larskian faith is discredited and the Lubalites are free to engage in worship of the original five without persecution.

A special order in the Quintaglio Priesthood are known as the "Halpataars", or "Bloodpriests". In order to prevent overpopulation, a Bloodpriest is assigned to devour seven out of every eight Quintaglio hatchlings a day after they hatch. The Bloodpriest first goes into a trance, then dons a purple robe and enters the nest; there, he chases the hatchlings and eats all but the fastest, strongest one. The order of the Bloodpriests is exclusively male; the original Bloodpriest was Mekt, one of the original five hunters, but she passed on the tradition to males because she felt it was inappropriate for one who lays eggs to dispatch hatchlings.

=== Territoriality and dagamant ===
While Quintaglios consider themselves to be civilised beings, deep down their thoughts and actions are ruled by their primal, territorial instincts. Quintaglios hate physical contact with one another, value their privacy and have a wide circumference of personal space. Spending too much time in the company of others, or extended time in close quarters with other Quintaglios can cause them to enter an animalistic frenzy known as dagamant. This also happens if exposed to sufficiently alien stimuli; it is implied that this is triggered by the uncanny valley effect after some Quantaglio are driven to immediate dagamant by the merest sight of the Yellow Quintaglios.

When a Quintaglio is in dagamant, he or she will bob their torsos up and down, and males will inflate their dewlap sacks. A Quintaglio under dagamant loses all conscious control over their actions, and will attack with unrelenting viciousness and bloodlust until it wears off or one or both are killed; for this reason, to kill another while in dagamant is not considered murder by Quintaglios.

Seeing a Quintaglio in dagamant can trigger it in others- in overpopulated areas, or on crowded ships, "Mass Dagamant" has been known to occur. The books frequently refer to a past event of a Mass Dagamant aboard the ship Galadoreter, in which the entire crew went into a territorial frenzy and everybody on board was killed.

Some Quintaglios are exempt from dagamant; Toroca, Afsan's son, has a subdued territorial instinct, and it is implied that Dybo is less susceptible to it as well, although not entirely. However, this is extremely rare, and nearly all other Quintaglios have the territorial instinct.

Even Afsan himself, among the most level-headed and rational of Quintaglios, had killed while under the madness of dagamant, not once, but twice; the first time was in Far-Seer, aboard the Dasheter, where he and Dybo were challenged by a sailor named Nor-Gampar in full dagamant; Afsan killed Gampar and nearly attacked Dybo before coming to his senses. The second time was during the mass dagamant caused by the bloodpriest repute in Fossil Hunter, and he killed Rodlox's aide Pod-Oro.

It is later discovered that dagamant is an almost entirely psychological condition. Due to the horrifying experience of the Bloodpriest ritual, experienced within a day of birth, the Quintaglio brain imprints with an extreme fear of anything outside itself. Anyone who has not been through the ritual suffers from little if any tendency to enter dagamant, and is capable of interacting with and living with people in close quarters with little ill effect.

=== Technology ===
Quintaglios have a level of technology comparable to Earth's Renaissance. They have sailing ships, and have not discovered electricity, fossil fuels, or solar power. The telescope and the microscope are recent inventions and medicine is in its infancy. Aviation is also in its infancy, and has not advanced beyond gliders. Following the work of Afsan and Toroca, Quintaglios are aware of the solar system and evolution. Buildings are made out of stone or mud; due to frequent earthquakes, structures rarely stand for very long. Quintaglios have no firearms, and their laws and customs pertaining to using weapons to kill food make it unlikely that they will develop them.

In the epilogue at the end of Foreigner, the Quintaglio's technological prowess has increased dramatically due to new technology recovered from the ancient alien spaceship. The Quintaglios have apparently achieved spaceflight, built computers and set up temporary colonies on nearby moons. They are on their way to colonising new worlds, and it is implied that they are on their way to Earth.

=== Reproduction and family structures ===
The estrous cycle of female Quintaglios is 18 thousand days, and a female will hopefully mate 4 times in her lifetime every cycle, normally. There are some exceptions though, as Natova, and one of her daughter with Afsan, arose when 16 thousand days old. Also some females will often at the estrous cycle, thus having very low fertility. While male can mate at almost anytime, they have to wait for a chance, when a female is currently about to enter the cycle and accept the invitation. Females do not have to stick with one male every time, instead, they follow their instinct and choose the right spouse for the moment. Despite living on their own territory, the Quintaglios often have a long lasting friendship with the previous spouses, with the possibility of some forms of pair bonding.

The female will usually give birth after the mating and lay exactly eight eggs. And the egg will be of custody of the public nursery. When all of the eggs hatched, a Bloodpriest will pick one, often the strongest and swiftest, and devour all others. As the child is designed to belong to the tribe, the parents and the child often do not know each other for the lifetime - only by guessing through their ages, as well as some traits. Only the nursery's record would reveal the truth. There are some exceptions - in royal family, and Afsan's family, all children would be let survive and the lineage of the members are quite clear. Later, it was discovered that siblings have anxieties when being together, and may cause serious sibling rivalry accidents.

In Foreigner, it is decided to end the tradition of killing hatchlings and instead just not allowing seven out of the eight eggs to hatch. This decision came from Toroca, after it was proven that the Bloodpriests' tradition was actually psychologically scarring the survivor and causing increased territoriality. It was also decided that the survivor should be chosen randomly among the unhatched eggs, in order to increase the variability of the population. It is also hinted that the Quintaglios begin to develop parent-child relationship universally, in the new era.

== The Others ==
In Foreigner, a second species of sentient theropods is discovered on an archipelago on the other side of the world; they are simply known as "The Others". They are similar to the Quintaglios, but both genders have dewlaps, are yellow with grey highlights, and are smaller in stature. They can lie without physical changes, and have about four eggs each time.

== Character histories ==
The following is a list of the main and secondary characters featured in the books.

=== Main characters ===
- Sal-Afsan: The main character of the series. He was the apprentice astrologer to the court astrologer, Tak Saleed. Afsan is described as being thin for a Quintaglio; ironically, the name Afsan means "Meaty thighbone". Afsan is a mathematical Genius- as a child; he never had any problem solving puzzles set forth by his teaching master. Afsan is open minded, inquisitive, and rational; the necessary qualities for a good scientist.

On his pilgrimage, Afsan discovers that the Face of God is just a planet, and also discovers that their world is a moon that orbits it; furthermore, the Quintaglio moon is too close to the planet, and that it causes stresses that will one day reduce it to a ring of rubble surrounding the planet. When he declares his findings, he is met with opposition from the Master of the Faith, Det Yenalb, and is blinded as punishment for his "heresy".

Afsan's ability to keep a level headed, strategic perspective has also made him an expert hunter. On his first hunt, he killed the biggest Sauropod ever seen, slew the water serpent Kal-Ta-Goot during his pilgrimage, and single-handedly killed a Fangjaw on his trip back to capital city. It is this hunting prowess, as well as his proclamation of the end of the world, that caused the Lubalites (practitioners of the Cult of the Original Five Hunters) to believe that he is "The One" foretold in their ancient prophecy.

Afsan also mated with Wab-Novato, and produced a clutch of eight eggs with her. Their egglings were spared the culling of the bloodpriests because the Lubalites believed Afsan was The One, and so would not eat them. Afsan's son, Toroca, is a prominent character in Fossil Hunter and Foreigner.

In the second book, Afsan is made Dybo's court astrologer, and is given a "Seeing Eye" Goanna named "Gork" by his aide, former palace butcher Pal-Cadool. Though Afsan is now blind, this doesn't stop him from trying to track down a murderer when his children start to get killed off one-by-one. He also proposes a solution for Emperor Dy-Dybo when his Brother, Dy-Rodlox, challenges him for position of Emperor.

In the beginning of the third book, he suffers an accident which nearly kills him, but as a result he regenerates his eyes; however, he is still blind, despite having eyes that are physically fully functional. Afsan undergoes extensive psychoanalysis with Nav-Mokleb to try and solve this problem. Afsan is wounded by a gunshot during a confrontation with "The Others"; the doctors, having no experience with the effects of injuries caused by weapons, leave the bullet inside of him not realizing that it will kill him. He lives long enough for his eyesight to come back, and he says goodbye to his friends and loved ones before his death.

In the epilogue of Foreigner, Afsan is long dead, but a computer emulating his exact thoughts and mannerisms has been built. It journeys with the last of the Quintaglios to return to their original home; Earth.

- Tak-Saleed: Afsan's mentor and the former court astrologer under Empress Len-Lends. He is a gruff, crotchety, ancient Quintaglio, and creche-mate of Var-Keenir. He went through six apprentice astrologers before he took on Afsan. He actually found the truth of celestial bodies before Afsan, and was glad to know Afsan discovered more before his death.
- Dy-Dybo: Former prince, now the Emperor of all of Land, and Afsan's close friend. Despite not being the fastest or the strongest of Lends' egglings - actually the weakest and the easiest one to be manipulated, he nevertheless became the greatest ruler the Quintaglio race has ever seen. He has a good sense of humour, and a legendary appetite. In Fossil Hunter, a political scandal concerning his legitimacy as Emperor is one of the main plot threads.
- Wab-Novato: Inventor of the Far Seer and the first astronaut. She led the important project of great escape, and discovered many valuable ancient remains. She and Afsan mated and laid eight eggs together, one of them died in infancy, and other 3 died for sibling rivalry in adolescence. She also have a daughter later with another male friend, but the daughter was indifferent to her and later died in an accident. After that she chose Afsan again to mate for the third time.
- Pal-Cadool: The palace butcher - also a Lubalite and, later, the loyal assistant and close friend to Afsan.
- Var-Keenir: The captain of the Dasheter and the childhood friend of Tak-Saleed. He starts off as a cold, Captain Ahab-like character, obsessed with hunting the Elasmosaur Kal-Ta-Goot. After this event he mellows and becomes a warmer character and a close friend of Afsan.
- Det-Yenalb: A high priest and the Antagonist of the first book He attempted to have Afsan executed, for he saw him and his ideas as a threat to Quintaglio civilisation. Yenalb dies in battle against Pal-Cadool.
- Kee-Toroca: Afsan and Novato's son, and the protagonist of the second book. He is a geologist, and eventually becomes the Quintaglio version of Charles Darwin when he formulates a theory of natural selection. He is the first one to contact with alien dinosaurs and learn their languages. He has a foster alien son, and a biological son possibly with Babnol, who shared the same name.
- Wab-Babnol: Toroca's love interest, and a member of the Geological Survey team. She was born with a prominent horn on the tip of her snout, a physical feature which causes her great embarrassment.
- Dy-Rodlox: The antagonist of the second book. A brother of Dybo and the lord of Edz'Toolar, he is powerful and aggressive, and is the strongest of Empress Lends' children. He believes he was meant to be the true emperor, not Dybo, and challenges him for his right to rule.
- Nav-Mokelb: An important character in the third book, she is the inventor of psychoanalysis, and her studies eventually reveal the startling truth behind the Quintaglio territorial impulse. She is also noteworthy for being one the minority of females constantly emitting sex pheromones, though she was ineligible to be a huntress, the usual profession of such females, due to a debilitating childhood injury.

== The world of the Quintaglios ==
=== Geography ===
The Quintaglios live on a moon, that orbits around a gas giant called "Galatjaroob", which means "The Face of God". The moon is mostly covered by water, but has a single huge continent on the far side, a small archipelago of islands on the other, and a southern and northern ice cap. The continent the Quintaglios live on is called simply called "Land", and is split up into provinces. There are eight provinces, and they are called, (from west to east)

- Jam'Toolar
- Fra'Toolar
- Arj'Toolar
- Chu'Toolar
- Mar'Toolar
- Edz'Toolar
- Kev'Toolar
- Capital

Capital City lies on the far eastern end of land, in the shadow of the Ch'Mar volcanoes. It is where most of the action takes place. Arj'Toolar is Afsan's home province.

=== Featured dinosaurs and other creatures ===
In addition to Quintaglios, many other creatures inhabit the Quintaglio Moon. All originally came from earth. Some have remained pretty much unchanged since the Cretaceous period, whereas others have evolved since then into completely new species. There are no mammals on the Quintaglio moon, and birds are extinct. Following is a list and a brief description of creatures known to inhabit the Quintaglio moon, first with the Quintaglio term and then the human one.

- Shovelmouth (Hadrosaurs): Large, duckbilled dinosaurs, they are hunted as food by Quintaglios and occasionally used as beasts-of-burden. Despite having stringy meat, they form the staple of the Quintaglio diet. Corythosaurus, Parasaurolophus and Lambeosaurus are seen (although the latter is apparently extinct) as well as completely new varieties of shovelmouth/hadrosaur, including one with a three-pointed crest and a breed from Arj'Toolar that is orange with blue stripes, and reportedly the tastiest kind of all.
- Armourback (Ankylosaurs): A few Armourbacks are seen and mentioned in passing. They are noted as being extremely difficult to kill. The Lubalites and Palace staff use a few Armourbacks as riding mounts during the final battle in Far-Seer, and the Quintaglio version of the Turtles all the way down story substitutes turtles with armourbacks. Mekt, one of the Original Five and the first bloodpriest, apparently killed an Armourback.
- Hornface (Ceratopsians): Hunted as food and occasionally domesticated by Quintaglios. Three species are confirmed to exist. The most commonly seen variety are "Triple Hornface" (Triceratops), but "Spikefrills" (Styracosaurus) and "Boss-Nosed Hornface" (Pachyrhinosaurus) are also depicted. Einiosaurus is also mentioned but like the Lambeosaurus is apparently extinct. A Triple Hornface apparently killed Lubal, one of the Original Five. Det-Yenalb rides a Spikefrill in the final battle in Far-Seer, and Lub-Galpook (Afsan's daughter and hunt leader) brings along a caravan of Boss-Nosed Hornfaces to act as beasts of burden during the capture of a Blackdeath.
- Thunderbeast (Sauropods, possibly Alamosaurus): Thunderbeasts are the biggest herbivores living on the Quintaglio Moon. Afsan's hunting party went after a staggeringly huge one on Afsan's first hunt, and he made a big impression by being the one to actually kill it, by climbing all the way up its neck and biting out its throat.
- Runningbeast (Ornithomimids): The fastest creatures in all of land, they are used by Quintaglios like horses. Two varieties exist; a green type and a beige type. Afsan rides one on his trip back to the capital.
- Fangjaw: Fangjaws are unique to the Quintaglio moon, a fleet footed, quadrupedal, carnivorous dinosaur that evolved from an unspecified theropod species. They have elongated jaws with two big teeth sticking up from the lower jaw, and apparently hunt Thunderbeasts, Shovelmouths and Runningbeasts. Afsan killed one on his last hunt before being blinded, impressing everybody by managing to bring one down on his first try.
- Wingfinger (Pterosaurs): Because birds are extinct on the Quintaglio Moon, pterosaurs were able to rule the skies of the dinosaurs' new home unchallenged, and evolved into a huge variety of new species. The Quintaglio's southern ice-cap is inhabited exclusively by pterosaurs, which have evolved since then into completely new creatures, such as "Divers" (pterosaurs similar to Penguins) and "Stilts", (a bizarre pterosaur derivative which uses its long arms like legs.) It is the pterosaurs of the South Pole that give Toroca his idea of evolution.
- Fish Lizard (Ichthyosaurs): Fish lizards inhabit the seas of the Quintaglio moon. Baby ones are often hauled aboard and eaten on sailing trips, (the dorsal fin and the tail are apparently the best parts). Toroca fights an adult Fish Lizard when swimming back to the Dasheter from the Others' archipelago.
- Kal-Ta-Goot/Water Serpent (Plesiosaurs): A single plesiosaur is seen the first book, Far-Seer. Its name is Kal-Ta-Goot. In a sub-plot remarkably similar to (and probably a reference to) Moby-Dick, Captain Var-Keenir is obsessed with killing it after it bites off his tail in an encounter prior to the story. Afsan is the one who kills the creature in the end. As Kal is the only plesiosaur seen or referenced to in the book, it is unknown whether Kal-Ta-Goot is the name of the species or the individual plesiosaur Keenir was obsessed with killing. If not for Keenir's obsession with Kal, the Dasheter never would have gone out of sight of The Face of God, and Afsan would never have been able to sail across the entire ocean and prove the world was round.
- Terrorclaw (Dromaeosaurs): They are never seen, although an event mentioned in-passing has Novato apparently having a kill of hers stolen by a pack of Terrorclaws and she escapes from them by climbing up a tree.
- Blackdeath (Tyrannosaurus rex): The Apex predator on the Quintaglio Moon, they are named so after their pitch black hide. The males possess a dewlap sack, same as Quintaglios do. Blackdeaths are impossible for a Quintaglio to kill without the aid of weapons, which Quintaglio custom forbids, thus they are completely inaccessible as prey. However, Lub-Galpook's hunting party is able to capture one alive. Emperor Dy-Dybo, Dy-Rodlox and the other apprentice governors are forced to fight the same Blackdeath in an arena at the end of Fossil Hunter, to repay their exemption from the culling of the Bloodpriests, where it manages to kill all of them except for Dybo and Spenress. A Blackdeath also takes the place of the Giant in "Rewdan and the Vine", the Quintaglio version of Jack and the Beanstalk.
- Lizards (A monitor lizard named "Gork" becomes Afsan's pet and "Seeing Eye" lizard after he is blinded by Yenalb.)
- Frogs
- Salamanders
- Snakes
- Turtles
- Alligators
- Fish
- Sharks
- Insects
- The Others. A race of sentient dinosaurs discovered in Foreigner, similar to the Quintaglios, though of a different species.
- Jijaki. The Jijaki are an advanced alien species descended from Opabinia, transplanted to another world. The Jijaki spread life throughout the universe, seeding many species, including the Quintaglios themselves. The Jijaki became extinct millions of years prior to the story.

== Themes and allegory ==
The Quintaglio Ascension Trilogy is intended to be an allegory to the human races' Age of Enlightenment. Each book features a Quintaglio equivalent to a prominent human thinker. Sal-Afsan is a Quintaglio version of Galileo, his son Toroca is the Quintaglio equivalent to Charles Darwin, and Mokleb is a Quintaglio Sigmund Freud.

The Quintaglio Ascension Trilogy has an underlying theme of standing up for the truth in the face of overwhelming opposition, of dedication to a cause no matter what. It champions new, innovative ideas overcoming fundamentalist dogma, of rationality overcoming mysticism. These themes are explored in other books by Robert J. Sawyer.

== Reception ==
The Quintaglio Ascension Trilogy has generally been very well received; the Toronto Star called Far-Seer "One of the year's outstanding SF books"", Far-Seer, Fossil Hunter and Foreigner consistently receive four- to five-star ratings in user reviews on amazon.com, and both Far-Seer and Fossil Hunter received Homer awards for "Best Novel" during their initial release dates. The books have been praised for their creativity, endearing characters, and social relevance. Sawyer has remarked in his short story anthology Iterations that the Quintaglio Ascension has generated the most fan-mail for anything he has written.

However, the series has received some negative criticism. Some reviewers have said that the Quintaglios act too human, while others point out the implausibility of a technological civilisation developing from a nomadic hunting society. Sawyer defends his work by stating that the human-like behavior of the Quintaglios was necessary for readers to connect with the characters, and that agriculture is not necessarily a pre-requisite for a developed civilisation (a point he explores in greater detail with his Neanderthal Parallax trilogy).

== See also ==
- "Uphill Climb"
- Robert J. Sawyer
