= Uphill Climb =

- Short story by Robert J. Sawyer
- Language: English
- Genre: Science fiction

Publication
- Published in: Amazing Stories
- Publication type: Magazine
- Publication date: March 1987

"Uphill Climb" is a 1987 short story written by Canadian science fiction author Robert J. Sawyer. It is the first print appearance of the Quintaglios, a species of sentient dwarf tyrannosaurs, which would later star in his critically acclaimed Quintaglio Ascension Trilogy. In was later reprinted in 2002 in Iterations, an anthology of short stories written by Robert J. Sawyer. It was reprinted again in 2019, this time in Sawyer's short story compilation volume Earth.

== See also ==
- Robert J. Sawyer
- Quintaglio Ascension Trilogy
