= Calculating God =

2000 novel by Robert J. Sawyer

- Author: Robert J. Sawyer
- Language: English
- Genre: Science fiction
- Set in: Earth, Betelgeuse
- Published: 2000
- Publisher: Tor Books
- Publication place: Canada
- OCLC: 300926060

Calculating God is a 2000 science fiction novel by Canadian writer Robert J. Sawyer. It takes place in the present day and describes the arrival of sentient aliens on Earth. The bulk of the novel covers the many discussions and arguments on this topic, as well as the nature of belief, religion, and science. Several planetary civilizations illustrate the logical conclusion of the Fermi paradox.

Calculating God received nominations for both the Hugo and John W. Campbell Memorial Awards in 2001.

== Plot summary ==
Thomas Jericho, a paleontologist working at the Royal Ontario Museum in Toronto, Canada makes the first human-to-alien contact when a "Forhilnor", a spider-like alien from the third planet of the Beta Hydri system arrives on Earth to investigate Earth's evolutionary history. The alien, Hollus, has come to Earth to gain access to the museum's large collection of fossils, and to study accumulated human knowledge in order to gather evidence of the existence of God. It appears that Earth and Hollus' home planet, and the home planet of another alien species traveling with Hollus, all experienced the same five cataclysmic events at roughly the same time. Hollus believes that the universe was created by a god, to provide a place where life could develop and evolve. Thomas Jericho is an atheist who provides a balance to the philosophical discussion regarding the existence of gods.

At the end, the star Betelgeuse goes supernova, threatening all life within hundreds of light-years with radiation. One of several dead civilizations discovered by the explorers may have deliberately induced the supernova in order to sterilize the stellar neighborhood. This was presumably done in order to protect the virtual reality machinery which now housed all of their planet's personalities. According to a theory of Thomas's, several worlds exist where the inhabitants uploaded themselves into machines instead of exploring the nature of the universe and gods.

Although the supernova explosion occurred over 400 years before the events of the novel, the radiation is first reaching Earth at the present time due to its distance from Earth. However, the alien ship's advanced telescope in orbit then sees a large black entity emerge from space itself and cover the exploding star. This is final proof that a controlling intelligence is guiding and preserving some life-forms in the universe.

In the final chapter, the scientist, who is dying of cancer, travels to the entity on the alien ship, where a fusion of genetic materials from human and alien sources produces a new life form that the aliens conjecture will create the next cycles of the universe.

== Controversy ==
Barry F. Seidman from Skeptical Inquirer accused Sawyer of having a religious anti-science agenda and promoting it with Calculating God and The Terminal Experiment, on the basis of the former using thoroughly refuted creationist arguments, such as irreducible complexity, fine-tuning, and evolution being "just a theory." He also condemned the suggestion therein that Carl Sagan and Stephen Jay Gould were secretly theists.

However, Sawyer addressed Skeptical Inquirer twice, explaining that Seidman had seriously misrepresented his work. Crucially, Seidman's review omitted that the only two villains in the novel are terrorists who bomb Thomas's museum compelled by their radical creationist beliefs. In addition, the last name of one of them is "Falsey", alluding to the falsehood of their views.

In fact, Seidman cited sentences from theist characters as if they reflected the novel's general stance on God, and in turn the author's. Previously, Sawyer clarified that he disagreed with the arguments for theism expressed in the novel. For example, to make the designer argument for fine-tuning more convincing, the novel portrays the multiverse hypothesis as implausible according to the aliens' research, while in reality Sawyer did not believe it to be so.

Sawyer also accused Seidman of repeatedly sending unsolicited emails to him. Further, he also opined that the skeptical community debunking his science-fiction novel was as ridiculous as Christian fundamentalists attacking the Harry Potter franchise.

== See also ==
- Fermi paradox
