= Farseer =

Farseer can refer to any of the following:

- Farseer trilogy, a series of novels by fantasy author Robin Hobb
- Far-Seer, the first book of the Quintaglio Ascension Trilogy by science fiction author Robert J. Sawyer
- A follower of the Eldar Path of the Seer, in the Warhammer 40,000 universe
