= The Oppenheimer Alternative =

2020 novel by Robert J. Sawyer

- Canadian first edition cover
- Author: Robert J. Sawyer
- Language: English
- Genre: Alternate history; Science fiction
- Publisher: Red Deer Press (CA); CAEZIK SF & F (US)
- Publication date: June 2, 2020
- Publication place: Canada; United States
- Media type: Trade paperback
- Pages: 374
- ISBN: 978-0-8899-5617-9 (CA); 978-1-64710-013-1 (US)

The Oppenheimer Alternative is a 2020 science fiction alternate history novel by Canadian writer Robert J. Sawyer. It was first published in June 2020 in Canada by Red Deer Press, and in the United States by CAEZIK SF & Fantasy, 75 years after the atomic bombings of Hiroshima and Nagasaki in 1945. The novel was nominated for The Canadian Science Fiction and Fantasy Association's 2021 Aurora Award for Best Novel.

The Oppenheimer Alternative explores J. Robert Oppenheimer's role in the Manhattan Project during World War II, and his subsequent security clearance hearings in the mid-1950s. It also tackles his handling of the fictional discovery that the Sun's core is unstable and will shed its outer layer in the late-2020s, engulfing the inner Solar System, including Earth. Sawyer stated that many of the events that take place in the novel are factual, and most of the characters are dramatizations of historical figures, including Albert Einstein, Hans Bethe, Edward Teller, Enrico Fermi, Leo Szilard and Wernher von Braun. In 2024, Sawyer called The Oppenheimer Alternative his best novel so far.

== Background ==
Sawyer said in an interview with SciFiPulse.Net that the inspiration for The Oppenheimer Alternative came from The Inventor of All Things, a play he had seen about Leo Szilard, the first person to foresee the nuclear chain reaction. This prompted Sawyer to start researching Szilard, which led to the Manhattan Project. The people involved, Oppenheimer, Szilard, Edward Teller, Leslie Groves, Albert Einstein, were "larger than life" and were "irresistible to write about". Sawyer realized that Oppenheimer "was the perfect main character for my kind of science fiction, which deals with the ethics and morality of science and technology." He said the novel is "a tale of the search for redemption".

Sawyer stipulated that The Oppenheimer Alternative must be published in 2020, the 75th anniversary of the atomic bombings of Hiroshima and Nagasaki, and he rejected all offers from publishers who were unable to meet this deadline. Sawyer anticipated that the anniversary would rekindle debate on the ethics of the nuclear attack on Japan in 1945. Since his teenage years, Sawyer had questioned the morality of the United States government's decision to bomb Japan when the war in Europe had ended. The official reason given was to prevent the huge loss of lives an invasion of Japan would incur, but Sawyer said in an interview with Postmedia that it was later established that the bombing was largely a show of force for Stalin. Sawyer added: "What shocked me when I was doing this research was to discover that Japan had been making back-channel overtures to surrender for a year before the bombs were dropped on Hiroshima and Nagasaki".

Sawyer told SciFiPulse.Net that Franklin D. Roosevelt had insisted that Japan surrender unconditionally, whereas if he had allowed them to retain Hirohito, their emperor, the war would have ended much earlier and there would have been no need to drop the bombs. Sawyer said "the atomic-bomb effort was really aimed at showing the Soviets who was going to be boss in the post-war world, rather than about saving American lives".

== Plot summary ==
The first half of The Oppenheimer Alternative covers the Manhattan Project during World War II and the development of the atomic bomb. Oppenheimer heads the project and consults with some of the world's leading physicists and scientists, including Hans Bethe, Edward Teller, Enrico Fermi, Leo Szilard and Albert Einstein. But when the bomb is finished and tested in July 1945, Oppenheimer starts to have reservations about what it is that he has created, and recites the following from the Bhagavad Gita: "Now I am become Death, the destroyer of worlds".

After the bombing of Hiroshima and Nagasaki in August 1945, Teller discovers later that year that the Sun's core is unstable and will eject its photosphere sometime in the late 2020s, engulfing the inner Solar System, including Earth. Oppenheimer reassembles the Manhattan Project scientists, plus computer scientist John von Neumann and rocket engineer Wernher von Braun, to either shield Earth from the explosion, or evacuate as many people as possible to Mars. To avoid mass panic, this impending catastrophe is kept secret, even from the US government. During Oppenheimer's security clearance hearings in the mid-1950s, the crucial role he is playing in the project to save mankind is not revealed.

== Critical reception ==
Reviewing The Oppenheimer Alternative in Locus magazine, American science fiction writer Paul Di Filippo praised Sawyer for his "magnificent job" in bringing his cast of "brainy and idiosyncratic" characters to life, "fully integrated both into their era and amongst themselves." Di Filippo was impressed with Sawyer's sensitive handling of Oppenheimer's security clearance hearings, and in particular, the book's ending, with its "poignant yet hopeful conclusion to Oppenheimer’s long, partly-selfless, partly-egocentric journey."

In a review in Amazing Stories, Steve Fahnestalk called the book, "people-oriented plausible SF". He described the historical section as "a brilliant bit of writing" that brings to life the scientists, physicists and events that led up to the Atomic Age. Fahnestalk stated that the science fiction part of the story and the way it is introduced is "extremely clever", and he was impressed how its "pretty conundrum ... was brilliantly solved by the end of the book". In another review of the novel in Amazing Stories, R. Graeme Cameron called the ending "the 'one impossible thing' allowed to SF writers per individual work". He said it was "the perfect solution" to saving humanity, and took the book from "alternate history into the realm of bravura science fiction extrapolation in keeping with the most daring SF concepts offered in the past."

Publishers Weekly stated that the novel's scientific and historical depth is "impressive", but complained that the "communist paranoia" tended to interfere with the story's plot. The reviewer felt that while Oppenheimer's love life is "poorly handled", his characterization, in particular his "morals, genius, and grief" is "well done". Writing in SF Crowsnest, GF Willmetts stated that Sawyer's depiction of the scientists and their impact on world events, closely tracks what really happened. But he called the book's ending "somewhat a spoiler". Willmetts complained that Sawyer does not explain or describe the machine used to send Oppenheimer to the past. He said, "I think what nags me the most is switching from a pending apocalypse and back into events that affected Oppenheimer in the past and his determination to remedy it", because it plays no part in saving humanity from the coming catastrophe.

== Work cited ==
- Sawyer, Robert J. (2020). The Oppenheimer Alternative (eBook ed.). SFWRITER.COM Inc. ISBN 978-1-988415-23-9.
