= Foreigner (Sawyer novel) =

1994 novel by Robert J. Sawyer

- First edition The character depicted is Wab-Novato, the mate of the series' protagonist, Sal-Afsan.
- Author: Robert J. Sawyer
- Cover artist: Bob Eggleton
- Language: English
- Series: Quintaglio Ascension Trilogy
- Genre: Science fiction
- Publisher: Ace Books
- Publication date: March 1994
- Publication place: Canada
- Media type: Print (hardback & paperback)
- Pages: 317
- ISBN: 0-441-00017-7
- Preceded by: Fossil Hunter

Foreigner is a science fiction novel by the Canadian author Robert J. Sawyer, originally published in 1994 by Ace Books. It is the final book of the Quintaglio Ascension Trilogy, following Far-Seer and Fossil Hunter. The book depicts an Earth-like world on a moon which orbits a gas giant, inhabited by a species of highly evolved, sentient Tyrannosaurs called Quintaglios, among various other creatures from the late Cretaceous period, imported to this moon by aliens 65 million years earlier.

== Plot summary ==
In the beginning of the novel, Afsan is accidentally run over by a chariot, causing severe crush injuries to his face. As Quintaglios can regenerate large amounts of tissue, Afsan heals, and in the process, his eyes, which were cut out by Yenalb in Far-Seer, also regenerate. However, Afsan does not regain his sight, despite having fully anatomically functional eyes. Believing suggestions that the issue may be psychological, he consults Mokleb, who has recently pioneered the new field of psychoanalysis. While this does not cause him to regain his sight, it does cure the chronic nightmares and insomnia he suffered after setting up the royal culling in Fossil Hunter.

With the moon on which the Quintaglios live continuing its inward spiral towards the giant planet known as the "Face of God", the death of their world continues to put a forced acceleration of Quintaglio scientific advancement. Within the discovered Jijaki spacecraft, the Quintaglios accidentally trigger the formation of a tower of kiit – a blue nanotech material. Much to their astonishment, this tower extends all the way to the Lagrangian point above the moon's surface. Novato ventures upwards, making a monumental discovery: she discovers that there is a sort of surveillance camera system overlooking all of the worlds to which the "Watcher" (from Fossil Hunter) had the Jijaki transport life from Sol III (Earth). Staying to watch, she glimpses many life-forms, including red blob-like creatures, Quintaglios, and humans. She also notices that several cameras are returning black screens, unsettling her as to the possible meaning. Proceeding to explore the structure at the top of the tower, she accidentally opens an airlock, nearly killing her. While saved by the emergency systems, she realizes that the Quintaglio aviation advancements up to that point will not be sufficient to evacuate their moon, as there is no air in space on which winged aircraft can fly.

Meanwhile, Toroca makes an equally astounding discovery – another sapient species of saurian, the "Others", inhabiting a small archipelago on the other side of the moon from the continent known as Land. Though resembling the Quintaglios, these dinosaurs are markedly different both in physiology and psychology; most significantly, they are smaller, use weapons and cook meat, are capable of lying, and have a reduced sexual dimorphism, the last of which causes all Quintaglios except for Toroca – who has no territorial instincts – to immediately enter dagamant. After Captain Keenir kills two of the "Others" in such a frenzy, Toroca attempts to negotiate, with partial success. However, the Others eventually decide that the Quintaglios are a threat to their survival and decide to exterminate them, sending a huge fleet for Land. In a last-ditch attempt to settle the dispute, Toroca brings Afsan to one of the ships, where he is shot. Toroca and Afsan narrowly escape. Dybo, informed by Keenir in advance, has set a trap for the Others, using the prototype aircraft as bomber planes. They drop a napalm-like substance on the enemy fleet, destroying most of it at the cost of their gliders also getting wrecked. The remaining ships are finally trampled by a herd of Thunderbeasts in the shallow waters of the bay, lured there by Cadool and his hunting party.

Afsan does eventually regain his sight, but shortly thereafter dies from his wounds. Toroca, having rescued a child of the Others, raises it as his own.

In an epilogue, the Quintaglios have successfully achieved spaceflight, and send a great many starships out to many planets, including at least one – the Dasheter – to Earth, the original homeworld. Other advancements have been made as well; for example, the Dasheter is navigated by an AI named Afsan, built to mimic the mannerisms of the long-dead astronomer.

== Major themes ==
Following the style of the previous two novels in the trilogy, Foreigner displays the interaction between science and religion. Just as Afsan was the equivalent of Galileo and Toroca of Charles Darwin, Mokleb corresponds to Sigmund Freud, having pioneered a new form of psychology - psychoanalysis.

Parts of the book were meant to critique the Catholic Church's position on abortion and birth control. Some other science vs. religion themes have been downplayed in comparison with their role in Far-Seer, as the religions of the Quintaglios have partly faded in prominence.
