= Triggers (novel) =

2012 book by Robert J. Sawyer

- First edition cover
- Author: Robert J. Sawyer
- Cover artist: Stephan Martiniere
- Language: English
- Genre: Science fiction
- Publisher: Viking
- Publication date: 2012
- Media type: Print (Hardcover & Paperback)
- Pages: 342
- ISBN: 978-0-670-06576-9
- OCLC: 767940725

Triggers is a science fiction novel by Canadian writer Robert J. Sawyer. It was originally serialized in Analog.

== Plot summary ==
In the near future, a war veteran named Kadeem Adams is about to undergo a highly experimental memory editing treatment for post-traumatic stress disorder at Washington, D.C.'s Luther Terry Hospital. Seth Jerrison, the President of the United States, is rushed to the same hospital after being shot in an assassination attempt. Adams' treatment goes awry due to an electromagnetic pulse from a new type of bomb planted by terrorists, which destroys the White House just as the treatment begins. It becomes clear that terrorists have infiltrated the Secret Service.

When President Jerrison recovers consciousness, he can remember Kadeem Adams' life as well as his own. Kadeem Adams finds himself able to remember the life of someone else who was nearby in the hospital, and others nearby are similarly affected. This raises the possibility that someone in the vicinity has access to President Jerrison's memories, some of which are extremely secret; these include plans for a major, morally questionable, anti-terrorist action codenamed Counter Punch.

In large part, the book has a thriller type plot. Learning how the memories of many of the characters were intertwined is a key to such things as finding who has the President's memories and who the terrorists are. However, much of the book is about the characters and interactions of the people whose minds have been subjected to what is suggested to be quantum entanglement. Not all of them are good people. After one of them dies, the quantum entanglement gets stronger rather than weaker.

== Critical reaction ==
Critical reaction varied, especially regarding the book's ending. Writing in the Globe and Mail, Michael Matheson simultaneously criticized the ending as utopian and described it as "chilling". Leo Graziani considered it optimistic. Alex Good called it "cybertopian" In the Toronto Star.

== TV adaption ==
In 2014, Sawyer was commissioned to adapt Triggers into a film.
