= Rollback (novel) =

2007 novel by Robert J. Sawyer

- Hardcover edition
- Author: Robert J. Sawyer
- Language: English
- Genre: Science fiction
- Publisher: Tor Books
- Publication date: April 2007 (1st edition)
- Publication place: Canada
- Media type: Print (Hardback and Paperback)
- Pages: 320 (1st edition)
- ISBN: 0-7653-1108-9 (1st edition hardcover)
- OCLC: 76820964
- Dewey Decimal: 813/.54 22
- LC Class: PR9199.3.S2533 R65 2007

Rollback is a 2007 science fiction novel by Canadian author Robert J. Sawyer that was serialized in four parts in Analog Science Fiction and Fact from October 2006 to January 2007. It deals primarily with the social effects of drastic age rejuvenation technology and first contact theory. In 2008 the novel was nominated for a Hugo Award and a Campbell Award.

== Plot summary ==
The novel focuses around Don Halifax and his wife of sixty years, Sarah, an astronomer who translated the first transmission sent from an extraterrestrial source to Earth 38 years prior to the opening of the story. Sarah, now 87, is tasked to decode the second message sent from the unknown alien race—if she can live long enough to do so. A wealthy industrial billionaire, Cody McGavin, offers to put up billions of dollars to perform a "rollback" on not only Sarah but Don as well. This process, which reverts a person's body to its condition when the subject was 25 years old, is successfully performed on Don, but fails to work with Sarah. This leaves Sarah gradually creeping toward death while Don's life begins anew. Much of the story focuses on Don as he discovers the advantages and disadvantages of being young again, with periodic flashbacks to when Sarah translated the first alien message.
