= Illegal Alien (Sawyer novel) =

1997 novel by Robert J. Sawyer

- First US edition (paperback)
- Author: Robert J. Sawyer
- Cover artist: Danilo Ducak
- Language: English
- Genre: Science fiction
- Publisher: Ace Books
- Publication date: December 1997
- Publication place: Canada
- Media type: Print (hardback & paperback)
- Pages: 304
- ISBN: 0-441-00592-6
- OCLC: 40495547

Illegal Alien is a science fiction and mystery novel by Canadian novelist Robert J. Sawyer. The book won the 2002 Seiun Award, in Japan (where it was published by Hayakawa Books), for Best Foreign Novel.

The novel was published in hardback in December 1997, and appeared in paperback in England in January 1998 and in the United States in January 1999.

== Plot ==
An alien spacecraft arrives on Earth, contact is established, and the two peoples begin to learn about each other. Frank Nobilio, Science Advisor to the American president, and Cletus Calhoun (a Tennessee hillbilly popularizer of science, somewhat like Carl Sagan), are the two main ambassadors to the aliens (who call themselves Tosoks). The Tosoks explain that their ship was damaged in the Kuiper belt (during initial attempted repairs, one of the eight Tosoks died), and they are assured that humans can provide or build the tools necessary to fix it. This will take about two years. Things go well for over a year, with the Tosoks taking a tour of the major civilized countries of Earth, during which they view and are impressed by the August 11, 1999, total solar eclipse.

Then Cletus Calhoun is found dead, under circumstances that place one of the aliens, Hask, under suspicion. Calhoun bled to death when his leg was completely severed with a tool unknown to human forensic pathologists; also, his jaw, one eye, and his appendix have been removed and are never found. Hask appears while the police are investigating and, in the Tosok fashion, has shed his skin; it is speculated that he did so in order to hide any tell-tale blood splatters. Hask is arrested for murder, and the remainder of the novel concerns Hask's trial in a Los Angeles, California court.

Hask maintains that he never murdered Calhoun, who was his friend. His attorney, Dale Rice, an African-American who is famous for defending civil and political rights cases, believes that another Tosok murdered Calhoun for deviant reasons; the Tosoks have as strong a taboo about internal anatomy as most humans do about sex: it is a private matter, not to be shared with others, except for extreme cases, such as surgery. Rice speculates that the Tosok surgeon might be the murderer, or the Tosok named Ged, who shows signs of unnatural interest in the courtroom discussions of internal anatomy, or even the eighth Tosok, reported dead, who might be alive and in hiding.

When Rice brings this last hypothesis to the courtroom, Hask is alarmed and announces that he wants to change his plea to guilty. Rice tells Hask that his duty is to defend him. Small things that the other Tosoks do (for example, the surgeon, Stant, pleads the Fifth while on the witness stand) lead Frank and Rice to suspect that the Tosoks are hiding more than one truth from them.

At last Hask persuades Rice to take a day off court duty, and they and Frank secretly travel to the Arctic, where the eighth Tosok, Seltar, is indeed alive. They explain to Frank and Rice that the other Tosoks are determined, because of a combination of religious beliefs and a desire to protect the Tosok species, to destroy all intelligent life on Earth, including animals that might evolve intelligence. Most Tosoks share this determination, and they have already exterminated life on other planets.

Hask admits that he was responsible for Calhoun's death, but had not wanted to kill him, only to restrain him. Calhoun had come across Hask secretly communicating with Seltar, his beloved mate; Seltar was to be responsible for destroying the mothership when the Tosok leader, Kelkad, had received repairs to the ship and could then wipe out the humans, hence the need for the story about her death.

Armed with this information, the police confront the six complicit Tosoks. Kelkad realizes that Hask has betrayed them and runs to kill him; Hask kills Kelkad instead. The remaining five Tosoks are imprisoned. In the Epilogue, aliens from a different planet arrive on Earth, explain that they were to be victims of the Tosok genocide but succeeding in fighting back, and will take the Tosok prisoners with them to make them pay for their crimes. Dale Rice, always the champion of the underdog, goes with them into space to become defense attorney for the accused Tosoks.

== Themes ==
The book contains several references to the O. J. Simpson trial, and it was in fact inspired by that trial. Sawyer (a Canadian) referred to the novel as "an outsider's view of American justice."

There are a number of pungent comments about the justice system, such as when a juror is discovered to be a "UFO nut" and is dismissed from the jury. While questioning the juror about the truthfulness about her answers to the pre-selection jury questionnaire, the judge uses the terms "UFO" and "flying saucer" synonymously, whilst the juror distinguishes them as different things. Told she should have answered the question in the spirit it was asked, and that the Court wants "the truth, the whole truth, and nothing but the truth," the juror rebuts:

Forgive me, Your Honor, but it's been quite clear throughout this case that you want nothing of the kind. I've seen [defense] and [prosecution] cut off all sorts of answers because they were more than either of them wanted the jury to hear. By every example I've ever seen, the Court wants specific answers to the narrow, specific questions posed—and I provided just that.
