= Flashforward (novel) =

1999 novel by Robert J. Sawyer

- Cover of the Hardback edition.
- Author: Robert J. Sawyer
- Language: English
- Genre: Science fiction
- Publisher: Tor Books
- Publication date: 1999
- Publication place: United States/Canada
- Media type: Print (Hardcover and paperback)
- Pages: 320
- ISBN: 0-312-86712-3
- OCLC: 41035395
- Dewey Decimal: 813/.54 21
- LC Class: PR9199.3.S2533 F58 1999

Flashforward is a science fiction novel by Canadian author Robert J. Sawyer first published in 1999. The novel is set in 2009. At CERN, the Large Hadron Collider accelerator is performing a run to search for the Higgs boson. The experiment has a unique side effect; the entire human race loses their consciousness for about two minutes. During that time, nearly everyone sees themselves roughly twenty-one years and six months in the future. Each individual experiences the future through the senses of their future self. This "flashforward" results in countless deaths and accidents involving vehicles, aircraft, and any other device needing human control at the time of the experiment. The novel was adapted into the 2009 television series FlashForward.

== Plot summary ==
Lloyd Simcoe, a 45-year-old Canadian particle physicist, oversees a run of the Large Hadron Collider. He works with his fiancée Michiko Kamura, who has a daughter, Tamiko. The experiment unexpectedly brings about a vision of a plausible future in which the characters are twenty years older. The consequences include the death of Tamiko as an out-of-control vehicle plows into her school. No recording devices in the world function in the present during the event. Citing the absence of any human awareness during that time, this is interpreted as evidence of the observer effect in quantum theory.

The deaths of several characters (the ones who see nothing) are forecast by the flashforward. This includes Lloyd's friend and fellow researcher Theo Procopides, who learns of a prediction that he will be killed. The story begins to take on the features of a murder mystery, as Theo attempts to prevent his own murder. As time goes by it becomes clear that the events of the future are not predestined. Some people, including Theo's brother Dimitrios, commit suicide after becoming depressed by visions of their own dismal futures. Other characters rush to make these futures a reality. Jake Horowitz from CERN sees himself participating in his first sexual relationship.

At CERN, less than two months after the original flashforward, the scientists plan a repeat of the run, but this time warning the world of the exact time, so that preparations can be made. However, no flashforward occurs, and the LHC instead finds the Higgs boson - the intended result of the first experiment. Soon after, the flashforward is found to be the result of neutrino pulses coincident with events at the collider. With the quark star remnant of supernova 1987A randomly emitting neutrinos when it experiences a starquake, an early warning system is set up on a satellite to ascertain the time of the next possible flashforward. Unbeknownst to him, Lloyd is put on a list by a billionaire interested in immortality.

The next flashforward is engineered for the same date experienced in the characters' visions. By this time, Theo has evaded his murderer, Lloyd has broken up with Michiko and Jake is happily married to a woman named Carly Tompkins as predicted by the flashforward. All the people in the world sit / lie down but most of them do not see anything. Lloyd becomes one of the few people to experience another flashforward and sees himself travelling through the galaxy billions of years in the future, using an artificial body supplied by immortality researchers. The philanthropist approaches Lloyd and offers to prolong his life but Lloyd does not wish to accept this without his current wife Doreen. When he changes the future by refusing, it is implied that the treatment will be offered to Theo. Meanwhile, Theo contacts Michiko, acting on romantic feelings he has had for twenty years.

== Philosophical and scientific issues discussed ==
The novel discusses free will and determinism, the Copenhagen interpretation, transactional interpretation and the Omega Point. The last is put in a Christian context, through the character of Cheung, the rich Christian capitalist who finances the immortality project. In a "NewsFlash" in the novel, a character named Pope Benedict XVI (a reference which proved prescient since the novel was published 1999, Cardinal Joseph Ratzinger did become Pope Benedict XVI in 2005 and was still pope in 2009, the time frame of the novel) reserves judgement on whether the Flashforward was a miracle or not.

== TV adaptation ==
The FlashForward television series based loosely on the novel aired on ABC between September 24, 2009, and May 27, 2010. It differs from the novel by following non-scientists, including lead characters FBI Special Agent Mark Benford (Joseph Fiennes), Special Agent Demetri Noh (John Cho), and an FBI team investigating the Flashforward. The adaptation also changes the blackout time from under two minutes to two minutes and seventeen seconds, as well as the flashforward moving consciousness six months forward, not twenty-one years; time progresses normally during the event, and security cameras capture footage of people blacked out for the full-time period. A character named Lloyd Simcoe does appear. However, he only partly resembles the character in the novel.

The story was also changed from taking place primarily in Geneva, Switzerland, (at and around the CERN facility), to the United States, primarily Los Angeles, California. Also, the flashforward event was portrayed as a terrorist attack, as opposed to the result of unforeseen circumstances.

== See also ==
- Four-dimensional space
- Minkowski space
- Spacetime
