= Wake (Sawyer novel) =

2009 novel by Robert J. Sawyer

- Cover of the Canadian first edition of Wake
- Author: Robert J. Sawyer
- Language: English
- Series: WWW Trilogy
- Genre: Science fiction
- Publisher: Viking Canada
- Publication date: April 7, 2009
- Publication place: Canada
- Media type: Print (hardcover, paperback), audiobook, e-book
- Pages: 354 (first edition)
- ISBN: 978-0-670-06741-1
- Followed by: Watch

Wake, also called WWW: Wake, is a 2009 novel written by Canadian novelist Robert J. Sawyer and the first book in his WWW Trilogy. It was first serialized in four parts in Analog Science Fiction and Fact from November 2008 to March 2009, was first published in book form on April 8, 2009, and was followed by Watch in 2010 and by Wonder in 2011 (both novels are not serialized in Analog). The novel details the spontaneous emergence of an intelligence on the World Wide Web, called Webmind, and its friendship with a blind teenager named Caitlin.

Sawyer developed the initial idea for Wake in January 2003 when he wrote in his diary about the emergence of consciousness on the World Wide Web. The novel was named a 2010 Hugo Award nominee in the category for Best Novel and won a 2009 Aurora Award.

== Plot ==
Wake is set in 2012. Fifteen-year-old Caitlin Decter has been blind from birth. The Decter family recently moved from Austin, Texas to Waterloo, Ontario after Caitlin's father, Malcolm, received a job at the Perimeter Institute. Caitlin is emailed by Dr. Masayuki Kuroda, a scientist specializing in "signal processing related to V1." He believes that her blindness is caused by her retinas miscoding the visual information and offers to install a signal processor behind her left eye to unscramble the data. The device sends the data to a miniature computer, or "eyePod", which reprocesses the signals and returns them. The correct data is sent to her optic nerve, theoretically granting her sight. In duplex mode it sends and receives the signals, and in simplex mode it only sends them. Caitlin and her mother, Barbara, fly to Tokyo for the procedure. Although her pupils now react to light, Caitlin still cannot see. They return to Canada while Dr. Kuroda works on updating the software.

A bird-flu epidemic with a mortality rate of at least 90% has begun in China. Dr. Quan Li, a senior member of the Communist Party, recommends the President order a culling of ten to eleven thousand people in the infected area with an airborne chemical. The President agrees and launches the Changcheng Strategy, cutting off all telephone, satellite, and wireless communication with the rest of the world, so that word of the culling does not spread beyond China's borders. Wong Wai-Jeng, a freedom blogger who is known online as Sinanthropus, attempts to circumvent Internet censorship in China along with many other hackers. Collectively they learn about the bird flu outbreak. Many days after enacting the Changcheng Strategy, Zhang Bo, the Minister of Communications, convinces the President to restore communications. The moment they are back up, Sinanthropus posts a blog, informing the world of the bird flu outbreak and the culling. He is tracked down by the police and, while attempting to flee, breaks his leg and is captured.

The first software update Kuroda attempts is a partial success. Although Caitlin can still not see the outside world, it enables her to visualize the World Wide Web while the update downloads when the eyePod is in duplex mode. Dr. Kuroda speculates that the data being transmitted between the eyePod and his server in Tokyo is being interpreted by her optic nerve, allowing her to see this. He decides to travel to Waterloo to work with Caitlin on the implant more directly. In the interim, he suggests sending the retinal feed from her eyePod to his Tokyo server through Jagster, a fictional search engine, so that he can monitor how she reacts to different inputs. He dubs her ability to visualize the internet "websight". Caitlin notes that, along with websites and links, she can visualize a background in websight that looks like a chess board. Dr. Kuroda speculates that the background is made up of cellular automata, which Caitlin suggests is caused by corrupted packet loss. Several Zipf plots are run of the cellular automata, which has a negative one slope. The Decters, Dr. Kuroda, and Anna Bloom, a network cartographer, realize that means the cellular automata contain intelligent content, which Anna suggests is secret communications from the National Security Agency. They decide to keep investigating the cellular automata discreetly.

In San Diego, California, Shoshana Glick, an ape-language researcher and graduate student, works at the Marcuse Institute, a primate research centre. Hobo, a chimpanzee-bonobo hybrid, communicates by sign language. Doctor Harl Marcuse, the owner of the Institute, sets up a connection with the Miami Zoo. Hobo communicates with an orangutan named Virgil in the first interspecies webcam call. The Marcuse Institute and Miami Zoo agree to announce the chat jointly, but the Miami Zoo leaks word of it to New Scientist, who go to the Georgia Zoo – Hobo's birthplace – for information on him. Georgia Zoo, fearing about the contamination between the captive chimpanzee and bonobo bloodlines, demand Hobo be returned to them so that he can be sterilized. Hobo paints a portrait of Shoshana, surprising everyone at the Institute as it had been believed that chimpanzees could only paint abstractly. Dr. Marcuse theorizes that the communication with Virgil had shown Hobo "how three-dimensional objects could be reduced to two dimensions." The Marcuse Institute decide to record Hobo painting a second time and then go public, believing that the outcry over sterilizing him would force the Georgia Zoo to back down from their plans. The Georgia Zoo issues a lawsuit, planning to castrate Hobo.

Dr. Kuroda sets up a final software patch. While at school, Caitlin decides to take a break from her work and switches the eyePod to duplex mode so she can look through websight. It fails to load and, disappointed, she returns the eyePod to simplex mode. She sees several lines crossing her field of vision and is surprised when she realizes that they are the edge of a lab bench and that she can now see. Barbara picks Caitlin up from school and informs her about the patch. Malcolm runs Shannon entropy graphs on the cellular automata to gauge how complex the information in them is. He shows Caitlin how to run it, and they discover that the information has little complexity. Dr. Kuroda holds a press conference, announcing the success of his invention that has made Caitlin able to see. Caitlin receives an electric shock which crashes the eyePod. She reboots it in duplex mode and sees a mirrored representation of her face in websight.

An intelligence has spontaneously emerged on the Web. Cleaved in two when the Changcheng Strategy was enacted, the restoration of communications by China causes the two halves to coalesce, and it gains in intelligence. The intelligence can view Caitlin's eyePod feed. It believes that her vision is an attempt to communicate with it and, when her eyePod was rebooted, it sent an image of Caitlin in an attempt to communicate back. As Caitlin begins to learn how to read letters, the intelligence believes it is a further attempt to communicate and learns with her. When she switches to duplex mode, it takes that act to be a reward for its learning progress. Caitlin believes it to be "visual noise" as a result of gaining sight. Dr. Kuroda looks at the information on his server, and Caitlin realizes that the information is her reading exercises being bounced back to her. She then runs another Shannon entropy scan, realising that the information in the cellular automata has increased in intelligence. Caitlin deduces that the information is trying to communicate with her and decides to help it. Dr. Kuroda feels it is now time to return to Japan and informs her that, as she can now see, he will remove the duplex setting from her eyePod. Caitlin convinces him to keep it as is so that she can continue to see websight. She runs another Shannon entropy plot and realizes that the intelligence has increased yet again. She continues with her teaching efforts, leading the intelligence to different websites so that it can continue learning. She runs the Shannon entropy a fourth and fifth time and finds that the intelligence is double that of human complexity.

The intelligence contacts Caitlin via email and wishes her a happy birthday. It thanks her for helping it to learn and invites her to communicate with it through instant messenger. She asks it what she should call it, and the intelligence replies "Webmind". Webmind and Caitlin decide to go forwards together.

== Development ==
Wake was conceptualized on 10 January 2003, when Sawyer said in his diary "Wrote 300 words explaining how I was going to expand Shed Skin into a novel to be called Skins, and, after wracking my brain for a couple of hours, came up with an idea that I liked for a second novel: consciousness emerges on the World Wide Web. Admittedly, not completely original (Clarke's short story Dial F for Frankenstein comes to mind), but I checked on Amazon.com and Google, and couldn't find any book that had actually done this." It was planned as a single novel, but was later expanded into a trilogy.

== Themes ==
Sawyer noted that Wake contains themes of "the nature of perception and how it shapes our view of reality; how much humans are in fact programmed by evolution, and whether humanity can overcome that programming; and what, if any, value consciousness has." He added that he was "very interested in trying to find a new synthesis, a new approach to the question of what happens once something more intelligent than we are emerges here. Is there a way out of the standard science-fictional paradigm that has us subjugated or wiped out, as seen in The Matrix and The Terminator, and going all the way back to Colossus: The Forbin Project and before? Is there a compelling argument to be made for us being able to continue, with our essential humanity intact, once true AI is on the scene?"

== Release ==
Wake was serialized in the November 2008, December 2008, combined January–February 2009, and March 2009 issues of Analog Science Fiction and Fact magazine. It was published in April 2009 by Penguin Canada's Viking imprint. In the United States it was released under the title WWW: Wake. The book was followed by two sequels, Watch (2010) and Wonder (2011).

An unabridged audiobook was released by Audible Frontiers on 7 April 2009, coinciding with the date of American publication. The Wake audiobook has a runtime of 12 hours and 13 minutes. The voice cast includes Jessica Almasy, Jennifer Van Dyck, A.C. Fellner, Marc Vietor, and Robert J. Sawyer.

== Reception ==
Critical reception for Wake has been mostly positive. The SF Site praised the novel overall, but commented that the character of Caitlin was "too perfect" at times. SF Signal also wrote a positive review and stated that although they felt that the explanation of Webmind's existence was overly long, the novel as a whole was exemplary. The Globe and Mail was more mixed in their review, as they felt that several parts of the novel were awkward and that while they did enjoy the book, "none of the characters feel fully formed yet, though hopefully this will change with the next two books of the trilogy."

=== Awards ===
- Aurora Award (2009, won)
- Hugo Award (2009, nominated)
