= Fossil Hunter =

1993 novel by Robert J. Sawyer

- First edition The character depicted is Kee-Toroca, the main protagonist. He is the son of Sal-Afsan, the main character from the previous book.
- Author: Robert J. Sawyer
- Cover artist: Bob Eggleton
- Language: English
- Series: Quintaglio Ascension Trilogy
- Genre: Science fiction
- Publisher: Ace Books
- Publication date: May 1993
- Publication place: Canada
- Media type: Print (hardback & paperback)
- Pages: 290
- ISBN: 0-441-24884-5
- Preceded by: Far-Seer
- Followed by: Foreigner

Fossil Hunter is a novel written by Canadian science fiction author Robert J. Sawyer. The sequel to Far-Seer, it is the second book of the Quintaglio Ascension Trilogy. The book depicts an Earth-like world on a moon which orbits a gas giant, inhabited by a species of highly evolved, sentient Tyrannosaurs called Quintaglios, among various other creatures from the late cretaceous period, imported to this moon by aliens 65 million years prior to the story. Originally published in 1993 by Ace Science Fiction, it won the Homer award for "Best Novel" during its initial release date. It was reissued in 2005 by Tor Books.

== Plot summary ==
The story takes place roughly sixteen years after the events of Far-Seer. In lieu of Afsan's discovery of the Quintaglio's real place in the universe, the Larskian faith has been abolished and worship of the Original Five hunters reinstated. Dybo is now the Emperor, with Afsan as his court astrologer, and Novato has been put in charge of the Quintaglio Exodus; a project meant to help the Quintaglios escape from their doomed world before it breaks apart. Toroca, son of Afsan and Novato, is now head of the Geological Survey of Land, meant to take a global inventory of the resources available for the Exodus project.

In some of the oldest rocks, Toroca finds a mysterious blue artifact, which is made of a seemingly indestructible material despite containing moving parts. He also finds evidence contradicting creation myths from the Book of Lubal. The world appears to be much older than five thousand kilodays, due to the rate of erosion being too slow, and during an expedition to the South Pole, he finds that it is inhabited entirely by many unique types of Wingfingers. Toroca hypothesises that they evolved from a common wingfinger ancestor.

Rodlox, governor of the province Edz'Toolar, claims to be Dybo's brother and mounts a challenge to his rule. As Afsan had previously suspected in Far-Seer, Rodlox asserts that the eight children of the previous Empress were exempted from the culling of the Bloodpriests and that he is the strongest among them. The Bloodpriests, who are the only providers of birthcontrol, flee in the resulting turmoil leaving the territorial Quintaglios overpopulated and at risk of civil war. To ensure that the Exodus continues, Afsan suggests that Dybo can win the battle Rodlox is asking for if he involves all eight royal children with a Blackdeath playing the role of a Bloodpriest.

Toroco finds himself attracted to Babnol, a member of the Geological Survey, but she throws the blue artifact overboard in protest of his obsession with it. Returning to the original site, the team looks for another artifact in the cliff face but finds an enormous blue building containing the mummified remains of extinct or alien creatures. Meanwhile, Afsan finds out that two of his children have been murdered with the weapon being a broken mirror. Suspicion falls upon another of Afsan's children, Drawtood, who has developed paranoia from the experience of having siblings. When confronted, Drawtood confesses and commits suicide.

When the battle against the Blackdeath begins, six of the challengers are devoured with Rodlox lasting the longest. Dybo on the other hand has studied Tyrannosaur behaviour and survives the battle by making himself look like a juvenile Blackdeath; the other remaining survivor concedes victory to Dybo. When Dybo's rule is secure, the Bloodpriests are reinstated including a dying Imperial Bloodpriest who has been injured in the territorial frenzy. He reveals that they switched the strongest royal child with the weakest to usher in a less violent generation. Afsan and Dybo choose Toroca to be the next Imperial Bloodpriest due to his knowledge of evolution. Meanwhile, Wab-Novato builds and tests a prototype glider, based on bird remains recovered from the giant blue structure.

Studies of the blue artifact reveal that it is a starship responsible for populating the Quintaglio's world millions of years ago. The book ends with Dybo declaring that the Quintaglios are not merely going to the stars; they are going home.

== Musings of The Watcher ==
Also complementing the main plot are the "Musings of the Watcher", interspersed through the book and told in flashback from the first person perspective of a god-like entity whose consciousness has survived from the previous cycle of creation in which life was more abundant.

Among the many creatures spread from the crucible throughout the universe by the Watcher, a sapient Opabinia-derived species called the Jijaki becomes the first to worship him. When the Jijaki develop blue ramscoop ships, the Watcher creates hydrogen-dense dark matter pathways for them to travel on. He instructs them to terraform a gas giant's moon and seed it with dinosaur life while he sends a meteorite towards the crucible to give mammals a chance to evolve into intelligent life forms.

In order to nudge the evolution of the dinosaurs towards intelligence, The Watcher restores five ancestral digits which are buried in the junk DNA of Nanotyrannus. These dinosaurs evolve into Quintaglios, while nuclear war wipes out the Jijaki species upon whom the Watcher has come to rely. He becomes a passive observer who can only hope the Quintaglios figure out their perilous situation before it's too late.

== Major themes ==
Just as Far-Seer explored the intersection of science and religion, Fossil Hunter does as well, with its protagonist, Toroca, functioning as the Quintaglios' version of Charles Darwin. His discovery of unique Pterosaur species at the South Pole parallels the exotic flora and fauna Darwin encountered on the Galapagos Islands, and Toroca likewise comes up with a theory of natural selection to explain their specialised features. However, Robert J. Sawyer alters the situation for the Quintaglios slightly by making it appear as if their fossil record supports creationism, due to the transplant of life from Earth millions of years earlier.

Compared to Far-Seer, however, the science vs. religion angle has been downplayed slightly, and rather than following a single, linear narrative as the previous book did, Fossil Hunter has several plot threads which tie into and complement one another. Robert J. Sawyer, a self-professed murder/mystery fiction fan, wrote a murder/mystery plot line into Fossil Hunter.

== Literary significance and criticism ==
Fossil Hunter was met with similar critical acclaim as Far-Seer, with the Science Fiction Chronicle calling it "every bit as good as its excellent precessor." Again, reviewers praised the characterisation, worldbuilding, and its approach on the issue of science vs religion.
