= The Neanderthal Parallax =

Book by Robert J. Sawyer

- Hominids; Humans; Hybrids
- Author: Robert J. Sawyer
- Country: Canada
- Language: English
- Genre: Science fiction
- Publisher: Tor
- Published: 2002–2003
- Media type: Print
- No. of books: 3

The Neanderthal Parallax is a trilogy of novels written by Robert J. Sawyer and published by Tor. It depicts the effects of the opening of a connection between two versions of Earth in different parallel universes: the world familiar to the reader, and another where Neanderthals became the dominant intelligent hominid. The societal, spiritual, and technological differences between the two worlds form the focus of the story.

The trilogy's volumes are Hominids (published 2002), Humans (2003), and Hybrids (2003). Hominids first appeared as a serial in Analog Science Fiction, won the 2003 Hugo Award for Best Novel, and was nominated for the John W. Campbell Award the same year; Humans was a 2004 Hugo Award finalist. In 2017, the full trilogy was presented the Aurora Award for Best of the Decade.

The initial contact between the two worlds takes place at the Sudbury Neutrino Observatory in Sudbury, Ontario, which is also the location of a scientific research facility in the Neanderthal world.

== Terminology ==
As the books unfold, the term human is used to refer to both species; both species agree to use the Neanderthal terms—gliksin for members of Homo sapiens and barast for members of Homo neanderthalensis—to distinguish between them.

== Plot ==
In Sudbury, Ontario, the Sudbury Neutrino Observatory is conducting a physics experiment. This is interrupted by the mysterious arrival of a strange man, who is believed by the people who meet him to be a Neanderthal. Geneticist Mary Vaughn, a professor at Toronto's York University, is called in to determine if the man really is a Neanderthal.

Mary is reeling from being recently raped by a masked man on the University campus, and finds this a welcome distraction along with the scientific opportunity of a lifetime. She works with her friend physicist Louise Benoit, who'd initially encountered the man. The two, plus physician Ruben Montego, learn that he is a Neanderthal from a parallel universe.

His name is Ponter Boddit, a quantum physicist who somehow passed into our universe as the result of an experiment gone wrong. Mary and Ruben are fascinated by the fact of his existence, and explore the many differences that distinguish his people from theirs. Meanwhile, Ponter's spouse and scientific partner, Adikor Huld, is distraught at his sudden disappearance, then doubly so after he's been accused of murdering Ponter due to his vanishing.

Long-term contact is eventually created between the two worlds, along with formal diplomatic relations. However, issues of distrust and misunderstanding plague the characters. Ponter and Mary forge a relationship as they strive for both their people's mutual benefit even as they struggle to work through profoundly different beliefs as a potential crisis looms for our Earth.

== Barast society ==
The Barasts (Neanderthals) are dedicated hunter-gatherers and have no developed concept of agriculture. Despite this, they are still technologically advanced, possessing quantum computers, helicopters, communications, and biological recording instruments. They live in harmony with their environment, using clean energy and keeping a constant population. They measure long periods of time in lunar months, not years. The total barast population is much lower, numbering only 185 million worldwide compared to the gliksins' (humans') 6 billion.

=== Family life ===
Due to their advanced sense of smell, barasts are very sensitive to pheromones. Accordingly, women and men live in separate communities for 25 out of every 29 days. The four days when they do come together — known as two becoming one — are the cause of a monthly celebration and holiday. All barast women have synchronized menstrual cycles, and the meeting-times are set so that conception is unlikely — except every 10 years, when another generation is purposely conceived. Generations thus grow in synchronized, ten-year cycles; barasts don't need to give his age, as simply stating his generation (if this is not simply inferred from his appearance) will give the needed information.

All children live with their mothers until they reach the age of ten; boys then go to live with their fathers. Children remain with their appropriate parent until the approximate age of 18. Despite this separation of sexes, the barast find the idea of considering either sex better than the other for any reason to be completely foreign (female barast do not suffer any large-scale physical incapacity due to pregnancy). The separation is a voluntary and cultural thing, and people of both sexes are free to go where the other lives at all times but find it physically and socially discomfiting to do so when two are not one. However, facilities and living styles are fully and truly 'separate but equal' in barast society, and in the rare event that it is too difficult or resource intensive to do so (for example, large scale scientific facilities), this separation is ignored without incident.

While opposite-sex couples form long-term bonds similar to marriage, the same is true of life during the rest of the month. All barasts would consider themselves bisexual by the gliksin definition; they form same-sex bonds while two are not one. Thus each adult who so chooses, no matter their gender, has a man-mate and a woman-mate; one for procreation and the genetic family basis, the other for companionship and a family unit base when their opposite-sex partner is not present. The larger, intertwined family networks that result add cohesion to barast society.

=== Government and justice ===
The barast world has a single government hierarchy: each region of the globe is governed by a local Gray Council; these in turn answer to the High Gray Council, the world government.

About eight decades before the time of the novels, companion implants were perfected and issued to all barasts. These are comprehensive recording and transmission devices, mounted in the forearm of each person. Their entire life is constantly monitored and sent to their alibi archive, a repository of recordings that are only accessible by their owner, or by the proper authorities when investigating an infraction, and in the latter case only in circumstances relevant to the investigation. Recordings are maintained after death; it is not made clear what the reasoning is for this and under what circumstances and or by whom a deceased person's archive can be accessed.

Any serious crime has a single punishment: the castration of the offender and all others who share at least half his genes (parents, siblings, and children). This eugenic practice serves to keep any undesirable elements out of the gene pool without severely punishing an offender, beyond his loss of genetic heritage. Ponter explains that it also has the desirable secondary effect of eliminating an offender's violent impulses due to their lacking testosterone, and so they don't commit further crimes (how female offenders are punished isn't discussed).

As a result (coupled with the alibi archives making it nearly impossible for a person to get away with a crime or the innocent convicted), serious crimes of almost any sort are virtually unknown in the barast world. The exception is crimes committed by a partner. Because the punishment for such crimes, such as spousal abuse, would include the castration of the complainant's own children, these crimes are unreported. While divorce for barast is generally a simple matter of deciding and declaring not to be with another person, those in such relationships find themselves trapped, as freeing their partner to seek a new mate opens the possibility that the new mate will report the violent activity.

Because barast physical strength is much higher than that of a gliksin, any physical violence between them is almost certain to result in death or serious injury. They thus lack any direct physical confrontation sports and martial arts (the second is lacking additionally because barasts do not have many conflicts; they have had only one war in their recent history, with the loss of 83 people being considered a horrendous tragedy). Past political assassinations did not even require weapons, given their physical strength, since a barast could simply murder their target using their bare hands.

Any physical violence, if reported, results in immediate imposition of castration. However, because the punishment is so severe, these incidents are not always reported officially, and if the injured party is willing to forgive, and the aggressor undertakes counseling for anger management, an incident may go unpunished. Such incident is admissible in a future legal hearing as evidence of a prior disposition to violence, however. Legally, if an accusation is not formally made, there can be no trial.

Humans told of this practice are usually disturbed, given Earth's history of eugenics. Though the main purpose is to purge genes that could lead to criminality, it was once mentioned they had also sterilized people with low IQ in the past too and raised theirs a standard deviation as a result.

=== Environment ===
Lower population levels and the absence of large-scale agriculture mean that many species exist which are extinct on the gliksin version of Earth. These include not only birds such as the passenger pigeon, but also megafauna such as the woolly mammoth. Also, forests and jungles are much more extensive because there was no need to cut them down on a large scale. Barasts have domesticated wolves as companions, but have not bred them into the many varieties of the domestic dog. A gliksin may become fearful upon seeing a barast dog, thinking it a wild wolf. A barast, seeing a gliksin's dog such as a dachshund, may wonder if the creature really is a dog.

It is heavily implied that the barasts did not spread to large areas of their world until after they had achieved a high level of civilization. One scene has a gliksin and a barast ancestor looking across the Mediterranean; the gliksin ancestor eagerly sets off to explore the new, strange place, while the barast ancestor notes its existence and goes home. This is consistent with their hunter-gatherer lifestyle which favors high levels of knowledge concerning the land and low migration, including a general avoidance of danger. Also, it is mentioned that barast are naturally of higher intelligence than gliksin, with average IQ being 10% higher before a several-generation eugenic campaign, during which the least intelligent 10% were voluntarily sterilized to increase the species intelligence (no data is given on the post-campaign IQ comparison). It is theorized that this difference is an additional reason for the lower occurrence of extinction events: because of their higher intelligence, the barast were able to recognize far earlier in their civilization that over-hunting would deplete a species.

The climate in the barast world is also somewhat cooler, because of the lack of greenhouse gases compared to the gliksins' Earth. Barasts are not as heat-tolerant as gliksins, probably because they evolved on a cooler Earth and also due to their greater muscle mass. As a result, tropical regions of their Earth are just as underpopulated as the polar regions on the gliksins' Earth. A significant story feature is the state of the Earth's magnetic field. In the barast world a reversal of polarity happened shortly before the story starts and caused no noticeable harm to the barasts. As to why the pole reversals are off by several years, it is ascribed to random small differences over the intervening 40,000 years. In the gliksin world, it is happening as the stories take place; this has an effect on the minds of gliksins, whose brain structures are different from the barasts.

=== Language ===
With the use of computer-aided communication devices, readers get to see only a glimpse of barast language. A dooslarm basadlarm refers to something like a judicial preliminary hearing with a literal translation of "asking small before asking large." The phrase Dusble korbul to kalbtadu is translated as "In a quantum-computing facility." Barast language is rendered as English when the action takes place in the barast world. One aspect of the language which can be discerned through the use of words like "gristle!" and "marrowless bone" for curses is that this register of speech is derived directly from real-world items. The customary barast greeting is "Healthy day." Barast swear words do not invoke religion or sex (given they lack the former and do not have taboos on the latter) but food decay, such as "gristle" or "green meat".

=== Economy ===
The barasts do not have a monetary economy. Each person is given what they need when they need it, and in turn is expected to work at providing a meaningful 'contribution' to society. No barast would ever dream of attempting to take more than they need from society, and because of their stable population, there are no issues with scarcity (the population level was stabilized at the point it was in order to prevent such issues from even developing).

Barasts always consider their work in terms of how it contributes to society, and any work which does not contribute sufficiently is stopped. This leads to a lack of knowledge in certain areas, such as astrophysics, as such pursuits are stopped once they ceased to produce meaningful improvements in ordinary life. This also leads to some over-specialization, as driving is considered a specialized contribution and how to do so is known only to public conveyors whose sole contribution is to taxi people from point to point or to drive public buses.

Occasionally, a Barast may voluntarily remove themselves from society in order to continue work that has been deemed not meaningful or to protest when work is purposefully stopped as dangerous. This individual would move away from the community to an isolated area, and would thereafter support themselves. They would not be able to generally ask for assistance from the greater community, and would also in some cases remove their Alibi Archive implant as protest (so their life after leaving the community would not be recorded) or have it removed involuntarily (to prevent any further recording regarding dangerous work). This isolation is voluntary, and they can have visitors or opt to return to the community at any time, although returning requires that they resume providing a meaningful contribution (and cease any dangerous work, if that was the reason for leaving).

=== Medicine ===
Barast medicine has become largely automated, and most doctors, aside from first aid (excepting researchers), simply operate and maintain this technology. This technology is highly robust and is able to be adapted to Gliksin physiology fairly quickly after contact.

A notable difference in medical practice is a result of the lack of squeamishness displayed by the Barast. Rather than using anesthesia for surgery, this technology uses direct neural blocks to cut off signals from any body part being operated on while the operation is performed in full view of the doctor and the patient being operated on. The Barast do not find this disturbing in the least, which one Gliksin theorizes is because, as they are still a civilization completely composed of active hunters, they have been exposed to such scenes since childhood.

Additionally, given their strong sense of smell, barast surgeons do not wear face masks while performing surgery so they can pick up any relevant olfactory factors to aid their work. One human undergoing surgery with them finds this unsettling as a possible hygiene risk.

=== Religion ===
The barasts have no religion and no concept of religion. This is not due to a simple disbelief or worldwide atheism. The barasts never had a religion and are not physically capable of believing in a god or gods or having religious experiences due to the structure of their brains. Prior to contact between the gliksins and the barasts, the barasts had no concept of a creator; an afterlife or souls never occurred to them. The barasts do not understand how the gliksins can possibly believe in the stories their religions tell and are sometimes frustrated with the gliksins' insistence of the truth of their beliefs. Nevertheless, the barasts do accept religion as a part of who the gliksins are. The barasts also do not believe that the universe had a beginning and disbelieve in the Big Bang. Instead, they believe the universe has always existed and can point to scientific evidence and verified theory to back up this belief. They believe that the gliksin theories concerning an origin of the universe exist because of the gliksin need to believe in a creator, and thus a beginning, which biases gliksin science so they misinterpreted the evidence. The story ends before any large-scale intermingling and rationalization of the two races' science can begin, so the ultimate outcome of detailed comparison between these viewpoints is unknown, though a magnetic pole reversal occurring on Earth causes a similar lack of religious/mystical belief to occur (following a surge) as human brains worldwide are affected (one result mentioned is peace in the Middle East as religious conflicts die out).
