= Watch (novel) =

2010 novel by Robert J. Sawyer

- Author: Robert J. Sawyer
- Language: English
- Series: WWW Trilogy
- Genre: Science fiction
- Publication place: Canada
- Preceded by: Wake
- Followed by: Wonder

Watch, also called WWW: Watch, is a 2010 novel written by Canadian novelist Robert J. Sawyer. It is the second installment in the WWW Trilogy and was preceded by Wake (2009) and followed by Wonder (2011).

== Synopsis ==
Caitlin has bonded with Webmind and the two find themselves sharing an unconventional, yet fulfilling friendship. However not everything is going quite as well as they hoped as they discover that the Web Activity Threat Containment Headquarters (WATCH), a secret division of the US National Security Agency, has been expressing concern over the potential threats posed by Webmind. WATCH is convinced that the entity will bring nothing but trouble and jeopardize the security of the United States and, as such, must be destroyed.

== Reception ==
Like its predecessor, critical reception for Watch was mostly positive. Much of the praise centered on Sawyer's use of technology and pacing, and SciFiNow wrote that the book was "a great science fiction novel, a melding of Frankenstein, high technology and our own perspectives as people, brought into the context of the modern world with the skill and panache of an exemplary practitioner of the form." Criticism for the book tended to stem from the usage of pop culture terms as well as Sawyer's use of the book as a platform for various viewpoints, which some reviewers felt detracted from their enjoyment.
