= Far-Seer =

1992 novel by Robert J. Sawyer

- First edition Pictured is the protagonist, Sal-Afsan.
- Author: Robert J. Sawyer
- Cover artist: Thomas Kidd
- Language: English
- Series: Quintaglio Ascension Trilogy
- Genre: Science fiction
- Publisher: Ace Books
- Publication date: June 1992
- Publication place: Canada
- Media type: Print (hardback & paperback)
- Pages: 313
- ISBN: 0-441-22551-9
- OCLC: 25854402
- Followed by: Fossil Hunter

Far-Seer is a novel written by Canadian science fiction author, Robert J. Sawyer. It is the first book of the Quintaglio Ascension Trilogy, and is followed by two sequels: Fossil Hunter and Foreigner. The book depicts an Earth-like world on a moon which orbits a gas giant, inhabited by a species of highly evolved, sentient Tyrannosaurs called Quintaglios, among various other creatures from the late Cretaceous period. Originally published in 1992 by Ace Science Fiction, it won the Homer award for "Best Novel" during its initial release date. It was reissued in 2004 by Tor Books and reissued again in 2022 by SFWRITER.COM Inc after the rights reverted back to the author.

== Plot summary ==
Afsan is an apprentice under Tak-Saleed, the Court Astrologer who has mysteriously sent away many apprentice astrologers in the past. He overhears a conversation in which Tak-Saleed rejects the offer of a "Far-Seer", a new invention brought to him by master mariner Var-Keenir. Afsan wishes to use the Far-Seer to look at The Face of God (a heavenly body worshiped by Quintaglios) but Saleed berates him for blasphemy upon hearing this. The Master of the Faith, Det-Yenalb, recommends that Afsan embark on his first hunt before the start of his coming-of-age pilgrimage to see The Face of God. Afsan arranges to go on both journeys with his friend Prince Dybo but not before Empress Len-Lends warns Afsan that he will pay a price if her son Dybo is not kept safe.

Afsan and Dybo join the pack of Imperial Hunt Leader Jal-Tetex. They are able to bring down a massive Thunderbeast which earns Afsan a reputation for being a natural. Afterwards, the young Quintaglios board the Dasheter, a sailing vessel commanded by Var-Keenir who recalls nearly losing his life to the sea monster Kal-Ta-Goot. Keenir lends Afsan the Far-Seer which Afsan uses to study the heavens and The Face of God. His observations fly in the face of orthodoxy by revealing that the Quintaglio homeworld is a moon orbiting The Face of God which itself is no more special than the other more distant planets.

Keenir initially shies away from testing Afsan's theory by sailing east in a great circle. However, he grants the request after the crew provokes a battle with Kal-Ta-Goot and Afsan saves the ship from the serpent. This displeases the priest Det-Bleen who refers to Keenir as a member of the Lubalite cult which rejects the dominant religion based on the prophet Larsk. The extended Quintaglio contact leads to the animalistic rage known as dagamant and Afsan killing the sailor Nor-Gampar to save Dybo. When the ship reaches land from the other side, Dybo learns of his mother's death and heads to the capital to become Emperor. Meanwhile, Afsan meets Wab-Novato, the inventor of the Far-Seer. Together, they realize that the Quitaglio homeworld is orbiting dangerously close to The Face of God and will soon break apart into a ring. This sharing of knowledge stimulates an impulsive act of sexual intercourse between the two.

After stopping in his hometown, Afsan is shocked to see a robed Quintaglio enter the nursery and eat all but one of the hatchlings. He learns that these Bloodpriests have been controlling the population in this manner since ancient times and suspects that Dybo's siblings were spared this fate and installed as governors across the land. Afsan hears that Tak-Saleed is ill and tells his master that the Quintaglios live on a moon whose days are numbered. Before dying, Saleed confesses that he knew this all along but wanted the news to be broken by a younger scientist. A public debate over Afsan's theory erupts and Det-Yenalb accuses Var-Keenir of poisoning Afsan's mind with Lubalite blasphemy. When Afsan does not repent, Yenalb tries to have him executed but Dybo imprisons him as a compromise. Palace butcher Pal-Cadool visits Afsan's cell and tells him to look for a hand sign that his allies will use.

Cadool and Tetex, who are both Lubalites, agree that Afsan is The One foretold in their religion. Afsan refuses an offer from Yenalb to live in exile and is once again spared execution by Dybo. Instead, Yenalb gouges out his eyes. After befriending Pal-Cadool and Jal-Tetex, Afsan convinces their followers to embrace the coming enlightenment. His speech is interrupted by Yenalb and the palace guards who attack the Lubalites. Cadool kills Yenalb before an earthquake puts an end to the battle and destroys Capital City. Among the contingent escaping on the Dasheter, Afsan finds Novato who has given birth to their eight children. Since Bloodpriests are loyal to The One, they are allowed to live. Dybo apologizes to Afsan for blinding him and acknowledges the truth of his theory. As the new Court Astrologer, Afsan proposes a Quintaglio Exodus, prompting Dybo to announce that their species will be going to the stars.

== Development ==
Though Far-Seer is Robert J. Sawyer's second novel, the Quintaglios themselves long predate its publication. Sawyer first created them when he was a teenager, inspired by the alien species of science fiction author Larry Niven. Far-Seer was rejected by several publishers because they didn't believe a story without human characters would appeal to a broad enough audience to turn a profit. The book was initially planned as a standalone novel, but Sawyer was convinced by his agent to make it into a series. This resulted in changes to the manuscript. In the original draft, Afsan was meant to die at the end from injuries he sustained during the final battle. A subplot telling the backstory of The Watcher, a God-like entity who transplanted the dinosaurs from earth to the Quintaglio homeworld, and an epilogue set in the far future portraying the Quintaglios voyaging to earth on a starship, were cut from Far-Seer and repurposed for the second and third novels in the trilogy. One draft of the book's ending, shared on Robert J. Sawyer's Patreon page, contained an epilogue where The Watcher, angered by humanity's history of waging holy wars among themselves, implied that it would take the Quintaglios' side and exterminate humanity if they rejected the Quintaglios upon their arrival to earth.

== Major themes ==
Far-Seer (and the rest of the Quintaglio Ascension) is highly allegorical. The character of Afsan parallels Galileo.

== Literary significance and criticism ==
Far-Seer met with high critical acclaim, winning the Homer award for "Best Novel" during its original 1992 release. The Toronto Star called it "One of the year's outstanding SF books". The story has been praised for its creativity, its endearing characters and its social relevance. Far-Seer has been translated into numerous languages, and is also the only book in the Quintaglio Ascension to have been translated into Japanese.

However, Far-Seer has received some criticism. Some reviewers have said that the Quintaglios act too human, while others point out the implausibility of a technological civilisation developing from a nomadic hunting society.
