= The Terminal Experiment =

1995 novel by Robert J. Sawyer

- First edition (paperback)
- Author: Robert J. Sawyer
- Original title: Hobson's Choice
- Cover artist: Joe Burleson
- Language: English
- Genre: Science fiction
- Publisher: HarperPrism (Canada/U.S.), New English Library (U.K.)
- Publication date: March 23, 1995
- Media type: Print (Paperback)
- Pages: 333
- Awards: Nebula Award for Best Novel (1995); Aurora Award for Best Novel (1995)
- ISBN: 0-06-105310-4 (Canada/U.S.); 0-340-63223-2 (U.K.)
- OCLC: 32448141

The Terminal Experiment is a science fiction novel by Canadian writer Robert J. Sawyer. The book won the 1995 Nebula Award for Best Novel, and was nominated for the Hugo Award for Best Novel in 1996. Sawyer received a writer's reserve grant from the Ontario Arts Council in 1993 in support of his writing the novel.

The story was first serialised in Analog magazine in the mid-December 1994 to March 1995 issues, under the name Hobson's Choice, before its first novel publication in May, 1995. A Hobson's choice is an apparently free choice that is really no choice at all. In this book it is a play on the main character's name and describes the choice between immortality and provable life after death.

== Characters ==
- Dr. Peter Hobson - founder of Hobson Monitoring, a biomedical company, and devoted husband to Cathy.
- Cathy Churchill Hobson - beautiful, intelligent wife of Peter, she has low self-esteem issues. Her confession to Peter that she had an affair with Hans taints their decades-long happy marriage.
- Hans Larsen - coworker to Cathy, he is a promiscuous adulterer and womanizer, and cocky and boastful about it. He is maimed and murdered for having seduced Cathy.
- Rod Churchill - uncaring father to Cathy, he is a retired gym teacher. He is also murdered.
- Detective Sandra Philo - a detective investigating the deaths of Larsen and Churchill, she knows that the Hobsons are somehow involved.
- Sarkar Muhammed - a friend and collaborator of Peter, he is a genius working in artificial intelligence

== Plot ==
The novel takes place in Toronto, briefly in 1995 and chiefly in 2011. Dr. Peter Hobson, a biomedical engineer, has invented many devices in the field of home automation. He has always been haunted by memories of monitoring an EKG during the dissection of a "corpse" for organ donation when he was in graduate school; the donor's heart was still beating and the body exhibited signs of anesthesia awareness. Now, Peter devises what he calls a superEEG in order to determine the exact moment when all electrical energy ceases in the brain; he wants to precisely "determine that someone is dead before they begin carving out his organs."

Peter is hurt and angry when his beloved wife, Cathy, admits that she had sex with Hans Larsen, whom neither of them respects. A psychotherapist helps her to understand that she has low self-esteem because of emotional neglect by her critical father Rod. Peter throws himself into his work. This is the emotional set-up that drives events in the following five months.

To his shock, when Peter places his superEEG on the head of a willing terminal patient, he afterwards finds in the readouts a small electrical field leaving the brain after death. He shares this discovery with his friend Sarkar Muhammed, who runs his own startup firm doing expert system design. Sarkar declares it a soul, which Peter, a skeptic, is reluctant to believe. To maintain precise scientific language, they call it a soulwave: "The soulwave had a distinctive electrical signature. The frequency was very high, well above that of normal electrochemical brain activity, so, even though the voltage was minuscule, it wasn't washed out in the mass of other signals within the brain."

Peter experiments with more terminal patients to verify his finding; he tests pregnant women to discover when the fetus gains a soulwave (at about ten weeks); and he finds that, among animals, at least chimpanzees also have souls.

When Peter holds a press conference to announce his breakthrough, human society around the world undergoes a revolution. He is repeatedly asked what life after death is like, though he has no idea.

In order to learn about immortality and life after death, Peter and Sarkar create three electronic simulations of Peter's own personality after a comprehensive scan of his mind and memories. From one, they seek "which neural nets are activated exclusively by biological concerns, and then zero those out" (p. 131), so that it is purely intellect; they call it Spirit. From the second, they edit all fears of aging and death, so that it "feels" itself to be immortal; they call this one Ambrotos. The third is a control, with Peter's knowledge up to the point of the brain scan. At first, the three "sims" enjoy exploring all that the Internet has to offer. One sim, however, hires a hit man to kill Hans and then, days later, Cathy's father.

Detective Sandra Philo takes the case and, questioning Cathy and her co-workers, realizes at once that Cathy is concealing her relationship with Hans. She also knows Peter is rich enough to afford hiring a professional hit. What she doesn't realize is that the guilty sim is prepared to have her killed, too. Peter and Sarkar race to find a way to "pull the plug" on the sims before Philo and perhaps others die.

== Critical reception ==
Besides winning the Nebula Award, The Terminal Experiment won the Prix Aurora Award for Best Long Form in English of 1995. It also earned one of the nine HOMer Awards that Sawyer has won. The novel was a Preliminary Nominee for the Bram Stoker Award, for Superior Achievement in a Novel, and was nominated for the Science Fiction Chronicle Award.

Brian Stableford wrote in an overview: "Sawyer's work became conspicuously more ambitious in the late 1990s. The Terminal Experiment (1995) has a murder mystery subplot, but foregrounds an enquiry into the roots of ethical philosophy, employing three artificial 'clones' of its protagonist's personality as subjects in an elaborate thought experiment."

Steven H Silver wrote, "Sawyer is writing a mystery with this book, and, to a certain extent, succeeds. The pace is good, keeping you turning the pages, and the characters are likeable, even the libidinous Hans and the un-enlightened Rod. However, because of the way Sawyer creates his mystery, there is no real chance of figuring out who is responsible."
