= WWW Trilogy =

Novel series by Robert J. Sawyer

- Wake, Watch, Wonder
- Author: Robert J. Sawyer
- Country: Canada
- Language: English
- Genre: Science fiction, young adult
- Publisher: Ace
- Published: 2009 - 2011
- Media type: Print (hardcover, paperback), audiobook, e-book

The WWW Trilogy is a trilogy of science-fiction novels by Canadian science fiction author Robert J. Sawyer. The first book, Wake, was originally serialized in four parts in Analog Science Fiction and Fact from November 2008 to March 2009, published in book form through Ace on April 7, 2009, and was followed by the second book, Watch, on April 6, 2010. Wonder was published in 2011.

== Synopsis ==
The trilogy follows Caitlin Decter, a brilliant young blind teenager whose disability is more of a benefit when surfing the Internet. A Japanese researcher offers Caitlin the ability to gain her sight via a revolutionary new implant, an offer she eagerly accepts. However, she's surprised when rather than showing her the ordinary world, Caitlin is now able to see the Internet and all it has to offer her. She comes across Webmind, a self-aware consciousness that is growing and evolving through the Internet. The two become friends but WATCH, a secret division of the US National Security Agency, is all too aware of Webmind's existence and is concerned over its potential threat to national security. However, even as Webmind shows how it can benefit mankind, the government believes that it is an entity that should be destroyed at all costs.

== Books ==
1. Wake (2009)
2. Watch (2010)
3. Wonder (2011)

== Development ==
Sawyer was inspired to write the WWW Trilogy after reading an issue of New Scientist that remarked that in the early 21st century the World Wide Web "could have the same number of synapses as the human brain", which made him draw comparisons to human evolution. While writing, Sawyer had difficulty writing the character of Caitlin due to the two of them being so different, but stated that he felt that the challenge was "fun". As such, he conducted research on what it was like to be blind and received input from his nieces, which he used to help build the character of Caitlin. While writing the trilogy Sawyer also consulted a young adult librarian, as he wanted to "appeal to both the adult and YA markets with the WWW trilogy". He also tried to incorporate various different ethnicities in the work, as he noted that several science fiction works such as Star Wars and 2001 did not contain many or any non-Caucasian characters.

== Reception ==
Critical reception for the WWW Trilogy has been predominantly positive and the series has received praise from outlets such as Publishers Weekly, SF Site, and SF Signal. Much of the praise centered on its characters and technology, and in their review of Wake, the SF Site commented that "Even with such a focus on technology and culture, Sawyer never loses sight of his individual characters." Criticisms of the work tended to stem around Sawyer's usage of the trilogy to champion several different causes, which some reviewers felt detracted from their enjoyment of the work and did not help fully flesh out the characters.

=== Awards ===
- Aurora Award for Wake (2009, won)
- Hugo Award for Wake (2009, nominated)
