= Robert J. Sawyer =

Canadian science fiction writer (born 1960)

Robert J. Sawyer CM OOnt
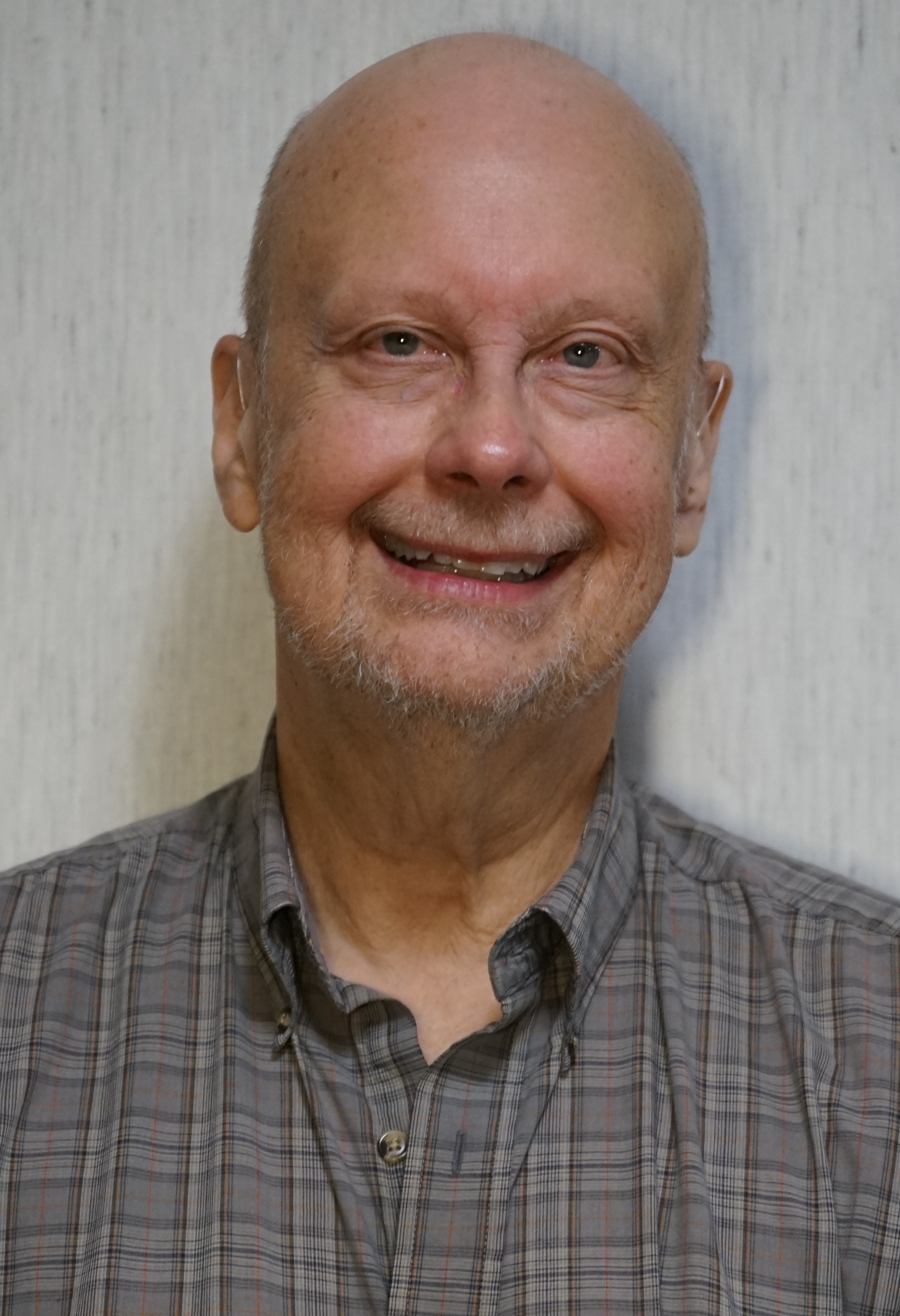
- Sawyer at Worldcon 2026
- Born: April 29, 1960 (age 66); Ottawa, Ontario, Canada
- Citizenship: Canada; United States
- Education: Ryerson University
- Occupation: Novelist
- Writing career
- Genres: Science fiction; mystery
- Website: sfwriter.com

Robert James Sawyer CM OOnt (born April 29, 1960) is a Canadian and American writer of science fiction. He is the author of 25 published novels, and his short fiction has appeared in magazines and journals such as Analog Science Fiction and Fact, Amazing Stories, On Spec, and Nature, in addition to several anthologies. He has won many writing awards, including the Nebula Award for Best Novel (1995), the Hugo Award for Best Novel (2003), the John W. Campbell Memorial Award (2006), the Robert A. Heinlein Award (2017), and multiple Aurora Awards (more than any other writer).

Sawyer was born in Ottawa. He has lived in the Greater Toronto Area for most of his life and has been a resident of Mississauga since 2000.

== Fiction ==
=== Style and themes ===
Sawyer's work frequently explores the intersection between science and religion, with rationalism winning out over mysticism. The most relevant novels in this regard are Far-Seer, The Terminal Experiment, Calculating God, and the three volumes of the Neanderthal Parallax (Hominids, Humans, and Hybrids), in addition to the short story "The Abdication of Pope Mary III" (originally published in Nature, July 6, 2000).

Sawyer often explores the notion of copied or uploaded human consciousness (or mind uploading)—most fully in his novel Mindscan, but also in Flashforward, Golden Fleece, The Terminal Experiment, "Identity Theft", "Biding Time", "Shed Skin", and The Downloaded.

His interest in consciousness studies is also apparent in Wake, which deals with the spontaneous emergence of consciousness in the infrastructure of the World Wide Web. His interest in quantum physics, and especially quantum computing, informs the short stories "You See But You Do Not Observe" (a pastiche of Sherlock Holmes ) and "Iterations," in addition to the novels Factoring Humanity and Hominids.

SETI, the Search for Extraterrestrial Intelligence, plays a role in the plots of Golden Fleece, Factoring Humanity, Mindscan, Rollback, the novelette "Ineluctable," and the short stories "You See But You Do Not Observe" and "Flashes." Sawyer gives cosmology a thorough discussion in his far-future Starplex. Real-life science institutions are often used as settings by Sawyer, including TRIUMF in End of an Era, CERN in Flashforward, the Royal Ontario Museum in Calculating God, the Sudbury Neutrino Observatory in Hominids and its sequels, the Arecibo Observatory in Rollback, the Canadian Light Source in Quantum Night, and the Los Alamos National Laboratory and the Institute for Advanced Study in The Oppenheimer Alternative.

Sawyer's prose has been described by Orson Scott Card as similar to that of Isaac Asimov in its clarity.

==== SF/mystery crossovers ====
Sawyer has won both Canada's top SF award (the Prix Aurora Award) and its top mystery-fiction award (the Arthur Ellis Award) for his 1993 short story "Just Like Old Times". Illegal Alien is a courtroom drama with an extraterrestrial defendant; Hominids puts one Neanderthal on trial by his peers for the apparent murder of another Neanderthal; Mindscan has the rights of uploaded consciousnesses explored in a Michigan probate court; and Golden Fleece, Fossil Hunter, The Terminal Experiment, Frameshift, Flashforward, and Red Planet Blues are all, in part, murder mysteries. Of Sawyer's shorter SF works, the novella Identity Theft and the short stories "Biding Time", "Flashes", "Iterations", "Shed Skin", "The Stanley Cup Caper", "You See But You Do Not Observe", "The Hand You're Dealt", and the aforementioned "Just Like Old Times" are all also crime or mystery fiction.

== Editing and scholarly work ==
In addition to his own writing, Sawyer used to edit the Robert J. Sawyer Books science-fiction imprint for Red Deer Press, part of Canadian publisher Fitzhenry & Whiteside; contributes to The New York Review of Science Fiction; is The Canadian Encyclopedia's authority on science fiction; and is a judge for L. Ron Hubbard's Writers of the Future contest.

Sawyer continues to use WordStar 7.0 for DOS (the final release, last updated in 1992) to write his novels. All twenty-five of his novels were written with WordStar. He runs WordStar on modern systems using the DOSBox-X emulator. Sawyer shared the "Complete WordStar 7.0 Archive" on his website.

== Film and television ==
In May 2009, ABC ordered 13 episodes of FlashForward (an hour-long dramatic TV series) for the 2009–2010 season. It is based on Sawyer's similarly titled novel, after successful production in February and March 2009 of a pilot episode scripted by David S. Goyer and Brannon Braga, directed by Goyer, and starring Joseph Fiennes and Sonya Walger. After some adjustments, the first season was set to consist of 22 episodes. Sawyer was a consultant on each episode of the series and wrote the 19th episode, entitled "Course Correction".

Sawyer wrote the original series bible for Charlie Jade, an hour-long science-fiction TV series that first aired in 2005–2006, and he did conceptual work in 2003 for reviving Robotech. He has also written and narrated documentaries about science fiction for CBC Radio's Ideas series, and he hosted the 17-part weekly half-hour documentary series Supernatural Investigator for Canada's Vision TV, which premiered January 27, 2009. He provided analysis of the British science fiction series Doctor Who for the CBC's online documentary The Planet of the Doctor, frequently comments on science fiction movies for TVOntario's Saturday Night at the Movies, and co-edited an essay collection in honor of the fortieth anniversary of Star Trek with David Gerrold, titled Boarding the Enterprise.

== Teaching and public speaking ==
Sawyer has taught science-fiction writing at the University of Toronto, Ryerson University, Humber College, and the Banff Centre. In 2000, he served as Writer-in-Residence at the Richmond Hill, Ontario public library. In 2003, he was Writer-in-Residence at the Toronto Public Library's Merril Collection of Science Fiction, Speculation and Fantasy (the first person to hold this post since Judith Merril herself in 1987). In 2006, he was Writer-in-Residence at the Odyssey Writing Workshop. Also in 2006, he was the Edna Staebler Writer-in-Residence at the Kitchener public library in the Region of Waterloo, Ontario, following the Region of Waterloo's choice of Sawyer's Hominids as the "One Book, One Community" title that all 490,000 residents were encouraged to read in 2005. In 2007 he was the Berton House Writer-in-Residence at Berton House in Dawson City. In 2009, he was the first-ever Writer-in-Residence at the Canadian Light Source, Canada's national synchrotron facility in Saskatoon, Saskatchewan.

Sawyer is a frequent keynote speaker about technology topics, and has served as a consultant to Canada's Federal Department of Justice on the shape that future genetics laws should take.

== Influence and recognition ==
Robert J. Sawyer on Bookbits radio.

=== Canadian ===
Sawyer has long been an advocate of Canadian science fiction. He lobbied hard for the creation of the Canadian Region of the Science Fiction and Fantasy Writers of America . The Canadian Region was established in 1992, and Sawyer served for three years on SFWA's Board of Directors as the first Canadian Regional Director (1992–1995). He also edited the newsletter of the Canadian Region, called Alouette in honor of Canada's first satellite; the newsletter was nominated for a Prix Aurora Award for best fanzine.

Sawyer was awarded an Honorary Doctor of Letters from Laurentian University in 2007 and an Honorary Doctor of Laws from the University of Winnipeg in 2014.

=== International translations ===
In addition to his popularity at home, Sawyer's work is well received internationally. All of his novels have been issued by New York publishing houses and translated editions have appeared in Bulgarian, Chinese, Czech, Dutch, French, Hungarian, German, Italian, Japanese, Korean, Polish, Romanian, Russian, Serbian, and Spanish.

=== Professional associations ===
In 1998, Sawyer was elected president of SFWA on a platform that promised a referendum on various contentious issues, including periodic membership requalification and the creation of a Nebula Award for best script; he won, defeating the next-closest candidate, past SFWA president Norman Spinrad, by a 3:2 margin. However, Sawyer's actual time in office was marked by considerable opposition to membership requalification and negative reaction to his dismissing — supported by a majority of the Board of Directors — one paid SFWA worker and one volunteer. He resigned after completing half of his one-year term, and was automatically succeeded by then-incumbent vice-president Paul Levinson. Prior to resigning, Sawyer's promised referendum was held, resulting in significant changes to SFWA's bylaws and procedures, most notably allowing appropriate non-North American sales to count as membership credentials, allowing appropriate electronic sales to count as membership credentials, and creating a Nebula Award for best script.

Sawyer has been active in other writers' organizations, including the Crime Writers of Canada, the Horror Writers Association, and the Writers' Union of Canada (for which he has served on the membership committee), and he is a member of scriptwriting unions Writers Guild of America and Writers Guild of Canada.

=== Ribbon bars ===

Ribbon	Description	Date	Notes
	Order of Canada	2016	Member (CM)
	Order of Ontario	2018	Member (OOnt)
	Queen Elizabeth II Diamond Jubilee Medal	2012	Canadian version

=== Major awards ===
- 1991 Prix Aurora Award for Best Long Work in English, for Golden Fleece
- 1992 Homer Award for Best Novel, for Far-Seer
- 1993 Arthur Ellis Award for Best Short Story, for "Just Like Old Times"
- 1993 Homer Award for Best Novel, for Fossil Hunter
- 1995 Le Grand Prix de l'Imaginaire for Best Foreign Short Story, "You See But You Do Not Observe"
- 1995 Nebula Award for Best Novel, for The Terminal Experiment
- 1995 Prix Aurora Award for Best Long Work in English, for The Terminal Experiment
- 1996 Seiun Award for Best Foreign Novel, for End of an Era
- 1996 Prix Aurora Award for Best Long Work in English, for Starplex
- 1997 Science Fiction Chronicle Reader Award for Best Short Story, for "The Hand You're Dealt"
- 1999 Prix Aurora Award for Best Long Work in English, for Flashforward
- 2000 Seiun Award for Best Foreign Novel, for Frameshift
- 2001 Hugo Award nominee in the Best Novel category for Calculating God
- 2002 Seiun Award for Best Foreign Novel, for Illegal Alien
- 2003 Hugo Award for Best Novel, for Hominids
- 2005 Analog Analytical Laboratory Award for Best Short Story, for "Shed Skin"
- 2005 Prix Aurora Award for Best Work in English (Other) for Relativity
- 2006 John W. Campbell Memorial Award for Best Science Fiction Novel, for Mindscan
- 2007 Toronto Public Library Celebrates Reading Award
- 2007 Galaxy Award (China) for "Most Popular Foreign Author"
- 2007 Prix Aurora Award for Best Short Work in English, for "Biding Time"
- 2010 Prix Aurora Award for Best Long Form in English, for Wake
- 2010 Hugo Award nominee in the Best Novel category for Wake
- 2011 Prix Aurora Award for Best Science Fiction Novel in Canada, for Watch
- 2012 Prix Aurora Award for Best Science Fiction Novel in Canada, for Wonder
- 2013 Lifetime Achievement Prix Aurora Award
- 2014 Edward E. Smith Memorial Award ("the Skylark)
- 2016 Member of the Order of Canada "for his accomplishments as a science fiction writer and mentor, and for his contributions as a futurist"
- 2017 Robert A. Heinlein Award
- 2017 Member of the Order of Ontario for being "one of the world's top science-fiction authors and a champion of the Canadian fiction industry".
- Aurora Award for Best Novel for Download 2.

== Bibliography ==
=== Novels ===
- Golden Fleece (Warner Books/Questar, 1990)
- End of an Era (Ace, 1994)
- The Terminal Experiment (serialized as Hobson's Choice in Analog; HarperPrism, 1995)
- Starplex (serialized in Analog; Ace, 1996)
- Frameshift (Tor, 1997)
- Illegal Alien (Ace, 1997)
- Factoring Humanity (Tor, 1998)
- Flashforward (Tor, 1999)
- Calculating God (Tor, 2000)
- Mindscan (Tor, 2005)
- Rollback (serialized in Analog; Tor, 2007)
- Triggers (serialized in Analog, 2012; Ace USA, Viking Canada, and Gollancz UK, April 2012)
- Red Planet Blues (Ace USA and Viking Canada, 2013; Orion/Gollancz UK, 2014)
- Quantum Night (Ace USA and Viking Canada, 2016)
- The Oppenheimer Alternative (CAEZIK SF & Fantasy (US) and Red Deer Press (Canada), 2020; reissued by Shadowpaw Press, 2026)
- The Downloaded (Audible 2023 [audiobook] and Shadowpaw Press [print], 2024)
- The Downloaded 2: Ghosts in the Machine (Audible 2025 [audiobook] and Shadowpaw Press [print], 2026)

The Quintaglio Ascension trilogy

- Far-Seer (Ace, 1992)
- Fossil Hunter (Ace, 1993)
- Foreigner (Ace, 1994)

The Neanderthal Parallax trilogy

- Hominids (serialized in Analog; Tor, 2003)
- Humans (Tor, 2003)
- Hybrids (Tor, 2003)

The WWW trilogy

- Wake (serialized in Analog, 2008–2009; Ace USA, Viking Canada, and Orion/Gollancz UK, 2009)
- Watch (Ace USA, Viking Canada, and Orion/Gollancz UK, 2010)
- Wonder (Ace USA, Penguin Canada and Orion/Gollancz UK, 2011)

=== Short story collections ===
- Iterations – Short stories (Quarry Press, 2002)
- Relativity (ISFiC Press, 2004)
- Identity Theft and Other Stories (Red Deer Press, 2008)

=== Anthologies ===
- Tesseracts 6 with Carolyn Clink (1997)
- Crossing the Line: Canadian Mysteries With a Fantastic Twist with David Skene-Melvin (1999)
- Distant Early Warnings: Canada's Best Science Fiction (2009)

=== Nonfiction ===
- Boarding the Enterprise: Transporters, Tribbles, And the Vulcan Death Grip in Gene Rodenberry's Star Trek edited with David Gerrold (BenBella Books, 2006)
- Sawyer on Science Fiction (Shadowpaw Press, 2026)
