= Wonder (Sawyer novel) =

2011 novel by Robert J. Sawyer

- Author: Robert J. Sawyer
- Language: English
- Series: WWW Trilogy
- Genre: Science fiction
- Publisher: Ace Books
- Publication place: Canada
- Preceded by: Watch

Wonder, also called WWW: Wonder, is a 2011 novel written by Canadian novelist Robert J. Sawyer. It is the third and last installment in the WWW Trilogy and was preceded by two sequels, Wake (2009) and Watch (2010).

== Synopsis ==
Following the government's unsuccessful attempts to eliminate Webmind, Caitlin and her family find themselves receiving widespread media attention. While many people are optimistic about Webmind's potential contributions, including advancements in cancer treatment and international relations, others express concerns about the possible risks it may present. Meanwhile, the Pentagon remains determined to eliminate Webmind and has enlisted highly skilled hackers to carry out the operation.

== Reception ==
Critical reception for Wonder was positive, and much of the novel's praise centered upon its "thoughtful "what if" scenarios". In contrast, the National Post expressed disappointment in the final book of the trilogy as they felt that the main flaws were "Sawyer's Pollyanna faith in the benefits of technology" and the insertion of several viewpoints in the book that they stated had an "eerie resemblance to the rankest propaganda".
